= 2010 Asian Games closing ceremony =

The closing ceremony for the 2010 Asian Games began on November 27, 2010, at 20:06 local time in front of 35,000 spectators. The show had the theme "Leave Your Song Here", and had cultural displays from China, India, Indonesia, Lebanon, Japan, Kazakhstan and Mongolia. The ceremony featured songs from different cultures as follows: the Indian "Saajan ji Ghar Aaye" and "Aao re Jhumo re", Indonesian "Sing Sing So" and Japanese "Sakura". Various artists from Taiwan, Hong Kong and mainland China performed "Triumphant Return", among them were Alan Tam, Leo Ku and Hacken Lee.

After awarding host badminton player Lin Dan with the most valuable player award, the President of the Olympic Council of Asia Ahmed Al-Fahad Al-Ahmed Al-Sabah officially announced the Games closed. As per tradition, People's Liberation Army personnel lowered the OCA flag, and carried it out of the ceremony venue. Later, the South Korean flag was raised to the South Korean national anthem. The mayor of Incheon, Song Young-gil, received the Games flag as the city was scheduled to host the 2014 Asian Games. The ceremony then proceeded with an eight-minute segment from Incheon called "Arirang Party" led by traditional percussionist Choi So-ri in Korean traditional costume along with taekwondo exponents. Famous Korean singer, songwriter, dancer, record producer and actor Rain also performed. Rain sang a medley of three of his hit songs, "Rainism", "Hip Song" and "Friends".

The closing ceremony ended with the flame being extinguished and the theme songs "Everyone" and "Cheer for Asia" being performed.
