= My Life (EP) =

EP by Rain
- Released: December 1, 2017
- Recorded: 2016–17
- Genre: K-pop; dance-pop; R&B; hip hop
- Length: 23:00
- Language: Korean
- Label: Rain Company; Genie Music
- Producer: Jung Ji-hoon; Kim Tae-wan; Jo Hyun-ah; Gill

Rain chronology
Rain Effect (2014)	My Life (2017)	Pieces by Rain (2021)

Singles from My Life
- 1. "Goodbye" Released: November 27, 2017; 2. "Gang" Released: December 1, 2017

My Life (stylized as MY LIFE愛) is the second Korean extended play (EP) by South Korean singer Rain. It was released on December 1, 2017, by Rain Company and distributed by Genie Music. Rain enlisted several musicians to help produce the record, including Brand New Music producer Kim Tae-wan, fellow The Unit mentor Jo Hyun-ah and rapper Gill. It contains a total of ten tracks, including the single "Gang" and pre-release track "Goodbye" with Jo Hyun-ah. Commercially, the EP peaked at number 7 on the Gaon Album Chart and sold over 8,900 copies.

== Background ==
On September 7, 2015, Rain announced that he and the CEO of Cube Entertainment came to a mutual decision to not renew his contract. After parting ways with Cube, Rain announced that he would create a one-man agency with the aid of his longtime manager and other entertainment figures. After the formation of his company, he embarked on a world tour entitled The Squall, which trekked across Asia.

On November 7, 2017, it was announced that Rain would release a new extended play My Life on December 1. Following the announcement of the EP, links on various digital music portals and retailers began opening for pre-orders. My Life was released both physically and digitally on December 1. The EP was primarily written and produced by Rain himself; he additionally enlisted Brand New Music producer Kim Tae-wan (who had collaborated with Rain on Rainism), Urban Zakapa's Jo Hyun-ah and former Leessang member Gill to produce the record.

== Singles ==
Rain revealed a teaser image for the pre-release single "Goodbye" through his Instagram on November 17. Through a video teaser on his official website, an unknown featured artist was revealed to be fellow The Unit mentor and Urban Zakapa vocalist Jo Hyun-ah. The video features both Rain and Hyun-ah in the studio writing and producing the song while performing in the studio booth. They made a special performance of the song for Dingo Music.

Rain Company revealed a teaser image for the primary single "Gang" on November 27, which was followed by additional concept images and a video teaser. Where "Goodbye" was more of a traditional ballad, "Gang" was described as "a powerful dance track that will give Rain another opportunity to showcase his stellar dancing skills and stage presence". Following the release of its full teaser, the music video was uploaded to YouTube in conjunction with the release of the EP. In the video, Rain is showcased switching between intense and smooth choreography as he and his dancers perform in an abandon warehouse, a fairground, a bowling alley, and a sun-drenched abandoned shipyard. With the album's release, Rain released a series of special clips.

== Promotion ==
On November 24, 2017, Rain kicked off promotion for the album by doing a V-Live chat and a special interview on The Cultwo Show on SBS Power FM. Following the comeback announcement, Rain Company revealed that the entertainer would have his own KBS comeback special titled 2017 Rain IS BACK, which aired on December 3. It was filmed on November 21 at the KBS Hall in Yeoido, Seoul in front of Rain's fans. The comeback special featured a special collaboration stage between The Unit contestants and Rain himself.

Rain began promoting his comeback album on various music programs, starting on the December 1, 2017, broadcast of KBS 2's Music Bank. On release day, Rain held a press conference talking about his fifteenth anniversary, the album production, family life and his role on The Unit. Following his comeback, Rain made a series of variety show promotional activities. He filmed with the cast and crew of JTBC's Carefree Travelers in Taiwan on October 29 to be aired on November 28 and December 2. He was featured in an episode of MBC's I Live Alone with actor and friend Lee Si-eon. He filmed his first appearance on MBC's Weekly Idol on November 24 before airing on December 6.

== Track listing ==
My Life track listing
No.	Title	Lyrics	Music	Length
1.	"Goodbye" (오늘 헤어져; featuring Jo Hyun-ah of Urban Zakapa)	Jung Ji-hoon, Jo Hyun-ah	Jo Hyun-ah	3:37
2.	"Baby Baby" (입에 달아)	Kim Tae-wan	Kim Tae-wan, Takey	3:20
3.	"Again" (다시)	Jung Ji-hoon, Kim Tae-wan	Jung Ji-hoon, Kim Tae-wan	3:45
4.	"Sunshine"	Jung Ji-hoon	Jung Ji-hoon, Kim Tae-wan	3:21
5.	"Gang" (깡)	Gill, LTAK	Gill	3:08
6.	"Again" (Instrumental)		Jung Ji-hoon, Kim Tae-wan	3:45
7.	"Gang" (Instrumental)		Gill	3:08
8.	"Sunshine" (Instrumental)		Jung Ji-hoon, Kim Tae-wan	3:21
Total length:				23:00

== Credits and personnel ==
- Jung Ji-hoon – vocals, songwriter, arrangement, music producer, composer
- Kim Tae-wan – songwriter, arrangement, music producer, composer
- Takey – composer
- Jo Hyun-ah – featured artist, songwriter, arrangement, composer
- Gill – songwriter, composer
- LTAK – songwriter

== Charts ==
Chart performance for My Life
Chart (2017)	Peak position
South Korean Albums (Gaon)	7

== Release history ==
Release history and formats for My Life
Region	Date	Format	Label
Various	December 1, 2017	CD, digital download, streaming	Rain Company, Genie Music
