= I'm Coming (Rain song) =

Single by Rain

from the album Rain's World
- Released: September 21, 2006
- Recorded: 2004–2006
- Studio: JYPE Studio
- Genre: K-pop
- Length: 3:43
- Label: JYP
- Songwriters: Park Jin-young; Tablo
- Producer: Park Jin-young

Rain singles chronology
"Still Believe" (2006)	"I'm Coming" (2006)	"In My Bed" (2006)

Music video
- "I'm Coming" on YouTube

"I'm Coming" (Korean: 아임 커밍) is a song by South Korean singer Rain featuring Tablo, taken from his fourth Korean-language studio album Rain's World. It was released on September 21, 2006, and was written and produced by Park Jin-young with additional writing credits by Tablo.

== Background and composition ==
"I'm Coming" went through numerous revisions over the span of two-years before its release. The song begins: "Ajigdo naleul umjig-ineun him-eun" (아직도 나를 움직이는 힘은, The force that still moves me) then continues till the refrain beginning "Rain is coming down" in English. The title phrase "I'm coming" does not actually appear in the lyrics.

== Music video ==
The music video for the single was released on September 21, 2006. It begins with Rain in a room with a light representing the sun rising. Then he is shown coming down a helicopter with wings and looking around. The atmosphere suggests a war has just happened so he has a very pained face. The scene changes and he is walking to a clearing in the wreckage without wings and soldiers are coming out of the rubble. The rest is a dance interlude.

== Promotion and live performances ==
Rain promoted "I'm Coming" on several South Korean music programs including Show! Music Core and Music Bank throughout October and November 2006. It was added to the set list of his Rain's Coming World Tour, which began at the Olympic Gymnastics Arena in Seoul, South Korea in December. Following the conclusion of the song's promotions, Rain donated his stage costumes to a charity auction event to help the elderly in need. Within a day of the auction's start, the bidding price of the military-style jacket Rain worn during the song's promotions was reported to have surpassed ₩452,000 (around $450).

== Accolades ==
Awards and nominations for "It's Coming"
Year	Organization	Award	Result	Ref.
2006	JukeOn Digital Music Awards	Best Featuring	Nominated	
2006	Mnet KM Music Festival	Best Male Artist	Won	
2006	Mnet KM Music Festival	Best Music Video	Nominated	
2006	Mnet KM Music Festival	Best Music Video Director	Nominated	

== Credits and personnel ==
Recording

- Recorded at JYPE Studio, Gangnam-gu, Seoul

Personnel

- Rain – vocals
- Park Jin-young – lyricist, composer, arranger
- Tablo – lyricist
- JYP Entertainment – executive producer
