= Rain Effect =

Studio album by Rain
- Released: January 2, 2014
- Recorded: 2013
- Genre: K-pop; dance-pop; R&B; electronica; hip hop
- Length: 31:13
- Language: Korean
- Label: Cube DC; Loen
- Producer: Jung Ji-hoon; JR Groove

Rain chronology
| Back to the Basic (2010) | Rain Effect (2014) | My Life (2017) |

Singles from Rain Effect
- 1. "30 Sexy" Released: January 1, 2014; 2. "La Song" Released: January 1, 2014; 3. "I Love You" Released: February 7, 2014

Rain Effect is the sixth Korean-language studio album (seventh overall) by South Korean recording artist Rain. It was released through Cube DC on January 2, 2014, and was distributed by Loen Entertainment. It is his first studio album in 6 years since Rainism (2008) and his first musical release since Back to the Basic (2010). Rain Effect contains a total of ten tracks, including the lead singles "30 Sexy" and "La Song".

The album was primarily written and produced by Rain along with Bae Jin-ryeol (JR Groove), Jung Woo-young and Hwang Hye-kyung. Hyuna participated as the album's only featured artist.

== Background ==
Details of Rain's comeback had been speculated about even before he was discharged from the military. Many articles predicted that Rain was signing with both Cube Entertainment (in Asia) and Roc Nation (Internationally). On September 17, it was officially announced that Rain had signed an exclusive deal with Cube DC. With that announcement, Cube Entertainment confirmed a Zepp Tour in Japan and appearances at a MCM store opening in Singapore, Bazaar Men People of the Year ceremony in China and a fan meeting in South Korea. Rain delivered a special performance at the 2013 MAMA, where a trailer teasing an upcoming reality show and new album was revealed.

According to an official from Cube Entertainment, Rain Effect is mostly written and produced by Rain himself. Similarly to his previous albums, he will have many collaboration tracks with respected composers including Bae Jin-ryeol. As the album progressed, Rain had been very involved in the album's planning (clothes, choreography, music, etc.). In the statement, Cube stated that "He [Rain] is known to show enthusiasm for the job by presiding over meetings to provide his fans with the best-quality album possible."

== Background and release ==
After Rain's performance at the 2013 Mnet Asian Music Awards, a trailer aired with the date "2014.01.06" and the phrase "Rain will fall, again." In December, links on various digital music portals as well as South Korean and international music retails began open for album pre-orders. On December 30, Rain released teaser on his official Twitter for both "30 Sexy" and "La Song". The album was originally to be released on January 6, but due to his film schedule for The Prince, the date was pushed up to January 2.

Rain Effect was released physically and digitally on January 2, 2014. The album peaked at number 1 on the Gaon Album Chart. On February 3, Cube DC announced that a special edition of the album would be release, digitally on February 7 and physically on February 11, with a new song titled "I Love You", a 64-page booklet and a 36-page notebook with Rain's personal stories. On June 6, 2014, to celebrate the birthday of her labelmate Hyuna, he released "Where You Going Oppa?" as the fourth single from the album and first from the special album "Colour Me Red", released in October 2014.

== Singles ==
The single "30 Sexy" was unveiled on December 30, 2013, the same day he released image teasers for it. Being one of the two title tracks, "30 Sexy" is said to be similar to "Ways to Avoid the Sun" and will showcase his vocals as well as "sexy and mature charms". On New Year's Day, Loen Entertainment released the official video directed by direction team The Lumpens whom directed for Cho Yong Pil's "Bounce", the same day as the "La Song" video. The video is performance-based using 3D designs and light and visual effects to illustrate the choreography done by in both group and solo performance shots. The song peaked at number 8 on the K-pop Hot 100 and number 12 on Gaon. The song won first place on Mnet's M Countdown on January 9.

A music video teaser for the second single "La Song" was unveiled on December 30, 2013. "La Song" has described as "a fusion of old school hip hop, electronica, rock and funk music". Along with the official video for "30 Sexy", Loen Entertainment released the official video for "La Song," also directed by The Lumpens. The video showcases Rain in a multicultural, bohemian world dancing with various groups of people. The song peaked at number 8 on Gaon and number 6 on the K-pop Hot 100. It won first place on KBS's Music Bank on January 10. Upon the reveal of the album's special edition, it was announced that "I Love You" would serve as the promotional single. A music video for the song was released on February 7.

== Promotion ==
Rain began promoting the album with an interview and performances of "La Song" and "Marilyn Monroe" on The Cultwo Show on SBS Power FM. Rain began promoting his comeback album on various music programs, starting on the January 9, 2014, broadcast of Mnet's M Countdown. This was followed by performances on KBS's Music Bank, MBC's Music Core, SBS's Inkigayo and SBS MTV's The Show. He performed a special stage at the Golden Disc Awards.

Along with music program performances, Rain held a musical showcase. Mnet began teasing the special by releasing two trailers leading up to the special. He held the special comeback show at the CJ E&M Studio on January 8, 2014, where he performed his brand-new songs. The show was recorded in private, and aired through the cable channel Mnet on January 9. On KBS's You Hee-yeol's Sketchbook, Rain performed "30 Sexy" and "La Song", alongside his previous hits "It's Raining", "Rainism" and "How to Avoid the Sun".

== Accolades ==
Awards and nominations for "30 Sexy"
| Year | Organization | Award | Result | Ref. |
|---|---|---|---|---|
| 2014 | Mnet Asian Music Awards | Best Solo Dance Performance | Nominated | |
| 2014 | World Music Awards | World's Best Song | Nominated | |
| 2014 | World Music Awards | World's Best Music Video | Nominated | |

Music program awards
| Song | Program | Date |
|---|---|---|
| "30 Sexy" | M Countdown | January 9, 2014 |
| "La Song" | Music Bank | January 10, 2014 |

== Track listing ==
All lyrics are written by Jung Ji-hoon.

Rain Effect – Standard edition
| No. | Title | Music | Length |
|---|---|---|---|
| 1. | "Rain Effect" | JR Groove, Jung Ji-hoon | 0:35 |
| 2. | "30 Sexy" | JR Groove, Jung Ji-hoon | 3:35 |
| 3. | "La Song" | JR Groove, Jung Ji-hoon | 3:11 |
| 4. | "Oppa" (어디 가요. 오빠; featuring Hyuna) | JR Groove, Jung Ji-hoon | 3:15 |
| 5. | "Marilyn Monroe" (마릴린 먼로) | JR Groove, Jung Ji-hoon | 3:40 |
| 6. | "Baby" (차에 타봐) | JR Groove, Jung Ji-hoon, Jung Woo-young (Ai2P) | 4:00 |
| 7. | "Superman" | JR Groove, Jung Ji-hoon, Hwang Hye-kyung | 3:16 |
| 8. | "Found Out" (알아버렸어) | JR Groove, Jung Ji-hoon | 3:51 |
| 9. | "Dear Mama Don't Cry" | JR Groove, Jung Ji-hoon | 3:36 |
| 10. | "30 Sexy" (East4A Deeptech Mix) | JR Groove, Jung Ji-hoon | 3:14 |
| Total length: | | | 31:13 |

Rain Effect – Special edition
| No. | Title | Music | Length |
|---|---|---|---|
| 10. | "I Love You" (사랑해) | | 4:07 |
| 11. | "30 Sexy" (East4A Deeptech Mix) | JR Groove, Jung Ji-hoon | 3:14 |
| Total length: | | | 35:20 |

== Credits and personnel ==
- Jung Ji-hoon – vocal, songwriter, producer, executive producer
- Bae Jin-ryeol (JR Groove) – producer
- Jung Wooyoung – producer
- Hwang Hye-kyung – producer

== Chart performance ==
=== Album charts ===
| Version | Chart | Peak positions | Sales |
|---|---|---|---|
| Rain Effect | South Korea Weekly Albums (Gaon) | 1 | KOR: 35,685 |
| Rain Effect | South Korea Monthly Albums (Gaon) | 4 | KOR: 35,685 |
| Rain Effect Special Edition | South Korea Weekly Albums (Gaon) | 10 | KOR: 3,756 |
| Rain Effect Special Edition | South Korea Monthly Albums (Gaon) | 31 | KOR: 3,756 |

=== Charted songs ===
| Title | Peak positions | | | Digital sales | Ref. |
| Title | KOR Weekly | KOR Monthly | KOR Hot | Digital sales | Ref. |
|---|---|---|---|---|---|
| "30 Sexy" | 12 | 18 | 8 | KOR: 278,319 | |
| "La Song" | 8 | 9 | 6 | KOR: 759,404 | |
| "I Love You" | 26 | 52 | 23 | KOR: 117,692 | |
| "Marilyn Monroe" | 126 | — | — | KOR: 26,232 | |
| "Baby" | 157 | — | — | KOR: 13,280 | |
| "Found Out" | 177 | — | — | KOR: 11,594 | |
| "Superman" | 178 | — | — | KOR: 11,510 | |
| "Dear Mama, Don't Cry" | 182 | — | — | KOR: 11,213 | |
| "Rain Effect" | 192 | — | — | KOR: 9,808 | |

== Release history ==
| Country | Date | Format | Edition | Label |
|---|---|---|---|---|
| South Korea | January 2, 2014 | CD, digital download | Standard | Cube DC, Loen Entertainment |
| Worldwide | January 2, 2014 | CD, digital download | Standard | Cube DC, Loen Entertainment |
| South Korea | February 7, 2014 | Digital download | Repackage | Cube DC, Loen Entertainment |
| South Korea | February 11, 2014 | CD | Repackage | Cube DC, Loen Entertainment |
