= 2006 Mnet KM Music Festival =

8th edition of the MAMA Awards held in 2006

- Date: November 25, 2006
- Location: Olympic Gymnastics Arena, Seoul, South Korea
- Hosted by: Shin Dong-yup and Kim Ok-vin
- Most awards: TVXQ, SG Wannabe (2)
- Most nominations: TVXQ, Rain, SG Wannabe (5)
- Website: Mnet KM Music Video Festival

Television/radio coverage
- Network: Mnet (South Korea); Mnet Japan (Japan)
- Runtime: Approximately 210 minutes

The 2006 Mnet KM Music Festival (MKMF) took place on November 25, 2006, at the Olympic Gymnastics Arena in Seoul, South Korea. It was hosted by comedian Shin Dong-yup and actress Kim Ok-vin. The most awarded artists were boy bands TVXQ and SG Wannabe winning two of their five nominations.

== Background ==
The award ceremony was held for the eighth consecutive time. The Grand Prize (Daesang) were Artist of the Year, Song of the Year, and Album of the Year. The event took place at the Olympic Gymnastics Arena for the second time with Shin Dong-yup and Kim Ok-vin as hosts.

== Performers ==
Artist(s)	Song(s)	Notes
DJ Seo Jungeum, Harim ( Trans Fixion ) & Lee Sangwoo ( No Brain )	"Mr. Brightside", "You're Falling in to Me"	Performance #1: I Love Punk
SS501, 스키조(Schizo)	"Unlock"	Performance #2: Break Through
Uhm Jung-hwa, CocoBoys and DodoGirls	Uhm Jung-Hwa House Mix, "Boogie Wonderland", "Friday Night"	Performance #3: Return of the Queen
Super Junior	"U", "Don't Go Away", "Miracle"	Performance #4: Super Idol
Lee Seung-gi and Kim Ok-vin	"Like I Love You", "Don't Cha", "Get Up"	Performance #5: Crazy For U"
SG Wannabe, Kim Tae-woo, Kim Jo Han	"My Reflection In My Heart", "Gloomy Letter", "Cause I Love You", "Old Days"	Performance #6: Because I Love
Yen (Kinetic Music Group), Baek Ji-young	"I Won't Love"	Performance #7: Living Thing Like A Flower
TVXQ	"'O'-Jung.Ban.Hap."	Performance #8: Five Star Story
W-inds	"Boogie Woogie 66", "Four Seasons"	Performance #9: Friend, Tomo
Brown Eyed Girls, Cho PD, SeeYa, Super Junior, SS501	"Free Music"	Performance #10: Free Music Kills Musician
Westlife	"You Raise Me Up"	Background song: End credits

== Presenters ==
2006 Mnet KM Music Festival hosts

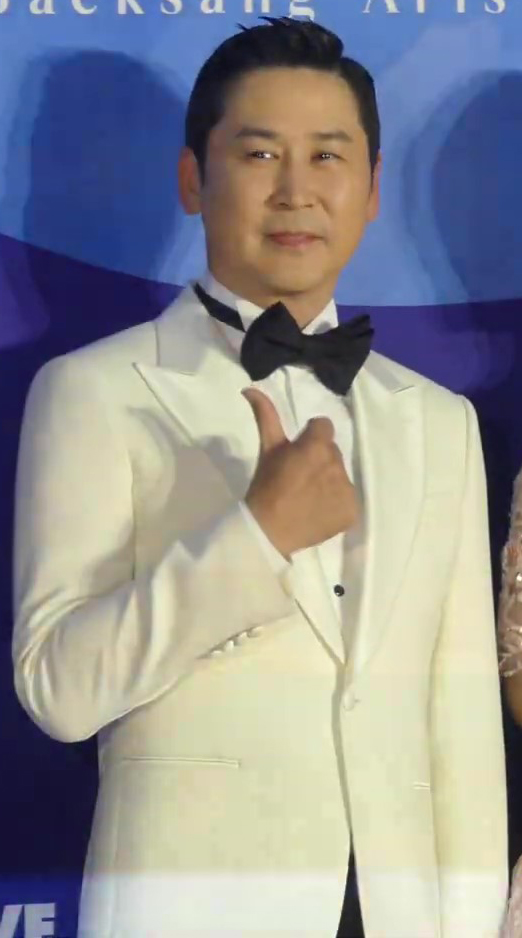
Shin Dong-yup

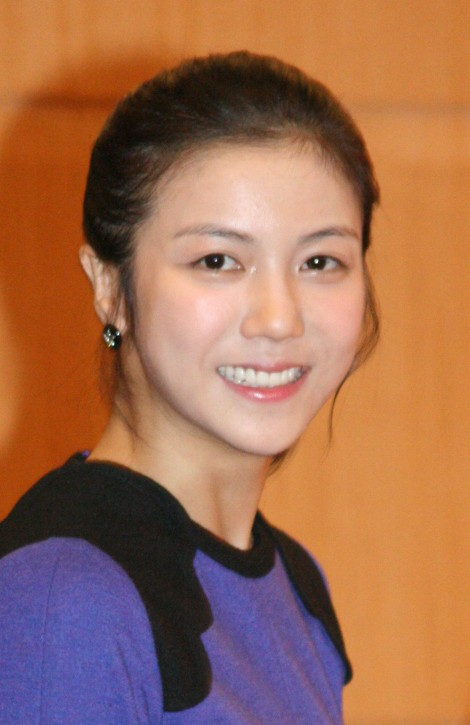
Kim Ok-vin

Name(s)	Role
Shin Dong-yup and Kim Ok-vin	Main hosts of the show
Jang Keun-suk and Go Eun-ah	Presenters for the award for New Singer of the Year
SS501	Presenters for the award for New Group of the Year
Park Si-yeon, Shin Yi (신이) and Jae Hee	Presenters for the special award for Digital Popularity Award
Kim Cheol-min and Kim Mi-Ryeo with Son Jeong-hwan (손정환)	Presenters for the special award for YEPP Netizen Popularity Award
Ha Seok-jin and Cha Ye-ryun	Presenters for the award for Best R&B Performance
Kang Ho-dong and Kim Ah-joong	Presenters for the award for Best Dance Performance
Daniel Henney	Introduced the comeback of "The Queen of K-pop" Uhm Jung-hwa
Jung Jae-young	Segment host
Oh Hyemi (나헤미) and Noh Hong-chul	Presenters for the special award for Mnet.com Award
Denis Kang and Hye-kyung	Presenters for the award for Best Rock Performance
Park Si-hoo and So Yoo-jin	Presenters for the award for Best Group
Ryu Deok-hwan and Uhm Jung-hwa	Presenters for the award for Music Video Acting
Lee So-yeon and Park Kwang-hyun (박광현)	Presenters for the award for Best Music Video
Lee Beom-soo	Presenter for the award for Album of the Year
Jisun of Loveholic	Introduced the sixth performance
Namolla Family	Presenters for the award for Best Hip Hop Performance
Ji Hyun-woo and Im Jung-eun	Presenters for the award for Best Ballad Performance
Baek Sung-hyun, Ayumi, and Kim Ji-hoon	Presenters for the Overseas Viewers' Award
On Joo-wan	Introduced Performance #8
MC Mong and Kim Soo-mi	Presenters for the Mnet Plus Mobile Popularity Award
Uhm Ji-won and Yoo Gun	Presenters for the award for Best Female Artist
Jang Yoon-ju, 박둘선, and Kyung A-song (송경아)	Presenters for the award for Best Male Artist
BoA	Introduced Performance #9 and presenter for the award for Best Asia Pop Artist
Kim Jin-pyo	Introduced Mnet KM's Selection Awards Committee – Radio Star (Lee Joon-ik)
Lee Dong-wook and Lee Da-hae	Presenters for the award for Song of the Year
Kim Jung-eun	Presenter for the award for Artist of the Year

== Selection process ==
The following criteria for winners include:

Preference by Professional Research Organizations	30%
Viewers' Vote via the Internet Mobile	20%
Professional Jury Screening	20%
Album Sales	10%
Integrated Digital Sales Chart	10%
Nominations Selection Committee Score	10%
Total	100%

== Winners and nominees ==
Winners are listed first and highlighted in boldface.

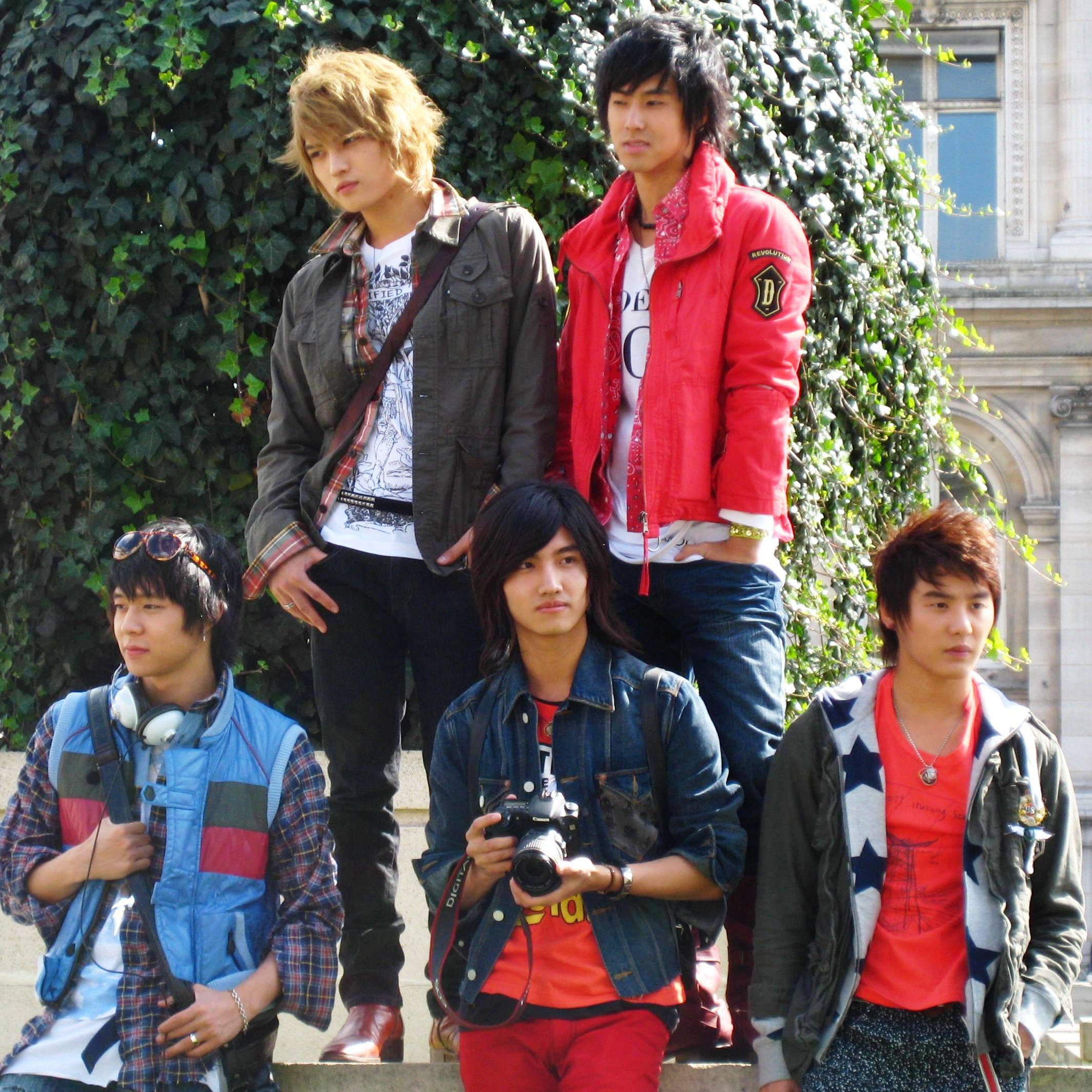
TVXQ won Artist of the Year, Best Group, and others

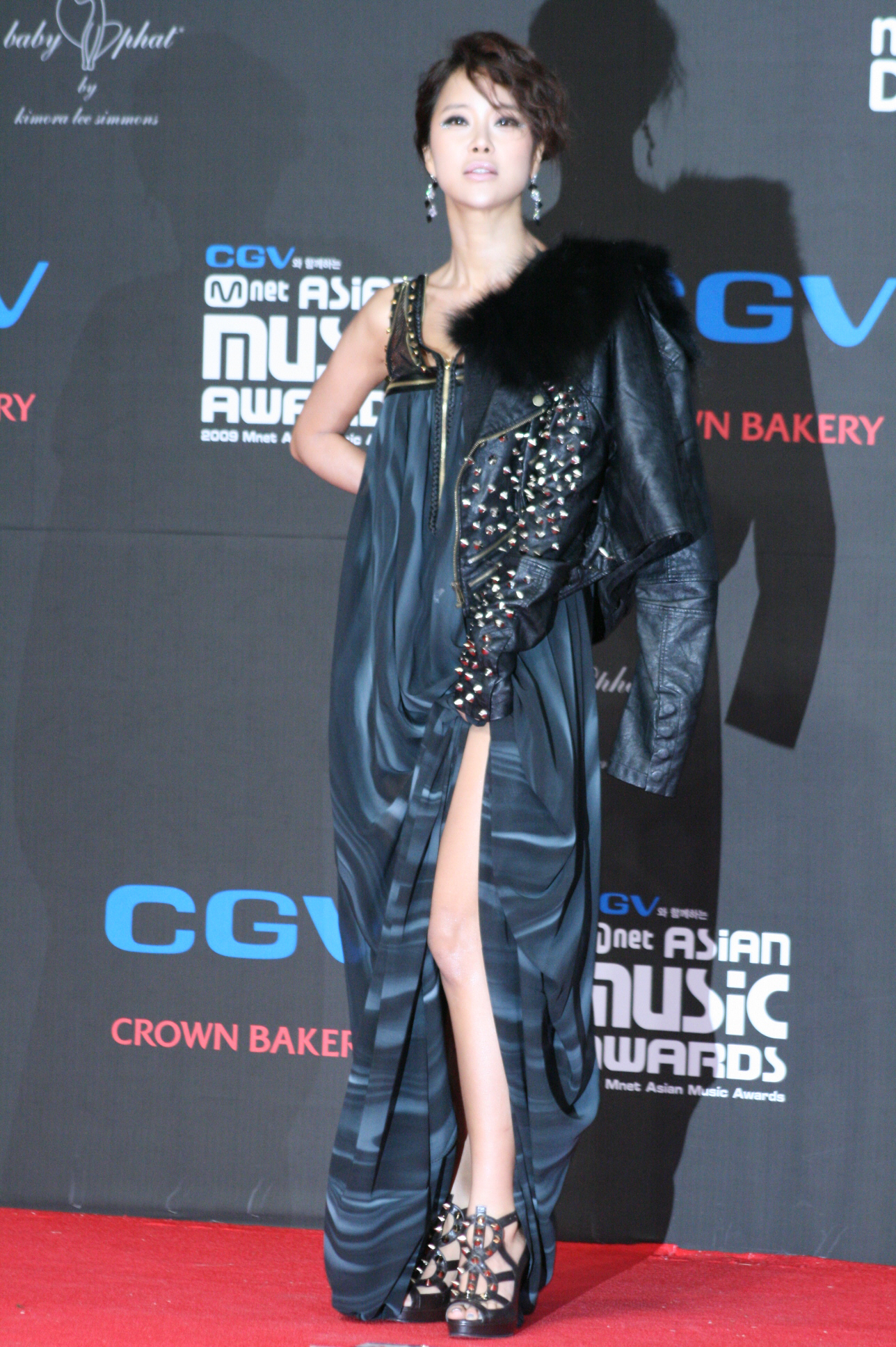
Baek Ji-young won Best Female Artist

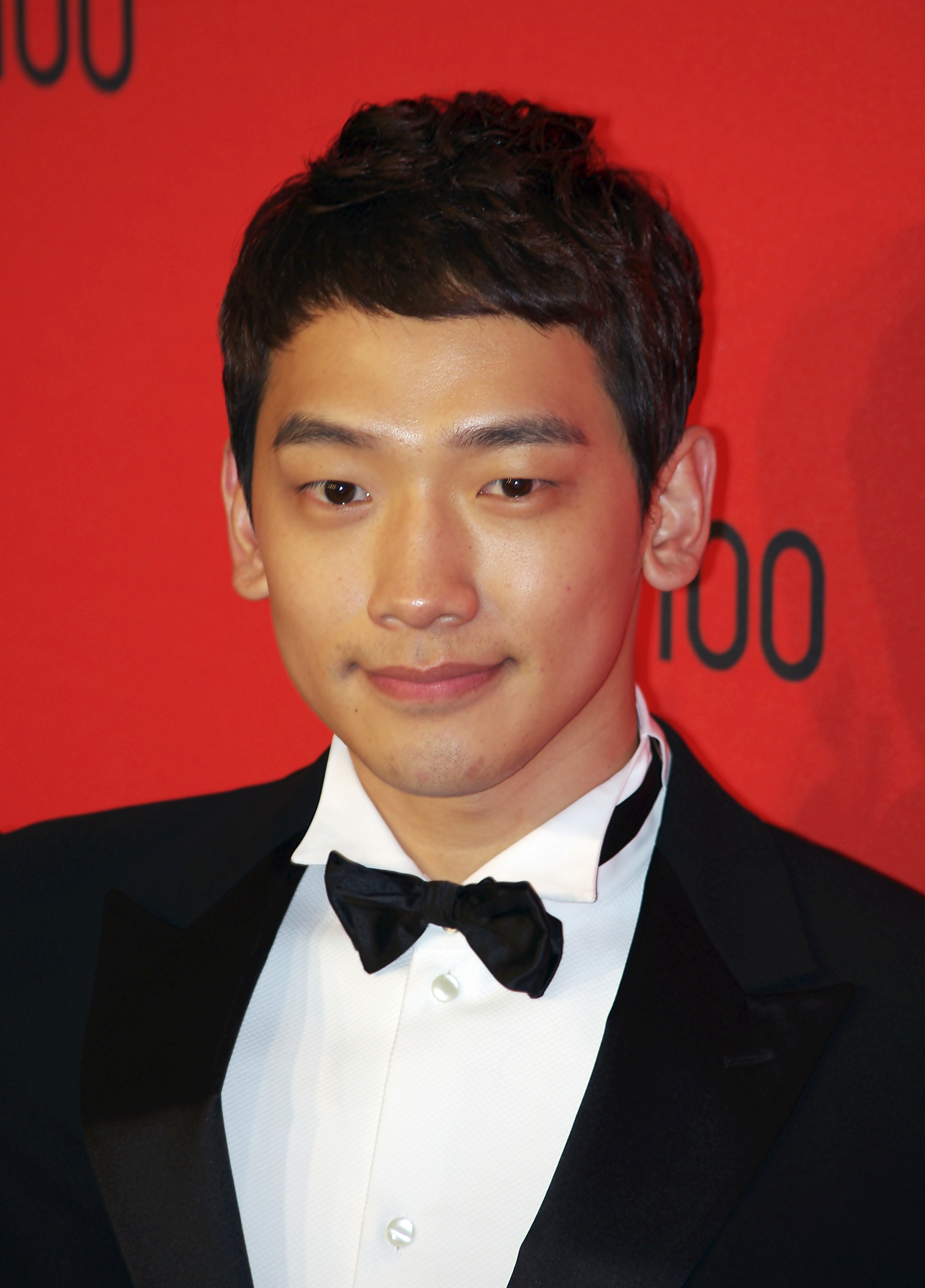
Rain won Best Male Artist

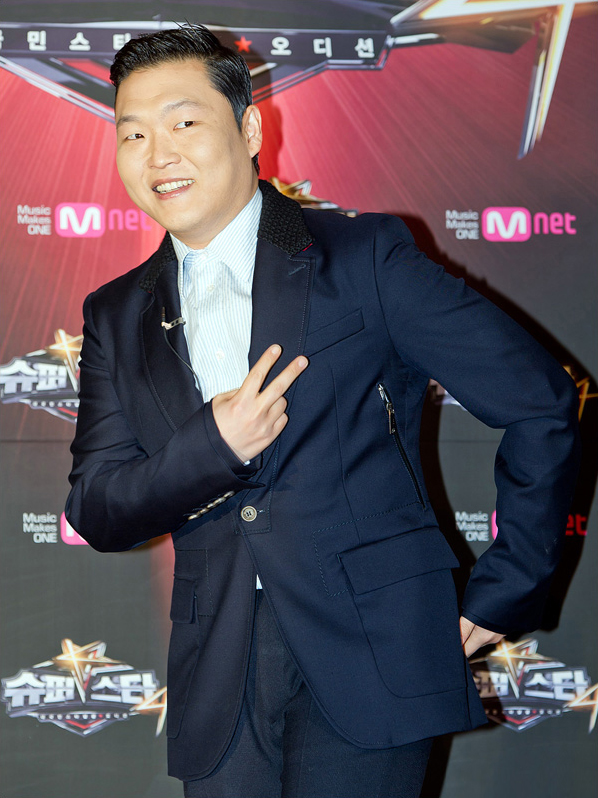
Psy won Best Music Video

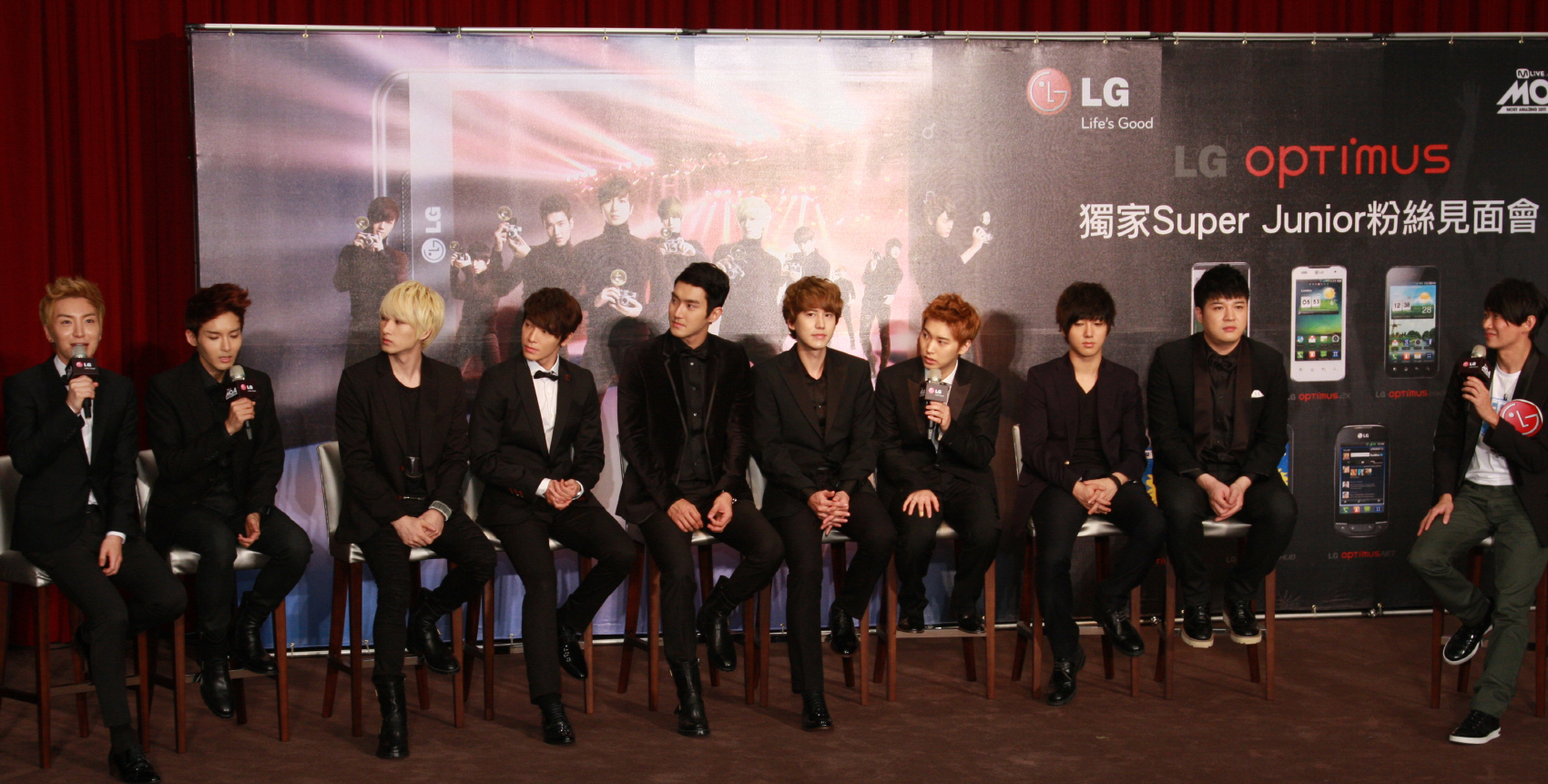
Super Junior won New Group of the Year

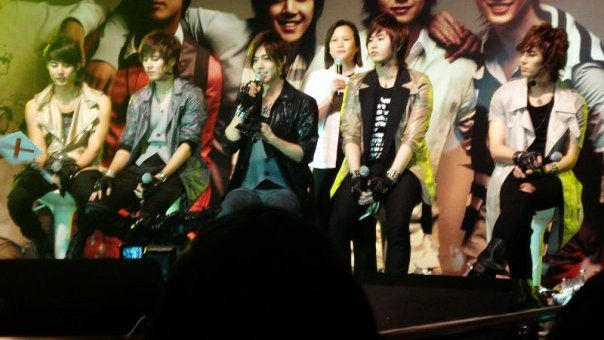
SS501 won Best Dance Performers

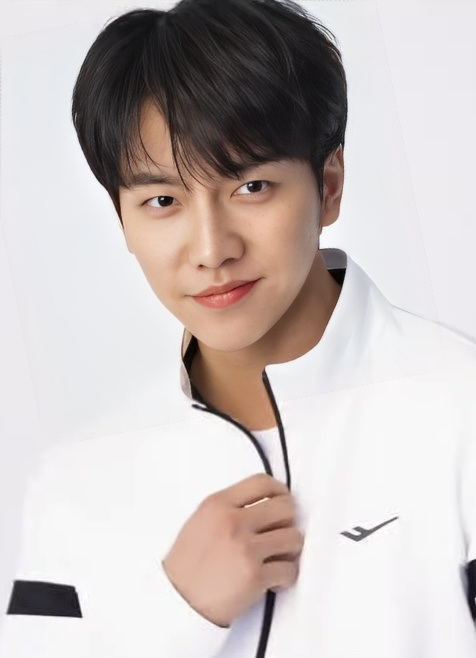
Lee Seung-gi won Best Ballad Performer

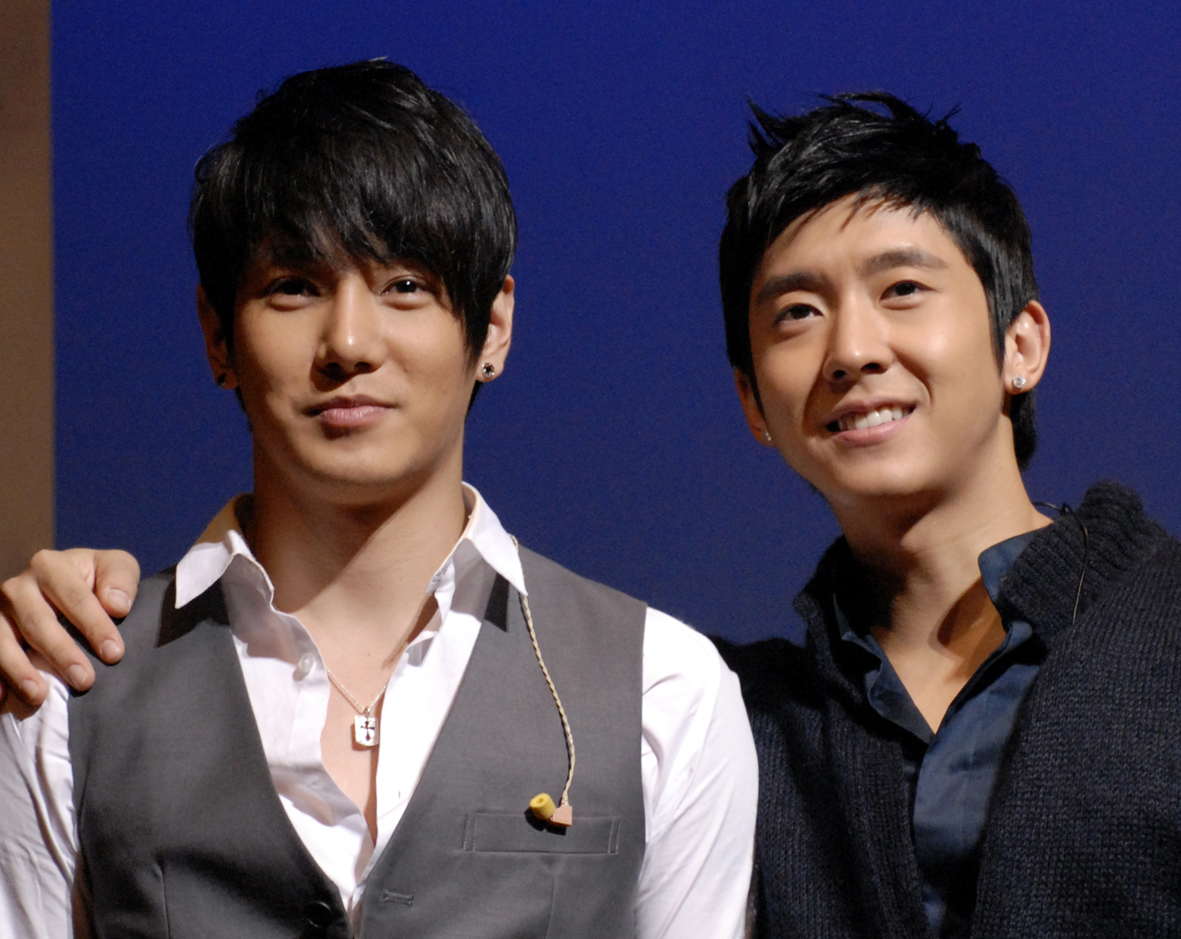
Fly To The Sky won Best R&B Performers

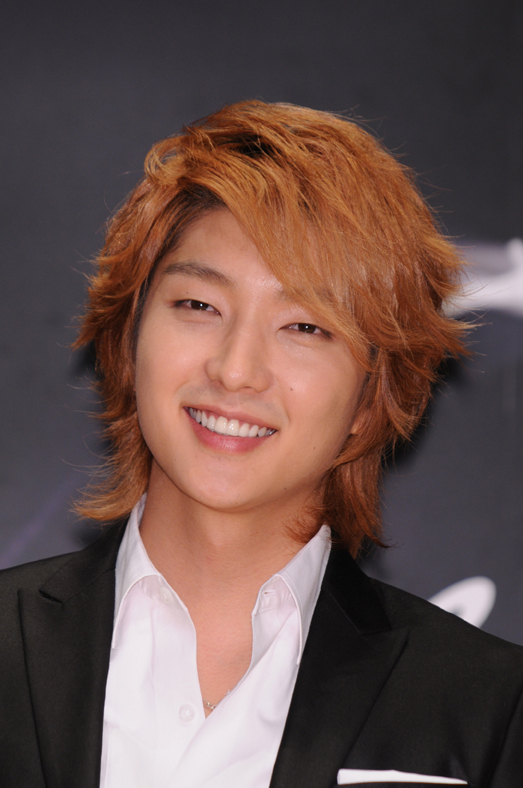
Lee Joon-gi won Music Video Actor

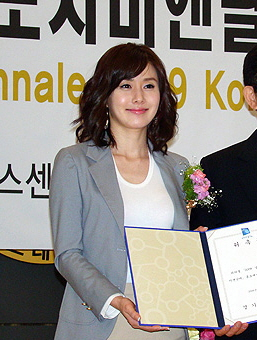
Kim Ji-soo won Music Video Actress

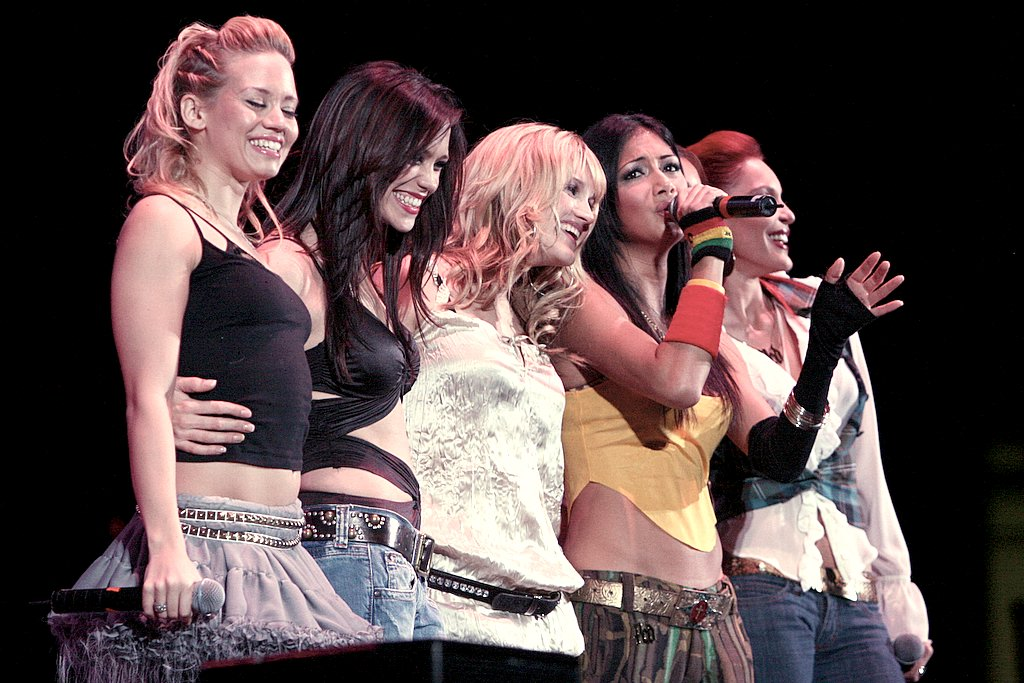
The Pussycat Dolls won Best International Artist

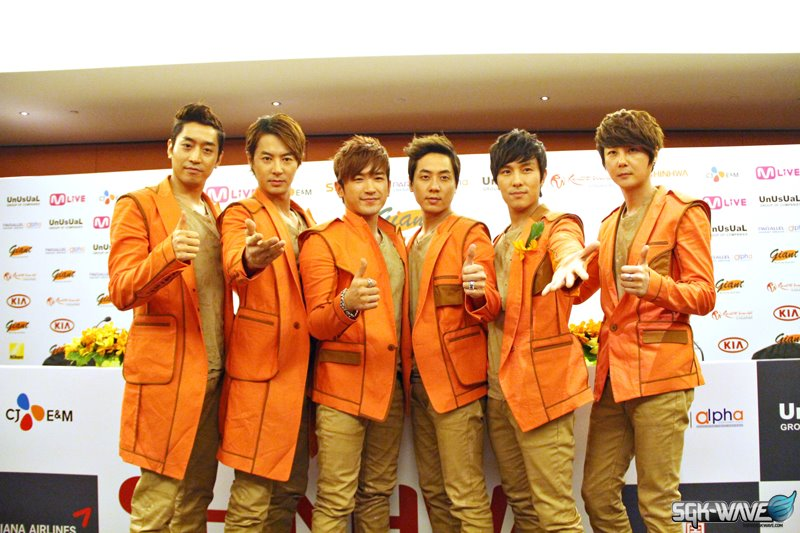
Shinhwa won Popularity and Viewer's Choice awards

Artist of the Year (Daesang)	Song of the Year (Daesang)
**TVXQ**; Baek Ji-young; Buzz; Rain; SG Wannabe	**SG Wannabe – "Partner for Life"**; TVXQ – "'O'-Jung.Ban.Hap."; Vibe – "That Man That Woman"; Baek Ji-young – "I Won't Love"; Buzz – "You Don't Know Man"
Album of the Year (Daesang)	Best Music Video
**SG Wannabe – The 3rd Masterpiece**; TVXQ – "O"-Jung.Ban.Hap.; Vibe – Re Feel; Rain – Rain's World; Shinhwa – State of the Art	**Psy – "Entertainer" (Director: Cha Eun-taek)**; Dynamic Duo – "Go Back" (Director: Min Bang-chaeng); Vibe – "The Man The Woman" (Director: Park Myung-jin); Rain – "I'm Coming" (Director: Jang Jae-hyeok); YB – "Today" (Director: Hwang Bom-seon)
New Singer of the Year	New Group of the Year
**Zhang Liyin – "Timeless" (ft. Xiah Junsu)**; MayBee – "Much Laugh" (다소); Boom – "Boom Up" ft. Kim Bum; Suho – "Spring, Summer, Fall... Winter" ft. Kim Tae-woo; Crown J – "V.I.P"	**Super Junior – "U"**; Brown Eyed Girls – "Come Closer"; Big Bang – "La La La"; SeeYa – "Scent of a Woman"; Typhoon – "So" (그래서)
Best Group	Best Dance Performance
**TVXQ – "'O'-Jung.Ban.Hap."**; SS501 – "Snow Prince"; Buzz – "You Don't Know Man"; Shinhwa – "Once In A Lifetime"; SG Wannabe – "Partner For Life"	**SS501 – "Snow Prince"**; Turtles – "Airplane"; TVXQ – "'O'-Jung.Ban.Hap."; Rain – "I'm Coming"; Super Junior – "U"
Best Male Artist	Best Female Artist
**Rain – "I'm Coming"**; Psy – "Entertainer"; Seven – "I Know"; Lee Seung-gi – "Hard to Say"; Lee Seung-chul – "Scream"	**Baek Ji-young – "I Won't Love"**; Bada – "V.I.P"; Park Jung-ah – "Yeah"; Lee Soo-young – "Grace"; Lee Hyori – "Shall We Dance?"
Best R&B Performance	Best Rock Performance
**Fly To The Sky – "Like a Man"**; Vibe – "The Man The Woman"; SeeYa – "Crazy Love Song"; SG Wannabe – "Partner For Life"; Lim Jeong-hee – "Traces"	**Buzz – "You Don't Know Man"**; Nell – "Losing My Mind"; Rumble Fish – "I Go"; YB – "Today"; Cherry Filter – "Happy Day"
Best Hip Hop Performance	Best Ballad Performance
**MC Mong – "Ice Cream"**; Dynamic Duo – "Go Back"; Baechigi – "Turn A Deaf Ear"; Yang Dong-geun (YDG) – "Go To Hong Kong"; Uptown – "My Style"	**Lee Seung-gi – "Hard to Say"**; Baek Ji-young – "I Won't Love"; Sung Si-kyung – "On The Street"; Lee Soo-young – "Grace"; Ha Dong Kyun – "Please Love Her"
Music Video Acting	Best Music Video Director
**Lee Joon-gi – "Grace" (by Lee Soo-young)** (Male category); **Kim Ji-soo – "That Man That Woman" (by Vibe)** (Female category)	**Cha Eun-taek – "Entertainer" by Psy & "Hard To Say" by Lee Seung-gi**; Min Bang-chaeng -"Go Back" By Dynamic Duo; Park Myung-jin – "The Man The Woman" By Vibe; Jang Jae-hyeok – "I'm Coming" By Rain; Hwang Bom-seon – "Today" By YB
Best International Artist	Best OST
**The Pussycat Dolls – "Buttons"**	**SeeYa – "Crazy Love Song"**

=== Special awards ===
- Digital Popularity Award: **SG Wannabe** **– "Partner for Life"**
- YEPP Netizen Popularity Award: **Shinhwa** **– "Once in a Lifetime"**
- Creative Sector
  - Composition Award: **Jo Young-su (조영수) – "Partner for Life"** (by SG Wannabe)
  - Lyrics Award: **Ahn Young-min (안영민)** **– "Crazy Love Song"** (by SeeYa)
  - Arrangement Award: **Ryu Jae-hyun (류재현)** **– "The Man The Woman"** (by Vibe)
- Mnet.com Award: **TVXQ** – **"'O'-Jung.Ban.Hap."**
- Overseas Viewers' Award: **Shinhwa** **– "Once In A Lifetime"**
- Mnet Plus Mobile Popularity Award: **TVXQ** **– "'O'-Jung.Ban.Hap."**
- Best Asia Pop Artist: **W-inds**

== Multiple nominations and awards ==
=== Artist(s) with multiple wins ===
The following artist(s) received two or more wins (excluding the special awards):

Awards	Artist(s)
2	TVXQ
2	SG Wannabe

=== Artist(s) with multiple nominations ===
The following artist(s) received more than two nominations:

Nominations	Artist(s)
5	TVXQ
5	Rain
5	SG Wannabe
4	Baek Ji-young
4	Buzz
4	Vibe
3	The SeeYa
