= Back to the Basic =

EP by Rain
- Released: April 7, 2010
- Recorded: 2009–2010
- Genres: K-pop; R&B
- Length: 17:03
- Languages: Korean; Japanese
- Labels: J. Tune; CJ E&M; Tokuma
- Producers: Jung Ji-hoon; JR Groove; Kim Tae-wan (C-Luv); Jang Young-chan

Rain chronology
Rainism (2008)	Back to the Basic (2010)	Rain Effect (2013)

Japanese edition cover

Singles from Back to the Basic
- 1. "Love Song" Released: April 7, 2010; 2. "Hip Song" Released: April 7, 2010

Back to the Basic is the first Korean-language extended play by South Korean recording artist Rain. It was his first release since his Korean-language studio album Rainism (2008).

Commercially, the EP peaked at number one on the Gaon Album Chart and number 25 on the Oricon Albums Chart. It sold more than 56,000 copies in South Korea and 8,000 copies in Japan as of 2013.

== Background ==
As a farewell to his fans before going for 21 months of compulsory military service, Rain toured throughout Asia including Indonesia, Japan, Korea, China, Taiwan, Hong Kong and Singapore. This was the first tour where Rain traveled throughout Korea with stops in Busan, Guangzhou, Jeju, Daegu, Daejeon and Seoul.

== Reception ==
The EP sold over 53,584 copies in South Korea and was the 26th best-selling album of 2010. In Japan, the EP sold over 8,000 copies. The Japanese version was released with a different cover, a Japanese version of "Love Song" and a DVD with a making of as well as the "Love Song" music video.

=== Accolades ===
Music program awards for "Love Song"
Program	Date	Ref.
M Countdown	April 8, 2010	
M Countdown	April 15, 2010	
Music Bank	April 16, 2010	
Music Bank	April 23, 2010	
Music Bank	April 30, 2010	
Inkigayo	April 18, 2010	

== Promotion and live performances ==
On November 27, 2010, Rain performed the song "Hip Song" as well as two other songs at the 2010 Asian Games closing ceremony in Guangzhou, China.

As a farewell to his fans before going into the military, Rain held his fourth concert tour in Asia, titled The Best Show Tour, beginning in March 2011. The tour spanned 16 shows in numerous countries in Asia including South Korea, Japan, China, Singapore, Indonesia. The tour concluded with a free concert in Gangnam in October 2011, prior to his military enlistment.

== Track listing ==
Back to the Basic – Korean edition
No.	Title	Lyrics	Music	Length
1.	"Love Song" (널 붙잡을 노래; Neol Butjabeul Norae)	Jung Ji-hoon	Jung Ji-hoon, Groove Network	3:46
2.	"Hip Song"	Jung Ji-hoon	Jung Ji-hoon, JR Groove	3:14
3.	"One"	Kim Tae-wan (C-Luv)	Kim Tae-wan (C-Luv), Jang Young-chan	3:01
4.	"Same" (똑같아; Ttokgata)	Kim Tae-wan (C-Luv)	Kim Tae-wan (C-Luv)	3:01
5.	"Love Song" (널 붙잡을 노래; Neol Butjabeul Norae (English Version))	Jung Ji-hoon	Jung Ji-hoon, Groove Network	3:46
Total length:				17:03

Back to the Basic – Japanese edition
No.	Title	Lyrics	Music	Length
6.	"Love Song" (널 붙잡을 노래; Neol Butjabeul Norae (Japanese Version))	Jung Ji-hoon	Jung Ji-hoon, Groove Network	3:46
Total length:				20:49

DVD – Japanese edition
No.	Title	Length
1.	"Love Song" (널 붙잡을 노래; Neol Butjabeul Norae (Japanese Version) (video))
Total length:		20:00

== Charts ==
=== Weekly charts ===
Chart (2010)	Peak position
Japanese Albums (Oricon)	25
South Korean Albums (Gaon)	1

=== Monthly charts ===
Chart (2010)	Peak position
South Korean Albums (Gaon)	1

=== Year-end charts ===
Chart (2010)	Position
South Korean Albums (Gaon)	26
