= Race to Freedom: Um Bok Dong =

Race to Freedom: Uhm Bok-dong
- Theatrical release poster
- Hangul: 자전차왕 엄복동
- RR: Jajeonchawang Eom Bokdong
- MR: Chajŏnch'awang Ŏm Poktong
- Directed by: Kim Yoo-sung
- Written by: Kim Yoo-sung
- Produced by: Lee Beom-soo
- Starring: Rain; Kang So-ra; Lee Beom-soo
- Cinematography: Park Yong-soo
- Edited by: Park Gok-ji; Lee Yoon-hee
- Music by: Choi Yong-rak; Lee Ji-yeon
- Production company: Celltrion Entertainment
- Distributed by: Celltrion Entertainment
- Release date: February 27, 2019
- Running time: 116 minutes
- Country: South Korea
- Language: Korean
- Budget: US$13 million
- Box office: US$1.1 million

Race to Freedom: Uhm Bok-dong (Korean: 자전차왕 엄복동) is a 2019 South Korean biographical drama film directed and written by Kim Yoo-sung. It stars Rain as a legendary cyclist Uhm Bok-dong.

This film was a critical and commercial failure, and is considered to be one of the worst South Korean films ever made.

== Plot ==
Based on the true story of famed cyclist Uhm Bok-dong, who became a symbol of pride for Koreans when he defeated Japanese cyclists and won the championship in a bicycle race which took place during the Japanese colonial rule of Korea.

== Cast ==
- Rain as Uhm Bok-dong
- Kang So-ra as Kim Hyung-shin
- Lee Beom-soo as Hwang Jae-ho
- Min Hyo-rin as Kyeong-ja
- Shin Cheol-jin as Oil Shop Owner
- Jo Seo-hoo as Miki
- Oh Min-ae as Sang-goong
- Park Jin-joo as Bong-seon
- Ko Chang-seok as Ahn Do-min
- Lee Geung-young as Um Bok-dong's father
- Lee Si-eon as Lee Hong-dae
- Lee Won-jong as Choi Jae-pil
- Hwang Hee as Long sword provost officer

== Production ==
Principal photography began on April 18, 2017, and wrapped on September 29, 2017.

== Reception ==
The film was considered widely among Korean audiences as a massive flop, and a meme about the film having attracted the lowest audiences in South Korean film has given birth to a meme that uses the number of people who watched the film, which was about 170,000, as a unit called 'UBD".

=== Controversy ===
The film got into a controversy because of Um's past as a thief.
