= List of Rain live performances =

Rain live performances
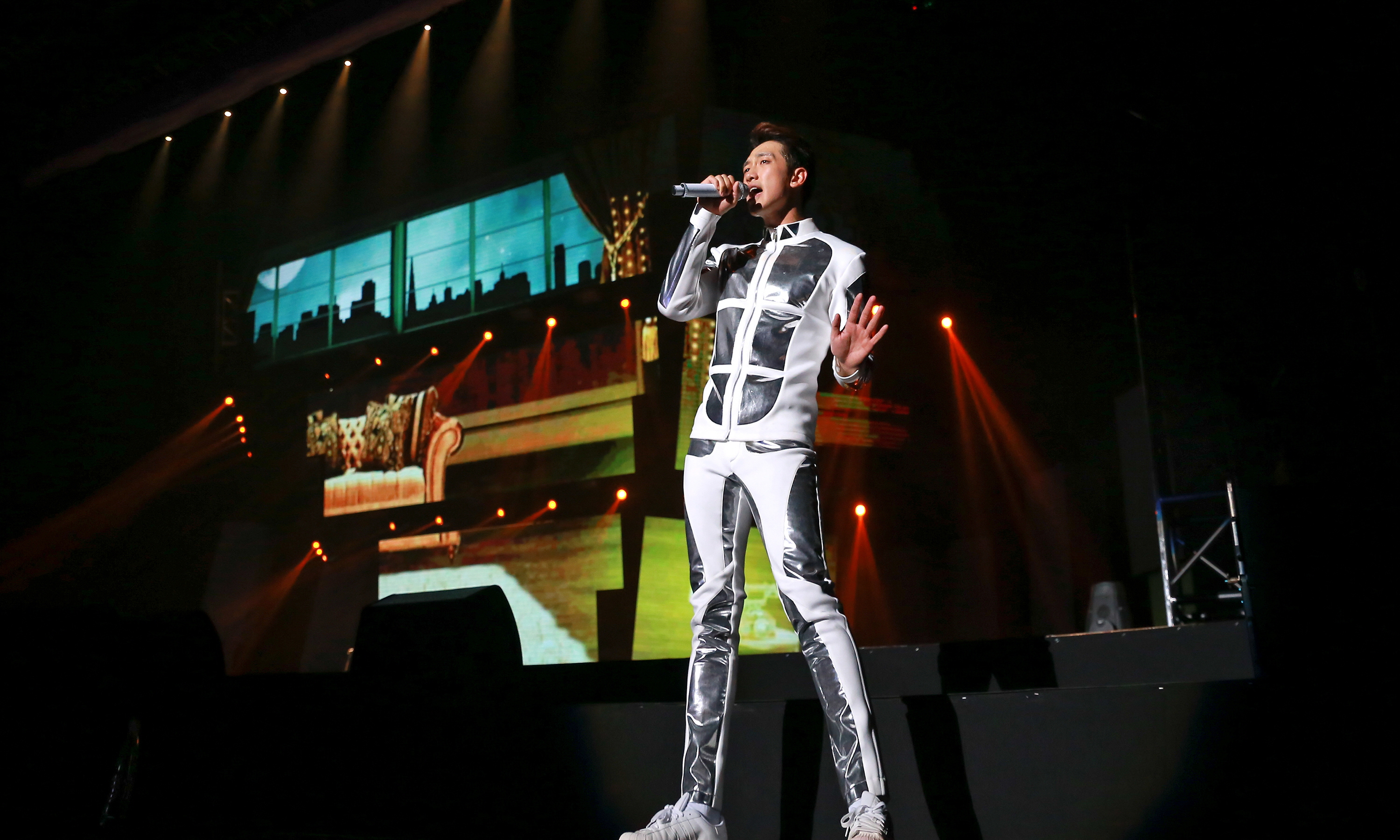
- Rain performing during The Squall Tour in Shenzhen in 2015
- Asia tours: 4
- World tours: 2

South Korean singer, songwriter, dancer, actor, and record producer Rain has embarked on five headlining concert tours, two of which have been worldwide. He debuted with the studio album Bad Guy in May 2002, and released his sophomore studio album It's Raining in October 2004.

After the release of It's Raining, Rain embarked on his first concert tour in support of the album in January 2005, titled the Rainy Day Tour. His concert at the Workers' Stadium in Beijing held that October drew an audience of 40,000 people. The tour expanded internationally in February 2006 with two concerts at the Theater at Madison Square Garden in New York City, making Rain the first South Korean idol singer to have played at a major venue in the city.

In 2006, Rain embarked on his second concert tour titled the Rain's Coming World Tour in support of his album Rain's World (2006). It held shows in various Asian countries including South Korea, Japan, China, as well as the United States and Australia. On May 25, 2007, he became the first South Korean singer to hold a solo concert at the Tokyo Dome, which attracted 40,000 people. The tour concluded in October 2007 at the Daegu Stadium with 25,000 people in attendance. Rain has held several concert tours since, including the Still Raining Tour that began in November 2023, which saw him performing in the United States for the first time in nearly 15 years.

== Rainy Day Tour ==
=== Background ===
Rainy Day Tour
- Tour by Rain
- Associated album: It's Raining
- Start date: January 29, 2005
- End date: February 26, 2006
- No. of shows: 19

Rain concert chronology
- Rainy Day Tour (2005–06); Rain's Coming World Tour (2006–07)

To promote It's Raining, Rain held his first concert tour, the Rainy Day Tour, that spanned Seoul, the US, Japan, China, Singapore, and more, for a total of 19 concerts in several countries in Asia and North America. His first show in Japan held at the Tokyo International Forum sold out in 30 seconds. His New York show at The Theater at Madison Square Garden was the largest concert by a K-pop artist in New York City at the time, and featured appearances from Park Ji-yoon, as well as JoJo, P. Diddy and Omarion.

Tour dates
Date	City	Country	Venue	Attendance
January 29, 2005	Seoul	South Korea	Olympic Hall	80,000
January 30, 2005	Seoul	South Korea	Olympic Hall	80,000
February 26, 2005	Busan	South Korea	KBS Busan Hall	80,000
February 27, 2005	Busan	South Korea	KBS Busan Hall	80,000
July 30, 2005	Tokyo	Japan	Tokyo International Forum	80,000
July 31, 2005	Tokyo	Japan	Tokyo International Forum	80,000
August 3, 2005	Osaka	Japan	Orix Theater	80,000
August 4, 2005	Osaka	Japan	Orix Theater	80,000
September 2, 2005	Tokyo	Japan	Nippon Budokan	80,000
September 3, 2005	Tokyo	Japan	Nippon Budokan	80,000
October 8, 2005	Hong Kong	China	Hong Kong Convention and Exhibition Centre	80,000
October 9, 2005	Hong Kong	China	Hong Kong Convention and Exhibition Centre	80,000
October 22, 2005	Beijing	China	Workers' Stadium	40,000
December 29, 2005	Taipei	Taiwan	Taipei Arena	28,000
December 30, 2005	Taipei	Taiwan	Taipei Arena	28,000
February 2, 2006	New York City	United States	Theater at Madison Square Garden	10,000
February 3, 2006	New York City	United States	Theater at Madison Square Garden	10,000
February 25, 2006	Bangkok	Thailand	Impact Arena	20,000
February 26, 2006	Bangkok	Thailand	Impact Arena	20,000
Total				178,000

== Legend of Rainism Tour ==
=== Background ===
Legend of Rainism Tour
- Tour by Rain
- Associated album: Rainism
- Start date: August 29, 2009
- End date: April 18, 2010
- No. of shows: 14

Rain concert chronology
- Rain's Coming World Tour (2006–07); Legend of Rainism Tour (2009–10); The Best Show Tour (2011)

In support of his fifth album Rainism, Rain kicked off his third concert tour titled "The Legend of Rainism Tour" in August 2009. It continued with concerts in Japan, Korea, Hong Kong, Indonesia, the United States and Taiwan.

List of tour dates
Date	City	Country	Venue	Attendance
August 29, 2009	Saitama	Japan	Saitama Super Arena	34,000
August 30, 2009	Saitama	Japan	Saitama Super Arena	34,000
October 9, 2009	Seoul	South Korea	Olympic Gymnastics Arena	16,000
October 10, 2009	Seoul	South Korea	Olympic Gymnastics Arena	16,000
November 28, 2009	Hong Kong	China	AsiaWorld-Expo	18,000
November 29, 2009	Hong Kong	China	AsiaWorld-Expo	18,000
December 3, 2009	Jakarta	Indonesia	JITEC Mangga Dua Square	5,000
December 24, 2009	Las Vegas	United States	The Colosseum at Caesars Palace	8,000
December 25, 2009	Las Vegas	United States	The Colosseum at Caesars Palace	8,000
January 23, 2010	Osaka	Japan	Osaka-jō Hall	16,000
January 24, 2010	Osaka	Japan	Osaka-jō Hall	16,000
January 30, 2010	Kaohsiung	Taiwan	Kaohsiung National Stadium	30,000
April 17, 2010	Tokyo	Japan	Yoyogi National Gymnasium	20,000
April 18, 2010	Tokyo	Japan	Yoyogi National Gymnasium	20,000
Total				147,000

== The Best Show Tour ==
=== Background ===
The Best Show Tour
- Tour by Rain
- Associated album: Back to the Basic
- Start date: March 26, 2011
- End date: October 9, 2011
- Legs: 2
- No. of shows: 16

Rain concert chronology
- Legend of Rainism Tour (2009–10); The Best Show Tour (2011); The Squall World Tour (2015–16)

As a farewell to his fans before going into the military, Rain held his fourth concert tour in Asia, titled "The Best Show Tour". The tour held shows in numerous countries including South Korea, Japan, China, Thailand, Taiwan and Singapore.

List of tour dates
Date	City	Country	Venue	Attendance
March 26, 2011	Beijing	China	MasterCard Center	—
May 8, 2011	Bangkok	Thailand	Impact Arena	—
May 14, 2011	Macau	China	Cotai Arena	—
May 15, 2011	Taipei	Taiwan	Nangang Exhibition Center	7,000
May 22, 2011	Singapore		Singapore Indoor Stadium	5,000
May 25, 2011	Shanghai	China	Shanghai Indoor Stadium	—
May 28, 2011	Guangzhou	China	Guangzhou Gymnasium	—
August 13, 2011	Busan	South Korea	Busan Exhibition & Convention Center	—
August 14, 2011	Busan	South Korea	Busan Exhibition & Convention Center	—
August 27, 2011	Daegu	South Korea	Daegu Convention & Exhibition Center	—
September 3, 2011	Jeju City	South Korea	International Convention Center Jeju	—
September 17, 2011	Gwangju	South Korea	Gwangju Rosary Gymnasium	—
September 18, 2011	Daejeon	South Korea	Daejeon Convention Center	—
September 24, 2011	Seoul	South Korea	Olympic Gymnastics Arena	10,000
September 25, 2011	Seoul	South Korea	Olympic Gymnastics Arena	—
October 9, 2011	Seoul	South Korea	Yongdong Avenue, Gangnam (Note: Free concert before military enlistment)	—
Total				N/A

== The Squall World Tour ==
The Squall World Tour
- Tour by Rain
- The Chinese poster for Rain's The Squall Tour
- Start date: November 7, 2015
- End date: December 30, 2016
- Legs: 1
- No. of shows: 17

Rain concert chronology
- The Best Show Asia Tour (2011); The Squall World Tour (2015–16); Still Raining Tour (2023–24)

The Squall World Tour is a concert tour by Korean singer Rain. The tour is to travel Southeast Asia with more dates to be added. This is Rain's first full concert tour after his compulsory military service.

=== History ===
Since ending his military service, Rain has done small tours in Japan and China as well as performing at various events. After parting ways with Cube Entertainment and starting his own company, it was announced that Rain would be going on his first world tour in years. The tour begins in China with dates in Hong Kong and South Korea. Several of the tour dates were sold out, including the shows in Hong Kong.

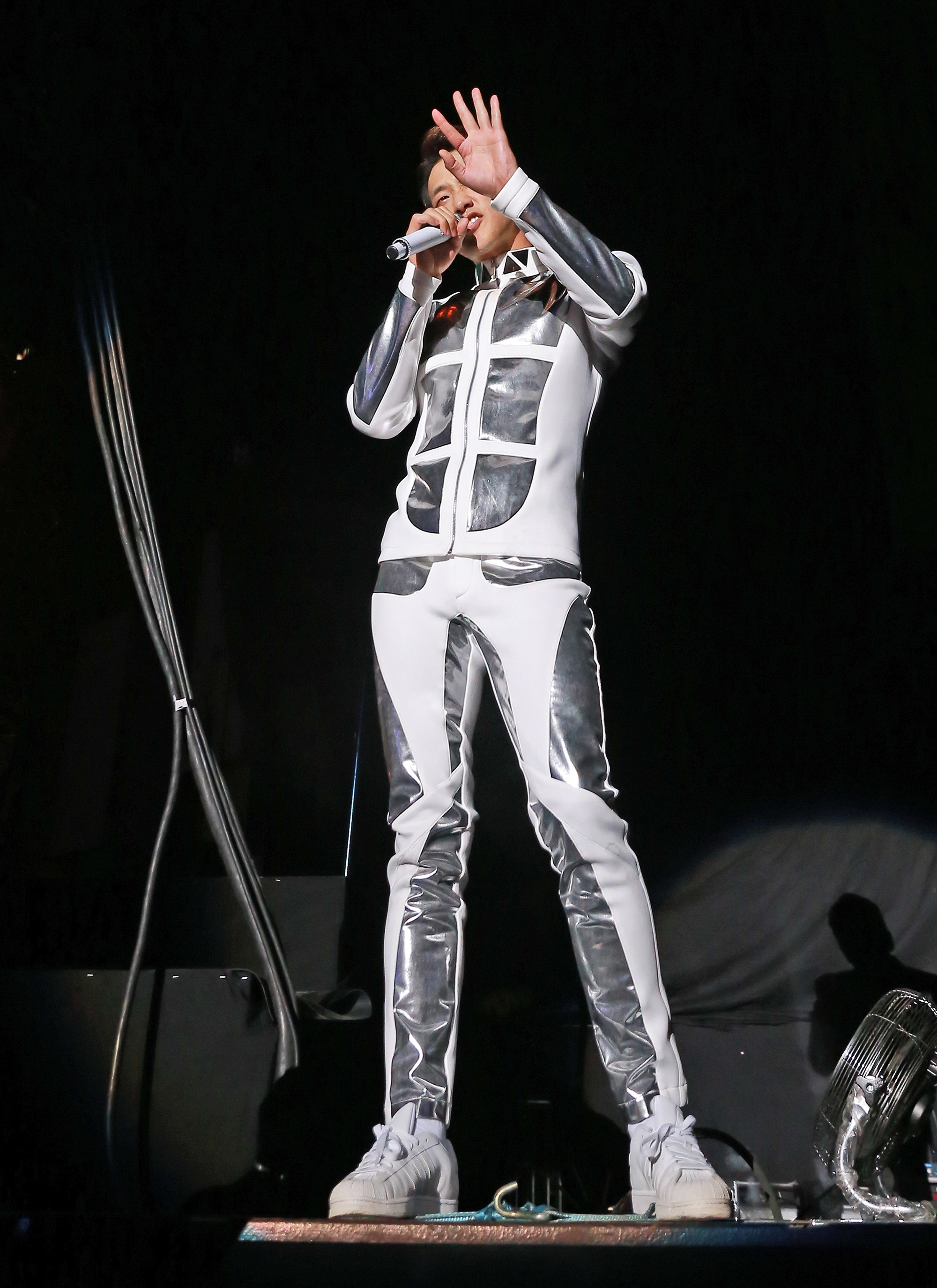
Rain performing on the tour in Shenzhen

List of tour dates
Date	City	Country	Venue	Attendance
November 7, 2015	Changsha	China	Hunan International Conference & Exhibition Center	8,000
November 14, 2015	Shenzhen	China	Shenzhen Bay Sports Center	—
December 11, 2015	Seoul	South Korea	SK Olympic Handball Gymnasium	15,000
December 12, 2015	Seoul	South Korea	SK Olympic Handball Gymnasium	15,000
December 13, 2015	Seoul	South Korea	SK Olympic Handball Gymnasium	15,000
December 19, 2015	Guangzhou	China	Guangzhou International Sports Arena	—
December 26, 2015	Shanghai	China	Shanghai Indoor Stadium	8,000
January 9, 2016	Wuhan	China	Wuhan Culture and Expo Center	—
January 23, 2016	Shenyang	China	Liaoning Gymnasium	10,000
January 30, 2016	Hong Kong	China	AsiaWorld–Arena	—
January 31, 2016	Hong Kong	China	AsiaWorld–Arena	—
March 5, 2016	Hangzhou	China	Yellow Dragon Sports Center	—
April 23, 2016	Chengdu	China	Sichuan Gymnasium	—
May 21, 2016	Genting Highlands	Malaysia	Arena of Stars	5,000
May 24, 2016	Tokyo	Japan	Tokyo International Forum	—
May 25, 2016	Tokyo	Japan	Tokyo International Forum	—
June 4, 2016	Macau	China	Cotai Arena	—
June 18, 2016	Beijing	China	LeTV Sports Ecological Center	5,000
December 30, 2016	Singapore		Resorts World Convention Centre	4,000
Total				N/A

== Still Raining Tour ==
Rain announced that he would be holding a tour titled the Still Raining Tour in September 2023. Two concerts in the United States were announced in Atlantic City and Las Vegas, marking the first time he performed in the country since the Legend of Rainism Tour in 2009.

List of tour dates
Date	City	Country	Venue	Attendance
November 22, 2023	Atlantic City	United States	Hard Rock Live at Etess Arena	—
November 25, 2023	Las Vegas	United States	MGM Grand Garden Arena	—
June 8, 2024	Seoul	South Korea	Olympic Hall	—
June 9, 2024	Seoul	South Korea	Olympic Hall	—
July 13, 2024	Hong Kong	China	AsiaWorld–Expo Hall 5	—
February 15, 2025	Kaohsiung	Taiwan	Kaohsiung Music Center	—
November 23, 2025	New York City	United States	Barclays Center	—
November 26, 2025	San Bernardino (Note: Labelled as Los Angeles in promotional materials)	United States	Yaamava' Theater	—
November 29, 2025	Atlanta	United States	Coca-Cola Roxy	—
January 17, 2026	Taipei	Taiwan	Taipei Arena	10,000
Total				N/A
