= Pieces by Rain =

EP by Rain
- Released: March 3, 2021
- Genre: K-pop
- Length: 16:28
- Language: Korean
- Label: RAIN Company; Sublime Artist Agency; Kakao M
- Producer: Rain

Rain chronology
My Life (2017)	Pieces by Rain (2021)

Singles from Pieces by Rain
- 1. "Switch to Me" Released: December 31, 2020; 2. "Why Don't We" Released: March 3, 2021

Pieces by Rain is the third Korean-language extended play by South Korean singer Rain. It was released on March 3, 2021, by RAIN Company, Sublime Artist Agency and distributed by Kakao M. It is his first EP in three years, since My Life in 2017, and his first musical release since the single "Switch to Me" in January 2021.

The album contains a total of five tracks, including the lead single "Why Don't We", which features Chungha and the pre-release track "Switch to Me" with his mentor and former CEO J.Y. Park.

== Background ==
The project marks Rain's first release in three years. He reunited with his mentor Park Jin-young to release the collaboration song "Switch to Me" on December 31, 2020. Rain also featured Chungha on his song "Why Don't We", which served as the lead single from Pieces by Rain. On March 3, 2021, Rain released the EP, which includes five songs, including "Switch to Me" and "Why Don't We".

== Track listing ==
Pieces by Rain track listing
No.	Title	Lyrics	Music	Length
1.	"Aurora" (오로라)	Jung Ji Hoon	TM; Lee Hyeon Seung	3:57
2.	"Magnetic" (featuring Jackson Wang)	Oneway; Boytoy; Jackson Wang	Jackson Wang	2:39
3.	"Why Don't We" (featuring Chungha)	Sik-K	Sik-K; Shannon; Elum (Prismfilter); Nmore; Anchor; Bumzu	2:58
4.	"Come Over" (이리루와 (featuring Keita, Tag, and Won of Ciipher))	Wolf; Tag; Won; Keita	Wolf; Tag	3:37
5.	"Switch to Me" (나로 바꾸자 (duet with J.Y. Park))	J.Y. Park	J.Y. Park	3:17
Total length:				16:28

== Charts ==
Chart performance for Pieces by Rain
Chart (2021)	Peak position
South Korean Albums (Gaon)	23

== Accolades ==
Music program awards
Song	Program	Date	Ref.
"Switch to Me"	M Countdown (Mnet)	January 14, 2021	

== Release history ==
Release history and formats for Pieces by Rain
Country	Date	Format	Label
South Korea	March 3, 2021	CD, digital download, streaming	RAIN Company, Genie Music
Various	March 3, 2021	CD, digital download, streaming	RAIN Company, Genie Music
