= Uhm Bok-dong =

South Korean cyclist

- Born: June 20, 1892; Hanseong, Joseon (Modern day Seoul, South Korea)
- Died: July 20, 1951 (aged 59); Gyeonggi, South Korea
- Occupation: Cyclist
- Years active: 1910–1951

Korean name
- Hangul: 엄복동
- RR: Eom Bokdong
- MR: Ŏm Poktong

Uhm Bok-dong (Korean: 엄복동; June 20, 1892 – 1951?) was a Korean cyclist active during the Japanese colonial period.

== Biography ==
Uhm was born on June 20, 1892, in Hanseong, Joseon.

== Legacy ==
The Korea Cycling Federation held the National Cycle Competition, in memory of Uhm, from 1977 to 1999.

The Cultural Heritage Administration of Korea designated Uhm's bicycle as a heritage of modern Korean history.

== Popular culture ==
- Race to Freedom: Um Bok Dong
