= Rain's Coming World Tour =

2006–2007 concert tour by Rain

- Tour by Rain
- Location: Asia; North America; Australia
- Associated album: Rain's World
- Start date: October 13, 2006
- End date: October 27, 2007
- No. of shows: 18

Rain concert chronology
- Rainy Day Tour (2005–06); Rain's Coming World Tour (2006–07); The Legend of Rainism Tour (2009–10)

The Rain's Coming World Tour is first worldwide concert tour (second overall) by South Korean singer Rain. It saw 17 shows in Asia, North America and Australia from December 2006 to October 2007 in support of his fourth Korean studio album Rain's World (2006). A free promotional concert was held at the Seoul Olympic Stadium one day prior to the album's release.

== History ==
The Rain's Coming World Tour began on December 15, 2006, at Seoul Olympic Stadium in Seoul and was scheduled to continue through 2007 to the following countries: Singapore, Malaysia, Thailand, Vietnam, China, Japan, Taiwan, Australia, United States, and Canada. His tour incorporated the talents of producers and stage designers (such as Jamie King and Roy Bennett) who have been involved with the concert tours of other artists such as U2, Michael Jackson, Ricky Martin, Madonna, Britney Spears, and The Rolling Stones.

His concert at the Tokyo Dome on May 25, 2007, attracted nearly 40,000 people. Rain was the first Korean artist to perform at the Tokyo Dome.

== Legal issues ==
His scheduled concerts in Shanghai, Toronto, San Francisco, Atlanta, San Jose and Hawaii during the tour were canceled, followed by the last concert in Los Angeles. The last event at the Staples Center was canceled only two hours prior to opening: Rain's producer blamed the situation on financial problems of the local promoter, while the local promoter blamed Wellmade STAR M calling them too "incompetent to handle the situation."

On March 19, 2009, a federal jury in Honolulu found that Rain, his former management agency JYP Entertainment, and two other promotion companies were guilty of breaching a contract and defrauding Honolulu promoter Click Entertainment for $2 million (originally just over $1 million) after the Hawaii concert was canceled and the promoters were not refunded the $500,000 licensing fee. Rain and JYP were ordered to pay $2.4 million each in punitive damages, $1 million for damages related to the fraud, and $2.3 million for breach of contract.

A separate lawsuit filed by promoters Wellmade STAR M was dismissed by a South Korean court on January 28, 2010. Judge Bae Kwang-Kuk ruled in favor of Rain and blamed the plaintiff for poor preparations surrounding the cancelled U.S. tour.

== Shows ==
Tour dates
Date	City	Country	Venue	Attendance
October 13, 2006	Seoul	South Korea	Seoul Olympic Stadium (Note: Free concert)	40,000
December 15, 2006	Seoul	South Korea	Olympic Gymnastics Arena	20,000
December 16, 2006	Seoul	South Korea	Olympic Gymnastics Arena	20,000
December 23, 2006	Las Vegas	United States	The Colosseum at Caesars Palace	7,600
December 24, 2006	Las Vegas	United States	The Colosseum at Caesars Palace	7,600
January 12, 2007	Hong Kong	China	AsiaWorld–Arena	24,000
January 13, 2007	Hong Kong	China	AsiaWorld–Arena	24,000
January 21, 2007	Singapore		Singapore Indoor Stadium	10,000
January 27, 2007	Kuala Lumpur	Malaysia	Putra Indoor Stadium	12,000
March 10, 2007	Ho Chi Minh City	Vietnam	Quân khu 7 Stadium	40,000
March 11, 2007	Ho Chi Minh City	Vietnam	Quân khu 7 Stadium	40,000
March 30, 2007	Taipei	Taiwan	Taoyuan Arena	10,000
April 14, 2007	Sydney	Australia	Acer Arena	8,000
May 25, 2007	Tokyo	Japan	Tokyo Dome	40,000
June 2, 2007	Bangkok	Thailand	Impact Arena	30,000
June 3, 2007	Bangkok	Thailand	Impact Arena	30,000
October 6, 2007	Shanghai	China	Hongkou Football Stadium	15,000
October 27, 2007	Daegu	South Korea	Daegu World Cup Stadium	25,000
Total				281,600

=== Cancelled shows ===
Date	City	Country	Venue	Reason
June 15, 2007	Honolulu	United States	Aloha Stadium	Promoter issues
June 19, 2007	Atlanta	United States	Philips Arena	Promoter issues
June 23, 2007	New York City	United States	Madison Square Garden	Promoter issues
June 27, 2007	San Francisco	United States	Cow Palace	Promoter issues
June 30, 2007	Los Angeles	United States	Staples Center	Promoter issues
