= Rain's World =

Studio album by Rain
- Released: October 14, 2006
- Recorded: 2004–2006
- Studio: JYPE Studio (Seoul)
- Genres: K-pop; R&B; hip hop
- Length: 48:43
- Language: Korean
- Labels: JYP; Warner Music Asia
- Producers: Park Jin-young; Tae Kwon "Soul Attack"; Bang Si-hyuk; Wonderkid; Choi Jung-min; Seo Eui-beom "Crazy Bomb"

Rain chronology
Eternal Rain (2006)	Rain's World (2006)	Rainism (2008)

Singles from Rain's World
- 1. "I'm Coming" Released: October 14, 2006; 2. "In My Bed" Released: October 14, 2006; 3. "With U" Released: October 14, 2006

Rain's World is the fourth Korean-language studio album by South Korean recording artist Rain. It was released on October 14, 2006, through JYP Entertainment. Building on the success of its predecessor, the album further established him as one of the top musical acts in Southeast Asia. A repackaged edition of the album was released on December 22, 2006.

Commercially, the album peaked at number one on the Korean monthly album chart issue for October 2006, becoming Rain's first monthly number-one album. It was the ninth best-selling album of the year in South Korea, selling over 106,000 copies. In 2007, it was named one of the Best Japanese & Korean Releases at the IFPI Hong Kong Sales Awards.

== Background and release ==
Rain's World was released through JYP Entertainment and Warner Music Asia on October 14, 2006. Three singles were promoted for the album: "I'm Coming" (featuring Tablo), "In My Bed", and "With U". Media outlets noted that the single "I'm Coming" "was created after hundreds of revisions over two years".

A repackage of the album was released in two versions: A type (CD+DVD Set) and B Type (CD+DVD+Diary Set). CD contains remixed 'Bad Guy', 'I'm Coming', 'I' And 'With U' added to films of 4th album recording, jacket picture shooting session, a music video taping. B Type re-pack, which was limited to 5,000 copies, was a seasonal item for the Fall of the year with a high quality diary that has Rain's pictures undisclosed to the public.

== Reception ==
Commercially, the album debuted at number one on the MIAK monthly album chart in October 2006, his first number-one album on the chart. It sold 108,179 copies in South Korea by January 2007. In Taiwan, the album peaked at number seven on the G-Music Combo Albums chart and number one on the East Asian Albums chart. Although Rain did not win any music program awards in South Korea while promoting the album, he won Best Male Artist at the 2006 Mnet KM Music Festival for "I'm Coming" and Best Japanese & Korean Release at the IFPI Hong Kong Sales Awards in 2007.

=== Accolades ===
Awards and nominations for Rain's World
Year	Organization	Award	Result	Ref.
2006	Mnet KM Music Festival	Album of the Year (Daesang)	Nominated	
2007	IFPI Hong Kong Sales Awards	Best Japanese & Korean Releases	Won	

== Promotion and live performances ==
To promote the release, Rain embarked on the Rain's Coming World Tour. The tour started in Seoul and included stops in the US, Japan, China, Singapore, and more. The opening show of the tour was a free concert held the day prior to the release of Rain's World at the Seoul Olympic Stadium, which attracting 40,000 people. His concert at the Tokyo Dome on May 25, 2007, attracted nearly 40,000 people and marked the first time a Korean artist performed at the Tokyo Dome. The tour attracted over 280,000 people in total.

On November 27, 2010, Rain performed "Friends" and two other songs at the 2010 Asian Games closing ceremony in Guangzhou, China.

== Track listing ==
Rain's World – Standard edition
No.	Title	Length
1.	"Rain's World"	0:54
2.	"I'm Coming" (featuring Tablo)	3:43
3.	"With U"	3:20
4.	"In My Bed" (내가 누웠던 침대)	4:11
5.	"Not A Single Day" (하루도)	4:12
6.	"Cassiopeia" (카시오페아; featuring Lim Jeong-hee)	4:29
7.	"Him & Me" (featuring Dynamic Duo)	4:06
8.	"Don't Stop"	3:48
9.	"Touch Ya" (featuring C-Luv)	3:38
10.	"Move On"	4:17
11.	"Oh Yeah" (featuring Ai)	3:35
12.	"Friends" (featuring Tiger JK)	3:56
13.	"To My Friends"	1:43
14.	"Me" (나; B-Garage Remix)	2:57
Total length:		48:43

Rain's World – Repackage
No.	Title	Length
15.	"Bad Guy" (나쁜 남자; Tango Version)	3:13
16.	"I'm Coming" (featuring Tablo; Home-Grown Remix)	4:39
17.	"I" (난; Acoustic Live Version)	3:31
18.	"With You" (Hybrid Beat Remix)	3:49
Total length:		1:03:15

Rain's World – Repackage DVD
No.	Title	Length
1.	"Making of "I'm Coming" and "In My Bed""	30:15
2.	"I'm Coming" (video)	6:09
3.	"In My Bed" (video)	5:06
Total length:		41:30

== Charts ==
=== Weekly charts ===
Chart (2006)	Peak position
Japanese Albums (Oricon)	57
Taiwanese Albums (G-Music)	7
Taiwanese J-pop Albums (G-Music)	1

=== Monthly charts ===
Chart (2006)	Peak position
South Korean Albums (RIAK)	1

=== Year-end charts ===
Chart (2006)	Position
South Korean Albums (RIAK)	9

== Sales ==
Region	Certification	Certified units/sales
South Korea	—	121,357
