= Rain (entertainer) =

South Korean singer and actor (born 1982)

- 비
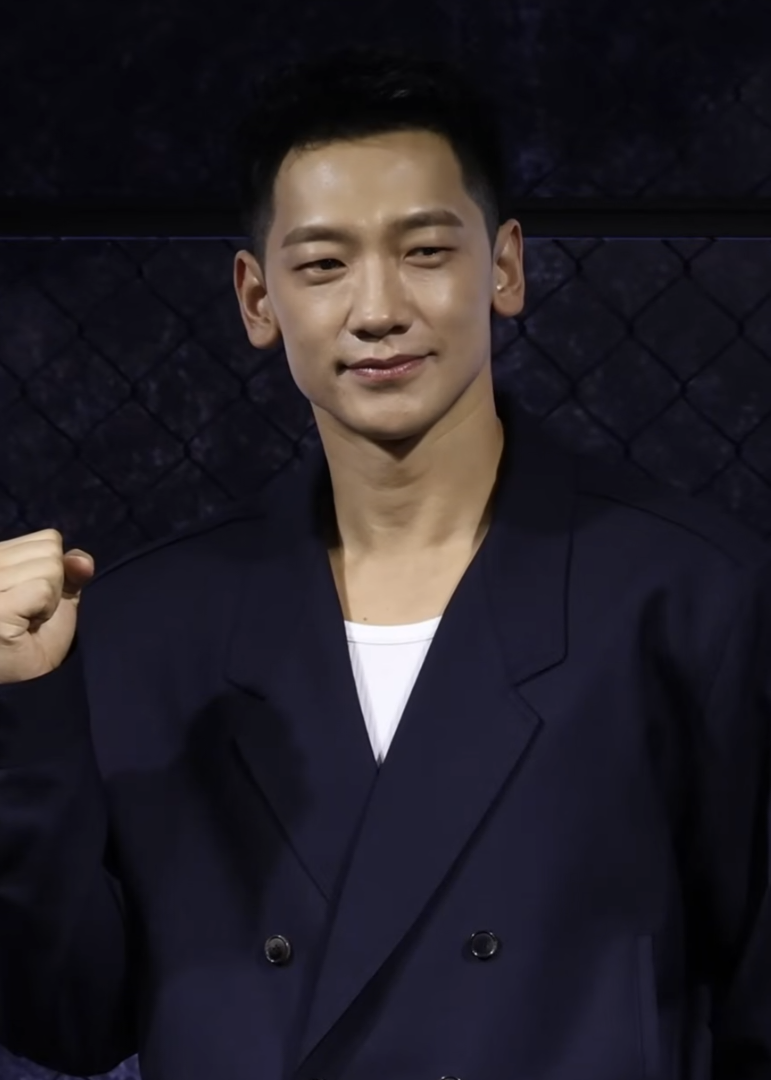
- Rain in March 2026
- Born: Jung Ji-hoon; June 25, 1982 (age 44); Seosan, South Korea
- Other names: Bi Rain; B.Ryong
- Occupations: Singer; songwriter; dancer; record producer; actor
- Years active: 1998–2000; 2002–present
- Organization: R.A.I.N. Company
- Spouse: Kim Tae-hee (m. 2017)
- Children: 2
- Musical career
- Also known as: Bi
- Genres: K-pop; R&B
- Instruments: Vocals; piano; guitar
- Labels: JYP; J. Tune; WME; Cube; R.A.I.N. Company
- Formerly of: FanClub; JYP Nation; SSAK3
- Website: raincompany.co.kr (Korean)

Korean name
- Hangul: 정지훈
- Hanja: 鄭智薰
- RR: Jeong Jihun
- MR: Chŏng Chihun

Stage name
- Hangul: 비
- RR: Bi
- MR: Pi

Signature
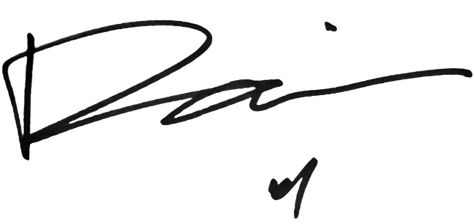

Jung Ji-hoon (Korean: 정지훈; born June 25, 1982), known professionally as Rain and Bi (비; ['piː]), is a South Korean singer, songwriter, dancer, actor, and record producer. Rain's musical career includes seven albums (six Korean, one Japanese), 28 singles and numerous concert tours around the world. He achieved breakthrough success with his third Korean album, It's Raining (2004), which spawned the number one single of the same name. The album sold over 200,000 copies in South Korea and one million copies throughout Asia, and established Rain as an international star.

Rain made his acting debut in the 2003 drama Sang Doo! Let's Go To School. His lead role in the pan-Asia hit drama Full House (2004) established his status as a Hallyu star. In 2008, Rain made his Hollywood debut in the film Speed Racer and starred in Ninja Assassin (2009), the latter of which made him the first Korean to win a MTV Movie Award. Rain has set up his own company twice, the first being J. Tune Entertainment in 2007, and R.A.I.N. Company in 2015.

Rain has received numerous accolades for his work in both music and acting, including six Mnet Asian Music Awards, three Golden Disc Awards, nine KBS Drama Awards and two Baeksang Arts Awards. In 2008, he was ranked third among 100 leaders of the Korean entertainment industry by Sports Dong-a, and was named one of Time's 100 most influential people in the world in 2006 and 2011.

== Early life ==
Rain was born as Jung Ji-hoon on June 25, 1982, in Seosan, South Korea. His mother died in December 2000 as she struggled with diabetes. In the same year, Rain was recruited as a trainee for JYP Entertainment, led by recording artist and producer Park Jin-young. In a CNN interview and also in a Discovery Channel documentary called Discovering Hip Korea, he recalled being repeatedly rejected because of his looks: "In fact, I was told after one audition that my singing and dancing was great but I did not make it because I did not have double eyelids." He was eventually recruited into JYP Entertainment, as Park Jin-young saw his drive and persistence. During his early years of training, Rain was a backup dancer.

== Music career ==
=== 1998–2006: Debut, Bad Guy, How to Avoid the Sun and Pan-Asia success ===
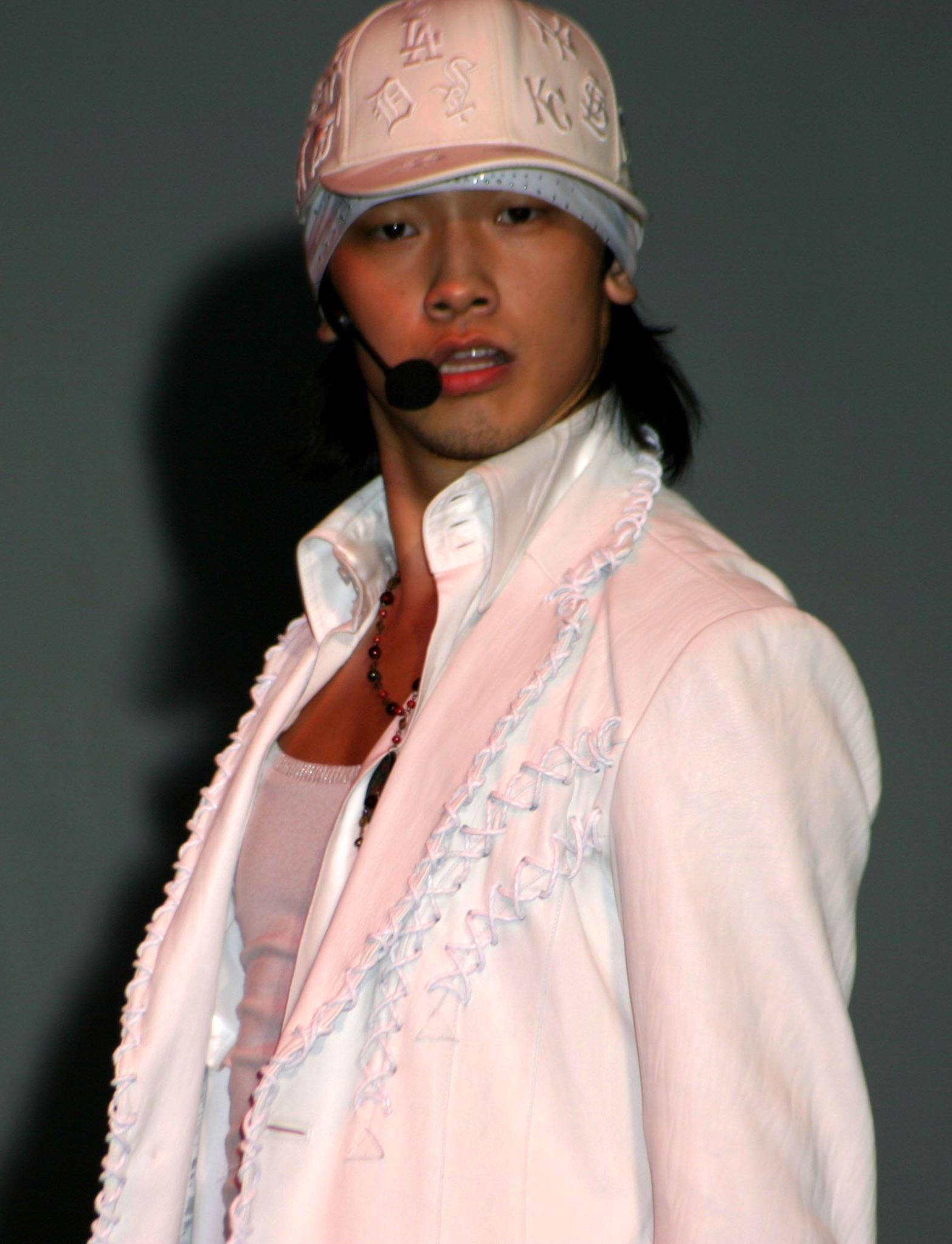
Rain during a performance in 2005.

Rain, aged 16, debuted as a member of a boy band named Fanclub (팬클럽). Despite releasing two albums, the group failed to be commercially successful. On May 13, 2002, Jung debuted as a solo singer with his first solo album titled Bad Guy where he was introduced to the media through his stage name, Rain. Two singles were released from the album—the eponymous title track "Bad Guy" and "Handshake". Following the success of his debut, Rain released his second album, How to Avoid the Sun (Note: How to Avoid the Sun may be alternately referred to as How to Run From the Sun or simply Rain 2) on October 16, 2003, with the lead single "How to Avoid the Sun", again to commercial success. From 2002 to 2003, he became a host for KBS's Music Bank.

Rain then released his third album, It's Raining on October 8, 2004, which further consolidated his popularity throughout East and Southeast Asia. To promote the release, Rain embarked on his first tour, Rainy Day Tour, which spanned a total of 14 concerts in 8 countries. The album went on to sell over a million copies in Asia, cementing Rain's position as one of the region's top musical acts. According to JYP Entertainment, Rain earned US$35 million in revenue from promotional activities and endorsements throughout 2005.

=== 2006–2007: Expansion outside Korea, Eternal Rain and Rain's Coming ===
As part of his Rainy Day Tour, Rain held a two-day concert at The Theater at Madison Square Garden in New York City in February 2006. It was the largest concert by a Korean artist in the city at the time, attracting over 10,000 people, and was sold out within a matter of days. The concert featured appearances from Park Ji-yoon, as well as JoJo, P. Diddy and Omarion and was promoted by the Asian concert production company Rainstone Live. In April 2006, Rain was included in Time magazine's list of "100 Most Influential People in the World". Rain released his debut Japanese album, Eternal Rain on September 13, 2006, which peaked at number 14 on the Oricon Albums Chart.

After his Japanese promotions, Rain followed up with the release of his fourth album, Rain's World on October 14, 2006. It was the 9th best-selling album of the year in South Korea, and a repackage of the album was released 2 months later. In support of the record, Rain held a free promotional concert at the Seoul World Cup Stadium one day prior to the album's release in front of 40,000 fans. He subsequently held his second concert tour titled the Rain's Coming World Tour, which began on December 15, 2006, at the Olympic Gymnastics Arena in Seoul. It continued through 2007 to various parts of Asia, Australia, United States, and Canada and was well received. Rain performed two concert dates in Las Vegas, Nevada, from December 23 to 24, 2006, held at The Colosseum at Caesars Palace for a total of 7,600 fans.

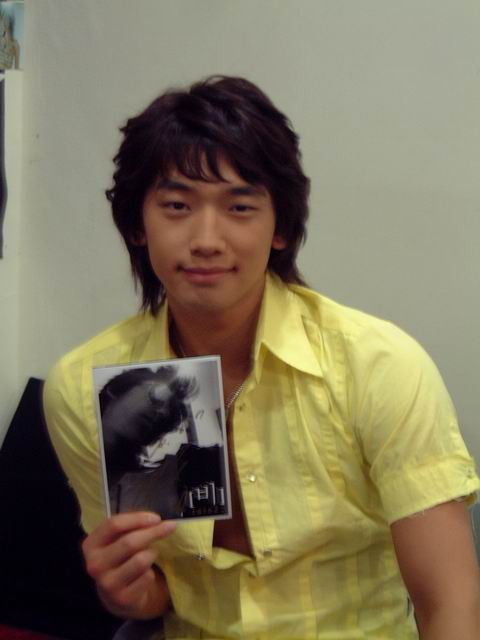
Rain in Bangkok 2007

In April 2007, Rain topped Time Magazine's online user poll, defeating Stephen Colbert by 100,000 votes; Colbert jokingly retaliated by producing a parody of Rain's music video for "How to Avoid the Sun" called "He's Singin' In Korean", and challenged Rain to a dance-off or a "cuddle-off", or a "spoon-off". He also made it into People's 2007 list of the "Most Beautiful People" in the world. In a press release, Rain stated that he was honored to be on the list, and also noted that it will be a great boost to his efforts to raise his public awareness in the United States. On May 25, 2007, Rain became the first Korean artist to hold a concert at the Tokyo Dome, which attracted nearly 40,000 attendees. Later that year, Rain left JYP Entertainment to start his own company, J. Tune Entertainment, but still retains his collaborative relationship with Park Jin-young. On May 5, 2008, Rain appeared in a surprise guest segment at the end of The Colbert Report, and proceeded to engage Colbert in a dance-off on a Dance Dance Revolution machine.

=== 2008–2012: Olympics, Rainism, Back to the Basic and continued popularity ===
In January 2008, Rain was tapped to sing the theme song of the 2008 Beijing Olympic Games, "Hand in Hand". He also performed at the Beijing Olympic closing ceremony in August, singing the closing theme song "Beijing, Beijing, I Love Beijing". On October 15, 2008, Rain released his fifth Korean album, Rainism, which spawned the number one hit single "Love Story". The music video for "Love Story" featured Korean actress Ha Ji-won. A second single, titled "Rainism", was subsequently released. Rain held a comeback showcase for the album, and appeared in a two-day special program where exclusive footage and interviews of the singer was shown.

On November 24, 2008, the Commission of Youth Protection deemed the album inappropriate for people under 19 years old because the lyrics in the song "Rainism" were considered problematic due to their phallic and sexual references. Rain re-released a "clean version" of "Rainism" shortly after, but instead of changing the original album's contents, a sticker was placed on the album that prohibited its sale to those under 19 years old.

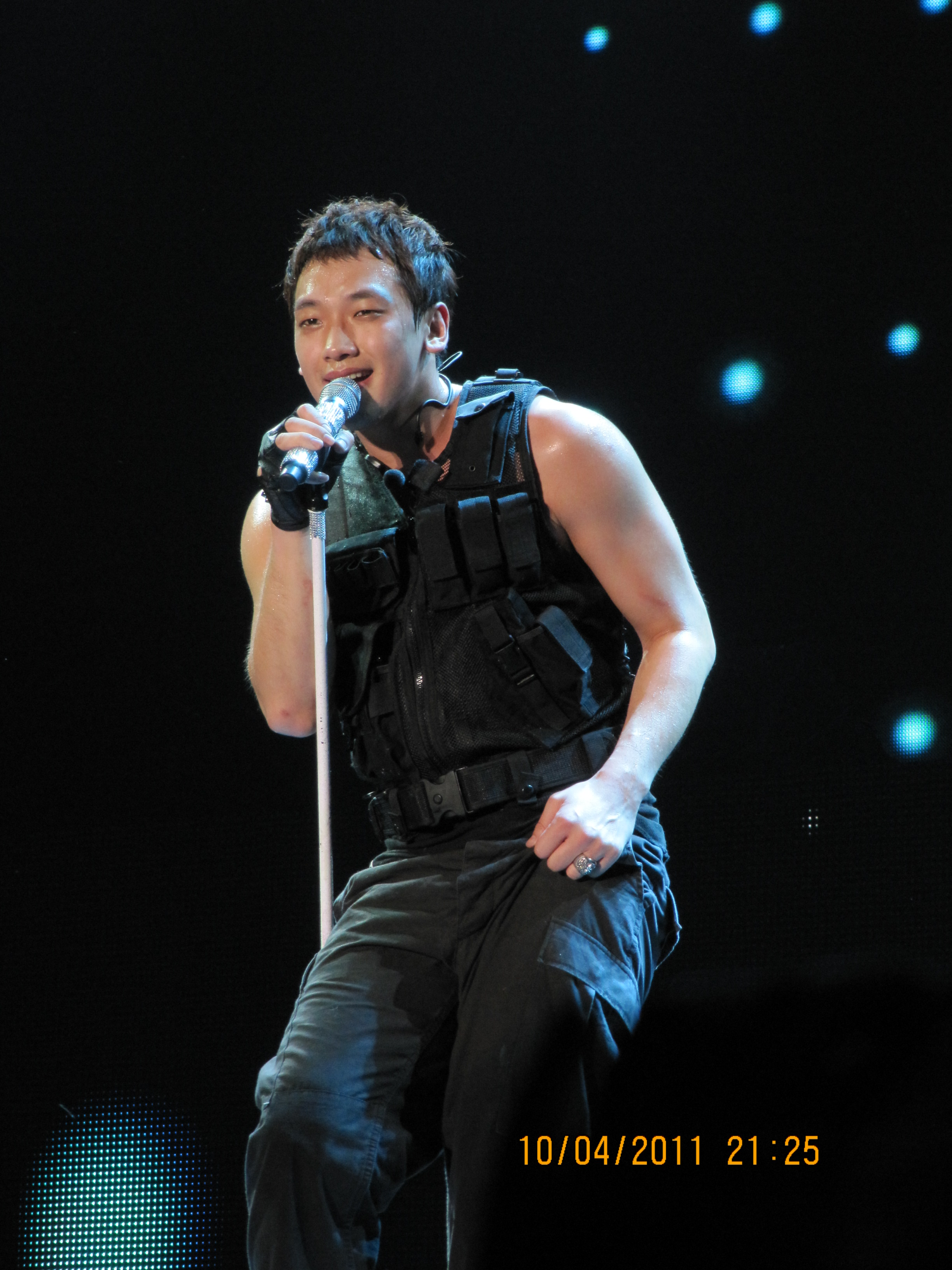
Rain at Sepang International Circuit F1 2011 post-party concert, Malaysia

In October 2009, in support of his fifth album Rainism, Rain kicked off his third concert tour, The Legend of Rainism Tour with two shows at Olympic Gymnastics Arena in Seoul on October 9 and 10. It continued with concerts in various parts of Asia and at The Colosseum at Caesars Palace in Las Vegas, Nevada, from December 24 to 25, 2009. On April 6, 2010, Rain released a special mini-album titled Back to the Basic, including the singles "Love Song" starring Han Ye-seul in the music video as well as "Hip Song". Once again, Rain topped the Time 100 reader's poll. In October, Rain represented Korea and performed at the 7th Asia Song Festival, organised by Korea Foundation for International Culture Exchange, at the Seoul Olympic Stadium.

In 2011, Rain made his third appearance at the top of the Time 100 poll and the second time as a finalist. Time describes his win as "The South Korean pop star turned actor Rain, 28, took the top spot in the Time 100 reader poll for the third year, trouncing competitors from Barack Obama to Lady Gaga. That's pretty impressive online power for a guy whose main claim to Western fame is a role in the 2009 film Ninja Assassin." Along with the Time honor, Rain went on a farewell tour, The Best Show Tour, before his 21-month compulsory military service. The tour spanned Southeast Asia including his first tour dates throughout South Korea. His last concert, Rain: Last of The Best was deemed as the best event in Gangnam District for 2011.

=== 2013–2019: Cube Entertainment, Rain Effect, The Squall tour and My Life ===
On September 17, 2013, it was officially announced that Rain signed with Cube DC, a sub-label of Cube Entertainment. After signing with Cube DC, it was announced Rain would be going on his first tour since his discharge. The 2013 Zepp Tour: Story of Rain saw Rain perform 10 dates in four cities in Japan over a few dates in November. In October, Rain held his first fan meeting since his discharge in Seoul.

As a precursor to his new album, Rain starred in a reality show Rain Effect, which premiered on December 19, 2013. The new album, titled Rain Effect, was released on January 2, 2014, with music videos for double title tracks, "30 Sexy" and "La Song". A few months later, Rain released a repackaged version of the album, featuring the ballad single "I Love You". On September 7, 2015, Rain announced through his Facebook page that he and the CEO had come to a mutual decision to not renew his contract with Cube Entertainment. On October 11, he announced through his official website that he had created his own one-man agency with the aid of his longtime manager and other entertainment figures.

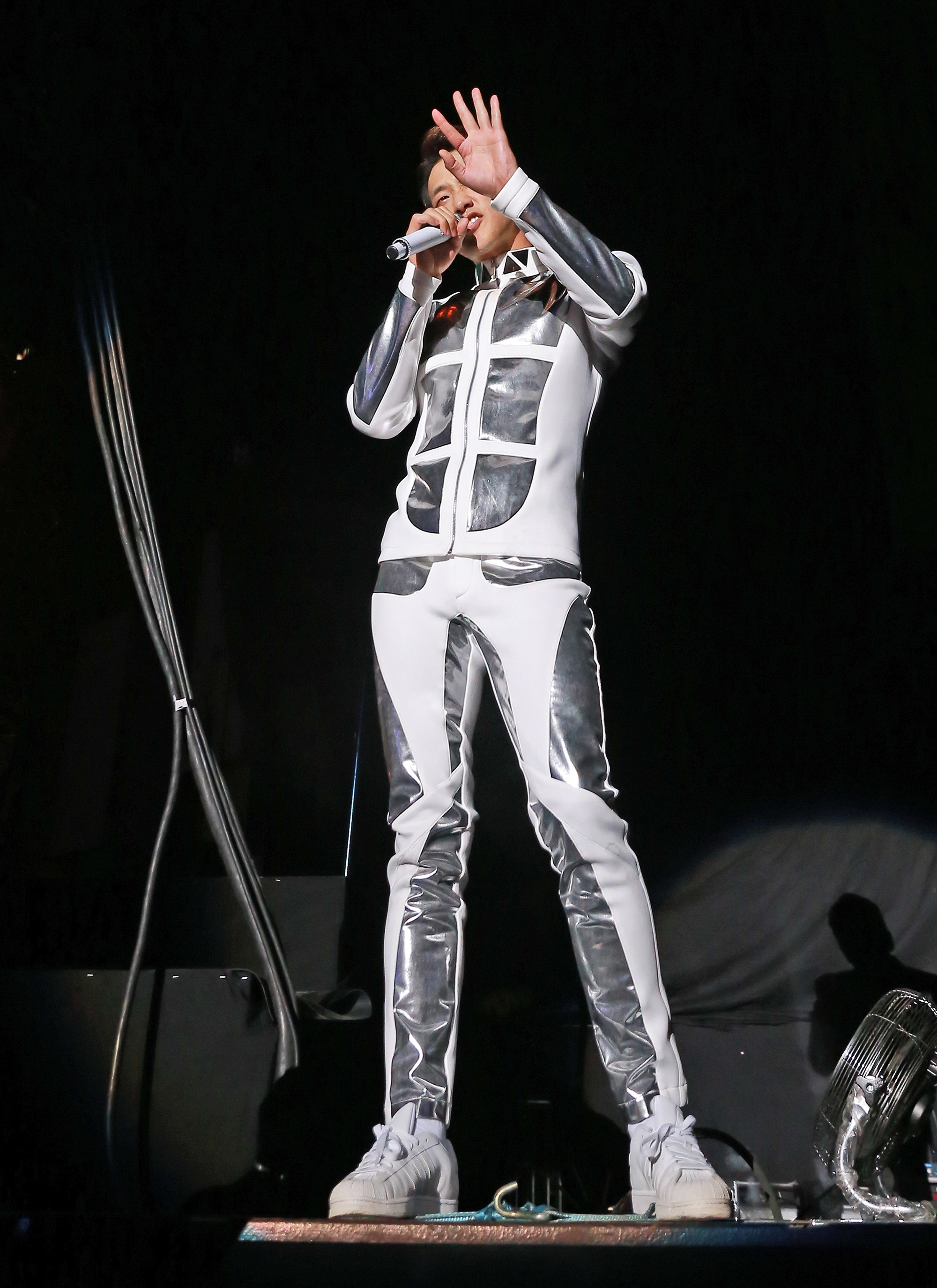
Rain performing during The Squall World Tour in Shenzhen, 2015

From late 2015 to 2016, Rain embarked on his second world tour, titled The Squall World Tour. On December 12, 2016, R.A.I.N. Company announced that Rain would release a new album in 2017 with a series of promotional activities to accompany his musical comeback. He released the single "The Best Present", produced by Psy on January 14, 2017. In October 2017, Rain appeared as a mentor on KBS' survival audition program, The Unit. On November 7, it was announced that Rain would come back with a new mini album in December with a comeback special titled 2017 Rain is Back airing December 3 on KBS. The comeback special was followed by a series of variety and music show promotional activities. Rain's album, My Life was released on December 1, 2017.

=== 2020–present: Career resurgence and SSAK3 ===
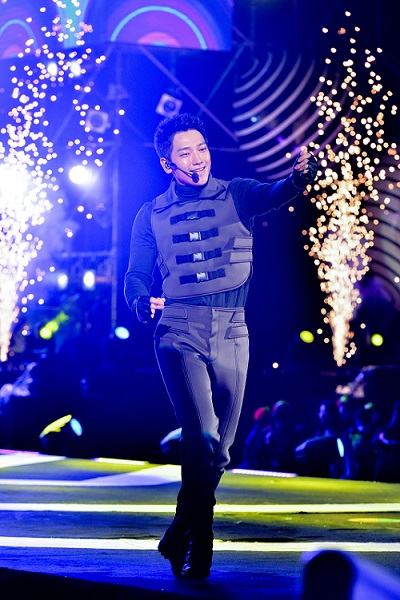
Rain performing at the 2018 Taipei New Year's Eve party

In mid-May 2020, Rain's 2017 music video and song "Gang" from his second EP My Life went viral on YouTube in South Korea for its overly bombastic production, choreography and mannerisms, and self-absorbed lyrics after a parody dance video "1 Gang a Day" by a high school student released in late 2019 became a sensation online. Rain embraced his newfound fame with grace and self-deprecation, inviting more interest towards the song and invoking more parody videos. The phenomenon ― consuming, leaving comments, producing parodies ― blew up further after Rain's appearance on MBC's television program Hangout with Yoo. An official remix version of "Gang" by Sik-K, PH-1, Jay Park, and Haon was released on June 4, 2020, and topped all real-time charts upon its release.

Rain joined Mnet's survival reality show I-Land, which premiered on June 26, 2020, as a judge and mentor. Rain also featured in Zico's song "Summer Hate" from his third EP Random Box, which was released on July 1, 2020. In the summer of 2020, through Hangout with Yoo, Rain, under the stage name B.Ryong, collaborated with Yoo Jae-suk and Lee Hyori to form a summer project co-ed trio SSAK3. The group's song "Beach Again", released on July 18, 2020, topped various music charts upon release and topped the Gaon Digital Chart for five consecutive weeks. SSAK3 also released "Play That Summer" as well as solo songs, including Rain's "Exciting" featuring Mamamoo, on July 25 as part of the group's project. In December 2020, Rain was recognized as one of the ten "2020 Visionary" figures, selected by CJ E&M, who inspired the global public with their pioneering work in Korean pop culture in 2020.

Rain is set to release a new album after three years. He reunited with his mentor Park Jin-young to release the collaboration song "Switch To Me" on December 31, 2020. Rain also featured Chungha and released the song "Why Don't We", which is the title track for his third EP Pieces by Rain. On March 3, 2021, Rain released his new EP, which includes five songs, including "Switch to Me" and "Why Don't We".

== Acting career ==
=== 2003–2006: Acting debut and Hallyu fame ===
Rain made his television debut in the KBS drama, Sang Doo! Let's Go to School (2003). The drama achieved good ratings and he won the Most Popular TV Actor award at the 2004 Baeksang Arts Awards. In 2004, Rain's popularity continued to climb when starred alongside Song Hye-kyo in the hit romantic comedy series Full House, which drew solid viewership ratings nationwide throughout its run with a peak viewer rating of 42.7 percent. The series was broadcast in various parts of Asia as well as the United States, garnering much popularity and establishing Rain as a Hallyu star. His performance in the drama won him the Best Actor award at the KBS Drama Awards. Rain next starred in action romance drama A Love to Kill opposite Shin Min-ah. In 2006, Rain made his big-screen debut in romantic comedy film I'm a Cyborg, But That's OK, directed by Park Chan-wook. The film won the Alfred Bauer Award at the 57th Berlin International Film Festival, and was selected as the opening film for the Hong Kong International Film Festival. Rain was nominated for and won the Best New Actor award at the 43rd Baeksang Arts Awards.

=== 2008–2013: Hollywood ventures ===
In 2008, he starred in his first English-language film, playing Racer Taejo Togokahn in Speed Racer, directed by the Wachowskis. He then made his starring role debut in Ninja Assassin (2009), as the main character Raizo. Ninja Assassin was directed by James McTeigue, and produced by Joel Silver and the Wachowskis. The project was inspired by the ninja scenes featured from Speed Racer, in which Rain had impressed the Wachowskis with his portrayal as a fighter. For his first Hollywood lead role in Ninja Assassin, Rain trained alongside stuntmen for six hours a day, over six months. He won the Biggest Badass award at the 2010 MTV Movie Awards for his performance.

In 2010, Rain returned to the small screen after five years with KBS action drama The Fugitive: Plan B, in which he plays a young, rich and cunning Korean private investigator. This was followed by a leading role in the aviation film R2B: Return to Base, which was released in August 2012. In 2013, it was announced that Rain would appear alongside Bruce Willis, Jason Patric, and John Cusack in the film The Prince. Filming took place in the United States, including in New Orleans. The film premiered in select theaters in 2014, and was also released as video on demand.

=== 2014–present: Success in China and Korean comeback ===
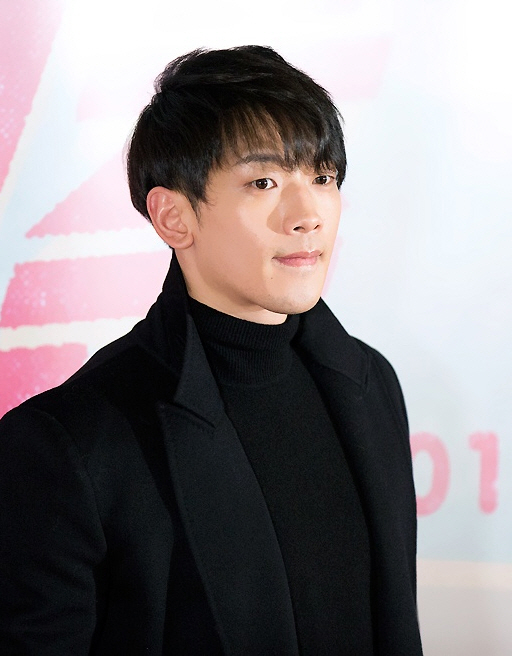
Rain at the premiere for Hot Young Bloods in January 2014

Rain made his small-screen comeback after four years in SBS's musical drama My Lovely Girl (2014), opposite Krystal of f(x).

He also starred in a Chinese romance film, For Love or Money alongside Liu Yifei. The film, which is Rain's Chinese film debut, premiered in November 2014. In December 2014, Rain started filming for his first Chinese drama Diamond Lover, co-starring Tiffany Tang. The drama premiered in July 2015 and achieved huge success, earning high ratings throughout its 24-episode run and reaching 3.3 billion views online. Rain next starred in the SBS drama Come Back Mister, which began airing in February 2016. In May 2016, Rain was cast alongside Victoria Song in the Chinese drama Endless August.

In March 2017, Rain was cast in the movie Uhm Bok-dong based on a true story that took place during the Japanese colonial rule. He starred as the real-life cyclist hero Uhm Bok-dong alongside Kang So-ra. In 2018, Rain was cast in JTBC's action drama Sketch as a detective. In 2019, Rain was cast in MBC drama Welcome 2 Life. In 2022, Rain starred in TVN drama Ghost Doctor, alongside Kim Bum. In April 2026, he starred in the second season of Bloodhounds as the leader of a crime ring.

== Artistry and image ==
=== Music ===
In terms of singing and dancing, Rain has been influenced by Michael Jackson, Usher and Justin Timberlake.

=== Image ===
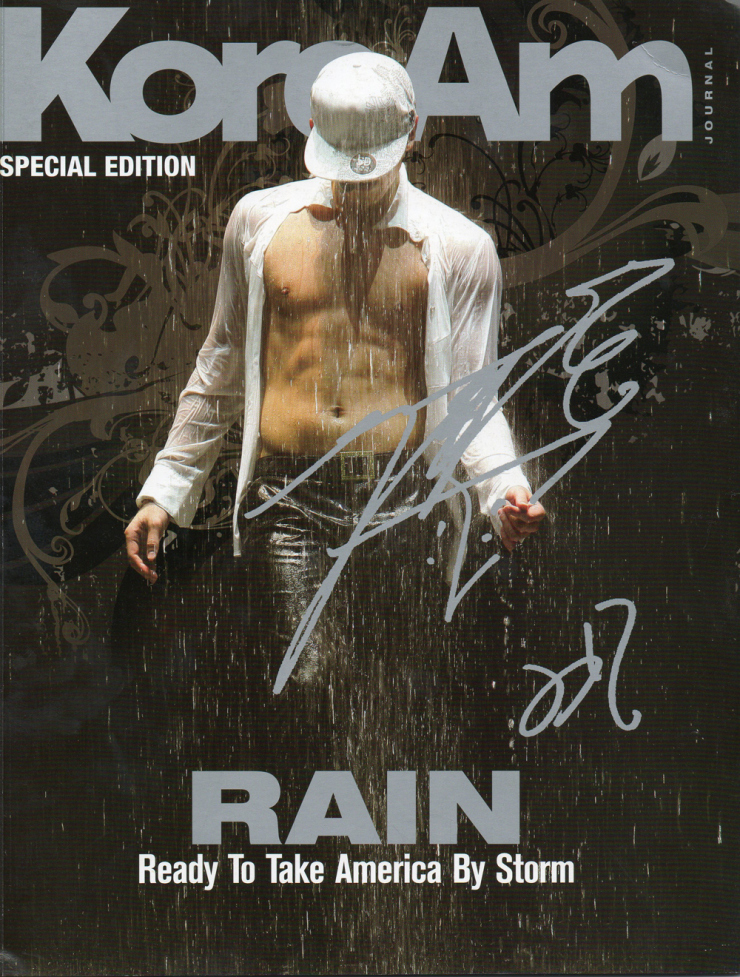
Rain on the cover of KoreAm's June 2007 issue

Rain is considered a "world star" due to his popularity, not only in South Korea and Japan, but throughout Asia, Europe and North America with fans in countries like China, Singapore, Thailand, Canada and United States. Much of his popularity is attributed to his various acting roles (varying from television like Full House to indie films like I'm a Cyborg, But That's OK to blockbusters like Ninja Assassin). Before landing his role in Speed Racer, he had expressed the desire to expand beyond the Asian market when he stated in an interview, "The reason I am active in Japan, Hong Kong, China and around Asia is that I want to succeed here and then go even more international...I would really like to see, is a top Asian artist emerge strongly from the Asian market, and then go on to succeed in the U.S. market." Due to his extreme popularity internationally in the 2000s, he is often credited as the pioneer of the hallyu wave.

Rain's appeal to all demographics has made him one of Korea's highest-paid celebrities by endorsers with an asking price of $1 – US$1.5 million per endorsement. Over the years, he endorsed brands such as Hyundai, Lotte, KB Card, Pizza Hut, Thailand dairy company Dutch Mill, Chinese pastry Fu Mu Cakes, Pantech, LG Electronics, SK Telecom and Pepsi. Rain has even done songs to tie-in with endorsement deals. "Still Believe" was used as both an ad and a music video for BMW Korea's "Meet the Truth" campaign with appearances by Rain as well as JYP. "Memory in My Hand" and "Any Dream" were used in campaigns for Pantech and Samsung, respectively, in China. With his booming popularity throughout the world, he has been deemed a "cultural ambassador" as he has represented South Korea in inter-Asian musical events and has appeared in a Thai published textbook.

== Other activities ==
=== Six to Five ===
Six to Five was Rain's first clothing line, since it also was his dream to become a fashion designer. It was launched on December 23, 2008, and was followed by a "fashion show–launch party–mini-concert" to introduce "Six to Five". He designed and modeled for the clothing. The label "Six To Five" is described by Rain as the idea of having an extra sense (i.e. from five senses to six), and is also said to represent his birth date, 6/25. The line was discontinued and the online mall closed by the end of 2010.

=== J. Tune Entertainment ===
In November 2007, Rain told the Korean media that he had left JYP Entertainment and started his own entertainment company, J. Tune Entertainment (formerly known as Rainy Entertainment). He was scheduled to be CEO of the company, but told the media that he still kept in touch with his mentor and long-time trainer Park Jin Young. J. Tune Entertainment's subsidiary, J. Tune Camp debuted MBLAQ, an all-boy group, in October 2009. Rain actively participates in MBLAQ's music, either composing, writing, producing or choreographing dance routines.

In December 2010, Park Jin-Young announced that J. Tune Entertainment would be merged with JYP Entertainment. It has become the largest shareholder in J. Tune Entertainment, and it is viewed as a strategic alliance between the two companies.

=== R.A.I.N. Company ===
On September 7, 2015, Rain announced through his Facebook page that he had decided to not renew his contract with Cube Entertainment. After much speculation due to his departure from Cube, Rain's official website announced he had created his own one-man agency. In setting up the agency on a U.S.-based system, his Chinese activities will be managed by H Entertainment and Jason Jang while his American agency will still be WME. His music activities will be handled by longtime manager Kim Yong Bae while his acting venture will be handled by Park Jong Sun.

On December 12, 2020, Rain announced that he will debuting a boygroup known as Ciipher in 2021. The group consists of 7 handpicked trainees by Rain himself, most of whom had been previously on survival shows such as YG Treasure Box, No.Mercy, Produce X 101 and Under Nineteen.

=== Humanitarian work ===
From 2005 to 2007, Rain donated money to have 50 drinking water wells and playgrounds built in Cambodia. He began taking up causes related to children by participating in the Love Photography Exhibition to help find adoptive parents for children in government care, donating a percent of his 2006 and 2007 World Tour concert proceeds to children orphaned by AIDS and participating in the Green Ribbon Hope Walking Campaign to raise funds for prevention and to help find missing children. Due to his work, he was appointed World Vision HIV/AIDS Ambassador. In recent years, Rain has been an advocate for environmental protection going as far as to volunteer in the Taean oil spill cleanup and donate 300 million won for clean water and clothing for the residents in 2008. In 2009, Rain was involved with MTV EXIT, a campaign against human trafficking in Asia. Over the years, he has performed at concerts for various charitable causes. On May 5, 2022, Rain donated 100 million won to the G-Foundation Foundation of the International Organization for Development (International Development Cooperation NGO G-Foundation) on the occasion of Children's Day.

== Controversies ==
On his World 2007 tour, his scheduled concerts in Shanghai, Toronto, San Francisco, and Hawaii were canceled, followed by the last concert in Los Angeles. The last event at the Staples Center was canceled only two hours prior to opening: Rain's producer blamed the situation on financial problems of the local promoter, while the local promoter blamed Wellmade STAR M calling them too "incompetent to handle the situation".

On March 19, 2009, a federal jury in Honolulu found that Rain, his former management agency JYP Entertainment, and two other promotion companies were guilty of breaching a contract and defrauding Honolulu promoter Click Entertainment for $2 million (originally just over $1 million) after the Hawaii concert was canceled and the promoters were not refunded the $500,000 licensing fee. Rain and JYP were ordered to pay $2.4 million each in punitive damages, $1 million for damages related to the fraud, and $2.3 million for breach of contract.

A separate lawsuit filed by promoters Wellmade STAR M was dismissed by a South Korean court on January 28, 2010. Judge Bae Kwang-Kuk ruled in favor of Rain and blamed the plaintiff for poor preparations surrounding the canceled U.S. tour.

In April 2010, Rain and other J. Tune Creative shareholders were accused of embezzling money from the company by a fabric manufacturing company. The company claimed they suffered financial losses. Rain and the shareholders were acquitted of the charges in December of that year. He was reinvestigated in September 2011 after a discrepancy was found, but was later acquitted again in June 2013.

== Personal life ==
=== Military service ===
Rain fulfilled his mandatory military service from October 2011 until July 2013. He was named the top marksman of the 5th Infantry Division boot camp, and was chosen as the assistant instructor. He was appointed promotional ambassador by the Military Manpower Administration, and appeared in a documentary about the defense industry entitled "Defense Report 2012".

=== Marriage and children ===
In January 2013, Rain confirmed that he was dating actress Kim Tae-hee, which then caused an investigation into whether his dating had broken military rules during his mandatory military service. In 2014, he was received into the Catholic Church with the baptismal name Michael, the same religion as Kim. The couple married on January 19, 2017, after five years of dating. On October 25, 2017, Kim gave birth to their first child. She gave birth to their second child on September 19, 2019.

== Discography ==
- Bad Guy (2002)
- How to Avoid the Sun (2003)
- It's Raining (2004)
- Eternal Rain (2006)
- Rain's World (2006)
- Rainism (2008)
- Rain Effect (2014)

== Concerts and tours ==
World tours

- Rainy Day Tour (2005–2006)
- Rain's Coming World Tour (2006–2007)
- Legend of Rainism Tour (2009–2010)
- Still Raining Tour (2023–2026)

Asia tours

- Rain Loves Japan Zepp Tour (2010)
- The Best Show Tour (2011)
- Story of Rain: 2013 Rain Zepp Tour (2013)
- Rain Effect China Concert Series (2014)
- The Squall World Tour (2015–2016)

== Filmography ==
=== Film ===
Year	Title	Role	Notes	Ref.
2006	I'm a Cyborg, But That's OK	Park Il-sun		
2008	Speed Racer	Taejo Togokahn		
2009	Ninja Assassin	Raizo		
2012	R2B: Return to Base	Jung Tae-yoon		
2014	The Prince	Mark		
2014	For Love or Money	Xu Chengxun		
2018	Race to Freedom: Um Bok Dong	Uhm Bok-dong		

=== Television series ===
Year	Title	Role	Notes	Ref.
2003	Sang Doo! Let's Go to School	Cha Sang-doo		
2004	Full House	Lee Young-jae		
2004	Old Miss Diary	Himself	Cameo	
2005	Banjun Drama	Himself	4 episodes	
2005	A Love to Kill	Kang Bok-gu		
2010	The Fugitive: Plan B	Ji-woo		
2014	My Lovely Girl	Hyun Wook		
2015	Diamond Lover	Xiao Liang	Chinese drama	
2016	Come Back Mister	Lee Hae-joon / Kim Young-soo		
2018	Sketch	Kang Dong-soo		
2019	Welcome 2 Life	Lee Jae-sang		
2022	Ghost Doctor	Cha Young-min		
2022	Under the Queen's Umbrella	A Passerby	Cameo (episode 7)	
2026	Bloodhounds	Baek Jeong	Season 2	

=== Web series ===
Year	Title	Role	Notes	Ref.
2024	Red Swan	Seo Do-yoon		

=== Television show ===
Year	Title	Role	Notes	Ref.
2002–2003	Soulmate	Host	with Kang Ho-dong	
2008–2010	Rainy Day	Himself	Mnet Japan reality show	
2009	Rain on Trip	Himself	Olive TV reality show	
2013–2014	Rain Effect	Himself	Mnet promotional reality show	
2017	The Unit	Host & Mentor		
2017	Rain Is Back	Himself	KBS comeback special for My Life	
2020	I-Land	Judge & Mentor		
2020	Hangout with Yoo	Member of SSAK3 under stage name B-Ryong	Alongside Yoo-Dragon (Yoo Jaesuk) & Linda-G (Lee Hyori), featuring Kwanghee	
2021	Glutton and Furry	Cast Member	with Noh Hong-chul	
2022	Be Mbitious	Host		
2022	Take 1	Participant		
2023	Asia Super Young	Mentor		
2026	The Village Barber	Part-timer	Season 1	

=== Documentary ===
Year	Title	Network	Notes	Ref.
2008	Rain Is Coming	MBC	Biographical TV documentary	
2009	Legend of Rain	Mnet	Biographical TV documentary	
2009	Hip Korea	Discovery Channel	Biographical TV documentary	

=== Hosting ===
Year	Title	Notes	Ref.
2002–2004	Music Bank	with Shoo	

== Notes ==
Awards and achievements
Preceded by Incumbent	KBS Song Festival – Best New Artist; 2002	Succeeded by Se7en
Preceded by Incumbent	SBS Music Awards – Best New Artist; 2002	Succeeded by Se7en
Preceded by Incumbent	4th Mnet Asian Music Awards – Best New Artist; 2002	Succeeded by Se7en
Preceded by Incumbent	17th Golden Disk Awards – Best New Artist; 2002	Succeeded by Big Mama
Preceded by Incumbent	6th Mnet Asian Music Awards – Artist of the Year; 2004	Succeeded by TVXQ
Preceded by Incumbent	6th Mnet Asian Music Awards – Album of the Year; 2004	Succeeded by SG Wannabe
Preceded by Incumbent	6th Mnet Asian Music Awards – Song of the Year; 2004	Succeeded by SG Wannabe
Preceded by Lee Hyori	10th Mnet Asian Music Awards – Best Dance Music; 2010	Succeeded by Hyuna
