= Rainism =

Studio album by Rain
- Released: October 15, 2008
- Recorded: 2008
- Genres: K-pop; R&B
- Length: 42:11
- Languages: Korean; Chinese; Japanese
- Labels: J. Tune; Warner Music Asia; Pony Canyon
- Producers: Rain; Kim Tae-wan; Bae Jin-ryeol; Jo Hyeon-cheol; Kim Tae-seong; Hyeon Joon; Choi Jeong-min; Kwon Seong-min

Rain chronology
Rain's World (2006)	Rainism (2008)	Back to the Basic (2010)

Alternative cover
- Asian Special Edition and Japanese edition cover

Singles from Rainism
- 1. "Love Story" Released: October 15, 2008; 2. "Rainism" Released: October 15, 2008; 3. "September 12th" Released: March 4, 2009

Rainism is the fifth Korean-language studio album by South Korean recording artist Rain, released on October 15, 2008. The album was released through J. Tune Entertainment, a subsidiary of JYP Entertainment, and marked the singer's first record released under the J. Tune label. The album produced the singles "Love Story" and the title track "Rainism", the latter of which became one of Rain's signature songs. The album was released in four formats throughout Asia, with Rain also recording its two singles in Chinese and English.

Rainism sold over 131,000 copies in 2008 according to the South Korean Hanteo record chart, and was ranked as the fifth best-selling album of the year. A Japanese edition of the album was released through Pony Canyon on January 7, 2009, which peaked at number 25 on the Oricon Albums Chart with sales of 9,000 copies. A repackage of the album, titled Rainism Recollection, was made available on March 5, 2009. To support the album, Rain embarked on the Legend of Rainism Tour which spanned 14 shows across Asia and North America.

== Background and release ==
Rainism was released in various formats throughout Southeast Asia. The album was released with a new cover. Each version was released with the original track list as well as international versions of his two singles, ″Love Story″ and "Rainism", in English, Japanese and Chinese.

The album was re-released in South Korea on March 5, 2009. The album was retitled, Rainism Recollection and packaged as a limited edition album with new album art. The album was packaged as a three disc album. The first disc containing original track listing (removing the original version of Rainism and replacing it with the clean version), the second disc included all international versions of his two singles, "Love Story" and "Rainism", in addition to several bonus acoustic tracks and a remix of the song Fresh Woman. Disc 3 was a DVD including the music video for the first single Love Story.

== Controversy ==
On November 24, 2008, The Commission of Youth Protection judged Rain's album, Rainism, inappropriate for people under 19 years old because of the song "Rainism". In "Rainism", the lyrics (translated from Korean) "Trembling inside your shaking body is my magic stick/Feeling the impassable limit of the body shake" became a problem, as "magic stick" had connotations of a penis. Rain re-released a "clean version" of "Rainism" shortly after, but instead of changing the original album's contents, the original song was still included on the soundtrack, but marked as inappropriate for those under 19 years old.

== Singles ==
Rain released Love Story, as the first single from the album, shortly followed by the single, Rainism. Both songs were re-recorded in four languages and served as that version for the appropriate country (an English version was issued to SE Asia radio). It was stated that Fresh Woman would be released as a single, but proof of this has not appeared. Rain performed the track, Only You, in support of the re-release of Rainism in South Korea. However, Only You, is not an official single.

== Promotion ==
To promote the release, Rain went on a world tour titled The Legend of Rainism Tour. The tour began in Seoul and included stops in Japan, China, Singapore and Indonesia, for a total of 28 concerts in 9 countries.

== Accolades ==
On December 10, 2008, Rainism received the Album Bonsang at the 23rd Golden Disc Awards. The title track "Rainism" additionally achieved the top spots on the music programs Inkigayo and M Countdown, and won the Best Asian Pop Song award at the 2009 Hito Music Awards.

Paste named Rainism one of The 30 Greatest K-pop Albums of All Time, while Rolling Stone ranked the single "Rainism" number 36 in their list of the 100 Greatest Songs in the History of Korean Pop Music, writing that it "cinched [Rain's] status as K-pop's most overtly sexy star" with its suggestive lyrics "over the top of a throbbing beat".

Music program awards for "Rainism"
Program	Date	Ref.
Inkigayo	November 2, 2008	
M Countdown	November 6, 2008	
M Countdown	November 27, 2008	

== Track listing ==
Rainism track listing
No.	Title	Lyrics	Music	Length
1.	"My Way (Intro)"	Jung Ji-hoon	Kim Tae-wan, Jung Ji-hoon	0:43
2.	"Rainism"	Jung Ji-hoon	Bae Jin-ryeol, Jung Ji-hoon	3:35
3.	"Only You"	Jo Hyun-chul	Jo Hyun-chul	4:14
4.	"Love Story" (0912......그 이후)	Jung Ji-hoon	Kim Tae-seong, Hyeon Joon (V.O.S)	4:03
5.	"Love Is" (사랑이라는 건)	Jung Ji-hoon	Kim Mi Seon	3:36
6.	"My Girl" (내 여자)	Jung Ji-hoon	Kim Tae-wan, Jung Ji-hoon	3:22
7.	"You"	Jung Ji-hoon, Kim Tae-wan	Kim Tae-wan, Jung Ji-hoon, Jo Hyeon-cheol	2:37
8.	"Fresh Woman"	Kim Tae-wan	Kim Tae-wan	3:15
9.	"More Attraction" (더 끌려; featuring C-Luv)	Kim Tae-wan, Jung Ji-hoon	Kim Tae-wan	3:42
10.	"Turn Your Head" (고개 돌려)	Kim Tae-wan	Kim Tae-wan, Choi Jeong-min	2:57
11.	"September 12th" (9월 12일)	Jung Ji-hoon	Kim Tae-wan, Kwon Seong-min	3:33
12.	"My Way"	Jung Ji-hoon	Kim Tae-wan, Jung Ji-hoon	2:59
13.	"Rainism" (Remix)	Jung Ji-hoon	Bae Jin-ryeol, Jung Ji-hoon	1:43
Total length:				42:11

Asian Special Version – Chinese release
No.	Title	Lyrics	Music	Length
14.	"Rainism" (Chinese version)	Jung Ji-hoon	Bae Jin-ryeol, Jung Ji-hoon	3:35
15.	"Love Story" (Chinese version)	Jung Ji-hoon	Kim Tae-seong, Hyeon Joon (V.O.S)	4:03
16.	"Rainism" (English version)	Jung Ji-hoon	Bae Jin-ryeol, Jung Ji-hoon	3:35
17.	"Love Story" (English version)	Jung Ji-hoon	Kim Tae-seong, Hyeon Joon (V.O.S)	4:03
Total length:				57:27

Japanese Edition
No.	Title	Lyrics	Music	Length
14.	"Rainism (Japanese Version)"	Jung Ji-hoon	Bae Jin-ryeol, Jung Ji-hoon	3:35
15.	"Love Story (Japanese Version)"	Jung Ji-hoon	Kim Tae-seong, Hyeon Joon (V.O.S)	4:03
16.	"Rainism (English Version)"	Jung Ji-hoon	Bae Jin-ryeol, Jung Ji-hoon	3:35
17.	"Love Story (English Version)"	Jung Ji-hoon	Kim Tae-seong, Hyeon Joon (V.O.S)	4:03
Total length:				57:27

Southeast Asian Edition
No.	Title	Lyrics	Music	Length
15.	"Rainism (English Version)"	Jung Ji-hoon	Bae Jin-ryeol, Jung Ji-hoon	3:35
16.	"Love Story (English Version)"	Jung Ji-hoon	Kim Tae-seong, Hyeon Joon (V.O.S)	4:03
Total length:				49:49

Rainism Recollection Disc 1
No.	Title	Lyrics	Music	Length
1.	"My Way (Intro)"	Jung Ji-hoon	Kim Tae-wan, Jung Ji-hoon	0:43
2.	"Rainism (Clean Version)"	Jung Ji-hoon	Bae Jin-ryeol, Jung Ji-hoon	3:35
3.	"Only You"	Jo Hyeon-cheol	Jo Hyeon-cheol	4:14
4.	"Love Story" (0912......그 이후)	Jung Ji-hoon	Kim Tae-seong, Hyeon Joon (V.O.S)	4:03
5.	"Love Is" (사랑이라는 건)	Jung Ji-hoon	Kim Mi Seon	3:36
6.	"My Girl" (내 여자)	Jung Ji-hoon	Kim Tae-wan, Jung Ji-hoon	3:22
7.	"You"	Kim Tae-wan, Jung Ji-hoon	Kim Tae-wan, Ji Hoon, Jo Hyeon-cheol	2:37
8.	"Fresh Woman"	Kim Tae-wan	Kim Tae-wan	3:15
9.	"More Attraction" (더 끌려; featuring C-Luv)	Kim Tae-wan, Jung Ji-hoon	Kim Tae-wan	3:42
10.	"Turn Your Head" (고개 돌려)	Kim Tae-wan	Kim Tae-wan, Choi Jeong-min	2:57
11.	"September 12th" (9월 12일)	Jung Ji-hoon	Kim Tae-wan, Kwon Seong-min	3:33
12.	"My Way"	Jung Ji-hoon	Kim Tae-wan, Jung Ji-hoon	2:59
13.	"Rainism (Remix) (Clean Version)"	Jung Ji-hoon	Bae Jin-ryeol, Jung Ji-hoon	1:43
Total length:				42:11

Rainism Recollection Disc 2 – Bonus Material
No.	Title	Lyrics	Music	Length
1.	"Love Is (Acoustic Version)" (사랑이라는 건)	Jung Ji-hoon	Kim Mi Seon	3:36
2.	"My Girl (Acoustic Version)" (내 여자)	Jung Ji-hoon	Kim Tae-wan, Jung Ji-hoon	3:22
3.	"September 12th (Acoustic Version)" (9월 12일)	Jung Ji-hoon	Kim Tae-wan, Kwon Seong-min	3:33
4.	"Rainism (English Version)"	Jung Ji-hoon	Bae Jin-ryeol, Jung Ji-hoon	3:35
5.	"Love Story (English Version)"	Jung Ji-hoon	Kim Tae-seong, Hyeon Joon (V.O.S)	4:03
6.	"Rainism (Japanese Version)"	Jung Ji-hoon	Bae Jin-ryeol, Jung Ji-hoon	3:35
7.	"Love Story (Japanese Version)"	Jung Ji-hoon	Kim Tae-seong, Hyeon Joon (V.O.S)	4:03
8.	"Rainism (Chinese Version)"	Jung Ji-hoon	Bae Jin-ryeol, Jung Ji-hoon	3:35
9.	"Love Story (Chinese Version)"	Jung Ji-hoon	Kim Tae-seong, Hyeon Joon (V.O.S)	4:03
Total length:				15:44

Rainism Recollection Disc 3 – DVD
No.	Title	Length
1.	"Love Story" (0912......그 이후)
Total length:		35:00

== Charts ==
2008–2009 weekly chart performance
Chart (2008–09)	Peak position
Japanese Albums (Oricon)	22
Japanese Top Albums (Billboard)	53
Taiwanese Albums (G-Music)	10
Taiwanese East Asian Albums (G-Music)	2

2011 weekly chart performance
Chart (2011)	Peak position
South Korean Albums (Gaon)	33

== Sales ==
Region	Certification	Certified units/sales
Japan	—	9,000
South Korea	—	131,571

== Release history ==
Release history and formats for Rainism
Region	Date	Version	Label(s)
Various	October 15, 2008	Korean	J. Tune Entertainment
Asia	December 27, 2008	Asian Special Edition	Warner
Japan	January 7, 2009	Japanese	Pony Canyon
South Korea	March 5, 2009	Rainism Recollection	J. Tune
