= Park Jin-young filmography =

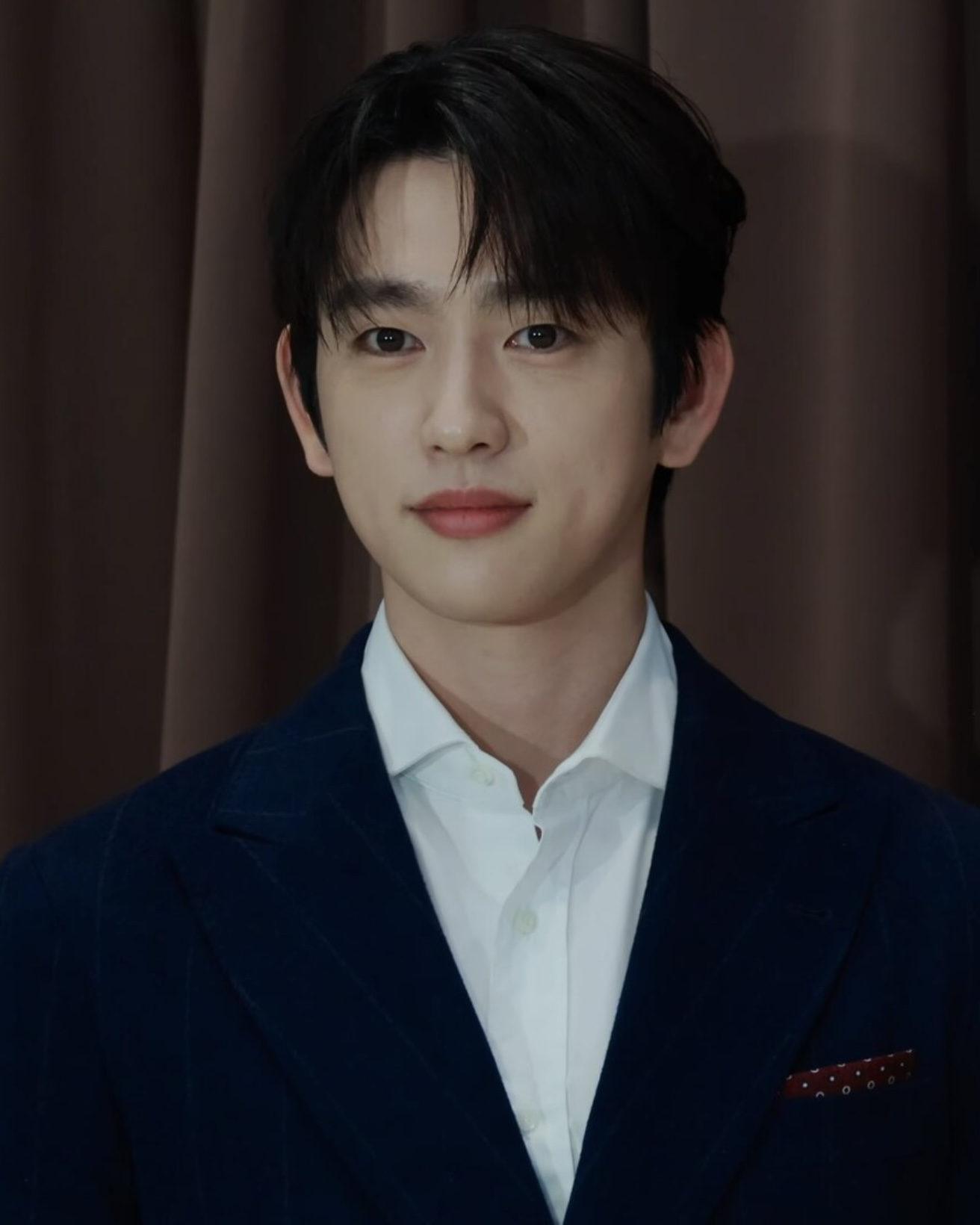
- Park in 2025
- Film: 6
- Television series: 15
- Web series: 3
- Television show: 4
- Radio show: 3
- Hosting: 6
- Music videos: 12
- Advertising: 10

Park Jin-young, known mononymously as Jinyoung, is a South Korean singer, actor, and songwriter.

Key
| † | Denotes films that have not yet been released |

== Film ==
| Year | Title | Role | Notes | Ref. |
|---|---|---|---|---|
| 2016 | Sanctuary | Jin-young | Thai short film | |
| 2017 | A Stray Goat | Jo Min-sik | | |
| 2021 | News From Nowhere: Freedom Village | Himself | MMCA Hyundai short film | |
| 2021 | Concept Korea New York S/S 2022 | Himself | New York Fashion Week short film | |
| 2022 | Yaksha: Ruthless Operations | Jeong-dae | | |
| 2022 | Princess Aya | Prince Bari (voice) | Korean dub | |
| 2022 | Christmas Carol | Joo Il-woo / Joo Wol-woo | | |
| 2025 | Hi-Five | Young-chun | | |

== Television series ==
| Year | Title | Role | Notes | Ref. |
|---|---|---|---|---|
| 2012 | Dream High 2 | Jung Ui-bong | Under JYPE | |
| 2013 | When a Man Falls in Love | Ddol-yi | | |
| 2015 | This is My Love | 17-year-old Ji Eun-ho / Park Hyun-soo | | |
| 2016 | The Legend of the Blue Sea | teenage Heo Joon-jae / Kim Dam-ryung | | |
| 2019 | He Is Psychometric | Lee Ahn | | |
| 2019 | Melting Me Softly | Jang Woo-shin | Cameo (episode 14) | |
| 2020 | When My Love Blooms | young Han Jae-hyun | | |
| 2021 | The Devil Judge | Kim Ga-on / Kang Isaac | | |
| 2021–2022 | Yumi's Cells | Yoo Ba-bi / Bobby | Season 1–2 | |
| 2022 | Reborn Rich | Shin Gyeong-min | Cameo (episode 1) | |
| 2024 | Chicken Nugget | Yoo Tae-young | Cameo (episodes 4–5) | |
| 2025 | The Witch | Lee Dong-jin | | |
| 2025 | Our Unwritten Seoul | Lee Ho-soo | | |
| 2026 | Still Shining | Yeon Tae-seo | | |
| 2026 | 100 Days of Deception | Kim Tae-woong / Sato Hideo | | |

== Web series ==
| Year | Title | Role | Notes | Ref. |
|---|---|---|---|---|
| 2015 | Dream Knight | Junior | Korean-Chinese web series by JYP and Youku Tudou | |
| 2015 | This is My Love: The Beginning | teenage Ji Eun-ho / Park Hyun-soo | | |
| 2017 | School of Magic | Nara | | |

== Television shows ==
| Year | Title | Role | Notes | Ref. |
|---|---|---|---|---|
| 2017 | Master Key | Recurring cast | Episodes 4 and 6 | |
| 2018 | Living Together in Empty Room | Cast member | with Han Hye-yeon and Block B's P.O, episodes 30–33 | |
| 2018 | King of Mask Singer | Contestant | as Rabbit, episodes 179 and 180 | |
| 2022 | Off The Grid | Main cast | | |

== Hosting ==
| Year | Title | Notes | Ref. |
|---|---|---|---|
| 2015–2016 | M Countdown | with Lee Jung-shin, Key and BamBam | |
| 2017–2018 | Inkigayo | with Jisoo (Blackpink) and Doyoung (NCT) | |
| 2017 | Inkigayo Super Concert in Daejeon | with Jisoo and V | |
| 2019 | KBS Song Festival | with Irene (Red Velvet) | |
| 2020 | Seoul International Drama Awards | with Kim Soo-ro and Park Ji-min | |
| 2023 | 75th Song For Hero | with Joo Si-eun | |

== Music video appearances ==
| Year | Title | Artist | Director | Notes |
|---|---|---|---|---|
| 2010 | "Tasty San" (맛좋은산) | San E, Min | | |
| 2012 | "We are the B" (B급 인생) | Jr., Kang So-ra, 2AM's Jeong Jinwoon, Kim Ji-soo | | Dream High 2 OST |
| 2014 | "Feel" | Junho | | |
| 2015 | "Speed Up" | Melody Day | | |
| 2018 | "My Youth" | Got7 | Naive Creative Production | Solo song from Got7's album Present: You |
| 2018 | "Hold Me" (이렇게) | Park Jin-young | | Top Management OST |
| 2022 | "Shining on Your Night" (달이 될게) | Park Jin-young | | Yumi's Cells 2 OST |
| 2022 | "You Can Be Loved" | Park Jin-young and Baek A-yeon | | Princess Aya OST |
| 2023 | "Cotton Candy" | Park Jin-young | | Chapter 0: With EP |
| 2025 | "Christmas Fever" | Park Jin-young | Youngeun Yoo (Yooye) | |
| 2026 | "Everlove" | Park Jin-young | | Said & Done EP |
| 2026 | "Last Love" | Choi Yu-ree | | |

== Advertising ==
| Year | Company | Brand/business | Notes | Ref. |
|---|---|---|---|---|
| 2015 | SK Telecom | Let's Be Strange Episode 15 | Promotional campaign | |
| 2020 | Tom Ford | Tom Ford | Fragrance | |
| 2022 | Klay City | District RE:building Project | Promotional campaign | |
| 2022 | L&P Cosmetics | Mediheal | Cosmetics | |
| 2022 | Narciso Rodriguez | Narciso Rodriguez | Fragrance | |
| 2025 | Molton Brown | Molton Brown | Fragrance and body care | |
| 2025 | Cilantro Co., Ltd. | Dentiste | Oral care | |
| 2026 | Tempur | Tempur | Mattress | |
| 2026 | Naver | Naver Pay | Mobile payment service | |
| 2026 | Ovcos Co., Ltd | Deoproce | Skin care | |

== Radio program ==
| Year | Title | Role | Notes | Ref. |
|---|---|---|---|---|
| 2016 | Kiss the Radio | Special host | with Young-jae | |
| 2017 | Kiss the Radio | Special host | with Young-jae (23–26 October) | |
| 2018 | Kiss the Radio | Special host | with Young-jae (15 January) and Yugyeom (5–6 March) | |
