= Mark Tuan =

American rapper (born 1993)

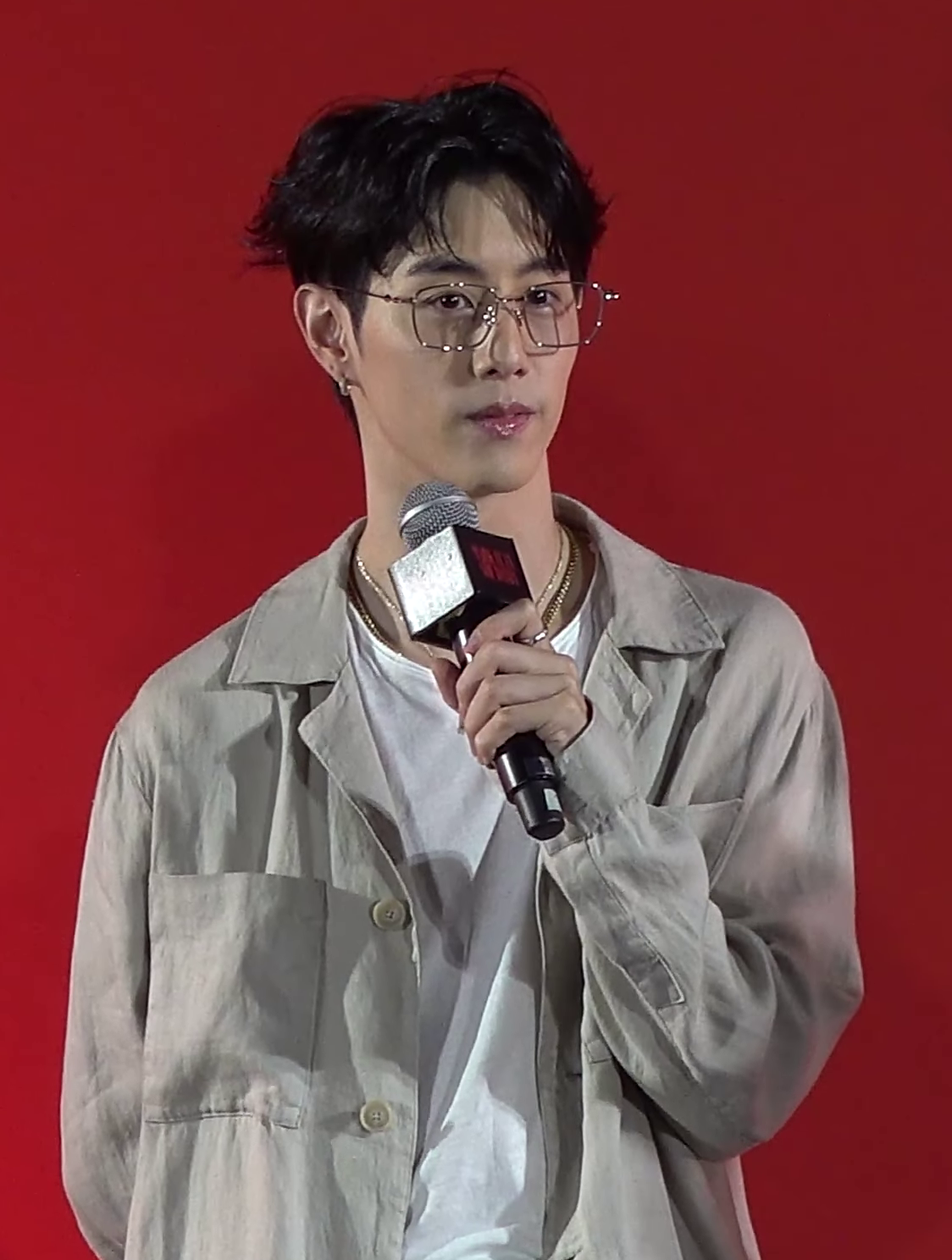
- Tuan in March 2024
- Born: Mark Yien Tuan; September 4, 1993 (age 33); Los Angeles, California, U.S.
- Occupations: Rapper; singer; songwriter
- Musical career
- Genres: K-pop; C-pop
- Instrument: Vocals
- Years active: 2014–present
- Labels: JYP; Mark Tuan Studio; DNA Records; Creative Artists Agency; Transparent Arts
- Member of: Got7
- Website: Official website

Chinese name
- Chinese: 段宜恩
Transcriptions
Standard Mandarin
- Hanyu Pinyin: Duàn Yí'ēn
Yue: Cantonese
- Jyutping: Dyun6 Ji4-jan1

Signature
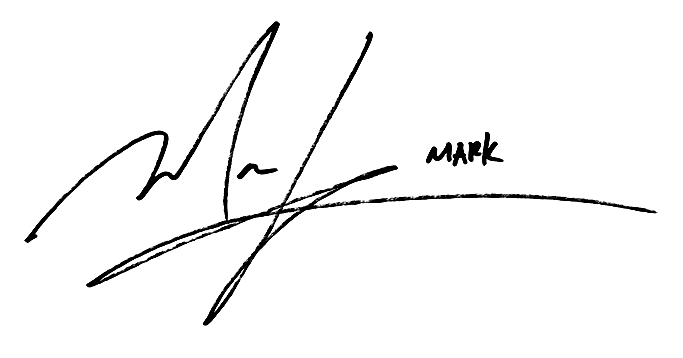

Mark Tuan (born Mark Yien Tuan (Chinese: 段宜恩; pinyin: Duàn Yí'ēn; Korean: 마크투안); September 4, 1993), also known mononymously as Mark, is an American rapper and singer. He is a member of the South Korean boy band Got7.

In 2022, Tuan released his first studio album The Other Side and embarked on his first solo tour that same year.

== Biography ==
Born as Mark Yien Tuan in Los Angeles, California, he spent a number of years in Paraguay and Brazil before eventually returning to California, where he grew up. He is Taiwanese, and has two older sisters and one younger brother. He took violin and piano lessons in elementary school, and moved to guitar in junior high school.

He attended Arcadia High School in Arcadia, California. In 2010, while with his friends at school, he caught the attention of a JYP Entertainment scout, who invited him to the auditions. Tuan had no desire to pursue a musical career but was encouraged by his friends and family who told him it was a good opportunity and thus, he gave it a try. He subsequently passed the audition and dropped out of school, which he attended until grade 10. He moved to South Korea in August 2010, where he learned acrobatics for one year, and martial arts for two years. Learning to sing, rap and dance, and performing on a stage as a trainee, inspired him to pursue the idol life and to become a singer.

== Career ==
=== 2012–2013: Pre-debut ===
In 2012, Tuan made a cameo in the first episode of Dream High 2 as a backup dancer alongside JB and Jinyoung, who later became members of Got7 with him.

He appeared in the fourth episode of Mnet's 2013 reality-survival program WIN: Who is Next, which presented iKon and Winner members, who at the time were still trainees under YG Entertainment. It also featured future fellow Got7 members' Jackson Wang, BamBam and Yugyeom.

=== 2014–2020: Debut and solo activities in China ===
On January 16, 2014, Tuan debuted as a part of K-pop boy group Got7, with the EP Got It?. Since his debut, Tuan has expressed his goals in working harder to become a singer-songwriter and making his own music. He began writing rap and lyrics with the track "Back To Me" from Got7's 2015 extended play Just Right, then participated in the rap and lyric making for five out of thirteen songs from the 2016 album Flight Log: Turbulence. With Got7's third studio album Present: You, Tuan released his first Korean solo song "OMW" featuring fellow member Jackson Wang; an accompanying music video was published on September 13, 2018. As of December 2021, Tuan is credited as songwriter on twenty Got7's songs and on eight as co-composer.

With Dazed Korea May 2017 issue, Tuan launched his career as a model on magazines across South Korea, China and Thailand, appearing on over 21 magazines cover as of April 2021. He has also released two limited edition apparel collections with Represent in 2018 and 2019 titled XCIII, helping in the creation and designing of each piece. The second collection, XCIII Evolution, sold more than 35,000 items, and all the profits proceeded to Save the Children.

On February 10, 2018, Tuan, along with fellow member BamBam, held the "Project Blur" fan meeting in Thailand at MCC Hall The Mall Ngamwongwan, whose tickets sold out in a minute. In the spring of 2019, he joined Jus2 in their "Focus" Premiere Showcase in Asia, acting as the MC for Macau (April 7), Taipei (April 14) and Singapore (May 4) stops.

Tuan's increasing presence in the Chinese market began in 2018 with photoshoots, participation in events and interviews. In January 2019, the variety show Change Your Life (重量级改变) marked his first television appearance in mainland China. On April 11, 2019, Tuan attended the Weibo Starlight Awards in Hong Kong and won the Hot Star Award.

In 2019, Tuan toured China for his first set of fan meetings, titled "On Your Mark". The first one in Nanjing was held on July 20, 2019, and sold out all 3,000 seats within the first minute. The event also saw the signing of his first photobook, Mark Yixia, which had been earlier released on June 30. The second fan meeting was held on September 14 in Chengdu. As both the shows were well received by local fans, they were followed by an additional and final stop in Shanghai on January 11, 2020. On the day of the last fan meeting, he released his first Chinese single, "Outta My Head". His second single, titled "Never Told You" (从未对你说过), was released as a charity single on White Day.

From June 15 until August 28, 2020, Tuan appeared on eight episodes of Huya Super Idol League Season 10 as "Gamer Mark".

=== 2021–2024: Departure from JYPE and The Other Side ===
In January 2021, Tuan, along with the other six members of Got7, chose not to renew his contract with JYP Entertainment. He moved back to the USA and opened a YouTube channel which shortly gained over a million subscribers before he had posted any content to it.

The opening of his company Mark Tuan Studio in Beijing was announced on February 7 with focus on his solo Chinese activities and promotions. Meanwhile, he also set up a new label, DNA Records, together with his friends. On February 12, he released the single "One in a Million" in collaboration with Sanjoy Deb. An animated music video, which Tuan was also an executive producer of, was then released on his YouTube channel on Valentine's Day. He also served as the executive producer of Got7's "Encore" music video released on February 20, 2021.

A third apparel collection in collaboration with Represent, named XC3, went on sale on March 17. On April 29, Tuan signed with Creative Artists Agency.

In the second half of the year, Tuan sang "Never Gonna Come Down" with Bibi for the movie Shang-Chi and the Legend of the Ten Rings. On November 12, 2021, he released the digital single "Last Breath." He subsequently released other songs in 2022, namely "My Life" on January 21, "Lonely" on March 24, and "Save Me" on April 7.

From May 27 to May 29, 2022, he held a sold-out solo fan meeting in Thailand titled "Pull-Up."

On July 1, 2022, Tuan released the digital single "IMYSM". The song was the fifth and last single extracted from his first studio album The Other Side, which was published on August 26, 2022 together with the music video of title track "Far Away." The singer was credited both for songwriting and composition across every song of the 20-track record, showcasing both his singing and rapping abilities. In October and November, Tuan subsequently embarked in his first solo tour and performed in 15 cities across North America; the Asian leg started in Bangkok and Khon Kaen in April 2023. In the meantime, his new collaboration with Represent went on sale in mid December.

On March 31, 2023, he released the single "Carry Me Out". Along with following releases "Everyone Else Fades" and "Your World", the song was included in Tuan's digital EP Fallin', which was released on October 27, presenting less moody music compared to his first album. The singer subsequently toured Asia and Latin America with additional stops of The Other Side world tour throughout 2024.

=== 2025–present: Silhouette ===
In June 2025, he released a new single titled "High As You", showcasing a more mature sound. Two months later, he signed a partnership with Thai entertainment agency BNJ for his activities in Thailand. On November 7, 2025, Tuan released his second extended play Silhouette, which charted at #19 on the South Korean Circle Weekly Album Chart.

In April 2026, he released the single "Alone", followed by "Nightlight", a collaboration with Milli, in October.

== Personal life ==
Growing up in the US and coming from a Taiwanese family, Tuan can speak both English and Mandarin Chinese, as well as having learned Korean and Japanese.

In December 2018, Tuan suffered from a leg injury while practicing martial arts tricks for the JYP Nation stage on 2018 KBS Song Festival and could not perform at the event or at later schedules including the fifth anniversary fan meeting for Got7, therefore he stayed seated for most of the concert.

== Other ventures ==
=== Philanthropy ===
In March 2019, Tuan became the cover of the 200th issue of the Korean charitable magazine The Big Issue, which provides support for the homeless. He has also supported charity through his clothing line collaborations with Represent and his second single, "Never Told You". The latter was released in collaboration with the China Children's Charity Relief Foundation, and their partnership also saw the sale of a sweater in collaboration with ETET to help children in Heqing County in Yunnan Province.

In February 2020, he donated towards the purchase of ventilators for the COVID-19 pandemic in Hubei, China. On May 31, Tuan donated $7,000 to the George Floyd Memorial Fund and the Black Lives Matter movement in light of events in the US. In November, he donated $1,500 to the victims of Typhoon Ulysses. In April 2021, Tuan donated $30,000 to Stop AAPI Hate.

In September 2024, he partnered with Siam Center to auction some of his exclusive unseen photos to raise money to help flood victims in Thailand. In December 2025, he donated 1 million baht to NGO The Mirror Foundation to support emergency response efforts in several flood-affected areas across Thailand.

=== Endorsements ===
In 2019, Tuan became Vivo brand ambassador in Thailand alongside group member BamBam. In China, he became the brand ambassador for Davines in April 2019 and Mentholatum on May 27, 2020 for Mentholatum Acnes, having previously endorsed Mentholatum's Lip Tiara in December 2019, which was restocked multiple times due to the high demand. In August 2020, Tuan became the brand ambassador for China Unicom, a large telecommunications operator in China.

On June 2, 2021, he became the ambassador for Sisley's Black Rose Skin Infusion Cream, while on June 16, Tuan collaborated with Anessa for a limited edition Artist Box, becoming the first artist to do so.

== Discography ==
=== Studio albums ===
List of studio albums, showing selected details, selected chart positions, and sales figures
Title	Details	Peak chart positions	Sales
Title	Details	KOR	Sales
The Other Side	Released: August 26, 2022; Label: DNA Records; Formats: CD, digital download, streaming	8	KOR: 35,365

=== Extended plays ===
Title	Details	Peak chart positions	Sales
Title	Details	KOR	Sales
Fallin'	Released: October 27, 2023; Label: DNA Records; Formats: digital download, streaming	—	—N/a
Silhouette	Released: November 7, 2025; Label: Transparent Arts, DNA Records; Formats: CD, digital download, streaming	19	KOR: 14,767

=== Singles ===
Title	Year	Peak chart positions	Album
Title	Year	KOR Down.	Album
"Outta My Head"	2020	—	Non-album singles
"Never Told You" (从未对你说过)	2020	—	Non-album singles
"One in a Million" (with Sanjoy Deb)	2021	—	Non-album singles
"Never Gonna Come Down" (with Bibi)	2021	—	Shang-Chi and the Legend of the Ten Rings: The Album
"Last Breath"	2021	122	The Other Side
"My Life"	2022	102	The Other Side
"Lonely"	2022	104	The Other Side
"Save Me"	2022	—	The Other Side
"IMYSM"	2022	—	The Other Side
"IMYSM" (Niiko x Swae Remix)	2022	—	Non-album singles
"Far Away" (Crankdat Remix)	2022	—	Non-album singles
"Carry Me Out"	2023	—	Fallin'
"Right Before Our Eyes" (with Elephante and Beauz)	2023	—	Non-album single
"Everyone Else Fades"	2023	—	Fallin'
"Your World"	2023	—	Fallin'
"Superpower" (with Kiss of Life) (Note: Official anthem of VALORANT Champions Seoul.)	2024	—	Non-album single
"High As You"	2025	—	Silhouette
"Hold Still"	2025	—	Silhouette
"Sunsets and Cigarettes"	2025	—	Silhouette
"Alone"	2026	—	Non-album singles
"Nightlight" (feat. Milli)	2026	—	Non-album singles

=== Songwriting credits ===
All song credits, under Mark (10010921), are adapted from the Korea Music Copyright Association's database, unless otherwise noted.

Year	Artist	Title	Album	Lyrics		Music	
Year	Artist	Title	Album	Credited	With	Credited	With
2015	Got7	"Back To Me"	Just Right	Yes	Yoon Jong-sung, Jang Jung-seok (Sum People), Jackson Wang	No	—N/a
2015	Got7	"Feelin' Good" (느낌이 좋아)	Mad: Winter Edition	Yes	Chloe, Noday, Jackson	No	—N/a
2015	Got7	"Good"	Mad: Winter Edition	Yes	E.One, Lee Mansung, Jackson	No	—N/a
2016	Got7	"Can't" (하겠어)	Flight Log: Departure	Yes	Jinyoung	No	—N/a
2016	Got7	"See the Light" (빛이나)	Flight Log: Departure	Yes	Yugyeom, BamBam, Frants	Yes	Yugyeom, Frants
2016	JYP Nation	"Encore"	Non-album single	Yes	J.Y.Park "The Asiansoul", Armadillo, Kim Seung-soo, Yugyeom, Jackson Wang	No	—N/a
2016	Got7	"No Jam" (노잼)	Flight Log: Turbulence	Yes	Yugyeom, BamBam, Frants, Jackson	Yes	Yugyeom, Frants
2016	Got7	"My Home"	Flight Log: Turbulence	Yes	earattack	Yes	earattack, Lish
2016	Got7	"If" (만약에)	Flight Log: Turbulence	Yes	Primeboi, BamBam	No	—N/a
2016	Got7	"Sick" (아파)	Flight Log: Turbulence	Yes	Ars (Youngjae), Jackson	No	—N/a
2016	Got7	"Let Me"	Flight Log: Turbulence	Yes	earattack	Yes	earattack, Lish
2017	Got7	"Shopping Mall"	Flight Log: Arrival	Yes	earattack (HeavyMental), Defsoul (JB), Jackson, BamBam	No	—N/a
2017	Got7	"Go Higher"	Flight Log: Arrival	Yes	earattack (HeavyMental), Defsoul (JB), Jackson, BamBam	No	—N/a
2017	Got7	"Face"	7 for 7	Yes	Lee Woomin 'collapsedone', Mayu Wakisaka, Jackson, BamBam	No	—N/a
2018	Got7	"2 (Two)"	The New Era	Yes	Jinyoung, Yugyeom, Distract, Secret Weapon, Samuelle Song	Yes	Jinyoung, Yugyeom, Distract, Secret Weapon
2018	Got7	"OMW"	Present: You	Yes	Jackson, Wizil, Boytoy	Yes	Jackson, Boytoy
2018	Got7	"Higher"	Present: You & Me	Yes	Jinyoung	No	—N/a
2018	Got7	"Think About It"	Present: You & Me	Yes	Defsoul (JB), Ars (Youngjae)	Yes	Defsoul (JB), Ars (Youngjae), Mirror Boy (220VOLT), Lee Sangchul
2018	Got7	"Nightmare" (Note: "Nightmare" was performed at Mnet Asian Music Awards 2018 and Got7 fifth anniversary fan meeting in January 2019)	Non-commercial single	Yes	Jackson, BamBam	No	—N/a
2020	Got7	"God Has Return + Mañana"	Dye	Yes	Jackson, BamBam	No	—N/a
2020	Mark Tuan	"Outta My Head"	Non-album single	Yes	Distract	Yes	Distract, Secret Weapon, Wang Tianfang
2020	Got7	"Born Ready"	Breath of Love: Last Piece	Yes	earattack	Yes	earattack, gong-do
2025	Got7	"Out the Door"	Winter Heptagon	Yes	Wesley Feng, Fletcher Milloy, Geoffrey Black, Timothy Tandiyo	Yes	Wesley Feng, Fletcher Milloy, Timothy Tandiyo, Geoffrey Black
2025	Got7	"Yours Truly", (우리가할수있는말은.)	Winter Heptagon	Yes	Got7	No	—N/a
2025	Mark Tuan	"Hold Still"	Silhouette	Yes	Jack Omstead, Nick Vyner	Yes	Jack Omstead, Nick Vyner
2025	Mark Tuan	"Pretty Little Picture"	Silhouette	Yes	Anthony Russo, Michael Christofi, Anthony Watts	Yes	Anthony Russo, Michael Christofi, Anthony Watts
2026	Mark Tuan	"Alone"	Non-album single	Yes	Jack Omstead, Noah Barer, Darius Coleman, Tone Stith	Yes	Jack Omstead, Noah Barer, Darius Coleman, Tone Stith

== Filmography ==
=== Dramas ===
Year	Title	Role	Note	Ref.
2012	Dream High 2	Back up dancer	Cameo (Episode 1)	
2015	Dream Knight	Himself	Korean-Chinese webseries by JYPE and Youku Tudou	
2016	Sanctuary	Himself	Thai short film	

=== Variety shows ===
Year	Title	Role	Note	Ref.
2013	WIN: Who is Next	Contestant	Rap and dance battle (Episode 4)	
2016	Battle Likes	MC	with BamBam (Episode 1–2)	
2017	Law of the Jungle	Cast member	in New Zealand (Episode 265–268)	
2017	I Can See Your Voice	Cast member	with BamBam, Youngjae, Yugyeom, Jinyoung, and Jay B	
2017	I Can See Your Voice Thailand	Cast member	with BamBam, Youngjae, and Yugyeom	
2019	Got7 Real Thai	Cast member	with BamBam, Youngjae, and Jinyoung	
2019	Got7 Golden Key	Cast member	with Youngjae	
2019	All For One (以团之名)	Special mentor		

== Music videos ==
Year	Title	Artist	Director	Notes	Ref.
2018	"OMW"	Got7	Naive Creative Production	Solo song for Present: You album	
2020	"Outta My Head"	Mark Tuan		Released on QQ Music	
2021	"One in a Million"	Mark Tuan (with Sanjoy Deb)		Animated music video	
2021	"Last Breath"	Mark Tuan	Will Chan	Mark Tuan listed as executive producer	
2022	"My Life"	Mark Tuan	Will Chan	Mark Tuan listed as executive producer	
2022	"Lonely"	Mark Tuan	Will Chan	Mark Tuan listed as executive producer	
2022	"Save Me"	Mark Tuan	Will Chan	Mark Tuan listed as executive producer	
2022	"IMYSM"	Mark Tuan	Will Chan		
2022	"Far Away"	Mark Tuan	Will Chan		
2023	"Everyone Else Fades"	Mark Tuan	Will Chan		
2023	"Your World"	Mark Tuan	Will Chan	Mark Tuan listed as executive producer	
2023	"Fallin'"	Mark Tuan	Alexander Chung		
2024	"Superpower"	Mark Tuan and Kiss of Life			
2025	"High As You"	Mark Tuan	Illumin		
2025	"Hold Still"	Mark Tuan	Will Chan, Mark Tuan		
2025	"Silhouette"	Mark Tuan	NOVV KIM		
2026	"Alone"	Mark Tuan	Yaohan Liang, Will Chan		
2026	"Nightlight"	Mark Tuan feat. Milli			

== Awards and nominations ==
Name of award ceremony, year presented, award category, nominee of award, and result of nomination
Award ceremony	Year	Category	Nominee(s)/work(s)	Result	Ref.
Bazaar Gala	2025	Overseas Attention-Grabbing Artist	Mark Tuan	Won	
Mint Awards	2026	Best Cover of the Year	Vol. 32	Nominated	
Seoul Music Awards	2024	Global Producer Award	Mark Tuan	Won	
Weibo Music Awards	2025	Recommended Song of the Year	"High As You"	Nominated	
Weibo Music Awards	2025	Recommended MV of the Year	"High As You"	Nominated	
Weibo Music Awards	2025	Recommended Person of the Year (Overseas Singer)	Mark Tuan	Won	
Weibo Music Awards	2026	Person of the Year (Overseas Singer)	Mark Tuan	Nominated	
Weibo Music Awards	2026	Concert of the Year	"Silhouette" Fancon	Nominated	
Weibo Night	2025	Weibo Performance Artist of the Year	Mark Tuan	Won	
Weibo Starlight Awards	2019	Hot Star Award	Mark Tuan	Won	
