= Park Jin-young =

South Korean singer and actor (born 1994)

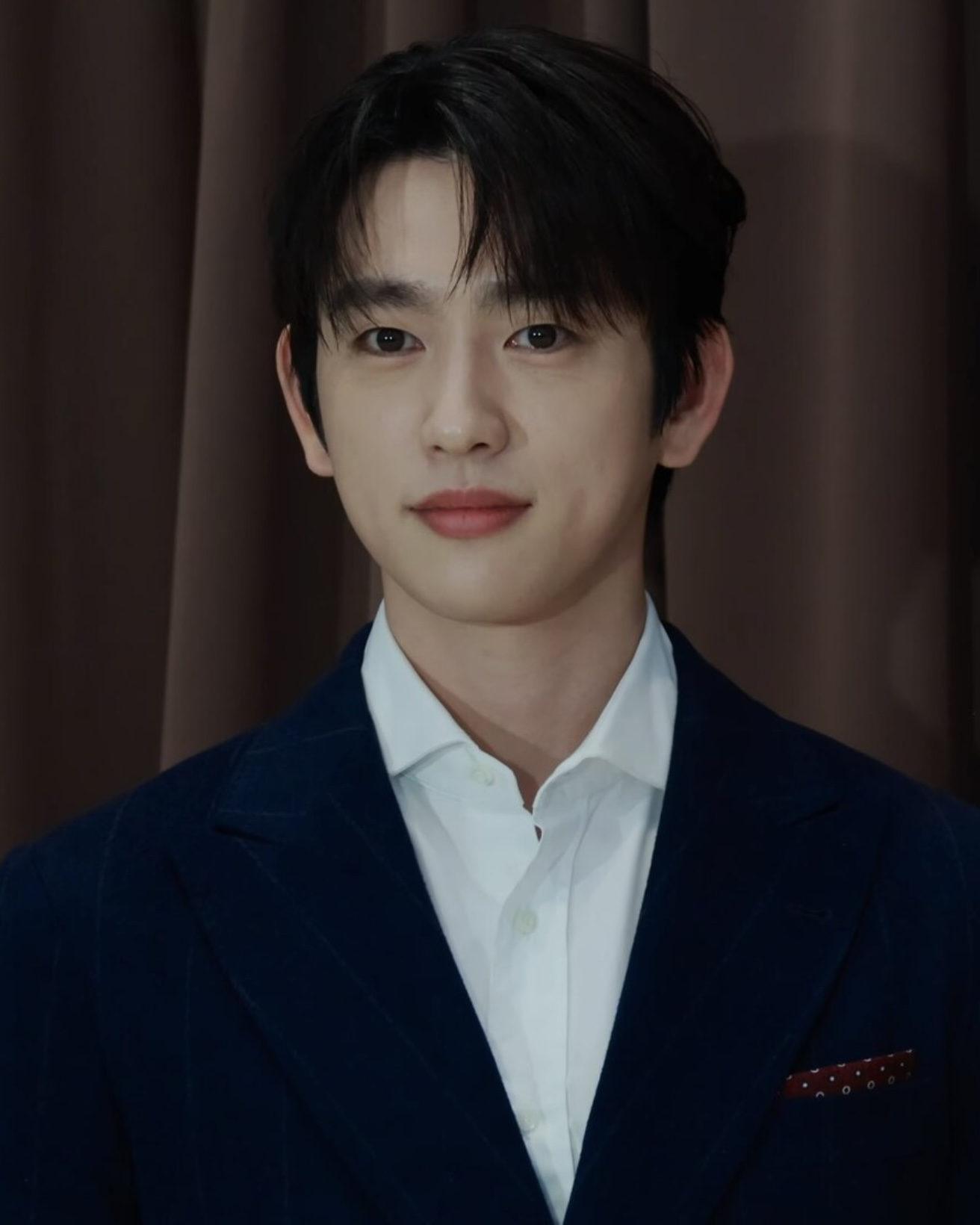
- Park in 2025
- Born: Park Jin-young; September 22, 1994 (age 32); Changwon, South Korea
- Other names: Junior; Jr.
- Education: Howon University
- Occupations: Singer; actor; songwriter
- Years active: 2012–present
- Agent: BH Entertainment
- Works: Filmography; discography
- Awards: Full list
- Musical career
- Genres: K-pop; J-pop; dance; R&B
- Instrument: Vocals
- Label: JYP
- Member of: Got7; JJ Project

Korean name
- Hangul: 박진영
- RR: Bak Jinyeong
- MR: Pak Chinyŏng
- Website: bhent.co.kr

Signature
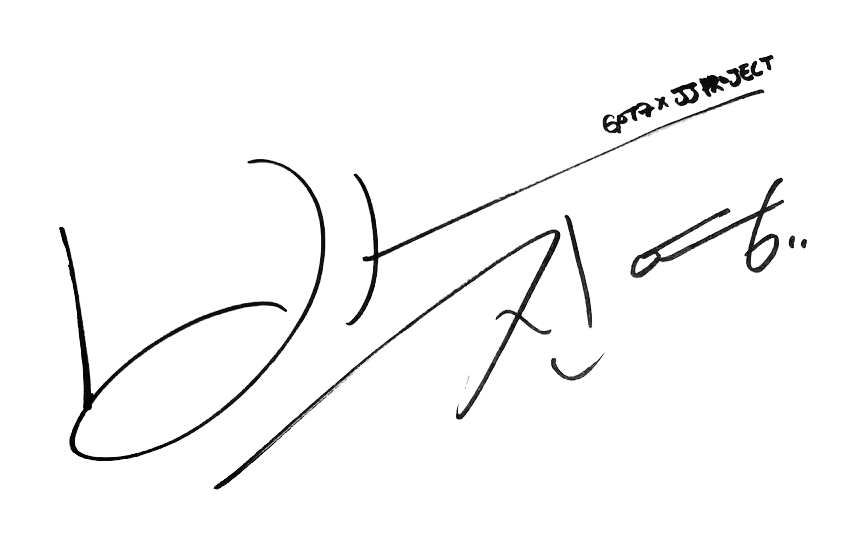

Park Jin-young (Korean: 박진영; born September 22, 1994), known mononymously as Jinyoung, and formerly as Jr. and Junior, is a South Korean singer, actor, and songwriter. He is a member of the South Korean boy band Got7 and duo JJ Project.

As an actor, he gained recognition for his roles in the television series The Devil Judge (2021), Yumi's Cells (2021–2022), and Our Unwritten Seoul (2025), for which he received a Best Actor nomination at the 62nd Baeksang Arts Awards. He has also starred in the films Christmas Carol (2022) and Hi-Five (2025). He won the Best New Actor award at the 59th Baeksang Arts Awards for Christmas Carol and received a Best New Actor nomination at the 46th Blue Dragon Film Awards for Hi-Five.

He is known for building his characters' emotions drawing from his personal experience rather than maximizing specific emotions or highlighting dramatic moments, and for conveying sorrow through a silent demeanor and deep, teary eyes.

== Early life and education ==
Park is a native of Udo Island in Jinhae District, Changwon, where his grandparents reside, but grew up in Yongwon-dong, Jinhae District.

He had childhood ambitions to be an entertainer and appear on TV since his fifth year of primary school. His mother was against it and, when Park was attending his sixth year, she sent him to an audition for SM Entertainment, agreeing that, if he failed, he would give up; however, he made it to the third and final preliminary round and won the popularity award. As the family's opposition diminished, he started taking dance classes at Busan Dance School in Seomyeon and Haeundae starting from the winter vacation of his first year of middle school, although he didn't take it seriously for the first three months until his father reproached him.

After three months of intense practice, he was able to dance, and in 2009 he successfully auditioned for JYP Entertainment, winning first place at the open audition with Jay B over 10,000 applicants; he subsequently moved to Seoul alone, in the middle of his first year of high school. At that time he only liked dancing, but, thinking seriously about his future, he realized that he loved music as a whole. He attended Gyeonggi High School and Howon University.

== Career ==
=== 2011–2014: Dream High 2, JJ Project and debut with Got7 ===
In 2011, after six months of acting classes, Park was cast in the role of Jung Ui-bong in the television drama Dream High 2. The drama began airing on January 30, 2012, on KBS. On February 29, he released the song "We Are The B" for the drama's soundtrack, along with Jinwoon, Kang So-ra and Kim Ji-soo.

In May 2012, Park and fellow trainee Jay B debuted as the duo JJ Project with the single album Bounce. On March 11, 2013, it was announced that he would be appearing as Ddol-yi on MBC's new drama When a Man Falls in Love, which aired for twenty episodes beginning April 3. On January 16, 2014, Park debuted as a vocalist in JYP Entertainment's new boy group Got7. Their first EP was released soon after on January 20 and Park made the choreography for one of the songs, "Follow Me".

=== 2015–2017: Hosting and acting roles ===
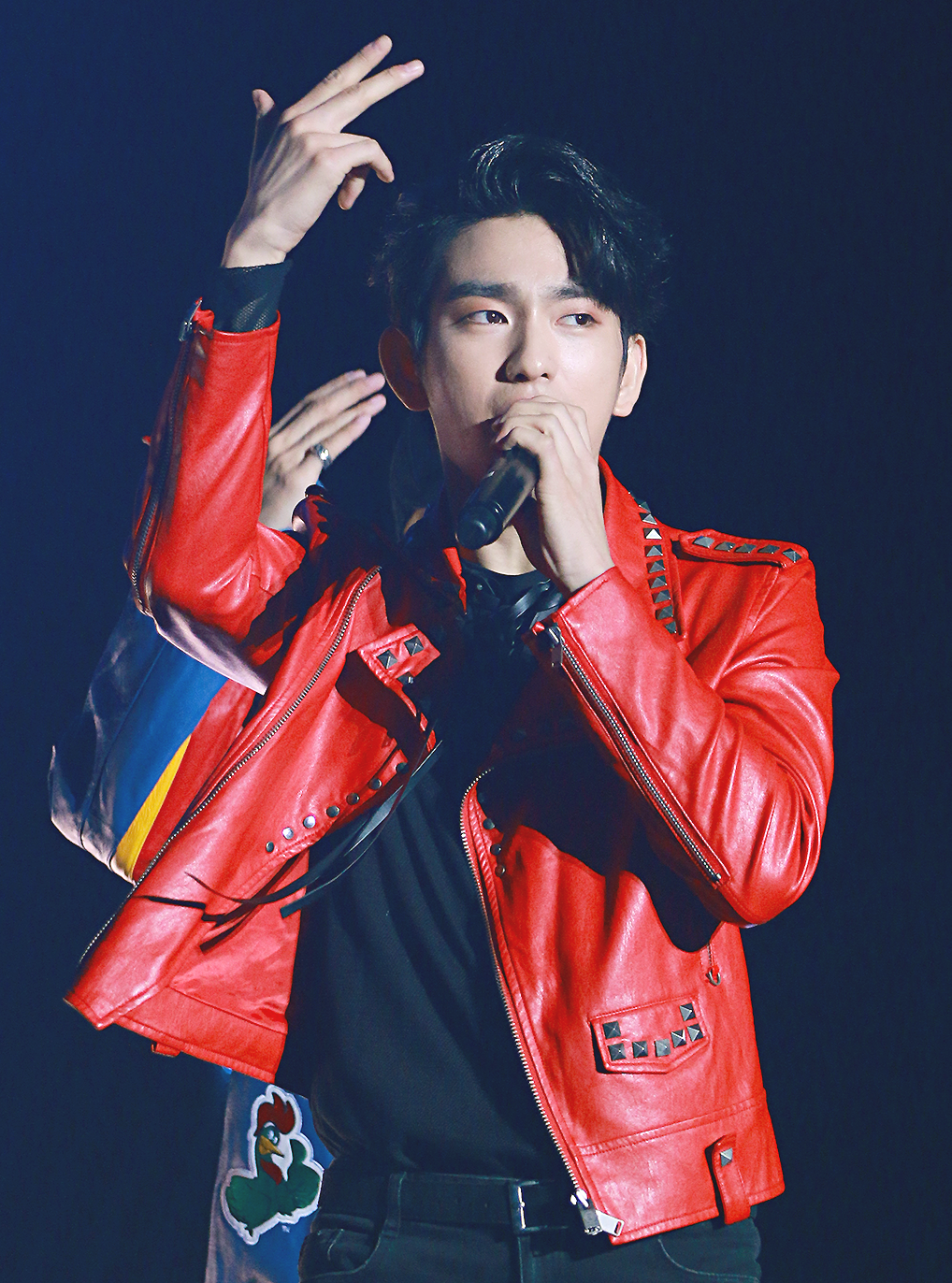
Park performing at SGC Super Live in 2016

In 2015, Park was cast in a supporting role in the drama This is My Love, which aired on JTBC from May 29 to July 18. His portrayal of the male lead's younger counterpart caught attention and he received favorable reviews for his natural acting of a teenage boy. His stable performance showcasing the typical bluntness, rough rebellion, and subtle excitement of a teen's first love was deemed unbecoming of a rookie and was noted to be completely different from Got7's soft boyfriend image. Although the previous roles hadn't sparked his interest in acting, while filming This is My Love Park realized that it was actually fun, and the memories of that time prompted him to continue working as an actor. The same year in March he was hired as official host for M Countdown alongside Shinee's Key, group member BamBam and CNBLUE's Jung-shin. Park left his position as MC in March 2016 to focus on activities with Got7, including the group's first worldwide concert tour.

In 2016, Park was cast as the male lead in the independent film A Stray Goat, directed by Cho Jae-min: in the film, he played a high school student who moves to the town of Goseong where he meets a girl, who is an outcast because of rumors and suspicions about her father. The film was theatrically released on March 1, 2017, and premiered at the 17th Jeonju International Film Festival. In September 2016, he was cast for a supporting role in the drama The Legend of the Blue Sea, where he portrayed the teenage version of Lee Min-ho's character, the male lead of the series. In February 2017, SBS announced Park, NCT's Doyoung, and Blackpink's Jisoo as the new fixed MCs of Inkigayo.

=== 2018–2020: Transition to leading roles ===
In December 2018, Park landed his first lead role in the fantasy rom-com drama He Is Psychometric alongside Kim Kwon, Kim Da-som and Shin Ye-eun, receiving favorable reviews from viewers for his rough action scenes and heartbreaking tearful acting. Producer Kim Byung-soo stated that he had struggled five years to find the right guy in his early twenties to play Lee Ahn, and that Park caught his eye through This is My Love while he was looking for new faces. In 2020, Park starred in the television series When My Love Blooms alongside Yoo Ji-tae, Lee Bo-young and Jeon So-nee, and was cast in the film Yaksha: Ruthless Operations as the youngest member of a team of spies in foreign countries dedicated to overseas missions.

In August, he was confirmed as the main lead in the tvN legal drama The Devil Judge alongside Ji Sung as associate judge Kim Ga-on. Park auditioned for the role due to a fascination for Kim Ga-on's gradual change over the course of the series. Writer Moon Yoo-seok later shared that he had cast him for his defiant gaze and that, upon learning of Park's commitment to studying the role, he thought that he had found the perfect Ga-on, "sincere, competent and eager, but with an indistinct sense of resignation and anger". The drama premiered in July 2021, and Bryan Tan of Yahoo Lifestyle Singapore praised Park by writing, "[he] has been spectacularly pleasurable to watch. The young actor is extremely authentic in his portrayal of the tortured and righteous associate judge Kim Ga-on, and his ambiguous romantic feelings towards his friend Yoon Soo-hyun adds flavour to the side plot, and his presence adds a lighter and youthful dimension in contrast to Kang Yo-han's direct and merciless methods". In a 2026 interview with W Korea, Park spoke of The Devil Judge as a turning point in his career that prompted him to take acting more seriously than before.

=== 2021–2024: Departure from JYPE and solo activities ===
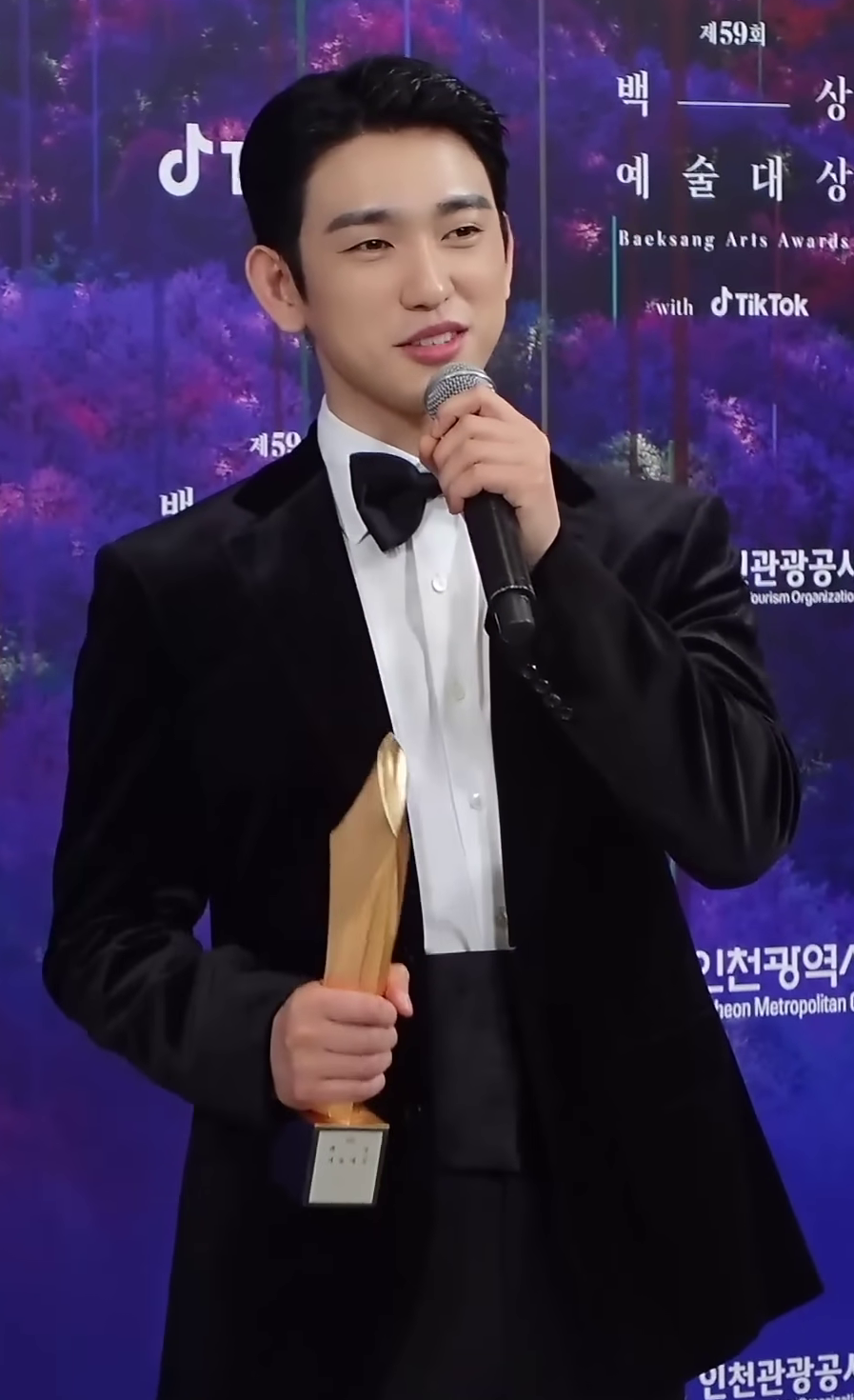
Park at the 59th Baeksang Arts Awards, April 2023

In January 2021, Park, along with the other six members of Got7, chose not to renew his contract with JYP Entertainment. On January 28 it was announced that he signed an exclusive contract with BH Entertainment. On July 22, 2021, he was confirmed to appear in the tvN drama Yumi's Cells as Yoo Ba-bi alongside Kim Go-eun. The series, based on the webtoon of the same title, premiered the following September. On July 29, 2021, Park released the self-written, self-composed digital single "Dive" as a gift for fans, along with a special performance clip published on 1theK Originals official YouTube channel. The song, based on the sound of the bands, debuted on Billboard World Digital Song Sales Chart at number 12. In September, he starred in New York Fashion Week's digital fashion short film, Concept Korea New York S/S 2022, for Nohant, a unisex casual brand based in Seoul. The film was released through the New York Fashion Week official website and the Korea Creative Content Agency official YouTube channel.

On September 29, 2021, he released "Dive (Japanese ver.)". The following month, Park was confirmed to star as the lead in the crime thriller film Christmas Carol, based on the novel of the same name, about a guy who goes to a juvenile detention center to avenge his twin brother's death. The film, which was selected by the Busan Asian Project Market (APM), began filming in February 2022. Released on December 7, 2022, the film earned Park the Best New Actor – Film Award and the Most Popular Actor Award at the 59th Baeksang Arts Awards. Park received praise for the bold change of image and his performance in the film, which was defined as "unparalleled" by Jo Jae-yong of Single List. Other journalists and critics noted how he was able to express numerous different emotions with a single glance.

In the summer of 2022, Park reprised his role in the second season of Yumi's Cells, for which he released the OST "Shining on Your Night". In December, he featured in a 100-page special edition of TMRW magazine. In March 2022, he starred in a three-part cinematic advertisement for the virtual game KlayCity. In November 2022, BH Entertainment announced that Park would be releasing a solo album in January 2023 to commemorate the 10th anniversary of his debut. The extended play, titled Chapter 0: With, was released on January 18, 2023. On May 8, 2023 he enlisted as an active duty soldier. He served in the 11th Maneuver Division of the Republic of Korea Army and was discharged on November 7, 2024.

=== 2025–present: Post-military return and acting career ===
After completing his military service, in early 2025, Park joined Got7 to commemorate their eleventh anniversary with the release of the extended play Winter Heptagon, for which he co-wrote the song "Her". Between February and March 2025, he starred in Channel A's mystery romance The Witch, which was filmed before his enlistment. His portrayal of data miner Lee Dong-jin earned praise both from viewers and critics, who highlighted his portrayal of the character's emotional depth and determination to save another person. Kim Seo-hyun of 100 News wrote: "Park Jin-young worked his magic to make even Dong-jin's clumsy and immature appearance into a character that we can empathize with".

In the same year, Park appeared in the tvN series Our Unwritten Seoul opposite Park Bo-young, for which he received a Best Actor nomination at the 62nd Baeksang Arts Awards. He also appeared in the feature film Hi-Five. To play the role of a cult leader in the latter, he referred to Hannibal Lecter in The Silence of the Lambs, rewatching the film several times. He was praised for his stable acting and his command of the screen, with media describing his performance as "incredibly compelling". The role earned him a Best New Actor nomination at the 46th Blue Dragon Film Awards.

In 2026, he starred in JTBC's coming-of-age melodrama series Still Shining opposite Kim Min-ju. His performance was praised for combining both the clumsy yet fresh and pure emotions of first love, and the longing and sadness for losing his parents. On May 13, he released his second EP Said & Done, with the lead single "Everlove".

In October, Park starred in tvN's period spy romance television series 100 Days of Deception, portraying Sato Hideo (Kim Tae-woong), an elite interpreter for the Government-General of Chōsen and the adopted son of Sato Shinichi. The series premiered on October 10, 2026.

== Other activities ==
=== Endorsements ===
Throughout 2020, Park collaborated with Tom Ford Beauty to promote Rose Prick Eau de Parfum, make-up line Shade and Illuminate, and the unisex perfume collection Private Blend. Rose Prick Eau de Parfum was sold out in a day. On October 10, 2025, Dentiste, an oral care brand, announced that it had selected him as its newest model for a campaign carrying the message 'Happy New Breath'. The company explained that it chose him for his bright and refreshing charm and healthy, sophisticated image, which fit the brand. In June 2026, Park was appointed as the global brand ambassador for South Korean skincare brand Deoproce.

=== Philanthropy ===
In February 2020, it was reported that Park had donated an undisclosed amount of money to wild animals affected by fires in Australia. In August 2020, he donated ₩20 million to the Hope Bridge Disaster Relief Association to help flood victims in South Korea. On August 10, 2022, Park donated ₩30 million to help those affected by the 2022 South Korean floods through the Hope Bridge Korea Disaster Relief Association. In December, he donated ₩50 million to One Love Village, a facility for children with severe disabilities. On February 9, 2023, Park donated ₩30 million through Save the Children for the victims of the 2023 Turkey–Syria earthquakes, especially children, becoming a member of the Honors Club of the organization.

On March 26, 2025, the Hope Bridge Korea Disaster Relief Association announced that he had donated ₩50 million for wildfire relief and firefighter support, thus joining its Honors Club for achieving a cumulative donation of ₩100 million won. On April 2, he donated ₩30 million won to Save the Children to help children and families affected by the 2025 Myanmar earthquake. On September 22, Park made a second donation to the NGO for his birthday, donating ₩100 million (US$74,611.5) to provide meals and kitchen facilities to children from low-income families. On May 13, 2026, he made a third donation to the NGO to commemorate the release of his solo mini album Said & Done, donating ₩50 million (US$37,305.75) to support overseas children's music education.

== Discography ==
=== Extended plays ===
List of extended plays, with selected chart positions and sales figures
Title	EP details	Peak chart positions	Sales
Title	EP details	KOR	Sales
Chapter 0: With	Released: January 18, 2023; Label: BH Entertainment; Formats: CD, digital download, streaming	9	KOR: 48,932
Said & Done	Released: May 13, 2026; Label: BH Entertainment; Formats: CD, digital download, streaming	13	KOR: 50,828

=== Singles ===
Title	Year	Peak chart positions		Sales (DL)	Album
Title	Year	KOR	US World	Sales (DL)	Album
As lead artist
"Dive"	2021	— (Note: "Dive" did not enter the Gaon Digital Chart, but appeared at number 54 on the component Download chart.)	12	—N/a	Non-album singles
"Dive (Japanese ver.)"	2021	—	—	—N/a	Non-album singles
"Cotton Candy"	2023	—	—	—N/a	Chapter 0: With
"Christmas Fever"	2025	—	—	—N/a	Non-album single
"Everlove"	2026	— (Note: "Everlove" did not enter the Circle Digital Chart, but appeared at number 45 on the component Download chart.)	—	—N/a	Said & Done
Soundtrack appearances
"We Are the B" (B급 인생) (with Kang So-ra, 2AM's Jeong Jinwoon and Kim Ji-soo)	2012	13	—	KOR: 600,203	Dream High 2 OST
"Hold Me" (이렇게)	2018	—	—	—N/a	Top Management OST
"Shining on Your Night" (달이 될게)	2022	— (Note: "Shining on Your Night" did not enter the Gaon Digital Chart, but appeared at number 60 on the component Download chart.)	—	—N/a	Yumi's Cells 2 OST
"You Can Be Loved" (with Baek A-yeon) (Note: "You Can Be Loved" wasn't released commercially; it got an official music video and was only featured in the film.)	2022	—	—	—N/a	Princess Aya OST
Other charted songs
"One-Sided Love" (외사랑) (featuring Choi Yu-ree)	2026	69	—	—N/a	Said & Done
"—" denotes releases that did not chart or were not released in that region.

=== Songwriting credits ===
All song credits are adapted from the Korea Music Copyright Association's database, unless otherwise noted.

Year	Artist	Title	Album	Lyrics		Music	
Year	Artist	Title	Album	Credited	With	Credited	With
2012	JJ Project	"Na Na Na" (Ver. MM Choice) (나나나) (with Kim Se-hwang, Robin, DJ Lip2Shot)	MM Choice Part. 2	Yes	JB, San E	No	—N/a
2015	Got7	"To Star" (이.별)	Mad: Winter Edition	Yes	—N/a	No	—N/a
2016	Got7	"Can't" (못하겠어)	Flight Log: Departure	Yes	Mark	Yes	Distract, Secret Weapon
2016	Got7	"Mayday"	Flight Log: Turbulence	Yes	—N/a	Yes	Distract
2017	Got7	"Paradise"	Flight Log: Arrival	Yes	BamBam, Distract	Yes	Distract, Secret Weapon
2017	Got7	"Firework"	7 for 7	Yes	Distract	Yes	Distract, Secret Weapon
2017	JJ Project	"Coming Home"	Verse 2	Yes	Distract	Yes	Distract, Secret Weapon
2017	JJ Project	"Tomorrow, Today" (내일, 오늘)	Verse 2	Yes	Defsoul, J.Y. Park "The Asiansoul"	No	—N/a
2017	JJ Project	"On & On"	Verse 2	Yes	Mr. Cho, Defsoul	Yes	Mr. Cho, Defsoul, Cheongdam-dong Gun-woo
2017	JJ Project	"Don't Wanna Know"	Verse 2	Yes	Defsoul	No	—N/a
2017	JJ Project	"The Day" (그날)	Verse 2	Yes	Jukjae, Ju Daekwan (MonoTree)	No	—N/a
2018	Got7	"Thank You"	Eyes On You	Yes	—N/a	Yes	Stephen Langstaff, Charlie Tenku, Matthew Weedon, Distract
2018	Got7	"2 (Two)"	The New Era	Yes	Mark, Yugyeom, Distract, Secret Weapon, Samuelle Soung	Yes	Mark, Yugyeom, Distract, Secret Weapon
2018	Got7	"I Am Me"	Present: You	Yes	Distract	Yes	Distract, Ludwig Lindell
2018	Got7	"My Youth"	Present: You	Yes	Distract	Yes	Distract, Tobias Karlsson, Sangmi Kim
2018	Got7	"Higher"	Present: You & Me	Yes	Mark	Yes	Distract, Secret Weapon
2018	Got7	"King"	Present: You & Me	Yes	BamBam	Yes	BamBam. Frants
2019	Got7	"25"	I Won't Let You Go	Yes	Yugyeom, Distract, Cosho	Yes	Yugyeom, Distract, Secret Weapon
2019	Got7	"Zero"	I Won't Let You Go	Yes	Cosho	Yes	Distract, Secret Weapon
2019	Got7	"The End" (끝)	Spinning Top: Between Security & Insecurity	Yes	—N/a	Yes	Distract, Secret Weapon
2019	Got7	"Run Away"	Call My Name	Yes	Vendors, Ruy Da-som	No	—N/a
2020	Got7	"Love You Better"	Dye	Yes	Jo Mi-yang, room102	No	—N/a
2020	Got7	"Wave"	Breath of Love: Last Piece	Yes	Distract	Yes	Distract, Ludwig Lindell
2021	Got7	"Encore"	Non-album singles	Yes	—N/a	Yes	Trippy
2021	Park Jin-young	"Dive"	Non-album singles	Yes	—N/a	Yes	Choi Joon, Ludwig Lindell
2022	Got7	"Don't Care About Me"	Got7	Yes	Yugyeom	Yes	Yugyeom, Distract, Ludwig Lindell
2023	Park Jin-young	"Animal"	Chapter 0: With	Yes	—N/a	Yes	Distract, Brian Cho
2023	Park Jin-young	"Cotton Candy"	Chapter 0: With	Yes	Distract, Ludwig Lindell	Yes	Distract, Ludwig Lindell
2023	Park Jin-young	"Our Miracle" (너를만남이란기적)	Chapter 0: With	Yes	—N/a	Yes	Distract, Secret Weapon
2023	Park Jin-young	"Sleep Well" (잘자)	Chapter 0: With	Yes	Distract, Ludwig Lindell	Yes	Distract, Ludwig Lindell
2023	Park Jin-young	"Letter" (편지)	Chapter 0: With	Yes	—N/a	No	—N/a
2025	Got7	"Her"	Winter Heptagon	Yes	—N/a	Yes	Distract, 82oom (Papermaker), Noah (Papermaker)
2025	Got7	"Yours Truly", (우리가할수있는말은.)	Winter Heptagon	Yes	Got7	No	—N/a
2025	Park Jin-young	"Christmas Fever"	Non-album single	Yes	Lee Hyung-seok (PNP), Chaz Jackson, Infinity	No	—N/a
2026	Park Jin-young	"Everlove"	Said & Done	Yes	Lee Hyung-seok (PNP), Park Da-hye, David Amber (153/Joombas), Edwin Honoret, Grant "YOG$" Yarber, Grant Sayler	No	—N/a
2026	Park Jin-young	"Seventeen" (열일곱) (with Wonpil (Day6))	Said & Done	Yes	Wonpil	No	—N/a

== Tours ==
=== 2026–27 Park Jinyoung 1st Concert Tour [CODE#] ===
Tour dates
Date	City	Country	Venue	No. of Shows
November 7, 2026	Seoul	South Korea	Jangchung Gymnasium	1
November 8, 2026	Seoul	South Korea	Jangchung Gymnasium	1
November 15, 2026	Osaka	Japan	Zepp Osaka Bayside	1
December 5, 2026	Manila	Philippines	FYM Hall, EVM Convention Center	1
December 20, 2026	Tokyo	Japan	Zepp DiverCity	1
December 26, 2026	Taipei	Taiwan	Taipei International Convention Center	1
January 9, 2027	Bangkok	Thailand	Impact Arena	1
January 10, 2027	Bangkok	Thailand	Impact Arena	1
January 23, 2027	Macau	China	TBA	1
Total Shows				9

== Filmography ==
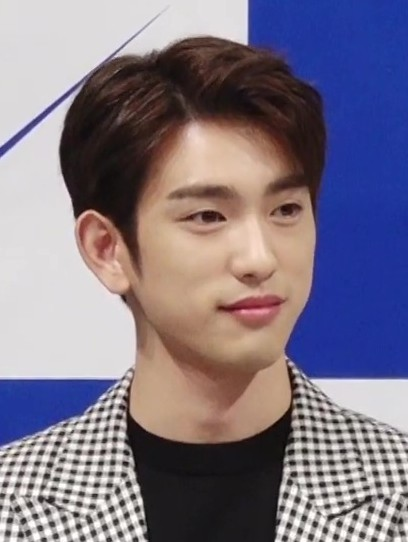
Park at the He Is Psychometric (2019) press conference, his first leading role

Selected filmography

- He Is Psychometric (2019)
- The Devil Judge (2021)
- Yumi's Cells (2021–2022)
- Christmas Carol (2022)
- Hi-Five (2025)
- Our Unwritten Seoul (2025)
- 100 Days of Deception (2026)

== Accolades ==
=== Awards and nominations ===
Name of the award ceremony, year presented, category, nominee or work, and result
Award	Year	Category	Nominee / Work	Result	Ref.
APAN Star Awards	2022	Best Couple	Park Jin-young with Kim Go-eun; Yumi's Cells	Nominated	
Asia Artist Awards	2020	Potential Award (Actor)	Park Jin-young	Won	
Asia Artist Awards	2020	Popularity Award (Actor)	Park Jin-young	Won	
Asia Artist Awards	2023	Popularity Award (Actor)	Park Jin-young	Nominated	
Asia Artist Awards	2024	Popularity Award (Actor)	Park Jin-young	Nominated	
Baeksang Arts Awards	2017	Most Popular – Actor (Film)	A Stray Goat	Nominated	
Baeksang Arts Awards	2023	Best New Actor – Film	Christmas Carol	Won	
Baeksang Arts Awards	2023	Most Popular Actor	Park Jin-young	Won	
Baeksang Arts Awards	2026	Best Actor – Television	Our Unwritten Seoul	Nominated	
Blue Dragon Film Awards	2025	Best New Actor	Hi-Five	Nominated	
Blue Dragon Film Awards	2025	Popular Star Award	Park Jin-young	Won	
Brand of the Year Awards	2025	Male Idol Actor of the Year	Park Jin-young	Won	
Buil Film Awards	2025	Star of the Year	Park Jin-young	Nominated	
Fundex Awards	2025	Popular Star Prize (Male)	Park Jin-young	Nominated	
iMBC Awards	2025	Best Male Actor	Park Jin-young	Nominated	
KM Chart Awards	2026	Best Popular Solo Male Award	Park Jin-young	Nominated	
Korean Association of Film Critics Awards	2023	Best New Actor	Christmas Carol	Won	
StarHub Night of Stars	2019	Favourite Korean Drama Male Character	He Is Psychometric	Won	
Wildflower Film Awards	2023	Best New Actor Award	Christmas Carol	Nominated	

=== Listicles ===
Name of publisher, year listed, name of listicle, and placement
Publisher	Year	Listicle	Placement	Ref.
Max Movie	2017	11 Rising Stars of 2017	Included	
Cine21	2024	Korean Film NEXT 50 – Actors	Included	

== Bibliography ==
=== Photobooks ===
- Hey Guys, JYP Entertainment and Copan Global (2019), UPC 8809686161287
- Hear, Here, JYP Entertainment and Copan Global (2020), UPC 8809686168118
