= Said & Done =

Said & Done may refer to:

- "Said & Done", song by Gotthard from their album Lipservice
- Said & Done (EP), 2026 extended play by Park Jin-young
