= Silhouette (disambiguation) =

A silhouette is the image of a person, animal, object or scene represented as a solid shape of a single color, usually black, with its edges matching the outline of the subject.

Silhouette or Silhouettes may also refer to:

== People ==
- Étienne de Silhouette (1709–1767), Controller-General of Finances under Louis XV

== Arts, entertainment and media ==
=== Fictional characters ===
- Silhouette (comics), a Marvel Comic heroine
- Silhouette, a character in the Watchmen series
- Aunt Silhouette, a character introduced in Book Index 57, page 8 of 9, of Margaret Atwood's novel The Testaments (2019)

=== Music ===
==== Groups and labels ====
- Silhouette (band), a Dutch progressive rock band
- Silhouette, an alias used briefly in the mid-1980s by American singer Jeanie Tracy
- The Silhouettes, an American R&B/doo-wop group

==== Albums ====
- Silhouette (album), 1988, by jazz musician Kenny G
- Silhouettes (Aquilo album), 2017
- Silhouettes (Klaus Schulze album), 2018
- Silhouettes (Lonnie Liston Smith album), 1984
- Silhouettes (Textures album), 2008
- The Silhouette (album), 2007, by metal band Ava Inferi
- Silhouette (Mark Tuan EP), 2025

==== Songs ====
- Silhouette (Kenny G instrumental), 1988
- "Silhouette", by Aquilo from their 2017 album Silhouettes
- "Silhouette" (Kana-Boon song), 2014
- "Silhouette", by Nation of Language from their 2025 album Dance Called Memory
- "Silhouette", By Mike Oldfield from his 2008 album Music of the Spheres
- "Silhouette", by Opeth from their 1995 album Orchid
- "Silhouette", by Owl City from their 2012 album The Midsummer Station
- "Silhouette", by Periphery from their 2023 album Periphery V: Djent Is Not a Genre
- "Silhouette", by Thrice from their 2003 album The Artist in the Ambulance
- "Silhouettes" (Avicii song), 2012
- "Silhouettes" (Marmaduke Duke song), 2009
- "Silhouettes" (The Rays song), 1957, covered by Steve Gibson & the Red Caps, Herman's Hermits and others
- "Silhouettes", by Of Monsters and Men on The Hunger Games: Catching Fire – Original Motion Picture Soundtrack
- "Silhouettes", by Smile Empty Soul from their 2003 self titled album
- "Silhouettes", by Swallow the Sun from their 2015 album Songs from the North I, II & III
- "Silhouettes", by Warbringer from their 2017 album Woe to the Vanquished

=== Other uses in arts, entertainment, and media ===
- Silhouette RPG, a generic role-playing game system
- The Silhouette (newspaper), the student newspaper of McMaster University in Hamilton, Ontario, Canada

== Transport ==
- Silhouette (boat), a trailerable sailboat
- Silhouette (show rod), a show car built by Bill Cushenbery
- Celebrity Silhouette, a cruise ship
- Lamborghini Silhouette, a sports car
- Oldsmobile Silhouette, a minivan

== Other uses ==
- Silhouette racing car
- Silhouette (clustering), a method used in cluster analysis
- Silhouette (eyewear), an Austrian brand of sunglasses and eyeglasses
- Silhouette (lingerie), an English manufacturer of women's lingerie
- Silhouette Island, in the Seychelles
- Clipping path, for clip silhouettes.
