= 100 Days of Deception =

2026 South Korean television series

- Promotional poster
- Hangul: 100일의 거짓말
- Lit.: 100 Days of Lies
- RR: 100irui geojinmal
- MR: 100irŭi kŏjinmal
- Genre: Historical; Spy; Romance; Action
- Written by: Ryu Bo-ri
- Directed by: Yoo In-shik; Kim Yoon-jin
- Starring: Kim You-jung; Park Jin-young; Kim Hyun-joo; Lee Moo-saeng; Jin Seon-kyu
- Music by: Kim Tae-seong; Choi Jung-in
- Country of origin: South Korea
- Original languages: Korean; Japanese; English
- No. of episodes: 14 + 1 special

Production
- Executive producers: Kwon Byung-wook; Jang Shin-ae
- Producers: Jang Kyung-ik; Yoo Sang-won; Lee Sang-min
- Cinematography: Hwang Min-sik; Lee Seong-hee; Wang Ho-sang; Kim Ji-hoon
- Running time: 70 minutes
- Production companies: Studio Dragon; Nangman Crew

Original release
- Network: tvN
- Release: October 10, 2026 – present

100 Days of Deception (Korean: 100일의 거짓말) is an ongoing South Korean television series written by Ryu Bo-ri and directed by Yoo In-shik and Kim Yoon-jin, as a special project commemorating the 20th anniversary of tvN. The series stars Kim You-jung, Park Jin-young, Kim Hyun-joo, Lee Moo-saeng, and Jin Seon-kyu. Set in 1932 Gyeongseong (present-day Seoul) during the Japanese colonial period, it premiered on tvN on October 10, 2026, and airs every Saturday and Sunday at 21:10 (KST). It is also available for streaming on TVING in South Korea and Netflix globally.

== Synopsis ==
Gyeongseong's most skilled pickpocket and con artist, Lee Ga-kyung, dreams of earning enough to escape Chōsen and start a new life in the United States. In earlier days, she sees no future staying in Chōsen and contemplates suicide, but gives up after seeing construction news of the Empire State Building. She agrees to go undercover as an interpreter at the Japanese Government-General of Korea for 100 days on behalf of the independence movement, hoping the organization can help her make her dream of moving to America a reality, while Immigration Act of 1924 is in force. There, she crosses paths with Sato Hideo, also known as Kim Tae-woong, an elite interpreter and the adopted son of Inspector-General Sato Shinichi. As the two become entangled in secrets and hidden loyalties within the colonial government, their lives intersect amid espionage, danger, and the growing struggle for Korean independence.

== Cast and characters ==
=== Main ===
- Kim You-jung as Lee Ga-kyung / Geum Seo-hee
  - Han Si-a as young Lee Ga-kyung
  - Cha Tae-rin as young child Lee Ga-kyung

A skilled pickpocket in Gyeongseong who dreams of going to America. While saving money to achieve her goal, she accepts an offer from the anti-Japanese Korean independence movement Gugukdan and becomes a spy, infiltrating the Government-General of Korea disguised as an interpreter for 100 days.

- Park Jin-young as Sato Hideo / Kim Tae-woong
  - Park Hoo as young Kim Tae-woong

The adopted son of Sato Shinichi and a newly appointed elite interpreter for the Government-General of Korea. Fluent in English, Japanese, and Korean, he returns to Korea after more than 10 years abroad and takes on an important role as an interpreter.

- Kim Hyun-joo as Yoo So-ran

A sniper for the anti-Japanese independence group Gugukdan who takes up arms in pursuit of revenge. Previously involved with Sato Shinichi, she returns to Korea after more than a decade under a new identity as a Chinese woman and marries Korean-American journalist Yoo Phillip for convenience. During an assassination attempt on Sato, she presents Lee Ga-kyung with a dangerous, life-threatening deal. Her solution for Lee turns out to be for the latter to become a nanny for an American missionary for 30 days upon arrival in San Francisco, but Lee has to figure out the rest herself, included staying illegally.

- Lee Moo-saeng as Yoo Phillip

A Korean-American and correspondent for an American media company stationed in Gyeongseong. As a member of Gugukdan maintaining a marriage of convenience with Yoo So-ran, he uses his journalist position and knowledge of international affairs to put pressure on the Political Chief of the Government-General by citing reporting on Jeam-ri massacre from Albert Wilder Taylor and upcoming visit from League of Nations.

- Jin Seon-kyu as Sato Shinichi

The newly appointed Inspector-General of Korea and adoptive father of Sato Hideo. An ambitious man willing to do anything for success and advancement, he becomes the primary target of Gugukdan. He was formerly known as Ishikawa Nobuyuki before taking the surname Sato through his later marriage into the Sato family.

=== Supporting ===
Sato household

- Seo Jeong-yeon as Ryu Gwan-sil / Yanagi

A Korean housekeeper who has worked for the Sato family for many years. She helps Hideo retain his Korean language and is one of the few people who remembers his mother.

- Oi Kiko as Sato Hanako

Sato Shinichi's daughter and Hideo's younger sister. She has used a wheelchair since birth and is particularly close to Hideo. After returning to Gyeongseong, she becomes curious about her Korean mother, whom her father told her had died giving birth to her.

Gugukdan

- Park Jung-yeon as Kim Myeong-nam

The only daughter of Kim Seung-eok, the president of Joil Textile, and a prominent pro-Japanese collaborator. She secretly loves Lee Yeong-bok and becomes involved with the Gugukdan after following him. She secretly sells jewelry given to her by her father to help fund the organization.

- Lee Seon as Lee Yeong-bok

The secretary of Kim Seung-eok at Joil Textile and a member of the Gugukdan. Born into a family that had served the Kim family for generations, he became Seung-eok's secretary because of his intelligence. He secretly diverts company funds to support the independence movement and harbors feelings for Myeong-nam.

- Kim In-kwon as Han Cheol-ryong

One of the senior members of the Gugukdan. After being arrested and imprisoned during an earlier operation, he went to the organization's headquarters in Shanghai and has recently returned to Gyeongseong. He remains unmarried, claiming that he will not marry until Korea gains independence.

- Choi Deok-moon as Gwak Un-hak

A longtime member of the Gugukdan and an associate of Han Cheol-ryong. He works as a traditional Korean medicine healthcare provider at Hanseong Korean Medicine Clinic in Jongno, where most of his patients are poor Koreans who cannot afford treatment.

- Lee Do-gun as Jang Jeong-yeop

A member of the Gugukdan who works as Gwak Un-hak's assistant at Hanseong Korean Medicine Clinic. Married with three children and expecting a fourth, he keeps his involvement in the independence movement secret from his family because he does not want to worry them.

- Jeon Seok-chan as Kim Chi-geon

A physician at the hospital affiliated with Keijō Imperial University. After witnessing students from Severance Medical College suffer for participating in the March 1 Movement, he becomes involved in the independence movement.

- Go Se-bin as Hwang Gyu-yeong

A nurse at the hospital affiliated with Keijō Imperial University. Inspired by nurse Park Ja-hye, who joined the independence movement after witnessing the March 1 Movement, she hopes to work in a hospital serving Koreans after independence.

- Jeon Yung-beop as Song Jeon

A Japanese member who became involved in the Korean independence movement after witnessing the treatment of Koreans in Japan. After Yoo So-ran sees his death, she calls him a dongji.

- Kim Dong-young as Park Se-hwan

A Korean-born member who grew up in Japan.

Government-General

- Kim Joong-hee as Fukuda

The director of the Police Bureau of the Governor-General of Chōsen. He previously served as a high-ranking police officer at the Jongno Police Station alongside Sato Shinichi, whom he met during his military service. After Sato returns to Gyeongseong, Fukuda pledges his loyalty to him.

- Kim Do-hyun as Suzuki Hiroyuki / Hong Seok-won

An English interpreter for the Governor-General of Chōsen and Hideo's superior. Trusted by Sato, he manages foreign affairs at a time when diplomacy is important. He speaks English, Japanese, and Korean.

- Kouri Yuka as Yamada

Sato Shinichi's secretary. Originally from Tokyo, she obtains her position through her uncle, a senior official in the Government-General's Interior Affairs department. She is somewhat naive and clumsy, has a strong interest in fashion, and becomes shy around Hideo after falling for him at first sight.

- Kim Seung-rak as the Governor-General of Chōsen

Gyodang-ri

- Hong Sa-bin as Lee No-ma

A rickshaw driver who lives with Ga-kyung in the shantytown and works with her as a pickpocket. He became an orphan after his parents died during the March 1 Movement. He is strong and fast but is illiterate and has no shame about it.

- Kim Ra-hee as Bang Kkot-nim

A resident of the Gyodang-ri shantytown who lives with Ga-kyung and No-ma. She lost her parents during an epidemic and became unable to walk. After No-ma took her in, she came to regard him as an older brother.

- Lee Seok as Ma Mun-mak

A thug who lives in the shantytown and controls its child pickpockets. He is frequently drunk and mistreats those who fail to meet their daily quotas. He resents Ga-kyung's contempt for him and looks for an opportunity to retaliate.

- Jung Sang-hoon as Lee Bak-chun

A former farmer who was driven from his hometown after organizing a dispute against the exploitation of farmers by Japanese landowners. After wandering between places, he settled in Gyodang-ri, where he has lived for about ten years. He has a disability in one leg.

- Lee No-ah as Im Geum-ok

A resident of Gyodang-ri who lost her parents in the 1925 Great Flood of the Han River and became homeless with her younger sibling. Her sibling later left for a farm in Manchuria, and she waits for letters while making a living by weaving and selling straw mats.

- Yang Jo-ah as Kim Jo-i

A mysterious woman whose origins are unknown. When she first appeared in Gyodang-ri, she was carrying a deceased infant, which the villagers buried. Since then, she has carried a handmade doll wrapped in cloth as though it were a baby.

Family

- Lee Ki-young as Kim Seung-eok

The president of Joil Textile, one of the largest textile companies in Korea, and a prominent pro-Japanese collaborator. He is Kim Myeong-nam's father and seeks to arrange a marriage for her to secure an heir for his company.

- Kam Woo-sung as Geum Seok-joong

Yoo So-ran's former husband and the father of their daughter, Geum Seo-hee. A participant in the March 1 Movement, he becomes involved in the resistance against Japanese colonial rule. He participates in an assassination attempt targeting Sato Shinichi and is subsequently captured by Japanese authorities.

- Song Ji-hyo as Lee Ae-young

Ga-kyung's mother and Hideo's adoptive mother. She was formerly married to Sato Shinichi and is involved in Gugukdan's espionage activities.

Others

- Go Han-min as Mitarai
- Kevin Dockry as Jules Laurent
- Kang Ha-eun
- Choi Ji-woo

=== Special appearance ===
- Choi Dae-hoon as pawn shop owner

== Production ==
=== Development ===
The series was developed by Studio Dragon and produced by Studio Dragon and Nangman Crew. It was directed by Yoo In-shik from a screenplay by Ryu Bo-ri, marking their first collaboration. Yoo previously directed Dr. Romantic (2016–2023) and Extraordinary Attorney Woo (2022), while Ryu wrote Do You Like Brahms? (2020) and Trolley (2022).

Ryu began developing the story approximately five years before production and started writing the screenplay in 2023. Studio Dragon joined the planning and development process in 2024. The first script reading took place on February 6, 2026.

=== Casting and preparation ===
In October 2024, Kim You-jung was reported to have been cast in the lead role. The following month, Kim Hyun-joo was reported to have received an offer to join the series. In July 2025, Park Jin-young was reported to have been cast as the male lead, followed by Jin Seon-kyu in December. tvN officially confirmed the main cast, including Lee Moo-saeng, in February 2026.

The cast underwent language training for their roles, which required dialogue in Japanese, English, and Chinese. Language instructors provided individual coaching, and the actors prepared dialogue for 12 episodes before filming. Kim You-jung studied Japanese and English for five months, while Park Jin-young worked on distinguishing American and British English. Kim Hyun-joo studied Chinese pronunciation and tones, Lee Moo-saeng researched the speech patterns of an American character, and Jin Seon-kyu spent two months in Kyoto preparing his Japanese dialogue.

=== Filming ===
Principal photography began in March 2026 and was completed before the Chuseok holiday in September, with post-production underway by September 29. One of the series' filming locations was Nonsan Sunshine Land in Nonsan, South Chungcheong Province, which served as a major backdrop and had previously been used in the television series Mr. Sunshine.

=== Production design ===
Art director Yang Hong-sam led the production design, with the art team recreating 1932 Gyeongseong through research into period signage, furniture, and everyday objects. The Government-General sets featured high staircases, marble surfaces, and vertical columns to convey the authority of the colonial administration. The residence Heewon, where Yoo So-ran and Yoo Phillip stay, was inspired by the historic building Dilkusha, while the Gugukdan hideout was set beneath Hanseong Korean Medicine Clinic.

== Release ==
100 Days of Deception premiered on tvN on October 10, 2026, airing every Saturday and Sunday at 21:10 (KST). It is also available for streaming on TVING in South Korea and Netflix globally.

== Marketing ==
On July 2, with 100 days left until the drama's premiere, a special teaser was released, continuously highlighting the keyword "100" to captivate viewers.

On August 11, 2026, tvN announced a special exhibition titled 100 Days of Deception Special Exhibition: 1932 Gyeongseong, Becoming a Spy at the Seoul Museum of History. The exhibition presents the setting and characters of the series. The first-floor lobby exhibition runs from August 14 to September 27, 2026, while a display in the museum's third-floor permanent exhibition area runs from August 14 to November 29.

On September 21, tvN launched an interactive promotional website for 100 Days of Deception, allowing users to explore content related to the series and its 1932 Gyeongseong setting.

On September 22, tvN announced a special broadcast titled 100 Days of Deception: Secret Documents, scheduled to air on October 3, 2026, at 22:30 (KST), one week before the series premiere. The broadcast features the main cast introducing the series and their characters, with television personalities Tak Jae-hoon and Kim Jong-min serving as hosts.

== Original soundtrack ==
The original soundtrack for 100 Days of Deception is overseen by music director Kim Tae-seong. The soundtrack singles feature Kim Tae-rae of Zerobaseone, Lee So-ra, Luca Minor, So Soo-bin, and Wendy from Red Velvet.

=== Part 1 ===
Released on October 18, 2026
No.	Title	Lyrics	Music	Artist	Length
1.	"Together"	Siu; Seo Byung-soo	Siu; Seo Byung-soo	Kim Tae-rae	3:31
2.	"Together" (Inst.)		Siu; Seo Byung-soo		3:31
Total length:					7:02

=== Part 2 ===
Released on October 26, 2026
No.	Title	Lyrics	Music	Artist	Length
1.	"You"	Ahn Jae-hwan	Ahn Jae-hwan	Lee So-ra	3:27
2.	"You" (Inst.)		Ahn Jae-hwan		3:27
Total length:					6:54

=== Part 3 ===
Released on October 31, 2026
No.	Title	Lyrics	Music	Artist	Length
1.	"Same Old Heart"	Luca Minor	Luca Minor	Luca Minor	2:34
2.	"Same Old Heart" (Inst.)		Luca Minor		2:34
Total length:					5:08

=== Part 4 ===
Released on November 1, 2026
No.	Title	Lyrics	Music	Artist	Length
1.	"Remember Me"	Ko Yeong-in	Ko Yeong-in	So Soo-bin	3:11
2.	"Remember Me" (Inst.)		Ko Yeong-in		3:11
Total length:					6:22

=== Part 5 ===
Released on November 8, 2026
No.	Title	Lyrics	Music	Artist	Length
1.	"Even That Is Love" (그마저도 사랑이라)	Noheul	Noheul	Wendy	4:00
2.	"Remember Me" (Inst.)		Noheul		4:00
Total length:					8:00

== Reception ==
The series ranked first in TVING's weekly video-on-demand unique-user rankings in both the overall and drama categories for the week of October 19–25, 2026. Its overall ranking had risen from eighth place in the first week of October to second place in the second week and first place in the third week.

In the fifth week of October, the series ranked first in Good Data Corporation's Fundex TV–OTT drama buzz rankings for the second consecutive week. Park Jin-young and Kim You-jung also ranked first and second, respectively, in the actor buzz rankings.

=== Viewership ===
According to Nielsen Korea, 100 Days of Deception premiered with a nationwide viewership rating of 5.3% and a metropolitan area viewership rating of 5.4% on October 10, 2026. It also recorded the highest premiere rating among tvN's Saturday–Sunday dramas aired in 2026.

The sixth episode of the series, which aired on October 25, 2026, achieved a nationwide average rating of 9.515% and a metropolitan area average rating of 9.906%.

The eighth episode, which aired on November 1, recorded a new series-high nationwide average rating of 9.761% and a metropolitan area average rating of 10.675%. Its metropolitan area peak rating reached 11.6%.

100 Days of Deception : South Korea viewers per episode (millions)

Season	Episode number																Average
Season	1	2	3	4	5	6	7	8	9	10	11	12	13	14	15	16	Average
1	1.260	1.844	1.668	2.315	1.597	2.320	1.797	2.430	1.930	2.668	1.992	2.556	2.503	2.963	TBD	TBD	TBD

Source: Audience measurement performed nationwide by Nielsen Korea.

Average TV viewership ratings
Ep.	Original broadcast date	Average audience share (Nielsen Korea)	
Ep.	Original broadcast date	Nationwide	Seoul
1	October 10, 2026	5.3% (1st)	5.4% (1st)
2	October 11, 2026	7.6% (1st)	8.3% (1st)
3	October 17, 2026	7.0% (1st)	7.5% (1st)
4	October 18, 2026	9.0% (1st)	9.8% (1st)
5	October 24, 2026	6.5% (1st)	7.0% (1st)
6	October 25, 2026	9.5% (1st)	9.9% (1st)
7	October 31, 2026	7.2% (1st)	7.2% (1st)
8	November 1, 2026	9.8% (1st)	10.7% (1st)
9	November 7, 2026	7.4% (1st)	8.2% (1st)
10	November 8, 2026	10.7% (1st)	11.7% (1st)
11	November 14, 2026	8.0% (1st)	8.7% (1st)
12	November 15, 2026	10.4% (1st)	11.1% (1st)
13	November 21, 2026	10.0% (1st)	10.8% (1st)
14	November 22, 2026	11.7% (1st)	12.4% (1st)
15	November 28, 2026		
16	November 29, 2026		
Average		—	—
Special	October 3, 2026	1.7% (4th)	2.0% (3rd)
In the table above, the blue numbers represent the lowest ratings and the red numbers represent the highest ratings.; This drama airs on a cable channel/pay TV which normally has a relatively smaller audience compared to free-to-air TV/public broadcasters (KBS, SBS, MBC, and EBS).

== Accolades ==
=== Awards and nominations ===
Award ceremony	Year	Category	Nominee	Result	Ref.
Next-Generation Media Festival	2026	Grand Prize (Daesang)	100 Days of Deception	Won	

=== Listicles ===
Name of publisher, year listed, name of listicle, and placement
Publisher	Year	Listicle	Placement	Ref.
Joy News 24	2026	Best Dramas of the Year	7th (Note: mentioned together with The Legend of Kitchen Soldier and Four Hands, Two Sonatas)	
Parade	2026	These 54 K-Dramas Are Worth Losing Sleep Over	Top 54	
