= Baeksang Arts Award for Best New Actor – Film =

Annual award in South Korea

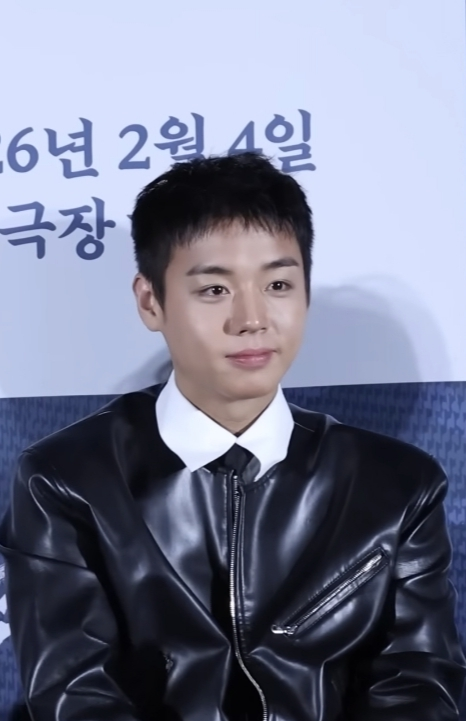
- 2026 recipient: Park Ji-hoon
- Awarded for: Best performance by a new actor in a South Korean film
- Country: South Korea
- Currently held by: Park Ji-hoon; The King's Warden (2026)
- Website: baeksangartsawards

The Baeksang Arts Award for Best New Actor – Film (Korean: 백상예술대상 영화부문 남자 신인 연기상; RR: Baeksang Yesul Daesang Yeonghwa Bumun Namja Sinin Yeongisang) is an award presented annually at the Baeksang Arts Awards ceremony organised by Ilgan Sports and JTBC Plus, affiliates of JoongAng Ilbo, usually in the second quarter of each year in Seoul.

== List of winners ==
#	Year	Actor	Film
1	1965	Kim Seok-gang	Extra Human Being
4	1968	Oh Yeong-il	Lost People
6	1970	Kim Hee-ra	
7	1971	Hah Myung-joong	Though There was No Vow
8	1972	Shin Yeong-il	Spring, Summer, Fall, and Winter
9	1973	Park Ji-hun	Girls' High School Days
9	1973	Choi Jung-min	Gate of Women
11	1975	Yoo Young-guk	A Wild Girl
11	1975	Kim Choo-ryeon	Living in a Cell
12	1976	Min Cheol	Windmill of My Mind
13	1977	Jin Yoo-young	Commando on the Nakdong River
14	1978	Kim Heung-ki	Scholar Yul-gok and His Mother Shin Sa-im-dang
17	1981	Kim Seong-chan	A Fine, Windy Day
18	1982	Lee Yeong-ho	Come Unto Down
20	1984	Kim Soo-chul	Whale Hunting
21	1985	Kang Seok-woo	The Stranger
22	1986	Yim Sung-min	Dreams of the Strong
23	1987	Park Joong-hoon	Ggambo
24	1988	Min Gyu	Campus Romance Seminar
25	1989	Choi Min-soo	Last Dance with Her
26	1990	Kim Bo-sung	Happiness Does Not Come In Grades
27	1991	Moon Sung-keun	Black Republic
28	1992	Lee Il-jae	General's Son II
29	1993	Cho Jae-hyun	Sorrow, Like a Withdrawn Dagger, Left My Heart
30	1994	Kim Byung-se	Rosy Days
31	1995	Lee Jung-jae	The Young Man
32	1996	Han Suk-kyu	The Ginkgo Bed
33	1997	Park Shin-yang	Yuri
34	1998	Im Chang-jung	Beat
35	1999	Lee Sung-jae	Art Museum by the Zoo
36	2000	Sul Kyung-gu	Peppermint Candy
37	2001	Yeo Hyun-soo	Bungee Jumping of Their Own
38	2002	Jung Woon-taek	Friend
39	2003	Kwon Sang-woo	My Tutor Friend
40	2004	Bae Yong-joon	Untold Scandal
41	2005	Yoon Kye-sang	Flying Boys
42	2006	Lee Joon-gi	King and the Clown
43	2007	Rain	I'm a Cyborg, But That's OK
44	2008	Jang Keun-suk	The Happy Life
45	2009	So Ji-sub; Kang Ji-hwan	Rough Cut
46	2010	Lee Min-ki	Haeundae
47	2011	Choi Seung-hyun	71: Into the Fire
48	2012	Kim Sung-kyun	Nameless Gangster: Rules of the Time
49	2013	Ji Dae-han	My Little Hero
50	2014	Kim Soo-hyun	Secretly, Greatly
51	2015	Park Yoo-chun	Haemoo
52	2016	Park Jeong-min	Dongju: The Portrait of a Poet
53	2017	Ryu Jun-yeol	The King
54	2018	Koo Kyo-hwan	Jane
55	2019	Kim Young-kwang	On Your Wedding Day
56	2020	Park Myung-hoon	Parasite
57	2021	Hong Kyung	Innocence
58	2022	Lee Hong-nae	Hot Blooded
59	2023	Park Jin-young	Christmas Carol
60	2024	Lee Do-hyun	Exhuma
61	2025	Jung Sung-il	Uprising
62	2026	Park Ji-hoon	The King's Warden

== Sources ==
- "Baeksang Arts Awards Nominees and Winners Lists". Naver Movie (in Korean).
- "Baeksang Arts Awards Winners Lists". Baeksang Arts Awards (in Korean).
