= Winter Heptagon =

EP by Got7
- Released: January 20, 2025
- Recorded: 2024
- Genres: Hip-hop, R&B, deep house, pop-punk
- Length: 27:31
- Label: Kakao Entertainment

Got7 chronology
Got7 (2022)	Winter Heptagon (2025)

Singles from Winter Heptagon
- 1. "Python" Released: January 20, 2025

Winter Heptagon is the thirteenth Korean-language extended play (EP) (seventeenth overall) by South Korea group Got7. It was released on January 20, 2025, with "Python" serving as the album's title track. This album marks the group's first reunion in three years and coincides with their eleventh anniversary.

== Background ==
The first rumors of Got7's return to the music scene emerged in March 2024, when BamBam, during an interview with Woody FM, stated that the songs were ready, but that they were waiting for Jay B and Jinyoung to return from military service before deciding on a date. On November 7, 2024, after being discharged from the military, Jinyoung stated that they had entered the preparatory stage, aiming to release the album by the end of the year, before Youngjae's and Yugyeom's enlistment. On November 30, 2024, Osen reported that the band would be reuniting with a new album in late January 2025, and was currently in the planning and recording stages of the project. The comeback was confirmed by Jay B on December 7 at the end of the South Korean leg of his solo tour, followed shortly after by BamBam announcing the project's release date, January 20. On December 21, the group unveiled the EP's title, Winter Heptagon, together with announcing their partnership with Kakao Entertainment for its release.

== Composition ==
The members wrote the lyrics and composed all the songs. The album's title recalls the Winter Hexagon, six stars especially visible in winter, and it is meant to reference Got7's debut season and that the members shine even brighter when together. Marianna Baroli of Panorama identified memory, growth and "the understanding that time changes things, but it doesn't erase what's real" as the main themes.

"Python" is a song with a pop melody and an hip-hop beat that talks about a destined love with a person from whom you can't escape and that "screams angst, yearning and nostalgia", contrasting personal success and vulnerability within the confines of a consuming relationship. Ize described the sound as sophisticated and mysterious, with a "crunchy" texture and a "sour and salty" flavor also found in other songs of the group such as "Stop Stop It," "Girls Girls Girls," "A" and "Just Right." "Smooth", first of three tracks completely in English, is a funky, upbeat song about living in the moment and going with the flow, while the lyrics of "Our Youth" were written keeping in mind the debut and the subsequent achievements: in addition to encouraging the members to move forward while remaining united, it contains references to the group by recalling Got7's motto "Come and get it" and the title of one of their EPs, 7 for 7 (2017). "Remember," of R&B and hip-hop influences, celebrates pure and lasting love, and Yugyeom wrote the lyrics thinking about his fans and the bond he has created with them as an artist over the past eleven years, while "Darling" is a sweet and romantic R&B song. With "Tidal Wave," the second English track, the band veers to deep house, talking about the desire for someone they consider their kryptonite, while "Out the Door," a song initially intended for Mark's solo album, is a pop punk piece. The album is closed by the ballads "Her," which talks about regret and a lost love, and "Yours Truly,", a message of gratitude to the fans.

== Critical reception ==
According to Janice Sim of Vogue Singapore, Winter Heptagon is an album that showcases all the group's distinctive traits and allows to easily glean the tenacity and specific charms of the seven members. Rolling Stone India praised the versatility and musical diversity given by the collaboration of the members. For Denver Del Rosario of The Inquirer, Winter Heptagon does not have a unified sound or style, but is a galaxy of genres, "a celebration of Got7's artistic evolution, both as a group of seven and as individuals" in which the goal is not cohesion, but "an exhibit of what a group can achieve when allowed to own its sound".

Journalist Jeon Hyo-jin has indicated Winter Heptagon as an album to listen to get to know the group's "sophisticated musical world," considering it an easy listen despite the different genres and including it among his personal recommendations both in January 2025, and at the end of the year. On July 26, 2025, it was listed in Screen Rant's "The 10 best K-pop albums released in 2025 so far" list.

At the end of the year, "Python" ranked sixth among the 25 best K-pop songs of the year according to Billboard Brasil.

== Commercial performance ==
Winter Heptagon debuted at #3 on the South Korean Circle Weekly Album Chart, selling just over 126,000 copies in its month of release. It also sold 1,897 copies in Japan, entering at #24 on the Oricon Physical Album chart for the week of January 20–26, 2025.

== Track listing ==
Winter Heptagon track listing
No.	Title	Lyrics	Music	Arrangement	Length
1.	"Python"	BamBam, Kyle Reynolds, JOOPEPE, Nick Lee, Jason Fox, Samik 'Symphony' Ganguly	BamBam, Kyle Reynolds, Nick Lee, Jason Fox, Samik 'Symphony' Ganguly	BamBam, Jeong Seong-min @ Psycho Tension	2:32
2.	"Smooth"	Alexis Andrea Boyd, Sayak Das, Jackson Wang, Louis Bartolini	Louis Bartolini, Sayak Das, Jackson Wang	Louis Bartolini, Sayak Das	2:42
3.	"Our Youth" (청춘드라마)	Ars, Brother Su	Ars, Brother Su, Eniac, Chicok	Eniac, Chicok	2:53
4.	"Remember" (기억할거야)	Yugyeom	Mortal, 4BOUT (about), Noise Master Minsu, Yugyeom	Mortal	2:14
5.	"Darling"	Def.	Def., iHwak, Jay Dope	Jay Dope	2:42
6.	"Tidal Wave"	Chris LaRocca, Jordan Cassius Kelman, Kyle Wildfern, Bryan Chong	BamBam, Chris LaRocca, Herag Sanbalian, Bryan Chong	BamBam, Jeong Seong-min @ Psycho Tension	3:10
7.	"Out the Door"	Wesley Feng, Mark Tuan, Fletcher Milloy, Geoffrey Black, Timothy Tandiyo	Wesley Feng, Fletcher Milloy, Timothy Tandiyo, Geoffrey Black, Mark Tuan	Timothy Tandiyo, Geoffrey Black, Mark Tuan, Wesley Feng, Fletcher Milloy	3:35
8.	"Her"	Jinyoung	Jinyoung , Distract, 82oom (Papermaker), Noah (Papermaker)	82oom (Papermaker), Noah (Papermaker)	3:57
9.	"Yours Truly," (우리가 할 수 있는 말은.)	Got7	Def., Wuk	Def., Wuk	3:51
Total length:					27:31

== Charts ==
=== Weekly charts ===
Weekly chart performance for Winter Heptagon
Chart (2025)	Peak position
Japanese Albums (Oricon)	24
Japanese Download Albums (Billboard Japan)	11
South Korean Albums (Circle)	3
