= Silhouette (Mark Tuan EP) =

- Digital cover

EP by Mark Tuan
- Released: November 7, 2025
- Recorded: 2025
- Genre: Pop; alternative rock
- Length: 13:50
- Language: English
- Label: Transparent Arts; DNA Records

Mark Tuan chronology
Fallin' (2022)	Silhouette (2025)

Singles from Silhouette
- 1. "High As You" Released: May 30, 2025; 2. "Hold Still" Released: August 15, 2025

Silhouette is the second extended play by American rapper and singer Mark Tuan, released on November 7, 2025.

== Background ==
Tuan started working on Silhouette at the beginning of 2025: with its mix of alternative rock and pop, the album represents an introduction to the kind of music the singer wants to make in the future. He described it as closer to his K-pop roots compared to The Other Side and Fallin' because the songs are more performance-focused.

== Track listing ==
No.	Title	Lyrics	Music	Length
1.	"High As You"	Captain Cuts, Aiden Bissett, DCF, Brett "Beef" Fair	Captain Cuts, Aiden Bissett, DCF, Brett "Beef" Fair	2:51
2.	"Sunsets and Cigarettes"	Keven Wolfsohn, Paul Bogumil Goller, Elijah Noll, DCF	Keven Wolfsohn, Paul Bogumil Goller, Elijah Noll, DCF	3:10
3.	"Pretty Little Picture"	Mark Tuan, Jack Omstead, Nick Vyner	Mark Tuan, Jack Omstead, Nick Vyner	2:41
4.	"Hold Still"	Mark Tuan, Anthony Russo, Michael Christofi, Anthony Watts	Mark Tuan, Anthony Russo, Michael Christofi, Anthony Watts	2:28
5.	"Autopilot"	Kevin Theodore, Louis Bartolini, Neil Ormandy, Nick Vyner	Kevin Theodore, Louis Bartolini, Neil Ormandy, Nick Vyner, Raiden	2:40
Total length:				13:50

== Charts ==
=== Weekly charts ===
Weekly chart performance for Silhouette
Chart (2025)	Peak position
South Korean Albums (Circle)	19

=== Monthly charts ===
Monthly chart performance for Silhouette
Chart (2025)	Position
South Korean Albums (Circle)	56
