= Red velvet =

Red velvet may refer to:

- Red velvet cake

== Films and theatres ==
- Red Velvet (film), a 2008 film starring Henry Thomas and Kelli Garner
- Red Velvet (play), a 2012 play by Lolita Chakrabarti

== Music ==
- Red Velvet (group), a South Korean girl group
  - Red Velvet – Irene & Seulgi, subunit formed in 2020
- "Red Velvet" (song), a song written by Ian Tyson and recorded by Johnny Cash
- "Red Velvet", a song from the OutKast album Stankonia

== Other uses ==
- Red velvetfish, Gnathanacanthus goetzeei
- Red velvet mite, arachnid of the family Trombidiidae
- Red velvet wrasse, Cirrhilabrus rubrisquamis
- Red Velvet (wrestler), American professional wrestler
- Kevin Huerter, American professional basketball player nicknamed "Red Velvet".
