= Chapter 0: With =

- Digital cover

EP by Jinyoung
- Released: January 18, 2023
- Genre: Pop
- Length: 17:18
- Language: Korean
- Label: BH Entertainment
- Producer: Jinyoung

Jinyoung chronology
Chapter 0: With (2023)	Said & Done (2026)

Singles from Chapter 0: With
- 1. "Cotton Candy" Released: January 18, 2023

Chapter 0: With is the first extended play by South Korean singer Jinyoung. It was released on January 18, 2023.

== Background and release ==
On November 17, 2022, BH Entertainment announced the release of Jinyoung's first solo album for January 2023. The actual release date, January 18, was announced on January 6 via Instagram. Pre-orders opened on January 10, 2023.

The songs have been written over two years and commemorate the tenth anniversary of the singer's debut, who described the album as "a collection of short stories woven together into one volume." Jinyoung is the sole songwriter, and co-composed four of the five tracks. The singer has stated that he loves writing about his feelings, sensations, and experiences, but, believing that they could be a heavy topic, he preferred to transform them into an expression of universal love.

In the first song, "Animal", he reflects on when he felt helpless and empty. It's followed by the title track "Cotton Candy", a pop song with disco funk influences, which represents a tribute to the fans' unconditional support. In "Our Miracle" he talks about a relationship born from destiny, referring to memories built with the members of Got7, while in "Sleep Well" he wishes a peaceful sleep expressing the sweetness of love. The album is closed by "Letter", in which he sings about a heartbreaking farewell.

== Critical reception ==
Billboard's Jeff Benjamin wrote, "Chapter 0 sees the star returning to a comfortable place as the suave and soothing vocalist, songwriter and composer." Money Today called the album "a collection of essays in which he candidly monologues about his inner self. His soft voice and sincere emotions make you listen to his musical stories." Nandini Iyengar of Bollywood Hungama deemed Chapter 0: With an album that explores the big themes of love and the different facets of relationships, focusing on the often overlooked everyday gestures, and commented that Jinyoung made good use of his strengths, namely his voice and lyrical ability. At the end of the year, it ranked #17 on the list of the 25 best K-pop albums of 2023 according to Billboard.

Kim Ho-hyun of IZM rated "Cotton Candy" 2.5 out of 5 stars, stating that no part particularly stood out and that the pre-chorus didn't connect harmoniously with the beat, causing the melody to lose strength.

== Commercial performance ==
Upon release, Chapter 0: With sold 20,449 copies according to the Circle Chart and 20,741 according to the Hanteo Chart. It debuted at #9 in South Korea on the Circle Weekly Album Chart with 36,349 copies sold, ultimately selling 41,954 copies in January 2023.

== Track listing ==
All lyrics are written by Jinyoung.

No.	Title	Music	Arrangement	Length
1.	"Animal"	Jinyoung; Distract; Brian Cho	Brian Cho	3:25
2.	"Cotton Candy"	Jinyoung; Distract; Ludwig Lindell	Ludwig Lindell	3:19
3.	"Our Miracle" (너를 만남이란 기적)	Jinyoung; Distract; Secret Weapon	Secret Weapon	3:30
4.	"Sleep Well" (잘 자)	Jinyoung; Distract; Ludwig Lindell	Ludwig Lindell	3:27
5.	"Letter" (편지)	Ahn Young-min		3:37
Total length:				17:18

== Charts ==
Chart performance for Chapter 0: With
Chart (2023)	Peak position
South Korean Albums (Circle)	9
