= The Other Side (Mark Tuan album) =

- Digital cover

Studio album by Mark Tuan
- Released: August 26, 2022
- Studio: DNA Studios, Los Angeles
- Genre: R&B; hip-hop; alternative rock; pop; electronic dance music
- Length: 54:07
- Language: English
- Label: DNA Records

Singles from The Other Side
- 1. "Last Breath" Released: November 12, 2021; 2. "My Life" Released: January 21, 2022; 3. "Lonely" Released: March 24, 2022; 4. "Save Me" Released: April 7, 2022; 5. "IMYSM" Released: July 1, 2022

The Other Side is the first studio album by American singer Mark Tuan, released on August 26, 2022, through DNA Records.

It was preceded by the release of several singles throughout 2021 and 2022 that explore heartbreak, loneliness, and confusion.

== Background ==
The Other Side chronicles the emotions, sad moments, and difficult times Tuan experienced during his ten years in South Korea, from the time he moved at the age of 16, to his return to Los Angeles at 27, illustrating the untold stories of "an ordinary boy named Mark" rather than the smiling, happy side he showed to the public while working as an idol. Involved in every phase of the album, he was inspired to create an album that chronicled "just moments where we're depressed. Times where we felt like people don't really give a shit about us. The low lows" after his first solo studio session in 2021, and called it "the cleansing that I needed in order to move forward."

Wanting many people to relate to the lyrics, he conveyed the messages through love songs about the relationship between himself and a fictional character, rather than openly expressing his own feelings. While making the album, Tuan was inspired by various artists, including LANY, Justin Bieber, Machine Gun Kelly and The Kid Laroi.

== Release and musical composition ==
The Other Side was released on August 26, 2022, along with the music video for "Far Away," a melancholic, rock-infused R&B track in which the singer recalls a broken relationship and decides to move on. Tuan wrote the lyrics and music for all 20 songs; most showcase Tuan's vocal abilities, but he returns to rapping, the role he was assigned to in Got7, on "Change Up" and "My Name."

The album opens with the R&B track "Run Away," where he sings about the challenges of growing up, making bad decisions, and taking responsibility for his mistakes. "No Tears" celebrates returning home, while "Change Up" and "My Name" provide his take on life as a pop star and recount his decade with Got7 in Seoul. The album then moves on to explore loneliness and tiredness when the spotlight goes out: "At My Low" is a thank you to the fans who kept him grounded and helped him move forward. The second part of the album shifts towards livelier rhythms, while still maintaining a dark and introspective atmosphere.

Of the five singles released prior to the album's release, the first, "Last Breath," was released on November 12, 2021, and is about a person ready to break away from a suffocating situation or relationship. For the song, Tuan worked with Lil Spirit and Ovrcz, who produced it with Pharaoh Vice and Nash, while the singer was involved in the creative direction of the music video. "Last Breath" combines Tuan's breathy vocals with a hip-hop rhythmic base, opening with a light bass guitar echo that then evolves to blend with synthesizer and piano.

The second single, titled "My Life," was released on January 21, 2022. Again co-written with Lil Spirit and Ovrcz, and co-produced by Pharaoh Vice, it depicts a period during which Tuan, realizing he was sacrificing his own happiness, was trying to maintain his identity. It is a sentimental ballad that focuses on the singer's vocals, blending "rich, poignant piano melodies and melancholic synth sounds" and concluding with an open-ended orchestral finale; lyrically, it finds Tuan torn between his true identity and the versions of himself he has constructed over the years, describing the days of pushing his emotions aside and pretending everything is okay, embodying "what living life on autopilot feels like." Tuan stated that this was the way he felt over the past two years and that the song was about the journey that led him to want to continue making music, rather than giving up after returning to the United States in early 2021.

"Lonely" was released on March 24, 2022, and was written by Tuan, Lil Spirit, and Matty Michna, with the latter producing alongside BL$$D, JordanXL, and Xavi. The song was inspired by the feeling of loneliness and isolation he felt after returning to his hotel room after touring the world with Got7. Featuring pop-rock sounds, "Lonely" combines a percussion arrangement, electric guitar riffs, synth bass, and finger snaps, while the lyrics describe the emotional turmoil of a man struggling with a relationship that has come to an end, given the difference in commitment from both partners.

The fourth single, "Save Me," was released on April 7, and features the singer once again collaborating with Lil Spirit on the songwriting. Lil Spirit also serves as producer with Ovrcz, Western Weiss, and Sean Silverman. "Save Me" is an R&B song that describes the emotional imbalance caused by relationship friction, hinting at the inability to understand and love oneself, sabotaging relationships with those around them, and the lyrics shift from relief after the relationship ended to the resulting sense of vulnerability, anxiety, and loneliness.

A fifth single, titled "IMYSM," was released on July 1, 2022. Produced by Nash, Rio Leyva, Lil Spirit, and Ovrcz, and co-written by Tuan with Geno Gitas and Niccolo Justin Short, it is a pop song with synth guitar and bass chords that talks about missing the person you love.

== Critical reception ==
Professional ratings
Review scores
Source	Rating
NME	2/5 stars

Jeff Benjamin of Billboard wrote, "Beyond musical elements, the most striking part of The Other Side is the raw introspections the star shares. Through his lyrics, he explores the topics of self-doubt, toxic friendships, unfaithfulness and the pressure to be perfect. The album's straightforward, lo-fi production also better shines the light on these challenging topics."

Divyansha Dongre of Rolling Stone India felt that the beauty of The Other Side was that you didn't have to have lived an extraordinary life to relate to the songs, and that, although the album lost its sonic appeal halfway through, "the honesty and lyrical fluency Tuan brings to the record make up for the aural monotony."

Tanu I. Raj of NME found the album "relatively steady on the conceptual end with some stellar offerings, but it provides little sonic excitement, at times sounding insular and repetitive" and dragging on with "homogenous-sounding filler tracks." They deemed the album "raw and rough around the edges in some places and almost an instinctual stream of consciousness in others," hoping for a shorter running time and more musical variety. They concluded that the album's strength was Tuan's openness, but that overall The Other Side offered "balefully few thrilling moments, which is a shame because Tuan displays evident growth in his lyricism."

== Track listing ==
All lyrics are written by Mark Tuan; all music is composed by Mark Tuan.

No.	Title	Lyrics	Music	Length
1.	"Running Away"	Geno Gitas, Niccolo Justin Short	Geno Gitas, Niccolo Justin Short	2:12
2.	"No Tears"	Geno Gitas, Niccolo Justin Short	Geno Gitas, Niccolo Justin Short	2:22
3.	"IMYSM"	Geno Gitas, Niccolo Justin Short	Geno Gitas, Niccolo Justin Short	2:27
4.	"Change Up"	Wesley Feng, Jerry Lang, Adam Korbesmeyer	Wesley Feng, Jerry Lang, Adam Korbesmeyer	3:18
5.	"My Name"	Anthony Russo, Kyle Buckley, Rob Nelson	Anthony Russo, Kyle Buckley, Rob Nelson	2:30
6.	"At My Low"	Geno Gitas	Geno Gitas	2:29
7.	"After Hours (Interlude)"	Ellise Gitas, Chelsea Collins, Geno Gitas	Ellise Gitas, Chelsea Collins, Geno Gitas	2:00
8.	"Lonely"	Geno Gitas, Matthew Michna	Geno Gitas, Matthew Michna	3:33
9.	"2 Faces"	Wesley Feng, Jerry Lang, Adam Korbesmeyer	Wesley Feng, Jerry Lang, Adam Korbesmeyer	2:52
10.	"Only Human"	Geno Gitas	Geno Gitas	2:58
11.	"My Life"	Geno Gitas, Niccolo Justin Short	Geno Gitas, Niccolo Justin Short	2:54
12.	"Exhausted"	Niccolo Justin Short, Geno Gitas	Niccolo Justin Short, Geno Gitas	2:27
13.	"Save Me"	Geno Gitas	Geno Gitas	3:12
14.	"Let U Go"	Geno Gitas, Niccolo Justin Short	Geno Gitas, Niccolo Justin Short	3:09
15.	"Last Breath"	Geno Gitas, Niccolo Justin Short	Geno Gitas, Niccolo Justin Short	2:41
16.	"Hard 2 Love"	Geno Gitas	Geno Gitas	2:05
17.	"Broken"	Geno Gitas, Niccolo Justin Short	Geno Gitas, Niccolo Justin Short	2:26
18.	"Selfish"	Geno Gitas	Geno Gitas	2:54
19.	"More"	Colin Magalong, David Wilson	Colin Magalong, David Wilson	2:25
20.	"Far Away"	Geno Gitas	Geno Gitas	3:13
Total length:				54:07

== Commercial success ==
The Other Side debuted at #8 in South Korea on the Circle Weekly Album Chart with 28,232 copies sold. It was the 19th best-selling album in the country in September 2022 with 35,365 copies.

"Broken", "2 Faces", "No Tears" and "Save Me" entered the Billboard Hot Trending Songs Chart.

== Charts ==
=== Weekly charts ===
Weekly chart performance for The Other Side
Chart (2022)	Peak position
South Korean Albums (Circle)	8

=== Monthly charts ===
Monthly chart performance for The Other Side
Chart (2022)	Peak position
South Korean Albums (Circle)	19
