= Christmas Carol (2022 film) =

South Korean 2022 thriller drama film

- Theatrical release poster
- Hangul: 크리스마스 캐럴
- RR: Keuriseumaseu kaereol
- MR: K'ŭrisŭmasŭ k'aerŏl
- Directed by: Kim Seong-soo
- Written by: Kim Seong-soo; Joo Won-gyu
- Based on: Christmas Carol by Joo Won-gyu
- Produced by: Choi Jin; Suh Young-joop
- Starring: Park Jin-young; Kim Young-min; Kim Dong-hwi; Song Geon-hee; Heo Dong-won
- Cinematography: Kim Jeong-jin
- Edited by: Park Jin-yeong
- Music by: Park In-young
- Production companies: Blue Planit; Finecut
- Distributed by: D-Station
- Release date: December 7, 2022
- Running time: 131 minutes
- Country: South Korea
- Language: Korean
- Box office: US$171,789

Christmas Carol (Korean: 크리스마스 캐럴) is a 2022 South Korean thriller film based on the novel of the same name by Joo Won-gyu. Directed by Kim Seong-soo, it stars Park Jin-young, Kim Young-min, Kim Dong-hwi, Song Geon-hee, and Heo Dong-won.

== Synopsis ==
Joo Il-woo and Joo Wol-woo are identical twin brothers. On Christmas morning, Joo Wol-woo is discovered dead. His death was ruled accidental, but Joo Il-woo refuses to accept the outcome. Having heard some guys beating Wol-woo when he last spoke with his brother over the phone, he tracks them down and purposely gets himself locked up in a juvenile jail camp in order to exact revenge.

== Cast ==
- Park Jin-young as Joo Il-woo / Joo Wol-woo
- Kim Young-min as Jo Soon-woo
- Kim Dong-hwi as Son Hwan
- Song Geon-hee as Moon Ja-hoon
- Heo Dong-won as Han See-hang
- Kim Jeong-jin as Baek Young-joong
- Seo Jin-won as Choi Noo-ri
- Kim In-cheol as task leader
- Jang Hyun-dong as inmate
- Im Seo-eun as welfare worker

== Production ==
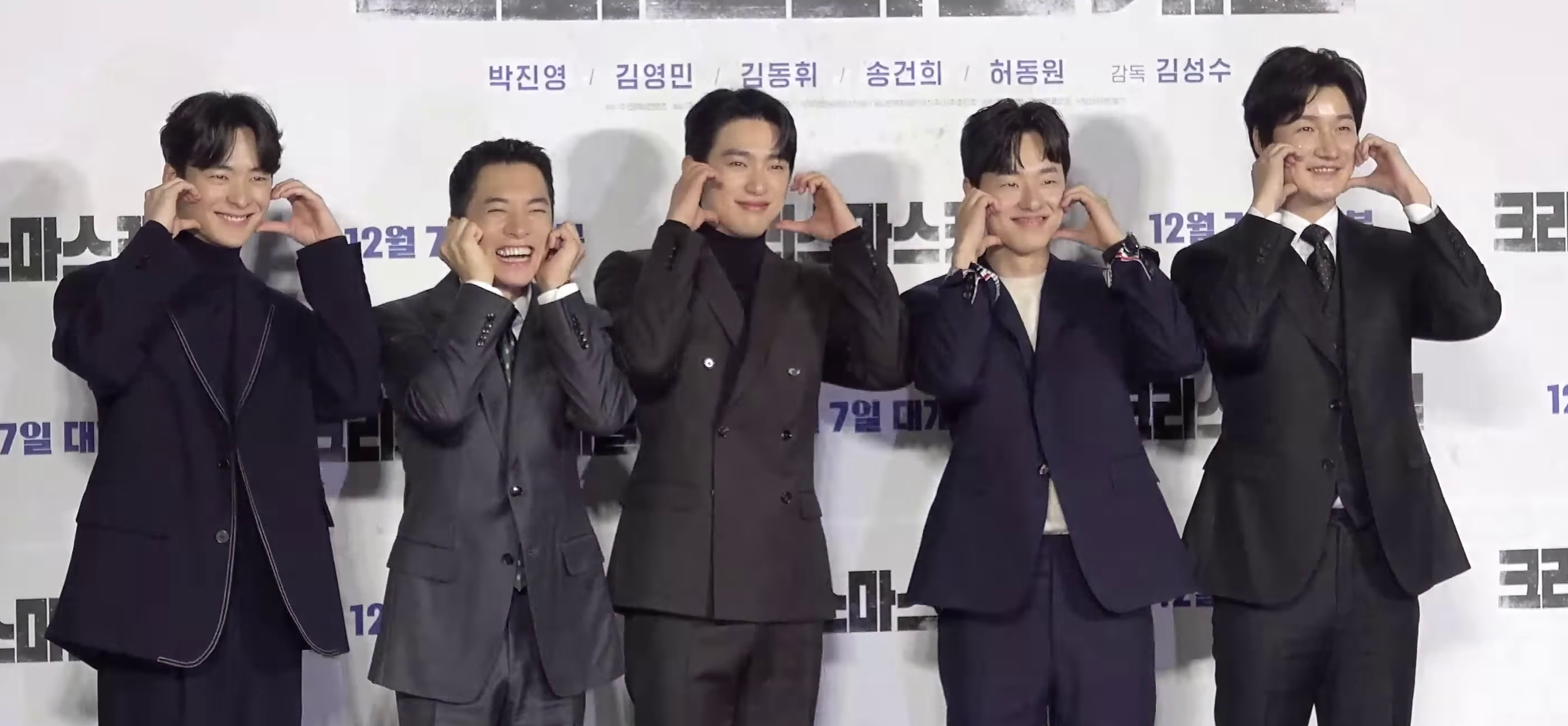
The main cast at the film press conference. From left to right: Song Geon-hee, Kim Young-min, Park Jin-young, Kim Dong-hwi, and Heo Dong-won.

The film is based on Joo Won-gyu's 2016 novel of the same name. Director Kim Seong-soo stated that he wanted to adapt the book into a film to tell the story of how two brothers ended up one full of anger and the other with a sad smile, and that the first time he read it he thought of the people that society marginalizes and does not protect; thus, he wanted to shed light on the victims, in this case Wol-woo, believing that they are usually ignored in a revenge film. This goal was achieved through Il-woo, and the unexpected events and truths he encounters that lead him to find his humanity. The action scenes were shot focusing on the characters' emotions and with the intention of making the viewer feel uncomfortable with their violence. The overall goal of the film is to shed light on various social problems by showing characters devoid of morality.

When casting the actors, director Kim focused on the psychological changes and emotional clashes between the characters. Park Jin-young, whose casting as the twins Il-woo and Wol-woo was announced on October 8, 2021, was selected after a chance meeting with the director, who stated that he was persuaded to offer him the roles because he appreciated the contrast between Park's strong gaze and the natural and gentle look given by his beard. Park said that he first read the book, finding it "disgusting and terribly disturbing," and then the script, which was instead more refined. Since there were fewer scenes of violence than the original work, he initially considered turning it down, but then decided he wanted to tackle such a role. To properly portray Wol-woo, he met with five people with developmental disabilities. Kim Young-min, Kim Dong-hwi, and Heo Dong-won joined Park on October 18, 2021.

Filming began on January 28, 2022 and lasted for nine months. Park shot Wol-woo's scenes first and then Il-woo's.

== Release ==
Christmas Carol was released in South Korean theaters on December 7, 2022, with viewing recommended for adult audiences only. Overseas rights were acquired by Warner Bros. Discovery for Hong Kong, Macau, Singapore, Malaysia, Indonesia, Vietnam, the Philippines, and Brunei; by At Entertainment for Japan; by Sahamongkol Film International for Thailand; and by Cai Chang International for Taiwan. In Taiwan, the film was released on December 9, 2022, while in Japan on May 12, 2023.

The home video DVD edition was released in South Korea on February 28, 2023.

== Reception ==
=== Box office ===
In South Korea, Christmas Carol sold 24,235 tickets, earning a total of US$158,417. On its release day, it was the most viewed film among premieres and the second most viewed film overall.

=== Critical ===
The film was generally well received by critics, who praised the actors' performances, particularly Park Jin-young's: Jo Jae-yong of Single List called it "unmatched" and Jeon Hyung-hwa of Star News found that he managed to express "pain, suffering, sadness, sorrow and forgiveness" with a single look.

Joynews24 described Christmas Carol as a sad and heartbreaking story that one may or may not like, given the considerable amount of swearing, violence and revenge, but that was still able to give food for thought. Celuvmedia deemed it a film that gets to the heart of social problems caused by indifference and ignorance, while making the viewer feel uncomfortable. On the other hand, Kim Sung-hyun of YTN found the story stagnant and the directing old-fashioned, leading to a waste of the cast's talent and hard work.

=== Accolades ===
Name of the award ceremony, year presented, category, nominee of the award, and the result of the nomination
| Award ceremony | Year | Category | Nominee / Work | Result | Ref. |
|---|---|---|---|---|---|
| Baeksang Arts Awards | 2023 | Best New Actor – Film | Park Jin-young | Won | |
| Baeksang Arts Awards | 2023 | Most Popular Actor | Park Jin-young | Won | |
| Korean Association of Film Critics Awards | 2023 | Best New Actor | Park Jin-young | Won | |
| Wildflower Film Awards | 2023 | Best New Actor | Park Jin-young | Nominated | |
