= Kim Kwon =

South Korean actor

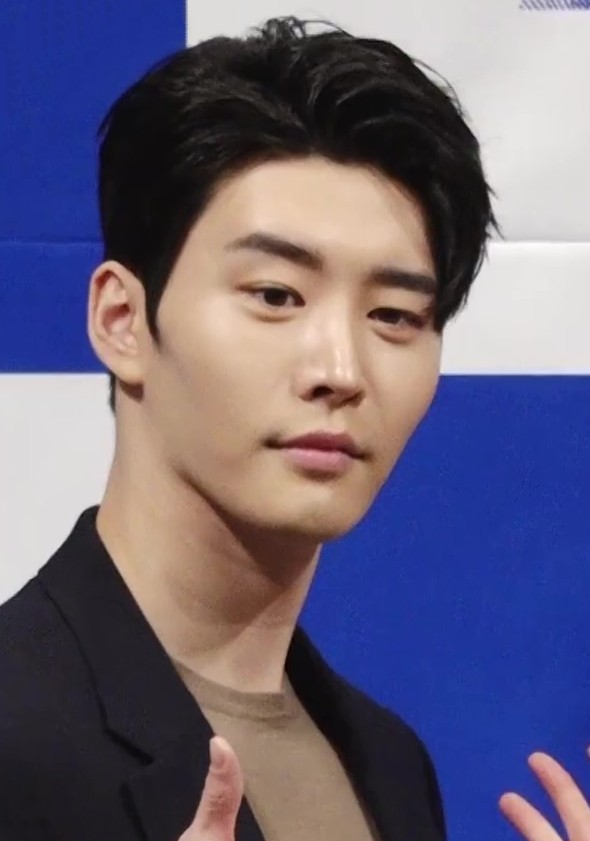
- Kim in March 2019
- Born: Kim Keon-woo; May 16, 1989 (age 37); South Korea
- Education: Dongguk University – Department of Theatre
- Occupation: Actor
- Years active: 2012–present
- Agent: A Ground

Korean name
- Hangul: 김건우
- RR: Gim Geonu
- MR: Kim Kŏnu

Stage name
- Hangul: 김권
- RR: Gim Gwon
- MR: Kim Kwŏn

Kim Kwon (born Kim Keon-woo on May 16, 1989) is a South Korean actor. He played roles in television dramas such as Secret Love Affair (2014), Heard It Through the Grapevine (2015), and Marry Me Now (2018). He rose to prominence upon playing a lead role in He is Psychometric (2019) and has since played another lead role in the American remake series Leverage (2019).

== Filmography ==
=== Films ===
Year	Title	Role	Ref.
2013	Mai Ratima	Male host 3	
2013	Pluto	Han Myung-ho	
2013	Days of Wrath	Joon-suk (young)	
2016	Pure Love	Young-il	

=== Television series ===
Year	Title	Role	Notes	Ref.
2011	Me Too, Flower!		minor role	
2012	Drama Special Series – Little Girl Detective Park Hae-Sol	Min Soo-young		
2013	Flower of Revenge	Kang Sung-min		
2013	The Heirs	Se Ryun's PD		
2014	Secret Affair	Woo Sung		
2014	Into the Flames	Park Tae-hyung (young)		
2014	Only Love	Soccer player	cameo	
2015	Heard It Through the Grapevine	Yoon Je-hoon		
2015	Cheo Yong 2	Han Tae-kyung		
2015	Sweet, Savage Family	Lee Joon-suk		
2016	Second to Last Love	Cha Soo-hyuk		
2016	On the Way to the Airport	Choi Je-ah		
2017	Voice	Psychopathic doctor	cameo (ep. 16)	
2017	Criminal Minds	Kang Ho-young	cameo (ep.7)	
2017	Manhole	Man attending church		
2017	Witch at Court	Baek Min-ho		
2018	Marry Me Now	Choi Moon-sik		
2019	He Is Psychometric	Kang Sung-mo		
2019	Leverage	Roy Ryu		
2021	Navillera	Yang Ho-beom		
2022	Thirty-Nine	Students in Jeong Chan-young's acting class	cameo (ep.1)	
2023	The Killing Vote	Lee Min-soo		
2023	Destined With You	Lee Hyeon-seo	cameo	
2025	Pump Up the Healthy Love	Lee Ro-yi		

=== Web series ===
Year	Title	Role	Ref.
2022	Rookie Cops	Jo Han-sol	

== Awards and nominations ==
Year	Award	Category	Nominated work	Result	Ref.
2018	32nd KBS Drama Awards	Best New Actor	Marry Me Now	Won	
2023	SBS Drama Awards	Excellence Award, Actor in a Miniseries Genre/Action Drama	The Killing Vote	Nominated	
