= He Is Psychometric =

2019 South Korean television series

- Promotional poster
- Also known as: Psychometric Fellow
- Hangul: 사이코메트리 그녀석
- Lit.: That Psychometric Guy
- RR: Saikometeuri geu nyeoseok
- MR: Saik'omet'ŭri kŭ nyŏsŏk
- Genre: Fantasy; Thriller; Mystery; Procedural; Romantic comedy
- Created by: Studio Dragon
- Written by: Yang Jin-ah
- Directed by: Kim Byung-soo
- Starring: Park Jin-young; Shin Ye-eun; Kim Kwon; Kim Da-som
- Country of origin: South Korea
- Original language: Korean
- No. of episodes: 16

Production
- Executive producer: Lee Jin-suk
- Camera setup: Single-camera
- Production company: JS Pictures

Original release
- Network: tvN
- Release: March 11 – April 30, 2019

He Is Psychometric (Korean: 사이코메트리 그녀석) is a 2019 South Korean television series starring Park Jin-young, Shin Ye-eun, Kim Kwon, and Kim Da-som. It aired from March 11 to April 30, 2019, on tvN's Mondays and Tuesdays at 21:30 KST.

== Synopsis ==
After losing his parents in a fire, Lee Ahn (Park Jin-young) acquires the power of psychometry, the ability to read a person or an object's past through physical contact, and he decides to use it to combat criminals. While he does not know how to control his power yet, he meets Yoon Jae-in (Shin Ye-eun), who tries her best to hide her painful secrets. Together with his foster guardian, prosecutor Kang Sung-mo (Kim Kwon), and the latter's colleague, investigator Eun Ji-soo (Kim Da-som), they team up to solve an elusive case that has been haunting the lives of Ahn, Sung-mo, and Jae-in. The case revolves around the life of prosecutor Kang and his parents, who were the main cause of the fire. Jae-in and Lee Ahn heal each other through their past, present, and future to find the culprit.

== Cast ==
=== Main ===
- Park Jin-young as Lee Ahn
  - Kim Tae-yool as young Lee Ahn

A young man who acquires the power of psychometry, the paranormal ability to read a person or object's past or secrets by touching it or if these come into contact with his skin. He lost his parents in a fire when he was young.

- Shin Ye-eun as Yoon Jae-in
  - Kim Soo-in as young Jae-in

A smart young woman whose father was framed for arson. She meets Lee Ahn at the age of 19 after transferring to his high school. Her dream is to become a prosecutor and clear her father's name, but she eventually becomes a police officer. She later develops feelings for Lee Ahn and begins dating him.

- Kim Kwon as Kang Sung-mo
  - Jo Byeong-kyu as young Sung-mo

He is a special investigation unit prosecutor who saved Lee Ahn from the fire that killed his parents. Later, he became Lee Ahn's legal guardian as his adoptive brother. He has a cold exterior yet cares for Lee Ahn and others around him dearly.

- Kim Da-som as Eun Ji-soo

She is the investigator of the police special investigation unit. She often asks Lee Ahn for help as she knows about his psychometric abilities. She is very optimistic, and it is obvious she likes Sung-mo.

=== Supporting ===
==== People around Lee Ahn ====
- Lee Jong-hyuk as Lee Jeong-rok

Lee Ahn's father. He was a police officer who died when the apartment caught fire.

- Noh Jong-hyun as Lee Dae-bong (21 years old)

Lee Ahn's best friend. He has been in love with Kim So-hyun since high school.

==== People around Yoon Jae-in ====
- Jung Suk-yong as Yoon Tae-ha

Jae-in's father. He was a firefighter before he became a security guard at Yeongseong Apartment and was framed for being the arsonist.

- Kim Hyo-jin as Oh Sook-ja (43 years old)

Jae-in's maternal aunt. She is a teacher and legal guardian of Yoon Jae-in after her father was arrested.

- Go Youn-jung as Kim So-hyun (21 years old)

Jae-in's childhood friend who got pregnant in high school.

==== People around Kang Sung-mo ====
- Lee Seung-joon as Kang Geun-taek

Kang Sung-mo's father. In his youth, he developed an attraction-turned-obsession over Eun-joo, and he locked her up with their son Sung-mo for a long time.

- Jeon Mi-seon as Kang Eun-joo

Kang Sung-mo's mother and the subject of Geun-taek's obsession. She bore Geun-taek a son (Sung-mo) while being locked up. When she and Sung-mo managed to escape, she had spent her entire life hiding from Geun-taek. She was presumed dead in the Yeongseong Apartment fire.

==== Others ====
- Sa Kang as Hong Soo-yeon

Eun Ji-soo's close friend and an autopsy director in the forensics department.

- Kim Won-hae as math teacher
- Kim Ji-sung as Ji-sung
- Jang Eui-soo as Lee Seung-yong (21 years old)

He is the youngest investigator of the unit.

- Park Chul-min as Nam Dae-nam (49 years old)

He is a police lieutenant.

- Um Hyo-sup as Eun Byung-ho

Eun Ji-soo's father. He is a police superintendent.

== Production ==
- The first script reading took place on December 6, 2018, at Studio Dragon in Sangam-dong, Seoul, South Korea.
- The series is directed by Kim Byung-soo (The Bride of Habaek, A Korean Odyssey).
- Jeong Yoo-ahn left the drama because of a sexual harassment investigation against him. He was replaced by Jo Byeong-kyu.
- A press conference was held on March 5, 2019, with the presence of Kim Byung-soo, Park Jin-young, Shin Ye-eun, Kim Da-som and Kim Kwon.

== Original soundtrack ==
He Is Psychometric OST

Soundtrack album by Various artists
- Released: 2019
- Genre: Soundtrack
- Languages: Korean; English
- Label: Stone Music Entertainment

=== He Is Psychometric: Original Soundtrack ===
No.	Title	Lyrics	Music	Artist	Length
1.	"Take"	Naiv; Jayins; Ha Hyun-sang	Naiv; Jayins; Ha Hyun-sang	Jus2 (Yugyeom and Jay B from Got7)	3:12
2.	"With You"	Nam Hye-seung; Jello Ann; MIYO	Nam Hye-seung; MIYO	Fromm	4:17
3.	"Sunny Day"	Jayins; Ji Ye-joon	Jayins	Seunghee (Oh My Girl)	3:19
4.	"The First Love"	Nam Hye-seung; Surf Green	Nam Hye-seung; Surf Green	Minseo	4:09
5.	"Shadows on the Wall"	Nam Hye-seung; JELLO ANN	Dante; VORANAH	Janett Suhh	3:29
6.	"Take a Break" (쉬어가)	Nam Hye-seung; Surf Green	Nam Hye-seung; Park Jin-ho	O.O.O	3:38
7.	"He Is Psychometric" (Opening Title)			Nam Hye-seung; Park Sang-hee	0:42
8.	"Humming for Death"			Chae Joon-gi	1:10
9.	"Train Is Leaving"			Choi Jin-woo	2:47
10.	"Then, We Were"			Nam Hye-seung; Go Eun-jung	1:58
11.	"Boys on the Car"			Jo Eun-jung	2:16
12.	"I Found Them"			Jeon Jung-hoon	2:02
13.	"Shade of a Tree"			Nam Hye-seung; Go Eun-jung	1:35
14.	"Space Run"			Heo Seok	2:49
Total length:					37:23

He Is Psychometric: Original Soundtrack Parts 1–6

=== Part 1 ===
Released on March 26, 2019
No.	Title	Lyrics	Music	Artist	Length
1.	"Take"	Naiv; Jayins; Ha Hyun-sang	Naiv; Jayins; Ha Hyun-sang	Jus2 (Yugyeom and JB from Got7)	3:12
2.	"Take" (Inst.)		Naiv; Jayins; Ha Hyun-sang		3:12
Total length:					6:24

=== Part 2 ===
Released on April 2, 2019
No.	Title	Lyrics	Music	Artist	Length
1.	"With You"	Nam Hye-seung; Jello Ann; MIYO	Nam Hye-seung; MIYO	Fromm	4:17
2.	"With You" (Inst.)		Nam Hye-seung; MIYO		4:17
Total length:					8:34

=== Part 3 ===
Released on April 9, 2019
No.	Title	Lyrics	Music	Artist	Length
1.	"Sunny Day"	Jayins; Ji Ye-joon	Jayins	Seunghee (Oh My Girl)	3:19
2.	"Sunny Day" (Inst.)		Jayins		3:19
Total length:					6:38

=== Part 4 ===
Released on April 16, 2019
No.	Title	Lyrics	Music	Artist	Length
1.	"The First Love"	Nam Hye-seung; Surf Green	Nam Hye-seung; Surf Green	Minseo	4:09
2.	"The First Love" (Inst.)		Nam Hye-seung; Surf Green		4:09
Total length:					8:18

=== Part 5 ===
Released on April 22, 2019
No.	Title	Lyrics	Music	Artist	Length
1.	"Shadows on the Wall"	Nam Hye-seung; JELLO ANN	Dante; VORANAH	Janett Suhh	3:29
2.	"Shadows on the Wall" (Inst.)		Dante; VORANAH		3:29
Total length:					6:58

=== Part 6 ===
Released on April 30, 2019
No.	Title	Lyrics	Music	Artist	Length
1.	"Take a Break" (쉬어가)	Nam Hye-seung; Surf Green	Nam Hye-seung; Park Jin-ho	O.O.O	3:38
2.	"Take a Break" (Inst.)		Nam Hye-seung; Park Jin-ho		3:38
Total length:					7:06

== Viewership ==
He Is Psychometric : South Korea viewers per episode (thousands)

Season	Episode number																Average
Season	1	2	3	4	5	6	7	8	9	10	11	12	13	14	15	16	Average
1	625	574	524	490	571	660	640	657	614	568	599	580	567	613	564	597	590

Source: Audience measurement performed nationwide by Nielsen Media Research.

Average TV viewership ratings
Ep.	Original broadcast date	Average audience share		
Ep.	Original broadcast date	AGB Nielsen		TNmS
Ep.	Original broadcast date	Nationwide	Seoul	Nationwide
1	March 11, 2019	2.467%	2.698%	2.9%
2	March 12, 2019	2.156%	2.434%	2.2%
3	March 18, 2019	1.932%	2.231%	2.8%
4	March 19, 2019	2.108%	2.229%	3.0%
5	March 25, 2019	2.349%	2.969%	—N/a
6	March 26, 2019	2.794%	3.440%	—N/a
7	April 1, 2019	2.587%	3.142%	2.8%
8	April 2, 2019	2.711%	3.067%	—N/a
9	April 8, 2019	2.538%	2.974%	3.0%
10	April 9, 2019	2.471%	2.901%	2.9%
11	April 15, 2019	2.422%	2.913%	2.6%
12	April 16, 2019	2.456%	2.766%	2.7%
13	April 22, 2019	2.114%	2.775%	2.3%
14	April 23, 2019	2.589%	3.367%	2.8%
15	April 29, 2019	2.345%	2.850%	—N/a
16	April 30, 2019	2.277%	2.631%	2.7%
Average		2.395%	2.837%	— (Note: Due to some ratings not recorded, the exact average rating is unknown.)
In the table above, the blue numbers represent the lowest ratings and the red numbers represent the highest ratings.; N/A denotes that the rating is not known.; This drama airs on a cable channel/pay TV which normally has a relatively smaller audience compared to free-to-air TV/public broadcasters (KBS, SBS, MBC and EBS).

== Awards and nominations ==
Year	Award	Category	Recipient	Result	Ref.
2019	12th Korea Drama Awards	Star of the Year Award	Shin Ye-eun	Won	
2019	StarHub Night of Stars	Favourite Korean Drama Male Character	Park Jin-young	Won	
