= Said & Done (EP) =

- Digital cover

EP by Jinyoung
- Released: May 13, 2026
- Studios: Doobdoob Studio, DreamFactory Studio
- Genres: Pop; Contemporary R&B
- Length: 16:41
- Languages: Korean, English
- Label: BH Entertainment

Jinyoung chronology
Chapter 0: With (2023)	Said & Done (2026)

Singles from Said & Done
- 1. "Everlove" Released: May 13, 2026

Said & Done is the second extended play by South Korean singer Jinyoung. It was released on May 13, 2026.

== Background and release ==
Jinyoung's new album was announced in March 2026. The extended play was released on May 13 and consists of six tracks: "And Now" is entirely in English, while "Seventeen" and "One-Sided Love" see Jinyoung collaborating with Wonpil and Choi Yu-ree, respectively. Jinyoung co-authored the lyrics for "Everlove" and "Seventeen". The EP, which reinterprets the sound of the Nineties in a modern way, incorporating dance pop and jazzy R&B, talks about memories and emotions from the singer's childhood, concluding that love is what remains in the end, after all words and stories have passed.

== Commercial performance ==
Said & Done debuted at #13 in South Korea on the Circle Weekly Album Chart with 26,474 copies sold, ultimately selling 31,636 copies in May 2026.

== Track listing ==
No.	Title	Lyrics	Music	Arrangement	Length
1.	"And Now"	Distract	Distract; 82oom (Papermaker)	82oom (Papermaker)	1:08
2.	"Everlove"	Lee Young-suk; Park Jin-young; Park Da-hye; David Ambert (153/Joombas); Edwin Honoret; Grant "YOG$" Barber; Grant Sayler	David Ambert (153/Joombas); Edwin Honoret; Grant "YOG$" Barber; Grant Sayler	David Ambert (153/Joombas); Edwin Honoret; Grant "YOG$" Barber; Grant Sayler	2:34
3.	"Seventeen" (feat. Wonpil; 열일곱)	Park Jin-young; Wonpil	Chaz Jackson; Romello Rozier; AJ Melvin; Kosmic	Chaz Jackson	3:31
4.	"Different Tracks"	Sophia Pae	Dzell (Clef); Yoo I-ji (Clef); Clef Crew	Dzell (Clef)	2:48
5.	"Will I Be Okay?" (나는 괜찮을까요)	Gureum	Gureum	Gureum	3:24
6.	"One-Sided Love" (feat. Choi Yu-ree; 외사랑)	Choi Yu-ree	Choi Yu-ree	Choi Yu-ree	3:16
Total length:					16:41

== Charts ==
=== Weekly charts ===
Weekly chart performance for Chapter 0: With
Chart (2026)	Peak position
South Korean Albums (Circle)	13

=== Monthly charts ===
Monthly chart performance for Chapter 0: With
Chart (2026)	Peak position
South Korean Albums (Circle)	38
