= The Mirror Foundation =

Thai non-governmental organization

Mirror Foundation
- Type: Non-governmental organization
- Industry: Community development
- Founded: 1991
- Headquarters: Mae Yao, Chiang Rai Province, Thailand
- Website: themirrorfoundation.org

The Mirror Foundation, formerly known as Mirror Art Group, is a non-governmental organization (NGO) based in northern Thailand in the Chiang Rai Province's sub-district of Mae Yao, Mueang Chiang Rai District. The organization's aim is to help hill tribe people in the area with issues such as citizenship, drug abuse, erosion of culture, and the trafficking of women and children. Founded in 1991 by Mr Sombat Boonngamanong, the foundation has for over 15 years worked to promote the rights of the hill tribes. With its bannok.com website, it has recruited local volunteers and donations to help hill tribe villages.

The organization and its website, which is among "the most popular" in Thailand according to the 2006 book Empowering Marginal Communities with Information Networking, are cited as examples of the effective use of the Internet to "facilitate indigenous peoples' access to the political arena and...raise awareness about indigenous peoples' issues at the national level." The 2001 book Towards Financial Self-reliance: A Handbook on Resource Mobilization for Civil Society Organizations in the South featured Mirror Group as a case study in mobilizing resources for community development through the internet.

== Projects ==
Ongoing projects of the foundation include helping to mediate the process of applying for Thai citizenship between the hill tribe people and the government. attempting to locate and re-unite missing persons—many of whom are victims of human trafficking—with their loved ones, and raising awareness of such trafficking. The Project to Combat Trafficking in Women and Children helps educate the public about issues related to trafficking, including raising public awareness that giving money to child beggars may fuel crime, as many of the child beggar operations are conducted by people who exploit children for personal gain. The foundation also runs an ICT Project, which teaches computing skills to local hill tribes in the Chiang Rai region and also to the people affected by the tsunami in December 2004. The foundation also runs The Hilltribe Life and Cultural Centre at Ban Jalae and the Virtual Hilltribe Museum at www.hilltribe.org, which combined, serve as vessels to preserve the culture of the hill tribes for future generations.

The foundations website, in addition to providing information about the foundation and the issues it seeks to address, also serves as an outlet for hill tribespeople to sell their art and crafts online.

Past projects have included the Tsunami Volunteer Centre (TVC), which was set up in 2005 in collaboration with the Thai Health Promotion Foundation in Phang Nga Province to help with the relief and rebuilding efforts in support of the people and area affected by the tsunami.
