= Jiyeon discography =

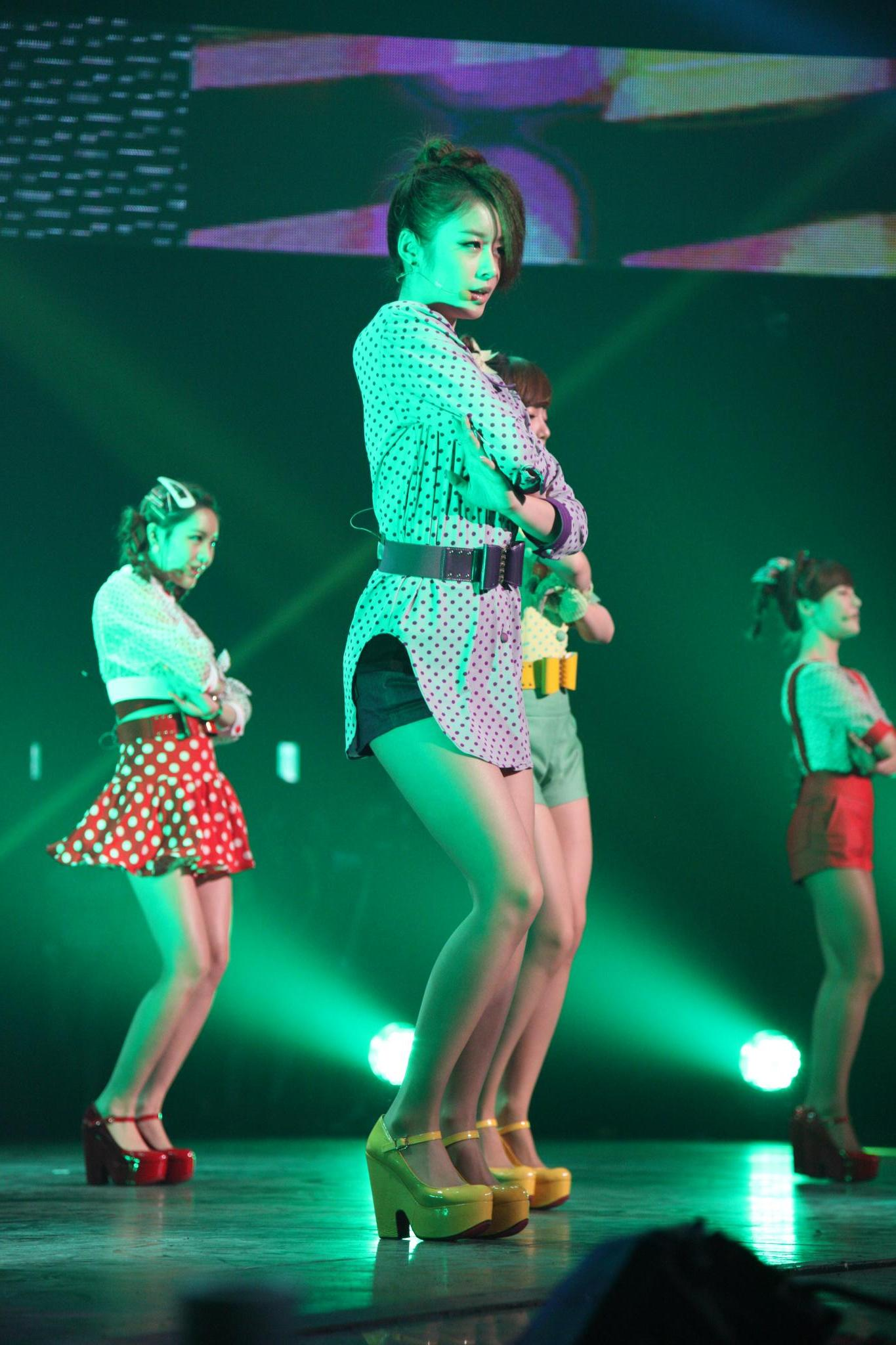
- Jiyeon in 2011
- EPs: 2
- Singles: 4
- Soundtrack appearances: 14
- Other appearances: 3

Jiyeon is a South Korean singer and actress. Her discography currently consists of 2 extended plays, 6 singles and 5 soundtrack appearances.

== Extended plays ==
Title	Album details	Peak positions		Sales
Title	Album details	KOR	TWN	Sales
Never Ever	Released: May 20, 2014; Label: Core Contents Media, KT Music; Format: CD, digital download	3	2	KOR: 16,639
Senpass	Released: December 26, 2019 (China Only); Label: Longzhen Culture Development, Kakao M; Format: CD (Note: Only 2,000 limited edition physical copies of the album were produced and were sold exclusively in China.), digital download	—	—	
"—" denotes releases that did not chart or were not released in that region.

== Singles ==
Title	Year	Peak positions		Sales	Album	Notes
Title	Year	KOR		Sales	Album	Notes
Title	Year	Gaon	Hot	Sales	Album	Notes
"Women's Generation" (with Davichi & Seeya)	2009	*	*		Non-album single	special collaboration project
"1 Minute 1 Second (Never Ever)"	2014	17	16	KOR: 322,949	Never Ever	
"Between Us" (with Soobin Hoang Son)	2018	—	—		Non-album single	Vietnamese song
"Take A Hike"	2019	— (Note: "Take A Hike" did not chart on the Circle Digital chart but peaked at 77 on the BGM chart.)	—		Senpass	
"—" denotes recordings which were not released in that country or failed to chart. "*" denotes charts which did not exist at the time of release.

== Promotional singles ==
Title	Year	Peak positions		Sales	Album	Notes
Title	Year	KOR	CHNV Chart	Sales	Album	Notes
"Summer Love" (with Jun-hyung of 2BiC featuring Yoon Yo)	2016	— (Note: "Summer Love" did not chart on the Circle Digital singles but peaked at 34 on the BGM, 47 on Bell, 29 on Ring and 34 on social chart.)	—	KOR: 11,683	Non-album single	
"One Day"	2018	— (Note: "One Day" did not chart on the Circle Digital singles but peaked at 54 on the social chart)	1 (Note: "One Day" (CHN Ver.) peaked at 2 on the same chart and at 1 on the chinese chart.)		Non-album single	Released as a Christmas fan-gift
"Rolling (2022 Ver.)	2022	— (Note: "Rolling (2022 Ver.)" did not chart on the Circle Digital singles but peaked at 94 on the sales and at 43 on the Bell chart.)	*		Non-album single	Remake of the 2010 original soundtrack
"—" denotes recordings which were not released in that country or failed to chart. "*" denotes charts which did not exist at the time of release.

== Original Soundtracks ==
Song	Year	Peak positions		Sales	Album	Notes
Song	Year	Gaon	Hot	Sales	Album	Notes
"Rolling"	2010	8	*	KOR: 541,620	Master of Study OST	The song was never released as a stand-alone single like most OSTs
"Run" (Note: (Ernest Feat. Ji-yeon, Go Ah-seong))	2010	—	*		Master of Study OST	The song was never released as a stand-alone single like most OSTs
"Coffee Over Milk" (Note: (with Hyomin & Lee Bo-ram))	2010	74	*	KOR: 526,712	Coffee House OST	
"Little By Little"	2010	— (Note: "Little By Little" did not chart on the Circle Digital singles but peaked at 85 on the Bell, 99 on the Ring and 53 on the BGM chart.)	*		Jungle Fish 2 OST	The song was never released as a stand-alone single like most OSTs
"Little By Little" (acoustic Ver.)	2010	88	*		Jungle Fish 2 (Special Edit)	
"Superstar" (Note: (with Hyolyn and Ailee))	2012	11	14	KOR: 793,000	Dream High 2 OST	
"Together" (Note: (with JB))	2012	22	25	KOR: 343,000	Dream High 2 OST	
"Day After Day"	2012	22	31	KOR: 277,000	Dream High 2 OST	
"Kiss And Cry" (Note: with Cho Seung-hee (F-ve Dolls) and Shorry J (Mighty Mouth))	2014	—	*	KOR: 15,000	Triangle OST	
"Way Back Home"	2018	— (Note: "Way Home" did not chart on the Circle Digital singles but peaked at 93 on the BGM chart.)	—		Queen of Mystery 2 OST	
"One Blue Night"	2019	— (Note: "One Blue Night" did not chart on the Circle Digital singles but peaked at 16 on the BGM chart.)	—		I Wanna Hear Your Song OST	
"No Answer"	2021	—	—		Imitation OST	
"My Old Story" (Note: with Lee Jun-young)	2021	—	—		Imitation OST	
"Closer"	2021	—	—		Imitation OST	
"Your Sign" (Note: with Imitation cast)	2021	—	—		Imitation OST	
"—" denotes recordings which were not released in that country or failed to chart. "*" denotes charts which did not exist at the time of release.

== Other charted songs ==
Title	Year	Peak positions	Sales	Album
Title	Year	KOR	Sales	Album
"Yeouido Cherry Blossom" (Note: Re-released in 2024 as part of "Cherry Blossom Love" compilation album)	2014	70	KOR: 10,500	Never Ever
"Marionette"	2014	80	KOR: 9,800	Never Ever
"—" denotes releases that did not chart or were not released in that region.

== Other appearances ==
Song	Year	Artist	Album
"Dangerous" (With Eun-jung & Hyomin)	2013	T-ara	Bunny Style (Single)
"My Sea"	2013	T-ara	Bunny Style (Single)
"Lullaby"	2017	T-ara	What's My Name? (EP)
