= List of Park Ji-yeon live performances =

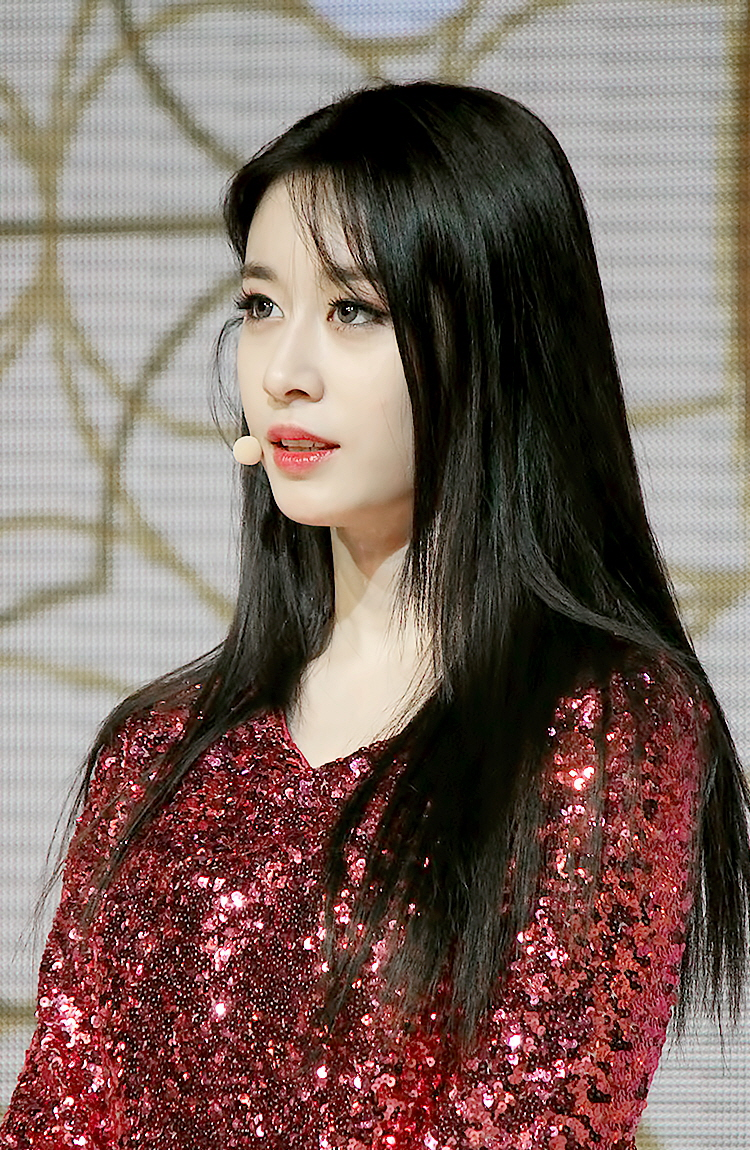
- Park Ji-yeon in 2017
- Fanmeetings: 5
- Award Shows: 2
- Music Festivals: 3
- Joint Concerts & Tours: 8
- TV Shows & Specials: 17

South Korean singer and actress Park Ji-yeon has performed in multiple concerts and festivals since 2009. Her first appearance on stage was in May 2009 performing the collaboration song "Women's Generation" with Davichi and Seeya, before her debut in the girl group T-ara.

== Fanmeetings ==
Year	Date	Title	City	Country	Venue	Ref.
2016	March 3, 2016	"What Should I Do?"	Bangkok	Thailand	Aksra Theatre	
2022	July 30, 2022	"Re:Bloom"	Seoul	South Korea	Yundang Art Hall	
2026	July 4, 2026	"The Voice of Dreams"	Beijing	China	Private venue	
2026	October 24, 2026	"The Voice of Dreams"	Beijing	China	Private venue	
2026	November 21, 2026	"Re:Meet"	Guangzhou	China	Private venue	

=== Canceled fan meetings ===
In 2018, Jiyeon announced that she will hold her first fan meeting in Hong Kong, in September that year. However, on August 22, she announced on her Instagram, that due to heath issues, she's unable to hold the event.

== Award Shows ==
Year	Date	Title	City	Country	Ref.
2010	December 31, 2010	MBC Drama Awards	Seoul	South Korea	
2015	April 11, 2015	YinYueTai Music Awards	Beijing	China	

== Festivals ==
Year	Date	Title	City	Country	Performed Song(s)	Ref.
2011	December 29, 2011	SBS Music Festival	Seoul	South Korea		
2011	December 30, 2011	MBC Music Festival	Seoul	South Korea	"I'm Your Gir" (Note: S.E.S cover, with IU and f(x) Luna)	
2015	August 8, 2015	Summer K-Pop Festival	Seoul	South Korea	"Candy In My Ear" (Note: Baek Ji-young cover)	

== Joint Concerts & Tours ==
Year	Date	Title	City	Country	Performed Song(s)
2009	May 7, 2009	Open Concert	Seoul	South Korea	"Women's Generation"
2009	June 6, 2009	Open Concert	Seoul	South Korea	"Women's Generation"
2009	July 2, 2009	Summer Break Concert	Seoul	South Korea	"Women's Generation"
2009	July 4, 2009	Yongsan Independence Day concert	Seoul	South Korea	"Women's Generation"
2014	June 7, 2014	20th Dream Concert	Seoul	South Korea	"Never Ever"
2018	December 29, 2018	V Live End-Year Concert	Ho Chi Minh City	Vietnam	"Between Us"
2025	November 1, 2025	K-Food Fair 2025	Hai Phong	Vietnam	"Never Ever"; "Between Us"; "Lullaby; "Bo Peep Bo Peep"; "Sexy Love"; "Lovey Dovey"; "Roly Poly"
2026	August 28, 2026	Quang Ninh: The City of Bright Future	Ha Long	Vietnam	"Never Ever"; "Lullaby; "Roly Poly"; "Lovey Dovey"

== TV Shows & Specials ==
Year	Date	Show	Performed Song(s)	Notes
2009	June 11, 2009	M Countdown	"Shoes" (cover)	
2010	January 31, 2010	Inkigayo	"Mickey" (Note: Toni Basil cover)	
2010	May 26, 2010	You Hee-yeol's Sketchbook	"Wait A Minute" (Note: The Pussycat Dolls cover)	
2010	June 5, 2010 (Note: Half-Year Special)	Music Bank	"Chitty Chitty Bang Bang" (Note: Lee Hyori cover)	
2010	July 1, 2010	M Countdown	"What Should We Finish" (Note: Collaboration stage with Soyeon)	
2010	July 18, 2010	Kim Jung-eun's Chocolate	"What Should We Finish"	
2010	July 25, 2010	Inkigayo	"What Should We Finish"	
2010	September 22, 2010	Star Idol Couple Battle (Note: Chuseok special program)	"Bbi Ri Bba Bba" (Note: Narsha cover); "Dangerous" (Note: Michael Jackson cover); "Smooth Criminal" (Note: Michael Jackson cover)	
2011	March 3, 2011	M Countdown	"It's You" (Note: Collaboration stage with F-ve Dolls)	
2011	March 4, 2011	Music Bank	"It's You"	
2011	March 5, 2011	Music Core	"It's You"	
2011	March 6, 2011	Inkigayo	"It's You"	
2011	March 18, 2011	Music Bank	"It's You"	
2011	December 25, 2011 (Note: End-Year Special)	Inkigayo	"Christmas Girls" (Cover)	
2012	July 15, 2011 (Note: Hot Summer Special)	Inkigayo	"Let's Take A Trip" (Cover)	
2014	July 1, 2014 (Note: MC Special)	The Show	"Trouble Maker" (Note: Trouble Maker cover)	
2021	May 7, 2021 (Note: TV Drama)	Imitation	"No Answer"	
