= Park Ji-yeon =

South Korean singer and actress (born 1993)

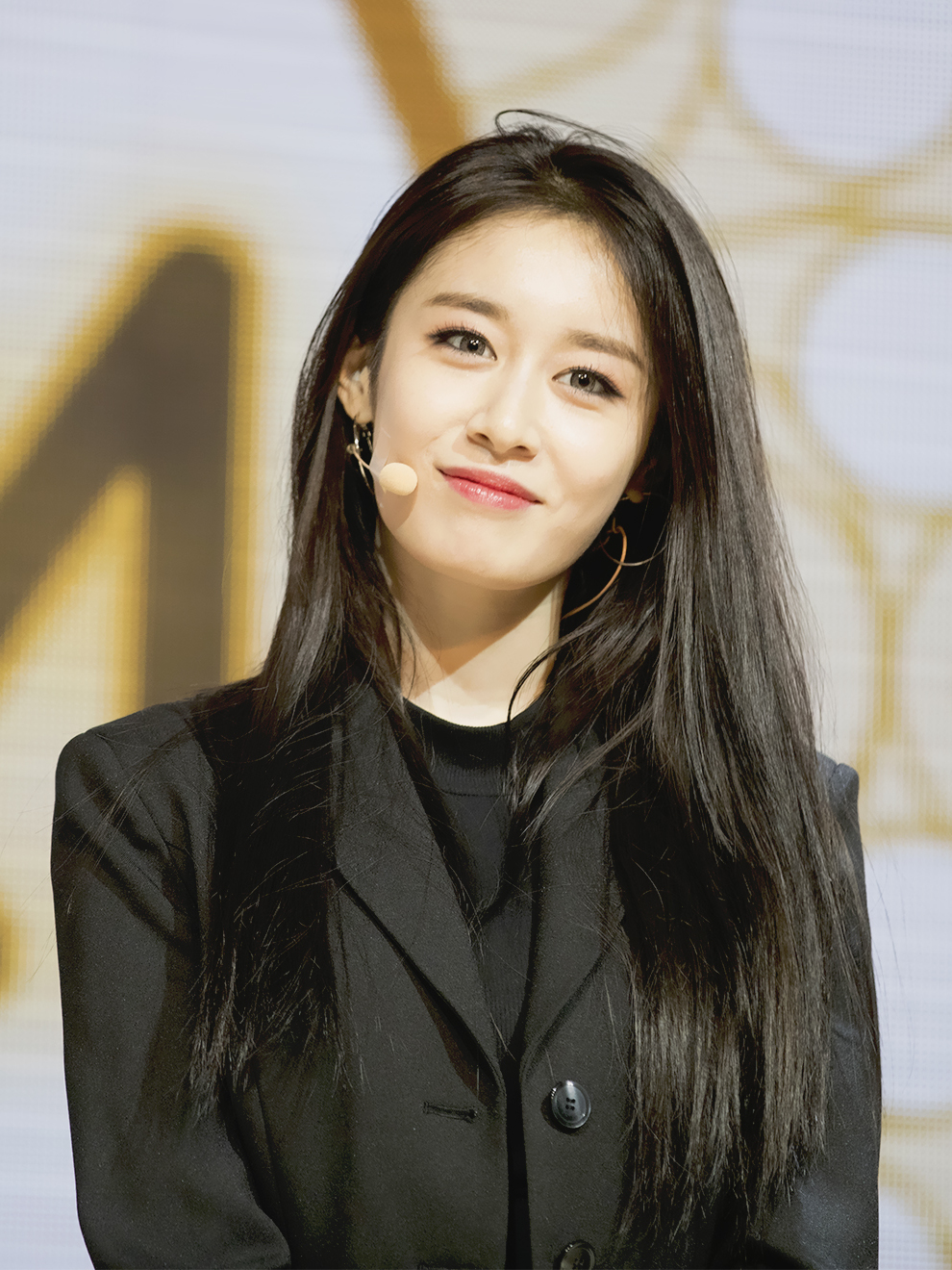
- Park in June 2017
- Born: June 7, 1993 (age 33); Seoul, South Korea
- Education: Lila Art High School
- Occupations: Singer; actress; model
- Agent: AnB Group
- Spouse: Hwang Jae-gyun (m. 2022; div. 2024)
- Musical career
- Genre: K-pop
- Instrument: Vocals
- Years active: 2007–present
- Labels: MBK; EMI Japan; Banana Culture; Longzhen Culture
- Member of: T-ara; T-ara N4
- Website: Jiyeon's Partners Park Official Page

Korean name
- Hangul: 박지연
- Hanja: 朴芝妍
- RR: Bak Jiyeon
- MR: Pak Chiyŏn

Signature
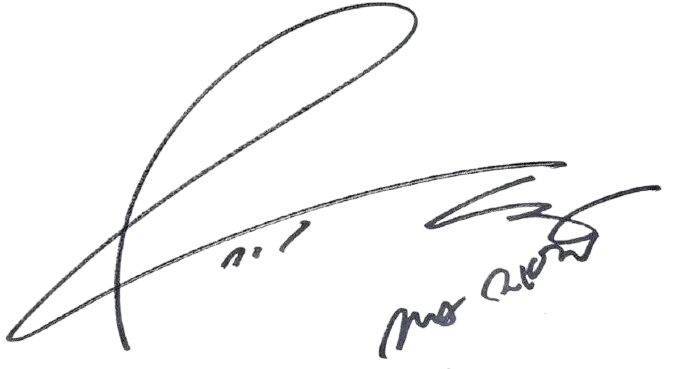

Park Ji-yeon (Korean: 박지연; born June 7, 1993), known mononymously as Jiyeon, is a South Korean singer, actress, model, host and entertainer. She debuted as a member of girl group T-ara in July 2009, which later went on to become one of the best-selling girl groups of all time. Apart from her group's activities, she has also starred in various television dramas such as Soul, Master of Study, Dream High 2, Triangle, she also starred in various films such as Death Bell 2: Bloody Camp. She debuted as a solo artist with her first EP, Never Ever, on May 20, 2014, the first T-ara member to debut as a solo artist.

== Early life and education ==
Park was born in Seoul, South Korea, on June 7, 1993 to an ethnic Korean family. She briefly attended Hyehwa Girls' High School and graduated from Lila Art High School in 2012. She didn't attend university to focus on her career.

== Career ==
=== 2007–2009: Career beginning and T-ara ===
She and Hahm Eun-jung are the only two members of T-ara to be trained in acting. Instead, the two switched over to singing despite their original intentions.

Park has expressed an interest in modeling. In 2008, when she was 15 years old, she was featured in several pictorials and advertisements for clothing company Smart with Korean boy band SHINee. She collaborated with Davichi and SeeYa on the digital single "Women's Generation", which was released in May 2009, making her the first member of T-ara to appear in public. She appeared in SG Wannabe's music videos "I Love You" and "Crybaby" from their 2009 album, Gift from SG Wannabe. Early on, the Korean media dubbed her as "Little Kim Tae-hee" due to her close resemblance to Kim. Park auditioned at the Mnet Casting System and joined the company in 2008. She subsequently debuted with T-ara on July 29, 2009.

=== 2007–2013: Acting debut and breakthrough ===
In 2007, Park starred in Lobbyist. The following year, she starred in Ae-ja and Min-ja. On May 22, 2009, it was announced that Jiyeon would make her film debut with a supporting role in Gas Station 2. However, on June 22, her label, CCM, confirmed that she had withdrawn from the project due to scheduling conflicts.

In 2009 Park starred in Soul. The same year, Park starred in High Kick! 2, In 2010, Park starred in Master of Study, a Korean screen adaptation of Japanese manga Dragon Zakura. That same year, she played the leading role in horror film Death Bell 2: Bloody Camp and starred in the youth drama Jungle Fish 2. On December 29, 2009, the actress was rushed to the emergency room in Seoul due to schedule overload.

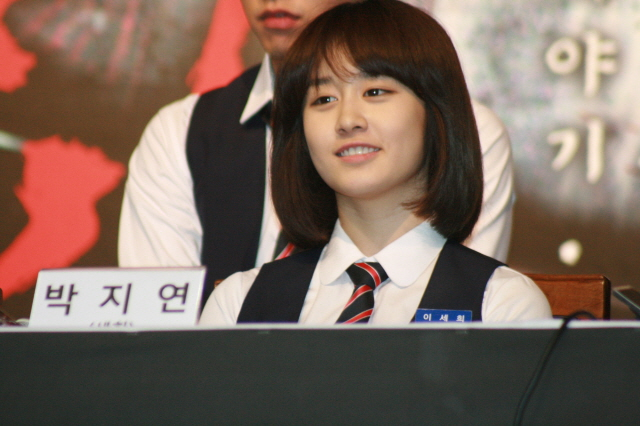
Park at an event promoting Death Bell 2: Bloody Camp

In October 2010, Park became the host for MBC's Show! Music Core, alongside Bae Suzy, Choi Min-ho and Onew. She also became a cast member of SBS's variety show Heroes. In 2011, Park was cast in the Korean dub of the animated film, Gnomeo and Juliet. In 2012, she was cast in the teen drama Dream High 2, starring Kang So-ra, Got7's JB and Jin-young, 2AM's Jinwoon, Sistar's Hyolyn, and Park Seo-joon.

=== 2014–2017: Solo debut ===
Park made her solo debut in May 2014, releasing the title track "Never Ever" (also known as "1 Minute 1 Second"). The music video ranked number one on China's largest music video platform YinYueTai for two weeks straight. In June, Park was cast in MBC's television series Triangle, starring as the potential wife for Yim Si-wan's character. The same month, she began hosting SBS M's The Show: All About K-pop alongside Lee Hye-ri.

In May 2015, Park was cast in the Korean-Chinese film Encounter alongside actor Lee Dong-gun. Due to unknown reasons, the film was never released. In July 2015, she collaborated with 2BiC's Jun-hyung on the song "Summer Love". In 2016, Park was cast in the web drama My Runway alongside Kang Dong-ho. The drama was released on Netflix in December 2016. In February 2017, it was announced that Park would be making her solo comeback after three years with a new album. However, album preparations were later cancelled due to T-ara's controversy resurfacing.

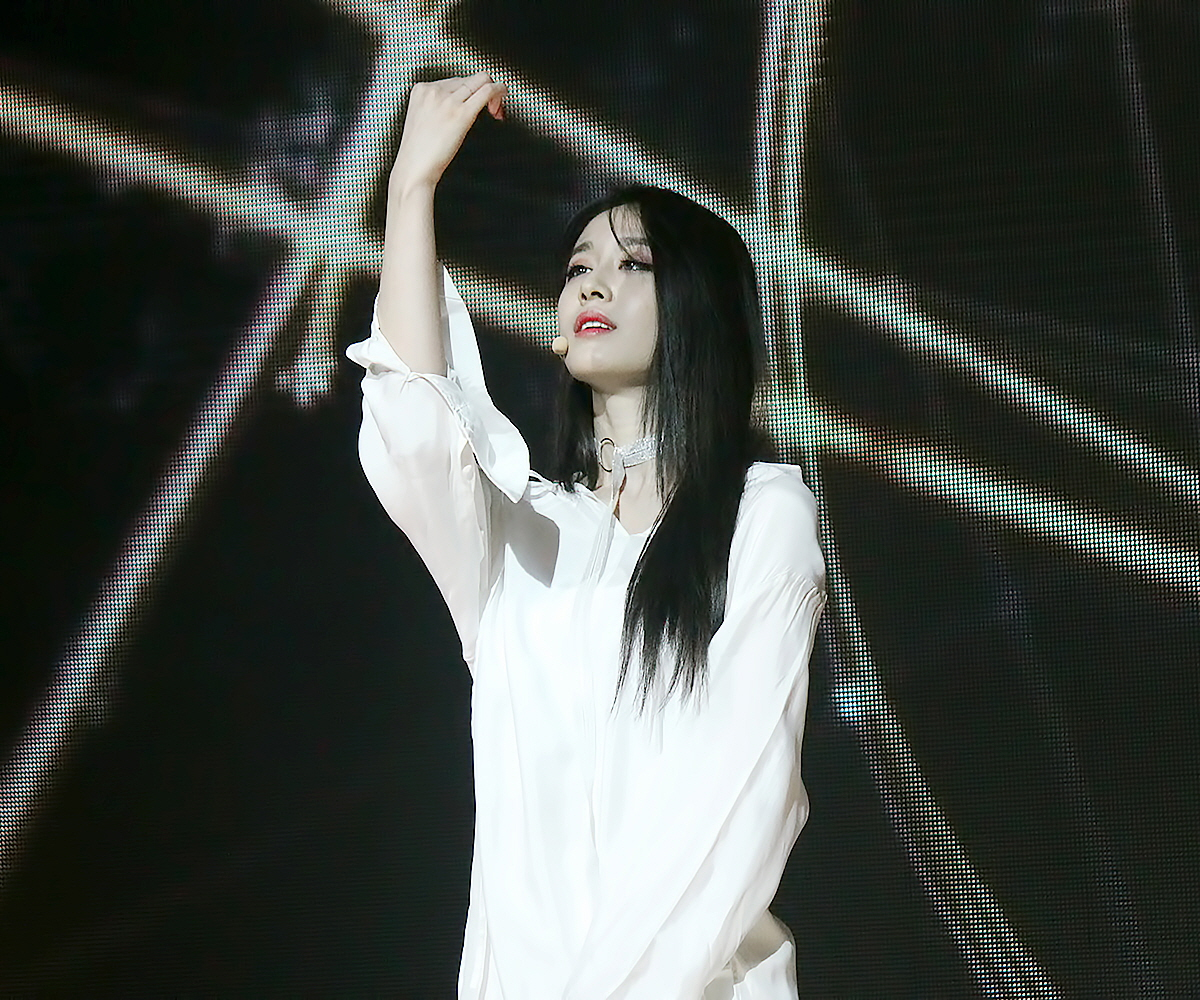
Park performing at T-ara's What's My Name showcase in 2017

=== 2018–present: Continued acting and Senpass ===
In early 2018, Park and her fellow T-ara members departed from MBK Entertainment following the expiration of their contracts. She later signed with Chinese agency Longzhen Culture Development in May 2018. Park and Vietnamese singer Soobin Hoàng Sơn have released music video for their collaboration track, "Between Us" exclusively on VLive, then on YouTube. However, the music video along with the audio video were deleted for unexplained reasons and were never uploaded again. Jiyeon signed with Partners Park in November 2018 for her domestic activities. On November 26, it was revealed that Park would release a digital single in mid December, as a thank you gift for fans. On December 22, 2018, Park released the music video for her winter ballad track "One Day". On April 2, 2019, Park was cast in the KBS2's mystery, romantic comedy drama I Wanna Hear Your Song alongside Yeon Woo-jin, Kim Se-jeong and Song Jae-rim. On December 26, 2019, Park released her second EP SENPASS, a portmanteau of "Sense" and "Compass". The EP consists of five-track including the title track "Take A Hike".

On October 7, 2020, it was announced that actress Park will star in a new web drama called Next Door Witch J. She'll take the role of Seo Je Yi as a beauty creator. In that same month of 2020, the news had been revealed that the actress will star another TV series called Imitation alongside Jung Ji-so, Lee Jun-young, Jeong Yun-ho which will air on KBS2 in the first half of 2021. On July 12, 2021, Park left Partners Park after her contract expired. On February 18, 2022, Park signed an exclusive contract with AnB Group. On July 13, 2022, it was announced that Jiyeon will hold her first solo fan meeting, RE:BLoom at 7 pm on the 30th at Yundang Art Hall. On July 15, it was announced that Jiyeon would be releasing the 2022 version of the song "Rolling", which she sang 12 years ago for the OST of God of Study.

== Artistry ==
Jiyeon is noted for a warm, sweet, and emotional vocal tone, particularly suited to ballads. Her vocals have been described as capable of "drawing listeners into the melodic and emotional atmosphere of a song". Jiyeon's catalog spans various musical styles, including ballads, tango-influenced pop ("First Love"), OST tracks, and cross-national collaborations. Her collaboration on the Vietnamese song "Đẹp nhất là em" (Between Us) showcased her ability to perform in Vietnamese with clear pronunciation.

Her solo debut with Never Ever highlighted a more mature and sensual artistic image, combining singing, choreography, and stage performance.

== Impact ==
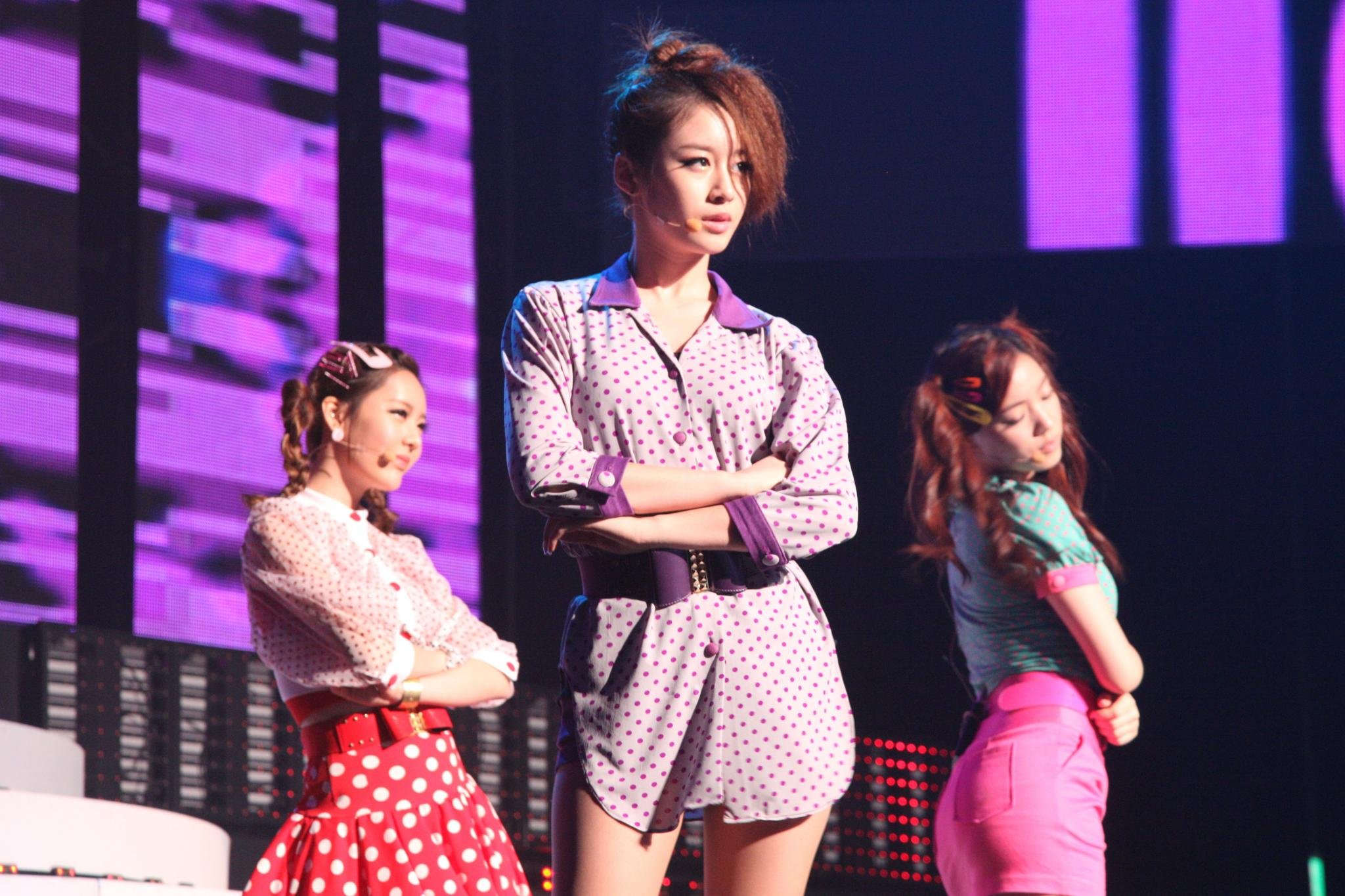
Park performing with T-ara at Cyworld Dream Music Festival in 2011

=== Acting ===
Park became one of the first girl group members of her generation to achieve both nationwide and international success, namely thanks to her acting projects, including God of Study, Death Bell 2, Dream High 2, and Triangle, most of which were licensed and exported overseas. In 2011, Chosun named her as the best acting-idol along with co-star Lee Joon following her first dubbing role in Gnomeo and Juliet. In 2010, Sports Seoul ranked Jiyeon as the second best female idol-actress from expert perspective. In 2011, South Korean producer Kim Kwang Soo stated that Eun-jung and Ji-yeon were the most outstanding idol actors. He noted that although Jiyeon had not received formal acting training as a child, he recognized her potential to become a superstar. He added that casting her in Soul was a strong decision, as it allowed her to work alongside veteran actors and demonstrate her potential.

=== Cultural impact ===
Jiyeon frequently topped the most visited and popular Cyworld pages, a popular social platform at the time, since her debut with hundreds of thousands of weekly views. In September 2011, plastic surgery clinic, Apgujeong Face Line, reported that Jiyeon has been placed first on their survey of the most wanted faces. The same year, she was chosen as the most likable face in a survey conducted among 88 idols. In 2012, Park was chosen again as the most popular female idol in a survey conducted by Regen Plastic Surgery.

Park has been named as role model by several idols, including Kim Hye-in, Rocket Punch, etc. In July 2021, Yeonhee and Yunkyung cited jiyeon as their role-models who inspired them to become idols after watching their performances in their hometown Gwangju. In 2017, Forbes China placed her at twenty-five at its Global Idol Chinese Popularity list.

== Endorsements ==
Shortly after her debut as a singer/actress, Jiyeon was revealed to be a child model who has been active in the industry long before her debut. Jiyeon has modeled for various brands and shopping malls prior to her debut including SMART uniform advertisement for which she won the Model of the Year (Daesang) award in 2008, the commercial featured other k-idols including F(x)'s Victoria, Shinee's Taemin. Park also won the silver award at the APM Model Contest in 2007.

In 2009, Jiyeon was chosen as cover model for the Love Song compilation album, a popular 2000s original soundtrack album which sold over 2,000,000 copies in South Korea alone. Jiyeon was chosen as model again the following year. In 2010, Jiyeon was selected as a public relations ambassador of the National Pension Service by The Ministry of Health and Welfare. According to the national tax service the Ministry of Health and Welfare and affiliated organization, Jiyeon was paid a total of ₩55 million to advertise the service ranking, the highest among female celebrities. In August 2016, Jiyeon worked as an advertising model with a cosmetic brand for about ₩360 million (₩30 million per month), the product was a personalized mask pack. In 2024, Park, along with senior singer Uhm Jung-Hwa, have been selected as muses for "COMEONSTYLE", reportedly the largest shopping festival held by CJ ONSTYLE. The festival will be hosted by both singers in a form of an online show from April 5 to April 14 of the same year.

In 2012, The Voice of The People Newspaper, reported that each of T-ara's member's individual advertising fee is around ₩400 million, one of the highest in the industry.

== Personal life ==
In 2010, Jiyeon revealed that she had been training in Taekwondo since the age of five, with aspirations of becoming both a professional athlete and a Taekwondo instructor. She has also attained a third degree black belt. Jiyeon has frequently demonstrated her Taekwondo abilities on live television programs such as Haha Mong Show, World Changing Quiz, and Radio Star, earning her the nickname "Strong Girl".

On February 10, 2022, Park announced in a handwritten letter via personal SNS that she and baseball player Hwang Jae-gyun will get married in the winter of the same year. They married in a private ceremony on December 10 at Shilla Hotel. The ceremony was attended by the couple's closest family and friends, IU and Lee Hong-ki sang the congratulatory song. According to Chosun, the couple's apartment located in Lotte World Tower, South Korea's tallest tower and 6th in the world, is worth ₩37B (approximately $28M), the most expensive reported celebrity house of all time in the country. A house-tour episode of the apartment aired on May 29 on tvN's Doctor Freehan.

After months of speculation, on October 5, 2024, it was officially announced that after nearly two years of marriage, Park and Hwang had separated and mutually agreed to divorce. Through a statement released by Park's legal representative, it was confirmed that the couple had filed for divorce and come to the decision due to irreconcilable differences. Park also personally confirmed the news in a statement through her legal representative.

== Philanthropy ==
In 2015, Jiyeon participated in "Arbor Day Campaign" along with Shannon, Speed, The SeeYa and Son Ho-jun. In 2016, Park participated in the "Support Women Comfort" campaign. In remembrance of Sewol ferry disaster, all proceeds were donated to House of Sharing Foundation.

== Theatre ==
Year	Title	Role	Ref.
2012	Our Youth, Roly Poly Musical	Han Joo-young	

== Accolades ==
=== Awards and nominations ===
Name of the award ceremony, year presented, award category, nominated work and the result of the nomination
Award	Year	Category	Nominated work	Result	Ref.
APM Model Contest	2007	Silver Award	Herself	Won	
Baeksang Arts Awards	2010	Popularity Award – Film	Death Bell 2: Bloody Camp	Nominated	
Baeksang Arts Awards	2011	Popularity Award – Television	Master of Study	Nominated	
Baeksang Arts Awards	2012	Popularity Award – Television	Dream High 2	Nominated	
Baidu Entertainment Awards	2015	Popular Artist Award	Herself	Nominated	
Bugs Music Awards	2010	Variety Star Award	Heroes	Nominated	
DramaFever Awards	2012	Best Ensemble Cast	Dream High 2	Nominated	
DramaFever Awards	2012	Best Soundtrack	Superstar	Won	
Cable TV Broadcast Awards	2015	Cable TV Star Award	The Show	Won	
China Powerstar Awards	2017	Most Influential Female Foreign Artist	Herself	Nominated	
China Powerstar Awards	2018	Most Influential Female Foreign Artist	Herself	Nominated	
China Powerstar Awards	2019	Most Influential Female Foreign Artist	Herself	Nominated	
Drama Beans Awards	2010	Best Use of an Idol Star	Master of Study	Nominated	
Gaon Chart Music Awards	2014	Social Star Award	Never Ever	Nominated	
KBS Drama Awards	2010	Best New Actress	Master of Study	Nominated	
KBS Drama Awards	2010	Best Couple Award (With Yoo Seung-ho)	Master of Study	Nominated	
KU Awards	2014	Most Hateful Character	Triangle	Nominated	
KU Awards	2014	Best Kiss (With Yim Si-wan)	Triangle	Won	
Melon Music Awards	2009	Song of the Year – Daesang	"Women's Generation"	Nominated	
Melon Music Awards	2009	Mobile Music Award	"Women's Generation"	Nominated	
Mnet 20's Choice Award	2010	Most Influential Artist	Herself	Nominated	
Mnet Media Awards	2010	Most Cute and Gorgeous Lady	Heroes	Nominated	
National Pension Service	2010	Talent Ambassador	Herself	Won	
SBS Entertainment Award	2010	Best Teamwork	Heroes	Won	
Seoul Music Awards	2014	Bonsang Award	Never Ever	Nominated	
Seoul Music Awards	2014	Popularity Award	Never Ever	Nominated	
Seoul Music Awards	2014	Hallyu Special Award	Never Ever	Nominated	
Seoul International Drama Awards	2012	Best Popular OST	Superstar	Nominated	
Seoul International Youth Film Festival	2014	Best Young Actress	Triangle	Nominated	
Smart Model Contest	2008	Model of the Year – Daesang	Herself	Won	
Yahoo Asia Multiverse Buzz Awards	2010	Most Popular Asian İdol	Herself	Nominated	
Yahoo Asia Multiverse Buzz Awards	2015	Most Popular Asian İdol	Herself	Nominated	
YinYueTai V-Chart Awards	2015	Best Female Singer	Never Ever	Won	
YinYueTai V-Chart Awards	2015	Favorite Artist of the Year	Never Ever	Nominated	
YouTube Creator Awards	2020	Silver Button	Herself	Won	

=== Listicles ===
Publisher	Year	List	Rank	Ref.
Sports Seoul	2010	Idol-Actor Ranking from Expert Perspective	8th	
Pops in Seoul	2012	Best Idol-Actors	4th	
The Chosun Ilbo	2012	Best Acting-Idols According to Experts	7th	
The Korea Times	2015	Female Singers to Watch out for in 2015	First	
Forbes China	2017	Global Idol Chinese Popularity Ranking	25th	
