= Hanlim Arts School =

High school in Seoul, South Korea

Hanlim Arts School 한림연예예술고등학교
- Seoul; South Korea

Information
- Gender: coed
- Website: http://www.hlyes.hs.kr/

Korean name
- Hangul: 한림연예예술고등학교
- Hanja: 韓林演藝藝術高等學校
- RR: Hallim yeonye yesul godeunghakgyo
- MR: Hallim yŏnye yesul kodŭnghakkyo

Hanlim Arts School (Korean: 한림연예예술고등학교) is an arts high school located in Songpa District, Seoul, South Korea. It is known as one of the schools attended by current and future members of the South Korean entertainment industry, alongside the School of Performing Arts Seoul and Lila Art High School.

== Overview ==
The idea of establishing Hanlim School was shown in 2008 by Lee Hyeon-man (이현만), the first principal. It was established and started recruiting students in 2009. The school has six departments, which are: Acting, Fashion Model, Film Making, Musical Theatre, Dance, and Music.

After Lee Hyeon-man died in 2020, Hanlim Arts School announced it would suspend admissions due to legal considerations: The school was operated under the Lifelong Education Act, which requires institutions founded by individuals to become legal entities upon the individuals' death. A public petition gathering thousands of signatures urged the Seoul government to address the issue. On 21 June 2021, the Seoul government approved the school's transformation into a legal entity, resolving the legal issue and ensuring its continued operation.

== Notable alumni ==
Hanlim gained attention for years for the fame of some of its students, especially during graduation ceremonies. In 2021, Yonhap News Agency describes the school as "Idol academy" (아이돌 사관학교).
