= Kim Ji-soo (singer, born 1990) =

South Korean singer (born 1990)

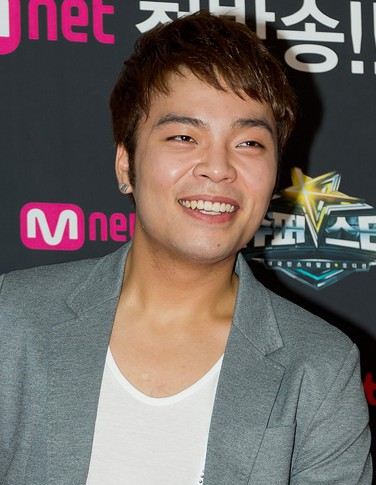
- Kim in 2011

Background information
- Born: February 5, 1990 (age 36); South Korea
- Genres: Pop; folk
- Occupations: Singer-songwriter; musician
- Instruments: Vocals; guitar; classical guitar; djembe
- Years active: 2010–present
- Label: Shofar Music

Kim Ji-soo (born February 5, 1990) is a South Korean singer-songwriter and musician.

== Career ==
Born in Cheongju, Korea, Jisoo grew up listening to music of various musicians such as Kim Gun-mo and Jason Mraz and majored music at Daebul University. In 2010, he appeared on Superstar K2, a singing competition on M.net. During the competition, he got famous by singing 'Chocolate Drive' by Moida band and 'Cinderella' by Seo In-Young with Jaein Jang in an acoustic version. He made to the 6th place. In 2011, Jisoo signed with his 1st recording label, Shofar music , and released his first extended play in the same year. In 2012, Jisoo portrayed Park Hong Joo, on Dream High Season 2, a television drama from KBS. In 2012, Jisoo released his second extended play, and he wrote 5 out of 6 songs on it.

== Discography ==
=== Studio albums ===
Title	Album details	Peak chart positions	Sales
Title	Album details	KOR	Sales
A Beautiful Love	Released: July 17, 2013; Label: Shofar Music; Format: CD, digital download	61	

=== Extended plays ===
Title	Album details	Peak chart positions	Sales
Title	Album details	KOR	Sales
1st Mini Album	Released: May 17, 2011; Label: Shofar Music; Format: CD, digital download	—	
Vintage Man	Released: May 30, 2012; Label: Shofar Music; Format: CD, digital download	39	
Sensitive A.M	Released: September 9, 2014; Label: Shofar Music; Format: CD, digital download	—	
Young Beggar (청춘거지)	Released: February 17, 2015; Label: Shofar Music; Format: CD, digital download	—	
A Dream	Released: March 3, 2017; Label: Shofar Music; Format: CD, digital download	85	
Drawing Your Name	Released: September 8, 2020; Label: Shofar Music; Format: CD, digital download	—	
"—" denotes release did not chart.

=== Singles ===
Title	Year	Peak chart positions	Sales	Album
Title	Year	KOR	Sales	Album
"Erased You" (널 지우는 일)	2010	12		Non-album single
"Chocolate Drive"	2011	51	KOR: 204,940	1st Mini Album
"Miss You So" (너무 그리워)	2011	49	KOR: 221,706	1st Mini Album
"Friday" (Remix version)	2011	—	KOR: 59,417	1st Mini Album
"Fall Is Coming" (가을이 오네요)	2011	39	KOR: 303,123	Non-album singles
"Better" (더 좋아) (with Taru)	2012	63	KOR: 141,831	Non-album singles
"Sunflower" (해바라기)	2012	—		Vintage Man
"Vintage Man"	2012	—	KOR: 39,593	Vintage Man
"Sunglass" (썬글라스) (with Vanilla Acoustic)	2012	—		Non-album single
"Love, The Lie" (사랑, 그건 거짓말)	2012	70	KOR: 116,862	A Beautiful Love
"Kimbap" (김밥) (with Jang Jae-in)	2013	75	KOR: 60,481	Non-album single
"Don't Let Me Go"	2013	72	KOR: 43,009	A Beautiful Love
"Please"	2013	—	KOR: 22,750	A Beautiful Love
"5 Minutes More" (5분만 더 자)	2013	—	KOR: 20,244	A Beautiful Love
"I Have Someone Who Comforts Me" (편한 사람이 생겼어) (with Sunga)	2013	—		Non-album single
"I'm Telling You" (말하고 있어) (feat. Sweden Laundry)	2014	—	KOR: 16,010	Sensitive A.M
"We're On The Moon" (여기는 달)	2014	91	KOR: 19,779	Sensitive A.M
"Lonely Only You"	2014	—		Sensitive A.M
"A Man's Confession" (상남자의 고백) (with Bolbbalgan4)	2014	—		Young Beggar
"Song of 8 Year Solitary Life" (자취 8년생의 노래)	2015	—		Young Beggar
"Chicken and Beer" (치킨에 맥주)	2015	—		Non-album singles
"Bangkok, and You" (방콕, 그대와) (with Kim Greem)	2015	—		Non-album singles
"That's Not" (그건 아니래)	2015	—		Non-album singles
"Romantic Wish" (with Vanilla Acoustic, Sweden Laundry, Kim Sarang, Letter Flow, Bolbbalgan4)	2016	—		Shofar Music Compilation Vol. 2
"Rain&U" (feat. G2)	2016	—		Non-album single
"Dream All Day"	2017	—		A Dream
"Regret" (반성)	2017	—		Non-album singles
"Favorite"	2017	—		Non-album singles
"SHE" (그대가 안아준다면, 그 어떤 것도 날 춥게 할 수 없습니다)	2018	—		Non-album singles
"Awkward" (어색한 사이) (with Bolbbalgan4, Letter Flow, WH3N, Choi Yu Ree, Boramiyu, 20 Years of Age, Vanilla Acoustic, Sweden Laundry)	2020	116		Shofar Music Compilation Vol. 3
"Sweety"	2020	—		Drawing Your Name
"Alone Again"	2020	—		Drawing Your Name
"—" denotes release did not chart.

=== Soundtrack appearances ===
Title	Year	Peak chart positions	Sales	Album
Title	Year	KOR	Sales	Album
"Young Man" (어린 아저씨)	2010	63		Superstar K 2 Up To 11
"When Love Passes By" (사랑이 지나가면)	2010	92		Superstar K 2 Up To 11
"Cinderella" (신데렐라) (with Jang Jae-in)	2010	42		Superstar K 2 Up To 11
"I'll Stay" (같이 살자) (with Park Bo-ram)	2011	37		Yacha Meets Superstar K 2
"We Are The B" (B급 인생) (with Jinwoon, Kang So-ra, Jr.)	2012	13	KOR: 631,490	Dream High 2 OST
"Chance"	2013	—		Incarnation of Money OST
"I'll Cry"	2016	—		Choco Bank OST
"Stay With Me"	2017	—		Manhole OST
"—" denotes release did not chart.

== Filmography ==
- Persevere, Goo Hae-ra (Mnet, 2015)
- Monstar (tvN/Mnet, 2013) cameo
- Dream High 2 (KBS2, 2012)

== Awards and nominations ==
Year	Award-Giving Body	Category	Work	Result
2011	Mnet Asian Music Awards	Best New Male Artist	"Miss You So"	Nominated
