= Kim Won-jun =

South Korean pop singer and actor

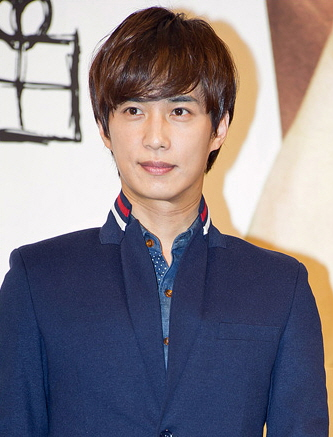
- Kim in 2012
- Born: February 16, 1973 (age 53); Seoul, South Korea
- Other names: Kim Won-joon; Dearro
- Education: Seoul Institute of the Arts – Film; Seoul Digital University – Digital Design; Sangmyung University Graduate School of Culture Technology – Master's degree in Music Technology
- Occupations: Singer; actor
- Years active: 1992–present
- Agent: Hunus Entertainment
- Spouse: Unknown (m. 2016)
- Children: 2

Korean name
- Hangul: 김원준
- Hanja: 金元俊
- RR: Gim Wonjun
- MR: Kim Wŏnjun
- Website: kimwonjun.com

Kim Won-jun (Korean: 김원준; born February 16, 1973), also known as Dearro (Korean: 대로), is a South Korean pop singer and actor.

== Career and personal life ==
After graduating from the film department of Seoul Institute of the Arts, Kim began his career as a K-pop solo artist in 1992, and made his acting debut in 1994. As a solo artist, Kim released nine albums, four digital singles, and one compilation album. He was also a member of the bands V.E.I.L (which released two albums and one EP) and M4 (which released one album and two EPs).

As an actor, Kim has starred in both television dramas (such as My Husband Got a Family) and musical theatre.

In 2011, he appeared on the third season of reality show We Got Married, where he was paired with actress Park So-hyun.

Kim also works as a professor of applied music at Soongsil University, Daegu Arts University and Gangdong College (in Eumseong County).

In 2016, he married a lawyer.

== Discography ==
=== Solo artist ===
==== Album ====
- [1992] 모두 잠든 후에 (In the Dead of the Night)
- [1993] 나에게 떠나는 여행 (Journey for Myself)
- [1994] 너 없는 동안 (While You Were Not Here)
- [1995] Dear
- [1996] Best Album
- [1996] Show
- [1997] One
- [1998] Self Destruction
- [2000] Another 8000
- [2001] Dearro Nine

==== Digital single ====
- [2009] 나스럽게 ("Like Myself")
- [2011] 니가 뭔데 ("Who Do You Think You Are?"; insert song in We Got Married)
- [2012] 러브콜 ("Love Call")
- [2012] "Crazy" (from My Husband Got a Family OST)

==== Featured artist ====
- [1994] 세상은 나에게 ("The World Is to Me"; track from The Blue Sky OST)
- [2000] "Hellow" (track from RNA OST)
- [2000] "Turn" (track from RNA OST)
- [2002] 내 사랑 울보 ("My Love Crybaby"; track from Legend: Jeon Young-rok 30th Anniversary Tribute Album)
- [2006] "Finale" (duet with Park Hye-kyung in her album Yesterday)
- [2012] "Crazy" (duet with Park Mi-kyung in My Husband Got a Family OST)
- [2012] "Don't Stop the Music" (track from My Husband Got a Family OST)

=== V.E.I.L ===
- [2006] V.E.I.L
- [2007] Lesson 01
- [2008] 1.5 Lesson Completed

=== M4 ===
- [2011] The Sto.ry of M4
- [2012] 2nd Mini Album

== Filmography ==
=== Television series ===
- The Blue Sky (KBS2, 1995)
- RNA (KBS2, 2000)
- Scent of a Man (MBC, 2003)
- Garden of Eve (SBS, 2003)
- Drama City "Spaghetti Dating" (KBS2, 2005)
- Stormy Lovers (MBC, 2010)
- The Wedding Scheme (tvN, 2012)
- My Husband Got a Family (KBS2, 2012)
- My Love from the Star (SBS, 2013) (cameo, ep 21)

=== Film ===
- Sun of Fire (1994)
- Sunset on the Neon Lights (1995) (cameo)
- Baby Alone (2002) (cameo)
- Bewitching Attraction (2006)

=== Variety show ===
- TV Gayo 20 (1994)
- Radio Star (2008/2010)
- Fervent Force (2010)
- We Got Married Season 3 (2011)
- Top Magic (2012)
- The Last Audition of My Life ( 2012–2013)
- Let's Go World – Alaska (2013)
- Law of the Jungle in Savanna ( 2013)
- Big Brother Era (2023)

== Musical theatre ==
- Radio Star (2008)
- Jack the Ripper (2009)
- Radio Star (2010)
- Sherlock Holmes (2011)
- Sherlock Holmes and the Secret Weapon (2012)
- Rock of Ages (2012–2013)
- Healing Heart Season 3: The Man with Many Tails (2013)

== Radio program ==
- FM Inkigayo (KBS 2FM)
- Kim Won-jun's Magic in the World
