= We Got Married season 3 =

2008 South Korean TV series

WGM Season 3 Logo

We Got Married (Korean: 우리 결혼했어요) is a South Korean reality-variety show and segment of MBC's Sunday Sunday Night program. First broadcast in 2008, the show pairs up Korean celebrities to show what life would be like if they were married. Each week, couples are assigned missions to complete, with candid interviews of the participants to reveal their thoughts and feelings.

== Format ==
With a new format and slightly different couples, newlyweds are given a mission to complete each week. As during the special pilot episode, interviewed participants provide a unique perspective on the ongoing relationship conflicts and developments. All of the recorded material is then played in front of the participants, MCs, and audience who add commentary or clarification.

Season three officially began on April 9, with two additional couples upon the departure of Yonghwa & Seohyun, as well as a new format. Park Hwi Sun and K.Will were added for Season 3 to the cast as MCs. In September 2011, new couple Leeteuk of Super Junior and actress Kang So-ra joined the cast with their first episode airing on 24 September with guest appearances by fellow Super Junior members, Eunhyuk, Donghae, Kyuhyun and Sungmin; who continue to guest star for a few more episodes.

On 14 May 2012, the show was temporarily cancelled, due to the long-running MBC strike, it was replaced by reruns and other special programs. The programme resumed on 16 June 2012, with production by an outside source. On 20 August 2012 the production team announced the departure of Ham Eun-jung of T-ara and Lee Jang-woo, with their last broadcast episode aired on 25 August. They were replaced with new couple Julien Kang and Yoon Se-ah.

In September 2012, new couple Lee Joon of MBLAQ and Oh Yeon-seo replaced departing couple Leeteuk and Kang So-ra. Their last episode was broadcast on 8 September as Leeteuk enlisted to serve his mandatory military service on 30 October 2012.

== Couples ==
- Nichkhun & Victoria (Ep 1-24)
- Eunjung & Lee Jang-woo (Ep 1-55)
- Park So-hyun & Kim Won-jun (Ep 1-40)

=== Additional couples ===
- David Oh & Kwon Ri-se (Ep 11–24)
- Leeteuk & Kang So-ra (Ep 25–55)
- Julien Kang & Yoon Se-ah (Ep 54–55)

== Episode summaries ==
Ep	Date aired	Notes
1	9 April 2011	Nichkhun disappointed because Victoria does not complete the mission he gives last week. Victoria apologizes to Nichkhun by performing Sorry Sorry dances outside their house. Khuntoria are given the mission as magazine reporter to introduce Korean food in a Worldwide travel-orientated magazine. The two new couples: Eunjung from T-ara & Lee Jang Woo and Park So Hyun & Kim Won Jun met for the first time.
2	16 April 2011	Khuntoria continue the mission for the Worldwide Travel Magazine and enlist Chansung's (2PM) help. The Woojung couple continue their date by the Han River and Jang Woo serenades Eunjung. The Brave Couple continues their Wedding Ceremony hosted by the members of M4. They also have the challenge from K.Will (the wedding singer) to kiss on the cheek whenever he sings the word 'present.' They also go out to drink after the ceremony and revelations come undone by their friends. They also ask each other what the other wants most in the new marriage.
3	23 April 2011	Nichkhun invites Lee Yong-dae, a famous badminton player over, and Victoria invites Sulli. Since it is Sulli's birthday, Khuntoria left to buy food from the market leaving Yong-dae and Sulli alone in the house. The Brave Couple get a mission to go back in time to when they first met in 1993 and go on a date together at an amusement park, while fulfilling five missions. The Woojung couple head to Jang Woo's second house where they play a game of darts to decide where they will go next time.
4	30 April 2011	Khuntoria meets Cha Yuri at the mart. Victoria gets jealous when Nichkhun says that was the woman who film a kiss scene in the CF with him. Woojung couple have their first vacation together to Yeong Deok. Brave Couple continues their date at the amusement park, fulfilling the five missions that need to be done.
5	7 May 2011	Khuntoria cooked special for Sulli's birthday. After that, they play badminton and "Disco Pang Pang" game together. Woojung couple enjoys their leisure time together outside the capsule house while drinking coffee personally made by Jang Woo. They watching a movie that compile of Eunjung's footage made by Jang Woo and play games together. Brave Couple spends their honeymoon in Cebu, Philippines, while Won Joon has an M4 Concert. They take photos at the villa they are staying in and also play at the pool, even with So Hyun trying to parody Secret Garden but ending up failing since Won Joon is not very familiar with the drama.
6	14 May 2011	Khuntoria are given the mission to throw the first ball in the opening game of the pro baseball season at the Jamsil Baseball Stadium. Woojung go to their school together and Eunjung introduces her friend to her husband. They attend the class together. In the class, Eunjung sings together with Jaemin with the "gesture" that makes Jang Woo feel uneasy. The Brave couple are still experiencing the joys of their honeymoon, even going para-sailing. After the M4 Concert, Won Joon takes So Hyun to a restaurant, where he creates a romantic atmosphere with a lovely dinner and even music.
7	21 May 2011	Continuation from last week, Khuntoria are given the mission "Kiss Time Event" at the Jamsil Baseball Stadium. At the college, Woojung have lunch with their friends. Eunjung and Jaemin plan to make her husband jealous. Jang Woo's annoyed at how close his wife is with another man. Things turn out when Jaemin reveals the plan, Jang Woo and Jaemin pretend that they were fighting and that makes her feel sad. At the end, they get the mission card to go to their new house. Brave Couple finish their romantic dinner with Won Joon getting him and So Hyun couple watches, along with presenting her with a diamond ring asking her to accept his love. They also spend the rest of the day doing a hopping tour and also talk about what happens once they return to Korea to officially start their married life.
8	28 May 2011	Nichkhun wants to surprise Victoria by cooking Chinese food before her comeback. Miss A comes to Khuntoria's house as Nichkhun invites them to help him cook. Woojung reveals a mobile home as their first house. Jang Woo asks Eunjung to cook for the first time at their new house. They go to the mart to buy things to cook and decorations to decorate their new house. Upon returning to Korea, the Brave Couple is given the mission to do some last checks on the things that they want to know about each other and to confirm some things. Won Joon takes So Hyun to his house and shows him around, while So Hyun looks for marks regarding his past with other women, while Won Joon wants to meet some of his wife's friends who can tell stories about her.
9	4 June 2011	Khuntoria get the mission to take part in a romantic movie "Eat, Jump, Love". They went to do Bungee Jumping. Jang Woo tells Eunjung that he will do everything as she wishes on that day. So, they go to the theme park with a spa and Jang Woo wishes to play Churro Kiss Game. The Brave Couple have lunch with So Hyun's friend Mi Sun, who Won Joon had invited, but Mi Sun also brought along Ryu Si-won, who is a close friend to Won Joon. Together, the friends tell the newlywed couple about living together and marriage itself, along with how they should handle situations, with some jokes in the middle. Later, the Brave Couple receives a mission to go find their newlywed house themselves.
10	11 June 2011	Khuntoria are unable to do the bungee jumping successfully because Victoria is too afraid. Woojung couple enjoy the warm spa. Eunjung wants to see how good Jang Woo's swimming skills are. Eunjung wishes her husband to dry her hair and make a self prepared meal. Brave Couple move into their new home, with So Hyun asking K.Will and Kim Hyung Jun to help her prepare a surprise for Won Joon, only for Won Joon to run into Hyung Jun at the elevator, but then realize nothing about the surprise. They later receive a mission to pick the five 'must haves' of a wedding house.
11	18 June 2011	Khuntoria film a Caribbean Bay CF together with the rest of 2PM, and play a game with the 2PM members. Khuntoria gets on a wedding decorated bus. Woojung couple went to a herb farm. Eunjung asks Jang Woo for a "foot massage". The Brave Couple go shopping with the five marriage coupons with an original list in mind, however, once they get there, their list changes and ends up leaning towards all of the items that So Hyun wanted to buy. Although, in order to buy the items, So Hyun has to say 'Oppa, this' to Won Joon.
12	25 June 2011	Khuntoria celebrate their 1-year anniversary in a bus and have their first wedding photo shoot. Brave Couple spend their first night in their newlywed home, rearranging the furniture and even doing newlywed things such as brushing their teeth together and having the wife apply facial cleaners. So Hyun then tries to parody Secret Garden again, but ends up failing, once again. However, Won Joon attempts the 'foam kiss,' but also ends up failing. So Hyun then reveals the surprise that she has prepared for her husband, which results in him being very touched.
13	2 July 2011	Continuation from last week's episode, Khuntoria share their first kiss during their photo shoot. So Hyun invites Kim Sook and Lizzy (After School) to help her in creating lunchboxes for Won Joon and the rest of the M4 crew at the M4 concert, with So Hyun even remembering about his wish that they had asked on first day they met, after their wedding ceremony. Later, when So Hyun visits Won Joon in the waiting room with Won Joon then becoming disappointed thinking that So Hyun has come empty handed.
14	9 July 2011	So Hyun aids in Won Joon in helping to tell the others that she prepared lunch boxes. After they eat, it is then time for the concert, to which they exchange hidden signals to look out for. After the concert is completed, Won Joon prepares another surprise event for his wife at the concert venue. Khuntoria plans a wedding ceremony and parodies the kiss charge scene in The Greatest Love. They invite both 2PM and f(x) members and even though the whole of 2PM comes, only Amber is able to make it from f(x).
15	16 July 2011	Continuation of last week's episode, Khuntoria completes their wedding ceremony and Nichkhun gives Victoria a heartfelt letter. After the ceremony, Khuntoria boards a yacht to have time alone and Victoria gives Nichkhun a surprise gift. Won Joon then presents his solo concert for his wife, So Hyun, singing and dancing, singing to her while playing the piano and presenting her with a rose ending with So Hyun being touched to tears. They then travel to a health clinic because So Hyun was concerned about Won Joon's health since he had recently had a concert. While on the train, Won Joon presents So Hyun with the three-tier lunch box again that's filled with fruits and vegetables since So Hyun is not a big breakfast person. They later play games on the train that they played when they were students going on trips and singing songs.
16	23 July 2011	Khuntoria is given the mission: "To cultivate a couple hobby". They decide to go play pool and Nichkhun prides himself on being 'the king of pool'. However, Victoria surprises him by being quite good at the game. The Brave Couple arrive at the health clinic. They go through a series of tests to check on their health through a specific Chinese treatment. Through the series of tests, it is shown that So Hyun's body is not as healthy as Won Joon's making him happy. It turns out that by looking at the age of the blood vessels, that So Hyun is deemed to be 80 years old. During their meeting with the physician, they learn about this physique personality, with So Hyun being the 'less yang' type, which is easily touched, cares more about other peoples' business, and neglects themselves and their own family, while Won Joon being a 'too yin' type, which the physician said is a great match for the 'less yang' people. Afterwards, they have lunch and plan a date for which So Hyun wants to ride a couple bike.
17	30 July 2011	Continuation of last week's mission, Khuntoria decides to plant lettuce and chilli peppers but Nichkhun is not too fond of the idea. After planting the vegetables and eating dinner, Khuntoria gives each other a manicure, and jokingly confirms their new couple hobby to be giving each other manicures. The Brave Couple goes on their date and So Hyun gets her wished fulfilled to ride a couple bike. They then head out on a duck boat to complete her perfect date and they then go into a hot air balloon. Later, at their home, Won Joon posts the reports from the health checkup on their wall so that So Hyun will have the motivation to exercise. They follow along to an exercise video until So Hyun is then worried about Won Joon's nieces coming to visit, which they are already on their way. While So Hyun was cutting the fruits, the doorbell rang and the nieces then arrived.
18	6 August 2011	Khuntoria visits Tiger JK and Yoon Mi-rae's home and prepares kimchi for them. At the end of the episode, they were given a mission to "Make memories with Jordan", Tiger JK and Tasha's 4-year-old son. For the Brave Couple, it is the first time that So Hyun is meeting her in-laws, with Won Joon's nieces, which she didn't even know that he had. During the first introductions, Won Joon is also nervous on how to introduce them, but his nieces break the silence by saying 'Aunt-in-law' which Won Joon finds shocking since his nieces grew up in America and their knowledge of Korean culture is quite shallow. The nieces also prepared a present for So Hyun, giving her cereal hoping that she'd eat breakfast in the morning. So Hyun also prepared a gift for the nieces, by giving them both signed Girls' Generation CDs. After eating, they then decide to go out shopping since the nieces will be leaving for America within a few days. They then stop to get some snacks on the street before going shoe shopping to which So Hyun says that she will buy them a pair as a gift. Won Joon then objects to all of the shoes that they try on, saying that he thinks that they're too sexy, and pick out shoes that are old fashioned for the girls to wear. They then venture into a museum that has things from the past and they dress up in old school uniforms and even eat lunch boxes in an old school room. However, there is something that the nieces are curious about.
19	13 August 2011	Continuation of the previous mission, Khuntoria tries their best to be good 'parents' to Jordan but is finding it difficult. Nichkhun however, slowly gets closer to Jordan, neglecting Victoria and thus, making her jealous and wanting attention. At the end of the day, they go home and enjoy wine with ice-cream and a foot bath and is given a new mission. For the Brave Couple, the nieces are having a casual conversation and even asking how many boyfriends did So Hyun have before Won Joon. So Hyun then attacks Won Joon by saying that he had many more girlfriends than she had boyfriends. They then get around to what they were curious about and wanted to ask, which was when they are going to have kids, but they said it in English because they were too afraid to say it. So Hyun then draws a family tree to know the family better, the nieces then take the notebook and draw six children (three boys and three girls) underneath of Won Joon and So Hyun. They then go to karaoke and have a good time with the nieces before they leave. Later, the couple tries to find something to do that they have in common, they try dancing and playing the piano, but nothing turns out to be right for them.
20	20 August 2011	Khuntoria's new mission is to enjoy a romantic holiday getaway in Maldives! Upon reaching Maldives, Khuntoria has some fun but their spirits are dampened when they find out their new mission: " To be friendly guides for the visitors". The Brave Couple try to give a couple activity a try, which picked out by Won Joon, is sewing. They then decide to make things for each other, Won Joon will make So Hyun a purse and So Hyun will make Won Joon pajama pants. Won Joon then persists to buying a sewing machine since he finds them interesting and entertaining. The couple then has a race to see who can finish sewing the fastest, with So Hyun being speedy, but Won Joon being careful, making sure to get everything right. Won Joon finishes first, even though his sewing machine broke in the middle, with So Hyun still trying to figure out how to close the pants, which Won Joon fixes in no time.
21	27 August 2011	As guides to the visitors at the resort, Khuntoria does a series of activities from power-walking to sailing to making cocktails. They have a bet to see whose cocktail is more popular, with the loser having to carry(piggy-back) the other back to their room. After the sewing lesson, the Brave Couple go to the market to buy something for dinner. They then agree on something with seafood and being to search around, even playing with a king crab and finding a store called So Hyun Seafood. Once they're home, Won Joon finds out that it's So Hyun's first time making seafood stew. During dinner, Won Joon calles Kim Min-jong to ask about the relationship between him and So Hyun, to which Minjong makes jokes about them not getting divorced yet, about So Hyun coming over to his house without Won Joon, and how Won Joon should doubt their relationship. They then get into a fight about Won Joon's kiss scene in his drama since So Hyun believes that it was requested by Won Joon. Won Joon then decides to call the director to clear things up, to which the director says that Won Joon requested it. After becoming angry, Won Joon then goes to the sewing machine in the living room and begins to sew in frustration. Won Joon gets another call, but that is also bad for him and also results in another little couple fight about the kiss scene. In the end, Won Joon goes back to his sewing machine.
22	3 September 2011	Nichkhun wins the cocktail bet and Victoria piggy-backs him along the beach. They then rehearse for the night activity which is essentially a party. They dance to f(x)'s "Hot Summer" and 2PM's "Hands Up" and play couple games along with the rest of the guests. After returning to the room, they are given a new mission, "To enjoy the last day in Maldives" much to the delight of Victoria. The Brave Couple goes on a mini vacation with Kim Jin-pyo and Yoo Joon Ryun and their two small children, for which So Hyun and Won Joon brought toys to play with them. They then play with the kids for a while, with the kids even riding on Cornie's back. Both couples then have fun going onto the jetski, to which Jin Pyo and Joon Ryun told their son that they are going to catch a crocodile so he wouldn't get upset and cry the whole time they were gone. They then go to play water games where Won Joon gets pushed into the water, and then later Jin Pyo. Won Joon then makes a bet with Jin Pyo saying that if any of the other adults are able to get across the water bridge, he will quit smoking, with Won Joon ending up making it to the other end.
23	10 September 2011	The Khuntoria couple headed to the beach, where they enjoyed their time snorkeling and shooting wedding photos by themselves due to unsatisfied with the results from the professional photographer. Due to the restricted height of the tripod, the couple constantly had to crouch down to meet the camera's range. Consequently, they earned themselves a new couple name: the "split legs" couple. The Brave Couple is still enjoying their vacation While they are eating, Jin Pyo talks about Won Joon's aegyo on the phone with his ex-girlfriends, which So Hyun says that she never received any aegyo from him. Won Joon and So Hyun then try to convince Jin Pyo and Joon Ryun to leave their children with them while they go off on their date, to which they finally agree to. The time with the children starts off well, however turns for the worse when dinner is being made and it turns into a dough and flour fight. In the end, Jin Pyo and Joon Ryun clean up the living room for Won Joon and So Hyun and let them rest.
24	17 September 2011	The Khuntoria and KwonOh couples spend their last day together as a married couple. Nichkhun and Victoria held a farewell party to their 456th day of marriage. Those that attended the party included badminton player Lee Yong-dae and Victoria's fellow f(x) members Sulli, Luna, and Amber. During the party, Nichkhun presented Victoria with a special gift, who couldn't hold back her tears at the thought of ending their marriage. The tears had a particularly profound impact, as it was the first time that Victoria showed tears in front of her husband. Afterwards, the couple finally ended their virtual marriage of 1 year and 3 months at the 63 Building, where the two had first met. They also reflected on their past 456 days of memories and seemed it was difficult for them to let go. The Brave Couple goes to a non-flowering and fruitless agricultural farm where they pick figs—which are actually flowers. After eating lunch, they decide to learn how to make fig jam so they can use it as their housewarming gift for their guests. They then travel to the F1 Racing Track where they are able to go around on the course in a sports car with racing gear on. The two then have a bet that whoever loses to the other one, as in whoever doesn't get the fastest time, they will have to prepare the food for the housewarming party.
25	24 September 2011	The Brave Couple meet in the morning at their house and eat breakfast. So Hyun then gets a package of a toy car that she had ordered using Won Joon's card. Later Won Joon then suggests making clothes for Cornie since its getting cold, to which he pulls a lot of cloth out of a bag. The couple then receives their very first mission card since they were married, to create a unique family motto. They decide to draw pictures of each other as practice, and then finally decide to start working on their family picture. Also, there is a new couple - Super Junior's Leeteuk and Kang So-ra. After Leeteuk announces on stage that he is going to get married and gives out wedding invitations to other celebrities, the two meet in an empty theatre with other Super Junior members (Eunhyuk, Donghae, Kyuhyun and Sungmin) watching everything.
26	1 October 2011	The Brave Couple is still working on their picture. After finishing their painting, and being unsatisfied with it, they decide to call Won Joon's brother to get his opinion, to which he gratefully adds some helpful tips. They complete their family painting with the modifications. For the TeukSo couple, last week's meeting is continued with the other Super Junior members who came to the couple calling themselves 'Fighting Junior', a team with the mission of helping TeukSo to fight their awkwardness while giving them tasks (looking into each other's eyes while holding hands, giving each other pet names...) and at the end they decide to have a date.
27	8 October 2011	The Brave Couple is planning for their housewarming party. The two then start decorating their apartment. The couple continues to cook the food unknowingly that guests are on their way. As for the TeukSo couple, the two have a date in a beautiful restaurant and enjoy each other's company without Fighting Junior, and Leeteuk sings a song he wrote and plays the piano.
28	15 October 2011	It's the day of the Brave Couple's housewarming party. Guest included Ryu Si-won who is Won Joon's best friend, Shin Ji who was even the president of a Won Joon fan club, and Hong Rok Ki who is best friends with So Hyun and Won Joon's college senior. Presents are given, and So Hyun makes dinner. Later Won Joon shows a video of his and So Hyun's married life thus far. Shin Ji then pulls out her secret gift, a lie detector. Mischief then ensues.
29	22 October 2011	The Brave Couple is still continuing to play with the lie detector at their housewarming party. A few days after the party, So Hyun makes a baby-face breakfast for Won Joon since she saw Leeteuk and Kang So-ra's first episode on We Got Married and thought that they should try to take care of their skin and become younger. However, due to the spiciness of the breakfast, the MC's joked and said that it made Won Joon become older. So Hyun then has to grant Won Joon's wish since she was unable to eat some of the spicy pepper that she prepared. Won Joon then requests for her to dance ballet, which she agrees to and demonstrates to him her skill.
30	5 November 2011	
31	12 November 2011	
32	19 November 2011	
33	26 November 2011	
34	3 December 2011	
35	10 December 2011	
36	17 December 2011	
37	24 December 2011	
38	31 December 2011	
39	7 January 2012	
40	14 January 2012	
41	21 January 2012	
42	28 January 2012	
43	3 March 2012	
44	10 March 2012	
45	17 March 2012	
46	24 March 2012	
47	31 March 2012	
48	16 June 2012	
49	23 June 2012	
50	30 June 2012	
51	7 July 2012	
52	14 July 2012	
53	21 July 2012	
54	18 August 2012	
55	25 August 2012	
