= Daegu Hyehwa Girls' High School =

Coordinates: 35.8501892°N 128.6484898°E

- Korean: 혜화여자고등학교
- Daegu; South Korea

Information
- Established: November 21, 1983; 42 years ago
- Gender: Girls
- Enrollment: 1573 (2011)
- Website: hyehwa-h.sen.hs.kr

Hyehwa Girls' High School (Korean: 혜화여자고등학교) is an educational institution in Daegu, South Korea. The school was established on November 21, 1983, with the entrance ceremony commencing on March 7, 1984. As of 2011, there are 1,573 students enrolled. Building the school continued for the first 20 years, with completion of the auditorium taking place in 2004. Hyehwa sent many students to Seoul and kept the place as one of the prestigious schools in Daegu, Suseong-gu.

About 3.6% of students every year go to well-known universities. In 2013, a total of 18 students were accepted to medical schools or Seoul National University, and most of the students attended state universities and an education university (trains students to become professional elementary school teachers). In addition, more than 30 people attended the top 15 universities in Korea. Hyehwa is also known for its students who actively participate in extracurricular activities, such as school clubs. The most famous clubs are the science laboratory club called "Eureka," and the English club called "To the New Territory-T.N.T." These two school clubs are famous and preferred by many students, and students have to go through three steps of interviews and tests to be a member. Also, a team from the school has appeared on the TV show Quiz Champion. In 2006, a student at the school won first prize in the 1st English Essay Contest run by the Yeungnam Observer. The school has a symbol. The tree symbol of the school is a Ginkgo, and the flower symbol of the school is a Chrysanthemum.

== Notable alumni ==
- Park Ji-yeon
