= Park So-hyun =

South Korean actress (born 1971)

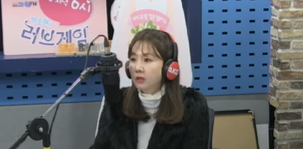
- Park in 2019
- Born: February 11, 1971 (age 55); South Korea
- Occupations: Actress; DJ
- Years active: 1993–present
- Agent: New Able

Korean name
- Hangul: 박소현
- RR: Bak Sohyeon
- MR: Pak Sohyŏn

Park So-hyun (Korean: 박소현; born February 11, 1971) is a South Korean actress. She has a syndicated talk radio show Love Game, aired via the SBS Power FM since 1999. She also participated in variety show We Got Married.

On September 20, 2016, Park and VIXX member Leo collaborated to celebrate SBS Power FM's 20th anniversary and released the song "That's All" (그뿐야) as part of SBS Power FM's anniversary song project.

== Filmography ==
=== Television series ===
Year	Title	Role	Network
1992	Tomorrow Is Love	Han Hye-bin	KBS2
1994	General Hospital		MBC
1996	Open Your Heart	Yoo Da-young	MBC
2001	Way of Living: Couple	Park Mi-ja	SBS
2003	Rose Fence	Kang Jae-kyung	KBS
2004	Lotus Flower Fairy/Heaven's Fate	Jang Shi-mong	MBC
2007	The Innocent Woman	Baek Il-hong	KBS
2009	Triple	Coach Shin (cameo)	MBC
2012	My Husband Got a Family	radio DJ (cameo)	KBS2
2013	Goddess of Marriage	cameo	SBS
2014	My Dear Cat	Han Eun-sook	KBS1
2015	The Missing	Kang Joo-young	OCN

=== Film ===
Year	Title	Role
1997	Repechage	
2003	A Man Who Went to Mars	Seon-mi
2010	Foxy Festival	Bunny (cameo)

=== Variety show ===
Year	Title	Network	Notes/Ref.
1996	Curiosity Heaven	SBS	
1998	Snapshot What on Earth	SBS	
2000	Connection Happy Time	KBS	
2002	Saturday Star Club		SBS
2003	Sympathize! The Special World	SBS	
2008	Park So-hyun's Secret Garden	Chanel Donga	
2009	New Sunday-Gold Miss Show	SBS	
2011	Table of God 2	tvN	
2011	Kim Wan Sun's Star	QTV	Narration
2011	We Got Married Season 3	MBC	married with Kim Won-jun
2012	Beauty Agent	FashionN	
2013	Running Man	SBS	Episode 149
2014	Top10	tvN	
2016	Battle Trip	KBS2	Episodes 23-24
2018	Battle Trip	KBS2	Episodes 94-95
2018	The Fan	SBS	Episode 1

=== Web shows ===
Year	Title	Role	Notes	Ref.
2022	Sisters Who Don't Taste Rice	Host	with Sandara Park	

== Awards and nominations ==
Name of the award ceremony, year presented, category, nominee of the award, and the result of the nomination
Award ceremony	Year	Category	Nominee / Work	Result	Ref.
Brand Customer Loyalty Awards	2022	Best Radio DJ	Park So-hyun	Won	
