= Dream High 2 =

2012 South Korean TV series

- Promotional poster
- Hangul: 드림하이 2
- RR: Deurimhai 2
- MR: Tŭrimhai 2
- Genre: Music; Teen; Comedy; Drama; Romance
- Written by: Heo Sung-hye (Ep. 1–6); Jang Eun-mi (Ep. 7–16)
- Directed by: Lee Eung-bok; Mo Wan-il
- Creative directors: Bae Yong-joon; J.Y. Park
- Starring: Kang So-ra; Jeong Jin-woon; Jay B; Park Ji-yeon; Hyolyn; Ailee; Park Seo-joon
- Country of origin: South Korea
- Original language: Korean
- No. of seasons: 2
- No. of episodes: 16

Production
- Executive producers: Moon Bo-hyun; Yang Gun-hwan; Jung Wook; Choi Kwan-yong
- Producers: Ahn Joon-yong; Yoon Gun-sik
- Running time: 60–69 minutes
- Production companies: Holym (Note: A JYP-KeyEast joint venture); CJ E&M Corp.

Original release
- Network: KBS2
- Release: January 30 – March 20, 2012

Related
- Dream High

Dream High 2 (Korean: 드림하이 2) is a 2012 South Korean television series starring Kang So-ra, Jay B, Jeong Jin-woon, Park Ji-yeon, Hyolyn, and Park Seo-joon. It aired on KBS2 from January 30 to March 20, 2012, every Monday and Tuesday at 22:00 (KST) for 16 episodes.

Original soundtracks from the show met with commercial and critical success and won the "Best Music" award at the first DramaFever Awards. "We Are The B" and "Superstar" also received nominations at the 7th Seoul International Drama Awards.

== Synopsis ==
Like its predecessor Dream High, it follows a group of students at the Kirin High School of Art stars who pursue their dream of becoming K-pop stars. However, it has a slight difference in terms of plot with its new set of student casts.

After going into financial bankruptcy, Kirin High School is taken over by Oz Entertainment. The company then transfers its own young trainees to circumvent a law requiring underage entertainers to study for a set amount of time. Competition brews between the troubled students at Kirin High, and the newly transferred Oz Entertainment trainees.

Although Shin Hae-sung (Kang So-ra) enters Kirin High School with a high exam score, she has no talent in singing. She meets and befriends fellow students, Jin Yoo-jin (Jung Jin-woon) and JB. Yoo-jin, who originally got into the entertainment industry as a child actor, is now troubled by his dreams of becoming a rock star as he tries to cope with the pain of his parents' divorce. JB, a member of a famous group I:dn (Eden), develops feelings for Hae-sung and dates her later on.

Ri-an (Jiyeon), a member of a famous girl group called HershE, chases after JB, who was once her boyfriend. Meanwhile, Yoo-jin, who also likes Hae-sung, tries to separate the couple with Ri-an. Later on, Ri-an and Yoo-jin give up and remain close friends.

Hae-sung leaves for the US, and 8 years after their graduation, it is revealed that she is now a famous composer and director. JB, due to his leg injury, gives up on his dream of being a dancer and ends up as a music producer. Ri-an becomes a Hallyu idol, and Yoo-jin becomes a rock music teacher at Kirin High School by day and a rocker by night.

All of them have a reunion performance on stage for Kirin High School's 17 years anniversary.

== Cast ==
=== Main ===
- Kang So-ra as Shin Hae-sung
- Jay B as JB / Jang Woo-jae
- Jeong Jin-woon as Jin Yoo-jin
- Park Ji-yeon as Ri-an / Lee Ji-kyung
- Hyolyn as Na-na / Kim Jae-hee
- Park Seo-joon as Lee Si-woo

=== Supporting ===
==== Students in Kirin High School ====
- Park Jin-young as Jung Ui-bong
- Yoo So-young as Park Soon-dong
- Kim Ji-soo as Park Hong-joo
- Jung Yeon-joo as Lee Seul
- Ailee as Ailee

==== Teachers in Kirin High School ====
- Park Jin-young as Yang Jin-man (English teacher)
- Kwon Hae-hyo as Joo Jung-wan (principal)
- Kim Jung-tae as Lee Kang-chul (president)
- Choi Yeo-jin as Ahn Tae-yeon (vocal teacher)
- Kahi as Hyun Ji-soo (dance teacher)

==== Others ====
- Yoon Hee-seok as Shin Jae-in
- Hwang Mi-sun as Ri-an's mother
- Jung Kyu-soo as Hae-sung's father
- Roh Jeong-eui as Shin Hae-pung (Hae-sung's sister)
  - Jo Jung-eun as teen Shin Hae-pung (Ep. 16)

=== Special appearances ===
- Kim Soo-hyun as actor playing Song Sam-dong (Ep. 1)
- Lee Ji-eun as Kim Pil-sook (Ep. 1)
- Mark Tuan as I:dn backup dancer (Ep. 1)
- Young K as I:dn backup dancer (Ep. 1)
- Lee Chung-mi as Ga-yeong
- Park Sung-jun as I:dn backup dancer (Ep. 1)
- Toxic as band performing with Yoo-jin in Hongdae (Ep. 1 & 2)
- Nayeon as Jung Ui-bong's dance partner (Ep. 2)
- Myname as OZ Entertainment idol group (Ep. 2)
- Boyfriend as themselves (Ep. 2)
- Psy as trainer coach (Ep. 5 & 6)
- Kim Seon-nyeo as Jin Yoo-jin's mother (Ep. 8, 12–16)
- Park Ye-eun as herself (Ep. 9)
- miss A as themselves (Ep. 15)
- Park Jin-young as himself (Ep. 16)

== Original soundtrack ==
Dream High 2: Original Sound Track

Soundtrack album by Various Artists
- Released: January 31, 2012
- Recorded: 2011–12
- Genres: Pop, K-pop, soundtrack, R&B, teen pop
- Labels: Holym, LOEN Entertainment
- Producer: J.Y. Park "The Asiansoul"

Part 1:
No.	Title	Artist	Length
1.	"Falling"	Park Jin-young	3:21

Part 2:
No.	Title	Artist	Length
1.	"You Are My Star"	Suzy	3:31

Part 3:
No.	Title	Artist	Length
1.	"Hello to Myself"	Park Ye Eun	3:36

Part 4:
No.	Title	Artist	Length
1.	"Superstar"	Hyolyn, Ailee & Jiyeon (HershE)	3:42

Part 5:
No.	Title	Artist	Length
1.	"아픈 희망" (Sick of Hope)	Lee Ki Chan	3:49

Part 6:
No.	Title	Artist	Length
1.	"B급 인생" (We Are the B)	Jinwoon, Kang So-ra, Jr., Kim JiSoo	2:31

Part 7:
No.	Title	Artist	Length
1.	"Together"	JB & Jiyeon	4:19

Part 8:
No.	Title	Artist	Length
1.	"하루하루" (Day After Day)	Jiyeon	3:43

Part 9:
No.	Title	Artist	Length
1.	"Sunflower"	Kim JiSoo	4:41

Part 10:
No.	Title	Artist	Length
1.	"New Dreaming"	JB and Park Seo-joon (I:dn)	3:07

=== Background ===
"Falling" is the first part of the drama's soundtrack and was featured in the first episode of the drama. Park Jin-young was once again involved in composing, writing and interpreting the soundtrack of the drama.

The track "Falling" is a slow tempo with beautiful guitar melody. It has gained a lot of popular responses, sweeping music charts since its release, and ranking first, second and third on real time charts. The song is available on digital music portals such as Melon, Soribada, Bugs and Mnet. The rest of the soundtrack will include more beautiful melodies reflecting character stories, struggles and dreams in the drama.

=== Songs performed ===
Songs performed
- HerShe: Superstar (ep. 1)
- Eden: New Dreaming (ep. 1)
- Hong-joo: Tell Me Your Wish – Girls' Generation (ep. 1)
- Yoo-jin: You Walking Towards Me – Jinwoon (ep. 1)
- All cast: Roly Poly – T-ara (ep. 2)
- Hong-joo, Ui-bong: I Am the Best – 2NE1 (ep. 2)
- Nana, Ailee: Top Girl – G.NA (ep. 2)
- All cast: Entertainer – Psy (ep. 2)
- TOXIC: New Dreaming (ep. 2)
- Nana, Hong-joo: Destiny – Jeon Byung-uk (ep. 3)
- Yoo-jin: You Walking Towards Me – Jinwoon (ep. 3)
- Tae-yeon: That Woman – Baek Ji-young (ep. 4)
- Jin-man: Mm Mm Mm – Park Jin-young (ep. 4)
- Hae-sung: Wishing on a Star – Wonder Girls (ep. 4)
- Nana, Hong-joo: Covered Up Road – Yoo Jae-ha (ep. 4)
- Ailee: Please (ep. 5)
- Rian: Wishing on a Star – Wonder Girls (ep. 5)
- Nana, Hong-joo: Covered Up Road – Yoo Jae-ha (ep. 5)
- Yoo-jin, JB: Beautiful Dance – Bye Bye Sea (ep. 5)
- Yoo-jin: Starlight Is Falling – Bye Bye Sea (ep. 5)
- Yoo-jin, Rian, Hong-joo and the band: Superstar – Lee Han-chul (ep. 6)
- Hong-joo: Na This Time (ep. 6)
- Hae-sung: Hello to Myself – Yeeun (ep. 6)
- Rian, Yoo-jin: Hello to Myself – Yeeun (ep. 7)
- JB: When I Can't Sing – Seven (ep. 8)
- Nana, Ji-soo: I'm in Love – Narsha (ep. 8)
- Yeeun: Hello to Myself – Yeeun (ep. 9)
- Hong-joo, Seul: We Are the B (ep. 9)
- Yoo-jin, Hae-sung, Ui-bong, Soon-dong, Hong-joo, Seul – We Are the B (ep. 9)
- Ailee: On Rainy Days – BEAST (ep. 10)
- JB, Si-woo: In the Rain – John Park (ep. 10)
- JB, Si-woo, Ailee, Nana: Love Rain – Kim Tae-woo (ep. 10)
- Hong-joo: This Song – 2AM (ep. 10)
- JB, Si-woo, Ailee, Rian: One Candle – g.o.d (ep. 10)
- JB, Si-woo, Ailee, Rian: One Candle – g.o.d (ep. 11)
- JB: Marshmallow – IU (ep. 11)
- Nana, Hong-joo: My Heart Will Go On – Celine Dion (ep. 12)
- Ui-bong, Ailee: Summer Nights – Grease (ep. 12)
- JB, Hae-sung: Bobbed Hair – Cho Young Pil (ep. 12)
- Yoo-jin, Rian: Romeo & Juliet – Clazziquai (ep. 12)
- Nana: Isn't She Lovely – Stevie Wonder (ep. 13)
- Ui-bong: I Have a Girl – Park Jin-young (ep. 13)
- Seul: How Dare You – Sistar (ep. 13)
- Ui-bong: Dirty Cash – Big Bang (ep. 13)
- Nana, Hong-joo: Good Day – Jo Sungmo (ep. 14)
- Seul: Dirty Cash – BigBang (ep. 14)
- Ui-bong, Seul: Balloons – TVXQ (ep. 14)
- JB, Rian: Together (ep. 14)
- Hong-joo: Sunflower (ep. 15)
- Yoo-jin: Sorry – Jinwoon (ep. 15)
- JB: We Are the B (ep. 15)
- Rian: Day After Day (ep. 16)
- JB, Yoo-jin, Rian, Nana, Si-woo, Ailee, Ui-bong, Hong-joo: Dream High – Dream High (ep. 16)

== Ratings ==
In this table, the blue numbers represent the lowest ratings and the red numbers represent the highest ratings.

Ep.	Original broadcast date	Average audience share			
Ep.	Original broadcast date	AGB Nielsen		TNmS	
Ep.	Original broadcast date	Nationwide	Seoul	Nationwide	Seoul
1	January 30, 2012	10.5%	11.6%	9.2%	9.8%
2	January 31, 2012	9.8%	11.7%	8.9%	10.2%
3	February 6, 2012	7.2%	8.6%	8.2%	9.8%
4	February 7, 2012	8.2%	9.9%	9.8%	11.7%
5	February 13, 2012	7.7%	9.1%	7.6%	8.9%
6	February 14, 2012	7.9%	9.5%	7.9%	9.0%
7	February 20, 2012	8.1%	9.7%	6.9%	9.9%
8	February 21, 2012	7.9%	9.2%	7.8%	8.3%
9	February 27, 2012	7.3%	8.9%	7.7%	8.7%
10	February 28, 2012	7.9%	9.1%	7.8%	9.7%
11	March 5, 2012	6.4%	7.1%	6.3%	7.1%
12	March 6, 2012	6.4%	7.6%	7.1%	8.5%
13	March 12, 2012	6.2%	7.8%	5.2%	6.5%
14	March 13, 2012	7.8%	7.5%	9.7%	8.5%
15	March 19, 2012	5.7%	6.8%	5.7%	6.8%
16	March 20, 2012	7.6%	8.5%	9.4%	9.7%
Average		7.7%	8.9%	7.8%	8.9%

== Awards and nominations ==
Year	Award	Category	Recipient	Result	Ref
2012	The 48th Baeksang Arts Awards	Male Popularity Award - TV	Jeong Jinwoon	Nominated	
2012	The 48th Baeksang Arts Awards	Best New Actress Award	Kang So-ra	Nominated	
2012	The 48th Baeksang Arts Awards	Female Popularity Award - TV	Jiyeon	Nominated	
2012	The 48th Baeksang Arts Awards	Female Popularity Award - TV	Kang So-ra	Nominated	
2012	The 48th Baeksang Arts Awards	Female Popularity Award - TV	Hyolyn	Nominated	
2012	5th Korea Drama Awards	Best New Actress	Hyolyn	Nominated	
2012	Seoul International Drama Awards	Outstanding Drama Award	Dream High 2	Nominated	
2012	Seoul International Drama Awards	Best OST (Daum Music Award)	"Superstar" (Jiyeon, Hyolyn and Ailee)	Nominated	
2012	Seoul International Drama Awards	Best OST (Daum Music Award)	"We Are The B" (Kang So-ra, Jinwoon, Jr., Kim JiSoo)	Nominated	
2013	DramaFever Awards	Best Music	Dream High 2	Won	
2013	DramaFever Awards	Best Ensemble Cast	Jiyeon, Hyolyn, Ailee, Kang So-ra, Jinwoon, Jay B	Nominated	

== Listicles ==
Publisher	Year	List	Rank	Ref.
Google Korea	2012	Most searched terms in 2012	4th	
Buzzfeed	2021	24 K-Dramas That Are Made Even Better By Their Fantastic Soundtracks	8th	
