= Death Bell 2: Bloody Camp =

- Film poster
- Hangul: 고사 두번째 이야기: 교생실습
- Hanja: 고死 두番째 이야기: 敎生實習
- RR: Gosa dubeonjjae iyagi: gyosaengsilseup
- MR: Kosa tubŏntchae iyagi: kyosaengsilsŭp
- Directed by: Yoo Sun-dong
- Written by: Park Hye-min; Lee Jeong-hwa; Lee Gong-ju
- Produced by: Kim Gwang-su
- Starring: Yoon Shi-yoon; Park Ji-yeon; Hwang Jung-eum; Kim Soo-ro; Park Eun-bin; Yoon Seung-ah; Son Ho-jun
- Cinematography: Choi Yeong-taek
- Edited by: Choi Min-yeong; Lee Jin
- Music by: Kim Woo-geun
- Production company: Core Contents Media
- Distributed by: Next Entertainment World
- Release date: July 28, 2010
- Running time: 84 minutes
- Country: South Korea
- Language: Korean
- Budget: ₩1.1 billion
- Box office: US$5,191,289

Death Bell 2: Bloody Camp (Korean: 고死 두번째 이야기: 교생실습) is a 2010 South Korean slasher film. It was directed by Yoo Sun-dong and is a sequel to the 2008 film Death Bell. The story is unrelated to the previous film. The film was also pre-sold in Taiwan and Hong Kong for $230,000 at the 63rd Cannes International Film Festival Film Market.

== Plot ==
A group of high school students and teachers are locked in the school after the swimming instructor is murdered. In South Korea, the high school student and swimmer Jeong Tae-yeon (Yoon Seung-ah) is found dead in the pool, apparently a suicide. Two years later, teacher Park Eun-su (Hwang Jung-eum) joins the high school, where Tae-yeon's stepsister Lee Se-Hee (Park Ji-yeon) is haunted by nightmarish visions and is bullied by student Eom Ji-yun (Choi Ah-jin). Eun-su finds it difficult to earn respect in the classroom and is backed up by an older teacher, Mr. Cha (Kim Soo-ro). Se-Hee and her classmates are selected for an elite "study camp" held at the school during the summer break, where 30 students study for their university entrance exams. The school's swim coach is murdered in the showers and the words "When an innocent mother is killed, what son would not avenge her death?" are found scrawled on a blackboard. A voice warns the students that they will all be killed unless they can answer who is the murderer and why. The students and teachers find they are locked in the school when more deaths begin to happen.

After the death of several students, Mr. Cha is trapped in an activated dryer with the temperature increasing rapidly. The students try to save him by inputting the correct password phrase for the dryer with hints from various photographs, but are too late and Mr. Cha is incinerated. After failing to rescue their teacher, a student notices Ji-yun has disappeared. It is revealed that Ji-yun escaped the site and had confessed her sins to Eun-su.

In the past, Ji-yun and the students who were killed were part of a study group. After a study session, the group decided to drink in the school, and Soo-il was pushed by the group to have sex with Tae-yeon. The ensuing struggle ended with Ji-yun smashing her head into a water tap, killing her. Her boyfriend Jung-bum realized this, but with the help of Mr. Cha and the swim coach's testimonies, the students falsely accuse Jung-bum of the murder, leading him to be put in a mental facility, and inadvertently causing the death of his mother. Later, he and Eun-su, revealed to be his sister, begin to plan their revenge on the culprits.

Then, Eun-su announces that for 10 minutes from now, the students will be able to make a call from a phone that is locked in a safe, in the auditorium. Shortly after, she is found by some male students and beaten to death. In the auditorium, the final trap is found. Ji-yun is secured to a noose, with the key for the safe on the other end. In order to unlock the safe, they must pull the noose far enough which will lock Ji-yun at the top and hang her. The fight ends with the students able to unlock the safe and make a phone call, however the time runs out and the call disconnects before it is picked up, as Ji-yun hangs from the noose to her death.

Later, Jung-bum sets the school on fire. Kwan-woo devises a plan to escape by using butane cylinders to explode the gate. As the other students escape, Kwan-woo and Na-rae realise Se-hee is missing and go back for her. At the pool, Se-hee contemplates her past with Tae-yeon. Se-hee was actually a member of Ji-yun's study group who was taken advantage of due to her unpopularity, and was also present at the night of Tae-yeon's death. Upon learning the group's plans to assault Tae-yeon, she begs them to stop but is posed an ultimatum by Ji-yun: to either stay and stop them or leave them be, with her choice being to leave out of fear of losing her place in the study group, becoming a bystander to Tae-yeon's murder.

Jung-bum arrives at the pool as well. He chains himself and Se-hee together, and jumps in the pool to drown both of them. Kwan-woo and Na-rae try to break the chain to no avail, leaving Se-hee to be drowned. However, the ghost of Tae-yeon appears and releases her from the chain, as Tae-yeon and Jung-bum slowly disappear through the darkness in the swimming pool. During the credits, Se-hee is revived through CPR by Kwan-woo.

== Cast ==
- Yoon Shi-yoon as Kwan-woo
- Park Ji-yeon as Lee Se-Hee
- Kim Soo-ro as teacher Cha
- Hwang Jung-eum as newcomer teacher Park Eun-su
- Choi Ah-jin as Eom Ji-yun
- Kim Min-young as Min-jung
- Kwon Hyun-sang as JK
- Ji Chang-wook as Soo-il
- Nam Bo-ra as Hyun-ah
- Son Ho-jun as Jung-bum
- Yoon Seung-ah as Jeong Tae-yeon
- Park Eun-bin as Na-rae

== Release ==
Death Bell 2: Bloody Camp was premiered at the Puchon International Fantastic Film Festival on July 23, 2010, where it was the festival's closing film. The film received wide release in South Korea on July 28, 2010.

While writing the script, it was suggested that the characters should solve their problems in a quiz show format like they did in the first film. Director Yoo Sun-dong was against this ideas as he felt it was too much of an imitation of the first film. Yoo was influenced by his own high school experiences, stating that "Authoritative teachers like Teacher Kang (played by Kim Byung-ok) and Teacher Cha (played by Kim Su-ro) or the competition and violence between the students were things that I saw and felt when I was in school. I tried to put such horrifying elements into the film."

== Reception ==
=== Commercial success ===
On wide-release, the film was a huge success with over 97,000 people seeing it in Korea on its opening day and around 300,000 people in its first 3 days. An official for the film said it was "four times what we expected".

The film was also pre-sold in Taiwan and Hong Kong for $230,000 at the 63rd Cannes International Film Festival Film Market.

=== Critical response ===
The film received mixed reviews.The Hollywood Reporter wrote that the film was an "alarmingly brainless and sloppily directed follow-up to Death Bell" noting that the only "scene worthy of attention is when student Jang-kook is stranded on a corridor and repeatedly attacked by a motorbike outfitted with revolving blades. It has the Gothic, apocalyptic taste of Mad Max." JoongAng Daily gave a negative review of the film, saying that "it should have taken more chances and offered audiences more than blood...the film won't do much for viewers who are die-hard slasher film fans". Despite negative reviews, both The Hollywood Reporter and JoongAng Daily praised the scene involving a metal-spiked motorcycle that attacks a student. Film Business Asia gave the film a seven out of ten rating saying that the film was a "dark, fast-moving gore feast, with less emphasis on puzzle countdowns but a richer plot than its predecessor".

Asian Economy credited Park Jiyeon, Eun-bin, Ji Chang-wook and Yoon Seung-ah as one of the factors for the movie's success praising their acting performance.

== Accolades ==
=== Awards & Nominations ===
Year	Award	Category	recipient	Result	Ref
2010	47th Baeksang Arts Awards	Popularity Award - Movie	Jiyeon	Nominated	
