= Lila Art High School =

Public high school in Seoul, South Korea

Lila Art High School 리라아트고등학교

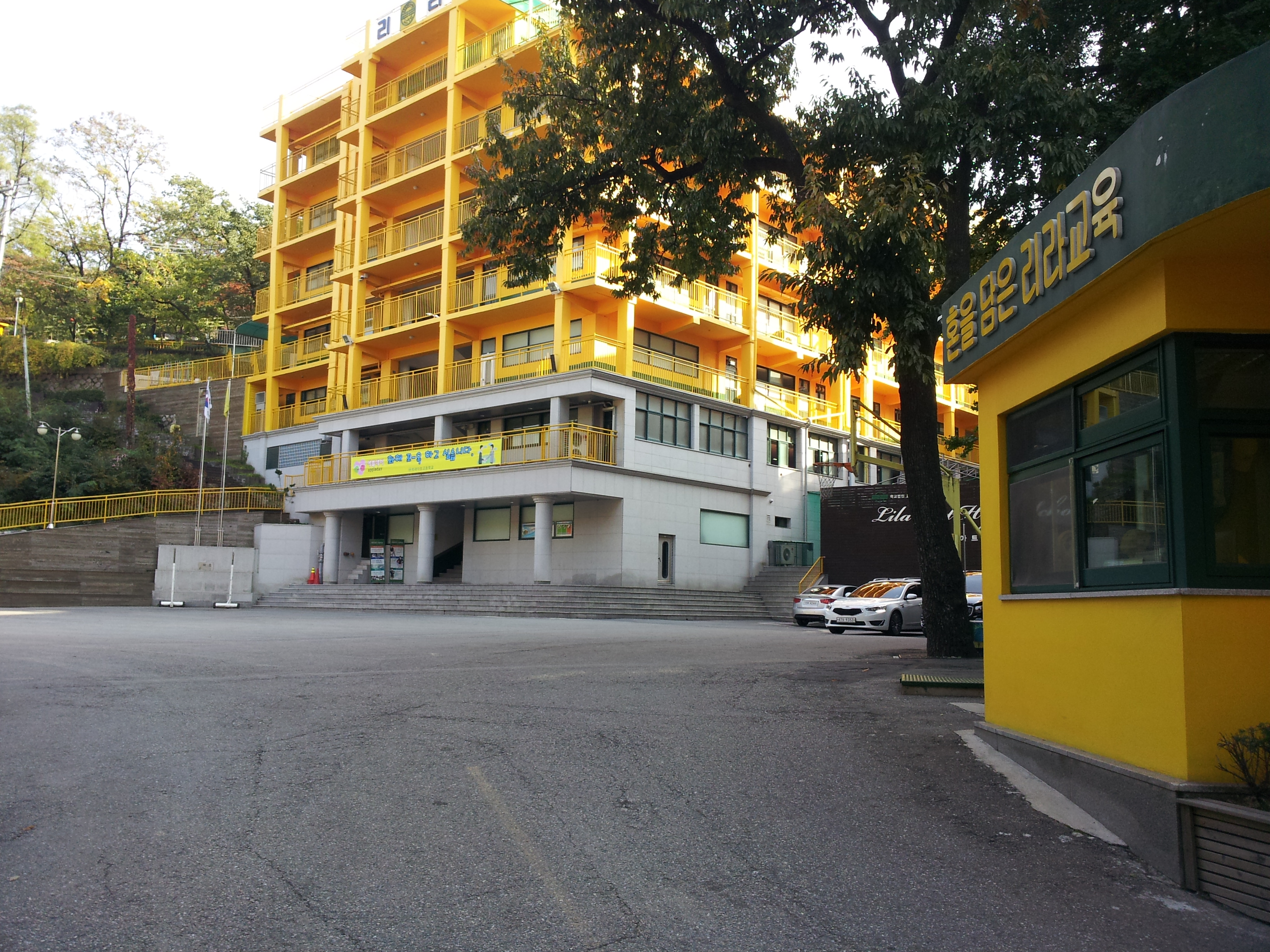
- Lila Art High School in 2014

Location
- 24 Sopa-ro 2-gil, Yejang-dong, Jung-gu, Seoul
- 37.557116°N 126.988252°E

Information
- Type: Public
- Motto: Production, Independence, Service.
- Founded: 1952
- Colors: Yellow and Green
- Website: lila.hs.kr

Lila Art High School (previously known as Lila Computer High School; Korean: 리라아트고등학교) is a high school in South Korea. Originally founded in 1952 by Kwon Eungpal as a vocational boys' school, it changed its name to "Lila Industrial High School" in 1992, "Lila Computer High School" in 2000, and finally "Lila Art High School" in 2009.

The school seeks to maximize the students' individuality and creativity and nurture the foundation of lifelong happiness. This is broken up into three pillars: diligence, love and creation.

This private school is located in Jung-gu, Seoul and house 385 students (163 male, 222 female) and 48 faculty (26 male, 22 female).

== Departments ==
- Department of Computer Media
- Digital Sound Content Division
- Department of Health Science
- Department of Visual and Music Contents
- Theater & Acting (Applied Music)
- Sports Management

== Notable alumni ==
- Bae Jin-young
- Jin Jun-tak
- Kang Ye-seo
- Kwak Jung-wook
- Moon Dae-sung
- Park Ji-yeon
- Park Sun-young (aka "Luna")
- Woo Hye-rim
