= Kang So-ra =

South Korean actress (born 1990)

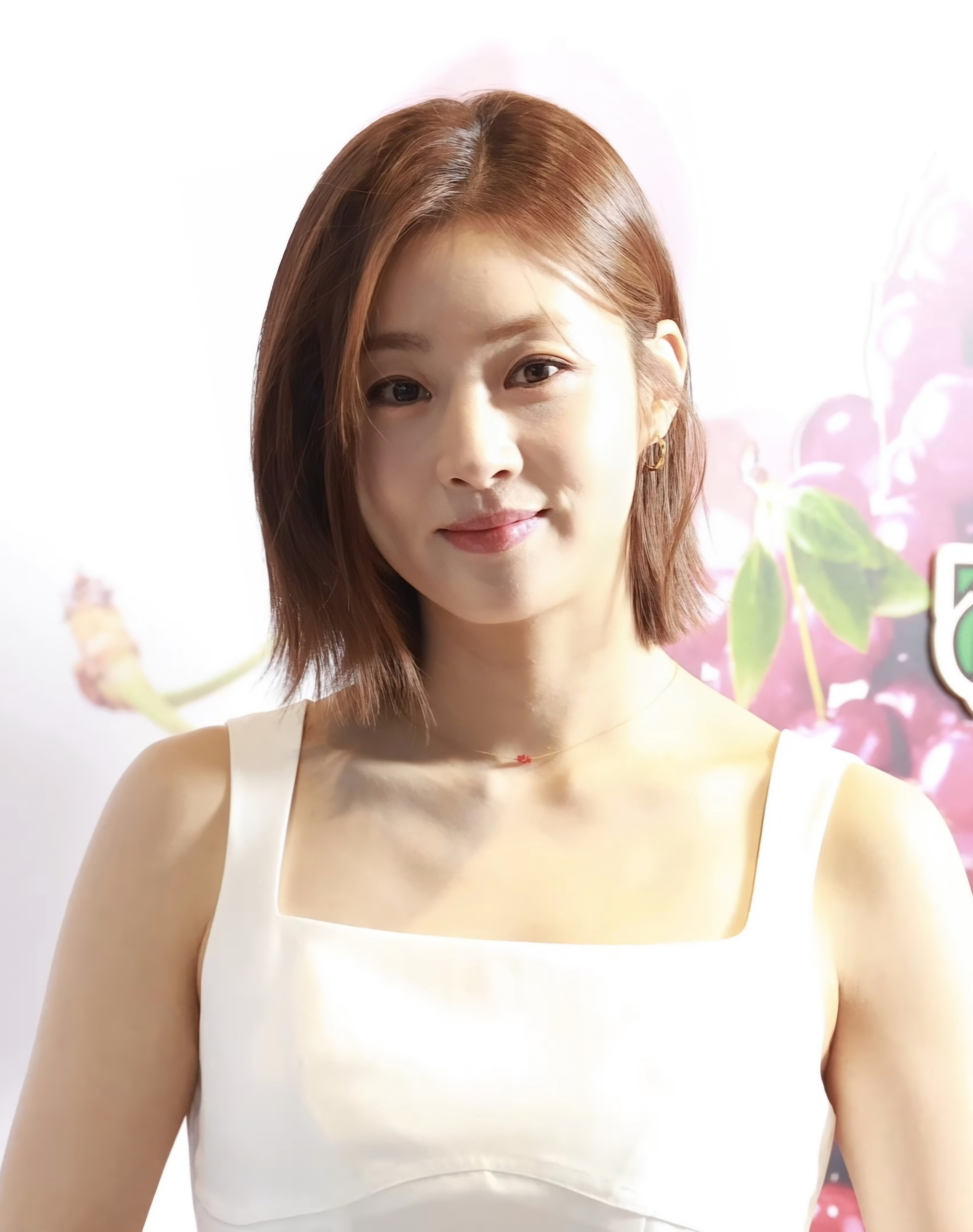
- Kang in July 2024
- Born: February 18, 1990 (age 36); Gangdong District, Seoul, South Korea
- Education: Dongguk University - Theater and Film
- Occupation: Actress
- Years active: 2009–present
- Agent: Studio Uhoo
- Spouse: Unknown (m. 2020)
- Children: 2

Korean name
- Hangul: 강소라
- RR: Gang Sora
- MR: Kang Sora

Signature
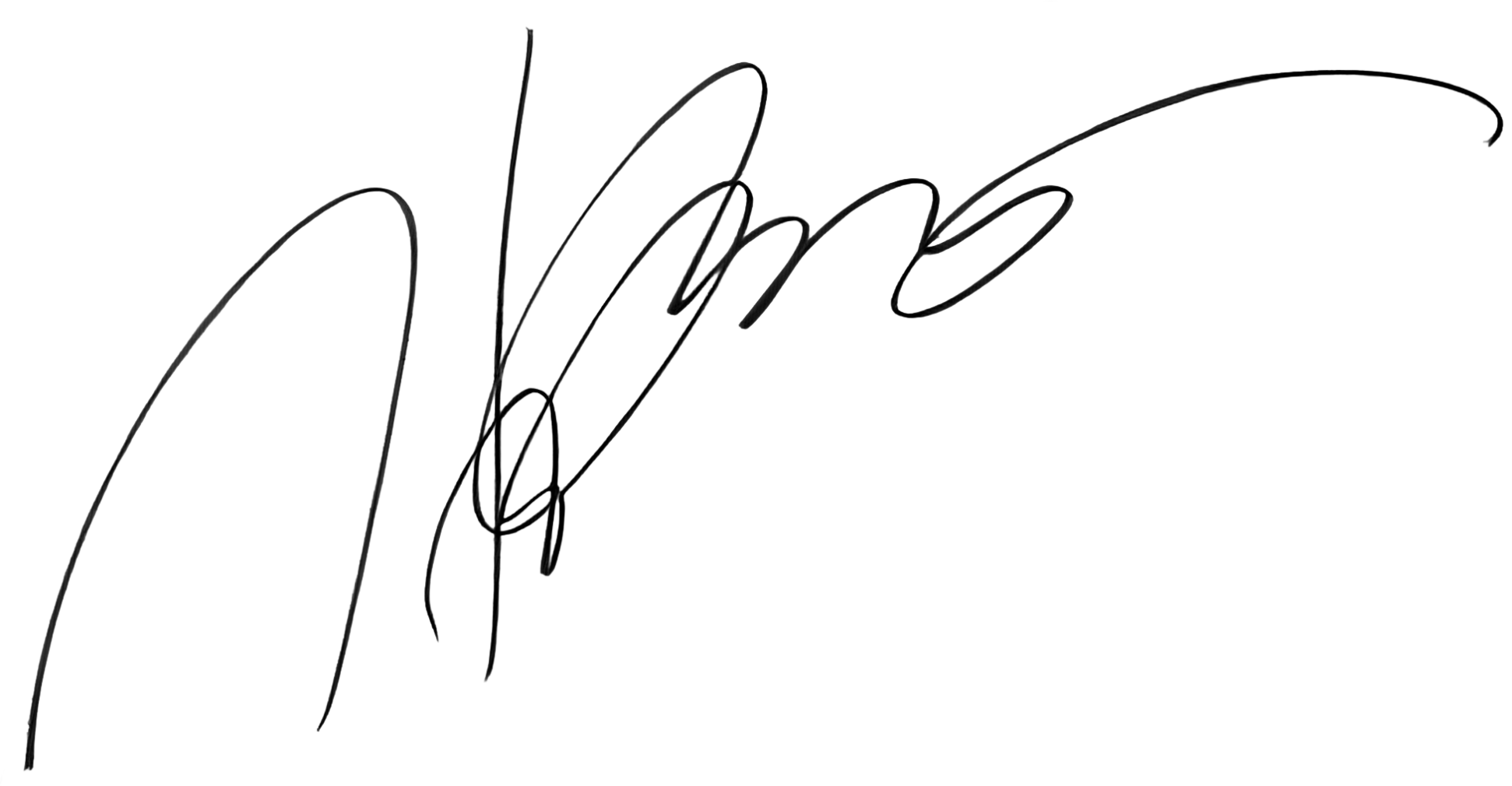

Kang So-ra (Korean: 강소라; born February 18, 1990) is a South Korean actress.

== Career ==
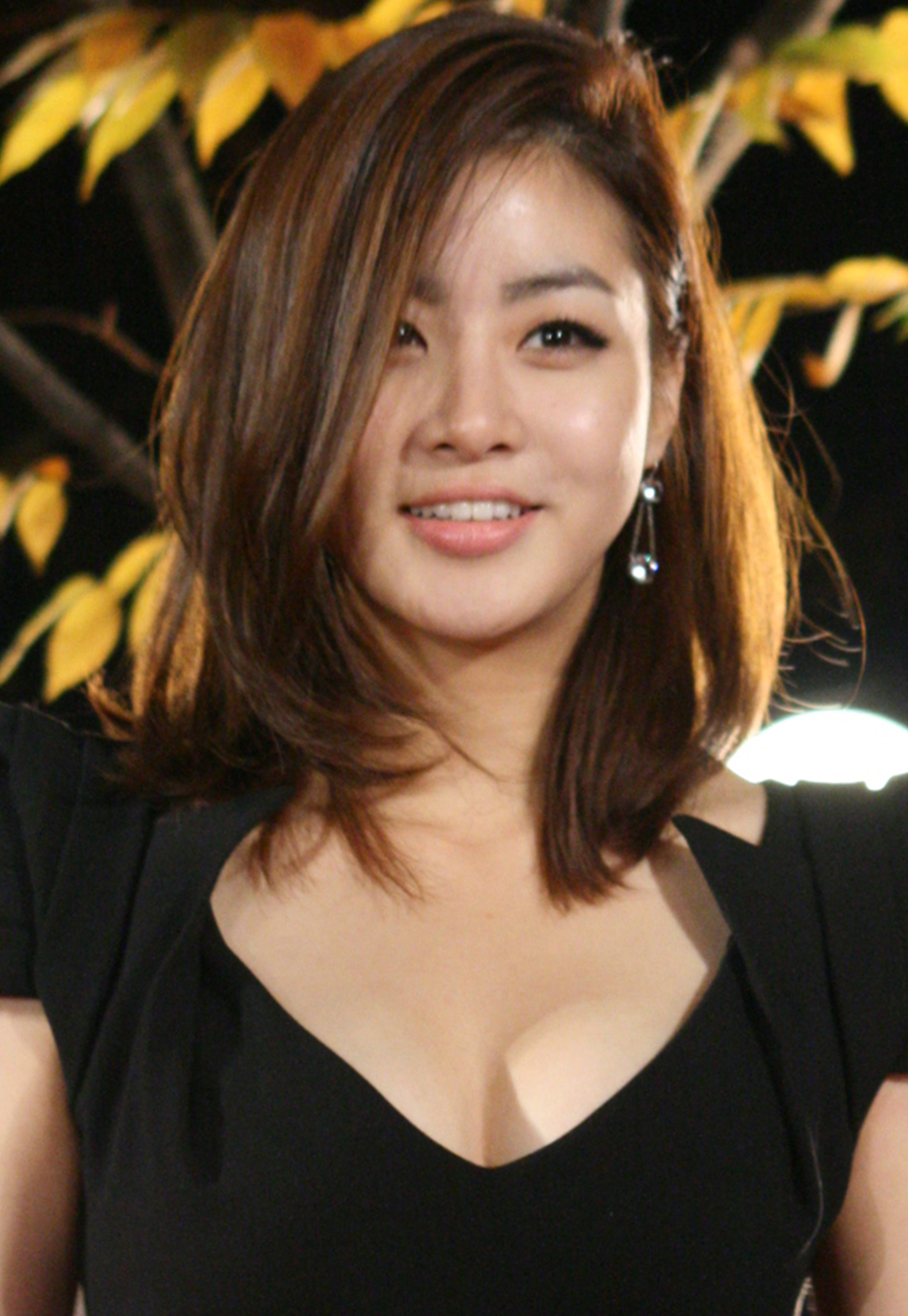
Kang in 2011

Kang made her acting debut in the 2009 thriller movie 4th Period Mystery, but rose to fame when she starred in the 2011 blockbuster Sunny, a coming-of-age film about a group of high school girls growing up in the 1980s. This was followed by leading roles in television dramas, such as teen musical Dream High 2 (2012), and family drama Ugly Alert (2013). Kang also appeared on the third season of We Got Married, a reality show which pairs up celebrities into fake "married" couples; her partner was Leeteuk from the K-pop group Super Junior.

Kang gained increased recognition after starring in two hit series in 2014: medical drama Doctor Stranger (2014) and workplace dramedy Misaeng: Incomplete Life (2014). Doctor Stranger was a success in China with 400 million views, and Misaeng: Incomplete Life was dubbed a "cultural phenomenon" in South Korea. This was followed by lead roles in romantic comedy Warm and Cozy (2015) together with Yoo Yeon-seok, legal drama My Lawyer, Mr. Jo (2016), and romantic comedy Revolutionary Love (2017) alongside Choi Si-won from the k-pop group Super Junior.

In 2019, Kang returned to the big screen in the cycling film Uhm Bok-dong.

In 2020, Kang starred in the comedy film Secret Zoo, based on the webtoon of the same name. She plays a veterinarian who pretends to be a lion. The same year, she was cast in the romance melodrama film Waiting for Rain.

== Other ventures ==
=== Ambassadorship ===
Year	Title	Campaign Organizer	Ref.
2015–present	Alcon Brand Ambassador	Alcon	
2016	Dongguk Ambassador	Dongguk University	

=== Endorsements ===
In 2009, Kang appeared in advertisements for the music streaming service MelOn and in Samsung Anycall mobile phone commercials. In 2010, she was featured in commercials for Orion's Market O snacks. In 2011, Kang appeared in seasonal apparel campaigns, including advertisements for Buckaroo. In 2015, Kang was chosen as the advertising model for Kellogg's Special K cereal. She was also selected as the model for Canon Korea's EOS M3 mirrorless camera. That same year, she appeared in advertisements for the cosmetics brand A.H.C. and was selected as the advertising model for Coca-Cola's Sprite alongside rapper Bobby.

In 2016, Kang was appointed as the advertising model by Thinkware for iNavi navigation and black-box products. She was also selected as the model for the beauty device brand Tria. In 2017, she was chosen as the advertising model for the fiber drink Miero Fiber. In 2018, Kang became the promotional model for Samchuly Bicycle. She was also appointed as a brand muse for beauty device maker CellReturn, continuing in that role through 2020. In 2019, she was selected as a model for the golf apparel brand Phantom. In 2024, Kang appeared in a digital advertisement for GLFIT Diet, a health brand by Jongkundang Health.

== Personal life ==
It was revealed on a May 2026 episode of Running Man that Kang is multilingual, as she can speak Korean, English and Japanese, while also learning little bit of Russian language for one of her role's scenes in TV Drama Misaeng: Incomplete Life.

=== Marriage and family ===
Kang married a doctor of Oriental medicine in August 2020 in a private ceremony. On November 19, 2020, it was announced that Kang was pregnant with their first child, due in April 2021.

On April 15, 2021, Kang's agency announced that Kang had given birth to a daughter. On October 16, 2023, it was confirmed that she is expecting her second child and expected to give birth at the end of this year. Kang gave birth to her second daughter on December 11, 2023.

== Filmography ==
=== Film ===
Year	Title	Role	Notes	Ref.
2009	4th Period Mystery	Lee Da-jeong		
2009	Kwang-tae's Basic Story	Ji-hyo	short film	
2011	Sunny	teenage Ha Chun-hwa		
2012	Brave	Mérida	(voice, Korean dubbing)	
2013	My Paparotti	Sook-hee		
2013	Cheer Up, Mr. Lee	Herself	cameo	
2019	Uhm Bok-dong	Kim Hyung-shin		
2020	Secret Zoo	So Won		
2021	Waiting for Rain	Soo-jin		
2027	K-Pop: The Debut	TBA		

=== Television series ===
Year	Title	Role	Notes	Ref.
2010	Ugly Miss Young-ae 7	Kang So-ra		
2010	Dr. Champ	Kwon Yoo-ri		
2010	Ugly Miss Young-ae 8	Kang So-ra		
2011	My Bittersweet Life	Hong Yoon-mi		
2012	Dream High 2	Shin Hae-sung		
2013	Ugly Alert	Na Do-hee		
2013	Ugly Miss Young-ae 12	Kang So-ra	cameo	
2014	Doctor Stranger	Oh Soo-hyun		
2014	Misaeng: Incomplete Life	Ahn Young-yi		
2015	Warm and Cozy	Lee Jung-joo		
2016	My Lawyer, Mr. Jo	Lee Eun-jo		
2017	Revolutionary Love	Baek Joon		
2018	The Beauty Inside	Host	Cameo	
2023	Strangers Again	Oh Ha-ra		

=== Television shows ===
Year	Title	Role	Notes	Ref.
2011–2012	We Got Married Season 3	Cast member	Paired with Leeteuk	
2013	My Soul's Table	Cast member		

=== Hosting ===
Year	Title	Ref.
2011	MBC Music Festival	
2012	MBC Entertainment Awards	
2017	31st Golden Disc Awards	
2018	32nd Golden Disc Awards	
2019	33rd Golden Disc Awards	

=== Music video appearances ===
Year	Song title	Artist	Notes	Ref.
2009	"This Good Day"	Halla Man		
2009	"Gloria"	PK Heman	Kang is also featured on the album cover	
2009	"Merely"	JK Kim Dong-wook		
2009	"Happy Me"	Hong Kyung-min		
2011	"Hello"	Huh Gak		
2011	"I Told You I Wanna Die"	Huh Gak	includes narration by Kang	
2017	"Curtain"	Suho ft. Song Young-joo		

== Discography ==
=== Soundtrack appearances ===
Title	Year	Album
"Round and Round" (빙글빙글) (with Nam Bo-ra, Kim Bo-mi, Park Jin-joo, Kang So-ra, Min Hyo-rin, Kim Min-yeong)	2011	Sunny OST
"B Class Life" (B 급인생) (with Jeong Jinwoon, Kang So-ra, Jinyoung, Kim Ji-soo)	2012	Dream High 2 OST

== Accolades ==
=== Awards and nominations ===
Name of the award ceremony, year presented, category, nominee of the award, and the result of the nomination
Award ceremony	Year	Category	Nominee / Work	Result	Ref.
APAN Star Awards	2014	Excellence Award, Actress in a Miniseries	Doctor Stranger	Nominated	
APAN Star Awards	2015	Excellence Award, Actress in a Miniseries	Misaeng: Incomplete Life & Warm and Cozy	Nominated	
Asia Model Awards	2014	Popular Star Award	Kang So-ra	Won	
Baeksang Arts Awards	2012	Best New Actress – Film	Sunny	Nominated	
Baeksang Arts Awards	2012	Most Popular Actress – Film	Sunny	Won	
Baeksang Arts Awards	2012	Best New Actress – Television	Dream High 2	Nominated	
Blue Dragon Film Awards	2011	Best New Actress	Sunny	Nominated	
Buil Film Awards	2012	Best New Actress	Sunny	Won	
Grand Bell Awards	2011	Best New Actress	Sunny	Nominated	
Herald Donga Lifestyle Awards	2014	Best Style of the Year	Kang So-ra	Won	
KBS Drama Awards	2016	Excellence Award, Actress in a Mid-length Drama	My Lawyer, Mr. Jo	Nominated	
Korea Advertisers Association Awards	2015	Best Model Award	Kang So-ra	Won	
Korea Drama Awards	2014	Excellence Award, Actress	Doctor Stranger	Won	
MBC Drama Awards	2015	Excellence Award, Actress in a Miniseries	Warm and Cozy	Won	
MBC Entertainment Awards	2012	Popularity Award (Variety Show)	We Got Married (Season 3)	Won	
Miss Supertalent Season 4	2014	Asia New Star	Kang So-ra	Won	
Mnet 20's Choice Awards	2011	Hot Movie Star	Sunny	Won	
SBS Drama Awards	2013	Excellence Award, Actress in a Weekend/Daily Drama	Ugly Alert	Nominated	
SBS Drama Awards	2013	New Star Award	Ugly Alert	Won	
SBS Drama Awards	2014	Excellence Award, Actress in a Drama Special	Doctor Stranger	Nominated	

=== Listicles ===
Name of publisher, year listed, name of listicle, and placement
Publisher	Year	Listicle	Placement	Ref.
Forbes	2018	Korea Power Celebrity	37th	
