= 2BiC =

South Korean R&B duo

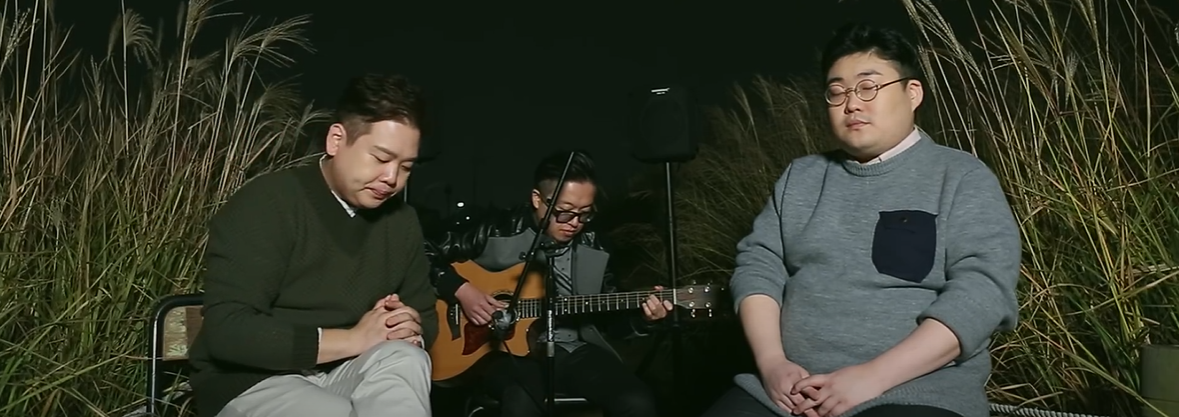

Background information
- Origin: Seoul, South Korea
- Genres: R&B
- Years active: 2012–present
- Labels: Nextar Entertainment
- Members: Jihwan; Junhyung

2BiC (Korean: 투빅; short for To Be Continued) is a South Korean duo formed by Nextar Entertainment in Seoul, South Korea. They debuted on March 14, 2012, with "Made Yet Another Woman Cry".

== Members ==
- Jihwan (지환)
- Junhyung (준형)

== Discography ==
=== Studio albums ===
Title	Album details	Peak chart positions
Title	Album details	KOR
Back to Black	Released: March 15, 2013; Label: Nextar Entertainment, LOEN Entertainment; Formats: CD, digital download	42
Back to Black	Re-released June 5, 2013 (as Return); Label: Nextar Entertainment, LOEN Entertainment; Formats: CD, digital download	—

=== Extended plays ===
Title	EP details	Peak chart positions	Sales
Title	EP details	KOR	Sales
Hu+man	Released: June 22, 2012; Label: Nextar Entertainment, LOEN Entertainment; Formats: CD, digital download	27	KOR: 682
Soul Mate	Released: April 10, 2014; Label: Nextar Entertainment, LOEN Entertainment; Formats: CD, digital download	—	—N/a
Soul Mate	Re-released: June 25, 2014 (as Walk Backward); Label: Nextar Entertainment, LOEN Entertainment; Formats: CD, digital download	—	—N/a
Genuine	Released: November 26, 2014; Label: Nextar Entertainment, LOEN Entertainment; Formats: CD, digital download	—	—N/a
Genuine	Re-released: December 23, 2014; Label: Nextar Entertainment, LOEN Entertainment; Formats: CD, digital download	41	—N/a
Return 2BiC	Released: October 6, 2015; Label: Nextar Entertainment, LOEN Entertainment; Formats: CD, digital download	38	—N/a
Fall in 2BiC	Released: September 29, 2016; Label: Nextar Entertainment, Genie Music; Formats: CD, digital download	—	—N/a
I Guess We Were Really in Love	Released: February 23, 2017; Label: Nextar Entertainment, Genie Music; Formats: CD, digital download	—	—N/a

=== Single albums ===
Title	Album details
CS Numbers	Released: September 3, 2013; Label: Nextar Entertainment, CS Happy Entertainment; Formats: CD, digital download

=== Singles ===
Title	Year	Peak chart positions	Sales (DL)	Album
Title	Year	KOR	Sales (DL)	Album
"Made Yet Another Woman Cry" (또 한 여잘 울렸어)	2012	42	KOR: 202,853	Hu+man
"Promise You" (나이기를)	2012	72	KOR: 55,890	Hu+man
"Love Again" feat. Ailee	2012	19	KOR: 629,304	Hu+man
"24 Hours Later" (24시간후)	2012	27	KOR: 198,305	Back to Black
"Did You Forget" (다 잊었니)	2012	17	KOR: 284,510	Back to Black
"Bye Bye Love"	2013	21	KOR: 186,177	Back to Black
"Return" (회복이 급해) feat. Harim, Hotoo	2013	14	KOR: 292,934	Return
"No More" (단, 하루) feat. Baechigi	2013	21	KOR: 162,232	CS Numbers
"She" feat. 79	2013	22	KOR: 106,126	Non-album singles
"Lonely Christmas"	2013	41	KOR: 104,837	Non-album singles
"I Love You" (행복하기를)	2014	28	KOR: 118,996	Non-album singles
"Your Love"	2014	26	KOR: 70,400	Soul Mate
"Love Game" (요즘 바쁜가봐)	2014	23	KOR: 441,515	Soul Mate
"Walk Backward" (뒤로걷기)	2014	26	KOR: 71,169	Walk Backward
"If We Love Again" (우리 다시 사랑한다면)	2014	26	KOR: 176,691	Genuine
"Don't Know Her" (걔 성격 몰라?)	2014	58	KOR: 44,662	Genuine
"It's Summer" (여름특집)	2015	43	KOR: 62,542	Non-album single
"I Will Love You Like Now" (지금처럼 사랑할게)	2015	22	KOR: 116,598	Return 2BiC
"Love Memories" (사랑한 그때처럼)	2016	75	KOR: 30,720	Non-album singles
"Your's Mine" (니꺼내꺼)	2016	40	KOR: 104,066	Non-album singles
"The Day Of Us" (그날의 우리)	2016	—	—N/a	Fall in 2BiC
"Close to You" feat. Kassy	2016	—	—N/a	Fall in 2BiC
"This Road with You" (함께 걷는 길)	2016	—	—N/a	Fall in 2BiC
"Missing You" (니가 그리워) feat. Kassy	2016	91	KOR: 23,209	I Guess We Were Really in Love
"I Guess We Were Really in Love" (많이 사랑했나 보다)	2017	—	—N/a	I Guess We Were Really in Love
"After Love" (그 와중에)	2017	—	KOR: 13,445	Non-album single
"—" denotes releases that did not chart.

=== Collaborations ===
Year	Title	Other artist(s)
2012	"On Nights Like Tonight" (오늘같은 밤이면)	Davichi
2017	"Love Is Idle" (함께. 넷. 사랑은 공전)	Green Spring Romance

=== Soundtrack appearances ===
Year	Title	Album
2013	"I'm Loving You" (사랑하고 있습니다)	Good Doctor OST
2016	"Hold Back" (참아)	Goodbye Mr. Black OST
2016	"Mr. Trouble"	Listen to Love OST
2018	"Heart"	Are You Human? OST
