= Never Ever (Jiyeon EP) =

2014 EP by Jiyeon

- Digital cover

EP by Jiyeon
- Released: May 20, 2014
- Recorded: 2013–2014
- Genre: K-pop; dance-pop; electropop
- Length: 19:46
- Label: Core Contents; KT Music
- Producer: Kwon Shi-bong

Jiyeon chronology
Never Ever (2014)	Senpass (2019)

Singles from Never Ever
- 1. "1 Minute 1 Second (Never Ever)" Released: May 20, 2014

Never Ever is the debut extended play by South Korean singer Jiyeon. It was released on May 20, 2014, by Core Contents Media. "1 Minute 1 Second (Never Ever)" was released as the lead single.

== Release ==
On April 2, 2014 it was announced that Jiyeon would have a solo album. Core Contents Media released a statement saying, "Jiyeon’s solo concept is sexy and will be similar to Park Jiyoon's 'Coming of Age Ceremony', but with a modern 2014-esque twist."

On May 20, 2014 the extended play Never Ever was released along with the music video for the title track "1 Minute 1 Second (Never Ever)" and a dance practice video. "1 Minute, 1 Second (Never Ever)" is a medium-tempo song produced by Duble Sidekick. The EP also includes the melancholic "Marionette" and "Yeouido Cherry Blossom", a song by composer Ahn Young-min. On May 23, 2014, it was announced that Jiyeon had been forced to change the dance for "1 Minute 1 Second (Never Ever)" due to the hip dance being deemed too sexy and provocative for the public. A news release from MBK Entertainment said "It is true that we received the call to adjust the mentioned dance from the major broadcast station reps... We added the sexy hip dance to the beginning and middle of the performance dance and music video not to give an erotic feeling, but rather to match the atmosphere of the sensitive dance song '1 Minute 1 Second'... However, we do think that the major broadcast music show reps do have a point, so we have decided to show a modified dance to the viewers."

== Reception ==
=== Critical reception ===
"Never Ever" received generally positive reviews from critics. PopMatters praised Jiyeon's emotional vocals that makes it powerful and relatable. The magazine especially praised the music video and the choreography "but it’s really the music video, with the unique choreography and powerful message that are going to be remembered."

=== Commercial performance ===
The EP reached number 3 on the Gaon Weekly Albums Chart. The title track "1 Minute 1 Second (Never Ever)" made it to number 17 on the Gaon Weekly Digital Chart.

== Track listing ==
Never Ever
No.	Title	Lyrics	Music	Length
1.	"1 Minute 1 Second (Never Ever)" (1분 1초; 1 Bun 1 Cho)	Duble Sidekick, David Kim	Duble Sidekick, Radio Galaxy	3:30
2.	"Yeouido Cherry Blossom" (여의도 벚꽃길; Yeouido Beotkkotgil)	Ahn Young Min	Ahn Young Min	2:58
3.	"Marionette" (꼭두각시; Kkokdugaksi)	Tenzo & Tasco	Tenzo & Tasco	3:25
4.	"1 Minute 1 Second (Never Ever)" (Instrumental)		Duble Sidekick, Radio Galaxy	3:30
5.	"Yeouido Cherry Blossom" (Instrumental)		Ahn Young Min	2:58
6.	"Marionette" (Instrumental)		Tenzo & Tasco	3:25
Total length:				19:46

== Charts and sales ==
=== Albums chart ===
Chart	Peak position
Gaon Weekly Albums Chart	3
Gaon Monthly Albums Chart	11
Gaon Yearly Albums Chart	95

=== Sales and certifications ===
Chart	Amount
Gaon physical sales	15,639

== Accolades ==
=== Awards and nominations ===
Award	Year	Category	Nominated work	Result	Ref.
Gaon Chart Music Awards	2014	Social Star Award	Never Ever	Nominated	
Seoul Music Awards	2014	Bonsang Award	Never Ever	Nominated	
Seoul Music Awards	2014	Popularity Award	Never Ever	Nominated	
Seoul Music Awards	2014	Hallyu Special Award	Never Ever	Nominated	
Soompi Gayo Awards	2014	Best Female Solo	Never Ever	Nominated	
YinYueTai V-Chart Awards	2015	Best Female Singer - Korea	Jiyeon	Won	
YinYueTai V-Chart Awards	2015	Favorite Artist of the Year	Jiyeon	Nominated	

=== Listicles ===
Year	Publication	Listicle	Recipient	Rank	Ref.
2014	PopMatters	The Best Kpop of 2014	"Never Ever"	Placed	

== Release history ==
Country	Date	Format	Label
Worldwide	May 20, 2014	Digital download	Core Contents Media; KT Music
South Korea	May 22, 2014	CD, digital download	Core Contents Media; KT Music
