= Lee Ho-jung =

Lee Ho-jung may refer to:

- Lee Ho-jung (figure skater)
- Lee Ho-jung (actress)
