= Jeon So-nee =

South Korean actress (born 1991)

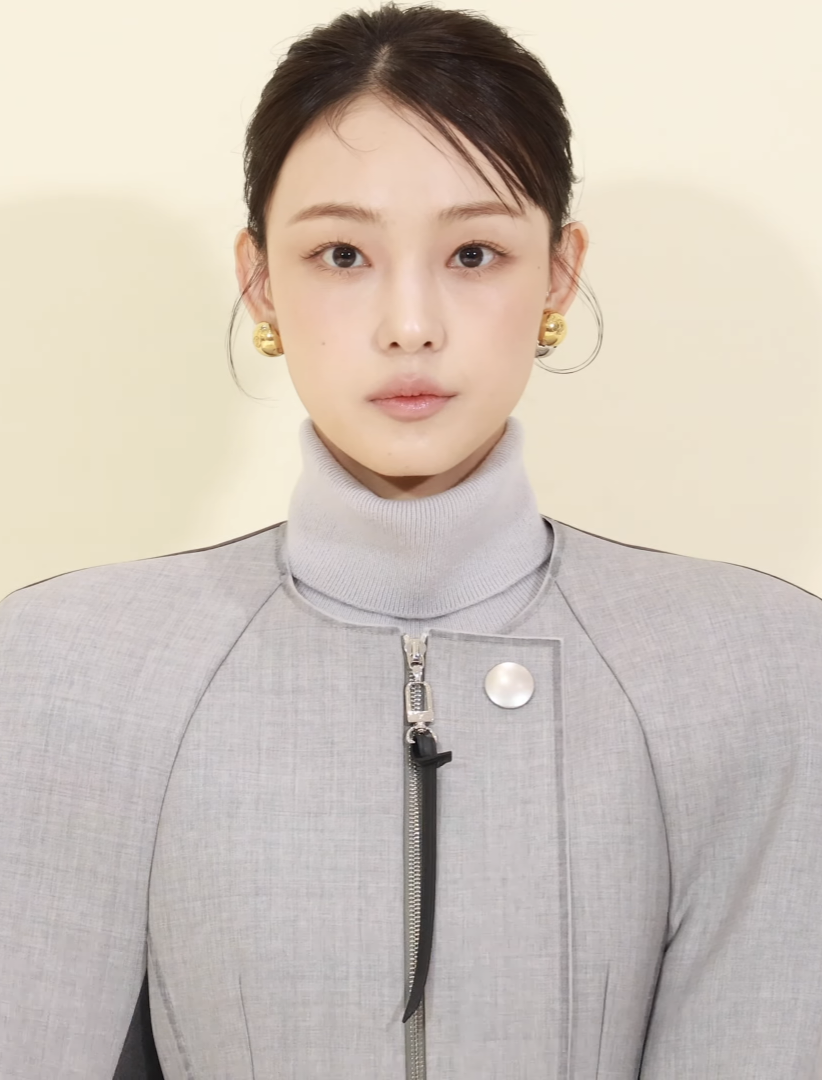
- Jeon in July 2024
- Born: March 20, 1991 (age 35); South Korea
- Education: Seoul Institute of the Arts
- Occupation: Actress
- Years active: 2014–present
- Agent: Fable Company
- Mother: Go Jae-suk

Korean name
- Hangul: 전소니
- RR: Jeon Soni
- MR: Chŏn Soni

Jeon So-nee (Korean: 전소니; born March 20, 1991) is a South Korean actress. She is known for her television series in Encounter (2018–19), When My Love Blooms (2020) and Our Blooming Youth (2023), as well as the film Soulmate (2023).

== Early life ==
Jeon's mother is Go Jae-suk of the 1970s K-pop musical duo Bunny Girls. She graduated from the Seoul Institute of the Arts.

== Career ==
Jeon made her acting debut through the independent film Photo in 2014 while attending the Department of Broadcasting Entertainment at Seoul Institute of the Arts. She decided to become an actress when she worked on short films with film majors during college. In January 2018, she was selected as one of the most notable new actresses of 2018 in the 1140th issue of Cine 21.

Jeon received attention through her supporting role in Encounter as Park Bo-gum's friend. She gained her first lead television role through the tvN drama When My Love Blooms in April 2020 alongside Yoo Ji-tae, Lee Bo-young and Park Jinyoung. In July 2020, Jeon was confirmed to star in the Korean remake of Chinese film Soul Mate alongside Kim Da-mi and Byeon Woo-seok. On December 31, she was confirmed as the female lead of KakaoTV drama Writing Your Fate alongside Ki Do-hoon.

In July 2023, Jeon became a free agent after her contract with Management Soop ended. Jeon then signed an exclusive contract with Fable Company, a new entertainment agency to which Choi Woo-sik belongs.

In 2025, Jeon starred in the Netflix romantic comedy television series Melo Movie wherein she played Son Ju-a, a screenwriter. In the same year, she led another Netflix series, the crime thriller As You Stood By and played Jo Eun-su, a VIP department store employee.

== Filmography ==
=== Film ===
Key
†	Denotes films that have not yet been released

Year	Title	Role	Notes	Ref.
2014	Photo		Short film	
2015	Untouchable Lawman	Churchwoman		
2016	Juvenile Crime Law	Bank clerk	Short film	
2016	Write or Dance	So-nee		
2017	Space x Girl		Short film	
2017	An Algorithm	Yun-jeong		
2018	After My Death	Kyung-min		
2019	Jo Pil-ho: The Dawning Rage	Jang Mi-na		
2019	Ghost Walk	Yoo Hyo-yeon		
2023	Soulmate	Go Ha-eun		

=== Television series ===
Key
†	Denotes television productions that have not yet been released

Year	Title	Role	Ref.
2016	Deux Yeoza		
2016	72 Seconds 3		
2016	Horror Delivery Service		
2018–2019	Encounter	Jo Hye-in	
2020	When My Love Blooms	Young Yoon Jisoo	
2021	Writing Your Destiny	Go Che-kyung	
2023	Our Blooming Youth	Min Jae-yi	
2024	Parasyte: The Grey	Jeong Su-in	
2025	Melo Movie	Son Joo-ah	
2025	As You Stood By	Jo Eun-su	
2026	If Wishes Could Kill	Kang Ha-young / Ha-sal	

=== Music video appearances ===
Year	Title	Artist(s)	Ref.
2016	"How Do You Think?" (어떻게 생각해)	Cheeze	
2022	"Because We Loved" (우린 그렇게 사랑해서)	Kang Min-kyung and Choi Jung-hoon	

== Accolades ==
=== Awards and nominations ===
Name of the award ceremony, year presented, category, nominee of the award, and the result of the nomination
Award ceremony	Year	Category	Nominee / Work	Result	Ref.
Asia Contents Awards & Global OTT Awards	2024	Best Newcomer Actress	Parasyte: The Grey	Nominated	
Blue Dragon Series Awards	2024	Best New Actress	Parasyte: The Grey	Nominated	
Director's Cut Awards	2019	Best New Actress	Jo Pil-ho: The Dawning Rage	Nominated	
Golden Cinematography Awards	2023	Special Jury Award	Soulmate	Won	
Marie Claire Asia Star Awards	2023	Face of Asia Award	Soulmate	Won	
Marie Claire Asia Star Awards	2025	Face of Asia Award	As You Stood By	Won	
Wildflower Film Awards	2020	Best Supporting Actress	Ghost Walk	Nominated	

=== Listicles ===
Name of publisher, year listed, name of listicle, and placement
Publisher	Year	Listicle	Placement	Ref.
Cine21	2018	Rising Star Actors in Korean Movies in 2018	Placed	
