= Song of the Bandits =

2023 South Korean Netflix TV series

- Promotional poster
- Hangul: 도적: 칼의 소리
- Hanja: 盜賊: 칼의 소리
- Lit.: Thief: Sound of the Sword
- RR: Dojeok: karui sori
- MR: Tojŏk: k'arŭi sori
- Genre: Period drama; Action
- Created by: Netflix
- Developed by: Studio Dragon (production planning)
- Written by: Han Jung-hoon
- Directed by: Hwang Jun-hyeok; Park Hyun-suk
- Starring: Kim Nam-gil; Seohyun; Yoo Jae-myung; Lee Hyun-wook; Lee Ho-jung
- Music by: Kim Jang-woo
- Opening theme: "Bandit" by Taeil
- Country of origin: South Korea
- Original language: Korean
- No. of episodes: 9

Production
- Executive producers: Kim Ryoon-hee (C.P.); Kim Na-kyung; Cho Youn-hee
- Producers: Kim Jey-hyun; Lee Ki-hyuk; Huh Gun; Choi Ho-sung
- Camera setup: Multi camera
- Running time: 48–69 minutes
- Production companies: Studio Dragon; Urban Works Media; Baram Pictures
- Budget: ₩30 billion

Original release
- Network: Netflix
- Release: September 22, 2023

Song of the Bandits (Korean: 도적: 칼의 소리) is a South Korean television series directed by Hwang Jun-hyeok, written by Han Jeong-hoon, and starring Kim Nam-gil, Seohyun, Yoo Jae-myung, Lee Hyun-wook, and Lee Ho-jung. It was released on Netflix on September 22, 2023.

== Synopsis ==
Set in 1920s, during the turbulent period of Japanese occupation, following the disbanding of the Korean military and police and other repressions (which followed the Japan–Korea Treaty of 1905), many people of Joseon fled across the Tumen River to Gando, a part of China (Qing), some to make a living and others to form righteous armies, and fight for independence for Korea. This is a tale where those who head to Gando, a land of lawlessness, unite as one to protect the homeland of the Koreans. The story is a prelude to the Gando massacre.

== Cast ==
=== Main ===
- Kim Nam-gil as Lee Yoon

A former Japanese soldier who left for Gando, leaving everything behind and became a bandit to protect the land and people.

- Seohyun as Nam Hee-shin

An independence activist working as the head of the Railway Bureau of the Japanese Government-General of Korea. She has hidden her true allegiance.

- Yoo Jae-myung as Choi Chung-soo

A landowner of a Korean village located in Gando who is an independence activist.

- Lee Hyun-wook as Lee Gwang-il

A major of the 37th Infantry Regiment of the 19th Division of the Imperial Japanese Empire who gets entangled with Yoon in a terrible relationship.

- Lee Ho-jung as Eon Nyeon

A contract killer who goes to Gando after being commissioned to murder Yoon.

=== Supporting ===
==== People around Lee Yoon ====
- Lee Jae-gyun as Chorang-i

A member of the bandits.

- Kim Do-yoon as Kang San-gun

A member of the bandits.

- Cha Yeop as Geum-so

A member of the bandits.

- Cha Chung-hwa as Kim Seon-bok

==== Others ====
- Kim Seol-jin as Kimura

Jang Ki-ryong's subordinate.

- Ko Kyu-pil as Han Tae-ju

A Japanese soldier and subordinate of Lee Gwang-il.

- Park Sang-won as Ishida

A Japanese soldier of the 19th division and subordinate of Lee Gwang-il.

- Han Gyu-won as Jang Ki-ryong

A leader bandit of North Gando who harasses the independence army under the protection of the Japanese military.

- Kim Min as Jin-san

A member of the bandit group who is Jang Ki-ryong's subordinate.

- Park Gwang-jae as Heuk-dong

A member of the bandit group who is Jang Ki-ryong's subordinate.

== Production ==
In August 2022, filming of the series was suspended due to heavy rain. Filming ended on February 2, 2023.

== Original soundtrack ==
The original soundtrack for Song of the Bandits was released digitally on September 22, 2023. It includes five English-language songs by Taeil (of NCT), Seori, Karina (of Aespa), and Jeonghum Band.

Song of the Bandits OST

Soundtrack album by Various artists
- Released: 2023
- Genre: Soundtrack
- Language: English
- Labels: Genie Music; Stone Music Entertainment; Netflix

Track listing
No.	Title	Lyrics	Music	Artist	Length
1.	"Bandit"	Jay Kim; Kim Beom-ju; Kim Si-hyeok	Jay Kim; Kim Beom-ju; Kim Si-hyeok	Taeil (NCT)	3:23
2.	"Hitman"	Jay Kim; Kim Beom-ju; Kim Si-hyeok; Nam Gi-moon	Jay Kim; Kim Beom-ju; Kim Si-hyeok; Nam Gi-moon	Seori	3:42
3.	"Sad Hitman"	Jay Kim; Kim Beom-ju; Kim Si-hyeok	Jay Kim; Kim Beom-ju; Kim Si-hyeok	Seori	4:02
4.	"Sad Waltz"	Jay Kim	Jung Min-kyung; Hwang Myeong-heum	Karina (Aespa)	3:49
5.	"I'm Leaving"	Jay Kim	Jung Min-kyung; Hwang Myeong-heum	Jeonghum Band	3:23
Total length:					18:19

== Reception ==
On the review aggregator website Rotten Tomatoes, 86% of 7 critics' reviews are positive, with an average rating of 7.8/10.
