= Jo Pil-ho: The Dawning Rage =

2019 South Korean film by Lee Jeong-beom

- Theatrical release poster
- Hangul: 악질경찰
- RR: Akjilgyeongchal
- MR: Akchilgyŏngch'al
- Directed by: Lee Jeong-beom
- Written by: Lee Jeong-beom
- Produced by: Kim-Jho Gwangsoo
- Starring: Lee Sun-kyun; Jeon So-nee; Park Hae-joon
- Cinematography: Kim Sung-an
- Edited by: Nam Na-yeong
- Music by: Shim Hyun-jung
- Production companies: Dice Film; Generation Blue Films
- Distributed by: Warner Bros. Pictures
- Release date: March 20, 2019
- Running time: 127 minutes
- Country: South Korea
- Language: Korean
- Box office: US$2 million

Jo Pil-ho: The Dawning Rage (Korean: 악질경찰; RR: Akjilgyeongchal; lit. 'Bad Police') is a 2019 South Korean action film written and directed by Lee Jeong-beom. Starring Lee Sun-kyun, Jeon So-nee, and Park Hae-joon in the lead roles, this is director Lee's fourth feature length film as a director and his first since No Tears for the Dead, which was released in 2014. The film follows a corrupt homicide detective whose involvement in a police warehouse explosion is suspected, and seeks the help of a teenage girl to uncover the conspiracy while being chased and attacked by the conspirators.

Distributed theatrically by Warner Bros. Pictures, the film was released in South Korea on 20 March 2019 and received mixed reviews from critics. The action scenes and performances were praised but the writing and the implementation of a subplot related to the Sewol Ferry incident were criticized. It became a commercial failure, selling a total of 261,248 tickets before the end of its theatrical run. On 3 May 2019, it was made available to stream via Netflix.

== Plot ==
Jo Pil-ho is an Ansan-based corrupt homicide detective. His money is tied up in a suspect real estate deal, with Internal Affairs breathing down his neck. Desperate, he robs a police warehouse with the help of Gi-chul, his informant turned reluctant partner-in-crime. After Gi-chul breaks in, the warehouse explodes, killing Gi-chul and leaving Jo unconscious.

At the scene, a fireman steals Gi-chul's phone and hands it to an unknown party for forensic recovery. The warehouse's owner's body is found the next day in an alleged suicide. The fireman is also killed in a restroom. It is revealed that the explosion destroyed all evidence implicating the CEO of the largest Korean corporation named the Taesung Group, in a multi-million dollar scandal. Gi-chul's phone contains footage of Kwon Tae-Ju, a Taesung Group employee, breaking into the warehouse before the explosion.

Waking up in the hospital, Jo is questioned by the officers. As he denies involvement, Jo learns that Gi-chul was murdered before the explosion. Jo gets to Gi-chul's apartment where the two stashed their earnings, but the money had been stolen. Jo views CCTV footage and identifies Jang Mi-na, Gi-chul's girlfriend. At her workplace, he meets the father of Song Ji-won, Mi-na's close friend. Ji-won was a female officer who died in the Sewol Ferry incident.

Jo tracks down Mi-na to a motel and catches her and her friend So-hee. Wholly focused on retrieving his money, he handcuffs them both to his car and drives to Mina's address, ignoring Mi-na's claim that she received a video message from Gi-chul. Mi-na tazes Jo, causing him to crash his car, and escapes with So-hee.

Back at the station, Jo learns that Gi-chul sent the footage to Mina's phone before his death. Public prosecutor Nam Sung-sik tells Jo to retrieve the footage in exchange for getting his name cleared. To his relief, Jo finds Mi-na's phone in his car (having confiscated it from her earlier) but it is locked. He goes to her address and finds part of his money stash, but runs into Kwon. After a brief fight, Kwon knocks Jo unconscious just as Mi-na gets home. Kwon prepares to kill her and pin the blame on Jo. Jo wakes up and tackles Kwon, causing both to fall from the apartment. The noises catch the neighbor's attention, and Kwon retreats.

Jo drives Mi-na away in his car. She agrees to unlock the phone if that he pays for So-hee's abortion at an illegal abortion clinic. He complies and, after the abortionist pays him for one night with Mi-na (mistaking him for their pimp), Jo savagely beats up the man.

Nam calls Jo, who reveals he has Mi-na with him, and agrees to deliver her as a key witness in exchange for a promotion. Jo takes the girls to his house and leaves So-hee under the care of Hee-sook, his wife. As he drives Mi-na to the rendezvous point, he learns that she had been fighting depression and suicidal thoughts since Ji-won's death. He promises to take her back to Ji-won's father's diner for a meal after she finishes giving her testimony.

The rendezvous, however, turns out to be an ambush as Nam is on Taesung Group's payroll. They torture Jo and threatens to kill Mi-na. Jo lies and convinces them to spare Mi-na and him in exchange for the remaining footage. Kwon agrees and releases Mi-na. However, the girl, having lost her will to live, jumps off the building. Jo is then taken to meet CEO of the Taesung Group, Jung Yi-Hyang, who offers him money in exchange for the video.

A short while later, on the day when Taesung Group organizes a scholarship event, Jo visits their headquarter. He calls Internal Affairs officer Kim Min-jae to claim involvement with Taesung Group, and challenges the man to catch him. Jo assembles a gun made from non-metallic parts and prepares to kill Jung.

However, his actions are discovered. He is subdued, cuffed and thrown inside a soaking tub to drown. While Jung is addressing the students, Jo escapes his confinement. He attacks the guards and retrieves his gun, and fatally shoots Kwon. He then heads to the stage and shoots Jung in the head, before Kim shoots him.

An employee of Taesung Group steps forward to testify their involvement in destroying the evidence. Nam is also involved. Jo survives the wounds and is charged with murder. Hee-sook adopts So-hee.

On the way to the trial, Jo hallucinates Mi-na sitting among friends, smiling at him.

== Cast ==
- Lee Sun-kyun as Jo Pil-ho, a corrupt homicide detective
- Jeon So-nee as Mi-na, a teenage high school student
- Park Hae-joon as Kwon Tae-joo, the right hand of Taesung Group
- Song Young-chang as Jung Yi-Hyang, the CEO of Taesung Group
- Park Byung-eun as Nam Sung-sik, a corrupt public prosecutor
- Jung Ga-ram as Han Gi-chul, Jo Pil-ho's partner
- Kim Min-jae as Internal affairs officer Kim Min-jae
- Lee Yoo-young as Yang Hee-sook, Jo Pil-ho's wife
- Yoon Ji-on as Conscripted policeman
- Im Hyeong-gook as Song Ji-won's father
- Park So-eun as Song Ji-won
- Kwon Han-sol as So-hee, Mi-na's friend
- Oh Hee-joon as Drug addict
- Kim Kwak-kyung-hee as Sprout Villa madame
- Nam Moon-chul as Violent crimes investigation team leader
- Chang Ryul as Violent crimes investigation team member
- Jo Philpott as Corrupt headmistress

== Production ==
=== Development ===
I cannot forget the shock I felt back in 2015 when I visited Danwon High School - what I saw there was very different from what I had been seeing in the news. I wanted to deliver the truth about the whole story - especially the emotions of the victim's [friends and families] - so I started researching the case. It took me five years to make the movie happen, and in the process, I did a lot of self-censorship.

— Lee Jeong-beom on handling the presentation of the Sewol Ferry incident in the film.

Lee Sun-kyun, who plays the titular protagonist, felt that his character was closer to a criminal despite being a cop. He tried to emphasize the ill-natured and ugly side of his character, making it important for him to express his emotional changes later upon facing corruption. He wanted the audience to be shocked by his bad character.

Director Lee Jeong-beom was initially hesitant to handle the Sewol Ferry incident within a commercial film, but was unable to forget the shock he felt back in 2015 when he visited Danwon High School and found things to be different than what was being presented in the news. He started researching the case because he wanted to tell the true story, especially involving the emotions of the victims' families. He did a lot of self-censorship in the process of making the film which took him five years.

=== Casting ===
Lee Jeong-beom needed an actor able to cover the range of the main character whose way of thinking drastically changes, and he was impressed with Lee Sun-kyun's facial expressions while depicting a state of an enormous gap in himself "from when he is peaceful and when he is in hell." He also felt that Park Hae-joon's face had a beast-like, violent side that erupted when met with Lee Sun-kyun. Park, who played Kwon Tae-joo, felt that it was physically hard for him and he had to prepare and train a lot, but the requirement was always more. Jeon So-nee, the actress who played Mi-na, felt that her character was "not such a bad kid." This was her first leading role in a film.

== Soundtrack ==
Jo Pil-ho: The Dawning Rage

Soundtrack album by Various artists
- Released: 26 June 2019
- Length: 44:52
- Label: Pony Canyon Korea

The soundtrack was released by Pony Canyon Korea on 26 June 2019.

Track listing
No.	Title	Artist	Length
1.	"Jo Pil-ho: The Dawning Rage"	Shim Hyun Jung	2:55
2.	"Dirty Cop"	Shim Hyun Jung	2:11
3.	"Noisy Police Station"	Park Ae Ri	0:43
4.	"Na Oneul Do"	Jeon Hye Sun	3:06
5.	"ATM"	Park Ae Ri, Shim Hyun Jung	1:56
6.	"The Storage"	Seol Yeon Ji & Shim Hyun Jung	1:15
7.	"Plan Screwed"	Park Ae Ri	1:42
8.	"Video Clip"	Shim Hyun Jung	1:18
9.	"Powerful Man"	Shim Hyun Jung	1:26
10.	"Interrogation"	Shim Hyun Jung	3:51
11.	"Tae-ju's Threat"	Shim Hyun Jung	0:54
12.	"Confrontation"	Seol Yeon Ji	3:12
13.	"Girl bleeds"	Shim Hyun Jung	0:56
14.	"Secret Trade"	Shim Hyun Jung	0:55
15.	"Mi-na In Rain"	Shim Hyun Jung	2:34
16.	"Unexpected Men"	Shim Hyun Jung	1:38
17.	"On The Roof"	Shim Hyun Jung	1:16
18.	"Pil-ho's Memory"	Shim Hyun Jung	1:26
19.	"Letter From Mi-na"	Shim Hyun Jung	2:57
20.	"Loading A Gun"	Shim Hyun Jung	2:01
21.	"To Bathtub"	Shim Hyun Jung	1:00
22.	"Getting Out"	Shim Hyun Jung	1:20
23.	"Bloody Fight"	Seol Yeon Ji	1:38
24.	"Gun Down"	Shim Hyun Jung	2:42

== Release ==
The film received an R rating from the Korea Media Rating Board on the account of strong themes, violence, language and imitation risk. The film was released theatrically in South Korea on 20 March 2019 alongside Money and Idol.

It was released on May 3, 2019, on Netflix streaming.

== Critical reception ==
The film received mixed reviews from critics.

Yoon Min-sik from The Korea Herald praised the action and some of the humor between the lead actors, but mainly criticized the inclusion of a subplot related to the Sewol Ferry incident as the film was not about it. Brian Costello from Common Sense Media felt the film had good plot twists but felt the theme of moral ambiguity had been done in multiple action films, and that it felt like a "bombastic" action film that was decent at times but gave a sense of Déjà vu. Shim Sun-ah from Yonhap News Agency praised the action sequences and witty lines, but felt the film's intro and ending scenes were "long and confusing", and reminded the viewers of its identity as a commercial action film.

== Box office ==
Released on 20 March 2019, the film opened third at the box office and recorded 124,174 admissions in its first weekend, with a total of 189,604 admissions in the first week. It faced competition from Money that opened on the same date and recorded 1,536,469 admissions in the first week. In the second week, following the release of Us that opened at number one position with Money on number two, the film saw a decline when its ranking fell to sixth and the weekend admissions amounted to 17,294. It earned 254,451 admissions in the second week.
