= Money Flower =

2017 South Korean television series

- Promotional poster
- Hangul: 돈꽃
- RR: Donkkot
- MR: Tonkkot
- Genre: Romance; Business; Drama
- Created by: Kim Seung-mo (MBC)
- Written by: Lee Myung-hee
- Directed by: Kim Hee-won
- Starring: Jang Hyuk; Park Se-young; Jang Seung-jo
- Music by: Park Se-jun (CP)
- Country of origin: South Korea
- Original language: Korean
- No. of episodes: 24 (Note: To circumvent Korean laws that prevent commercial breaks in the middle of an episode, two 60-minute episodes are being shown each night with a commercial break between the two.)

Production
- Executive producer: Nam Gung-kyeon
- Running time: 60 minutes
- Production company: UFO Production

Original release
- Network: MBC TV
- Release: November 11, 2017 – February 3, 2018

Money Flower (Korean: 돈꽃; RR: Donkkot) is a South Korean television series starring Jang Hyuk, Park Se-young and Jang Seung-jo. It aired every Saturday from 11 November 2017 on MBC from 8:45 p.m. to 11:00 p.m. (KST), 2 episodes a day. It tells the story of people who are driven by the illusion that they can control money, but in fact they are the ones being dominated by greed.

== Synopsis ==
Kang Pil-joo (Jang Hyuk) is envied by many inside the Cheong-A Group, where he enjoys the esteem and respect of the Honorary chairman. Keeping his real identity a secret from the Cheong-A Group founding family, he has served as their loyal servant from his teens, part of a plot to avenge his family and a tragic childhood. He plots to have Na Mo-hyun (Park Se-young) fall in love with young Cheong-A Group scion Jang Boo-cheon (Jang Seung-jo), but he finds himself falling in love with her free-spirited personality. "Money Flower" portrays how the lives of Pil-joo, Mo-hyun, who seeks love, and Boo-cheon, Pil-joo's "master" and companion are intertwined by fate and design. Their fates are pulled into a vortex of greed, power, desire and love.

== Cast ==
=== Main cast ===
- Jang Hyuk as Kang Pil-joo / Jang Eun-cheon / Jo In-ho (37) : managing director and attorney at Cheong-A Group
  - Nam Ki-won as young Kang Pil-joo
  - Jo Byeong-kyu as teen Kang Pil-joo
- Park Se-young as Na Mo-hyun (35) : Environmental activist and a substitute science teacher. Won gold in swimming in Korea National Games. She is also a daughter of a prominent politician and Pil-joo's first love.
  - Kim Ji-min as teen Na Mo-hyun
- Jang Seung-jo as Jang Boo-cheon (37) : Scion of Cheong-A Group fortune and son of Jung Mal-ran
  - Chae Sang-woo as teen Jang Boo-cheon
- Lee Mi-sook as Jung Mal-ran (59): eldest daughter-in-law of Jang Kook-hwan, Cheong-A Foundation director
- Lee Soon-jae as Jang Kook-hwan (89): founder of Cheong-A corporation
- Han So-hee as Yoon Seo-won (35): secret lover of Jang Boo-cheon, former information desk employee at Cheong-A group office headquarters

=== Supporting cast ===
==== Jang household ====
- Moon Yoo-bin as Jang Yeon-woo (32): younger sister of Jang Boo-cheon, second year resident surgeon
- Sunwoo Jae-duk as Jang Sung-man (60): second son of Jang Kook-hwan
- Shin Young-jin as Park Sun-kyung (56): wife of Jang Sung-man
- Im Kang-sung as Jang Yeo-cheon (36): son of Jang Sung-man
- Yoon Sun-young as Lee Hyun-joo (35): wife of Jang Yeo-cheon, daughter of Hanmin Daily's chairman
- Lee Hang-na as Han Eun Shim (49): live-in partner of Jang Kook-hwan
- Hong Dong-yeong as Jang Ha-jung (5): son of Jang Boo-cheon and Yoon Seo-won
- Jeon Hae-sol as Jang Ha-yoon (5): son of Jang Yeo-cheon and Lee Hyun-joo
- Han Dong-hwan as Jang Soo-man (deceased): eldest son of Jang Kook-hwan

==== Na household ====
- Park Ji-il as Na Gi-chul (60): father of Na Mo-hyun, presidential elect candidate
- Chu Kwi-jang as Bae Jum-sun (57): mother of Na Mo-hyun, restaurant owner
- Dan Woo as Na Doo-hyun (28): younger brother of Na Mo-hyun

==== Others ====
- Ryu Dam as Park Yong-goo (30): good friend of Kang Pil-joo
- Park Jung-hak as Oh Ki-pyung (62): chauffeur of Jung Mal-ran
- Hong Gyung-yun as Go Eun-A (58) : main cook of the Jang family
- Kwon Hyuk as Yang Sang-do (45) : aide of Na Gi-chul
- Kim Ji-sung as Ahn Hee-young (39) : secretary of Jung Mal-ran
- Jeon Jin-ki as Woo Chang-sun (60) : chief of planning department in Cheong-A group
- Hong Hee-won as Ha Yung-do (40) : prosecutor
- Park Sun-woo as Bae Kang-choon (45) : gangster
- Jung Seo-yeon as Ahn Ho-Kyung : mother of Kang Pil-joo

== Reception ==
Viewership ratings for 'Money Flower' started with a modest 10.3% (based on AGB Nielson National) for its first episode. Despite the little promotion it got initially, the ratings rose steadily as it was aired due to the good reviews spread by word-of-mouth, setting high records for itself almost every week to cross the 20% mark by its 20th episode. The media labelled it as a 'masterpiece' and 'well-made drama' with its engaging plot, excellent directing, beautiful background music and the stellar performances of its cast. It was ranked first among TV dramas in the same time slot for 10 consecutive weeks since it started.

== Original soundtrack ==
=== Part 1 ===
Released on November 11, 2017
No.	Title	Artist	Length
1.	"My Way"	Lee Soo (MC the Max)	4:38
2.	"My Way" (Inst.)		4:38

=== Part 2 ===
Released on December 30, 2017
No.	Title	Artist	Length
1.	"Flame"	Solji, Hani (EXID)	3:59
2.	"Flame" (Inst.)		3:59

=== Part 3 ===
Released on January 6, 2018
No.	Title	Artist	Length
1.	"Healing"	Lee Seok-hoon (SG Wannabe), Bubble Dia	4:10
2.	"Healing" (Inst.)		4:10

=== Part 4 ===
Released on January 13, 2018
No.	Title	Artist	Length
1.	"Dreamy love"	Hyolyn	4:10
2.	"Dreamy love" (Inst.)		4:10

=== Part 5 ===
Released on January 20, 2018
No.	Title	Artist	Length
1.	"Waiting here for you"	Min Kyung-hoon	4:40
2.	"Waiting here for you" (Inst.)		4:40

== Viewership ==
Money Flower : South Korea viewers per episode (millions)

Episodes	Episode number											
Episodes	1	2	3	4	5	6	7	8	9	10	11	12
1–12	1.695	2.058	1.592	1.962	1.763	2.379	1.729	2.403	1.762	2.723	1.905	2.851
13-24	1.999	2.793	2.651	3.246	2.558	3.250	2.856	3.513	3.207	4.013	3.079	4.085

Source: Audience measurement performed nationwide by Nielsen Korea.

In the table below, the blue numbers represent the lowest ratings and the red numbers represent the highest ratings.

- N/A denotes that the rating is not known.

Ep.	Original broadcast date	Average audience share			
Ep.	Original broadcast date	TNmS		AGB Nielsen	
Ep.	Original broadcast date	Nationwide	Seoul	Nationwide	Seoul
1	November 11, 2017	10.4% (4th)	10.4% (3rd)	10.3% (4th)	10.2% (4th)
2	November 11, 2017	11.7% (2nd)	12.2% (2nd)	12.7% (2nd)	12.6% (2nd)
3	November 18, 2017	8.7% (6th)	8.4% (5th)	10.5% (5th)	10.5% (4th)
4	November 18, 2017	10.2% (3rd)	10.6% (3rd)	12.8% (3rd)	12.6% (3rd)
5	November 25, 2017	9.0% (8th)	8.7% (5th)	11.4% (3rd)	11.4% (3rd)
6	November 25, 2017	11.3% (2nd)	11.0% (2nd)	15.1% (2nd)	14.9% (2nd)
7	December 2, 2017	9.1% (6th)	9.1% (5th)	11.1% (4th)	11.4% (4th)
8	December 2, 2017	12.0% (3rd)	12.5% (2nd)	15.3% (2nd)	15.6% (2nd)
9	December 9, 2017	10.5% (6th)	9.9% (4th)	11.2% (5th)	10.7% (5th)
10	December 9, 2017	14.8% (2nd)	14.5% (2nd)	16.7% (2nd)	16.6% (2nd)
11	December 16, 2017	10.9% (4th)	10.8% (5th)	11.7% (4th)	11.6% (4th)
12	December 16, 2017	14.9% (2nd)	14.7% (2nd)	17.2% (2nd)	17.0% (2nd)
13	December 23, 2017	11.2% (4th)	11.0% (4th)	12.1% (3rd)	11.7% (3rd)
14	December 23, 2017	14.1% (2nd)	13.9% (2nd)	16.5% (2nd)	15.4% (2nd)
15	January 6, 2018 (Note: No episodes were aired on December 30, 2017 due to the 2017 MBC Drama Awards.)	13.4% (4th)	13.2%	15.5% (3rd)	15.7% (3rd)
16	January 6, 2018	15.9% (2nd)	15.8%	18.5% (2nd)	18.5% (2nd)
17	January 13, 2018	13.5% (3rd)	13.1%	14.9% (3rd)	14.5% (3rd)
18	January 13, 2018	16.5% (2nd)	16.1%	18.8% (2nd)	18.4% (2nd)
19	January 20, 2018	14.2% (3rd)	13.9%	17.0% (3rd)	17.1% (3rd)
20	January 20, 2018	16.4% (2nd)	16.3%	20.7% (2nd)	20.6% (2nd)
21	January 27, 2018	15.5% (3rd)	14.7%	18.3% (3rd)	19.1% (3rd)
22	January 27, 2018	19.1% (2nd)	18.9% (2nd)	22.8% (2nd)	23.0% (2nd)
23	February 3, 2018	16.0% (3rd)	15.8% (2nd)	18.0% (3rd)	18.2% (3rd)
24	February 3, 2018	21.1% (2nd)	20.8% (2nd)	23.9% (2nd)	24.0% (2nd)
Average		13.4%	12.7%	15.5%	15.5%
Special	November 22, 2017	—N/a	—N/a	3.7%	—N/a
Special	November 23, 2017	—N/a	—N/a	3.4%	—N/a

== Awards and nominations ==
Year	Award	Category	Recipient	Result	Ref.
2017	MBC Drama Awards	Grand Prize, Daesang	Jang Hyuk	Nominated	
2017	MBC Drama Awards	Drama of the Year	Money Flower	Nominated	
2017	MBC Drama Awards	Top Excellence Award, Actor in Weekend Drama	Jang Hyuk	Won	
2017	MBC Drama Awards	Top excellence award, Actress in weekend drama	Lee Mi-sook	Won	
2017	MBC Drama Awards	Excellence award, Actor in weekend drama	Jang Seung-jo	Won	
2017	MBC Drama Awards	Popularity award, actor	Jang Hyuk	Nominated	
2017	MBC Drama Awards	Best New Actress	Han So-hee	Nominated	
2018	54th Baeksang Arts Awards	Best Actor (Television)	Jang Hyuk	Nominated	
2018	11th Korea Drama Awards	Grand Prize	Lee Mi-sook	Nominated	
2018	11th Korea Drama Awards	Best Drama	Money Flower	Nominated	
2018	11th Korea Drama Awards	Best Screenplay	Lee Myung-hee	Nominated	
2018	11th Korea Drama Awards	Excellence Award, actress	Park Se-young	Nominated	
2018	6th APAN Star Awards	Top Excellence Award, Actor in a Serial Drama	Jang Hyuk	Nominated	
2018	6th APAN Star Awards	Excellence Award, Actor in a Serial Drama	Jang Seung-jo	Won	
2018	6th APAN Star Awards	Excellence Award, Actress in a Serial Drama	Park Se-young	Nominated	
2018	2nd The Seoul Awards	Best Drama	Money Flower	Nominated	
2018	MBC Plus X Genie Music Awards	OST Award	"My Way"	Nominated	

== International Broadcast ==
- Money Flower airs in Singapore, Malaysia, Hong Kong, Indonesia and Brunei on Oh!K beginning 30 Jan 2018.
- Money Flower airs in Japan on KNTV beginning 17 March 2018.
- Money Flower airs in Taiwan on EBC beginning 12 July 2018.
- Money Flower airs in Peru on Willax TV beginning 9 July 2018
- Money Flower airs on Netflix since 2018
- Money Flower airs in India on Amazon Mini TV beginning 25 January 2023.
