= Strangers Again (TV series) =

2023 South Korean television series

- Promotional poster
- Also known as: Can We Be Strangers
- Hangul: 남이 될 수 있을까
- Lit.: Can I Be Someone Else
- RR: Nami doel su isseulkka
- MR: Nami toel su issŭlkka
- Genre: Romance; Legal drama
- Written by: Park Sa-rang
- Directed by: Kim Yang-hee
- Starring: Kang So-ra; Jang Seung-jo
- Music by: Lee Jae-hak
- Country of origin: South Korea
- Original language: Korean
- No. of episodes: 12

Production
- Executive producers: Park Min-seol; Jang Young-mo (CP)
- Producer: Kim Na-young
- Running time: 60 minutes
- Production company: West World Story

Original release
- Network: ENA
- Release: January 18 – February 22, 2023

Strangers Again (Korean: 남이 될 수 있을까) is a 2023 South Korean television series starring Kang So-ra and Jang Seung-jo. It is about the love and growth of divorce lawyers, to whom divorce is easy but separation is difficult. The series is an original drama of Genie TV, and is available for streaming on its platform, and on Viki in selected regions. It also aired on ENA from January 18 to February 22, 2023, every Wednesday and Thursday at 21:00 (KST).

== Synopsis ==
The series follows the story of Oh Ha-ra (Kang So-ra), a star divorce lawyer who is called the goddess of litigation, and her ex-husband Goo Eun-beom (Jang Seung-jo) who is also a talented lawyer. The two live as complete strangers after divorce, and reunite at the same law firm as colleagues.

== Cast ==
=== Main ===
- Kang So-ra as Oh Ha-ra
- Jang Seung-jo as Goo Eun-beom

=== Supporting ===
- Jo Eun-ji as Kang Bi-chwi
- Lee Jae-won as Kwon Si-wook
- Jeon Bae-soo as Seo Han-gil
- Gil Hae-yeon as Hong Yeo-rae
- Mu Jin-sung as Min Jae-gyeom

=== Extended ===
- Park Jeong-won as Ki Seo-hee
- Kim Ro-sa as Jeon Min-kyung
- Shin Joo-hyeop as Sung Chan-young
- Min Chae-min as Ji Ye-seul
- Park Yong-woo as Han Do-woon
- Hwang Ji-ah as Laura

=== Special appearances ===
- Jeong Yu-mi as Na Soo-yeon
- Kim Ha-kyung as Mi-hyang

== Viewership ==
Strangers Again : South Korea viewers per episode (thousands)

Season	Episode number											
Season	1	2	3	4	5	6	7	8	9	10	11	12
1	N/A	N/A	N/A	N/A	269	293	N/A	268	281	293	266	327

Source: Audience measurement performed nationwide by Nielsen Korea.

Average TV viewership ratings
Ep.	Original broadcast date	Average audience share (Nielsen Korea)	
Ep.	Original broadcast date	Nationwide	Seoul
1	January 18, 2023	1.037% (14th)	1.299% (6th)
2	January 19, 2023	1.107% (8th)	1.311% (5th)
3	January 25, 2023	1.107% (21st)	1.331% (9th)
4	January 26, 2023	1.438% (8th)	1.762% (3rd)
5	February 1, 2023	1.212% (7th)	1.379% (6th)
6	February 2, 2023	1.520% (4th)	2.045% (4th)
7	February 8, 2023	1.395% (7th)	1.862% (5th)
8	February 9, 2023	1.691% (4th)	2.176% (3rd)
9	February 15, 2023	1.317% (6th)	1.789% (5th)
10	February 16, 2023	1.542% (4th)	2.013% (4th)
11	February 22, 2023	1.296% (7th)	1.874% (5th)
12	February 23, 2023	1.762% (2nd)	2.198% (2nd)
Average		1.368%	1.753%
In the table above, the blue numbers represent the lowest published ratings and the red numbers represent the highest published ratings.; This series aired on a cable channel/pay TV which normally has a relatively smaller audience compared to free-to-air TV/public broadcasters (KBS, SBS, MBC and EBS).
