= As You Stood By =

2025 South Korean Netflix series

- Promotional poster
- Hangul: 당신이 죽였다
- Lit.: You Killed Him
- RR: Dangsini jugyeotda
- MR: Tangsini chugyŏtta
- Genre: Crime thriller
- Based on: Naomi and Kanako by Hideo Okuda
- Written by: Kim Hyo-jeong
- Directed by: Lee Jeong-rim
- Starring: Jeon So-nee; Lee Yoo-mi; Jang Seung-jo; Lee Moo-saeng
- Music by: Primary
- Country of origin: South Korea
- Original language: Korean
- No. of episodes: 8

Production
- Running time: 56–71 minutes
- Production companies: Studio S; Ghost Studio; Mizi Film

Original release
- Network: Netflix
- Release: November 7, 2025

As You Stood By (Korean: 당신이 죽였다) is a 2025 South Korean crime thriller television series written by Kim Hyo-jeong, directed by Lee Jeong-rim, and starring Jeon So-nee, Lee Yoo-mi, Jang Seung-jo, and Lee Moo-saeng. Based on the 2014 Japanese novel Naomi and Kanako by Hideo Okuda.

The first two episodes of the series premiered at the 30th Busan International Film Festival on the 'On Screen' section in September 18, 2025. It became available on Netflix to stream on November 7, 2025.

== Synopsis ==
The series follows two women who, trapped in a brutal reality where survival demands either killing or being killed, choose to kill, but soon find themselves caught in a twist of fate they never saw coming.

== Cast and characters ==
=== Main ===
- Jeon So-nee as Jo Eun-su
  - Cha Jun-hee as young Eun-su

A VIP department store employee.

- Lee Yoo-mi as Jo Hui-su

An aspiring children's book writer.

- Jang Seung-jo as Noh Jin-pyo / Jang Kang
1. Noh Jin-pyo: Hui-su's husband.
2. Jang Kang: An illegal worker.
- Lee Moo-saeng as Jin So-baek

Owner of the Jinkang Store.

=== Supporting ===
Noh Jin-pyo's family

- Lee Ho-jung as Noh Jin-young

A detective and Jin-pyo's younger sister.

- Kim Mi-sook as Ko Jeong-suk

Jin-pyo and Jin-young's mother and Huisu's mother-in-law, who knew about the abuse she had been subjected to all along.

==== Jo Eun-su's family ====
- Kim Mi-kyung as Park Gye-soon

Eun-su's mother.

- Kim Won-hae as Jo Jung-nam

Eun-soo's father who has been abusing her mother since she was a child.

- Lee Hyun-jun as Jo Eun-hyeok
  - Choi Su-ho as young Eun-hyeok

Eun-su's younger brother.

VIP Customers Group

- Seo Jeong-yeon as Kim Mi-Gyeong An aspiring artist who is a very important investor to Noh Jin-pyo as well one of Eun-soo's best customers.

== Episodes ==
| No. | Title | Directed by | Written by | Original release date |
|---|---|---|---|---|
| 1 | "Eun-su"; Transliteration: "Eunsu" (Korean: 은수) | Lee Jeong-lim | Kim Hyo-jeong | November 7, 2025 |
| 2 | "Hui-su"; Transliteration: "Huisu" (Korean: 희수) | Lee Jeong-lim | Kim Hyo-jeong | November 7, 2025 |
| 3 | "Eun-su, Hui-su and Jin-pyo"; Transliteration: "Eunsuwa huisu geurigo jinpyo" (Korean: 은수와 희수 그리고 진표) | Lee Jeong-lim | Kim Hyo-jeong | November 7, 2025 |
| 4 | "Eun-su and Hui-su"; Transliteration: "Eunsuwa huisu" (Korean: 은수와 희수) | Lee Jeong-lim | Kim Hyo-jeong | November 7, 2025 |
| 5 | "Eun-su and Hui-su and Jin So-baek"; Transliteration: "Eunsuwa huisu geurigo jinsobaek" (Korean: 은수와 희수 그리고 진소백) | Lee Jeong-lim | Kim Hyo-jeong | November 7, 2025 |
| 6 | "Eun-su, Hui-su and Jang Kang"; Transliteration: "Eunsuwa huisu geurigo janggang" (Korean: 은수와 희수 그리고 장강) | Lee Jeong-lim | Kim Hyo-jeong | November 7, 2025 |
| 7 | "Eun-su, Hui-su and Jin-young"; Transliteration: "Eunsuwa huisu geurigo jinyeong" (Korean: 은수와 희수 그리고 진영) | Lee Jeong-lim | Kim Hyo-jeong | November 7, 2025 |
| 8 | "Eun-su, Hui-su and Us"; Transliteration: "Eunsuwa huisu geurigo urideul" (Korean: 은수와 희수 그리고 우리들) | Lee Jeong-lim | Kim Hyo-jeong | November 7, 2025 |

== Production ==
On September 18, 2024 Netflix confirmed the production of the series based on Hideo Okuda's 2014 novel Naomi and Kanako. The main cast of the series, Jeon So-nee, Lee Yu-mi, Jang Seung-jo, and Lee Moo-saeng was confirmed as they participated in script reading, reported on September 19, 2024.

Lee Ho-jung joined the cast as detective Noh Jin-young.

In January 2025, it was reported that Ghost Studios would co-produce the series.

== Release ==
The first two episodes of the series premiered at the 30th Busan International Film Festival in the 'On Screen' section on September 18, 2025.

On September 5, 2025, Netflix revealed the first trailer, and it released on November 7, 2025.

== Reception ==
=== Critical response ===
On the review aggregator website Rotten Tomatoes, 71% of 7 critics' reviews are positive, with an average rating of 6.2/10.

=== Accolades ===
| Award ceremony | Year | Category | Recipient(s) | Result | Ref. |
|---|---|---|---|---|---|
| Baeksang Arts Awards | 2026 | Best Supporting Actor | Jang Seung-jo | Nominated | |
