= Familiar Wife =

2018 South Korean television series

- Promotional poster
- Also known as: Wife That I Know; Wife I Know
- Hangul: 아는 와이프
- Lit.: Knowing Wife
- RR: Aneun waipeu
- MR: Anŭn waip'ŭ
- Genre: Romance; Fantasy; Drama; Comedy
- Created by: Studio Dragon
- Written by: Yang Hee-sung
- Directed by: Lee Sang-yeob
- Starring: Ji Sung; Han Ji-min; Jang Seung-jo; Kang Han-na
- Country of origin: South Korea
- Original language: Korean
- No. of episodes: 16

Production
- Executive producers: Cho Hyung-jin; Kim Sang-heon
- Camera setup: Single-camera
- Production company: Chorokbaem Media

Original release
- Network: tvN
- Release: August 1 – September 20, 2018

Familiar Wife (Korean: 아는 와이프; RR: Aneun waipeu) is a romantic fantasy South Korean television series starring Ji Sung, Han Ji-min, Jang Seung-jo, and Kang Han-na. It aired on tvN from August 1 to September 20, 2018.

== Synopsis ==
A married couple suddenly finds themselves living entirely different lives after their fates magically change through an unexpected incident.

Cha Joo-hyuk works at a bank and has been married to Seo Woo-jin for five years. When a strange incident happens one day, Joo-hyuk makes a decision that impacts his life and those around him in unexpected ways. Suddenly, the life he had with Woo-jin and his best friend, Yoon Joong-hoo are gone and he is leading a very different life.

How will his first love, Lee Hye-won, factor into his new life? And will it be possible to get his old life back?

== Cast ==
=== Main ===
- Ji Sung as Cha Joo-hyuk

An ordinary bank employee that becomes unhappy with his life because of his family's financial struggle and constant pressure by both his wife at home and his direct superior at office.

- Han Ji-min as Seo Woo-jin

A married woman who tries her best to balance between career and family life. She has been married to Joo-hyuk for five years. During those years, she developed anger issues and easily gets agitated with her husband's simple mistakes.

- Jang Seung-jo as Yoon Joong-hoo

Joo-hyuk's best friend who is also an ordinary bank employee with a handsome face. His life is changed completely along with Joo-hyuk due to an unexpected incident.

- Kang Han-na as Lee Hye-won

Cha Joo-hyuk's first love but due to an incident with Woo-jin, both of them became separated. She is a daughter of an influential businessman and also a cello player.

=== Supporting ===
==== People around Cha Joo-hyuk ====
- Park Hee-von as Cha Joo-eun, Joo-hyuk's sister who tries to pass a bar examination
- Oh Eui-shik as Oh Sang-sik, Joo-hyuk's friend who owns a noodle shop and works there alone

==== People around Seo Woo-jin ====
- Lee Jung-eun as Woo-jin's mother with severe Alzheimer's disease. Woo-jin decided to put her in a nursing home because of her worsening situation.

==== Bank employees ====
- Son Jong-hak as Cha Bong-hee, Branch manager of the bank where Joo-hyuk works at. He is kind toward the employees of the branch, especially to Joo-hyuk because of their same surname.
- Park Won-sang as Byeon Sung-woo. Joo-hyuk's direct superior in the branch's loan department. Unlike Bong-hee, he consistently pressurizes his subordinates, especially Joo-hyuk.
- Cha Hak-yeon as Kim Hwan, New recruit at the branch and being assigned as Joo-hyuk's subordinate. He is seen slacking around and making mistakes, becomes a further burden to Joo-hyuk's office life.
- Kim Soo-jin as Jang Man-ok The supervisor of transfer department of the branch.
- Kim So-ra as Joo Hyang-sook. Bank teller on the deposit team.
- Gong Min-jeung as Choi Hye-jung. Bank teller on the deposit team.
- Kang Hui as Jung Min-soo, a security guard who is mostly seen handling rude customers

==== Special appearances ====
- Lee You-jin as Jung Hyun-soo
- Kang Ki-young as Park Yoo-sik. Bank customer (ep. 13)
- Jo Jung-suk as chef Kang Sun-woo (ep. 15)

== Production ==
The first script reading was held on May 9, 2018 at the conference room of Studio Dragon's main office at the 17th floor of DDMC Building in Sangam-dong, Seoul, South Korea.

== Original soundtrack ==
Familiar Wife OST

Soundtrack album by Various Artists
- Released: 2018
- Genre: Soundtrack
- Language: Korean
- Label: Stone Music Entertainment

=== Part 1 ===
Released on August 9, 2018
No.	Title	Lyrics	Music	Artist	Length
1.	"Love Me Again"	Ji Pyeong-kwon, Taibian	Ji Pyeong-kwon, Taibian	SF9	03:16
2.	"Love Me Again (Inst.)"		Ji Pyeong-kwon, Taibian		03:16
Total length:					06:32

=== Part 2 ===
Released on August 16, 2018
No.	Title	Lyrics	Music	Artist	Length
1.	"Let Me Stay"	Lee Jong-won, Ji Pyeong-kwon	Yeom Seung-jae, Ji Pyeong-kwon	John Park	02:51
2.	"Let Me Stay (Inst.)"		Yeom Seung-jae, Ji Pyeong-kwon		02:51
Total length:					05:42

=== Part 3 ===
Released on August 23, 2018
No.	Title	Lyrics	Music	Artist	Length
1.	"No Longer Mine" (왜 몰랐을까)	Dingo	Dingo	Roy Kim	03:36
2.	"No Longer Mine (Inst.)"		Dingo		03:36
Total length:					07:12

=== Part 4 ===
Released on September 6, 2018
No.	Title	Lyrics	Music	Artist	Length
1.	"Let Me Show You"	Cho Michelle	Damon Sharpe, Rob Persaud, Adam Argyle, Cho Michelle	N.Flying	03:06
2.	"Let Me Show You (Inst.)"		Damon Sharpe, Rob Persaud, Adam Argyle, Cho Michelle		03:06
Total length:					06:12

=== Part 5 ===
Released on September 13, 2018
No.	Title	Lyrics	Music	Artist	Length
1.	"You In My Dream" (꿈 속의 너)	Lee Jong-won, Namoo	Ji Pyeong-kwon	Damsonegongbang	03:01
2.	"You In My Dream (Inst.)"		Ji Pyeong-kwon		03:01
Total length:					06:02

=== Part 6 ===
Released on September 20, 2018
No.	Title	Lyrics	Music	Artist	Length
1.	"Hello"	Park Woo-sang	Park Woo-sang	U Sung-eun	03:20
2.	"Hello (Inst.)"		Park Woo-sang		03:20
Total length:					06:40

Disc 2:
No.	Title	Artist	Length
1.	"Between us"	Various Artists	2:40
2.	"Eternally"	Various Artists	2:24
3.	"IF"	Various Artists	2:22
4.	"Memories"	Various Artists	2:14
5.	"Morning Walk"	Various Artists	2:54
6.	"One fine day"	Various Artists	2:57
7.	"The Beginning"	Various Artists	2:10
8.	"Time to remember"	Various Artists	2:23

== Viewership ==
Familiar Wife : South Korea viewers per episode (millions)

Season	Episode number																Average
Season	1	2	3	4	5	6	7	8	9	10	11	12	13	14	15	16	Average
1	1.254	1.501	1.206	1.556	1.690	1.788	1.776	1.685	1.760	2.039	1.592	1.929	1.776	1.944	1.585	1.781	1.679

Source: Audience measurement performed nationwide by Nielsen Media Research.

Average TV viewership ratings
Ep.	Original broadcast date	Average audience share (AGB Nielsen)	
Ep.	Original broadcast date	Nationwide	Seoul
1	August 1, 2018	4.680% (1st)	4.910% (1st)
2	August 2, 2018	5.535% (1st)	6.548% (1st)
3	August 8, 2018	5.104% (1st)	6.160% (1st)
4	August 9, 2018	6.209% (1st)	7.523% (1st)
5	August 15, 2018	6.621% (1st)	7.774% (1st)
6	August 16, 2018	7.259% (1st)	8.594% (1st)
7	August 22, 2018	6.506% (1st)	7.445% (1st)
8	August 23, 2018	6.950% (1st)	7.847% (1st)
9	August 29, 2018	6.879% (1st)	7.892% (1st)
10	August 30, 2018	8.210% (1st)	9.741% (1st)
11	September 5, 2018	7.096% (1st)	8.422% (1st)
12	September 6, 2018	8.106% (1st)	9.636% (1st)
13	September 12, 2018	7.449% (1st)	9.121% (1st)
14	September 13, 2018	7.875% (1st)	9.369% (1st)
15	September 19, 2018	6.709% (1st)	7.831% (1st)
16	September 20, 2018	7.870% (1st)	8.937% (1st)
Average		6.816%	7.984%
The blue numbers represent the lowest ratings and the red numbers represent the highest ratings.; This drama aired on a cable channel/pay TV which normally has a relatively smaller audience compared to free-to-air TV/public broadcasters (KBS, SBS, MBC and EBS).

== Awards and nominations ==
Year	Award	Category	Recipient	Result	Ref.
2018	11th Korea Drama Awards	Best Original Soundtrack	"No Longer Mine" (Roy Kim)	Nominated	
