= Lee Yoo-mi =

South Korean actress (born 1994)

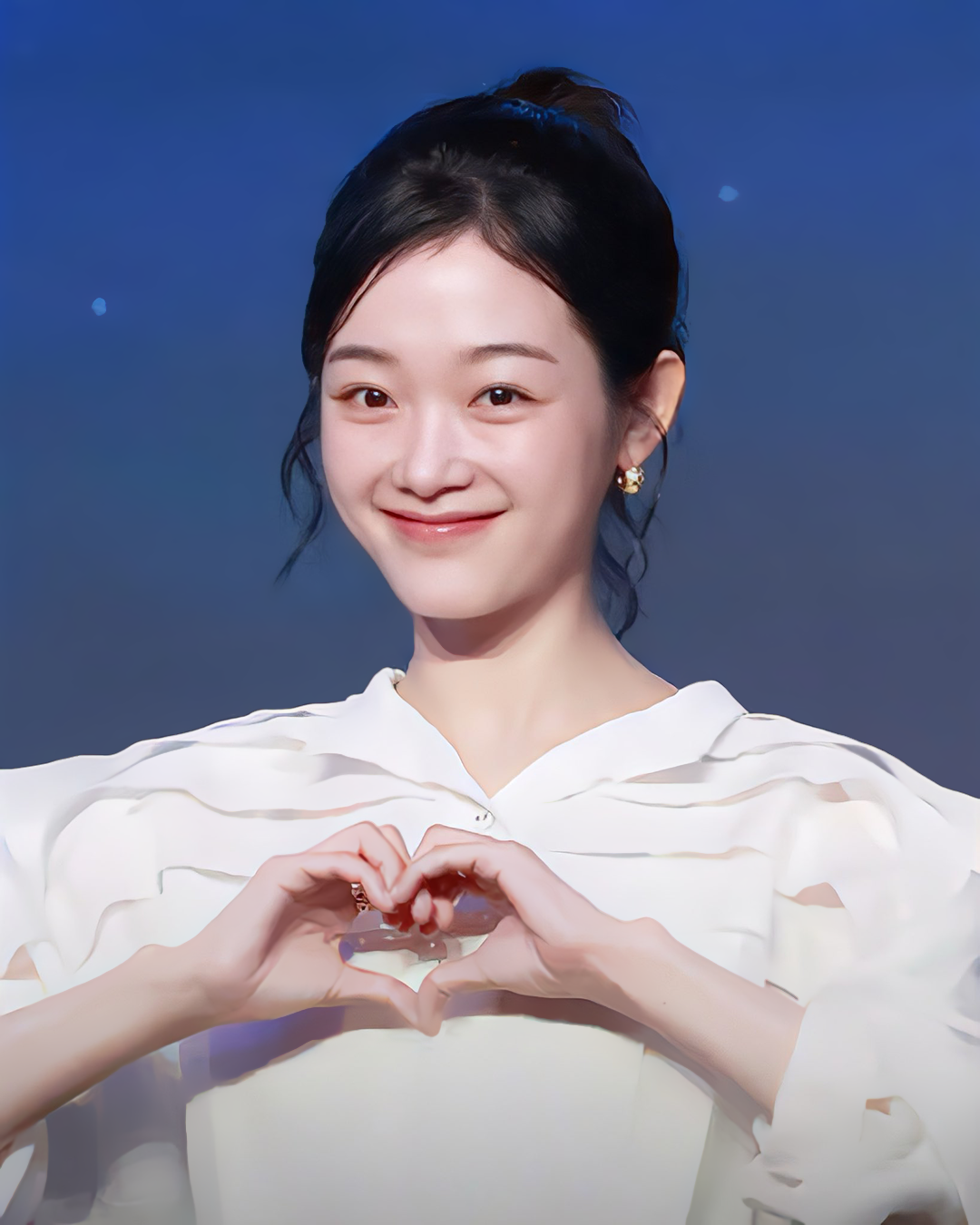
- Lee in November 2024
- Born: July 18, 1994 (age 32); Jeonju, South Korea
- Occupation: Actress
- Years active: 2010–present
- Agent: Varo Entertainment

Korean name
- Hangul: 이유미
- RR: I Yumi
- MR: I Yumi

Lee Yoo-mi (Korean: 이유미; born July 18, 1994) is a South Korean actress. She is known for her roles as Ji-yeong / Player 240 in Squid Game (2021), Lee Na-yeon in All of Us Are Dead (2022), Gang Nam-soon in Strong Girl Nam-soon (2023), Jo Jae-mi in Mr. Plankton (2024), and Jo Hui-su in As You Stood By (2025). She won the Primetime Emmy Award for Outstanding Guest Actress in a Drama Series for her role as Ji-yeong in Squid Game, making her the first Korean actress to win in the category.

== Early life ==
Lee was born on July 18, 1994, in Jeonju, South Korea.

== Career ==
She began her acting career in 2010 with her debut in the action thriller The Yellow Sea. In the following years, her work was limited to minor roles in several film and television series.

On September 28, 2020, it was announced that Lee had signed an exclusive contract with Varo Entertainment.

In 2021, Lee rose to prominence outside South Korea for her role as Ji-yeong (Number 240) in the Netflix series Squid Game. Following the series' international success, Lee's follower count on Instagram increased from 40,000 to over 6.5 million in a matter of days. Her performance made her the first Korean actress to win the Primetime Emmy Award for Outstanding Guest Actress in a Drama Series.

In 2022, Lee starred as Lee Na-yeon in the Netflix zombie-themed series All of Us Are Dead. Her performance as the villainous, selfish, arrogant, and rich student (which contrasted with the understandable and selfless Ji-yeong in Squid Game) further elevated her profile.

In 2023, Lee starred in the South Korean TV series, Strong Girl Nam-soon, as the titular character, Gang Nam-soon, a young woman with superhuman strength passed down to her through her maternal line. The series aired on JTBC and is available on Netflix.

In 2025, she starred as Jo Hui-su a once-aspiring children’s book writer in the Netflix crime thriller television series As You Stood By.

== Philanthropy ==
On July 20, 2022, Lee donated cosmetic products worth ₩3 million to a public foundation for burn patients.

== Filmography ==
=== Film ===
Year	Title	Role	Ref.
2010	The Yellow Sea	Kim Tae-won's daughter	
2012	Grape Candy	Seon Joo (young)	
2013	The Russian Novel	Yoo Mi	
2013	Hwayi: A Monster Boy	Yoo Kyung's friend	
2013	Rough Play	Advertisement Girl	
2015	The Avian Kind	So-nyeo	
2016	Like a French Film	Su-bin	
2016	Will You Be There?	Yeon-ah	
2017	Superpower Girl	Maeng Ju-ri	
2017	The Heartbeat Operator	Hye Eun	
2018	Never Ever Rush	Hana	
2018	Outdoor Begins	Ma-ri	
2018	The Whispering	Byun Ji-eun	
2018	Park Hwa Young	Se Jin	
2021	Young Adult Matters	Yoon Se-jin	
2021	Hostage: Missing Celebrity	Ban So-yeon	
2022	Today's Superpower	Ji-woo	
2023	New Normal	Hyun-soo	
TBA	Rain Angel	Ye-ji	

=== Television series ===
Year	Title	Role	Notes	Ref.
2010	Future Boy	Seo Yeon-doo		
2015	Cheo Yong 2	Song Da-jung	Cameo (Episode 6)	
2017	Children of the 20th Century	Mi Dal / Jo Min-hyun		
2018	Voice 2	Hwang Hee-joo	Cameo (Episode 3)	
2018	Just Dance	Kim Do-yeon		
2019	Doctor John	Na Kyung-ah		
2020	Drama Stage – "Everyone is There"	Lee Gyu-jin	One-act drama	
2020	365: Repeat the Year	Kim Se-rin		
2022	Mental Coach Jegal	Cha Ga-eul		
2022	If You Wish Upon Me	Young woman	Cameo (Episode 16)	
2023	Strong Girl Nam-soon	Gang Nam-soon		

=== Web series ===
Year	Title	Role	Notes	Ref.
2018	A Trivial Afternoon in the City	Sin Na-ra	Bit part	
2018	It's Okay To Be Sensitive	Ye-ji	Studio OnStyle original	
2021	Squid Game	Ji-yeong (Player No. 240)	Netflix; Season 1	
2022	All of Us Are Dead	Lee Na-yeon	Netflix	
2024	Mr. Plankton	Jo Jae-mi	Netflix	
2025	As You Stood By	Jo Hui-su	Netflix	

=== Music video appearances ===
Year	Song title	Artist	Ref.
2023	"Yesterday"	Jay Park	
2026	"Blue"	DK X Seungkwan	

== Accolades ==
=== Awards and nominations ===
Name of the award ceremony, year presented, category, nominee of the award, and the result of the nomination
Award ceremony	Year	Category	Nominee / Work	Result	Ref.
APAN Star Awards	2022	Excellence Award, Actress in an OTT Drama	Squid Game; All of Us Are Dead	Nominated	
Blue Dragon Film Awards	2021	Best New Actress	Young Adult Matters	Nominated	
Baeksang Arts Awards	2022	Best New Actress – Film	Young Adult Matters	Won	
Baeksang Arts Awards	2022	Best New Actress – Television	All of Us Are Dead	Nominated	
Buil Film Awards	2021	Best New Actress	Young Adult Matters	Won	
Cine21 Film Awards	2021	Best New Actress	Hostage: Missing Celebrity; Young Adult Matters	Won	
Gold Derby Awards	2022	Best Drama Guest Actress	Squid Game	Won	
Kinolights Awards	2021	Actress of the Year (Domestic)	Squid Game; Hostage: Missing Celebrity; Young Adult Matters	4th	
Korean Film Writers Association Awards	2021	Best New Actress	Hostage: Missing Celebrity; Young Adult Matters	Won	
Primetime Creative Arts Emmy Awards	2022	Outstanding Guest Actress in a Drama Series	Squid Game	Won	

=== Listicles ===
Name of publisher, year listed, name of listicle, and placement
Publisher	Year	Listicle	Placement	Ref.
Time	2022	Next Generation Leaders	Placed	

== See also ==
- List of Primetime Emmy Award winners
