= Encounter (South Korean TV series) =

2018 South Korean television series

- Promotional poster
- Hangul: 남자친구
- Hanja: 男子親舊
- Lit.: Boyfriend
- RR: Namjachingu
- MR: Namjach'in'gu
- Genre: Melodrama; Romance
- Created by: Studio Dragon
- Written by: Yoo Young-ah
- Directed by: Park Shin-woo
- Starring: Song Hye-kyo; Park Bo-gum
- Music by: Nam Hye-seung
- Country of origin: South Korea
- Original language: Korean
- No. of episodes: 16

Production
- Producers: Moon Seok-hwan; Oh Kwang-hee
- Production locations: Seoul, South Korea; Havana, Cuba
- Production company: Bon Factory Worldwide

Original release
- Network: tvN
- Release: November 28, 2018 – January 24, 2019

Encounter (Korean: 남자친구; RR: Namjachingu) is a 2018 South Korean television series directed by Park Shin-woo starring Song Hye-kyo and Park Bo-gum. The series revolves around a woman who seems to have everything and a young man who seems to have nothing giving up their way of lives to be together. It aired on tvN from November 28, 2018 to January 24, 2019 every Wednesday and Thursday at 21:30 (KST) for 16 episodes. It is one of the highest-rated Korean dramas in cable television history.

A commercial success, Encounter's broadcasting rights were sold to over 100 territories outside South Korea for television airing and streaming. A Philippine remake of the same name aired on TV5 in 2021.

== Synopsis ==
Cha Soo-hyun (Song Hye-kyo), daughter of a politician, lives a pathetic life guided by others. She married into a chaebol only to divorce her husband because of his affair. While on a business trip in Cuba, she fatefully meets and spends time with Kim Jin-hyuk (Park Bo-gum), a free-spirited guy traveling alone. After going back to South Korea separately, Jin-hyuk meets Soo-hyun again but as an employee of Donghwa Hotel which Soo-hyun is the CEO of.

== Cast ==
=== Main ===
- Song Hye-kyo as Cha Soo-hyun

A daughter of a prominent politician and former daughter-in-law of a wealthy family

- Park Bo-gum as Kim Jin-hyuk

A freewheeling, ordinary young man who finds joy in the simplest things

=== Supporting ===
==== People around Soo-hyun ====
- Jang Seung-jo as Jung Woo-seok, Soo-hyun's ex-husband
- Moon Sung-keun as Cha Jong-hyun, Soo-hyun's father
- Nam Gi-ae as Jin Mi-ock, Soo-hyun's mother
- Ko Chang-seok as Nam Myeong-sik, Soo-hyun's driver
- Kwak Sun-young as Jang Mi-jin

Soo-hyun's secretary

- Cha Hwa-yeon as Chairman Kim Hwa-jin, Woo-seok's mother

==== People around Jin-hyuk ====
- Shin Jung-geun as Kim Jang-soo, Jin-hyuk's father
- Baek Ji-won as Joo Yeon-ja, Jin-hyuk's mother
- Pyo Ji-hoon as Kim Jin-myung, Jin-hyuk's younger brother
- Kim Joo-hun as Lee Dae-chan, Jin-hyuk's friend who opens a restaurant
- Gil Hae-yeon as Ms. Lee, a teacher

==== Donghwa Hotel ====
- Kim Hye-eun as Kim Sun-joo, Jin-hyuk's PR department leader at work
- Jeon So-nee as Jo Hye-in, Jin-hyuk's friend and senior at work
- Kim Ho-chang as Lee Jin-ho, Jin-hyuk's workmate
- Lee Si-hoon as Park Han-gil, Jin-hyuk's workmate
- Park Jin-joo as Eun-jin, Jin-hyuk's workmate who has an interest in him
- Park Sung-geun as Choi Jin-cheul
- Shin Soo-yeon as Ji-yoo, Sun-joo's daughter

== Production ==
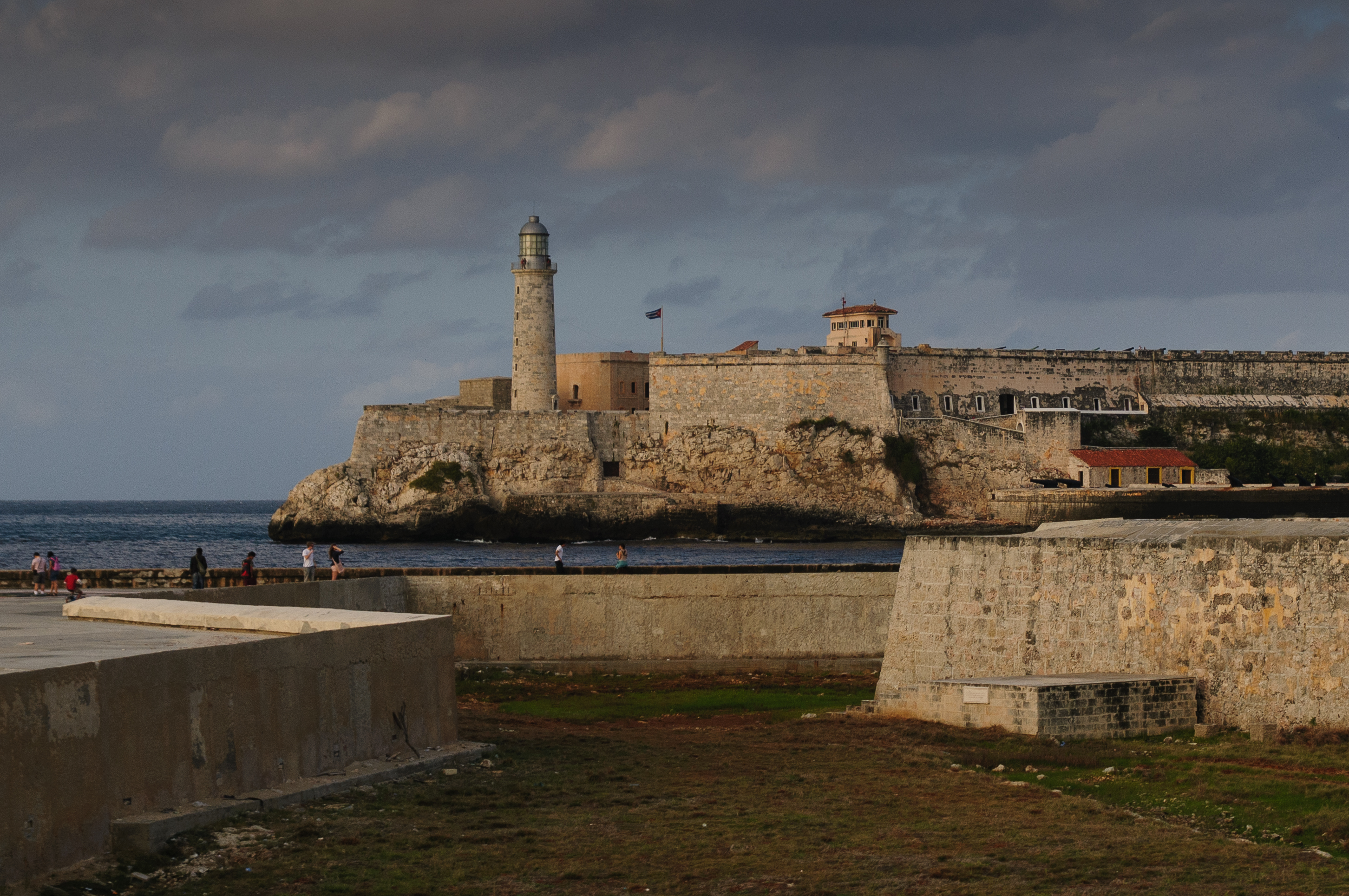
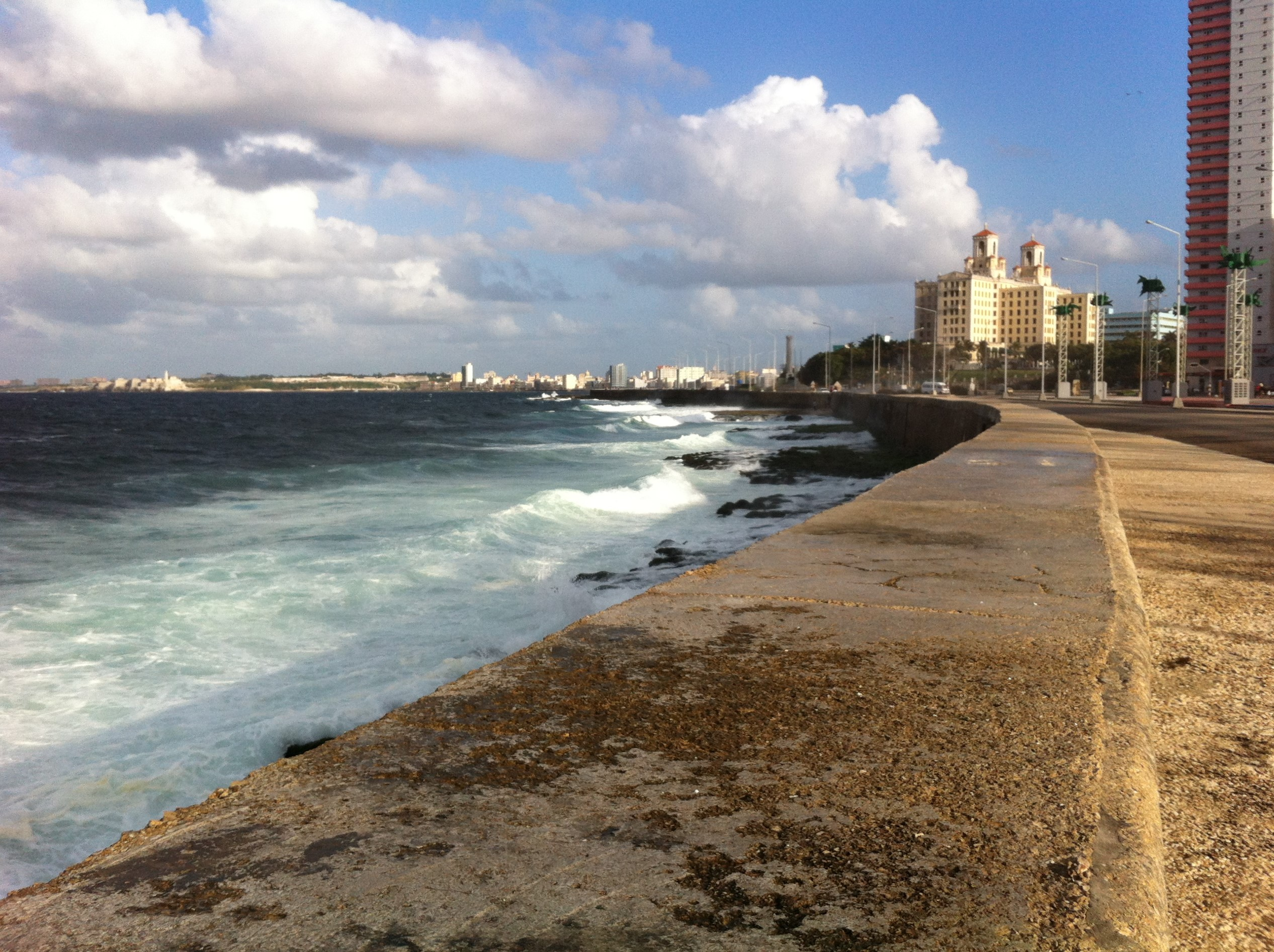
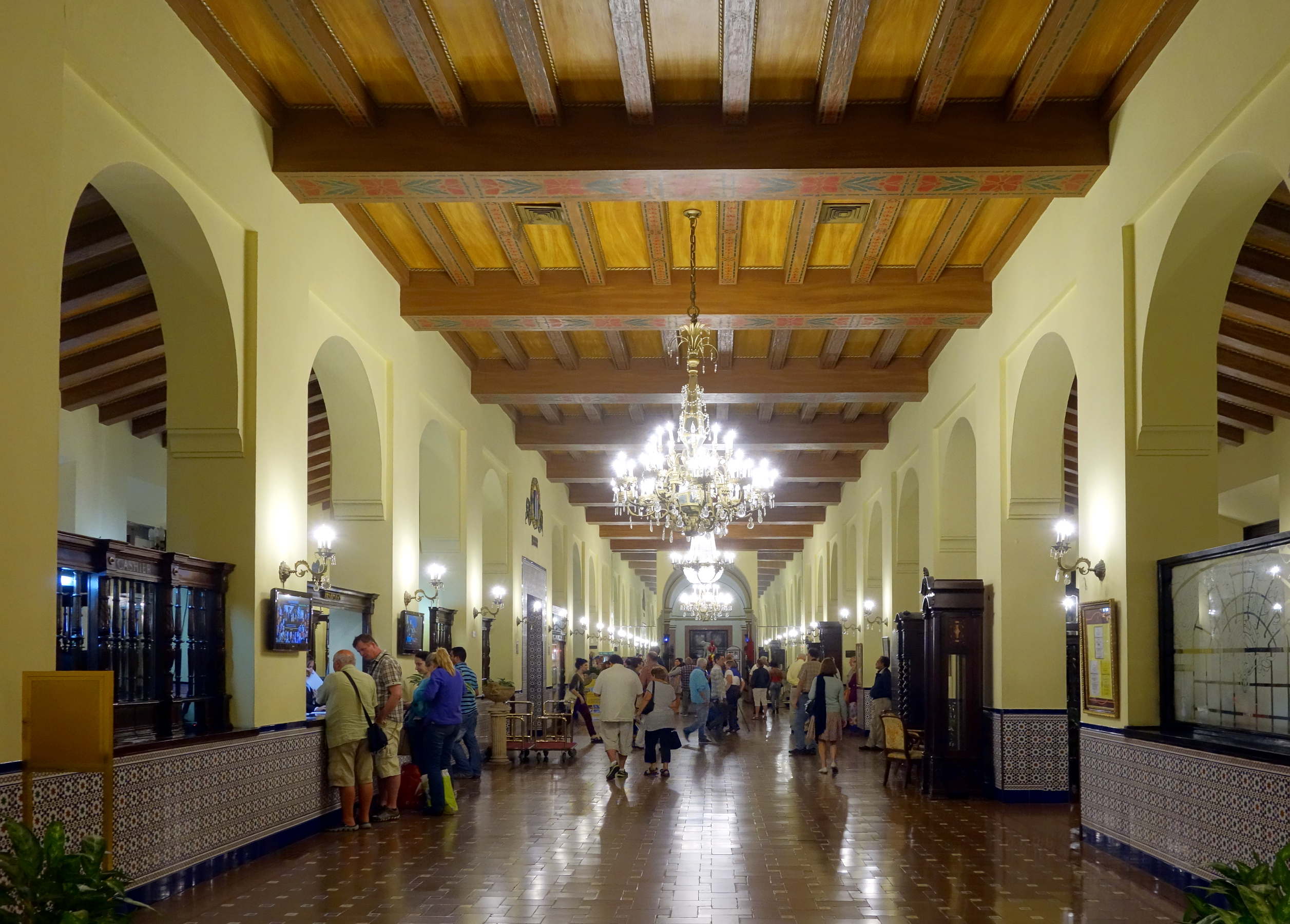
Clockwise from top: Filming locations in Cuba included Castillo de los Tres Reyes Del Morro, Hotel Nacional de Cuba, and Avenida Malecón

=== Casting ===
In July 2018, Song Hye-kyo and Park Bo-gum were confirmed to star in the drama for TvN. Per KBS News, their casting had generated significant buzz as Song is one of South Korea's top melodrama actresses and Park has "captivated the nation with 'Bo-gum Fever'". The series was written by Yoo Young-ah and produced by Bon Factory. The first script reading was held on August 23, 2018.

In a press conference in November 2018, director Park Shin-woo stated that he first thought of Song and Park – despite the actors' 12-year age gap – when he read the script, stating: "I never considered any other actors. I am truly fortunate and honored to be working with them." The director added that the series offers "TV audiences a time to sit back and relax while reflecting on their own experiences of falling in love and connecting with the characters."

=== Filming ===
Principal photography began in September 2018. The series is the first Korean drama filmed in Cuba and the production spent approximately a month of filming in Havana's Castillo de los Tres Reyes Del Morro, Hotel Nacional de Cuba, and Avenida Malecón.

== Release ==
The series aired on tvN from November 28, 2018 to January 24, 2019 every Wednesday and Thursday at 21:30 (KST) for 16 episodes.

== Episodes ==
No. in series	Title	Directed by	Written by	Original release date
1	"Enchanted"	Park Shin-woo	Yoo Young-ah	November 28, 2018
2	"We Sincerely Welcome You"	Park Shin-woo	Yoo Young-ah	November 29, 2018
3	"Yearning"	Park Shin-woo	Yoo Young-ah	December 5, 2018
4	"That's Why I'm Trying to Stop"	Park Shin-woo	Yoo Young-ah	December 6, 2018
5	"I'm Good at Holding Back"	Park Shin-woo	Yoo Young-ah	December 12, 2018
6	"It's Already Spring for Us"	Park Shin-woo	Yoo Young-ah	December 13, 2018
7	"Sudden Personal Appointment"	Park Shin-woo	Yoo Young-ah	December 19, 2018
8	"Party Must Go On"	Park Shin-woo	Yoo Young-ah	December 20, 2018
9	"Don't Be Afraid"	Park Shin-woo	Yoo Young-ah	January 2, 2019
10	"It Proves That I Was the First I Like You"	Park Shin-woo	Yoo Young-ah	January 3, 2019
11	"My Heart Is Full of You"	Park Shin-woo	Yoo Young-ah	January 9, 2019
12	"I Cherish You Very Much"	Park Shin-woo	Yoo Young-ah	January 10, 2019
13	"I Can No Longer Live Without You"	Park Shin-woo	Yoo Young-ah	January 16, 2019
14	"It's Your First Love Too"	Park Shin-woo	Yoo Young-ah	January 17, 2019
15	"I'm Sorry"	Park Shin-woo	Yoo Young-ah	January 23, 2019
16	"I'll Wait in My Place"	Park Shin-woo	Yoo Young-ah	January 24, 2019

== Original soundtrack ==
Encounter Original Television Soundtrack

Soundtrack album by Various artists
- Released: January 25, 2019
- Genre: Soundtrack
- Languages: Korean; English
- Labels: Genie Music, Stone Music Entertainment

=== Part 1 ===
Released on November 29, 2018
No.	Title	Lyrics	Music	Artist	Length
1.	"The Day We Met" (영화 같던 날)	Nam Hye-seung, Park Jin-ho	Nam Hye-seung, Park Jin-ho	Cheeze	03:56
2.	"The Day We Met" (Inst.)		Nam Hye-seung, Park Jin-ho		03:56
Total length:					07:52

=== Part 2 ===
Released on December 6, 2018
No.	Title	Lyrics	Music	Artist	Length
1.	"Into My Heart" (그대가 이렇게 내 맘에)	Hen	Hen	Lee So-ra	03:21
2.	"Into My Heart" (Inst.)		Hen		03:21
Total length:					06:42

=== Part 3 ===
Released on December 13, 2018
No.	Title	Lyrics	Music	Artist	Length
1.	"Don't Hesitate" (망설이지 마요)	Nam Hye-seung, Park Jin-ho	Nam Hye-seung, Park Jin-ho	Yong Jun-hyung (Highlight)	03:35
2.	"Don't Hesitate" (Inst.)		Nam Hye-seung, Park Jin-ho		03:35
Total length:					07:10

=== Part 4 ===
Released on December 20, 2018
No.	Title	Lyrics	Music	Artist	Length
1.	"The Night" (그 밤)	Lee Shin-hyung, d.ear	d.ear	Eric Nam	03:40
2.	"The Night" (Inst.)		d.ear		03:40
Total length:					07:20

=== Part 5 ===
Released on December 26, 2018
No.	Title	Lyrics	Music	Artist	Length
1.	"Flutter" (설렘)	Dong Woo-seok	Dong Woo-seok	O.WHEN	03:54
2.	"Flutter" (Inst.)		Dong Woo-seok		03:54
Total length:					07:48

=== Part 6 ===
Released on January 3, 2019
No.	Title	Lyrics	Music	Artist	Length
1.	"Take Me On" (나를 데려가 라)	Nam Hye-seung, JELLO ANN	Nam Hye-seung, Park Sang-hee	SAya	03:41
2.	"Take Me On" (나를 데려가 라)	Nam Hye-seung, JELLO ANN	Nam Hye-seung, Park Sang-hee	SALTNPAPER	03:41
Total length:					07:22

=== Part 7 ===
Released on January 10, 2019
No.	Title	Lyrics	Music	Artist	Length
1.	"Always Be With You" (그대여야만 해요)	Bily Acoustie	Bily Acoustie	Baek A-yeon	04:41
2.	"Always Be With You my baby" (Inst.)		Bily Acoustie		04:41
Total length:					09:22

=== Part 8 ===
Released on January 17, 2019
No.	Title	Lyrics	Music	Artist	Length
1.	"Fairytale" (동화)	Nam Hye-seung, Park Jin-ho	Nam Hye-seung, Park Jin-ho	Ra.D	05:07
2.	"Fairytale" (Inst.)		Nam Hye-seung, Park Jin-ho		05:07
Total length:					10:14

=== Part 9 ===
Released on January 24, 2019
No.	Title	Lyrics	Music	Artist	Length
1.	"Good Night" (안녕히 주무세요)	Han Jae-wan	Han Jae-wan	Seo Ji-an	03:37
2.	"Good Night" (Inst.)		Han Jae-wan		03:37
Total length:					07:14

Disc 2:
No.	Title	Artist	Length
1.	"Boyfriend (ver.1) (Opening Theme)"	Nam Hye-seung, Park Sang-hee	1:11
2.	"I Never Knew"	Nam Hye-seung, Park Sang-hee	2:56
3.	"Hongje-dong Playground"	Nam Hye-seung, Park Sang-hee	2:13
4.	"Every Breathe"	Nam Hye-seung, Park Sang-hee	4:4
5.	"Road To You"	Nam Hye-seung, Park Sang-hee	3:26
6.	"Love Birds"	Nam Hye-seung, Park Sang-hee	4:19
7.	"The Night Sky of Cuba"	Nam Hye-seung, Park Sang-hee	3:33
8.	"Tomorrow We Meet Again"	Nam Hye-seung, Park Sang-hee	3:08
9.	"The EvenFall"	Nam Hye-seung, Park Sang-hee	4:16

== Reception ==
=== Critical response ===
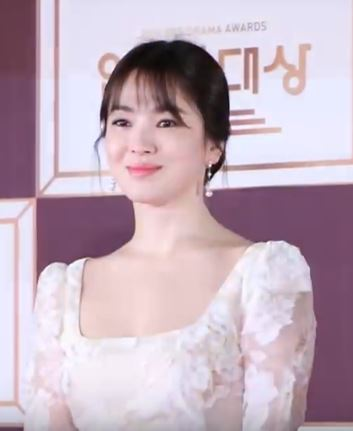
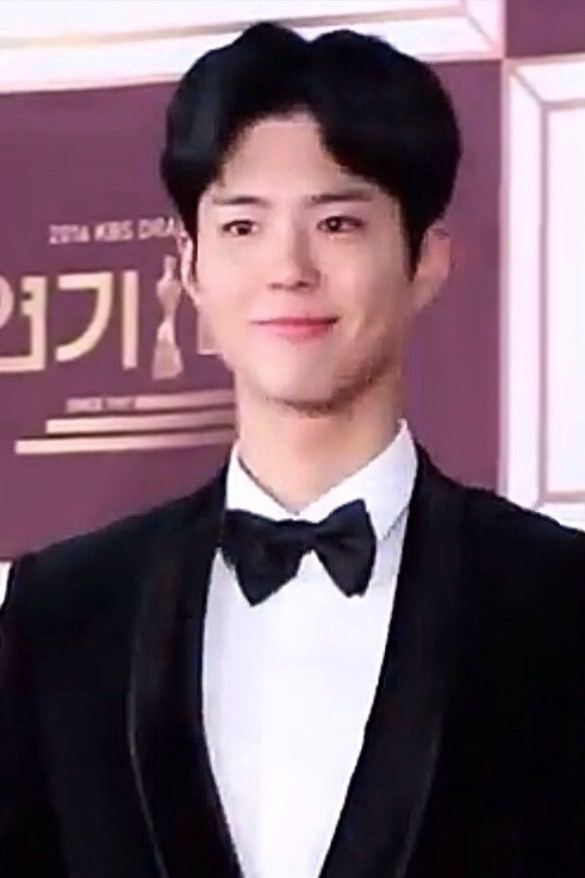
Song Hye-kyo (Soo-hyun) and Park Bo-gum (Jin-hyuk) received praise for their performances

For The Korea Times, Encounter "poignantly portrays the heartbreaking romance" between the lead characters and further added that "Song Hye-kyo and Park Bo-gum are completely absorbed in their roles as Soo-hyun and Jin-hyuk, delicately conveying their emotions through their gazes, facial expressions, gestures, and even their every word". The Indian Express, in their review, described the series as a "slow-burn of an intensely absorbing, healing romance" and called it "one of the most absorbing K-drama romances". For Gulf News, it depicts a "mature love story spoken mostly in silences"; "a quiet show, with strong undercurrents, imbued with themes of love, contemplation, the ability to move beyond one's own reservations and the actual fear of living in the spotlight." Both leads were praised for their performances with Park commended for his delicate portrayal, expressing the gradual changes in the interior life of his character.

=== Impact ===
The big data analytics firm Good Data Corporation reported that Park Bo-gum ranked first in overall topicality making him the "Most Buzzworthy Performer" (TV; Drama and Entertainment) for the drama's entire eight-week run. This resulted to Park being dubbed the "Nation's Boyfriend". He also ranked 4th in the annual Gallup Korea Television Actor of the Year survey in 2018.

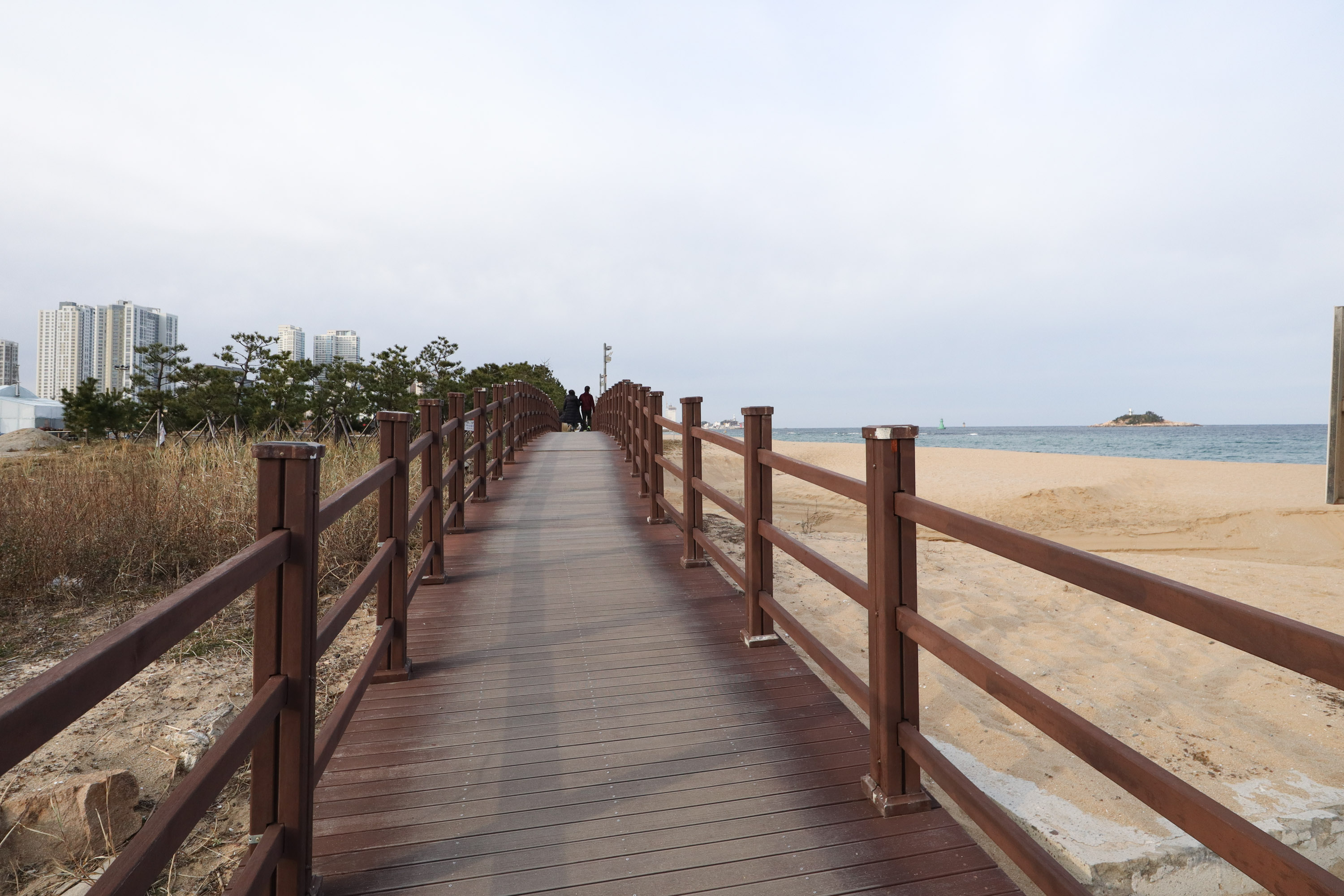
Sokcho's Oeongchi beach has a dedicated Encounter photo zone where leads Song and Park filmed a scene

Song Hye-kyo's wardrobe in the series, from her dresses to shoes and jewelry, were widely discussed and covered by media outlets leading to brands featured selling out stock. Song's bob haircut also made headlines and her character's lip serum stick by Sulwhasoo went viral. Sponsored by Hyundai Motor Company, the series featured the company's flagship SUV, the Palisade, in the third and fourth episodes which aired on December 5–6, 2018, ahead of its official release on December 11, 2018. In addition, Na Tae-joo's poetry collection I See You Like I Look at a Flower, first published in 2015, entered several bestseller lists after featuring in the drama. Filming locations of the series like the reed fields of Gaetgol Ecological Park in Siheung gained heightened interest and became popular among couples. Oeongchi beach in Sokcho has a dedicated photo zone at the bench of the observatory where Song and Park filmed a scene.

The broadcasting rights of the series were sold to several countries outside South Korea. It was also made available for streaming internationally in over 100 territories via Viki in Europe and the Americas, Viu in Southeast Asia, in addition to IQIYI and Netflix. "Many overseas partners had shown a strong interest in the series for the star cast and producer Park Shin-woo's proven production ability" explained Seo Jang-ho, head of the global content department of CJ ENM, on the drama's commercial success.

=== Viewership ===
An 8.7% viewership rating was recorded nationwide for the first episode, making it the fourth-highest premiere rating of the network at the time. It also became one of the highest-rated Korean dramas in cable television history.

Encounter : South Korea viewers per episode (millions)

Season	Episode number																Average
Season	1	2	3	4	5	6	7	8	9	10	11	12	13	14	15	16	Average
1	1.977	2.473	2.175	2.211	2.027	1.895	1.947	2.100	1.878	1.887	1.605	1.745	1.719	1.667	1.772	1.965	1.940

Source: Audience measurement performed nationwide by Nielsen Media Research.

Average TV viewership ratings
Ep.	Original broadcast date	Average audience share		
Ep.	Original broadcast date	AGB Nielsen		TNmS
Ep.	Original broadcast date	Nationwide	Seoul	Nationwide
1	November 28, 2018	8.683% (1st)	11.454% (1st)	9.4%
2	November 29, 2018	10.329% (1st)	12.868% (1st)	11.0%
3	December 5, 2018	9.251% (1st)	11.772% (1st)	10.2%
4	December 6, 2018	9.264% (1st)	11.468% (1st)	9.2%
5	December 12, 2018	8.513% (1st)	10.575% (1st)	10.5%
6	December 13, 2018	8.594% (1st)	10.906% (1st)	8.1%
7	December 19, 2018	8.592% (1st)	10.612% (1st)	8.6%
8	December 20, 2018	9.166% (1st)	11.776% (1st)	7.7%
9	January 2, 2019	7.810% (1st)	9.845% (1st)	7.2%
10	January 3, 2019	7.962% (1st)	9.590% (1st)	7.7%
11	January 9, 2019	7.513% (1st)	9.310% (1st)	7.5%
12	January 10, 2019	7.623% (1st)	9.630% (1st)	7.3%
13	January 16, 2019	7.927% (1st)	10.043% (1st)	8.0%
14	January 17, 2019	7.702% (1st)	9.678% (1st)	7.4%
15	January 23, 2019	7.999% (1st)	10.590% (1st)	7.9%
16	January 24, 2019	8.678% (1st)	11.161% (1st)	7.4%
Average		8.475%	10.705%	8.4%
The blue numbers represent the lowest ratings and the red numbers represent the highest ratings.; This drama aired on a cable channel/pay TV which normally has a relatively smaller audience compared to free-to-air TV/public broadcasters (KBS, SBS, MBC and EBS).

=== Accolades ===
==== Awards and nominations ====
Award	Year	Category	Recipient	Result	Ref.
Baeksang Arts Awards	2019	Most Popular Actor, Television	Park Bo-gum	Nominated	
Soompi Awards	2019	Best Couple Award	Park Bo-gum and Song Hye-kyo	Nominated	

==== Listicles ====
Name of publisher, year listed, name of listicle, recipient, and placement
Publication	Year	List	Placement	Ref.
10mag	2019	Must-Watch Korean Dramas of 2019	7th	

== Remake ==
In 2021, Viva Television and Cignal Entertainment produced a Philippine remake based on Encounter starring Cristine Reyes and Diego Loyzaga. It premiered on March 20, 2021 on TV5. ABS-CBN previously aired the Korean drama, dubbed in Filipino, in August 2019.
