= When My Love Blooms =

2020 South Korean television series

- Promotional poster
- Also known as: The Most Beautiful Moment in Life; Blossom
- Hangul: 화양연화 – 삶이 꽃이 되는 순간
- Lit.: The Most Beautiful Moment in Life – The Moment Life Becomes a Flower
- RR: Hwayangyeonhwa – salmi kkochi doeneun sungan
- MR: Hwayangyŏnhwa – salmi kkoch'i toenŭn sun'gan
- Genre: Melodrama; Romance
- Developed by: Studio Dragon
- Written by: Jeon Hee-young
- Directed by: Son Jung-hyun
- Starring: Yoo Ji-tae; Lee Bo-young; Park Jin-young; Jeon So-nee
- Country of origin: South Korea
- Original language: Korean
- No. of episodes: 16

Production
- Running time: 60 minutes
- Production companies: Studio Dragon; Bon Factory Worldwide

Original release
- Network: tvN
- Release: April 25 – June 14, 2020

When My Love Blooms (Korean: 화양연화 – 삶이 꽃이 되는 순간) is a 2020 South Korean television series starring Yoo Ji-tae, Lee Bo-young, Park Jin-young, and Jeon So-nee. It aired on tvN every Saturday and Sunday at 21:00 (KST) from April 25 to June 14, 2020.

== Synopsis ==
Han Jae-hyun (Yoo Ji-tae) and Yoon Ji-soo (Lee Bo-young) met and fell in love when they were university students. Twenty years later, they cross paths once again: Jae-hyun has become a successful businessman who pursues wealth and honor, while Ji-soo is a mother and a contract worker living a difficult life.

== Cast ==
=== Main ===
- Yoo Ji-tae as Han Jae-hyun
  - Park Jin-young as young Jae-hyun

The vice-president of Hyung Sung Corporation. He is seen as a labor union turncoat when in actuality, he joined Hyung Song Corporation to take revenge on those who betrayed and framed his father for illegal dissolution of labor unions that eventually led to his suicide.

- Lee Bo-young as Yoon Ji-soo
  - Jeon So-nee as young Ji-soo

=== Supporting ===
==== People around Ji-soo ====
- Jang Gwang as Yoon Hyung-gyu

He is Ji-soo's father and a former Chief Prosecutor of the Seoul Central District Prosecutor's Office. He was fired from his job after admitting to abusing his power and taking bribes.

- Lee Jong-nam as Jung Sook-hee

Ji-soo's mother. She died after the department store she was in collapsed. She was in the department store with Ji-young to buy a gift and cake for Ji-soo's birthday.

- Chae Won-bin as Yoon Ji-young

Ji-soo's sister. She died with her mother.

- Go Woo-rim as Lee Young-min

Ji-soo's son. He attends an international school on a scholarship but left on his own accord. He finds custody under his mother more comfortable than his father's.

==== People around Jae-hyun ====
- Moon Sung-keun as Jang San

Jae-hyun's father in law and the President of Hyung Sung Corporation.

- Park Si-yeon as Jang Seo-kyung, Jae-hyun's estranged wife
- Park Min-soo as Han Joon-seo, Jae-hyun's son who bullies Ji'soo's son
- Kang Young-seok as Kang Joon-woo
- Kim Ho-chang as Jung Yoon-gi
- Nam Myung-ryul as Han In-ho, Jae-hyun's father
- Son Sook as Lee Kyung-ja, Jae-hyun's mother

==== Others ====
- Woo Jung-won as Yang Hye-jung
  - Park Han-sol as young Hye-jung
- Lee Tae-sung as Joo Young-woo
  - Byung Hun as young Young-woo
- Min Sung-wook as Lee Dong-jin
  - Eun Hae-sung as young Dong-jin
- Kim Joo-ryoung as Sung Hwa-jin
  - Han Ji-won as young Hwa-jin
- Kim Young-hoon as Lee Se-hoon, Ji-soo's ex-husband
- Choi Woo-hyuk as Se-hwi, Seo-kyung's lover
- Kim Young-ah as Choi Sun-hee

== Original soundtrack ==
When My Love Blooms OST

Soundtrack album by Various artists
- Released: 2020
- Genre: Soundtrack
- Languages: Korean; English
- Labels: Genie Music; Stone Music Entertainment

=== Part 1 ===
Released on April 25, 2020
No.	Title	Artist	Length
1.	"The Season Like You" (너라는 계절은)	Jang Hye-jin	3:56
2.	"The Season Like You" (Inst.)		3:56
Total length:			7:12

=== Part 2 ===
Released on April 26, 2020
No.	Title	Lyrics	Music	Artist	Length
1.	"Fall In Love" (빠져드나봐)	제인스(Jayins), 한재완	제인스(Jayins), 한재완	Choi Young-jae & Choi Jung Yoon	3:23
2.	"Fall In Love" (Inst.)		제인스(Jayins), 한재완		3:23
Total length:					6:46

=== Part 3 ===
Released on May 2, 2020
No.	Title	Artist	Length
1.	"Someday We Will Meet Again" (다시 만날 날이 있겠죠)	KLANG	4:47
2.	"Someday We Will Meet Again" (Inst.)		4:47
Total length:			8:94

=== Part 4 ===
Released on May 3, 2020
No.	Title	Artist	Length
1.	"One Day" (어느 날 어느 시간에)	Kim Bum-soo	3:44
2.	"One Day" (Inst.)		3:44
Total length:			6:88

=== Part 5 ===
Released on May 9, 2020
No.	Title	Artist	Length
1.	"If You Just Love" (그저 사랑한다면)	Han Dong-geun	3:52
2.	"If You Just Love" (Inst.)		3:52
Total length:			7:14

=== Part 6 ===
Released on May 10, 2020
No.	Title	Artist	Length
1.	"When My Love Blooms" (화양연화)	Park Yo-han	4:41
2.	"When My Love Blooms" (Inst.)		4:41
Total length:			8:82

=== Part 7 ===
Released on May 16, 2020
No.	Title	Artist	Length
1.	"Wooden Bench"	Kim Hyun-joong	2:00
2.	"Wooden Bench" (Inst.)		2:00
Total length:			4:00

=== Part 8 ===
Released on May 17, 2020
No.	Title	Artist	Length
1.	"A Promise"	Dong Min-ho	3:42
2.	"A Promise" (Inst.)		3:42
Total length:			6:84

=== Part 9 ===
Released on May 23, 2020
No.	Title	Artist	Length
1.	"Even If You Don't Know" (그대는 모를지라도)	Fara Effect 1, Fara Effect 2	3:42
2.	"Even If You Don't Know" (Inst.)		3:42
Total length:			6:84

=== Part 10 ===
Released on May 24, 2020
No.	Title	Artist	Length
1.	"The Book Store" (오늘의 책)	Fara Effect 1, Fara Effect 2	2:13
2.	"The Book Store" (Inst.)		2:13
Total length:			4:26

=== Part 11 ===
Released on May 30, 2020
No.	Title	Artist	Length
1.	"With You" (둘이서)	Kim Hyun-joong	2:01
2.	"With You" (Inst.)		2:01
Total length:			4:02

=== Part 12 ===
Released on May 31, 2020
No.	Title	Artist	Length
1.	"Water Fog" (아침 안개)	Fara Effect 1, Fara Effect 2	2:37
2.	"Water Fog" (Inst.)		2:37
Total length:			4:74

=== Part 13 ===
Released on June 7, 2020
No.	Title	Artist	Length
1.	"I, The Survivor" (살아남은 이유)	Park Yo-han	4:05
2.	"I, The Survivor" (Inst.)		4:05
Total length:			8:10

== Viewership ==
When My Love Blooms : South Korea viewers per episode (thousands)

Season	Episode number																Average
Season	1	2	3	4	5	6	7	8	9	10	11	12	13	14	15	16	Average
1	1359	953	1194	907	957	854	825	834	864	807	984	795	911	763	1017	897	933

Source: Audience measurement performed nationwide by Nielsen Korea.

Average TV viewership ratings
Ep.	Original broadcast date	Average audience share	
Ep.	Original broadcast date	Nielsen Korea	
Ep.	Original broadcast date	Nationwide	Seoul
1	April 25, 2020	5.431%	6.297%
2	April 26, 2020	4.400%	5.670%
3	May 2, 2020	5.420%	6.235%
4	May 3, 2020	4.209%	4.862%
5	May 9, 2020	4.209%	5.233%
6	May 10, 2020	3.891%	4.612%
7	May 16, 2020	3.896%	4.782%
8	May 17, 2020	4.104%	5.180%
9	May 23, 2020	3.772%	4.446%
10	May 24, 2020	3.739%	4.329%
11	May 30, 2020	4.301%	4.885%
12	May 31, 2020	3.878%	4.320%
13	June 6, 2020	4.128%	4.990%
14	June 7, 2020	3.655%	4.379%
15	June 13, 2020	4.842%	5.429%
16	June 14, 2020	4.514%	5.200%
Average		4.274%	5.053%
In the table above, the blue numbers represent the lowest ratings and the red numbers represent the highest ratings.; This drama aired on a cable channel/pay TV which normally has a relatively smaller audience compared to free-to-air TV/public broadcasters (KBS, SBS, MBC and EBS).
