= Jang Seung-jo =

South Korean actor (born 1981)

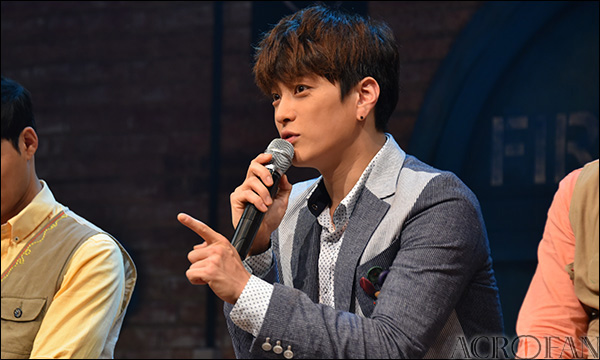
- Jang in 2014
- Born: December 13, 1981 (age 44); South Korea
- Education: Sangmyung University
- Occupation: Actor
- Years active: 2001–present
- Agent: Ace Factory
- Spouse: Lina (m. 2014)
- Children: 2

Korean name
- Hangul: 장현덕
- Hanja: 張賢德
- RR: Jang Hyeondeok
- MR: Chang Hyŏndŏk

Stage name
- Hangul: 장승조
- RR: Jang Seungjo
- MR: Chang Sŭngjo

Jang Hyun-deok (Korean: 장현덕; born December 13, 1981), known professionally as Jang Seung-jo, is a South Korean actor, known for his roles in Money Flower (2017–2018), Snowdrop (2021–2022), Familiar Wife (2018), and Encounter (2018–2019). In recent years, Jang also starred in several other dramas like Chocolate (2019–2020) and The Good Detective (2020–2022).

== Career ==
In 2025, Jang starred as Noh Jin-pyo / Jang Kang in the Netflix crime thriller television series As You Stood By.

== Personal life ==
=== Marriage and family ===
It was confirmed in 2014 that Jang had been dating SM Entertainment's The Grace member, Lina for two years. They had been seeing each other since the musical Temptation of Wolves. They got married on November 22, 2014 in a private ceremony and welcomed their first child in September 2018.

Later, on September 28, 2021, the agency announced that Jang's wife is pregnant with her second child and is due in January 2022. On December 31, Jang's wife gave birth to their second child, a daughter.

== Filmography ==
=== Film ===
Year	Title	Role	Notes
2010	Romantic Debtors	Dong-ryul	
2017	Heart Blackened	Studio head	
2020	Secret Zoo	Sungmin	

=== Television series ===
Key
†	Denotes television productions that have not yet been released

Year	Title	Role	Notes	Ref.
2014	Quiz of God	Lee Jae-joon		
2014	Liar Game	Kim Bong-geun		
2015	Splendid Politics	Prince Jeongwon		
2015	I Order You	Kevin		
2015	The Scholar Who Walks the Night	Crown Prince Sadong		
2015	All About My Mom	young Jang Cheol-woong		
2015	Six Flying Dragons	Roughneck Confucian scholar		
2016	Marrying My Daughter Twice	Choi Jae-yeong		
2017	Teacher Oh Soon Nam	Cha Yoo-min		
2017	The Package	Bae Hyeong-goo		
2017	Money Flower	Jang Boo-cheon		
2018	Familiar Wife	Yoon Joong-hoo		
2018	Encounter	Jung Woo-seok		
2019	Chocolate	Lee Joon		
2020–2022	The Good Detective	Oh Ji-hyuk	Season 1–2	
2021–2022	Snowdrop	Lee Kang-moo		
2023	Strangers Again	Goo Eun-beom		
2023–2024	Death's Game	Lee Ju-hun	Cameo	
2024	Nothing Uncovered	Seol Woo-jae		
2025	As You Stood By	Noh Jin-pyo / Jang Kang	Netflix	
2026	My Royal Nemesis	Choi Moon-do / King Anjong (Yi Jae)		
2026	Doctor X: Mafia in White	Na Dae-il	Cameo	

== Theatre ==
=== Musical theatre ===
Year	Title	Role
2005	Proposal	
2006	Cinderella & Cinderolla Story (신데렐라 신데룰라 이야기)	
2006	Dino & Flora (디노&플로라)	Buggy
2006	Miss Saigon (미스 사이공)	
2007	West Side Story (웨스트 사이드 스토리)	Tony
2007	Fix My Makeup (화장을 고치고)	Jiseop
2008	Yi Sunsin (이순신)	So Yoshitoshi
2008	Romeo and Juliet	Romeo
2008	THE COVENANT JOURNEY (언약의 여정)	Yoseph
2008	Sex is Zero (색즉시공)	Dalsu
2009	Cheong Story (청 이야기)	Heewon
2011	Temptation of Wolves (늑대의 유혹)	Jung Taesung
2011	Thrill Me	He
2012	Black Mary Poppins	Hans
2012	Sherlock Homes	Adam Anderson
2013	Mama Don't Cry	Vampire
2013	Gutenberg the Musical	Bud Davenport
2013	Trace U	Go Bunha
2014	Blood Brothers	Eddy
2014	Gutenberg the Musical	Bud Davenport
2017	The Devil	X-Black
2019	King Arthur	Arthur

=== Theater play ===
Year	Title	Role
2012	Our Bad Magnet	Gordon
2013	Model Student (모범생들)	Kim Myungjun
2014	Puzzle (퍼즐)	Simon

== Awards and nominations ==
Year	Award	Category	Nominated work	Result	Ref.
2016	SBS Drama Awards	Special Award, Actor in a Serial Drama	Marrying My Daughter Twice	Nominated	
2017	MBC Drama Awards	Male Excellence in a Weekend Drama	Money Flower	Won	
2018	6th APAN Star Awards	Excellence Award, Actor in a Serial Drama	Money Flower	Won	
2019	14th Soompi Awards	Best Supporting Actor in a Serial Drama	Familiar Wife	Nominated	
2026	Baeksang Arts Awards	Best Supporting Actor – Television	As You Stood By	Nominated	
