= Young Adult Matters =

- Theatrical release poster
- Hangul: 어른들은 몰라요
- Lit.: Adults Don't Know
- RR: Eoreundeureun mollayo
- MR: Ŏrŭndŭrŭn mollayo
- Directed by: Lee Hwan
- Written by: Lee Hwan
- Produced by: Julie Sung
- Starring: Lee Yoo-mi; Ahn Hee-yeon; Shin Haet-bit; Lee Hwan
- Cinematography: Kim Hyun-ok
- Edited by: Jo Hyun-ju
- Music by: Kang Se-woong
- Production company: Don Quijote Entertainment
- Distributed by: Little Big Pictures
- Release dates: October 24, 2020 (BIFF); May 7, 2021 (South Korea)
- Running time: 127 minutes
- Country: South Korea
- Language: Korean

Young Adult Matters (Korean: 어른들은 몰라요; RR: Eoreundeureun mollayo) is a 2020 South Korean drama film written and directed by Lee Hwan. It stars Lee Yoo-Mi and Ahn Hee-Yeon. The film premiered on October 24, 2020 at the Busan International Film Festival.

== Plot ==
18-year-old Se-jin suddenly finds herself pregnant. Exhausted by irresponsible adults, she wanders the streets and meets Joo-young, a runaway of four years who is the same age as her. Despite meeting for the first time, Se-jin and Joo-young quickly become close friends. Joined by blue-haired Jae-pil and Shin-ji—two others who seem to share their struggles—the four form an unexpected bond. Together, they embark on Se-jin's "miscarriage project".

== Cast ==
- Lee Yoo-Mi as Se-jin
- Ahn Hee-Yeon as Joo-young
- Shin Haet-bit as Yoon Se-jeong
- Lee Hwan as Jae-pil
- Park Kang-sub as Sang-seop
- Bang Eun-Jung as Eun-jeong
- Heo Joon-seok as Joon-seok
- Han Seong-soo as Shin-ji
- Kim Ga-bin as Ga-bin
- Kim Seo-ha as Detective
- Choi Eun-kyeong as Pregnant Teacher
- Lee Seung-Yeon
- Noh Susanna

== Awards and nominations ==
Year	Award	Category	Recipient	Result	Ref.
2021	Buil Film Awards	Best New Actress	Lee Yoo-Mi	Won	
2021	Buil Film Awards	Best New Actress	Ahn Hee-Yeon	Nominated	
2021	Cine21	Best New Actress of the Year	Lee Yoo-Mi	Won	
2021	Korean Film Producers Association Awards	Best Newcomer	Lee Yoo-Mi	Won	
