= Bang Eun-jung =

South Korean actress (born 1992)

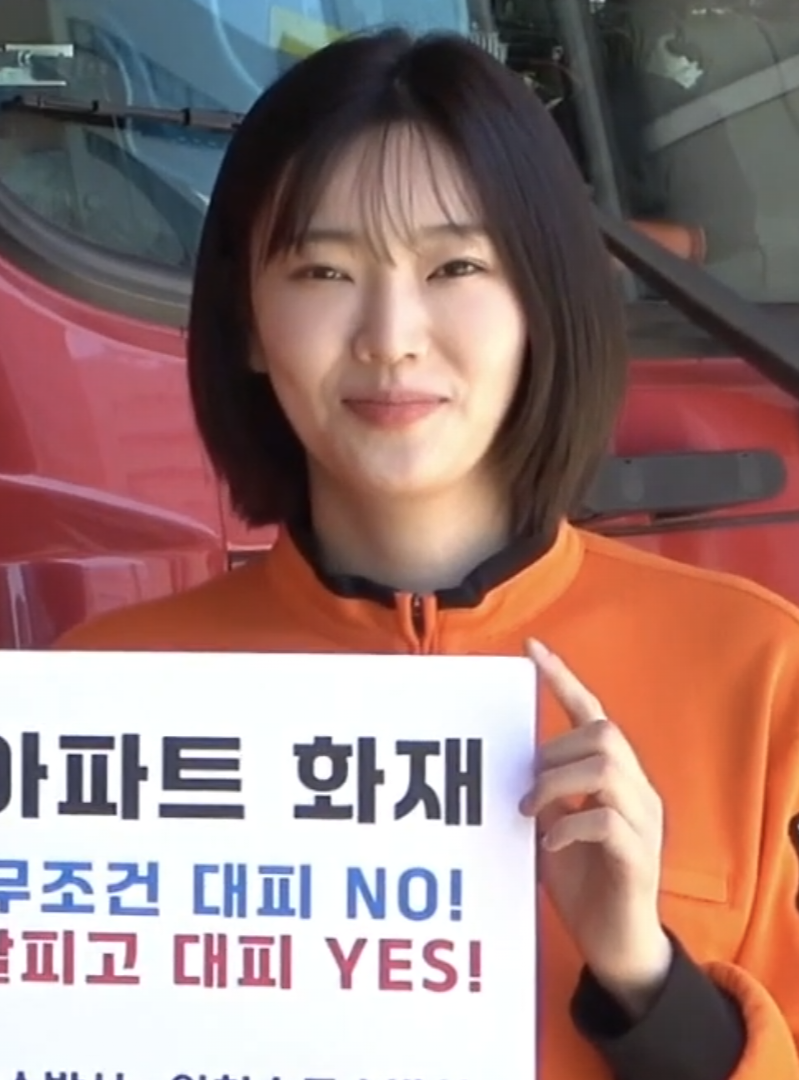
- Bang in July 2024
- Born: Bang Eun-jung; 10 August 1992 (age 34); South Korea
- Other name: Bang Eun-jeong
- Education: Sejong University (Bachelor of Film Arts)
- Occupations: Actress; model
- Years active: 2014–present
- Agent: Woongbin Ens

Bang Eun-jung (born August 10, 1992) is a South Korean actress. She is known for her roles in dramas such as The Sensible Life of Director Shin, My Roommate Is a Gumiho, No Bad Days, Peng and she also appeared in movies Park Hwa-young, Start-Up and You're So Precious to Me.

== Filmography ==
=== Television series ===
Year	Title	Role	Ref.
2016	Team Play Trap	Soo-mi	
2017	The Sensible Life of Director Shin	Eun-jung	
2017	I Need a Standard	Doo Soo-ah	
2017	No Bad Days	Lee Haru	
2018	I Need a Standard 2	Doo Soo-ah	
2018	What Are You Doing For Christmas	Mi-joo	
2021	My Roommate Is a Gumiho	Jeon Da-young	
2021	Love Refresh	Hyun Ji-eun	
2021	Peng	Doo Ru-mi	
2022	Twenty-Five Twenty-One	Lee Da-seul	
2022	The Good Detective Season 2	Sung Joo-ri	
2023	The Matchmakers	Gae Dong-yi	
2024	DNA Lover	Nam Sung-mi	

=== Film ===
Year	Title	Role	Ref.
2014	Set Me Free	Choir member	
2018	Park Hwa-young	Eun-jung	
2019	Start-Up	Kim Go-eun	
2020	Young Adult Matters	Eun-jeong	
2020	On July 7	Soo-in	
2021	You're So Precious to Me	Narrator Eun-sook	
2022	The Killer: A Girl Who Deserves to Die	Sung-yeon	

=== Music video appearances ===
Year	Title	Artist	Length	Ref.
2018	"Blind Date"	Lee Woo	04:15	
2020	"A Reason to Break Up"	Lee Woo	04:15	
2021	"Hate You"	Dodo	04:15	
