= Lee Ho-jung (model) =

South Korean model and actress (born 1997)

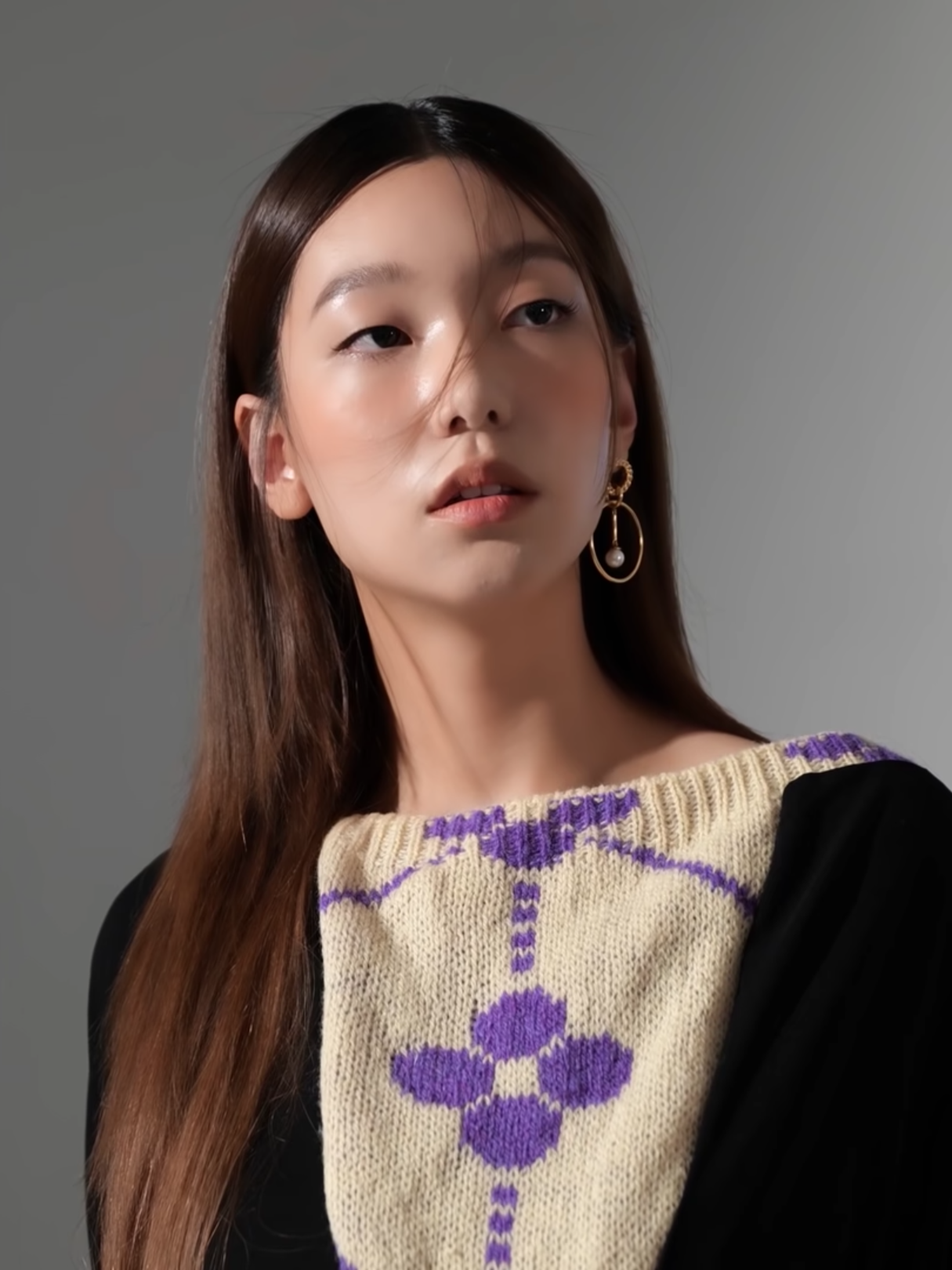
- Lee in 2021
- Born: Lee Ho-jung; 20 January 1997 (age 29); South Korea
- Other name: Holly
- Occupations: Model; actress
- Years active: 2012–present
- Agent: Management LEDO
- Height: 170 cm (5 ft 7 in)

Korean name
- Hangul: 이호정
- Hanja: 李浩貞
- RR: I Hojeong
- MR: I Hojŏng

Lee Ho-jung (Korean: 이호정; born 20 January 1997) is a South Korean model and actress. She is best known for her roles in the television series Song of the Bandits (2023) and Good Boy (2025), as well as the films Midnight Runners (2017) and The Battle of Jangsari (2019).

== Early life and education ==
Lee Ho-jung was born on January 20, 1997, in South Korea. As a child she dreamt of pursuing a career as a flight attendant. Growing up, Lee had an interest for sports which included swimming and was often known for her athletic abilities in school. In middle school, Lee was considered short with a height of 153 cm. Despite this, in eighth grade while watching Korea's Next Top Model, Lee believed she could someday become a fashion model, citing she could pose and express the designs of the products well despite her height not fitting the requirements of a runway model who averaged at 176 cm. In ninth grade she faced a sudden growth spurt and grew 15 cm and ultimately reached 170 cm during high school. The recent turn of events prompted her friends to suggest a career in modeling, which Lee considered. Lee's resolve further strengthened upon seeing veteran model Jang Yoon-ju appear on Infinite Challenge and Jin Jung-sun on the second installment of Korea's Next Top Model who won the series as a teenager. Lee subsequently began to collect information on the career through a variety of magazines.

Lee completed her secondary studies at Hanlim Multi Art School majoring in the Fashion Model department in 2013.

== Career ==
=== 2011–2015: Beginnings in modeling ===
In the summer of 2011, she enrolled into a modeling academy affiliated with ESteem Models during the summer of 2011 and began her training. 15-year-old Lee debuted in the modeling industry under ESteem Models through a magazine pictorial for Ceci. The opportunity arose when a fashion magazine editor recommended her to a veteran female model for its pictorial. Hong Jang-hyun, a well established photographer was skeptical on casting a young anonymous model until she started shooting photos of her. Since then, she has walked on designers' catwalks including Ko Tae-yong's Beyond Closet and Hong Hye-jin's The Studio K at Seoul Fashion Week. In May 2015, Lee signed a contract with YG KPlus.

=== 2016–present: Venture into acting and rising popularity ===
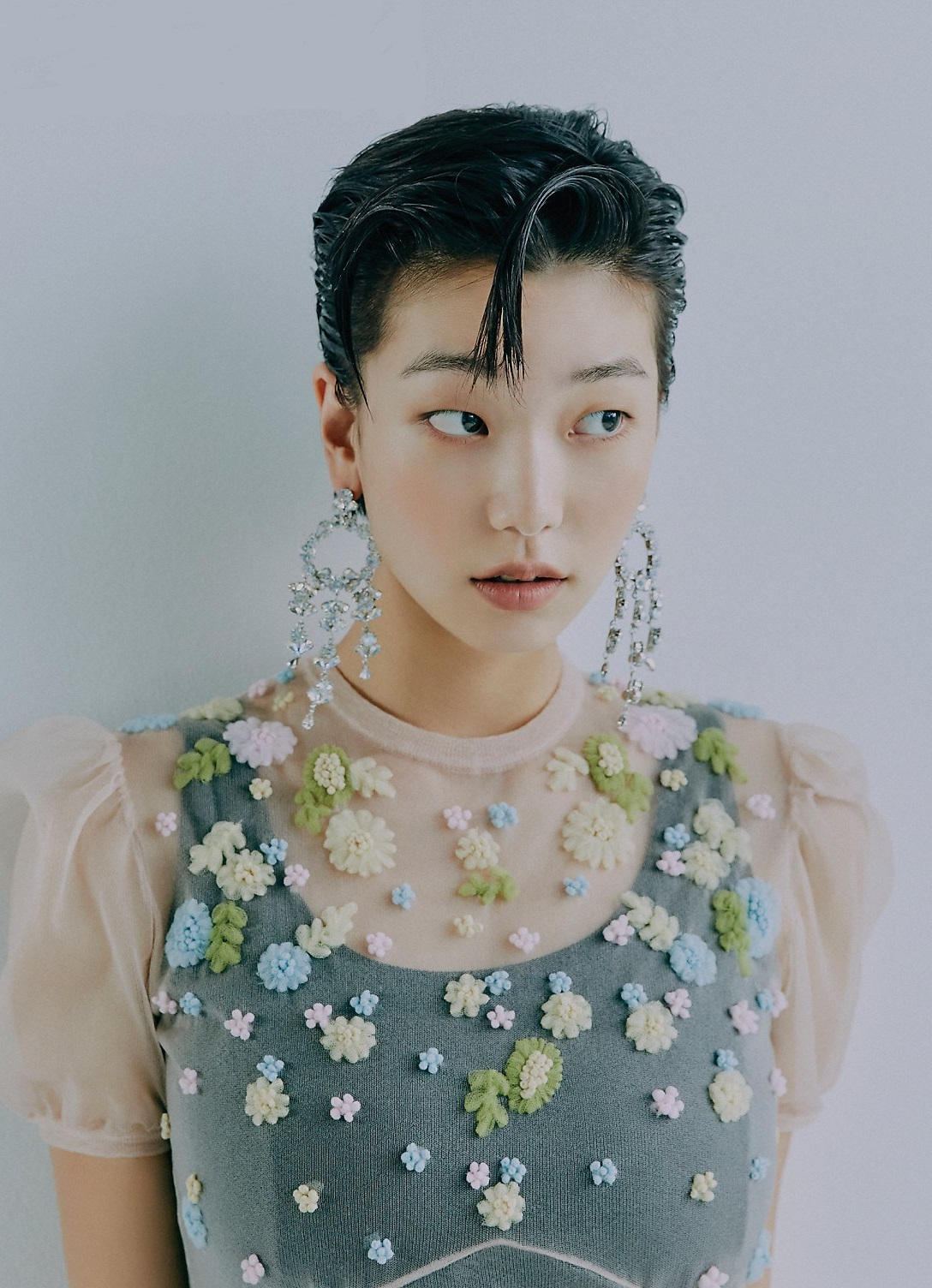
Lee for Marie Claire Korea in September 2019

Since her debut, Lee received many offers to appear as an actress. Loving her profession as a model, she denied to take acting lessons suggested by her company as she resented to rehearse and often skipped class. However, three to four years into her career, Lee began to slightly feel tired of the repetitive tasks that often came with the job. After watching the film Magic in the Moonlight by Woody Allen, Lee's mindset took a drastic turn and wanted to live as a character in the film. In result, she gained an interest in acting.

In January 2025, Lee became a free agent after her then-agency YG Entertainment decided to end its actor management business. In May of the same year, she signed a new management contract with Management LEDO, the actor management label of modelling agency Gost Corporation.

== Artistry ==
=== Fashion ===
Her interest in fashion often extended to a hobby of reforming designs of clothing personally owned by her to her own style and taste. She would then sell them at second-hand clothing stores and use the income to purchase new clothes.

=== Influences ===
Lee cited Kate Moss as a role model among models overseas due to their same height which she claims as "short" within the world of modelling. In the field of acting, Lee cites veteran actress Chun Woo-hee as a role model.

== Other ventures ==
=== Philanthropy ===
Lee alongside her mother participated in a donation campaign organized by Nylon Korea for single mothers in South Korea. The campaign pictorial included 10 pairs of celebrities and influencers which was published in the November issue of the magazine. Lee donated her entire modelling fee towards the campaign while funds were also raised by selling bags produced by the participants. Portion of the profits were donated to the Eastern Social Welfare Society.

== Filmography ==
=== Film ===
Year	Title		Role	Notes	Ref.
Year	English	Korean	Role	Notes	Ref.
2017	Midnight Runners	청년경	Lee Yoon-jung		
2019	The Battle of Jangsari	장사리: 잊혀진 영웅들	Moon Jong-nyeo		
2020	Unalterable	얼굴없는 보스	Shin Mi-young		
2021	Hostage: Missing Celebrity	인질	Saet-byeol		
2023	My Heart Puppy	멍뭉이	On-woo	Cameo	
2024	Escape	탈주	Wandering rifle girl		

=== Television series ===
Year	Title		Role	Notes	Ref.
Year	English	Korean	Role	Notes	Ref.
2016	Moon Lovers: Scarlet Heart Ryeo	달의 연인 - 보보경심 려	Ae-ra	Cameo (Episode 1)	
2016	Night Light	불야성	Son Ma-ri		
2018	Let Me Introduce Her	그녀로 말할 것 같으면	Lee Hyun-soo		
2021	Nevertheless	알고있지만	Yoon-sol		
2022	Jinxed at First	징크스의 연인	Jo Jang-kyung		
2025	Good Boy	굿보이	Kim Yeon-ha / Drug Monster		

=== Web series ===
Year	Title		Role	Notes	Ref.
Year	English	Korean	Role	Notes	Ref.
2018	Flower Ever After	이런 꽃 같은 엔딩	Han So-young		
2023	Moving	무빙	Yang Se-eun	Cameo	
2023	Song of the Bandits	도적: 칼의 소리	Eon Nyeon-i		
2025	As You Stood By	당신이 죽였다	detective Noh Jin-young	Netflix	

=== Music video appearances ===
Year	Title	Artist	Length	Ref.
2012	Sorry I'm Sorry	Kim Hyung-jun	4:23	
2012	Baby Good Night (おやすみ Good Night) (JPN version)	B1A4	3:50	
2013	You Don't Know Love (촌스럽게 왜 이래)	K.Will	4:28	
2013	Let's Talk About You (너부터 잘 해) (featuring Bomi of Apink)	M.I.B	3:54	
2014	Backhug (뒤에서 안아줘)	Lyn	2:03	
2014	Miss You ... Crying (보고 싶어...운다)	Lyn	4:40	
2014	Missing (쉽지않아)	Teen Top	4:05	
2015	Hey Jude	Shin Ji-soo	3:48	
2015	Let's Not Fall In Love (우리 사랑하지 말아요)	Big Bang	3:48	
2015	Mayo (마요) (featuring Beenzino)	Shin Seung-hun	4:12	
2016	I Am You, You Are Me (너는 나 나는 너)	Zico	3:36	
2016	I Don't Love You (널 사랑하지 않아)	Urban Zakapa	4:16	

== Awards and nominations ==
Name of the award ceremony, year presented, category, nominee of the award, and the result of the nomination
Award ceremony	Year	Category	Nominee / Work	Result	Ref.
Fashion Photographer's Night	2013	Rookie of the Year Award	Lee Ho-jung	Won	
Korea Best Dressed Swan Awards	2015	Female Model	Lee Ho-jung	Won	
Talent Award	2021	Miz Model Korea Selection Contest	Lee Ho-jung	Won	
Korea Drama Awards	2025	Scene Stealer Award Female	Good Boy	Won	
