= Lee Lee =

Lee Lee, Lee-Lee, or Leelee is the name of:

== Arts and entertainment ==
- LeeLee Films, established by In-Ah Lee and Grace Lee (director) in 2006, production company of American Zombie and The Grace Lee Project
- "Leelee" Sobieski (given names Liliane Rudabet Gloria Elsveta; also known as Leelee Kimmel; born 1983), American artist and retired actress
- Lee-Lee Chan (1916–2002), Jackie Chan's mother
- Lily Lau Lee Lee (Chinese: 劉莉莉; born 1966), Hong Kong cartoonist
- Lee Lee Lan (real name Tan Lee Lan; 1944–2022), Malaysian ballet dancer and choreographer
- Leelee Chan (Chinese: 陳麗同; born 1984), Hong Kong–based contemporary mixed-media artist and sculptor
- Lee Lee Tsin (Chinese: 李麗珍), Hakka name of actress Rachel Lee, originally known as Loletta Lee Lai-chun — see list of Hakka people
- Leelee Greene, played Gossip Girl in Mohawk Girls (TV series)
- Leelee Wiginton, a contestant on two episodes of Cutthroat Kitchen: "Wham, Clam, Thank You, Ma'am" (in season 2) and "Evilicious: Frying First Class"
- Leelee Byoma, played Wunmi in Knocking on Heaven's Door (2014 film)
- Leelee, the stage name of Adrienne Janic as one of the Original Fantanas, yellow for pineapple Fanta
- Elisa "LeeLee" Scaldaferri, a contributor or guest of LoadingReadyRun
- Leelee Koh, wife of Lai Kui Fang
- (Kathie) Lee (Lee Beng/Bang), the 1983 Miss Universe Singapore titleholder, who placed eighth at Miss Universe 1983 — see also List of Miss Universe countries § Entrants (1952–present)
- Seol Lee Lee, did not compete in Miss Intercontinental in 2023 — see Miss and Mister Korea beauty pageants § Summary
- Lau Lee-lee (Chinese: 劉莉莉), author of Mom's Drawer is at the Bottom (媽媽的抽屜在最; 1998) and co-author of Cartoonet (漫畫網絡; 1998) — see list of manhua
- Ollisha "Lee Lee" Davis, Amy Slaton-Lovvorn's friend, recurring in season 8 of 1000-lb Sisters
- Law Lee Lee (English name: Eloise), a contestant on I Wanna Be a Model season 1 episode 13
- Mak Lee Lee, Hong Kong artist, 1976–1994 wife of Ng Man-tat
- Tong Lee-Lee, a cast member of It's a Woman's World (aka The Thirty-six Amazons), 1939 — see list of Hong Kong films before 1950
- Chow Lee-lee, who played Lim's Mother in The Peach Girl
- Lee Lee, Apple Watts' friend, and a guest star in Love & Hip Hop: Hollywood season 5 episode 1 (no. 59 overall)
- Lau Lee Lee, who played Pipa Artist's Daughter in Bruce Lee, D-Day at Macao
- Lau Lee-Lee (Chinese: 劉莉莉), a member of the cast of The Haunted Cop Shop

=== Music ===
- Lee Lee, a music video shot by Okechukwu Oku for Resonance
- Lee Lee, a Deepside Deejays Remix of Lili Sandu
- Leelee, a producer and writer on Magic Man (Jackson Wang album) — see also list of songs written by Jackson Wang
- Leelee Haxi, featured on Sky High (Mixmash Records catalogue no. MIXMA222), 2016
- LeeLee, creator of "Looks Good On You", which Cahill remixed
- LeeLee, a producer of "Always Love" on the planned track listing of Withered Deluxe: Marcescence, disc 2 of Withered by D4vd
- Eun Duk "Daniel" Lee Lee, ex-boyfriend of Ailee, and acting vice president of 6Theory Media, owner of allkpop, in 2013
- Lee Lee Sang / Lee Lee-sang, who contributed synthesizer and arrangement to MemeM, Into Violet, and Hide & Seek (Purple Kiss EP)
- Lee Lee Tha Trouble Maka, who featured Luni Coleone in Chasin' Glory
- DJ Lee Lee, a host at The New Penny

=== Fictional characters ===
- Leelee Pimvare, a character in Power Rangers Mystic Force
- Leelee Satterfield, in novels by Lisa Patton
- Leelee, played by Tony Zanoni in Killer Nerd
- Leelee, played by Dayle McLeod, in the TV series The Expanse, season 4
- LeeLee, in A Black Lady Sketch Show, S2 E3 (#9) "Sister, May I Call You Oshun?"
- Leelee, voiced by Tabyana Ali in two episodes of Shimmer and Shine
- Lee Lee, a recurring character in Dexter's Laboratory episodes
- Lee Lee La La, voiced by Erica Schroeder in Shaman King
- Mrs. Lee Lee, played by Emily Kuroda in The Suburbans

== Politics ==
- John Lee Lee (né Hanning; 1802–1874), British Whig politician
- Heng Lee Lee (Chinese: 王丽丽; born 1979), Malaysian politician and former reporter
- "Lee Lee", nickname of Juandalynn (Deleathia) Givan (born 1970 or 1971), American attorney, business owner, and Democrat politician in Alabama
- Lily Yong Lee Lee, a member of the Sarawak United Peoples' Party, a 2010 Political Organisations Division commander of the Order of Meritorious Service, and one of the women in state legislative assemblies of Malaysia, the representative for N08 Padungan elected in the 2001 Sarawak state election — see also list of Malaysian State Assembly Representatives (1999–2004)
- Lee Lee of Chorley, Lancashire, father of Henry Lee (Southampton MP)
- Lee Lee-jae, Saenuri politician, representing the Donghae–Samcheok constituency of Gangwon Province in the 19th session — see list of members of the National Assembly (South Korea), 2012–2016

== Sports ==
- Lee Lee Park, Tin Can Bay, the home ground of the Cooloola Coast Dolphins — see Australian rules football leagues in regional Queensland
- LeeLee Morrison-Henry (born 1960, Massachusetts), Canadian freestyle skier
- Lim Lee Lee, a Malaysian karateka — see Special:WhatLinksHere/Lim Lee Lee and Special:Search/"Lim Lee Lee"
- Leelee Bell, the winner of the 2026 North Dakota Miss Basketball award
- Tsoi Lee Lee, a member of the Hong Kong team in beach woodball at the 2016 Asian Beach Games
- Loo Lee Lee / Lee Lee Loo, a member of the Malaysia team in beach woodball at the 2016 Asian Beach Games and woodball at the 2025 SEA Games (see also Malaysia at the 2025 SEA Games)
- Lee Lee Pender, a boxer, who was knocked out once by Thomas Williams Jr. in 2011
- Yia Lee-lee, a Kung Fu fighter who lost a match to Muay Thai fighter Neth Saknarong in 1974
- Lee Lee, a Malaysian swimmer — see 2017 in aquatic sports § 2017 FINA Synchronized Swimming World Series
- Lee Lee Willis, a guard on the 2023–24 and 2024–25 Kennesaw State Owls women's basketball team

== Education ==
- Chua Lee Lee, principal of Kuen Cheng High School since 2018
- Wong Lee Lee (Chinese: 王莉莉女士), 2013–2022 principal of Bishop Hall Jubilee School
- Mdm. Gan Lee Lee, 2017–2023 headmistress of Methodist Girls' School, Ipoh
- Ms Wong Lee Lee, principal of SKH Bishop Mok Sau Tseng Secondary School

== Other uses ==
- Soh Lee Lee (Chinese: 苏莉莉; c. 1955 – 1983), housewife who was murdered in Ang Mo Kio, Singapore
- Lori Lee Lee, a 50-year old killed in 2013 by law enforcement in the United States, in Champion, Michigan
- Lee Lee Seung, a character played by Gordon Liu in Twin of Brothers
- Lee Lee Aow, eldest daughter of Boon Kee Aow and namesake of × Renantanda Lily Aow
- Dr chiu Lee-lee, Lily, awardee of a Bronze Bauhinia Star in 2009

== See also ==
- Lee & Lee (formed 1955), Singaporean law firm
- Lee Lee-zen (Chinese: 李李仁; born 1974), Taiwanese actor, television host and singer
- Lee Lee-feng (also spelled Li-Feng Li), the winner of the 24th Golden Bell Award for Best Leading Actress in a Television Series in 1989, for playing Cassia in Moment in Peking (1988 TV series)
- Lee Lee-fong, who played Lee Hsin-pei in One Side of the Water
- Lee Lee-jin, a contributor to the lyrics of "Dimension" (AAA Version) on Access (EP) by Acid Angel from Asia and "Love Is Lonely" on Fe3O4: Stick Out by Nmixx
- Hemas Kla-Lee-Lee-Kla, the Kwak’wala name of Bill Wilson (chief)
- Coqsseʻleelʻee, a legendary character in the mythology of Nakhi people
- Two works by Alicia Keys:
  - The Journals of Mama Mae and LeeLee: iOS app, in partnership with Bento Box Entertainment
  - Blue Moon: From the Journals of MaMa Mae and LeeLee: book, coauthored with Jessica Walton — see also: Here (Alicia Keys album) § Background and development
- "Statement: Lee Lee" by Move, in Black Radical Love, released 2023
- "Song for Lee Lee" by Chick Corea, in Piano Improvisations Vol. 2, released 1972
- Lee Jhe-huei and Lee Yang, Taiwanese badminton players who often partnered in men's doubles
- Lee (disambiguation)
- Li Li (disambiguation)
- Lily (disambiguation)
- Leele (disambiguation)
- Lele (disambiguation)
- Leo Lee (disambiguation)
