= Lele =

Lele may refer to:

== Places ==
- Lélé, Cameroon
  - Lélé River of the Cameroon
- Lele, Nepal
- Lele, the Hungarian name for Lelei village, Hodod Commune, Satu Mare County, Romania
- Lele, Togo
- Lele, an ancient name of Lahaina, Hawaii

== Languages ==
- Lele language (Bantu)
  - Lele people, from the Democratic Republic of the Congo
- Lele language (Chad), an Afro-Asiatic language
- Lele language (Guinea), a Mande language
- Lele language (Papua New Guinea), an Austronesian language
- Lyélé language, a Niger–Congo language, also known as Lele
- Tiagba language, a Niger–Congo language, also known as Lélé

== People ==
- Lele Forood (born 1956), American college tennis coach
- Lele Hardy (born 1988), American basketball player
- Lele Marchitelli (born 1955), Italian musician
- Lele Pons (born 1996), American internet celebrity
- João Filgueiras Lima (1931–2014), Brazilian architect also known as Lelé
- Ambrus Lele (born 1958), Hungarian handballer
- Ashish Kishore Lele (born 1967), Indian chemical engineer
- Boniface Lele (1947–2014), Roman Catholic bishop
- Lailatou Amadou Lele (born 1983), Nigerien taekwondo practitioner
- Pushkar Lele (born 1979), Hindustani classical vocalist
- Ramachandra Datatraya Lele (born 1928), Indian physician
- Shrikant Lele (born 1943), Indian metallurgical engineer
- William Lele, English Member of Parliament in 1406
- Yu Lele (born 1989), Chinese competitor in synchronized swimming
- Lele (footballer), Spanish footballer
- Lele (singer) (born 1996), Italian singer-songwriter
- Lelé (1918–2003), Brazilian footballer
- Lelê (footballer, born 1990), Wesley de Jesus Correia, Brazilian footballer
- Lelê (footballer, born 1997), Leanderson da Silva Genésio, Brazilian footballer

== Other uses ==
- Lele, Indonesian, Javanese, and Sundanese word for catfish, as in the dish Pecel Lele
- Tapu Lele, a generation VII Pokémon species
- Lele (mascot), the official mascot of the Nanjing 2014 Summer Youth Olympics
- Iso Lele, a car produced by the Italian manufacturer Iso Automoveicoli S.p.A. between 1969 and 1974

== See also ==
- Lelu (disambiguation)
- Leele (disambiguation)
- Fu Niu Lele, the mascot of the 2008 Summer Paralympics in Beijing
- Mr. Lele, an Indian film by Shashank Khaitan scheduled for a 2021 release
