= Lélé =

Lélé may refer to:

== Places ==
- Lélé River, a river in Cameroon
- Lélé, Cameroon, a town in southern Cameroon

== Other uses ==
- Lélé language, spoken in the Sanguié Province of Burkina Faso
