= November 14 =

November 14 this year in various calendars
- Saturday, 14 November 2026
Akan	Nwonamemene
Armenian	27 Trē 1476
Aztec	Tlacaxipehualiztli 3, 10 Cōzcacuāuhtli
Babylonian	3 Arakhsamna, 2337 SE
Balinese pawukon	Luang, Pepet, Beteng, Laba, Keliwon, Aryang, Saniscara of Landep, Brahma, Jangur, Raja
Bengali	29 Kartik, BS 1433
Chinese	Yang Water Dragon・Root Mansion; Fire Horse Year, Month 10, Day 6 (Lidong, 8 days until Xiaoxue)
Common Era	14 November 2026 CE
Coptic	5 Hathor, AM 1743
Egyptian	2 Pharmuthi, 2775 NE
Ethiopian	5 H̱edār, 2019 Amätä Məhrät
French Republican	Décade III, Tridi de Brumaire de l'Année 235 de la République
Gregorian	14 November, AD 2026
Hebrew	4 Kislev, AM 5787
Hindu	Pūrvāṣāḍha・Dhṛti; Solar: 28 Kārtika, 1948 SE; Lunisolar: Pañcamī, Śukla pakṣa of Kārtika, 2083 VE; Rāudra・5127 KY・1,872,893
Icelandic	Laugardagur, 22 Gormánuður 2026
Islamic	3 Jumada al-thani, AH 1448 (using tabular method)
ISO week date	2026-W46-6
Japanese	6 Kannazuki, Reiwa 8 (Rittō, 8 days until Shōsetsu)
Julian	1 November, AD 2026 (AM 7535)
Julian day	2461359
Korean	6 Dwaejidal, 4359 DE
Maya	13.0.14.1.16; 9 Ceh, 10 Cib
Roman	Kalendis Novembribus, MMDCCLXXIX AUC
Solar Hijri	23 Aban, SH 1405
Tibetan	5 smin drug, me pho rta 2153 or 1772 or 1000

<<	November					>>
Su	Mo	Tu	We	Th	Fr	Sa
1	2	3	4	5	6	7
8	9	10	11	12	13	14
15	16	17	18	19	20	21
22	23	24	25	26	27	28
29	30
2026

November 14 in recent years
2026 (Saturday)
2025 (Friday)
2024 (Thursday)
2023 (Tuesday)
2022 (Monday)
2021 (Sunday)
2020 (Saturday)
2019 (Thursday)
2018 (Wednesday)
2017 (Tuesday)

November 14 is the 318th day of the year (319th in leap years) in the Gregorian calendar; 47 days remain until the end of the year.

== Events ==
=== Pre-1600 ===
- 332 BC – Alexander the Great is crowned pharaoh of Egypt.
- 565 – Justin II becomes Byzantine emperor following the death of emperor Justinian I.

=== 1601–1900 ===
- 1680 – German astronomer Gottfried Kirch discovers the Great Comet of 1680, the first comet to be discovered by telescope.
- 1715 – Hanoverian forces defeat the Jacobite rebels in the battle of Preston, ending the Jacobite rising of 1715.
- 1770 – James Bruce discovers what he believes to be the source of the Nile.
- 1812 – Napoleonic Wars: At the Battle of Smoliani, French Marshals Victor and Oudinot are defeated by the Russians under General Peter Wittgenstein.
- 1851 – Moby-Dick, a novel by Herman Melville, is published in the USA.
- 1889 – Pioneering female journalist Nellie Bly (aka Elizabeth Cochrane) begins a successful attempt to travel around the world in less than 80 days. She completes the trip in 72 days.

=== 1901–present ===
- 1910 – Aviator Eugene Burton Ely performs the first takeoff from a ship in Hampton Roads, Virginia, taking off from a makeshift deck on the USS Birmingham in a Curtiss pusher.
- 1914 – The Joensuu City Hall, designed by Eliel Saarinen, was inaugurated in Joensuu, Finland.
- 1918 – The Provisional National Assembly of the new republic of Czechoslovakia meets to devise a constitution.
- 1920 – Pesäpallo, the Finnish version of baseball developed by Lauri Pihkala, is played for the first time at Kaisaniemi Park in Helsinki.
- 1921 – The Communist Party of Spain is founded, and issues the first edition of Mundo obrero.
- 1922 – The British Broadcasting Company begins radio service in the United Kingdom.
- 1938 – The Lions Gate Bridge, connecting Vancouver to the North Shore region, opens to traffic.
- 1940 – World War II: In England, Coventry is heavily bombed by German Luftwaffe bombers. Coventry Cathedral is almost completely destroyed.
- 1941 – World War II: The aircraft carrier HMS Ark Royal sinks due to torpedo damage from the German submarine U-81 sustained on November 13.
- 1941 – World War II: German troops, aided by local auxiliaries, murder nine thousand residents of the Słonim Ghetto in a single day.
- 1952 – The New Musical Express publishes the first regular UK Singles Chart.
- 1957 – The "Apalachin meeting" in rural Tioga County in upstate New York is raided by law enforcement; many high-level Mafia figures are arrested while trying to flee.
- 1960 – Ruby Bridges becomes the first black child to attend an all-white elementary school in Louisiana.
- 1965 – Vietnam War: The Battle of Ia Drang begins. This is the first major engagement between regular American and North Vietnamese forces.
- 1967 – The Congress of Colombia, in commemoration of the 150th anniversary of the death of Policarpa Salavarrieta, declares this day as "Day of the Colombian Woman".
- 1967 – American physicist Theodore Maiman is given a patent for his ruby laser systems, the world's first laser.
- 1969 – Apollo program: NASA launches Apollo 12, the second crewed mission to the surface of the Moon.
- 1970 – Soviet Union enters ICAO, making Russian the fourth official language of organization.
- 1970 – Southern Airways Flight 932 crashes in the mountains near Huntington, West Virginia, killing 75, including almost all of the Marshall University football team.
- 1971 – Mariner 9 enters orbit around Mars.
- 1973 – In the United Kingdom, Princess Anne marries Captain Mark Phillips, in Westminster Abbey.
- 1973 – The Athens Polytechnic uprising, a massive demonstration of popular rejection of the Greek military junta of 1967–74, begins.
- 1975 – With the signing of the Madrid Accords, Spain abandons Western Sahara.
- 1977 – During a British House of Commons debate, Labour MP Tam Dalyell poses what would become known as the West Lothian question, referring to issues related to devolution in the United Kingdom.
- 1978 – France conducts the Aphrodite nuclear test as 25th in the group of 29 1975–78 French nuclear tests.
- 1979 – US President Jimmy Carter issues Executive Order 12170, freezing all Iranian assets in the United States in response to the hostage crisis.
- 1982 – Lech Wałęsa, the leader of Poland's outlawed Solidarity movement, is released after eleven months of internment near the Soviet border.
- 1982 – Reverend Caesar "Butch" Conde leads first worship service of the Bread of Life Ministries International in the Philippines.
- 1984 – Zamboanga City mayor Cesar Climaco, a prominent critic of the government of Philippine President Ferdinand Marcos, is assassinated in his home city.
- 1990 – After German reunification, the Federal Republic of Germany and Poland sign a treaty confirming the Oder–Neisse line as the border between Germany and Poland.
- 1990 – While on approach to Zurich Airport, Alitalia Flight 404 crashes into Stadlerberg Mountain near Weiach, killing 46.
- 1991 – American and British authorities announce indictments against two Libyan intelligence officials in connection with the downing of the Pan Am Flight 103.
- 1991 – Cambodian Prince Norodom Sihanouk returns to Phnom Penh after thirteen years in exile.
- 1992 – In poor conditions caused by Cyclone Forrest, Vietnam Airlines Flight 474 crashes near Nha Trang, killing 30.
- 1995 – A budget standoff between Democrats and Republicans in the U.S. Congress forces the federal government to temporarily close national parks and museums and to run most government offices with skeleton staffs.
- 2001 – War in Afghanistan: Afghan Northern Alliance fighters take over the capital Kabul.
- 2001 – A magnitude 7.8 earthquake strikes a remote part of the Tibetan Plateau. It has the longest known surface rupture recorded on land (~400 km) and is the best documented example of a supershear earthquake.
- 2003 – Astronomers discover Sedna, a distant trans-Neptunian dwarf planet.
- 2008 – The first G-20 economic summit opens in Washington, D.C.
- 2008 – Space Shuttle Endeavour launches on STS-126 to continue assembly of the International Space Station.
- 2012 – Israel launches a major military operation in the Gaza Strip in response to an escalation of rocket attacks by Hamas.
- 2016 – A magnitude 7.8 earthquake strikes Kaikōura, New Zealand, at a depth of 15 km (9 miles), resulting in the deaths of two people.
- 2017 – A gunman kills four people and injures 12 others during a shooting spree across Rancho Tehama, California. He had earlier murdered his wife in their home.
- 2019 – A mass shooting occurs at Saugus High School in Santa Clarita, California, resulting in three deaths, including that of the perpetrator, and three injuries.

== Births ==
=== Pre-1600 ===
- 1449 – Sidonie of Poděbrady, daughter of King of Bohemia (died 1510)
- 1487 – John III of Pernstein, Bohemian land-owner, Governor of Moravia and Count of Kladsko (died 1548)
- 1501 – Anna of Oldenburg, Regent of East Frisia (died 1575)
- 1531 – Richard Topcliffe, English torturer (died 1604)

=== 1601–1900 ===
- 1601 – John Eudes, French priest and missionary (died 1680)
- 1650 – William III of England, Prince of Orange, King of England, Scotland and Ireland (died 1702)
- 1663 – Friedrich Wilhelm Zachow, German organist and composer (died 1712)
- 1719 – Leopold Mozart, Austrian violinist, composer, and conductor (died 1787)
- 1765 – Robert Fulton, American engineer, early steamboat pioneer (died 1815)
- 1771 – Marie François Xavier Bichat, French anatomist and physiologist (died 1802)
- 1776 – Henri Dutrochet, French physician, botanist, and physiologist (died 1847)
- 1777 – Nathaniel Claiborne, American farmer and politician (died 1859)
- 1778 – Johann Nepomuk Hummel, Austrian pianist and composer (died 1837)
- 1779 – Adam Oehlenschläger, Danish poet and playwright (died 1850)
- 1797 – Charles Lyell, Scottish geologist (died 1875)
- 1803 – Jacob Abbott, American author (died 1879)
- 1805 – Fanny Hensel, German pianist and composer (died 1847)
- 1812 – Aleardo Aleardi, Italian poet (died 1878)
- 1812 – Maria Cristina of Savoy (died 1836)
- 1816 – John Curwen, English minister and educator (died 1880)
- 1828 – James B. McPherson, American general (died 1864)
- 1832 – Henry Strangways, English-Australian politician, 12th Premier of South Australia (died 1920)
- 1838 – August Šenoa, Croatian author, poet, and critic (died 1881)
- 1840 – Claude Monet, French painter (died 1926)
- 1845 – Ulisse Dini, Italian mathematician and politician (died 1918)
- 1856 – Madeleine Lemoyne Ellicott, American activist (died 1945)
- 1861 – Frederick Jackson Turner, American historian and author (died 1932)
- 1863 – Leo Baekeland, Belgian-American chemist and engineer (died 1944)
- 1869 – John Lumsden, Irish physician, founded the St. John Ambulance Brigade of Ireland (died 1944)
- 1871 – Wajed Ali Khan Panni, Bengali aristocrat and philanthropist (died 1936)
- 1875 – Gregorio del Pilar, Filipino general and politician (died 1899)
- 1875 – Jakob Schaffner, Swiss author and activist (died 1944)
- 1877 – Norman Brookes, Australian tennis player (died 1968)
- 1878 – Julie Manet, French painter and art collector (died 1966)
- 1878 – Leopold Staff, Ukrainian-Polish poet and academic (died 1957)
- 1883 – Ado Birk, Estonian lawyer and politician, 3rd Prime Minister of Estonia (died 1942)
- 1889 – Jawaharlal Nehru, Indian lawyer and politician, 1st Prime Minister of India (died 1964)
- 1891 – Frederick Banting, Canadian physician and academic, Nobel Prize laureate (died 1941)
- 1893 – Addie Viola Smith, American lawyer and trade commissioner (died 1975)
- 1895 – Walter Jackson Freeman II, American physician and psychiatrist (died 1972)
- 1897 – John Steuart Curry, American painter and academic (died 1946)
- 1898 – Benjamin Fondane, Romanian-French philosopher, poet, and critic (died 1944)
- 1900 – Aaron Copland, American composer, conductor, and educator (died 1990)

=== 1901–present ===
- 1904 – Harold Haley, American lawyer and judge (died 1970)
- 1904 – Harold Larwood, English-Australian cricketer (died 1995)
- 1904 – Dick Powell, American actor, singer, director, and producer (died 1963)
- 1905 – John Henry Barbee, American singer and guitarist (died 1964)
- 1906 – Louise Brooks, American actress and dancer (died 1985)
- 1907 – Howard W. Hunter, American religious leader, 14th President of The Church of Jesus Christ of Latter-day Saints (died 1995)
- 1907 – Astrid Lindgren, Swedish author and screenwriter (died 2002)
- 1907 – William Steig, American author, illustrator, and sculptor (died 2003)
- 1908 – Joseph McCarthy, American captain, lawyer, and politician (died 1957)
- 1908 – Harrison Salisbury, American journalist and author (New York Times correspondent in Moscow) (died 1993)
- 1910 – Rosemary DeCamp, American actress and singer (died 2001)
- 1910 – Eric Malpass, English author (died 1996)
- 1912 – Barbara Hutton, American philanthropist (died 1979)
- 1912 – Tung-Yen Lin, Chinese-American engineer, designed the Guandu Bridge (died 2003)
- 1914 – Ken Carson, American Western singer (died 1994)
- 1915 – Mabel Fairbanks, American figure skater and coach (died 2001)
- 1915 – Martha Tilton, American singer and actress (died 2006)
- 1916 – Roger Apéry, Greek-French mathematician and academic (died 1994)
- 1916 – Sherwood Schwartz, American screenwriter and producer (died 2011)
- 1917 – Park Chung Hee, South Korean general and politician, 3rd President of South Korea (died 1979)
- 1918 – John Bromwich, Australian tennis player (died 1999)
- 1919 – Johnny Desmond, American singer (died 1985)
- 1919 – Lisa Otto, German soprano and actress (died 2013)
- 1920 – Mary Greyeyes, the first First Nations woman to join the Canadian Armed Forces (died 2011)
- 1921 – Ea Jansen, Estonian historian and academic (died 2005)
- 1921 – Brian Keith, American actor and director (died 1997)
- 1922 – Boutros Boutros-Ghali, Egyptian politician and diplomat, 6th Secretary General of the United Nations (died 2016)
- 1922 – Veronica Lake, American actress and singer (died 1973)
- 1924 – Leonid Kogan, Ukrainian-Russian violinist and educator (died 1982)
- 1925 – Stirling Colgate, American physicist and academic (died 2013)
- 1925 – Roy Medvedev, Soviet historian and activist (Let History Judge) (died 2026)
- 1925 – Zhores Medvedev, Soviet biologist, writer and activist (Nuclear Disaster in the Urals) (died 2018)
- 1925 – James Mellaart, English archaeologist and author (died 2012)
- 1927 – Lawrie Barratt, English businessman, founded Barratt Developments (died 2012)
- 1927 – Bart Cummings, Australian horse trainer (died 2015)
- 1927 – McLean Stevenson, American actor and screenwriter (died 1996)
- 1927 – Narciso Yepes, Spanish guitarist and composer (died 1997)
- 1928 – Kathleen Hughes, American actress (died 2025)
- 1929 – Jimmy Piersall, American baseball player and sportscaster (died 2017)
- 1930 – Shirley Crabtree, English wrestler (died 1997)
- 1930 – Peter Katin, English pianist and academic (died 2015)
- 1930 – Monique Mercure, Canadian actress (died 2020)
- 1930 – Michael Robbins, English actor (died 1992)
- 1930 – Ed White, American engineer and astronaut (died 1967)
- 1932 – Gunter Sachs, German astrologer and photographer (died 2011)
- 1933 – Fred Haise, American pilot, engineer, and astronaut
- 1934 – Dave Mackay, Scottish-English footballer and manager (died 2015)
- 1934 – Ellis Marsalis, Jr., American pianist and educator (died 2020)
- 1934 – Catherine McGuinness, Irish lawyer, judge, and politician
- 1935 – Hussein of Jordan (died 1999)
- 1935 – Lefteris Papadopoulos, Greek songwriter and journalist
- 1936 – Carey Bell, American singer and harmonica player (died 2007)
- 1936 – Freddie Garrity, English singer and actor (died 2006)
- 1936 – Cornell Gunter, American R&B singer (died 1990)
- 1937 – Alan J. W. Bell, English director and producer (died 2023)
- 1937 – Murray Oliver, Canadian ice hockey player and coach (died 2014)
- 1939 – Wendy Carlos, American keyboard player and composer
- 1942 – Manon Cleary, American painter and academic (died 2011)
- 1942 – Natalia Gutman, Russian cellist and educator
- 1943 – Peter Norton, American programmer and author
- 1944 – Karen Armstrong, English author and academic
- 1944 – Mike Katz, American bodybuilder and football player
- 1945 – Louise Ellman, English academic and politician
- 1945 – Vikram Gokhale, Indian actor and director (died 2022)
- 1945 – Brett Lunger, American race car driver
- 1946 – Bharathan, Indian director and screenwriter (died 1998)
- 1946 – Roland Duchâtelet, Belgian businessman and politician
- 1946 – Jay Ungar, American folk musician and composer (Ashokan Farewell)
- 1947 – P. J. O'Rourke, American political satirist and journalist (died 2022)
- 1947 – Nat Young, Australian surfer and author
- 1947 – Buckwheat Zydeco, American accordion player (died 2016)
- 1948 – Charles III, King of the United Kingdom and 14 other Commonwealth realms
- 1948 – Paul Dacre, English journalist
- 1948 – Michael Dobbs, English author and politician
- 1948 – Robert Ginty, American actor and producer (died 2009)
- 1949 – Raúl di Blasio, Argentinian pianist, composer, and producer
- 1949 – Enzo Cucchi, Italian painter
- 1949 – Gary Grubbs, American actor
- 1949 – Ryo Hayami, Japanese actor
- 1949 – James Young, American singer-songwriter and guitarist
- 1951 – Stephen Bishop, American singer-songwriter and actor
- 1951 – Leszek Cichy, Polish mountaineer
- 1951 – Zhang Yimou, Chinese actor, director, producer, and cinematographer
- 1952 – Johnny A., American guitarist and songwriter
- 1952 – Dimitra Galani, Greek singer, composer and songwriter
- 1952 – Maggie Roswell, American voice actress and singer
- 1953 – Tim Bowler, English children's author
- 1953 – Dominique de Villepin, Moroccan-French lawyer and politician, 167th Prime Minister of France
- 1954 – Willie Hernández, Puerto Rican baseball player (died 2023)
- 1954 – Bernard Hinault, French cyclist
- 1954 – Condoleezza Rice, American political scientist, academic, and politician, 66th United States Secretary of State
- 1954 – Eliseo Salazar, Chilean race car driver
- 1954 – Yanni, Greek-American pianist, composer, and producer
- 1955 – Philip Egan, English bishop
- 1955 – Jack Sikma, American basketball player and coach
- 1956 – Babette Babich, American philosopher, author, and scholar
- 1956 – Avi Cohen, Israeli footballer and manager (died 2010)
- 1956 – Peter R. de Vries, Dutch investigative journalist and crime reporter (died 2021)
- 1956 – Valerie Jarrett, American government official
- 1959 – Paul Attanasio, American screenwriter and producer
- 1959 – Shafi Goldwasser, Israeli-American computer scientist, Turing Award Laureate
- 1959 – Paul McGann, English actor
- 1959 – Bryan Stevenson, American lawyer and author, founder and executive director of the Equal Justice Initiative
- 1961 – D. B. Sweeney, American actor
- 1962 – Laura San Giacomo, American actress
- 1962 – Harland Williams, Canadian-American actor and screenwriter
- 1963 – Stéphane Bern, French journalist, radio and television presenter
- 1964 – Bill Hemmer, American journalist
- 1964 – Silken Laumann, Canadian rower (Olympic bronze and silver medalist)
- 1964 – Joseph Simmons, American hip-hop artist
- 1964 – Patrick Warburton, American actor and comedian
- 1966 – Charles Hazlewood, English conductor
- 1966 – Petra Rossner, German cyclist
- 1967 – Nina Gordon, American singer-songwriter
- 1968 – Lionel Simmons, American basketball player
- 1969 – Butch Walker, American singer-songwriter, guitarist, and producer
- 1970 – Dana Stubblefield, American football player
- 1971 – Adam Gilchrist, Australian cricketer and sportscaster
- 1971 – Vikas Khanna, Indian chef and author
- 1971 – Marco Leonardi, Australian-Italian actor
- 1972 – Matt Bloom, American wrestler, trainer, and sportscaster
- 1972 – Josh Duhamel, American model and actor
- 1972 – Lara Giddings, Papua New Guinean-Australian politician, 44th Premier of Tasmania
- 1972 – Edyta Górniak, Polish singer
- 1972 – Dougie Payne, Scottish bass player
- 1972 – Martin Pike, Australian footballer and coach
- 1972 – Aaron Taylor, American football player and sportscaster
- 1972 – Dariusz Żuraw, Polish footballer and manager
- 1973 – Lawyer Milloy, American football player
- 1973 – Rubén Rivera, Panamanian baseball player
- 1973 – Andrew Strong, Irish singer and actor
- 1974 – Adina Howard, American singer-songwriter and chef
- 1974 – Sofie Merckx, Belgian politician
- 1974 – David Moscow, American actor
- 1974 – Joe Principe, American singer and bass player
- 1975 – Travis Barker, American drummer, songwriter, and producer
- 1975 – Stephen Guarino, American actor
- 1975 – Gary Vaynerchuk, Russian-American businessman and critic
- 1977 – Brian Dietzen, American actor
- 1977 – Obie Trice, American rapper and producer
- 1978 – Bobby Allen, American ice hockey player
- 1978 – Michala Banas, New Zealand actress and singer
- 1978 – Delphine Chanéac, French model and actress
- 1978 – Xavier Nady, American baseball player and coach
- 1979 – Carl Hayman, New Zealand rugby player
- 1979 – Mavie Hörbiger, German-Austrian actress
- 1979 – Olga Kurylenko, Ukrainian-French model and actress
- 1979 – Pushkar Lele, Indian singer
- 1979 – Moitheri Ntobo, Lesothan footballer
- 1979 – Miguel Sabah, Mexican footballer
- 1980 – Brock Pierce, American actor and businessman
- 1980 – Brooke Satchwell, Australian model and actress
- 1981 – Vanessa Bayer, American actress
- 1981 – Tom Ferrier, English race car driver
- 1981 – Russell Tovey, English actor
- 1982 – Boosie Badazz, American rapper
- 1982 – Hamdan bin Mohammed Al Maktoum, Crown Prince of Dubai
- 1982 – Kyle Orton, American football player
- 1982 – Joy Williams, American singer-songwriter
- 1983 – Guillermo Moscoso, American baseball player
- 1983 – Naqqash Tahir, English cricketer
- 1983 – Chelsea Wolfe, American singer-songwriter
- 1983 – Miriam Barnes, American sprinter and hurdler
- 1984 – Lisa De Vanna, Australian footballer
- 1984 – Courtney Johns, Australian footballer
- 1984 – Marija Šerifović, Serbian singer
- 1985 – Thomas Vermaelen, Belgian footballer
- 1986 – Kalisto, Mexican-American wrestler
- 1986 – Danielle Page, American-Serbian basketball player and coach
- 1986 – Cory Michael Smith, American actor
- 1987 – Giorgos Georgiadis, Greek footballer
- 1988 – Chiyotairyū Hidemasa, Japanese sumo wrestler
- 1988 – Nanase Hoshii, Japanese singer and actress
- 1989 – Vlad Chiricheș, Romanian footballer
- 1989 – T. Y. Hilton, American football player
- 1989 – Jake Livermore, English footballer
- 1989 – Stella Maeve, American actress
- 1990 – Roman Bürki, Swiss footballer
- 1990 – Jessica Jacobs, Australian actress and singer (died 2008)
- 1991 – Miriam Brouwer, Canadian cyclist
- 1991 – Taylor Hall, Canadian ice hockey player
- 1991 – Graham Patrick Martin, American actor
- 1991 – Thinzar Shunlei Yi, Burmese activist
- 1993 – Francisco Lindor, Puerto Rican baseball player
- 1993 – Shūhei Nomura, Japanese actor
- 1993 – Samuel Umtiti, French footballer
- 1996 – Borna Ćorić, Croatian tennis player
- 1996 – Dawson Knox, American football player
- 1997 – Noussair Mazraoui, Moroccan footballer
- 1997 – Christopher Nkunku, French footballer
- 1997 – Axel Tuanzebe, English-Congolese footballer
- 1998 – Sofia Kenin, American tennis player
- 1998 – DeVonta Smith, American football player
- 2000 – Xiyeon, South Korean singer and actress
- 2006 – Yan Diomande, Ivorian footballer

== Deaths ==
=== Pre-1600 ===
- 565 – Justinian I, Byzantine emperor (born 482)
- 669 – Fujiwara no Kamatari, Japanese politician (born 614)
- 940 – Abu'l-Fadl al-Bal'ami, Samanid vizier
- 976 – Taizu, Chinese emperor (born 927)
- 1060 – Geoffrey II, count of Anjou
- 1189 – William de Mandeville, 3rd Earl of Essex
- 1226 – Frederick of Isenberg, German politician (born 1193)
- 1263 – Alexander Nevsky, Russian saint (born 1220)
- 1346 – Ostasio I da Polenta, Lord of Ravenna
- 1359 – Gregory Palamas, Greek archbishop and saint (born 1296)
- 1391 – Nikola Tavelić, Croatian missionary and saint (born 1340)
- 1442 – Yolande of Aragon, French noblewoman (born 1384)
- 1522 – Anne of France, duchess of Bourbon (born 1461)
- 1539 – Hugh Faringdon, English monk and abbot
- 1556 – Giovanni della Casa, Italian archbishop and poet (born 1504)

=== 1601–1900 ===
- 1633 – William Ames, English philosopher and academic (born 1576)
- 1687 – Nell Gwyn, English mistress of Charles II of England (born 1650)
- 1691 – Tosa Mitsuoki, Japanese painter (born 1617)
- 1716 – Gottfried Leibniz, German mathematician and philosopher (born 1646)
- 1734 – Louise de Kérouaille, duchess of Portsmouth (born 1649)
- 1739 – Juan de Galavís, Spanish Roman Catholic archbishop of Santo Domingo and Bogotá (born 1683)
- 1746 – Georg Wilhelm Steller, German botanist, zoologist, physician, and explorer (born 1709)
- 1749 – Maruyama Gondazaemon, Japanese sumo wrestler, the 3rd Yokozuna (born 1713)
- 1817 – Policarpa Salavarrieta, Colombian seamstress and spy (born 1795)
- 1825 – Jean Paul, German journalist and author (born 1763)
- 1829 – Louis Nicolas Vauquelin, French pharmacist and chemist (born 1763)
- 1831 – Georg Wilhelm Friedrich Hegel, German philosopher, author, and academic (born 1770)
- 1831 – Ignaz Pleyel, Austrian-French composer and piano builder (born 1757)
- 1832 – Charles Carroll of Carrollton, American farmer and politician (born 1737)
- 1844 – John Abercrombie, Scottish physician and philosopher (born 1780)
- 1844 – Flora Tristan, French author and activist (born 1803)
- 1864 – Franz Müller, German tailor and murderer (born 1840)
- 1866 – Miguel I of Portugal (born 1802)

=== 1901–present ===
- 1907 – Andrew Inglis Clark, Australian lawyer, judge, and politician (born 1848)
- 1908 – Guangxu Emperor of China (born 1871)
- 1910 – John La Farge, American artist (born 1835)
- 1914 – Vengayil Kunhiraman Nayanar, Indian lawyer and journalist (born 1861)
- 1915 – Booker T. Washington, American educator, essayist and historian (born 1856)
- 1916 – Henry George, Jr., American journalist and politician (born 1862)
- 1916 – Saki, British short story writer (born 1870)
- 1918 – Matti Lonkainen, Finnish politician (born 1874)
- 1921 – Isabel, Princess Imperial of Brazil (born 1846)
- 1930 – Sandy Pearce, Australian rugby league player (born 1883)
- 1932 – Charles Hylton Stewart, English organist and composer (born 1884)
- 1937 – Jack O'Connor, American baseball player and manager (born 1866)
- 1939 – Bluey, Australian Cattle Dog, oldest verified dog (born 1910)
- 1944 – Carl Flesch, Hungarian violinist and educator (born 1873)
- 1944 – Trafford Leigh-Mallory, English air marshal (born 1892)
- 1946 – Manuel de Falla, Spanish pianist and composer (born 1876)
- 1947 – Joseph Allard, Canadian fiddler and composer (born 1873)
- 1966 – Peter Baker, English captain, author, and politician (born 1921)
- 1972 – Martin Dies, Jr., American lawyer and politician (born 1900)
- 1974 – Johnny Mack Brown, American football player, actor, and singer (born 1904)
- 1977 – A. C. Bhaktivedanta Swami Prabhupada, Indian monk and guru, founded the International Society for Krishna Consciousness (born 1896)
- 1981 – Robert Bradford, Irish footballer and politician (born 1941)
- 1984 – Cesar Climaco, Filipino lawyer and politician, 10th Mayor of Zamboanga City (born 1916)
- 1984 – Nikitas Platis, Greek actor and cinematographer (born 1912)
- 1988 – Haywood S. Hansell, American general (born 1903)
- 1989 – Jimmy Murphy, Welsh footballer, manager, assistant manager, coach, and scout (born 1910)
- 1990 – Sol Kaplan, American composer and conductor (born 1919)
- 1991 – Tony Richardson, English-American director, producer, and screenwriter (born 1928)
- 1992 – Ernst Happel, Austrian footballer and coach (born 1925)
- 1994 – Tom Villard, American actor (born 1953)
- 1995 – Jack Finney, American author and screenwriter (born 1911)
- 1996 – Joseph Bernardin, American cardinal (born 1928)
- 1996 – John A. Cade, American soldier and politician (born 1929)
- 1997 – Eddie Arcaro, American jockey and sportscaster (born 1916)
- 1997 – Jack Pickersgill, Canadian educator and politician, 35th Secretary of State for Canada (born 1905)
- 2000 – Robert Trout, American journalist (born 1908)
- 2001 – Charlotte Coleman, English actress (born 1968)
- 2001 – Juan Carlos Lorenzo, Argentinian footballer and manager (born 1922)
- 2002 – Eddie Bracken, American actor (born 1915)
- 2002 – Elena Nikolaidi, Greek-American soprano and educator (born 1909)
- 2003 – Gene Anthony Ray, American actor, singer, dancer, and choreographer (born 1962)
- 2004 – Michel Colombier, French-American composer and conductor (born 1939)
- 2006 – Sumner Shapiro, American admiral (born 1926)
- 2008 – Kristin Hunter, American author and academic (born 1931)
- 2008 – Robert E. Valett, American psychologist, teacher, and author (born 1927)
- 2010 – Wes Santee, American runner (born 1932)
- 2011 – Esin Afşar, Italian-Turkish singer and actress (born 1936)
- 2011 – Neil Heywood, English-Chinese businessman (born 1970)
- 2011 – Jackie Leven, Scottish singer-songwriter and guitarist (born 1950)
- 2012 – Alexandro Alves do Nascimento, Brazilian footballer (born 1974)
- 2012 – Brian Davies, Australian rugby player and manager (born 1930)
- 2012 – Martin Fay, Irish fiddler (born 1936)
- 2012 – Ahmed Jabari, Palestinian commander (born 1960)
- 2012 – Abubakar Olusola Saraki, Nigerian physician and politician (born 1933)
- 2013 – Sudhir Bhat, Indian producer and manager (born 1951)
- 2013 – Hari Krishna Devsare, Indian journalist and author (born 1938)
- 2013 – Bennett Masinga, South African footballer (born 1965)
- 2014 – Eugene Dynkin, Russian-American mathematician and theorist (born 1924)
- 2014 – Glen A. Larson, American director, producer, and screenwriter, created Battlestar Galactica (born 1937)
- 2014 – Morteza Pashaei, Iranian singer-songwriter (born 1984)
- 2015 – Nick Bockwinkel, American professional wrestler (born 1934)
- 2015 – K. S. Gopalakrishnan, Indian director, producer, and screenwriter (born 1929)
- 2015 – Warren Mitchell, English actor and screenwriter (born 1926)
- 2016 – Gwen Ifill, American television journalist (born 1955)
- 2020 – Peter Florjancic, Slovene inventor and Olympic athlete (born 1919)
- 2020 – Des O'Connor, English comedian, singer and television presenter (born 1932)
- 2024 – Vic Flick, English guitarist (born 1937)
- 2024 – Peter Sinfield, English songwriter and producer (born 1943)

== Holidays and observances ==
- Anniversary of the Movement of Readjustment (Guinea-Bissau)
- Children's Day (India), celebrated on the birthday of Jawaharlal Nehru
- Christian feast day:
  - Alberic I of Utrecht
  - All Saints of the Carmelites
  - All Souls of the Benedictine family
  - Barlaam of Kiev (Eastern Orthodox Church)
  - Dubricius (Dyfrig, or Devereux)
  - Hypatius of Gangra
  - Justinian I (Eastern Orthodox and Lutheran Church)
  - Laurence O'Toole
  - Nikola Tavelic
  - Philip the Apostle (Eastern Orthodox Church)
  - Samuel Seabury (Anglican Communion)
  - Serapion of Algiers
  - Sidonius (Saëns)
  - Venera (Veneranda)
  - November 14 (Eastern Orthodox liturgics)
- Day of the Colombian Woman (Colombia)
- Mobile Brigade Day (Indonesia)
- World Diabetes Day (International)
- Dobruja Day (Romania)
