= Lele River =

Lele River may refer to:

- Lélé River, a river in Cameroon
- Another name of Lakulaku River, a river in Taiwan
