= Swan (singer) =

South Korean singer (born 2003)

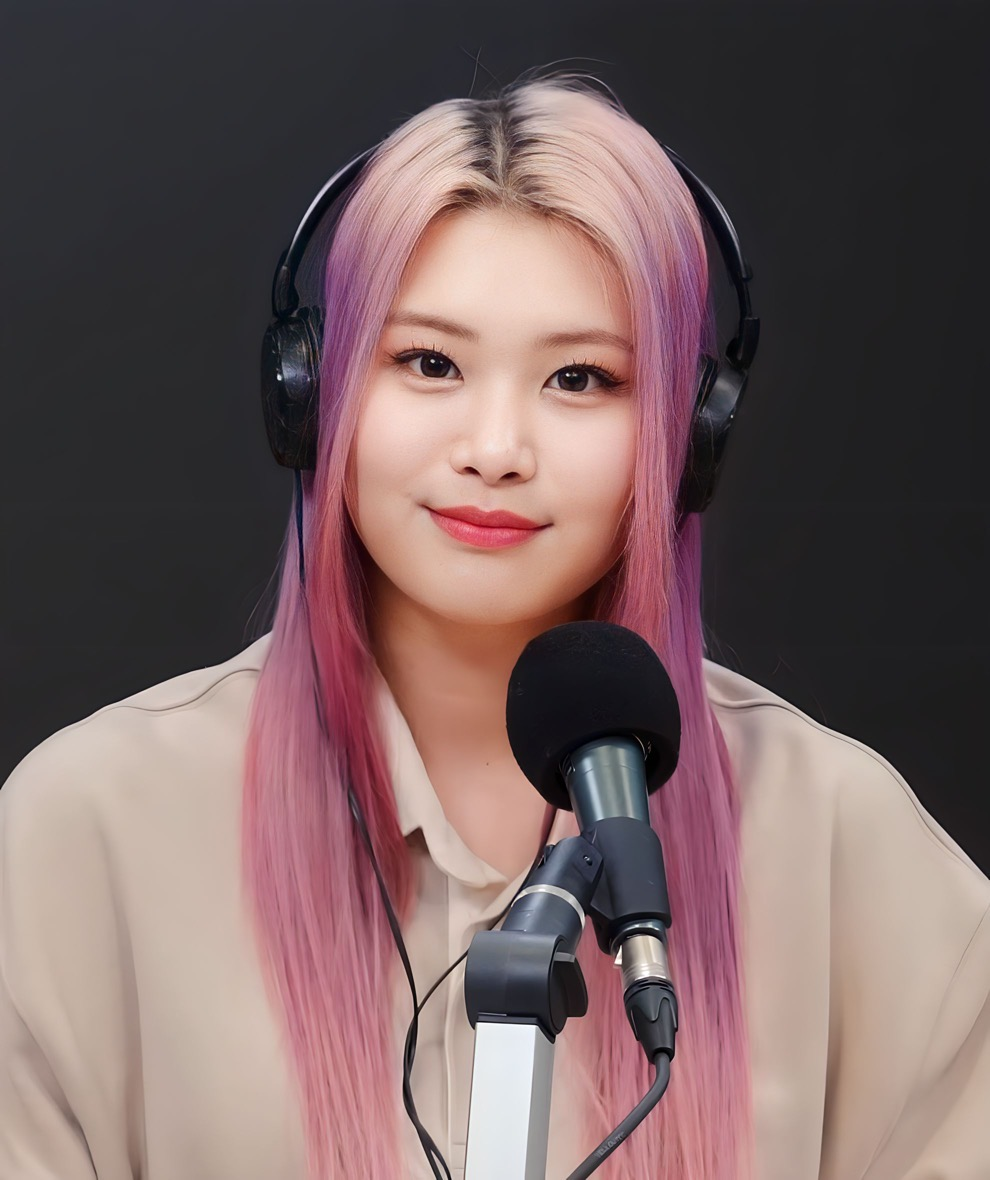
- Swan in 2023
- Born: Park Su-jin; July 11, 2003 (age 23); Yongin, Gyeonggi Province, South Korea
- Occupation: Singer
- Musical career
- Genres: K-pop
- Instrument: Vocals
- Years active: 2020–present
- Label: RBW
- Formerly of: Purple Kiss

Korean name
- Hangul: 박수진
- Hanja: 朴秀珍
- RR: Bak Sujin
- MR: Pak Sujin

Stage name
- Hangul: 수안
- RR: Suan
- MR: Suan

Signature
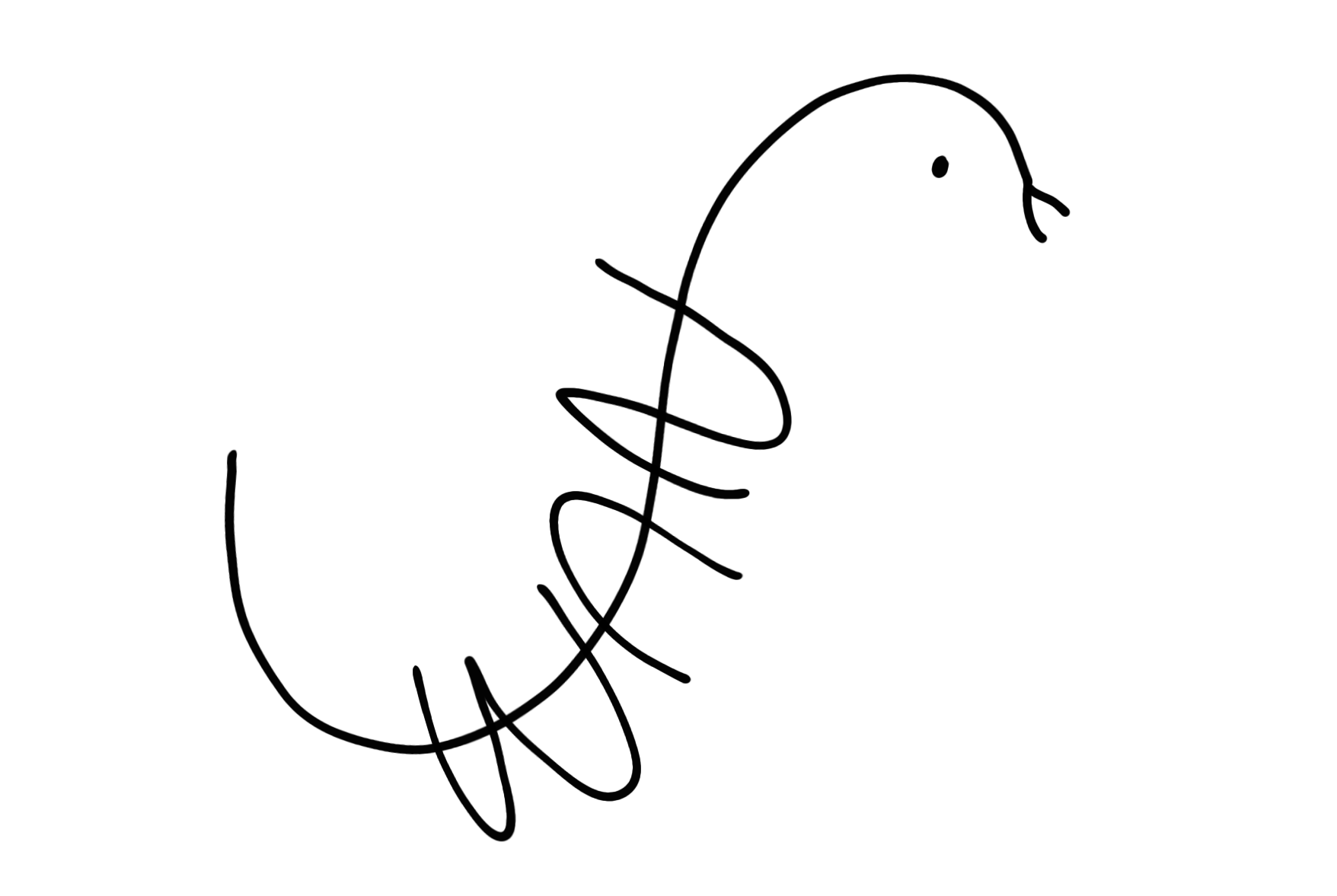

Park Su-jin (Korean: 박수진; born July 11, 2003), better known by her stage name Swan (Korean: 수안), is a South Korean singer. She was a member of South Korean girl group Purple Kiss until their disbandment in 2025. She made her solo debut with her debut single album Twenty, which was produced by Jung Key, on July 2, 2023.

== Career ==
=== Pre-debut ===
Swan did the guide version of Chungha's "Snapping" and participated in the chorus of the official release as the background vocals.

She has been an RBW trainee since 2017.

=== 2020–present: Debut with Purple Kiss ===
On July 23, 2020, Swan was confirmed to be a member of Purple Kiss with the release of her debut trailer on the group's YouTube channel. In September, she had a temporary hiatus for health reasons, making her unable to participate on the group's first pre-debut release, "My Heart Skip a Beat". RBW stated her return to the group on December 23.

=== 2022–present: Solo activities and solo debut with Twenty ===
On July 3, 2022, Swan was revealed as "Old Twisted Bread" on the second part of MBC singing competition program King of Mask Singer's 180th Generation Mask King episode when she lost at the third round, a round right before the final round. On September 17, she joined KBS music producer competition show Listen-Up as a mission singer for producer Jung Key. She lent her voice on a rearrangement of "Oh! What a Shiny Night", which was originally released by South Korean punk band Crying Nut in 2001. A day before, Swan, along with other 47 contestants, was revealed by Mnet as the lineup for its music survival show Artistock Game. She participated on the show until the eighth episode where she was eliminated, right before the semifinal round.

In the first quarter of 2023, Swan participated on KakaoTV virtual survival show Girls Reverse as Ruby, where her identity was revealed later when she got eliminated on the final episode and ended on the eighth place, failed to debut with the final group, Fe:verse. On June 20, RBW confirmed that Swan would make her debut as a solo artist in July with Jung Key, which had previously worked with her, as the producer of the release. Three days later, the format of her debut was revealed to be a single album with the title Twenty. On July 2, as the planned date, Swan officially debuted as a solo artist with the release of the single album and its music video of the lead single of the same name. She had her first music show performance on Mnet's M Countdown on July 6.

== Discography ==
=== Single albums ===
List of single albums, showing selected details, selected chart positions, and sales figures
Title	Details	Peak chart positions	Sales
Title	Details	KOR	Sales
Twenty	Released: July 2, 2023; Label: RBW; Formats: Cassette tape, digital download, streaming; Track listing: 1. "Twenty" (Prod. Jung Key); 2. "Be My Everything" (나를 비추면); 3. "Twenty (English ver.)" 4. "Be My Everything (English ver.)"	50	KOR: 2,637

=== Singles ===
List of singles, showing year released, chart positions, and album name
Title	Year	Peak chart positions	Album
Title	Year	KOR Down.	Album
"Twenty" (Prod. Jung Key)	2023	136	Twenty

=== Soundtrack appearances ===
List of soundtrack appearances, showing year released, and album name
Title	Year	Album
"Absently" (멍하니)	2021	School 2021 OST
"Burning"	2023	Divorce Attorney Shin OST

=== Compilation appearances ===
List of compilation appearances, showing year released, and album name
Title	Year	Album
"Oh! What a Shiny Night" (밤이 깊었네)	2022	Listen-Up Ep. 7
"Bling Bling" (블링블링)	2023	Immortal Songs: Singing the Legend (Kim Yon-ja)

=== Songwriting credits ===
All song credits are adapted from the Korea Music Copyright Association's database unless stated otherwise.

List of songs, showing year released, artist name, and name of the album
Title	Year	Artist(s)	Album	Lyricist	Composer
"Ponzona"	2021	Purple Kiss	Into Violet	Yes	Yes
"Period" (퍼펙트)	2021	Purple Kiss	Into Violet	Yes	Yes
"2am" (새벽2시)	2021	Purple Kiss	Hide & Seek	Yes	No
"Twenty"	2023	Herself	Twenty	Yes	No
"Be My Everything" (나를비추면)	2023	Herself	Twenty	Yes	No
"BBB"	2024	Purple Kiss	BXX	Yes	No
"On My Bike"	2024	Purple Kiss	Headway	Yes	No
"Light the Way"	2024	Purple Kiss	Headway	Yes	No
"Lost & Found"	2025	Purple Kiss	I Miss My...	Yes	No
"Breath"	2025	Purple Kiss	A Violet to Remember	Yes	No

== Filmography ==
=== Television shows ===
Year	Title	Role	Notes	Ref.
2022	King of Mask Singer	Contestant	As "Old Twisted Bread" (Episode 361–362)	
2022	Listen-Up	Mission singer	Performed Jung Key's arrangement of "Oh! What a Shiny Night"	
2022	Artistock Game	Contestant	Eliminated at the eight episode	
2023	Girls Reverse	Contestant	Finished at the eighth place at the final episode	
2023	Immortal Songs: Singing the Legend	Contestant	Performed "Bling Bling" by Kim Yon-ja (Episodes 589)	
