= Li Li =

Li Li may refer to:

== Sports ==
- Li Li (badminton) (born 1983), Chinese badminton player
- Li Li (gymnast) (born 1975), Chinese artistic gymnast
- Li Li (table tennis), table tennis player from China
- Li Li (tennis) (born 1976), Chinese tennis player

== Writing and literature ==
- Li Li (Water Margin), fictional character in the Water Margin
- Muzi Mei (born 1978), real name Li Li, Chinese blogger
- Li Li (poet and translator)
- Li Li (poet, born 1968)

== Other people ==
- Li Li (politician) (1908–2006), People's Republic of China politician
- Li Li, daughter of Li Yuru, the Peking opera star

== See also ==
- Li (disambiguation)
- Lili (disambiguation)
- Lee Lee (disambiguation)
- Lê Lợi, a Vietnamese equivalent of Li Li
