= Purple Kiss =

South Korean girl group

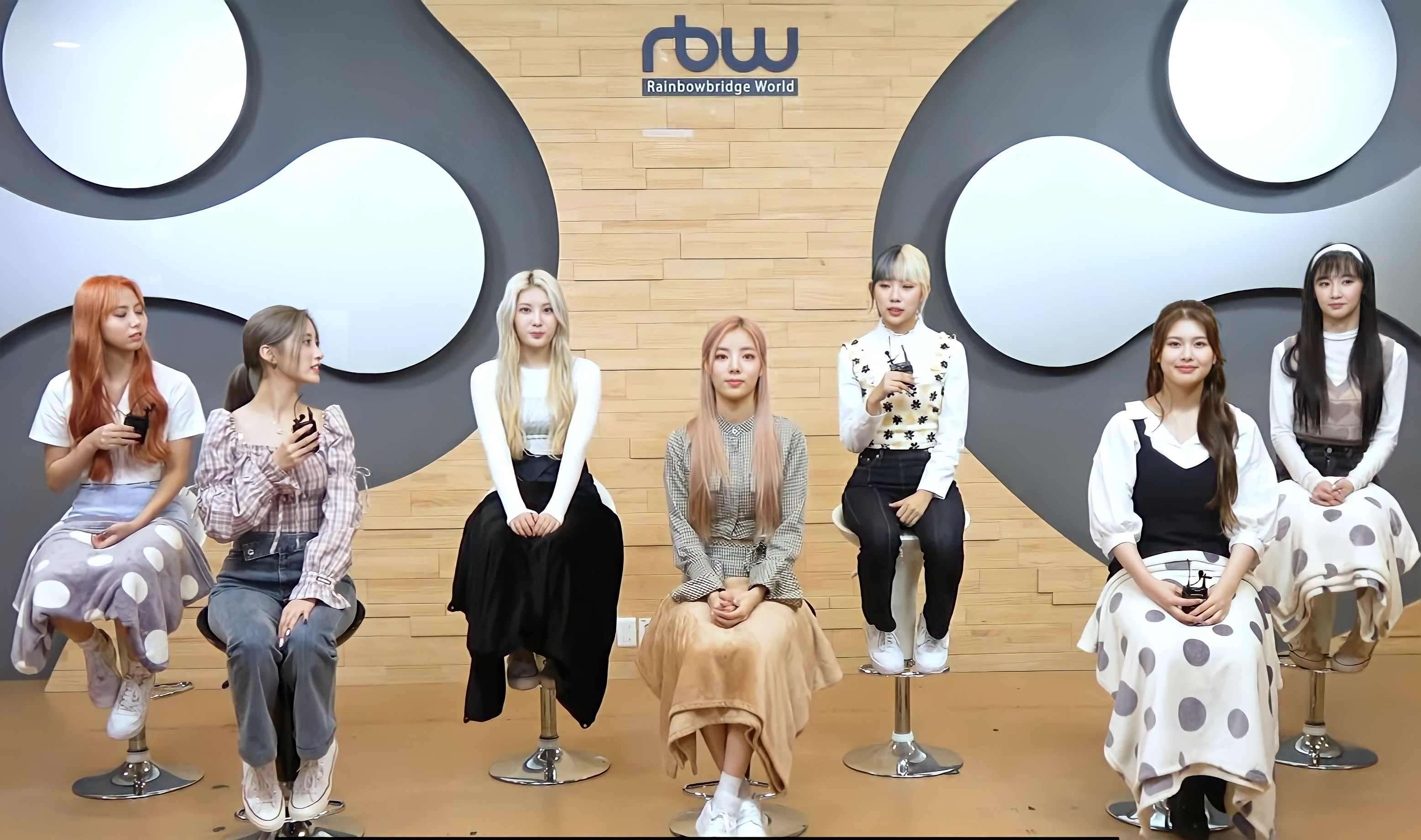
- Purple Kiss in October 2021; L–R: Ireh, Yuki, Chaein, Na Go-eun, Dosie, Swan, and Park Ji-eun

Background information
- Origin: Seoul, South Korea
- Genre: K-pop
- Years active: 2020–2025
- Labels: RBW; Victor
- Past members: Na Go-eun; Dosie; Ireh; Yuki; Chaein; Swan; Park Ji-eun
- Website: purplekiss.co.kr

Purple Kiss (Korean: 퍼플키스; stylized in all caps) was a South Korean girl group formed by RBW in 2020. The final lineup before disbanding consisted of six members: Na Go-eun, Dosie, Ireh, Yuki, Chaein and Swan. Purple Kiss was originally a seven-member group; Park Ji-eun left the group on November 18, 2022, due to health issues. They were considered to be a self-producing group, with members involved in songwriting, composing and other aspects of their music and showmanship.

The group released two pre-debut digital singles—"My Heart Skip a Beat" in November 2020, and "Can We Talk Again" in February 2021—before their official debut on March 15, 2021, with the EP Into Violet.

== Name ==
Purple Kiss' official logo

The group's name is a compound word: "purple" with the idea that the color is made through more than one color; and the word "kiss" symbolizing love. It imprints on the aspect of the diverse personalities of each member's musical color mixed in harmony, hence, the meaning of Purple Kiss is to "convey love through various colors of music."

== History ==
=== 2018–2021: 365 Practice and pre-debut activities ===
==== 365 Practice ====
Purple Kiss, then known as 365 Practice, began activities through an eponymous YouTube channel in March 2018, used by RBW to highlight their female trainees' daily lives, school activities, and practices. The channel introduced all seven future members of Purple Kiss, alongside other trainees who were not added to the final lineup.

During and prior to this period, multiple members appeared on various Korean reality shows and participated in other domestic activities. In 2011 and 2014, Chaein appeared on K-pop Star for seasons 1 and 3. In late 2017, Dosie competed on Mix Nine, ranking 74th. In June 2018, Park Ji-eun and Na Go-eun competed on Produce 48, placing 80th and 29th respectively.

On May 25, 2019, 365 Practice held their "All-Ways" mini-concert at RBW Art Hall to commemorate 100,000 YouTube subscribers. In July 2019, Swan recorded the guide vocals for "Snapping" by Chungha. On November 2, 2019, they accompanied Mamamoo's Moonbyul to perform for charity at the Seongdong Fashion Sewing Village Festival.

In their later trainee days, members participated music projects such as LunCHbox, with Dosie, Swan, and Go-eun joining the line-up of featured artists. Yuki and Lee Ye-sol, a former trainee, were featured in Hwang Sung-jin's album Hwang Sung Jin Project Secondary words Vol.2 on the track "Be With You." Go-eun recorded the single "Fly" for the soundtrack of the 2019 television series Possessed. On May 26, 2020, the entire group appeared as dancers in Onewe's "End of Spring" music video, alongside Oneus.

==== Formation of Purple Kiss and pre-debut singles ====
On June 19, 2020, a debut trailer was released on the 365 Practice channel, officially announcing the group's name as Purple Kiss. The final line-up—consisting of Park Ji-eun, Na Go-eun, Dosie, Ireh, Yuki, Chaein, and Swan—was revealed from July 20 to August 1 with individual music video trailers introducing each of the members, culminating in a group trailer on August 3, 2020.

Purple Kiss released their first pre-debut digital single, "My Heart Skip a Beat" on November 26, 2020. Swan did not participate in the single or its music video due to a temporary health-related hiatus. The song received positive attention from Korean media, and featured choreography created by the members as well as an original rap section written by Yuki. The group's second pre-debut single, "Can We Talk Again", was released on February 3, 2021, and featured all seven members. The single, a subdued R&B track, contrasted significantly with the rock-inspired "My Heart Skip a Beat", meant to showcase the group's musical versatility.

=== 2021: Introduction and debut with Into Violet and Hide & Seek ===
On February 28, Purple Kiss announced their debut, which would be the EP Into Violet. It was released on March 15. with the second track "Ponzona" serving as the EP's lead single with an accompanying music video. Into Violet peaked at number 11 on the Gaon Album Chart whilst "Ponzona" at number 99 on the Download Chart.

On September 8, Purple Kiss released their second EP Hide & Seek, with the lead single "Zombie". The lead single was co-written by Yuki, alongside labelmate CyA, with the group having writing and composing credits for most of the songs on the album.

On December 18, Purple Kiss released the winter digital single "My My".

=== 2022–2024: Park Jieun's departure, Cabin Fever, and debut US tour ===
On March 29, 2022, Purple Kiss released their third EP MemeM, with the lead single of the same name. On July 25, Purple Kiss released their fourth EP Geekyland, with the lead single "Nerdy". On November 18, RBW announced that Park Ji-eun had made the decision to leave the group due to her poor health condition and anxiety symptoms, making Purple Kiss a six-member group.

On February 15, 2023, Purple Kiss released their fifth EP Cabin Fever, with the lead single "Sweet Juice". The album debuted at number 18 on South Korea's Circle Album Chart with 18,290 sales and made it to the top 10 of the iTunes Top Albums chart in 16 regions, including the United States. On March 22, Purple Kiss made their Japanese debut with the EP Dear Violet, which included Japanese versions of their previous singles. On March 21 and March 26, the group held their solo concert "Purple Kiss 1st Live Japan" in Osaka and Tokyo. On April 27, it was announced that member Yuki would be participating in the Mnet survival show Queendom Puzzle, where she eventually placed 3rd overall, debuting in the group El7z Up. On August 16, Purple Kiss released the logo motion teaser for their first single album Festa. On September 2, Purple Kiss announced their first tour, 2023 The Festa Tour in USA.

=== 2024–2025: BXX, I Miss My..., Our Now, and disbandment ===
On March 19, 2024, Purple Kiss released their sixth extended play BXX with title track "BBB". On October 22, 2024, Purple Kiss released their seventh EP Headway with title track "On My Bike". On July 16, 2025, Purple Kiss released their second single album, I Miss My… with title track "DoReMi." On August 31, 2025, the band released their only English studio album, Our Now. The band is scheduled to disband in November 2025 following the release of an English album in August and activities in Japan, the United States, Taiwan, and Seoul. Their final digital single "Breath" was released on November 16.

== Members ==
=== Final line-up ===
- Na Go-eun (나고은) – vocalist, dancer
- Dosie (도시) – dancer, vocalist
- Ireh (이레) – dancer, vocalist
- Yuki (유키) – rapper, dancer
- Chaein (채인) – vocalist, dancer, rapper
- Swan (수안) – vocalist

=== Former ===
- Park Ji-eun (박지은) – vocalist

== Discography ==
=== Extended plays ===
Title	Details	Peak chart positions		Sales
Title	Details	KOR	JPN	Sales
Into Violet	Released: March 15, 2021; Label: RBW; Formats: CD, digital download, streaming; Track listing: 1. "Intro: Crown"; 2. "Ponzona"; 3. "Can We Talk Again"; 4. "Skip Skip'"; 5. "Hello"; 6. "My Heart Skip a Beat"; 7. "Period" (마침표)	11	—	KOR: 29,985
Hide & Seek	Released: September 8, 2021; Label: RBW; Formats: CD, digital download, streaming; Track listing: 1. "Zombie"; 2. "2am" (새벽 2시); 3. "Cast pearls before swine" (돼지 목에 진주 목걸이); 4. "So WhY'"; 5. "Twinkle" (눈물과 보석, 별 그리고 너); 6. "ZzZz"	5	—	KOR: 43,924
MemeM	Released: March 29, 2022; Label: RBW; Formats: CD, digital download, streaming; Track listing: 1. "Intro: Illusion"; 2. "memeM" (맴맴); 3. "Oh My Gosh" (날 좀 봐); 4. "Pretty Psycho'"; 5. "JOAH" (좋아); 6. "Hate Me, Hurt Me, Love Me"; 7. "Cursor" (빈틈)	7	—	KOR: 36,140
Geekyland	Released: July 25, 2022; Label: RBW; Formats: CD, digital download, streaming; Track listing: 1. "Intro: Bye Bye Bully"; 2. "Nerdy"; 3. "FireFlower" (불꽃); 4. "Can't Stop Dreamin'"; 5. "Love Is Dead"; 6. "Summer Rain"	7	—	KOR: 38,502
Cabin Fever	Released: February 15, 2023; Label: RBW; Formats: CD, digital download, streaming; Track listing: 1. "Intro: Save Me"; 2. "Sweet Juice"; 3. "T4ke"; 4. "Autopilot"; 5. "Agit" (아지트); 6. "So Far So Good"	18	—	KOR: 26,527
BXX	Released: March 19, 2024; Label: RBW; Formats: CD, digital download, streaming; Track listing: 1. "Intro: Crush"; 2. "BBB"; 3. "Bitter Sweet"; 4. "Toy Boy"; 5. "Heart Attack"; 6. "Voyager"	13	—	KOR: 28,317
Headway	Released: October 22, 2024; Label: RBW; Formats: CD, digital download, streaming; Track listing: 1. "Intro: Concrete Jungle"; 2. "On My Bike"; 3. "Sweet Nightmare"; 4. "Encore"; 5. "Light the Way"	17	—	KOR: 27,455
Our Now	Released: August 31, 2025; Label: RBW; Formats: CD, digital download, streaming; Track listing: 1. "DoReMi" (English ver.); 2. "Want U Back"; 3. "Unhappily Ever After"; 4. "Ponzona" (English ver.); 5. "Zombie" (English ver.); 6. "MemeM" (English ver.); 7. "Sweet Juice" (English ver.); 8. "7Heaven" (English ver.)	19	—	KOR: 11,194
Japanese
Dear Violet	Released: March 22, 2023; Label: Victor Entertainment; Formats: CD, digital download, streaming; Track listing: 1. "Sweet Juice" (Japanese ver.); 2. "Nerdy" (Japanese ver.); 3. "MemeM" (Japanese ver.); 4. "Tonari" (トナリ); 5. "Zombie" (Japanese ver.); 6. "Ponzona" (Japanese ver.)	—	12	JPN: 4,856
On the Violet	Released: July 17, 2024; Label: Victor Entertainment; Formats: CD, digital download, streaming; Track listing: 1. "BBB" (Japanese ver.); 2. "Pretty Psycho" (Japanese ver.); 3. "7Heaven" (Japanese ver.); 4. "So Far So Good" (Japanese ver.)	—	19	JPN: 2,314

=== Single albums ===
Title	Details	Peak chart positions	Sales
Title	Details	KOR	Sales
Festa	Released: September 5, 2023; Label: RBW; Formats: CD, digital download, streaming; Track listing: 1. "7Heaven"; 2. "Biscuit"; 3. "Mistake"	13	KOR: 34,738
I Miss My...	Released: July 16, 2025; Label: RBW; Formats: CD, digital download, streaming; Track listing: 1. "DoReMi"; 2. "Lost & Found"; 3. "VVV"	22	KOR: 27,708

=== Singles ===
Title	Year	Peak chart positions	Album
Title	Year	KOR Down.	Album
"My Heart Skip a Beat"	2020	—	Into Violet
"Can We Talk Again"	2021	—	Into Violet
"Ponzona"	2021	99	Into Violet
"Zombie"	2021	89	Hide & Seek
"My My"	2021	—	Non-album single
"MemeM" (맴맴)	2022	118	MemeM
"Nerdy"	2022	63	Geekyland
"Sweet Juice"	2023	27	Cabin Fever
"7Heaven"	2023	66	Festa
"BBB"	2024	57	BXX
"On My Bike"	2024	71	Headway
"Doremi"	2025	67	I Miss My...
"—" denotes a recording that did not chart or was not released in that territory

=== Collaborations ===
Title	Year	Album
"Find You" (with Lulupop)	2021	Non-album single

=== Other charted songs ===
Title	Year	Peak chart positions	Album
Title	Year	KOR Down.	Album
"Love Is Dead"	2022	194	Geekyland
"Summer Rain"	2022	152	Geekyland
"Autopilot"	2023	135	Cabin Fever
"Agit"	2023	163	Cabin Fever
"T4ke"	2023	171	Cabin Fever
"So Far So Good"	2023	177	Cabin Fever
"Mistake"	2023	173	Festa
"Biscuit"	2023	180	Festa
"Bitter Sweet"	2024	126	BXX
"Voyager"	2024	128	BXX
"Toy Boy"	2024	130	BXX
"Heart Attack"	2024	134	BXX
"Intro : Crush"	2024	181	BXX

== Videography ==
=== Music videos ===
Year	Title	Director	Ref.
2020	"My Heart Skip a Beat"	Zanybros	
2021	"Can We Talk Again"	Zanybros	
2021	"Ponzona"	Zanybros	
2021	"Zombie"	Zanybros	
2021	"My My"	SunnyVisual	
2022	"MemeM"	Zanybros	
2022	"Nerdy"	Zanybros	
2023	"Sweet Juice"	Zanybros	
2023	"7Heaven"	Zanybros	
2024	"BBB"	Milpowder	
2024	"On My Bike"	Hong Soo-min (Vidiworks)	
2025	"Doremi"	Kisuk Lee, Doyun Kim (LayerZ)	
2025	"Doremi" English Version	Kisuk Lee, Doyun Kim (LayerZ)	
2025	"Breath"	Unknown	

== Filmography ==
=== Reality shows ===
Year	Title	Ref.
2021	Literally Purple Kiss	
2021	Perky Holiday	

== Awards and nominations ==
Name of the award ceremony, year presented, category, nominee of the award, and the result of the nomination
Award ceremony	Year	Category	Nominee / Work	Result	Ref.
Asia Artist Awards	2021	Female Idol Popularity Award	Purple Kiss	Nominated	
Asian Pop Music Awards (Note: Hosted by the Hong Kong Asia Pacific International Group and Sunway Records, the Asian Pop Music Awards bases its winners on "Asian Pop Music Chart" which opened in September 2019.)	2020	Best New Artist (Overseas)	Purple Kiss	Nominated	
Brand of the Year Awards	2021	Female Rookie Idol Award	Purple Kiss	Nominated	
Golden Disc Awards	2022	Rookie Artist of the Year	Purple Kiss	Nominated	
Golden Disc Awards	2022	Seezn Most Popular Artist Award	Purple Kiss	Nominated	
Hallyu Influencer Grand Prize Awards (Note: The 2022 Hallyu Influencer Awards (planned/directed by Lee Ail) held at the large studio on the 1st floor of the Ilsan Bitmaru Broadcasting Center on June 1 was hosted by JGMC and hosted by Payton Foundation and HR Entertainment, OBS Kyungin TV, bntnews, It was held with the official support of Kukje News and Reborn Nature.)	2022	(World) K-POP Girl Group	Purple Kiss	Won	
Hanteo Music Awards	2021	Rookie Award – Female Group	Purple Kiss	Nominated	
Newsis K-EXPO Cultural Awards (Note: Co-sponsored by Korea's Ministry of Culture, Sports and Tourism, Ministry of Trade, Industry, and Energy, Korea Communications Commission, and Korea Creative Content Agency, it awards cultural icons and businesses who have contributed greatly to Hallyu, the Korean wave.)	2022	Next Generation Hallyu Star Award	Purple Kiss	Won	
Seoul Music Awards	2022	Rookie of the Year	Purple Kiss	Nominated	
Seoul Music Awards	2022	Popularity Award	Purple Kiss	Nominated	
Seoul Music Awards	2022	K-wave Popularity Award	Purple Kiss	Nominated	

=== Listicles ===
Name of publisher, year listed, name of listicle, and placement
Publisher	Year	Listicle	Placement	Ref.
Rolling Stone India	2021	10 Best K-pop Debuts of 2021	3rd	
