= Lelu =

Lelu may refer to:

- Lelu, Federated States of Micronesia, municipality of the state of Kosrae
  - Lelu Island, small island in Lelu municipality
- Lelu Island (British Columbia), Canada
- Lelu, Estonia, village in Käina Parish, Hiiu County, Estonia
- Lelu (album), a 2015 album by Sanni

== See also ==
- Lele (disambiguation)
