= Leelee Chan =

Contemporary mixed-media artist

Pallet in Repose (Portal), 2019, is a mixed media installation by Leelee Chan that demonstrates her use of painting, collage, and sculpture as well as her use of found and recycled materials, including wood pallets, foam packing materials, and magazine pages, to create works that illustrate her interest in material culture.

Leelee Chan (Chinese: 陳麗同, born 1984) is a Hong Kong–based contemporary mixed-media artist and sculptor. Her collages, paintings, sculptures, and installations combine natural and organic forms with recycled materials and found objects as an exploration of material culture.

== Early life and education ==
Born in Hong Kong, Chan grew up in Kwai Fong before attending community college in Utah, United States. She received a BFA in Painting from the School of the Art Institute of Chicago in 2006, followed by an MFA in Painting from the Rhode Island School of Design (RISD) in 2009. Through formally trained as a painter, during her studies at RISD, Chan began to explore working with mixed media and sculpture.

== Exhibitions and collections ==
Chan has exhibited locally and internationally, including at the Hong Kong Museum of Art, UCCA Center for Contemporary Art, ARCOmadrid, Art Basel Hong Kong, Capsule Shanghai, and Berlin Art Week. Additionally, her work is featured in a number of public and private art collections around the world, including those of the M+ Museum, JPMorgan Chase Art Collection, Kadist Art Foundation, and Skulpturen Park Köln.

== Recognition ==
In 2020, Chan was awarded the 9th BMW Art Journey, sponsored by Art Basel and BMW. As part of her funded research for this award, she traveled throughout Italy, France, Switzerland, Germany, and Mexico to learn about traditional crafts and sustainable materials from artisans, scientists, and manufacturers. She was named a "Woman of Power" by Prestige Hong Kong in 2022.
