= Leo Lee (disambiguation) =

Leo Lee may refer to:

- Leo Lee (born 2002), Australian singer and member of South Korean boy band Alpha Drive One
- Leo Lee Tung-hai (1921–2010), Hong Kong businessman
- Leo Ou-fan Lee (born 1942), Chinese academic
