= Into Violet =

- Digital cover

EP by Purple Kiss
- Released: March 15, 2021
- Recorded: 2020–2021
- Studio: RBW
- Genres: Dance; R&B; rock
- Length: 20:32
- Labels: RBW; Kakao
- Producers: Kim Do-hoon; Davve; Kang Ji-won

Purple Kiss chronology
Into Violet (2021)	Hide & Seek (2021)

Singles from Into Violet
- 1. "My Heart Skip a Beat" Released: November 26, 2020; 2. "Can We Talk Again" Released: February 3, 2021; 3. "Ponzona" Released: March 15, 2021

Into Violet is the debut EP by South Korean girl group Purple Kiss. It was released on 15 March 2021 by RBW and Kakao Entertainment. The EP consists of seven tracks with "Ponzona" serving as the lead single. It also contains their two previously released tracks, "My Heart Skip a Beat" and "Can We Talk Again".

== Background ==
The ensemble was first introduced to the public by the entertainment company RBW under the tentative name "365 Practice". And it was announced that Purple Kiss is set to make their debut in early March 2021. After formally introducing the group one by one, On November 26, 2020, the group released their first pre-debut digital single, "My Heart Skip a Beat". Due to a temporary health issue, Swan was unable to participate in the single or its music video. The song was well-received by the Korean press, and it contained choreography designed by the members. Yuki also wrote an original rap portion for the song. "Can We Talk Again," the group's second pre-debut song, was released on February 3, 2021, and included all seven members. The single, a somber R&B number, was in stark contrast to the Rock-inspired "My Heart Skip a Beat," which was intended to demonstrate the group's stylistic diversity.

== Composition ==
The album consists of 7 tracks. The title song "Ponzona" is a song that means 'poison' in the Spanish language, and it expresses the aspiration of the Purple Kiss to color the world with their charms. Other six songs include a 39-second intro titled "Intro:Crown", "Skip Skip", which rejects judging oneself prematurely with witty lyrics, "Hello", a melody to say goodbye to someone far away, "Period", a self-produced track of Purple Kiss, and the previously released singles "My Heart Skip a Beat" and "Can We Talk Again".

== Promotions ==
The group had a showcase at Yes24 Live Hall in Gwanjang-dong, Gwangjin-gu, Seoul on the afternoon of the 15th to communicate with fans and introduce the extended play, where they performed both "Ponzona" and "Skip Skip", a b side track.

== Commercial performance ==
"Ponzona" did not enter the Gaon Digital Chart but debuted and peaked at number 99 on the Gaon Download Chart. The album recorded 29,985 sales on the month of April, and peaked at number 11 on the 12th week of 2021.

== Track listing ==
Into Violet track listing
No.	Title	Lyrics	Music	Arrangement	Length
1.	"Intro: Crown"	Kang Jiwon	Kang Jiwon	Kang Jiwon	0:39
2.	"Ponzona"	Kang Jiwon; Na Go-eun; Swan	Kang Jiwon; Na Go-eun; Swan	Kang Jiwon	3:12
3.	"Can We Talk Again"	Kim Do-hoon; Kang Ji-won; Yuki; Chae-in	Kim Do-hoon; Kang Ji-won; Davve; Chae-in	Kim Do-hoon; Kang Ji -won	3:04
4.	"Skip Skip"	Kang Jiwon; Na Go-eun; Yuki	Kang Jiwon; Na Go-eun; Chaein	Kang Jiwon	3:23
5.	"Hello"	Kang Jiwon; Yuki	Kang Jiwon; Davve; Hongrim Jung	Kang Jiwon	3:22
6.	"My Heart Skip a Beat"	Seo Yong-bae; Lee Hu-sang; Yuki	Seo Yong-bae; Lee Hu-sang	Seo Yong-bae; Lee Lee Sang	3:17
7.	"Period" (퍼펙트)	Purple Kiss	Davve; Hong-rim Jung; Purple Kiss	Kang Jiwon; Hong-rim Jung; $up	3:35
Total length:					20:32

== Charts ==
Weekly chart performance for Into Violet
Chart (2021)	Peak position
South Korean Albums (Gaon)	11

== Release history ==
Release history for Into Violet
Region	Date	Format	Label
Various	March 15, 2021	Digital download; streaming	RBW; Kakao
South Korea	March 15, 2021	CD	RBW; Kakao
