= MemeM =

- Digital cover

EP by Purple Kiss
- Released: March 29, 2022
- Studio: RBW Studio
- Genre: Trap; R&B; Dance
- Length: 20:19
- Language: Korean
- Label: RBW; Kakao
- Producer: Kim Jin-woo; Kim Do-hoon (exec.)

Purple Kiss chronology
Hide & Seek (2021)	MemeM (2022)	Geekyland (2022)

Singles from MemeM
- 1. "MemeM" Released: March 29, 2022

MemeM (stylized as memeM) is the third EP by South Korean girl group Purple Kiss. It was released on March 29, 2022, by RBW. The album includes 7 tracks with "memeM" released as the title track. The 4th b-side track of the album titled "Pretty Psycho" was also used to promote the release. The physical album comes in two versions as Meme and M.

== Background and release ==
On March 8, 2022, RBW announced Purple Kiss would be releasing a new album in post March 2022, and through a logo motion video the title was revealed to be MemeM. On March 20, the music video teaser for lead single "memeM" was released. 4 days later, the highlight medley video teaser, together with the track listing, was released. The album was released on March 29.

== Composition ==
The title song "MemeM", which shares the same name as the album, was written by Kim Do-hoon, Seo Yong-bae, Lee Hu-sang and Kang Ji-won. It was composed in the key of B major, with a tempo of 150 beats per minute. Other tracks include "Intro: Illusion", "Oh My Gosh", a pop R&B track, "Pretty Psycho" which is sampled from "Intro: Freaky Purky" from their second EP Hide & Seek, "Joah", a R&B track, "Hate Me, Hurt Me, Love Me", and "Cursor", a down tempo track.

== Promotion ==
After 6 days of release, on April 4, 2022, they held a live media showcase in Ilji Art Hall, Gangnam-gu, Seoul to introduce the EP. It was scheduled to be held on the same day, but as 3 members tested positive for COVID-19, all promotional activities were postponed for one week.

== Commercial performance ==
The EP debuted at number 7 on South Korean's Gaon Album Chart in the chart issue dated March 27–April 2, 2022; on the monthly chart, the EP debuted at number 24 in the chart issue dated March 2022 with 36,140 copies sold. On South Korean Hanteo Charts it was recorded that the album sales on the first day are tripled with this release, selling more than 23,000 copies on first day.

== Critical reception ==
In addition, Pretty Psycho has been listed as one of the '25 Best K-Pop B-Sides of 2022' by Genius. Genius stated "The falsettos and the infectious bassline make it a solid b-side worthy of being a title track."

=== Year-end lists ===
Critic/publication	List	Track	Rank	Ref.
Genius	25 Best K-Pop B-Sides of 2022	"Pretty Psycho"	4	

== Track listing ==
Track listing for MemeM
No.	Title	Lyrics	Music	Arrangement	Length
1.	"Intro: Illusion"	Kang Ji-won	Kang Ji-won; Minkey	Minkey	1:07
2.	"MemeM" (Korean: 맴맴)	Kwon Mi-Yeon; Kang Ji-won; Seo Yong-bae; Lee Hoo-sang; Yuki	Kim Do-hoon; Kang Ji-won; Seo Yong-bae; Lee Lee Sang	Lee Hoo-sang	2:52
3.	"Oh My Gosh" (Korean: 날좀봐; RR: Naljombwa; lit. 'Look at me')	Chaein; Cosmic Girl; Cosmic Sound	Chaein; Cosmic Girl; Cosmic Sound	Cosmic Girl; Cosmic Sound	3:22
4.	"Pretty Psycho"	Kim Do-hoon; Kang Ji-won; Na Go-eun; Yuki	Kim Do-hoon; Kang Ji-won	Kang Jiwon	3:10
5.	"Joah" (Korean: 좋아; lit. 'Good')	Chaein	Chaein; Davve	Davve (RBW); Yoon Young-jun; Lee Joo-yong	3:15
6.	"Hate Me, Hurt Me, Love Me"	Davve (RBW); Seo Yong-bae (RBW); Lee Hoo-sang (RBW); Minkey	Davve (RBW); Seo Yong-bae (RBW); Lee Hoo-sang (RBW); Minkey; Yuki	Lee Lee Sang (RBW); Minkey	3:26
7.	"Cursor" (Korean: 빈틈; RR: Binteum; lit. 'Gap')	Chaein; Yuki	Davve; Chaein	Davve (RBW); Lee Joo-yong; Kwon Seok-hong (RBW); Shim Woon-seop	3:24
Total length:					20:19

== Personnel ==
=== Studios ===
- RBW Studios – recording, digital editing, audio mixing
- 821Sound Mastering – mastering

=== Personnel ===
- Purple Kiss (Park Ji-eun, Na Go-eun, Dosie, Ireh, Yuki, Chaein, Swan) – vocals
- Kim Do-hoon – production, direction
- Davve – production, direction, recording
- Kang Ji-won – production, direction, bass, piano, synthesizer, drum programming, recording, mixing
- Kanghyun – guitar
- Kim Tae-su – guitar
- Lee Hoo-sang – bass, piano, drum programming
- Lee Beam-su– bass
- Kim Min-ki – piano, keyboard, synthesizer, drum programming, recording
- Kim Ji-eun – piano, electronic piano
- Cosmic Sound – keyboard, chorus
- Yoon Young-joon – keyboard
- Lee Lee Sang – synthesizer
- Perrie – chorus
- Seo Yong-bae – recording
- Jo Eun-ju – recording
- Kang Roy – recording
- Yoo Sang-ho – mixing
- Uncle Jo – mixing
- Shin – mixing
- Master Key – mixing
- Kwon Nam-woo – mastering

== Charts ==
=== Weekly charts ===
Weekly chart performance for memeM
Chart (2022)	Peak position
South Korean Albums (Gaon)	7

=== Monthly charts ===
Monthly chart performance for memeM
Chart (2022)	Peak position
South Korean Albums (Gaon)	24

== Sales ==
Region	Certification	Certified units/sales
South Korea	—	36,140

== Release history ==
Release history for "memeM"
Region	Date	Format	Label
Various	March 29, 2022	Digital download; streaming	RBW; Kakao
