= List of songs written by Jackson Wang =

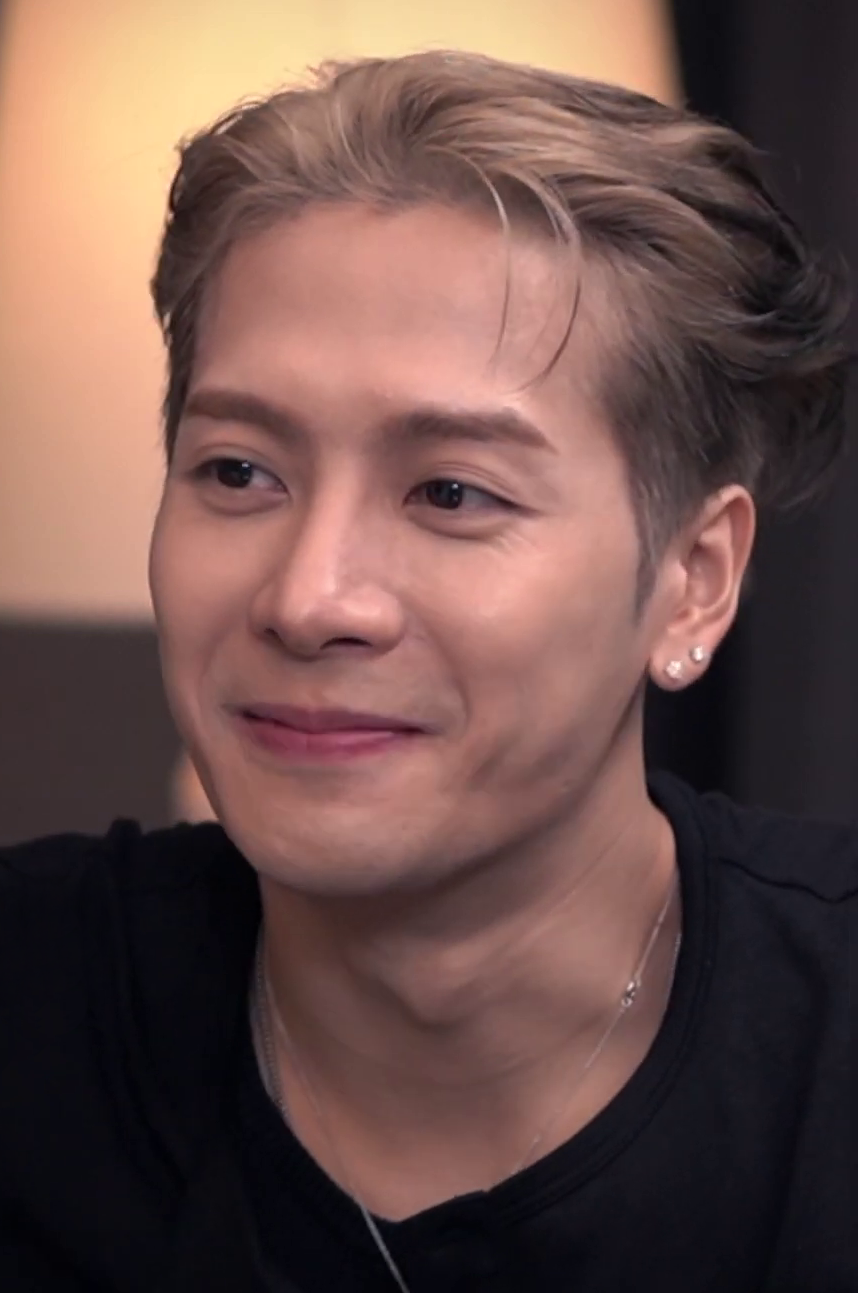
Wang in 2025

Jackson Wang (Chinese: 王嘉爾; Korean: 왕잭슨; born Wang Ka-yee on March 28, 1994) is a Hong Kong rapper. He is a member of the South Korean boy band Got7, formed by JYP Entertainment, and the founder of record label Team Wang, where he serves as the creative director and lead designer for its subsidiary fashion brand Team Wang Design.

== Songs ==
All song credits are adapted from the Korea Music Copyright Association's database, unless otherwise noted.

=== 2014–2018 ===
Year	Artist	Title	Album	Lyrics		Music	
Year	Artist	Title	Album	Credited	With	Credited	With
2014	Got7	"Just Tonight" (그냥 오늘 밤)	Identify	Yes	Ryan Im	No	—N/a
2015	Jackson Wang	"Donkey S" (당나귀 S)	Non-album single	Yes	—N/a	Yes	—N/a
2015	Got7	"Back To Me"	Just Right	Yes	Yoon Jong-sung, Jang Jung-seok (Sum People), Mark	No	—N/a
2015	Got7	"Feelin' Good" (느낌이 좋아)	Mad	Yes	Chloe, Noday, Mark	No	—N/a
2015	Got7	"Good"	Mad	Yes	E.One, Lee Mansung, Mark	No	—N/a
2015	Got7	"Tic Tic Tok"	Mad	Yes	Chloe, Noday	No	—N/a
2016	JYP Nation	"Encore"	Non-album single	Yes	Yubin, Hyerim, Yugyeom, J.Y. Park "The Asiansoul"	No	—N/a
2016	Got7	"Feel My Vibe"	Got7 1st concert Fly in Seoul Finale	Yes	BamBam, Boytoy	Yes	Boytoy
2016	Got7	"Boom x3"	Flight Log: Turbulence	Yes	Boytoy, Penomeco	Yes	Boytoy
2016	Got7	"No Jam" (노잼)	Flight Log: Turbulence	Yes	Yugyeom, Mark, Frants, BamBam	No	—N/a
2016	Got7	"Sick" (아파)	Flight Log: Turbulence	Yes	Ars (Youngjae), Mark	No	—N/a
2017	Got7	"Shopping Mall"	Flight Log: Arrival	Yes	Earattack, Defsoul (JB)	Yes	Earattack, 5$
2017	Got7	"Go Higher"	Flight Log: Arrival	Yes	Earattack, Defsoul (JB), Mark, BamBam	No	—N/a
2017	Got7	"Out"	Flight Log: Arrival	Yes	Boytoy, Wizil	Yes	Boytoy
2017	Jackson Wang	"Go Fridge" (拜托了冰箱)	Non-album singles	Yes	—N/a	Yes	Boytoy
2017	Jackson Wang	"Generation 2"	Non-album singles	Yes	—N/a	Yes	Boytoy
2017	Jackson Wang	"Papillon"	Non-album singles	Yes	—N/a	Yes	Boytoy
2017	JB, Jackson Wang	"U&I"	The Package OST	Yes	Earattack	No	—N/a
2017	Got7	"Face"	7 for 7	Yes	Lee Woomin, Mayu Wakisaka, Mark, BamBam	No	—N/a
2017	Jackson Wang	"Vision"	Non-album singles	Yes	—N/a	Yes	Boytoy
2017	Jackson Wang	"Okay"	Non-album singles	Yes	Boytoy	Yes	Boytoy
2018	Jackson Wang	"X"	Non-album singles	Yes	—N/a	Yes	Boytoy
2018	Jackson Wang	"Dawn of Us"	Non-album singles	Yes	Boytoy	Yes	Boytoy
2018	Tia Ray	"Lucky Rain" (feat. Jackson Wang)	Tiara	Yes	(rap part only)	No	—N/a
2018	Eddie Supa, Jackson Wang, Stan Sono	"Can't Breathe"	B2 Music & Vibe Presents: Urban Asia Vol. 1	Yes	Eddie Supa, Stan Sono	No	—N/a
2018	Jackson Wang	"Fendiman"	Non-album singles	Yes	Boytoy	Yes	Boytoy
2018	Al Rocco, Jackson Wang	"Bruce Lee"	Non-album singles	Yes	Al Rocco	Yes	Al Rocco
2018	Sammi Cheng	"Creo en mi" (feat. Jackson Wang)	Believe in Mi	Yes	(rap part only)	No	—N/a
2018	Got7	"OMW" (Mark feat. Jackson Wang)	Present: You	Yes	Mark, Wizil, Boytoy	Yes	Mark, Boytoy
2018	Got7	"Made It"	Present: You	Yes	—N/a	Yes	Boytoy
2018	Jackson Wang	"Different Game" (feat. Gucci Mane)	Non-album single	Yes	Gucci Mane	Yes	Boytoy
2018	Got7	"I Love It"	Present: You & Me	Yes	Gen Neo	Yes	Gen Neo
2018	Got7	"WOLO"	Present: You & Me	Yes	BamBam, Yugyeom	Yes	Gen Neo
2018	Got7	"Hunger"	Present: You & Me	Yes	—N/a	Yes	Boytoy
2018	Got7	"Phoenix"	Present: You & Me	Yes	Yugyeom	Yes	Yugyeom, Boytoy
2018	Fei	"Hello" (feat. Jackson Wang)	Non-album single	Yes	Tommy Park, Wang Feifei, J.Y Park "The Asiansoul", Peiyu	No	—N/a
2018	Got7	"Nightmare"	Non-album single	Yes	Mark, BamBam	No	—N/a

=== 2019 ===
Artist	Title	Album	Lyrics		Music	
Artist	Title	Album	Credited	With	Credited	With
Jackson Wang	"Bimmer Ride"	Non-album singles	Yes	—N/a	Yes	Boytoy
Jackson Wang, Ice	"Red"	Non-album singles	Yes	Ice	Yes	Ice
Nicholas Tse	"Abyss" (深淵) (feat. Jackson Wang)	Non-album singles	Yes	(rap part only)	No	—N/a
Nicholas Tse	"Shaping" (塑造) (feat. Jackson Wang)	Non-album singles	Yes	(rap part only)	No	—N/a
Dough-Boy, Jackson Wang	"MK Circus"	Non-album singles	Yes	Dough-Boy	Yes	Dough-Boy
Lai Kuan-lin	"Hypey" (feat. Jackson Wang)	9801	Yes	Boytoy, Young Sky	Yes	Boytoy, Young Sky
Jackson Wang	"Oxygen"	Non-album singles	Yes	—N/a	Yes	Boytoy
Jackson Wang, G.E.M.	"For the Love of It" (热爱就一起)	Non-album singles	Yes	G.E.M.	No	—N/a
GoldLink	"Rumble" (feat. Jackson Wang and Lil Nei)	Diaspora	Yes	D'Anthony William Carlos, Tobias Breuer, Canei Dontre Williams, Tavon D Thompson	Yes	D'Anthony William Carlos, Tobias Breuer, Canei Dontre Williams, Tavon D. Thompson
Roi	"Another" (feat. Jackson Wang)	Non-album single	Yes	Roi	Yes	Boytoy, Young Sky, Bull$Eye
Boy Story	"Too Busy" (feat. Jackson Wang)	Too Busy	Yes	Kim Eun-soo	Yes	Boytoy
Stephanie Poetri, Jackson Wang	"I Love You 3000 II"	Head in the Clouds II	Yes	Gregory "Aldae" Hein, Stephanie Poetri	Yes	Gregory "Aldae" Hein, Stephanie Poetri
Jackson Wang, Higher Brothers	"Tequila Sunrise" (feat. August 08 and GoldLink)	Head in the Clouds II	Yes	Rory Andrew, Stephen Feigenbaum, Ray "August Grant" Jacobs, Maurice Powell, Nathaniel Mann, Gregory "Aldae" Hein, KnowKnow, Masiwei, D'Anthony Carlos	Yes	Rory Andrew, Stephen Feigenbaum, Ray "August Grant" Jacobs, Maurice Powell, Nathaniel Mann, Gregory "Aldae" Hein, KnowKnow, Masiwei, D'Anthony Carlos
Joji, Jackson Wang	"Walking"	Head in the Clouds II	Yes	Thomas Pentz, Gregory "Aldae" Hein, Maximilian Jaeger, Montana Wayne Best, George Miller, Boaz de Jong, Francesco Robin, Khalif Brown	Yes	Thomas Pentz, Gregory "Aldae" Hein, Maximilian Jaeger, Montana Wayne Best, George Miller, Boaz de Jong, Francesco Robin, Khalif Brown
Jackson Wang	"Bullet to the Heart"	Mirrors	Yes	Gregory "Aldae" Hein, Ian Gottschalk, Sam Homaee, John Wienner	Yes	Gregory "Aldae" Hein, Ian Gottschalk, Sam Homaee, John Wienner
Jackson Wang	"On the Rocks"	Mirrors	Yes	Gregory "Aldae" Hein, Kyle Owens, Sean Turk, Maurice Powell	Yes	Gregory "Aldae" Hein, Kyle Owens, Sean Turk, Maurice Powell
Jackson Wang	"Unless I'm With You"	Mirrors	Yes	Boytoy, Gregory "Aldae" Hein, Christian Dold, Mathis Rosenholm	Yes	Boytoy, Gregory "Aldae" Hein, Christian Dold, Mathis Rosenholm
Jackson Wang	"Dway!"	Mirrors	Yes	Bijan Amirkhani, Gregory "Aldae" Hein, Ray Davon Jacobs, Sebastian Alfredo Lopez, Maurice Powell, Jake Asher Rahman, Amber Marie Sassman	Yes	Bijan Amirkhani, Gregory "Aldae" Hein, Ray Davon Jacobs, Sebastian Alfredo Lopez, Maurice Powell, Jake Asher Rahman, Amber Marie Sassman
KnowKnow	"Face Power" (feat. Jackson Wang)	Mr. Enjoy Da Money	Yes	KnowKnow	Yes	KnowKnow

=== 2020–2021 ===
Year	Artist	Title	Album	Lyrics		Music	
Year	Artist	Title	Album	Credited	With	Credited	With
2020	Jackson Wang	"100 Ways"	Non-album single	Yes	Peter Rycroft, Pablo Bowman, Emir Taha, Tom Mann	Yes	Peter Rycroft, Pablo Bowman, Emir Taha, Tom Mann
2020	Got7	"God Has Return + Mañana"	Dye	Yes	Mark, BamBam	No	—N/a
2020	Jackson Wang, Galantis	"Pretty Please"	Non-album single	Yes	Christian Karlsoon, Adam Korbesmeyer, Jerry Lang, Jan Postma, Jeremy P. Felton, Jordi Thom Corné De Fluiter	Yes	Christian Karlsoon, Adam Korbesmeyer, Jerry Lang, Jan Postma, Jeremy P. Felton, Jordi Thom Corné De Fluiter
2020	Got7	"Special"	Breath of Love: Last Piece	Yes	Boytoy, Young Sky	Yes	Boytoy, Young Sky
2020	Jackson Wang, JJ Lin	"Should've Let Go" (過)	Non-album singles	No	—N/a	Yes	JJ Lin
2021	Jackson Wang	"Alone" (一個人)	Non-album singles	Yes		Yes	Disko, Boytoy
2021	Rain	"Magnetic" (feat. Jackson Wang)	Pieces by Rain	Yes	Boytoy, Peter Hyun, Young Sky	Yes	Boytoy, Peter Hyun, Young Sky
2021	VaVa	"So Bad" (feat. Jackson Wang)	Non-album singles	Yes	VaVa	Yes	VaVa
2021	Afgan	"M.I.A" (feat. Jackson Wang)	Non-album singles	Yes	Chaz Jackson, Dashawn White, Afgan, Benny Mayne, Emily Vaughn, Orlando Williamson, Brandon Hamlen, Ishmael Montague, Carl Taylor Jr	Yes	Chaz Jackson, Dashawn White, Afgan, Benny Mayne, Emily Vaughn, Orlando Williamson, Brandon Hamlen, Ishmael Montague, Carl Taylor Jr
2021	Jackson Wang	"LMLY"	Non-album singles	No	—N/a	Yes	Michael Matosic, Richard Boardman, Peter Rycroft, Pablo Bowman
2021	Rich Brian, Niki	"California (Remix)" (feat. Jackson Wang and Warren Hue)	Non-album singles	Yes	Rich Brian, Niki, Warren Hue, Steven Richard Ayala, Caesar Alexander Romero, Syed Afjad Hossain, Eric Anthony Steiner, Paimon Jahanbin, Nima Jahanbin, Jack LoMastro, Angelo Arce, Zach Rapp, Matthew Morales, Jacob Ray, Chris Miles	Yes	Rich Brian, Niki, Warren Hue, Steven Richard Ayala, Caesar Alexander Romero, Syed Afjad Hossain, Eric Anthony Steiner, Paimon Jahanbin, Nima Jahanbin, Jack LoMastro, Angelo Arce, Zach Rapp, Matthew Morales, Jacob Ray, Chris Miles
2021	Jackson Wang	"Drive You Home"	Non-album singles	Yes	David Stewart, Nicholas Mira, Ric Ocasek	Yes	David Stewart, Nicholas Mira, Ric Ocasek
2021	XXXL	"KO" (feat. Jackson Wang)	Non-album singles	Yes	XXXL, L4WUDU, Future Soldier	Yes	XXXL, L4WUDU, Future Soldier

=== 2022–2025 ===
Year	Artist	Title	Album	Lyrics		Music	
Year	Artist	Title	Album	Credited	With	Credited	With
2022	Jackson Wang	"Jackson Wang" (王嘉尔)	Non-album single	Yes	—N/a	Yes	—N/a
2022	CrazyBoy	"Damn Girl" (feat. Jackson Wang)	Hip Life: Pop Life	Yes	CrazyBoy, Jay'ed	Yes	Nakkid, Jay'ed
2022	Amber Liu	"Easier" (feat. Jackson Wang)	Z!	Yes	Amber Liu, Chelsea Lena, Shaylen, Mike McGarity	Yes	Amber Liu, Chelsea Lena, Shaylen, Mike McGarity
2022	Jackson Wang	"Poison"	Lost & Found	Yes	Barney Bones, Isaac Valenzuela, Jacob Ray, Joshua Deon Lockhart, Ray Jacobs	Yes	Barney Bones, Isaac Valenzuela, Jacob Ray, Joshua Deon Lockhart, Ray Jacobs
2022	Jackson Wang	"Dead"	Lost & Found	Yes	Barney Bones, DJ Swish, Joshua Deon Lockhart, Ray Jacobs	Yes	Barney Bones, DJ Swish, Joshua Deon Lockhart, Ray Jacobs
2022	Jackson Wang	"I Don't Have It"	Lost & Found	Yes	Ashton McCreight, Barney Bones, Daniel Barry Shyman, Jacob Ray, Joshua Deon Lockhart, Ray Jacobs	Yes	Ashton McCreight, Barney Bones, Daniel Barry Shyman, Jacob Ray, Joshua Deon Lockhart, Ray Jacobs
2022	Jackson Wang	"Power"	Lost & Found	Yes	Barney Bones, Ray Jacobs, Tal Halperin	Yes	Barney Bones, Ray Jacobs, Tal Halperin
2022	Jackson Wang	"Blackout"	Lost & Found	Yes	Blaise Railey, Isaac Valenzuela, Jacob Ray	Yes	Isaac Valenzuela, Jacob Ray
2022	Jackson Wang	"In My Bed"	Lost & Found	Yes	Gregory "Aldae" Hein, Capi, Jonathan L. Wienner, Sam Homaee	Yes	Gregory "Aldae" Hein, Capi, Jonathan L. Wienner, Sam Homaee
2022	Jackson Wang	"The Moment"	Lost & Found	Yes	Alda Agustiano, Antoine Norwood, Rogét Chahayed, Taylor Dexter, Wesley Singerman	Yes	Alda Agustiano, Antoine Norwood, Rogét Chahayed, Taylor Dexter, Wesley Singerman
2022	Jackson Wang	"Vibes"	Lost & Found	Yes	Brian Keenan, Chris Miles, Jacob Ray, Marcus Rivers	Yes	Brian Keenan, Chris Miles, Jacob Ray, Marcus Rivers
2022	Jackson Wang	"Blow"	Magic Man	Yes	Cameron Bartolini, Jack Samson, Liam Kevany, Louis Bartolini, Patrick Michael Smith	No	—N/a
2022	Jackson Wang	"Go Ghost"	Magic Man	Yes	Dru Decaro, Louis Bartolini, Powers Pleasant, William Schultz	No	—N/a
2022	Jackson Wang	"Champagne Cool"	Magic Man	Yes	Cameron Bartolini, Jack Samson, Louis Bartolini, Patrick Michael Smith	No	—N/a
2022	Jackson Wang	"Come Alive"	Magic Man	Yes	Cameron Bartolini, Chris Miles, Jack Samson, Leelee, Louis Bartolini	No	—N/a
2022	Jackson Wang	"Why Why Why"	Non-album singles	Yes	Ryan Bickley, Josh McClelland	Yes	Aaron Kim, Ghostchild, Isaac Han, Ryan Bickley, Josh McClelland
2023	Tablo	"Imagine" (feat. Jackson Wang)	Non-album singles	Yes	Tablo, Boytoy, Wright Aaron Lewis, Brite Ma	Yes	Disko, Tablo, Boytoy, Wright Aaron Lewis, Brite Ma
2023	Code Kunst	"911" (feat. Jackson Wang)	Remember Archive	Yes	Avin, Slay	No	—N/a
2023	Jackson Wang	"Slow" (feat. Ciara)	Non-album singles	Yes	Alexis Andrea Boyd, Antoine Norwood, Ciara Harris, Joshua Ishmael Logan	Yes	Alexis Andrea Boyd, Antoine Norwood, Bigram Zayas, Ciara Harris, Joshua Ishmael Logan, Luis Mario Melendez
2023	Jackson Wang	"Cheetah"	Non-album singles	Yes	—N/a	Yes	—N/a
2023	Psy.P, Jackson Wang	"All Eyes"	Non-album singles	Yes	Psy.P	Yes	Psy.P, Tyler Little, Mitchell Bashford, Brite Ma, Isaac Han
2024	BIBI, Jackson Wang	"Feeling Lucky"	Non-album singles	Yes	Gregory "Aldae" Hein, Abby-Lynn Keen, Kurtis Wells	Yes	Gregory "Aldae" Hein, Abby-Lynn Keen, Kurtis Wells
2024	Jackson Wang	"henny"	Non-album singles	Yes	Aaron Kim, Isaac Han, Walter Pok	Yes	Isaac Han
2024	Riaan	"Treat Me Better"	Non-album singles	Yes	Riaan, 37, Amos Ang, Flip_00, Gen Neo, Lydia Ganada	No	—N/a
2025	Got7	"Smooth"	Winter Heptagon	Yes	Alexis Andrea Boyd, Sayak Das, Louis Bartolini	Yes	Louis Bartolini, Sayak Das
2025	Got7	"Yours Truly," (우리가할수있는말은.)	Winter Heptagon	Yes	Got7	No	—N/a
2025	Jackson Wang	"High Alone"	Magic Man 2	Yes	Andre Wollrabe, Charles Martin, Dwyane Flaming	Yes	Andre Wollrabe, Charles Martin, Dwyane Flaming
2025	Jackson Wang	"Not For Me"	Magic Man 2	Yes	Sayak Das, Louis Bartolini, Alexis Andrea Boyd, Aaron Kim	Yes	Sayak Das, Louis Bartolini, Alexis Andrea Boyd, Aaron Kim
2025	Jackson Wang	"Access"	Magic Man 2	Yes	Dem Jointz, Sayak Das, Louis Bartolini, Alexis Andrea Boyd	Yes	Dem Jointz, Sayak Das, Louis Bartolini, Alexis Andrea Boyd
2025	Jackson Wang	"Buck" (feat. Diljit Dosanjh)	Magic Man 2	Yes	Dem Jointz, Alexis Andrea Boyd, Diljit Dosanjh, Sayak Das, Cheema Singh	Yes	Dem Jointz, Alexis Andrea Boyd, Sayak Das, Cheema Singh
2025	Jackson Wang	"GBAD"	Magic Man 2	Yes	—N/a	Yes	Dem Jointz
2025	Jackson Wang	"Hate to Love"	Magic Man 2	Yes	Sayak Das, Louis Bartolini, Alexis Andrea Boyd	Yes	Sayak Das, Louis Bartolini, Alexis Andrea Boyd
2025	Jackson Wang	"One Time"	Magic Man 2	Yes	—N/a	Yes	—N/a
2025	Jackson Wang	"Everything"	Magic Man 2	Yes	Sayak Das, Louis Bartolini, Alexis Andrea Boyd, Michelle Oliveira	Yes	Sayak Das, Louis Bartolini, Alexis Andrea Boyd, Michelle Oliveira
2025	Jackson Wang	"Dear:"	Magic Man 2	Yes	Sayak Das, Louis Bartolini	Yes	Sayak Das, Louis Bartolini
2025	Jackson Wang	"Sophie Ricky"	Magic Man 2	Yes	Sayak Das, Louis Bartolini, Alexis Andrea Boyd, Aaron Kim	Yes	Sayak Das, Louis Bartolini, Alexis Andrea Boyd, Aaron Kim
2025	Jackson Wang	"Made Me a Man"	Magic Man 2	Yes	Sayak Das, Louis Bartolini, Alexis Andrea Boyd	Yes	Sayak Das, Louis Bartolini, Alexis Andrea Boyd
