= × Renantanda =

Scientific classification
- Kingdom: Plantae
- Clade: Tracheophytes
- Clade: Angiosperms
- Clade: Monocots
- Order: Asparagales
- Family: Orchidaceae
- Subfamily: Epidendroideae
- Tribe: Vandeae
- Subtribe: Aeridinae
- Genus: × Renantanda hort.

Genus of plants

× Renantanda, abbreviated Rntda. in the horticultural trade, is the nothogenus for intergeneric hybrids between the orchid genera Renanthera and Vanda (Ren. x V.). Its parent plants are both endangered, and have separate breeding seasons, so this hybrid is incredibly rare. Because of that, it is highly marketable.

== Greges ==
- Rntda. Lily Aow = V. Pukele × Ren. Storiei – cultured by Boon Kee Aow, the orchid was named after Lee Lee Aow, his eldest daughter
