= List of killings by law enforcement officers in the United States, April 2013 =

This is a list of people reported killed by non-military law enforcement officers in the United States in April 2013, whether in the line of duty or not, and regardless of reason or method. The listing documents the occurrence of a death, making no implications regarding wrongdoing or justification on the part of the person killed or officer involved. Killings are arranged by date of the incident that caused death. Different death dates, if known, are noted in the description. The table below lists 94 people.

== April 2013 ==
Date	Name (Age) of Deceased	Race	State (City)	Description
2013-04-30	Vernon McCoy Mathis (59)	White	Georgia (Homerville)	
2013-04-30	Jayson Leon Carmickle (28)	White	Utah (Vernal)	
2013-04-30	Gary Dean Carty (60)	Unknown race	Virginia (Coeburn)	
2013-04-30	Christopher Todd Jones (41)	White	Florida (Jacksonville)	
2013-04-30	Edward Ramirez (35)	Hispanic	California (Los Angeles)	
2013-04-30	Todd Jones	Unknown	Florida (Jacksonville)	In an argument with his step-father, he ambushed his step-father, stabbing him. SWAT arrived, Todd Jones approached them, and was hit with 11 bullets. Deemed a suicide by cop.
2013-04-29	Diaz Candelaria, Alexis (34)	Hispanic	Florida (Orlando)	
2013-04-29	Darkis, Ross (42)	Unknown	Indiana (Vincennes)	Officers trying to subdue a man with a gun fatally shot him Monday night on his front porch. Police say Ross Darkis, 42, threatened them with the gun and was shot multiple times. He later died at the hospital.
2013-04-29	Urie Adriel Gilchrist (23)	Black	Texas (Houston)	
2013-04-29	unnamed male (32)	Unknown	Pennsylvania (Philadelphia)	Police say they responded to a domestic violence call to find a man with a knife to his girlfriend's neck. An officer shot and killed the man after he allegedly lunged at officers with a knife.
2013-04-28	Kirk, Pamela (53)	White	Florida (St. Petersburg)	
2013-04-28	Jesse Delgadillo (21)	Hispanic	California (Long Beach)	
2013-04-27	Maria Zarco (33)	Hispanic	California (San Diego)	
2013-04-27	Chris G. Nowicki (46)	White	Wisconsin (Milwaukee)	
2013-04-27	Gabriel Winzer (25)	Black	Texas (Frog)	
2013-04-27	Jean N. Printemps (28)	Black	Florida (Miramar)	
2013-04-27	TaVontae Haney (19)	Black	Indiana (Fort Wayne)	Haney was a passenger in an SUV that police pulled over, and fled the scene. Police pursued, ordering him to drop a handgun he was carrying. Witnesses say he refused to do so and even pointed it toward the officers, who fatally shot him. Prosecutors declared the shooting justified in self-defense and declined to file charges. In a wrongful death lawsuit, Haney's mother claims he was unarmed and posed no immediate threat to officers.
2013-04-27	Ronald Michael Davis (31)	Black	Kentucky (Georgetown)	
2013-04-27	Dennis Lawrence (47)	White	Arkansas (Melbourne)	
2013-04-26	Cody Point (18)	Black	Texas (Atascocita)	
2013-04-26	Brice Quintin Jefferson (24)	Black	California (Athens)	
2013-04-25	Kenzell Hobbs (18)	Black	Arkansas (Little Rock)	
2013-04-25	Chad Lee Hanchett (36)	White	California (Garden Grove)	
2013-04-25	Felipe Corrales (45)	Hispanic	California (San Fernando)	
2013-04-24	Ball, Cary (25)	Black	Missouri (St. Louis)	Ball was shot after allegedly pointing a gun at officers. Police say they recovered a loaded .40 caliber semi-automatic gun with an extended magazine at the scene.
2013-04-24	James Coleman (45)	Black	Wisconsin (Milwaukee)	
2013-04-24	Brandon Smith (29)	Black	Texas (Fort Worth)	
2013-04-24	Smith, Rick (43)	White	Illinois (Manchester)	Rick Smith shot and killed five people (3 adults and 2 children) and wounded another person. After driving away, he engaged into a gunfight with police. Smith was killed in the shootout.
2013-04-24	Lopez, Robert (33)	Hispanic	Arizona (Tucson)	Lopez was hiding in a doghouse in the backyard of a woman's residence. The police officers attended the scene, saw that he was armed with a handgun, and opened fire.
2013-04-23	Herbert Babelay (54)	White	Texas (Austin)	
2013-04-23	Amjustine Hunter (28)	Black	Tennessee (Memphis)	
2013-04-22	Alexis Yamil Perez (19)	White	New Jersey (Pleasantville)	
2013-04-22	Morgan, Michael (47)	White	Florida (Longwood)	
2013-04-22	Johnson, Victor (22)	Unknown	Indiana (Calumet City)	Shot during foot chase when police say he drew a handgun.
2013-04-22	William Emanuel Poplos (57)	White	Florida (Merritt Island)	
2013-04-22	Larry Hooker (23)	Black	Maryland (Baltimore)	
2013-04-22	Eric Andrews (24)	Black	Georgia (Norcross)	
2013-04-21	Clark, Dennis III (27)	Black	Washington (Federal Way)	Mr. Clark was shot to death by Federal Way police after having killed his girlfriend and three apparently otherwise unrelated witnesses.
2013-04-21	Fred Bradford Jr. (51)	Black	Texas (Dallas)	
2013-04-20	Xavier Barba (25)	Hispanic	California (Visalia)	
2013-04-20	Jonathan Pimentel (31)	Hispanic	Arizona (Phoenix)	
2013-04-20	Zachariah Pithan (22)	White	Arizona (Phoenix)	
2013-04-20	Demps, Craig (22)	Black	Florida (West Palm Beach)	Demps was unarmed and running away from an allegedly stolen car when police fatally shot him.
2013-04-20	Travis Trisoliere (33)	White	Arizona (Apache Junction)	
2013-04-20	Justin Tyler Harrigill (25)	White	Mississippi (Crystal Springs)	
2013-04-19	William Boyd Plant (62)	White	Arizona (Glendale)	
2013-04-19	Barry Mead Sr. (51)	Unknown race	Pennsylvania (Westfield Boro)	
2013-04-19	Julie Serna Gonzales (42)	Hispanic	Virginia (Stafford)	
2013-04-19	Wilson A. Lutz (66)	White	Wisconsin (Menasha)	
2013-04-19	Anthony Howard (51)	Unknown race	Maryland (Gaithersburg)	
2013-04-18	Kenneth Philipp (50)	White	Pennsylvania (Holland)	
2013-04-18	Lisa Renee Miller (47)	White	West Virginia (Coal City)	
2013-04-18	Beau Appleton (57)	White	Missouri (Warrensburg)	
2013-04-18	John R. Monroe (42)	Black	Maryland (Baltimore)	
2013-04-17	Thomas G. Manuel III (22)	Black	Michigan (Genesee Township)	
2013-04-19	Tsarnaev, Tamerlan (26)	White	Massachusetts (Watertown)	A suspect in the Boston Marathon bombings, Tamerlan Tsarnaev was killed in a shootout with officers. Police say that his younger brother Dzhokhar Tsarnaev ran him over with an SUV in an attempt to escape, but ER doctors who treated him said he did not appear to have been run over. A medical examiner stated the cause of death as gunshot wounds to the torso and extremities and blunt trauma to the head and torso.
2013-04-17	Dale Wilkerson (60)	White	California (San Francisco)	
2013-04-17	Margarito Martinez Gallegos (25)	Hispanic	Texas (Three Rivers)	
2013-04-15	Dylan Samuel-Peters (1)	Black	New York (Brooklyn)	
2013-04-15	Dason Peters (33)	Black	New York (Brooklyn)	
2013-04-13	Jesus Antonio Torres (29)	Hispanic	Arizona (Phoenix)	
2013-04-13	Christopher John Wenning (21)	White	California (Bear Valley Springs)	
2013-04-13	Perez, Alexis (19)	Unknown	New Jersey (Pleasantville)	Perez was shot a killed by several Pleasantville police officers as he approached them with a knife in hand. Perez refused all commands to drop the weapon.
2013-04-12	Michael D. Findley (45)	White	Missouri (Joplin)	
2013-04-12	Curtis Hicks (52)	White	Georgia (Alpharetta)	
2013-04-12	Jesse Aguirre (37)	Hispanic	Texas (San Antonio)	
2013-04-11	Adam James Stevens (25)	White	California (Red Bluff)	
2013-04-11	Kodie Victor (67)	Unknown race	Arizona (Cottonwood)	
2013-04-11	Harold Lee Daniels (59)	Unknown race	Virginia (Rapidan)	
2013-04-10	Daniel Brock (47)	White	Tennessee (Memphis)	
2013-04-10	Robert Kevin Hughes (41)	White	Virginia (Christiansburg)	
2013-04-10	Thomas Jeffery Sadler (45)	White	North Carolina (Raleigh)	
2013-04-10	Lauren Brown (55)	White	Georgia (Suwanee)	
2013-04-10	Robert Hensley (39)	White	Ohio (Celina)	
2013-04-09	Edgar Villareal (25)	Hispanic	California (Lynwood)	
2013-04-09	Cleman R. Sweptson Jr. (34)	Black	Washington, DC	
2013-04-09	Stout, Christopher Lee (23)	White	Oklahoma (Oklahoma City)	Stout was shot and killed by OKCPD officers after attempting to flee the scene where a warrant was being served by US Marshals.
2013-04-09	Stout, Stacy (20)	White	Oklahoma (Oklahoma City)	Stout was shot and killed by OKCPD officers after attempting to flee the scene where a warrant was being served by US Marshals.
2013-04-08	Jonathan Alvarado (24)	Unknown race	Connecticut (Westbrook)	
2013-04-08	Bradford Louis Etheredge (37)	Black	Louisiana (Baton Rouge)	
2013-04-08	Emily J. Krumrei (31)	White	Texas (Richardson)	
2013-04-07	Alexander Wilson (16)	Black	Arizona (Phoenix)	
2013-04-07	David Mulder (43)	Unknown race	California (Fontana)	
2013-04-06	Adam James Trahan (41)	White	Louisiana (Crowley)	
2013-04-05	Detlef Wulf (27)	Native American	Alaska (Fairview)	
2013-04-04	Jermaine C. Coleman Jr. (20)	Black	Ohio (Dayton)	
2013-04-04	Lori Lee Lee (50)	Unknown race	Michigan (Champion)	
2013-04-04	Courtier, Mark (50)	Unknown	California (Los Angeles)	Courtier was pulled over on suspicion of drunk driving and allegedly attempted to flee the scene. He was tased and also suffered a facial laceration in a struggle with officers to arrest him. Courtier became unresponsive at the scene and was pronounced dead after arriving at a hospital.
2013-04-02	Thomas O'Dell (41)	White	Arkansas (Bryant)	
2013-04-02	Matthew Renard Joseph (23)	Black	Michigan (Detroit)	
2013-04-02	William E. Morris (24)	Black	Indiana (Indianapolis)	
2013-04-01	Brower, Sheri (49)	White	Florida (Pembroke Pines)	
2013-04-01	Bryan Stukes (21)	Black	Connecticut (Bridgeport)	
2013-04-01	Joshua Stevens (32)	White	Colorado (Hot Sulphur Springs)	

== See also ==
- Death in custody § United States
- Henry A. Wallace Police Crime Public Database
- List of cases of police brutality
- List of countries with annual rates and counts for killings by law enforcement officers
- List of law enforcement officers killed in the line of duty in the United States
- List of law enforcement officers convicted for an on-duty killing in the United States
- List of shootings by US immigration agents
- List of police reforms related to the George Floyd protests
- List of unarmed African Americans killed by law enforcement officers in the United States
- Lists of killings by law enforcement officers
- Police brutality in the United States
- Police misconduct § United States
- Police riot § United States
- Police use of deadly force in the United States
