= Leele =

Leele may refer to:

- Lele people, an ethnic group of the Democratic Republic of the Congo
- Ouka Leele (born 1957), Spanish photographer
- Leele, a character in the animated series Gravion

== See also ==
- Lele (disambiguation)
