= Robert E. Valett =

- Born: November 22, 1927; Clinton, Iowa, US
- Died: November 14, 2008 (aged 80)
- Education: MA, Ed.D
- Alma mater: University of Iowa George Williams College
- Occupations: Psychologist, author
- Notable work: Spiritual Guides to Holistic Health and Happiness
- Spouse: Shirley Bellman
- Children: 5

Robert E. Valett (November 22, 1927 – November 14, 2008) was an American psychology professor who wrote more than 20 books primarily focused on educational psychology. He earned the distinguished psychologist award from the San Joaquin Psychological Association and was a president of the California Association of School Psychologists.

== Early life and education ==
Robert Edward Valett was born in Clinton, Iowa on November 22, 1927. His father, Edward John Valett, worked for the railroad as a pipe fitter and his mother, Myrtle (née Peterson), was a saleswoman. Valett attended Clinton High School while also achieving the rank of Eagle Scout in the Boy Scouts of America. During World War 2, he served in the U.S. Navy Medical Corps. He then did his undergraduate work at the University of Iowa and George Williams College. Valett went on to earn an MA from the University of Chicago (1951 ) and an (Ed.D.) in educational psychology from the University of California in Los Angeles.

== Career ==
Valett was a professor of psychology at Orange Coast College in Costa Mesa, Ca., and the University of Canterbury in New Zealand and taught psychology from 1970 to 1992 at California State University, Fresno where he was named Professor Emeritus. He authored several books on learning disabilities, child development, dyslexia and attention disorders/hyperactivity. He received the distinguished psychologist award from the San Joaquin Psychological Association in 1982 and served as president of the California Association of School Psychologists from 1971 to 1972.

== Personal life ==
In 1950, Valett married Shirley Bellman with whom he had five children. He died on November 14, 2008, in Fresno, California.

== Books ==
- The Remediation of Learning Disabilities -Fearon Publishers 1967
- A Psychoeducational Inventory of Basic Learning Abilities – Fearon Publishers 1968
- Developmental Task Analysis −1969
- Programming Learning Disabilities -Fearon 1969
- Modifying Children's Behavior: A Guide for Parents and Professionals -Fearon 1969
- Determining Individual Learning Objectives – Lear Siegler/Fearon1972
- A Basic Screening and Referral Form for Children with Suspected Learning and Behavioral Disabilities - Fearon 1972
- Learning Disabilities: Diagnostic-Prescriptive Instruments – Lake Pub Co 1973
- Self-actualization: A Guide to Happiness and Self-Determination -Argus Communications 1974
- The Psychoeducational Treatment of Hyperactive Children - Fearon 1974
- Affective-Humanistic Education; Goals, Programs & Learning Activities - L. Siegler/Fearon Publishers 1974
- Humanistic Education: Developing the Total Person - Mosby 1977
- Developing Cognitive Abilities: Teaching Children to Think – Mosby 1978
- The Dyslexia Screening Survey: A Checklist of Basic Neuropsychological Skills -Lake 1980
- Dyslexia, a Neuropsychological Approach to Educating Children With Severe Reading Disorders -Fearon Pitman, Costello Education 1980
- Valett Inventory of Critical Thinking Abilities (VICTA) -Wiley 1981
- How to Write an I.E. -with John Arena 1989
- The Valett Perceptual-Motor Transitions to Reading Program -with Shirley Bellamn Valett, Academic Therapy Publications 1990
- Spiritual Guide to Holistic Health and Happiness -Authors Choice Press 1997
