= Coqsseʻleelʻee =

Character in the mythology of Nakhi people

Coqssei-leelʻee (Naxi: Coqssei-leelʻee, [tsʰo˨˩ zə˧ lɯ˥ ɯ˧]) is a legendary character in the mythology of Nakhi people. He was recorded in the Naxi epic Coqbertv Zherlzzoq (literally: "the record of human migration") as the ancestor of human being.

== Name ==
The name "Coqssei-leelʻee" includes the Naxi word "Coq" (means elephant) and "ee" (means cattle), so in the Dongba symbols the word "Coqssei-leelʻee" is written as a person with a horn of cattle and nose of an elephant. (Notice that this is the way to show the pronunciation of this name, not meaning he has an appearance like an animal.)

== Legends ==
=== The great flood ===
Coqssei-leelʻee was seen as the survivor from the great flood. In Naxi mythology, this disaster was caused by the filth to world which come from the incest between Coqssei-leelʻee's five brothers and six sisters. Coqssei-leelʻee was the unique survivor with the help of the god and the goddess.

=== The two goddesses ===
After the flood, human had come into extinction, and the god advised him to find a goddess as wife to last human: "There are two goddess lived under the mount, the one have "vertical" blue eyes who is beautiful, another have "horizontal" blue eyes who is goodness. You should select the second one as your wife." However Coqssei-leelʻee forgot his advice and select the beautiful one, which caused his son and daughter as tree, monkey, bear and other creature. Coqssei-leelʻee was disappointed and had to find another wife to give birth to human being.

=== Marriage with Ceilheeqbbubbeq ===
The god advised another goddess named Ceilheeqbbubbeq to Coqssei-leelʻee. however, Ceilheeqbbubbeq's father, god Zzeelaq'apv, was opposed this marriage, and figured out many ways to kill him. With the help of Ceilheeqbbubbeq, Coqssei-leelʻee overcame all of these troubles and married with the goddess at last.

There are there sons of Coqssei-leelʻee and Ceilheeqbbubbeq in legend, one is the ancestor of Tibetan people, one is the ancestor of Nakhi people, and one is the ancestor of Bai people.

== See also ==
- Dongba
- Naxi script
