= Lélé, Cameroon =

Lélé
- Location in Cameroon
- Coordinates: 02°16′48″N 13°19′48″E
- Country: Cameroon
- Province: South Province
- Elevation: 17,713 ft (5,399 m)

Lélé is a town in southern Cameroon, near the junction of the borders of Cameroon, Gabon and Congo-Brazzaville.

== Statistics ==
- Population = 794

== See also ==
- Lélé River
