= Li Li (poet, born 1968) =

Contemporary Chinese poet

- 李立
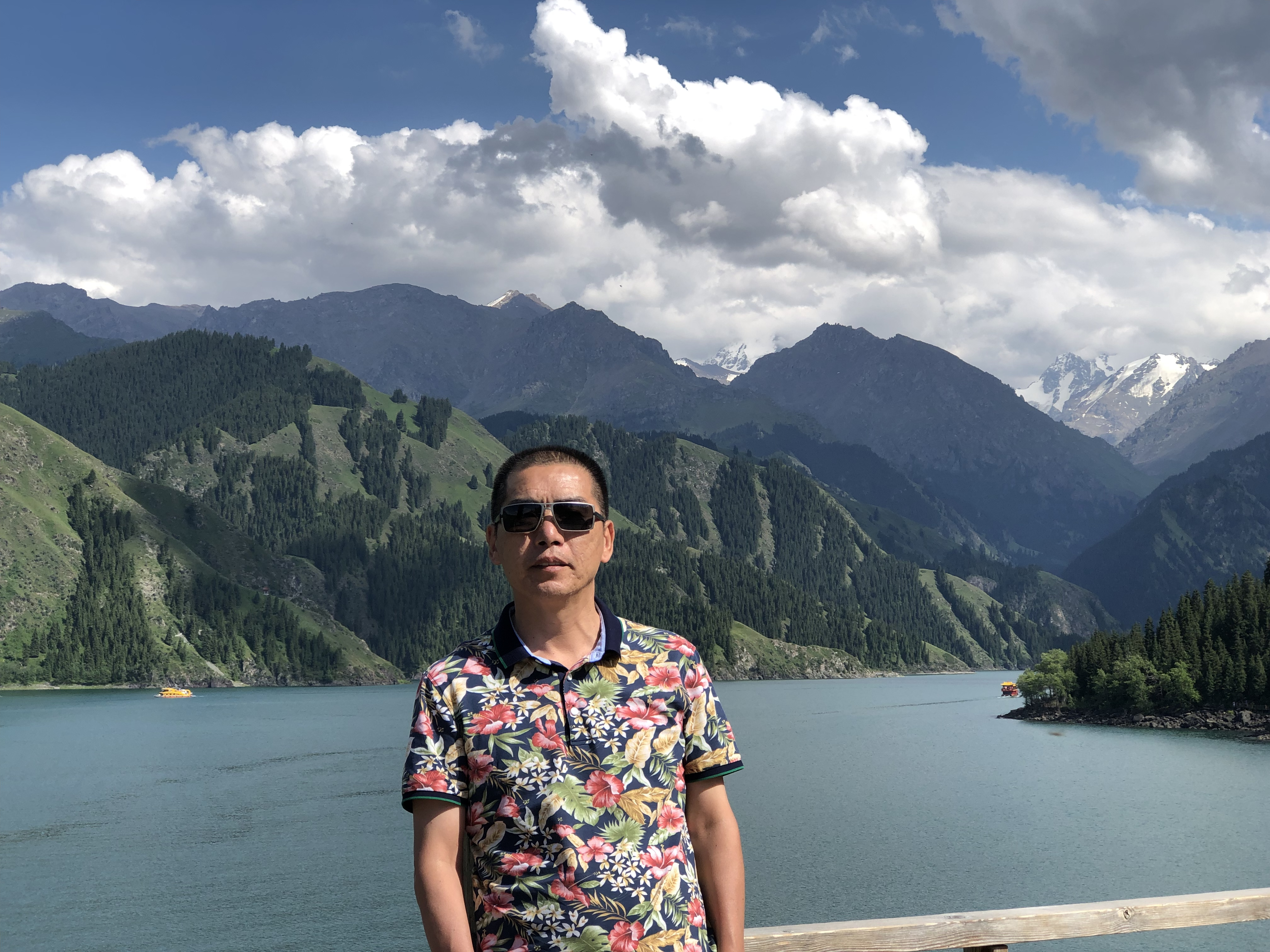
- Born: Shaoyang County, Hunan, China
- Occupations: Writer, poet
- Writing career
- Language: Chinese
- Notable awards: Boao International Poetry Award; Sydney International Poetry Award
- Literary movement: Xingyin poetry

Li Li (Simplified Chinese: 李立, born 1968) is a contemporary Chinese poet, born in Shaoyang County, Hunan Province. His works have been published in prominent literary journals such as Poetry Magazine (诗刊), People's Literature, Star Poetry Journal (星星诗刊), and Flower City (花城) etc.. He has won numerous domestic and international poetry awards, including the Boao International Poetry Award, the Sydney International Poetry Award, and the Yang Wanli Poetry Award.

Li Li has published multiple poetry collections, essays, and reportage literature. He is the editor-in-chief of the annual anthology Selected Chinese Xingyin Poetry and The Chinese Xingyin Poets Library series. Notably, he undertook a self-driven poetic journey along the borders of mainland China, establishing himself as a leading figure in the field of "Xingyin poetry" (行吟诗歌) in China.

== Works ==
=== Poetry collections ===
- The Tree of Youth
- At the Edge of the World
- Shenzhen Narratives
- Confessions of a Mental Patient, 2024
- The Long Ballad of the Yellow River (《黄河长调》)
- The Spine of Time (《时光背脊线》)

=== Essay collections ===
- The Sound of Nurture—Selected Essays

=== Reportage literature ===
- Soaring Golden Phoenix
