= Ramachandra Datatraya Lele =

Indian physician (1928–2022)

Ramachandra Dattatraya Lele
- Born: 16 January 1928
- Died: 24 June 2022 (aged 94)
- Known for: Nuclear Medicine

Ramachandra Dattatraya Lele (16 January 1928 – 24 June 2022) was a physician from India. He established the department of Nuclear Medicine at Jaslok Hospital. Over the years he has worked in medical education, practice, research and hospital administration. He held the roles of Professor and Department Head at Mumbai's Grant Medical College and Sir JJ Group of Hospitals. His autobiography, 'Pursuit of Excellence' was published in 2017.

== Achievements ==
In 1968 – together with the Bhabha Atomic Research Centre (BARC)'s health division – Lele established a shadow–shield type whole body counter, illustrating its clinical usage for measuring how well iron and Vitamin B12 are absorbed, as well as the amount of gastrointestinal blood loss and protein loss. This process did not require blood, urine or stool sample collections.

In 1973 Lele became Honorary Chief Physician and Chief of Nuclear Medicine at Jaslok Hospital and Research Centre, where he set up the first full-fledged hospital based Nuclear Medicine Department in Mumbai. Featuring radio-immunoassay of 75 ligands of clinical interest, he also guided the use of intravenous Technetium-99 m based radio pharmaceuticals in India.

== Awards ==
He was awarded the Padma Bhushan, third highest civilian honour of India by the President of India, in 1992.

- 1990: Distinguished Community Service Award (from the Rotary Club).
- 1991: 1st recipient of Gifted Teacher Award (from the Association of Physicians of India)
- 1992: Padma Bhushan Award (from the President of India)
- 1997: Dhanvantari Award (from the Governor of Maharashtra State)
- 2000: Honorary Doctor of Science degree (from the NTR University of Health Sciences and Andhra Pradesh)
- 2008: Homi Bhabha Lifetime Achievement Award (from the Indian Nuclear Society)
- 2011: Prof. M. Viswanathan National Award for Medical Teaching and Medical Care
