= Hide & Seek (Purple Kiss EP) =

2021 second EP by Purple Kiss

EP by Purple Kiss
- Released: September 8, 2021
- Recorded: 2020–2021
- Studio: RBW
- Length: 19:45
- Label: RBW, Kakao
- Producer: Jin-Woo Kim, Do-Hoon Kim (exec.)

Purple Kiss chronology
Into Violet (2021)	Hide & Seek (2021)	MemeM (2022)

Singles from Hide & Seek
- 1. "Zombie" Released: September 8, 2021

Hide & Seek is the second extended play by South Korean girl group Purple Kiss. It was released on September 8, 2021, by RBW.

== Background and release ==
On August 23, 2021, RBW announced that Purple Kiss will release their second extended play titled Hide & Seek on September 8, 2021, along with a logo motion teaser. Later that day, the group's first concept photo was released.

== Commercial performance ==
The album recorded 43,924 sales on the month of September, and peaked at number 5 on the 37th week of 2021.

== Critical reception ==
In addition, Zombie has been listed as one of 'The Best K-Pop Tracks of 2021' by Dazed. Dazed stated "Led by solid funk and disco influences, “Zombie” utilises an isolated electric guitar riff as a punchy transition, airy strings on the chorus, and plenty of bass to keep it at a pacey clip. On paper, it’s straightforward but this is merely a reliable base camp from which to scale to greater heights. Its secret weapon is two-fold – run riot with a visual mash-up of concepts (horror, girl crush, cute) and unleash Purple Kiss vocally."

=== Year-end lists ===
Critic/publication	List	Track	Rank	Ref.
Dazed	The Best K-Pop Tracks of 2021	"Zombie"	6	

== Track listing ==
Hide & Seek track listing
No.	Title	Lyrics	Music	Arrangement	Length
1.	"Zombie"	Kim Do-hoon (RBW); Kang Ji-won; Basick; CyA; Yuki	Kim Do-hoon (RBW); Kang Ji-won	Kim Do-hoon (RBW); Kang Ji-won	3:30
2.	"2am" (Korean: 새벽 2시; RR: Saebyeok 2si)	Purple Kiss; Davve(RBW)	Davve (RBW); Kwon Seok-hong (RBW); Kim Hyeong-gyu (RBW); Na Go-eun; Chae-in; Doshi	Davve (RBW); Kwon Seok-hong (RBW); $ up; Lee Joo-yong	3:09
3.	"Cast Pearls Before Swine" (Korean: 돼지 목에 진주 목걸이; RR: Dwaeji moge jinju mokkeori; lit. Pearl necklace on pig's neck)	Seo Yong-bae (RBW); Lee Hu-sang (RBW); Yuki	Seo Yong-bae (RBW); Lee Lee-sang	Lee Hu-sang (RBW)	3:08
4.	"So Why"	Chae-in; Yuki	Chae-in	Lee Sang-ho (RBW); Davve (RBW)	3:36
5.	"Twinkle" (Korean: 눈물과 보석, 별 그리고 너; RR: Nunmulgwa boseok, byeol geurigo; lit. Tears and jewels, stars and you)	Seo Yong-bae (RBW); Lee Sang (RBW); Minky (RBW); Yuki	Soe Yong-bae (RBW); Lee Sang-sang (RBW); Minky (RBW)	Seo Yong-bae (RBW); Lee Hu-sang (RBW); Minky (RBW)	3:30
6.	"ZzZz"	Mospick; Yuki	Mospick	Mospick	3:46
Total length:					19:45

== Charts ==
Weekly chart performance for "Hide & Seek"
Chart (2021)	Peak position
South Korean Albums (Gaon)	5

=== Monthly charts ===
Chart (2021)	Peak position
South Korean Albums (Gaon)	16

== Sales ==
Region	Certification	Certified units/sales
South Korea	—	43,924

== Release history ==
Release history for Hide & Seek
Region	Date	Format	Label
Various	September 8, 2021	Digital download; streaming	RBW; Kakao
South Korea	September 8, 2021	CD	RBW; Kakao
