= Pushkar Lele =

Pushkar Lele is a musician.

== Career ==
Lele, a child prodigy, was introduced to the world of music while in kindergarten when his aunt gifted him a toy harmonium. He would play National Anthem and other nursery rhymes on the toy harmonium. This is when his mother noticed his musical talent and started his formal music training in light music under Ms. Medha Gandhe.

== List of awards ==
- Pandit Vishnu Digambar Paluskar Award
- Dr. Vasantrao Deshpande Yuva Kalakaar Puraskaar
- Pandit Jitendra Abhisheki Smriti Yuva Puraskaar
