= Lélé River =

The Lélé or Lété is a river of Cameroon, in the south of the country.
