= Jackson Wang discography =

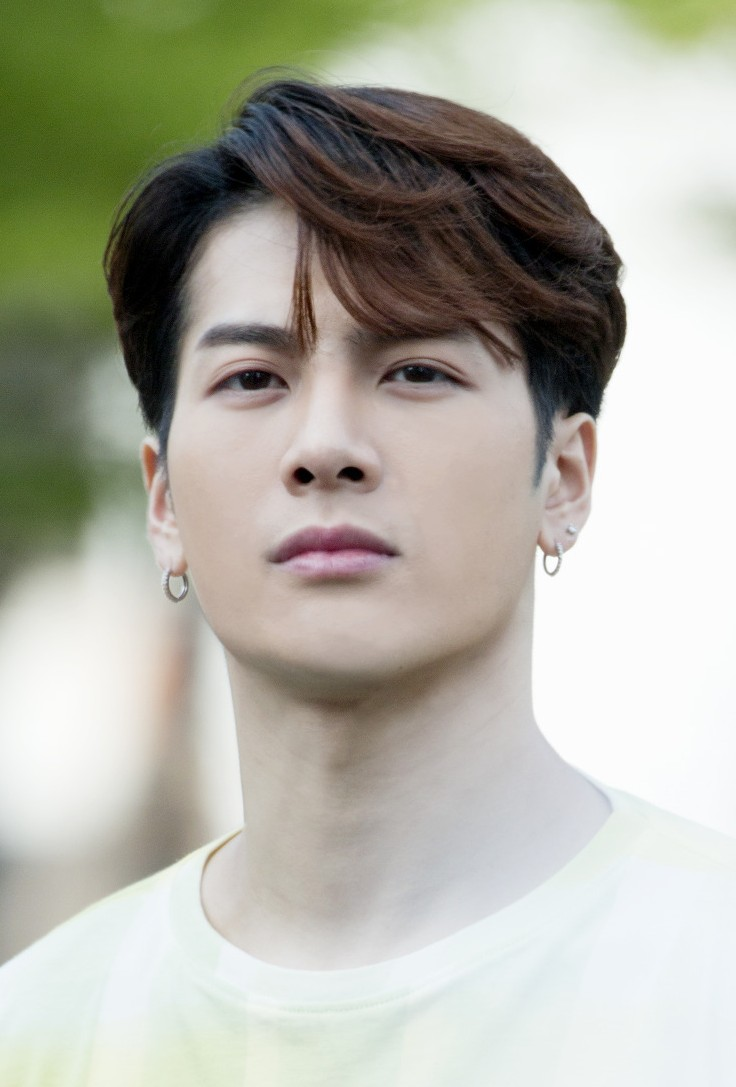
- Wang in 2019
- Studio albums: 3
- Singles: 27
- Mixtapes: 1
- Collaborations: 45
- Soundtrack appearances: 9

The discography of Hong Kong recording artist Jackson Wang consists of three studio albums and several singles and collaborations.

== Albums ==
=== Studio albums ===
Title	Album details	Peak chart positions						Sales
Title	Album details	AUS Dig.	FRA Dig.	JPN Dig.	KOR	UK Dig.	US	Sales
Mirrors	Released: 25 October 2019; Label: Team Wang, Western and 6th; Formats: Digital download, streaming	18	62	—	—	83	32	US: 14,000
Magic Man	Released: 9 September 2022; Label: Team Wang; Formats: CD, digital download, streaming	—	—	100	5	40	15	KOR: 101,789; US: 20,000
Magic Man 2	Released: 18 July 2025; Label: 88rising; Formats: LP, CD, digital download, streaming	—	—	53	4	23	13	KOR: 40,232; US: 32,000+

=== Mixtapes ===
Title	Album details
Lost & Found	Released: 7 March 2022; Label: Team Wang; Formats: Digital download, streaming

== Singles ==
=== As lead artist ===
Title	Year	Peak chart positions						Album
Title	Year	CHN	KOR Down.	NZ Hot	UK Asian	US Pop	US World	Album
"Papillon"	2017	—	—	—	—	—	—	Non-album singles
"(V)ision"	2017	—	—	—	—	—	—	Non-album singles
"Okay"	2017	—	—	—	—	—	—	Non-album singles
"#Mood" (with Meng Jia)	2017	—	—	—	—	—	—	Non-album singles
"Dawn of Us"	2018	—	—	—	—	—	—	Non-album singles
"Fendiman"	2018	—	—	—	—	—	—	Non-album singles
"Bruce Lee" (with Al Rocco)	2018	—	—	—	—	—	—	Non-album singles
"Different Game" (featuring Gucci Mane)	2018	—	—	—	—	—	—	Non-album singles
"Red" (with Ice)	2019	12	—	—	—	—	—	Non-album singles
"MK Circus" (with Dough–Boy)	2019	18	—	—	—	—	—	Non-album singles
"Oxygen"	2019	—	—	—	—	—	—	Non-album singles
"Another" (with Roi)	2019	58	—	—	—	—	—	Non-album singles
"Papillon" (Boytoy Remix)	2019	39	—	—	—	—	—	Non-album singles
"Bullet to the Heart"	2019	—	—	—	—	—	—	Mirrors
"Dway!"	2019	—	—	—	—	—	—	Mirrors
"Walking" (with Joji featuring Swae Lee and Major Lazer)	2019	—	—	28	—	39	—	Head in the Clouds II
"100 Ways"	2020	—	—	39	—	26	—	Non-album singles
"Pretty Please" (with Galantis)	2020	—	—	—	—	—	—	Non-album singles
"Should've Let Go" (with JJ Lin)	2020	—	—	—	—	—	19	Non-album singles
"Alone" (一個人)	2021	23	—	—	—	—	4	Non-album singles
"LMLY"	2021	8	—	—	—	33	—	Non-album singles
"Drive You Home" (with Internet Money)	2021	—	—	—	—	39	—	Non-album singles
"Jackson Wang" (王嘉尔)	2022	5	71	—	—	—	—	Non-album singles
"Blow"	2022	4	—	—	—	—	—	Magic Man
"Cruel"	2022	12	—	—	—	—	—	Magic Man
"Why Why Why"	2022	93	—	—	—	—	—	Non-album singles
"Slow" (with Ciara)	2023	—	—	—	—	—	—	Non-album singles
"Cheetah"	2023	—	—	—	—	—	—	Non-album singles
"All Eyes" (with Psy.P)	2024	—	—	—	—	—	—	Non-album singles
"Feeling Lucky" (with Bibi)	2024	—	—	—	—	31	—	Non-album singles
"Henny"	2024	—	—	—	—	—	—	Non-album singles
"High Alone"	2025	—	—	—	—	—	—	Magic Man 2
"GBAD"	2025	—	—	—	—	—	—	Magic Man 2
"Buck" (featuring Diljit Dosanjh)	2025	—	—	—	31	—	—	Magic Man 2
"Hate to Love"	2025	—	—	—	—	—	—	Magic Man 2
"Made Me a Man"	2025	—	—	—	—	25	—	Magic Man 2
"Let Loose"	2025	—	—	—	—	—	—	Non-album singles
"Deadend" (活該) (with Tyson Yoshi)	2026	59	—	—	—	—	—	Non-album singles
"Thank You"	2026	—	—	—	—	—	—	Non-album singles
"—" denotes releases that did not chart.

=== As featured artist ===
Title	Year	Peak chart positions	Album
Title	Year	CHN	Album
"Lucky Rain" (Tia Ray feat. Jackson)	2018	—	TIARA
"Creo en mi" (Sammi Cheng feat. Jackson)	2018	89	Believe In Mi
"Hello" (Fei feat. Jackson Wang)	2018	55	Non-album singles
"Abyss" (深淵) (Nicholas Tse feat. Jackson Wang)	2019	20	Non-album singles
"Shaping" (塑造) (Nicholas Tse feat. Jackson Wang)	2019	—	Non-album singles
"Too Busy" (Boy Story feat. Jackson Wang)	2019	63	Too Busy
"So Bad" (Vava feat. Jackson Wang)	2021	63	Non-album single
"M.I.A" (Afgan feat. Jackson Wang)	2021	—	Wallflower
"KO" (XXXL feat. Jackson Wang)	2021	—	Non-album single
"Damn Girl" (CrazyBoy feat. Jackson Wang)	2021	—	Hip Life: Pop Life
"Mind Games" (Milli feat. Jackson Wang)	2022	—	Non-album singles
"Imagine" (Boytoy feat. Jackson Wang and Tablo)	2023	—	Non-album singles
"Left Right Remixx" (XG feat. Ciara and Jackson Wang)	2023	—	Non-album singles
"Harder" (Amber Liu feat. Jackson Wang and Yultron)	2023	—	Non-album singles
"—" denotes releases that did not chart.

== Promotional releases ==
Title	Year	Peak chart positions	Note
Title	Year	CHN	Note
"Some Strange Work" (上班有些怪)	2016	—	Promotional song for Pizza Hut China
"Generation 2"	2017	—	Promotional song for Pepsi China
"X"	2018	—	Promotional song for Super X beer
"Bimmer Ride"	2019	57	Promotional song for BMW
"For the Love of It" (with G.E.M.)	2019	14	Promotional song for Pepsi China
"Fire to the Fuse" (with 88rising)	2022	—	Promotional song for League of Legends
"With You and Me" (with Angela Zhang, Sunnee, and JC-T)	2023	—	2022 Asian Games official theme song
"Zone" (圈) (with Psy.P and Bridge)	2023	—	Official 2023 theme song for Peace Elite
"Alive" (with Ashin Chen)	2026	30	Promotional song for Pepsi China

== Soundtrack appearances ==
Title	Year	Peak chart positions	Album
Title	Year	CHN	Album
"Stress Come On!" (스트레스 컴온!) (as part of Big Byung)	2014	—	Hyung-don and Dae-joon's Hitmaker
"Ojingeo doenjang" (오징어 된장) (as part of Big Byung)	2015	—	Hyung-don and Dae-joon's Hitmaker Part 2
"Fresh Sunday Theme Song" (透鲜滴星期天主题曲) (with He Jiong)	2016	—	Fresh Sunday OST
"Please" (拜托了) (with He Jiong and Go Fridge cast)	2016	—	Go Fridge OST
"Go Fridge Season 3 Theme Song" (拜托了冰箱3主题曲)	2017	—	Go Fridge OST
"Novoland: The Castle in the Sky" (九州天空城)	2017	—	Novoland: The Castle in the Sky OST
"U&I" (with Got7's JB)	2017	—	The Package OST
"Silence" (安静)	2019	—	Sound of My Dream 3 OST
"Born To Be Alive"	2022	—	Minions: The Rise of Gru OST
"Wanderer of the World" (天下过客)	2026	90	Blades of the Guardians OST

== Other charted songs ==
Title	Year	Peak chart positions					Album
Title	Year	CHN	JPN Comb.	JPN Hot	KOR	US World	Album
"Frozen in Time" (멈춰버린 시간) (Sunmi feat. Jackson)	2014	—	—	—	100	—	Full Moon
"Made It" (Jackson solo)	2018	43	—	—	—	—	Present: You
"Hunger" (Jackson solo)	2018	87	—	—	—	—	Present: You & Me
"Magnetic" (Rain feat. Jackson Wang)	2021	—	—	—	—	15	Pieces by Rain
"Blue"	2022	11	—	—	—	—	Magic Man
"GBAD" (Number_i remix)	2025	—	17	13	—	—	Non-album single

== Music videos ==
Year	Title	Artist	Director	Notes
2016	"Some Strange Work" (上班有些怪)	Jackson Wang		CF song for Pizza Hut China
2017	"Generation 2"	Jackson Wang	Ojun Kwon	CF song for Pepsi China
2017	"Papillon"	Jackson Wang	Ojun Kwon	
2017	"Papillon (Dance ver.)"	Jackson Wang		
2017	"Novoland: The Castle in the Sky" (九州天空城)			OST for Novoland: The Castle in the Sky 3D
2017	"U&I"	JB and Jackson Wang		Soundtrack for The Package
2017	(V)ision	Jackson Wang		CF song for Vivo Blue
2017	"Okay"	Jackson Wang	Ojun Kwon	
2017	"#Mood"	Meng Jia and Jackson Wang	Ojun Kwon	
2018	"Dawn of Us"	Jackson Wang	Ojun Kwon	
2018	"Fendiman"	Jackson Wang		CF song for Fendi China
2018	"Lucky Rain"	Tia Ray (feat. Jackson Wang)	An Xing	
2018	"Bruce Lee" (李小龙)	Al Rocco and Jackson Wang	JJ One, Alex One	
2018	"Creo en mi"	Sammi Cheng (feat. Jackson Wang)	Bill Chia	
2018	"Made It"	Jackson Wang	Naive Creative Production	Solo song from Got7's album Present: You
2018	"Different Game"	Gucci Mane and Jackson Wang	Ojun Kwon	
2018	"Hello"	Fei feat. Jackson Wang		
2019	"MK Circus"	Dough-Boy and Jackson Wang		
2019	"Abyss" (深淵)	Nicholas Tse (feat. Jackson Wang)		
2019	"Oxygen"	Jackson Wang	Ojun Kwon	
2019	"Shaping" (塑造)	Nicholas Tse (feat. Jackson Wang)		
2019	"For The Love of It" (热爱就一起)	G.E.M. and Jackson Wang		CF song for Pepsi China
2019	"Too Busy"	Boy Story (feat. Jackson Wang)		
2019	"Bullet to the Heart"	Jackson Wang	Daniel Cloud Campos	
2019	"I Love You 3000 II"	Stephanie Poetri and Jackson Wang		
2019	"Walking"	Joji and Jackson Wang (feat. Swae Lee and Major Lazer)	Eoin Glaister	
2019	"Dway!"	Jackson Wang	Daniel Cloud Campos	
2019	"Titanic"	Jackson Wang (feat. Rich Brian)	Brendan Vaughan	
2020	"100 Ways"	Jackson Wang	Daniel Cloud Campos	
2020	"Pretty Please"	Jackson Wang and Galantis	Jackson Wang, Conglin	
2020	"Should've Let Go" (過)	Jackson Wang and JJ Lin	Tao Lei	
2021	"Alone" (一個人)	Jackson Wang	Jackson Wang, Ojun Kwon	
2021	"Magnetic"	Rain (feat. Jackson Wang)	Jackson Wang, Mamesjao	
2021	"M.I.A."	Afgan (feat. Jackson Wang)		
2021	"LMLY"	Jackson Wang	Jackson Wang, Mamesjao	
2021	"California (Remix)"	Rich Brian and Niki (feat. Jackson Wang and Warren Hue)		
2021	"Drive You Home"	Jackson Wang and Internet Money	Jackson Wang, Mamesjao	
2022	"Jackson Wang" (王嘉尔)	Jackson Wang	Jackson Wang, Choi	
2022	"Blow"	Jackson Wang	Daniel Cloud Campos	
2022	"Cruel"	Jackson Wang	Rich Lee	
2022	"Blue"	Jackson Wang	Jenna Marsh	
2022	"Come Alive"	Jackson Wang	Rich Lee	
2022	"Why Why Why"	Jackson Wang	Choi	
2023	"Mind Games"	Milli feat. Jackson Wang		
2023	"Cheetah"	Jackson Wang	Sean Lew, Jackson Wang	
2023	"With You and Me"	Jackson Wang, Angela Zhang, Sunnee and JC-T	Gu Lei	
2024	"Feeling Lucky"	Jackson Wang and Bibi	Jason Ano	
2024	"Henny"	Jackson Wang	Jackson Wang	
2024	"Zone" (圈)	Jackson Wang, Psy.P, Bridge		
2025	"High Alone"	Jackson Wang	Rodrigo Inada	
2025	"GBAD"	Jackson Wang	Rich Lee	
2025	"GBAD"	Jackson Wang, Number_i		
2025	"Buck"	Jackson Wang feat. Diljit Dosanjh	Nicholas Lam	
2025	"Hate to Love"	Jackson Wang	James Mao	
2025	"Made Me a Man"	Jackson Wang	James Mao	
2025	"Let Loose"	Jackson Wang	Ojun Kwon and Jackson Wang	
2026	"Thank You"	Jackson Wang	Ojun Kwon and Jackson Wang	

== See also ==
- Got7 discography
