= Lost & Found (Jackson Wang mixtape) =

2022 mixtape by Jackson Wang

Mixtape by Jackson Wang
- Released: March 7, 2022
- Genre: R&B; Hip hop
- Length: 21:37
- Language: English
- Label: Team Wang Records

Jackson Wang chronology
Mirrors (2019)	Lost & Found (2022)	Magic Man (2022)

Lost & Found (stylized in all caps) is the first mixtape by Hong Kong recording artist Jackson Wang. It was released on March 7, 2022, through Team Wang Records. The mixtape was announced one day before release, and comprises eight old songs recorded in 2019 and never released before.

== Critical reception ==
Bollywood Hungama defined Lost & Found as "a tale of passion and intimate love." It also commented: "Each song is different and yet sports a strain of familiarity that is Jackson Wang's husky vocals," which "take the emotions a few notches higher."

Rolling Stone India included "In My Bed" in a list of five must-know Wang's songs, writing that the singer's deliberation over love "was a stellar gateway to his vocal competency."

== Promotion ==
Wang performed songs from the mixtape during the Magic Man World Tour.

== Track listing ==
Credits adapted from NetEase.

No.	Title	Lyrics	Music	Producer(s)	Length
1.	"Poison"	Barney Bones, Isaac Valenzuela, Jacob Ray, Joshua Deon Lockhart, Ray Jacobs, Jackson Wang	Barney Bones, Isaac Valenzuela, Jacob Ray, Joshua Deon Lockhart, Ray Jacobs, Jackson Wang	Jacob Ray, Isaac Valenzuela	3:12
2.	"Dead"	Bones, DJ Swish, Lockhart, Jacobs, Wang	Bones, DJ Swish, Lockhart, Jacobs, Wang	Bryan "Composer" Nelson, DJ Swish, Frans Mernick	2:19
3.	"I Don't Have It"	Ashton McCreight, Bones, Daniel Barry Shyman, Ray, Lockhart, Jacobs, Wang	Ashton McCreight, Bones, Daniel Barry Shyman, Ray, Lockhart, Jacobs, Wang	August 08, Ashton McCreight, Daniel Barry Shyman, Lockhart, Ray	3:07
4.	"Power"	Bones, Jacobs, Tal Halperin, Wang	Bones, Jacobs, Tal Halperin, Wang	August 08, Halp	3:10
5.	"Blackout"	Blaise Railey, Valenzuela, Ray, Wang	Valenzuela, Ray, Wang	Blaise Railey, Valenzuela, Ray	2:36
6.	"In My Bed"	Gregory "Aldae" Hein, Capi, Wang, Jonathan L. Wienner, Sam Homaee	Gregory "Aldae" Hein, Capi, Wang, Jonathan L. Wienner, Sam Homaee	Capi, The Roommates	2:18
7.	"The Moment"	Alda Agustiano, Antoine Norwood, Wang, Rogét Chahayed, Taylor Dexter, Wesley Singerman	Alda Agustiano, Antoine Norwood, Wang, Rogét Chahayed, Taylor Dexter, Wesley Singerman	Chong The Nomad, Rogét Chahayed, Taylor Dexter, Wesley Singerman	2:16
8.	"Vibes"	Brian Keenan, Chris Miles, Ray, Marcus Rivers, Wang	Brian Keenan, Chris Miles, Ray, Marcus Rivers, Wang	Bamby H2O, Brian Keenan, Ray	2:39
Total length:					21:37
