= GBAD (song) =

Song by Jackson Wang

from the album Magic Man 2
- Released: March 28, 2025
- Recorded: 2025
- Genre: Alternative R&B
- Length: 3:11
- Label: Team Wang; 88rising
- Songwriter: Jackson Wang
- Lyricist: Jackson Wang
- Producers: Jackson Wang; Dem Jointz

Jackson Wang singles chronology
"High Alone" (2025)	"GBAD" (2025)	"Buck" (2025)

Music video
- "GBAD" on YouTube

"GBAD" (an acronym for "Gotta Be a Dick") is a 2025 song by Hong Kong singer Jackson Wang. The song was released on March 28, 2025, as the second single from his third studio album, Magic Man 2 (2025). Produced by Dem Jointz, "GBAD" is an alternative R&B song with jazz blends, the song lyrically describes Wang setting personal boundaries in life.

A music video directed by Rich Lee was released on the same day as the song. It won the Bronze Award at the 2026 Clio Awards. The song also inspired several remixes produced by 88rising, most notably with Japanese boy band Number_i, which charted at no. 17 on the Oricon Combined Singles Chart and at no. 13 on the Billboard Japan Hot 100.

== Background and release ==
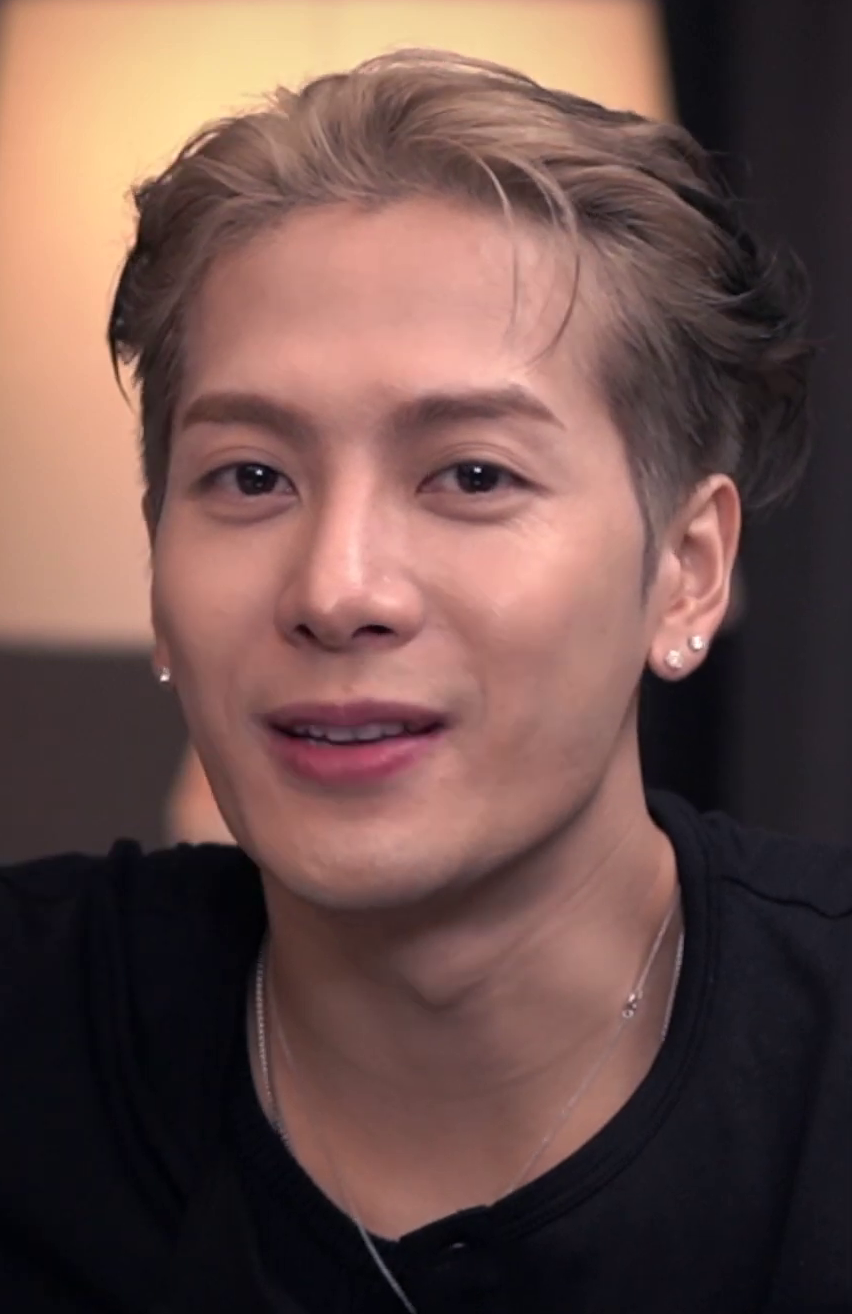
Jackson Wang (pictured in 2025) performed "GBAD."

"GBAD" was released on March 28, 2025, as Wang's second single from his third studio album, Magic Man 2 (2025). The songs on Magic Man 2 contained "deeply personal" themes and were meant as a continuation of Wang's Magic Man alter-ego that was introduced in Wang's previous studio album, Magic Man (2022). The promotional visual for the song depicted Wang in the "middle of a hollow body".

88rising, Wang's record label, collaborated and released several remixes of "GBAD" with F.Hero; JasonTheWeen; Bia, Youha & Milli; Ramengvrl & Warren Hue; and Number_i.

== Composition and lyrics ==
"Sometimes... we gotta be a dick. Not to harm, but to set boundaries and protect our own will."

— Wang on "GBAD"

Produced by Dem Jointz, "GBAD" is an alternative R&B song blending jazz instrumentals. Lyrically, the song is about establishing personal boundaries and "putting yourself first" even with criticism from others. In an interview with L'Officiel Malaysia, Wang explained the lyrics depicted that sometimes people "have no choice but to be the bad guy" in light of others taking advantage. Rolling Stone India described the song as relating to Wang's personal experiences, where he felt that he had to "cope with expectations" of other people. This is expressed in the song's chorus, "Life is great / Just gotta be a dick sometimes."

== Reception ==
Rolling Stone India regarded "GBAD" as a "powerful artistic statement" and described it as "going against social norms" and "valuing self-respect".

== Music video ==
The music video for "GBAD" was directed by Rich Lee and released on March 28, 2025, the same day as the song's release. The music video depicts Wang as his alter-ego Magic Man, who is constantly called upon for help by the citizens in a "picture-perfect" town, only for his efforts to go "underappreciated". By May 2025, the music video had reached over 31 million views. It won the Bronze Award at the 2026 Clio Awards in the music video category.

== Number_i remix ==
A remix for "GBAD" featuring the Japanese boy band Number_i was globally released on digital music platforms on April 16, 2025, to promote Magic Man 2 in Japan. Wang, who had previously performed with Number_i at Coachella 2024, had wanted to collaborate with them and promote in Japan. As creating a new song would take time, Wang instead decided to create a remix of one of his existing songs. Their vocals were recorded remotely, with Number_i recording the song in Japan while Wang recorded it in Shanghai, China. Number_i wrote their own rap verses, and Wang described their vocals as "appealing". In Japan, the Number_i remix charted at no. 17 on the Oricon Combined Singles Chart and at no. 13 on the Billboard Japan Hot 100.

=== Music video ===
A new music video was shot for "GBAD (Number_i remix)". The video was released on April 21, 2025. It featured Wang and the members of Number_i dressed in suits and spending time together at a port, filmed with "retro visuals."

=== Charts ===
Chart (2025)	Peak position
Japan Combined Singles (Oricon)	17
Japan (Japan Hot 100)	13
