= Jackson Wang =

Hong Kong rapper (born 1994)

- 王嘉爾
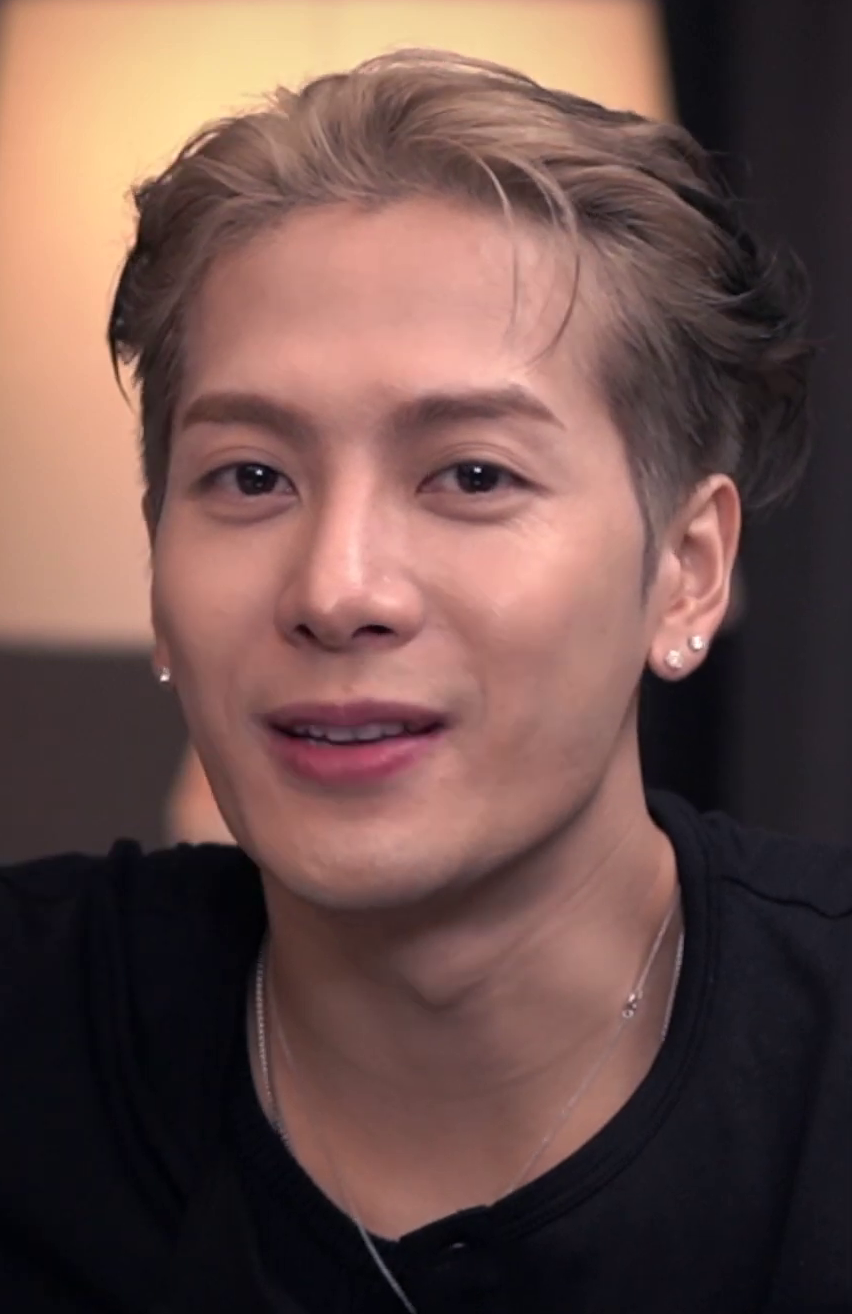
- Wang in 2025
- Born: Wang Ka-yee; 28 March 1994 (age 32); Kowloon Tong, British Hong Kong
- Other name: Wang Jia'er
- Occupations: Rapper; singer; songwriter; dancer; television host; fashion designer; creative director
- Father: Wang Ruiji
- Relatives: Zhou Yongchang (maternal grandfather)
- Musical career
- Genres: K-pop; hip-hop; R&B
- Instruments: Vocals
- Years active: 2014–present
- Labels: Team Wang; 88rising; JYP; Epic
- Member of: Got7
- Website: Official website

Chinese name
- Traditional Chinese: 王嘉爾
- Simplified Chinese: 王嘉尔
Transcriptions
Standard Mandarin
- Hanyu Pinyin: Wáng Jiā'ěr
Yue: Cantonese
- Jyutping: Wong4 Gaa1-yi5

Korean name
- Hangul: 왕잭슨
Transcriptions
- Revised Romanization: Wang Jaekseun
- McCune–Reischauer: Wang Chaeksŭn

Signature
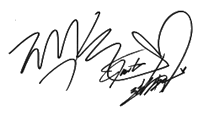

Jackson Wang (Chinese: 王嘉爾; born Wang Ka-yee; 28 March 1994) is a Hong Kong rapper, singer, and songwriter. After a career as a competitive fencer, he joined the South Korean boy band Got7, which debuted under JYP Entertainment in 2014. He founded the Chinese record label Team Wang in 2017, serving as the creative director and lead designer for its subsidiary fashion brand Team Wang Design. Wang released his first solo album Mirrors in 2019, which peaked at number 32 on the US Billboard 200, followed by his second album Magic Man in 2022, which peaked at number 15. His third album Magic Man 2 (2025) reached number 13.

Wang was ranked 40th on the Forbes China Celebrity 100 in 2019, 41st in 2020, and 10th in 2021. As of July 2025, Jackson Wang has 33.3 million followers on Instagram, ranking first among Chinese celebrities. He also has a large fan base on platforms such as YouTube and Spotify, and is the fastest Chinese artist to reach 10 million views on Vevo.

== Life and career ==
=== 1994–2011: Early life and fencing career ===
Wang was born in Kowloon Tong, Hong Kong, on 28 March 1994. He was raised into a family of athletes: his father Wang Ruiji was an Olympian fencer, his mother Zhou Ping was a gymnast of the Chinese national team, and his older brother Winston, born in 1986, did gymnastics and played rugby. At the age of seven, Wang started learning gymnastics floor exercises from his mother, but three years later, despite having been selected for the Hong Kong team, he gave up because it was hindering his height growth. He moved to fencing after his father took him to see the national team training and after taking an enrichment class in primary school. For the next two or three years, his father, who at the time was the Hong Kong team's head coach, taught him the basics, then Wang was selected for the youth fencing team and began formal training.

At the age of twelve, he participated in the national games and won his first gold medal. In 2010, he finished fifth at the Senior World Satellite Cup and third at the Asian Junior and Cadet Championships; he was ranked number one in cadet and junior sabre in Hong Kong, and in youth sabre in Asia, and number 11 in world junior sabre. As part of the Hong Kong national fencing team, he won in total 1 Asian gold medal, 3 national gold medals, and 9 internationals and Hong Kong gold medals, including first place at the Asian Junior and Cadet Fencing Championship in 2011. During his career as a fencer, he lived in Budapest, Hungary, from the age of 13 to 16, and in Shanghai, Guangzhou, Sicily, Copenhagen and Ireland.

Wang became interested in music in his sixth grade after his mother bought him a DVD of a Michael Jackson concert to entertain him while he was sick; he ended up watching it over and over again for four or five days. He then joined the American International School dance club, performing "Where is the Love?" by the Black Eyed Peas in the school talent competition, which made him contemplate a future as a singer. He has stated multiple times that even during fencing tournaments, he had always felt like he was performing and putting on a show. His love for music also prompted him to try composing his own music with GarageBand.

Wang was first approached by an idol scout who was looking for members for Exo-M at the Beijing Olympics in 2008. In 2010, while playing basketball at his school, he was noticed by a representative of South Korean talent agency JYP Entertainment and invited to participate in the global auditions in Kowloon, which Wang did despite never having taken vocal lessons. Five months later, in December 2010, it was announced that he passed the audition, ranking first out of 2,000 applicants. At that time, Wang was preparing for the Asian Junior and Cadet Fencing Championship and the 2012 London Olympics, and his parents told him they would give him permission to go only if he won the championship. After winning the gold medal, he moved to Seoul, South Korea for his K-pop training in July 2011. He dropped out of school and turned down two scholarships offered by the Hong Kong University and Stanford University for fencing as a result of the successful audition.

=== 2013–2016: Debut with Got7 and solo activities ===
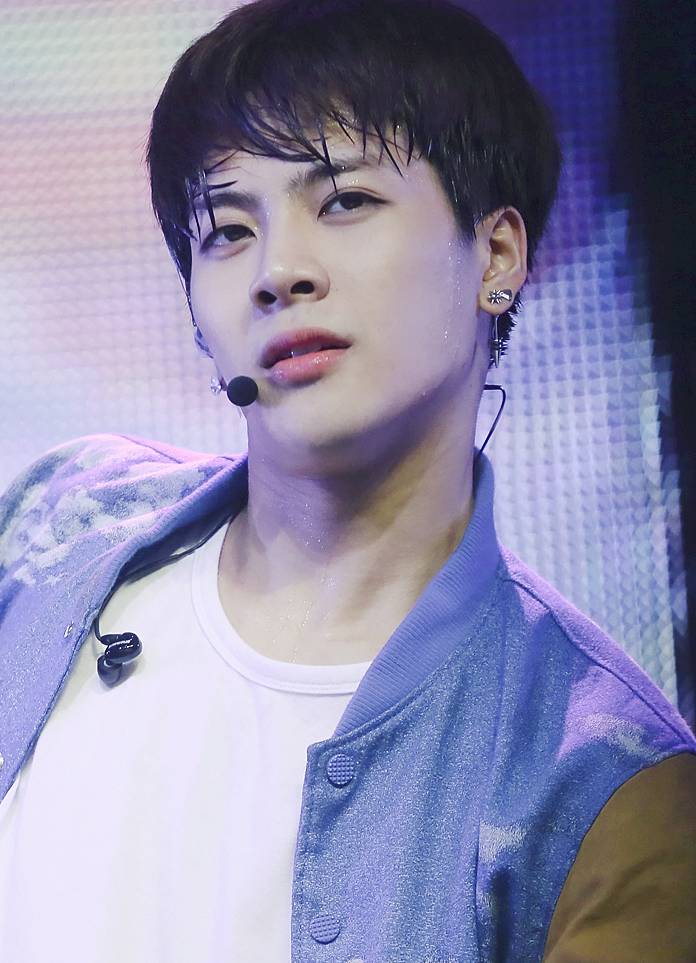
Wang at Got7's showcase in June 2014

In 2013, Wang made an appearance on the reality survival program Win: Who Is Next. The program was a competition between YG Entertainment trainees and JYPE trainees. Wang appeared alongside fellow trainees Mark, Yugyeom, and BamBam, who were then selected as members of Got7. The group released its first single, "Girls Girls Girls," of its debut EP Got It? on 16 January 2014.

In September 2014, Wang joined his first variety show, SBS' Roommate, as a member in its second season. Wang was later awarded the Newcomer Award at the 2014 SBS Entertainment Awards. He subsequently appeared on several other Korean variety shows such as Law of the Jungle, Happy Together, Radio Star, Problematic Men, Our Neighborhood Arts and Physical Education, Saturday Night Live Korea, A Look At Myself, and others. On 12 May 2015, Wang was appointed as a new MC for SBS' music show Inkigayo.

In December 2015, despite having no experience, Wang started hosting Go Fridge, the Chinese version of the show Please Take Care of My Refrigerator, alongside He Jiong. He hosted the show for seven seasons, and also wrote the lyrics, composed, and arranged the theme song for the show in seasons 2 and 3. In March 2016, Wang was appointed as MC for Fresh Sunday, a show on Hunan TV. He received praise from Chinese viewers for his wit and sense of humor, rising as a variety show star.

On 29 April 2016, Got7 held their first concert in Seoul, where Wang performed his self-composed songs "I Love It" and "WOLO". In July 2016, Wang appeared on the Chinese reality TV series, Fighting Man. At the end of the year he was named Variety Star of the Year at the Tencent Variety Show Star Awards and Popular Artist of the Year at the Sina Weibo Awards. He was one of the busiest K-pop idols of the year, constantly flying between South Korea, China and Japan.

=== 2017–2020: Early musical releases and Mirrors ===
In June 2017, Wang founded Team Wang for his solo activities in China and established a partnership with Snake or the Rabbit, a distribution company based in the United States; however, as he was still under JYPE, he couldn't promote nor release his solo music in South Korea and in Japan. In July he released his first self-written, self-composed solo song, "Generation 2". His first English-language single titled "Papillon" was released on 26 August and debuted at No. 1 on the Billboard China V Chart on the week of 16 September. On 30 August, he released "Novoland: The Castle in the Sky" (Chinese: 九州天空城), the theme song for iOS game Novoland: The Castle in the Sky 3D, breaking away from hip-hop and making a first try with melodious and classical music.

In September, Wang dropped out of Got7 activities in Japan due to health concerns and conflicting schedules. Throughout a year, he'd spend half of his time in China for his solo stuff, and half in Korea with the group. On 30 November, he released his second solo single, "Okay": similar to "Papillon", he wrote the lyrics, and composed and arranged the song together with Boytoy. In December, he was named the Breakthrough Singer of the Year at the Tencent Video Star Awards.

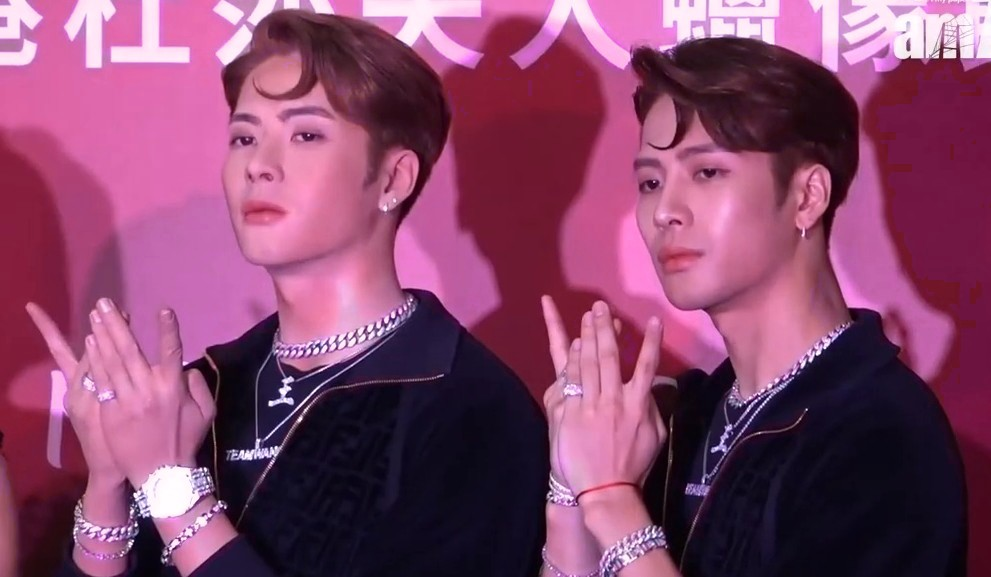
Wang with his wax figure at Madame Tussauds Hong Kong, 30 July 2019

On 20 April 2018, Wang released his third self-written single, "Dawn of Us", which speaks of appreciating the present and living with enthusiasm. His subsequent release "Fendiman", a collaboration with Fendi China, appeared at No. 1 on both the iTunes Singles chart and the iTunes Pop chart in the United States, making Wang the first Chinese solo artist to achieve that feat. In August 2018, he was awarded the Next Big Thing award at 2018 Teen Choice Awards. On 22 October, Wang signed with Canxing Culture to enter the international market; the following month, he released "Different Game", featuring Gucci Mane.

In March 2019, Wang performed a show titled "328 Journey Festival" at the Beijing Olympics Sports Center, selling out 5,000 tickets in 98 seconds. On 24 September, he released "Bullet to the Heart", the first single from his first album Mirrors. The song debuted at No. 1 on the Billboard China chart. The second single "Dway!" was published on 22 October. Mirrors, for which Wang supervised the whole process, and was personally involved in arrangements, lyrics writing, and music video shooting, was released on 25 October, reaching No. 32 on the Billboard 200 and becoming the highest-charting debut album for a Chinese artist in the history of the chart.

On 20 March 2020, Wang released the self-written single "100 Ways", mixing western and Chinese culture. It became the first song by a Chinese and K-pop solo artist to debut on Mediabase's U.S. Top 40 radio chart: it entered the chart in May, ranking 39th, and maintained its spot with a steady rise, ranking #24 on 19 July. On 7 July, Wang launched his fashion brand Team Wang Design, for which he served as the designer and creative director, after three years of development. On 4 September, he released the EDM single "Pretty Please", a collaboration with Swedish duo Galantis. He was behind the whole planning and editing of the music video, which paid homage to Hong Kong's love movies from the 90s, and directed it with Conglin. On 5 September, it was announced that Wang had invested in esports organization Victory Five. In December 2020, he released the Chinese-language single "Should've Let Go" with JJ Lin.

At the end of the year, Wang ranked 41st on Forbes China Celebrity 100 list.

=== 2021–2023: Departure from JYPE and Magic Man ===
In January 2021, Wang, along with the other six members of Got7, chose not to renew his contract with JYP Entertainment. Wang relocated to Beijing, while he partnered with Sublime Artist Agency for activities in South Korea, and Team Wang started to run his international activities. Later that month, he released the self-produced Chinese single, "Alone."

In March 2021, Wang was featured on three new singles: "Magnetic" by Rain, "So Bad" by Vava, and "M.I.A." by Afgan. On 26 March, he released his new English single, "LMLY", which was included in Teen Vogue's list of the best K-pop songs of 2021. He performed the song at the Harper's Bazaar Fashion Icons Party, where he was named Musician of the Year. In June 2021, Wang ranked in the top 10 on Forbes China Celebrity 100 list and was listed on Tatler Hong Kong Asia's Most Influential individuals in the culture field. The following month, he began serving as a mentor on the Tencent variety show, Girls Like Us. His next single "Drive You Home" was released on 29 July in collaboration with Internet Money. In August 2021, Wang announced hip-hop group Panthepack under Team Wang, consisting of himself, rapper Ice, J.Sheon, and Karencici. Their single "Buzz" was released on 28 August, followed by their 10-track debut album, The Pack, in September.

Throughout 2021, Wang was honored with numerous awards, including Best Male Artist of the Year at the NetEase Indie Music Awards, Most Influential Male Singer in Asia at the Chinese Top Ten Awards, and Best Original Music Award for the single "Alone" at the Global Chinese Music event.

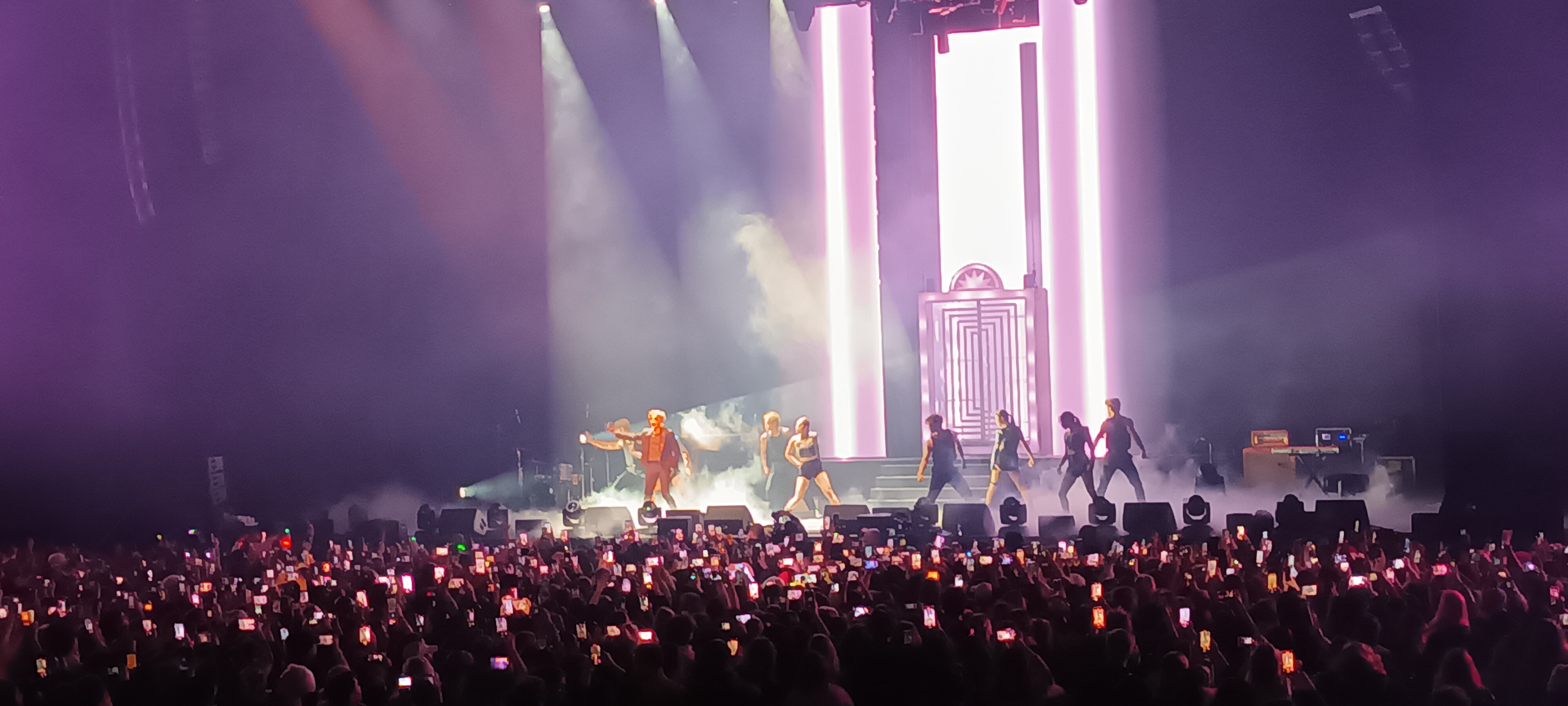
Wang performing in Paris in January 2023

On 31 March 2022, the singer released "Blow", which preceded the release of his full album Magic Man. On 16 April, he performed at Coachella with "100 Ways", "Blow" and the unreleased song "Cruel". In May 2022, he joined Got7 to release the eponymous extended play. On 12 July, he held a one-hour long show at Rajamangala Stadium, opening the football match between Manchester United and Liverpool. Magic Man was released on 9 September 2022, and debuted at No. 15 on the Billboard 200 in the US, also ranking third on the Top Album Sales and on the Top Current Album Sales. The album was promoted through a world tour that started in Bangkok on 26 November, selling out shows in Bangkok, Kuala Lumpur, Singapore, London and Paris. After the Asian and European stops, the tour continued in North America, Mexico and South America.

On 17 April 2023, he presented a short snippet of his collaboration with Ciara, "Slow", which was released on the same day. Since December 2023, Wang was forced into hiatus to address his depression and mental exhaustion.

=== 2024–present: Magic Man 2 ===
On 14 April 2024, Wang appeared onstage at Coachella again, performing "Feeling Lucky" with Bibi, which was released the following 26 April. At the beginning of 2025 he joined Got7 to commemorate their eleventh anniversary with the release of the extended play Winter Heptagon, for which he co-wrote the song "Smooth".

On 18 July 2025, he released his third album Magic Man 2, which was anticipated by the singles "High Alone", "GBAD", "Buck" and "Hate to Love". Magic Man 2 debuted at number 13 on the Billboard 200, becoming the highest-charting album by a Chinese artist in the chart's history. The omonymous world tour started in Bangkok, Thailand, on 3 October. On 5 and 8 December, Wang performed at iHeartRadio's Jingle Ball Tour in Los Angeles and Chicago, respectively.

On 21 September 2026, Wang released a single "Thank You" along with a MV filmed entirely on the iPhone 18 Pro as a tribute song to his fans, and revealed he had signed with Jay Z's Roc Nation for management. In November, he signed with WME for representation in various fields.

== Artistry ==
Wang has named Michael Jackson, Prince, Omarion, Chris Brown, and Post Malone as his sources of inspiration. As a teen, he listened to Eason Chan, Justin Lo, American rap, French music, and BigBang. In 2018, he began writing lyrics, music, and arrangements for his own songs. For his first solo releases, he drew from the hip-hop/rap genre, influenced by the music of G-Unit, Snoop Dogg, and The Notorious B.I.G., which he listened to while preparing for fencing matches, and frequently collaborated with producer Boytoy. He experimented with different musical genres until his first studio album Magic Man (2022), which Wang considered helped him find his sound. With time, he reached a distinctive blend of pop, hip-hop, and R&B.

In a 2018 interview with Hypebeast, Wang stressed the importance of writing the lyrics for every song, explaining: "If one day you are no longer as popular as you are now, the people around you today may leave you. Therefore, I have always insisted on making the melody, beats and lyrics myself. Only in this way I can continue to improve and become irreplaceable."

While still actively promoting with Got7 in his twenties, he worked as an on-set assistant for film director Ojun Kwon in his free time, learning how to direct; thus, Wang tends to write the script and direct his music videos to clearly deliver his vision. He first directed the music video for "Pretty Please" in 2020.

== Public image ==
Wang has often been referred to as a "social butterfly" in social media discussions, although he has shared that he doesn't have many friends. Those who have worked with him have described him as genuine, polite, courteous, and thorough in his work, rarely showing any bad temper, and stated that his social, energetic and positive personality made him an easy person to communicate with. Wang attributes his work ethic of always doing his best and strive for perfection to his past as a fencer.

In 2015, he started working solo for the first time in the talk show Go Fridge, subsequently appearing in a wide range of variety shows. Wang has stated that variety shows had been the only way, as a foreigner, to make himself known in South Korea and abroad, and build a reputation so that people would listen to his music, but that in the long run, they had made him lose sight of his goal to become a musician. As he wasn't recognized for his music and couldn't overcome this hurdle, he frequently wore a cap on stage to hide his face. He started distancing himself from TV appearances in 2018 as he no more wanted to be stereotyped as a comedian.

== Endorsements ==
In December 2016, Wang's first solo commercial for Midea was released in China. After establishing his own studio Team Wang in 2017, Wang began endorsing beverages, clothing brands and electronics, which include Pepsi, Snow Beer, VIVO X21, Adidas, Douyin Application, Lenovo in China, and Hogan in Hong Kong. He terminated his working relationship with Adidas in March 2021, after their previously made public statement regarding alleged forced labour in the cotton-producing region of Xinjiang resurfaced.

Wang attended the 2017 MTV Europe Music Awards as an ambassador of Great China on 12 November. On 13 November, he was appointed as Alibaba Group Tmall Global's Chief Wonderful Goods Officer.

On 9 February 2018, Wang was appointed as envoy of Hong Kong Tourism. In 2019, he became the new ambassador of Fendi China, Cartier, and Armani Beauty. In March 2020, Fendi launched its first ever velvet collection called "Fendi X Jackson Wang Capsule Collection", for which Wang designed clothes, shoes and accessories, which sold out immediately after the launch.

In 2020, he was the new face of L'Oréal Paris Men Expert and Ray-Ban, while in 2022, he partnered with the Singapore Tourism Board for the SingapoReimagine global marketing campaign.

In January 2023, he was appointed as brand ambassador for Louis Vuitton. He was also named ambassador for Thai brand C2, joining their campaigns over the years to deliver clean drinking water to communities and the underprivileged, and to aid charitable organizations focused on child welfare and disability care.

In 2024, Wang became one of Hennessy's global brand ambassadors, and released the song "Henny" on 22 May for the launch of the Hennessy V.S.O.P Night Blaze bottle. At the end of the year, he signed with Nike & Jordan as a global brand partner and creative director. In 2025, he became Asia-Pacific brand ambassador for Japanese suncare brand Anessa, and global ambassador for Chinese skincare company Kans.

In February 2026, Wang became an ambassador for the Hong Kong International Airport. In April 2026, Chinese sugar-free chewing gum brand Stride announced Wang as its new global ambassador. In July 2026, he became FIE first ever global ambassador to promote the Los Angeles Olympic Games 2028.

== Personal life ==
Wang attended a public school in Hong Kong, but his lively personality led him to constantly eat and talk during class, prompting his teachers to suspect ADHD and suggest his mother take him to a doctor. He later transferred to the American International School where the educational approach allowed for more freedom of expression. He dropped out of school to move to South Korea and never graduated.

Because of his work in the entertainment industry in China, Korea and the rest of the world, Wang is proficient in a number of languages; he can fluently speak and understand Mandarin, Cantonese, Korean, and English, as well as the Shanghai dialect. In 2025 he shared that he was studying Japanese.

In August 2019, Wang uploaded a photo of the Chinese flag and declared himself as "one of 1.4 billion guardians of the Chinese flag" on his official Weibo account, after a People's Republic of China flag was removed and tossed into the Victoria Harbour during the 2019–20 Hong Kong protests. In a January 2020 interview with Forbes, Wang introduced himself as "Jackson Wang from China" and stated: "My goal is just to put my name out on the table just to let everybody to get to know me. I want to ... let people know that Chinese kids are working on good music too."

In January 2025, he donated ¥1 million yuan to the China Foundation for Rural Development to help those affected by the Tibet earthquake. In April 2025, he donated US$100,000 towards earthquake relief to Thailand in light of the 2025 Myanmar earthquake, namely to the Rajaprajanugroh Foundation, Friends in Need (of "PA") Volunteers Foundation Thai Red Cross and Gun Jom Phalang Foundation. In November 2025, he donated HK$1,000,000 to help those affected in the Wang Fuk Court fire.

== Discography ==
- Mirrors (2019)
- Magic Man (2022)
- Magic Man 2 (2025)

== Tours ==
- Magic Man World Tour (2022–2024)
- Magic Man 2 World Tour (2025–2026)

== Filmography ==
=== Television series ===
Year	Title	Role	Notes	Ref.
2015	Dream Knight	Jackson		
2015	The Producers	Himself	Cameo	
2018	2018 Bring Music Home: Perky Parents	Ah Sheng		

=== Variety shows ===
Year	Title	Role	Notes	Ref.
2013	WIN: Who is Next	Contestant	Rap and dance battle (Episode 4)	
2014	Roommate	Cast member	Season 2	
2014	Hitmaker	Cast member	Season 1 with VIXX's N, Hyuk, and BTOB's Sungjae	
2015	Law of the Jungle	Cast member	in Nicaragua (Episodes 178–180)	
2015–2016	Inkigayo	Host	from April 2015 to August 2016	
2016	Real Men	Cast member	for Friendly Enlisting Special with Got7's BamBam	
2016	Go Fridge	Co-host	with He Jiong (Season 1–2)	
2016	Fresh Sunday	Co-host	with He Jiong	
2016	Fighting Man	Cast member		
2016	Where Is My Friend's Home	Cast member	with Got7's BamBam for episodes in Thailand	
2016	Celebrity Bromance	Cast member	Season 5 with Jooheon of Monsta X Chuseok Special with Ahn Hyo-seop	
2016	Top Surprise	Co-host	with He Jiong and Wei Daxun	
2016	Weekly Idol	Corner host	"Idols are the Best" corner (Episodes 246–278)	
2017	Go Fridge	Co-host	with He Jiong (Season 3)	
2018	Go Fridge	Co-host	with He Jiong (Season 4)	
2018	Idol Producer	Cast member	rap mentor	
2018	Hot Blood Dance Crew	Cast member	dance mentor	
2018	Let Go of My Baby	Cast member		
2018	Sound of My Dream 3	Cast member	judge	
2019	Go Fridge	Co-host	with He Jiong (Season 5)	
2019	Chuang	Cast member	judge	
2020	Go Fridge	Co-host	with He Jiong (Season 6)	
2020	Street Dance of China 3	Cast member	team captain	
2021	Go Fridge	Co-host	with He Jiong (Season 7)	
2021	Girls Like Us	Cast member	label producer	
2021	Have Fun	Cast member		
2024	Chuang Asia: Thailand	Cast member	mentor	
