= Magic Man 2 =

- Digital cover

Studio album by Jackson Wang
- Released: July 18, 2025
- Genres: Funk; pop; contemporary R&B
- Length: 34:22
- Language: English
- Label: Team Wang

Jackson Wang chronology
Magic Man (2022)	Magic Man 2 (2025)

Singles from Magic Man 2
- 1. "High Alone" Released: February 12, 2025; 2. "GBAD" Released: March 28, 2025; 3. "Buck" Released: May 9, 2025; 4. "Hate to Love" Released: June 6, 2025; 5. "Made Me a Man" Released: July 18, 2025

Magic Man 2 is the third studio album by Hong Kong recording artist Jackson Wang. It was released on July 18, 2025.

== Background ==
I've never truly written an album for myself, but every track on Magic Man 2 reflects my most genuine feelings. I want to share this sincerity with you. This album is my outpouring to the world, and also a letter to myself. It documents how I navigated the ups and downs, and how I slowly recovered. Ultimately, that's just how life is. We can't control everything, but we can choose how we think and how we face it. Whether you've found your own standards or not, it's okay. It's okay to encounter setbacks, fall, and make mistakes. Life has its ups and downs. Live the life you choose, live your own magic, and find your own "Magic Man."

— Jackson Wang, L'Officiel HK, July 2025

Preparations for Magic Man 2 began in 2023, a year after the release of Wang's previous album, but in December 2023, the singer went on an eight-month hiatus for health reasons, taking time to recharge and reflect. The conclusions he reached were incorporated into Magic Man 2, which addresses the singer's need to be honest, real, and to talk about himself as a human being. Magic Man 2 discusses his experiences in the industry over the past decade and the people close to him, and develops the themes of loneliness and doubt introduced in Magic Man (2022), moving from betrayal to pain, from loneliness to acceptance, and finally moving on. Wang explained that he considers it important to talk about fears, address negative thoughts, and understand what they are trying to say.

The creative process began without a specific concept in mind in Japan, then continued in South Korea and Malaysia, and involved two-three other people besides Wang, who composed over 40–50 songs before choosing the ones that best captured the essence of his experiences and emotions. Sonically, it moves away from the pop hits that characterized Wang's early career as a K-pop artist and solo artist, featuring slower-paced pieces.

The album explores the singer's fluctuating relationship with his musical alter ego, Magic Man, a mask created in 2022 that symbolized his darkest emotions and inner conflicts, and comes to reveal his dark and toxic nature. It is divided into four chapters, namely "manic highs", "losing control", "realization" and "acceptance", in a journey akin to the grieving process in which one listens to their heart and comes to accept the good and the bad. The lyrics are taken from the diaries Wang wrote to vent his emotions about society, the music industry, human nature and reality, and reflect on who he really was.

"High Alone" states that the deepest wounds often come not from enemies, but from those we trust the most, exploring fragility, loneliness and heartbreak. "Not For Me" talks about rejection and self-esteem, while "Access" revolves around the themes of control and limits. "Buck" is a dance pop song featuring Indian artist Diljit Dosanjh, who raps in a mix of English and Punjabi. "GBAD" is an alternative R&B song with a jazzy arrangement that encourages people to set limits and put themselves first, without fear of criticism and misunderstanding, prioritizing self-care and mental health. "Hate to Love" is a dark song in which Wang talks about love and betrayal, written after realizing that he can only trust himself. "One Time" was written in a hotel room while the singer was always traveling; "Everything" is an internal dialogue between Jackson Wang and Magic Man and started from the question "I gave everything I had, so why am I still so unhappy? When I fall, who will catch me?". "Dear:" is a letter written to his parents and contains some of the most significant audio messages that Wang received from them in the last six or seven years. It serves as an introduction to "Sophie Ricky," a dedication to them and a reflection on the experiences of their youth. "Made Me a Man" conveys the message that everything he has experienced has shaped the person he is today and he is grateful for these experiences that have helped him grow and learn from his mistakes.

== Critical reception ==
India Today praised the album's sincere and mature lyrics, calling it "an emotional map from chaos to clarity, from rage to reflection."

== Track listing ==
All tracks are written by Jackson Wang.

Magic Man 2 track listing
No.	Title	Lyrics	Music	Length
1.	"High Alone"	Andre Wollrabe, Charles Martin, Dwyane Flaming	Andre Wollrabe, Charles Martin, Dwyane Flaming	3:13
2.	"Not For Me"	Sayak Das, Louis Bartolini, Alexis Andrea Boyd, Aaron Kim	Sayak Das, Louis Bartolini, Alexis Andrea Boyd, Aaron Kim	4:10
3.	"Access"	Dem Jointz, Sayak Das, Louis Bartolini, Alexis Andrea Boyd	Dem Jointz, Sayak Das, Louis Bartolini, Alexis Andrea Boyd	1:57
4.	"Buck" (feat. Diljit Dosanjh)	Dem Jointz, Alexis Andrea Boyd, Diljit Dosanjh, Sayak Das, Cheema Singh	Dem Jointz, Alexis Andrea Boyd, Sayak Das, Cheema Singh	2:43
5.	"GBAD"		Dem Jointz	3:10
6.	"Hate to Love"	Sayak Das, Louis Bartolini, Alexis Andrea Boyd	Sayak Das, Louis Bartolini, Alexis Andrea Boyd	3:07
7.	"One Time"			2:15
8.	"Everything"	Sayak Das, Louis Bartolini, Alexis Andrea Boyd, Michelle Oliveira	Sayak Das, Louis Bartolini, Alexis Andrea Boyd, Michelle Oliveira	4:12
9.	"Dear:"	Sayak Das, Louis Bartolini	Sayak Das, Louis Bartolini	2:51
10.	"Sophie Ricky"	Sayak Das, Louis Bartolini, Alexis Andrea Boyd, Aaron Kim	Sayak Das, Louis Bartolini, Alexis Andrea Boyd, Aaron Kim	3:29
11.	"Made Me a Man"	Sayak Das, Louis Bartolini, Alexis Andrea Boyd	Sayak Das, Louis Bartolini, Alexis Andrea Boyd	3:15
Total length:				34:22

Magic Man 2 Target edition bonus track
No.	Title	Lyrics	Length
12.	"Access" (Acapella)	Dem Jointz, Sayak Das, Louis Bartolini, Alexis Andrea Boyd	1:57

== Charts ==
Magic Man 2 debuted at number 13 on the Billboard 200 in the United States, becoming the highest-charting album by a Chinese artist in the chart's history. With over 32,000 copies sold, it also peaked at #4 on the Top Album Sales Chart, #3 on the Vinyl Albums Chart, and #2 on the Indie Store Album Sales Chart.

In South Korea, it debuted at #4 on the Circle Weekly Album Chart with 28,464 copies sold, reaching 38,874 copies by the end of August.

In the United Kingdom, it peaked at #7 on the Official Independent Album Breakers Chart, #23 on the Official Album Downloads Chart, and #44 on the Official Independent Albums Chart.

=== Weekly charts ===
Weekly chart performance for Magic Man 2
Chart (2025)	Peak position
Japan Digital Albums (Billboard Japan)	53
South Korean Albums (Circle)	4
UK Digital Albums (OCC)	23
US Billboard 200	13

=== Monthly charts ===
Monthly chart performance for Magic Man 2
Chart (2025)	Peak position
South Korean Albums (Circle)	19
