= Zhou Yongchang =

Chinese physician

Zhou Yongchang (Chinese: 周永昌; 1922–2017) was a Chinese physician and a pioneering sonographer in mainland China. Zhou was born in November, 1922 in Shanghai. Graduating from Tong De Medical College, he became a urologist. In the late 1950s, Zhou and his colleagues tried to apply industrial ultrasonic testing for medical diagnosis. In 1988, together with four other people, he was presented with the "History of Medical Ultrasound Pioneer Award" by the World Federation of Ultrasound in Medicine and Biology (WFUMB). He is the maternal grandfather of singer Jackson Wang.

Zhou died on 24 October 2017.
