= Fresh Sunday =

- Genre: Reality television
- Country of origin: China
- Original language: Mandarin
- No. of seasons: 1
- No. of episodes: 12

Production
- Running time: 90 minutes

Original release
- Network: Hunan Television

Fresh Sunday (Chinese: 透鲜滴星期天; pinyin: Tòu Xiān Dī Xīngqítiān) is a Chinese cooking-variety show hosted by popular host He Jiong and Chinese Got7 member Jackson Wang. It aired every Sunday on Hunan TV
