= Soccer Killer =

2017 Chinese-Hong Kong film by Jeffrey Lau

- Film poster
- Traditional Chinese: 仙球大戰
- Simplified Chinese: 仙球大战
- Directed by: Jeffrey Lau
- Written by: Jeffrey Lau
- Starring: He Jiong; Gillian Chung; Charlene Choi; Joey Yung; Patrick Tam
- Edited by: Wang Gaigai
- Production companies: Dandong Fenghuang Qianyi Film and Television Limited Company
- Distributed by: Aeon Pix Studios (India)
- Release date: 30 June 2017
- Running time: 84 minutes
- Countries: China; Hong Kong
- Language: Mandarin

Soccer Killer is a 2017 comedy film directed by Jeffrey Lau, and starring He Jiong, Gillian Chung, Charlene Choi, Joey Yung, and Patrick Tam.

== Cast ==
- He Jiong as Maocilang
- Gillian Chung as Princess Changping
- Charlene Choi
- Joey Yung
- Patrick Tam
- Stephy Tang
- Wang Xuebing
- Lam Chi-chung
- Jeffrey Lau

== Production ==
Principal photography started on April 8, 2014 in Hengdian World Studios and wrapped in May 2014.
