= Go Fridge =

- 拜托了冰箱
- Genre: Cooking Show; Talk Show
- Based on: Please Take Care of My Refrigerator
- Starring: He Jiong; Jackson Wang; Wei Daxun
- Country of origin: China
- Original languages: Primary: Mandarin; Secondary: Korean, English and other languages
- No. of seasons: 7
- No. of episodes: 70

Production
- Producer: Qiu Yue
- Production location: China
- Production company: Tencent Video

Original release
- Network: Tencent Video, Zhejiang TV
- Release: 3 August 2015 – 24 August 2021

Go Fridge (simplified Chinese: 拜托了冰箱; traditional Chinese: 拜託了冰箱; pinyin: Bàituōle bīngxiāng), also known as Play, Fridge, is a 2016 Chinese cooking show produced by Tencent Video. The show was host by He Jiong, Jackson Wang and Wei Daxun. The rights were bought from South Korean television series Please Take Care of My Refrigerator. It was listed in the 'Most Popular Chinese Variety Show'. The show features six chefs, two of whom compete in a timed cooking challenge using ingredients from the guest’s refrigerator.

== Plot ==
- Seasons 1–2

In each episode, two guests bring their refrigerators to the studio, discuss the contents, and select two chefs to create a dish in 15 minutes. The guest then picks the winning chef.

- Season 3

In season 3, two professional X-Factor chefs joined the six regular chefs. If they win two head-to-head battles, they can become regular chefs, like Jeffrey Chen. Unlike the first two seasons where chefs had to use a required extra ingredient, season 3 allows them to order any ingredient or utensil not in the kitchen, thanks to JD.com sponsorship. Winners receive a badge and a golden spoon with jade decorations.

- Season 4

The Chinese version features a new team format with four set areas. Jackson and a guest lead teams of rotating chefs, with a head chef chosen each episode. Teams use separate ingredients, and captains assist with prep only. He Jiong serves as referee. Winning head chefs earn a gold-and-diamond badge. Teams stay for two episodes; head chefs rotate.

- Season 5

In Season 5, Jackson and He Jiong become head chefs, competing in a replication challenge in Episode 1, which ends in a draw. Jackson also assists in the main competition alongside the guest not revealing a fridge. Teams are formed through dish names and random draws from Gemice ice cream cups. Menu rooms are now green rooms. Guests submit a meal video before filming. A “magnifying glass” shows fridge contents if only one fridge is present. In Episodes 3 and 5, rule issues led to ingredient isolation and a special shopping round featuring instant noodles.

- Season 6

Filming was delayed due to COVID-19 and travel restrictions, with Wei Daxun hosting the first six episodes. The set now has a Lego-style design with standardized fridges hidden between mascots Popo and Todi. Chefs wear show aprons only when cooking, and hands are sanitized before serving. Alcohol sponsors were paused until Episode 7. Lipton is the new beverage sponsor, and Mei Yi Tian Milk replaces Germice. Fridge contents are pre-analyzed, and the winning chef teaches the dish in their native language.

- Season 7

This season shifts to a relaxed “home party” format in a three-storey house, where guests team up with hosts to win ingredients through games. One or two returning chefs help the winners cook. New fixed members Nine, AK, and game planner Chen Ziming join Jackson and He Jiong. Each episode features a dish, dessert, or drink using sponsor Cha Li Wang’s beverage.

== Cast ==
=== Hosts ===
Name	Profession	Date of birth	Appearance
He Jiong	Host, actor	28 April 1974 (age 52)	1–present
Jackson Wang (Note: Singer from Hong Kong, member of South Korean group Got7. His mother in from Shanghai. Has allergic reactions to overly spicy foods, cheese lover.)	Singer, rapper	28 March 1994 (age 32)	1–50, 57–66, (Note: Absent for early half of Season 6 due to COVID-19 related travel restrictions from Korea.) 68, 70 5–6 (as guest)
Wei Daxun (Note: From Jilin Province. Substitute Host for when Jackson was a guest. He substituted again in 2020 as Jackson is stuck in South Korea. Unlike Jackson, he loves spicy foods. His new group name with He Jiong, He Wei, was rejected, as it was He Jiong's father's name (different characters). Therefore, Wei He (Why) was formed. As a sous chef, he has no finer knife skills (i.e. brunoise, chiffonade, julienne).)	Actor	12 April 1989 (age 37)	5–6, 51-56 37–38, 69 (as guest)

=== Attendees ===
Name	Profession	Appearance
Nine from INTO1	Singer, actor	61-64, 66-70
AK from INTO1	Rapper	61-64, 66-70
Chen Zi Ming	Host, singer	61-70

=== Chefs ===
Name	Profession	Appearance
Yao Weitao	Singer, chef (Note: Former hotel vegetable chef, from Shanghai, but is fluent in Korean. Specialize in sports nutritional statistics. During season 4, he was in the process of opening a new restaurant in Shanghai. However, in season 4, he has no grasp on the new equipments in the kitchen (deep fryer, commercial steamer, etc))	1–30, 33–34
Liu Kaile	Stylist (Note: From Hunan, 27 on debut. He beat Wei Han in the final casting before season 1. He was not picked to cook at all in season 3. Took leave of absence in season 4. As such, he had the longest gap between wins (between Ep. 7 of season 3 to Ep.8 of season 6, or 1057 days, or 151 weeks))	1–30, 41–42, 45–60, 64-65
Tian Shu	Actor, restaurant owner, chef (Note: Vegetarian, likes Chinese poetry and medicine. Building the first vegetarian restaurant in 2018. Worked in a hotel as a seafood chef. Due to his poetic language being unintelligible to Jackson, he was never picked as head chef until ep. 9 in season 4.)	1–32, 35–36, 39–40, 63, 66
Vinny Huang Yan	Head Chef, restaurant owner, Sake connoisseur (Note: From Beijing, Worked in Japan, fluent in Japanese, mostly made Japanese, Chinese French and Italian Cuisine. Known for his efficiency, speed and intricate knife skills. This is why he can still work well under An Yanmin despite their contrasting working styles and ideologies. He also has extremely high heat tolerance, often picking up hot foods with bare hands.)	1–34, 37–52, 55-60, 65, 70
An Xianmin	Restaurant owner and Head Chef (Note: Left-hander, Korean Restaurant owner from Busan. An Asian Fusion Chef, works in Beijing. His first mentor in Chinese Cuisine was a descendant of the recipe for Kung Pao Chicken. Known to be the slowest cook, likes to squeeze every second of cook time, tendency to flambé and high head tolerance and intricate sauce combinations. He also became an internet chef after season 4.)	1–52, 55–60
Hu Shasha	Singer (Note: From Tianjin. Written and performed the theme song for the second season, can speak basic Korean, An Xianmin's culinary student.)	1–30, 33–34, 37–38
Jeffrey Chen Ruijie	Restaurant owner, Bartender (Note: Gemini from Shanghai, but also has American citizenship. Likes East-Western fusion and dietetics. Forms rivalry with Yao Weitao that if they face each other in the future, the loser may leave the show, but the rivalry was on hold in season 4 due to a change in format. First X-Chef in season 3 to be promoted to regular chef after being picked to cook and win both shows in his round as X-Chef. He also became the first former X-Chef to be picked as Head Chef in season 4. Great at changing methods of cooking on the fly.)	25–26 (as X-Chef) 27–44, 47–50, 53–54, 70
Laura Luo La	Food research and developer	31–32 (as Guest Chef) 33–50, 53–54, 59–60, 68
Li Yang	Chef	41–42, 45–48 (as Guest Chef) 51–60
Yang Bei Cun	Executive Chef and Restaurant Owner (Note: Southerner, executive chef in a Shanghai haute cuisine fusion restaurant. Known as "Mini Li Dan" due to their resemblance. Known to be a nomad, as he never stayed in one residence for more than three years in his lifetime.)	43–46 (as Guest Chef) 51–58
Ming Liang	Restaurant Owner, Sous Chef, Singer (Note: A third-generation owner of a family-owned restaurant and preserved foods business. Known for his precise knife skills and artistic food sculptures. He is in the same agency as Tao competing in The Next Top Bang. On episode 61, he became the first newcomer to defeat an original chef on his first appearance and first episode of a season.)	51–56, 59–60
Dong Yanlei	Model, Actor, Self-taught Saucier (Note: Born in 1996 self-taught saucier, from Shandong Province, made his own version of Lao Gan Ma Chilli sauce. He passed audition in this show by showing off his abilities in stretching Chinese noodles from scratch. He participated in Idol Producer as a model trainee, and finished in 37th place. As Jackson was the rap instructor for the season. The two couldn't reunite. He's also a gamer and impulse-buyer.)	51–60, 69
Arnold Lin Yuzhi	Rapper, Singer-songwriter, Former lobster barbeque shop owner (Note: Was a contestant in Super Idol 3 and Idol Producer season 2 (31st place). From Canton of Teochew descent. Despite increasingly known for his speed-rapping, he aspires to retire early and have a slower pace in life. Known for his black gloves, beanie, poker face at work and multitasking on the stoves because he used to own a lobster barbeque shop.)	55–58
Liang Yanwei	Actor	61-62

== Episodes ==
=== Series overview ===
Season	Episodes	Originally aired	
Season	Episodes	First aired	Last aired
Season 1	10	3 December 2015	3 February 2016
Season 2	10	18 May 2016	27 July 2016
Season 3	10	12 April 2017	15 June 2017
Season 4	10	25 April 2018	27 June 2018
Season 5	10	10 April 2019	15 June 2019
Season 6	10	28 April 2020	30 June 2020
Season 7	10	22 June 2021	24 August 2021

Seasons 2-6 have 11 total episodes because of the special.

=== Season 1 ===
List of episodes in Season 1 (1-10)

Episode #	Broadcast Date	Guest(s)
1	3 December 2015	Zheng Kai, Chen Xiao
2	10 December 2015	Zheng Kai, Chen Xiao
3	17 December 2015	(Taiwan) Hannah Quinlivan, (Note: Tetra-racial. Wife of Jay Chou. Have both Australian-Danish and Taiwanese-Korean descent.) Wei Chen
4	23 December 2015	(Taiwan) Hannah Quinlivan, Wei Chen
5	30 December 2015	(Taiwan) Michelle Chen, (Hong Kong) Jackson Wang
6	6 January 2016	(Taiwan) Michelle Chen, (Hong Kong) Jackson Wang
7	13 January 2016	Wowkie Zhang, (Note: Punk band frontman, Actor, Host.) Shen Mengchen (Note: Actress, Host, gained fame as 'Managers' of various singers in the Chinese I Am A Singer series)
8	20 January 2016	Wowkie Zhang, Shen Mengchen
9	27 January 2016	(South Korea) Taeyeon, (South Korea) Jung Yonghwa (Note: Filmed in the original set in Korea.)
10	3 February 2016	(South Korea) Taeyeon, (South Korea) Jung Yonghwa

=== Season 2 ===
List of episodes in Season 2 (11-20)

Episode #	Broadcast Date	Guest(s)
11	18 May 2016	Sa Beining, Zeng Shunxi
12	25 May 2016	Sa Beining, Zeng Shunxi
Special	1 June 2016	None (Note: The cast of Go Fridge head to Korea to visit GOT7 during their concert (JB was absent due to injury), and also behind the scenes of Are You Normal recordings.)
13	8 June 2016	Joker Xue, Li Xiaolu
14	15 June 2016	Joker Xue, Li Xiaolu
15	22 June 2016	Song Jia, Bao Bei'er
16	29 June 2016	Song Jia, Bao Bei'er
17	6 July 2016	Liu Haoran, Du Haitao
18	13 July 2016	Liu Haoran, Du Haitao
19	20 July 2016	(South Korea) Song Jihyo, (South Korea) Kang Gary
20	27 July 2016	(South Korea) Song Jihyo, (South Korea) Kang Gary

=== Season 3 ===
List of episodes in Season 3 (21-30)

Episode #	Broadcast Date	Guest(s)	X-Chefs
21	12 April 2017	Xie Na, (Note: Jason Zhang's wife, who was not pregnant at the time of recording, she gave birth to twin girls before season 4 when Jason appeared on the show.) (Taiwan) Kevin Tsai	(Hong Kong) Dai Long, (Note: Hong Kong Chef of Teochew descent. Known as God of Cookery because the movie is based on his real-life story of gaining Le Cordon Bleu certification and the rebuilding of his crumbling business empire) (Hong Kong) Gu Zhihui (Note: Hong Kong chef and CEO of Peking Kitchen)
22	19 April 2017	Xie Na, (Taiwan) Kevin Tsai	(Hong Kong) Dai Long, (Hong Kong) Gu Zhihui
23	26 April 2017	"Bring your kids to work" special Li Xiang, (Note: TV host) (Note: Angela Wang, child-model. Daughter of Li Xiang from her second marriage.) Sha Yi, (Note: Actor, best known as a main antagonist in many films.) Angus Sha (Note: Eldest son.)	(Malaysia) Samantha Lee, (Note: Food blogger, gained attention due to her postings of her kid's meal online) Li Ying (Note: Restaurateur, opened Shanghai's first western restaurant targeted at children. He shares the exact same name and characters as his wife.)
24	3 May 2017	"Bring your kids to work" special Li Xiang, Sha Yi, Angus Sha	(Malaysia) Samantha Lee, Li Ying
25	10 May 2017	Cao Yunjin, (Note: Xiangsheng Comedian) Zhang Shaogang (Note: TV Host, News critic, Media studies professor.)	Jeffrey Chen, Wei Han (Note: Season 1 winner of MasterChef China and has a certificate from Le Cordon Bleu. He was a French-speaking tour guide. He lost to Liu Kaile in the final casting for regular chefs in season 1 of the show. He lost again because Jeffrey Chen won twice in the round and was promoted.)
26	17 May 2017	Cao Yunjin, Zhang Shaogang	Jeffrey Chen, Wei Han
27	24 May 2017	Chen He, (Note: Comedic actor) Lou Yixiao (Note: Singer, Actress)	Holly He (Note: Former tax accountant, painter, now a food blogger and cook, Le Cordon Bleu Graduate) (Note: Since Jeffrey Chen was picked to cook in both episodes of the last round and won both times, he was promoted to become a regular chef. He is a restaurateur and bartender from Shanghai.)
28	31 May 2017	Chen He, Lou Yixiao	Holly He
29	8 June 2017	Yao Chen, (Note: Actress) Wang Luodan (Note: Actress, Singer)	(France) Anaud (Note: Restaurateur from Provence, France, met his wife in London and married in her hometown in Beijing. He was the only X-Chef that was not picked to cook in the round, and performed sabering champagne in the special.)
30	15 June 2017	Yao Chen, Wang Luodan	(France) Anaud
Special (Note: At the beginning of season 3, it was revealed that He Jiong lives alone and doesn't have a regular residence due to his extremely hectic schedule as a host, so his fridges are bare. Therefore, all guests throughout the season and regular chefs had sent him gifts to fill up his hotel fridge.)	15 June 2017	Yao Chen, Wang Luodan	(France) Anaud

=== Season 4 ===
List of episodes in Season 4 (31-40)

Episode #	Broadcast Date	Guest(s)	Guest Chefs	Teams (Head Chef in italics)
31	25 April 2018	House-Husbands special Jason Zhang, (Note: Singer from Sichuan, husband of Xie Na. As Xie Na was still lactating at the time, all spicy foods were removed from the fridge.)Vinny Huang (Note: Actor and reality star from Nanjing, resides in Beijing. Starred in Where Are We Going, Dad with his daughter.)	Li Yang, (Note: Born after 1990, Gemini from Beijing, he won World Pasta Championship in Romania in 2017 in sea food category, China's youngest world champion in the event. He was also expecting to become a father (born before season 5). His leadership and work style is similar to Jeffery.) Laura Luo (Note: 25, Food research and developer from Fuzhou. Already has a 4-year-old.)	Jackson, Jefferey, Tian Shu, Li Yang Vinny Huang, Vinny, An Xianmin, Laura Luo
32	2 May 2018	House-Husbands special Jason Zhang,Vinny Huang	Li Yang, Laura Luo	Jackson, Jefferey, Tian Shu, Li Yang Jason Zhang, Vinny, An Xianmin, Laura Luo
33	9 May 2018	A Better Tomorrow 2018 special Ma Tianyu, (Note: Pescestarian, has been living alone since 18, typical homeboy, and extremely introverted. Has low tolerance to alcohol and spicy foods.) (Taiwan) Darren Wang (Note: Prefers staying with flatmates, which is completely different from Ma Tianyu)	Laura Luo (Note: Remained as guest chef with 5 regular chefs as she was the winning member of the team competitions in the last round. She was picked as Head Chef in episode 3, but her lack of familiarity of the kitchen, and lack of experience as a head chef, showed.)	Jackson, Jeffrey, Vinny, Yao Weitao Darren Wang, An Xianmin, Hu Shasha, Laura Luo
34	16 May 2018	A Better Tomorrow 2018 special Ma Tianyu, (Taiwan) Darren Wang	Laura Luo	Jackson, An Xianmin, Hu Shasha, Laura Luo Ma Tianyu, Jeffrey, Vinny, Yao Weitao
35	23 May 2018	Online Pals special (part 2: Zhang Xinyi's wedding anniversary) Li Dan, (Note: Errenzhuan actor, author from inner Mongolia, renting in Beijing. Nicknamed 'Mr. Egg' due to the homonym of his name.) Zhang Xinyi (Note: Actress from Sichuan, married Justin Yuan in 2016. Has alcohol allergies.)	Li Yang, (Note: Returning from Round 1, first guest chef to win twice as Head Chef in episode 5.)Laura, (Note: Won 4 of the 5 contests, with 3 in a row, once as a Head Chef, promoted to regular chef, replacing Liu Kaile. It is revealed on the 30 May episode, on Zhang Xinyi's wedding anniversary, that she is a single parent.) Giovanni Young (Note: Chinese. Born in September 1994, making Jackson the second-youngest member for the first time ever. Executive Chef of an Italian restaurant, with vast experience working in Michelin-starred restaurant.)	Jackson, Giovanni Young, (Note: Named as Head Chef, but each chef will make their own dishes, with Giovanni as the Co-ordinator. The strategy is formed as Jackson has not won in 4 consecutive battles as Team Leader. Jackson lost for the 5th time in a row.) An Xianmin, Tian Shu Zhang Xinyi, Li Yang, Jefferey, Laura
36	30 May 2018	Online Pals special (part 2: Zhang Xinyi's wedding anniversary) Li Dan, Zhang Xinyi	Li Yang,Laura, Giovanni Young	Jackson, (Note: Was forced to swim naked if he suffers 6 consecutive losses, but the losing streak was snapped.) Giovanni Young, An Xianmin, Tian Shu Li Dan, Li Yang, Jefferey, Laura
37	6 June 2018	Northeasterners special Wei Daxun, (Note: Actor. First ever returnee to the show. Was Jackson's substitute host when Jackson was a guest in season 1. Loves cold drinks even in winter, also prefers savoury and bitter drinks because he once weighted over 100 kg before high school. He gave Jackson his second consecutive win because Jeffrey's menu is more nutritious.) Song Xiaobao (Note: Two-people rotation actor from Jilin Province.)	Li Yang (Note: Laura Luo officially becomes a regular Chef.)	Jackson, Jeffrey, An Xianmin, Laura Song Xiaobao, Li Dan, Vinny, Hu Shasha
38	13 June 2018	Northeasterners special Wei Daxun, Song Xiaobao	Li Yang	Jackson, Jeffrey, An Xianmin, Laura Wei Daxun, Li Dan, Vinny, Hu Shasha
39	20 June 2018	Stephy Qi, (Note: Singer-actress from Sichuan. Married American-Korean Nathan Lee Seung-hyun, and has a daughter. Have very high tolerance to sweetness, sourness and spiciness.) Cheney Chen (Note: Singer-Actor from Wenzhou. Stars in the Chinese version of Let Go of My Babies with Jackson Wang, and also competing in King of Cross-Field Singers, a singing competition for singers who originally debuted as other non-musical professions in the entertainment industry. Loves seafood and bodybuilding protein shakes, has no tolerance to spicy foods.)	None (Note: Li Yang earned the promotion after winning 2 Head Chef badges, tied with Vinny Huang, later, An Xianmin also joined them.)	Jackson, Tian Shu, (Note: Tian Shu is finally picked by Jackson to be Head Chef for the first time, and won his first badge.) Jefferey, Li Yang Cheney Chen, Vinny, An Xianmin, Laura (Note: Chef's lineup is the same as Round 1.)
40	27 June 2018	Stephy Qi, Cheney Chen	None	Jackson, Tian Shu, Jefferey, Li Yang Stephy Qi, Vinny, An Xianmin, Laura (Note: With her second win as Head Chef, she tied with An Xianmin, Li Yang and Vinny as Best Head Chef in Season 4 with 2 wins each. Jackson finished with under 50% win rate.)
Special	27 June 2018	Let Go of My Babies special (Note: A show similar to The Return of Superman. Jackson Wang & Cheney Chen are regular cast members in season 3.) (Note: Before the start of episode 10, the Head Chef's badges chart between the 6 chefs in Round 5 are: Vinny, An Xianmin, Li Yang (2 each) Jefferey, Tian Shu, Laura (1 each)) Jackson Zhou, (Note: 4, American-Chinese biracial.)Henry Dan (Note: 3, from Shanghai)	None	Jackson, Tian Shu, Jefferey, Li Yang Stephy Qi, Vinny, An Xianmin, Laura
Special	27 June 2018	Special He Jiong, Jackson	None	None (Note: At the end of the final episode, all 6 chefs made a meal for He Jiong and Jackson using the remaining items from Stephy and Cheney's fridges.)

=== Season 5 ===
List of episodes in Season 5 (41-50)

Episode #	Broadcast Date	Guest(s)	Teams (Head Chef in italics)
41	10 April 2019	Li Yuchun, (Note: Singer-songwriter. Gained famed for her unisex look and a low-range mezzo-soprano, a rarity amongst Chinese singers.) Gabrielle Guan (Note: Actress, from Beijing of Manchu descent. Known for her long legs and the girlfriend of Lu Han. Owner of the largest ever fridge in the program thus far. Due to the fridge unit being in-built kitchenware set causing logistical issues, a 90% replica of the fridge is shown, including a wine fridge unit. She was unable to follow the footsteps of her grandfather's footsteps to learn Beijing Qinshu due to her not having a high soprano range and a bright head voice.)	Gabrielle Guan, Jefferey Jackson, Liu Kaile
42	17 April 2019	Li Yuchun, Gabrielle Guan	Li Yuchun, Laura Luo Jackson, An Xianmin
43	24 April 2019	Chi Zi, (Note: Born in 1995 from Henan, but raised in Beijing, a talk show comedian and social commentator, known for his marked comments, formerly a food blogger. A teetotal, but loves Sprite. Like Gabrielle Guan: Dislikes blue cheese. He was involved in a controversy where he filled the fridge with fresh foods on the morning of the recording, which violates his own philosophy of being a regular takeaway user. Therefore becoming the first person to ever had new items isolated, but can still be used in cooking.) Orfila Wu (Note: Actress from Liaoning, lives in Changsha. Owner of 3 fridges, but only one for food (despite mostly for Chinese medicines and supplements). He Jiong knows of her smallest cosmetics fridge in Happy Camp. Despite her ability to make mulled wine, she has very low tolerance to alcohol. A homebody and an introvert, she has been entering shows that really didn't suit her style, but they were all her efforts to lose weight.) Guest Chef: Yang Bei Cun	Jackson, Laura Luo Orfila Wu, Yang Bei Cun
44	1 May 2019	Chi Zi, Orfila Wu Guest Chef: Yang Bei Cun	Jackson, Wang Yan Chi Zi, Li Yang
45	8 May 2019	Lifetime Bachelor and Bachelorette Special Peng Yuchang, (Note: Actor, same age as Jackson, but younger by 7 months. Known for his massive appetite, rapid yet healthy weight loss and premature hair loss. His fridge is the only one that featured all drinks (soft drinks and beer), so all edible resources are only extremely spicy noodles and sausages from his backpack. The rules are temporarily changed so that they can head out to buy ingredients for 30 minutes, but 'instant noddles' must be utilized. The head chef is determined by the ingredients bought.) Shen Yue (Note: Actress from Hunan, best known for her roles in A Love So Beautiful and Meteor Garden. Often collects tools and gadgets, as she has a very structured lifestyle and low-fat diet.) Guest Chef: Yang Bei Cun	Jackson, Li Yang Shen Yue, Laura
46	15 May 2019	Lifetime Bachelor and Bachelorette Special Peng Yuchang, Shen Yue Guest Chef: Yang Bei Cun	Jackson, Vinny Huang Peng Yuchang, An Xianmin
47	22 May 2019	University Student-teacher Reunion Special Zhou Dongyu, Papi Jiang (Jiang Yilei) (Note: Actress, director, vlogger, Chinese Internet Personality of 2016. Has a Masters Degree in Filmmaking. Was Zhou Dongyu's supervisor her final Bachelor's thesis.)	Jackson, Laura Papi Jiang, Vinny
48	29 May 2019	University Student-teacher Reunion Special Zhou Dongyu, Papi Jiang (Jiang Yilei)	Jackson, Vinny Huang Zhou Dongyu, Liu Kaile (Note: Liu Kaile earned his first win in team competition format, and ended the longest drought (1057 days, or 151 weeks).)
49	5 June 2019	Andy Yang Zi, (Note: Actress, Jackson's idol. Hates spicy food. Her family is known for storing food for emergency, especially plain Chinese buns.) Mao Buyi (Note: Singer-songwriter, a former nurse. As Yang Ziyi and he are both renters, they each have a fridge of the exact same model, yet most items in his fridge belong to his flatmates, two of which were with him when they competed in The Coming One. He decided to stay in a dorm because during he lived alone during his trainings as a nurse, and has developed a fear of being alone.)	Jackson & He Jiong, (Note: Since Jackson is a fan of Yang Zi, there was a deal made to let He Jiong to take over for 7.5 minutes, so they could have a mini fan meeting.) Liu Kaile Mao Buyi, An Xianmin
50	12 June 2019	Andy Yang Zi, Mao Buyi	Jackson, An Xianmin Mao Buyi, Jefferey
Special	12 June 2019	Andy Yang Zi, Mao Buyi	Jackson, An Xianmin Mao Buyi, Jefferey
Special	12 June 2019		None (Note: Jackson and He Jiong each write names to predict the pair of guests for the first episode of season 6 as a bet. If they are unsuccessful, they must wear a costume of the partner's choosing.)

=== Season 6 ===
List of episodes in Season 6 (51-60)

Episode #	Broadcast Date	Guest(s)	Teams
51	28 April 2020	Joy of Life Special Zhang Ruoyun (Note: Actor from Beijing, Known to be a highly relaxed homebody/elite gamer outside of work. A decent cook himself. Wife was pregnant with a child at the time. As such, he separated his personal fridge and one for his family.) Kevin Guo (Note: Born in 1996, Xiangsheng actor, founding members of Deyunshe, a crosstalk and comedy group. An introverted renter as he hasn't lived in Beijing for over 5 years (since 2017, where most of his foods were gifted, so many items in the fridge were well-overdue). Lives minimalistically except for gaming, yet easily guilt-tripped by retailers into buying anything. Loves rice and fried foods.)	Kevin Guo, An Xianmin Wei Daxun, Ming Liang
52	5 May 2020	Joy of Life Special Zhang Ruoyun Kevin Guo	Zhang Ruoyun, Yang Bei Cun Wei Daxun, Dong Yanlei Special feature: Rice Lunch box by An Xianmin
53	12 May 2020	Guo Jingming, (Note: Author, Screenwriter, Director, Actor and Lyricst. Has OCD, perfectionistic, heliophobic and workaholic tendencies. Had shipped home decor to movie sets to cut costs. A glassware and stemware collector. Fruit-lover, dislikes fried foods.) Zheng Shuang (Note: Actress from Shenyang. Was lead actress in some film adaptations of Guo Jingming's books. Loves watching, but dislikes being in idol dramas due to its over-idealistic view of the world. An indecisive buyer.)	Zheng Shuang, Yang Bei Cun Wei Daxun, Laura Luo
54	19 May 2020	Guo Jingming, Zheng Shuang	Special feature: Zheng Shuang's Idealistic Fridge Watermelon BBQ by Dong Yanlei Guo Jingming, Ming Liang Wei Daxun, Liu Kaile
55	26 May 2020	Fanmeeting special (Taiwan) Ouyang Nana, (Note: Taiwanese celloist, pianist, singer-composer, actress, amateur fashion merchandiser and vlogger currently based in China. A middle child and child star, studied in The Curtis Institute of Music in Philadelphia, left at 16 and never learnt to sing until she studied in Berklee College of Music in Boston from 18 (still studying online). Likes vegetable and fruits, dislikes refined sugars and exercise.) (Taiwan) Joe Chen (Note: Taiwanese singer, actress, TV Host based in Beijing. Started as a model-actress trainee, with strict monthly evaluations akin to Korean trainee systems. Loves different kinds of sweet and spicy sauces, strong, pungent preserved pastes and innards.) Special Guest via satellite: Yang Di	Joe Chen, An Xianmin Wei Daxun, Vinny Huang
56	2 June 2020	Fanmeeting special (Taiwan) Ouyang Nana, (Taiwan) Joe Chen Special Guest via satellite: Yang Di	Ouyang Nana, Arnold Lin Wei Daxun, Dong Yanlei
Special	2 June 2020	Wei Daxun's Parting Gifts	None (Note: Jackson returns from episode 7, as such ends Wei Daxun's stint as host. Each chef's parting gift is a postcard with each chef's offer to cook him a meal, a lifetime free dining pass from He Jiong, and the main plaque from the cooking area of the filming set, along with his own apron.)
57	9 June 2020	Season 5 Predictor Special (Note: At the end of Season 5, both He Jiong and Jackson both predicted their first guests on postcards sealed in a wax-sealed envelopes. The reveal was delayed. Both correctly picked Bai Jingting and Jing Boran, but on a tie-breaker to predict the other person's predictions, only Jackson correctly predicted He Jiong would pick Bai Jingting.) Bai Jingting, (Note: Actor, former pianist and hip-hop songwriter from Huairou District of Beijing of Manchurian descent. He is also the celebrity spokesperson for Mei Yi Tian Milk range, the new naming sponsor for the show on season 6. Loves hotpot with different types of sauces, but also loves to eat healthily.) Jing Boran (Note: Actor/Singer from Liaoning, known to be very fashionable and has a dedicated non-alcoholic drinks fridge with fancy packaging. Dislikes light to the point that his house is full of dark lightings. His house has the same interior design as He Jiong's and designed by the same designer that made Bai Jingting's house, but with very different styles. Unlike Guo Jingting, his glassware collection is mostly for coffee mugs and teacups.)	Jing Boran, An Xianmin Jackson Wang, Arnold Lin
58	June 16, 2020	Season 5 Predictor Special Bai Jingting, Jing Boran	Bai Jingting, Liu Kaile Jackson Wang, An Xianmin
59	23 June 2020	Northerner Special 2 Johnny Huang, Yang Chaoyue (Note: Singer/Actress from Jiangsu. As of 23 June 2020, a former member of Rocket Girls 101, and is the only remaining member of CH2, making her a solo artist after disbandment. She enjoys being a host because the cue cards would give her spoilers and instructions ahead of time.)	Special feature:Johnny Huang's Idealistic Fridge Yang Chaoyue, Ming Liang Jackson Wang, Laura Luo
60	30 June 2020	Northerner Special 2 Johnny Huang, Yang Chaoyue	Johnny Huang, Dong Yanlei Jackson Wang, Vinny Huang
Special	30 June 2020		None

=== Season 7 ===
List of episodes in Season 7 (61-70)

Episode #	Broadcast Date	Guest(s)	Teams	Guest Chef(s)
61	22 June 2021	Wu Lei, Zhao Liying	Team Winner He Jiong, Jackson Wang, Nine, Chen Ziming Team Happy Wu Lei, Zhao Liying, AK	Huang Yan, Liang Yanwei
62	29 June 2021	Wu Lei, Zhao Liying	Team Boss Zhao Liying, He Jiong, Jackson Wang, Chen Ziming Generation Z Team Wu Lei, Nine, AK	Huang Yan, Liang Yanwei
63	6 July 2021	Li Xueqin, Vin Zhang, Zhou Jiuliang	He Jiong, Zhou Jiuliang, Nine Jackson Wang, Vin Zhang, AK	Tian Shu
64	13 July 2021	Gong Jun, Yu Shuxin	He Jiong, Gong Jun, Nine Jackson Wang, Yu Shuxin, AK	Liu Kaile
65	20 July 2021	Yu Shuxin, Yang Tianzhen	Jackson Wang, Yu Shuxin He Jiong, Yang Tianzhen	Huang Yan, Liu Kaile
66	27 July 2021	Wang Sulong, Zhao Lusi	Wang Sulong, Zhao Lusi Nine, AK Jackson Wang, He Jiong	Tian Shu
67	3 August 2021	Yue Yunpeng, Ma Di, Mao Buyi, Xu Weizhou	Team Yueyue Yue Yunpeng, Ma Di, Nine, Chen Ziming Team Maomao Mao Buyi, Xu Weizhou, He Jiong, AK	None
68	10 August 2021	Papi Jiang, Li Xueqin	Jackson Wang, Papi Jiang, Nine He Jiong, Li Xueqin, AK	Laura Luo La
69	17 August 2021	Yue Yunpeng, Wei Daxun	Team Yueyue Yue Yunpeng, He Jiong, AK Team Daxun Wei Daxun, Dong Yanlei, Nine	Dong Yanlei
70	24 August 2021	Wowkie Zhang, Li Weijia,	Jackson Wang, Wowkie Zhang He Jiong, Li Weijia Nine, AK,	Huang Yan, Jeffrey Chen Ruijie
