= Social butterfly =

A social butterfly is a slang term for a person who is socially dynamic, successful at networking, charismatic, and personally gregarious. Usually, social butterflies don’t belong to a particular group, but rather jump from one group to another. They are accepted in all of these groups, but don’t necessarily have any deep friendship connections in any of them. It may also refer to:

- Social Butterfly, a character in the comic book series Livewires
- "Social Butterfly", a song recorded by Finnish singer Kim Herold
