= Magic Man (Jackson Wang album) =

- Digital cover

Studio album by Jackson Wang
- Released: September 9, 2022
- Genres: Rock; soul; grunge
- Length: 27:23
- Language: English
- Labels: Team Wang; 88rising; Warner
- Producers: Cambo; Loualldady; Leelee; Floyd Fuji; Roland Gajate Garcia; Falconry; Powers Pleasant; Trackside; Jon Bellion; Pete Nappi; Cut & Dry; Jeremy Schmett; My Boy Steve; Rootkit; Tito

Jackson Wang chronology
Lost & Found (2022)	Magic Man (2022)	Magic Man 2 (2025)

Singles from Magic Man
- 1. "Blow" Released: March 31, 2022; 2. "Cruel" Released: July 29, 2022

Magic Man is the second studio album by Hong Kong rapper Jackson Wang. It was released on September 9, 2022, through Team Wang Records, 88rising and Warner Records. Debuting at number 5 in South Korea and number 15 in the United States, the album received positive reviews from critics, who complimented Wang's vocal experimentation and new sound.

== Background ==
I think [Magic Man] is the ultimate form. Because I went through all this stuff around me, in every way possible... I've been through so much that people know about and some people don't know about. It's like fighting through but it's the different stages of fighting through and ultimately, I became this adjective of a feeling, this abstract image of 'Magic Man.' [...] I think a Magic Man to everybody is the ultimate form of yourself, of fighting through everything. Your loneliness, your sadness, your obstacles. You've just got to fight through that and be you. And then you're the Magic Man. [...] The message is that everyone goes through stuff, everyone has their own problems. Sometimes it's okay to say you're not okay. And you can solve it, you can conquer it, you can be the Magic Man, you will be that ultimate form of yourself.

— Jackson Wang, Rolling Stone India, September 2022

Preparations for Wang's second full-length studio album began in spring 2020 with the aim of publishing it by the end of the year. Between 2020 and 2021, the singer experienced a mental breakdown, during which he began to feel lost, didn't know who he was and what he was doing, and thought he was not good enough or not working hard enough. After a year and a half, he started overcoming it by confiding his problems to friends for the first time, and the feeling of rebirth led him to decide to leave behind his former self, as a person and artist, and start over, wanting to show the public a more honest side of himself, whether good or bad. The release of the album was moved to August 2021, then in the autumn of the same year, and further postponed after deciding to delete and re-do eight songs. It was finally announced on July 29 for September 9, 2022, along with the tracklist.

Wang's burnout is the inspiration for most of the album, which is about embarking on a journey of exploration and research of the new self, introducing Jackson Wang's present persona. The title was announced in the final credits of the music video for "Drive You Home", a single released on July 29, 2021, accompanied by the subtitle "The longer the night lasts, the more our dreams will be." On April 26, 2022, the last song on the album was replaced and created; the singer decided the entire direction of the record, as well as writing the lyrics and composing every track. The recording sessions for each song lasted an hour and a half, during which Wang followed his instinct, without aiming for perfection and caring too much about the technical part; instead, he concentrated on delivering the lyrics.

== Composition ==
In the making of Magic Man, Wang was inspired, among others, by Inception and by not wanting to give a definite interpretation of art, leaving everyone the opportunity to make their own theories, and by the rawness of Prince, whose red corvette from "Little Red Corvette" appears in the lyrics of "Drive it You Like You Stole it"; the performances are instead inspired by modern art and contemporary dance.

Magic Man explores three different people in the process of analyzing and accepting his own emotions: the first is identified by the element of fire and the color red, a symbol of temptation and madness; the second is identified by water and the blue color, and represents a world of ice in which you found calmness; the third and final person is identified by the color grey, and represents void, solitude and silence. In an interview with Rolling Stone India, Wang compared the record to the journey that took him from almost going crazy to use that energy to become the ultimate version of himself.

The first person was presented on March 31, 2022, with the release of "Blow", the opening song of the album. The track is reminiscent of 90s rock and balances analog and digital sounds, as well as combining hard percussion sounds and distorted guitar riffs in the chorus, creating a drunken-trance-like atmosphere. The sonic intensity is matched with a raspy-almost-gruff vocalization. "Blow" speaks of a forbidden love, "fleeting-yet-heated", in which the singer is drawn in by a stranger woman's magnetism, regardless of the danger. The music video, directed by Daniel Cloud Campos and released on the same day, has a steampunk vibe, with corsets and puff sleeves, which was compared to Dorian Gray and Bridgerton: Wang and a group of party-goers, passed out on the floor, inhale an unknown smoke-like substance and, when they regain consciousness, start dancing in a state of trance.

Magic Man's second track, "Cruel", was performed for the first time at Coachella on April 16, 2022 and published as a single the following July 29. At the press conference, Wang said that the song's grunge and raw sound was "the perfect representation of the distorted and warped story that I am trying to unfold. It is the opus to a wild yet beautiful symphony," and stated that it had set the direction of the record in terms of narrative and sound. The track is about an electrifying relationship, reinforcing the addiction sung in "Blow".

Moving from drums to guitar, with a jive-like pre-refrain, "Champagne Cool" talks about the reality of the entertainment world, using champagne as a metaphor for a murky reality, while "Go Ghost" tells about abandoning a toxic relationship. In "Drive it Like You Stole it" he sings of celebrity glamor and the heady rush of stardom with smooth R&B disco beats; "Come Alive" is a mix of jazz and rock in which Wang adores and begs for his partner. "Just Like Magic" mixes rock and reggae hip hop influences; it is followed by "All The Way", a call for help, and "Dopamine", which delves into the need for happiness and fulfillment. The album is closed by "Blue", a song in which Wang sings of feeling confident despite the sadness, accompanied by guitar chords and the clear arrangement of percussions.

In a 2025 interview with L'Officiel Hong Kong, Wang said he wasn't entirely satisfied with Magic Man because the songs didn't match the concept of the album, finding your own happiness.

== Promotion ==
On November 25, 2022, Wang kicked off the Magic Man World Tour in Bangkok, Thailand, travelling through Malaysia, Singapore, London and Paris. Additional stops in North America, Mexico and South America were announced at the end of January 2023.

== Critical reception ==
Professional ratings
Review scores
Source	Rating
Clash	8/10
NME	4/5 stars

Jennifer Zhan of Vulture commented that the whole record was permeated with emotional turmoil and complimented Wang's experimentations with his voice, ranging from low tones to falsetto. Franchesca Judine Basbas of Bandwagon described the new sound as "more grand, dramatic, and impassioned" compared to the expected loud and bold hip hop of Wang's early releases, observing that Magic Man was the pinnacle of the synthwave alt-rock style of music he had been building up since 2021 and concluding that the singer knew exactly how to use his voice.

Consequence of Sound defined the record as "wonderfully dramatic and indulgent." For Nandini Iyengar of Bollywood Hungama, listening to Magic Man felt like receiving a comforting hug thanks to Wang's more nuanced and mature sound after his journey of self-discovery, concluding that he managed to both showcase his talent, share an empowering message and carve himself a road for further experimenting. Riddhi Chakraborty of Rolling Stone India compared Wang to a chameleon, both for the diverse sound – which reminded her of Arctic Monkeys, Arcade Fire and Queens of the Stone Age – and the vocal techniques used.

For Tanu I. Raj of NME, the singer managed to showcase his growth by meshing old and new influences in his sound, stating that the best moments came when Wang combined his cool attitude with a playfulness akin to the "magic man" of the album's title. She chose "Champagne Cool" as the best song, but deemed the conclusion to be a bit weak, especially in "All The Way" and "Blue".

Magic Man was featured in IZM's September 2022 Editor's Choice column, for which Son Gi-ho wrote: "The timber of a global artist blossomed amidst endless anxieties and worries," recommending "Drive it Like You Stole it", "Come Alive" and "Blue".

The music video for "Blow" was included among Bandwagon's best music videos of the first half of 2022 list. It was featured in Pop Crush's list of the 15 best pop albums of 2022 and in The Associated Press's best 10. In a similar list compiled by Bandwagon it was described as "grand, dramatic and alluring."

== Commercial performance ==
Magic Man debuted at No. 15 on the Billboard 200 in the United States of America, also ranking third on the Top Album Sales and on the Top Current Album Sales Charts.

In South Korea, where it was released on October 6, 2022, it debuted at No. 5 on the Circle Weekly Album Chart with 62,000 copies sold. By the end of the month, it sold 83,871 copies. According to the Hanteo Chart, it sold 161,244 copies in South Korea in October.

== Track listing ==
Magic Man track listing
No.	Title	Writer(s)	Producer(s)	Length
1.	"Blow"	Cameron Bartolini; Jack Samson; Jackson Wang; Liam Kevany; Louis Bartolini; Patrick Michael Smith	Cambo; Loualldady; Leelee	2:43
2.	"Cruel"	C. Bartolini; Samson; Kyle A. Thornton; L. Bartolini; Roland Gajate Garcia	Cambo; Floyd Fuji; Loualldady; Garcia	3:15
3.	"Champagne Cool"	C. Bartolini; Samson; Wang; L. Bartolini; Smith	Cambo; Loualldady	2:42
4.	"Go Ghost"	Dru Decaro; Wang; L. Bartolini; Powers Pleasant; William Schultz	Falconry; Loualldady; Powers Pleasant	2:20
5.	"Drive It Like You Stole It"	Diederik Van Elsas; Wang; Montana Wayne Best; Parrish Warrington; Rook Monroe	Trackside	3:00
6.	"Come Alive"	C. Bartolini; Chris Miles; Samson; Wang; Leelee; L. Bartolini	Cambo; Leelee; Loualldady	2:52
7.	"Just Like Magic"	C. Bartolini; L. Bartolini; Molly Lewis; Myles Bell; Ryan Alexander Short	Cambo; Loualldady	2:31
8.	"All the Way"	Elijah Noll; Jon Bellion; Martin Coogan; Pete Nappi	Bellion; Nappi	2:05
9.	"Dopamine"	Adam Korbesmeyer; Jerry "JL" Lang II; Michael Matosic; Olivia Waithe	Cut & Dry	3:11
10.	"Blue"	Benjamin Shubert; Chase Copley; Jeremy Michael Schmetterer; Kashif Hassan Khan; Steven Haddad; Tristan "Tito" Seccuro	Jeremy Schmett; My Boy Steve; Rootkit; Tito	2:39
Total length:				27:23

== Charts ==
=== Weekly charts ===
Weekly chart performance for Magic Man
Chart (2022)	Peak position
Japan Digital Albums (Billboard Japan)	100
South Korean Albums (Circle)	5
UK Digital Albums (OCC)	40
US Billboard 200	15

=== Monthly charts ===
Monthly chart performance for Magic Man
Chart (2022)	Peak position
South Korean Albums (Circle)	15

== Accolades ==
Name of the award ceremony, year presented, award category, nominee(s) of the award, and result of nomination
Award ceremony	Year	Category	Nominee(s)/work(s)	Result	Ref.
American Advertising Awards	2023	Gold Winners – Best Virtual Production	"Come Alive" music video	Won	
American Advertising Awards	2023	Gold Winners – Best Virtual Production	"Cruel" music video	Won	
American Advertising Awards	2023	Gold Winners – Best CGI	"Come Alive" music video	Won	
American Advertising Awards	2023	Gold Winners – Best CGI	"Cruel" music video	Won	
American Advertising Awards	2023	Best of Winners – Best Virtual Production	"Cruel" music video	Won	
Asian Pop Music Awards	2022	Best Album of the Year (Chinese)	Magic Man	Nominated	
Asian Pop Music Awards	2022	Record of the Year (Chinese)	"Blow"	Nominated	
Asian Pop Music Awards	2022	Best Music Video (Chinese)	"Cruel"	Nominated	
Asian Pop Music Awards	2022	Top 20 Best Albums of the Year (Chinese)	Magic Man	Won	
Wave Music Awards	2023	Record of the Year	"Blow"	Nominated	
Wave Music Awards	2023	Best Pop Album	Magic Man	Won	
Wave Music Awards	2023	Best Album Production	Magic Man	Nominated	
Wave Music Awards	2023	Best Song Arrangement	"Blue"	Nominated	
Wave Music Awards	2023	Best Music Video	"Blow"	Nominated	
