= J.Sheon =

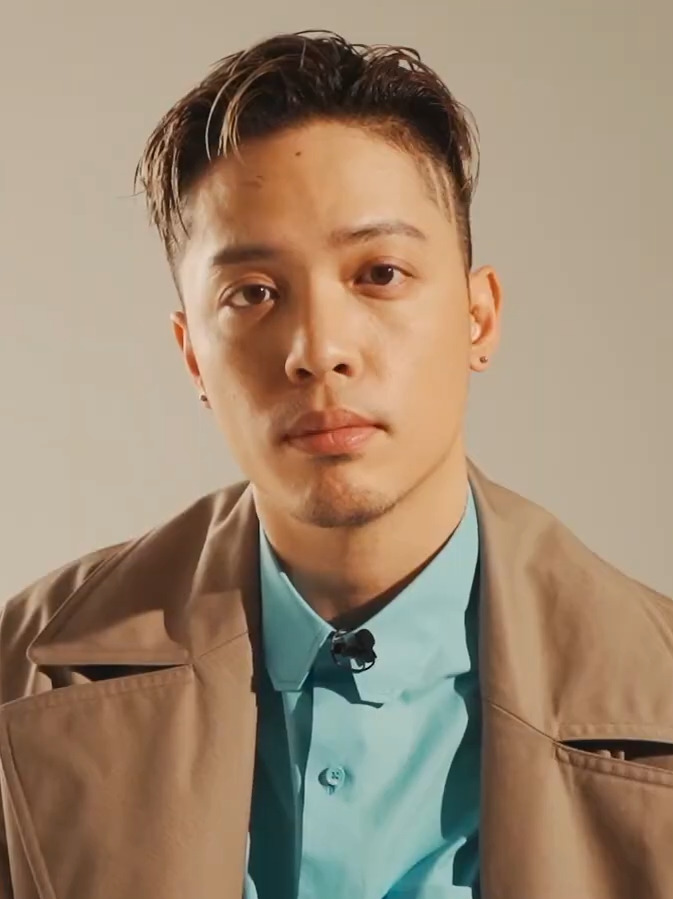
- J.Sheon in 2020

Background information
- Born: Chuang Hsun; 24 December 1985 (age 40); Taiwan
- Genres: R&B hip hop
- Occupations: Rapper, singer and producer
- Labels: Sony Music Taiwan; Team Wang

Chinese name
- Traditional Chinese: 莊珣
Transcriptions
Standard Mandarin
- Hanyu Pinyin: Zhuāng Xún
- Bopomofo: ㄓㄨㄤ ㄒㄩㄣˊ

J.Sheon (born 24 December 1985) is a Taiwanese rapper, singer and producer. J.Sheon debuted with his self-titled album J.Sheon街巷 in May 2017. In 2018, he won the Billboard Radio China Top New Artist Awards 2017.

== Career ==
J.Sheon, an alumnus of Queensborough Community College, moved to New York at the age of 19 and spent eight years there. According to him, he started to produce music because he was bored.

In 2012 or 2013, he suddenly decided to take his music career more seriously and moved back to Taiwan. He did a cover for See You Again in Mandarin on YouTube which became popular.

He signed up with Sony Music Taiwan and in 2017 debuted with his self-titled album J.Sheon街巷.

In 2018, he won the Billboard Radio China Top New Artist Awards 2017.

== Discography ==
=== Album ===
- J.Sheon街巷 (2017)
- The Alley巷子內 (2019)
- OUTCOMES 結果論 (2024)

=== Singles ===
- You'll Never Know / 別問很可怕 (2017)
- 壞蛋特調 (2017)
- friDay 超展開 (2018)
- THAT FIRE (2019)
- 輸情歌 (2019)
- 愛已死 (2020)
- SHERRY BOMB at 12 AM (2020)
- 不良示範 (2022)
- 同個世界 - bilibili & Disney《正義的算法》片尾曲 (2022)
- 某某 (with ICE杨长青) [2023]
- 萬餓城市 (feat. 同理 Zunya) - 影集《美食無間》片頭曲 (2023)
- 慣老闆 (feat. 瘦子E.SO) [2024]
- 生不帶來死不帶走 (feat. 剃刀蔣 RAZOR) [2024]
