= Papi Jiang =

Chinese comedian

- Papi酱
- Born: Jiang Yilei (姜逸磊); February 17, 1987 (age 39); Shanghai, China
- Other name: Papi Jiang
- Education: Central Academy of Drama
- Occupations: Actress, Comedian, CEO/Founder of Vlog Production company
- Spouse: Xu Bin (m. 2014)
- Children: 1 son

Bilibili information
- Channel: papi酱
- Years active: 2015–present
- Genre: Comedy
- Followers: 8,595,668

Chinese name
- Chinese: Papi酱
- Literal meaning: Papi-chan
Transcriptions
Standard Mandarin
- Hanyu Pinyin: Papi Jiāng

Real name
- Chinese: 姜逸磊
Transcriptions
Standard Mandarin
- Hanyu Pinyin: Jiāng Yìlěi
- Last updated: 2 March 2026

Jiang Yilei (Chinese: 姜逸磊; pinyin: Jiāng Yìlěi; born February 17, 1987), better known by her online name Papi Jiang (Chinese: Papi酱; pinyin: Papi Jiàng) is a Chinese influencer and actor. She rose to prominence for her comedic videos on everyday life and popular culture.

== Early life ==
Jiang attended the Central Academy of Drama, where she majored in directing and received bachelor's and master's degrees. She worked in the entertainment industry for several years as a stage actress and assistant director.

In 2015, Jiang was introduced to online content creation by her college friend Yang Ming, who would become founder of Mountain Top agency and her business partner. She began posting videos with another friend, Huo Nifang, under the name TCGirls Love Complaining (Chinese: TCgirls爱吐槽; pinyin: TCgirls ài tǔcáo), before posting solo videos under the name "Papi Jiang", with "Jiang" a pun on her last name and the Japanese honorific -chan.

== Career ==
In November 2015, Jiang found her first viral video in making fun of Shanghai people who mix Shanghai dialect and English words. Her videos received more than 290 million hits on major media platforms in just four months, and accumulated over 44 million followers in a year.

On April 1, 2016, Jiang landed RMB 12 million (USD 1.8 million) from four investors including Zhen Fund (Chinese: 真格基金; pinyin: Zhēn gé jījīn) and Luo Zhenyu, host of Logic Talk Show (Chinese: 罗辑思维; pinyin: Luōjí sīwéi). The investment gave the investors a 12% stake and valued Jiang at RMB 100 million. In 2016, she founded PapiTube, a group that supports young content creators in China. By the end of the 2016, Luo withdrew from investment of Jiang.

On June 21, 2018, she became chief content officer of the Baidu app.

In 2024, she voiced Disgust in the Mandarin Chinese dub of Inside Out 2.

== Influence ==
Common subjects of Jiang's videos include everyday life and popular culture. In July 2016, her first livestream, which lasted 90 minutes, received 74 million views in one day. She was profiled by The New York Times the following month.

In April 2016, China's broadcasting regulator, State Administration of Press, Publication, Radio, Film, and Television, ordered Jiang to remove vulgar language from her videos. Most of her videos were temporarily taken down, a move that was interpreted as part of the government's efforts to tighten control over online content.
