= Mirrors (Jackson Wang album) =

Studio album by Jackson Wang
- Released: October 25, 2019
- Recorded: 2019
- Genre: Hip hop; R&B
- Length: 21:37
- Language: English; Chinese
- Label: Team Wang; Western and 6th

Jackson Wang chronology
Mirrors (2019)	Lost & Found (2022)

Singles from Mirrors
- 1. "Bullet to the Heart" Released: September 24, 2019; 2. "Dway!" Released: October 22, 2019

Mirrors is the debut full-length studio album by Hong Kong recording artist Jackson Wang. It was released by his own label, Team Wang and Western and 6th, on October 25, 2019. "Bullet to the Heart" and "Dway!" served as the album's lead singles.

In conjunction with the release of Mirrors, the singer and artist Da Yan created an interactive video installation space titled Bullet to the Heart: 0328 at the Love Love Love Art of Love Exhibition at Shum Yip Upperhills Tower 1 in Shenzhen from 24 October to 3 November.

== Background ==
The album was initially titled Journey to the West, referring a traditional Chinese story, and symbolized Wang's journey to the west of the world, that is America. It was supposed to be of pop genre.

On September 12, 2019, Wang held a listening session of his first album Mirrors for the press: the digital record, which expresses the emotions of the contemporary youth and incorporates elements of China's traditional culture, was produced in China, South Korea, and the United States. Wang supervised the whole process, from the initial creation to the packaging, and was personally involved in arrangements, lyrics writing, and music video shooting. The album features the Chinese version of Stephanie Poetri's "I Love You 3000" and seven tracks in English, among which "Faded" was supposed to be released as a standalone single in March 2019.

In an interview with i-D, Wang stated "For this album I actually found my true identity. I've released a lot of rap songs in the past; In China I release many ballads and R&B songs, so it just came to a conclusion where I felt like the fusion of it all was me." Through Mirrors, he shares his truest and deepest feelings, talking about love, running out of time, his achievements and where he is in life. Although the songs' main theme looks like romantic love, the counterpart he sings about is himself, his demons, fears, or his passions.

The album's first single, "Bullet to the Heart", was released on September 24 and is about overcoming the obstacles and hardships experienced while pursuing a dream. "On the Rocks" depicts the image of speaking the truth before getting drunk, but never giving up the obsession with love. The album's second single was "Dway!", published on October 22, and expresses Wang's pride towards his achievements and his conviction that he's able to master his life. The title is a word play with the Chinese word "对", which means "I'm right". The full album was released on October 25, 2019 along with a music video for "Titanic", a collaboration song with Indonesian singer and rapper Rich Brian. In the music video, Wang dances with Asian dance group Kinjaz.

== Critical reception ==
Professional ratings
Review scores
Source	Rating
Clash	8/10

About the album, Clash said "Jackson Wang's solo career is set to truly shine. [...] What's most impressive about the record [...] is the brilliant range of distinct sounds the young artist has managed to cover in eight short tracks; no track sounds like another and that sets the bar really high for whatever he comes out with next. Connections of the heart, the career he has worked for and his conviction in seeing himself through the hard journey, and a celebration of his Asian culture to boot, makes up Jackson Wang's debut album – and it's hard to find any glaring faults with it barring the slow start of the first few tracks and a wish that the record was longer than just a total of 20 minutes." It also indicated "Titanic" as the highlight of the record.

Jeff Benjamin from Billboard wrote "The album's title of Mirrors is a perfect fit as an album shooting a real, sometimes harsh, reflection of one's true self. It's a change-up from the previously announced Journey to the West title Jackson was previously playing, as these eight songs all look to be a larger meditation on Wang as a human rather than about a crossover attempt. [...] One of Mirror's standout tracks "Bad Back" shines as one of the most interesting on the album as it seems to have multiple layers to representing Jackson as both an artist and as a person" and "Mirrors felt like a journey of self-discovery with a tracklist that showcased new sides of Jackson as an artist."

Daniel Spielberger of HipHopDX deemed the record heartfelt but unoriginal, lacking a knock-out hit and lyricism.

== Commercial performance ==
Upon its release, "Bullet to the Heart" debuted at #1 on the Billboard China Chart and peaked at #1 on the China Social Chart.

In the November 3–9 week, the album placed #32 on Billboard 200, becoming the highest-charting debut album ever from a Chinese artist. In the same week, it also debuted on other Billboard's charts: it placed #3 on Digital Albums Chart, #1 on Independent Albums Chart, #2 on Rap Album Sales Chart, #3 on Digital Albums Chart, #4 on Top Album Sales Chart and Top Current Albums Chart, #18 on Top Rap Albums Chart, and #22 on Top R&B/Hip-Hop Albums Chart.

== Track listing ==
Credits adapted from NetEase Music.

Mirrors track listing
No.	Title	Lyrics	Music	Length
1.	"Bullet to the Heart"	Jackson Wang; Gregory "Aldae" Hein	Jackson Wang; Gregory "Aldae" Hein; The Roommates	2:26
2.	"On the Rocks"	Wang; Sean Turk; Kyle "Ko" Owens; Hein; Maurice "Barney Bones" Powell	Wang; Sean Turk; Kyle "Ko" Owens; Hein; Maurice "Barney Bones" Powell	3:09
3.	"Dway!"	Wang; Sebastian Lopez; Bijan Amirkhani; Amber Marie Sassman; Jake Asher Rahman; Ray "August Grant" Jacobs; Powell; Hein	Wang; Sebastian Lopez; Bijan Amirkhani; Amber Marie Sassman; Jake Asher Rahman; Ray "August Grant" Jacobs; Powell; Hein	2:25
4.	"Unless I'm With You"	Wang; Hein; Seunghyo Hahm; Christian Dold; Mathias Rosenholn	Wang; Hein; Seunghyo Hahm; Christian Dold; Mathias Rosenholn	2:27
5.	"Bad Back (feat. GoldLink)"	Wang; Montana Wayne Best; Hahm; Turk; GoldLink	Wang; Montana Wayne Best; Hahm; Turk; GoldLink	2:42
6.	"Titanic (feat. Rich Brian)"	Wang; Michael Graham Oatman; Rich Brian; Paolo Rodriguez	Wang; Michael Graham Oatman; Rich Brian; Paolo Rodriguez	2:21
7.	"Faded"	Wang; Alexander Hewitt; Luis Angel Fuentes; Amber Marie Sassman; Jake Asher Rahman	Wang; Alexander Hewitt; Luis Angel Fuentes; Amber Marie Sassman; Jake Asher Rahman	2:37
8.	"爱 (I Love You 3000 Chinese version)"	Wang; Stephanie Poetri	Wang; Stephanie Poetri	3:30
Total length:				21:37

== Accolades ==
Accolades for Mirrors
Year	Award	Category	Result	Ref.
2019	NetEase Cloud Music 2019 Music List	Best Selling Digital Album of the Year	Won	
2019	NetEase Cloud Music 2019 Music List	Most Popular Chinese Album of the Year	Won	
2019	NetEase Cloud Music 2019 Music List	Most Popular Pop Album of the Year	Won	
2020	Channel R Radio Awards	Best Album	Nominated	

== Charts ==
Chart performance for Mirrors
Chart (2019)	Peak position
Australian Digital Albums (ARIA)	18
French Digital Albums (SNEP)	62
UK Digital Albums (OCC)	83
US Billboard 200	32
US Top Album Sales (Billboard)	4
