= He Jiong =

Chinese television host

- 何炅
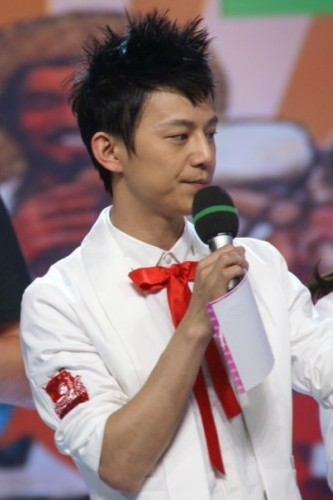
- He Jiong in 2009
- Born: 28 April 1974 (age 52); Changsha, Hunan, China
- Education: Beijing Foreign Studies University
- Occupations: Host, actor, singer, director
- Years active: 1994–present
- Known for: Happy Camp; Big Pinwheel

He Jiong (Chinese: 何炅; pinyin: Hé Jiǒng, born 28 April 1974) is a Chinese television host, singer, actor, director and a former Arabic lecturer at Beijing Foreign Studies University. He is best known for co-hosting the Hunan TV variety show Happy Camp (1997–2021). He ranked 70th on the Forbes China Celebrity 100 list in 2005, 19th in 2006, 35th in 2007, 49th in 2008, 49 in 2009, 82nd in 2010, 90th in 2011, 97th in 2012, 73 in 2013, 77th in 2014, 88th in 2015, 41st in 2017, 45th in 2019, 53rd in 2020.

== Early life and education ==
He Jiong was born on 28 April 1974 in Yuhua District, Changsha, Hunan, China. His father, He Wei (Chinese: 何畏; pinyin: Hé Wèi), who was a professor of philosophy, ran a seafood restaurant chain. His elder brother He Hao (Chinese: 何昊; pinyin: Hé Hào) is a military personnel. In 1986, He enrolled in the High School Attached to Hunan Normal University.

In September 1992, he was admitted to study Arabic at Beijing Foreign Studies University. After graduating in July 1997, he became a lecturer of Arabic at his alma mater, during which time he used an Arabic name "Anwar" (Arabic: أنور, lit. 'luminous'). He and the university agreed to adjust the content of his work in 2007, in order for him to focus on his hosting career. He resigned from the position in January 2015.

== Career ==
In 1995, He, under the nickname "Brother Thumb" (大拇哥), hosted the children's television show Big Pinwheel on CCTV-1 together with fellow host Liu Chunyan. In 1998, after receiving recognition for his work on the CCTV, He, along with Li Xiang, began hosting Hunan TV's variety show Happy Camp, in what would become one of the most successful shows produced by the Hunan Broadcasting System, and one of the most popular shows in Chinese television history.

For the next few years, He established himself as one of the most prominent hosts in Mainland China, simultaneously hosting variety shows, music shows, cooking contests, and New Years Galas for Hunan, Beijing, and CCTV. In 2004, He debuted as a singer with the album Keyi Ai (Chinese: 可以爱), featuring Gardenia in Blossom as the main single. In 2005, He starred as the main character in the historical drama Emperor Zheng De. In 2006, He was cast for the Stan Lai stage play Secret Love for the Peach Blossom Spring. The same year, the introduction of Du Haitao and Wu Xin into mainstream media led to the establishment of the Happy Family, consisting of He, Xie Na, Li Weijia, Du, and Wu.

In 2007, He hosted the Chinese singing competition Super Boy, a spin-off of the show Super Girl, a competition that encouraged millions of Chinese netizens to democratically vote for progression in the show. The following year, He hosted the first three episodes of the talk show Day Day Up, taking over for fellow host Wang Han. In 2009, He, along with Wang, hosted the second season of Super Girl.

In 2013, He, together with the Happy Family, starred in the comedy film Bring Happiness Home. Since 2015, He has hosted the cooking show Go Fridge, a spin-off of Please Take Care of My Refrigerator, with Jackson Wang of Got7. The same year, He made his film director debut with the teen romance Forever Young, a film based on his debut single Gardenia in Blossom. In March 2016, He featured as a permanent cast on the variety program Who's the Murderer. Since 2017, together with Henry Lau and Huang Lei, He has been a cast member for the reality show Back to Field, a show that featured the simplistic lifestyles away from city centers. In 2019, He began hosting the reality show An Exciting Offer.

In 2022, following the unexpected closure of the show Happy Camp, which marked the end of its 24-year run, He began hosting Hello, Saturday as its replacement program.

He Jiong currently holds the Guinness World Record as the most-followed male celebrity on the Chinese social media platform Weibo, with over 115 million followers, as of February 2023.

== Filmography ==
=== Television hosting ===
==== Ongoing ====
- Hello, Saturday (from January 2022)

==== 1998 ====
- Happy Camp in Hunan Channel (March 1998 - September 2021)

==== 2013 ====
- I Am a Singer in Hunan Channel

==== 2015 ====
- UP IDOL (偶像来了)
- 为她而战
- Go Fridge Season 1 with Jackson Wang (Got7)
- Happy Camp in Hunan Channel (From March 1998 until now)
- Season 2 of Are you normal (你正常吗) with Ella Chen (S.H.E)

==== 2016 ====
- Who's the Murderer Season 1
- Fresh Sunday (透鲜滴星期天) MC with Jackson Wang (Got7)
- Go Fridge Season 2 MC with Jackson Wang (Got7)
- Are you normal Season 3 (你正常吗3) with Henry Lau (Super Junior M)
- MC show Happy Camp in Hunan Channel (From March 1998 until now)

==== 2017 ====
- Back to Field Season 1
- Go Fridge Season 3 MC with Jackson Wang (Got7)
- Who's the Murderer Season 2
- Who's the Murderer Season 3
- MC show Happy Camp in Hunan Channel (From March 1998 until now)

==== 2018 ====
- Back to Field Season 2
- Go Fridge Season 4 MC with Jackson Wang (Got7)
- Who's the Murderer Season 4
- Who's the Keyman
- MC show Happy Camp in Hunan Channel (From March 1998 until now)

==== 2019 ====
- I Actor (演员的品格)
- Go Fridge Season 5
- Back to Field Season 3
- The Miracle Chinese Language (神奇的漢字)
- Who's the Murderer Season 5

==== 2020 ====
- Go Fridge Season 6
- Back to Field Season 4
- Welcome Back to Sound
- Who's the Murderer Season 6

=== Films ===
Year	English title	Chinese title	Role
2003	Girls’ Diary		
2009	Mars Baby	火星寶貝	Guest performer
2010	Journey to the West		
2010	My Sassy Girl 2	我的新野蛮女友	Zhikai
2011	Chase Our Love	宅男總動員之女神歸來	Mian Mian
2011	Speed Angels	極速天使	He Qiwei
2012	The Lion Roars 2		Guest performer
2012	The Monkey King: Uproar in Heaven	大鬧天宮3D	Nezha (voice)
2012	Today Tomorrow	今天.明天	
2013	Bring Happiness Home	快樂到家	
2013	Running All the Way	一路狂奔	
2013	The Midas Touch	超级经理人	Nancy's Brother
2013–present	I Am a Singer/Singer	我是歌手/歌手	Host/Presenter
2014	The True Love		
2014	Where are We Going, Dad?	爸爸去哪兒	
2014	Lock Me Up, Tie Him Down	完美假妻168	
2015	Forever Young		Director
2015	Bride Wars	新娘大作戰	
2016	A Chinese Odyssey Part Three	大話西遊3	Erlang Shen
2017	Kick Ball	仙球大戰	
2017	What a Wonderful Family		
2018	The Trough	低壓槽	

=== Television series ===
- 2004, Zhengde Emperor (正德皇帝)
- 2005, Do Not Love Me (别爱我)
- 2006, Never Make A Woman in Tears (不该让女人流泪)
- 2008, Ugly Wudi (guest performer) (丑女无敌)
- 2009, Beauties Best (guest performer) (美女不坏)
- 2009, Take My Breath Away (guest performer) (丝丝心动)
- 2016, Shuttle Love Millenium (guest performer) (相愛穿梭千年2：月光下的交換)
- 2017, Midnight Diner (guest performer)
- 2019, Reset Life (guest performer)

=== Theatre ===
- 2003 I Will Make Whatever You like (想吃麻花现给你拧)
- 2006 The Peach Blossom Land (暗恋桃花源)
- 2014 21克拉
- 2016 Writing in Water (水中之书)

== Bibliography ==
- 1998, 9: This Is How I Grow Up (炅炅有神——我是这样长大的)
- 2000, 10: Happy Like Me (快乐如何)
- 2001, 10: Just Ok (刚刚好)
- 2005, 4: Wonderful Happiness (最好的幸福)
- 2015: 来得及

== Discography ==
=== Albums ===
- 1st Studio Be worth loving (可以爱)

Released: 19 April 2004
Label: Hao Music

- 2nd Studio Wander around (漫游)

Released: 23 June 2005
Label: Hao Music

- 3rd Studio Myself (自己)

Released: 5 December 2006
Label: Hao Music

- 4th Studio Happy family (快乐你懂的)

Released: 21 September 2010
Label: EE-Media

- 5th Studio Good times (美好岁月)

Released: 24 September 2010
Label: EE-Media

=== MV Music Works ===
- 2010 Love Story 我们约会吧 (He Jiong / Huang Yunling)
- 2010 Snowflake雪花 (He Jiong / Li Sheng)
