= Team Wang =

Chinese record label

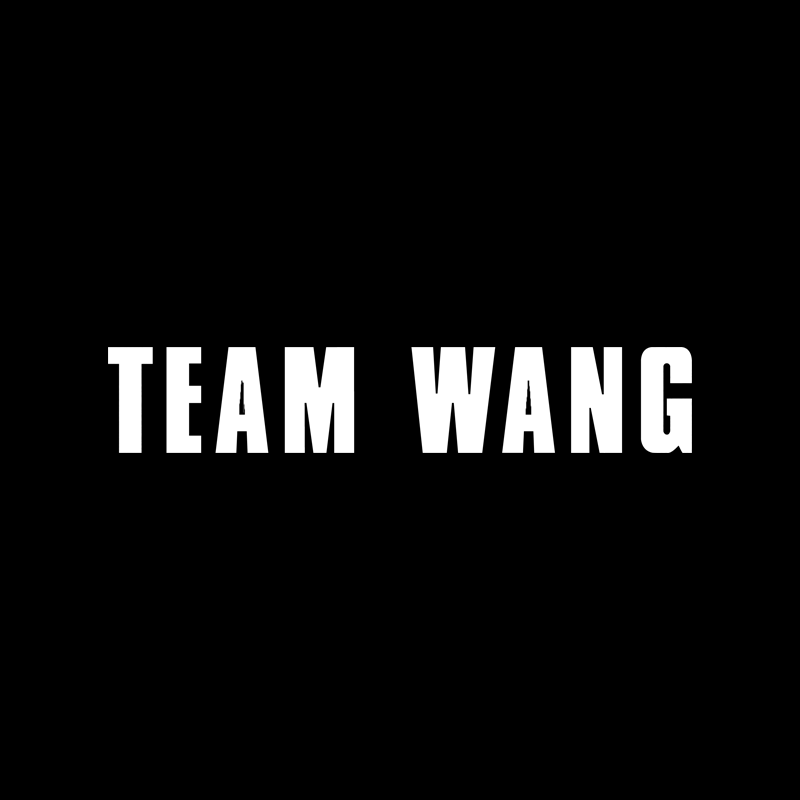
- Founded: 2017
- Founder: Jackson Wang
- Genre: Hip hop; R&B; Mandopop
- Country of origin: China

Team Wang is a record label founded by rapper and singer Jackson Wang. The label was established in 2017 and conducts business in music, production, and artist management. In 2020, Team Wang Design was launched, where Jackson Wang serves as the creative director and designer.

== Label history ==
Team Wang is an international record label, originating from China. Jackson Wang founded Team Wang in 2017, and subsequently, the label's first release was Wang's single "Papillon" on 26 August 2017. Team Wang started with two employees and grew to almost 30 in 2019.

On 25 October 2019, Team Wang released Wang's first full-length English album, Mirrors. The album reached #1 on Billboard's independent music chart. Mirrors reached #32 on the Billboard 200, the highest-charting debut album from a Chinese artist. The album featured American rapper GoldLink and Indonesian rapper Rich Brian.

Other Team Wang releases include Wang's singles "100 Ways" and "Pretty Please", a collaboration with Swedish dance music duo Galantis. In December 2020, the label released Wang's Chinese single, "Should've Let Go", with JJ Lin. On 17 April 2023, Wang released the single "Slow", in collaboration with American singer Ciara.

Team Wang has teamed up with 88rising for some releases; in 2020 it partnered with esports organization Victory Five, while in 2021, it established music partnerships with Sublime and Ryce Entertainment.

== Artists ==
=== Recording artists ===
Groups

- Panthepack

Soloists

- Ice
- Jackson Wang
- J.Sheon
- Karencici
- Xenzu
- Laurie
