= CMIC Music Awards =

Annual Chinese music award ceremony

- Country: China
- Presented by: China Audio-Video and Digital Publishing Association
- First award: July 20, 2017
- Final award: January 26, 2022
- Website: Official website

The CMIC Music Awards (simplified Chinese: 唱工委音乐奖; traditional Chinese: 唱工委音樂獎), commonly abbreviated as CMA, is an annual music award show presented by China Audio-Video and Digital Publishing Association. CMIC stands for China Music Industry Committee. Modelled after The Grammys and The BRIT Awards, CMIC Music Awards aim to create a more fair evaluation of music without influences from sponsors and focusing on artistry over entertainment.

The 1st CMIC Music Awards ceremony was held on July 20, 2017. It was held annually until 2020. On January 10, 2022, CMIC Music Awards resumed and announced nominees from 2020 and 2021. It has been on hiatus since.

== Ceremonies ==
Ceremony	Date	Venue	Location	Ref.
1st CMIC Music Awards	July 20, 2017	M Space	Beijing	
2nd CMIC Music Awards	July 31, 2018	Star Park	Beijing	
3rd CMIC Music Awards	July 31, 2019	Star Park	Beijing	
4th & 5th CMIC Music Awards	January 26, 2022	Online	Online	

== Categories ==
- Album of the Year
- Song of the Year
- Male Singer of the Year
- Female Singer of the Year
- Band of the Year
- Duo/Group of the Year
- New Artist of the Year
- Best Pop Album
- Best Pop Solo Performance
- Best Rock Album
- Best Rock Performance
- Best Contemporary Folk Album
- Best Contemporary Folk Performance
- Best Electronic Music Album
- Best Electronic Music Performance
- Best Chinese Traditional Vocal Album
- Best Chinese Traditional Instrumental Album
- Best Rap Album
- Best Rap Performance
- Best Jazz Vocal Album
- Best Jazz Instrumental Album
- Best Contemporary Classical Composition Album
- Best Classical Performance Album
- Best Score Soundtrack for Visual Media
- Best Score Soundtrack for Video Game
- Best Children's Album
- Best Lyrics
- Best Composition
- Best Arrangement
- Best Production for Record, Non-Classical
- Best Production for Album, Non-Classical
- Best Engineered Recording
- Best Mixed Recording
- Best Visual Design
- Best Music Video
- Chairman's Award
- Outstanding Contribution Award

== Major awards winners ==
	1st		2nd		3rd		4th		5th	
Album of the Year	Jay Chou	Jay Chou's Bedtime Stories	Pu Shu	Orion	Sandy Lam	0	Dou Wei & Difference	Carambola Garden	Omnipotent Youth Society	Inside the Cable Temple
Song of the Year	Zhao Lei	"Chengdu"	Song Dongye	"GuoYuanChao"	Jonathan Lee	"Newly Written Old Song"	Jay Chou & Ashin	"Won't Cry"	Tan Weiwei	"Xiao Juan"
Male Artist of the Year	Khalil Fong	Journey to the West	JJ Lin	Message in a Bottle	Joker Xue	Freak	Zheng Jun	Sounds Good	Joker Xue	Extraterrestrial
Female Artist of the Year	Sandy Lam	in Search of Lost Time	A-Mei	Story Thief	Sandy Lam	0	Yisa Yu	Walking By the World	Tan Weiwei	3811
Band of the Year	Hanggai	Horse of Colors	Re-TROS	Before the Applause	Hedgehog	The Sound of Life	Mr. Sea Turtle	Kamihamiha	Omnipotent Youth Society	Inside the Cable Temple
Group of the Year	Shanghai Rainbow Chamber Singers	A Tale of Two Cities	RADIO MARS	Radio Mars	Rocket Girls 101	Calorie	Mr. Miss	I Had Two Extra Drinks at Your Wedding	Electric Cherry	Baby, I Hear the Sound of the Galaxy
New Artist of the Year	Chen Hongyu	Poetry Radio Under the Smoke	Xu Jun	29	Lexie Liu	2029	Accusefive	Somewhere in Time	Mandarin	Mandarin

== Most wins ==
Artist	Number of awards	Notes
Jay Chou	7	Received "Best Composer" Award 3 times
Tan Weiwei	4	
Sandy Lam	3	First artist to receive 2 major awards (Album of the Year and Artist of the Year); Received "Artist of the Year" 2 times
Jolin Tsai	3	Received "Best Pop Album" and "Best Pop Performance" in the same year
Aduo	3	Received "Best Ethnic/Folk Vocal Album" 2 times
Jonathan Lee	3	Received "Best Lyricist" 2 times
Joker Xue	3	Received "Artist of the Year" 2 times
Omnipotent Youth Society	3	Second artist to receive 2 major awards (Album of the Year and Band of the Year)
Hanggai	3	
Moxi Zishi	3	
MaSiWei	2	Received "Best Rap Album" and "Best Rap Performance" in the same year
No Party for Cao Dong	2	Received "Best Rock Album" and "Best Rock Performance" in the same year
Lang Lang	2	Received "Best Classical Interpretation Album" 2 times
Xiao Xu Music	2	Received "Best Video Game Soundtrack/Score" 2 times
Annsey Zhao	2	Received "Best Album Design/Visual Design" 2 times
Zhao Lei	2	
Starr Chen	2	
Chen Hongyu	2	
Kafe.Hu	2	
Zhang Gasong	2	
James Li	2	
Li Ronghao	2	
Dou Wei	2	
Orange Ocean	2	
Re-TROS	2	
