= Chizi =

Chinese stand-up comedian (born 1995)

- 池子
- Born: Wang Yuechi (王越池); October 6, 1995 (age 30); Henan, China
- Other name: 暴躁95后
- Occupation: Stand-up comedian
- Years active: 2015–present
- Agent(s): Shanghai Xiao Guo Culture Media (until August 2020) mplus (萌扬文化) (from November 2020)
- Notable work: Tonight 80's Talk Show; Roast! (吐槽大会)

Wang Yuechi (Chinese: 王越池; pinyin: Wáng Yuèchí, born October 6, 1995), known by his stage name Chizi (Chinese: 池子; pinyin: Chízǐ), is a Chinese stand-up comedian who rose to prominence on Roast! (吐槽大会) and Rock & Roast (脱口秀大会) between 2017 and early 2019. In 2023, a stand-up routine performed in North America led to his blacklisting in mainland China. He staged an overseas comeback in 2026.

== Career ==
Chizi was born in Henan, China. At primary school, he moved to Beijing with his family.

After dropping out in his final year of high school and spending several years unemployed, he stumbled upon the Beijing Stand-up Comedy Club (北京脱口秀俱乐部) online and joined in 2015. After four months in August, he debuted in a bar as stand-up comedian during an "open-mic" session. From there, he was invited by Li Dan, a stand-up comedian, to join Tonight 80's Talk Show and later became one of its recurring guests. In 2017, he participated in the production various stand-up comedy-centric television programmes in China such as Roast! (吐槽大会) and Rock & Roast (脱口秀大会).

In January 2019, after the third season of Roast!, Chizi announced on Weibo that he would not return to the show.

In January 2020, due to financial dispute, Chizhi proposed a termination of his contract with his managing agent, Shanghai Xiao Guo Culture Media. Both parties entered into an arbitration proceeding. On May 6, he accused on Weibo that China CITIC Bank had acquiesced to Xiao Guo's request for his bank transactions details without his approval. On May 7, the bank admitted that the matter was not done in accordance to the regulations and fired the branch manager involved in the unauthorized disclosure of customer's information. On August 12, the contract was terminated peacefully. The matter was settled out of courts and Chizi agreed not to discuss about the contract termination publicly going forward. In March 2021, CITIC Bank was fined CN¥4.5 million by the China Banking and Insurance Regulatory Commission due to the unauthorized disclosure.

On November 16, 2020, Chizi was signed to mplus (萌扬文化). On December 9, he hosted his first in-person stand-up comedy show.

In November 2021, he shut down his Weibo account, where he had 4.7 million followers.

In February 2023, while touring North America, he touched on topics that were sensitive to China, incl on Uhygur, Covid policy and Chinese censorship system. He was being blacklisted on various platforms in China.

In 2022, he opened a stand-up club in Shanghai, which was shut down after roughly a year following reports of uncensored performance content. He staged a comeback tour across Asia in 2026.

== Personal life ==
Chizi was married to Zhang Le (张乐), a director of Roast!, until their separation in 2022. The marriage had not been publicly disclosed until 2023, when a former employer of the couple revealed it online while accusing them of failing to pay staff wages for a project aborted by Chizi's blacklisting. The employer also alleged that Chizi's marriage had broken down due to his affair with influencer Li Huiyue (李惠玥), better known online as Dou De'er (豆得儿). Li responded by condemning Chizi for deceiving her, stating that she had been unaware he was married when they were together.

== Appearances ==
Television series
Year	Title	Role	Ref.
2016	今晚80后脱口秀	Recurring guest	
2016	Roast! (吐槽大会)	Recurring guest	
2017	Rock & Roast (脱口秀大会)	Recurring guest	
2017	Roast! Season 2		
2018	Roast! Season 3	Recurring guest	
2018	没想到吧	Recurring guest	
2018	My Future (我是未来)	Season 2 host	
2021	Strawberry Man (草莓星球来的人)	Host	
