= Ban Yu =

Chinese writer

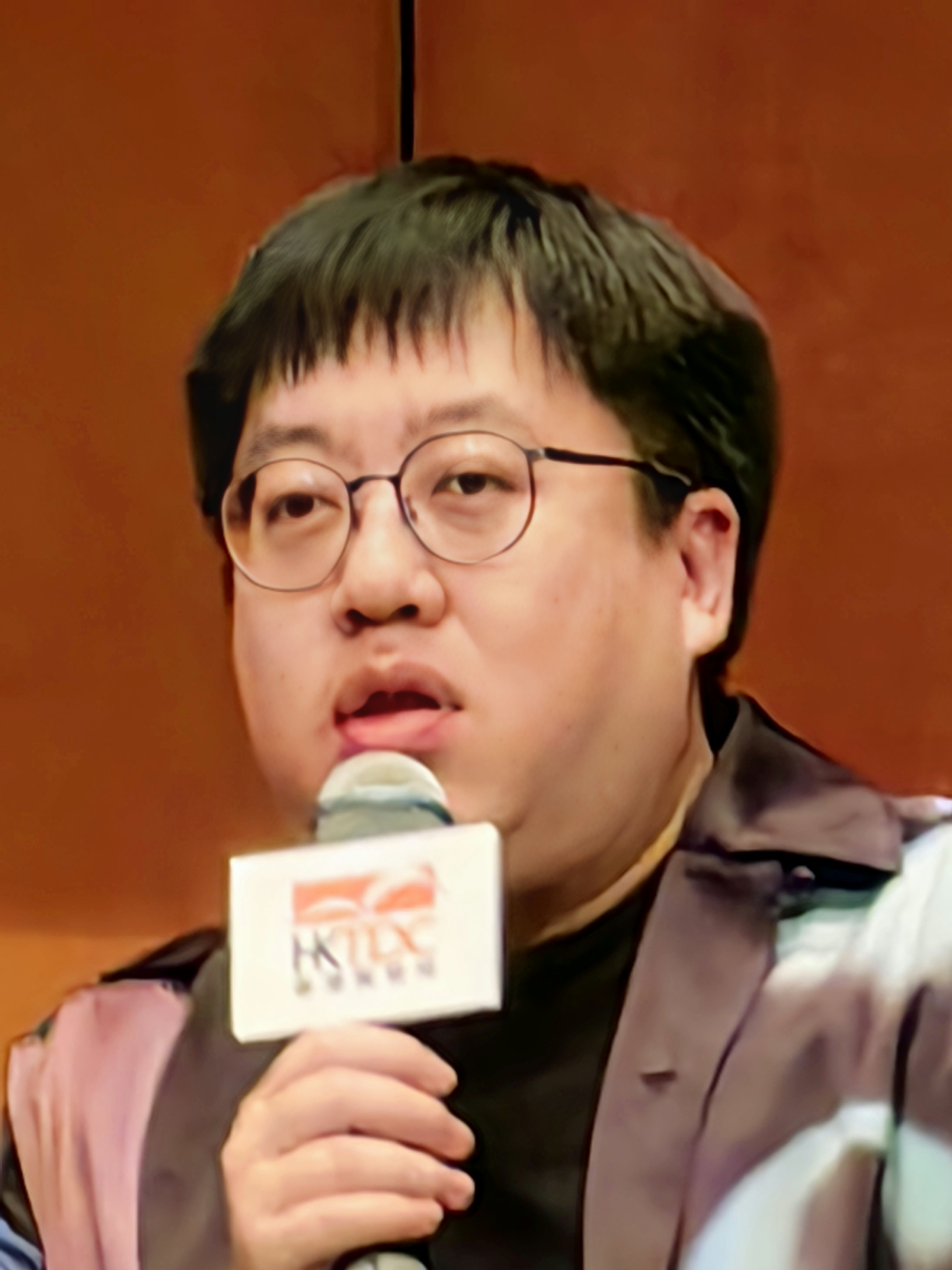
- Ban Yu at the 2024 Hong Kong Book Fair
- Born: 1986 (age 39–40) Shenyang,Liaoning,China
- Occupation: novelist
- Education: Northeastern University at Qinhuangdao
- Notable works: Winter Swim
- Notable awards: the 4th Mao Dun Newcomer Award、the 19th Hundred Flowers Literature Award for Short Stories

Ban Yu (Chinese: 班宇; born 1986, in Shenyang) is a contemporary Chinese novelist. He is recognized as one of the "Three Masters of the Northeast Literary Revival" and a writer of the New Northeast Writers Group. He graduated from Northeastern University at Qinhuangdao with a degree in computer science.

== Early life and career ==
Born in 1986 in Workers' Village, Tiexi, Shenyang, Ban Yu studied computer science at Northeastern University's Qinhuangdao Branch from 2005 to 2009. After graduating, he worked as an editor at a publishing house until August 2020. In 2007, he began writing music reviews part-time for music magazines.

== Literary beginnings and recognition ==
In 2017, following a friend's suggestion, Ban Yu participated in the 4th Douban Reading Essay Contest and began writing his first novel, Hitting You Always on a Rainy Day: Blues Stories from Workers' Village, which won first prize in the comedy story group. In 2018, he published his short story collection Winter Swim. In December 2020, his short story collection Carefree Roaming was published. On December 18, 2021, Winter Swim received the 19th Hundred Flowers Literature Award for Short Stories. In September 2022, he was awarded the 4th Mao Dun Newcomer Award. In November 2023, he began working at the Wuhan Institute of Literature and Art Theory (Fangcao Magazine).

== Family ==
Ban Yu's family has deep ties to the Shenyang Transformer Factory. His paternal grandfather, originally from Tianjin, was a veteran of the Chinese People's Volunteer Army. After the Korean War, he was demobilized and transferred to Shenyang for work, where he joined the Shenyang Transformer Factory. Both his maternal grandfather and his parents also worked at the Shenyang Transformer Factory. His father, a factory worker, was laid off in 2001.
