= Inside the Cable Temple =

Studio album by Omnipotent Youth Society
- Released: December 2020
- Genres: Progressive rock, folk rock, jazz rock
- Length: 44:22
- Language: Chinese

Inside the Cable Temple (Chinese: 冀西南林路行; pinyin: Jì xīnán lín lù xíng) is the second album by Chinese rock band Omnipotent Youth Society. The album was the band's first release in a decade, and was inspired by the natural landscape of the band's home province of Hebei and in particular the Taihang Mountains.

== Development ==
The album was initially inspired by a train ride the band members took through the Taihang Mountains surrounding their home city of Shijiazhuang. The lyrics are inspired by the relationship of humans to nature and the natural landscape of Northeast China. Because of its past as a manufacturing center and geographical position, the city of Shijiazhuang is one of the most polluted in the world. The surrounding Taihang Mountains are heavily affected by unregulated private mining. The aftereffects of this inspired the lyrics and music of Cable Temple. For instance, the tracks 泥河 ("Muddy River") and 采石 ("Quarrying") relate to the impact of technology on both people and the natural environment, with "Quarrying" expressing the destruction of the Taihang Mountains. The track 河北墨麒麟 ("Dark Qilin of Hebei") describes a qilin forced to breathe polluted air. The final track on the album, 郊眠寺 ("Cable Temple") concerns the class divide and pollution.

Compared to the band's first album, it has a more mellow, bluesy sound, punctuated with moments of intense drama. The album is a mix of jazz, folk, prog rock, and chamber folk. It was intended to be listened to as one continuous work, but, in consideration of typical listening habits, the band split it into 8 tracks.

== Reception ==
Due to the ten-year hiatus that occurred after the band's first album release, Inside the Cable Temple was highly anticipated by fans. The release was accompanied by a note from the band: "Thank you all for your patience with this album. The trajectories and answers are recorded in these 44 minutes and 22 seconds." The album soon reached #1 of the Douban music charts, and three tracks from the album made up the top three of that day's top singles on NetEase. The streaming platform wrote that "They used 10 years to sharpen a sword." The Paper praised the album's thoughtful and evocative lyricism, connecting the new release with the renaissance in interest in Dongbei culture in China.

== Track listing ==
In some releases, the album is formatted as a single track, with the same title as the album.

All lyrics are written by Ji Geng; all music is composed by Dong Yaqian.

No.	Title	Length
1.	"早 ('Morning')"	1:23
2.	"泥河 ('Muddy River')"	5:48
3.	"平等云雾 ('Equal Mist')"	1:26
4.	"采石 ('Quarrying')"	8:56
5.	"山雀 ('Titmouse')"	3:18
6.	"绕越 ('Bypassing')"	2:43
7.	"河北墨麒麟 ('Dark Qilin of Hebei')"	11:28
8.	"郊眠寺 ('Cable Temple')"	9:40
Total length:		44:22
