= Rock & Roast =

Chinese standup comedy show

- Genre: Stand-up Comedy
- Written by: Wang Jianguo, Cheng Lu
- Directed by: Tan Xiaohong
- Presented by: Chizi, Li Dan, Zhang Shaogang
- Starring: Li Xueqin, Yang Li, Wowkie Zhang，Zhang Yuqi, Luo Yonghao
- Country of origin: China
- Original language: Chinese

Production
- Running time: 90 - 120 minutes
- Production company: Xiao Guo Culture、Tencent Penguin Pictures

Original release
- Network: Tencent Video
- Release: 2017 – 2022

Related
- Roast! Tonight 80's Talk Show; Stand-up Comedy and its Friends

Rock & Roast (Chinese: 脱口秀大会; pinyin: Tuōkǒuxiù Dàhuì), is a Chinese online stand-up comedy competition series produced by Shanghai Xiaoguo Culture Media Co., Ltd. (笑果文化) in partnership with Tencent Video. Premiering in 2017, the show features amateur and professional comedians performing original stand-up routines, often drawing from personal experiences, social issues, and everyday absurdities in contemporary Chinese life. It has become a cornerstone of China's burgeoning stand-up comedy scene, credited with popularizing the genre among urban youth and fostering a new generation of performers. As of 2022, the series had aired five seasons, amassing billions of views while sparking discussions on humor, gender, and censorship.

== Development ==
Stand-up comedy arrived in China in the early 2010s, initially through experimental clubs like the Beijing Talk Show Club, founded in 2010. Early broadcasts, such as Tonight 80s Talk Show (2012–2017) on Dragon TV, introduced the format to mainstream audiences but struggled with limited appeal. Rock & Roast marked a turning point when Xiaoguo Culture, led by comedian and chief content director Li Dan, partnered with Tencent to launch the series in August 2017.

The show's English title, "Rock & Roast," combines "rock" as an exclamation of excellence (e.g., "You rock!") with "roast," referencing the American tradition of comedic roasts where performers mock public figures for entertainment. Unlike traditional Chinese comedic forms like xiangsheng (crosstalk) or xiaopin (小品), which often rely on dialogue or scripted narratives, Rock & Roast emphasizes solo, monologue-style performances adapted from Western stand-up. Its format has been analyzed in academic studies for blending imported humor techniques with local cultural critiques, contributing to the genre's rapid growth in China.

The first season featured over 30 contestants vying for the title of "Talk King," with routines judged by celebrity panels and live audiences. It quickly gained traction, culminating in Pang Bo (庞博) as champion and setting the stage for annual iterations.

Subsequent seasons expanded the format. Season 2 (2019) introduced "Roast Battle" segments for instant head-to-head critiques, while Season 3 (2020) highlighted emerging female voices amid the COVID-19 pandemic. Season 5 (2022) debuted with over 50 performers, including veterans like Yang Li, and emphasized the slogan "Everyone Can Be Happy for Five Minutes" to underscore accessible humor. Guest judge panels included actress Song Jia, veteran singer Na Ying, author Liu Zhenyun and musician Zheng Jun.

A planned sixth season in 2023 was suspended due to regulatory scrutiny following a controversy involving a comedian's joke about the People's Liberation Army, leading to fines and industry-wide content restrictions.

The series has driven the expansion of China's stand-up infrastructure, from fewer than 10 clubs in 2018 to over 179 by 2021, alongside a 50% rise in offline shows. It faced criticism for conservative scoring and self-censorship.

== Format ==
Each season consists of 10–12 episodes, typically 90–120 minutes long, streamed exclusively on Tencent Video. Contestants, often from diverse backgrounds like IT engineers or factory workers, submit scripts for pre-approval before performing 5–10 minute solos. Performances are scored by "laughter leaders" (领笑员)—a panel of comedians and celebrities—who award "lights" based on wit and originality, combined with audience votes via app.

In the first season, contestants were grouped in to two groups and were led by Li Dan and Chizi respecttively. Later seasons include group challenges and elimination brackets, with top performers advancing to semifinals and a grand finale "Roast Battle," where rivals exchange improvised barbs. The winner receives the "Talk Show King/Queen" title and opportunities for tours or endorsements. Host Li Dan often interjects with commentary, framing the show as a space for "funny people talking about funny things".

== Notable performers ==
Rock & Roast has launched careers for performers like Pang Bo (Season 1 champion), Li Xueqin (李雪琴, Season 3 standout for her relatable "loser" persona), and Zhou Qimo (周奇墨, multiple-season winner). Female comedians have been particularly transformative: Yang Li's Season 3 routine mocking "average yet confident" men went viral, amassing 2.15 million Weibo followers and igniting feminist debates on misogyny. The Yan twins ( 颜怡 and 颜悦) used synchronized acts to subvert gender stereotypes, while Niao-Niao (鸟鸟) addressed "social phobia" and body shame, resonating with young women's experiences.

== Reception and controversies ==
Critically, Rock & Roast holds strong ratings, with Season 1 earning 70% four- or five-star reviews on Douban. It has been praised for democratizing comedy, enabling non-celebrities to address social issues like urban alienation. However, detractors argue it prioritizes virality over depth, with some routines criticized as "provocative" or formulaic.

The show has influenced pop culture, with routines inspiring memes and boosting live comedy's commercial viability. Scholars note its role in negotiating "positive energy" rhetoric under censorship, allowing subtle critiques of neoliberal pressures like work stress and relationships. Internationally, it has drawn comparisons to U.S. shows, with guest Joe Wong praising its evolution from "scratch."

Censorship has been a persistent challenge. Beijing authorities fined Xiaoguo 200,000 yuan in 2021 for "vulgar" content, and the 2023 scandal involving comedian Li Haoshe's military joke led to his apology, the host's temporary ban, and the sixth season's cancellation. This incident, analyzed in media reports, underscored tensions between humor's transgressive potential and state controls on "negative energy." Despite this, the show has empowered feminist discourse, with female performers using irony to challenge patriarchal norms, as explored in studies on affective humor.

Rock & Roast has professionalized stand-up in China, spawning spin-offs like Little Rock & Roast and fueling a multibillion-yuan industry. Its cultural footprint includes over 6 billion Weibo interactions and a surge in female-led clubs. As one academic review notes, it represents "modern feminism's playful intervention" in a censored landscape, blending laughter with subtle resistance. The series continues to evolve, with Xiaoguo training new talents amid calls for bolder, less restricted content.
