= List of awards and nominations received by Jackson Wang =

Jackson Wang awards and nominations
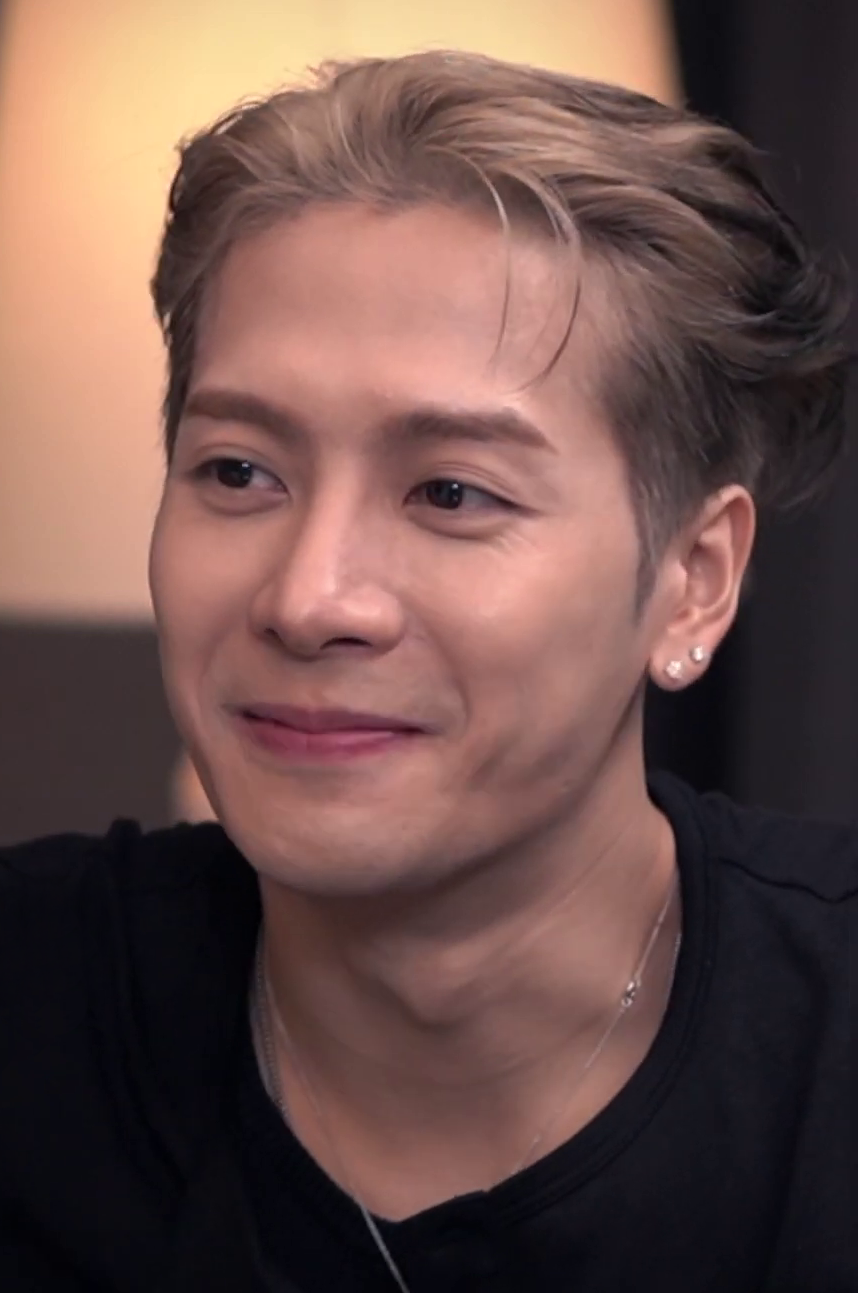
- Wang in 2025
Awards and nominations
| Award | Wins | Nominations |
| American Advertising Awards | 5 | 5 |
| Asian Music Gala | 1 | 1 |
| Asian Pop Music Awards | 11 | 25 |
| Bazaar Gala | 2 | 2 |
| Bazaar Icons Party | 2 | 2 |
| Berlin Music Video Awards | 0 | 1 |
| C-Pop Hit Show | 2 | 2 |
| Channel R Radio Awards | 2 | 5 |
| Chinese Top Ten Music Awards | 3 | 3 |
| Clio Awards | 1 | 1 |
| CMIC Music Awards | 1 | 3 |
| Esquire Gentle Gala | 1 | 1 |
| Esquire Man At His Best (MAHB) Awards | 1 | 1 |
| Global Chinese Golden Chart Awards | 1 | 1 |
| Global Chinese Music | 1 | 1 |
| GQ Men of the Year Awards | 1 | 1 |
| Hanteo Music Awards | 0 | 1 |
| Hollywood Music Video Awards | 0 | 1 |
| I-Magazine Fashion Face Awards | 0 | 1 |
| iHeartRadio Music Awards | 0 | 2 |
| iQiyi Scream Night | 1 | 1 |
| Leader of the Year Awards | 1 | 1 |
| MBC Entertainment Awards | 0 | 1 |
| Metro Radio Hong Kong Music Awards | 1 | 1 |
| NetEase Annual Music Awards | 1 | 1 |
| NetEase Attitude Awards | 1 | 1 |
| NetEase Cloud Music Awards | 5 | 7 |
| NetEase Indie Music Awards | 1 | 1 |
| Philippine K-pop Awards | 1 | 1 |
| SBS Entertainment Awards | 1 | 1 |
| Teen Choice Awards | 1 | 1 |
| Tencent Video All Star Night | 3 | 3 |
| Top Chinese Music Awards | 1 | 1 |
| UK Music Video Awards | 0 | 2 |
| Universe Boom Super Sphere Awards | 1 | 1 |
| Urban Music Awards | 0 | 1 |
| Wave Music Awards | 1 | 9 |
| Weibo Music Awards | 9 | 16 |
| Weibo Night | 5 | 7 |
| Weibo Star Award (Hong Kong) | 1 | 1 |

Totals (Note: Certain award groups do not simply award one winner. They acknowledge several different recipients, have runners-up, and have third place. Since this is a specific recognition and is different from losing an award, runner-up mentions are considered wins in this award tally. For simplification and to avoid errors, each award in this list has been presumed to have had a prior nomination.)
- Wins: 65
- Nominations: 113

This is a list of awards and nominations received by Jackson Wang, a Hong Kong rapper, since his debut in 2014. The artist has received a total of 64 awards out of 112 nominations.

== Awards and nominations ==
Name of the award ceremony, year presented, award category, nominee(s) of the award, and result of nomination
| Award ceremony | Year | Category | Nominee(s)/work(s) | Result | Ref. |
|---|---|---|---|---|---|
| American Advertising Awards | 2023 | Gold Winners – Best Virtual Production | "Come Alive" music video | Won | |
| American Advertising Awards | 2023 | Gold Winners – Best Virtual Production | "Cruel" music video | Won | |
| American Advertising Awards | 2023 | Gold Winners – Best CGI | "Come Alive" music video | Won | |
| American Advertising Awards | 2023 | Gold Winners – Best CGI | "Cruel" music video | Won | |
| American Advertising Awards | 2023 | Best of Winners – Best Virtual Production | "Cruel" music video | Won | |
| Asian Music Gala | 2017 | MTV Special Award | Jackson Wang | Won | |
| Asian Pop Music Awards | 2021 | Best Collaboration Award | "Should've Let Go" | Nominated | |
| Asian Pop Music Awards | 2021 | People's Choice Award (Chinese) | Jackson Wang | Won | |
| Asian Pop Music Awards | 2022 | Best Album of the Year (Chinese) | Magic Man | Nominated | |
| Asian Pop Music Awards | 2022 | Record of the Year (Chinese) | "Blow" | Nominated | |
| Asian Pop Music Awards | 2022 | Best Music Video (Chinese) | "Cruel" | Nominated | |
| Asian Pop Music Awards | 2022 | Best Male Artist (Chinese) | Jackson Wang | Won | |
| Asian Pop Music Awards | 2022 | Top 20 Best Albums of the Year (Chinese) | Magic Man | Won | |
| Asian Pop Music Awards | 2022 | People's Choice Award (Chinese) | Jackson Wang | Won | |
| Asian Pop Music Awards | 2023 | Song of the Year (Chinese) | "Why Why Why" | Nominated | |
| Asian Pop Music Awards | 2023 | Top 20 Songs of the Year (Chinese) | "Why Why Why" | Won | |
| Asian Pop Music Awards | 2023 | People's Choice Award (Chinese) | "Why Why Why" | Won | |
| Asian Pop Music Awards | 2023 | Record of the Year (Chinese) | "Cheetah" | Won | |
| Asian Pop Music Awards | 2023 | Best Music Video (Chinese) | "Cheetah" | Nominated | |
| Asian Pop Music Awards | 2023 | Best Dance Performance (Chinese) | "Cheetah" | Nominated | |
| Asian Pop Music Awards | 2023 | Best Collaboration (Chinese) | "Slow" | Nominated | |
| Asian Pop Music Awards | 2024 | Best Collaboration (Overseas) | "Feeling Lucky" | Nominated | |
| Asian Pop Music Awards | 2024 | Top 20 Songs of the Year (Overseas) | "Feeling Lucky" | Won | |
| Asian Pop Music Awards | 2025 | Best Album of the Year | Magic Man 2 | Nominated | |
| Asian Pop Music Awards | 2025 | Top 20 Albums of the Year | Magic Man 2 | Won | |
| Asian Pop Music Awards | 2025 | Best Collaboration | "Buck" | Won | |
| Asian Pop Music Awards | 2025 | Best Music Video | "GBAD" | Nominated | |
| Asian Pop Music Awards | 2025 | Best Male Artist | Jackson Wang | Nominated | |
| Asian Pop Music Awards | 2025 | Best Lyricist | "Made Me a Man" (with Alexis Andrea Boyd, Louis Bartolini and Sayak Das) | Nominated | |
| Asian Pop Music Awards | 2025 | Best Producer | Magic Man 2 (with his production team) | Nominated | |
| Asian Pop Music Awards | 2025 | People's Choice Award | Jackson Wang | Won | |
| Bazaar Gala | 2025 | Bazaar King | Jackson Wang | Won | |
| Bazaar Gala | 2026 | MVP of the Year | Jackson Wang | Won | |
| Bazaar Icons Party | 2021 | Musician of the Year | Jackson Wang | Won | |
| Bazaar Icons Party | 2023 | Global Influence Icon of the Year | Jackson Wang | Won | |
| Berlin Music Video Awards | 2026 | Best Cinematography | "Buck" | Nominated | |
| C-Pop Hit Show | 2021 | Male Singer of the Year (Hong Kong and Taiwan) | Jackson Wang | Won | |
| C-Pop Hit Show | 2021 | Top Ten Songs of the Year | "Drive You Home" | Won | |
| Channel R Radio Awards | 2020 | Best Male Solo Artist | Jackson Wang | Won | |
| Channel R Radio Awards | 2020 | Best Album | Mirrors | Nominated | |
| Channel R Radio Awards | 2020 | Best Collaboration | "Pretty Please" | Won | |
| Channel R Radio Awards | 2021 | Best Collab | "Drive You Home" | Nominated | |
| Channel R Radio Awards | 2021 | Best Song | "LMLY" | Nominated | |
| Chinese Top Ten Music Awards | 2021 | Most Influential Male Singer in Asia | Jackson Wang | Won | |
| Chinese Top Ten Music Awards | 2021 | Best Male Singer (Hong Kong and Taiwan) | Jackson Wang | Won | |
| Chinese Top Ten Music Awards | 2021 | Best Pop Collaboration | "Should've Let Go" | Won | |
| Clio Awards | 2026 | Bronze Award | "GBAD" music video | Won | |
| CMIC Music Awards | 2020 (Note: Held in 2022.) | Male Singer of the Year | Jackson Wang | Nominated | |
| CMIC Music Awards | 2020 | Best Music Video | "Oxygen" | Nominated | |
| CMIC Music Awards | 2021 (Note: Held in 2022.) | Best Music Video | "Pretty Please" | Won | |
| Esquire Gentle Gala | 2021 | Annual Musical Artist | Jackson Wang | Won | |
| Esquire Man At His Best (MAHB) Awards | 2017 | Fashion Music Man of the Year | Jackson Wang | Won | |
| Global Chinese Golden Chart Awards | 2018 | The Most Popular Newcomer of The Year | Jackson Wang | Won | |
| Global Chinese Music | 2021 | Best Original Music Award | "Alone" | Won | |
| GQ Men of the Year Awards | 2021 | All-round Artist of the Year Award | Jackson Wang | Won | |
| Hanteo Music Awards | 2023 | Artist of the Year | Jackson Wang | Nominated | |
| Hollywood Music Video Awards | 2026 | Best Shot on Phone Award | "Let Loose" | Nominated | |
| I-Magazine Fashion Face Awards | 2016 | Asian Male | Jackson Wang | Nominated | |
| iHeartRadio Music Awards | 2026 | World Artist of the Year | Jackson Wang | Nominated | |
| iHeartRadio Music Awards | 2026 | Favorite K-pop Collab | "Buck" | Nominated | |
| iQiyi Scream Night | 2017 | Song of the Year | "Papillon" | Won | |
| Leader of the Year Awards | 2025 | Leader of the Year – Culture and Entertainment | Jackson Wang | Won | |
| MBC Entertainment Awards | 2016 | Rookie Award in Variety Show | Real Men | Nominated | |
| Metro Radio Hong Kong Music Awards | 2024 | Most Broadcast Song | "Feeling Lucky" | Won | |
| NetEase Annual Music Awards | 2025 | Most Influential Artist of the Year | Jackson Wang | Won | |
| NetEase Attitude Awards | 2017 | Most Attitude Hip Hop Singer/Composer of The Year | Jackson Wang | Won | |
| NetEase Cloud Music Awards | 2019 | Chinese Male Artist of the Year | Jackson Wang | Nominated | |
| NetEase Cloud Music Awards | 2019 | Best Selling Digital Album of the Year | Mirrors | Won | |
| NetEase Cloud Music Awards | 2019 | Most Popular Chinese Album of the Year | Mirrors | Won | |
| NetEase Cloud Music Awards | 2019 | Most Popular Pop Album of the Year | Mirrors | Won | |
| NetEase Cloud Music Awards | 2019 | Most Popular Collaboration of the Year | "I Love You 3000 II" | Won | |
| NetEase Cloud Music Awards | 2019 | Most Popular Single of the Year | "I Love You 3000 II" | Nominated | |
| NetEase Cloud Music Awards | 2020 | Most Popular MV of the Year | "100 Ways" | Won | |
| NetEase Indie Music Awards | 2021 | Best Male Artist of the Year | Jackson Wang | Won | |
| Philippine K-pop Awards | 2014 | Hottest Male Award | Jackson Wang | Won | |
| SBS Entertainment Awards | 2014 | Best Male Rookie Award - Variety | Roommate | Won | |
| Teen Choice Awards | 2018 | Choice Next Big Thing | Jackson Wang | Won | |
| Tencent Video All Star Night | 2016 | Annual Variety Star Award | Go Fridge | Won | |
| Tencent Video All Star Night | 2017 | Breakthrough Singer of the Year | "Papillon" | Won | |
| Tencent Video All Star Night | 2023 | Most Influential Overseas Artist of the Year | Jackson Wang | Won | |
| Top Chinese Music Awards | 2016 | Most Popular Variety Show CP of the Year (with He Jiong) | Go Fridge | Won | |
| UK Music Video Awards | 2025 | Best Pop Video – International | "High Alone" | Nominated | |
| UK Music Video Awards | 2025 | Best Colour Grading in a Video | "High Alone" | Nominated | |
| Universe Boom Super Sphere Awards | 2021 | Music Stage Award | Jackson Wang | Won | |
| Urban Music Awards | 2023 | Artist of the Year (Asia) | Jackson Wang | Nominated | |
| Wave Music Awards | 2023 | Best Male Artist | Jackson Wang | Nominated | |
| Wave Music Awards | 2023 | Record of the Year | "Blow" | Nominated | |
| Wave Music Awards | 2023 | Best Pop Album | Magic Man | Won | |
| Wave Music Awards | 2023 | Best Album Production | Magic Man | Nominated | |
| Wave Music Awards | 2023 | Best Song Arrangement | "Blue" | Nominated | |
| Wave Music Awards | 2023 | Best Music Video | "Blow" | Nominated | |
| Wave Music Awards | 2023 | Best Rap Song | "Jackson Wang" | Nominated | |
| Wave Music Awards | 2025 | Best Song Arrangement | "Henny" | Nominated | |
| Wave Music Awards | 2026 | Best Male Singer | Jackson Wang | Pending | |
| Weibo Music Awards | 2022 | Top 10 Recommended Singers of the Year | Jackson Wang | Won | |
| Weibo Music Awards | 2022 | Top 10 Recommended MVs of the Year | "Cruel" | Won | |
| Weibo Music Awards | 2022 | Top 10 Recommended Performance IP of the Year | Jackson Wang Panthepack 2021 Tour | Won | |
| Weibo Music Awards | 2023 | Top 10 Recommended Singers of the Year | Jackson Wang | Won | |
| Weibo Music Awards | 2023 | Top 10 Recommended MVs of the Year | "Cheetah" | Won | |
| Weibo Music Awards | 2023 | Singer of the Year (Hong Kong and Taiwan) | Jackson Wang | Won | |
| Weibo Music Awards | 2024 | Creative Pioneer Artist of the Year | Jackson Wang | Won | |
| Weibo Music Awards | 2024 | Top 10 Recommended MVs of the Year | "Feeling Lucky" | Won | |
| Weibo Music Awards | 2025 | Recommended Song of the Year | "GBAD" | Nominated | |
| Weibo Music Awards | 2025 | Recommended MV of the Year | "Made Me a Man" | Nominated | |
| Weibo Music Awards | 2025 | Recommended Person of the Year (Chinese Singer) | Jackson Wang | Nominated | |
| Weibo Music Awards | 2026 | Song of the Year | "Deadend" | Nominated | |
| Weibo Music Awards | 2026 | MV of the Year | "Wanderers of the World" | Nominated | |
| Weibo Music Awards | 2026 | Concert of the Year | Magic Man II World Tour | Nominated | |
| Weibo Music Awards | 2026 | Artist of the Year | Jackson Wang | Nominated | |
| Weibo Music Awards | 2026 | International Musician of the Year | Jackson Wang | Won | |
| Weibo Night | 2017 | Popular Artist of the Year | Jackson Wang | Won | |
| Weibo Night | 2019 | Weibo Original Musician of the Year | Jackson Wang | Won | |
| Weibo Night | 2020 | Male God of the Year | Jackson Wang | Won | |
| Weibo Night | 2020 | Person of the Year | Jackson Wang | Nominated | |
| Weibo Night | 2020 | Weibo King | Jackson Wang | Nominated | |
| Weibo Night | 2023 | Musician of the Year with Quality Performance Internationally | Jackson Wang | Won | |
| Weibo Night | 2025 | International Influential Singer of the Year | Jackson Wang | Won | |
| Weibo Star Award (Hong Kong) | 2017 | Popularity Award | Jackson Wang | Won | |

== Other accolades ==
=== Listicles ===
Name of publisher, year listed, name of listicle, and placement
| Publisher | Year | Listicle | Placement | Ref. |
|---|---|---|---|---|
| The Business of Fashion | 2023 | The BoF 500 | — | |
| Forbes | 2019 | China Celebrity 100 | 40th | |
| Forbes | 2020 | China Celebrity 100 | 41st | |
| Forbes | 2021 | China Celebrity 100 | 10th | |
| Forbes | 2020 | 100 Digital Stars (Asia) | — | |
| Forbes | 2023 | 30 Under 30 (China) | — | |
| Forbes | 2024 | Bold Pioneers Selection (China) | — | |
| Gold House | 2023 | A100 List of Asian Pacific Leaders in Entertainment and Media | — | |
| Hypebeast | 2024 | Hypebeast 100 Hall of Fame | — | |
| Tatler Asia | 2024 | Asia's Most Influential – Entertainment (Hong Kong) | — | |
| TME Charts | 2021 | 30 Under 30 – Singers | — | |
| TME Charts | 2022 | 30 Under 30 – Singers | — | |
| TME Charts | 2023 | 30 Under 30 – Singers | — | |
