= Li Dan (stand-up comedian) =

Chinese screenwriter and media personality

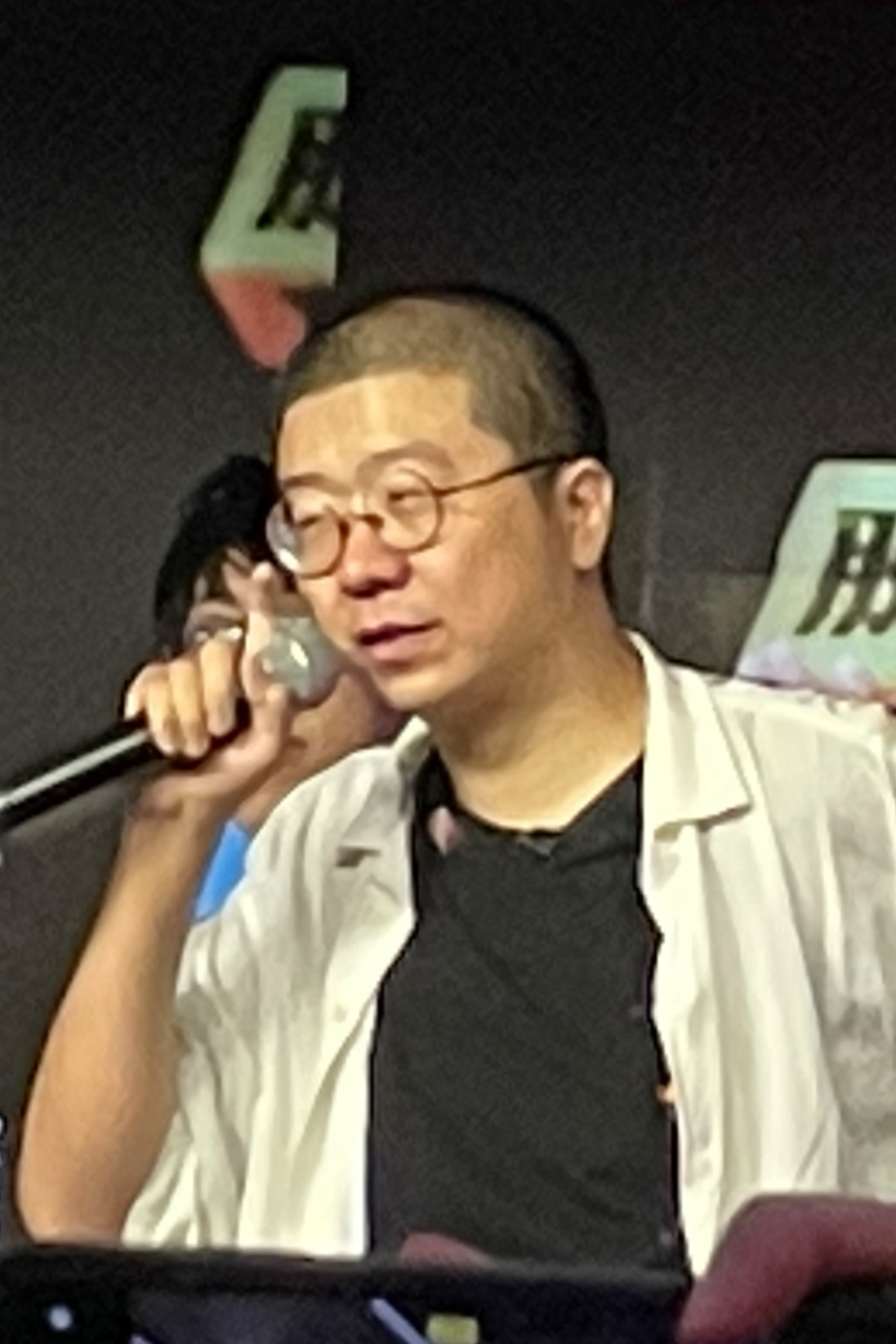
- Li in 2021
- Born: Li Ruichao (李瑞超); September 2, 1989 (age 37); Inner Mongolia, China
- Occupations: Stand-up comedian, screenwriter, author, producer, livestreamer
- Years active: 2012–present
- Spouse: Chen Dian (m. 2018; dissolution 2021)

Li Dan (Chinese: 李诞; pinyin: Lǐ Dàn; born 2 September 1989), is a Chinese stand-up comedian, screenwriter, author, and media personality. Often dubbed the "father of stand-up comedy" in China, he co-founded Xiaoguo Culture and rose to prominence through his satirical humor addressing social issues, youth culture, and everyday dilemmas. Li was the creative mind behind popular comedy shows like Tonight 80's Talk Show and Rock & Roast, amassing millions of followers on platforms like Weibo. In recent years, he has pivoted to livestreaming on Xiaohongshu, offering advice on relationships and life.

== Early life and education ==
Li was born on 2 September 1989 in Inner Mongolia, China. He was raised in a modest family among the harsh wilderness of the grassland. He pursued higher education at the South China Agricultural University, majoring in sociology. His university years were spent on extensive reading of classical literature, Buddhist texts, drinking, and writing on Weibo.

== Career ==
=== Early career ===
Li entered the entertainment industry in 2012 as a screenwriter for Shanghai Television’s'Tonight 80's Talk Show" (今晚80后脱口秀). The program introduced stand-up comedy to mainstream Chinese audiences with satirical commentary on work, family, and relationships. Li’s sharp wit and relatable humor earned him recognition, transitioning him from behind-the-scenes work to on-stage performances.

In 2014, Li co-founded Shanghai Xiao Guo Culture Media Co., Ltd. (上海笑果文化传媒有限公司), serving as chief content executive, and holding a 4.58% ownership stake. Xiao Guo produced live shows, online content, and talent incubators, establishing comedy as a viable career path in a country where it was previously niche.

=== Rise to fame ===
Li’s breakthrough came in 2017 with "Roast!"(吐槽大会, tucao dahui) and ''Rock & Roast'' (脱口秀大会, tuokouxiu dahui), produced by Xiao Guo and streamed on Tencent. Blending Western roast formats with Chinese cultural nuances, the shows featured celebrities and comedians delivering sharp, self-deprecating humor. They became a cultural phenomenon, spawning multiple seasons and cementing Li’s reputation as the “king of punchlines.” These shows popularized stand-up comedies by addressing sensitive topics like workplace conflicts, campus bully, and gender bias with sharp, satirical humor. Li Dan was credited by many for making stand-up comedy mainstream in China.

In 2023, Li led a stand-up tour across 13 North American cities hosted by Xiaoguo Culture and Canada based Lima Media, featuring 13 Chinese comedians including Yang Li and Li Haoshi.

=== Controversies and hiatus ===
In May 2023, Xiaoguo Culture faced a nationwide performance ban after comedian Li Haoshi made a controversial joke about the People's Liberation Army during a Beijing show. The incident led to an official investigation and speculation that Li Dan might have been blacklisted from public appearances.

Earlier, in 2021, Li faced backlash over promotional slogans for Ubras underwear, criticized as vulgar and insulting. He issued a public apology, acknowledging the need for greater gender sensitivity. In 2022, his endorsement with luxury brand Tod’s sparked debate due to his controversial public image.

=== Livestreaming ===
By summer 2024, about a year after the Li Haoshi incident, Li Dan reemerged on Xiaohongshu (RedNote) as a live streamer. Attracting millions of viewers, his livestreams blend humor with emotional counseling, primarily targeting the platform's largely female audience. Li addresses topics like love, relationships, and personal growth, often drawing from his own publicized divorce and skepticism toward marriage, earning him the nickname "a girl’s digital bestie." His approach features a "soft sell" style, with affiliate product links scrolling during sessions while he responds to questions such as navigating multiple suitors or dealing with personal betrayals. Reminiscent of 1990s Chinese late-night radio shows, Li's irreverent yet empathetic delivery transforms emotional venting into a lively, carnivalesque spectacle, offering a humorous outlet for a generation disillusioned with romantic ideals.

== Personal life ==
Li married Chen Dian in 2018 and divorced in 2021. He remains unmarried, frequently exploring themes of singledom and emotional detachment in his comedy and livestreams.
