= Li Haoshi controversy =

Event involving Chinese stand-up comedian

On 13 May 2023, while performing in Beijing, Chinese stand-up comedian Li Haoshi (Chinese: 李昊石; pinyin: Lǐ Hàoshí) used a Chinese military slogan ("capable of winning battles, and have good style") to praise his pet dogs. For these remarks, he was accused of insulting the People's Liberation Army (PLA). Li and the comedy firm he worked with faced severe consequences: the firm was heavily fined and banned from future performances and Li's contract was terminated. On 17 May 2023, the Chaoyang branch of the Beijing Municipal Public Security Bureau issued a statement claiming that they had opened a case to investigate the event, leading to the possibility of the matter escalating into a criminal case.

== Background ==
On 11 March 2013, Xi Jinping, the then General Secretary of the Central Committee of the Chinese Communist Party (CCP) and the Chairman of the Central Military Commission of the CCP, the paramount leader of China, put forward his "Party's objective of strengthening the Army" at the plenary meeting of the PLA delegation of the 1st Session of the 12th National People's Congress as follows:

To build a People's Army that follows the Party's command, is capable of winning battles, and has good style is the Party's objective of strengthening the Army under the latest circumstances.
(Chinese: 建设一支听党指挥、能打胜仗、作风优良的人民军队，是党在新形势下的强军目标。)

— Xi Jinping

Since then, the three phrases—"follow the Party's command" (Chinese: 听党指挥; pinyin: tīng Dǎng zhǐhuī), "be capable of winning battles" (Chinese: 能打胜仗; pinyin: néng dǎ shèngzhàng), and "have good style" (Chinese: 作风优良; pinyin: zuòfēng yōuliáng), have become the core slogans of the PLA and have been widely used on a variety of occasions.

Li Haoshi, a 31-year-old stand-up comedian, was working with Shanghai Xiaoguo Culture Media Co., Ltd. (Chinese: 上海笑果文化传媒有限公司; pinyin: Shànghǎi Xiàoguǒ Wénhuà Chuánméi Yǒuxiàn Gōngsī), an artist management company and stand-up comedy club established in May 2014 and headquartered in Shanghai.

== Incident ==
During two offline performances that took place on 13 May 2023 in Beijing, Li Haoshi shared an anecdote about his two adopted dogs. He said that after he moved to Shanghai, he adopted two feral dogs from the hills near his residence because he felt motivated to align his endeavours with international expectations. He then recalled his first encounter with the dogs, where they were chasing after a squirrel fiercely, "like two fired shells". Li then said that those two dogs were different from others, because while other dogs would make the impression of being adorable and cute, those two had left him none other than "eight big characters flickering in his mind"—"having good style and are capable of winning battles". He finished his story by praising his two dogs for being "excellent" and giving him "majestic feelings" while walking them on the streets.

His remarks were later shared on Sina Weibo, a Chinese social media platform similar to Twitter, by a state journalist who claimed Li's words made them uncomfortable since they felt Li was insulting the PLA by citing the military slogans to praise his dogs. Some people thought he was insinuating that PLA soldiers were dogs. Some believed he was making an allusion the 1956 Chinese propaganda war film Shangganling, where Chinese soldiers were portrayed chasing squirrels for fun.

== Aftermath ==
=== Repercussions for Li and Shanghai Xiaoguo Culture Media ===
As public opinion intensified, the company Li worked with, Shanghai Xiaoguo Culture Media, released a statement on 15 May 2023, claiming that they had seriously criticised Li and indefinitely terminated his future performance. Li's name was also removed from the company's list. Li released an apologetic message on Sina Weibo, stating that he would "take all the responsibility" and "reflect profoundly". Later, his account on Sina Weibo was suspended. As of 18 May 2023, Li's account on Sina Weibo had been revoked, citing the account was reported to have violated laws, regulations, and Sina Weibo's community rules. The Beijing Cultural Law Enforcement Team claimed they had opened a case to investigate this event, with the headquarters of Shanghai Xiaoguo Culture Media being investigated by the Shanghai Municipal Administration of Culture and Tourism, both on 15 May 2023.

On 17 May 2023, Shanghai Xiaoguo Culture Media was fined over 13 million yuan by the Beijing Municipal Bureau of Culture and Tourism, with 1.3 million yuan of revenue deemed as "illegally obtained property" being confiscated. The company was also barred from staging any future performances indefinitely in both Beijing and Shanghai. The fines totalled more than US$2 million.

The company then terminated its contract with Li. The China Association of Performing Arts reprimanded Li's remarks and called for its member bodies to boycott him. On the same day, the Chaoyang branch of the Beijing Municipal Public Security Bureau issued a statement, accusing Li of seriously insulting the People's Army and "[causing] an execrable effect on society". The branch also said that they opened a case for a criminal probe, further escalating the situation. Li was arrested, and could spend up to three years in prison. However, in a 2024 interview with The New Yorker, a friend stated that Li is looking at opportunities in a different industry.

=== Repercussions for others ===
According to a statement by the Ganjingzi branch of the Dalian Public Security Bureau released on 17 May 2023, a 34-year-old woman with the surname Shi (Chinese: 史; pinyin: Shǐ) was caught the day before and put in administrative detention for a remark on Sina Weibo supporting Li. Other comedy companies cancelled scheduled performances, raising concerns about the prospects of mainland China's entire stand-up comedy industry. According to an analyst quoted by Reuters, space for humour and expression in mainland China is likely to shrink further after this incident.

== China's Stand-up Comedy and Censorship ==
Stand-up comedy, although a relatively new import from the West, has gained popularity among young Chinese in recent years. Open mic events have proliferated across cities in China, attracting aspiring comedians and audiences. In 2021 alone, there were approximately 18,500 live performances, generating nearly 400 million yuan in revenue, according to the China Association of Performing Arts. The industry continued to grow in 2022, even during the harsh lockdowns implemented in response to the COVID-19 pandemic.

Multibillion-dollar companies are inviting standup comedians to their annual meetings or hiring them to boost their products' images. In early July 2021, China's state media Xinhua News Agency employed standup comedy in a video to refute the COVID-19 lab leak theory.

Stand-up comedy as a form of entertainment allows young people to approach their joys and frustrations in a lighthearted way. It provided a source of consolation and connection for individuals during the grueling lockdowns in Shanghai. However, even before Li's case, the industry faced various layers of censorship. A writer involved in scripting comedy shows shared a now-removed Weibo post revealing a long list of taboo topics, including senior Party leaders, homosexuality, poverty, and the pandemic. Scripts had to go through multiple rounds of scrutiny, with the potential impact of jokes and their sensitivity being discussed.

The fear of reprisal makes Chinese comedians cautious, but that caution, some say, also takes the edge off their humour.

== Similar cases ==
Similar cases have been reported in mainland China in recent years. In 2018, the Law of the People's Republic of China on the Protection of Heroes and Martyrs was passed by the Standing Committee of the National People's Congress, the legislature of mainland China, while the National People's Congress is not sitting, and was signed into law by Xi Jinping, the president. While it was aimed to protect the reputation of deceased people that were deemed as "heroes and martyrs" by the Chinese authorities, it has also been used extendedly on living "heroes" whose reputations were deemed "infringed". At the end of 2020, the 11th Amendment to the Criminal Law of mainland China was passed and enacted, adding Article 299-I, formally encoded the crime of "infringing the honour and reputation of heroes and martyrs" into the Criminal Law.

In 2021, former journalist Qiu Ziming (Chinese: 仇子明; pinyin: Qiú Zǐmíng) was sentenced to eight months of imprisonment for the crime of "infringing the honour and reputation of heroes and martyrs" for his remarks on Sina Weibo questioning the number of casualties of Chinese soldiers during the 2020–2021 China–India skirmishes. In 2022, Luo Changping (Chinese: 罗昌平; pinyin: Luó Chāngpíng), a former journalist of China Business Herald and the former editor-in-chief of The Beijing News, was sentenced to fixed-term imprisonment of seven months for the crime of "infringing the honour and reputation of heroes and martyrs" for a 6 October 2021 post on Sina Weibo questioning the legitimacy of the participation of Chinese troops in the Korean War.

== See also ==
- Censorship in China
- Human rights in China
- Stand-up Comedy in China
