= Yang Li (stand-up comedian) =

Chinese stand-up comedian

- 杨笠
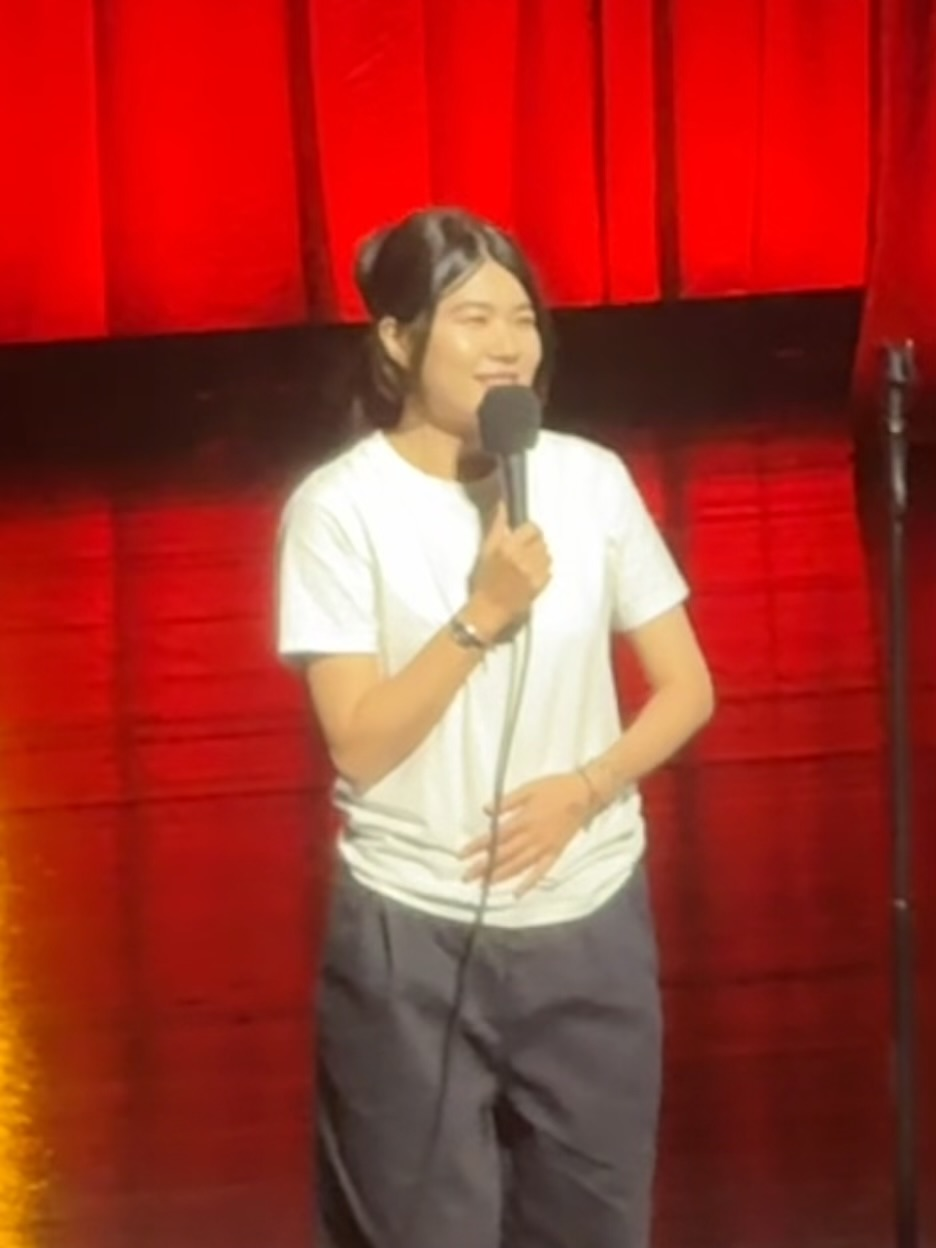
- Yang Li performing in her tour, September 2025
- Born: 1992 (age 33–34); Hebei, China
- Education: Beijing Institute of Fashion Technology
- Occupations: stand-up comedian, scriptwriter
- Years active: 2018–present
- Employer(s): Shanghai Xiaoguo Culture Media Co., Ltd.

Yang Li (Chinese: 杨笠; pinyin: yáng lì; born 1992) is a Chinese stand-up comedian and scriptwriter. Most known for her iconic punchline on the male psyche, "How can he be so average, yet so full of confidence?", Yang rose to fame in a Chinese stand-up comedy competition series Rock & Roast. Tackling controversial gender issues with humour and sarcasm, she received outpouring support as well as overwhelming backlash, stirring up a fierce online debate. The catchphrase "average-yet-confident" went viral on the Chinese social media platform Weibo and became one of the most popular memes among feminist internet users in 2020. Meanwhile, male netizens have accused Yang of "sexism" and "man-hating", provoking gender opposition. Critics have characterised Yang and her followers as unreasonable feminists who "demand privilege", while supporters defend Yang to be articulating the female perspective silenced in a patriarchal society.

== Early life ==
Yang comes from a family in rural Hebei. In 2014, she graduated with a bachelor's degree in animation from the Beijing Institute of Fashion Technology. After graduating, she worked as a graphic designer and a production assistant before getting involved in stand-up comedy in 2017. She joined Shanghai Xiaoguo Culture Media Co., Ltd. in October 2018.

== Career ==
=== 2014–2017: Early roles ===
After graduating from university in 2014, Yang has worked as a graphic designer with two different companies. Finding it difficult for her personal style to be appreciated by the clients, she left her job as a designer after six months. Thereafter, she worked in Beijing Tianqiao Performing Arts Centre for a year as a production assistant. However, realising that this job could not fulfill herself, she quit and stayed at home for 7 to 8 months. Out of anxiety, she kept drawing self-portraits as a means to communicate with herself. It was during that time that she was introduced to stand-up comedy. After a year of experience as an unprofitable stand-up comedy enthusiast, Yang officially joined Xiaoguo Culture in 2018 and kickstarted her career.

=== 2018–2019: Career beginnings ===
Yang started out in the company as a scriptwriter for the Chinese television show Roast!: Season 3 in 2018. In 2019, she made her appearance in the Chinese stand-up comedy contest Rock & Roast: Season 2. Yang took part in four recordings and ranked bottom twice, placing 10th overall. Later that year, she became an executive writer for Roast!: Season 4.

=== 2020–present: Rising to fame ===
In 2020, Yang caught her big break by participating in Season 3 of the competition series Rock & Roast where she achieved 4th place. Yang rose to fame with her satirical monologue on the self-involvement of men. She established a character by addressing controversial gender issues with her self-deprecating sense of humour.

Yang took the internet by storm with her iconic punchline on the male psyche: "How can he be so average, yet so full of confidence?" The catchphrase went viral on Weibo and became one of the most popular memes among feminist internet users in China. Her social commentary received agreement and applause from a large audience. "Average-yet-confident" has swiftly been taken up by women to describe their experiences of men with outsized egos who are oblivious to the privileges associated with their gender.

On October 13, 2021, Yang achieved 6th place in Season 4 of Rock & Roast.

== Filmography ==
Year	Title	Role	Notes
2018	Roast!: Season 3	scriptwriter	
2019	Roast!: Season 4	scriptwriter	
2019	Rock & Roast: Season 2	contestant	ranked 10th place
2020	Rock & Roast: Season 3	contestant	ranked 4th place
2020	She Has Emotions, So What?	co-host	
2020	Share Life	co-host	
2021	Roast!: Season 5	contestant	
2021	Rock & Roast: Season 4	contestant	ranked 6th place

== Selected extracts ==
=== Rock & Roast: Season 3 Episode 2 ===
- Yang joked about the portrayal of women in the Marvel Cinematic Universe. "In 'The Avengers', there are six heroes, and only one of them is a woman", she said, referring to Black Widow, a female superhero in Marvel's Avengers series. She went on to question the superpower of Black Widow whose body is modified to slow down ageing. Yang queried: "Why should our imagination about women always focus on how young, beautiful, and fit they are? Why couldn't a female hero become old?"

=== Rock & Roast: Season 3 Episode 5 ===
- "Men are adorable," Yang said while feigning a confused look, "but mysterious...How can he be so average, yet so full of confidence?"
- She drew an example by comparing male students with their female counterparts in a Chinese classroom. While female students with high grades are often troubled by not scoring perfectly, Yang noticed, some male classmates seem unfazed by their poor performance. "You feel he owns the whole world", she said, comparing a male student with female students who score 85 percent or higher, "He can prance around the room with his exam papers held high. 'Look at me, I got a 40. I'm a fool.'"
- "Unlike women, who always think of themselves as unimportant, men always think of themselves as the centre of the universe. Every single sentence from men carries utmost importance, and points out the right direction in which the world should advance", Yang jokingly concluded, "So when your female friend comes to you, you might wonder: 'Is she hoping to share her sadness with me? No, she must be hoping to learn something from me!'"

=== Talk Show: Bye 2020 Comedy Night ===
- Yang responded to some of her male critics, "They think I'm the most abominable witch in the world. Everything they've suffered is because I said, 'How can you look so average and be so confident?'"
- "Men are unhappy even for being labelled as 'average'—what exactly do they want?" she asked, joking that men are too hard to please.
- She talked about a male colleague commenting on her new jokes to be "challenging men's bottom line". "I was so shocked, men have bottom lines?", Yang sarcastically asked.
- "A joke can only get laughs for one reason," she concluded, "because it resonates."

== Controversy ==
=== Criticism ===
Though attracting a huge following, Yang faced backlash from male critics, setting off a fierce online debate. Labelling her with "sexism" and "man-hating", male netizens have condemned Yang for provoking "antagonism between men and women" and inciting "hatred towards men". Yang's social media pages were flooded with insults, with many accusing her of vilifying men just to "attract eyeballs". An attempt to censor her followed. In December 2020, a group claiming to defend men's rights initiated an online campaign of reporting Yang to China's top media regulator, National Radio and Television Administration, for promoting "sexist" speech, alleging her of "repeatedly insulting all men" and "creating gender opposition". The post was later deleted amid criticism and the authorities did not respond to requests for comment. Meanwhile, Yang herself has refrained from commenting on the criticism against her, apart from writing on social media that stand-up comedy has become an increasingly difficult profession.

Though Yang has not publicly announced herself as a feminist, online critics have characterised Yang and her supporters as unreasonable feminists who demand privilege. Chu Yin, a law professor at the Beijing-based University of International Relations, identified Yang's supporters as internet feminists who are "the most emotional and least tolerable group of people". Chu, as one of Yang's most prominent detractors, first aired his complaints in September 2020 on Douyin, the Chinese version of TikTok. "How much above average does a man need to be in order to be confident in front of you?", Chu said, "A man may be average, but you are likely ugly without makeup." Claiming that Yang is only using her feminist persona for monetary gain, Chu published a lengthy post on Weibo, warning that Yang's "gender politics from the West" threatens "the unity of the working class" and will lead to "hatred against straight men".

Chizi, a male comedian with a penchant for vulgar jokes about women, also rose to fame on Rock & Roast. He posted on Weibo that the show's ideal performance should be "definitely not like Yang Li" and that what she was doing was "not comedy".

=== Support ===
Meanwhile, supporters have defended Yang, referring to the male critics as oversensitive and lacking a sense of humour. They suggest that the backlash has proven Yang's point in many of her jokes—the female perspective is often silenced by those who believe men are more superior than women, and Yang's performance identifies such heterosexual males who enjoy privilege in a male-oriented society in China. Observers point out that the defensive tone of her detractors is revealing—the fact that Yang's remarks triggered such a strong reaction is reason enough for more jokes of that nature.

Chinese-American comedian Joe Wong applauds Yang's performance on Weibo. "Her material is about the blind spots of men, so perhaps that's why some do not find humour in it", he wrote, "One benefit of comedy is that it grants an opportunity for underprivileged people to joke about and criticise those who are more privileged. No one protested in the past when comedians made fun of disabled people, women and marginalised communities."

=== Yang's response ===
Yang disclosed that she was initially astounded by the backlash her joke received, which included violent threats. "It wasn't until I saw the comments that I realised some people reacted aggressively towards my performance", Yang said in an interview, "It kind of scared me. I felt like I was dragged into a war I didn't start." She added: "I'm only trying to be funny. In fact, in the same performance, I also ridiculed women for being emotional, but I didn't receive any hateful comments or threats from female netizens. Women have most likely become used to their stereotypical weakness being made fun of, while men have heard so few jokes like this before."

=== Media commentary ===
Yang's jokes have prompted fresh debate in China, where both the feminist movement and stand-up comedy are relatively new cultural phenomena. The controversy over her remarks has highlighted the difficult path of feminism in China. Yang has emerged as a leading feminist voice, and her jokes are an example of recent efforts by Chinese women to counter the country's deeply rooted misogyny.

=== Intel Marketing Campaign ===
On March 18, 2021, Intel released a Weibo ad where Yang said, "Intel has a taste [for laptops] that is higher than my taste for men" (originally “英特尔的眼光太高了，比我挑对象的眼光都高.”) This ad resulted in complaints of allegedly insulting men. Some social media users vowed to boycott Intel. In response, Intel deleted the ad from Weibo and abruptly removed Yang as an Intel brand ambassador.

=== JD.com Singles' Day Campaign ===
Yang faced significant backlash in November 2024 after being a part of a JD.com marketing effort for Singles' Day. JD.com was accused of supporting "a male-hating witch" and promoting "gender antagonism." This resulted in boycotts of JD.com, threats of violence against Yang, and a significant number of account cancellations. In response, JD.com apologized and immediately suspended the campaign.

== See also ==
- Feminism in China
- Gender inequality in China
- Women in China
- Chinese patriarchy
