= New Chinese Northeast Writers Group =

Chinese literary movement

The New Chinese Northeast Writers Group (simplified Chinese: 新中国东北作家群; traditional Chinese: 新中國東北作家群) is a contemporary Chinese literary movement. The group includes authors such as Shuang Xuetao, Ban Yu, Zheng Zhi, and Yang Zhihan. Unlike the Chinese Northeast Writers Group, who focused on the anti-Japanese resistance, the new group primarily writes from the perspective of the "son generation". Their works often depict the experiences of their parents during the mass layoffs of workers that occurred in Northeast China in the 1990s.

== Origin and naming ==
The concept of the "New Northeast Writers" was first proposed in 2011 by Lin Yan, a teacher at Bohai University and the current vice-chairman of the Liaoning Federation of Literary and Art Circles. Writing in the "Bohai Forum" section of the Journal of Bohai University, he introduced the term "Liaoning's 'New Northeast Writers'", framing it as a literary successor to the "Northeast Writers" of the 1930s. At this time, the name primarily referred to a regional literary movement, encompassing talented writers from across the entire Northeast with the goal of creating outstanding regional literature.

In the 2010s, works by writers like Shuang Xuetao, Ban Yu, and Zheng Zhi began to gain recognition through literary competitions and online platforms before being acknowledged by established literary magazines. Shuang Xuetao's literary career, for instance, began in 2011 when he won the first prize in the "Chinese-language Film Novel Award" hosted by the China Times, followed by the 14th Taipei Literary Award in 2012.

The publication of Shuang Xuetao's novella Moses on the Plain in the second issue of the literary magazine Harvest in 2015 is often considered the group's breakthrough onto the national literary stage. In the years that followed, works by Zheng Zhi and Ban Yu were also published in Harvest. In 2019, Huang Ping, a professor in the Chinese Department at East China Normal University, published an article in Wenyi Bao titled "Writing 'Inward' and Writing 'Outward'", which formally grouped Shuang Xuetao, Ban Yu, and Zheng Zhi under the banner of the New Northeast Writers. Huang Ping revisited the topic in a 2020 article in the Journal of Jilin University Social Sciences, where he discussed the group's emergence, themes, style, and future prospects. In 2021, Huang Ping published the book Leaving the Northeast: From Northeast Writing to the Era of Algorithm-Driven Literature, offering a systematic analysis of the New Northeast Writers.

== Themes and marrative style ==
In the latter half of the 20th century, China's Northeast was a crucial industrial heartland. Following the reform and opening-up policy, China underwent state-owned enterprise reforms, leading to a massive wave of layoffs in the 1990s. This period is a defining event in the region's history, yet it has been sparsely represented in literature. The New Northeast Writers, who were children at the time, have chosen to narrate these events from the perspective of the "son generation". Their works depict the hardships faced by their parents, who, despite their unemployment and financial struggles, maintain an unyielding sense of dignity. This focus has led some critics to consider their writing a revival of Northeast worker culture.

== Key authors ==
- Shuang Xuetao( 双雪涛): Moses on the Plain (平原上的摩西), The Deaf and Mute Era (聋哑时代), The Aviator (飞行家)
- Ban Yu(班宇): Winter Swimming (冬泳), A Leisurely Stroll (逍遥游)
- Zheng Zhi(郑执): Swallow (生吞)
- Yang Zhihan(杨知寒): A Solid Mass of Ice (一团坚冰)
