= Luo Changping =

Chinese entrepreneur and former journalist (born 1980)

- 罗昌平
- Born: 27 December 1980 (age 45); Lianyuan, Hunan, China
- Education: Bachelor's degree at China Europe International Business School
- Occupations: Journalist, entrepreneur
- Years active: 2012–present
- Awards: Transparency International Integrity Award (2013)

Luo Changping (simplified Chinese: 罗昌平; traditional Chinese: 羅昌平, born 27 December 1980) is a Chinese entrepreneur and former journalist. He is the co-founder of the third-party monitoring platform "Okoer", as well as the Chairman of Tianjiao Legal Group. In November 2013, Luo became the first recipient of the Transparency International Integrity Award with Chinese citizenship.

Luo used to be the chief reporter of China Business Herald, editor-in-chief of the In-depth Reporting Department of The Beijing News, as well as the deputy editor-in-chief of Caijing magazine. Proficient in the field of Political Economy and Finance, he has published multiple investigative reports on official corruption.

== Early life ==
Luo Changping was born in Lianyuan within the province of Hunan. After graduating from junior high school, he enrolled in a secondary vocational school in the provincial capital Changsha, where he studied Hydraulic Engineering.

While in school, Luo served as the editor-in-chief of the school newspaper and the head of the school radio station. Following graduation, he worked in a magazine focused on electric power industry at the age of 20.

== Career ==
In 2001, Luo quit his job and moved to Beijing to look for a career in journalism. He was hired by China Business Herald and was later promoted to chief reporter. In March 2004, he joined The Beijing News and was promoted to the chief editor of the In-depth Reporting Department in December 2005. Due to his coverage of the CCP disciplinary procedure Shuanggui, he was pressured to resign from The Beijing News in May 2006.

Luo joined Caijing magazine as a reporter, and was promoted to the deputy editor-in-chief in December 2009. He focused on independent news investigations in the fields of political economy and finance, and has published investigative reporting on a series of corruption cases, such as the Shanghai Pension Scandal and Liu Zhihua Bribery Case.

In 2011, Luo was one of the recipient of the honor "Young Leaders of China" (Chinese: 中国青年领袖). In 2012, He entered the Beijing Class 1 of China Europe International Business School to study for Executive Master of Business Administration, and graduated in 2014.

On 6 December 2012, Luo Changping exposed a series of misconducts done by Liu Tienan, the then deputy director of the National Development and Reform Commission and director of the National Energy Administration, on his Sina Blog and verified microblog. Among the allegations were falsifying academic records and corruption.

== Arrest ==
On 6 October 2021, a week after the release of the film The Battle at Lake Changjin, Luo made the following comment on his Sina Blog concerning the Battle of Chosin Reservoir featured in the film:

Half a century later, our countrymen rarely reflect on the justifiability of the war, just like how the soldiers in the Sand Sculpture Company didn't doubt the 'wise decision-making' at the top.

"Sand Sculpture Company" was a portmanteau of "Ice Sculpture Company", a reference to the Chinese units whose soldiers froze to death during the battle; and "Sand Sculpture", a Chinese internet slang for idiot. The comment received wide condemnation from mainland Chinese media. On the following day, Luo was taken into custody by the police. On 8 October, his's Sina Blog account was suspended. On the same day, Sanya Ji'an Police Bureau summoned Luo for investigation into his "illegal remarks" suspected of "insulting heroes and martyrs". In addition, the People's Procuratorate of the Suburbs of Sanya announced to file a civil public interest lawsuit against Luo.
