= Li Xueqin (comedian) =

Chinese actress and comedian

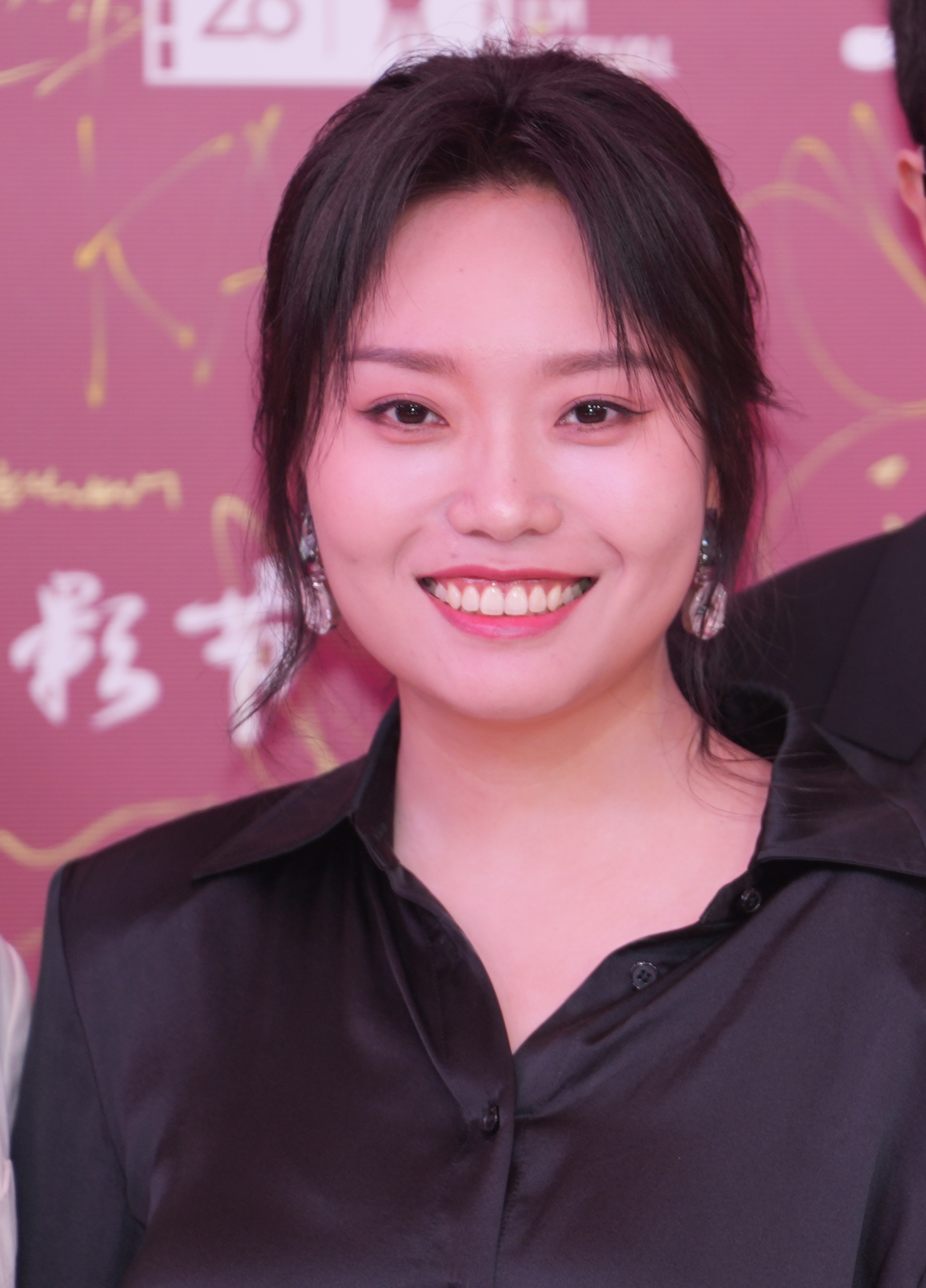
- Li at 2026 Shanghai International Film Festival
- Born: Li Xueyang; July 1, 1995 (age 31); Tieling, Liaoning
- Education: Peking University
- Occupations: Stand-up comedian; Host; Actress
- Years active: 2018–present
- Notable work: Rock & Roast
- Height: 167 cm (5 ft 6 in)

Chinese name
- Simplified Chinese: 李雪琴
Transcriptions
Standard Mandarin
- Hanyu Pinyin: Lǐ Xuěqín

Li Xueyang (Chinese: 李雪阳, born July 1, 1995), known professionally as Li Xueqin (李雪琴), is a Chinese stand-up comedian and actress. In 2020, she gained nationwide acclaim for her debut on the comedy competition Rock & Roast season 3.

== Early life and education ==
Li Xueqin is a native of Tieling, Liaoning. Her parents divorced when she was in junior high school. She attended the School of Journalism and Communication at Peking University, where she first showed signs of depression. After graduating, she enrolled in a master's program at New York University; but the difficult transition worsened her condition. She left her studies and returned to China, worked in various jobs before starting her own business and creating videos on Douyin and Weibo, launching her comedy career.

== Career ==
In 2018, Li Xueqin gained internet fame with short videos humorously introducing local landmarks to Kris Wu. After Wu responded, she went viral and quickly became the most-searched topic on Weibo. Other notable figures Guo Ailun and Robin Li also engaged.

In 2019, Li declined an invitation to perform on Rock & Roast due to inexperience but later accepted amid COVID-19 pandemic uncertainties. She prepared by self-learning, mainly through Greg Dean's 'Step by Step to Stand-Up Comedy'. She placed fifth and earned recognition among a group of female comedians. After stand-up success, Li expanded into other comedy forms, becoming one of the few female voices in the male-dominated Dongbei renaissance.

After gaining widespread attention, Li participated in various programs and activities. She performed the sketch 'Rehearsal' alongside other artists at the CCTV Lantern Festival Gala.

== Influence ==
=== Media image ===
Li was praised for her sharp wit and relatable storytelling that connected with ordinary Chinese people. Her jokes on farming and city life sharply captured young Chinese caught between rural roots and urban reality. She highlighted the struggles of beipiao, a term describing youth who leave their hometowns to work in Beijing, critiquing the city's indifference and challenging the value of big-city dreams. In 2025, she lost weight with intermittent fasting, emerged as a fashion icon, and broadened her acting range to diverse roles.

=== Ligitation ===
In June 2025, Li Xueqin was accused by former associate Xie Tianfei of financial misconduct involving her dissolved company, including profit withholding, irregular transactions, and undisclosed asset transfers. Li's studio confirmed lawful liquidation, denied misconduct, and reserved the right to take legal action against Xie.

== Filmography ==
=== TV and web series ===
| Year | English title | Role | Notes | Ref. |
|---|---|---|---|---|
| 2022 | Hello My Love | Li Xuqin | Supporting Role | |
| 2023 | Sticky Club | Xue Qin | Main Role | |
| 2023 | There Will Be Ample Time | Wu Yun | Main Role | |
| 2025 | The Prisoner Of Beauty | Xiao Tao | Supporting Role | |
| 2025 | Sarcastic Family | Li Lili | Main Role | |

=== Film ===
| Year | English title | Role | Notes | Ref. |
|---|---|---|---|---|
| 2023 | Post Truth | Wei Ruyi | Main Role | |
| 2024 | YOLO | Lili | Supporting Role | |
| 2024 | Inside Out 2 | Sadness | Dubbing | |
| 2024 | The Hutong Cowboy | Xiaoqin | Supporting Role | |
| 2026 | The Aviator | | Main Role | |

=== Variety shows ===
| Year | English Title | Ref. |
|---|---|---|
| 2020 | Rock & Roast Season 3 | |
| 2020 | Field of Hope | |
| 2021 | Happy Comedian | |
| 2021 | 50km Taohuawu | |
| 2021 | Heart Signal Season 4 | |
| 2021 | The Coming One | |
| 2021 | Mao Xue Woof | |
| 2022 | On Air Sitcom | |
| 2022 | 50km Taohuawu Season 2 | |
| 2022 | Hello Saturday | |
| 2022 | We Are The Champions | |
| 2023 | SHErlock | |
| 2023 | 50km Taohuawu Season 3 | |
| 2024 | 50km Taohuawu Season 4 | |
| 2024 | SHErlock Season 2 | |
| 2025 | Mao Xue Woof | |

== See also ==
- Stand-up Comedy in China
- Women in comedy
