= Omnipotent Youth Society (album) =

Studio album by Omnipotent Youth Society
- Released: November 12, 2010
- Genre: Indie rock; alternative rock
- Length: 49:01
- Language: Mandarin
- Label: Self-released
- Producer: Omnipotent Youth Society

Omnipotent Youth Society chronology
Omnipotent Youth Society (2010)	Wuyundiandangji (2013)

Omnipotent Youth Society (Chinese: 万能青年旅店; pinyin: Wànnéng Qīngnián Lǚdiàn) is the debut studio album by Chinese indie rock band Omnipotent Youth Society. The album, released independently on November 12, 2010, was the first studio album of the band since its establishment in Shijiazhuang, Hebei, in 1996. After many personnel changes, the members of the band were Dong Yaqian, Shi Li, Ji Geng, and Yang Yougeng by the time Omnipotent Youth Society was released.

The album features a variety of genres, ranging from blues-style solos to folk-rock, progressive rock, alternative rock, hard rock, blues-rock, and elements related to free jazz. The lyrics deal with social issues, politics, depression, and the idiosyncrasies of the younger generation. Some brass instruments are used, such as saxophone, trumpet, and cello. The trumpet played by Shi Li takes a large part in the album.

Since its release, the album has received positive reviews from some music critics and mainstream media in Mainland China and Taiwan. The album helped OYS win the Best Band Award on the 11th Chinese Music Media Awards and seven nominations of other awards. The success of the album also popularized OYS in Taiwan and influenced the local music industry.

== Recording ==
"Actually (we) weren't particularly interested in studying rock music at that time. All we did was practice day and night. I even avoided playing rock n' roll and felt like playing jazz and blues more, like John Scofield."

— Dong describing his time spent in Qinhuangdao in an interview by Southern People Weekly, 2000.

Influenced by American rock band Blind Melon, The Nico was formed in Shijiazhuang, Hebei, China, in 1996. The band was named after the daughter of Shannon Hoon, the lead vocalist of Blind Melon at the time. The initial members were Ji Geng (Bass), Zhang Peidong (Drum), and Dong Yaqian (Guitar and lead vocalist). They considered writing lyrics in English at first. In 2000, Dong Yaqian suffered serious depression after his childhood friend and classmate, Ji Geng, went to the south of China for further study. After a month of accompanying Ji Geng's study, Dong Yaqian went to Qinhuangdao to recuperate for a while. During this period, Dong was practising the guitar all the time and composed the melody of "Qinhuangdao". Cui Xudong, the guitarist, was thereafter added to the band in 2000. In 2001, Zhang Peidong, the drummer, left the band to pursue further studies in Japan. After the new drummer, Xun Liang, joined the band, The Nico officially changed its name into Omnipotent Youth Society under the suggestion of Ji at the end of the same year. Ji wrote the lyrics of The Less Than Omnipotent Comedy in 2003, and it was the first successful try on lyrics by OYS. In 2004, Xun and Cui left the band, and Ji went to Hebei Normal University for postgraduate studies in English. By the year 2006, Dong returned to Shijiazhuang, and Ji returned to OYS. They recruited Feng Yuliang (Saxist), Lu Zhi (Cellist), and Shi Li (Trumpeter). Since 2007, OYS started performing some of the songs in OYS (album) in live houses like Mao Live.

Before the official recording of OYS started, some demos recorded by band members in 2003-2004 had already been spread widely on the internet. The recording work officially started in 2008. Band members were reluctant to go to studios for the work, so they planned to finish the job at home, which brought lots of problems. In the beginning, OYS only had a U-87 microphone and purchased Fender deluxe reverbs, but the results were not satisfying. They later realized it was essential to use a microphone preamplifier and then spent 16,000 RMB to get one. With the new equipment, OYS finally finished the recording of the electric guitar part of "Ten Thousand Hippies" and "Qinhuangdao". Then the band found that their room was too small to guarantee the quality of drum track recording, so they gave up the idea of recording all the songs and turned to rearranging current works. Dong got to know about multitrack recorders later and asked friends to buy two of them on French websites. By the time OYS went to Beijing, they obtained some pre-owned acoustic boards to reform their recording room. They finished the recording of flute, acoustic guitar, and jazz drum tracks there. Then they returned to Shijiazhuang, and used multi-track recorders to finish recording tracks of the trumpet, vocal, and bass. The recording was finally finished after the audio mix.

== Songs and themes ==
If we replace the "pubs" with "squares", the message is more than clear. "They did drive the tanks to the streets" at that time.

— Ji's explanation of the lyrics of "All the Pubs on This Planet"

The song is about a family of three, about the tragedy happening in daily life. It's about an indifferent father, a desperate mother, and an untamed son. There were a lot of families like this in my neighbourhood. It's not a normal process of growing up (for a child); rather, it's a process of nibbling his passion and self-esteem.

— Ji's explanation of the lyrics of "Kill that Man from Shijiazhuang"

While Dong wrote the songs' music, Ji wrote their lyrics. And the other members were responsible for the arrangement of parts of their own instruments.

Performance of trumpet and other instruments at the ending of "Big Rock Smashing on the Chest". Trumpet is featured extensively.

Guitar noise and free-jazz in "All the Pubs on This Planet"（A 30-second excerpt）

The first track, "The Hall of Dog's Urine", and the fifth song, "Summer Record of Foreign birds", are purely instrumental.

The second track, "The Non-Omnipotent Comedy", consists of only eight lines of lyrics throughout the song, and has a coda that accounts for the majority of the song's length. OYS released different versions of this song since, including an unplugged version, a pure playing version, and a trumpet-free version, which represent the traces of the band's experiment on music for almost six years.

The sixth track, "Qinhuangdao", was composed by Dong when he was recuperating from depression in Qinhuangdao. Ji Geng's lyrics described Dong's depression at that time.

The seventh track, "One Hundred Thousand Hippies", describes the characteristics of the younger generation and Dong, and sets Dong as the main character of the song. For example, the lyrics "like to have a dog" and "Mr Dong, who dreamt a long dream " show the behaviours and characteristics that Dong had. The lyrics of this song not only have the harmonious nature of parallelism, but also interlaces long and short sentences.

The eighth track, "All the Pubs on This Planet", is seen by some to have political implications, with lyrics such as "...singing only the love songs but seeing no tanks" and "All the pubs on This Planet..." which are believed to refer to the 1989 Tiananmen Square protests. Ji Geng, the songwriter, admitted that he replaced the word "square" with "pub" to make "cruel" things "relatively romantic". The arrangements of this song feature many instruments: starting with a blues slide, proceeding with a solo of early-style-blues, and ending with guitar noise and free jazz.

The ninth track, "Kill the One from Shijiazhuang," has sparked a lot of speculation over its possible theme, either as a poignant elegy to the Chinese working-class who were deprived of their most important source of livelihood and pride in the traumatic era of Xiagang (下岗), or an allusion to the Shijiazhuang bombings which sent shock waves across the Chinese society. However, Ji explained that the song was to describe a particular kind of family during that period.

== Release ==
In 2006, the mini-album, "What are the Junkies up to?", was uploaded to the Internet, containing demos of "Kill the One from Shijiazhuang", " The Non-omnipotent Comedy", and "Qinhuangdao", which were recorded by OYS between 2003 and 2004. Shi confirmed that a friend of the band uploaded it without the band's knowledge. In 2007, a demo of the album, "The Non-omnipotent Comedy (unplugged)", was released on Pocket Music Picks 01.

Before the release of the official album, the band released several bootleg recordings while touring, including live versions of the album's tracks, such as " Omnipotent Youth Society @mao (2007)”, "Live at MAO Beijing 2008" (2008), "Live at MAO Beijing 2009" (2009), and "Live at SOHO 2010" (2010). These bootleg albums included live versions of "Kill the One from Shijiazhuang", " The Non-omnipotent Comedy", "Qinhuangdao," "One Hundred Thousand Hippies," and "Big Block Smashing on the Chest", with some of the band's unpublished songs.

The CD version of the official album was originally released on November 12, 2010, by the band themselves, and the signing was hosted at the Yuyintang bar. This album has been issued three times by now. The first two editions are basically the same, and the third releases are printed on the back "third edition | March 2016". In July 2011, the band released a CD version of the album in Taiwan independently.

== Influence ==
Li Guangping, from the Chinese Music Media Awards committee, spoke highly of OYS: "(OYS) is the best dark horse in the end of this year. (OYS) features folk rock and unfamiliar melodies, leaping thoughts like poetry, dense, subtle, and twisting metaphors, young and lazy singing like moans. All these features let OYS stand out among a mass of rock bands which are struggling to survive. I love their profound and imagistic thinking, such as 'lived like this for 30 years; until the building collapsed!' it's so graphic and shocking."

Ma Shifang, a Taiwan music critic also commented positively: "In just one night, you have conquered all Chinese music critics and become the saviors of Chinese rock music."

"The band has miraculously presented a united front of aesthetic standards of rock music," said Zhang Xiaozhou, another music critic.

Ifeng.com, Hebei: "In the context that Chinese rock music is gradually losing a say internationally, Wan Qing (an abbreviation of OYS) managed to restore people's faith in Chinese rock and roll, bringing back the initial feeling of being touched that rock fans once had.
After its release, the album went popular with listeners and musicians from Taiwan, and influenced the local music industry to some extent. Many well-known singers have covered songs of OYS. Zhang Xuan covered "Qinhuangdao" and "Kill the One from Shijiazhuang, Hebe Tien covered "One Hundred Thousand Hippies", and the indie rock band Lao Wang covered "Qinhuangdao", too. The Taiwan band No Party for Caodong was referred to by some media as "Taipei OYS".

The album won the Best Band Award at the 11th Chinese Music Media Awards and seven other nominations.

== Track listing ==
No.	Title	Lyrics	Music	Length
1.	"Palace of Dog Piss (intro)" (狗尿馆(intro))		Dong Yaqian	1:56
2.	"The Less Than Omnipotent Comedy" (不万能的喜剧)	Ji Geng	Dong Yaqian	5:34
3.	"A Heart Wrenching Joke and a Long Daydream" (揪心的玩笑与漫长的白日梦)	Ji Geng	Dong Yaqian	5:35
4.	"The Boulder That Crushes the Chest" (大石碎胸口)	Ji Geng	Dong Yaqian	7:03
5.	"Log of Sea Ghosts' Aestical Travels" (洋鸟消夏录)		Dong Yaqian	1:10
6.	"Qinhuangdao" (秦皇岛)	Ji Geng	Dong Yaqian	8:05
7.	"One Hundred Thousand Hippies" (十萬嬉皮)	Ji Geng	Dong Yaqian	4:45
8.	"Throughout the Drinkeries of This Planet" (在这颗行星所有的酒馆)	Ji Geng	Dong Yaqian	9:09
9.	"Kill the One from Shijiazhuang" (杀死那个石家庄人)	Ji Geng	Dong Yaqian	5:44
Total length:				49:01
