= Omnipotent Youth Society =

Chinese alternative rock band

Omnipotent Youth Society 万能青年旅店
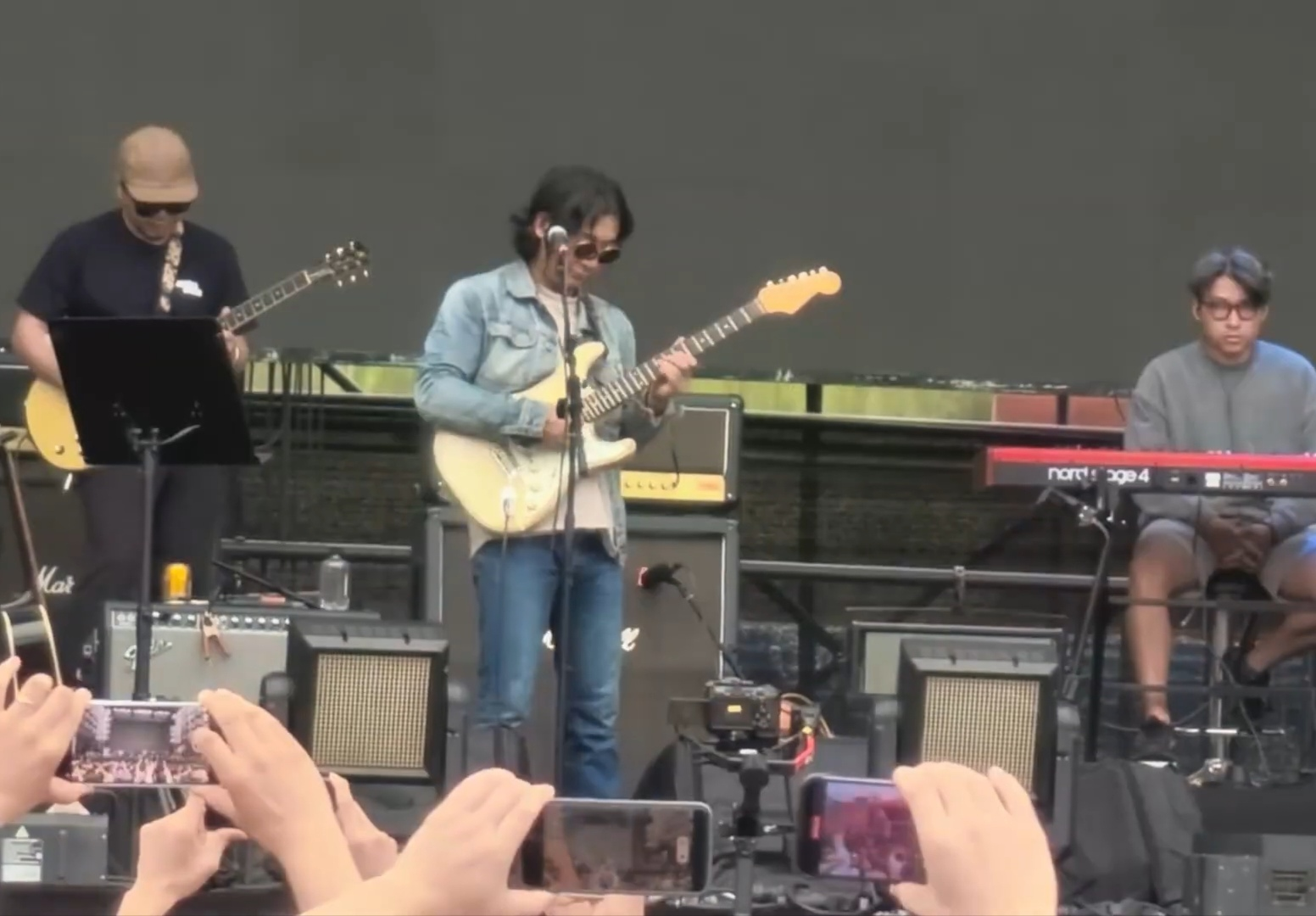
- Omnipotent Youth Society in Nandan on 23 May 2025

Background information
- Origin: Shijiazhuang, Hebei, China
- Genres: Indie rock; alternative rock; art rock; progressive rock
- Years active: 1996–present
- Members: Dong Yaqian; Ji Geng; Feng Jiang; Shi Li
- Past members: Yang Yougeng; Li Zenghui; Xun Liang; Cui Xudong

Omnipotent Youth Society (Chinese: 万能青年旅店; pinyin: Wànnéng Qīngnián Lǚdiàn), with its acronym OYS (Chinese: 万青; pinyin: Wànqīng), is a Chinese rock band formed in Shijiazhuang, Hebei in 1996. They have been noted as a keystone of the Chinese rock scene.

Currently it has four core members: Dong Yaqian (also known as Er Qian) on lead vocals and guitar, Ji Geng on bass, Feng Jiang on drums, and Shi Li on trumpet. Most of their songs feature melodies by Dong and lyrics by Ji.

== Career ==
OYS started performing in Shijiazhuang in 1996. The band was first named "The Nico", after the daughter of Shannon Hoon, the late singer of Blind Melon. The name was changed to Omnipotent Youth Society in 2002. The name is an ironic reference to the idealism of the members' parents' generation. In 2018, Ji commented: "we stopped feeling that [sense of omnipotence] a long time ago.”

OYS released their first single "Not Omnipotent Comedy" in 2006.

On February 2, 2009, the band released their first EP "Universal Ostrich Domestication Guide".

OYS's self-titled first album Omnipotent Youth Society was released in 2010, fourteen years after the band's founding, and was voted Top Record of 2010 on Douban. The band won Band of the Year at that year's Chinese Music Media Awards.

In April 2011, OYS was nominated for 7 nominations including Best Rock Artist and Annual Mandarin Album at the 11th Chinese Music Media Awards for its album Omnipotent Youth Society and won the Best Band Award.

On January 12, 2013, Han Han, a famous Chinese writer, advocated for OYS by writing lyrics in calligraphy for the song "Kill the One from Shijiazhuang".

In October 2014, OYS performed in Central Park in New York City in the Modern Sky Festival by the Beijing-based organization Modern Sky. As a result, a performance economic contract was officially signed with Modern Sky Company.

In October 2015, OYS toured Taiwan.

In December 2020, the band released their sophomore album, Inside the Cable Temple. Like their first album, album was voted Top Album of 2020 on Douban. They headlined Chengdu's Genki Forest Music Festival that year. This second album, released after a decade, not only maintains an excellent artistic level, but also sets a record for the highest sales of independent music digital albums in China with a sales volume of 700000 copies. The Paper connected the band, and their newest release, with the recent revival in interest in Dongbei culture.

In 2021, the city of Shijiazhuang awarded Ji Geng a grant in recognition of his contributions to the culture of Shijiazhuang.

In 2023, won the Best Rock Band of the Year award at the 12th Midi Awards.

== Musical style and influences ==
OYS's music is noted in particular for its lyricism. In their first album, Omnipotent Youth Society, their music evokes the urban decay and hopelessness of the city of Shijiazhuang, which was once renowned as a manufacturing hub in the 1950s and 1960s, but gradually declined into irrelevance during the unemployment crisis known as Xiagang during China's transition to market economy. The album's lead single, "Kill the One from Shijiazhuang" (Chinese: 杀死那个石家庄人; pinyin: Shā Sǐ Nàgè Shíjiāzhuāng Rén), evokes the image of a stagnant, hopeless family trapped in the monotony of daily life. The band's music has been associated with the tang ping or "lying flat" movement in China, and evokes the concept of neijuan ("involution")—a skepticism towards the idea that working hard will pay off. Musically, the album is a blend of genres, including alternative rock, folk rock, progressive rock, blues rock, and free jazz.And their creative style is not limited to the above through open arrangement techniques. OYS's Inn Band not only attracts rock fans with their music, but also has thought-provoking lyrics, vibrant arrangement, and beautiful music.

OYS's second album, Inside the Cable Temple, represents a change of theme from the band's first album. The album, inspired by a train ride the band mates took through the Taihang Mountains in 2013, explores the theme of the relationship between humans and nature. The album's Chinese-language title literally translates to "Journeying Through the Forest Roads of Southwestern Hebei". The sense of compassion and reflection on the times conveyed in Inside the Cable Temple is in line with Omnipotent Youth Society. Musically, the album is more mellow than their previous release, with strong folk music and blues influences. The lyrics have themes about environmental degradation, the effects of technology on humans and the environment, and traditional Chinese mythology.

== Discography ==
=== Studio albums ===
Release date	Title
12 November 2010	Omnipotent Youth Society (万能青年旅店)
22 December 2020	Inside the Cable Temple (冀西南林路行)

=== Singles ===
- 2006 <不万能的喜剧> (Not Omnipotent Comedy)
- 2013 <乌云典当记> (The Story of the Dark Cloud Pawnshop)
- 2015 <冀西南林路行> (A Walk in the Woods of Southwestern Hebei)
- 2016 <张洲> (Zhangzhou)
