= Shanghai Rainbow Chamber Singers =

Chinese chamber choir group

The Shanghai Rainbow Chamber Singers (Chinese: 上海彩虹室内合唱团; pinyin: Shànghǎi cǎihóng shìnèi héchàngtuán) is a chamber choir group based in Shanghai, China. The group was founded in 2010 by conductor Jin Chengzhi and his classmates from the Shanghai Conservatory of Music. The choir performs a concert every six months, staging traditional-style choral works both existing and newly written. As of 2016, the group had 44 members, including both students and working personnel. In 2020, the group participated and won the reality show We Are Blazing (Chinese: 炙热的我们). In fall of 2023, the group participated in the 54th Tolosa International Choral Contest, specifically in the polyphony and folklore categories with eight works, and won second and third place respectively. The total score ranked second among all 18 participating teams. A documentary of their journey is available on YouTube with English subtitles.

== Discography ==
- (2016) Where Did You Put My House Keys, Zhang Shichao?
- (2016) So Far, the Sofa is So Far
- (2017) What I Do Is For Your Own Good
- (2021) Star River Hotel
