= Dong Bao Shi =

Chinese rapper

Dong Baoshi, stage name Gem, is a Chinese rapper from Changchun City, Jilin Province, currently residing in Chengdu City, Sichuan Province. He gained popularity in 2019 with his song "Wild Wolf Disco".

== Biography ==
On July 20, 1986, Dong Baoshi was born in Changchun City, Jilin Province, China. During high school, he formed a rap group called "Chan" with his classmate Gao Yuran (Lianhua). While studying at university in Xi'an, he teamed up with Mai and Captain Yenan from the Red Flower Club to form the rap group X.A.E.R (Xi'an Rap Elite Regiment).

In 2005, "Chan" joined forces with "Diamond Park" by Huan and Noodle, and "Light Dance" by Fly in Dog to create the rap group "Us Tribe". In 2007, they won the first "Sword and Tongue Freestyle Battle" in Changchun.

In 2008, as part of "Us Tribe", Dong Baoshi appeared on Hunan TV's variety show "Day Day Up" for a special segment on "Five City Rap Youths". After graduating from university in 2010, he returned to Changchun and founded "Us Culture", the largest rap music label in Northeast China. In 2011, they released the album "Us Returns".

Later, Dong Baoshi worked as a manager at a local mall. In 2014, after his son was born, the family moved to his wife's hometown of Chengdu, Sichuan Province. He tried various jobs like sales and driving before his wife supported him to pursue music full-time in 2017. He was also one of the 100 rappers who competed in the final of the music talent show "Rap of China".

In 2018, Dong Baoshi auditioned as a contestant for the music talent show "Rap of China" but didn't make it past the preliminary rounds. In 2019, he tried again and after performing "Wild Wolf Disco" in the revival round, he became an internet sensation. Different versions of "Wild Wolf Disco" spread widely on platforms like Douyin (TikTok).

In October, he released a new version of "Wild Wolf Disco" in collaboration with actor William Chan. On December 31, he was invited as a guest performer for the Jiangsu TV New Year's Eve concert.

In January 2020, Dong Baoshi performed for the first time on the CCTV Spring Festival Gala stage. Together with William Chan and Zhang Yixing, they performed a modified version of "Wild Wolf Disco" called "Chinese New Year Disco". He also announced that all earnings from "Wild Wolf Disco" would be donated to the families of medical workers in Wuhan affected by the COVID-19 outbreak.

== Analysis ==
Gem gave up all the fashionable ways and chose to use rap to express the role of "Old Uncle". The image he created is not only a loser in the post-industrial era, but also shows the typical humor and "cowardly" style of Northeastern people. Although he is rustic, he is very real. At the same time, as a musician, he has experienced the challenges of life and had to make compromises in order to pursue his ideals. The "Old Uncle" he created represents the people at the bottom of society who have experienced setbacks in places like Northeast China and Guangzhou.

== Personal life ==
In 2014, Gem's son was born. In 2015, because his wife was in poor health after giving birth, Gem and his family returned to his wife's hometown of Chengdu. After that, he drove an online taxi and sold faucets. He gradually adapted to life there and even learned the Chengdu dialect.
