= Northeastern University at Qinhuangdao =

Campus of Northeastern University in Qinhuangdao, Hebei, China

Coordinates: 39.9235°N 119.5558°E

- 东北大学秦皇岛分校
- Motto: 自强不息，知行合一
- Motto in English: Striving constantly for improvement Behave in conformity with truth
- Type: Public
- Established: 1987
- Colors: NEU blue
- Website: neuq.edu.cn

Chinese name
- Simplified Chinese: 东北大学秦皇岛分校
- Traditional Chinese: 東北大學秦皇島分校
Transcriptions
Standard Mandarin
- Hanyu Pinyin: Dōngběi Dàxué Qínhuángdǎo Fēnxiào

Northeastern University at Qinhuangdao (东北大学秦皇岛分校) is a branch campus of Northeastern University. The campus is located in Qinhuangdao, Hebei, China.

It has a student population of 9,932 and a staff population of 828 (548 are teachers, including 193 professors).

== History ==
- In 1976, the university was established and was named "721" University of Metallurgical Industry North Metallurgical Geology;
- In 1982, it was renamed Qinhuangdao Metallurgical Geological Staff University
- In 1987, it was merged into the Northeast Institute of Technology
- In 1993, it was renamed Northeastern University at Qinhuangdao due to the Northeastern Institute of Technology was renamed Northeastern University
- In 1996, it participated the project "Northeastern University's 211 project construction" and entered China's "211 Project”.
- In 1998, as part of Northeastern University, it came under the administration of the Ministry of Education until now.
- In 2001, it obtained independent admissions rights in China, and the right to manage e-registration and graduates was assigned to Northeastern University
- In 2005, the graduate school was established
- In 2006, it began to undertake the “985 Project” subproject of Northeastern University

== Schools ==
- Graduate School of Northeastern University, Qinhuangdao
- School of Economics
- School of Computer and Communication Engineering
- School of Management
- School of Control Engineering
- School of Foreign Studies
- School of Mathematics and Statistics
- School of Resources and Materials
- Institute of Social Science
- Sports Department

== Campus ==
The university occupies 467,120 m^{2} (5,028,000 ft^{2}) and the building area is 348,527.38 m^{2} (3,751,517.5 ft^{2}). The university focus on the undergraduate education under the guidance of small but fine-tuned development.
It owns Institute of Engineering Optimization and Smart Antennas (EOSA), Institute of Innovation and Venture Capital Ventures, Institute of Computer Applications, Institute of Internet of Things and Information Security (IITIS), Institute of New Materials, Institute of Environmental Pollution Control and Resource Recycling, Regional Economic Research Institute, Institute of Macro Management.
This university has a partnership with University of Illinois at Chicago.

== Presidents ==
S. No.	Name	Term
1.	Li Mingjun (李名俊)	26 August 1987-24 January 1991
2.	Cao Daben (曹大本)	24 January 1991-20 April 1994
3.	Li Che (李彻)	20 April 1994-30 May 1995
4.	Wang Zhenfan (王振范)	30 May 1995-12 November 1999
5.	Wang Jinkuan (汪晋宽)	12 November 1999-28 August 2015
6.	Liu Jianchang (刘建昌)	28 August 2015-present

== Notable people ==
Faculty

- Zhang Xueliang, Lin Huiyin, Liang Sicheng, Ding Lieyun

Graduate

- Liu Jiren, Shan Tianfang, Bo Yang, Guo Xiaochuan, Liu Changchun
