= China Business Herald =

Chinese newspaper

- Type: Daily newspaper
- Publisher: China Business Herald Agency
- Founded: January 1, 1985
- Language: Chinese
- Headquarters: Beijing
- OCLC number: 866043695
- Website: www.zgswcn.com

China Business Herald (Chinese: 中国商报), also known as Zhongguo Shangbao, is a national economic newspaper published in simplified Chinese in the People's Republic of China. The newspaper was inaugurated in Beijing on January 1, 1985, and its predecessor was China Commercial Newspaper (中国商业报).

China business Herald was originally sponsored by the Ministry of Commerce of China and is now sponsored by the China General Chamber of Commerce (中国商业联合会). From January 1, 1985, to 1989, the name of the newspaper was China Commercial Newspaper, after 1989, it was changed to its current name.

== English translations of the title ==
The title of Zhongguo Shangbao has many English translations, with the most common translation being China Business Herald. It is also translated as China Business Daily or China Business Newspaper or China Trade Daily or China Trade News or China Business Paper or China Commercial Times.
