= Roast! =

Chinese standup comedy show

- Genre: Stand-up Comedy
- Written by: Li Dan, Wang Jianguo, Liang Haiyuan, Cheng Lu
- Presented by: Zhang Shaogang,Wang Zijian
- Starring: Wang Leehom, Angela Zhang, Joker Xue, Lay Zhang, Jane Zhang
- Country of origin: China
- Original language: Chinese

Production
- Running time: 90 - 120 minutes
- Production company: Xiao Guo Culture、Tencent Penguin Pictures

Original release
- Network: Tencent Video
- Release: 2016 – 2021

Related
- Rock & Roast; Tonight 80's Talk Show; Stand-up Comedy and its Friends

Roast! (Chinese: 吐槽大会; pinyin: Tǔcáo Dàhuì) is a Chinese stand-up comedy show produced by Xiaoguo Culture Media Company and Tencent Pictures, featuring a roast format where celebrities engage in humorous teasing and self-deprecation. Inspired by the American Comedy Central Roast series, the program invites a main celebrity guest along with supporting guests and comedians to deliver stand-up routines poking fun at those present. The show aired exclusively on Tencent Video in Mainland China, running for five seasons from 2017 to 2021. It gained popularity for its irreverent humor and has been analyzed for its use of satirical discourse in contemporary Chinese media.

== Content and format ==
Roast! features a main celebrity guest roasted by a panel of seven or eight supporting guests, including friends, fellow celebrities, and professional comedians, in a format inspired by the American Comedy Central Roast. Each episode, lasting 90 to 120 minutes, includes stand-up segments where participants deliver humorous jabs, often incorporating self-deprecation, with the main guest given a chance to respond. The show's motto was “Roasting is a craft; laughing it off takes courage.” In early seasons, the show emphasized high-quality humor and self-mockery over mere personal attacks. Early seasons had the main guest select a “Talk King” from the roasters, while later seasons introduced pre-recorded video roasts and audience voting for the winner. Season 5 adopted a team-based competition format, with 21 guests forming teams under captains, progressing through eliminations, culminating in Da Zhangwei’s victory as champion. Produced by Xiao Guo Culture and Tencent Pictures, the show draws from earlier programs like Tonight’s 80s Stand-Up and is linked to the spin-off Rock & Roast (脱口秀大会), a stand-up competition.

== Seasons and guests ==
Roast! consists of five seasons, plus a pilot episode.

- Pilot (2016): Aired in July 2016 featuring controversial actor Zhou Jie as the main roastee, this episode was removed from the streaming platform after three days apparently due to regulatory issues.
- Season 1 (2017): Notable guests included Tang Guoqiang, cross-talk actor, former Deyunshe member Cao Yunjin (曹云金), Phoenix Legend, and Li Xiaolu.
- Season 2 (2017–2018): Featured guests like Annie Yi, Lang Lang, and Jin Xing.
- Season 3 (2018–2019): Guests included singers/actors from mainland China, Taiwan, and HongKong, eg. Wang Leehom, Angela Zhang, Yang Chaoyue, and Peking Opera performer Wang Peiyu.
- Season 4 (2019–2020): Highlights included Jin Xing as host for Episode 9, beauty influencer and live-streamer Li Jiaqi, 90's rock star Zheng Jun, and former Olympic medalist Deng Yaping.
- Season 5 (2021): Adopted a team competition format with guests like Zhang Yuqi, Qin Hao, and athletes such as Fan Zhiyi and Zhou Qi; Da Zhangwei was crowned talk king.

== Reception ==
Its debut episode in 2016 featuring scandal-plagued actor Zhou Jie garnered 10 million views in 20 hours, earning the nickname “the dirtiest show in history” for its bold humor. The show's appeal lies in its relatable topics and sharp wit, with guests like Zhou Jie winning over viewers through self-deprecating humor, such as joking about his exaggerated expressions and past controversies. On the other hand, many audience members have complained about the later seasons turning “fake,” arguing that scripted roasts serve as an almost PR event for “notorious” stars to "whitewash" their reputation. Its provocative style also sparked controversy, notably in a Season 5 episode targeting Chinese sports, which drew backlash from sports communities and state media, leading to an unreleased episode.
