= Humour =

Tendency of experiences to provoke laughter and provide amusement

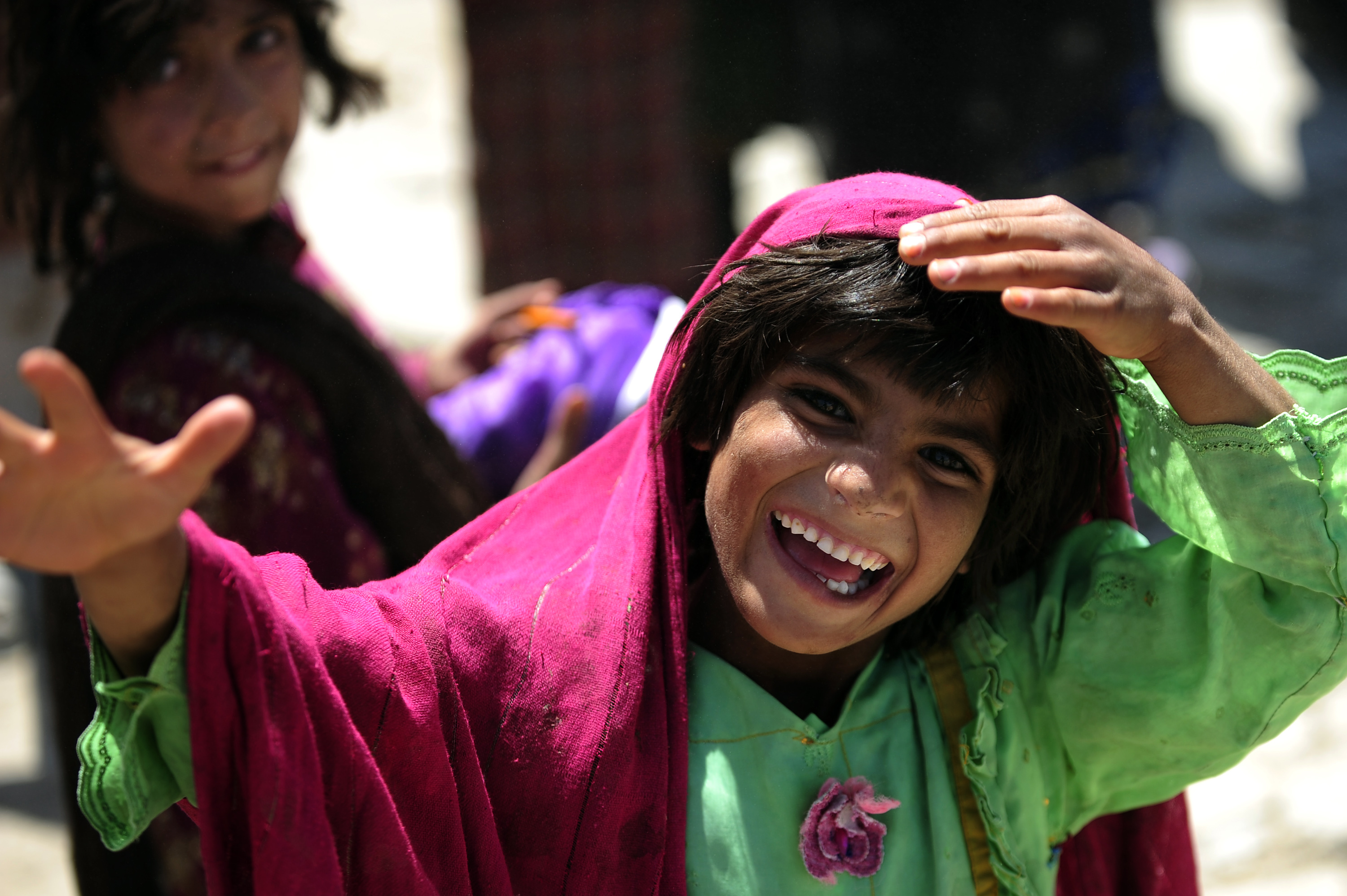
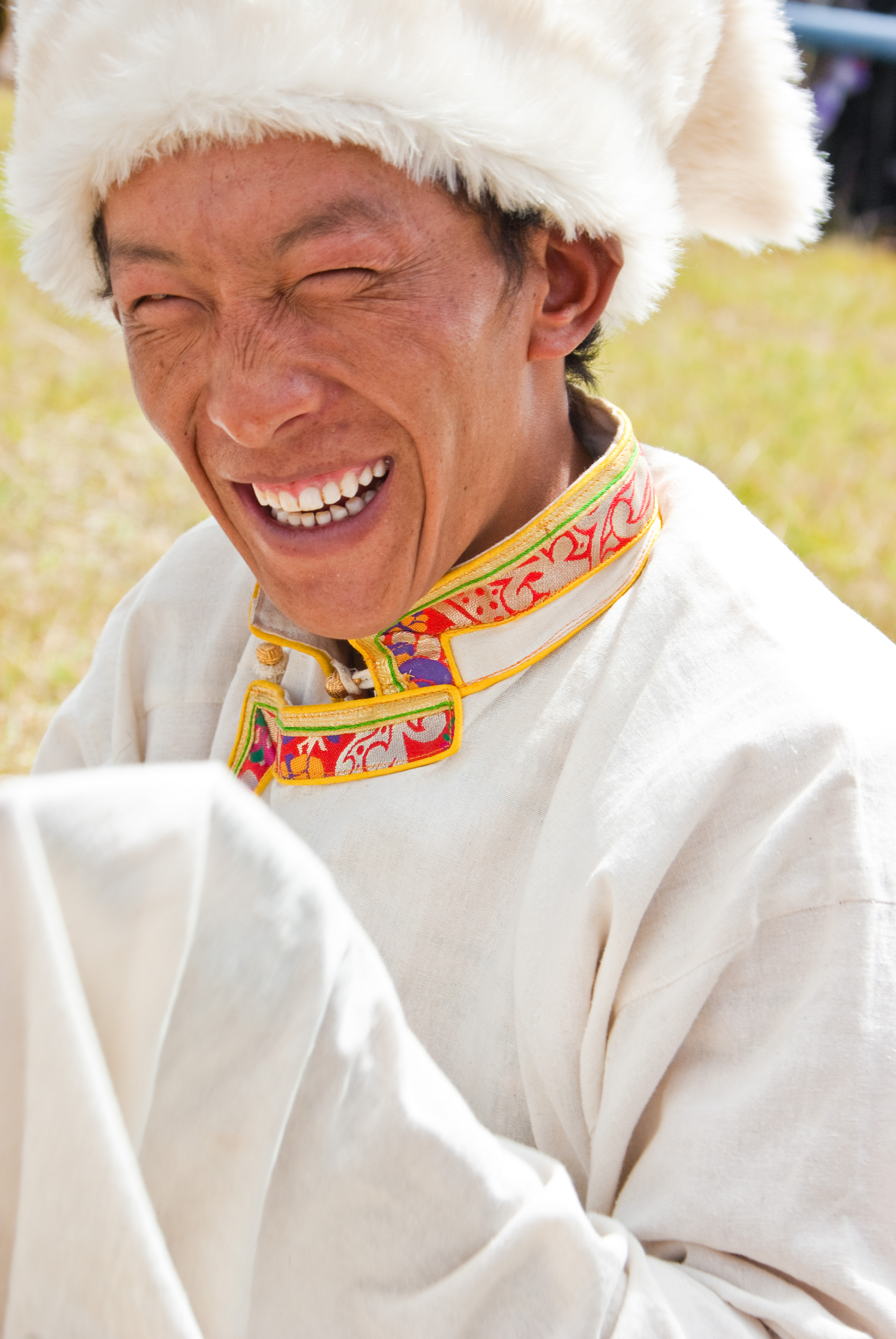
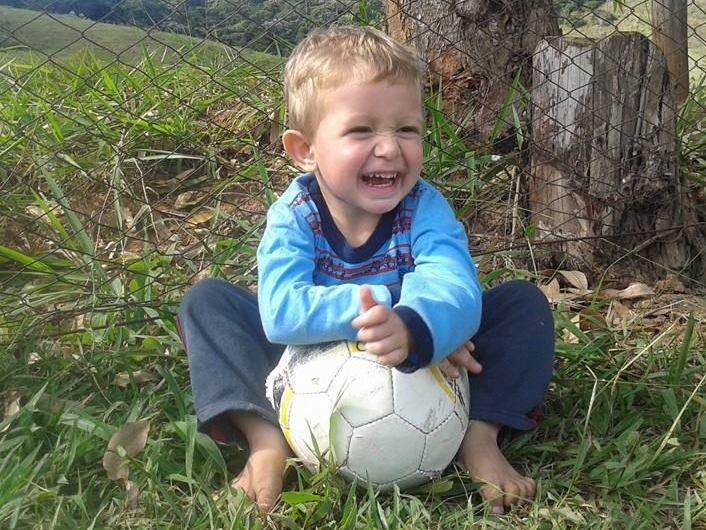
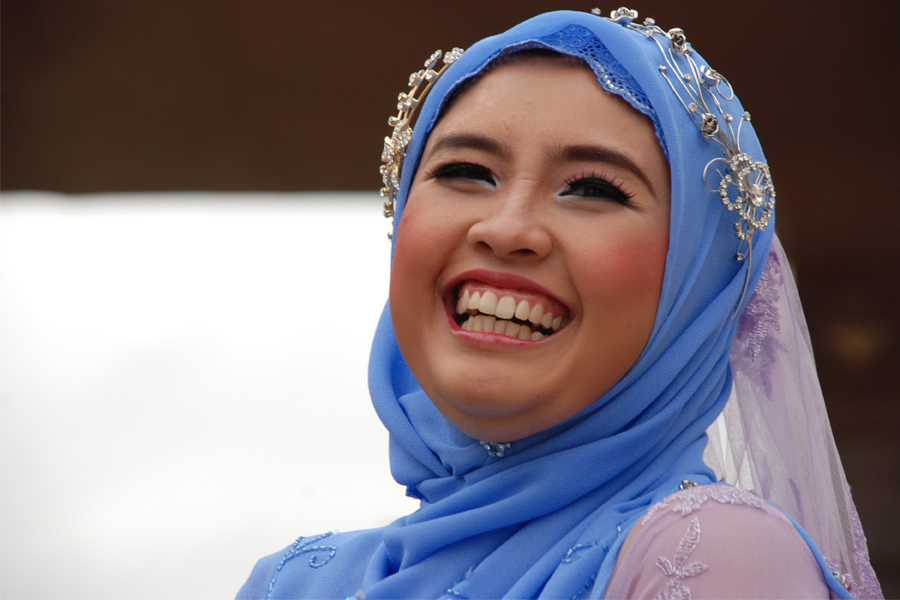
From top-left to bottom-right or from top to bottom (mobile): various people laughing from Afghanistan, Tibet, Brazil, and Malaysia

Humour (Commonwealth English) or humor (American English) is the tendency of experiences to provoke laughter and provide amusement. The term derives from the humoral medicine of the ancient Greeks, which taught that the balance of fluids in the human body, known as "humours" (Latin: humor, "body fluid"), controlled human health and emotion.

People of all ages and cultures respond to humour. Most people can experience humour—be amused, smile or laugh at something funny (such as a pun or joke)—and thus are considered to have a sense of humour. The hypothetical person lacking a sense of humour could likely find the behaviour to be inexplicable, strange, or even irrational. Though ultimately decided by subjective personal taste, the extent to which a person finds something humorous depends on a host of variables, including geographical location, culture, maturity, level of education, intelligence and context. For example, young children may favour slapstick such as Punch and Judy, puppet shows or cartoons such as Tom and Jerry or Looney Tunes, whose physical nature makes it accessible to them. By contrast, more sophisticated forms of humour such as satire require an understanding of its social meaning and context, and thus tend to appeal to a more mature audience.

== Theories ==
Many theories exist about what humour is and what social function it serves. The prevailing types of theories attempting to account for the existence of humour include psychological theories, the vast majority of which consider humour-induced behaviour to be very healthy; spiritual theories, which may, for instance, consider humour to be a "gift from God"; and theories which consider humour to be an unexplainable mystery, very much like a mystical experience.

The benign-violation theory, endorsed by Peter McGraw, attempts to explain humour's existence. The theory says "humour only occurs when something seems wrong, unsettling, or threatening, but simultaneously seems okay, acceptable or safe." Humour can be used as a method to easily engage in social interaction by taking away that awkward, uncomfortable, or uneasy feeling of social interactions.

Others believe that "the appropriate use of humour can facilitate social interactions".

== Views ==
Some claim that humour should not be explained. Author E. B. White once said, "Humor can be dissected as a frog can, but the thing dies in the process and the innards are discouraging to any but the pure scientific mind." Counter to this argument, protests against "offensive" cartoons invite the dissection of humour or its lack by aggrieved individuals and communities. This process of dissecting humour does not necessarily banish a sense of humour but directs attention towards its politics and assumed universality.

Arthur Schopenhauer lamented the misuse of humour (a German loanword from English) to mean any type of comedy. However, both humour and comic are often used when theorising about the subject. The connotations of humour as opposed to comic are said to be that of response versus stimulus. Additionally, humour was thought to include a combination of ridiculousness and wit in an individual; the paradigmatic case being Shakespeare's Sir John Falstaff. The French were slow to adopt the term humour; in French, humeur and humour are still two different words, the former referring to a person's mood or to the archaic concept of the four humours.

Humour is also observed in great apes.

== Sociological factors ==
As with any art form, the acceptance of a particular style or incidence of humour depends on sociological factors and varies from person to person. Throughout history, comedy has been used as a form of entertainment all over the world, whether in the courts of the Western kings or the villages of the Far East. Both a social etiquette and a certain intelligence can be displayed through forms of wit and sarcasm. Eighteenth-century German author Georg Lichtenberg said that "the more you know humour, the more you become demanding in fineness."

=== Ancient Greece ===
Western humour theory begins with Plato, who attributed to Socrates (as a semi-historical dialogue character) in the Philebus (p. 49b) the view that the essence of the ridiculous is an ignorance in the weak, who are thus unable to retaliate when ridiculed. Later, in Greek philosophy, Aristotle, in the Poetics (1449a, pp. 34–35), suggested that an ugliness that does not disgust is fundamental to humour.

=== India ===
In ancient Sanskrit drama, Bharata Muni's Natya Shastra defined humour (hāsyam) as one of the nine nava rasas, or principle rasas (emotional responses), which can be inspired in the audience by bhavas, the imitations of emotions that the actors perform. Each rasa was associated with a specific bhavas portrayed on stage.

=== In Arabic and Persian culture ===
Muhammad al-Baqir's Hadith about humour: "Indeed Allah loves those who are playful among people without obscenity."

The terms comedy and satire became synonymous after Aristotle's Poetics was translated into Arabic in the medieval Islamic world, where it was elaborated upon by Arabic writers and Islamic philosophers such as Abu Bischr, his pupil Al-Farabi, Persian Avicenna, and Averroes. Due to cultural differences, they disassociated comedy from Greek dramatic representation, and instead identified it with Arabic poetic themes and forms, such as hija (satirical poetry). They viewed comedy as simply the "art of reprehension" and made no reference to light and cheerful events or troublesome beginnings and happy endings associated with classical Greek comedy. After the Latin translations of the 12th century, the term comedy thus gained a new meaning in Medieval literature. In Islamic teachings, mocking others through humour is considered undesirable. In particular, showing disrespect toward sacred figures and religious symbols, such as prophets, companions of the Prophet, religious leaders, the Quran, mosques, the month of Ramadan or the shrines of saints, is regarded as a grave offense.

=== Caribbean ===
Mento star Lord Flea stated in a 1957 interview that he thought that "West Indians have the best sense of humour in the world. Even in the most solemn song, like Las Kean Fine ["Lost and Can Not Be Found"], which tells of a boiler explosion on a sugar plantation that killed several of the workers, their natural wit and humour shine though."

=== China ===
Confucianist & Neo-Confucian orthodoxy, with its emphasis on ritual and propriety, have traditionally looked down upon humour as subversive or unseemly. Humour was perceived as irony and sarcasm. The Confucian Analects itself, however, depicts the Master as fond of humorous self-deprecation, once comparing his wanderings to the existence of a homeless dog. Early Daoist philosophical texts such as Zhuangzi pointedly make fun of Confucian seriousness and make Confucius himself a slow-witted figure of fun. Joke books containing a mix of wordplay, puns, situational humour, and play with taboo subjects like sex and scatology, remained popular over the centuries. Local performing arts, storytelling, vernacular fiction, and poetry offer a wide variety of humorous styles and sensibilities.

Famous Chinese humourists include the ancient jesters Chunyu Kun and Dongfang Shuo; writers of the Ming and Qing dynasties such as Feng Menglong, Li Yu, and Wu Jingzi; and modern comic writers such as Lu Xun, Lin Yutang, Lao She, Qian Zhongshu, Wang Xiaobo, and Wang Shuo, and performers such as Ge You, Guo Degang, and Zhou Libo.

Modern Chinese humour has been heavily influenced not only by indigenous traditions, but also by foreign humour, circulated via print culture, cinema, television, and the internet. During the 1930s, Lin Yutang's phono-semantic transliteration yōumò (幽默; humour) caught on as a new term for humour, sparking a fad for humour literature, as well as impassioned debate about what type of humorous sensibility best suited China, a poor, weak country under partial foreign occupation. While some types of comedy were officially sanctioned during the rule of Mao Zedong, the Party-state's approach towards humour was generally repressive. Social liberalisation in the 1980s, commercialisation of the cultural market in the 1990s, and the advent of the internet have each—despite an invasive state-sponsored censorship apparatus—enabled new forms of humour to flourish in China in recent decades.

=== Social transformation model ===
The social transformation model of humour predicts that specific characteristics, such as physical attractiveness, interact with humour. This model involves linkages between the humorist, an audience, and the subject matter of the humour. The two transformations associated with this particular model involve the subject matter of the humour and the change in the audience's perception of the humorous person, therefore establishing a relationship between the humorous speaker and the audience. The social transformation model views humour as adaptive because it communicates the present desire to be humorous as well as future intentions of being humorous. This model is used with deliberate self-deprecating humour where one is communicating with desires to be accepted into someone else's specific social group. Although self-deprecating humour communicates weakness and fallibility in the bid to gain another's affection, it can be concluded from the model that this type of humour can increase romantic attraction towards the humorist when other variables are also favourable.

=== Physical attractiveness ===
Humour is considered attractive for males in Western cultures. In the mid-20th century, a majority of American college students reported that having a sense of humour is a crucial characteristic looked for in a romantic partner. In the late-20th century, British college students reported humour and honesty as the two most important attributes in a significant other. Humour becomes more evident and significantly more important as the level of commitment in a romantic relationship increases. Recent research suggests expressions of humour in relation to physical attractiveness are two major factors in the desire for future interaction. Self-deprecating humour has been found to increase one's desirability and physical attractiveness to others for committed relationships. Women regard physical attractiveness less highly compared to men when it came to dating, a serious relationship, and sexual intercourse. However, women rate humorous men as more desirable than nonhumorous individuals for a serious relationship or marriage, but only when these men were physically attractive.

While humorous people may be considered attractive, humorous people are also perceived by others to be less intellectual than nonhumorous people. When women were given the forced-choice design in the study, they chose funny men as potential relationship partners even though they rated them as being less honest and intelligent. Post-Hoc analysis showed no relationship between humour quality and favourable judgments.

For females, the results of a study conducted by McMaster University suggest humour can positively affect one's desirability for a specific relationship partner, but this effect is only most likely to occur when men use humour and are evaluated by women. There is inconsistent evidence whether men prefer women with a sense of humour as partners, or women preferring other women with a sense of humour as potential partners.

Outside of Western cultures, however, humour is not always valued as much in mate selection. Studies conducted in East Asia find humour ranked lower among other traits than in western cultures, especially by men evaluating women. In some studies of mate selection criteria, humour does not even make the list.

=== Culture ===
Different cultures have different typical expectations of humour so comedy shows are not always successful when transplanted into another culture. For example, a 2004 BBC News article discusses a stereotype among British comedians that Americans and Germans do not understand irony, and therefore UK sitcoms are not appreciated by them.

== Psychological well-being ==
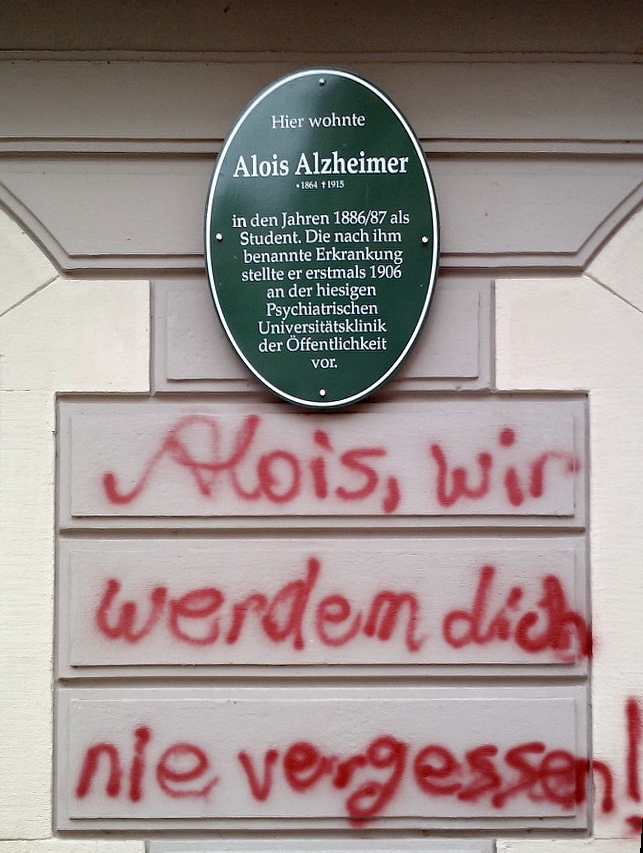
Humour can be a way of dealing with the menacing or unpleasant: Sprayed comment below a memorial plaque for Alois Alzheimer who first described the memory-damaging Alzheimer's disease – the German text means "Alois, we will never forget you!"

It is generally known that humour contributes to higher subjective wellbeing (both physical and psychological). Previous research on humour and psychological well-being show that humour is in fact a major factor in achieving, and sustaining, higher psychological wellbeing. This hypothesis is known as the general facilitative hypothesis for humour. That is, positive humour leads to positive health. Not all contemporary research, however, supports the previous assertion that humour is in fact a cause for healthier psychological wellbeing. Some of the previous researches' limitations is that they tend to use a unidimensional approach to humour because it was always inferred that humour was deemed positive. They did not consider other types of humour, or humour styles. For example, self-defeating or aggressive humour. Research has proposed 2 types of humour that each consist of 2 styles, making 4 styles in total. The two types are adaptive versus maladaptive humour. Adaptive humour consists of facilitative and self-enhancing humour, and maladaptive is self-defeating and aggressive humour. Each of these styles can have a different impact on psychological and individuals' overall subjective wellbeing.

1. Affiliative style humour. Individuals with this dimension of humour tend to use jokes as a means of affiliating relationships, amusing others, and reducing tensions.
2. Self-enhancing style humour. People who fall under this dimension of humour tend to take a humorous perspective of life. Individuals with self-enhancing humour tend to use it as a mechanism to cope with stress.
3. Aggressive humour. Racist jokes, sarcasm and disparagement of individuals for the purpose of amusement. This type of humour is used by people who do not consider the consequences of their jokes, and mainly focus on the entertainment of the listeners.
4. Self-defeating humour. People with this style of humour tend to amuse others by using self-disparaging jokes, and also tend to laugh along with others when being taunted. It is hypothesised that people attempt to use this style of humour as a means of social acceptance – which is often unsuccessful. It is also mentioned that these people may have an implicit feeling of negativity. So they use this humour as a means of hiding that inner negative feeling.

In the study on humour and psychological well-being, research has concluded that high levels of adaptive type humour (affiliative and self-enhancing) are associated with better self-esteem, positive affect, greater self-competency, as well as anxiety control and social interactions. All of which are constituents of psychological wellbeing. Additionally, adaptive humour styles may enable people to preserve their sense of wellbeing despite psychological problems. In contrast, maladaptive humour types (aggressive and self-defeating) are associated with poorer overall psychological wellbeing, with emphasis on higher levels of anxiety and depression. Therefore, humour may have detrimental effects on psychological wellbeing, only if that humour is of negative characteristics.

== Physiological effects ==
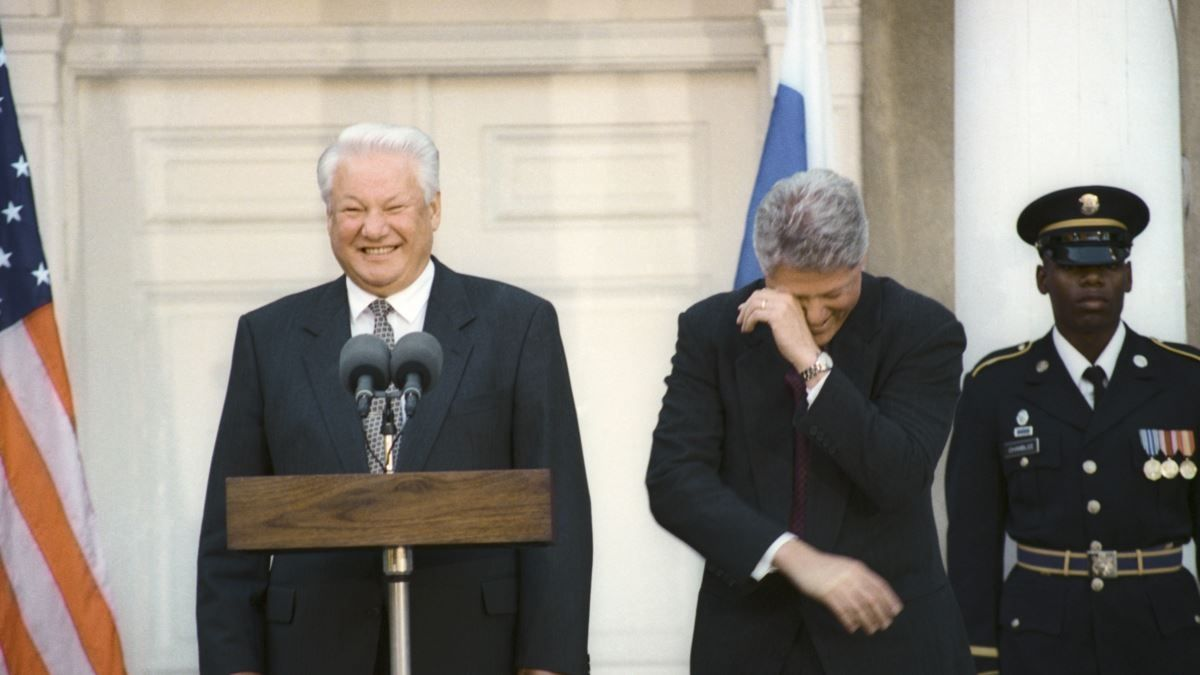
Boris Yeltsin and Bill Clinton enjoying a joke, despite their language differences

Humour is often used to make light of difficult or stressful situations and to brighten up a social atmosphere in general. It is regarded by many as an enjoyable and positive experience, so it would be reasonable to assume that it might have some positive physiological effects on the body.

A study designed to test the positive physiological effects of humour, the relationship between being exposed to humour and pain tolerance in particular, was conducted in 1994 by Karen Zwyer, Barbara Velker, and Willibald Ruch. To test the effects of humour on pain tolerance the test subjects were first exposed to a short humorous video clip and then exposed to the cold pressor test. To identify the aspects of humour which might contribute to an increase in pain tolerance the study separated its fifty-six female participants into three groups: cheerfulness, exhilaration and humour production. The subjects were further separated into two groups, high Trait-Cheerfulness and high Trait-Seriousness according to the State-Trait-Cheerfulness-Inventory. The instructions for the three groups were as follows: the cheerfulness group was told to get excited about the movie without laughing or smiling, the exhilaration group was told to laugh and smile excessively, exaggerating their natural reactions, and the humour production group was told to make humorous comments about the video clip as they watched. To ensure that the participants actually found the movie humorous and that it produced the desired effects the participants took a survey on the topic which resulted in a mean score of 3.64 out of 5. The results of the Cold Press Test showed that the participants in all three groups experienced a higher pain threshold and a higher pain tolerance than previous to the film. The results did not show a significant difference between the three groups.

There are also potential relationships between humour and having a healthy immune system. SIgA is a type of antibody that protects the body from infections. In a method similar to the previous experiment, the participants were shown a short humorous video clip and then tested for the effects. The participants showed a significant increase in SIgA levels.

There have been claims that laughter can be a supplement for cardiovascular exercise and might increase muscle tone. However an early study by Paskind J. showed that laughter can lead to a decrease in skeletal muscle tone because the short intense muscle contractions caused by laughter are followed by longer periods of muscle relaxation. The cardiovascular benefits of laughter also seem to be just a figment of imagination as a study that was designed to test oxygen saturation levels produced by laughter showed that even though laughter creates sporadic episodes of deep breathing, oxygen saturation levels are not affected.

As humour is often used to ease tension, it might make sense that the same would be true for anxiety. A study by Yovetich N, Dale A, Hudak M. was designed to test the effects humour might have on relieving anxiety. The study subjects were told that they would be given an electric shock after a certain period of time. One group was exposed to humorous content, while the other was not. The anxiety levels were measured through self-report measures as well as heart rate. Subjects who rated high on sense of humour reported less anxiety in both groups, while subjects who rated lower on sense of humour reported less anxiety in the group that was exposed to the humorous material. However, there was not a significant difference in the heart rate between the subjects.

== In the workplace ==
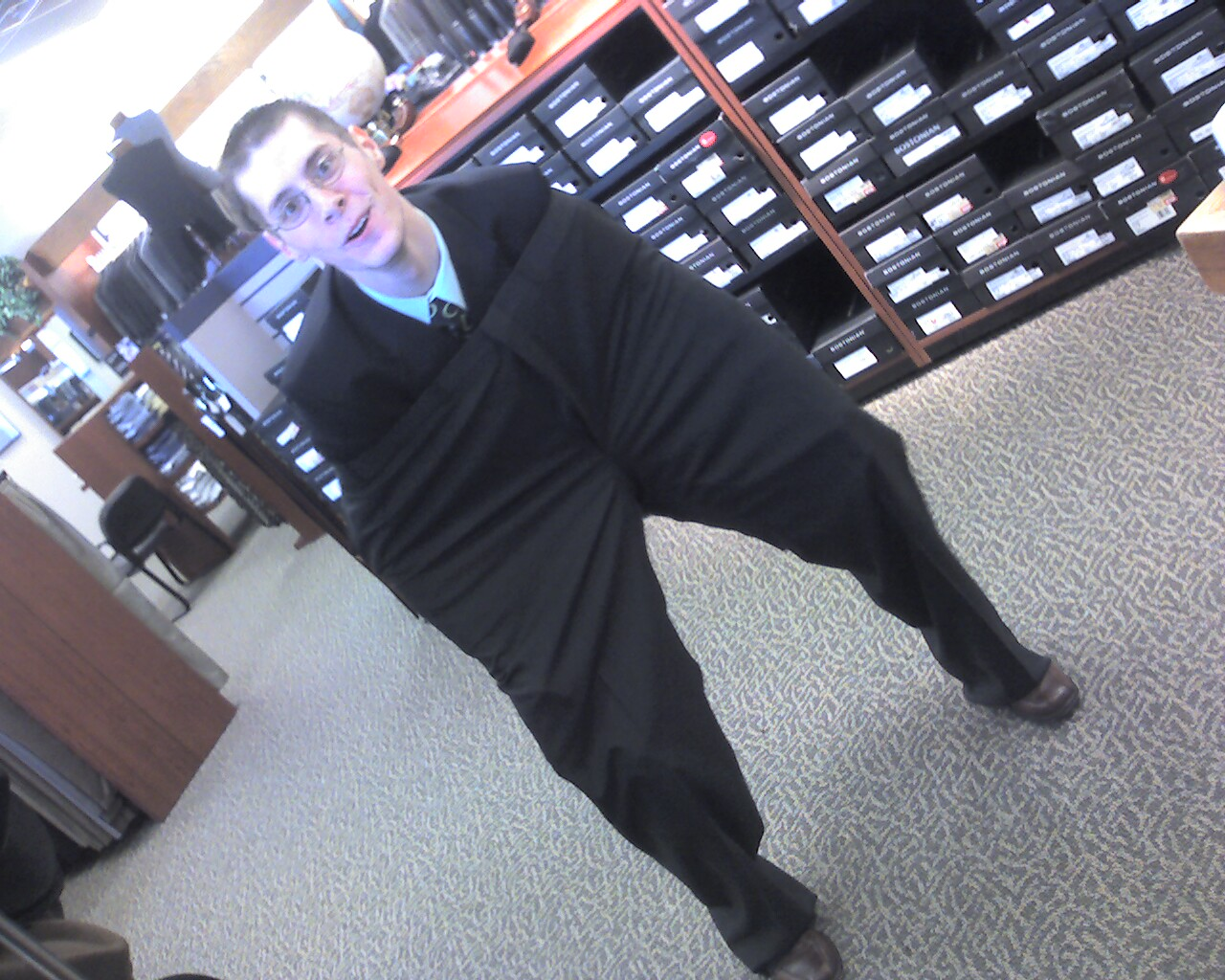
A person working in a retail store wearing a large pair of pants in an attempt to amuse those around them

Humour is a ubiquitous, highly ingrained, and largely meaningful aspect of human experience and is therefore decidedly relevant in organisational contexts, such as the workplace.

The significant role that laughter and fun play in organisational life has been seen as a sociological phenomenon and has increasingly been recognised as also creating a sense of involvement and possible comradery among workers.

Sharing humour at work not only offers a relief from boredom, but can also build relationships, improve camaraderie between colleagues and create positive affect. Humour in the workplace may also relieve tension and can be used as a coping strategy.

In fact, one of the most agreed-upon key impacts that workplace humour has on people's well-being is the use of humour as a coping strategy to aid in dealing with daily stresses, adversity or other difficult situations.

Sharing a laugh with a few colleagues may improve moods, which is pleasurable, and people perceive this as positively affecting their ability to cope.

Fun and enjoyment are critical in people's lives and the ability for colleagues to be able to laugh during work, through banter or other means, promotes harmony and a sense of cohesiveness.

Humour may also be used to offset negative feelings about a workplace task or to mitigate the use of profanity or other coping strategies that may not be otherwise tolerated.

Not only can humour in the workplace assist with defusing negative emotions, but it may also be used as an outlet to discuss personal painful events, in a lighter context, thus ultimately reducing anxiety and allowing more happy, positive emotions to surface.

Additionally, humour may be used as a tool to mitigate the authoritative tone by managers when giving directives to subordinates. Managers may use self-deprecating humour as a way to be perceived as more human and "real" by their employees.

The attachment to the notion of fun by contemporary companies has resulted in workplace management coming to recognise the potentially positive effects of "workplay" and realise that it does not necessarily undermine workers' performance.

Laughter and play can unleash creativity, thus raising morale, so in the interest of encouraging employee consent to the rigours of the labour process, management often ignore, tolerate and even actively encourage playful practices, with the purpose of furthering organisational goals. Essentially, fun in the workplace is no longer being seen as frivolous.

The most current approach of managed fun and laughter in the workplace originated in North America, where it has taken off to such a degree that it has humour consultants flourishing, as some states have introduced an official "fun at work" day. The results have carried claims of well-being benefits to workers, improved customer experiences and an increase in productivity that organisations can enjoy, as a result. Others examined results of this movement while focusing on the science of happiness—concerned with mental health, motivation, community building and national well-being—and drew attention to the ability to achieve "flow" through playfulness and stimulate "outside the box" thinking. Parallel to this movement is the "positive" scholarship that has emerged in psychology which seeks to empirically theorise the optimisation of human potential.

This happiness movement suggests that investing in fun at the workplace, by allowing for laughter and play, will not only create enjoyment and a greater sense of well-being, but it will also enhance energy, performance and commitment in workers.

== At school ==
The use of humour plays an important role in youth development. Studies have shown that humour is especially important in social interactions with peers. School entry is the time when the importance of parents fades into the background and social interaction with peers becomes increasingly important. Conflict is inherent in these interactions. The use of humour plays an important role in conflict resolution and ultimately in school success and psychological adjustment. The use of humour that is socially acceptable leads to a lower likelihood of being a victim of bullying, whereas the use of self-disparaging humour leads to a higher likelihood of being bullied. When students are bullied, the use of self-disparaging humour can lead to an exacerbation of the negative effects on the student's psychological adjustment to school.

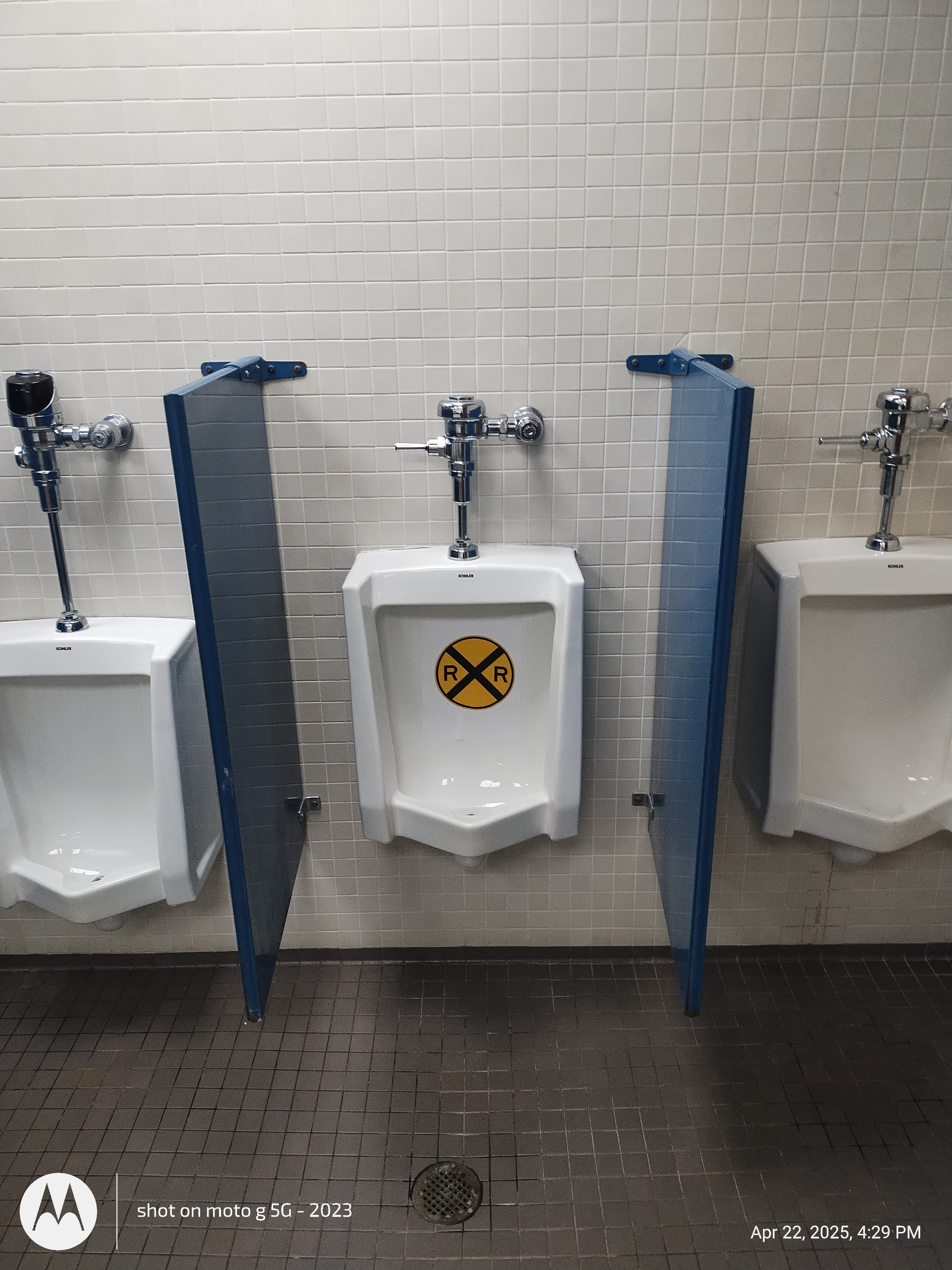
A railroad crossing sign placed in a urinal at a college, as a humorous prank

== Studies ==
=== Laughter ===
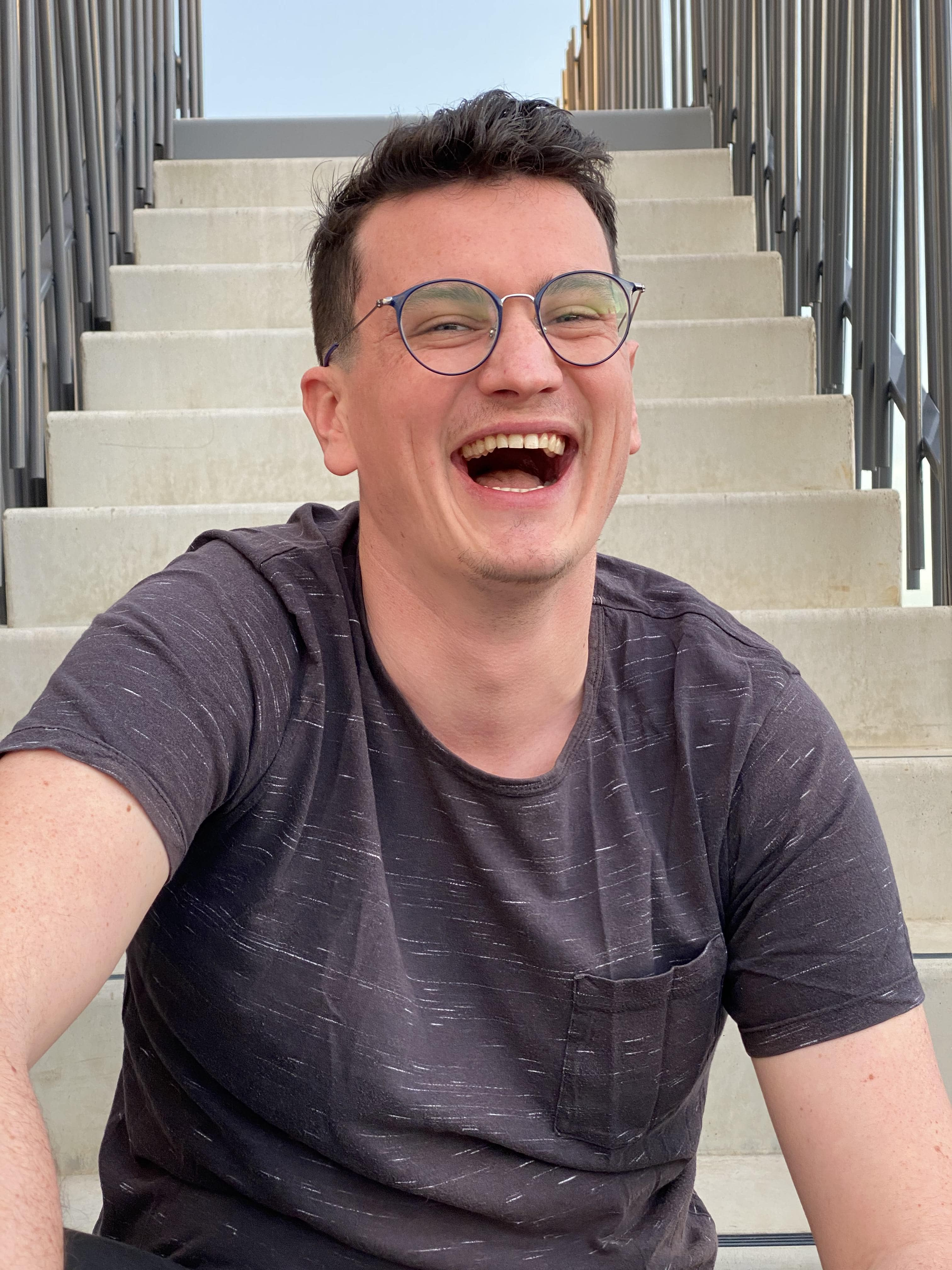
A man laughing

One of the main focuses of modern psychological humour theory and research is to establish and clarify the correlation between humour and laughter. The major empirical findings here are that laughter and humour do not always have a one-to-one association. While most previous theories assumed the connection between the two almost to the point of them being synonymous, psychology has been able to scientifically and empirically investigate the supposed connection, its implications, and significance.

In 2009, Diana Szameitat conducted a study to examine the differentiation of emotions in laughter. They hired actors and told them to laugh with one of four different emotional associations by using auto-induction, where they would focus exclusively on the internal emotion and not on the expression of laughter itself. They found an overall recognition rate of 44%, with joy correctly classified at 44%, tickle 45%, schadenfreude 37%, and taunt 50%. Their second experiment tested the behavioural recognition of laughter during an induced emotional state and they found that different laughter types did differ with respect to emotional dimensions. In addition, the four emotional states displayed a full range of high and low sender arousal and valence. This study showed that laughter can be correlated with both positive (joy and tickle) and negative (schadenfreude and taunt) emotions with varying degrees of arousal in the subject.

This brings into question the definition of humour, then. If it is to be defined by the cognitive processes which display laughter, then humour itself can encompass a variety of negative as well as positive emotions. However, if humour is limited to positive emotions and things which cause positive affect, it must be delimited from laughter and their relationship should be further defined.

=== Health ===
Adaptive Humour use has been shown to be effective for increasing resilience in dealing with distress and also effective in buffering against or undoing negative affects. In contrast, maladaptive humour use can magnify potential negative effects.

Madelijn Strick, Rob Holland, Rick van Baaren, and Ad van Knippenberg (2009) of Radboud University conducted a study that showed the distracting nature of a joke on bereaved individuals. Subjects were presented with a wide range of negative pictures and sentences. Their findings showed that humorous therapy attenuated the negative emotions elicited after negative pictures and sentences were presented. In addition, the humour therapy was more effective in reducing negative affect as the degree of affect increased in intensity. Humour was immediately effective in helping to deal with distress. The escapist nature of humour as a coping mechanism suggests that it is most useful in dealing with momentary stresses. Stronger negative stimuli require a different therapeutic approach.

Humour is an underlying character trait associated with the positive emotions used in the broaden-and-build theory of cognitive development.

Studies, such as those testing the undoing hypothesis, have shown several positive outcomes of humour as an underlying positive trait in amusement and playfulness. Several studies have shown that positive emotions can restore autonomic quiescence after negative affect. For example, Frederickson and Levinson showed that individuals who expressed Duchenne smiles during the negative arousal of a sad and troubling event recovered from the negative affect approximately 20% faster than individuals who did not smile.

Using humour judiciously can have a positive influence on cancer treatment. The effectiveness for humour‐based interventions in patients with schizophrenia is uncertain in a Cochrane review.

Humour can serve as a strong distancing mechanism in coping with adversity. In 1997, Kelter and Bonanno found that Duchenne laughter correlated with reduced awareness of distress. Positive emotion can loosen the grip of negative emotions on people's thinking. A distancing of thought leads to a distancing of the unilateral responses people often have to negative arousal. In parallel with the distancing role it plays in coping with distress, it supports the broaden and build theory that positive emotions lead to increased multilateral cognitive pathways and social resource building.

=== Ageing ===
Humour has been shown to improve and help the ageing process in three areas. The areas are improving physical health, improving social communications, and helping to achieve a sense of satisfaction in life.

Studies have shown that constant humour in the ageing process gives health benefits to individuals. Such benefits include higher self-esteem, lower levels of depression, anxiety, and perceived stress, and a more positive self-concept as well as other health benefits which have been recorded and acknowledged through various studies. Even patients with specific diseases have shown improvement with ageing using humour. Overall there is a strong correlation through constant humour in ageing and better health in the individuals.

Another way that research indicates that humour helps with the ageing process is through helping the individual to create and maintain strong social relationships during transitory periods in their lives. One such example is when people are moved into nursing homes or other facilities of care. With this transition certain social interactions with friends and family may be limited forcing the individual to look elsewhere for these social interactions. Humour has been shown to make transitions easier, as humour is shown reduce stress and facilitate socialisation and serves as a social bonding function. Humour may also help the transition in helping the individual to maintain positive feelings towards those who are enforcing the changes in their lives. These new social interactions can be critical for these transitions in their lives and humour will help these new social interactions to take place making these transitions easier.

Humour can also help ageing individuals maintain a sense of satisfaction in their lives. Through the ageing process many changes will occur, such as losing the right to drive a car. This can cause a decrease in satisfaction in the lives of the individual. Humour helps to alleviate this decrease in satisfaction by allowing the humour to release stress and anxiety caused by changes in the individual's life. Laughing and humour can be a substitute for the decrease in satisfaction by allowing individuals to feel better about their situations by alleviating the stress. This, in turn, can help them to maintain a sense of satisfaction towards their new and changing lifestyle.

=== Physiology ===
In an article published in Nature Reviews Neuroscience, it is reported that a study's results indicate that humour is rooted in the frontal lobe of the cerebral cortex. The study states, in part:

"Humour seems to engage a core network of cortical and subcortical structures, including temporo-occipito-parietal areas involved in detecting and resolving incongruity (mismatch between expected and presented stimuli); and the mesocorticolimbic dopaminergic system and the amygdala, key structures for reward and salience processing."

== Formula ==
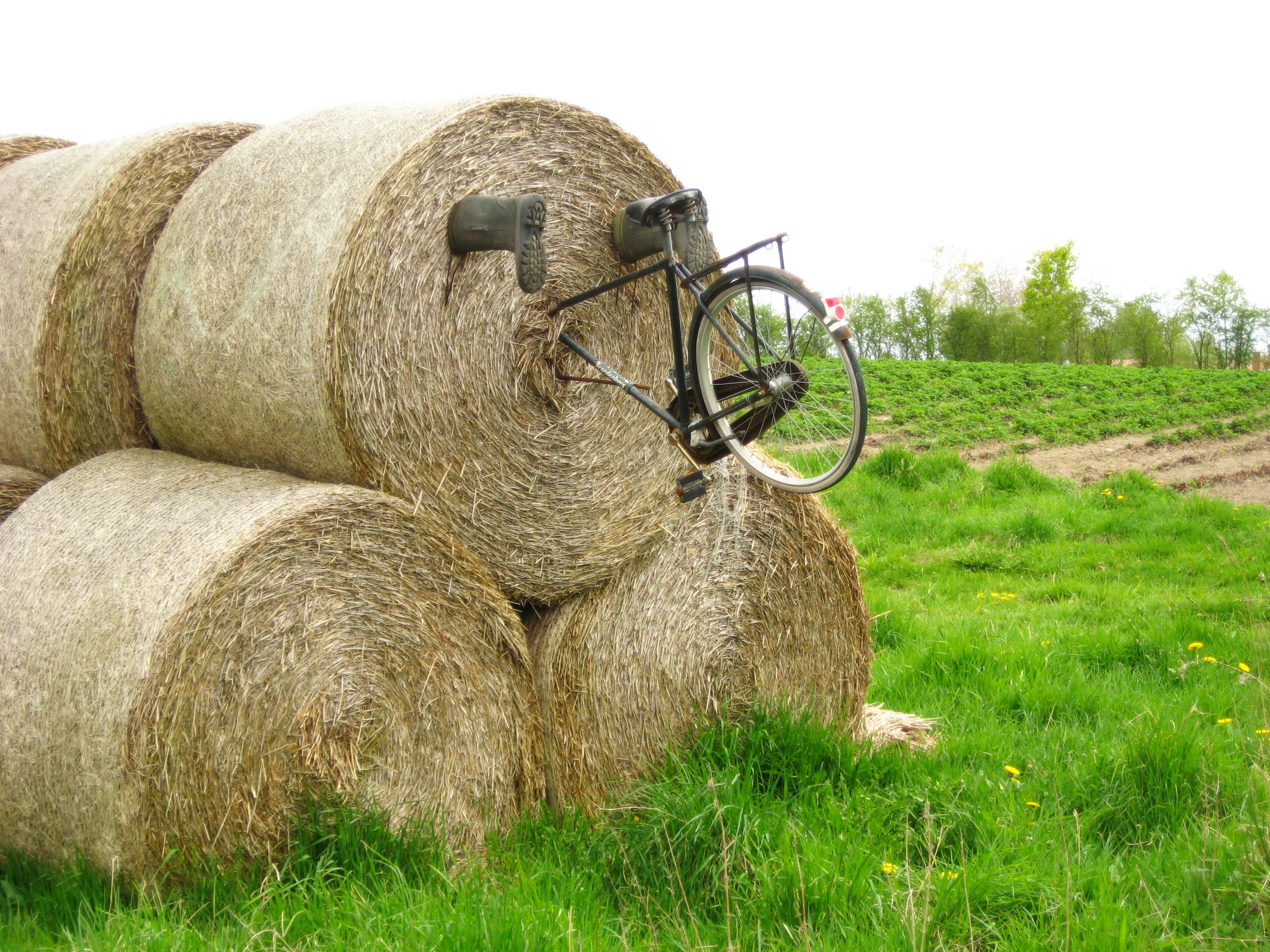
Surprise is a component of humour.

Humour can be verbal, visual, or physical. Non-verbal forms of communication–for example, music or visual art–can also be humorous.

=== Root components ===
- Being reflective of or imitative of reality
- Surprise/misdirection, contradiction/paradox, ambiguity.

=== Methods ===
- Farce
- Hyperbole
- Metaphor
- Pun
- Reframing
- Self-deprecation
- Timing
- Deadpan
- Sarcasm

=== Behaviour, place and size ===
Rowan Atkinson explained in his lecture in the documentary Funny Business that an object or a person can become funny in three ways:

- by behaving in an unusual way,
- by being in an unusual place,
- by being the wrong size.

Most sight gags fit into one or more of these categories.

=== Exaggeration ===
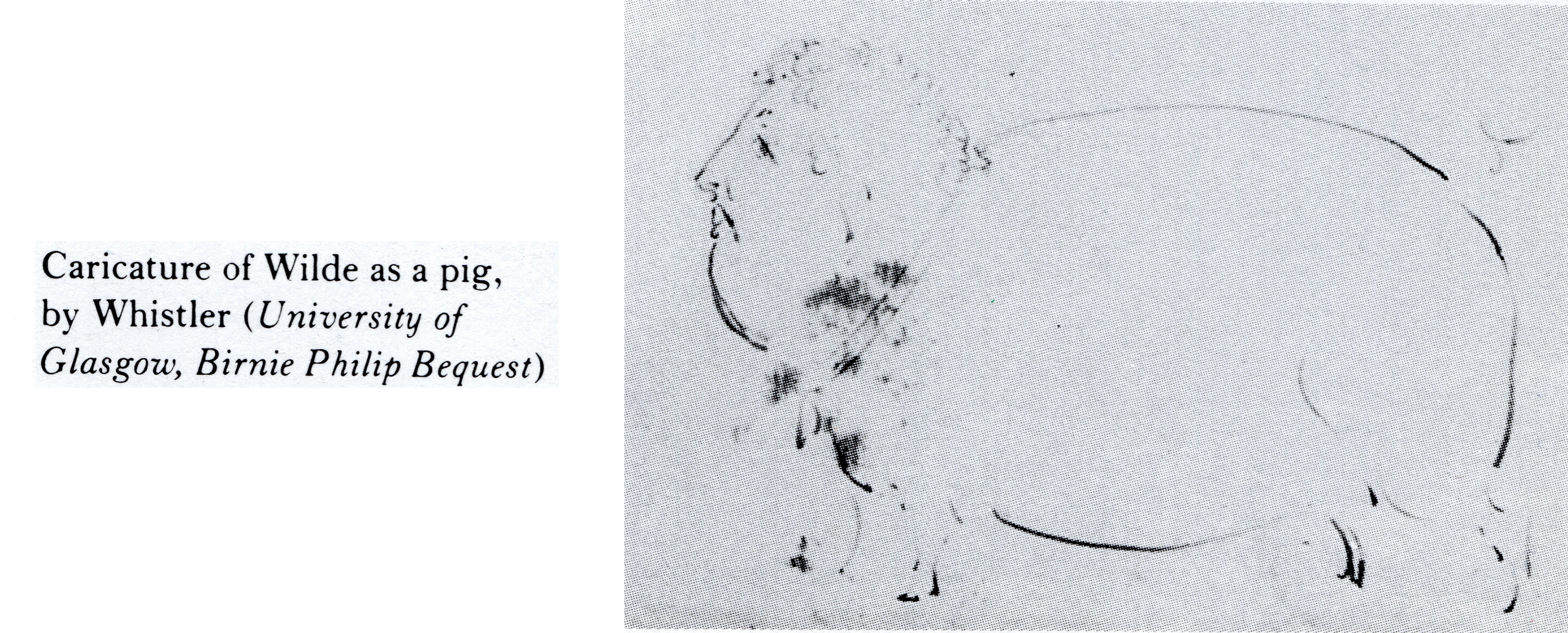
An exaggerating caricature of Oscar Wilde by James McNeill Whistler

Some theoreticians of the comic consider exaggeration to be a universal comic device. It may take different forms in different genres, but all rely on the fact that the easiest way to make things laughable is to exaggerate to the point of absurdity their salient traits,

== Taxonomy ==
There are many taxonomies of humour; the following is used to classify humorous tweets in (Rayz 2012).

1. Anecdotes
2. Fantasy
3. Insult
4. Irony
5. Jokes
6. Observational
7. Quote
8. Role play
9. Self-deprecation
10. Vulgarity
11. Word play
12. Other

== See also ==
- Uncyclopedia – Satirical website
- American humor
- Australian humour
- British humour
- Canadian humour
- Cognitive humor processing – How a human processes something as "funny"
- Deadpan – Emotional neutrality that contrasts comedy
- Form-versus-content humour – Humour category
- Gelotology – Study of laughter and its effects
- German humour – Humour considered typical for Germany
- Humour in translation – Translation mistakes amusing to native speakers
- Humour styles – Distinct ways in which people use humor
- Jewish humour – Wit and humor in Jewish culture
- List of humorists
- Surreal humour – Form of humour predicated on deliberate violations of causal reasoning
- Theories of humour – Conjectures explaining humor
- Wine humour
