= Meng Hetang =

Chinese xiangsheng comedian and actor

- Born: Meng Xianghui (孟祥辉); 26 April 1988 (age 38); Harbin, Heilongjiang, China
- Occupation: Crosstalk actor

Chinese name
- Traditional Chinese: 孟鶴堂
- Simplified Chinese: 孟鹤堂
Transcriptions
Standard Mandarin
- Hanyu Pinyin: Mèng Hètáng
- Website: www.weibo.com/hhhxxxmmm

Meng Hetang (simplified Chinese: 孟鹤堂; traditional Chinese: 孟鶴堂; pinyin: Mèng Hètáng), original name Meng Xianghui, born in Harbin, China, is a Chinese crosstalk (xiangsheng) comedian and actor. He partners with Zhou Jiuliang on stage and currently leads Performance Team 7 in Deyunshe. He won Xiangsheng Has New Talents (相声有新人) in 2018 and made his film debut with Da Ying Jia in 2020. He had a famous slogan Panta (盘他!), the word "pan" in the antique refers to the repeated friction to make the play surface more smooth and textured, "ta" means it.

== Biography ==
Meng Hetang was born on April 26, 1988, in Harbin, China. Upon graduation from Heilongjiang Art Vocational College, Meng passed the interview to join Deyunshe in 2008. He officially became an apprentice to Guo Degang on June 13, 2009. Guo gave the character He(鹤)for him and called him Meng Hetang. He(鹤) is the second level in Deyunshe.

Meng started his stage career in Deyunshe theaters with Performance Team 5 and moved to captain Performance Team 7 in 2017. He held his first personal Xiangsheng Performance in big theatre with Zhou Jiuliang in 2018. From August to October 2018, Meng starred in Xiangsheng Has New Talents, a Xiangsheng talent show airing on national TV, and won first place with Zhou Jiuliang. In 2020, he participated in Happy Comedian Season 6 and won second place.

Meng starred in Neng Nai Da Le, a Deyunshe-produced TV series in 2018. In 2020, Meng made his film debut with Da Ying Jia, starring as supporting character Zhou You. However, the movie was not released in movie theatres due to the COVID-19 pandemic.

Participated in Shandong Spring Festival Gala on February 2, 2019 February 5th, participated in "Spring in the East·Dragon TV Spring Festival Gala"， with many people to perform group crosstalk "Crosstalk Family"

On February 6, attended the "Come on Chinese New Year" Tianjin Radio and Television Spring Festival Gala. On February 19, attended Hunan Satellite TV's Lantern Festival Gala.

On October 2, "Love of the Yangtze River - National Day Theme Gala of 12 Provinces and Cities in the Yangtze River Basin" was broadcast on Dragon TV. Meng Hetang led the crosstalk "Laughter and Joy" in the gala.

In January 2020, Meng Hetang participated in the Dragon TV comedy competition variety show "Happy Comedian Season 6" as the first comedian.

On March 20, the comedy film "The Big Winner" was released nationwide. Meng Hetang played the lobby manager Zhou You in the play. On May 23, Meng Hetang participated in "Happy Camp".On June 27, he appeared on Happy Camp again, and his performance of treading water in the air received a lot of praise.

On August 17, the reality show "Deyun Douxiaoshe" produced by Tencent Video officially announced the main guest lineup, and a total of 12 crosstalk performers including Meng Hetang appeared on the show.

On February 10, 2021, Meng Hetang attended the 2021 Tianjin Satellite TV Spring Festival Gala.

On February 26, participated in the 2021 CCTV Lantern Festival Gala. On July 11, the TV series "Wanchun Laughter Club" also known as "North Latitude Road No. 1" started filming. On August 20, the second season of Deyun Douxiaoshe was broadcast.

On January 15, 2023, the variety show "Open Mic Tonight" in which Meng Hetang participated was broadcast on Dragon TV.On February 3, the costume comedy "Washe Jianghu" starring him was broadcast on iQiyi. On January 22, participated in the "2023 Jiangsu Satellite TV Spring Festival Gala"

On February 5, the "2023 Global Overseas Chinese New Year Cloud Gala" in which he participated was broadcast.On the same day, he participated in the Oriental TV program "Super Funny Lantern Festival". On June 15, the "Comedy Night" in which he participated was broadcast. On August 26, the outdoor travel documentary variety show "Set Out for the Mountains and Seas" in which Meng Hetang participated was broadcast.

On February 3, 2024, attend the "Together for the Future - 2024 China Internet Audiovisual Annual Ceremony".On February 11, participated in the "2024 Tianjin Satellite TV Crosstalk Spring Festival Gala" On February 24, he participated in the 2024 Dragon TV Lantern Festival Gala.

=== Film ===
Year	Title	Chinese title	Role
2020	Da Ying Jia	大赢家	Zhou You

=== Television ===
Year	Title	Chinese title	Role
2019	Neng Nai Da Le	能耐大了	Tang Tang

=== Variety Shows ===
Year	Aired	Platform	Title	Chinese title	Notes
2010	November 17	Tianjin TV	Show Tonight	《今夜有戏》	
2012	January 25	Jiangsu TV	Can't Stop Laughing	《不得不笑》	
2012	March 29	Liaoning TV	Keep Cool	《有话好好说》	
2014	January 6	Liaoning TV	Qian's World	《大谦世界》	Host
2015	March 28	Tianjin TV	Guo Se Tian Xiang	《国色天香》	Supporting Role
2018	August 11 – October 27	Dragon TV	Xiangsheng Has New Talents	《相声有新人》	Won First Place
2019	April 7	Dragon TV	Happy Comedian, Season 5	《欢乐喜剧人 第五季》第十二期	Supporting Role
2019	August 1	Hunan TV	Magical Chinese Characters	《神奇的汉字》	Elite Round
2019	August 4	Hunan TV	Magical Chinese Characters	《神奇的汉字》	Penggen vs Dougen
2019	August 13	Hunan TV	Magical Chinese Characters	《神奇的汉字》	Elite Encore Round
2019	August 15	Hunan TV	Magical Chinese Characters	《神奇的汉字》	Final Elite Round
2019	December 1	Hunan TV	Day Day Up	《天天向上》	
2020	January 23	Tianjin TV	Deyunshe Spring Festival Xiangsheng Gala	《德云社春节相声晚会》	
2020	January 26 – May 3	Dragon TV	Happy Comedian, Season 6	《欢乐喜剧人 第六季》	Won Second Place
2020		Hunan TV	Happy Camp	《快乐大本营》	
2020	June 26	Golden Eagle Cartoon	Happy Baby Go	《疯狂的麦咭 第七季》	
2020	June 27	Hunan TV	Happy Camp	《快乐大本营》	
2020	July 11	Hunan TV	Happy Camp	《快乐大本营》	
2020		Hunan TV	Day Day Up	《天天向上》	
2020	August 13 –	Hunan TV	Go Newbies	《新手驾到》	
2020	August 27 –	Tencent	Deyun DouXiaoShe	《德云斗笑社》	
