= The Unfortunate Car =

- Traditional Chinese: 車在囧途
- Simplified Chinese: 车在囧途
- Hanyu Pinyin: Chēzaì Jiǒngtú
- Directed by: Hua Yuan; Bao Jiming
- Written by: Huayuan; Yin Guojun
- Produced by: Hu Lifu
- Starring: Guo Degang; Viann Zhang; Ambrose Hui; Wang Yi'nan
- Cinematography: Zheng Minqiang
- Edited by: Wang Nan
- Music by: Zhou Huo
- Production company: Cn Top Media
- Distributed by: China Film Group Corporation
- Release date: April 1, 2012
- Running time: 90 minutes
- Country: China
- Language: Mandarin
- Box office: ¥20 million

The Unfortunate Car is a 2012 Chinese romantic comedy film directed by Hua Yuan and Bao Jiming, and written by Huayuan and Yin Guojun. The film stars Guo Degang, Viann Zhang, Ambrose Hui, and Wang Yi'nan. It was released in China on April Fools' Day.

== Plot ==
Cars, a common means of transportation, play an increasingly important role in modern life. Buying a car has actually become a positive and dynamic investment. In terms of social significance and spiritual needs, it enables people to have more active exchanges with the city, which is irreplaceable by other personal investment methods. This film is based on this conception. The four people, Guo Lixing, a "stingy rich businessman", Yan Xiaolian, a "single mother contractor", Chen Bo, a "romantic petty bourgeois man", and Yi Rong, a "white-collar worker who loves online shopping", bought a "car" for different personal purposes, which triggered a series of "embarrassing" things. What is actually shown is the conflict process caused by the difference in values around the car, and the detailed portrayal of the different groups of people in urban life, involving many current social hot topics such as "carpooling", "lottery", "traffic restrictions", "Alexander" tribe, etc., adding fresh and spicy jokes, reflecting the dilemma of the protagonists in laughter and anger, and reflecting the real life of young people struggling in first-tier cities from the side.

== Cast ==
- Guo Degang as Guo Lihang, a stingy rich merchant.
- Viann Zhang as Yi Rong, a white-collar.
- Ambrose Hui as Chen Bo, a petty bourgeoisie.
- Wang Yi'nan as Yan Xiaolian, a single mother.

=== Other ===
- Pan Changjiang as one of the pyramid selling leader.
- Qu Ying as one of the pyramid selling leader.
- Yu Qian as the Manager Hu.

== Production ==
The film began production on June 17, 2011, and finished filming on July 14, 2011.

== Reception ==
=== Critical response ===
The film received negative reviews.

=== Box office ===
The film grossed ¥20 million on its first weekend.
