= Mystery (2014 film) =

- Directed by: Wu Bing
- Starring: Ady An; Jiro Wang; Guo Degang; Ning Huanyu; Julie Tan
- Production company: Beijing Dashidu Media
- Release date: November 14, 2014
- Running time: 83 minutes
- Country: China
- Language: Mandarin
- Box office: ¥4.58 million (China)

Mystery (Chinese: 秘术) is a 2014 Chinese suspense thriller adventure film directed by Wu Bing. It was released on November 14, 2014.

== Cast ==
- Ady An
- Jiro Wang
- Guo Degang
- Ning Huanyu
- Julie Tan

== Reception ==
=== Box office ===
By November 21, 2014, the film had earned ¥4.58 million at the Chinese box office.
