= Cognitive humor processing =

How a human processes something as "funny"

Cognitive humor processing refers to the neural circuitry and pathways that are involved in detecting incongruities of various situations presented in a humorous manner. Over the past decade, many studies have emerged utilizing fMRI studies to describe the neural correlates associated with how a human processes something that is considered "funny". Conceptually, humor is subdivided into two elements: cognitive and affective. The cognitive element, known as humor detection, refers to understanding the joke. Usually, this is characterized by the perceiver attempting to comprehend the disparities between the punch line and prior experience. The affective element, otherwise known as humor appreciation, is involved with enjoying the joke and producing visceral, emotional responses depending on the hilarity of the joke. This ability to comprehend and appreciate humor is a vital aspect of social functioning and is a significant part of the human condition that is relevant from a very early age. Humor comprehension develops in parallel with growing cognitive and language skills during childhood, while its content is mostly influenced by social and cultural factors. A further approach is described which refers to humor as an attitude related to strains. Humorous responses when confronted with troubles are discussed as a skill often associated with high social competence. The concept of humor has also been shown to have therapeutic effects, improving physiological systems such as the immune and central nervous system. It also has been shown to help cope with stress and pain. In sum, humor proves to be a personal resource throughout the life span, and helps support the coping of everyday tasks.

== Development ==
The understanding of humor, humor production, and functionality of humor, evolves in the course of a lifetime and is essentially determined by cognitive, verbal and social abilities. Differences in humor appreciation are seen between individuals and can be attributed to the development of the neural systems underlying humor cognition during early childhood, which can continue through normal aging. Recent investigations have emphasized the importance of the prefrontal cortex for humor processing. Changes to the prefrontal cortex, a consequence of normal aging, can be traced to changes in the ways individuals appreciate humor.

=== Early age ===
The cognitive component of humor is clearly exemplified during the years of childhood, which is characterized by evolving cognitive structures. As a child advances from one degree of cognition to the next, what is considered humorous and what is not should also manifest a meaningful progression. Understanding any particular joke may call upon an array of cognitive processes such as condensations, awareness of incongruities (the cognitive component), and the ability to comprehend unusual verbal representations. The intrinsic gratification involved in the brain activity underlying humor is also encountered in mental activities such as solving puzzles and decoding mysteries.

==== Mirth response test ====
In September 1966 a study was conducted concerning the effects of cognition on humor comprehension during the learning years of a child. The experimenters concluded that there was a positive relation between the mirth response and the degree of comprehension. Mirth is defined as any expression that reflects amusement, especially in the form of laughter. This study implied that the human's ability to comprehend text-based and visual information at a higher level resulted in a higher probability of joke or cartoon appreciation. Children from grades 2-5 were the subjects of this study. Results showed a strong positive correlation between grade level and comprehension; however the mirth response nose dives dramatically after fourth grade. This discrepancy can be explained by the principal of cognitive congruency, which states that fewer cognitive demands will elicit a lower mirth response than those that are in keeping with the complexity of the child's cognitive apparatus. Basically, if the cartoon is deemed "dumb", then they will not give a mirth response.

Frontal lobe – medial cut

=== Normal aging ===
The frontal aging hypothesis suggests that the prefrontal cortex is particularly vulnerable to the effects of aging and implies that functions supported by the frontal lobes will be disproportionately impaired. The volume of the frontal cortex and its pronounced age-related alterations in the 5-HT2 and D2 receptor availability are the basis for this hypothesis and point to the impairment of executive functions including working memory, inhibition, and planning. The ways in which executive functions were measured to testify the age-related decreases in frontal lobe activity with humor comprehension included three assessors: inhibition, set shifting, and working memory. It is seen across several studies that older adults have the capability of selecting the proper punchline of a joke in comparison to younger adults, but they are shown to select a lot fewer total selections. Older adults made more choices of logical alternatives and even showed a tendency to select more slapstick humor.

=== Old age and pathology ===
Though there are many studies about the developmental aspects of humor, from infancy through adolescence and adulthood, relatively little research is devoted to the study of humor with elderly (65+) populations. The small pool of research out there devoted to the geriatric effect on humor cognition suggests that elderly people enjoy humor more than younger people, but they have increasing difficulties in understanding jokes. In other words, the humor appreciation component for older people is more active, but the mechanisms devoted to detection are lacking. Also, the amount of laughter exhibited by the elderly is smaller compared to young adults. In addition, the older population seems to not enjoy aggressive types of humor as much as the younger ones, and the elderly are especially sensitive to jokes referring to old age. It is interesting to point out the "see-saw" effect aging has in terms of the brain mechanisms underlying humor. Despite the apparent decreases in the cognitive component of humor understanding, the affective element remains steady, if not more refined and enhanced. The greater bilateral activation older adults have during cognitively demanding tasks may describe the reasons older adults seem to struggle with jokes that are graded at a higher comprehension difficulty. Of course, cohort effects might play a role in an older adult's capacity to understand jokes. Perhaps several cultural factors that remain in the unconscious thinking processes are critical in understanding meaning behind some jokes.

==== Parkinson's disease ====
The neocortex, basal ganglia, diencephalon, and limbic system are affected by Parkinson's disease and are also brain areas underlying the cognitive processes of humor detection and appreciation. A few studies have confirmed that patients with Parkinson's have a lower appreciation for humor as indicated by sense of humor questionnaires. This relationship is seen across multiple presentation styles including video, audio, and cartoon. Primarily, the affective part of humor, otherwise known as humor appreciation, is the main victim of PD-related brain changes. This could be linked to consequential neurological changes in the amygdala, mesolimbic dopaminergic reward system, and basal ganglia. Parkinson's patients demonstrate an inhibited ability to identify emotions of other people from both speech prosody and facial expressions. The neural circuitry during the humor appreciation phase also involves the amygdala and are thought to be used during the recollection of emotional memories. The therapeutic capabilities of humor could prove to be fruitful for patients with Parkinson's disease, so it is important to identify the mechanisms underlying both humor detection and appreciation.

== Mechanisms ==
Recent fMRI studies have begun to elucidate the cognitive and affective neural correlates associated with humor processing. But these correlates, corresponding to the stages of humor detection and humor appreciation respectively, fail to distinguish between these different logical mechanisms. A medley of studies have started to investigate the differences between these steps in humor processing and the neural circuitry that underlie these mechanisms. The pun-intended phrase "the right hemisphere has the last laugh" has been adopted by scientists in this field due to its significance during appreciation, but it is widely accepted that humor appreciation and detection rely on neural circuitry from temporal and prefrontal regions from both hemispheres. These brain areas also contribute to humor processing in three distinct spatiotemporal stages: surface level semantic analysis and two phases of the interpretative integrative processes. The surface level semantic analysis is subserved by bilateral anterior temporal and left inferior prefrontal regions. Interpretive integrative processing comprises detection of ambiguity or conflict between the dominant semantic representations of the punch line and the context, which is reflected in semantic, phonological, metaphorical, and other supralinguistic integrations of the punch line with the preceding sentence. In regards to the detection process, the right medial temporal gyrus is active during detection of semantic violations, and the right middle frontal gyrus is active for context monitoring. The three distinct stages of neural activation during the humor process implies that humor detection and appreciation operate as separate entities and engage different brain regions in an ordered fashion. Therefore, the cascade of neural events required to understand and appreciate humor can be functionally separated, and studies have shown this distinction to be consistent across all genres of comedy. During moments of humor detection, significant activation can be seen in the [[left posterior middle temporal gyrus]] and left inferior frontal gyrus. During moments of humor appreciation, increased activation in bilateral regions of insular cortex and amygdala can be observed.

Parahippocampal gyrus animation

=== Verbal ===
The verbal medium through which humor can be conveyed elicits a theory separate from the popular incongruity-resolution theory. The comprehension-elaboration theory is not much different from the incongruity-resolution theory, however it accounts for several incongruities found in language that are not considered humorous. Corrected misunderstandings, scientific discoveries, and silent responses to ‘bad jokes’ all present incongruity-resolution characteristics, but do not generate humor. In the comprehension–elaboration theory of humor, comprehension refers to the detection and resolution of incongruities. The elaboration follows comprehension, involves the conscious generation of inferences for features not made explicit during comprehension, and elicits the unconscious or conscious feeling of amusement. Studies utilizing fMRI have shown that, like the incongruity-resolution theory, the comprehension-elaboration theory can be separated into two distinct neurological schedules of activity. During comprehension, greater activation in the left dorsal inferior frontal gyrus, left superior frontal gyrus, and left ventral stratum can be seen. During elaboration, the left ventromedial prefrontal gyrus, bilateral amygdala, and bilateral parahippocampal gyrus show greater activity.

=== Non-verbal ===
Studies have shown that a wide area around the temporoparietal junction (temporo-occipital junction, posterior superior temporal sulcus, posterior middle temporal gyrus), temporal pole and inferior frontal gyrus (IFG) is involved in cognitive humor processing of nonverbal cartoons. Studies in recent years have revealed discrete characteristic patterns of cerebral blood-oxygen-level dependent activity induced by non-verbal cartoons with different logical mechanisms. The TPJ is involved in successful incongruity resolution but not in the detection of incongruity. The extrastriate cortex is activated particularly during processing of visual puns, whereas semantic cartoons evoked activity mainly in the TPJ and precuneus. The TPJ and precuneus areas are involved in mentalizing and are more strongly activated during processing of Theory of Mind cartoons compared to visual puns and semantic cartoons.
