= Deyunshe =

Chinese xiangsheng and art performance group

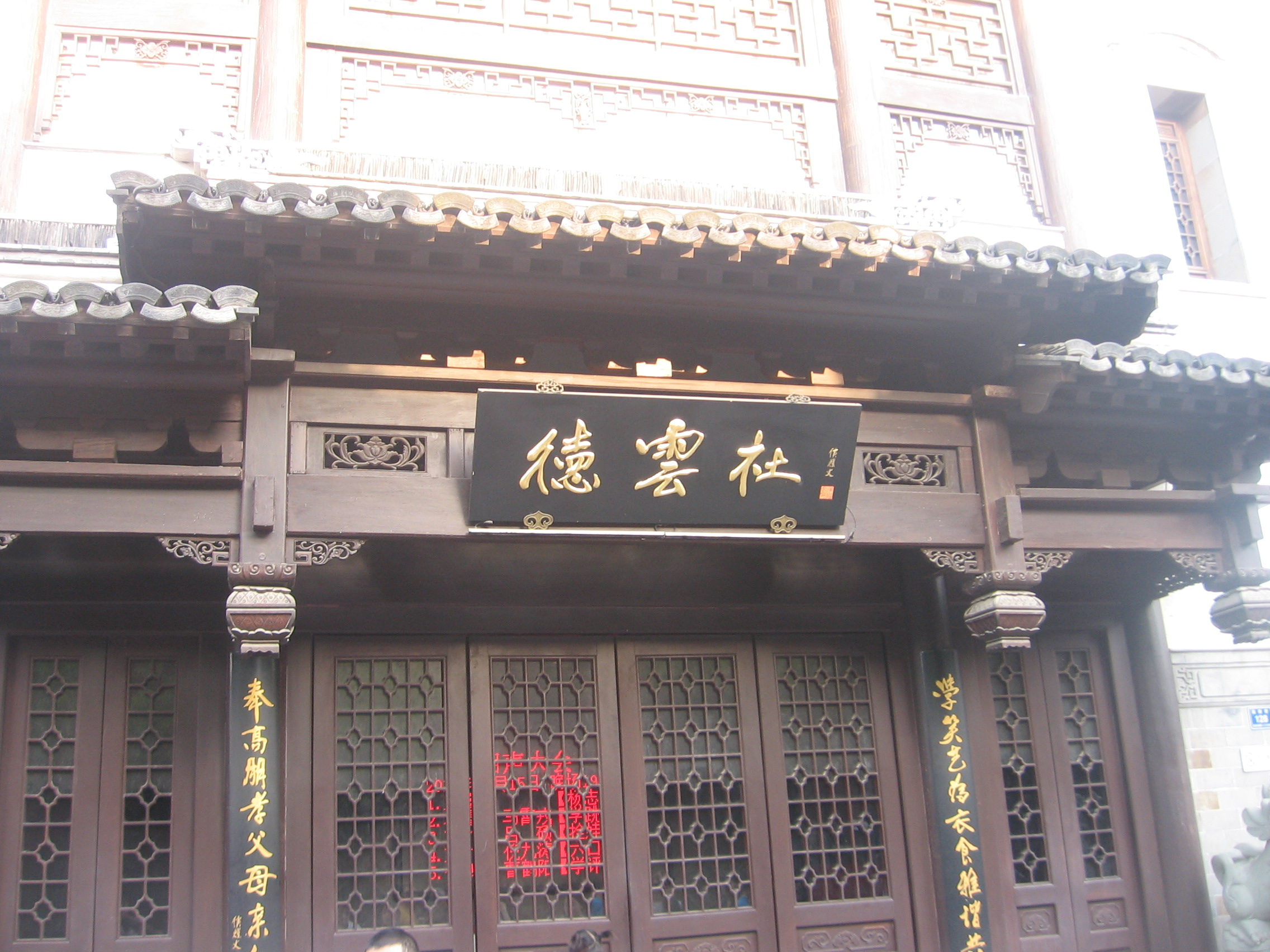
- Nanjing branch
- Company type: Private
- Industry: Entertainment
- Founder: Guo Degang, Zhang Wenshun, Li Jing
- Headquarters: Beijing, China
- Area served: Worldwide
- Key people: Guo Degang, Yu Qian
- Members: 117

Deyunshe (Chinese: 德云社), formally Beijing Deyunshe Culture Communication Company Ltd., is a Chinese xiangsheng organization and folk art performance group based in Beijing, established by comedians Zhang Wenshun, Guo Degang and Li Jing in 1995. Originally known as the Beijing Conversation Conference, in 2003 it changed its name to Deyunshe. It is the key to "let the cross talk back to the theatre". On July 3, 2011, Deyunshe inaugurated a new form in the Beizhan Theatre, by using the dialects dramas and comic dialogues to interpret the cross talks of various styles from the Qing dynasty to the Republic of China.

== Xiangsheng ==
The performance form of Deyunshe is xiangsheng (cross-talk) which is originally meant to stimulate others, but it has been standardised by the form of rhyming techniques such as the vocalisation of the mouth during the Qing Xianfeng and Tongzhi eras in North China.

== History ==
=== Founding ===
Xiangsheng (Cross talk), which has been one of the most popular Chinese verbal performance art since its emergence during the Qing dynasty. However, in the beginning of 1990s, Xiangsheng began to lose the popularity. Chinese cross-talk art went into a trough, and many comic actors went to the film industry to pan for gold. Performing Xiangsheng does not make money, and it is a laborious and unrewarding profession. An important reason for the decline in crosstalk is that the crosstalk performance on TV, the main media for broadcast crosstalk performance at the time, due to the restriction of the program and the lack of reasonable skills and keen observation of real life for many performers, the cross talk is monotonous. Guo Degang, then in his twenties, believes that cross-talk art needs to return to the theater to survive and develop. Folk art is inextricably linked to the soil of survival and development, and comedians must approach the audience to gain an interaction. On the one hand, Guo organized the Beijing Conversation Conference with the support of a group of “literary generations” of old artists, on the other hand, he began to excavate more than 600 pieces of literary programs that were lost. In order to retrieve the lost audience, Deyunshe presented uncensored performances that approached the real life of the audience and often satirized argumentative and sensitive issues in the small theatre. Guo' Xiangsheng performance that revolve around the subjects of ethics, pornography, and prostitution. This style has drawn criticism from some critics, because of the Su (Vulgarity).

=== Maturity ===
In the fifteen years, from the Workers' Club to the Zhonghe Theatre; from Guangde Building to Tianqiao Le Tea Garden. Guo Degang and Zhang Wenshun, Li Jing, Wang Wenlin, Yu Qian and other actors from the Deyunshe not only created the brand of “Beijing Conversation Conference” with painstaking efforts and sweat, but also cultivated outstanding young actors such as He Yunwei, Cao Yunjin, Liu Yuntian (Liu Yi), Qi Yunping, Kong Yunlong, Yue Yunpeng, Zhang Yunlei, Li Yunjie. Guo Degang's persistence and wisdom in the art of cross talk has also added new hope to the revitalization of comic art. In addition to Xiangsheng shows, Deyunshe has invested in a number of comic TV series and movies, the role of which is principally played by the actors of Deyunshe, in order to sustain and augment the hard-won reputation. On April 15, 2013, Beijing Deyunshe held a reception in Melbourne and officially announced the establishment of the Deyunshe Melbourne Branch. This is the first branch of the Chinese cross-talk society established overseas.

=== Temporary shutdown ===
In 2010, Deyunshe ushered in the biggest crisis since its establishment. On the evening of August 6, 2010, Guo Degang’s disciples beat the reporter’s incident and triggered discussion again. Deyunshe’s statement on the official website stated that it would stop the internal investigation. The following is the Deyunshe statement (with abridged):

"It is decided to suspend the regular performances of all the small theatres (Beijing Deyunshe Theater, Deyunshe Sanlitun Theatre, Zhangyiyuan Tianqiao Teahouse, Guangdelou Theater) from August 9, 2010 (Monday). Check and carry out internal rectification. The specific performance recovery time will be announced separately according to the actual situation."

Many Xiangsheng actors oppose the huge market share of Deyunshe in the Xiangsheng performance industry, they believe that Deyunshe's success has taken away their audience and made their performance despised. They believe that if Deyunshe is defeat, then their show will become very popular. The pressure of Deyun Society was formed under their struggles, and some media began to ban the exhibition of Deyunshe. In addition, the defects of the internal management of Deyun have also surfaced, because of the withdraw of four capable Xiangsheng actors.

=== Reopening ===
In order to solve the problems faced, Deyun took measures from two aspects. First of all, Deyun changed the content of their performances, from some vulgar content to a meaningful performance component, and dealt with some scandals released from Deyun to the society. The second is to establish a modern enterprise management system in Deyun. In other words, Deyun's management improvement from the relationship between mentoring and fraternity is mainly managed by the labor contract employment relationship. In the second decade of the 21st century, the growth of Deyunshe has entered a steady track. It has developed from a commercial performance team to a service company, not only for Xiangsheng performances but also for various business projects.

On the evening of September 12, Deyunshe who had stopped performing self-examination, reopened the door to welcome the audience, Guo Degang led all members of Deyunshe to appear at the Beijing Deyunshe Theater. Up to now, Deyunshe has been in operation for 20 years, and Deyunshe's development has also provided useful experience for commercial crosstalk performance groups.

== Theatres ==
=== Tianqiao theatre ===
Beijing Deyunshe Theater is located in the birthplace of Beijing-style folk art----Tianqiao. It was built from the Tianle Theatre, which was built in 1933. It has a construction area of nearly 1,000 square meters and can accommodate 300 spectators at the same time. The performances of traditional art comics and drums are performed by Deyunshe.

Tianqiao Theater is divided into five parts: cultural square, lobby, auditorium, stage and actor apartment from east to west. The theatre not only has high-tech stage lighting, sound and stage machinery but also has an automation system, security monitoring and comfort. The theatre auditorium is divided into three levels. There are VIP lounges on the first and second floors and a private lounge on the third floor. The third floor is also equipped with a function room for 50 people. It is suitable for small press conferences and receptions, celebrations, ceremony, etc. Most of the theatre's lighting and audio equipment is made in the United States and Germany, suitable for a variety of performance requirements. The third floor of the theatre is a special restaurant for the performance group, and also provides convenience for celebrations, conferences and receptions. The interior of the theatre is divided into three parts: the front hall, the auditorium and the VIP lounge. The lobby is a lobby with a three-story marble building, and the zenith is made of double-layered glass. The auditorium is divided into three floors, with a total of 1215 soft seats and 719 seats. The second floor is a terrace box with 9 boxes and 159 seats. There are 337 seats on the third floor.

=== Zhangyiyuan Tianqiao Teahouse ===
Zhangyiyuan Tianqiao Teahouse is located in the former site of the old Beijing New World Amusement Park and opposite the Oriental Hotel. The geographical position is superior and the transportation is convenient. The overall style is an antique building with an area of about 500 square meters and can accommodate more than 200 people. The interior is decorated in an antique style with traditional culture. While enjoying tea and leisure here, people can also enjoy Laotianqiao folklore performances such as storytelling, opera, acrobatics and Xiangsheng. Every weekend, Deyunshe will perform Xiangsheng here.

=== Sanlitun Theatre ===
The Sanlitun Theater was formed under the influence of the old Tianqiao. It is located in Sanlitun, opposite the Yaxiu Market, and adjacent to Sanlitun SOHO in the east, with a business area of 6,000 square meters

The first-floor design: the theatre adopts Ming and Qing architectural styles, blue brick paving, surrounded by carved beams and high hanging antique lanterns.

The second-floor design: there are nine private rooms on the second floor. The nine private rooms are designed according to the old Beijing's forty-nine city gates. The blue bricks and slabs on the city gates are designed and built, and the eaves are explored. Nine gates corresponding to nine private rooms, each representing different meanings.

== Works ==
Deyunshe's Xiangsheng works are based on sensitive and controversial social issues, such as cruel competition in the job market, rising unemployment and intellectual property. The following are several masterpieces of Deyunshe:

=== Wo Shi Hei She Hui ===
"Wo Shi Hei She Hui" is one of the representative works of the "I" series of the cross talk series of Deyunhse. In the performance, Guo Degang shaped himself into a small person, and all kinds of unreliable things happened to him and he organised a team of laid-off workers and disabled people to perform this work. This work reflects gang violence and crime in society.

=== Wo Yao Nao Fei Wen ===
This work reflects piracy and intellectual property infringement in contemporary Chinese academic and cultural circles.

=== Wo Yao Shang Chun Wan ===
In this work, the performer Guo Degang exposed the increasingly exacerbate employment situation and "hidden rules" in the entertainment industry. The actors commented on the fierce competition in the Chinese job market through comedy

== Main members ==
=== Key actors ===
- Guo Degang (class owner); Guo Degang followed the Tianjin storytelling artist Gao Xiangkai at the age of seven to study traditional storytelling. In 1981, he began to learn Xiangsheng, and established Deyunshe in 1995.
- Yu Qian; In 2000, he began to perform Xiangsheng with Guo Degang, and became the fixed partner of Guo Degang.
- Yue Yunpeng; In 2004, Yue Yunpeng followed Guo Degang as a teacher.
- Sun Yue; partner of Yue Yunpeng.
- Hou Zhen
- Yang Jinming

=== Performance team 1 ===
Loan Yunping (Captain), Gao Feng, Deng Deyong, Zhai Guoqiang, Liu Hechun, Guan Hebai, Wang Haoyue, Li Haoyang, Gao Xiaobei, Hou Xiaolou, Lang Haochen, Zhang Jiulin, Han Jiuming, Wang Bihui

=== Performance Team 2 ===
Li Hedong (Captain), Xie Jin, Jin Helan, Zhu Hesong, Shang Xiaoju, Sun Zizhao, Sun Hebao, Zhang Jinshan, Chen Jiufu, Wu Hechen, Zhang Hejian, Zheng Jiulian, Zhang Shaowei, Kong Zhijie

=== Performance Team 3 ===
Kong Yunlong (Captain), Li Yunjie, Tao Yunsheng, Yu Xiaohuai, Zheng Hao, Ni Jiutao, Liu Heqing, Li Xiaoqiao, Yu Hezhen, Chen Xiaohua, Zhang Hejun, Wang Lei, Xu Guang, Zhao Nan, Wang Xiaoge

=== Performance Team 4 ===
Yan Hexiang (Captain), Guo Qilin, Feng Zhaoyang, Yang Hetong, Li Yuntian, Shi Aidong, Yang Heling, Zhang Xiaoting, Wang Xiaoyi, Chen Jiuping, Zhao Yunxia, Wu Xiaoze, Liu Helong, Fan Xiaoqi, Zhang Hewen, Zhuang Zijian

=== Performance Team 5 ===
Zhu Yunfeng (Captain), Cao Heyang, Zhang Jiuling, Wang Jiulong, Liu Jiuru, Lv Shuo, Liu Chunshan, Liu Zhe, Yang Xiaoze, Xiao Xiaoyu, Zhang Xiaomo, Liu Xiaohang, Dong Xiaoyuan, Yang Xiaotai, Ding Kaigang, Li Hongyi, Ma Xiaosheng, Gao Lei, Liu Jiusi, Zhang Heqing, Liu Hean

=== Performance Team 6 ===
Zhang Helun (Captain), Lang Heyan, Zhang Jiunan, Gao Jiucheng, Li Hebiao, Li Jiujiang, Guan Jiuhai, Zhang Xiaobai, Cao Jiutai, Chen Fengqing, Li Jiuchong, Li Xiaokui, Fan Xiaotang, Zhang Boshuai, Zhang Yuhang, Chang Long, Ge Xiaoqing

=== Performance Team 7 ===
Meng Hetang (Captain), Zhou Jiuliang, Qin Xiaoxian, He Jiuhua, Liu Xiaoting, Zhang Jiutai, Sun Jiufang, Ma Xiaorong, Shang Jiuxi, Guo Xiaohan, Song Haoran, Sun Jiuxiang, Xiao Long, Ji Xiaotong, Qu Qu, Jin Xu

=== Performance Team 8 ===
Zhang Yunlei (Captain), Yang Jiulang, Zhang Hefan, Li Siming, Ji Hewu, Wang Hejiang, Guo Gai, Guo Di, Li Jiuchun, Han Hexiao, Gao Hepeng, Sun Xiaoyao, Dong Jiuli, Li Jiutian, Li Helin, Liang Hekun, Dong Jiuhan

=== Performance Team 9 ===
Zhang Jiuling (Captain), Wang Jiulong,
