= The Faces of My Gene =

- Chinese: 祖宗十九代
- Hanyu Pinyin: Zǔzōng Shíjiǔdaì
- Directed by: Guo Degang
- Written by: Guo Degang; Wall Fish
- Produced by: Hu Lifu; Wang Hui; Zhao Yifang
- Starring: Yue Yunpeng; Lin Chi-ling
- Cinematography: Danny Chan
- Edited by: Zhu Shuzan
- Music by: Nathan Wong
- Production companies: Beijing A Film Co., Ltd. Huace Pictures; Beijing Deyunshe Culture Diffusion Co., Ltd.
- Distributed by: Huaxia Film Distribution Co., Ltd; Huace Pictures (Tianjin) Co., Ltd; Beijing A Film Co., Ltd.
- Release date: 16 February 2018 (China)
- Running time: 95 minutes
- Country: China
- Language: Mandarin
- Box office: $26.80 million

The Faces of My Gene (Chinese: 祖宗十九代) is a 2018 Chinese fantasy adventure comedy film co-written and directed by Guo Degang and starring Yue Yunpeng and Lin Chi-ling. The film premiered in China on 16 February 2018. The film recounts the story of a writer and his ancestors after he crosses ancient times.

== Plot ==
Bei Xiaobei is a self abased writer because he feels himself too fat. Because of his poor appearance, he often ran into a wall in real life. Later, he unwittingly finds a long dusty family tree. And accidentally crosses through the ages to meet with his ancestors.

== Cast ==
- Yue Yunpeng as Bei Xiaobei, a writer
- Lin Chi-ling as Liya, Bei Xiaobei's love interest
- Wu Xiubo as Mei Qiantu
- Wu Jing as Mei Banfa, a Ming dynasty swordsman
- Wang Baoqiang as Erdangjia
- Dong Chengpeng as Xiao Zhuge
- Sandra Ng as Nüwa, Bei Xiaobei's mother
- Eddy Ou as Mei Xingfu, a professor during the Republic of China
- Du Chun as Mei Xiwang, a Qing dynasty scholar
- Zhang Guoli as Doctor Bei, Bei Xiaobei's father
- Ma Su as Lily, a singer
- Zhang Li as Zi An
- Yu Qian as Feng Jiuye
- Guo Qilin as Wang Baobao, Mei Banfa's junior fellow apprentice.
- Fan Bingbing as Bei Xiaobei's ancestor
- Guo Degang as Bei Xiaobei's ancestor
- Jing Boran as Lei, a writer
- Li Chen as Zhang Baishun, a Jin dynasty imperial physician
- Zheng Kai as Lei's broker
- Jia Nailiang as Wang Xiao'er, a martial artist
- Jam Hsiao as Gonggong
- Wu Yue as Kuafu
- Jiro Wang as Zhurong
- Huang Lei as the boss of the publishing house
- Sean Sun as the host
- Jia Ling as a woman
- Evonne Hsieh as Mei Qiantu's wife
- Meng Fei
- Xie Nan as the female reporter
- Wang Xiaoli as Shennong
- Chang Chen-kuang as Zi An's father
- Liu Bei as Tong Tiechui
- Sun Yue as the Emperor's uncle
- Hu Shanshan as Wang Gangtie, Mei Xingfu's fiancée

== Soundtrack ==
No.	Title	Lyrics	Music	Singer(s)	Length
1.	"Song of Position in the Family Hierarchy (辈分歌)" (Propaganda song)	Wu Songjin/Zhao Yingjun	Feng Cong	Guo Degang/Yue Yunpeng/Guo Qilin/Zhang Yunlei
2.	"Is It Important To Be Beautiful (漂亮重要吗)" (Theme song)	Ren Yingjie/Li Ruoxi	Wang Zongxian/Xiachuan Heji	Yue Yunpeng/Guo Qilin

== Production ==
The Faces of My Gene is the comedian-turned director Guo Degang's directorial debut.

A total of 33 celebrities joined the cast during filming, including Wu Xiubo, Wu Jing, Wang Baoqiang, Fan Bingbing, Sandra Ng, Zhang Guoli, and Ma Su.

== Release ==
The film was released on February 16, 2018 in China.

The film received mainly negative reviews.

== Box office ==
The Faces of My Gene collected more than 100 million yuan on its opening weekend.
