= Form-versus-content humour =

Humour category

Form-versus-content humour is a type of humour in an incongruity between a statement's content and the way it is communicated makes it humorous. It is one of the basic techniques of tragicomic humour. Form-versus-content humour can be delivered, for example, by presenting a message in a form that inherently defeats the ostensible purpose of the message, or in a form that is fundamentally incapable of carrying the important part of the message. The Jargon File gives an example of this type of humor: a red index card with GREEN written on it.

== See also ==
- Indirect self-reference
- Ceci n'est pas une pipe
