= Just Another Pandora's Box =

2010 Hong Kong film by Jeffrey Lau

- Film poster

Chinese name
- Traditional Chinese: 越光寶盒
- Simplified Chinese: 越光宝盒
Transcriptions
Standard Mandarin
- Hanyu Pinyin: Yuèguāng Bǎohé
Yue: Cantonese
- Jyutping: Jyut6-gwong1 Bou2-hap6
- Directed by: Jeffrey Lau
- Written by: Jeffrey Lau
- Produced by: Julia Chu; Xu Jianping; Jessica Kam-Engle; Li Li; Liao Qianshan; Yang Yang
- Starring: Ronald Cheng; Gigi Leung; Betty Sun; Athena Chu; Eric Tsang; Huang Bo; Guo Degang; Gillian Chung; Patrick Tam; Wu Jing
- Cinematography: Edmond Fung
- Edited by: Marco Mak
- Music by: Mark Lui
- Production companies: Beijing Bona Cultural Exchange Co., Ltd., Beijing Galloping Horse Film & TV Production, Pearl River Film Co., Ltd., Beijing Galloping Horse Film Co., Ltd.
- Distributed by: Mei Ah Entertainment
- Release date: 18 March 2010
- Running time: 92 minutes
- Country: Hong Kong
- Language: Cantonese

Just Another Pandora's Box, also known as Once Upon a Chinese Classic, is a 2010 Hong Kong parody film directed by Jeffrey Lau, starring Ronald Cheng, Gigi Leung, Betty Sun, Eric Tsang, Huang Bo, Guo Degang, Gillian Chung, and Patrick Tam. It is a spiritual successor to Lau's two-part 1995 film A Chinese Odyssey. Athena Chu, who starred in A Chinese Odyssey, makes a guest appearance in Just Another Pandora's Box.

The film's Chinese title is a pun on the Chinese title of the first part of A Chinese Odyssey, Yuè Guāng Bǎo Hé (月光寶盒). The last three characters of each title are the same, only the first differs; the pronunciations of 月 and 越 are the same in both Cantonese (jyut^{6}) and Mandarin (yuè). The older title translates literally to "Moonlight Treasure Box"; in the title of this film, the character for "moon" is replaced by 越, in this context meaning "more" or "surpassing".

In addition to A Chinese Odyssey, the film spoofs Red Cliff and also makes references to other films such as The Eagle Shooting Heroes, Kung Fu Hustle, House of Flying Daggers, CJ7, Kung Fu Panda, Titanic, King Kong, The Green Hornet, and The Matrix, as well as events such as the 2008 Summer Olympics.

== Plot ==
Rose Fairy is sailing along the river when she suddenly trips on a rope and falls into the water. The trap is set by the bandit Qingyise, who wants to rob her. He steals the Purple Sword from her and plans to sell it. Just then, Joker (the protagonist in A Chinese Odyssey) appears and makes Qingyise unsheathe the sword by pulling away its scabbard. Rose Fairy regains consciousness and mistakenly thinks it was Qingyise who unsheathed the sword. Since she has made a promise to marry the person who unsheathes the sword, she follows Qingyise wherever he goes, leading to a cat-and-mouse chase between the two of them.

Qingyise and Rose Fairy run into Grandpa Buddha and his assistant, who are chasing Bull King for the Pandora's Box. By accident, Qingyise recites "Prajñāpāramitā" and activates the box, causing him to be transported back in time to the Eastern Han dynasty. He finds himself as Zhao Yun at the Battle of Changban, where he is supposed to save Liu Bei's infant son. While the rescue mission turns out to be successful, Qingyise unwittingly brings Liu Bei's son straight into the enemy camp, right before Cao Cao, who confiscates the Pandora's Box and sends him away. Unable to return to his own time, Qingyise is forced to cooperate with Rose Fairy, who has infiltrated Liu Bei's camp in disguise as an ambassador from Turkestan. The two of them make their escape in the midst of the Battle of Red Cliffs.

== Cast ==
The opening sequence of the film states that Jackie Chan, Stephen Chow, Jet Li, Chow Yun-fat, Maggie Cheung, Zhang Ziyi and Angelina Jolie refused to be in this movie.

=== Main cast ===
Actor / actress	Character(s)	Spoof of
Ronald Cheng	Qingyise / Zhao Yun / Zhang Ziyi's transvestite	Red Cliff, A Chinese Odyssey, Titanic
Betty Sun	Rose Fairy	A Chinese Odyssey, Titanic
Huang Bo	Zhou Yu	Red Cliff
Huang Yi	Xiao Qiao	Red Cliff
Yuen Biao	Liu Bei	Red Cliff
Alex Fong	Guan Yu	Red Cliff
Louis Fan	Zhang Fei	Red Cliff
Guo Degang	Cao Cao	Red Cliff
Eric Tsang	Zhuge Liang	Red Cliff
Jeffrey Lau	Grandpa Buddha	A Chinese Odyssey

=== Special appearances ===
Actor / actress	Character(s)	Spoof of
Gillian Chung	Sun Shangxiang	Red Cliff
Athena Chu	Zixia	A Chinese Odyssey
Gigi Leung	Ambassador of Turkestan	
Stephy Tang	Painted Skin / Ambassador's sister	Painted Skin
Ada Choi	Princess Iron Fan	A Chinese Odyssey, King Kong
Sandra Ng	Cook	
Kenny Bee	Soldier holding Olympic torch	House of Flying Daggers, 2008 Summer Olympics
Bruce Leung	Beast	Kung Fu Hustle
Yuen Wah	Landlord	Kung Fu Hustle
Yuen Qiu	Landlady	Kung Fu Hustle
Yu Rongguang	Gan Xing	Red Cliff
Johnnie Kong	Blindy	A Chinese Odyssey
Tin Kai-Man	Soldier in forest	House of Flying Daggers
Lam Chi-chung	Sunset Warrior	A Chinese Odyssey
Lee Kin-yan	Flower Girl / Pork Chop	A Chinese Odyssey
Guo Tao	Hua Tuo	Red Cliff
Sha Yi	General Qi Yan	Red Cliff
Wang Xuebing	Bull King	A Chinese Odyssey, King Kong
Xu Jiao	Dicky	CJ7

=== Other cast ===
Actor / actress	Character(s)	Spoof of
Yuen Cheung-yan	Beggar	Kung Fu Hustle
Lee Lik-chi	Joker	A Chinese Odyssey, The Green Hornet
Wu Jing	Zhao Yun's subordinate	
Edmond Leung	Wu soldier	
Marco Ngai	Wu soldier	
Ken Wong	Lu Su	Red Cliff
Yu Bin	Injured soldier	
Xu Wanqiu	Nurse	
Marco Mak	Xiahou Dun	Red Cliff
Patrick Tam	Xiahou Yuan	Red Cliff
The Flowers	Cao Cao's soldiers	
Corey Yuen	Cao Cao's general	
Lam Suet	O Sim	Osim massage chair
Xing Yu	Wu soldier	
Chiu Chi-ling	Wu soldier	
Tats Lau	The Boy	Kung Fu Hustle, CJ7, Kung Fu Panda
Wong Cho-lam	Cao Cao's soldier	
Chen Kaishi	Big Mouth Jenny	Kung Fu Hustle
Li Yixiao	Lady Mi	Red Cliff
Zhang Li	Liu Bei's wife	
Ai Mengmeng	Liu Bei's wife	
Li Na	Liu Bei's wife	
Michael Tong	Wu general	
Lin Wai-kin	Cao Cao's official	
Tse Kwan-ho	Agent Smith	The Matrix
Yu Qian	Sign language performer	
Ken Jonk	Cao Cao's soldier	
Charmaine Fong	Cao Cao's soldier	
