= Guo Degang =

Chinese crosstalk comedian and actor (born 1973)

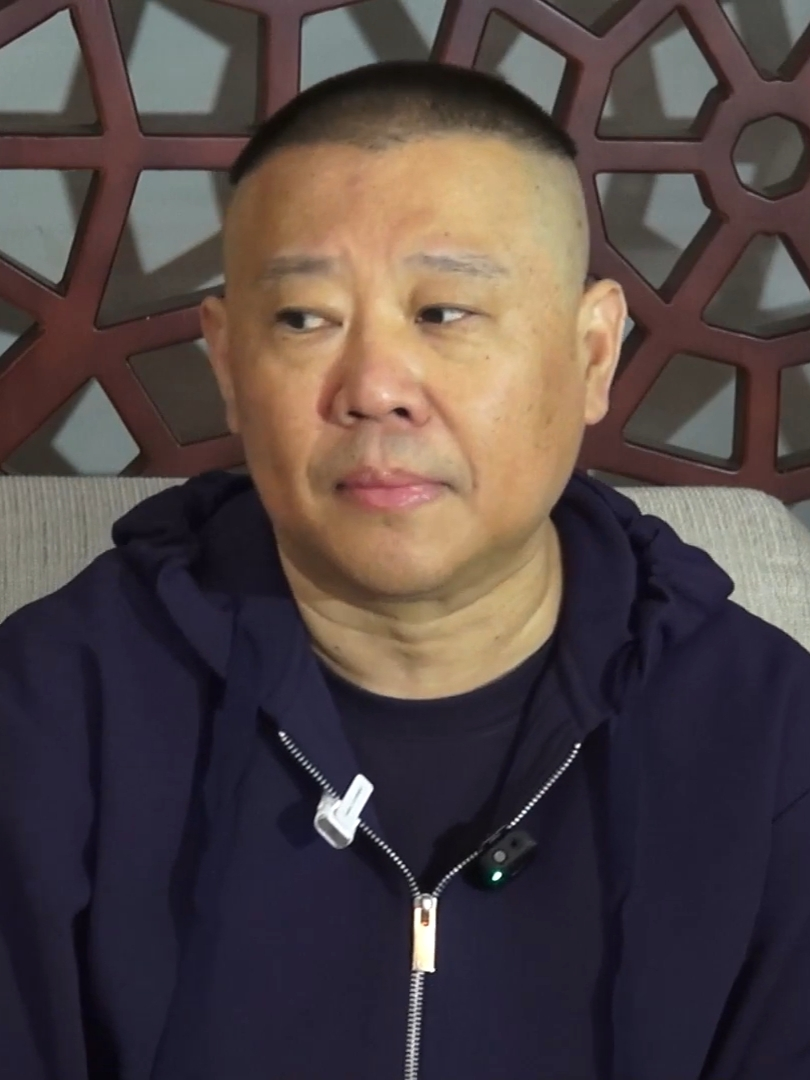
- Guo in 2023
- Born: 18 January 1973 (age 53); Tianjin, China
- Occupation: Crosstalk actor
- Height: 5 ft 6 in (1.68m)
- Spouse: Wang Hui (王惠)
- Children: Guo Qilin (郭麒麟); Guo Fenyang (郭汾瑒)

Chinese name
- Traditional Chinese: 郭德綱
- Simplified Chinese: 郭德纲
Transcriptions
Standard Mandarin
- Hanyu Pinyin: Guō Dégāng
- Website: GuoDedang.org

Guo Degang (Chinese: 郭德纲; pinyin: Guō Dégāng) is a Chinese crosstalk (xiangsheng) comedian and actor. Guo's film appearances include The 601st Phone Call, Just Another Pandora's Box, and Mystery. Guo has also directed the films Our Happiness and The Faces of My Gene.

== Biography ==
Guo Degang was born on January 18, 1973, in Tianjin, China. Guo began his acting studies by studying Pingshu from Gao Qinghai, crosstalk from Chang Baofeng and Hou Yaowen, and opera, including Peking opera, Ping opera, and Hebei Clapper opera. In 1996 Guo founded the crosstalk group "De Yun She" in Beijing, which subsequently collaborated with Zhang Wenshun and Yu Qian in 2000 and Yu Qian, Zhang Yongyong, Wang Shiyong, and Yang Jinming in 2002. In 2005 Guo and other crosstalk actors formed the Deyun Crosstalk Association to raise public awareness of crosstalk. Guo subsequently acted in special crosstalk shows at the PLA Theater and the Tianjin People's Stadium in 2006 and at the Great Hall of the People in 2008. In 2010 Guo hosted the There is a Play Tonight talk show.

In 2011, Guo created a xiangsheng titled Lenin in 1918. The xiangsheng depicts the plight of traditional opera performers who could no longer perform their repertoire during the Cultural Revolution and resort to mixing highlights from the Soviet films Lenin in October and Lenin in 1918 into an aria.

In 2012 he starred in the movie The Unfortunate Car, for which he won The Most Outstanding Asian Artists and 7th Tripod awards for Best Artistic Actor in China. The next year Guo was featured in the CCTV New Year's Gala and hosted the talk show Good Show on Jiangsu Satellite TV. In 2014 Guo starred in Just Another Margin and Mystery and served as an instructor for the Comedy Show television show. The next year he directed and starred in the film Our Happiness and hosted the talk show Gang’s Coming. In 2016 Guo participated in the opening ceremony of “The 20th Anniversary of Deyun Crosstalk Association” and began working as a comedian observer for Top Funny Comedian on Dragon TV. In 2017 Guo directed The Faces of My Gene, which premiered in China on February 16, 2018, grossing $100 million at the box office.

On January 17, 2016, he served as the host of the Dragon TV comedy competition reality show "Happy Comedian Season 2". On April 16, the opening ceremony of the 20th anniversary of the establishment of Deyun Society was held at the Beijing Exhibition Theater.On June 18, he joined the Dragon TV reality show "Boys Over Flowers" On July 17, the comedy reality show "Swordsman Season 3" premiered on Dragon TV. On August 20, Qilin Theatre Company was established at Beijing Sanqingyuan Theatre; on August 31, the genealogy of Deyun Theatre Company was officially announced.

On January 6, 2017, he joined the Dragon TV comedy competition reality show "Happy Comedian Season 3" On January 16, Guo Degang and his son Guo Qilin won the honor of "Weibo's Most Popular Family of the Year" at the 2016 Weibo Night.

On February 25, 2019, the comedy "So Talented" produced by Guo Degang was broadcast on iQiyi.On May 17, the original interactive life experience reality show "Uncle's Restaurant" in which he participated in the recording premiered on Xigua Video

On January 23, 2020, Guo Degang and Deyun Club jointly launched the "Happy Year Every Year" Spring Festival Crosstalk Gala with Tianjin Satellite TV.

In July 2026, during a performance of the Peking opera Ji Gong Living Buddha in Wuhan, Guo improvised by altering the lyrics of the song 弹起我心爱的土琵琶 ("Playing my beloved pipa"). (Note: A red classic from the 1956 film Railway Guerrilla (铁道游击队).) Instead of singing the original line, "微山湖上静悄悄" ("All is quiet on Weishan Lake"), he substituted it with "紫禁城中静悄悄" ("All is quiet in the Forbidden City") and added humorous phrases.

On August 11, 2026, the Wuhan Municipal Bureau of Culture and Tourism stated that while the performance held a valid permit, the unapproved lyrical alteration violated national Regulations on the Administration of Commercial Performances and initiated a formal investigation. Altering established patriotic songs can be prosecuted under Chinese authorities' campaign against historical nihilism. Consequently, an upcoming performance by the affiliated Qilin Theatre Company in Xi’an was canceled.

== Personal life ==
Guo has a son, Guo Qilin (郭麒麟), with his first wife, Hu Zhonghui (胡中惠), in 1996. After receiving a divorce, Guo remarried his current wife Wang Hui (王惠), with whom he had a second son on January 5, 2015.

== Filmography ==
=== Film ===
- The 601st Phone Call (2006)
- Getting Home (2007)
- The Founding of a Republic (2009)
- Mars Baby (2009)
- Eaters (2009)
- Just Another Pandora's Box (2010)
- The Love of Three Smile: Scholar and the Beauty (2010)
- The Warring States (2011)
- Marry a Perfect Man (2012)
- The Unfortunate Car (2012)
- Just Another Margin (2014)
- Mystery (2014)
- Revenge for Love (2017)
- Top Funny Comedian: The Movie (2017)
- The Faces of My Gene (2018)

=== Television ===
- Dreaming Tang Dynasty (2012)
- Great Family 1912 (2012)
- King Rouge (2013)

== Awards ==
=== As host ===
Year	Award		Award-winning Works	
Year	Chinese	English	Chinese	English
2011	《新周刊》2011中国电视榜	New weekly - 2011 China TV list	《非常了得》、《今夜有戏》	Fei De Will Watch; There is a Play Tonight

=== As actor ===
Year	Award		Award-winning Works	
Year	Chinese	English	Chinese	English
2006	2006时尚先生年度颁奖典礼“年度最具人气艺人”奖	2006 Esquire Awards Ceremony - the Most Popular Entertainer of the Year		
2011	第五届真维斯娱乐大典-娱乐现场年度最具影响力娱乐人物	5th Jeanswest Entertainment Awards - live entertainment's Most Influential Entertainer of the Year		
2012	第七届 华鼎奖-中国最佳曲艺男演员奖	The 7th Tripod Award - Best Chinese Opera Actor		
2012	亚洲最杰出艺人奖	Most Outstanding Asian Artists		
2013	最佳新人奖	Best New Artist	《败家子》	Black Sheep
2015	新浪娱乐15周年庆典个人成就奖	Sina Entertainment 15th Anniversary Celebration - Individual Achievement award		
2016	“年轻的选择”2016优酷盛典年度喜剧弄潮儿奖	2016 Young Choice Youku Grand Ceremony - Comedian of the Year		
2016	“年轻的选择”2016优酷盛典终极选择奖	2016 Young Choice Youku Grand Ceremony - Ultimate Choice Award		
2017	2017今日头条年度娱乐人物	2017 Toutiao - Entertainer of the Year		
