= Great Wheel (disambiguation) =

The Great Wheel was a 94-metre (308 ft) Ferris wheel built for the Empire of India Exhibition at Earls Court in London in 1895.

Great Wheel may also refer to:

- Great Wheel Corporation, a company specialising in Ferris wheels
- Seattle Great Wheel, a Ferris wheel erected in 2012
- Grande Roue de Paris, a Ferris wheel erected in 1900

== Ferris wheels that were proposed but never built ==
- Beijing Great Wheel (China)
- Great Berlin Wheel (Germany)
- Great Dubai Wheel (UAE)
- Great Orlando Wheel (US)

== Fiction ==
- Great Wheel cosmology, a concept in the Dungeons & Dragons game
- The Great Wheel, a children's book by Robert Lawson

== See also ==
- Giant Wheel (disambiguation)
