= Florian Bollen =

German businessman (born 1965)

- Born: Andreas Franz Ansgar Bollen; 1965 (age 60–61); Germany
- Education: University of California; Azusa Pacific University
- Occupations: businessman, media executive

Chairman of Great Wheel Corporation
- In office 2004–2009

Andreas Franz Ansgar Bollen (born July 1965), known professionally as Florian Bollen, is a German businessman and former chairman of Great Wheel Corporation. He is a suspect in the Berlin Public Prosecutor's Office investigation into the embezzlement of millions from the closed Global View real estate fund earmarked for the construction of the Great Berlin Wheel near the Berlin Zoological Garden. Bollen is also accused of business ties with Yanukovych's "chief financier", pro-Russian oligarch Serhiy Kurchenko, who is under EU, United States, United Kingdom and Ukrainian sanctions.

== Biography ==
He was born in July 1965 in Germany.

=== Education ===
Florian Bollen lived in Los Angeles from 1989 to 1992, where he worked for an entertainment finance group. He holds an MBA from the University of California and the Azusa Pacific University.

=== Career ===
Florian Bollen has worked in various positions in the international media industry since 1990. After completing his education, Florian Bollen worked for four years at the Bertelsmann Group. As Head of Feature Programmes, he was responsible for rights management and procurement for the German pay-TV channel Premiere. During this period, he participated in merger negotiations and due diligence amid the Bertelsmann/Kirch Pay TV rivalry, a high profile corporate conflict in 1990s German media.

Later, Bollen set up and managed the central purchasing unit for MTG Media Group, based in London. Bollen was also responsible for creating Scandinavia's largest internet entertainment portal and for forging strategic alliances for TV and internet development between MTG, Sony/Columbia and Disney.

From 2000 to 2002 he was Chief Executive Officer of Internationalmedia AG, a film production company responsible for financing and producing several internationally distributed films, including Nurse Betty (2000) directed by Neil LaBute, Enigma (2001) directed by Michael Apted, The Wedding Planner (2001) directed by Adam Shankman, K-PAX (2001) directed by Iain Softley, Iris (2001) directed by Richard Eyre, and Terminator 3: Rise of Machines (2003) directed by Jonathan Mostow.

In 2002, Bollen co-developed the Deepwater Container Terminal (DCT), Poland's container port, alongside Robert Synclair. The project was constructed by Hochtief and financed by Macquarie Group.

He was Chairman of Great Wheel Corporation, which operated Ferris wheels in the United Kingdom and Singapore.

Since 2016, Bollen has advised German Kraft, a brewery and hospitality group operating urban craft beer gardens in Europe. Projects include MM Elephant & Castle, Kraft Brixton (sold Kraft Dalston in 2024) in London; Gleis and Garten in Vienna; and Thaler See Garten in Graz.

== Controversy ==
=== Investor losses ===
Under the management of Florian Bollen, around 1,000 German private investors participated in the Singapore Flyer project. In 2008, amid the global financial crisis, banks began withdrawing support for the investment vehicles that had been established to fund the project. As a result, they required an early exit from the investment structure, leading to investors receiving around 60% of their original investment.

Frankfurt-based Delbrück Bethmann Maffei, a subsidiary of Dutch ABN AMRO, was involved in the deals. According to its data, around 1,000 private investors took part with amounts of 20,000 euros or more. A total of €53 million was raised in this way, a good third of the total investment of €135 million. The rest of the money also came from Germany via HypoVereinsbank (HVB).

=== Singapore Flyer accident ===
In 2008, while Florian Bollen served as the Chairman of the Great Wheel Corporation, an accident occurred on the Singapore Flyer's control panel, allegedly caused by a design flaw attributed to Mitsubishi Heavy industries. The incident triggered a six-hour stoppage, leaving 173 passengers stuck for several hours.

Following five years of arbitration, Mitsubishi was found liable for gross negligence and ordered to pay $41 million in damages to Singapore Flyer Ltd. to compensate for losses caused by the faulty design.

Bollen intervened to resolve the crisis, overseeing the installation of two additional backup drive and control systems as mandated by Singaporean authorities. The repairs were completed within four weeks, allowing the Flyer to resume operations on 26 January 2009 after an inspection flight by then-Prime Minister Lee Kuan Yew, meeting the deadline for Chinese New Year celebrations.

The 2008–09 financial crisis led to the collapse of primary investor ABN AMRO, which defaulted on funding commitments. In May 2009, Great Wheel Corporation sold the Singapore Flyer and terminated projects in Berlin, Beijing, and Orlando. Private investors received a 60% settlement.

=== Suspicion of embezzlement of millions for the construction of the Great Berlin Wheel ===
In 2010, the Berlin Public Prosecutor's Office investigated three executives linked to the Great Wheel Corporation group over alleged embezzlement of investor funds from the Global View real estate fund, intended for the Berlin Great Wheel project. The probe, prompted by a criminal complaint, focused on suspicious transfers totaling over €3 million to offshore entities via fictitious contracts. No evidence of legitimate remuneration was found. The investigation concluded in 2015 without publicized charges.

=== Business ties with EU-sanctioned Kurchenko ===
In 2023, Der Standard reported that Florian Bollen’s ownership of a Ukrainian restaurant chain raised questions due to its prior links to offshore companies associated with sanctioned oligarch Serhiy Kurchenko. Bollen denied any contact or business ties with Kurchenko, calling the speculation unfounded. The newspaper later received a cease-and-desist letter challenging the claims.
