= Jasmine Sokko =

Singaporean singer-songwriter (born 1995)

Jasmine Sokko 楚晴
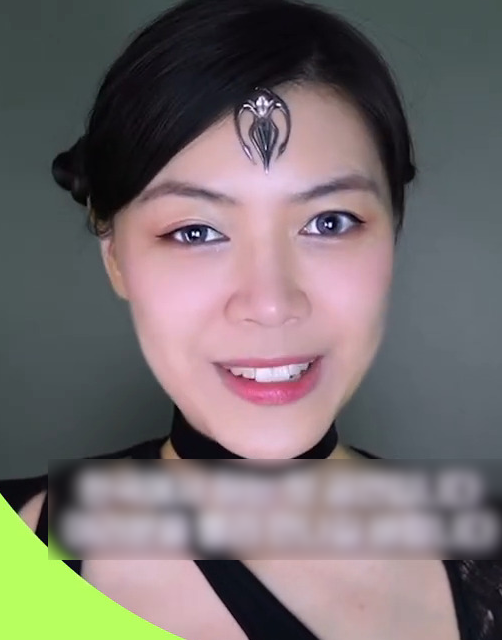
- Jasmine Sokko, in a greeting video made for ROUND Festival, on 1 July 2024

Background information
- Born: Jasmine Wong Chu Qing; 8 November 1995 (age 31); Singapore
- Education: St Andrew's Junior College; Singapore Management University
- Genres: Electronic; pop; Mandopop; rock
- Occupations: Singer; songwriter
- Years active: 2016–present
- Label: JFJ Productions
- Website: www.jasminesokko.com

Jasmine Wong Chu Qing (Note: Chinese given name: 楚晴; pinyin: Chǔqíng) (born 8 November 1995), known professionally as Jasmine Sokko, is a Singaporean singer-songwriter and electronic music producer. She is known for songs such as "Tired" (2019), "Burnout Dynasty" (2025), and "You'll Be Okay" (2026) and performances such as in Rave Now in 2018. Sokko was one of the most-streamed Singaporean female singers on Spotify in 2018, and won the Best Southeast Asian Act at the MTV Europe Music Awards in 2019.

Sokko uses instruments such as the ROLI Seaboard, and software such as TouchDesigner, and prefers putting a bigger focus on her vocals over her instruments. Sokko predominantly writes in the electropop genre. Rising from an unintentional directorial decision in her 2016 debut of "1057", Sokko used visors or masks to conceal parts of her face while performing. She revealed her face on Instagram in 2023. She employs black clothes, eyewear, and wings to create an identity, described as "dark" and "futuristic" by Hidayah Idris of Cleo.

Following her 2018 performance on Rave Now in which she placed fourth, she gained 65,000 new followers on Weibo in six weeks. Kendra Tan of 8days and Eddino Abdul Hadi of The Straits Times cited Rave Now as a reason for her fame. After, she started creating Mandopop songs, such as in the extended play titled Made in Future (2020), but started creating less Mandopop from 2021, desiring to stand out and diversify her music.

In 2019, Sokko released "Tired", described as her breakthrough role according to Melissa Stewart of Channel NewsAsia and Terence Poh of T Singapore, having accumulated 11.7 million streams on Spotify by 2024. In 2025, Sokko released "Burnout Dynasty", winning for the Best Visual Effects at the 2026 Berlin Music Video Awards. In 2026, Sokko released "You'll Be Okay" for the National Day Parade, and aerially performed amidst a drone show at the National Stadium.

== Early life ==
Jasmine Wong Chu Qing was born on 8 November 1995. Her stage name is derived from Finnish sokko, meaning "blind", which she described as apt for her masked persona. She has an older brother.

From a young age, Sokko had wishes of becoming a rock star and held an interest in music, wanting to be "cool", which she later described as a shallow reason. In a pursuit, she had participated in a rock band as the bassist and vocalist. She did not excel in the bass, and had a poor rhythmic sense. Sokko was made to learn the piano at a young age, but never excelled at it. Out of rebellion, at 13 years old, she bought a guitar with her own savings, and taught herself how to play.

Having moved around a lot and spending time alone while her parents worked, she anchored herself with music. She spent a few years growing up in Malaysia.

Sokko describes herself as an "average student" who never fit in societally, because of her different interests such as in museums and libraries. She attended Compassvale Primary School (Note: Sokko, Jasmine; JFJ Productions (22 July 2026). Jasmine Sokko 楚晴 - NDP2026: You'll Be Okay 幕后花絮 Official Behind The Scenes. Event occurs at 0:24 – via YouTube. "That's actually my primary school, Compassvale Primary School." Alt URL) and St Andrew's Junior College. To satisfy her parents, she reluctantly studied business management at the Singapore Management University (SMU), but accepted the situation after studying for a year. She took a semester off to work on her music. Sokko was awarded the SMU Emerging Artist Award, which recognised its undergraduates for their past artistic works and involvement in the arts and cultural community.

From August 2018, she was part of a six-month student exchange programme to Stockholm, motivated by Swedish culture where songwriting was normalised and culturally supported. Sokko described it as the last chance for her music career, sending cold emails over months to find a music collaborator and eventually receiving an invitation to Rave Now. She did not pass her exchange programme.

== Persona ==
Sokko wore masks to conceal parts of her face while performing, as she wanted people to focus more on her music than her appearance. The masks were custom-made or sourced by Randolph Tan, her stylist. Apart from masks, she also used visors and fans. According to Geoffrey Eu of The Business Times, her use of masks was a compromise for her introverted nature, but was also a way to start conversations among listeners. Her persona influences her music and fashion, and is a method of escapism and an extension of her personality, according to Sokko. The use of masks was an unintentional decision; a mask was worn in her first music video, "1057", for its plot of a girl finding someone lost, who ended up to be her masked self. She continued wearing it after a directorial suggestion to omit removing the mask at the conclusion of the video for mystery and an "open-ended" effect.

Sokko was inspired by mask-wearing artists like Zhu and DeadMau5. She compared her stage persona to Dan Brown's Robert Langdon from The Da Vinci Code, saying that both stage personae are "fictional" but an idolisation of who they want to be. In July 2023, Sokko revealed her face on Instagram, after deciding that her mask did not matter much and no longer served its purpose, having gained confidence in her music. The mask had been shrinking in size over the years, and her stage identity and personal identity had become increasingly merged. After, Sokko started wearing large wings and eyewear, as a replacement for the mask.

Sokko only wears black clothes, enjoying designers that work with black like Yohji Yamamoto and Comme des Garçons. She later drew inspiration from brands like Mugler, Rick Owens and Dion Lee, described as "edgy" by Hashirin Nurin Hashimi of Tatler Asia. She describes black as consistent and evoking strength and mystery, being apt for her personality as black is ubiquitous and ignored. Hidayah Idris of Cleo describes her style as "dark" and "futuristic", Eddino Abdul Hadi of The Straits Times described her image as "cyberpunk-inspired", and Eu described her atmosphere as "edgy" and "alluring".

== Career ==
=== Background ===
Sokko was inspired to create her music after finding it hard to connect with the sexual and narcotic content of the songs she mainly listened to. Sokko was also inspired by musicians like Julia Michaels and Grimes. She educated herself on various aspects of music creation, such as production, composition, and marketing. Having found learning from textbooks and YouTube videos ineffective at 19 years old, she opted to learn by direct usage.

Sokko grew up with rock music, but felt that her voice was too "thin" for it. She pursued electronic music after listening to Skrillex and Kygo, realising that they did not sing, and reframed her perspective on music. Sokko felt that electronic music was promising for the future, seeing it as a technological advancement befitting as a medium for her songs.

As singing was an unorthodox career in Singapore, Sokko's parents did not support her singing career until 2018. They asked her to focus on school and treat singing as a hobby, preferring that she instead have a "stable job", and were only convinced after she signed with Warner Music Singapore and showed using an Excel sheet that singing was financially viable.

=== Style ===
Sokko sings, writes, and produces her own music, in the genre of electropop, which Hidayah Idris of Cleo describes as "melancholic". She describes her songs as "sad", "angry" and about facing "resistance", as a musical outlet to explore her insecurities and express dislike towards feeling stifled in Singapore's pragmatic society, personifying herself, hoping that Singapore will grow to accept people with unorthodox goals. For juxtaposition, Sokko pairs the darker themes with "fun" music. She draws inspiration from her surroundings, writes short ideas in a notebook, and notes down melodies by recording using her phone.

Sokko enjoys experimenting with music and deviating from what she is known for, which she cites as a factor of success. She hopes to empower the younger generation to pursue unrealistic dreams and not worry about being a social outcast, and women to pursue things regardless of societal expectations. She also hopes that her songs allow people to think deeper about things and connect people globally.

Sokko uses instruments like the ROLI Seaboard, a keyboard-style MIDI controller. She prefers to lean more into her vocals, unlike other electronic music producers who lean into their instruments. Sokko uses hardware like Tap, a wearable computer keyboard, and TouchDesigner for remixing. Sokko also uses physical motion to modulate music. Although she uses tools such as Claude, she does not use artificial intelligence to make music, preferring to enjoy the creative process of music creation.

=== Chinese expansion ===
Sokko expanded her career into China to be more culturally in-touch with her ancestry, making music in Mandarin. After expanding into China, she became more cognisant to the depth and poeticalness of Chinese songs. Her time in China taught her discipline in social media and spend more time on music creation, due to a poor internet reception, and the importance of visuals during performance. In September 2019, (Note: Warner Music Singapore (5 September 2019). 楚晴 Jasmine Sokko - 噓 SHH (Official Music Video) (Video) – via YouTube. Alt URL) Sokko debuted in the Chinese music industry with the Mandarin song "Shh". (Note: Also stylised as "SHH" (Chinese: 噓; pinyin: xū).) To produce the song, she revised her Mandarin after having neglected it, reconnecting with her secondary school Chinese teacher, after having found textbooks and YouTube videos ineffective.

Sokko joined Rave Now, a Chinese electronic music competition which premiered in December 2018, after the producers reached out to her. Sokko kept her participation secret from her parents, neglecting her studies during the student exchange in Stockholm; after her parents found out through the news and the event ended, she apologised. Sokko held an interest in joining Rave Now due to its focus on electronic music producers, and had curiosity about China due to its inaccessibility from outside the nation. She wanted to break in to the Chinese market where electronic music was relatively new, and received greater feedback compared to Singapore. She placed fourth in Rave Now as the only Singaporean. The Chinese audience described her performance as "exotic". She performed Chinese covers, and her own songs such as "1057" and "#0000FF" with Chinese lyrics. Within six weeks of airing Rave Now, she gained 65,000 new followers on Weibo.

Kendra Tan of 8days wrote that the competition gave her the motivation and exposure needed to become one of the most streamed Singaporean female artists on Spotify, and Eddino Abdul Hadi of The Straits Times described it as a reason for her fame. Driven by her participation in Rave Now, she released a Chinese language extended play, Made in Future, (Note: simplified Chinese: 新乐园; traditional Chinese: 新樂園; pinyin: Xīn Lè Yuán) consisting of six tracks, on 18 November 2020. It contained "Girls", a song about female empowerment that featured Chinese rapper VaVa, as the focus single.

From 2021, she started creating less bilingual Mandopop songs, saying that it did not make her stand out as much as she wanted, and wanted to strive to create something new instead of keeping to the same formula. In 2026, she said that she did not dismiss Chinese songs yet, citing her bilingual upbringing.

== Releases ==
In September 2016, Sokko made her single debut "1057" in the electronic genre, which she also wrote and produced. Being the word lost written in numbers, it was about losing one's ways in a "number"-obsessed society, such as grades, followers, and money. The song placed first in Spotify's Singapore viral charts when it was released. A writer from the Kaltblut magazine commended the song, describing it as new and unique, standing out from others as a singer, songwriter, and producer.

In September 2017, she released her debut extended play (EP) titled N°, (Note: Pronounced as "no" or "number".) short for Number, after having released songs such as "1057", "#0000FF", "H2O", "2D" and "600D", which contained emotions about resisting society. The song "#0000FF" is named after the colour code for blue, writing about the grief of having a toxic lover. The song was commended by Lay Zhang and Alan Walker during her performance in Rave Now in December 2018; Zhang enjoyed the production and "futuristic" melody.

In 2017, Sokko collaborated with Amanda Ling to remix "Driven", a rock song by Concave Scream, such that it took on a more sombre genre. By 1 August 2018, she was one of the top-streamed Singaporean female singers on Spotify; she attributes that to her activity during an era of digital releases, unlike other Singaporean female singers.

On 24 August 2018, Sokko released the single "Hurt", her first major-label debut on Warner Music Singapore, which she wrote and produced. Inspired by the hurt caused by brutal honesty from loved ones, she directed her held-back emotions of getting revenge into the song. Geoffrey Eu of The Business Times described "Hurt" as a "confessional" about her personal struggles. According to Chris Gillett of the South China Morning Post, many considered it her most mature song. The music video of "Hurt" also made her confront her insecurities, such as doing her nails, wearing heels, and dancing.

In March 2019, she released "Tired", her second major-label work, which was dedicated to introverts. It was her breakthrough role according to Melissa Stewart of Channel NewsAsia and Terence Poh of T Singapore; it has more than 11.7 million streams on Spotify as of 2024. The song wrote about the exhaustion of the insincere people around her, who spoke stereotypically and made themselves look impressive. The music video reflected on Singapore's history and impact on modern Singapore, hoping that Singaporeans cherished their ancestral roots more. Poh wrote that it was a shift from her introspective songs to having made a rebellious cultural commentary with political undertones. In November 2019, Sokko became the first Singaporean music artist to win the award for Best Southeast Asian Act at the MTV Europe Music Awards.

In March 2020, (Note: Warner Music Singapore (20 March 2020). 楚晴 Jasmine Sokko - 退烧 FEVER (Official Lyric Video) (Video) – via YouTube. Alt URL) Sokko released "Fever", (Note: Chinese: 退烧; pinyin: tuì shāo) a Mandarin song about growing up and the regret of not having realised the importance of moments in time, after realising her new-found independence and maturity living in Stockholm. It was the first song she wrote in a team of musicians.

In April 2020, Sokko released "Mess", during the COVID-19 pandemic, written with apt optimism and perseverance much needed by society, according to Hear65. Wenting Ang of Yahoo Life wrote that it was blunt and uplifting, and gave a different perspective to failure. Working with her choreographer to create a simple TikTok dance to combat loneliness, it garnered 2.8 million views for the "#BlessThisMess" dance challenge by June 2020.

In March 2021, Sokko released "Medusa", which she co-wrote and co-produced exclusively through online interactions. Inspired by Medusa from Greek mythology, Sokko described her as a "misunderstood villain" who became a descriptor of controlling women. Through the song, she explored independence and self-renewal, and hoped that listeners would look past appearances, discover the real nature of things and become more authentic. Eu describes the song as a "tonal shift"; Sokko describes her previous songs as more cheerful, compared to "Medusa", which was darker in nature. It was created after trying to distance herself from creating Mandopop music, fearing that it would become repetitive and unoriginal.

In June 2021, Sokko released "Tetris", about breaking away from societal norms with regards to one's identity and building relationships with others, named after the game, Tetris. It was inspired by The Perks of Being a Wallflower, a 2012 film.

In August 2021, Sokko released "Cannibal", described as a "harder-edged pop" by Daniel Peters of NME. It was a collaboration with Rena Lovelis of Hey Violet, a pop band from the United States. She directed her emotions of exhaustion from having an attitude of setting unrealistic expectations and being unable to fulfil them, describing it as "cathartic" as she acknowledged the problem and tried self-love.

In September 2021, Sokko released θi = θr, (Note: Pronounced as "the law of reflection".) an EP with six tracks, including "Medusa", "Tetris", and "Cannibal". It was named after Snell's law, which says that total internal reflection occurs when the angle of incidence is equal to the angle of refraction. Sokko liked the concise formula as it effectively condensed complex information, and was inspired by museums which allowed her to create from observation and reflect emotionally. It also included "25", co-written with Gentle Bones, a Singaporean singer-songwriter, a song about coming of age and being young enough to escape responsibilities but old enough to be an adult.

In February 2022, Sokko released "We Could Be So Electric", (Note: Also stylised as "we could be so electric".) which she describes as having elements of a love song, imagining what meeting a partner might feel like, and not wanting to be restricted to a single genre. It was created when she felt societal pressure to get in a relationship, due to the precedent set by the older generation, but embraced being alone.

In February 2023, Sokko released "Winter", a rock song, returning to her initial desires of performing rock music. Eddino Abdul Hadi of The Straits Times wrote that the production was very different from her previous releases, denoting a new start for Sokko.

In March 2025, Sokko released her first full-length album titled Burnout Dynasty. It consisted of songs that captured the different phases of growing up in Singapore, citing constant pressure to do well, wanting to create a universe and reclaim her sense of self. The music video for "Burnout Dynasty" was inspired by cyberpunk and Asian futurism. The Berlin Music Video Awards wrote that the well-crafted music video was produced with much consideration, and left narrative interpretation to the viewers. It won Best Visual Effects at the 2026 Berlin Music Video Awards.

In May 2026, Sokko composed and sang "You'll Be Okay", an electronic pop song, used in the 2026 celebration of Singapore's National Day Parade (NDP). Sokko was selected by Bang Wenfu, the NDP music director, to be in charge of one of three songs for a wide representation of genres; she deliberately avoided making a pop song.

The song is about having hope for the future and giving courage to people, despite uncertainty being confusing, uneasy, and ubiquitous, quoting the illusioned stability in a pragmatic Singaporean society. To express what Singapore meant to Sokko and how it helped her grow, the music video featured her secondary school friends, her childhood playground and streets, and the ArtScience Museum, liking how it embodied art and technology. Having remembered watching the NDP show at 11 years old, she wanted to deliver the same experience and give courage to the children watching the NDP. It was created when Singaporeans had pre-existing expectations of NDP songs, which Sokko wanted to challenge, wanting to express herself more than pandering to the population.

Heng Mui Cheng wrote to The Straits Times that "You'll Be Okay", along with the two other NDP songs, failed to be memorable and intergenerational unlike older NDP songs. According to Izza Haziqah Abdul Rahman, online users wrote that the songs were harder to sing along to, and did not sound fitting as NDP songs. Jeremy Monteiro, a musician, wrote that despite the songs being harder to sing, it connected well with younger Singaporeans, showing a generational evolution in music taste.

== Performances and features ==
On 29 June 2018, Sokko performed for Kreatif Connections, a festival celebrating 50 years of Indonesia–Singapore relations. In 2020, she performed for Let's Celebrate 2020, a New Year countdown show, at The Promontory@Marina Bay as the headline act. In 2025, she had also performed for JJ Lin in Kuala Lumpur, Malaysia.

On 23, 24, and 26 January 2024, Sokko opened for Coldplay at the National Stadium in Singapore during the Music of the Spheres World Tour for three of its six nights of performances to 55,000 attendees, singing songs such as "Hurt" and "Tired". By 2024, she joined Full Music, a publisher of JFJ Productions by JJ Lin.

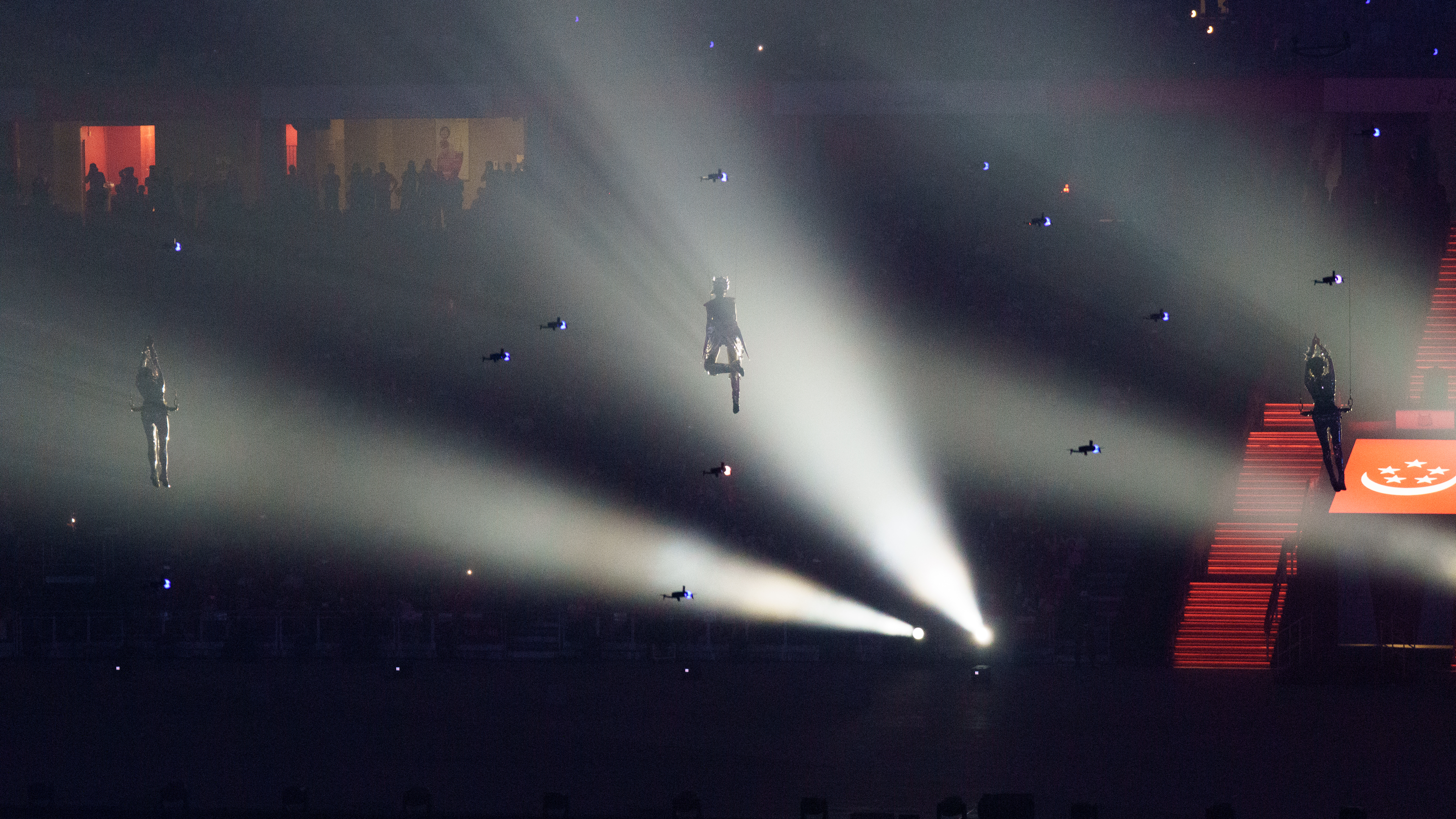
Jasmine Sokko (center) performing to her song "You'll Be Okay" at National Day Parade 2026

On 9 August 2026, Sokko performed "You'll Be Okay" amidst a drone show consisting of 300 drones, descending 30 metres from the ceiling of the National Stadium for the National Day Parade, after about three months of practice sessions.

=== Features ===
Sokko was featured on a billboard in New York City's Times Square from 15 June 2021 to 17 June 2021, as a part of Spotify's "EQUAL" programme, which sought to empower women, among other Singaporean artistes like Kit Chan. It featured songs such as "Tetris" and a remix of "Medusa".

== Personal life ==
Sokko enjoys dressing androgynously using men's fashion, having envied her brother growing up, to reject gender norms and allow women to not be seen for their body figure, but had since grown to appreciate women's fashion as well. She has atychiphobia, a fear of failure. Sokko finds it hard to bond socially due to her unorthodox career path, as others are unable to relate to her.

Besides music, Sokko has indoor interests and describes herself as a "nerd" and curious; she designs props, outfits, and accessories with a 3D printer, sometimes for performance-use, reads books, and plays games like Valorant and Cyberpunk 2077. She likes dystopian films and thriller novels. In 2021, Sokko tried sewing, hoping to create performance clothes for herself, which she stopped after deciding that she did not have an aptitude for it. In 2026, she also tried studying basic electronics engineering. She describes herself as an introvert, and unwinds by meeting up with friends.

== Discography ==
=== Extended plays ===
Date of release	Title	Ref.
21 September 2017	Nº	
18 November 2020	Made In Future	
17 September 2021	θi = θr	

=== Albums ===
Date of release	Title	Ref.
28 March 2025	Burnout Dynasty	

== Awards and nominations ==
Year	Event	Work	Award	Result	Ref.
2019	MTV Europe Music Awards	—N/a	Best Southeast Asian Act	Won	
2026	Berlin Music Video Awards	"Burnout Dynasty"	Best VFX	Won	
