= Rave Now =

Chinese electronic music talent reality show

Chinese name
- Traditional Chinese: 即刻電音
- Simplified Chinese: 即刻电音
- Literal meaning: Instant electronic music
Transcriptions
Standard Mandarin
- Hanyu Pinyin: jí kè diàn yīn
- Genre: Reality, Survival, Competition
- Created by: Tencent
- Directed by: Zhang Li
- Judges: Lay Zhang; Laure Shang; Wowkie Zhang; Alan Walker (guest)
- Country of origin: China
- Original language: Mandarin
- No. of seasons: 1

Original release
- Network: Tencent Video
- Release: 1 December – 8 December 2018

Rave Now (simplified Chinese: 即刻电音; traditional Chinese: 即刻電音; pinyin: jí kè diàn yīn) is a Chinese electronic music talent reality show. The show premiered on Tencent Video on December 1. Lay Zhang, Laure Shang and Wowkie Zhang are the mentor for the show, featuring Alan Walker as the guest mentor. It featured Rocket Girls 101 as guest appearance.

== Mentors ==
Name	Age	Role	Notes
Lay Zhang	27	Mentor	Member of Exo
Laure Shang	35	Mentor	
Wowkie Zhang	35	Mentor	Former Member of The Flowers
Alan Walker	21	Guest Mentor	

== Program Format ==
=== Show background ===
With the rapid increase of electronic music festivals in China, the development of electronic music in China has steadily increased, especially with the accumulation of a large number of electronic music fans. On the other hand, the public's lack of awareness of electronic music, coupled with insufficient cultural accumulation of electronic music, has slowed the development of original electronic music in China. As Tencent Video’s self-produced variety show in the fourth quarter of 2018, Rave Now creativity is an important core of the model. Electronic music is the expression of creative young people. It is the most popular type of music for young people, and young people are also a very creative generation. The launch of "Rave Now" not only showed the creativity of Chinese EDM people, but also made Chinese EDM well known to the public.

=== Show format ===
The program invites outstanding electronic musicians from around the world to participate in the selection and selection, and select a group of outstanding electronic music works and powerful musicians from multiple perspectives such as professional recommendation, live performance, and visual presentation. In terms of the competition system, "Rave Now" adopts a producer competition mode. The program uses the three attitude keywords of "original leader", "wild road" and "weird" to let the players choose their own groups. Among the contestants, in addition to many music lovers, there are also Panta.Q, Dirty Class, Anti-General and other producers who are already well-known in China's domestic electronic voice circle. The program group used subtitles to mark the professional terms such as the type of music performed by the players, the effector used, and the rhythm and drum beats. After the gathering and carnival of the "Electronic Music Port", electronic musicians enter the Holding Room to wait for the unknown test.

Producers experienced cruel and fierce assessments such as breakout battles, team breakout battles, original matchmaking, and the host team show, and finally the top five in the country Jiang Liang, Anti-General, Jasmine, Tao Leran and Xue Bote were born. The top five producers in the country and Qi Yitong & Dong Zilong, who returned smoothly with the advantage of the instant electronic music ranking, entered the finals together. The night of the annual finals adopts a full live broadcast mode. Six groups of producers experienced multiple rounds of competition among Rocket Girls 101 Feat. The champion candidates were determined by the online popularity rankings.

== Program List ==
=== Staging Information ===
Issue 1: Rocket Girl 101 "Faded" bursts open, Zhang Yixing, Da Zhang Wei, Shang Wenjie test the electronic music god	Show Time	2018-12-1
The opening show was performed by the special hosts Alan Walker and Rocket Girl 101, which performed a new interpretation of the "Faded" version of "Instant Electronic Music". Alan Walker's familiar hoodie mask dressing and catchy melody made the audience cheer and cheered along with the rhythm. In the competition session of the first host Zhang Yixing, the appearance of Panta.Q Guo Qu and HusH! Fat Tiger changed the scene into Zhang Yixing's "Alumni Meeting". The most breathtaking moment of the night between the producers and the audience was that Zhang Wei and the "king of electronic music" Wang Yilong were on the same stage. Singer Wang Yilong, who is well-known for the "Thai Divine Comedy" such as "The King of Electronic Music", came to the scene, hoping to rectify his music for many years, but he was not recommended by the host. Anti-general, the "dark leader" of the electronic voice coil, is loved by netizens as "Electronic Music King Xun". This time, he cooperated with rapper Xie Di to board the stage of "Instant Electronic Music". And Anti-general was amazing in the program, saying bluntly that "I didn't want to participate when I heard that Zhang Wei was here." After the unexpected drop (grabbing) on the scene burst and show, he directly challenged Da Zhang Wei and asked the manager to make a sound he had never heard.	Principal	Zhang Yixing, Da Zhangwei, Shang Wenjie, Alan Walker
	Main guest	Rocket Girl 101
	Assess students	Panta.Q Guo Qu, HusH! Fat Tiger, Wang Yilong, Anti-general, Vocal and Electronic Combination, Tao Leran, Dirty Class, etc.
Issue 2: Feng Timo's voice makes Zhang Yixing entangled, and Da Zhangwei is burned to tears by the original Journey to the West, Shang Wenjie has been giggling at the two musicians	Show Time	2018-12-8
The big Zhangwei group, which uses "impatient" as the key word, ushered in "True Fragrant Three Kills" in the second phase. He didn’t say a word and ignored the others, and directly used music to "encourage" Mao Yucheng to conquer the audience, so that Da Zhangwei sent a high evaluation of "the person with the highest musical literacy so far" and invited him to cooperate in subsequent shows, And went on stage to discuss music together. Another "folk" producer Jiang Liang who showed a little "joy" and focused on the daily sounds of life as "samples", the novel and surprising arrangement "Really Happy", made Da Zhang Wei praise "really moving Music can make people forget the (judgment) principle" and the most unexpected "Monkey Talk", the arrangement of the stunning appearance of rich Chinese elements, makes everyone excited. Among them, "Monkey Talk" also captured the love and fans of many netizens after the program was broadcast. At the same time, the Zhang Yixing group, whose keywords are "futuristic", welcomed the producer Tsunano in a pleasant surprise. He is one of the top Chinese artists who have signed an international label." Tsunano's strength remix Wang Leehom's "Gai Shi "Hero", he bowed repeatedly and was very humble when he came to the stage. Unexpectedly, when the music came out, Zhang Yixing’s smile was the best evaluation. Later, he talked about his frequent performances at some electronic music festivals in the Netherlands and Belgium, hoping to try various languages Some new things came out of Chinese. When he learned that he could speak Dutch, Malay and other languages, Zhang Yixing talked with him about M-POP.	Principal	Zhang Yixing, Da Zhangwei, Shang Wenjie
	Assess students	Mao Yucheng, Tsunano, Jiang Liang, Feng Timo, KK Zhang, Zuo Yi, Xue Bote, Meilandi, Qi Yitong, Dong Zilong, etc.
