= Ferris Wheel of Berlin =

Ferris Wheel of Berlin may refer to:

- Great Berlin Wheel, proposed for a site near Berlin Zoological Garden, but never built
- Spreepark Ferris wheel, at the now defunct Spreepark
