= Giant Wheel =

Giant wheel is an alternative name for a large Ferris wheel.

Giant Wheel may also refer to:

== Ferris wheels ==
- Giant Wheel (1982 World's Fair), a 50-metre (164 ft) Vekoma wheel
- Giant Wheel (Cedar Point), a 41.5-metre (136 ft) Anton Schwarzkopf wheel which opened in 1972 at Lake Erie, Sandusky, Ohio, US
- Giant Wheel (Darien Lake), a 50-metre (164 ft) Vekoma wheel
- Giant Wheel (Hersheypark), an Intamin double wheel which operated from 1973 until 2004 at Hershey, Pennsylvania, US
- Giant Wheel (Irvine Spectrum Center), in Irvine, California, US
- Giant Wheel (Morey's Piers), a 47.5-metre (156 ft) Vekoma wheel which opened in 1985 at Wildwood, Cape May County, New Jersey, US
- Giant Wheel (World Carnival), a Ronald Bussink Professional Rides transportable wheel operated by World Carnival, based in Hong Kong
- Vienna Giant Wheel (Wiener Riesenrad), a 64.75-metre (212 ft) wheel built in 1897 in Austria

== Ferris wheel brand names ==
- Giant Wheel, jointly used by Ronald Bussink and Vekoma
- Giant Wheels, used by Fabbri Group

== See also ==
- Giant Sky Wheel, a double wheel which operated from 1961 until 1980 at Cedar Point in Ohio, US
- Giant Star Wheel, a Ferris wheel in Pasay, Metro Manila, Philippines
- Great Wheel (disambiguation)
