= ROLI =

Music production technology company

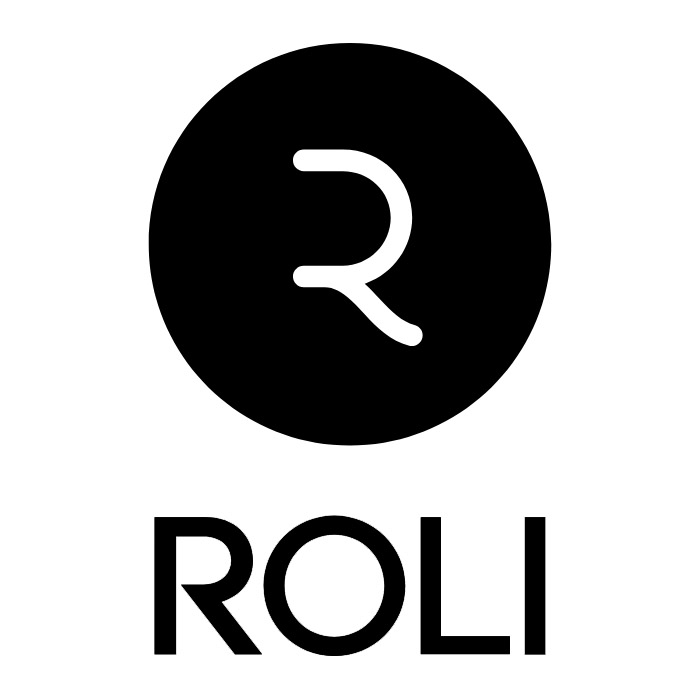
- Company type: Private
- Industry: Music technology
- Founded: 2009; 17 years ago
- Founder: Roland Lamb
- Headquarters: London, England, UK
- Products: ROLI Piano, Airwave, Seaboard
- Website: roli.com

ROLI is a London-based music technology company known for its expressive musical instruments and music education technology. The company is best known for the ROLI Seaboard, a MIDI controller with a soft, continuous silicone surface that allows pitch bending and timbral control through touch. ROLI was founded by musician and entrepreneur Roland Lamb in 2009. Its instruments have been used by musicians including Grimes, A. R. Rahman, and Hans Zimmer.

The company's current flagship is the ROLI Piano System, an AI-powered piano learning platform that combines light-up keyboards with the Airwave hand-tracking device and the ROLI Learn app. The system uses infrared cameras to see the player's hands and conversational AI to respond to voice, providing real-time personalised feedback on technique.

== History ==
Pianist Roland Lamb founded ROLI in 2009 while a graduate student at London's Royal College of Art. His first prototype of the Seaboard was a response to the design limitations of the piano keyboard as a mechanical interface. As a jazz pianist, he wanted to create pitch and timbre effects on a keyboard that are often associated with bowed string and orchestral brass instruments. His concept of a soft, pliable, continuous "keywave surface" was the technological foundation of the Seaboard and the firm's related instruments.

ROLI's Series A fundraising in 2014 raised $12.8 million, followed by a $27 million Series B fundraising in 2016. In April 2017 ROLI raised debt funding from Kreos Capital.

The company is based in Dalston, London. It sells its products in over 40 countries worldwide. It has acquired the following companies: JUCE, FXpansion, and Blend.

In 2017, Pharrell Williams was named Chief Creative Officer and invested in the company. The role was part of the original ROLI Ltd and did not continue after the company's restructuring in 2021.

In April 2020, Roli sold the JUCE product to PACE Anti-Piracy firm.

The company lost money in 2019 and 2020. In September 2021, ROLI Ltd filed for administration. A new company, Luminary Ltd, was formed by Lamb and Chief People Officer Corey Harrower, acquiring ROLI's intellectual property, assets, and approximately 70 staff. Luminary raised £5 million in initial funding led by Hoxton Ventures. The company continued to operate under the ROLI brand.

In 2022, the company launched the Seaboard RISE 2, marking its return to the professional market. The instrument was named one of TIME's Best Inventions of 2022. In November 2023, ROLI reintroduced the Seaboard Block as the Seaboard Block M, a compact MPE controller priced at $350.

In 2024, ROLI rebranded its LUMI product line under the ROLI name, with LUMI Keys becoming ROLI Piano M and the LUMI Music app becoming ROLI Learn. In October 2024, the company launched ROLI Airwave, a computer vision device using infrared cameras to track hand movements above a keyboard in real time.

In January 2025, ROLI unveiled ROLI Piano, a 49-key keyboard with full-size illuminated keys, at the NAMM Show 2025, the company's first NAMM appearance in six years. The combined ecosystem of ROLI Piano, Airwave, and the ROLI Learn app was branded the ROLI Piano System. In February 2026, the company launched AI Music Coach, a piano learning feature using hand tracking and voice interaction, built into the ROLI Learn app.

The ROLI Piano System was named one of TIME's Best Inventions of 2025, received a CES 2026 Innovation Award, and won an iF Design Award in 2026.

== Products ==
=== Seaboard ===
ROLI's first instrument, the Seaboard, is a synthesizer controller based on the piano keyboard. Instead of discrete keys, the Seaboard has a continuous surface of pliable silicone that ROLI calls the "keywave surface." This allows a musician to bend pitch through sideways movements, deepen a sound by pressing into the surface, and manipulate timbre through vertical slides - a system ROLI refers to collectively as "5D Touch."

The Seaboard Grand family went on sale in September 2013, available in 88-, 61-, and 37-keywave configurations. The Grand featured an embedded Equator sound engine developed in collaboration with FXpansion, and made its public debut at the Royal Albert Hall. It later appeared in the film La La Land.

In 2015, ROLI introduced the Seaboard Rise, a more portable USB and Bluetooth MIDI controller available in 25- and 49-keywave sizes. In 2022, the Seaboard Rise 2 followed with a redesigned "fretted" keywave surface, aluminium chassis, and USB-C connectivity. It ships bundled with Equator2, ROLI Studio, and Ableton Live Lite.

In 2023, ROLI announced the Seaboard M, a compact 24-keywave MPE controller with a new MIDI output port, 10+ hours of battery life, and Bluetooth. It began shipping in early 2024.

=== BLOCKS ===
In 2016, ROLI launched BLOCKS, a modular system of portable music controllers. The lineup included the Lightpad Block, a square multitouch pad with pressure-sensitive surface and LED grid; the Seaboard Block, a miniaturised 24-keywave keyboard; and three smaller control modules (Live Block, Loop Block, and Touch Block). The units connected via magnetic "DNA" connectors that transferred power and MIDI data, and were sold through music retailers and Apple Stores.

A revised Lightpad Block M followed in 2017 with improved pressure sensitivity. The Seaboard Block was succeeded by the Seaboard M in 2023, and the remaining blocks were discontinued.

=== LUMI ===
In 2019, ROLI launched a Kickstarter campaign for LUMI, a light-up keyboard aimed at beginners. The campaign surpassed its £100,000 target within two hours. LUMI featured 24 RGB-illuminated keys designed to visually guide learners through songs and lessons via a companion app, and used the same DNA connectors as BLOCKS. It was named one of TIME's Best Inventions in 2019.

In July 2024, ROLI announced that LUMI would be unified with the ROLI brand. LUMI Keys was rebranded as ROLI Piano M and the LUMI Music app became ROLI Learn.

=== Piano & Piano M ===
ROLI Piano M (formerly LUMI Keys) is a 24-minikey wireless MPE keyboard. It features per-key pitch bend and polyphonic aftertouch, RGB backlighting on every key using patented "BrightKey" technology, and connects via USB-C or Bluetooth. Multiple units can be magnetically connected to extend the octave range. Piano M is available in "Learn" and "Create" configurations, bundled with the ROLI Learn app or ROLI Studio software respectively.

In January 2025, at the NAMM Show, ROLI announced ROLI Piano, a larger 49-key model with full-sized keys, retaining BrightKey illumination and MPE capabilities. ROLI Piano, together with the Airwave hand-tracking device and the ROLI Learn app, forms the ROLI Piano System - an integrated learning and creation platform. In October 2025, the ROLI Piano System was named one of TIME's Best Inventions of 2025, the company's third inclusion on the list.

=== Airwave ===
ROLI Airwave is a hand-tracking controller that uses infrared cameras and proprietary "ROLI Vision" technology to track 27 joints in each of the player's hands at 90 frames per second. The tracking data is converted into MIDI in real time, enabling musicians to manipulate sound through gestures above the keyboard - what ROLI calls "Dimensions of Air." Airwave launched in October 2024 and is designed primarily for use with ROLI Piano, Piano M, and Seaboard, with support for third-party MIDI keyboards added post-launch.

In the context of music learning, Airwave enables the ROLI Learn app to provide real-time feedback on hand positioning, posture, and finger technique.

=== Software ===
ROLI Learn (formerly the LUMI Music app) is a subscription-based music education app for iOS and Android. It offers over 1,200 songs, 300+ interactive lessons, and arcade-style games designed to reinforce keyboard skills. In January 2025, ROLI added a voice-enabled Piano AI Assistant for answering questions about music theory and practice. In February 2026, ROLI announced AI Music Coach, an evolution of the assistant that combines Airwave's hand tracking with conversational AI to deliver spoken, personalised feedback on technique, timing, and finger placement in real time. It supports 40 languages and entered closed beta in February 2026.

For music creators, Equator was originally an embedded synthesizer for the Seaboard Grand, developed with FXpansion. In 2020, ROLI released Equator2, a major update with six synthesis engines, over 1,300 presets, and expanded MPE support. ROLI Studio is a software suite included with ROLI hardware, providing MPE-enabled presets and creative tools. ROLI previously created the Noise music-making app.

The company held the rights to the JUCE C++ audio framework from 2014 until selling them to PACE Anti-Piracy in 2020. ROLI also acquired virtual instruments maker FXpansion and social music platform Blend.

== Awards ==
In 2014 the ROLI Seaboard GRAND was awarded with the 'Design of the Year' award from the Design Museum of London, and the Swarovski Emerging Talent Medal presented at the Celebration of Design Awards at the London Design Festival.

The ROLI Seaboard RISE 25 won a "Best of Innovation" award from the Consumer Technology Association and '2015 Product of the Year' by FutureMusic.

In 2019, ROLI LUMI was named one of TIME's Best Inventions. In 2022, the Seaboard RISE 2 was named one of TIME's Best Inventions.

The ROLI Piano System was named one of TIME's Best Inventions of 2025. The system also received a CES 2026 Innovation Award. In 2026, ROLI Piano and ROLI Airwave each won an iF Design Award.
