= Beijing Great Wheel =

General information
- Status: Went into receivership in 2010
- Type: Ferris wheel
- Location: Chaoyang Park, Beijing, China
- Coordinates: 39°56′58″N 116°28′47″E

Height
- Height: 208 m (682 ft)

The Beijing Great Wheel, (simplified Chinese: 北京朝天轮; traditional Chinese: 北京朝天輪; pinyin: Běijīng Cháotiānlún) a 208-metre (682 ft) tall giant Ferris wheel, was to have been constructed in eastern Beijing's Chaoyang Park, one of the 2008 Summer Olympics venues. If it had been built, it would have become the world's tallest Ferris wheel, superseding the 165 m (541 ft) Singapore Flyer (world's tallest 2008–2014).

The Great Wheel Corporation originally forecast the wheel would start turning on August 1, 2008, one week in advance of the Beijing-hosted 2008 Summer Olympics. In 2007, Chinese state media reported that construction had begun, with completion delayed until 2009 due to design issues. Completion was subsequently rescheduled for 2010.

On 3 May 2010 it was reported that Great Beijing Wheel Co., the company set up to build the wheel, had gone into receivership after breaching the conditions of a loan, with Ferrier Hodgson and Zolfo Cooper appointed as administrative receivers.

== Design ==
If it had been completed, the wheel would have had a diameter of 198 m (650 ft), and each of its 48 air conditioned observation capsules would have been able to carry up to 40 passengers.

It would have been rotated by four drive units, each capable of producing over 16 million lb-ft of torque and comprising a pair of hydraulic drive modules, each module containing a hydraulic power unit driving four hydraulic motors. Each of the 32 hydraulic motors was to have powered a planetary gearbox driving rubber tyres against the wheel's circumferential rim.

An automated boarding system would have enabled the wheel to rotate continuously while passengers boarded and disembarked the capsules via electric feeder vehicles.

It was expected that, on a clear sunny day, passengers would have been able to see the Great Wall of China in the mountains to Beijing's north.
