= Wowkie Zhang =

Chinese singer (born 1983)

Wowkie Zhang Da Zhang Wei 大张伟
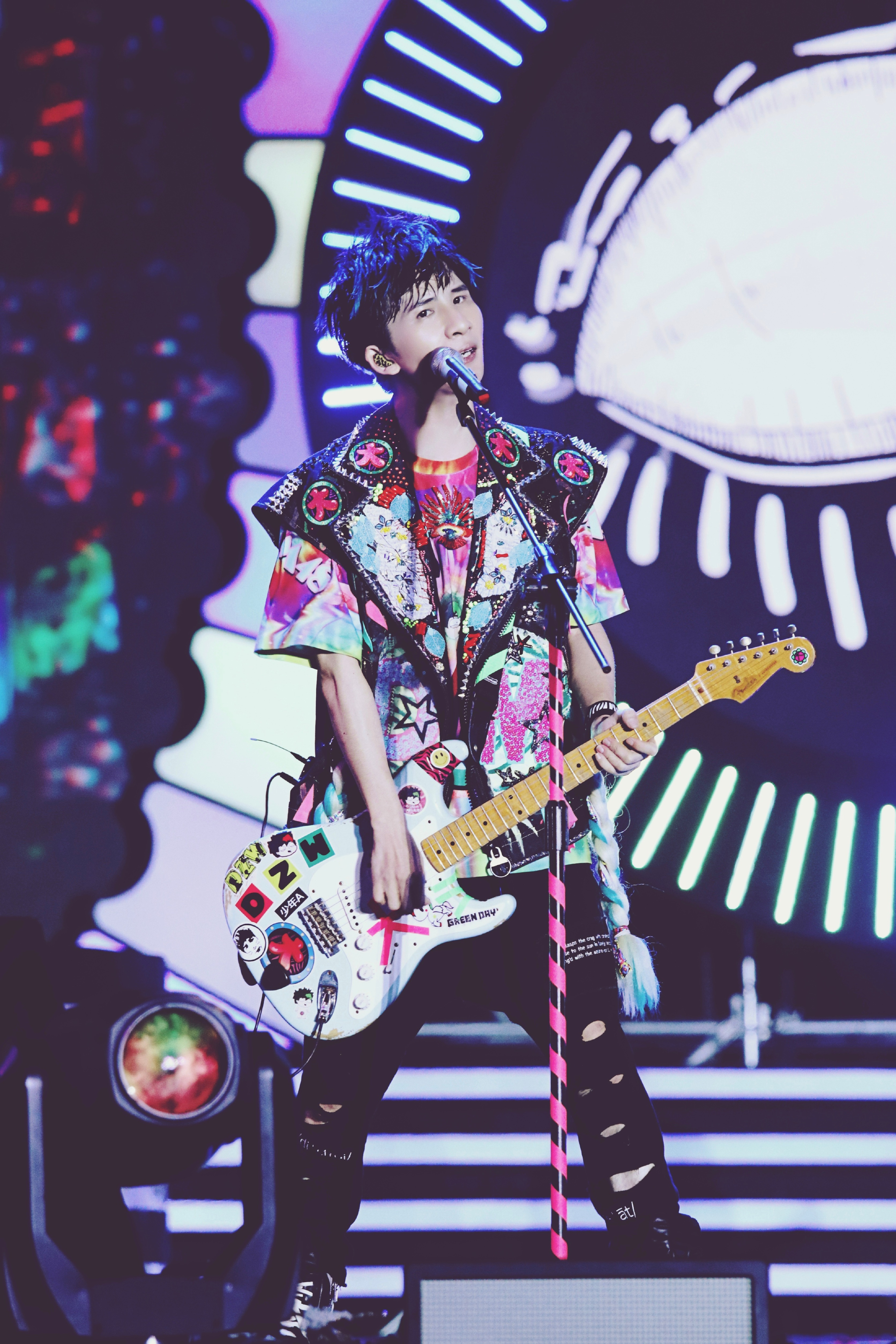
- Zhang in September 2009

Background information
- Also known as: Wowkie Da, Da Zhang Wei
- Born: Zhang Wei; 31 August 1983 (age 43); Beijing, China
- Genres: Mandopop; EDM; pop-punk
- Occupations: Singer; guitarist; composer; producer; TV host; reality TV personality
- Instruments: Vocals; guitar
- Years active: 1998–present
- Label: Taihe Music Group
- Formerly of: The Flowers (1998–2009)

Chinese name
- Traditional Chinese: 張偉
- Simplified Chinese: 张伟
Transcriptions
Standard Mandarin
- Hanyu Pinyin: Zhāng Wěi
- Wade–Giles: Chang^{1} Wei^{3}
- IPA: [ʈʂáŋ wèɪ]

Zhang Wei (Chinese: 张伟; born 31 August 1983), known professionally as Wowkie Zhang or Da Zhang Wei (大张伟; Dà Zhāng Wěi), is a Chinese singer, songwriter, and musician. He is best known as the lead singer, guitarist, and primary songwriter of the rock band The Flowers, which is recognized for its distinctive pop punk style and satirical, youth-driven themes.

He is also known for his 2018 song "Sunshine, Rainbow, White Pony" which came to prominence in the 2020s due to a misheard lyric that sounded like the English racial slur nigga. This term would later be popularized by American streamer IShowSpeed, who met Zhang in a 2025 livestream in China.

== Early life and career ==
=== 1983–1998 ===
Zhang was born on 31 August 1983, in Beijing, China. He completed his elementary school education in the Chongwen District in Beijing before joining the Children's Cultural Palace to practice singing. At the age of 10, he won first place in the Chongwen District singing competition, as well as the Beijing Middle School and Elementary School Students Sing Competition.

In the fourth grade, Zhang, along with other singers in the Children's Cultural Palace, attended the Children's Choir competition in Russia and came in second place. During the fifth grade, Zhang became a member of the China Central Television (CCTV) Yinhe Teenage Art Troupe after passing its audition. The Yinhe Teenage Art Troupe has produced many superstars in the contemporary Chinese pop music world, including Faye Wong, Cai Guoqing, Wang Xuechun and Liu Chunyan.

=== 1998–2009 ===
In February 1998, Zhang and his friends performed in a pub and met artist/agent Hong Feng, forming The Flowers together in June 1998. As Zhang Wei was a common name in the Chinese language,he became known by his stage name, Da Zhang Wei.

In January 1999, The Flowers signed with a small Beijing-based Chinese independent label, New Bees Music, and released their first album, On the Other Side of Happiness. The album turned out to be a success with many hit songs like "Stillness", "Disillusion", and "School's Out".

In December 2001, they released their second album, Strawberry Statement ("草莓声明").

In 2002, they won the Media Award for the 2nd Chinese Pop Music Festival.

In 2004, they won the Most Popular Band in the 4th Global Mandarin Pop Chart and the Chinese Music Pioneer Chart. The same year, the band signed a contract with EMI. In June, they released a single CD, I Am Your Romeo ("我是你的罗密欧").

From 2004 to 2005, the band experimented with various musical styles, including hip hop and techno. In 2005, the band released "Xi Shua Shua" (嘻唰唰), propelling Zhang to household-name status. "Xi Shua Shua" remains popular overseas, in countries such as Malaysia, as well as in China, especially for parties, square dancing (广场舞) and karaoke.

Xi Shua Shua was included on the band's fourth studio album, Hua Ji Wang Chao, or Blooming Dynasty, released in July 2005. The album won numerous awards in China and sold some 200,000 copies in the forty days after its release.

The Flowers have been referred to as China's "first famous adolescent band." The band disbanded in 2009, and Zhang embarked on his solo career afterwards. Since 2009, he has released five albums and over thirteen singles, achieving record sales of over five million copies.

=== 2010–present ===
Zhang became known to younger audiences as a host and TV personality. In 2016, he became a co-host for China's top talk show Day Day Up. In 2021, he departed from the show along with Wang Yibo, as Hunan TV reworked Day Day Up and Happy Camp following scandals of other hosts.

In 2014, Zhang released "Bei-er Shuang", meaning "Super Euphoric". He performed the song at China Central TV's Spring Festival Gala, a show viewed by Chinese audiences at home and abroad. The song became an instant national sensation. Psy used "Bei-er Shuang" when he performed with Chinese girl band SNH48 in China.

In 2016, Zhang created a theme song for the advertisement of Alipay's new function, combining Beijing opera with EDM. He also performed in Heroes of Remix as a guest performer, remixing Beijing folk song "Beijing Chick" and 1980s rock song "The Long March" in the song "New Beijing Chick" (北京小妞). In the same show, he also remixed the theme song of 80s cartoon Hulu Brothers (葫芦娃). In this show he brought forward the concept of CDM—China Dance Music, encouraging musicians to create music using their own ethnic style, rather than forgetting their own cultural identity in following international trends.

In 2018, Zhang appeared as a judge on Rave Now. On the show, he scouted the winning performer, Jiang Liang. He also scouted a team of EDM musicians who mainly performed in underground pubs and bars in China. His 2018 song, Am a Popping Candy, combines EDM with traditional Yunnan ethnic style and Shandong clapper talk, an ancient storytelling music performance.

=== Sunshine, Rainbow, White Pony (阳光彩虹小白马) ===
His 2018 song "Sunshine, Rainbow, White Pony" (阳光彩虹小白马) later gained international viral attention online after being widely used in memes and short-form videos. The chorus repeatedly uses the Mandarin pause/filler word 內個 (often pronounced nèi ge or nà ge), literally meaning "that," and commonly used in speech similarly to English "um." Because the pronunciation can be misheard by English speakers as the racial slur nigger, the refrain has been cited as an example of cross-cultural linguistic misunderstanding, including in discussions surrounding a 2020 controversy involving a University of Southern California professor’s classroom use of the same filler word. During YouTuber IShowSpeed’s trip to China, he met Zhang in Changsha in April 2025 and performed the song with him at a Hunan TV studio.

== Artistry ==
=== Influences ===
Zhang's early influence came from the bands Green Day and Sex Pistols. After he went solo, he turned his interest to EDM. He also tries to incorporate elements of traditional Chinese art forms into his music.

Zhang writes his own songs. As of January 2019, he had written over 190 songs. During his time with The Flowers, he was the principal songwriter of all the songs on the band's albums.
