= FXpansion =

Software companies of the United Kingdom

- Company type: Ltd
- Industry: Music Software
- Founded: 1999
- Headquarters: London, United Kingdom
- Area served: World
- Key people: Angus Hewlett (CEO); SKoT McDonald (CTO); Rhiannon Bankston-Thomas (COO/CFO)
- Products: Geist2; Strobe2; Cypher2; Tremor; Etch; Bloom; Maul; DCAM Dynamics
- Parent: ROLI
- Website: www.fxpansion.com

FXpansion is a Ltd company that produces music software including Geist2, Strobe2, Tremor, Etch, Bloom, Maul and DCAM Dynamics.

== History ==
FXpansion is a company that develops music software, and was founded in 1999 in London, United Kingdom. Their base of operations from 2005 to 2009 was in London's inner East End, in the media/bar zone of Shoreditch. In 2008, FXpansion opened a US subsidiary, FXpansion USA Inc, to handle sales and distribution in North America, and a development office in Australia. In 2009, FXpansion relocated their HQ to London's South Bank.

On 1 September 2016, it was announced that fellow London based music technology company ROLI had acquired FXpansion.

In April 2020, ROLI sold FXpansion instrument BFD to InMusic Brands.

== Industry Awards ==
- BFD1 – Electronic Musician Editors' Choice Award 2005
- BFD2 – Electronic Musician Editors' Choice Award 2008
- Geist – Electronic Musician Editors' Choice Award 2012
- BFD3 – Electronic Musician Editors' Choice Award 2014
