= The Flowers (Chinese band) =

Chinese boy band

The Flowers 花儿乐队
- From left to right: Yang, Xingyu, Zhang Wei, and Wenbo

Background information
- Origin: Beijing, China
- Genres: Mandopop; pop-punk
- Years active: 1998–2009
- Labels: EMI Music China; SH Push Typhoon; New Bees Music
- Past members: Da Zhang Wei; Guo Yang; Wang Wenbo; Shi Xingyu

The Flowers (Chinese: 花儿乐队; pinyin: Huār Yuèduì) was a Chinese rock band formed in Beijing in 1998. The original lineup consisted of lead vocalist and guitarist Da Zhang Wei (张伟; Zhāng Wěi), bass guitarist Guo Yang (郭阳; Guō Yáng), and drummer Wang Wenbo (王文博; Wáng Wénbó). In 2001, guitarist Shi Xingyu (石醒宇; Shí Xǐngyǔ) joined the band. Over their career, The Flowers recorded and released six studio albums.

In the summer of 2008, Shi Xingyu left the band after a personal dispute with Zhang Wei. Subsequently, the group held a talent contest to recruit a new member but eventually disbanded in June 2009.

== History ==
Da Zhang Wei (now known as Wowkie Da), Guo Yang and Wang Wenbo met in high school. They began performing in local bars and clubs around Beijing, playing pop punk reminiscent of Green Day and Blink-182. In 1998, the trio signed to New Bees Music, a small Beijing-based Chinese independent label. A year later, the band released their debut studio album, On the Other Side of Happiness. The album included the songs "Stillness", "Disillusion", and "School's Out."

The Flowers became involved in a two-year lawsuit with New Bees Music, which was eventually settled out of court. They signed to EMI in 2001, at which point Shi Xingyu joined as the fourth member.

Strawberry Statement, the Flowers' second album, was released in December 2001. They released their third studio album, I Am Your Romeo, in July 2004. The album incorporated hip-hop and techno-experimentation music styles.

In 2005, the band released the single "Xi Shua Shua," which was included on their fourth studio album, Hua Ji Wang Chao, also called Blooming Dynasty, released in July 2005. The album sold 200,000 copies within forty days of its release. Later that year, The Flowers appeared at China Central Television's Lantern Festival gala show. The group was nominated by the organizers of the Pepsi Music Chart Awards in China for Best Arrangement, Best Lyrics, Best Composer, and Best Rock 'n' Roll Band. These nominations were later revoked due to accusations of plagiarism.

Hua Tian Xi Shi, the Flowers' fifth album, was released in October 2006. In 2007, The Flowers began work on their sixth studio album, Hua Ling Sheng Hui, or Flower Age Pageant, which was released on October 15, 2007, with "Qiong Kaixin" (or "Shiny Happiness") as its lead single. According to Zhang Wei, he aimed to incorporate traditional Chinese performances and cultures into the album. The same year, The Flowers received the award for Best Mainland Band at the China Music Awards. The Flowers were commissioned to write and perform a Mandarin version of the theme song of the Disney film High School Musical 2, which the group agreed to do.

=== Breakup ===
In July 2008, the Flowers' record label announced that the band's guitarist, Shi Xingyu, had quit the band after seven years. Following Xingyu's departure, the band held a talent competition in Beijing, with fifty contestants competing to become the new member of the Flowers and participate in its upcoming tenth-anniversary concert tour. However, no winner was selected. On June 21, 2009, the Flowers disbanded.

== Controversy ==
=== Plagiarism accusations ===
The group faced accusations of plagiarism after similarities were noted between their songs and those of other artists. For instance, "Xi Shua Shua" shares similarities with the Japanese pop duo Puffy AmiYumi's "K2G"; and "Emperor's Favorite" resembles Caparezza's "Fuori dal Tunnel". Zhang Wei and representatives of EMI acknowledged the similarities, stating that while the songs were not intentionally plagiarized, they did contain some flaws. None of the original artists responded to the allegations. The Flowers chose to withdraw from all music award competitions for the remainder of 2006. Zhang Wei claimed that the band members listened to up to 100 songs per day, resulting in so many tunes stored in their heads that they "had no time to identify, revise, and remove" those that were not originally theirs.

=== Fighting incident ===
In 2007, the band was seen dining at a restaurant in Beijing near Chaoyang Park when an argument broke out. According to reports, the situation escalated when Zhang Wei struck another band member, later identified as Xingyu, and pushed a man who attempted to intervene. A nearby restaurant patron recorded the incident on his cell phone. The band's label acknowledged the dispute, explaining that it stemmed from differing opinions among the band members about their upcoming album. Zhang Yi, a senior official from the record company, clarified that the argument began when Zhang Wei and another band member disagreed on the album's sound, further explaining that the band felt significant pressure during the recording, especially after being involved in a plagiarism controversy.

== Band members ==
=== Da Zhang Wei ===
Da Zhang Wei was born Zhang Wei on 31 August 1983, in Beijing and cites Green Day, Ramones, and Nirvana as his inspirations.

=== Shi Xingyu ===
Shi Xingyu, nicknamed Xiao Yu (Chinese: 小宇; pinyin: Xiǎo Yǔ), was born on 11 January 1983. Xingyu was the last member to join the band, in 2001. His favorite bands include Blink-182 and Smash Mouth.

=== Guo Yang ===
Guo Yang was born on 29 May 1978, in Beijing. Yang's inspirations include Green Day and Nirvana.

=== Wang Wenbo ===
Wang Wenbo was born on 22 October 1982, in Beijing. His inspirations include Green Day, The Cure, and Nirvana.

== Discography ==
- Next to Happiness (1999) (幸福的旁边, Xìngfú de pángbiān)
- Strawberry Statement (2001) (草莓声明, Cǎo méi shēng míng)
- I Am Your Romeo (2004) (我是你的罗密欧, Wǒ shì nǐ de luōmì'ōu)
- Blooming Dynasty (2005) (花季王朝, Huājì wáng cháo)
- Hua Tian Xi Shi (2006) (花天囍世, Huā tiān xǐ shì)
- Flower Age Pageant (2007) (花龄盛会, Huā líng shènghuì)
