= ROLI Seaboard =

Electronic musical keyboard by ROLI

Seaboard
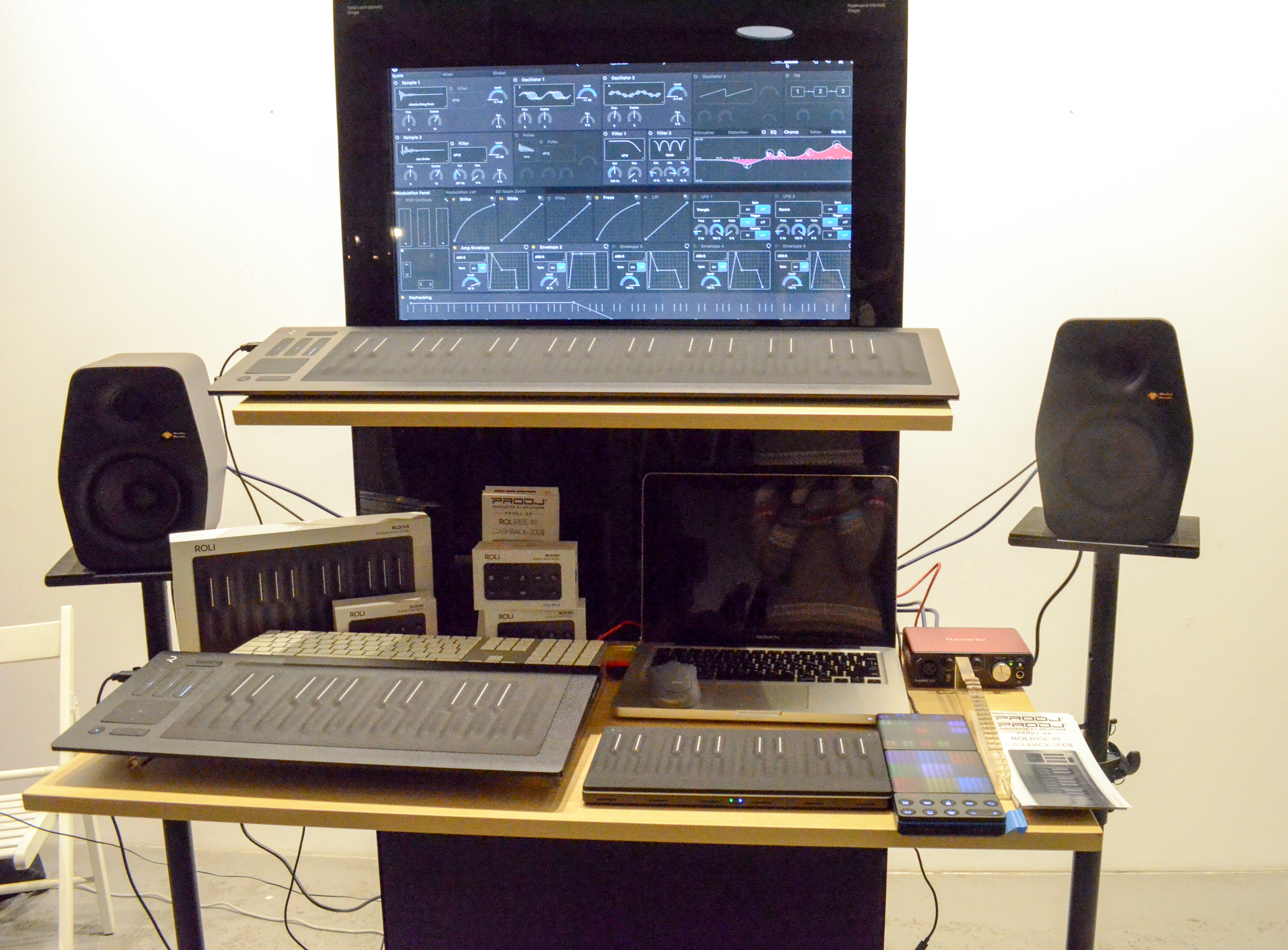
- Three ROLI Seaboards
- Manufacturer: ROLI
- Price: BLOCK: £329; Rise 25: Є849; Rise 49: Є1,195; Grand: £3,299

Technical specifications
- Filter: Low-pass, high-pass, bandpass, notch, comb, state-variable
- Aftertouch expression: Yes
- Effects: Ring modulation, EQ, chorus, delay, reverb, bit crusher, distortion.

Input/output
- External control: MIDI in and out (I/O) via USB

The Seaboard is a musical keyboard-style MIDI controller manufactured by the British music technology company ROLI. It has a continuous sensor-embedded flexible rubber surface for playing the keys instead of traditional lever-style "moving keys". Some models, like the RISE Seaboard Grand, have an onboard sound engine. It has what the manufacturer calls "5D technology" which consists of five types of responsiveness to player actions: "strike", "glide" and "press", front to rear movement "slide" sensitivity, and release–velocity "lift" (RISE keyboard only). These responsiveness tools can be used to play the Seaboard with microtonal pitch bend sounds (like a fretless bass guitar), by moving the finger from note to note, or trigger a vibrato effect into a string patch just by wiggling the finger, which would not be possible on a traditional MIDI controller using only the keys. The Seaboard also features polyphonic aftertouch, and a built-in USB- charged battery. There are three Seaboard models: the small minikey BLOCK (24 keys), the RISE (25- or 49-key versions), and the GRAND, an 88-key keyboard with an onboard sound engine.

ROLI calls the five responsiveness triggers "5D technology". The five ways that the ROLI senses the player's interactions are:

- Strike – The way the player makes contact with the Seaboard (velocity)
- Press – Pressure applied to the Seaboard key after first making contact with it (aftertouch)
- Glide – Left and right movements from side to side on a Seaboard key, sending pitch bend information (pitch bend)
- Slide – Vertical movements "up and down" (from the beginning of the key to the end) the Seaboard key (brightness)
- Lift – The speed the player takes their fingers away from the Seaboard keys (release velocity)

The unit supports wireless MIDI over bluetooth. ROLI reports that latency of the unit at 30ms using bluetooth and 24ms via USB cable. Sounds for the sound engine can be edited and created by using a ROLI software called Equator, which can be quite resource intensive. ROLI claims that it is the world's first purpose-built, multidimensional soft synth. Equator's synth sounds are designed to make changes in sound based on the Seabord's five types of resonsiveness. Effects units in Equator include ring modulation, EQ, chorus, delay, reverb, bit crusher, and distortion. Seaboard is designed to work with non-Seaboard music software programs such as Ableton Live, GarageBand, and Native Instruments' Kontakt, among others.

== Models ==
=== BLOCK ===
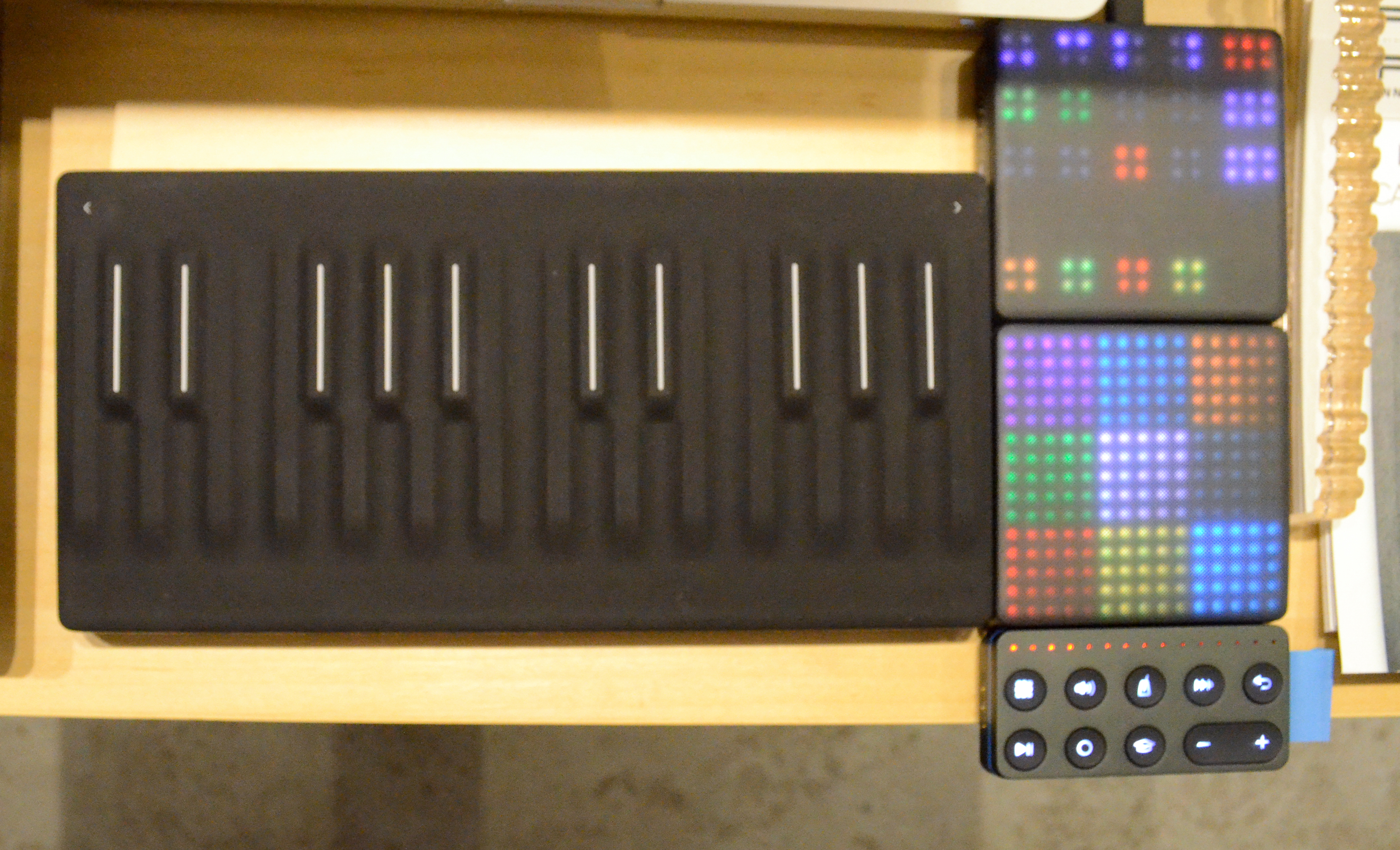
A ROLI BLOCK plugged into two Lightpad BLOCK units and a RISE pad.

BLOCK is the smallest, lightest-weight ROLI keyboard, with 24 mini keys. It is designed to be interconnectable with other RISE devices, using magnetic connectors. Multiple BLOCK keyboards can be connected together, or the BLOCK can be connected to the Lightpad BLOCK, a RISE pad controller intended for use playing beats, triggering digital audio workstation loops, and controlling the BLOCK keyboards or effect units. The BLOCK keyboard is 282 mm (11 inches) wide, 24.7 mm (1 inch) high, and 141 mm (5.5 inches) deep. It weighs 650g (1.43pounds) and has a ten-hour battery life and a four-hour charge time. It has a single USB-C port for MIDI out and providing power and it provides full MIDI compatibility over USB and Bluetooth LE.

=== RISE ===
RISE 25 and RISE 49 have 25 and 49 keys, respectively. They have black aluminium cases and soft rubbery key surfaces with no moving parts. Traditional MIDI controllers have keys and a selection of knobs or wheels to control other parameters such as pitch bends or volume. RISE keyboards do not have knobs or wheels as additional controls; instead, they have touch surfaces, such as an XY touchpad (with four direction arrows and a centre button) and touch faders (with no moving parts), and buttons for octave shift, a preset/synth patch browser, on/off, and a MIDI mode selector. The touch faders are used to control the press, glide, and slide parameters. With the touch faders set to their minimum level, the RISE keyboards become more like regular MIDI keyboards in their responsiveness, with the force (or gentleness) of the striking or pressing of the keys being the main factor. With the pitch glide set to minimum, a palm gliss on the white notes produces a piano-type sound, with the result being a rapid scale of distinct notes. With the glide fader set to higher positions, a palm gliss produces a true glissando, and moving between two notes while maintaining pressure creates a trombone-like microtonal pitch bend sound.

With the touch faders increased towards their maximum, the RISE responds to other types of interaction beyond the initial striking of a note (or notes), so that aftertouch, movement from side to side, and movement up and down a key sending messages to the sound engine to modify the sound. As the faders have a range of positions, a variety of intermediate response effects are possible, such as having a small amount of pitch bend.

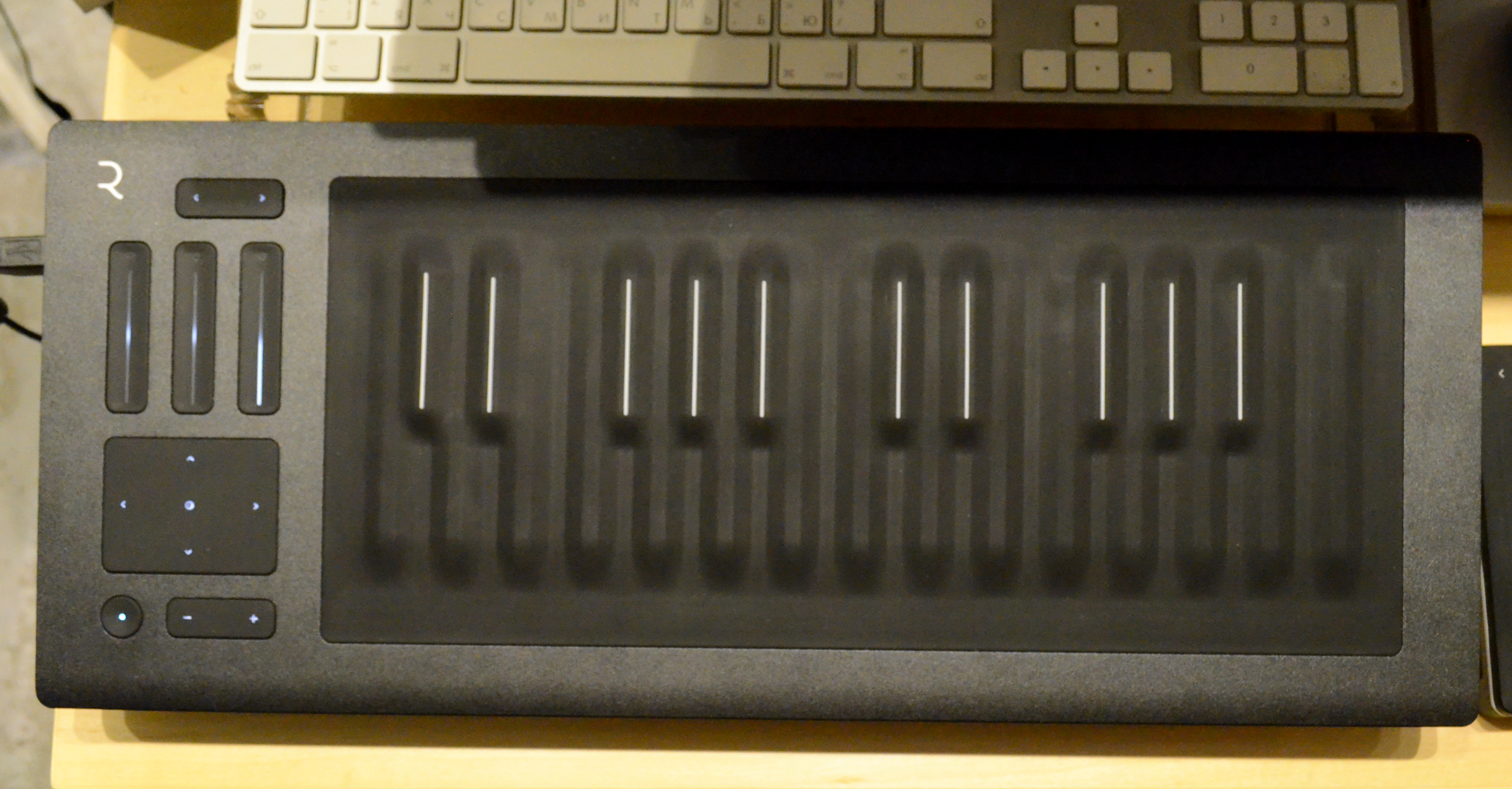
A RISE 25 keyboard. To the left of the key surface are the buttons, faders, and touchpad.

The RISE 49 is 834 mm (32.8 inches) wide, 23 mm (0.9 inches) high, and 210 mm (8.27 inches) deep. It weighs 4.2 kg (9.26 pounds). The battery has an eight-hour life and a three-hour charge time. It has a 1/4" input for a sustain pedal, a USB-B port (for MIDI out and power) and a USB-A port (for charging peripherals). It provides full MIDI compatibility over USB and Bluetooth LE. All the white markings light up with white when the RISE is powered and the control buttons have a backlight, which is constant for some buttons and pads, but uses VU meter-style segments for the faders, to show the level. Users must install a software suite, including a utility program called ROLI Dashboard for RISE and the company's synth engine, Equator. Equator's sounds are designed to respond to the RISE's five response dimensions.

In Equator, the hardness or softness of pressing controls volume, gliding microtonally changes the pitch, sliding alters timbre (for example by changing the filter cutoff), pressure alters the sustain level and timbre. If the key release or "lift" response is used, it changes how notes end. The Y–axis slide creates MIDI CC 74 messages (which are usually set to controls the cutoff frequency of a filter). All of the finger touches are independent; one finger can wiggle on a note causing vibrato, while another finger slides between notes, causing a pitch bend, while the thumb slides up and down its key, causing timbre changes. The performer can create crescendos and obtain a breath controller sound that resembles a bowed string or wind instrument.

=== GRAND Stage ===
The 88-key GRAND Stage was produced in a limited edition of 88 units. It is a plug and play controller and synthesizer that is about 26mm thick. Unlike the RISE keyboards, it does not have an array of buttons and faders. It has a black aluminium case, a silicone key surface, and a circular "user dial" made of aluminium that can be rotated to make changes, or pressed in its centre button. On the rear panel, there are three pedal inputs, two 1/4" audio jacks, a volume wheel, a 1/8" stereo headphone jack, USB type A and B jacks, an input for the DC power supply, and a power switch.

== History ==
The Seaboard digital keyboard's creator, Roland Lamb was "...inspired by waves", in particular by the way that they are "...both continuous and separated into discrete sections — the peaks and troughs". Lamb sought to design a digital keyboard that allowed performers to play "individual notes, but also explore the spaces between them." Lamb's design philosophy is based on his notion of the importance of a "...living musical instrument". Lamb states that a "living musical instrument", one that is still being played by a community of musicians, is "10 percent physical, 90 percent cultural". In contrast, an ancient instrument in a museum may be one that "...nobody knows how to play it or what the music was like that was made with it. Then it’s just a dead object." Lamb also argues that musical instruments are "the most physically intelligent tools", because a professional violinist's "level of virtuosity" is far beyond that of users of other tools, due to the years of "skill and practice" required to play an instrument at a high level.

Lamb wanted to create an instrument offered "a depth of expression" that is accessible, in that "[y]ou don’t have to learn how the controls work, you just play, and learn as you play" the Seaboard. Lamb claims that the Seaboard "...expressiveness of an acoustic instrument with the adaptability of a digital" instrument, which gave him the inspiration to create a playing surface that was both "...continuous and discrete". Lamb believes that the current world of music-making is "problematic if not broken," with people failing to properly address the need for versatile digital instruments." During Lamb's PhD studies, he learned about early critics' comments about the pianoforte after it was introduced in the late 1700s. The first musicians to try the pianoforte found it "...too difficult to play" and they thought no one would use it, because they did not feel that you could control the new instrument." Lamb notes that critics made the same comments about his Seaboard designs; he thinks that in time, musicians will become more comfortable using the soft-surfaced instrument.

== Reception ==
Paul Miller's review of the BLOCK for The Verge calls it "multi-dimensionally expressive, a little hard to learn, and now available in a much more portable and affordable" format. Miller states that with the free Seaboard app, the "...hardware just makes the controls more accessible, expressive, and tactile."

James Vincent's review of the RISE and GRAND for Verge calls Seaboard creator Roland Lamb's belief that the instrument is more accessible "a bit generous", saying that while the Seaboard is "intuitive", there is still a "learning curve" using the "alien"-feeling, "foam mattress"-textured keyboard. Vincent stated that it is challenging because whereas with a normal piano, you just have to play the correct notes at the correct volume; with the Seaboard, you also have to focus on "...how hard you unpress them; how much you wiggle them, how far slide your fingers up them, and whether you want to incorporate glissandos at all." Vincent says that players who master the instrument will find it to be "amazingly adaptable", as it allows "molding the sound". Those words are some of what ROLI founder, Roland Lamb lives by. You can see it in his work on the MPE-enabled Seaboard and BLOCKs series of products.

KVR Audio states that there is a "slight learning curve" with the Seaboard, as "[k]eyboard players will have to adjust their [playing] styles"; but once they learn the new instrument, the reviewer states that they will have access to a level of "...expressiveness that has been traditionally reserved for string and wind instrument players."

== Alternatives ==
Keyboards made by other manufacturers that offer responsiveness beyond that of a traditional MIDI controller keyboard:

- K–Board
- QuNexus
- LinnStrument
- Kaoline

== Notable users ==
- Hans Zimmer, composer
- Martyn Ware, producer, member of The Human League and Heaven 17
- BT, producer, composer, electronic music performer
- Steve Angello
- AR Rahman
- Jordan Rudess, pianist of Dream Theater
- Solar Fields

== See also ==
- MIDI controller
