= Chaoyang Park =

Urban park in Beijing, China

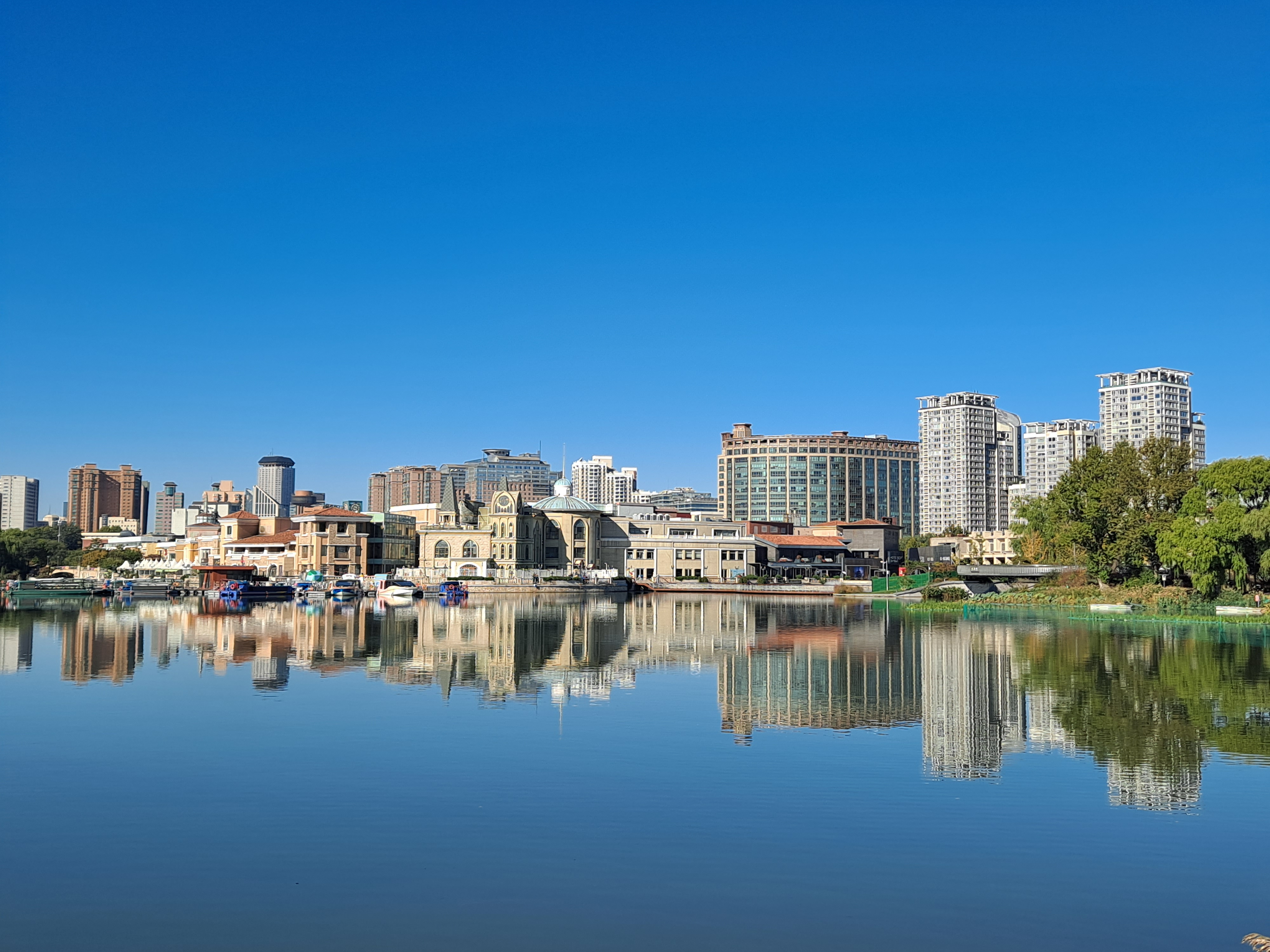
- Chaoyang Park

- Location within Beijing Location within China
- Interactive map of Chaoyang Park
- Type: Urban park
- Location: Chaoyang District, Beijing
- Coordinates: 39°56′04.46″N 116°28′34.62″E
- Area: 288.7 hectares (713 acres)
- Created: 1984
- Open: All year

Chaoyang Park (Chinese: 朝阳公园; pinyin: Cháoyáng Gōngyuán) is a park located on the site of the former Prince's Palace in Beijing's Chaoyang District.

The park's construction began in 1984 and it became Beijing's largest park. It is approximately 2.8 km in length and approximately 1.5 km in width. It has a total area of 288.7 hectares, and a water surface area of 68.2 hectares. The majority of land in the park is used as green space.

It features flower gardens, fairground with rides, activities such as laser tag and a high ropes course, roller coasters, landscaped areas and several large swimming pools. Bicycles and boats may also be hired at various locations in the park.

The Beijing Great Wheel, a 208 m (682 ft) tall giant Ferris wheel, was to have been constructed at Chaoyang Park, but went into receivership in 2010.

== Events ==
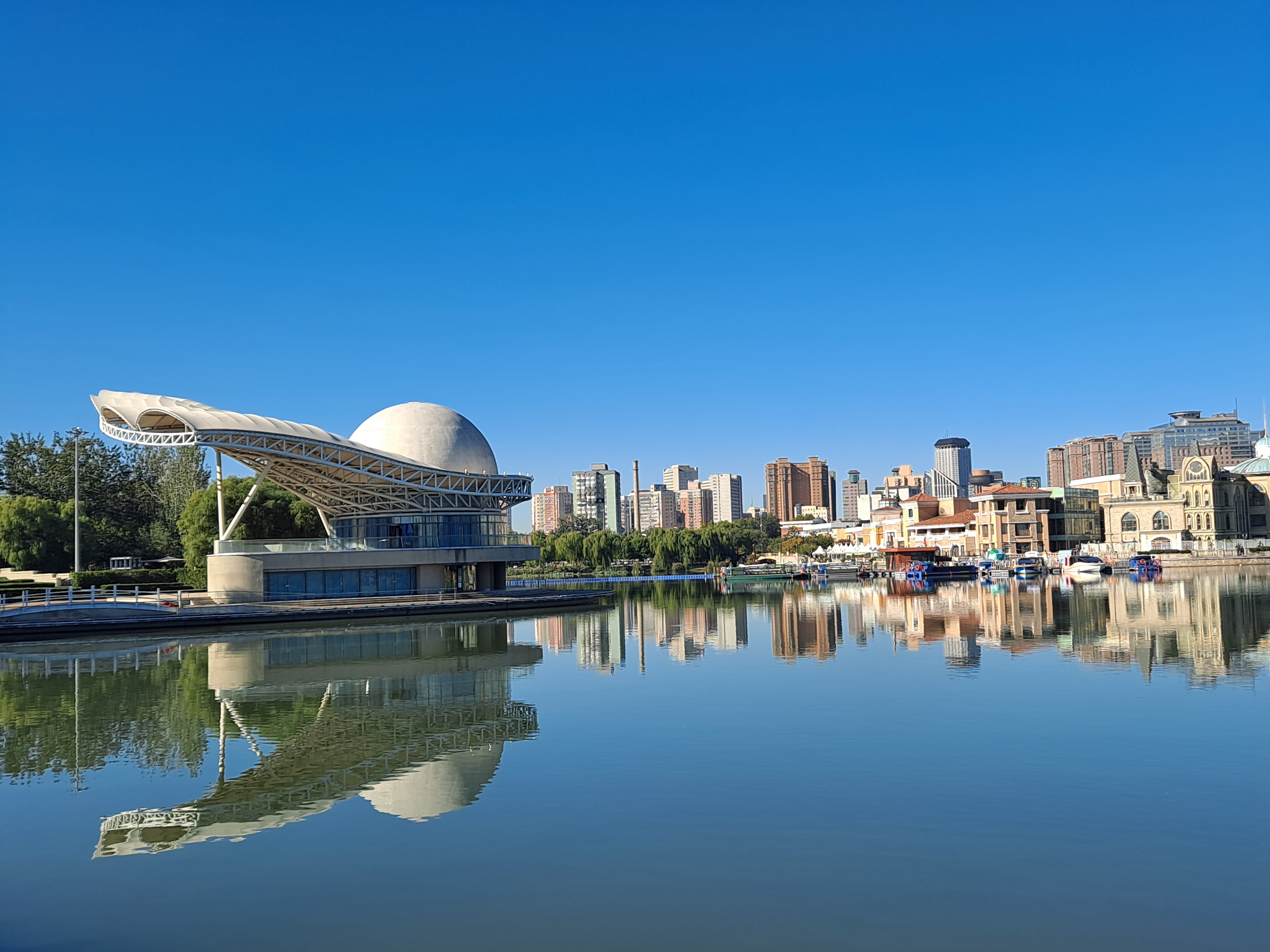
Chaoyang Park, Beijing 2023

Since 2005, the Beijing Pop Festival, featuring Chinese and international musical acts, has been held at Chaoyang Park each September.

A temporary beach volleyball stadium was constructed at Chaoyang Park to host the beach volleyball events of the 2008 Summer Olympics, using sand shipped in from Hainan island.

== Artworks ==
- Non-Violence (sculpture)
