= Face reveal =

Public reveal of an online creator's face

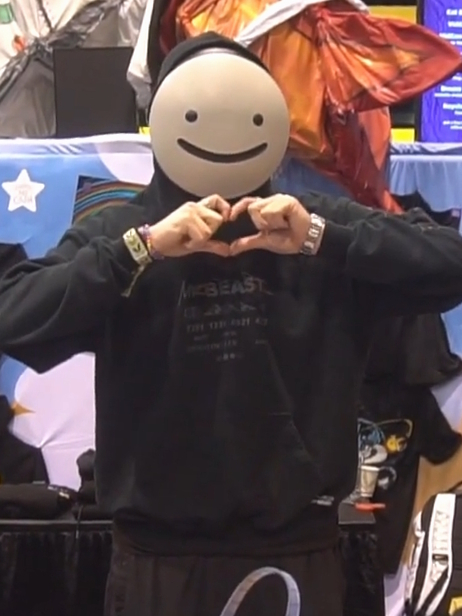
The face reveal of Minecraft YouTuber Dream was one of the most popular and controversial.

A face reveal is an event in internet culture in which a person who has previously concealed their physical appearance publicly reveals their face. It most commonly occurs among internet content creators such as livestreamers, video producers, or social media personalities, who have built an audience while remaining visually anonymous.

Minecraft YouTuber Dream's face reveal video had 53 million views as of April 2024. Dream's anonymity was a defining feature of his online presence, contributing to audience interest and the growth of his following on social media. The face reveal occurred on 2 October 2022. In the video titled "hi, I'm Dream", he removed a smiley face mask to show his face for the first time. The hashtag "DreamFaceReveal" was the top trending topic on Twitter in the United States the day of the reveal, and more negative tags such as "PutTheMaskBackOn" and "He's Ugly" trended as well.

VTubers are virtual content creators who appear as their own designed avatars rather than their real selves, often hiding their real faces as a result. Robin Schmieder for Celebrity Studies noted that audiences often interpret this visual anonymity as a form of masking and frequently request or anticipate a face reveal. These events are commonly presented as special releases and often generate increased viewership and online engagement. He also noted that audience interest in face reveals reflects a widespread assumption that a person's physical appearance represents a more authentic or "real" identity.
