= Great Berlin Wheel =

Coordinates: 52.510°N 13.333°E

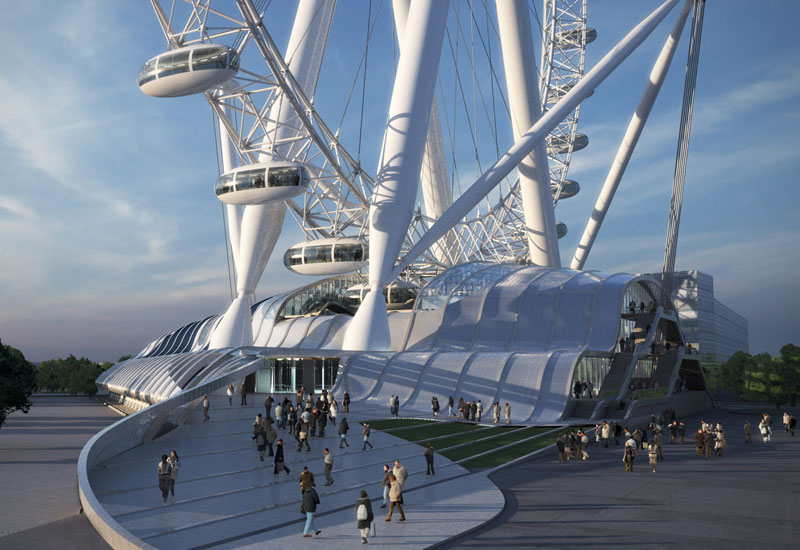
Artist's impression of the Great Berlin Wheel

The Great Berlin Wheel was a giant Ferris wheel to be built near the Berlin Zoological Garden (Zoologischer Garten Berlin) in Berlin, Germany, by the Great Wheel Corporation.

It was originally planned to be 185 m (607 ft) tall, with 36 passenger capsules, but this was subsequently revised to 175 m (574 ft) tall, with 28 passenger capsules, each able to accommodate 40 persons.

The groundbreaking ceremony was on 3 December 2007 and completion was originally planned for 2008, but the project stalled after encountering financial obstacles.

If it had been built, it would have become the world's tallest Ferris wheel, superseding the 165 m (541 ft) Singapore Flyer (world's tallest 2008–2014).
