= Great Wheel Corporation =

- Type: Private
- Headquarters: Singapore
- Products: Ferris wheels

Great Wheel Corporation was a company engaged in the development, building, financing, and operation of Ferris wheels, which they often termed "observation wheels" or "observation platforms".

Great Wheel Corporation, registered in Singapore as GWC Holdings, was a consultant for the 165-metre (541 ft) Singapore Flyer, the world's tallest Ferris wheel since it was completed in 2008. Florian Bollen was chairman of both Great Wheel Corporation and Singapore Flyer Pte Ltd. The Singapore Flyer went into receivership in May 2013.

In 2009, Great Wheel Corporation merged with World Tourist Attractions to form Great City Attractions. World Tourist Attractions went into administration in December 2010, followed by Great City Attractions in July 2012.

In May 2010, Great Wheel Corporation was one of several companies named in a report lodged with the prosecutor's office in Berlin, Germany, for alleged embezzlement.

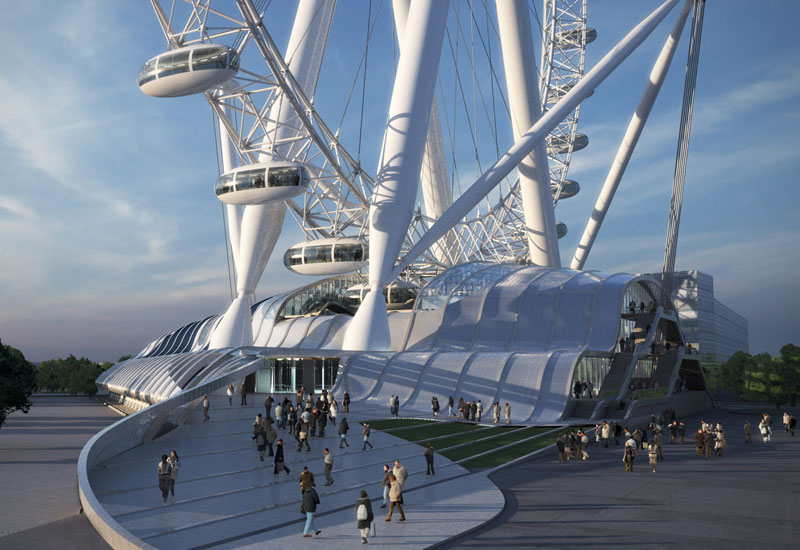
Artist's impression of the failed Great Berlin Wheel project

== History ==
In 2009, World Tourist Attractions had merged with Great Wheel Corporation to form Great City Attractions, said at that time to be "the world's largest operator of Observation Wheels." [sic]

In May 2010 it was reported that Great Beijing Wheel Co., the company set up to build the 208-metre (682 ft) tall Beijing Great Wheel, under construction since 2007, had gone into receivership after breaching the conditions of a loan.

On 23 December 2010, the holding company WTA Global Holdings, which traded as World Tourist Attractions, went into administration, having hit financial difficulties due to the seasonal nature of its trade. At that time, it was operating five large transportable wheels in the UK, in Dublin, Liverpool, Manchester, Weston Super-Mare, and Hyde Park in London. Some proved not to be viable during the off-season, while others simply failed to make the profits initially predicted. The company collapsed owing £16.4 million, including £8.9 million to unsecured creditors, who were expected to get nothing.

Early in 2011 the assets of WTA Global Holdings were bought out of administration for £230,000 by Great City Attractions, operating as a subsidiary of Elliot Hall Ltd, a new company set up by WTA Global Holdings director Elliot Hall.

In July 2012 it was reported that Great City Attractions had also gone into administration. It ceased trading the following month.

In May 2013 the Singapore Flyer went into receivership, and accountants Ferrier Hodgson were appointed as receiver and manager of the company's charged assets.

== Unbuilt projects ==
Great Wheel Corporation was involved in a number of giant Ferris wheel projects, all of which failed either prior to, or very shortly after, the start of construction.

Name	Height	Country	Location	Project history
Name	metres (feet)	Country	Location	Project history
Beijing Great Wheel	208 (682)	China	Beijing	Originally due to open 2008; Went into receivership in 2010
Great Dubai Wheel	185 (607)	United Arab Emirates	Dubai	Planning permission granted in 2006; Originally due to open 2009; Project cancellation confirmed January 2012
Great Berlin Wheel	175 (574)	Germany	Berlin	Originally due to open 2009 "Delayed"; no subsequent announcements
Jeddah Eye	150 (492)	Saudi Arabia	Jeddah	Originally due to open 2012; Construction should have begun in 2009; no subsequent announcements
Great Orlando Wheel	122 (400)	United States	Orlando	"Suspended" in 2009; Great Orlando Wheel Corp. placed in receivership in 2013
