= Singapore Flyer =

Observation wheel in Singapore

Coordinates: 1°17′21.83″N 103°51′47.63″E

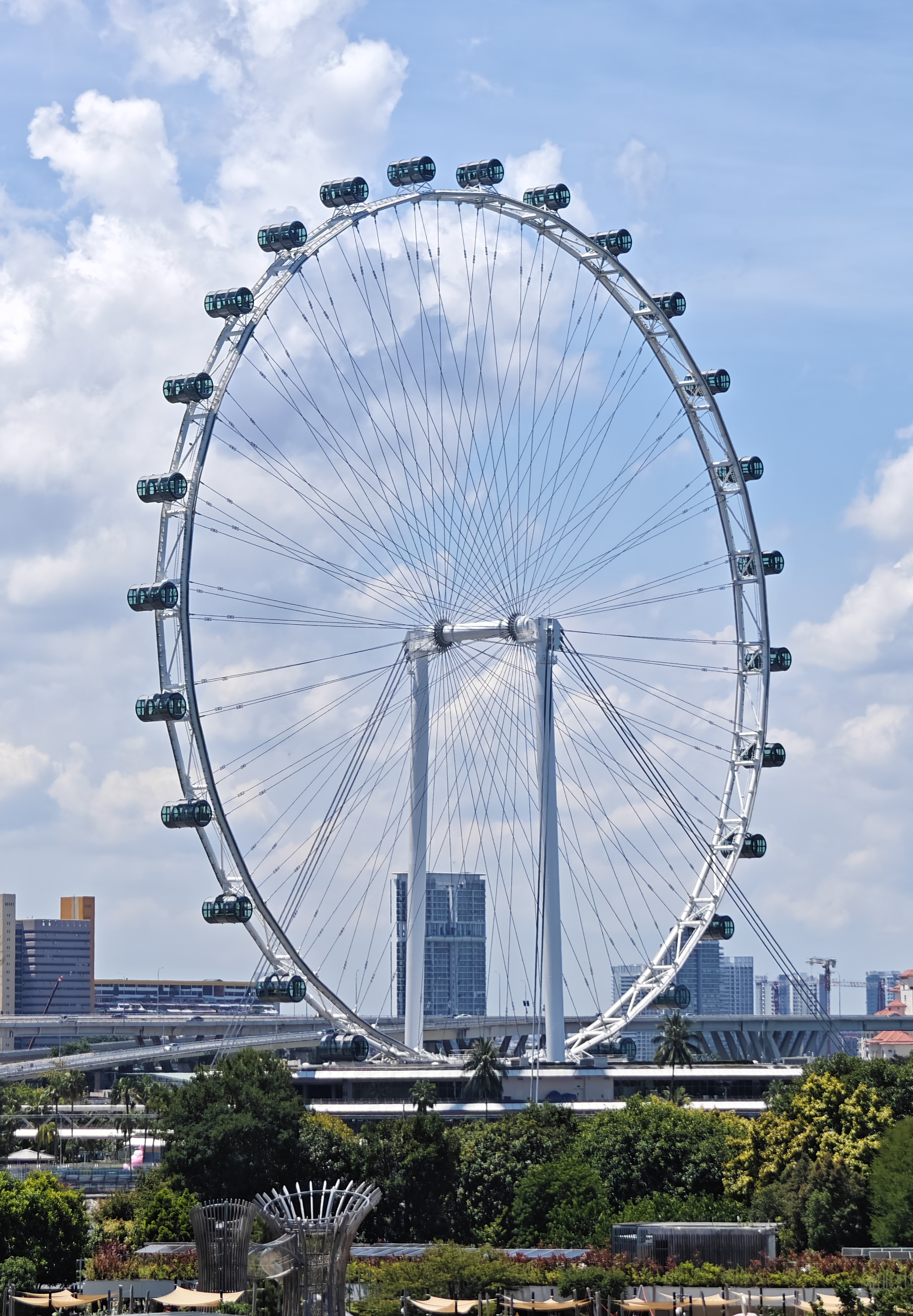
- Singapore Flyer in September 2025

General information
- Type: Ferris wheel
- Location: Singapore, 30 Raffles Avenue, Singapore 039803
- Construction started: 2005
- Completed: 2008
- Opening: 11 February 2008 (restricted); 1 March 2008 (soft); 15 April 2008 (official)
- Cost: S$240 million
- Owner: Straco Corporation Limited (90%), WTS Leisure Pte Ltd (10%)

Height
- Height: 165 m (541 ft)

Dimensions
- Diameter: 150 metres (492 ft)

Technical details
- Floor area: 33,700 m^{2} (362,700 sq ft)

Design and construction
- Architects: Kisho Kurokawa Architects & Associates, DP Architects
- Developer: Melchers Singapore
- Engineer: Arup
- Main contractor: Mitsubishi – Takenaka Consortium

Other information
- Seating capacity: 784

Website
- singaporeflyer.com

The Singapore Flyer (Note: Chinese: 新加坡摩天观景轮; Malay: Pelayang Singapura; Tamil: சிங்கப்பூர் ராட்டினம்) is an observation wheel at the Downtown Core district of Singapore. Officially opened on 15 April 2008, it has 28 air-conditioned capsules, each able to accommodate 28 passengers, and incorporates a three-story terminal building. The flyer has made numerous appearances in media and popular culture that features Singapore.

The Flyer has an overall height of 165 metres (541 ft), making it the world's tallest Ferris wheel upon completion. It was surpassed by the High Roller Ferris wheel which opened in 2014 in Las Vegas, Nevada, United States, with a height of 167.6 m (550 ft), making it 2.6 m (9 ft) taller than the Flyer.

== History ==
The Singapore Flyer was first conceived in the early 2000s by Patrick MacMahon of Melchers Project Management, a subsidiary of German company Melchers. Formal planning commenced in 2002. A new company, Singapore Flyer Pte Ltd, was formed as the developer, with Melchers Project Management holding a 75% stake, and the remainder held by Orient & Pacific Management.

The project was formally announced and endorsed on 27 June 2003 by the Singapore Tourism Board with the signing of a memorandum of understanding, formalising the understanding between the developer and tourism board with regard to the land-acquisition process.

Under this agreement, the tourism board was to purchase the plot of land in Marina Centre from the Singapore Land Authority, and lease it to Singapore Flyer Pte Ltd for 30 years with an option to extend the lease by another 15 years. The land was to be rent-free during the construction phase of the project. In July 2003, Jones Lang LaSalle was appointed as the real estate advisor. Takenaka and Mitsubishi were selected as the main contractors, and Arup as the structural engineer.

In April 2005, it was announced that the completion of the Flyer was delayed to the end of 2007, instead of the end of 2005, due to financing issues by the developer. In September, two German banks, Delbrueck Bethmann Maffei, the private banking arm of ABN Amro, and Bayerische Hypo- und Vereinsbank, funded $240 million resolving the financial issues faced by the developer.

The groundbreaking ceremony was held on 27 September with Minister for National Development Mah Bow Tan as guest of honour. The spindle was fitted on 13 December 2006, and the outer rim was completed on 9 April 2007. Installation of the passenger capsules began on 3 August and was completed on 2 October.

In August 2007, Florian Bollen, Singapore Flyer Pte Ltd chairman, raised his stake in the Singapore Flyer from 60% to 90% through acquisition of Melchers Project Management's 30% stake. The deal was done via AAA Equity Holdings, a private investment vehicle headed by Bollen. Orient & Pacific Management, which spearheaded the project development management, owns the remaining 10%.

The Flyer opened in 2008. During Chinese New Year, corporate 'inaugural flights' were held from 11 to 13 February, tickets for which sold out for S$8,888, an auspicious number in Eastern culture. The first public rides were on Valentine's Day, 14 February, the soft launch on 1 March, and the official opening on 15 April, at which Prime Minister Lee Hsien Loong was the guest of honour.

In end May 2013, the Flyer was placed under receivership after failing to repay financial obligations to its financing banks. In July, Merlin Entertainments, operator of the London Eye was interested to acquire the Flyer but the ideas were abandoned by May 2014.

On 28 August 2014, Straco Leisure Pte Ltd announced the acquisition of Singapore Flyer at S$140 million after embezzlement and financial issues with the now defunct predecessor company, Great Wheel Corporation. Straco Leisure Pte Ltd is 90% owned by Straco Corporation Limited, a Singaporean listed company that operates tourist attractions in China such as the Shanghai Ocean Aquarium and Underwater World Xiamen. The remaining 10% is owned by WTS Leisure Pte Ltd, one of the largest private tour bus operators in Singapore.

== Design ==
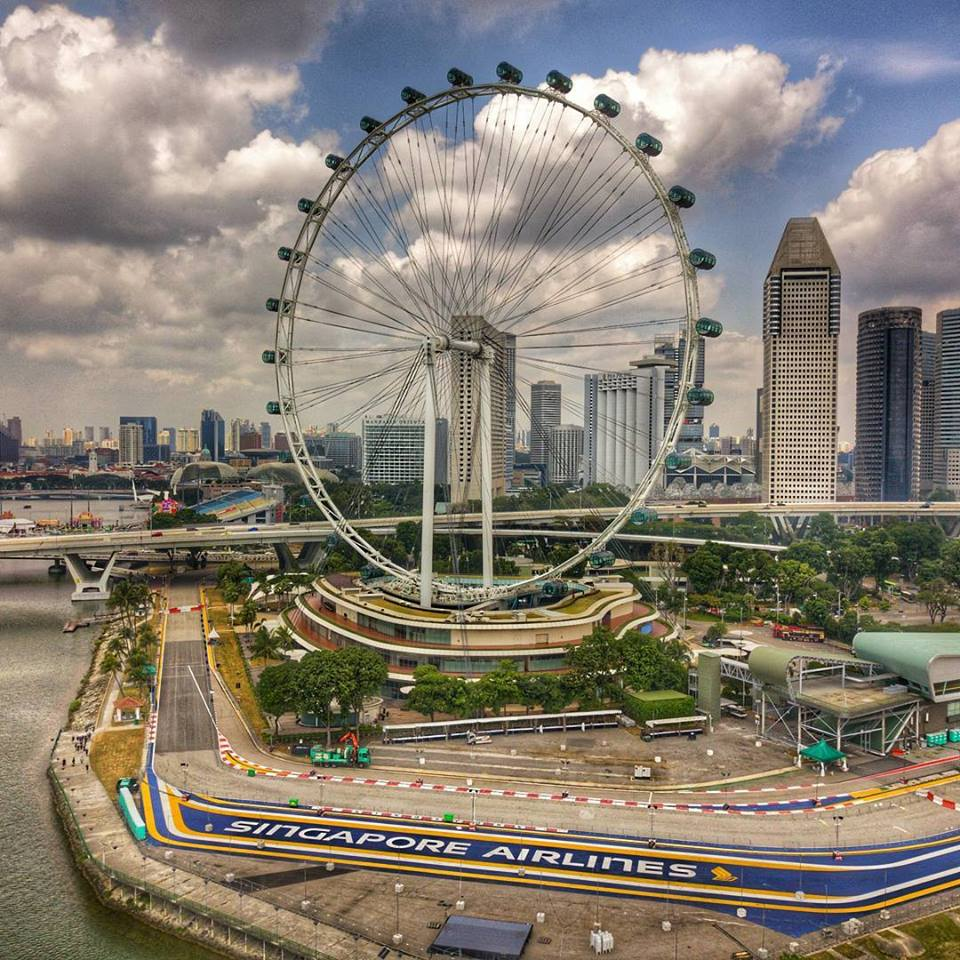
Aerial perspective of the Singapore Flyer during the Chingay Festival preparations, February 2018. The last two corners of the Marina Bay Street Circuit are visible, indicated by the Singapore Airlines branding.

The development has a gross building area of approximately 16,000 m^{2} (172,000 sq ft), built on a 33,700 m^{2} (362,700 sq ft) site along the Marina Promenade. Designed by Arup and Mitsubishi Heavy Industries with a capacity of up to 7.3 million passengers a year, the normally constant rotation of the wheel means that a complete trip lasts approximately 32 minutes.

The Flyer's 28 air-conditioned capsules are mounted outboard of the rim of the wheel structure, providing continuously unobstructed views. Each capsule has a floor area of 26 m^{2} (280 sq ft) and is capable of holding 28 passengers, or up to five wheelchairs and 15 other visitors when booked in advance for use by disabled guests.

The wheel initially rotated in an anti-clockwise direction when viewed from Marina Centre, but on 4 August 2008 the rotation was reversed on the advice of Feng shui masters.

Wheelchair ramps and lifts, handicapped toilets and a dedicated car park for the disabled are also provided.

== Incidents ==
On 4 December 2008, about 70 people were stranded on the wheel for nearly five hours due to bad weather.

At 4.50 pm on 23 December 2008, the Flyer suffered its fourth electrical issues with an electrical fire in the control room of the Flyer causing a technical malfunction, leading the Flyer to stop. 173 passengers were stranded in the capsules. Ten passengers were evacuated from the Flyer via ropes, one at a time, while the remaining passengers eventually left the Flyer after it resumed operation about six hours later at 11.10 pm. Two passengers were hospitalised and were discharged the next morning.

The Flyer was closed by the police for investigation into the fire. During the closure, repair works on the Flyer and new backup systems were implemented. It was later reopened on 26 January 2009.

On 25 January 2018, the Flyer was suspended after an issue was found with the mechanism which allows the wheel to rotate. 61 Passengers were evacuated from the ride. The issue was believed not to have caused any structural issues with the wheel nor the cabins. The Flyer was reopened about two months later on 1 April.

On 20 January 2022, the Flyer was suspended again after detection of a technical issue during a routine maintenance inspection.

== In media ==
- The Bloomberg Television series High Flyers is filmed in one of the Flyer's capsules.
- The Flyer was featured in a task on the sixteenth season of the American reality show The Amazing Race as well as during the finale of the first season of the Australian variant The Amazing Race Australia.
- The Flyer appears in the music video for the 2011 song "Hands Up" by South Korean boy group 2PM.
- The Flyer was featured in two Detective Conan films, once in the 2016 film The Darkest Nightmare, and another time in the 2019 film The Fist of Blue Sapphire.
- The Flyer makes an appearance in the 2018 film, Crazy Rich Asians, based on the novel of the same name by Kevin Kwan.
- The Flyer was featured and visited by South Korean band Twice for their TWICE TV series (TWICE TV6) when they were in Singapore.
- The Flyer will appear in HBO series Euphoria, as part of the third season.

== Gallery ==
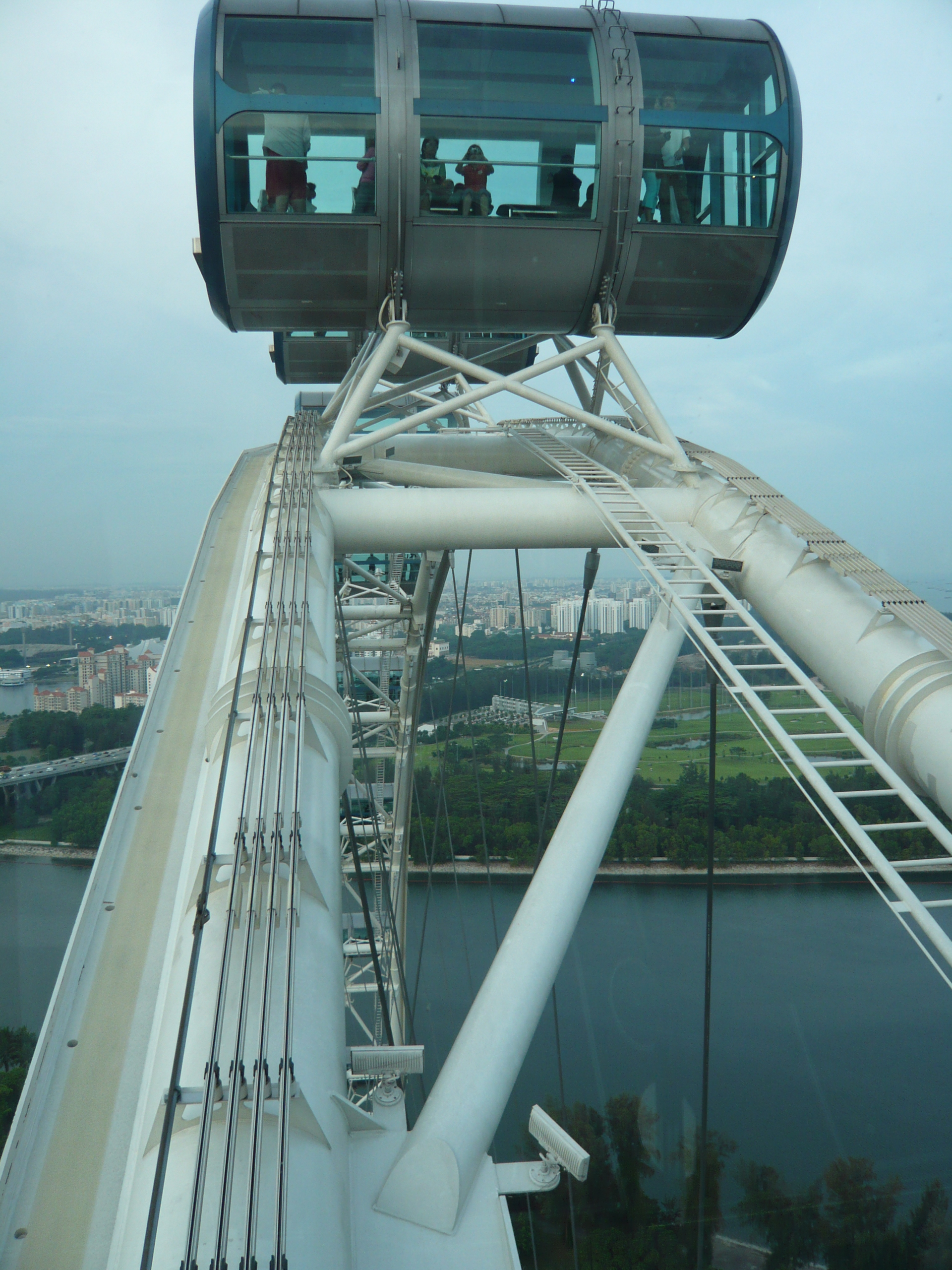
Exterior view inside a capsule

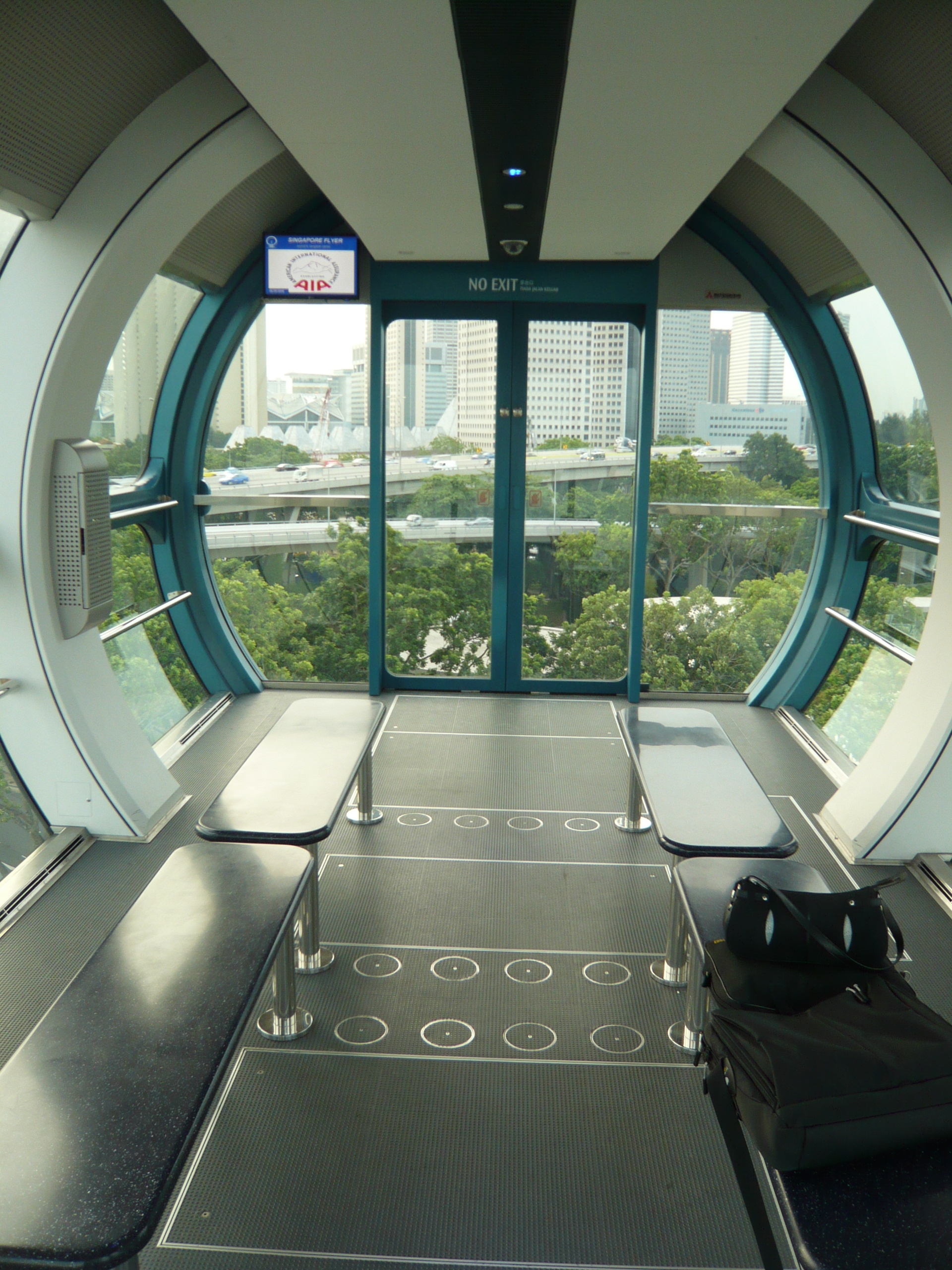
View within a capsule

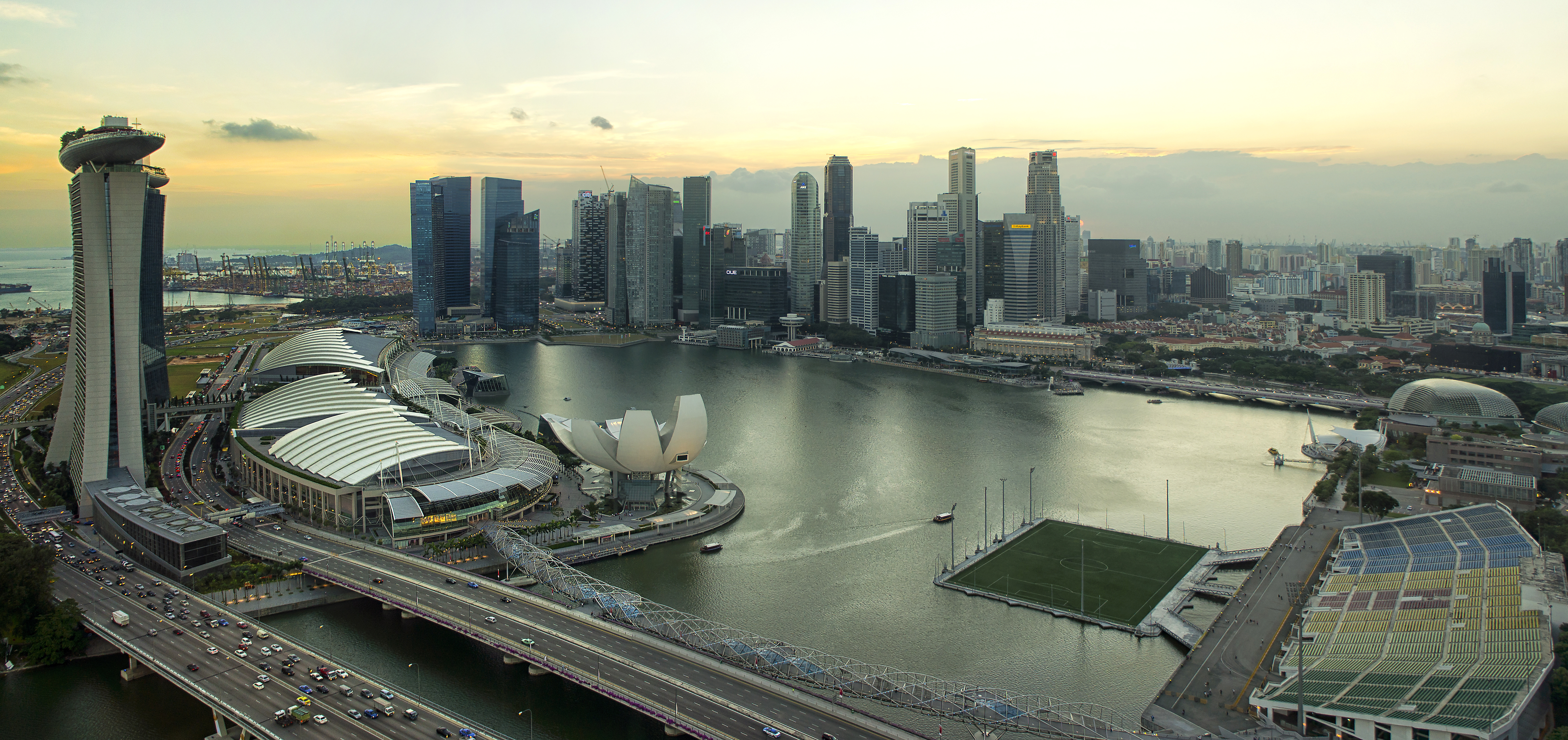
Marina Bay in 2012, one of the many views from the Flyer's capsules

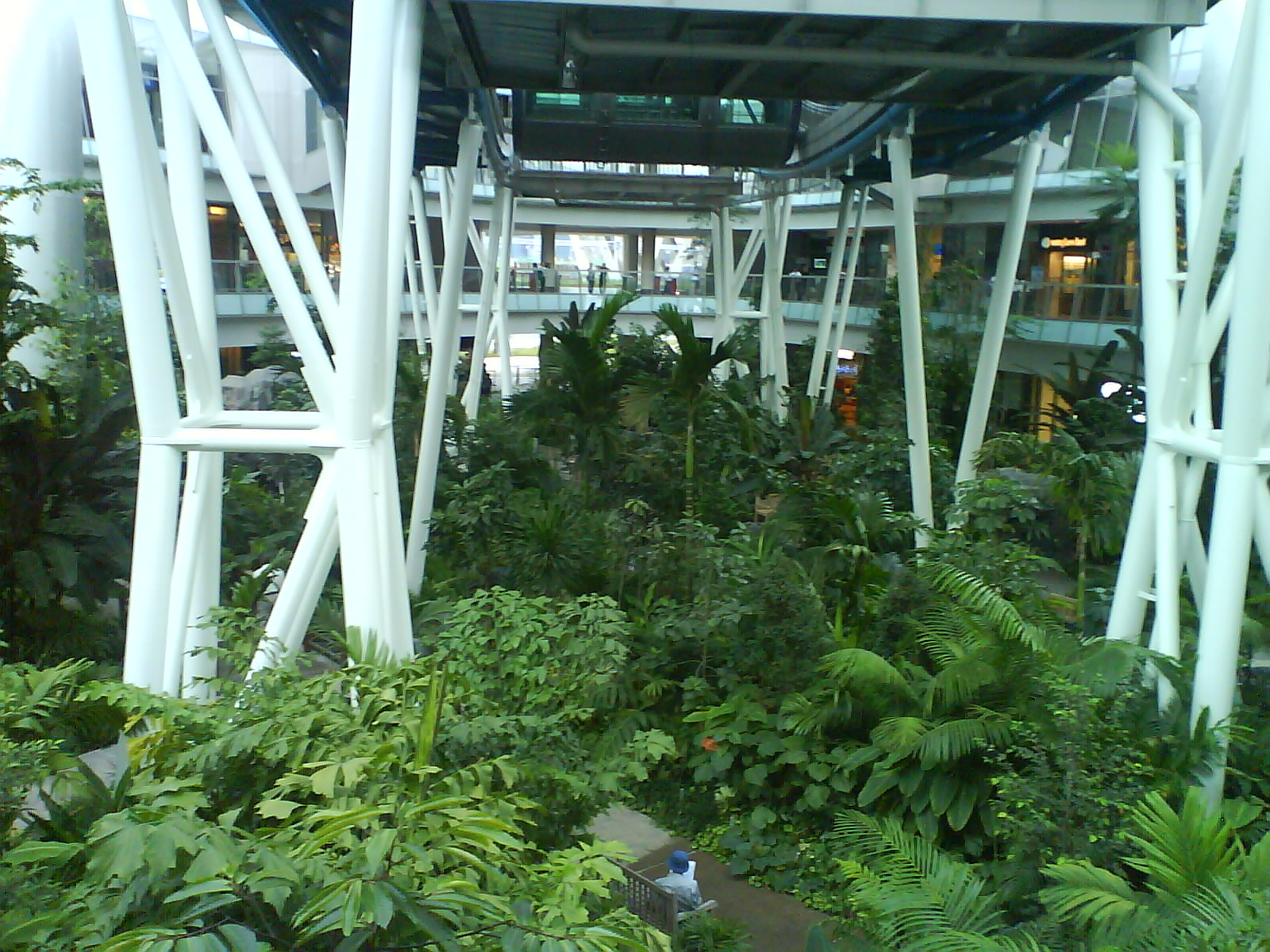
The site includes a tropical rainforest garden

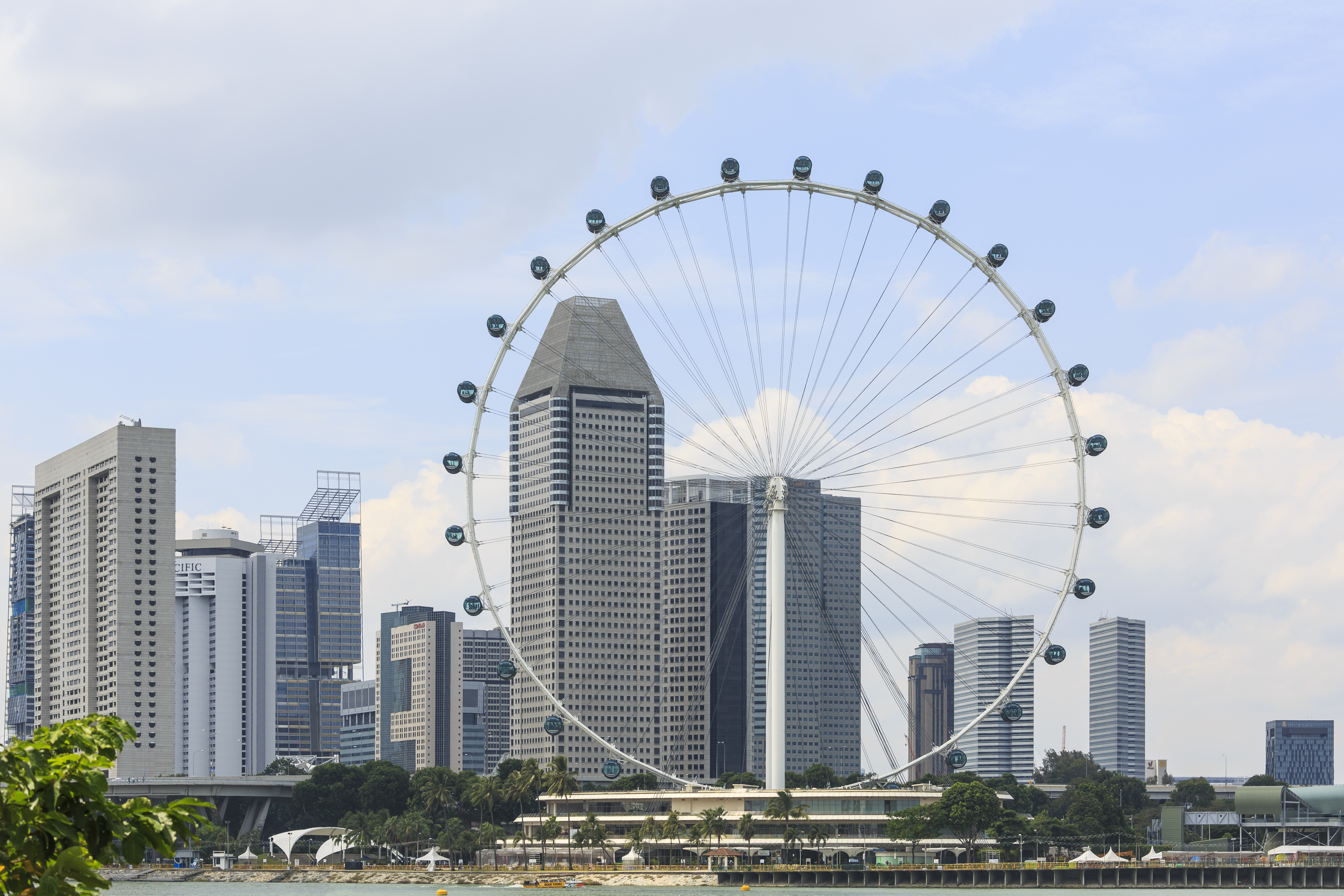
Singapore Flyer in the day

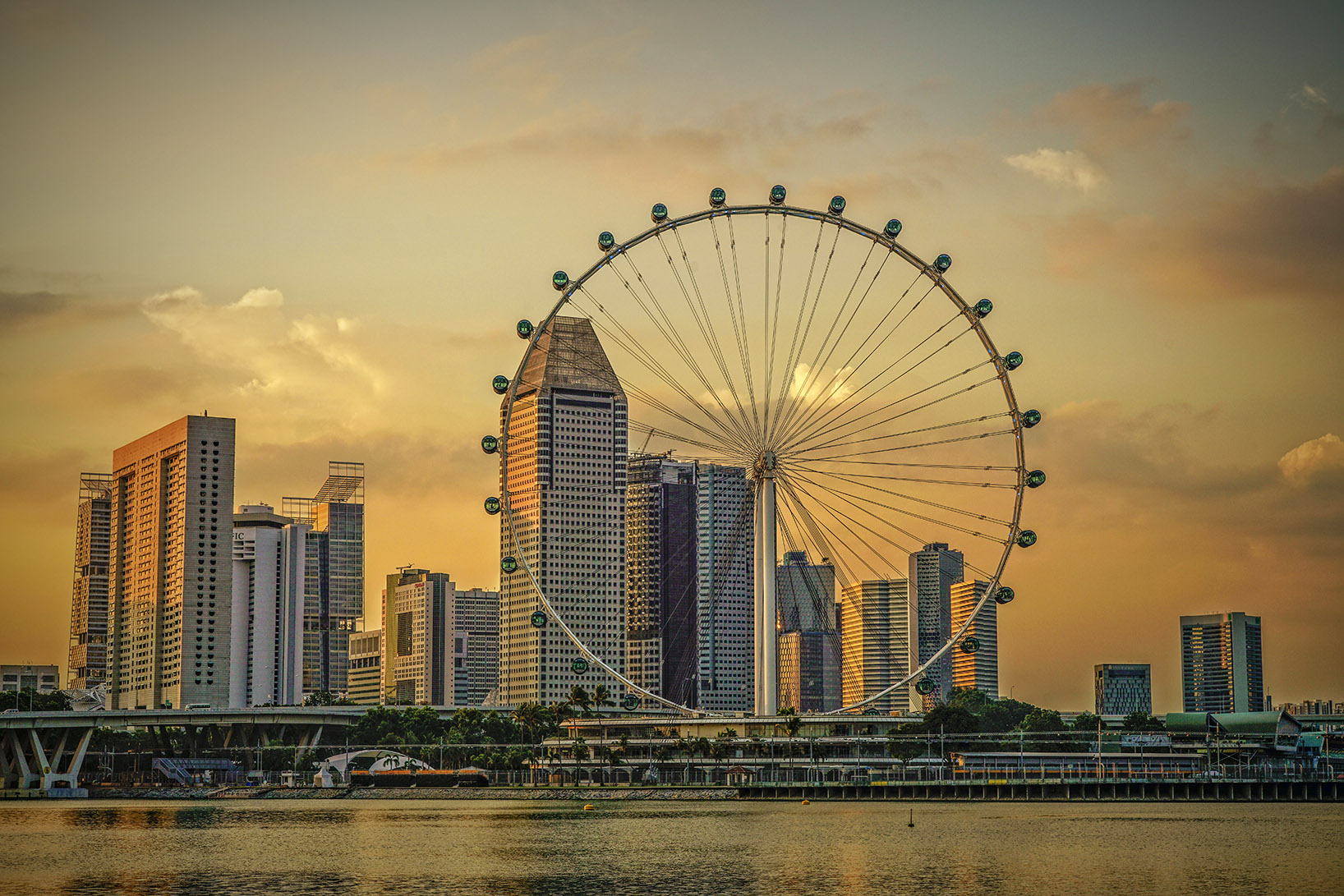
Singapore Skyline at Sunset from Gardens by the Bay

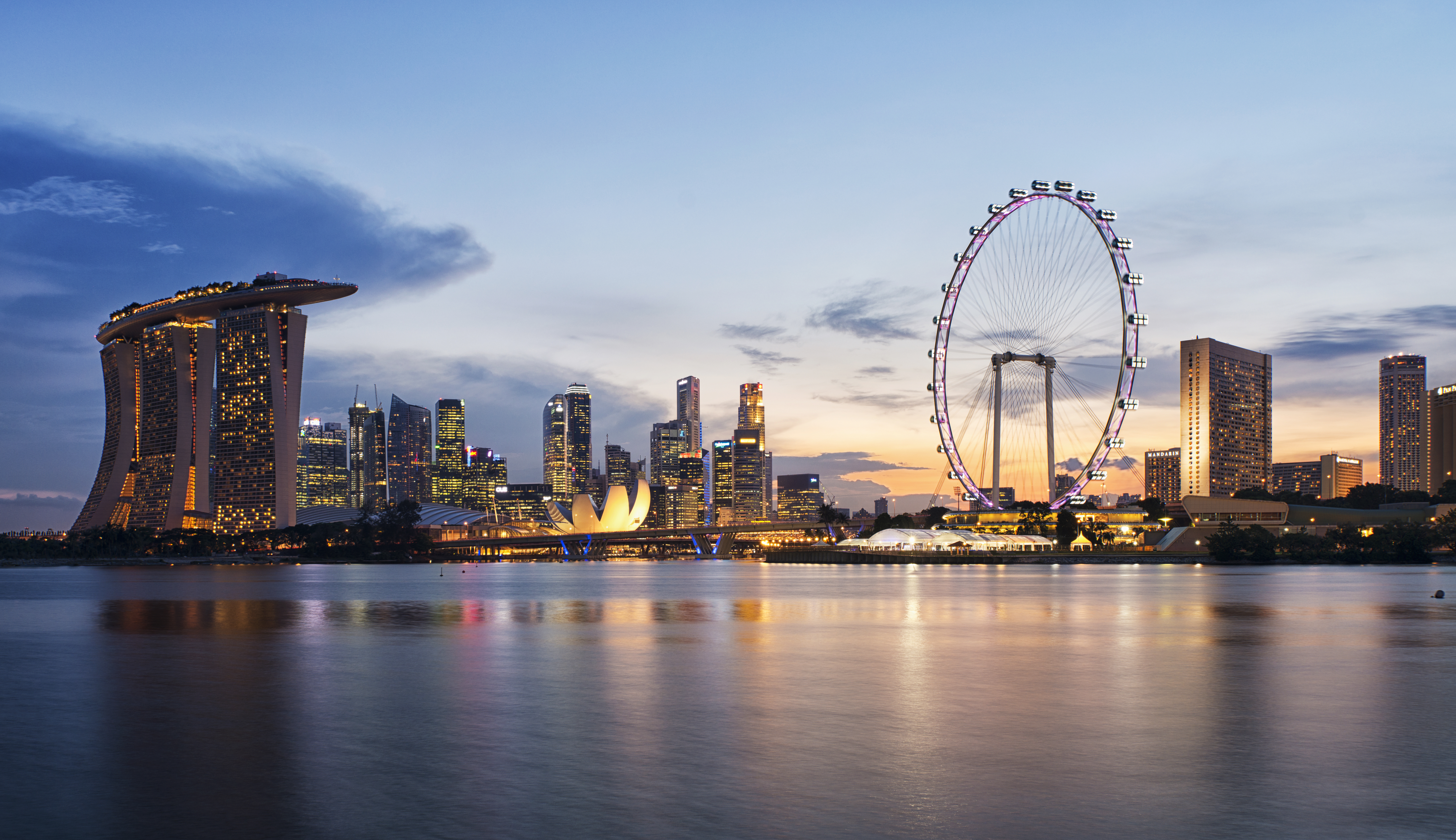
A view of Singapore Flyer at Dusk, 2012

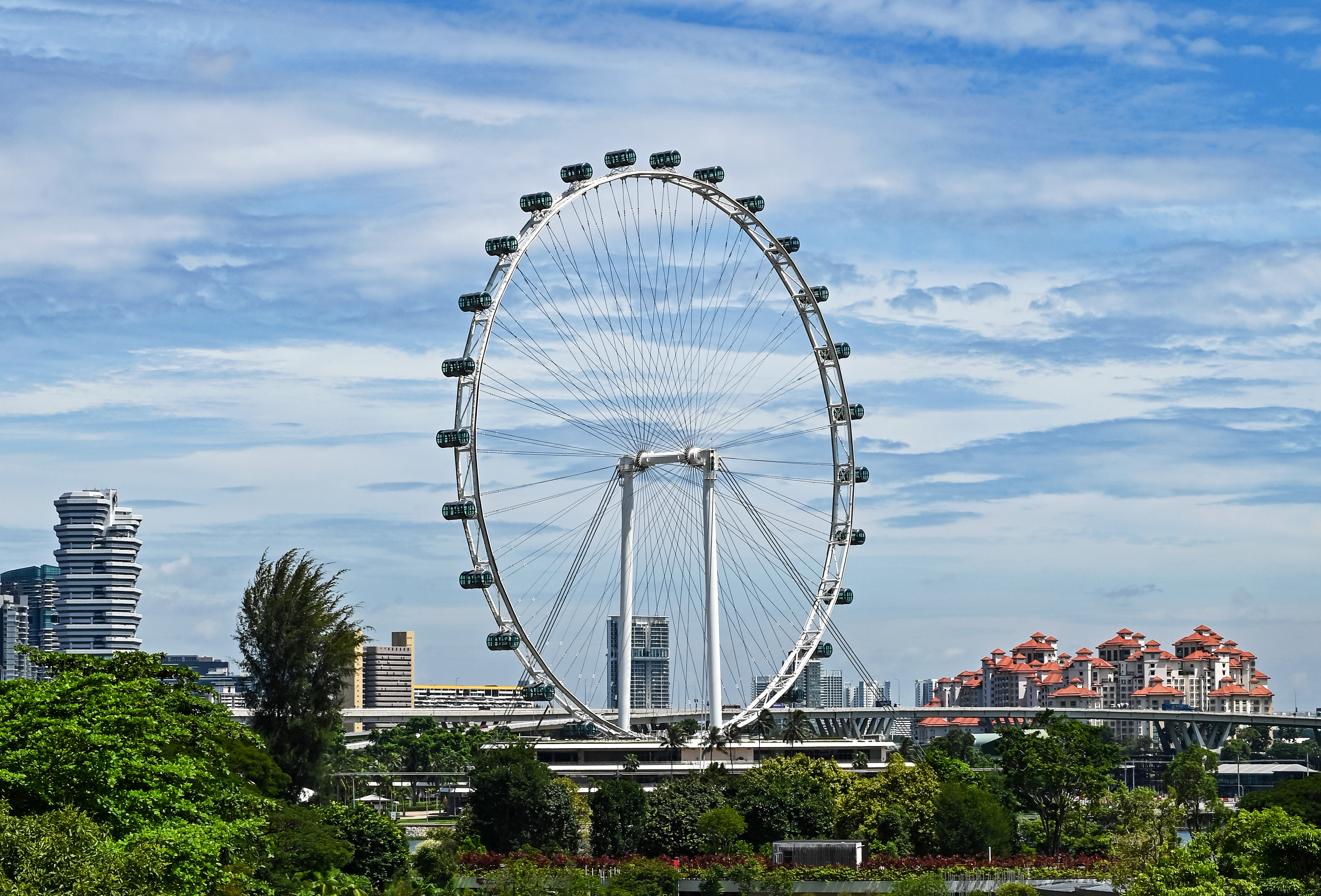
From Gardens by the Bay

== Notes and references ==
=== References ===
Preceded by Star of Nanchang	World's tallest Ferris wheel 2008–2014	Succeeded by High Roller
