= Lay Zhang discography =

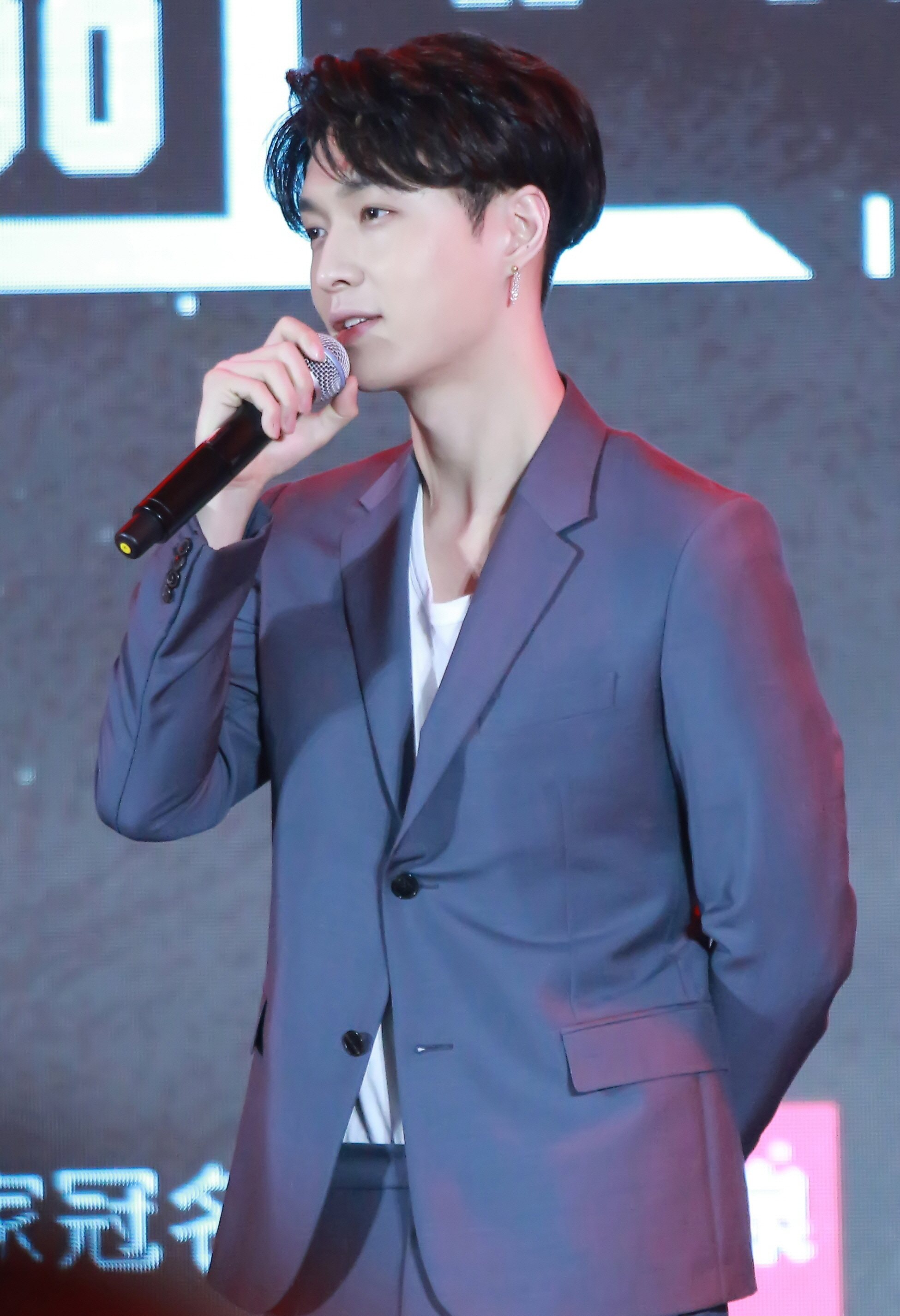
- Zhang in 2017
- Studio albums: 6
- EPs: 4
- Singles: 30
- Collaborations: 7
- Soundtrack appearances: 5
- Music videos: 11

Chinese singer Lay Zhang (Zhang Yixing) has released six studio albums, five extended plays, thirty singles and five soundtrack appearances. In May 2016, he released his first solo single called "Monodrama" for the Station project. Zhang made his official solo debut on October 7, 2016, with the release of the song "What U Need?". His first extended play, titled Lose Control, was released on October 28 of the same year. The EP was a commercial success, peaking at number 1 on the Gaon Album Chart and placing seventh on the list of best-selling albums of 2016.

== Albums ==
=== Studio albums ===
List of studio albums, with selected details and chart positions
Title	Details	Peak chart positions					Sales
Title	Details	KOR	FRA Dig.	JPN	US	US World	Sales
Lay 02 Sheep	Released: October 7, 2017; Labels: SM, Zhang Yixing Studio; Formats: CD, digital download, streaming	10	—	7	—	2	CHN: 1,008,000 (dig.); KOR: 22,768; JPN: 770
Namanana	Released: October 19, 2018; Label: SM, Zhang Yixing Studio; Formats: CD, digital download, streaming	—	161	—	21	1	CHN: 1,180,208 (dig.); US: 24,000
Lit	Lit Part. 1; Released: June 1, 2020; Label: SM, Zhang Yixing Studio; Format: Digital download, streaming	—	—	—	—	—	CHN: 2,741,096 (dig.)
Lit	Lit Part. 2; Released: July 21, 2020; Label: SM, Zhang Yixing Studio; Format: Digital download, streaming	—	—	—	—	—	CHN: 2,741,096 (dig.)
Producer	Released: February 5, 2021; Label: SM, Zhang Yixing Studio; Formats: Digital download, streaming	—	—	—	—	—	
Step	Released: June 14, 2024; Label: Zhang Yixing Studio; Formats: Digital download, streaming	—	—	—	—	—	CHN: 555,000 (dig.)
Rock the Heavenly Palace	Released: September 7, 2025; Label: Zhang Yixing Studio; Formats: Digital download, streaming	TBA	TBA	TBA	TBA	TBA	
"—" denotes releases that did not chart or were not released in that region.

=== Single albums ===
List of single albums, with selected details and chart positions
Title	Details	Sales
Dawn to Dusk (with 24kGoldn)	Released: February 22, 2022; Label: SM Entertainment, Zhang Yixing Studio; Formats: Digital download, streaming	CHN: 190,481 (dig.)

== Extended plays ==
List of extended plays, with selected chart positions and sales
Title	Details	Peak chart positions				Sales
Title	Details	KOR	JPN	US Heat	US World	Sales
Lose Control	Released: October 28, 2016; Label: SM Entertainment, Zhang Yixing Studio; Formats: CD, digital download, streaming	1	8	1	4	CHN: 1,197,813 (dig.); KOR: 281,360; JPN: 89,432
Winter Special Gift	Released: December 22, 2017; Label: SM Entertainment, Zhang Yixing Studio; Format: Digital download, streaming	—	—	—	8	CHN: 911,110 (dig.)
Honey	Released: June 14, 2019; Label: SM Entertainment, Zhang Yixing Studio; Format: Digital download, streaming	—	—	—	11	CHN: 4,854,543 (dig.)
East	Released: October 15, 2021; Label: SM Entertainment, Zhang Yixing Studio; Format: Digital download, streaming	—	—	—	—	CHN: 882,776 (dig.)
West	Released: September 24, 2022; Label: Zhang Yixing Studio; Format: Digital download, streaming	—	—	—	—	
"—" denotes releases that did not chart or were not released in that region.

== Singles ==
List of singles, with selected chart positions, showing year released and album name
Title	Year	Peak chart positions			Sales	Album
Title	Year	CHN (Note: The Billboard China Top 100 operated from January to September 2019. The TME UNI Chart was launched in September 2018; chart positions for "Namanana" and later refer to the TME chart.)	KOR	US World	Sales	Album
"Monodrama" (独角戏)	2016	—N/a	155	1	—N/a	SM Station Season 1
"What U Need?"	2016	—N/a	— (Note: "What U Need?" charted at number 41 on the Gaon International Digital Chart.)	1	KOR: 4,242	Lose Control
"Lose Control" (失控)	2016	—N/a	— (Note: "Lose Control" charted at number 52 on the Gaon International Digital Chart.)	—	CHN: 36,300; KOR: 6,691	Lose Control
"I Need U" (需要你)	2017	—N/a	—	7	—N/a	Lay 02 Sheep
"Sheep" (羊)	2017	—N/a	—	—	—N/a	Lay 02 Sheep
"Goodbye Christmas"	2017	—N/a	—	—	—N/a	Winter Special Gift
"Sheep" (Alan Walker Relift)	2018	64	— (Note: "Sheep (Alan Walker Relift)" charted at number 11 on the Gaon International Digital Chart.)	—	CHN: 35,400	Non-album single
"Give Me a Chance" (爱到这)	2018	7	—	—	CHN: 87,600	Namanana
"Namanana" (梦不落雨林)	2018	2	—	—	—N/a	Namanana
"When It's Christmas"	2018	4	—	—	—N/a	Non-album single
"Honey"	2019	4	—	—	—N/a	Honey
"I'm Not Well" (我不好)	2019	1	—	—	—N/a	Non-album singles
"Grandma" (外婆)	2019	4	—	—	—N/a	Non-album singles
"Jade" (玉)	2020	1	—	—	—N/a	Lit
"Lit" (莲)	2020	1	—	11	—N/a	Lit
"Gluttony" (饕餮)	2020	3	—	—	—N/a	Non-album single
"Joker"	2021	6	—	—	—N/a	Producer
"Samadhi Real Fire" (三昧真火)	2021	10	—	—	—N/a	East
"Flying Apsaras" (飞天)	2021	3	—	—	—N/a	East
"Jiu" (酒)	2022	2	—	—	—N/a	Non-album single
"Veil" (面纱)	2022	3	—	—	—N/a	West
"Nothing With Me" (沒什麼能給你)	2022	5	—	—	—N/a	Non-album single
"Right Back"	2023!	51	—	—	—N/a	D.N.A
"Run Back to You" (with Lauv)	2024	3	—	—	—N/a	Step
"Psychic"	2024	5	— (Note: "Psychic" (Korean Ver.) did not enter the Circle Digital Chart, but peaked at number 110 on the Circle Download Chart.)	—	—N/a	Step
"What About Love"	2024	—	—	—	—N/a	Non-album singles
"Kai Tian"	2025	—	—	—	—N/a	Non-album singles
"Easy" (with Jvke)	2025	50	—	—	—N/a	Non-album singles
"—" denotes releases that did not chart or were not released in that region.

=== Promotional singles ===
Title	Year	Album
"I'm Coming"	2014	Non-album single
"Dream High" (夢想起飛)	2017	SPD Bank Theme Song

== Collaborations ==
Title	Year	Peak chart positions				Sales	Album
Title	Year	CHN	KOR	NZ Hot.	US World	Sales	Album
"Let's Shut Up & Dance" (with Jason Derulo and NCT 127)	2019	35	— (Note: "Let's Shut Up & Dance" did not enter the Gaon Digital Chart, but its physical version appeared at number 32 on the Album Chart.)	34	—	CHN: 300,000; KOR: 3,952 (Phy.)	Non-album singles
"No Man's Land" (无人之域) (with Anti-General and Jasmine Sokko)	2019	—	—	—	—	—N/a	Non-album singles
"Lovebird" (with Far East Movement)	2019	—N/a	—	—	—	—N/a	Non-album singles
"Love You More" (Steve Aoki featuring Lay and will.i.am)	2020	—N/a	—	—	—	—N/a	Neon Future IV
"Clear Sky Ballad" (晴空谣) (Panta Q featuring Lay)	2020	—N/a	—	—	—	—N/a	Non-album single
"Break My Heart" (with Vinida Weng and Gali)	2023	—N/a	—	—	—	—N/a	D.N.A
"Racks on Me" (with Danko and Boogie)	2023	—N/a	—	—	—	—N/a	D.N.A
"—" denotes releases that did not chart or were not released in that region.

== Other appearances ==
Title	Year	Album
"Because of You"	2013	Non-album single
"I'm Lay"	2014	Exology Chapter 1: The Lost Planet
"Youth Day" (theme song)	2018	Non-album single

== Other charted songs ==
Title	Year	Peak chart positions		Sales	Album
Title	Year	CHN	KOR	Sales	Album
"Relax"	2016	—N/a	— (Note: "Relax" charted at number 100 on the Gaon International Digital Chart.)	KOR: 2,529	Lose Control
"MYM"	2016	—N/a	— (Note: "MYM" charted at number 94 on the Gaon International Digital Chart.)	KOR: 2,667	Lose Control
"MYM" (acoustic ver.)	2016	—N/a	—	KOR: 2,457	Lose Control
"Tonight"	2016	—N/a	— (Note: "Tonight" charted at number 96 on the Gaon International Digital Chart.)	KOR: 2,602	Lose Control
"Mapo Tofu" (麻婆豆腐)	2018	6	—	—N/a	Namanana
"—" denotes releases that did not chart or were not released in that region.

== Soundtrack appearances ==
Title	Year	Album
"Happy Youth" (with Coco Jiang Wen and Li Xiaolu)	2015	Oh My God OST
"Alone (One Person)"	2015	Ex Files 2: The Backup Strikes Back OST
"A Man Thing" (with Royal Treasure cast)	2016	Royal Treasure OST
"Pray"	2017	Operation Love OST
"Everything Like You"	2018	I'm Around You OST

== Music videos ==
Title	Year	Ref.
As lead artist
"Monodrama"	2016	
"What U Need?"	2016	
"Lose Control"	2016	
"I Need U"	2017	
"Sheep (羊)"	2017	
"Goodbye Christmas (聖誕又至)"	2017	
"Sheep (Alan Walker Relift)"	2018	
"Give Me a Chance"	2018	
"Namanana"	2018	
"Honey"	2019	
"Grandma (外婆)"	2019	
"Lit (莲)"	2020	
"Veil"	2022	
As Collaborating artist
"Let's Shut Up and Dance"	2019	
Guest appearances
"Missing You" (remake; Fly to the Sky)	2014	
"Youth Day" (theme song)	2018	

== See also ==
- Exo discography
- List of songs recorded by Exo
