= What U Need? =

"what U need?"

Single by Lay

from the album Lose Control
- Released: October 7, 2016
- Recorded: 2016
- Studio: Zhang Yixing studio
- Genre: C-pop; R&B
- Length: 4:00
- Label: SM
- Songwriters: Lay, CC
- Producers: Devine Channel, Lay

Lay singles chronology
"Monodrama" (2016)	"what U need?" (2016)	"Lose Control" (2016)

Music video
- "what U need?" on YouTube

"what U need?" is a single recorded by Chinese singer Lay for his debut extended play Lose Control . It was pre-released on October 7, 2016, by S.M. Entertainment as a birthday gift for Lay's fans.

== Background and release ==
Produced by Devine Channel and Lay, "what U need?" is described as a "Pop-R&B" song with lyrics about being overwhelmed by a loved one.

== Music video ==
"what U need?" music video was released on October 7, 2016. It features Lay with backup dancers dancing the song's choreography.

== Live performance ==
Lay performed "what U need?" for the first time on October 9 at the 2016 Asia Song Festival in Busan, South Korea. "what U need?" was performed together with "Lose Control" at the SMG New Year's Eve Gala 2017 in Baoshan Sports Centre, Shanghai on December 31, 2016.

== Reception ==
"what U need" stayed at #1 on the Alibaba Real Time Music Chart in China for three consecutive weeks. The single and the music video appeared at the top of music charts in China, Hong Kong, Japan, Malaysia, Thailand, UK, Turkey, Canada and the United States.

The song hit the #4 spot on the China V Chart as well as in Billboard's World Digital Songs. Additionally, the song ranked #1 on Alibaba Year-End Top 40 Music Chart for 2016. It ranked #45 on Xiami's Top 100 Most Popular Singles of 2016 in China.

== Charts ==
Chart (2016)	Peak position
Chinese Singles (Billboard)	4
South Korean singles (Gaon)	— (Note: "what U need?" charted at number 41 on the Gaon International Digital Chart.)
US World Digital Songs (Billboard)	4

== Sales ==
Region	Sales
South Korea (Gaon)	4,242
