= List of Billboard China V Chart top 10 albums of 2016 =

The following is a list of the best selling albums of 2016 on the Billboard China V Chart. The chart ranks in two different categories, mainland albums and imported albums using data from Chinese video-sharing site YinYueTai (YYT).

== Criteria ==
=== Chart entry criteria ===
There is no time limit imposed for (domestic) albums released within mainland China. For the album still sells on the Yin Yue Shopping Mall, the album is eligible to be ranked in the weekly album chart. The classification of albums into mainland and foreign albums depend on the country/location the album was released and not the language.

==== Structure ====
The chart cycle for real time chart is updated hourly while the weekly and yearly album charts are updated every month and year respectively.

The real time chart shows only ranking without the number of sales.

The weekly chart shows only the top50 ranking albums in the month and the number of sales for only the top5 albums.

The yearly chart shows only the top50 ranking albums in the year and its number of sales. The chart is published at the subsequent year on 1 January.

==== Loop holes ====
1. Pre-order sales for a specific album will only be counted on the release date.
2. If a single album is divided into multiple editions, the sales will be counted separately.

== Top 10 albums of 2016 ==
Mainland (Domestic)				Imported			
Rank	Album	Artist(s)	Reference	Rank	Album	Artist(s)	Reference
1	Beginner	Joker Xue		1	Lose Control (Note: Album first released outside of China although it is a Chinese language album by a Chinese artist)	Zhang Yixing (Lay)	
2	Adore	Huang Zitao		2	VOL.3 [EX’ACT] (KOREAN VER.)	EXO	
3	Whirlwind	Chen Xiang		3	VOL.3 [EX’ACT] (CHINESE VER.)	EXO	
4	December (W Edition)	Wang Qing		4	FLIGHT LOG : TURBULENCE VOL.2	GOT7	
5	December (Q Edition)	Wang Qing		5	WINTER SPECIAL ALBUM 2016 (2CD)	EXO	
6	Reloaded	Luhan (Note: Only album in the list which is released in 2015)		6	WINGSVOL.2	BTS	
7	The Road	Huang Zitao		7	VOL.3 Repackage [LOTTO] (CHINESE VER.)	EXO	
8	$axi$a	Hooleeger		8	VOL.3 Repackage [LOTTO] (KOREAN VER.)	EXO	
9	N/A	N/A		9	BIGBANG MADE THE FULL ALBUM	Bigbang	
10	JTW: Journey to The West	Khalil Fong		10	Young Forever (Night ver.)	BTS	

== Annual sales percentage ==
=== Mainland (Domestic) albums ===
Rank	Album	Artist	Percentage of mainland albums
1	Beginner	Joker Xue	33.26%
2	Adore	Huang Zitao	23.23%
3	Whirlwind	Chen Xiang	12.74%
4	December (W Edition)	Wang Qing	5.98%
5	December (Q Edition)	Wang Qing	5.66%

=== Imported albums ===
Rank	Album	Artist	Percentage of imported albums
1	Lose Control	Zhang Yixing (Lay)	69.71%
2	VOL.3 [EX’ACT] (KOREAN VER.)	EXO	4.08%
3	VOL.3 [EX’ACT] (CHINESE VER.)	EXO	2.91%
4	FLIGHT LOG : TURBULENCE VOL.2	GOT7	2.52%
5	WINTER SPECIAL ALBUM 2016 (2CD)	EXO	1.49%
