= Honey (Lay EP) =

EP by Lay
- Released: June 14, 2019
- Studio: Zhang Yixing Studio, China
- Genre: Hip-hop; R&B
- Length: 12:23
- Language: English; Mandarin Chinese
- Label: SM; Zhang Yixing Studio
- Producer: Lay

Lay chronology
| Namanana (2018) | Honey (2019) | Lit (2020) |

Singles from Honey
- 1. "Honey" Released: June 14, 2019

Honey is the third extended play by Chinese singer Lay. It was released digitally on June 14, 2019. The EP features four tracks, including the title track "Honey" with English and Chinese versions.

== Background and release ==
On April 30, Lay teased about the artwork of Honey on Instagram. On May 20, Lay released a teaser of Honey music video through his social media accounts. On June 6, it was confirmed that the official pre-sale for the EP on QQ Music would be on June 11, 2019, and it would be released officially on June 14. On June 10, the track list of the EP were released by Lay Zhang Studio on their social media accounts. On June 13, the second teaser for the "Honey" music video was released. On June 14, the EP was officially released along with "Honey" music video.

== Commercial performance ==
On June 11, the pre-order of the EP started on QQ Music. Within three minutes, the album had sold more than 2,375,945 million copies and was certified Hall of fame gold diamond, making it the best selling release on the QQ Music digital chart in 2019.

== Track listing ==
| No. | Title | Lyrics | Music | Arrangement | Length |
|---|---|---|---|---|---|
| 1. | "Honey" (和你) (English version) | Lay; Blaq Tuxedo; DJ White Shadow | Lay; Dominique Logan; Darius Logan; Swiff D; DJ White Shadow | Lay; Swiff D | 3:03 |
| 2. | "Bad" (坏的) | Jackson Foote | Lay; Jackson Foote | Lay; Jackson Foote; Coach & Sendo | 1:58 |
| 3. | "Amusement Park" (游乐园) | Terence Coles | Lay; Terence Coles; Ozzie; Kyle "Kxhris" Coleman; Hue "Soundzfire" Strother; VMP | Lay; Ozzie; Kyle "Kxhris" Coleman; Hue "Soundzfire" Strother; VMP | 4:19 |
| 4. | "Honey" (和你) (Chinese version) | Lay; Blaq Tuxedo; DJ White Shadow | Lay; Dominique Logan; Darius Logan; Swiff D; DJ White Shadow | Lay; Swiff D | 3:03 |
| Total length: | | | | | 12:23 |

== Charts ==
=== Weekly charts ===
| Chart (2019) | Peak position |
|---|---|
| US World Albums (Billboard) | 11 |

== Sales ==
| Region | Sales |
|---|---|
| China (QQ Music+Kuwo+Kugou) | 4,809,882 |

== Release history ==
| Region | Date | Format | Label |
|---|---|---|---|
| China | June 14, 2019 | Digital download; streaming | SM; Zhang Yixing Studio |
| South Korea | June 14, 2019 | Digital download; streaming | SM; Zhang Yixing Studio |
| United States | June 14, 2019 | Digital download; streaming | SM; Zhang Yixing Studio |
| Various | June 14, 2019 | Digital download; streaming | SM; Zhang Yixing Studio |
