= List of Billboard China V Chart number-one videos of 2016 =

The following is a list of the number-one music videos of 2016 on the weekly Billboard China V Chart. The chart ranks weekly most viewed music videos using data from Chinese video-sharing site YinYueTai (YYT).

== Chart history ==
Issue date	Song	Artist(s)	Reference
January 2	"Big Dreamers"	TFBoys	
January 9	"Big Dreamers"	TFBoys	
January 16	"Big Dreamers"	TFBoys	
January 23	"Big Dreamers"	TFBoys	
January 30	"Big Dreamers"	TFBoys	
February 6	"Aliens"	Hua Chenyu	
February 13	"Aliens"	Hua Chenyu	
February 20	"Aliens"	Hua Chenyu	
February 27	"Aliens"	Hua Chenyu	
March 5	"Aliens"	Hua Chenyu	
March 12	"You Get Me"	Huang Lige	
March 19	"Zero Gravity"	ZERO-G	
March 26	"Excited (Dance Ver.)"	Luhan	
April 2	"Sketch"	Hyomin	
April 9	"Sketch"	Hyomin	
April 16	"Sketch"	Hyomin	
April 23	"Sketch"	Hyomin	
April 30	"Sketch"	Hyomin	
May 7	"Sketch"	Hyomin	
May 14	"Go For The Light"	Timmy Xu	
May 21	"Go For The Light"	Timmy Xu	
May 28	"Summer Hair Dance"	Yang Yang	
June 4	"Go For The Light"	Timmy Xu	
June 11	"Monodrama"	Lay	
June 18	"Monodrama"	Lay	
June 25	"Monodrama"	Lay	
July 2	"Monodrama"	Lay	
July 9	"Hong"	Feng Jianyu	
July 16	"Monodrama"	Lay	
July 23	"Hong"	Feng Jianyu	
July 30	"Hong"	Feng Jianyu	
August 6	"Miss Of Sky Wheel"	Karry Wang	
August 13	"Miss Of Sky Wheel"	Karry Wang	
August 20	"Miss Of Sky Wheel"	Karry Wang	
August 27	"The Furthest Distance"	Hwang Chi-yeul	
September 3	"Miss Of Sky Wheel"	Karry Wang	
September 10	"Miss Of Sky Wheel"	Karry Wang	
September 17	"The Furthest Distance"	Hwang Chi-yeul	
September 24	"$AXI$A"	Hoo Leeger	
October 1	"Chang Sheng Ge"	Wang Qing	
October 8	"Chang Sheng Ge"	Wang Qing	
October 15	"Leisurely"	Wang Qing	
October 22	"Leisurely"	Wang Qing	
October 29	"Leisurely"	Wang Qing	
November 5	"Leisurely"	Wang Qing	
November 12	"Lose Control"	Lay	
November 19	"Lose Control"	Lay	
November 26	"Lose Control"	Lay	
December 3	"Lose Control"	Lay	
December 10	"Lose Control"	Lay	
December 17	"Lose Control"	Lay	
December 24	"Happiness"	Wang Qing	
December 31	"Happiness"	Wang Qing	
