= Give Me a Chance (Lay song) =

Single by Lay

from the album Namanana
- Language: Mandarin; English
- Released: October 5, 2018
- Recorded: 2018
- Studio: Zhang Yixing Studio
- Genre: Urban pop; R&B
- Length: 3:43
- Label: SM; Zhang Yixing Studio; IRIVER
- Composers: Lay; Andrew Bazzi; Kevin White; Mike Woods
- Lyricists: Andrew Bazzi; Kevin White; Mike Woods; Wang Jing Yun (ZH)
- Producers: Lay; Andrew Bazzi; Kevin White; Mike Woods; MZMC

Lay singles chronology
| "Sheep (Alan Walker Relift)" (2018) | "Give Me a Chance" (2018) | "Namanana" (2018) |

Music video
- "Give Me a Chance" on YouTube

"Give Me a Chance" is a single recorded by Chinese singer Lay for his solo album Namanana. The song was pre-released on October 5, 2018, by SM Entertainment and Zhang Yixing Studio.

== Background and release ==
On September 28, it was announced that Lay would pre-release his song "Give Me a Chance" on October 5, the lyrics and composing of which were co-written and co-composed by Bazzi, and would release the music video of the song on October 7. On October 5, the track was released.

Written and composed by Lay, Bazzi and others, "Give Me a Chance" is described as having a trap beat over a dreamy melody with lyrics about a former lover.

== Music video ==
On October 5, a teaser of the music video of "Give Me a Chance" was released. On October 7, the music video was officially released.

The music video shows Lay dancing along with backup dancers in an industrial setting and on a rooftop.

== Reception ==
"Give Me a Chance" topped the iTunes charts in 16 countries including Hong Kong, Argentina, Finland, and the United Arab Emirates. The single reached the top three on China's music streaming chart QQ Music.

== Charts ==
| Chart (2018) | Peak position |
|---|---|
| China (China Top 100) | 2 |
| China (QQ Music) | 3 |
| Philippines (Music Weekly) | 28 |
| Vietnam (Music Weekly) | 22 |

== Release history ==
| Region | Date | Format | Label |
|---|---|---|---|
| United States | October 5, 2018 | Digital download; streaming | SM; Zhang Yixing Studio |
| China | October 5, 2018 | Digital download; streaming | SM; Zhang Yixing Studio |
| South Korea | October 5, 2018 | Digital download; streaming | SM; Zhang Yixing Studio |
| Various | October 5, 2018 | Digital download; streaming | SM; Zhang Yixing Studio |
