= Easy (Jvke song) =

Single by Jvke feat. Lay

from the album The Asia Tour: Blooming Season EP
- Language: English
- Released: July 25, 2025
- Genre: Synth-pop
- Length: 2:20
- Songwriters: Jvke; Zac Lawson; Lay
- Producers: Jvke; Zac Lawson

Jvke singles chronology
| "Butterflies (feat. Taehyun and Kim Chaewon)" (2025) | "Easy" (2025) | "Oh to Be Loved" (2025) |

Lay singles chronology
| "Kai Tian" (2025) | "Easy" (2025) |

Music video
- "Lyrics Video" on YouTube

"Easy" is a single by American singer-songwriter Jvke and Chinese singer Lay. It released on July 25, 2025.

The song is about someone who is heartbroken after their relationship with their lover ends. Despite this, they still hope to mend fences, avoiding missing each other. The lyrics describe how empty and lonely their life feels without their loved one by their side. However, it seems like this broken relationship can't be fixed, no matter how hard they try.

== Background and release ==
Announced as a surprise single last night, the song is written purely in English. The track itself is a synth-pop heartbreak anthem that tackles the regret that comes with ending a relationship as the two croon in the chorus, "Why, oh, why baby, don't you try? / I walked away and you said, 'Goodbye' / I don't wanna leave, babe / But you're making it easy."

This marks JVKE's second collaboration with a renowned K-pop artist in a row, as he'd previously worked on "butterflies" with Taehyun of Tomorrow X Together and Chaewon of Le Sserafim. The track may have came out just two weeks ago on July 10, but it has been circulating the Internet as a certified viral hit.

For Lay, this would mark his second major release of the year following his single "开天" (Kai Tan) earlier in January of this year. The artist had made his solo debut in 2016 with the track "Monodrama" released through the SM STATION project, and has since released four full-length albums and four EPs.

== Charts ==
Weekly chart performance for "Easy"
| Chart (2025) | Peak position |
|---|---|
| Billboard China | 50 |
