= Operation Love =

Japanese tv drama

- DVD Cover
- Genre: Comedy, romance
- Directed by: Narita Takeshi (ep1-3,6,8,10-11); Kato Hiromasa (ep4-5,7); Hatsuyama Yasuhiro (ep9)
- Starring: Nagasawa Masami; Tomohisa Yamashita
- Country of origin: Japan
- Original language: Japanese
- No. of episodes: 11 + 1 SP

Production
- Producers: Takiyama Madoka; Misao Reiko

Original release
- Network: Fuji Television
- Release: April 16 – June 24, 2007

Related
- Operation Proposal (South Korea); Operation Love (China)

Operation Love (プロポーズ大作戦, Puropōzu Daisakusen) is a Japanese TV drama series that was aired on Fuji TV. The series started on April 16, 2007 and ended with 11 episodes on June 24, 2007. A special (SP) aired on March 25, 2008.

A Korean remake of the series, Operation Proposal, starring Yoo Seung-ho and Park Eun-bin, aired in 2012. A Chinese remake of the same title, Operation Love starring EXO's Lay and Chen Duling, aired in 2017.

== Plot ==
=== Overview ===
Ken Iwase (岩瀬健) is at his friend, Rei Yoshida's (吉田礼) marriage ceremony. However, he still loves her and regrets not having confessed his feelings towards her. A fairy lets him travel back in time and try one more time to get Rei's heart.

=== Episode synopsis ===
In each episode, Ken travels to each photo that will appear in the slideshow that Mikio made, so that he can correct his regrets in each photo.

| No. | Title |
|---|---|
| 1 | "Can I get married if we had gone to the Koshien!?" |
Ken rushes to Rei's wedding and throughout the ceremony, he suffers regret at never being able to articulate his feelings. A sprite who lives in the church takes pity on him and allows him to "time slip" through certain photos. This gives Ken a second chance to relive key moments in his life. Initially Ken returns to the final game of the season where he has another opportunity to win the game and make the playoffs.
| 2 | "Can I get married through coffee milk!?" |
The photograph on the slide show showing an angry Rei bothered by Ken. He returns to the past where Rei asked him for coffee milk. He thought this coffee milk was his way of changing his present and making him the man who sits beside Rei.
| 3 | "Can I get married if I switch seats?" |
Ken returns to the past wherein they met Tada-sensei, Rei's groom. Ken tried his very best to avoid making Rei and Tada-sensei close. But in the end, it was Tada-sensei who made him see the smile he never saw 6 years ago.
| 4 | "Can I get married by the second button?" |
Ken returns to his high school graduation where boys give their second button to the girl they like. He gave his button to another girl, making Rei disappointed. He gives his best shot in order to touch Rei's heart.
| 5 | "Are those who say they'll do it tomorrow idiots?" |
Ken is given a second chance to let Rei say goodbye to her grandfather.
| 6 | "From what do I graduate on my last day as a teen?" |
Ken returns to just before Rei's birthday and also on her eve of her major architectural project.
| 7 | "When will love and fireworks scatter?" |
Ken returns to a fireworks festival before Tada confesses his feelings to Rei.
| 8 | "Are the tears I shed on New Year's Eve the real thing?" |
Ken returns to their past celebration of new year's eve. He intentionally let his friends go and see the new year's sunrise by themselves, hoping that he would forget all about Rei.
| 9 | "What can I bet at the last moment?" |
Ken returns to just before Tada proposes to Rei.
| 10 | "Last Hallelujah Chance" |
Ken returns to the last photo of the slideshow where they are at Tada's party, where Tada introduces Rei to all his friends. In the middle of the event, Ken drags Rei into their elementary school.
| 11 | "Will a tearful confession call a miracle?" |
Ken plans to have a "coming from behind victory" over Rei, but as he hears Rei's opinion about regrets, Ken decided not to change the past but to act in the present. So Ken returns to just before he has to give a speech at the wedding banquet.

=== SP Synopsis ===
A year later, the characters are in Hawaii for Hisashi's and Eri's wedding ceremony. The fairy appears and allows Ken to travel back in time to save the couple's relationship.

| No. | Title |
|---|---|
| SP | "Should I visit the moment of the vow of eternal love?" |
Ken returns to one week before the wedding ceremony, as he tries to save the couple's relationship, and faces Rei's parents for the first time after the unfinished wedding of Rei and Tada. Ken also finally proposes to Rei.

== Characters ==
=== Main character ===
Ken Iwase (岩瀬 健, Iwase Ken)
The lead protagonist of this drama. Ken's biggest regret is never being able to confess his feelings to his Rei. Rei calls him Ken-Zou as a term of endearment. He was on the baseball team in high school and is currently a salesperson for electronic whiteboards. During Rei's wedding, he is given the chance to relive key moments of his life by entering into different photos in one of the presentations. He is extremely kind-hearted, even helping Tetsuya Tada knowing that in the future, Tada will be his main rival for Rei's affection.

Rei Yoshida (吉田 礼, Yoshida Rei)
Rei has been a childhood friend of Ken's. Their initial meeting is when Ken breaks his eraser in half and shares it with Rei. She has secretly loved Ken as well, but has never been able to articulate her feelings for him. Her seat in high school was always next to Ken's. In university, she studied architecture and won a major architectural award during the course of her studies. At the end of the series, she realizes that she never took the risk of telling Ken her feelings and runs out of her wedding to chase after him.

=== Other characters ===
Eri Oku (奥 エリ, Oku Eri)
Eri has always been the person of Hisashi's affection. She finally decides to go out with him after he stops her from returning to an ex-boyfriend. She is also the best friend of Rei since high school.

Enokido Mikio (榎戸 幹雄, Mikio Enokido)
Mikio begins to figure out that Ken is "slipping through time" and decides to assist him in his quest to change the future. He is also Ken's best friend because he is the only one who knows Ken's feelings towards Rei.

Hisashi Tsurumi (鶴見 尚, Tsurumi Hisashi)
One of Ken's friends. He has always had a crush on Eri even after initial rejections.

Tetsuya Tada (多田 哲也, Tada Tetsuya)
Originally a student teacher at Ken's high school, Tada becomes friends with Ken's group and eventually marries Rei, but after the fairy miracle from which Ken's and Rei's relationship is born, he is seen teaching at a university and is on good terms with his childhood friend.

== Cast ==
- Tomohisa Yamashita as Ken Iwase
  - Kaito Kitamura as Ken Iwase (primary school)
- Masami Nagasawa as Rei Yoshida
  - Tamaki Matsumoto as Rei Yoshida (primary school)
  - Kurumi Hashimoto as Rei Yoshida (childhood)
- Nana Eikura as Eri Oku
- Yūta Hiraoka as Enokido Mikio
- Gaku Hamada as Hisashi Tsurumi
- Naohito Fujiki as Tetsuya Tada
- Hiroshi Mikami as the Yosei/Fairy
- Yutaka Matsushige as Matsunori Itou
- Shigenori Yamazaki as 御法川潤蔵 (The master of ceremonies in the wedding)
- Leo Morimoto as Takashirei Yoshida
- Yoshiko Miyazaki as Reina Yoshida
- Gota Watabe as Socrates
- Fumina Hara as Yuko Matsuki (Mikio's girlfriend)
- Kenichiro Kikuchi as Tamotsu Nishio
- Issa Troare as the marathon runner
- Tomoya Takeuchi as classmate
- Masahiro Okawa as classmate
- Kenta Arai as classmate
- Ayaka Ikezawa as classmate
- Yuko Masumoto as classmate

== Soundtrack ==
- 01 - Rising Road ~Main Theme~
- 02 - Honey Cheese
- 03 - Yume Oi Runner
- 04 - Rainy Man
- 05 - Sasayakana Negai
- 06 - Hallelujah Flash
- 07 - Samayou Kokoro
- 08 - Soremo Mata Seishun
- 09 - Sugar
- 10 - Kibou
- 11 - Gorioshi My Way
- 12 - Sepia no Kyoushitsu
- 13 - Ebi Fry
- 14 - DaDa double chance!
- 15 - Sunao na Kimochi
- 16 - Koi no Daisakusen
- 17 - Ame Agari
- 18 - Ashita Hareru Kana (Piano & Cordes)
- 19 - Kuwata Keisuke - Ashita Hareru Kana
- 20 - Mongol800 - Chiisana Koi No Uta

== Awards ==
53rd Television Drama Academy Awards

- Best Drama
- Best Theme Song by Keisuke Kuwata.
- Special Award

11th Nikkan Sports Drama Grand Prix (Apr-June 7)

- Best Drama
- Best Actor - Yamashita Tomohisa
- Best Actress - Nagasawa Masami
- Best Supporting Actor - Hamada Gaku
- Best Supporting Actress - Eikura Nana
