= Jeong Da-un =

Jeong Da-un is the Revised Romanization of Korean name 정다운, which may refer to:

- Da Woon Jung, South Korean mixed martial artist
- Jung Da-woon, better known as Dvwn, South Korean singer-songwriter
- Joung Da-woon, South Korean judo practitioner
- Jung Da-woon of J Rabbit, South Korean acoustic pop female duo
- Jung Da-woon, Scriptwriter of the Year at the 2019 MBC Entertainment Awards
