= What You Need =

What You Need or What U Need may refer to:

== Albums ==
- What You Need (Side Effect album), 1976
- What You Need (Stacy Lattisaw album), 1989

== Songs ==
- "What You Need" (Tems song), 2025
- "What You Need" (Don Toliver song), 2021
- "What You Need" (INXS song), 1985
- "What You Need" (Powerhouse song), 1999
- "What You Need", by Audio Adrenaline from Audio Adrenaline, 1992
- "What You Need", by Bring Me the Horizon from That's the Spirit, 2015
- "What You Need", by Britney Spears from Glory, 2016
- "What You Need", by the Weeknd from House of Balloons, 2011
- "I Got It (What You Need)", by Galactic from From the Corner to the Block, 2007
- "What U Need", by Lalah Hathaway from Honestly, 2017
- "What U Need?", song by Lay, 2016
- "What U Need", by JoJo, 2020

== Other uses ==
- "What You Need" (The Twilight Zone), a 1959 TV episode
- What You Need, a 1994 novel by Eliza Clark
