= Kim Ye-won (actress, born 1987) =

South Korean actress and singer (born 1987)

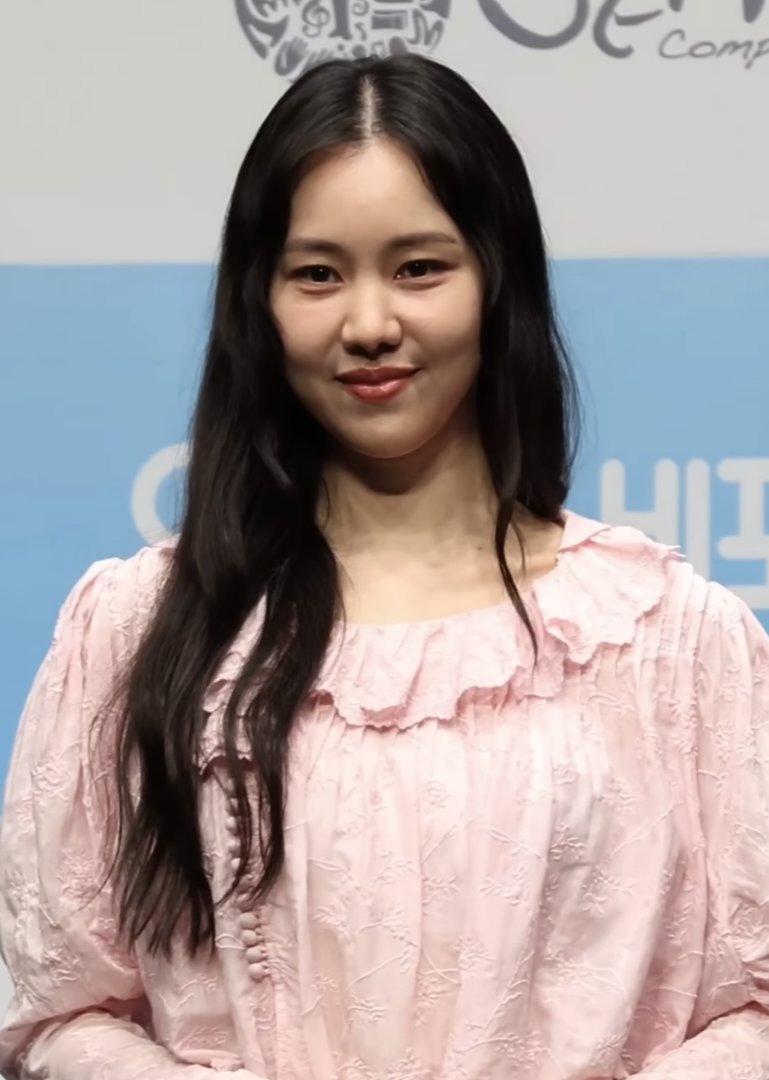
- Kim in June 2026
- Born: Kim Yu-bin; December 11, 1987 (age 38); Seongnam, South Korea
- Education: Chung-Ang University (Theater and Film)
- Occupations: Actress; singer
- Years active: 2008–present
- Agent: Echo Global Group

Korean name
- Hangul: 김유빈
- RR: Gim Yubin
- MR: Kim Yubin

Stage name
- Hangul: 김예원
- Hanja: 金叡園
- RR: Gim Yewon
- MR: Kim Yewŏn

Kim Yu-bin (Korean: 김유빈; born December 11, 1987), better known by the stage name Kim Ye-won (김예원), is a South Korean actress and singer. She is known for acting in Suspicious Partner, Rich Man and Welcome to Waikiki 2.

== Filmography ==
=== Film ===
Year	Title	Role	Notes	Ref.
2008	A Tale of Legendary Libido	Dal-gaeng		
2011	Sunny	Leader of rival gang "Girls' Generation"		
2012	Horror Stories	Nurse	Segment: "Ambulance on the Death Zone"	
2013	Horror Stories 2	Go Byeong-shin's girlfriend	Cameo (Segment: "The Escape")	
2015	Take Off 2	Ga-yeon		
2018	Door Lock	Oh Hyo-joo		
2023	Unlocked	Jeong Eun-joo	Netflix film	
2023	Mount CHIAK	Hyun-ji		

=== Television series ===
Year	Title	Role	Notes	Ref.
2009	Hometown of Legends: "Kiss of the Vampire"	Cho-ah		
2010	Chosun Police 3	Jin Geum-hong	Guest appearance, Episode 1	
2011	Romance Town	Thu Zar Lin		
2011	Cool Guys, Hot Ramen	Kang Dong-joo		
2012	Operation Proposal	Yoo Chae-ri		
2012	I Need Romance 2012	Kang Na-hyun		
2012	The Innocent Man	Kim Yoo-ra		
2012	KBS Drama Special: "Art"	Writer Oh		
2012	KBS Drama Special: "My Wife's First Love"	Natalie		
2013	Pots of Gold	Kwak Min-jung		
2013	Who Are You?	Jang Hee-bin		
2013	Bel Ami	Electric Fairy		
2014	Into the Flames	young Kumiko		
2014	Only Love	Hong Mi-rae		
2016	Don't Dare to Dream	Na Joo-hee		
2017	Tomorrow, with You	Lee Gun-sok		
2017	Suspicious Partner	Na Ji-hae		
2017	Revolutionary Love	Ha Yeon-hee		
2017	Drama Stage: "Assistant Manager Park's Private Life"	Choi Bo-min		
2018	Rich Man	Min Tae-a		
2018	Heart Surgeons	Ahn Ji-na		
2019	Welcome to Waikiki 2	Cha Yoo-ri		
2020–2021	Cheat on Me If You Can	Ahn Se-jin		
2021	You Are My Spring	Park Eun-ha		
2024	Love Your Enemy	Cha Ji-hye		

=== Web series ===
Year	Title	Role	Ref.
2023	Call lt Love	Shim Hye-seong	

=== Web show ===
Year	Title	Role	Notes	Ref.
2021–2024	Transit Love (EXchange)	Panelist	Seasons 1–3	

=== Radio shows ===
Year	Program	Notes	Ref.
2017	Volume Up	DJ	
2022	Volume Up	Special DJ; August 8–14	

=== Music video appearances ===
Year	Title	Artist	Ref.
2009	"Women Are Just Like That"	Kim Dong-hee	

== Musical theatre ==
Musical play performances
Year	Title		Role	Theater	Date	Ref.
Year	English	Korean	Role	Theater	Date	Ref.
2010	Like Rain Like Music	비처럼 음악처럼	Jung-hwa/ Sang-mi			
2013	December	디셈버	Yi-yeon/ Hwa-yi	Sejong Center for the Performing Arts Main Theater	December 16, 2013 – January 29, 2014	
2014	December - Daegu	디셈버 - 대구	Yi-yeon/ Hwa-yi	Daegu Opera House	February 21, 2014 – March 2, 2014	
2014	December - Busan	디셈버 - 부산	Yi-yeon/ Hwa-yi	Sohyang Theatre Shinhan Card Hall	February 7, 2014 – February 16, 2014	
2014	Goong: Musical	궁	Shin Chae-kyeong			
2014	All Shook Up	올슉업	Natalie Haller	Hongik University Daehakro Art Center Main Theater	November 28, 2014 – February 1, 2015	
2016	Jack the Ripper	잭 더 리퍼	Gloria	D-Cube Arts Center	July 15, 2016 – October 9, 2016	
2020	Werther Live	베르테르 라이브	Lotte	Online	December 28, 2020 – January 4, 2021	
2020	Werther	베르테르	Lotte	Gwanglim Art Center BBCH Hall	September 1, 2020 – November 1, 2020	
2023	As ordinary as this	이토록 보통의	J	Yes24 Stage 3	August 29, 2023 – November 12, 2023	

== Discography ==
=== Soundtrack appearances ===
Year	Song title	Notes
2008	"Bird"	The Accidental Gangster and the Mistaken Courtesan OST
2010	"Dahlia of Sadness"	Like Rain Like Music cast recording
2010	"Though You're a Nice Person"	Master of Study OST
2011	"That Coalition"	New Tales of Gisaeng OST
2011	"What a Fool"	Manny OST
2011	"I Swear"	Operation Proposal OST

== Awards and nominations ==
Year	Award	Category	Nominated work	Result	Ref.
2015	9th Daegu International Musical Festival Awards	Musical Actor of the Year	—N/a	Won	
2017	2017 SBS Drama Awards	Best Supporting Actress	Suspicious Partner	Nominated	
