= Winter Special Gift =

2017 extended play by Lay

Winter Gift Special

EP by Lay
- Released: December 22, 2017
- Recorded: 2017
- Studio: Zhang Yixing Studio, China
- Genre: Mandopop; R&B
- Length: 23:52
- Language: Mandarin Chinese
- Label: Tencent; SM
- Producer: Zhang Yixing

Lay chronology
Lay 02 Sheep (2017)	Winter Gift Special (2017)	Namanana (2018)

Singles from Winter Gift Special
- 1. "Goodbye Christmas" Released: December 22, 2017

Winter Special Gift is the special winter album and second extended play by Chinese singer Lay (Zhang Yixing). It was released on December 22, 2017 in China by Tencent on the label's music apps, QQ Music, Kugou and Kuwo. The EP features six tracks in total, including single "Goodbye Christmas".

== Background and release ==
On December 21, it was announced that Lay would release his second EP. Winter Special Gift was officially released on December 22, 2017 through music apps under label Tencent. The album was subsequently released in South Korea the next day on December 23, 2017.

Gift to XBACK was written in 2015, prior to his debut as a solo artist. On December 15, Lay posted a video of himself performing the aforementioned song on Weibo in advance to the release of his album.

== Singles ==
The music video of the lead song for the album, Goodbye Christmas was released together with the album on the same day.

== Commercial performance ==
Within 1 hour of digital sales, the album broke four records on QQ Music: Gold, Double Gold, Triple Gold and Platinum. The album later broke Diamond record on QQ Music.

== Track listing ==
No.	Title	Lyrics	Music	Arrangement	Length
1.	"Goodbye Christmas" (聖誕又至)	Liu Yuan (刘源)	LAY; Onestar	LAY; Kil Eun-kyung	4:40
2.	"Can you feel me" (你的感覺)	Sun Yien	LAY; Onestar; Qi Zhe Xi (祁哲西)	LAY; Qi Zhe Xi (祁哲西)	2:50
3.	"Christmas Love" (聖誕的愛)	Wang YaJun	LAY; Onestar	LAY	3:15
4.	"Gift to XBACK" (小小禮物)	LAY	LAY; Command Freaks	Command Freaks	3:46
5.	"Goodbye Christmas" (English Ver.)	Onestar	LAY; Onestar	LAY; Kil Eun-kyung	4:41
6.	"Goodbye Christmas" (Inst.)		LAY; Onestar	LAY; Kil Eun-kyung	4:40
Total length:					23:52

== Charts ==
=== Weekly charts ===
Chart (2017)	Peak position
Chinese Singles (YinYueTai)	2
Chinese Singles (QQ Music)	3
US World Albums (Billboard)	8

== Sales ==
Region	Sales
China (DL)	848,453

== Release history ==
Region	Date	Format	Label	Producer
China	December 22, 2017	Digital download, streaming audio	Tencent	Zhang Yixing
South Korea	December 23, 2017	Digital download, streaming audio	S.M. Entertainment	Zhang Yixing
Worldwide	December 22, 2017	Digital download, streaming audio	Tencent S.M. Entertainment	Zhang Yixing
