= The Island (2018 Chinese film) =

- Theatrical release poster
- Traditional Chinese: 一出好戲
- Simplified Chinese: 一出好戏
- Literal meaning: A Good Show
- Hanyu Pinyin: yì chū hǎoxì
- Directed by: Huang Bo
- Written by: Huang Bo
- Starring: Huang Bo; Shu Qi; Wang Baoqiang; Lay Zhang; Yu Hewei; Wang Xun
- Production companies: Shanghai Hanna Film Culture Media Co., Ltd.
- Distributed by: Maoyan Movie
- Release date: 10 August 2018 (China)
- Running time: 134 minutes
- Countries: China; Hong Kong
- Language: Mandarin
- Box office: US$198.3 million

The Island (Chinese: 一出好戏) is a 2018 Chinese fantasy comedy film written and directed by Huang Bo in his feature film directorial debut. The film stars Huang, Shu Qi, Wang Baoqiang, Lay Zhang, Yu Hewei, and Wang Xun. The film premiered in China on August 10, 2018.

== Plot ==
Ma Jin is heavily in debt to his coworkers. He struggles to survive at the bottom of society alongside his distant cousin Xiao Xing, a car mechanic. Habitually buying lottery tickets in hopes of striking it rich overnight, Ma Jin dreams of marrying his co-worker Shan Shan.

Meanwhile, scientists around the world warn that a meteor is on a collision course with Earth, with doomsday predictions spreading globally. Amidst this looming crisis, Ma Jin's company sets out on a team-building trip at sea. During the trip, Ma Jin receives news that he has won a sixty million yuan lottery jackpot. Just as he is overwhelmed with joy, a sudden and monstrous wave strikes, shattering everything. When the group regains consciousness, they find themselves stranded on a deserted island, cut off from all contact with the outside world. Believing the wave was caused by the meteor and that the world beyond may no longer exist, the survivors face a new and uncertain reality.

In this extreme environment, Xiao Wang, a zookeeper and company driver, becomes the group's lifeline with his formidable wilderness survival skills. Meanwhile, the company's former leaders, including Lao Zhang, lose their authority and are publicly humiliated by the security staff. As the winning lottery ticket must be redeemed within 90 days or it becomes void, Ma Jin attempts to escape the island with Xiao Xing by boat, but their effort fails, and they are mocked by Xiao Wang and the others.

One day, Lao Zhang and his group discover a half-submerged ship on the island, stocked with supplies and fishing gear. With this newfound advantage, he leads a group away from the rest, promising to help Ma Jin return home. Lao Zhang then establishes a new hierarchy by issuing paper cards as currency, quickly amassing wealth and power. However, Ma Jin soon realizes Lao Zhang has no intention of helping him leave the island. He and Xiao Xing try to escape again, but fail. As the 90-day deadline approaches, their situation grows increasingly desperate.

On the 90th day, a rainstorm suddenly brings a miraculous shower of fish. With food no longer scarce, Ma Jin and Xiao Xing regain leverage. They begin trading for man-made goods like phones and wires. Xiao Xing repairs the electronics and generates power, allowing everyone to see images of their families on the phones, restoring their strength. Through this, Ma Jin and Xiao Xing win over many people.

Over a hundred days pass in relative stability. One day, Ma Jin, Xiao Xing, and Xiao Wang spot a passing ship on the far side of the island. Fearing that returning to civilization would mean going back to poverty and insignificance, Ma Jin and Xiao Xing conceal the discovery and falsely claim that Xiao Wang has lost his mind. However, overcome with guilt, Ma Jin ultimately decides to do the right thing. With the help of Xiao Wang and Shan Shan, he sets fire to the old ship, and the blaze draws the attention of a passing cruise liner, rescuing everyone and ending their time on the island.

== Cast ==
- Huang Bo as Ma Jin
- Shu Qi as Shan Shan
- Wang Baoqiang as Xiao Wang
- Lay Zhang as Xiao Xing
- Yu Hewei as Lao Zhang
- Wang Xun as Lao Pan (Old Pan)
- Li Qinqin as Sister Qi
- Li Youlin as Professor
- Liu Yanqing as Zhao Tianlong
- Zhang Lei as Lao Yu (Old Yu)
- Hao Wenting as Wen Juan
- Yang Kaidi as Lucy
- Xu Zheng as Passenger
- Guan Hu
- Liang Jing as Doctor
- Ning Hao
- Teddy Chan
- Fang Xiaohang
- Wei Jiamei
- Sun Zhongqiu

== Production ==
Huang Bo stated that The Island is partly influenced by the 2009 American film 2012 directed by Roland Emmerich. Huang spent over 3 years to write the screenplay. It is Huang Bo's directorial debut. Huang collaborated on the screenplay with no fewer than six writers: Zhang Ji, Guo Junli, Zha Muchun, Cui Siwei, Xing Aina, and Huang Zhanzhong.

== Soundtrack ==
No.	Title	Lyrics	Music	Singer(s)	Length
1.	"Best Stage (最好的舞台)"	Li Sanmu	Liu Jia	Huang Bo, Wang Baoqiang, Yu Hewei, Wang Xun, Lay Zhang
2.	"Every Star (当每颗星星)" (Theme)	Ashin	Ashin	Ashin, Huang Bo
3.	"Island Love"	Leah Dou	Leah Dou	Leah Dou, Wang Wenying

== Copyright issue ==
On August 12, 2018, Yu Mengyuan (Chinese: 于梦媛) claimed that the screenplay of The Island bear similarities to her work Men's Crisis (Chinese: 男人危机).

== Release ==
The Island premiered in China on August 10, 2018. It grossed 150 million yuan on its first day. The film grossed total of 1,350,000,000 yuan.

== Reception ==
The film was a commercial and critical success, receiving a rating of 7.3 out of 10 from Douban.

== Awards and nominations ==
Year	Award	Category	Recipient	Result	Ref.
2019	25th Huading Awards	Best Supporting Actor	Lay Zhang	Won	
