= Namanana =

- Digital cover

Studio album by Lay
- Released: October 19, 2018
- Recorded: 2018
- Studios: Doobdoob (Seoul); In Grid (Seoul); SM Big Shot (Seoul); SM LVYIN (Seoul); Zhang Yixing Studio (Beijing)
- Genres: Pop; dancehall; hip hop
- Length: 69:48
- Languages: English; Mandarin Chinese
- Labels: SM; Zhang Yixing; Iriver
- Producer: Lay

Lay chronology
Winter Special Gift (2017)	Namanana (2018)	Honey (2019)

Singles from Namanana
- 1. "Give Me a Chance" Released: October 5, 2018; 2. "Namanana" Released: October 19, 2018

Namanana (stylized in all caps) is the second studio album by Chinese singer Lay. It was released on October 19, 2018 by SM Entertainment. The album features 22 tracks in total, 11 of which are in Chinese language with English counterparts for each, including the two singles "Give Me a Chance" and "Namanana". The album marks the singer's US debut under the name Lay Zhang.

== Background and release ==
On September 21, Lay announced his US debut with a full-length album, set to be released on October 19. The artist participated in producing each track of the album. On September 28, it was announced that Lay would pre-release his song "Give Me a Chance" on October 5, which was co-written and co-composed by Bazzi, and that he would also release the music video of the song on his birthday, October 7.

On October 5, the track "Give Me a Chance" was released along with a teaser of the music video. On October 7, the music video of "Give Me a Chance" was released. On October 16, the album teaser was released and the digital pre-sale in China started. On October 18, Namanana music video teaser was released. On October 19, the album and the music video of the title track "Namanana" were officially released.

== Promotion ==
Lay performed the title track "Namanana" on Tencent's Yo! Bang music show on October 21. The singer performed "Give Me a Chance" and on episode 8 of the Chinese program Idol Hits, aired on October 26, as well as episode 9, aired on November 2.

Lay began promoting Namanana in the United States on November 2, where he was interviewed by BUILD Series NYC. On November 5, Lay appeared on WNYW's Good Day New York, where he talked about his album and performed "Namanana". On the same day, the singer had an interview on the People Now program. Lay held a free fan event in New York City on November 6, 2018, at the PlayStation Theater.

== Singles ==
"Give Me a Chance" was released on October 5.

== Commercial performance ==
Within 11 minutes and 11 seconds of the album's pre-sale in China on October 16, Namanana broke eight records and reached Double Diamond on QQ Music. It became the fastest digital album to break all the certifications in such a short time. The album broke the ninth record on QQ Music and reached the Hall of Fame Gold Diamond status in 11 hours and 57 minutes.

Namanana became QQ Music's best selling album of 2018 and the fastest to receive all 9 QQ Music sales certifications. As of December 11, Namanana became the best selling album of all time on QQ Music, with 23.4 million renminbi (RMB) in sales.

== Track listing ==
The track list is taken from QQ Music

CD1 (Chinese version)
No.	Title	Lyrics	Music	Arrangement	Length
1.	"集结号" (The Assembly Call)	(instrumental)	Lay	Lay	1:25
2.	"梦不落雨林" (Namanana)	Pan Yan Ting (Golden Hook Music)	Lay; PinkSlip; Anthony Pavel; MZMC	Lay	3:28
3.	"爱到这" (Give Me a Chance)	Wang Jing Yun	Lay; Andrew Bazzi; Mike Woods; Kevin White; MZMC	Lay	3:43
4.	"催眠术" (Lay U Down)	Pan Yan Ting (Golden Hook Music)	Lay; Jakob Mihoubi; Rudi Daouk; Qi Zhe Xi	Lay; Qi Zhe Xi	3:06
5.	"爱的引力" (Save You)	Pan Yan Ting (Golden Hook Music); Lay	Lay; Jakob Mihoubi; Rudi Daouk	Lay	3:31
6.	"坚持" (Hold On)	Sun Yi En	Lay; Jeff Lewis	Lay	3:11
7.	"幸福上瘾" (Thing for You)	Pan Yan Ting (Golden Hook Music)	Lay; VEDO	Lay	2:52
8.	"麻婆豆腐" (Mapo Tofu)	Pan Yan Ting (Golden Hook Music)	Lay; Dawn	Lay	2:42
9.	"香水" (Flavour)	Pan Yan Ting (Golden Hook Music)	Lay; Jakob Mihoubi; Rudi Daouk	Lay	4:10
10.	"快门回溯" (Don't Let Me Go)	Pan Yan Ting (Golden Hook Music)	Lay; Qi Zhe Xi; Michaela Shiloh; MZMC; VMP; Kyle Christopher	Lay; Qi Zhe Xi	3:31
11.	"贝壳女孩" (Tattoo)	Zhou Wei Jie	Lay; Hyuk Shin; JJ Evans (Joombas); Ashley Alisha (Joombas)	Lay	3:15
Total length:					34:54

CD2 (English version)
No.	Title	Lyrics	Music	Arrangement	Length
1.	"The Assembly Call"	(instrumental)	Lay	Lay	1:25
2.	"Namanana"	Anthony Pavel; PinkSlip	Lay; PinkSlip; Anthony Pavel; MZMC	Lay	3:28
3.	"Give Me a Chance"	Andrew Bazzi; Kevin White; Mike Woods	Lay; Andrew Bazzi; Mike Woods; Kevin White; MZMC	Lay	3:43
4.	"Lay U Down"	Jakob Mihoubi; Rudi Daouk	Lay; Jakob Mihoubi; Rudi Daouk; Qi Zhe Xi	Lay; Qi Zhe Xi	3:06
5.	"Save You"	Jakob Mihoubi; Rudi Daouk	Lay; Jakob Mihoubi; Rudi Daouk	Lay	3:31
6.	"Hold On"	Jeff Lewis	Lay; Jeff Lewis	Lay	3:11
7.	"Thing for You"	VEDO	Lay; VEDO	Lay	2:52
8.	"Mapo Tofu"	Anthony Pavel; MZMC	Lay; Dawn	Lay	2:42
9.	"Flavour"	Jakob Mihoubi; Rudi Daouk	Lay; Jakob Mihoubi; Rudi Daouk	Lay	4:10
10.	"Don't Let Me Go"	Anthony Pavel; MZMC	Lay; Qi Zhe Xi; Michaela Shiloh; MZMC; VMP; Kyle Christopher	Lay; Qi Zhe Xi	3:31
11.	"Tattoo"	JJ Evans (Joombas); Ashley Alisha (Joombas)	Lay; Hyuk Shin; JJ Evans (Joombas); Ashley Alisha (Joombas)	Lay	3:15
Total length:					34:54

== Charts ==
=== Weekly charts ===
Chart (2018)	Peak position
French Digital Albums (SNEP)	161
US Billboard 200	21
US Independent Albums (Billboard)	1
US World Albums (Billboard)	1

=== Year-end charts ===
Chart (2018)	Position
US Independent Albums (Billboard)	34
US World Albums (Billboard)	4

== Sales ==
Region	Sales
China (DL)	1,102,391
United States	24,000

== Accolades ==
Awards and nominations
Year	Award	Category	Work	Result
2019	26th ERC Chinese Top Ten Awards	Top Ten Gold Songs	"Namanana"	Won
2019	Pop Music Gold Chart Annual Festival	Best Music Arrangement of the Year	"Namanana"	Won
2019	iQIYI Scream Night Awards	Producer of the Year	"Namanana"	Won
2019	Tencent Music Entertainment Awards	Best Selling Digital Album of the Year	"Namanana"	Won

Music program awards
Song	Program	Date
"Give Me a Chance"	Yo! Bang (Tencent QQ)	October 14, 2018
"Give Me a Chance"	Yo! Bang (Tencent QQ)	October 21, 2018
"Namanana"	Yo! Bang (Tencent QQ)	November 15, 2018

== Release history ==
Region	Date	Format	Label
United States	October 19, 2018	CD, digital download, streaming	SM; Zhang Yixing Studio; IRIVER
China	October 19, 2018	CD, digital download, streaming	SM; Zhang Yixing Studio; IRIVER
South Korea	October 19, 2018	CD, digital download, streaming	SM; Zhang Yixing Studio; IRIVER
Various	October 19, 2018	Digital download, streaming	SM; Zhang Yixing Studio
