= Operation Proposal =

- Genre: Romance; Fantasy
- Written by: Yoon Ji-ryun
- Directed by: Kim Woo-sun
- Starring: Yoo Seung-ho; Park Eun-bin
- Country of origin: South Korea
- Original language: Korean
- No. of episodes: 16

Production
- Production location: South Korea
- Running time: Wednesdays and Thursdays at 20:45 (KST)

Original release
- Network: TV Chosun
- Release: 8 February – 29 March 2012

Related
- Operation Love (Japan); Operation Love (China)

Operation Proposal (Korean: 프로포즈 대작전; RR: Peuropojeu daejakjeon) is a 2012 South Korean television series starring Yoo Seung-ho and Park Eun-bin. It aired on TV Chosun from February 8 to March 29, 2012 on Wednesdays and Thursdays at 20:45 for 16 episodes. It is a remake of Japanese drama Operation Love (プロポーズ大作戦, Proposal Daisakusen) that aired on Fuji TV in 2007.

Yoo and Park had previously starred together as child actors in the 2007 fantasy/historical epic The Legend.

== Synopsis ==
Kang Baek-ho and Ham Yi-seul have been best friends since elementary school. Baek-ho has never acknowledged his attraction to her, unaware that Yi-seul has been in love with him for more than 20 years. Finally, at the wedding ceremony where Yi-seul is about to marry another man (Jin-won), Baek-ho regrets that he never confessed his love for the bride. A mysterious conductor suddenly appears and offers him a second chance to win Yi-seul's heart. Baek-ho travels back in time to various events of their lives hoping to change the outcome of their relationship. But changing the future is not as easy as it seems.

== Cast ==
- Yoo Seung-ho as Kang Baek-ho

His father died when he was a child, and he grew up in Yi-seul's family because his mother was never home due to her job. In high school, he was a pitcher on the baseball team, from which he retired after an injury.

- Park Eun-bin as Ham Yi-seul

Baek-ho's childhood friend. She is a selfless girl who puts others first, and has a very motherly attitude towards Baek-ho. In high school, she was the class president, a member of the drama club and the manager of the baseball team. Her dream was to be a sports agent, but she eventually became the PR of a baseball team.

- Go Kyung-pyo as Song Chan-wook

Baek-ho's best friend, he is calm, rational and loyal. In high school, he was a pitcher on the baseball team along with Baek-ho and Tae-nam, but he left to pursue his true passion, cinema. He dreamed of becoming a film director, but he eventually found work as a cameraman.

- Park Young-seo as Joo Tae-nam

Baek-ho's friend. He has a huge crush on Chae-ri from the sixth grade and is very jealous of any man who comes close to her, even if she doesn't reciprocate his feelings and often teases him for his short stature. Thanks to his interrelational ability and business acumen, he later becomes Chae-ri's manager.

- Kim Ye-won as Yoo Chae-ri

Yi-seul's best friend. A vain girl very popular among males since high school, and often changes boyfriend. She dreamed of breaking into show business, but eventually became a cheerleader.

- Lee Hyun-jin as Kwon Jin-won

A former baseball hitter, he was discovered on the first year of university by Major League, but had to give up the sport career due to an injury. He has studied at Harvard, where he earned a master's degree in business administration. He later returned to Korea and was chosen as a baseball coach by his former school, Haneul High School. He fell in love with Yi-seul, and later becomes her fiancé. He is a well-educated man from a prestigious family, and the founder of Sport K.

- Lee Doo-il as Jo Kook-dae

The owner of the tavern where Baek-ho and friends spend their free time. He is a jovial and cultured man who speaks in half-English.

- Park Jin-joo as Jo Jin-joo

Kook-dae's niece, who lives with him and works as a waitress in his tavern. She is the only survivor of a fatal accident that killed both her parents and since then, she hasn't spoken. Because of her closed and creepy attitude, she is avoided by everyone. The only person among Baek-ho's friends to pay her attention than usual is Chan-wook; therefore, she has a crush on him, and understands what he wants even before he has finished speaking. She is good at singing and playing the guitar.

- Kim Tae-hoon as Kang Jin-woo

The time conductor. He is Baek-ho's father, a stationmaster who died to save a child who was about to be hit by a train.

- Joo Jin-mo as Ham Sung-hoon

Yi-seul's father. He produces baseball gloves.

- Lee Eung-kyung as Oh Jung-rim

Yi-seul's mother. A loving woman who gives many tips to Baek-ho and considers him a son.

- Go In-beom as Oh Tae-beom

Yi-seul's maternal grandfather. A bossy and stubborn man used to get what he wants. He was a great baseball coach feared for his severity. He loves Yi-seul more than his own daughter, and sees Baek-ho as the son and grandson he has never had, teaching him all the secrets of baseball. He died while Yi-seul was attending her first year of college.

- Lee Seung-ho as Min-ho
- Lee Dal-hyung as teacher
- Kim Seung-pil as event MC
- Moon Chun-shik as Yoo Byul-nam

== Original soundtrack ==
Operation Proposal: Original Sound Track

Soundtrack album by Various Artists
- Genres: Pop, K-pop, soundtrack
- Labels: Hoga Entertainment; Neowiz Internet

Part 1:
No.	Title	Artist	Length
1.	"If You Love Me"	J Rabbit	3:25
2.	"If You Love Me - Instrumental"	J Rabbit	3:25

Part 2:
No.	Title	Artist	Length
1.	"Greeting (인사)"	J Rabbit	4:19
2.	"Greeting (인사) (Inst.)"	J Rabbit	4:19

Part 3:
No.	Title	Artist	Length
1.	"That's Why I Didn't Know (그래서 몰랐다)"	Lee Dong-ha	4:50
2.	"That's Why I Didn't Know (그래서 몰랐다) (MR)"	Lee Dong-ha	4:50

Part 4:
No.	Title	Artist	Length
1.	"Be My Heart"	Lee Ji-hoon	4:10
2.	"Be My Heart (MR)"	Lee Ji-hoon	4:10

Part 5:
No.	Title	Artist	Length
1.	"Oh! My Goddess (오! 나의 여신님)"	T.A.COPY.	3:12
2.	"Oh! My Goddess (오! 나의 여신님) (MR)"	T.A.COPY.	3:12

Part 6:
No.	Title	Artist	Length
1.	"A Little Love Story (작은 사랑이야기)"	Park Eun-bin	3:50
2.	"A Little Love Story (작은 사랑이야기) (MR)"	Park Eun-bin	3:50

Part 7:
No.	Title	Artist	Length
1.	"Since That Day (그날 이후)"	Park Jin-joo	3:50
2.	"I Swear"	Kim Shin-ah	3:57
3.	"Be My Heart"	Lee Ji-hoon	4:26
4.	"Since That Day (그날 이후) (MR)"	Park Jin-joo	3:50
5.	"I Swear (MR)"	Kim Shin-ah	3:57
6.	"Be My Heart (MR)"	Lee Ji-hoon	4:26

OST
No.	Title	Artist	Length
1.	"Greeting (인사)"	J Rabbit	4:20
2.	"Oh! My Goddess (오! 나의 여신님)"	T.A.COPY.	4:20
3.	"Be My Heart"	Lee Ji-hoon	4:12
4.	"That's Why I Didn't Know (그래서 몰랐다)"	Lee Dong-ha	4:52
5.	"If You Love Me"	J Rabbit	3:27
6.	"A Little Love Story (작은 사랑이야기)"	Park Eun-bin	3:52
7.	"Since That Day (그날 이후)"	Park Jin-joo	3:52
8.	"I Swear"	Kim Shin-ah	3:59
9.	"Lighten Up (웃어봐)"	D.I.A	2:26
