= Lose Control (EP) =

- Digital cover

EP by Lay
- Released: October 28, 2016
- Recorded: 2016
- Studios: Doobdoob (Seoul); In Grid (Seoul); Zhang Yixing Studio, China
- Genres: Mandopop; R&B
- Length: 24:05
- Language: Mandarin Chinese
- Labels: SM
- Producer: Zhang Yixing

Lay chronology
Lose Control (2016)	Lay 02 Sheep (2017)

Singles from Lose Control
- 1. "what U need?" Released: October 7, 2016; 2. "Lose Control" Released: October 28, 2016

Lose Control is the debut extended play by Chinese singer Lay (Zhang Yixing). It was released on October 28, 2016 in South Korea and China by SM Entertainment and distributed by KT Music. The EP features six tracks in total, including the two singles "what U need?" and "Lose Control".

The EP was a commercial success, peaking at number one on the Gaon Album Chart. It was the seventh best-selling album of 2016 in South Korea according to Gaon, and was the number one performing album of the year on the YinYueTai chart in China.

== Background and release ==
On September 21, 2016 it was announced that Lay would release his first solo album in October. "what U need?" was released on October 7 as Lay's birthday gift for his fans. On October 21 it was revealed that Lay would release his first mini-album Lose Control on October 28 in South Korea and China and that the album consists of 6 Chinese tracks. The single "what U need?" was included in this mini-album. Lay was a producer, and personally in charge of the composition, arrangement and writing the lyrics of all the songs. On October 25, 2016, S.M. Entertainment released a teaser for the music video of "Lose Control". Lose Control was officially released on October 28 through online and regular stores.

== Singles ==
The song "Lose Control" stayed as #1 on Billboard's China V Chart for 6 weeks in a row. It also topped "Alibaba Top 100 Weekly Songs" for 14 weeks in a row and ranked #1 on YinYueTai's TOP 100 Songs of 2016. "what U need?" hit the #4 spot on the China V Chart as well as in Billboard's World Digital Songs. The song reached number one on the Alibaba real time music chart in China.

== Promotion ==
On October 27, Lay held a press conference for the mini-album at Shanghai Town & Country Community in China. Lay performed "what U need?" for the first time on October 9 at the 2016 Asia Song Festival in Busan, South Korea. On November 15, Lay made his debut performance on the music program The Show.

== Commercial performance ==
The physical album sales exceeded 50,000 copies a day after its release. On the first weekend have exceeded 97,000, and had sold more than 125,000 in 7 days. Over 1,000,000 copies of the digital album have been sold on Xiami. The album ranked at #1 for consecutively 6 weeks on the YinYueTai China Weekly Song Charts. The album sold 260,000 physical copies in 2016.

== Track listing ==
No.	Title	Lyrics	Music	Arrangement	Length
1.	"Lose Control (失控)"	Lay, CC	Devine Channel, Lay	Devine Channel, Lay	3:31
2.	"what U need? (你要什么)"	Lay, CC	Devine-Channel, Lay	Devine-Channel, Lay	4:00
3.	"Tonight"	Wang Ya Jun, Lay, CC	Devine-Channel, Lay	Devine-Channel, Lay	3:33
4.	"MYM"	Lay	Command Freaks, Lay	Command Freaks, Lay, Maeng Yonze	4:03
5.	"MYM" (acoustic version)	Lay	Lay	Lay, Maeng Yonze	4:47
6.	"Relax (守望)"	Lay	Devine-Channel, Lay	Devine-Channel, Lay	4:21
Total length:					24:05

== Charts ==
=== Weekly charts ===
Chart (2016)	Peak position
South Korean Album (Gaon)	1
Japanese Albums (Oricon)	34
US Heatseekers Albums (Billboard)	23
US World Albums (Billboard)	4

=== Monthly charts ===
Chart (2016)	Peak position
South Korean Albums (Gaon)	1

=== Year-end charts ===
Chart (2016)	Position
Chinese Albums (YinYueTai)	1
South Korean Albums (Gaon)	7

== Awards ==
Year	Award	Category	Result
2017	5th YinYueTai V Chart Awards	Album of the Year	Won

== Sales ==
Region	Sales amount
China (digital)	1,169,584
Japan	2,689
South Korea	277,439

== Release history ==
Region	Date	Format	Label	Producer
South Korea	October 28, 2016	CD, digital download	SM Entertainment	Zhang Yixing
China	October 28, 2016	Digital download	SM Entertainment	Zhang Yixing
Various	October 28, 2016	Digital download	SM Entertainment	Zhang Yixing
