= J Rabbit =

South Korean musical duo

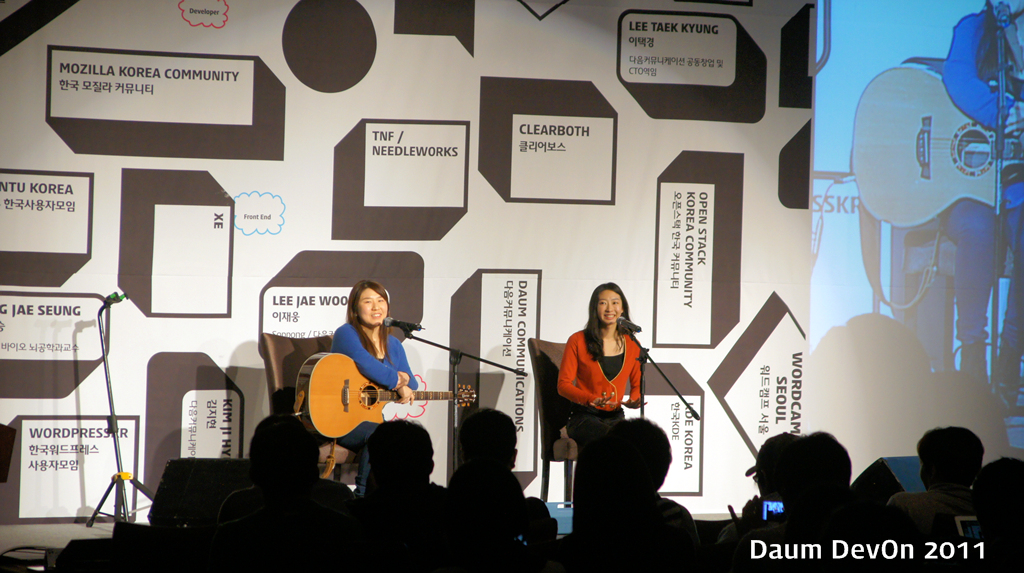
- Jung Da-woon (left) and Jung Hye-sun (right) in 2011

Background information
- Also known as: 제이레빗
- Origin: South Korea
- Genres: Acoustic pop
- Years active: 2010–present
- Labels: friendz.net
- Members: Jung Hye-sun; Jung Da-woon

J Rabbit (제이레빗) is a South Korean acoustic pop female duo under the label friendz.net. They debuted on November 27, 2010 with the single "Take One". The group's name is derived from combining the letter ‘J’ from their matching surname ‘Jung’ and the year of the rabbit, 1987, which they were both born in.

== Members ==
=== Jung Hye-sun (정혜선) ===
- Birthdate: September 23, 1987 (age 38)
- Lead vocals
- Graduate of Seoul Institute of the Arts

=== Jung Da-woon (정다운) ===
- Birthdate: June 10, 1987 (age 38)
- Instruments, songwriter
- Graduate of Seoul Institute of the Arts

== Artistry ==
J Rabbit has a unique style focusing on creating music for everyone no matter their age and aiming to console people with their music. Their songs are light hearted, relaxing, and up-beat while using unique instruments like bells, xylophones, violins, cellos, and melodeon accordions. An editor working with Seoulbeats, Leslie Tumbaco mentions "They have such a keen understanding of the basics of music, which makes their stripped-down melodies so magnetic". Along with the light hearted songs their performances are very light hearted and fun as well, drawing in audiences and attention with their personalities.

== Discography ==
=== Albums ===
Title	Album details	Peak chart positions
Title	Album details	KOR
It's Spring	Released: March 4, 2011 (KOR); Formats: CD, digital download	46
Looking Around	Released: April 25, 2012; Formats: CD, digital download	47
Merry Christmas From J Rabbit (Christmas Cover Album)	Released: November 30, 2012; Formats: digital download	-
Stop & Go	Released: June 19, 2014; Formats: CD, digital download	38
Growing Everyday	Released: May 3, 2016; Formats: CD, digital download	-
The Little Heroes	Released: November 30, 2018; Formats: CD, digital download	-
Dialogue on the Road	Released: May 10, 2019; Formats: CD, digital download	70

=== Singles ===
Title	Year	Peak chart positions	Album
Title	Year	KOR	Album
"Take One"	2010	—	It's Spring
"Christmas Live"	2010	—	Non-album single
"Hcube wiv J Rabbit – aMorejo"	2011	—	Non-album single
"Hcube wiv J Rabbit – R U tired?" (힘든가요?)	2011	—	Non-album single
"Where the Wind Blows From" (바람이 불어오는 곳)	2011	53	Kwang Seok, KIM Best album (명불허전` 김광석 다시듣기)
"Happy Things"	2012	96	Looking Around
"The Moon Embraces The Rabbit Volume 1" (달을 품은 토끼 Vol. 1)	2013	—	Non-album single
"The Moon Embraces The Rabbit Volume 2" (달을 품은 토끼 Vol. 2)	2013	84	Non-album single
"Good Feeling" (기분 좋은 느낌)	2014	—	Non-album single
"Growing Everyday"	2016	—	Growing Everyday
"Beautiful Life"	2016	—	Beautiful Life

=== Soundtracks ===
Title	Year	Album
"If You Love Me"	2012	Operation Proposal OST Part.1
"Greeting" (인사)	2012	Operation Proposal OST Part.2
"Talkin' Bout Love"	2013	My Cute Guys OST Part.2
"Snooze (I Will Be Your Love)" (선잠 (나 그대의 사랑이 되리))	2013	Monstar OST Part 4
"Is It Love" (사랑일까)	2014	Discovery of Love OST Part.2
"Don't Know Why"	2015	Righteous Love OST Part.4
"Wonderful World"	2015	Hyde Jekyll, Me OST Part.4
"Mon Tue Wed Thu Fri Sat Sun" (월화수목금토일)	2016	Don't Dare to Dream OST Part.9
"Oh? Truly!" (Oh? 진심!)	2019	Touch Your Heart OST Part.2
"I Want You Every Day"	2019	Cookie Run: Ovenbreak OST
"Go For It!"	2019	Cookie Run: Ovenbreak OST
"You Always" (넌 언제나)	2020	Hospital Playlist OST Part.7
"Just You" (너로 가득해)	2020	Record of Youth OST Part.8

=== Collaborations ===
Title	Year	Other artist(s)
"Somewhere The Wind Is Blowing" (바람이 불어오는 곳)	2011	Kim Kwang-seok
"Merry Christmas from friendz.net" Track listing: 1. Winter Wonderland; 2. White Christmas & Rockin' Around the Christmas Tree; 3. Sleigh Ride; 4. Don't Save It All For Christmas Day; 5. Oh Holy Night; 6. September	2011	friendz.net
"The hope in my life" (특별한 바램)	2012	SAVe tHE AiR Green Concert Vol.2
"You Are My Friend (Original Single Mix)"	2012	Cream Puff
"Ajeossi" (아저씨)	2012	Kim Jin-pyo
"Patbingsu" (팥빙수)	2013	Yoon Jong-shin
"Baby Shark" (상어 가족)	2017	Pinkfong
"Merry Twistmas" (크리스마스 콜라보)	2017	Pinkfong
"To Love Only Once" (사랑을 한 번 할 수 있다면)	2019	Park Kyung

== Filmography ==
Year	Title	Notes
2014	NANJANG	Hosted from February 8, 2014 to June 28, 2014
2018	Kim Je-dong's Talk to You Season 2	Co-host

== Awards and nominations ==
=== Mnet 20's Choice Awards ===
Year	Nominee / work	Award	Result
2013	J Rabbit	20's Hot Band	Nominated
