= Operation Love (Chinese TV series) =

Chinese Television Series

- Official Promotional Poster
- Genre: Romantic-comedy
- Written by: Jin Zi Mao Shu; Fang Kun
- Directed by: Mao Xiaorui
- Starring: Lay Zhang; Chen Duling
- Country of origin: China
- Original language: Chinese
- No. of episodes: 32

Production
- Production locations: Shanghai, China
- Running time: 45 mins
- Production companies: Shanghai Media Group, Tencent Pictures

Original release
- Network: Dragon TV
- Release: April 24 – June 6, 2017

Related
- Operation Love (Japan); Operation Proposal (South Korea)

Operation Love (Chinese: 求婚大作战) is a 2017 Chinese television series starring Lay Zhang and Chen Duling. The series is a remake of the Japanese drama of the same name that aired in 2007. It aired on Dragon TV from 24 April to 6 June 2017 and was also streamed on QQLive.

== Synopsis ==
Yan Xiaolai and Ji Tiantian have been best friends for more than ten years. Naive and oblivious when it comes to love, Xiaolai does not realize his feelings for Tiantian; despite the latter trying multiple times to confess her feelings for him. Tiantian eventually gives up and accepts her teacher. At the wedding ceremony when Tiantian is about to marry another man, Xiaolai regrets that he never confessed his feelings for her. An angel appears and offers him a second chance to change the past. Xiaolai travels back to various events of their life, hoping to change the outcome of their relationship.

== Cast ==
=== Main ===
- Lay Zhang as Yan Xiao Lai
- Chen Duling as Ji Tian Tian
- Julian Cheung as Angel
- Toby Lee as Xiao Wei Zhe
- Zhao Yuanyuan as You Li
- Lv Zhazha as Gao Duan
- Zhang Haowei as Chen Hao Nan

=== Supporting ===
- Wang Bozhao as old Yan Xiaolai
- Wang Ruijia as old Ji Tiantian
- Gao Baobao as old You Li
- Chunyu Shanshan as old Xiao Duan
- Xu Wei as old Chen Haonan
- Yang Xue'er as Li Ziyao
- Chen Shangze as Luo Hu
- Ji Xuefei as Ji Tiantian's mother
- Wang Jiancheng as Ji Tiantian's father
- Liang Xuefei as makeup artist
- Cao Lianfang as Luo Hu's mother
- Yang Jinci as Da Xiong
- Li Yuehui as Wang Zhuren

=== Special appearance ===
- Coco Lee as herself (Ep. 8)

== Original soundtrack ==
=== OST Part 1 ===
No.	Title	Lyrics	Music	Artist	Length
1.	"Pray" (祈愿)	Lay Zhang	Lay Zhang	Lay Zhang	03:54
2.	"Pray" (Piano Ver.)		Lay Zhang	Zhang Yixing	03:54
3.	"Pray" (Piano String Ver.)		Zhang Yixing	Zhang Yixing	03:54
Total length:					11:42

== Reception ==
=== Ratings ===
China Dragon TV premiere ratings (CSM52)
Episode	Broadcast date	Ratings (%)	Audience share (%)	Rankings
1-2	2017.4.24	0.513	3.107	8
3-4	2017.5.1	0.385	2.229	15
5-6	2017.5.8	0.356	2.134	15
7-8	2017.5.15	0.347	2.721	15
9-12	2017.5.22	0.577	4.858	11
13-16	2017.5.23	0.606	4.332	10
17-20	2017.5.29	0.636	4.376	8
21-24	2017.5.30	0.617	4.704	11
25-28	2017.6.5	0.546	4.315	10
29-32	2017.6.6	0.556	4.504	11

== See also ==
- Operation Love (2007, Japan)
- Operation Proposal (2012, South Korea)
