= Lose Control (Lay song) =

Single by Lay

from the album Lose Control
- Released: October 28, 2016
- Recorded: 2016
- Studio: Zhang Yixing Studio
- Genre: C-pop; R&B
- Length: 3:31
- Label: S.M. Entertainment
- Songwriters: Lay, CC
- Producers: Devine Channel, Lay

Lay singles chronology
"what U need?" (2016)	"Lose Control" (2016)	"I Need U" (2017)

Music video
- "Lose Control" on YouTube

"Lose Control" is a single recorded by Chinese singer Lay for his debut extended play Lose Control. The song was released on October 28, 2016 by S.M. Entertainment.

== Background and release ==
Produced by Devine Channel and Lay, "Lose Control" is described as a "Pop-R&B" song that has a distinct guitar melody. The lyrics tells a story about a guy giving everything to a girl and as a result he loses his self-control. The song was released officially along with EP on October 28, 2016.

== Live performance ==
Lay performed "Lose Control" for the first time on the South Korean music program The Show on November 15, 2016. He also performed "Lose Control" along with "what U Need" at the SMG New Year's Eve Gala 2017 in Baoshan Sports Centre, Shanghai on December 31, 2016.

== Reception ==
"Lose Control" stayed at #1 on Billboard's China V Chart for 6 weeks in a row. The song topped "Alibaba Top 100 Weekly Songs" for 14 weeks in a row and was ranked #1 on YinYueTai's "TOP 100 Songs of 2016".

== Charts ==
Chart (2016)	Peak position
Chinese Singles (Billboard)	1
South Korean singles (Gaon)	— (Note: "Lose Control" charted at number 52 on the Gaon International Digital Chart.)
US World Digital Songs (Billboard)	18

== Sales ==
Region	Sales
South Korea (Gaon)	6,691
