= Monodrama (song) =

Single by Lay

from the album SM Station Season 1
- Language: Mandarin
- Released: May 27, 2016
- Recorded: 2016
- Studio: Zhang Yixing (Beijing)
- Genre: C-pop; R&B
- Length: 4:05
- Label: SM
- Composers: Lay; Devine Channel
- Lyricists: Lay; CC
- Producers: Lay; Devine Channel

Lay singles chronology
"Monodrama" (2016)	"what U need?" (2016)

Music video
- "Monodrama" on YouTube

"Monodrama" (Chinese: 独角戏; Korean: 모노드라마) is a single recorded by Chinese singer Lay. It was released on May 27, 2016, by SM Entertainment through SM Station.

== Background and release ==
Produced by Lay and Devine Channel, Monodrama is described as "R&B" song with a detailed acoustic guitar and soft piano melody with lyrics that express the emotions of a man feeling the pain of an unrequited love. "Monodrama" is SM STATION's first Chinese language song. It was released officially on May 27, 2016.

== Music video ==
The music video of "Monodrama" was officially released on May 27, 2016.

== Live performance ==
Lay performed "Monodrama" live on Exo Planet 3 – The Exo'rdium concerts. Lay subsequently performed the song at Star Show 360, a variety show on MBC Every 1.

== Track listing ==
No.	Title	Lyrics	Music	Arrangement	Length
1.	"Monodrama" (独角戏)	Lay, CC	Lay, Devine Channel	Lay, Devine Channel	04:05
2.	"Monodrama" (Inst.)		Lay, Devine Channel	Lay, Devine Channel	04:05
Total length:					08:10

== Reception ==
Upon release, "Monodrama" music video was ranked #1 on VCharts China, iTunes Singapore, Hong Kong, Taiwan, Thailand, Malaysia, Vietnam and Japan. It ranked #2 in the Philippines and USA and #3 in Indonesia. "Monodrama" ranked #1 on Billboard's China V Chart for consecutively five weeks. The music video has broken the record on Charts in just two days, where it gained 1,968,909 views in 48 hours. The song ranked #4 on YinYueTai's TOP 100 Songs of 2016 (China) V Chart. "Monodrama" also ranked #2 on Alibaba Year-End Top 40 Music Chart for 2016. It ranked No.7 on Xiami's Top 100 Most Popular Singles of 2016 in China.

== Charts ==
Chart (2016)	Peak position
China V Chart (Billboard)	1
South Korea (Gaon)	155
US World Digital Songs (Billboard)	5

== Release history ==
Region	Date	Format	Label
Various	May 27, 2016	Digital download; streaming	SM
