= QQ Music =

Chinese music streaming service operated by Tencent Music

- Developer: Tencent Music
- Operating system: Windows, Android, macOS, iOS, iPadOS
- Available in: Chinese Simplified
- Type: Music streaming
- License: Proprietary software
- Website: y.qq.com

QQ Music (Chinese: QQ音乐) is one of three Chinese freemium music streaming services owned by Tencent Music. As of 2018, the service is set to reach over 700 million users with an estimated 120 million subscribers.

The service merged with China Music Corporation, the owner of KuGou and KuWo, the second and the third largest music streaming services respectively in the country, in 2016. By 2018, QQ Music's market share among mainland China's music platforms increased to 75%.

Outside of streaming, the service leverages its brand to the public through the annual QQ Music Awards.

== Business service ==
QQ Music operates under a freemium business model in which basic services are free whilst enhanced features are available on a subscription. However unlike similar subscription service Spotify, labels have the ability to restrict its content to be restricted to subscribing users (known as VIPs or green diamonds) or be purchasable on their website which usually costs around 19 to 20 yuan. Artists using this strategy include Noah Cyrus, Ariana Grande and Taylor Swift in which certain albums are restricted to be purchased only.

QQ Music generally encourages users to purchase their VIP subscription service.

=== Accounts and subscriptions ===
As of March 2020, QQ Music offers three subscription types.

Type	Mobile and desktop listening	Sound quality	Listen offline	Overseas listening	Purchasable music	Customisation and themes (mobile feature)
QQ Music Free	Some songs.	128kbps streaming.	Some songs	No	No	No
QQ Music VIP	All songs (excludes purchased music)	Up to SQ lossless streaming.	Up to 300 downloadable songs per month.	Yes	Yes	Yes (no Luxury themes)
QQ Music Luxury	All songs (excludes purchased music)	Up to SQ lossless streaming.	Up to 500 downloadable songs per month.	Yes	Yes	Yes

=== Listening limitations （聆听限制） ===
QQ Music only operates in China, however, for an uncertain amount of time, the free service was freely available to be used worldwide, and many international users used the service in order to circumvent paid services such as Apple Music or Spotify. In 2016, to strengthen copyright restrictions, QQ Music blocked international users, and users overseas will generally receive an error message when trying to play music, such as: '抱歉，应版权方要求，暂无法在当前国家或地区提供此歌曲服务' ('Sorry, this song is not yet available in the current country or region at the request of the copyright owner'). In 2017, Alibaba Music and Tencent Music had a deal to collaborate on music copyright allowing Alibaba Music service Xiami and QQ Music to share exclusive copyright deals. However, Alibaba Music has exclusive rights to certain SM Entertainment Korean releases (such as Luna, EXO, EXO-CBX, Girls' Generation) meaning that QQ Music and other competing service's users will not be able to stream these songs. The rights to SM Entertainment music were returned as a shared entity to QQ Music when Tencent Music Entertainment and SM Entertainment signed a deal in 2019.

On September 6, 2023, QQ Music shut down their Penguin FM (企鹅FM) service preventing further sale or download of non-purchased content.

=== Downloads ===
Downloads on QQ Music are limited to some songs for free users. Labels can control whether free users can download their songs on the free plan or restrict downloading to the VIP plan. Downloads on the free plan are DRM-protected on both desktop and mobile whilst VIP downloads are free from DRM on desktops but are still protected over mobile platforms. When purchasing an album, a user is automatically entitled to the album and thus even if a VIP subscription ends, the user is still able to listen to the songs they purchased free of charge.

=== Technical information ===
QQ Music is proprietary and generally uses Digital Rights Management (DRM) protection.

Streams and downloads are in two formats, the MP3 media file system is used for standard quality streams and downloads at 128 kbit/s and 320 kbit/s for High Quality (abbreviated as HQ in China). The FLAC media file system is used for SQ streams and downloads. HQ and SQ streams and downloads are only available for the VIP and Luxury plans. SQ streams are not available on the QQMusic web player.

QQ Music also connects to the Music app on iOS systems and allows for users to combine their Local Files library with their QQ Music library through the download section of the app. Such feature also works on the desktop application where the QQ Music application will scan for local music files and allow users to play it via the application.

== Ban in India ==
In June 2020, the Government of India banned QQ Music with 58 other Chinese origin apps citing data and privacy issues. The border tensions in 2020 between India and China might have also played a role in the ban.

== See also ==
- JOOX (Tencent's foreign music streaming service)
