= Lay Zhang =

Chinese singer (born 1991)

- 张艺兴
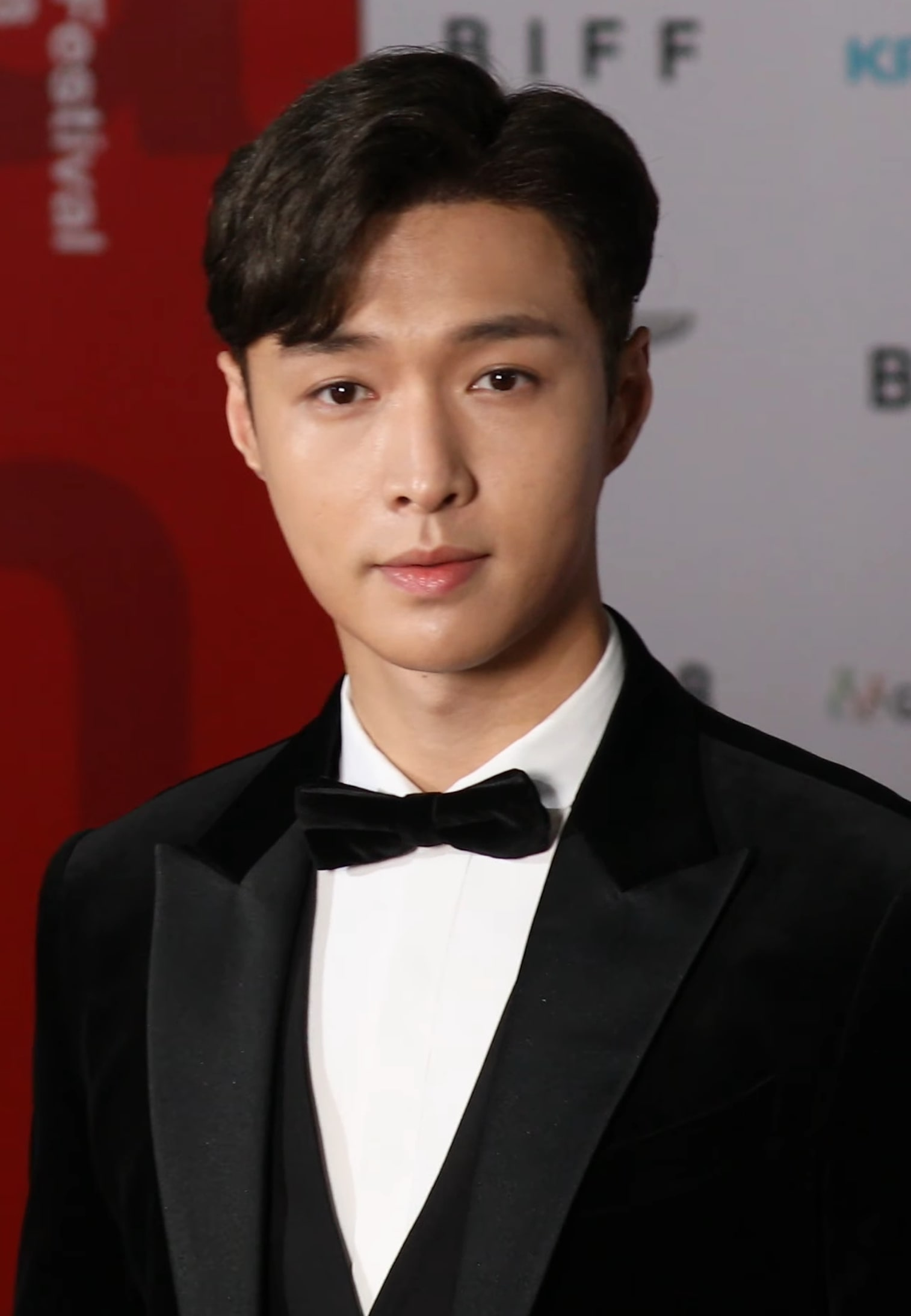
- Zhang in October 2018
- Born: Zhang Jiashuai; October 7, 1991 (age 35); Changsha, Hunan, China
- Occupations: Singer; songwriter; dancer; actor; record producer; businessman
- Years active: 1998–2006; 2012–present
- Musical career
- Genres: C-pop; hip-hop; K-pop; R&B; EDM
- Instruments: Vocals
- Labels: SM; Zhang Yixing Studio; Chromosome Entertainment Group; Range Media Partners
- Member of: Exo; Exo-M; SM Town

Chinese name
- Simplified Chinese: 张艺兴
- Traditional Chinese: 張藝興
Transcriptions
Standard Mandarin
- Hanyu Pinyin: Zhāng Yìxīng

Birth name
- Simplified Chinese: 张加帅
- Traditional Chinese: 張加帥
Transcriptions
Standard Mandarin
- Hanyu Pinyin: Zhāng Jiāshuài

Korean stage name
- Hangul: 레이
- RR: Rei
- MR: Rei

Signature
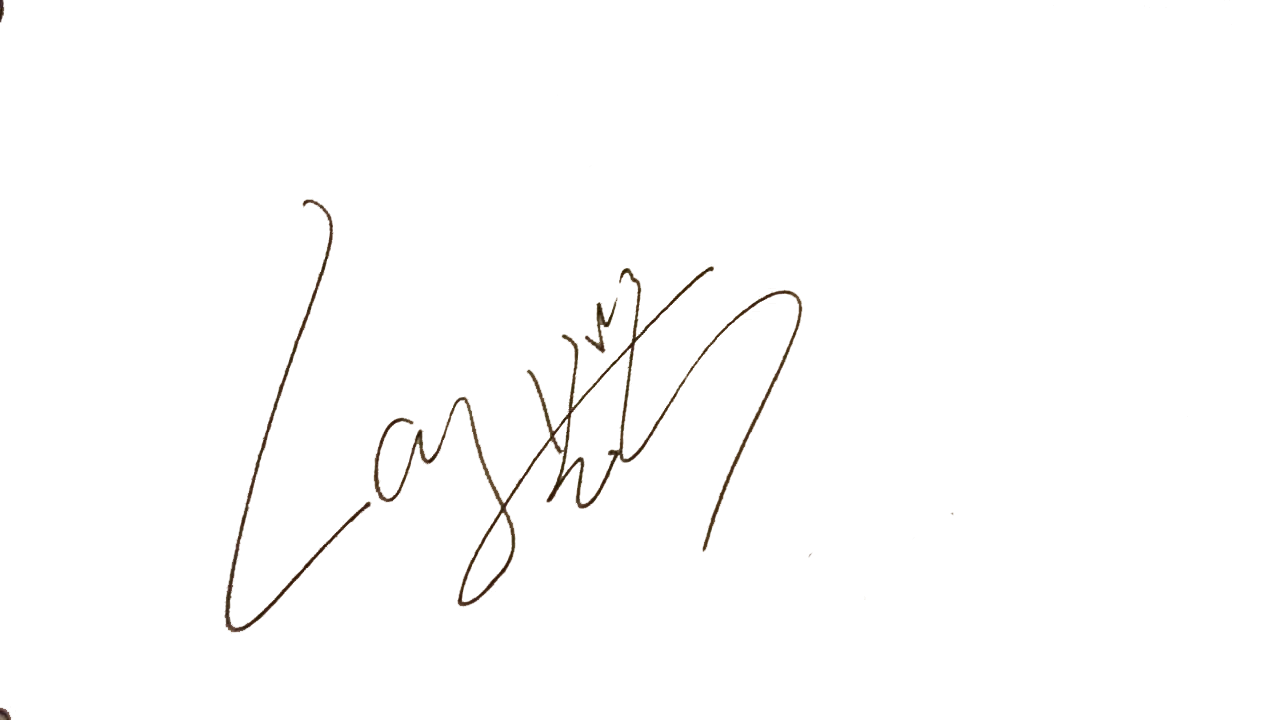

Zhang Yixing (Note: Chinese: 张艺兴; pinyin: Zhāng Yìxīng) (born Zhang Jiashuai; (Note: Chinese: 张加帅; pinyin: Zhāng Jiāshuài) October 7, 1991), known professionally as Lay Zhang or simply Lay, is a Chinese singer and actor. After participating in the Chinese talent show Star Academy in 2005, he became a member of the South Korean-Chinese boy band Exo and its Chinese sub-unit Exo-M under SM Entertainment in 2012. In 2015, Zhang founded a studio under SM for his solo activities in China. From 2015 to 2018, he was a cast member of the Chinese reality show Go Fighting! In 2016, Zhang released his first extended play (EP), Lose Control. In 2020, Zhang founded the Chromosome Entertainment Group. Zhang's acting credits include films and television shows, notably The Mystic Nine (2016), Kung Fu Yoga (2017), The Island (2018), and No More Bets (2023).

Zhang was ranked 20th in the Forbes China Celebrity 100 list in 2017, 11th in 2019, 5th in 2020, and 6th in 2021.

== Early life ==
Zhang Yixing was born Zhang Jiashuai in Changsha, Hunan, China on October 7, 1991. His legal name was later changed to Zhang Yixing.

== Career ==
Zhang is a Chinese singer and actor. After participating in the Chinese talent show Star Academy in 2005, he became a member of the South Korean-Chinese boy band Exo and its Chinese sub-unit Exo-M under SM Entertainment in 2012. Zhang was among the first four established Chinese K-pop stars to return China and spearhead the development of idols in Chinese entertainment.

=== 1998–2008: Career beginnings ===
Zhang's early acting roles included playing Huan Huan in the 1998 Chinese drama We The People at age six. In 2000, at age nine, Zhang participated in a Chinese television show as a fan club member of the Taiwanese singer and actor Jimmy Lin. Zhang gained recognition after finishing third in the 2005 competition on the show Star Academy. He also appeared in an episode of Yue Ce Yue Xin Kai and Liu Na's variety show Na Ke Bu Yi Yang between 2005 and 2006. In April 2006, Zhang auditioned for a role in The Duke of Mount Deer but did not secure the part.

In 2008, Zhang auditioned for SM Entertainment at the South Korean company's global casting audition in Wuhan. At the time, he was 16 years old and studying at the High School Attached to Hunan Normal University. After successfully passing the auditions, Zhang moved to South Korea to complete his idol training. In 2011, prior to his debut with Exo, he briefly worked with Shinee on their Shinee World Tour as Jonghyun's dance replacement.

=== 2012–2014: Debut with Exo ===
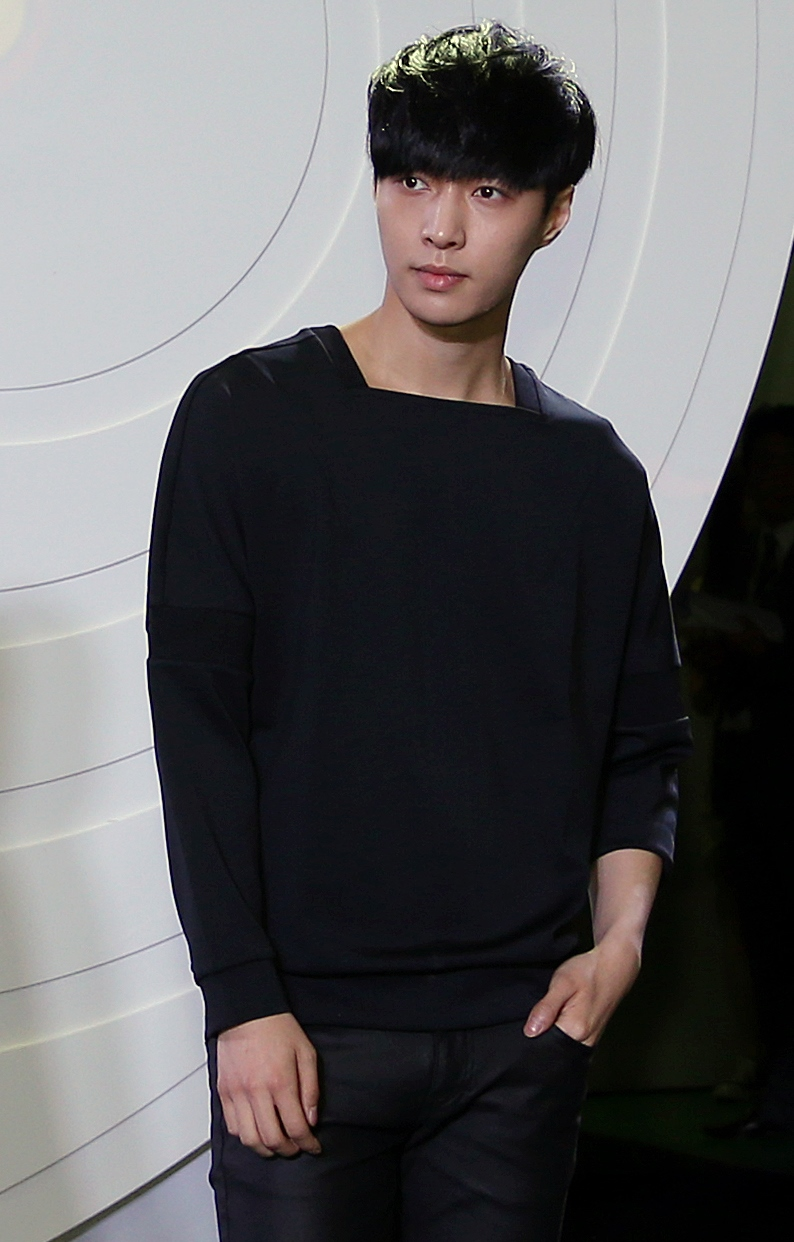
Zhang in 2014

Zhang debuted as a member of Exo under the stage name 'Lay', which he explained was inspired by the character Huaze Lei from Meteor Garden. Zhang was revealed as one of the four Chinese members of Exo through a teaser video in January 2012. After the release of Exo's singles What Is Love and History, the group held a pre-debut showcase at Seoul Olympic Stadium on March 31, 2012, as well as a second showcase and press conference at the Great Hall of the Beijing University of International Business and Economics. The group debuted on April 8, 2012, with the single "Mama", and Exo-M's first performance in China was publicly televised at the 12th Yinyue Fengyun Bang Awards.

In December 2012, Zhang was featured in SM Entertainment's project dance group SM the Performance alongside fellow Exo member Kai and labelmates Yunho, Eunhyuk, Donghae, Minho and Taemin. On December 29, the group performed their single "Spectrum", which was released the following day, at the 2011 SBS Gayo Daejeon.

Early in 2014, Zhang composed and performed the song "I'm Lay" for his solo performance during Exo's first headlining concert tour, The Lost Planet. Later that year, he performed another self-composed song, "I'm Coming", on a special year-end television program on Hunan TV. Zhang also composed the song "Promise" on the repackaged edition of Exo's second studio album, Love Me Right, and wrote the lyrics for the Chinese version of the song.

=== 2014–2015: Solo activities and film debut ===
In August 2014, Zhang appeared on the variety show Star Chef. In April 2015, SM Entertainment announced that a personal studio had been established for Zhang's activities in China. In May 2015, he became a regular cast member of the Chinese reality television show Go Fighting!. Zhang subsequently starred in the second, third, and fourth seasons of the show.

On September 18, the limited edition of Zhang's autobiography Standing Firm at 24 was published, while the standard edition became available on October 7. The book documented important events throughout his life and broke several online sales records, selling 68,537 copies in the first 24 minutes of pre-sales. Zhang placed fourth on the 10th Chinese Celebrity Writers List, the youngest celebrity author to enter the chart. He was first place in the 2015 installment of the Annual Celebrity Book Sales and ranked first Asia's Best Books twice on its monthly chart and six times on its weekly charts. Zhang's autobiography made Rakuten's lists, with 400,000 copies sold in six months.

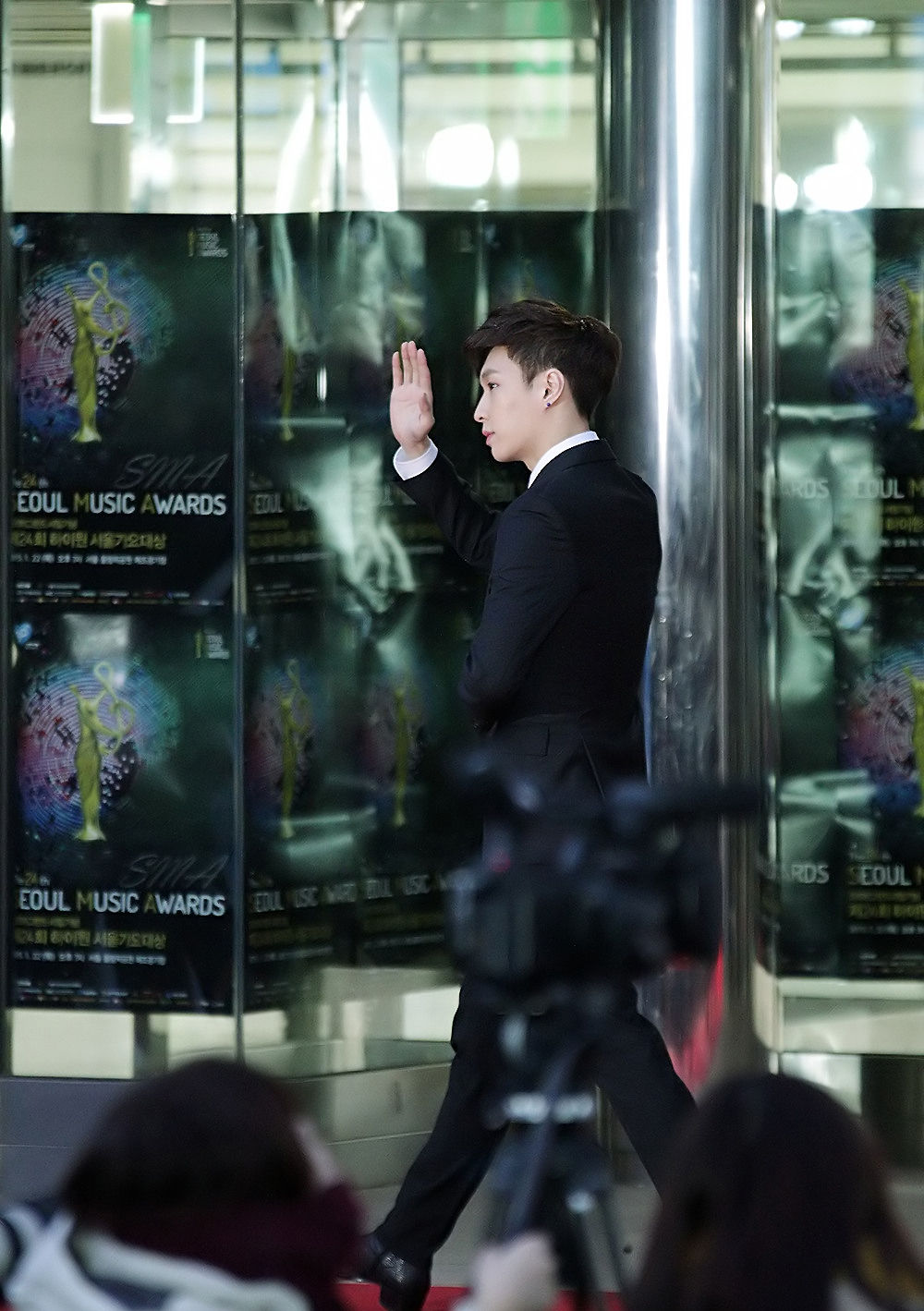
Zhang at the 24th Seoul Music Awards on January 22, 2015

In November 2015, Zhang made his film debut with a supporting role in the Chinese romantic comedy movie Ex-Files 2: The Backup Strikes Back. He later won the Best Supporting Actor Award at the 2016 China Britain Film Festival for his performance. He wrote and recorded an original soundtrack for the movie "Alone (One Person)", which reached number one on the Baidu Music Chart and later won Best Movie Original Soundtrack awards at the 16th Top Chinese Music Awards and 4th V-Chart Awards. Zhang starred in the Chinese comedy film Oh My God and collaborated with his co-stars Coco Jiang Wen and Li Xiaolu on an original soundtrack for the movie titled "Happy Youth", which debuted at number eight on the Billboard V Chart.

=== 2016: Rising popularity and solo debut ===
In January 2016, Zhang and the other cast members of Go Fighting! appeared in the Chinese movie Royal Treasure. In April 2016, he received the Most Popular Newcomer award at the 16th Top Chinese Music Awards. In May 2016, Zhang made his small screen debut in the Chinese television series To Be A Better Man. Written by Lay and co-composed and arranged with Divine Channel, "Monodrama" charted at number one on YinYueTai's V Chart. In July 2016, Zhang starred in the Chinese action mystery drama The Mystic Nine, a prequel to The Lost Tomb. The series achieved domestic success, placing first in television ratings and setting a record for the most online views garnered in a day. It has since accumulated over 12 billion total views. Zhang went on to star in a spin-off of the television series titled The Mystic Nine Side Story: Flowers Bloom in February, which focused solely on Zhang's character.

In October 2016, Zhang made his debut as a solo artist with the release of "What U Need?" as a surprise gift for his fans on his birthday. The song reached number four spot on the China V Chart and Billboard World Digital Songs chart. He performed it for the first time on October 10 at the 2016 Asia Song Festival in Busan, South Korea.

On October 28, Zhang released his debut extended play (EP) Lose Control, which contained six Mandarin tracks and the music video for the title song. Lay was involved in much of the production of the EP, participating in songwriting and arrangement as well as translating the original lyrics himself into English, Korean and Japanese. Pre-orders for Lose Control surpassed 200,000 copies, and it debut at number one on the Gaon Album Chart. It also reached number four on Billboard's US World Albums chart. Zhang performed "Lose Control" for the first time on the music program The Show on November 15.

=== 2017: Mainstream success ===
On January 27, 2017, Zhang performed at the CCTV Spring Gala Festival. The same month, Zhang appeared alongside Jackie Chan in the 2017 film Kung Fu Yoga. Zhang and Jackie Chan appeared in the music video for 'Goosebump' after the film's release.

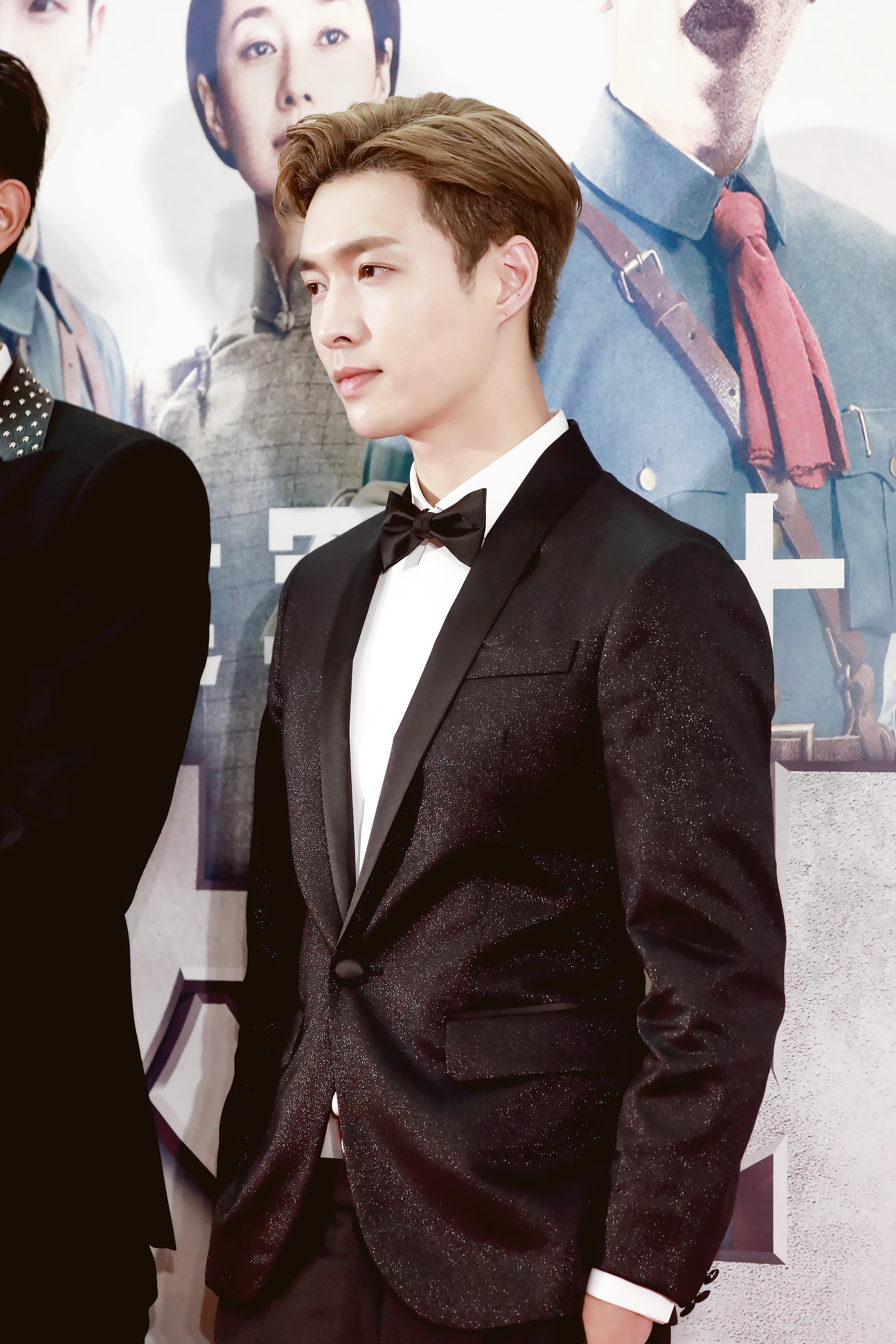
Zhang at press conference for The Founding of an Army on July 24, 2017

On February 17, 2017, Zhang performed with Exo during their Hong Kong concerts, before reducing his group activities due to solo commitments in China In April, Zhang appeared in The Founding of an Army, where his portrayal of Lu Deming was well received. Later in April, Zhang starred in the Chinese remake of the hit Japanese romance television series Operation Love. He composed and performed the song "Pray" for the drama. In July, Zhang provided the voice for Jackson Storm in the Chinese version of Cars 3.

On September 25, Zhang released the music video for 'I Need U', a pre-release track from Lay 02 Sheep. The music video performed well on Billboard's China Weibo Live Chart. The album was released on October 7 along with the music video for the song "Sheep". On its first day of digital sales, the album broke five records on QQ Music for the Gold, Double Gold, Triple Gold, Platinum and Diamond (¥5 million in 9 hours 11 minutes) certifications. Zhang held the 2017 Zhang Yixing Showcase at the Beijing National Aquatics Center, performing tracks from the album. In October, Zhang was announced to be starring as the male lead alongside label-mate Krystal Jung in the South Korean-Chinese romance film Unexpected Love.

On December 22, Zhang released his second EP, Winter Special Gift along with the music video for the lead single, "Goodbye Christmas". Within one day of digital sales, the album surpassed Gold, Double Gold, Triple Gold and Platinum sales marks on QQ Music. The album later surpassed the Diamond sales mark on the platform as well. The same month, Zhang was appointed as presenter and production director for iQiyi's talent program Idol Producer.

=== 2018: Debut in the United States ===
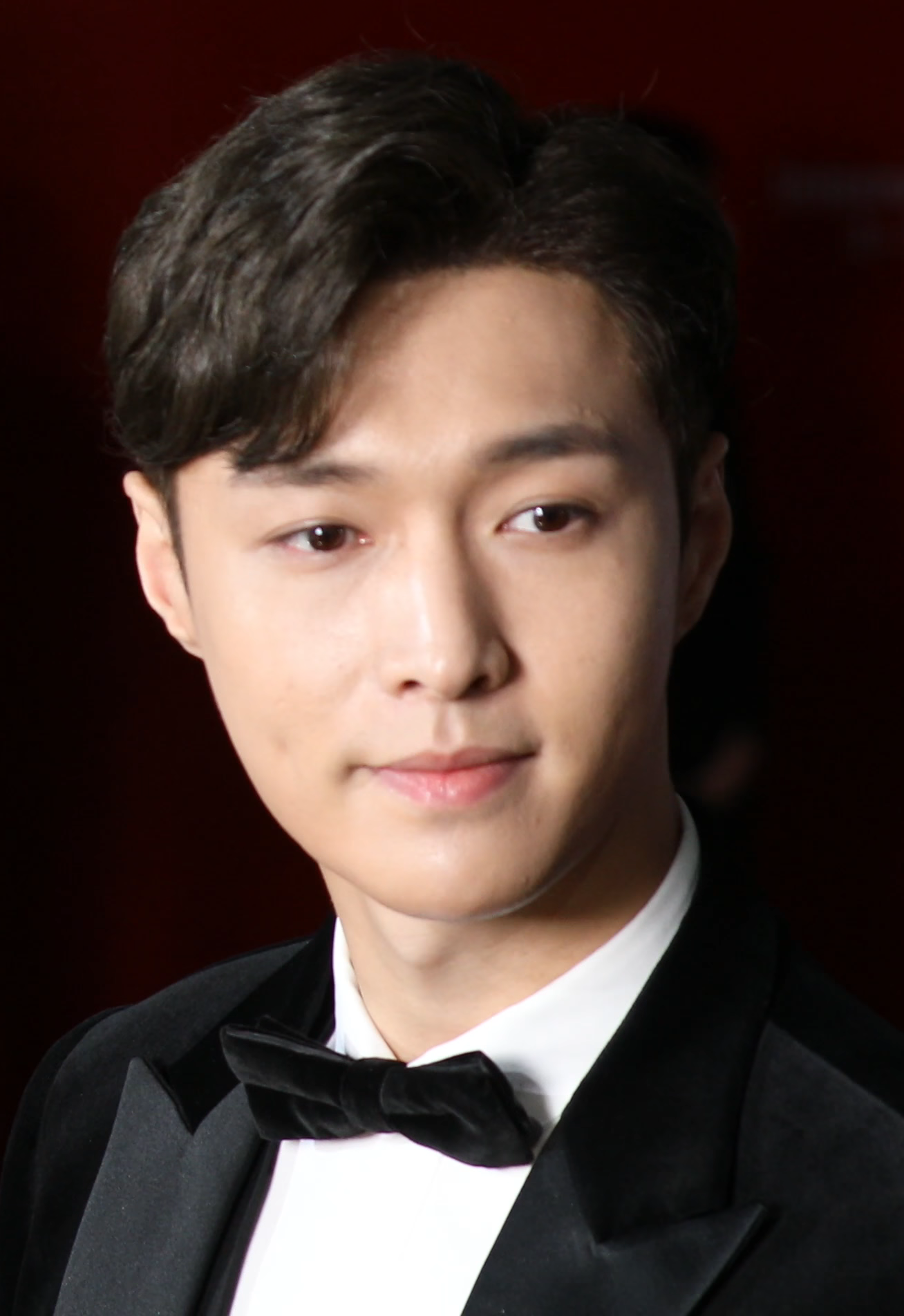
Zhang at Busan International Film Festival on October 4, 2018

On April 1, 2018, Zhang returned as one of the main cast in the fourth season of hit Chinese variety show Go Fighting!. He attended the 2018 CCTV New Year's Gala, where he performed a dance in collaboration with Huang Bo and William Chan. He also participated in the national anthem and its music video for Youth Day in China in May. In July, Zhang made a guest appearance for the web series The Tomb of Sea, where he portrayed a descendant of his character from the hit 2016 TV series The Mystic Nine. In August, Zhang starred in Huang Bo's commercially and critically successful directorial debut film The Island, where he received acclaim for his performance.

Zhang made his first appearance in the US at the music festival Lollapalooza, where he collaborated with DJ Alan Walker. The duo later collaborated on a remixed version of Zhang's previous single "Sheep", titled "Sheep Relift" and released on August 30.

Zhang's second album Namanana was released on October 19, with the pre-release single "Give Me a Chance" released on October 5. The album contained 22 songs, including a collaboration with American singer Bazzi, 11 of which are in the Chinese language with English versions of each. Namanana debuted at number 21 on Billboard 200, making Lay the highest ranked Mandopop artist on the chart. The album also placed first on the World Albums and Independent Albums charts. On December 24, Lay released a Christmas-themed digital single titled "When It's Christmas". The same month, he joined Chinese EDM talent show Rave Now as a mentor alongside Alan Walker.

=== 2019–2021: Solo concert tour and Chromosome Entertainment Group Establishment ===
On January 20, Zhang attended a Samsung event at the Mercedes-Benz Arena in Shanghai as the ambassador of Samsung Galaxy A8s and performed on-stage alongside ASAP Ferg and Steve Aoki. That month, Zhang returned as the production director and presenter of the Chinese survival show Idol Producer 2. On February 3, Zhang performed a Chinese New Year song with Dilraba Dilmurat, Phoenix Legend, Wallace Chung, and Zhou Dongyu at the 2019 CCTV New Year's Gala.

Zhang attended the 61st Annual Grammy Awards as its promotional ambassador on February 10, the only Chinese celebrity invited to the red carpet event and live ceremony. On February 26, a Michael Jackson tribute song titled "Let's Shut Up & Dance" was released by Zhang in collaboration with American singer Jason Derulo and South Korean band and SM Entertainment labelmate NCT 127. That same month, a third wax figure of Zhang was revealed in Madame Tussauds Hong Kong, following wax figures in Madame Tussauds Shanghai and Beijing. Zhang starred as the protagonist in the Chinese fantasy-adventure series The Golden Eyes. On March 15, Zhang released a digital single titled "Lovebird" as a collaborative song with American EDM and hip-hop group Far East Movement. On May 6, Zhang made his first appearance at the annual fashion exhibition Met Gala in New York City as an ambassador for Valentino, wearing a custom-made suit called "Time Traveller" designed by the house's creative director Pierpaolo Piccioli.

Zhang appeared as Emperor Yingzong of Ming in the historical drama Empress of the Ming in 2019. On June 14, Zhang released a digital EP titled Honey and its title track of the same name. The EP sold over 1.87 million digital copies three minutes after release on QQ Music, breaking his personal record for Namanana. It also earned QQ Music's Golden Hall status for surpassing nine sales levels and earning the Gold Diamond certification. Zhang embarked on his first international concert tour, Grand Line, in July 2019. Tickets for the concert at the Mercedes-Benz Arena in Shanghai sold out in eight seconds, while tickets for the Nanjing show sold out in twenty-five seconds. He also performed in Bangkok, Thailand. In December 2019, Zhang released the single "Grandmother (外婆)", which was a tribute to his grandmother who had died earlier in the year.

On March 19, 2020, Lay Zhang released the song "Love You More" with artists Steve Aoki and Will.i.am and featuring Jessica Carrie Lee as part of Aoki's Neon Future IV album. On June 1, 2020, Zhang released the first part of his fourth album, Lit; the second part was released on July 21, 2020. In June 2020, Zhang won the competition of iQiyi's I'm a Singer-Songwriter 2. He also appeared as a producer mentor on Youku's We are Young. In August 2020, Zhang started appearing as a mentor and captain in the third season of the Chinese dance survival show Street Dance of China. He also filmed for the drama Challenges at Midlife.

On October 7, 2020, Zhang officially announced the establishment of his entertainment company, Chromosome Entertainment Group. Through its official accounts on Twitter, Weibo, and Instagram, the company revealed a trainee selection program modeled after the one Zhang participated in under SM Entertainment. Several celebrities expressed their congratulatory remarks to Zhang's new venture, including the founder and former CEO of SM Entertainment, Lee Soo-man. Zhang released his fourth studio album, Producer, on February 5, 2021, with lead single "Joker" released four days prior. The album featured studio versions of the songs he composed for his appearance in the second season of I'm a Singer-Songwriter. On June 7, 2021, after a three-year absence from Exo, Zhang appeared in their EP Don't Fight the Feeling. On October 7, 2021, Zhang released the single "Samadhi Real Fire", the pre-release single for his new EP East, which was released on October 15.

=== 2022: Departure from SM Entertainment and second world tour ===
On February 22, 2022, Zhang released the collaborative album Dawn to Dusk with 24kGoldn. On February 23, the drama Challenges at Midlife was aired on Oriental Satellite TV, Zhejiang Satellite TV and Youku. Zhang starred as a young man with a double-faced character in the drama. It was his first TV series to play the villain. On April 8, 2022, Zhang released the song "酒(JIU)" in celebration of Exo 10th Year Debut Anniversary. That same day, he concluded his ten-year contract with SM Entertainment and personally stated that would remain active with Exo in the future. On April 22, he returned to the 6th season of the variety show Back to the Field as a regular cast member. On May 15, it was announced that he would star in the online film Chinese Youth: Me and My Youth to celebrate the 100th anniversary of the Communist Youth League, he plays the painter Xu Mai in the first unit, Flag. On May 31, he collaborated with former NBA player Nick Young and released the theme song "Time To Shine" to pay tribute to the 75th anniversary of the NBA. The MV of the song was later played on the Jumbotron in Chase Center during the NBA Finals on June 6.

On July 23 to celebrate his 10-year debut anniversary, Zhang held an online concert, Grandline Sailing · FIREWORK. He donated his portion of the profits to charity in the name of his fans.

On September 21, 2022, Zhang released the music video for the song "Veil", the title track of his EP West (西), which he released five days later on September 26, 2022.

Starting in mid-October, Zhang held his second concert tour, Grandline II · Infinite lands in Kuala Lumpur, Malaysia, Singapore, Bangkok, Thailand and San Francisco, USA respectively.

On November 23, he was invited to a seminar at Harvard Business School, during which he shared thoughts about Asian culture and M-POP music. On November 26, Zhang headlined the 1st MetaMoon Music Festival which was set to showcase AAPI and Asian artists and culture, at Barclays Center in New York. On December 31, he performed "ChangSha" and "Veil" at the Dream Oriental 2023 Oriental Satellite TV New Year's Eve Ceremony.

=== 2023–present: Acting activities, expansion in Hollywood, return to Korea ===
On January 15, 2023, Zhang attended the "2023 Hunan Satellite TV Mango TV Spring Festival Gala" of which he is the spokesperson and performed "Veil" and "Song of Xinlu Mountain". On January 18, he attended the "2022 Weibo Music Ceremony" and was awarded "Artist of the Year". He also performed the song "Cypher I" with labelmates from D. N. A factory, which Zhang founded and officially announced in February 2023 on his social media accounts. On January 24, he participated in the "New Journey - 2023 China Online Audio-Visual Annual Ceremony". On March 10, the suspense crime film See You at Dawn starring Zhang, Shu Qi and Tony Leung Ka-fai was officially filmed in Pingtan, Fujian Province. In the film, Zhang played Lin Zang, an out-of-town man who had a lot to do with a series of murders.

On March 28, he was invited to the watch exhibition "Watches and Wonders" 2023 in Geneva as the ambassador for Hublot. He also visited the Hublot headquarters factory and experienced the work of a professional watchmaker the following day. As a distinguished guest of the exhibition, Zhang's trip to Geneva also appeared on the official website of "Watches and Wonders". On April 21, Zhang attended The 13th Beijing International Film Festival, along with Jackie Chan and other cast from the movie they starred in, The Legend. On April 28, the film Changsha Nightlife is scheduled to be released. Zhang played stand-up comedian He An in the film.

After working as producer since Chromosome was founded in 2020, Zhang officially debut his first artist Le'v in August 2023. In September 2023, Zhang signed with American entertainment company Range Media Partners. Zhang also stated that he would expand his activities in Hollywood. In April 2024, Zhang would make his comeback in Korea's music scene with a new album in mid-April and plans to promote on music shows, with former SM producer Jung Chang-wan provided his activities are under the producer's company n.cH Entertainment.

In late 2025, Zhang returned to Exo and participated in their eighth studio album, Reverxe, including its lead single "Crown", which was released on January 19, 2026, marking his first major group release since Don't Mess Up My Tempo in 2018.

== Artistry ==
=== Songwriting ===
Zhang has composed and produced numerous songs, including "Exo 2014" by Exo and the tracks on each of his solo albums and EPs Lose Control, Lay 02 Sheep, Winter Special Gift, Namanana., Honey, Lit, East, and West. He also wrote and composed his 2015 SM Station single "Monodrama". Zhang composed "Alone", the original soundtrack for his 2015 romantic-comedy film Ex-Files 2, as well as "Prayer", for his 2017 Chinese web-drama Operation Love. He also helped compose the songs "Not to be Continued" by Chinese singer Karen Mok, which was released in May 2018 for her 25th anniversary album, and MC Jin's single "Debut" in the same year. Zhang has also written songs for Yu Quan and Show Luo. In April 2018, Zhang won the Best Producer award at the Chinese Top Ten Music Awards, revealing in an interview that at one point he lost over 99 unreleased self-composed tracks.

=== Musical style ===
Many of Zhang's released songs contain elements of traditional Chinese music, such as the instruments hulusi, guzheng and gong. Zhang mentioned in an interviews that he considers his main genre to be M-pop, which stands for "Mix Mandarin popular music" and blends different languages. One example is his collaborative single with American EDM and hip-hop group Far East Movement titled "Lovebird", which contains both the English and Mandarin languages. "The Assembly Call", the opening track of his 2018 album Namanana, is an instrumental that showcases different traditional Chinese sounds and music.

Zhang has frequently been associated with his Chinese zodiac sign, the sheep, which he has used throughout his solo career and most notably on his 2017 solo album Lay 02 Sheep and its lead single "Sheep". He has been nicknamed "little sheep" in China by fans and media.

== Personal life ==
In his autobiography, Standing Firm at 24, Zhang revealed that he struggled with anxiety when performing on stage but was able to face his fears and overcome them through his dedication to training and working hard alongside the rest of the members of Exo. He also revealed that while he had received some formal instruction in learning the guitar and piano, he was mostly self-taught.

Zhang supports the One China policy and "is against any acts or words that split his country." In August 2019, during the 2019–20 Hong Kong protests, Zhang expressed support for the Hong Kong police and declared himself "one of 1.4 billion guardians of the Chinese flag" on his official Weibo account.

== Other activities ==
=== Endorsements and partnerships ===
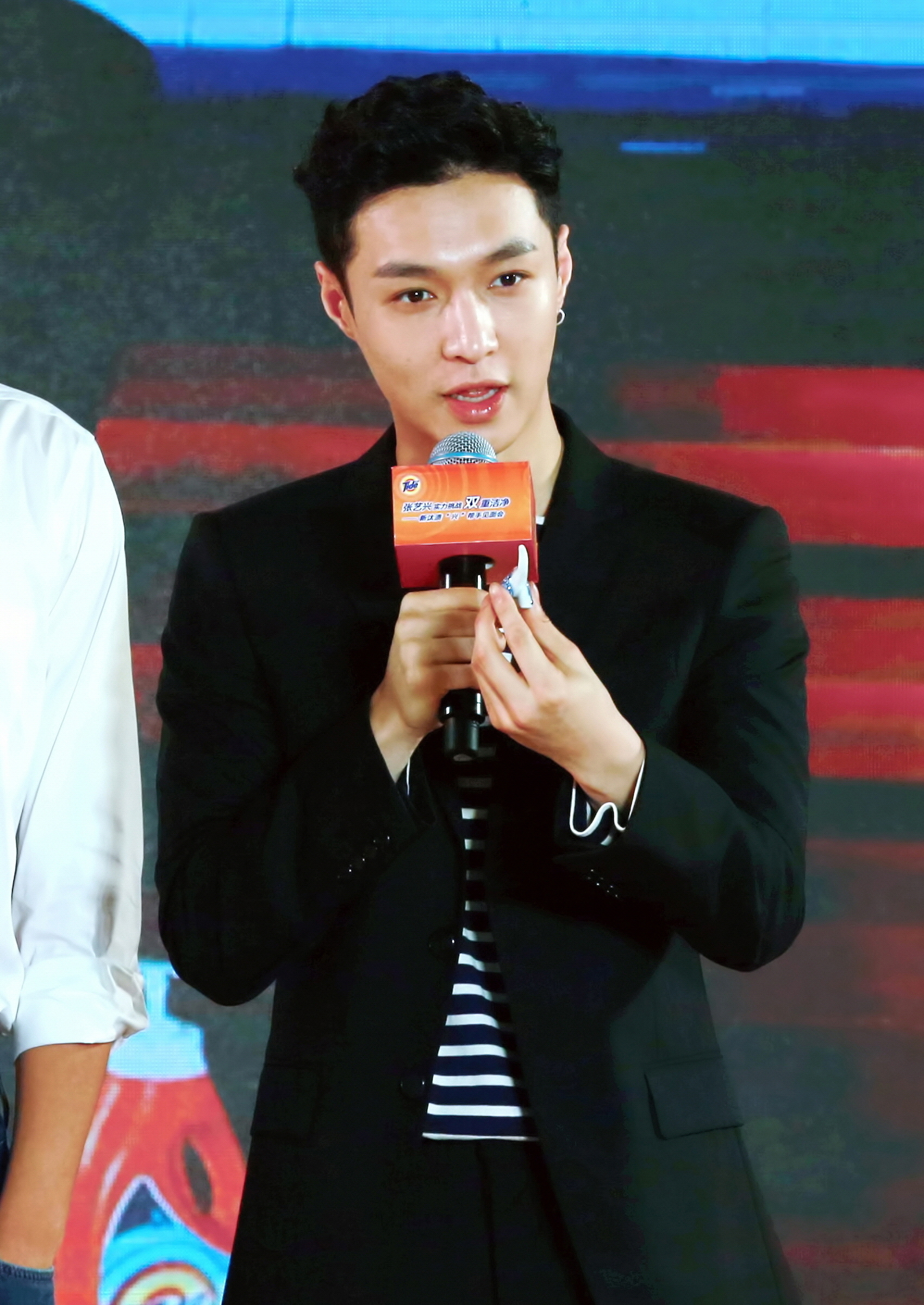
Zhang promoting a brand on April 1, 2017

As of March 2023, Zhang has been the spokesman/ambassador for over 50 brands. Current endorsements include: Hublot, Bang & Olufsen, Biotherm Homme, Epson, Wedgwood, Fila, Decorte, Calbee, etc. Past endorsements include: Chaumet, Valentino, Dell computer, Calvin Klein, Daniel Wellington, Ballantine's, Burger King, Oral-B, Pizza Hut, Converse, MAC Cosmetics, Ray-Ban, Milka Chocolate, H&M, Perrier, etc.

He was Calvin Klein's first Chinese global spokesperson for their underwear and jean lines. Additionally, as an ambassador of high-end fashion house Valentino, Zhang attended multiple fashion shows and events in Asia and Europe, as well at the annual Met Gala. He has also was a promotional ambassador for Huawei Nova from 2015 to 2018. Zhang was appointed as a publicity ambassador for the Communist Youth League of China in Changsha in July 2016. He has been publicity ambassador for five consecutive years. In October 2017, Zhang signed a contract with the vice president of Tencent Music Entertainment Group and became a member of "Music+ Plan" (Music+ 计划). On June 6, 2024, Zhang was appointed as the culture and tourism ambassador of the Hunan province.

=== Philanthropy ===
In February 2015, Zhang participated in the "Return Home with Love for A Thousand Miles", a large-scale public welfare activities and volunteer project. The project included on-site delivery of relief supplies to labor workers which helps them return home faster and to help labor workers in a timely manner to reinforce physical safety. On May 2, Zhang established his own foundation entitled, "Zhang Yixing Arts Scholarship" on behalf of providing scholarship for his alma mater middle school, Hunan Masters College Middle School where he will donate 100 thousand yuan annually. His intentions were encourage talented youth to pursue their dreams. On September 7, Zhang responded to a campus soccer public welfare project, "Summit of Hope" ("希望之颠"). He uploaded a video on his Weibo account in an attempt to publicize the project.

On February 1, 2016, Zhang donated an undisclosed amount to a joint Weibo public welfare funding project (#一起9加1#) which aids impoverished families for the upcoming Lunar New Year. In March 2016, during the second season of Go Fighting!, Zhang and the other cast members visited a community-run migrant worker dependent school located in Chuansha Xin Town of Shanghai as part of the "Go Fighting Welfare Development Project" ("极限公益成长计划"). The initiative donated more than 1.2 million yuan worth of materials for over 12 schools nationwide. On May 1, Zhang participated in the Youku "Go Fighting Minute Challenge" public welfare project on Weibo where he sent greetings to as many friends and families as possible in one minute and urged the public to express positive energy and to donate to charity. He donated another 1 million yuan and a piano to his alma mater. Later that year, in conjunction with the 10th anniversary of his alma mater, Zhang once more donated another 1 million yuan to his scholarship foundation. On July 2, Zhang was honorably appointed as the Publicity Ambassador of the Communist Youth League of China (CYLC), expressed that he will dedicate himself to his appointment and appealed to the public to do charity through singing the national anthem. On September 9, Zhang attended the 2016 BAZAAR Stars' Charity Night which resulted in him donating 10 ambulances with worth amounting to 700 thousand yuan. Due to his charitable contributions, Zhang was ranked number 15th by the China Philanthropist Magazine in the '2016 China's Top Philanthropist Celebrity List'.

On September 9, 2017, Zhang attended the 2017 BAZAAR Stars' Charity Night and donated 15 ambulances, valued at 1.05 million yuan. In January 2018, he starred in a public welfare movie I'm Beside You, in which he sang and composed the theme song. On March 30, 2018, he starred as a guest recitalist in CCTV's Trust in China talk show. Zhang ranked number 18 by the China Philanthropist Magazine in the 2017 China's Top Philanthropist Celebrity List. In January 2018, Zhang participated as a cameo in the campaign movie For Love With You; the theme song of the movie, "I'm By Your Side", was sung by Zhang.

== Discography ==
=== Albums ===
- Lay 02 Sheep (2017)
- Namanana (2018)
- Lit (2020)
- Producer (2021)
- Step (2024)
- Rock the Heavenly Palace (2025)
- Flawed Crown (2026)

== Filmography ==
=== Film ===
Year	English title	Original title	Role	Notes	Ref.
2015	SMTOWN The Stage		Himself	Documentary of SM Town	
2015	Ex-Files 2: The Backup Strikes Back	前任2：备胎反击战	Lee Xianghe	Cameo	
2015	Oh My God	从天儿降	Le Yi		
2016	Royal Treasure	极限挑战	Himself		
2016	The Mystic Nine Side Story: Flowers Bloom in February	老九门番外之二月花开	Er Yuehong	Web film	
2017	Kung Fu Yoga	功夫瑜伽	Zhu Xiaoguang		
2017	The Founding of an Army	建军大业	Lu Deming	Cameo	
2017	Cars 3		Jackson Storm	Chinese voice dub	
2018	For Love With You	一切如你		Campaign movie; cameo	
2018	The Island	一出好戏	Xiao Xing		
2023	Tale of the Night	长沙夜生活	He An 何岸	Cameo	
2023	Chinese Youth: Me and My Youth	中国青年：我和我的青春	Xu Mai 许麦	Cameo; web film	
2023	No More Bets	孤注一掷	Pan Sheng		
2024	A Legend	传说	Wang Jing/Huajun		
2026	Kung Fu Soccer	功夫女足	Xu Feng		
TBA	Unexpected Love	闭嘴！爱吧	Han Bin	South Korean-Chinese film	
TBA	See You at Dawn	黎明时分见			

=== Television series ===
Year	English title	Original title	Role	Notes	Ref.
1998	We The People	咱老百姓	Huan Huan	Pre-debut	
2012	To the Beautiful You		Himself	Cameo; episode 2	
2015	Exo Next Door	우리 옆집에 엑소가 산다	Himself	Special appearance	
2016	To Be A Better Man	好先生	Xiao Cai (Cai Mingjun)		
2016	The Mystic Nine	老九门	Er Yuehong		
2017	Operation Love	求婚大作战	Yan Xiaolai		
2018	The Tomb of Sea	沙海	Jie Yuchen	Special appearance	
2019	The Golden Eyes	黄金瞳	Zhuang Rui		
2019	Empress of the Ming	大明风华	Zhu Qizhen		
2021	Faith Makes Great	理想照耀中国	Xiong Dachen	Special appearance	
2021	Challenges at Midlife	相逢时节	Ning Shu		
2021	Crime Crackdown	扫黑风暴	Lin Hao		

=== Variety shows ===
Year	English title	Original title	Role	Notes	Ref.
2014	Star Chef	星厨驾到	Contestant		
2015–2020	Go Fighting!	极限挑战	Main cast	Season 1–6	
2018	Idol Producer	偶像练习生	Main mentor, presenter		
2018	Rave Now	即刻电音	Mentor		
2019	Youth With You	青春有你	Main mentor, presenter	Idol Producer, Season 2	
2020	I'm CZR II	我是唱作人2	Premiere Singer-songwriter		
2020	We Are Young	少年之名	Main mentor, presenter		
2020	Street Dance Of China	这 就是街舞	Team captain	Season 3	
2020	Let's Chat	一起火锅吧	Main cast	Season 1	
2020	Dance Smash	舞蹈风暴	Smash leader, Dance witness	Season 2	
2021	Youth and Melody	金曲青春	Producer		
2021	Back to Field	向往的生活	Main cast	Season 5	
2021	Street Dance of China	这 就是街舞	Team captain	Season 4	
2021	Let's Chat	一起火锅吧	Main cast	Season 2	
2022	Back to Field	向往的生活	Main cast	Season 6	
2024	Show It All	百分百出品	Mentor		

== Concert tours ==
- Grand Line: The First Concert (2019)
- Grand Line: Infinite Lands (2022)
- Grand Line: Boundless (2023)
- Grand Line: Step (2024)
- Grand Line: Rock the Heavenly Palace (2025)

== Bibliography ==
Year	Title	Notes	ISBN
October 1, 2015	Standing Firm at 24	Autobiography	ISBN 978-7550260917
