= Focus =

Focus (pl.: foci or focuses) most commonly refers to:

- Attention
- Focus (optics), a point toward which rays are made to converge

Focus may also refer to:

== Arts ==
=== Film ===
- Focus (2001 film), based on the Arthur Miller novel
- Focus (2015 film), about con artists

=== Music ===
==== Albums ====
- Focus (Stan Getz album), 1961 jazz album
- Focus (Bill Hardman album), 1984 jazz album
- Focus (Jan Akkerman & Thijs van Leer album), 1985
- Focus (Cynic album), 1993 metal album
- Focus (Chico Freeman album), 1994 jazz album
- Focus (Souls of Mischief album), 1998 alternative hip-hop album
- Focus (Holly Starr album), 2012 CCM album
- Focus (Arthur Blythe album), 2002 jazz album
- Focus (Diaura album), 2013 Japanese visual kei album
- Focus (Jus2 EP), 2019
- Focus (Hearts2Hearts EP), 2025

==== Songs ====
- "Focus" (Ariana Grande song), 2015
- "Focus" (Bazzi song), 2019
- "Focus" (Craig David song), 2018
- "Focus" (Hearts2Hearts song), 2025
- "Focus" (H.E.R. song), 2017
- "Focus" (Jacob Whitesides song), 2016
- "Focus / No Angel", a 2018 single by Charli XCX
- "Focus", by Joe Budden
- "Focus", by Susumu Hirasawa from Paranoia Agent Original Soundtrack
- "Focus", by Kim Dong-han from D-Hours AM 7:03
- "Focus", by 10 Years from Division
- "Focus", by Itzy from Tunnel Vision
- "The Focus", by Failure, from The Heart Is a Monster, 2015

==== Other uses in music ====
- Focus (music), a musical technique also known as modal frame
- Focus..., American music producer
- Focus (band), Dutch progressive rock band

=== Writing ===
- Focus (encyclopedia), a 1958 Swedish language encyclopedia
- Focus (novel), 1945, by Arthur Miller

=== Other uses in arts ===
- Focus or Focus Festival, former name of the Adelaide Fringe arts festival in East Australia

== Companies, brands, organizations ==
- Anti-Nazi Council, a 1930s British-based organisation operated by a group known as Focus in Defence of Freedom and Peace, sometimes called the Focus Group, including Winston Churchill
- Focus DIY, a UK chain of do-it-yourself stores
- Focus.com, a business social networking platform
- Focus Brands, American restaurant franchiser and operator
- FOR Organizing Committee of the United States, an American post-Trotskyist group, known as FOCUS
- Focus Humanitarian Assistance, an international emergency relief organization
- Focus Ireland, Irish nonprofit organization providing services for homeless people
- Focus on the Family, an American non-profit organization
- Focus Services, an international call center company
- Fellowship of Catholic University Students, a Catholic outreach program for American college students founded in 1997
- Focus Software, former name of Zemax Development Corporation, a maker of optical design software
- Focus Home Interactive, a French publisher of computer games
- Families OverComing Under Stress, a stress management program
- Focus Bikes, a German bicycle manufacturer
- Ford Focus, an international Ford automobile
- Focus (board game), an abstract strategy game
- Focus (Croatian political party), a political party in Croatia
- The Focus Foundation, an American research and support foundation
- Samsung Focus, a smartphone manufactured by Samsung which runs Microsoft Windows Phone

== Mass media ==
- 3+ Focus, a Swiss German-language television channel
- Focus (TV channel), an Italian television channel
- Focus Features, the art house films division of NBC Universal's Universal Studios
- Focus Films, UK independent film producer

=== Written ===
- BBC Focus, a monthly science and technology magazine
- Focus (German magazine), a German weekly news magazine
- Focus (Italian magazine), an Italian monthly popular science magazine
- Focus (Polish magazine), a Polish scientific monthly magazine
- Focus (Christian magazine)
- Focus (Ukrainian magazine), a national Ukrainian weekly news magazine
- Focus Taiwan, of the Central News Agency
- Fokus (magazine), a Swedish magazine
- San Francisco Focus, a monthly magazine

== Science and technology ==
=== Computing and mathematics ===
- Focus (computing), which of a number of GUI elements currently accepts keyboard input
- Focus (programming language), a database reporting program
- HP FOCUS, a CPU architecture
- Helicon Focus, an image software program
- Focus (geometry), a key point in specifying a conic section or other plane curve
- Firefox Focus, a privacy-focused browser from Mozilla
- Focus number system, a logarithmic number system proposed in 1977

=== Social sciences ===
- Focus (linguistics), the way information in one phrase relates to information that has come before
- Focus group, a form of qualitative research in which a group of people are asked about their attitude towards a product, service, concept, advertisement, idea, or packaging

=== Other sciences ===
- Epileptic focus in epilepsy
- Focus (earthquake), an earthquake's underground point of origin or hypocenter

=== Military technology ===
- AGM-87 Focus, a U.S. Navy air-to-surface missile
- Operation Focus, the Israeli name for the attack against the Egyptian Air Force in the Six-Day War

== Other uses ==
- Focus mitt, a padded target attached to a glove and usually used in training boxers and other combat athletes
- Focus, in Final Fantasy XIII, a task given to L'Cie to grant eternal life upon completion, or the life of a mindless Cieth on failure
- Fokus, a Danish political party
- Focus (name)
- FOCUS Program, a voluntary study program at numerous American universities
- Focus (Warsaw), an office building in Warsaw, Poland

== See also ==
- Focus group, a group interviewed to analyse opinions
  - Focus Group (disambiguation)
- Hyperfocus, an intense form of mental concentration on a subject, topic, or task
- Strong focusing, a principle in accelerator physics
- Focal (disambiguation)
- Focused (disambiguation)
- Focusing (disambiguation)
- Focal point (disambiguation)
- Fantasy Focus (disambiguation)
