= Focus Group (disambiguation) =

A focus group is a group interview involving a small number of demographically similar people or participants who have other common traits/experiences.

Focus Group may also refer to:

- Anti-Nazi Council, a 1930s organisation operated by a group known as Focus in Defence of Freedom and Peace or the Focus Group
- Focus Group Holdings Limited, a Hong Kong film and artist management company
- The Focus Group, a project of experimental electronic musician and graphic designer Julian House.
- The Focus Group (business), a British clothing and accessories company
- "The Focus Group" (Frasier episode), an episode of season 3 of American sitcom Frasier

== See also ==
- Online focus group, a type of focus group
- Focus (disambiguation)
