= 2019 MTV Movie & TV Awards =

American awards show

- Date: June 17, 2019 (airing) June 15, 2019 (taping)
- Location: Barker Hangar, Santa Monica, California
- Country: United States
- Hosted by: Zachary Levi

Highlights
- Most awards: Avengers: Endgame (3)
- Most nominations: Avengers: Endgame (4); RBG (4); Game of Thrones (4)

Television/radio coverage
- Network: MTV, MTV2, VH1, CMT, BET, MTV Classic, TV Land, Comedy Central, Nick at Nite, Paramount Network and Logo
- Produced by: Tenth Planet
- Directed by: Joel Gallen

The 2019 MTV Movie & TV Awards ceremony took place June 15, 2019 at the Barker Hangar in Santa Monica, California, with host Zachary Levi, and was broadcast two days later on June 17, 2019. It was the 28th edition of the awards and the third to jointly honor movies and television.

== Performers ==
MTV announced Lizzo's performance on May 16, 2019, alongside a performance by Martin Garrix with Macklemore and Patrick Stump of Summer Days, but on June 10, it was announced that they would no longer perform and Bazzi would perform instead.

- Lizzo – "Juice"
- Bazzi – "Paradise"

== Presenters ==
- Gal Gadot – presented Most Frightened Performance
- Zachary Levi – presented Generation Award
- Shameik Moore – presented Best Host
- Melissa McCarthy, Tiffany Haddish, and Elisabeth Moss – introduced Lizzo performance
- B. Simone – presented Most Meme-able Moment (red carpet)
- Nick Kroll and Trixie Mattel – presented Reality Royalty
- Kumail Nanjiani and Dave Bautista – presented Best Fight
- Tiffany Haddish – presented Trailblazer Award
- Daniel Levy and Annie Murphy – presented Best Performance in a Movie
- Kiernan Shipka, Ross Lynch, and Gavin Leatherwood – presented Best Kiss
- Anna Graves – announced Best Hero (commercial reveal)
- Jameela Jamil and MJ Rodriguez – presented Best Documentary
- Josh Horowitz – presented Best Show (red carpet)
- Cast of Euphoria – introduced Bazzi performance
  (Storm Reid, Maude Apatow, Algee Smith, Sydney Sweeney, Alexa Demie, Hunter Schafer, and Barbie Ferreira)
- Haley Lu Richardson – presented Best Performance in a Show
- Finn Wolfhard, Gaten Matarazzo, and Noah Schnapp – presented Best Breakthrough Performance
- Aubrey Plaza and David Spade – presented Best Comedic Performance
- Tessa Thompson – presented Best Movie

== Winners and nominees ==
The full list of nominees was announced on May 14, 2019. Winners are listed first, in bold.

Best Movie	Best Show
**Avengers: Endgame**; BlacKkKlansman; Spider-Man: Into the Spider-Verse; To All the Boys I've Loved Before; Us	**Game of Thrones**; Big Mouth; The Haunting of Hill House; Riverdale; Schitt's Creek
Best Performance in a Movie	Best Performance in a Show
**Lady Gaga – A Star Is Born**; Sandra Bullock – Bird Box; Lupita Nyong'o – Us; Rami Malek – Bohemian Rhapsody; Amandla Stenberg – The Hate U Give	**Elisabeth Moss – The Handmaid's Tale**; Emilia Clarke – Game of Thrones; Gina Rodriguez – Jane the Virgin; Kiernan Shipka – Chilling Adventures of Sabrina; †~~Jason Mitchell~~ – ~~The Chi~~
Best Comedic Performance	Best Hero
**Dan Levy – Schitt's Creek**; Awkwafina – Crazy Rich Asians; John Mulaney – Big Mouth; Marsai Martin – Little; Zachary Levi – Shazam!	**Robert Downey Jr. – Avengers: Endgame**; Brie Larson – Captain Marvel; John David Washington – BlacKkKlansman; Maisie Williams – Game of Thrones; Zachary Levi – Shazam!
Best Villain	Best Kiss
**Josh Brolin –** **Avengers: Endgame**; Penn Badgley – You; Jodie Comer – Killing Eve; Joseph Fiennes – The Handmaid's Tale; Lupita Nyong'o – Us	**Noah Centineo and Lana Condor – To All the Boys I've Loved Before**; Jason Momoa and Amber Heard – Aquaman; Charles Melton and Camila Mendes – Riverdale; Ncuti Gatwa and Connor Swindells – Sex Education; Tom Hardy and Michelle Williams – Venom
Most Frightened Performance	Best Reality Royalty
**Sandra Bullock – Bird Box**; Linda Cardellini – The Curse of La Llorona; Rhian Rees – Halloween; Victoria Pedretti – The Haunting of Hill House; Alex Wolff – Hereditary	Love & Hip Hop: **Atlanta**; Jersey Shore: Family Vacation; The Bachelor; The Challenge; Vanderpump Rules
Best Documentary	Best Fight
**Surviving R. Kelly**; At the Heart of Gold: Inside the USA Gymnastics Scandal; McQueen; Minding the Gap; RBG	**Brie Larson vs. Gemma Chan – Captain Marvel**; Josh Brolin vs. Chris Evans – Avengers: Endgame; Maisie Williams vs. White Walkers – Game of Thrones; Ruth Bader Ginsburg vs. Inequality – RBG; Becky Lynch vs. Ronda Rousey vs. Charlotte Flair – WrestleMania 35
Best Host	Best Breakthrough Performance
**Nick Cannon – Wild N Out**; Gayle King – CBS This Morning; Trevor Noah – The Daily Show; Nick Cannon – The Masked Singer; RuPaul – RuPaul's Drag Race	**Noah Centineo – To All the Boys I've Loved Before**; Awkwafina – Crazy Rich Asians; Ncuti Gatwa – Sex Education; Haley Lu Richardson – Five Feet Apart; MJ Rodriguez – Pose
Best Real Life Hero	Most Meme-able Moment
**Ruth Bader Ginsburg – RBG**; Alex Honnold – Free Solo; Hannah Gadsby – Nanette; Roman Reigns – WWE SmackDown; Serena Williams – Being Serena	**The Bachelor – Colton Underwood jumps the fence**; Lindsay Lohan's Beach Club – The Lilo Dance; Love & Hip Hop: Hollywood – Ray J's Hat; RBG – The Notorious RBG; RuPaul's Drag Race – Asia O'Hara's butterfly finale fail
Best Musical Moment
**"Shallow" – A Star Is Born**; Live Aid – Bohemian Rhapsody; "Just a Girl" – Captain Marvel; "Masquerade" – Chilling Adventures of Sabrina; "Look at That Butt" – On My Block; "Seventeen" – Riverdale; "Sunflower" – Spider-Man: Into the Spider-Verse; "I Think We're Alone Now" – The Umbrella Academy

- Note: † Jason Mitchell's nomination was rescinded on May 29, 2019 due to personal conduct issues.

=== MTV Generation Award ===
- Dwayne "The Rock" Johnson

=== MTV Trailblazer Award ===
- Jada Pinkett Smith

== Multiple nominations ==
=== Film ===
The following movies received multiple nominations:

- Four – Avengers: Endgame, RBG
- Three – Captain Marvel, To All the Boys I've Loved Before, Us
- Two – Bird Box, BlacKkKlansman, Bohemian Rhapsody, Crazy Rich Asians, Shazam!, Spider-Man: Into the Spider-Verse, A Star Is Born

=== Television ===
The following television series received multiple nominations:

- Four – Game of Thrones
- Three – Riverdale
- Two – The Bachelor, Big Mouth, Chilling Adventures of Sabrina, The Handmaid's Tale, The Haunting of Hill House, RuPaul's Drag Race, Schitt's Creek, Sex Education
