= Paradise (Bazzi song) =

Single by Bazzi

from the album Soul Searching
- Released: April 4, 2019
- Genre: Pop
- Length: 2:49
- Label: Atlantic
- Songwriter(s): Andrew Bazzi; Kevin White; Michael Woods
- Producer(s): Bazzi; Rice N' Peas

Bazzi singles chronology
"Caught in the Fire" (2019)	"Paradise" (2019)	"Focus" (2019)

"Paradise" is a song by American singer Bazzi, released as a single on April 4, 2019. The music video was released the same day. The song reached the top 50 in Australia and the top 40 in Norway. It is the lead single from his debut mixtape Soul Searching.

== Critical reception ==
Chloe Gilke of Uproxx called the song a "pop anthem" and "blissfully romantic". Madeline Roth of MTV said "Paradise" is a "fittingly euphoric anthem in the vein of his previous hits 'Mine' and 'Beautiful'".

== Music video ==
The music video was released on April 5, 2019. Shot in Mexico City and directed by Bon Duke, it features Bazzi singing as "couples of all genders and orientations lock lips in a dark room".

== Charts ==
Chart (2019)	Peak position
Australia (ARIA)	37
Belgium (Ultratip Bubbling Under Flanders)	25
Canada (Canadian Hot 100)	64
Czech Republic (Singles Digitál Top 100)	53
Hungary (Stream Top 40)	37
Ireland (IRMA)	29
Latvia (LAIPA)	17
Lithuania (AGATA)	14
New Zealand (Recorded Music NZ)	23
Norway (VG-lista)	38
Slovakia (Singles Digitál Top 100)	31
Sweden (Sverigetopplistan)	60
UK Singles (OCC)	64
US Billboard Hot 100	91
US Mainstream Top 40 (Billboard)	30
US Rolling Stone Top 100	46

== Certifications ==
Region	Certification	Certified units/sales
Australia (ARIA)	Platinum	70,000^{‡}
Brazil (Pro-Música Brasil)	Platinum	60,000^{‡}
Canada (Music Canada)	2× Platinum	160,000^{‡}
United Kingdom (BPI)	Silver	200,000^{‡}
United States (RIAA)	Platinum	1,000,000^{‡}
^{‡} Sales+streaming figures based on certification alone.
