= Salma Samar Damluji =

Iraqi British architect, professor and author (born 1954)

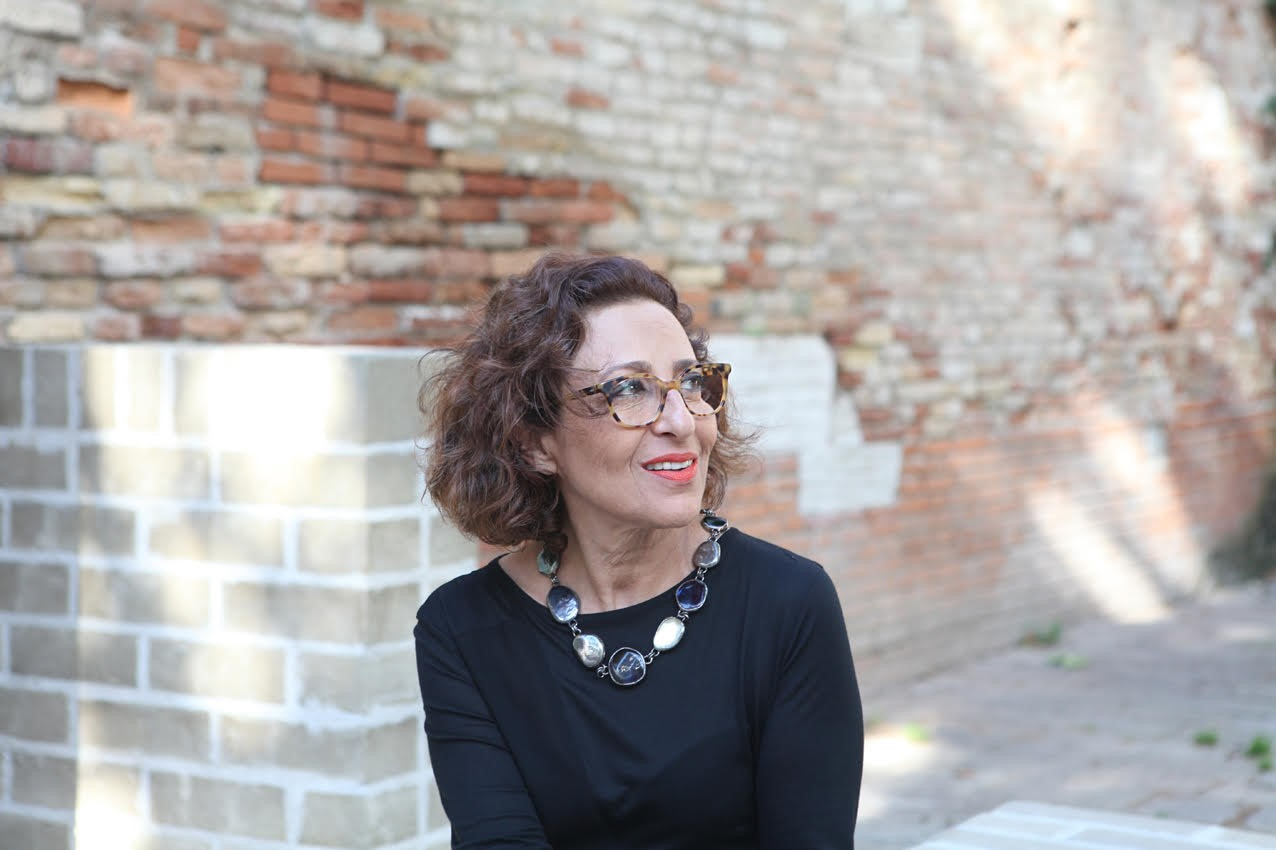
- Born: Beirut, Lebanon
- Occupation: Architect
- Awards: Médaille de la Restauration, French Academy of Architecture, 2015 (Paris) and Global Award for Sustainable Architecture 2012 (Paris), The Locus Foundation
- Projects: Masjid al Faqih in Aynat, Wadi Hadramut; Masna‘at ‘Urah and Qarn Majid in Wadi Daw‘an; Shaklanza Mosque in al Shihr, Hadramut Governorate, Yemen

Salma Samar Damluji (born 1954) is an Iraqi-British architect, professor and author based between London and Italy. She worked with the Egyptian architect Hassan Fathy in Cairo, in 1975-6 and in 1984–5. She was appointed architectural advisor to the UAE Shaykh Sultan bin Zayed Al Nahyan in 2001–2004 on the Sheikh Zayed Grand Mosque and other projects in Abu Dhabi. In 2008, she established the Daw'an Mud Brick Architecture Foundation in Hadramaut, with colleagues in Yemen and has been working there on earth construction and rehabilitation projects.

== Early life and education ==
Damluji was born in Beirut, Lebanon to an Iraqi father and a Lebanese mother. The family relocated to Baghdad in 1964. Damluji moved to London in 1972, where she went on to graduate from the AA School of Architecture in 1977. She later completed her doctorate at the Royal College of Art in 1987.

== Career ==
Damluji's involvement with the architecture of Yemen began after a working visit for the UNESCWA in 1981. Her projects there include, ‘Aynat Mosque: Masjid al Faqih (2008-11), Masna‘at ‘Urah, Daw‘an (2008-12), Husn Qarn Majid, Daw‘an (2012-14), ‘Umar Ba Wazir Mosque, Wadi Sah (2008-10) and more recently (2017-19) the post-war rehabilitation of the Shibam Gateway, and the reconstruction of al-Habib Hamad bin Salih Dome’ Bin Isma‘il Domes, Shaklanza Mosque in Al-Shihr and Shaykh Ya‘qub Dome in Mukalla. These projects were funded by the Prince Claus Fund of the Netherlands, the Cultural Emergency Response (CER) and the Cultural Protection Fund of the British Council, United Kingdom.. Additional projects include Diwan of the Governor of Hadramut, Mukalla (2020-2024) and the reconstruction of the Quayti Palace of Sultan Ali in Al Qatin, Wadi Hadramut (2022-2024).

In 2014, Damluji was the first woman architect invited to give the Leçon Inaugurale at the École de Chaillot in Paris, the tenth in the series. This was published in The Other Architecture: Geometry, Earth and the Vernacular, (Paris, 2015) and formed an overview of her work and research.

She was elected Member of the Académie d’Architecture in Paris in 2017, and awarded the Académie d’Architecture's Restoration Award (silver medal) in 2015. In 2012, she received The Global Award for Sustainable Architecture in 2012, from the Cité d'architecture & du Patrimoine and the Locus Foundation.

In 2013, she was appointed to the Mu‘allim Awad Binaldin Chair for Professor of Architecture in the Islamic World, at the American University of Beirut. Damluji was a senior tutor at the Architectural Association (AA) Graduate School and at the Royal College of Art (RCA) in London (UK). She has several titles published on earth and vernacular architecture of the Arab region. Her publications include Hassan Fathy: Earth & Utopia (2018), The Architecture of Yemen (2007) and The Architecture of Oman (1998). A new edition of The Architecture of Yemen and its Reconstruction( published in 2021. She has curated exhibitions on her work in London (at the RCA and RIBA), in Paris, Venice and Madrid.

== Publications ==
=== Books ===
- The Architecture of Yemen and Its Reconstruction, Laurence King Publishing, London 2021
- Hassan Fathy: Earth & Utopia, (Laurence King Publishing, London 2018)
- The Other Architecture: Geometry, Earth and Vernacular (Leçon Inaugurale de l’École de Chaillot), Paris 2015, French and English. (Short listed by the Académie d’Architecture for the Prix du Livre d’Architecture in November 2015)
- Al Diwan Al Amiri, Doha, Qatar, Laurence King Publishing, London 2013
- Earth Architecture, Architectural Landmarks Wadi Hadramut & Daw‘an, Earth Architecture Conference Say’un- February 2011, Beirut 2011
- Editor. The Sheikh Zayed Al Nahayan Mosque Abu Dhabi: Italian Excellence in The UAE, Fantini Mosaici, Milano 2009
- The Architecture of Yemen From Yafi’ to Hadramut, Laurence King Publishing, London 2007
- The Sultan Qaboos Grand Mosque, Apex Publishing, Muscat 2007
- The Architecture of the UAE, Garnet Publishing, Reading 2006
- The Architecture of Oman, Reading 1998
- Editor. The Architecture of the Prophet's Holy Mosque Madinah, London 1998
- Editor. The Architecture of the Holy Mosque Makkah, London 1998
- Zillij The Art of Moroccan Ceramics, with John Hedgecoe; Reading 1992 (French Edition 1993)
- General Editor, Islamic Art and Architecture, The System of Geometric Design Issam El Said; Tarek El Bouri & Keith Critchlow, Reading 1993
- The Valley of Mud Brick Architecture Shibam, Tarim and Wadi Hadramut, Reading 1992 (Arabic Edition, Beirut 1996)
- A Yemen Reality; Architecture Sculptured in Mud and Stone, Reading 1991
- Editor. The Visual Diary of an Arab Architect, Maath Alousi, Beirut & London 1983

=== Book chapters ===
- http://www.gallimard.fr/Catalogue/GALLIMARD/Alternatives/Architecture-Alternatives/Sustainable-design-8 ‘Ammar Khammash Portrait' in Sustainable Design 8: Towards a new Ethics for Architecture and the City, Contal, Marie-Hélène and Revedin, Jana, Architecture - Alternatives Gallimard Editions, Paris, 2020 (pp.124-131).
- ‘A Mosque & Saint Domes in Wadi Sah: Hadramut (YEMEN)’, in earth construction & tradition vol 2 Ed. Hubert Feiglstorfer, IVA-ICRA (Institute for Comparative Research on Architecture) Vienna University of Technology, Vienna, 2018 (pp. 313–337).
- ‘Re-inventing M‘alula’ in Wave 2017 | Syria (Syria the Making of the Future + 26 workshops), Incipit (Italy), 2017
- ‘La Médina et le renouveau de la ville nomade [The Medina and nomad urban renewal]’, in La Ville Rebelle, Ed. Jana Revedin, Paris, 2015
- "Salma Samar Damluji"’ in Sustainable Design III, vers une nouvelle ´ethique pour l’architecture et la ville, Contal, Marie-Hélène and Revedin, Jana, Paris, 2014 (pp.82-95).

=== Articles ===
- Alef Magazine Issue 6 pp.70-73, 2008
- Earth Wear: Mud Cities in Hadramut, Yemen, The Architectural Review, February 2020
- Hassan Fathy, de la vérité en Architecture; Hassan Fathy, About Truth in Architecture, Engagements, L’Architecture d’Aujourd’hui, ‘A’A 424, September 2018
- Les Architectures de Terre de Salma Samar Damluji; Salma Samar Damluji’s Earth Architecture, Générosités, espaces en plus, L’Architecture d’Aujourd’hui, ‘A’A 426, May 2018

=== Exhibitions ===
- Iuav Architecture University of Venice Wave exhibition on Ma‘lula: ‘Construction of life size dome for Ma‘lula, models of the destroyed convents, and city’, Venice, June- July 2017
- AA XX 100 Women in Architecture in Context 1917–2017, Architectural Association, London, 7 October-9 December 2017
- Iuav Architecture University of Venice ‘Sketch for Syria’, art works, January–February 2017
- Re-Enchant the World, group exhibition of the Cité de l’Architecture et du Patrimoine, Palais du Chaillot, Paris, May–October 2014
- Consultant to the Louisiana Museum of Modern Art, Denmark for the exhibition ‘Arab Contemporary: Architecture, Culture and Identity’, Denmark, January- May 2014
- ‘ARABIA FELIX: The Architecture of Yemen’, RIBA London, November 2007- February 2008

=== Reviews ===
- Casabella, May 2020 ‘Hassan Fathy’ by Francesco Dal Co
- November–December 2019: New Left Review ‘A Mud-Brick Utopia’ by Owen Hatherley
- November 2018: Financial Times ‘Best books of 2018: Architecture and design’ by Edwin Heathcote
- 8 November 2018: Corriere della Sera ‘Hassan Fathy: l’utopia continua’ by Testo Massimo di Conto
- October 2018 Wallpaper magazine ‘The first book on the philosophy and work of Hassan Fathy’ by Harriet Thorpe
- October 2018 Architectural Digest Middle East ‘Book Review: Hassan Fathy’s tale of Earth & Utopia’ by Jumana Abdel-Razzaq

=== Awards ===
- Médaille de la Restauration, French Academy of Architecture, Silver Medal of The French Academy of Architecture 2015 (Paris)
- Global Award for Sustainable Architecture 2012 (Paris), The Locus Foundation

=== Video features ===
- Cool Mud Beats Concrete for Building Homes in a Hotter Africa, 2 November 2022
- Daw‘an Mud Brick Architecture Foundation: Twelve years of work
- ‘Retelling History …’, New Canonical Histories series, London, UK, January 2019
- W.A.Ve. 2018 Italian Beauty: the video of the award ceremony
- Salma Samar Damluji, Daw‘an Architecture Foundation, Entrevue diffusée dans l'exposition "Réenchanter le monde: architecture, ville, transitions" présentée à la Cité de l'architecture et du patrimoine du mercredi 21 mai 2014 au lundi 6 octobre 2014
- Earth Earth, with Roger Moukarzel, for Re-enchant the World Exhibition, Cité de l’Architecture & du Patrimoine, 2014
- Leçon Inaugurale de l’école de Chaillot, Cité de l’Architecture et du Patrimoine, 3 March 2014
- Sun Dust: Shibam with Roger Moukarzel, 2013

== Daw‘an Mud Brick Architecture Foundation ==
Daw‘an Mud Brick Architecture Foundation was established in 2007-8, by Salma Samar Damluji and her colleagues in Yemen, Dr. Abdullah BaGhumyan and Architect Ali Ba Saad. The foundation sets up projects and funding to design and construct with Hadrami builders using earth materials and techniques of Yemeni earth architecture.

She resigned in 2024 and is Trustee of Earth Architecture Lab https://www.eartharchlab.org, UK registered charity, with Peter Murray, OBE and Graham Modlen.

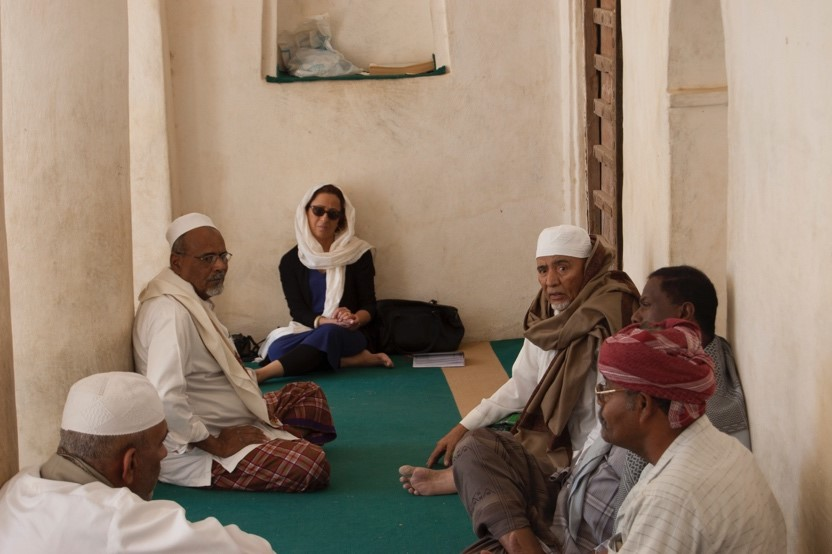
Meeting at Masjid al Faqih with (left to right): Keeper of the Mosque, Sayyid Abu Bakr al-Hamid, Salma Samar Damluji, Mansab ‘Aynat ‘Umar al-Hamid, ‘Umar BaSa‘d (our driver) and Karamah ‘Ubayd ‘Ulaywah. ©Daw‘an Mud Brick Architecture Foundation, 2012

=== Projects completed ===
- Masna‘at ‘Urah Location: Wadi Daw‘an Date: 2006 – 2013
- ‘Aynat Mosque: Masjid al Faqih Location: ‘Aynat- Wadi Hadramut Date: 2008 – 2011
- ‘Umar Ba Wazir Mosque Location: Ghayl ‘Umar- Sah, Wadi Hadramut Date: 2008 – 2010

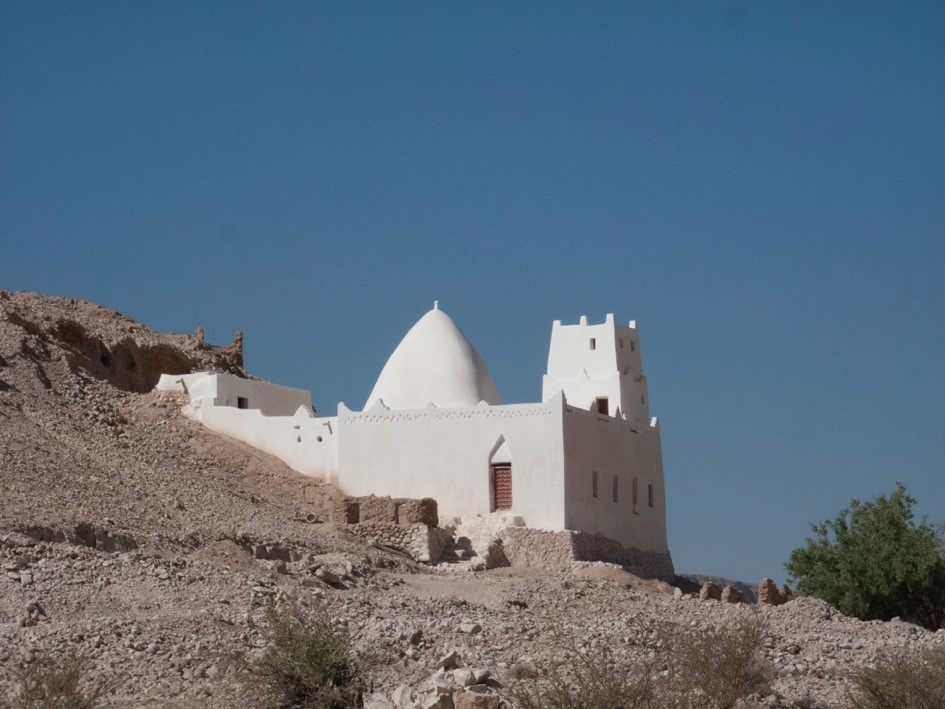
‘Umar Ba Wazir Mosque ©Daw‘an Mud Brick Architecture, 2010

- Wali Domes (Saint Shrines) Location: Sah, Wadi Hadramut Date: 2008 – 2010
- Husn Qarn Majid Location: Wadi Daw‘an Date: 2012 – 2014
- Shibam’s Housing The BaSahi House - The BaSwatayn House Location: Shibam, Wadi Hadramut Date: 2012 – 2014
- Post-War Shibam Shibam Gateway Shibam Palace Entrance Location: Shibam, Wadi Hadramut Date: 2017 – 2019
- A grant was approved by the British Council, Cultural Protection Fund (CPF), for a project on ‘Post-war Reconstruction and Rehabilitation in Yemen’, directed by the CER-Net Prince Claus Fund. The Daw‘an Architecture Foundation was contracted to manage and implement the project in partnership with the Office of the Governor of Hadramut. The project concerns reconstructing cultural sites and landmarks in Hadramut that have been targeted in the war:

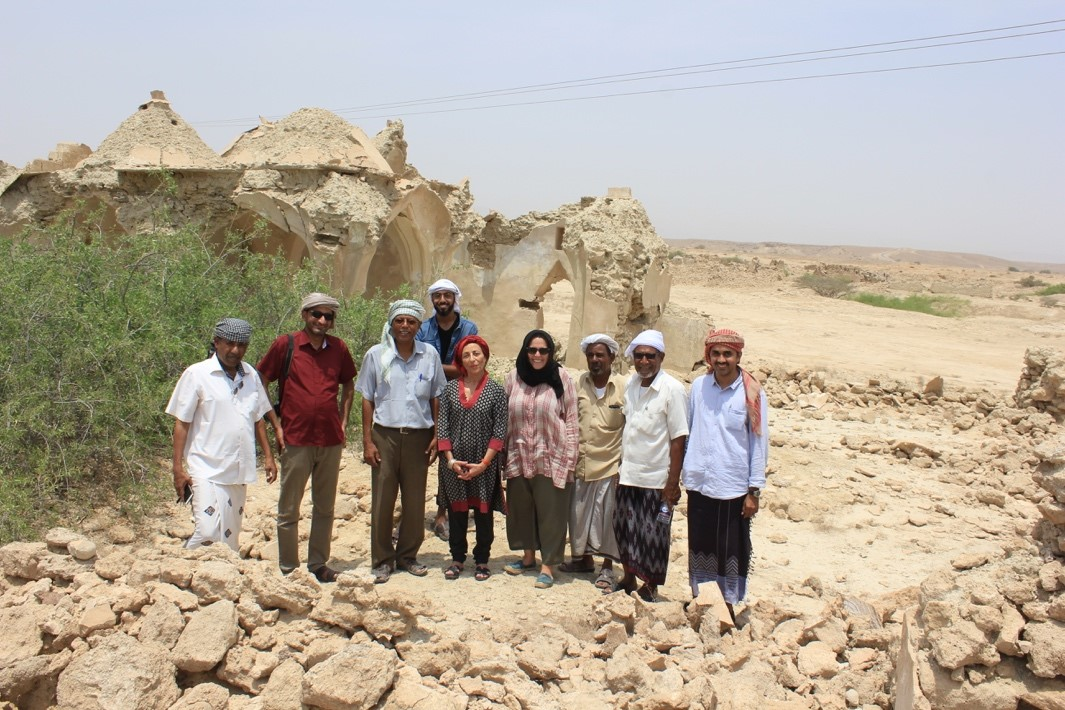
Daw‘an Mud Brick Architecture team at the Shaklanza Mosque ©Daw‘an Mud Brick Architecture, 2019

- Shaykh Ya‘qub Dome Location: Al Mukallah, Hadramut Date: 2019 – 2020
- Diwan of the Governor of Hadramut Location: Al Mukallah, Hadramut Date: 2020-2021 & 2022-2024

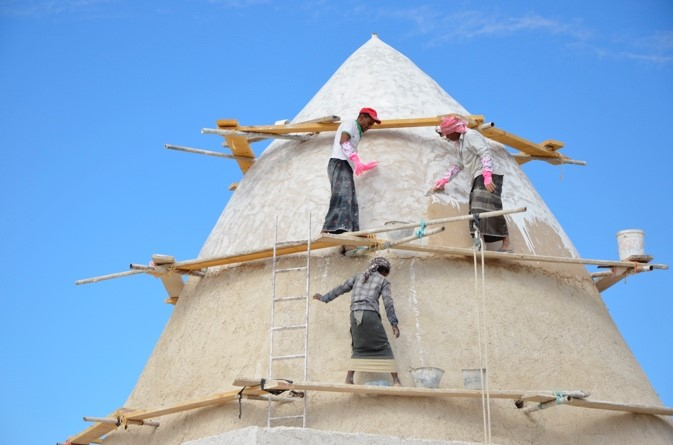
Al Habib Hamad Bin Salih Domes ©Daw‘an Mud Brick Architecture, 2019

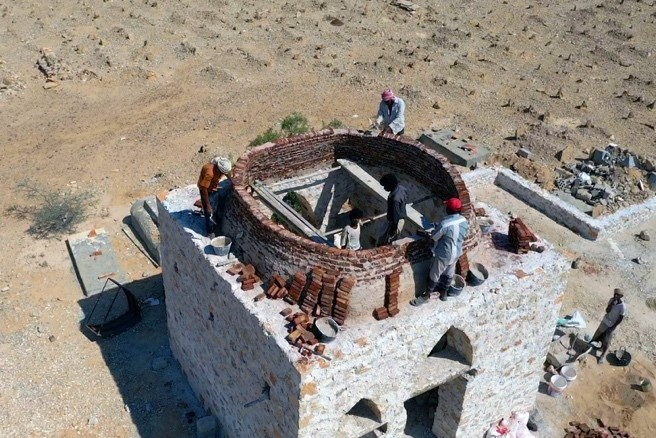
Al Habib Hamad Bin Salih Domes ©Daw‘an Mud Brick Architecture, 2019

- Shaklanza Mosque Location: Al Shihr, Hadramut Date: 2019 – 2020
- Al Habib Hamad Bin Salih Domes Location: Al Shihr, Hadramut Date: 2019 – 2020
- Bin Isma‘il Domes Location: Al Shihr, Hadramut Date: 2019 – 2020
