= Focal =

Focal or FOCAL may refer to:

- Focal (lexicographical website), an Irish lexicographical website
- FOCAL (programming language), a programming language for the PDP-8 and similar machines
- Focal (HP-41), for programming HP calculators
- FOCAL (spacecraft), a proposed space telescope
- FOCAL International, a trade body representing the film archive industry
- Focal-JMLab, a French manufacturer of audio equipment
- Focal Radio, a radio station based in Stoke-on-Trent, England
- Focal neurologic signs
- Focal Fossa, version 20.04 of the Ubuntu operating system

== See also ==
- Focal point (disambiguation)
- Focus (disambiguation)
