= Focus (name) =

Focus is a given name and a surname. Notable people with the name include:

- Focus Gwede (died 2011), head of Malawi Police Force
- Focus Jirakul (born 1993), Thai actress
- Georges Focus, 17th century French engraver and painter
