= Cosmic (album) =

Studio album by Bazzi
- Released: April 12, 2018
- Genres: Pop; R&B
- Length: 42:04
- Labels: iamcosmic; Atlantic
- Producers: Andrew Bazzi; Rice N' Peas

Bazzi chronology
Cosmic (2018)	Soul Searching (2019)

Singles from Cosmic
- 1. "Beautiful" Released: July 2, 2017; 2. "Mine" Released: October 12, 2017; 3. "Why?" Released: January 25, 2018; 4. "Gone" Released: February 20, 2018; 5. "Honest" Released: March 22, 2018

Cosmic (stylized in all caps as COSMIC) is the debut studio album by American singer-songwriter Bazzi, released on April 12, 2018 through Bazzi's imprint, iamcosmic, and Atlantic.

The album has peaked at number 14 on the US Billboard 200 chart and has been listed on a variety of international charts. The album was further affected by the commercial success of "Mine", which peaked at number 11 on the Billboard Hot 100.

== Background ==
Bazzi released several tracks in 2016 and 2017, including "Alone", "Beautiful", and "Sober." In October 2017, he released "Mine" via Atlantic Records. That song increased in popularity after it was used as a Snapchat lens filter in January 2018. It peaked at number 11 on the Billboard Hot 100 chart. On March 22, 2018, Bazzi announced the release date for his debut album as April 12. This came after the release of three more singles, "Why?", "Gone", and "Honest". On August 2, 2018, he released a remix of "Beautiful" featuring Cuban-American singer Camila Cabello.

== Commercial performance ==
Cosmic debuted at number 35 in on the US Billboard 200 selling 15,000 album-equivalent units. It has since peaked at number 14 on the list. It has also charted on a variety of international charts including at number 65 in the United Kingdom, number 13 in Canada, and number 14 in Denmark.

== Track listing ==
All tracks written by Andrew Bazzi, except where noted. All tracks produced by Rice N' Peas and Bazzi, except where noted. Credits adapted from Tidal and Genius.

No.	Title	Writer(s)	Producer(s)	Length
1.	"Dreams"	Andrew Bazzi; James LaVigne		2:27
2.	"Soarin"	Bazzi; LaVigne	Rice N' Peas; Bazzi; Dallas Caton	2:57
3.	"Myself"	Bazzi; LaVigne		2:47
4.	"Star"	Bazzi; Madison Love	Rice N' Peas; Bazzi; Thomas Eriksen	2:49
5.	"Why?"			2:28
6.	"3:15"			2:47
7.	"Honest"	Bazzi; LaVigne		2:55
8.	"Mirror"	Bazzi; Van Morrison		2:20
9.	"Gone"			2:12
10.	"Fantasy"			2:28
11.	"BRB"			2:40
12.	"Cartier"			2:52
13.	"Beautiful"			2:58
14.	"Mine"			2:11
15.	"Changed"			2:23
16.	"Somebody"	Bazzi; LaVigne		2:50
Total length:				42:11

Notes

- "Mirror" contains an interpolation of "Crazy Love" by Van Morrison.

== Charts ==
=== Weekly charts ===
Chart (2018)	Peak position
Australian Albums (ARIA)	41
Belgian Albums (Ultratop Flanders)	99
Canadian Albums (Billboard)	13
Danish Albums (Hitlisten)	14
Dutch Albums (Album Top 100)	43
Finnish Albums (Suomen virallinen lista)	19
Irish Albums (IRMA)	47
New Zealand Albums (RMNZ)	19
Norwegian Albums (VG-lista)	16
Swedish Albums (Sverigetopplistan)	27
UK Albums (OCC)	65
US Billboard 200	14

=== Year-end charts ===
Chart (2018)	Position
US Billboard 200	69

Chart (2019)	Position
New Zealand Albums (RMNZ)	49
US Billboard 200	62

== Certifications ==
Region	Certification	Certified units/sales
Brazil (Pro-Música Brasil)	Gold	20,000^{‡}
Canada (Music Canada)	Platinum	80,000^{‡}
Denmark (IFPI Danmark)	Platinum	20,000^{‡}
New Zealand (RMNZ)	Platinum	15,000^{‡}
Norway (IFPI Norway)	Gold	10,000^{‡}
Singapore (RIAS)	Platinum	10,000^{*}
United Kingdom (BPI)	Gold	100,000^{‡}
United States (RIAA)	Platinum	1,000,000^{‡}
^{*} Sales figures based on certification alone.^{‡} Sales+streaming figures based on certification alone.
