= Focal point =

Focal point may refer to:

- Focus (optics)
- Focus (geometry)
- Conjugate points, also called focal points
- Focal point (game theory)
- Unicom Focal Point, a portfolio management software tool
- Focal point review, a human resources process for employee evaluation
- Focal Point (album), a 1976 studio album by McCoy Tyner
- "Focal Point: Mark of the Leaf", a Naruto episode

== See also ==
- Foca Point, Signy Island, South Orkney Islands
- Focal (disambiguation)
- Focus (disambiguation)
