= Soul Searching (mixtape) =

Mixtape by Bazzi
- Released: August 9, 2019
- Genres: Pop; R&B
- Length: 28:23
- Labels: iamcosmic; Atlantic
- Producers: Andrew Bazzi; Rice N Peas

Bazzi chronology
| Cosmic (2018) | Soul Searching (2019) | Infinite Dream (2022) |

Singles from Soul Searching
- 1. "Paradise" Released: April 4, 2019; 2. "Focus" Released: June 13, 2019; 3. "I.F.L.Y." Released: July 8, 2019

Soul Searching is the debut mixtape by an American singer-songwriter Bazzi, released through Bazzi's imprint, iamcosmic, and Atlantic on August 9, 2019. It was preceded by the singles "Paradise", "Focus" and "I.F.L.Y.". It is a follow-up to his 2018 release Cosmic (2018).

== Background ==
Bazzi called the mixtape a "journey of love, pain and growth" and said his intention was to "make a record that felt like summer and make people want to put their windows down and just enjoy it". Prior to its release, Bazzi said he wanted to release more music to his fans and "continue to build a connection with people". According to Bazzi in an interview with Billboard, the mixtape is his most personal work to date.

== Track listing ==
Credits adapted from Spotify.

| No. | Title | Writer(s) | Length |
|---|---|---|---|
| 1. | "Humble Beginnings" | Andrew Bazzi; Kevin White; Michael Woods | 3:04 |
| 2. | "Soul Searching" | Bazzi; JaVale McGee; White; Woods | 2:28 |
| 3. | "No Way!" | Bazzi; White; Woods | 1:52 |
| 4. | "Fallin" (featuring 6lack) | Bazzi; Ricardo Valentine, Jr.; White; Woods | 2:30 |
| 5. | "Can We Go Back to Bed?" | Bazzi; White; Woods | 2:57 |
| 6. | "Live Forever" | Bazzi; White; Christopher Comstock; Woods | 2:32 |
| 7. | "I.F.L.Y." | Bazzi; White; Woods | 2:46 |
| 8. | "Focus" (featuring 21 Savage) | Bazzi; Shéyaa Bin Abraham-Joseph; David Guy; White; Leon Michels; Woods; Thomas Brenneck | 2:35 |
| 9. | "Paradise" | Bazzi; White; Woods | 2:49 |
| 10. | "Conversations with Myself" | Bazzi; White; Woods | 1:59 |
| 11. | "Who Am I?" | Bazzi; White; Woods | 2:51 |
| Total length: | | | 28:23 |

== Charts ==
| Chart (2019) | Peak position |
|---|---|
| Australian Albums (ARIA) | 25 |
| Belgian Albums (Ultratop Flanders) | 147 |
| Canadian Albums (Billboard) | 18 |
| Dutch Albums (Album Top 100) | 73 |
| Finnish Albums (Suomen virallinen lista) | 47 |
| Irish Albums (IRMA) | 63 |
| Latvian Albums (LAIPA) | 10 |
| Lithuanian Albums (AGATA) | 4 |
| New Zealand Albums (RMNZ) | 18 |
| Norwegian Albums (VG-lista) | 11 |
| Swedish Albums (Sverigetopplistan) | 42 |
| US Billboard 200 | 20 |

== Certifications ==
| Region | Certification | Certified units/sales |
|---|---|---|
| Canada (Music Canada) | Gold | 40,000^{‡} |
^{‡} Sales+streaming figures based on certification alone.
