= I.F.L.Y. =

Single by Bazzi

from the album Soul Searching
- Released: July 8, 2019
- Length: 2:46
- Label: Atlantic
- Songwriters: Bazzi, Michael Woods
- Producers: Bazzi; Rice N' Peas

Bazzi singles chronology
"Focus" (2019)	"I.F.L.Y." (2019)	"Young & Alive" (2020)

"I.F.L.Y." (I Fucking Love You) is a song by American singer Bazzi, released as a single on July 8, 2019 as the third and final single from his debut mixtape Soul Searching. The song reached the top 50 in Australia and New Zealand.

== Charts ==
Chart (2019)	Peak position
Australia (ARIA)	41
Canada (Canadian Hot 100)	85
Ireland (IRMA)	75
New Zealand (Recorded Music NZ)	28
US Rolling Stone Top 100	61

== Certifications ==
Region	Certification	Certified units/sales
Australia (ARIA)	Platinum	70,000^{‡}
Brazil (Pro-Música Brasil)	Platinum	40,000^{‡}
Canada (Music Canada)	Platinum	80,000^{‡}
Portugal (AFP)	Gold	5,000^{‡}
United States (RIAA)	Platinum	1,000,000^{‡}
^{‡} Sales+streaming figures based on certification alone.
