= Focusing =

Focusing may refer to:

- Adjusting an optical system to minimize defocus aberration
- Focusing (psychotherapy), a psychotherapeutic technique

== See also ==
- Focus (optics)
- Focus (disambiguation)
