= Georges Focus =

French painter, 1641-1708

- Born: 1641; Châteaudun
- Died: 26 February 1708 (aged 66–67); Paris
- Occupation: Etcher, painter

Georges Focus was a French engraver and painter who was born around 1639–1641 in Châteaudun and died on February 26 (or 27) 1708 in Paris. André Félibien calls him "Georges Faucus". He was a member of the Académie royale de peinture et de sculpture, close to Charles Le Brun and Girard Audran. He is famous for the drawings he made while suffering from psychiatric troubles.

== Family background ==
Focus's family seems to have been moderately rich; his father owned a wool and twill shop in Paris.

== Education ==
Around the age of 15, Focus became an apprentice of Louis Elle. It is possible that he also received lessons from Israel Silvestre.

== Stay in Rome ==
Georges Focus is one of the first young artists sent to Rome by Charles Errard: he lived in this city from 1666 to 1669. He first lived in the parish of San Lorenzo in Lucina, together with many other French artists, then in the parish of Santo Spirito in Sassia, at the same address as Gerard Audran, Thomas de Saint Vincent, Etienne Aubry and Marc Nattier.

== Member of the Académie royale de peinture et de sculpture ==
On June 28, 1675, Focus handed over his admission painting and then swore an oath as a member of the Académie royale de peinture et de sculpture. His admission piece, a landscape painting, was still preserved at the time of the French Revolution, but it was considered lost in 1910. Focus actively participated in the life of the Academy until 1681, and his name still appears in registers in 1683.

In 1679, he painted sixteen small landscape paintings for the apartments of the Dukes of Chevreuse and Beauvilliers in the Palace of Versailles, and received 480 livres for his work. They may have been overdoors, and are now considered lost.

The catalog of Focus engraved work was established first by Robert-Dumesnil (1836), then by Weigert as part of the effort to organize the French prints' department at the National French Library (1961). Only eight pieces are known, including a series of six prints representing Roman landscapes, dedicated to Charles Le Brun and published by Girard Audran in 1678.

Drawings by Focus have also been preserved, be they preparatory to his prints (School of Fine Arts, Besançon Museum) or independent from them (Louvre Museum). A much freer style drawing is kept in the Chicago Art Institute.

== Madness and internment ==
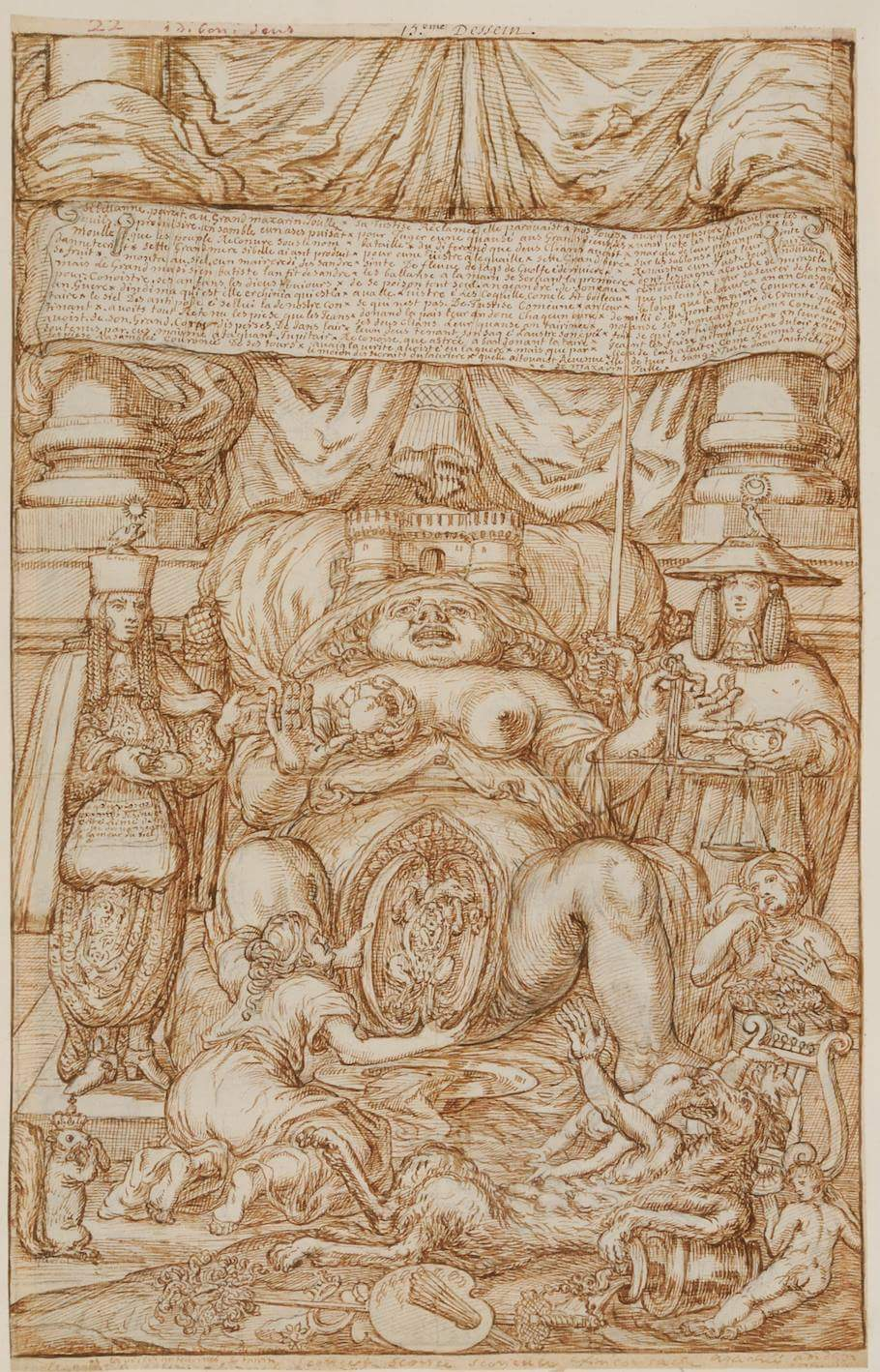
Drawing made by Focus in Les petites maisons.

After he became mad, Focus was hospitalized in the asylum of "Petites maisons". There he drew around 1694 several dozens of drawings affected by his mental troubles. He seemed to take himself for the king of France or the Pope, believed to be persecuted by the Academy's members, or threatened by the Beast of Gâtinais, a famous feral wolf. His drawings include cartouches filled with texts containing numerous anecdotes about his life, his associates and his contemporaries. These drawings might have been saved by close relatives of Focus, and they have been preserved until the 21st century because of their artistic quality

His contemporaries would probably have characterized Focus' mental state as "mania"; Bernard Granger, professor of psychiatry at René Descartes University, proposes, with all due caution, the retrospective diagnosis of schizo-affective disorder.

== Death and posterity ==
According to Mariette, who wrote half a century after his death, Focus died at the Petites Maisons on February 27, 1708 (February 26, according to the list of academicians).

His work falls into oblivion until the end of the 20th century. A box kept since 1780 in a private family archive that contains a set of sheets signed by Focus was rediscovered in Paris in 2010. An exhibition at the Palais des Beaux Arts in Paris, in 2018, allowed for a fresh look on the "written drawings" of this crazy artist from the seventeenth century.

== Style ==
Focus' prints are landscapes in an Italian style close to that of Gaspard Dughet, Francisque Millet or Étienne Allegrain. His drawings are similar to those by artists of outsider art, like Wolfli or Aloïse Corbaz.

== Bibliography ==
- Auguste Jal, Dictionnaire critique de biographie et d'histoire. Errata et supplément pour tous les dictionnaires historiques d'après des documents authentiques inédits, Henri Plon imprimeur-éditeur, Paris, 1867, p. 585
- Pierre-Jean Mariette, https://gallica.bnf.fr/ark:/12148/bpt6k2022419/f239.item.r= Abecedario de P. J. Mariette], J.-B. Dumoulin, Paris, 1853-1854, tome 2, COL-ISAC, p. 235, 251
- Emmanuelle Brugerolles, ed. (2018). Georges Focus. La Folie d'un peintre de Louis XIV. Paris: Beaux-Arts de Paris éditions. p. 400. ISBN 978-2-8405-6544-4.
