= Focused =

Focused may refer to:

- Focused (band), a Christian hardcore band
- Focused (album), a 1999 album by Billy Cobham
- "Focused" (song), a song by Wale
- "Focused", a song by Snoop Dogg from the album I Wanna Thank Me
