= The Focus Group (business) =

Defunct British branded clothing company

- Company type: Private company
- Industry: Sports wear
- Founded: 1976
- Founders: Michael and David Gilbert
- Defunct: 2007
- Fate: Acquired
- Successor: JD Sports
- Headquarters: St. Albans, United Kingdom
- Area served: United Kingdom
- Key people: Michael Gilbert, David Gilbert, David Tolman, Mark Schaffer and Trevor Freeman
- Owner: JD Sports (49%)

The Focus Group was a British company that designed, sourced and distributed branded and own brand footwear, apparel and accessories. It was founded in 1976 and was acquired by JD Sports in 2007.

It held a number of third party licences and also designed and sourced product from a number of sports and fashion retailers.

== History ==
The company was founded in 1976 and became one of the leading companies in the UK for the design, sourcing and distribution of branded and own brand footwear, apparel and accessories.

In May 2007, Manchester City Football Club agreed a deal with the group that saw the club kitted out by French manufacturers Le Coq Sportif. In May 2009, Everton Football Club followed suit.

The company was acquired in December 2007 by JD Sports which took a 49% stake in the holding company.

== Third Party Licenses ==
- (United States) Eckō Unltd.
- (France) Le Coq Sportif
- (Italy) Sergio Tacchini
