= Fantasy Focus =

Fantasy Focus may refer to:

- Fantasy Focus (podcast), a sports talk podcast
- Fantasy Focus (XM radio program), a show focused on fantasy baseball
