= Bazzi (singer) =

American singer-songwriter

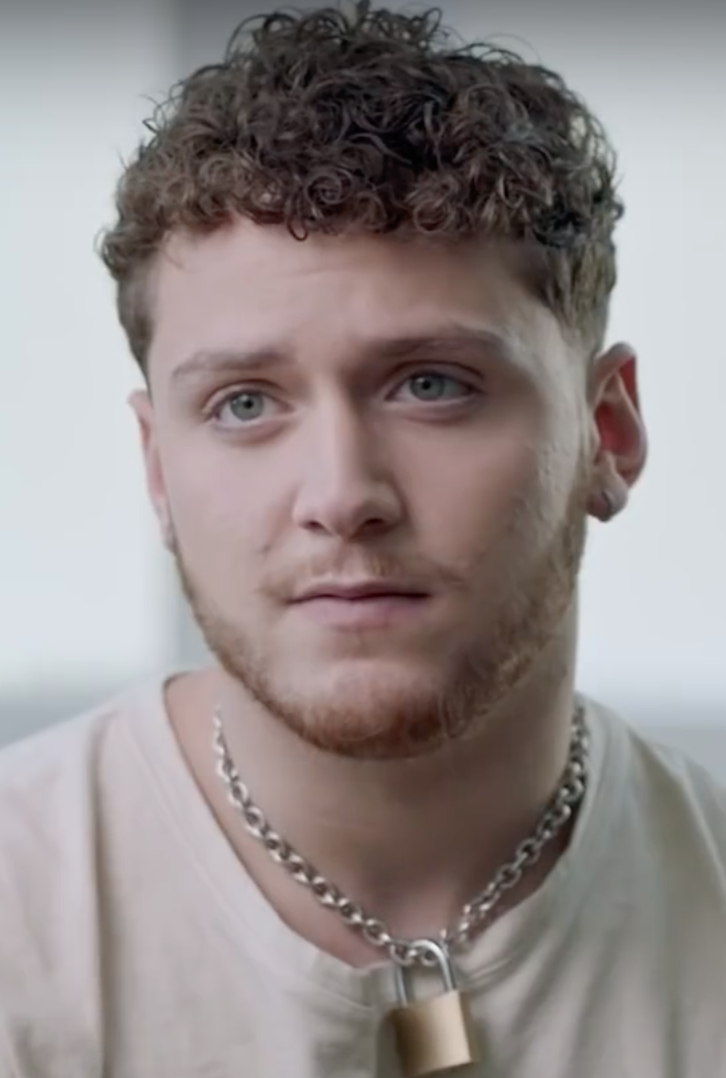
- Bazzi in 2019

Background information
- Born: Andrew Bazzi; August 28, 1997 (age 28); Canton, Michigan, U.S.
- Origin: Dearborn, Michigan, U.S.
- Genres: Pop; R&B
- Occupations: Singer; songwriter; record producer
- Instruments: Vocals; guitar; piano
- Years active: 2013–present
- Labels: iamcosmic; Atlantic; ZZZ
- Website: bazziofficial.com

Andrew Bazzi (/ˈbɑːzi/; BAH-zee born August 28, 1997), known mononymously by his surname Bazzi, is an American singer-songwriter. His song "Mine", released in October 2017, gained popularity in early 2018 when it became a meme through Musical.ly edits, and the use of a Snapchat lens filter featuring the song. It peaked at number 11 on the US Billboard Hot 100, and appeared on several international charts. He released his debut studio album Cosmic in 2018, which peaked at number 14 on the Billboard 200 chart.

== Early life and education ==
Bazzi was born in Canton, Michigan. His mother is American and his father is a Lebanese immigrant. He has lived in Beirut and has Lebanese nationality. He grew up in Dearborn, Michigan. He learned to speak Arabic and played the kazoo, oud, and guitar as a child. In 2012, he began posting covers of songs on his YouTube channel. He attended Plymouth-Canton Educational Park. In November 2014, he moved to the Los Angeles area to pursue a music career. He finished high school at Santa Monica High School in 2015.

== Career ==
Bazzi created a Vine account in July 2013. By 2015, he had accrued 1.5 million followers on the site. In September of that year, he became the first artist to release a Vine "Featured Track" which was entitled, "Bring You Home". In 2016, he was featured on the Fancy Cars' track "Fun". Over the course of the next two years, Bazzi released several singles including "Alone" "Beautiful", "Got Friends", and "Sober". Bazzi has cited artists Justin Timberlake, Bryson Tiller, Duran Duran, Michael Jackson and Guns N' Roses among his influences.

In October 2017, he released the single "Mine". Within days of its release, an A&R executive at Warner Music-affiliated Artist Partner Group had signed him to a deal including his songwriter Henry Fredrickson from Minnesota. The song increased in popularity after becoming an Internet meme, through videos featuring a slideshow of different pictures of the subject of the video with the Snapchat "hearts" filter and overlaying lyrics. In January 2018, the song appeared on the Billboard Hot 100, debuting at number 56. As of April 2018, the song's peak on the list was number 11. Bazzi also released three new singles in 2018, "Why?", "Gone" and "Honest". On March 13, 2018, Bazzi was announced as the special guest on Camila Cabello's Never Be the Same Tour's North American leg. On April 17, 2018, Cosmic debuted at number 35 and later peaked at number 14 on the US Billboard 200 albums chart. Bazzi joined Justin Timberlake's Man of the Woods Tour as the opening act for the European leg. He received a nomination for an MTV Video Music Award for Best New Artist. Bazzi collaborated with Camila Cabello on a remix of the song "Beautiful", which was released on August 2, 2018. Bazzi performed "Beautiful" on a float in the 2018 Macy's Thanksgiving Day Parade.

Bazzi worked with K-pop entertainment company SM Entertainment to co-write songs for two of their boy bands, EXO and NCT Dream. With NCT Dream, he co-wrote "We Go Up" with their member Mark for the EP, We Go Up. With EXO, he co-wrote "The Eve" for the studio album The War, and "Ooh La La La" and "Oasis" for the studio album Don’t Mess Up My Tempo. He additionally co-wrote the song "Love Shot" for the repackaged version of Don't Mess Up My Tempo, Love Shot. He also co-wrote song "Give Me a Chance" with Chinese singer and Exo member Lay Zhang for his studio album Namanana.

In April 2019, Bazzi released "Caught in the Fire" and "Paradise". On August 8, 2019, he released his debut mixtape Soul Searching, which includes the song "Paradise", as well as "Focus" (featuring 21 Savage) and "I.F.L.Y.".

In 2020 Bazzi released the singles "Young & Alive", "Renee's Song", "I Got You", "I Don't Think I'm Okay", and "Crazy".

In a Billboard interview in 2018, Bazzi mentioned that he did not have any other job experiences before his music career.

On September 16, 2022, Bazzi released the long-awaited album Infinite Dreams. Marking his first album in 4 years since Cosmic. The album includes a total of 19 tracks. Bazzi announced his upcoming Infinite Dream Tour following the release of his album. The tour stopped in sixteen cities.

== Personal life ==
Bazzi lives in Los Angeles. He has talked openly about his struggles with mental health and substance abuse while quarantining during the COVID-19 pandemic. In an open letter on Twitter, he stated that he "let a drug problem get out of hand, I've been drinking my boredom away." He dated Renee Herbert.

== Discography ==
=== Studio albums ===
Title	Details	Peak chart positions										Certifications
Title	Details	US	AUS	BEL (FL)	CAN	DEN	IRE	NL	NZ	SWE	UK	Certifications
Cosmic	Released: April 12, 2018; Label: Atlantic; Formats: LP, CD, digital download, streaming	14	41	99	13	14	47	43	19	27	65	RIAA: Platinum; BPI: Gold; IFPI DEN: Gold; MC: Platinum; RMNZ: Platinum
Infinite Dream	Released: September 16, 2022; Label: Atlantic; Formats: CD, digital download, streaming	—	—	—	—	—	—	—	—	—	—	
"—" denotes items which were not released in that country or failed to chart.

=== Mixtapes ===
Title	Details	Peak chart positions									Certifications
Title	Details	US	AUS	BEL (FL)	CAN	IRE	NL	NOR	NZ	SWE	Certifications
Soul Searching	Released: August 8, 2019; Label: Atlantic; Formats: Digital download, streaming	20	25	147	18	63	73	11	18	42	MC: Gold

=== Singles as lead artist ===
Title	Year	Peak chart positions										Certifications	Album
Title	Year	US	AUS	BEL (FL)	CAN	DEN	GER	IRE	NZ	SWE	UK	Certifications	Album
"Alone"	2016	—	—	—	—	—	—	—	—	—	—		Non-album singles
"Sober"	2017	—	—	—	—	—	—	—	—	—	—		Non-album singles
"Beautiful"	2017	— (Note: "Beautiful" did not enter the Billboard Hot 100, but peaked at number 19 on the Bubbling Under Hot 100 chart.)	15	—	—	—	79	—	—	—	—	RIAA: 4× Platinum; ARIA: 3× Platinum; IFPI DEN: Gold; MC: Platinum	Cosmic
"Mine"	2017	11	11	25	13	5	25	22	3	4	21	RIAA: 5× Platinum; ARIA: 3× Platinum; BPI: Platinum; BVMI: Gold; GLF: Platinum; IFPI DEN: Platinum; MC: 5× Platinum; RMNZ: Platinum	Cosmic
"Why"	2018	—	—	—	—	—	—	—	—	—	—	RIAA: Platinum; MC: Platinum	Cosmic
"Gone"	2018	—	—	—	—	—	—	—	—	—	—		Cosmic
"Honest"	2018	—	—	—	—	—	—	—	—	—	—	RIAA: Gold; MC: Gold	Cosmic
"Beautiful" (featuring Camila Cabello)	2018	26	—	— (Note: "Beautiful" did not enter the Flemish Ultratop 50, but peaked at number four on the Ultratip chart.)	35	—	—	19	23	60	33	RIAA: 4× Platinum; ARIA: 2× Platinum; BPI: Gold; MC: 4× Platinum; RMNZ: 3× Platinum	Non-album singles
"I Don't Even Know You Anymore" (with Netsky and Lil Wayne)	2019	—	—	42	—	—	—	—	— (Note: "I Don't Even Know You Anymore" did not enter the NZ Top 40 Singles Chart, but peaked at number 17 on the NZ Hot Singles Chart.)	—	—		Non-album singles
"Caught in the Fire"	2019	—	—	—	—	—	—	—	— (Note: "Caught in the Fire" did not enter the NZ Top 40 Singles Chart, but peaked at number 33 on the NZ Hot Singles Chart.)	—	—		Non-album singles
"Paradise"	2019	91	37	— (Note: "Paradise" did not enter the Flemish Ultratop 50, but peaked at number 25 on the Ultratip chart.)	64	—	—	29	23	60	64	RIAA: Platinum; ARIA: Platinum; BPI: Silver; MC: 2× Platinum	Soul Searching
"Focus" (featuring 21 Savage)	2019	— (Note: "Focus" did not enter the Billboard Hot 100, but peaked at number 24 on the Bubbling Under Hot 100 chart.)	92	—	—	—	—	—	— (Note: "Focus" did not enter the NZ Top 40 Singles Chart, but peaked at number 17 on the NZ Hot Singles Chart.)	—	—	MC: Gold	Soul Searching
"I.F.L.Y."	2019	— (Note: "I.F.L.Y." did not enter the Billboard Hot 100, but peaked at number nine on the Bubbling Under Hot 100 chart.)	41	—	85	—	—	75	28	—	—	RIAA: Platinum; ARIA: Platinum; MC: Platinum	Soul Searching
"Young & Alive"	2020	—	—	—	—	—	—	—	— (Note: "Young & Alive" did not enter the NZ Top 40 Singles Chart, but peaked at number 10 on the NZ Hot Singles Chart.)	—	—		Infinite Dream
"Renee's Song"	2020	—	—	—	—	—	—	—	— (Note: "Renee's Song" did not enter the NZ Top 40 Singles Chart, but peaked at number 13 on the NZ Hot Singles Chart.)	—	—		Non-album singles
"I Got You"	2020	—	—	—	—	—	—	—	— (Note: "I Got You" did not enter the NZ Top 40 Singles Chart, but peaked at number 13 on the NZ Hot Singles Chart.)	—	—		Non-album singles
"I Don't Think I'm Okay"	2020	—	—	—	—	—	—	—	— (Note: "I Don't Think I'm Okay" did not enter the NZ Top 40 Singles Chart, but peaked at number 20 on the NZ Hot Singles Chart.)	—	—		Non-album singles
"Crazy"	2020	—	—	—	—	—	—	—	—	—	—		Non-album singles
"I Like That"	2021	—	—	—	—	—	—	—	— (Note: "I Like That" did not enter the NZ Top 40 Singles Chart, but peaked at number 32 on the NZ Hot Singles Chart.)	—	—		Infinite Dream
"Will It Ever Feel the Same?"	2022	—	—	—	—	—	—	—	— (Note: "Will It Ever Feel the Same?" did not enter the NZ Top 40 Singles Chart, but peaked at number 36 on the NZ Hot Singles Chart.)	—	—		Infinite Dream
"Miss America"	2022	—	—	—	—	—	—	—	—	—	—		Infinite Dream
"Heaven"	2022	—	—	—	—	—	—	—	— (Note: "Heaven" did not enter the NZ Top 40 Singles Chart, but peaked at number 29 on the NZ Hot Singles Chart.)	—	—		Infinite Dream
"Eyes"	2023	—	—	—	—	—	—	—	—	—	—		Non-album singles
"Doing Time"	2023	—	—	—	—	—	—	—	—	—	—		Non-album singles
"Beautiful World"	2023	—	—	—	—	—	—	—	—	—	—		Non-album singles
"F U"	2024	—	—	—	—	—	—	—	—	—	—		Non-album singles
"Somewhere In Between"	2024	—	—	—	—	—	—	—	—	—	—		Non-album singles
"Still Feel Alone"	2024	—	—	—	—	—	—	—	—	—	—		Non-album singles
"Something Bout April"	2024	—	—	—	—	—	—	—	—	—	—		Non-album singles
"Anything"	2024	—	—	—	—	—	—	—	—	—	—		Non-album singles
"Pretty Lies"	2024	—	—	—	—	—	—	—	—	—	—		Non-album singles
"Nothing On U"	2025	—	—	—	—	—	—	—	—	—	—		TBA
"Moment"	2026	—	—	—	—	—	—	—	—	—	—		TBA
"—" denotes items which were not released in that country or failed to chart.

=== Singles as featured artist ===
Title	Year	Album
"Strings" (Max featuring Jvke and Bazzi)	2023	Love in Stereo

=== Other charted or certified songs ===
Title	Year	Peak chart positions			Certifications	Album
Title	Year	NZ Heat.	NZ Hot	SWE Heat.	Certifications	Album
"Myself"	2018	10	—	—	RIAA: Gold; MC: Platinum; RMNZ: Platinum	Cosmic
"3:15"	2018	—	—	—	RIAA: Gold; MC: Platinum	Cosmic
"No Way!"	2019	—	9	3		Soul Searching
"—" denotes items which were not released in that country or failed to chart.

== Music videos ==
Year	Title	Director	Ref.
2018	"Mine"	Benjamin Kutsko	
2018	"Honest"	MIGGY	
2018	"Myself"	Daniel Henry	
2018	"Beautiful"	Sherif Higazy	
2018	"Beautiful (feat. Camila Cabello)"	Jason Koenig	
2018	"Dreams"	MIGGY	
2019	"3:15"	Sherif Higazy	
2019	"Paradise"	Bon Duke	
2019	"I.F.L.Y."	Madison Shelton	
2019	"Soul Searching"	Geoff Taylor	
2020	"Young & Alive"	Unknown	
2020	"Renee's Song"	Renee Herbert	
2020	"I Don't Think I'm Okay"	Unknown	
2021	"I Like That"	Christian Breslauer	
2021	"Miss America"	Abigail Wilson	
2022	"Heaven"	Unknown	
2024	"Somewhere In Between"	Unknown	
2024	"Still Feel Alone"	Unknown	
2024	"Pretty Lies"	Unknown	

== Tours ==
Opening act

- Camila Cabello – Never Be the Same Tour (2018)
- Justin Timberlake – Man of the Woods Tour (2018)

Headlining Tour

- The Cosmic Tour (2018)
- Bazzi Live in Asia (2019)
- Infinite Dream Tour (2022)

== Awards and nominations ==
Year	Award	Category	Nominee	Result	Ref.
2018	MTV Video Music Awards	Best New Artist	Himself	Nominated	
2018	BreakTudo Awards	Artist on the Rise	Himself	Nominated	
2018	MTV Europe Music Awards	Best New	Himself	Nominated	
2018	MTV Europe Music Awards	Best Push	Himself	Nominated	
2018	iHeartRadio Titanium Award	1 Billion Total Audience Spins on iHeartRadio Stations	"Mine"	Won	
2019	iHeartRadio Music Awards	Best New Pop Artist	Himself	Nominated	
2019	Billboard Music Awards	Top New Artist	Himself	Nominated	
2019	BMI Pop Awards	Award-Winning Song	"Mine"	Won	

== See also ==
- History of the Middle Eastern people in Metro Detroit
