= Focus (Bazzi song) =

Single by Bazzi featuring 21 Savage

from the album Soul Searching
- Released: June 13, 2019
- Length: 2:35
- Label: Atlantic
- Songwriters: Andrew Bazzi; Shéyaa Bin Abraham-Joseph
- Producers: Bazzi; Kevin White

Bazzi singles chronology
"Paradise" (2019)	"Focus" (2019)	"I.F.L.Y." (2019)

21 Savage singles chronology
"Monster" (2019)	"Focus" (2019)	"100 Bands" (2019)

"Focus" is a song by American singer Bazzi featuring rapper 21 Savage, released as a single through Atlantic Records on June 13, 2019. It is the second single from Bazzi's debut mixtape Soul Searching.

== Critical reception ==
HotNewHipHop said the track "has all the makings of a successful crossover hit" and could be "picked up by pop radio as well as the typical hip-hop stations".

== Promotion ==
Bazzi teased the song in June 2019, asking his followers if they wanted new music with a "special guest".

== Charts ==
Chart (2019)	Peak position
Australia (ARIA)	92
Lithuania (AGATA)	61
New Zealand Hot Singles (RMNZ)	17
US Bubbling Under Hot 100 (Billboard)	24

== Certifications ==
Region	Certification	Certified units/sales
Canada (Music Canada)	Gold	40,000^{‡}
^{‡} Sales+streaming figures based on certification alone.
