= Wölfli =

Wölfli is a Swiss surname that may refer to:

- Adolf Wölfli (1864-1930), Swiss artist
- Marco Wölfli (b. 1982), Swiss football player
- Richard Wolfli (b. 1966), Oil & Gas Executive
- James Wolfli (b. 1975), Plastic & Reconstructive Surgeon
