= Mine (Bazzi song) =

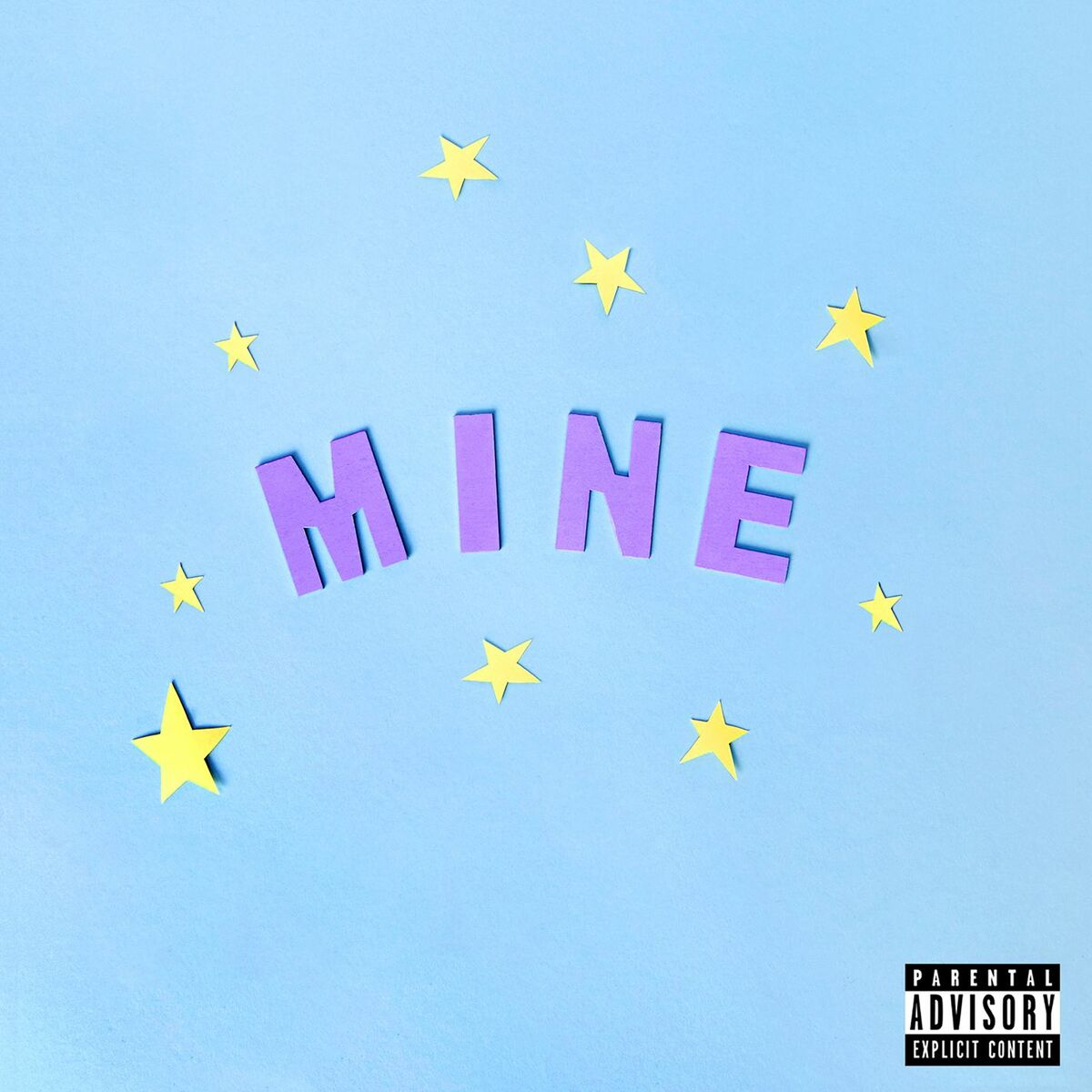

Single by Bazzi

from the album Cosmic
- Released: October 12, 2017
- Recorded: 2017
- Genre: Pop
- Length: 2:11
- Label: iamcosmic; Atlantic
- Songwriter: Andrew Bazzi
- Producers: Bazzi; Rice N' Peas

Bazzi singles chronology
"Beautiful" (2017)	"Mine" (2017)	"Why?" (2018)

Music video
- "Mine" on YouTube

"Mine" is a song by American singer-songwriter Bazzi. The song was self-released digitally on October 12, 2017. The song made its chart debut on February 3, 2018, after becoming an internet meme. The song charted in various countries including the United States, where it peaked at number 11 on the Billboard Hot 100. The single was certified platinum in the United States, Australia, Canada, Sweden and New Zealand. The song was later featured as the 14th track on his debut album Cosmic, which was released on April 12, 2018.

== Background and release ==
Bazzi recorded the initial ideas for the song in a few voice memos that were dated July 5, 2017. One contained him whistling the opening notes of the song, another contained him beatboxing, and another contained him singing the lyrics “I'm so fucking happy you're alive” which ended up being used in the final song.

The song became an internet meme after gaining popularity in late January 2018. The videos featured a slideshow of different pictures of the subject of the video with the Snapchat "hearts" filter and overlaying lyrics. The last word of each song line was surrounded by different "heart" and "kiss" emojis.

== Charts ==
=== Weekly charts ===
Weekly chart performance for "Mine"
Chart (2018)	Peak position
Australia (ARIA)	11
Austria (Ö3 Austria Top 40)	27
Belgium (Ultratop 50 Flanders)	25
Belgium (Ultratip Bubbling Under Wallonia)	1
Bolivia (Monitor Latino)	15
Canada (Canadian Hot 100)	13
CIS Airplay (TopHit)	73
Colombia (National-Report)	85
Czech Republic Airplay (ČNS IFPI)	47
Czech Republic Singles Digital (ČNS IFPI)	22
Denmark (Tracklisten)	5
Finland (Suomen virallinen lista)	11
France (SNEP)	71
Germany (GfK)	25
Hungary (Stream Top 40)	18
Italy (FIMI)	40
Lebanon (Lebanese Top 20)	8
Malaysia (RIM)	5
Mexico Airplay (Billboard)	49
Netherlands (Dutch Top 40)	29
Netherlands (Single Top 100)	37
New Zealand (Recorded Music NZ)	3
Norway (VG-lista)	5
Portugal (AFP)	11
Romania (Airplay 100)	73
Russia Airplay (Tophit)	51
Scottish Singles Sales (Official Charts)	46
Singapore (RIAS)	9
Slovakia Singles Digital (ČNS IFPI)	19
Slovenia (SloTop50)	45
Spain (Promusicae)	66
Sweden (Sverigetopplistan)	4
Switzerland (Schweizer Hitparade)	27
UK Singles (Official Charts)	21
US Billboard Hot 100	11
US Adult Top 40 (Billboard)	23
US Dance/Mix Show Airplay (Billboard)	4
US Mainstream Top 40 (Billboard)	1
US Rhythmic (Billboard)	3

=== Year-end charts ===
Year-end chart performance for "Mine"
Chart (2018)	Position
Australia (ARIA)	47
Canada (Canadian Hot 100)	45
Denmark (Tracklisten)	41
France (SNEP)	190
New Zealand (Recorded Music NZ)	24
Portugal (AFP)	37
Romania (Airplay 100)	59
Sweden (Sverigetopplistan)	78
US Billboard Hot 100	21
US Dance/Mix Show Airplay (Billboard)	6
US Mainstream Top 40 (Billboard)	8
US Rhythmic (Billboard)	19

== Certifications ==
Certifications for "Mine"
Region	Certification	Certified units/sales
Australia (ARIA)	3× Platinum	210,000^{‡}
Brazil (Pro-Música Brasil)	Diamond	250,000^{‡}
Canada (Music Canada)	5× Platinum	400,000^{‡}
Denmark (IFPI Danmark)	Platinum	90,000^{‡}
France (SNEP)	Gold	100,000^{‡}
Germany (BVMI)	Gold	200,000^{‡}
Italy (FIMI)	Gold	25,000^{‡}
New Zealand (RMNZ)	Platinum	30,000^{‡}
Poland (ZPAV)	Platinum	20,000^{‡}
Portugal (AFP)	Platinum	10,000^{‡}
Spain (Promusicae)	Gold	30,000^{‡}
Switzerland (IFPI Switzerland)	Gold	10,000^{‡}
United Kingdom (BPI)	Platinum	600,000^{‡}
United States (RIAA)	5× Platinum	5,000,000^{‡}
Streaming
Sweden (GLF)	Platinum	8,000,000^{†}
^{‡} Sales+streaming figures based on certification alone.^{†} Streaming-only figures based on certification alone.

== Covers ==
- Electronic musicians Krewella and BKAYE released a cover of Mine in June 2018.
