= Beautiful (Bazzi song) =

2017 single by Bazzi

Single by Bazzi

from the album Cosmic
- Released: July 2, 2017
- Genre: Pop; R&B
- Length: 2:58
- Label: iamcosmic; Atlantic
- Songwriters: Andrew Bazzi; Kevin Clark White; Michael Clinton Woods
- Producer: Will Patterson

Bazzi singles chronology
"Sober" (2016)	"Beautiful" (2017)	"Mine" (2017)

Music video
- "Beautiful" on YouTube

"Beautiful" is a song by American singer Bazzi, initially self-released digitally on July 2, 2017. The song was later featured as the 13th track on the album Cosmic, which was released on April 12, 2018. A reimagined version of the song, featuring Cuban-American singer-songwriter Camila Cabello was released on August 2, 2018.

== Credits and personnel ==
Credits adapted from Cosmic album liner notes.

Publishing

- Published by Zipendat Music / Artist 101 Publishing Group (BMI) Admin. by Warner Chappell; MCWII Publishing (ASCAP); The Otis Publishing (SESAC)

Recording

- Engineered in Los Angeles, California
- Mixed at Larrabee Studio, West Hollywood, California
- Mastered at Sterling Sound, New York City, New York

Personnel

- Bazzi – vocals, songwriting, production
- Rice N’ Peas – production, mixing
- Chris Gehringer – production
- Kevin White – record engineering, songwriting
- Michael Woods – songwriting
- Robin Florent – record engineering
- Scott Desmarais – record engineering
- Aubry "Big Juice" Delaine – record engineering
- Chris Galland – mixing engineering

== Charts ==
=== Weekly charts ===
2018 weekly chart performance for "Beautiful"
Chart (2018)	Peak position
Australia (ARIA)	15
Germany (GfK)	79
Switzerland (Schweizer Hitparade)	92
US Bubbling Under Hot 100 (Billboard)	19

2026 weekly chart performance for "Beautiful"
Chart (2026)	Peak position
Malaysia (IFPI)	15
Malaysia International (RIM)	8
Philippines (Philippines Hot 100)	34

=== Year-end charts ===
Year-end chart performance for "Beautiful"
Chart (2018)	Peak position
Australia (ARIA)	94
Portugal (AFP)	75
Chart (2019)	Position
Portugal (AFP)	133

== Certifications ==
Region	Certification	Certified units/sales
Australia (ARIA)	3× Platinum	210,000^{‡}
Brazil (Pro-Música Brasil)	Platinum	40,000^{‡}
Canada (Music Canada)	Platinum	80,000^{‡}
Denmark (IFPI Danmark)	Gold	45,000^{‡}
Italy (FIMI)	Gold	25,000^{‡}
Poland (ZPAV)	Platinum	20,000^{‡}
Portugal (AFP)	Platinum	10,000^{‡}
Spain (Promusicae)	Gold	30,000^{‡}
Switzerland (IFPI Switzerland)	Gold	10,000^{‡}
^{‡} Sales+streaming figures based on certification alone.

== Release history ==
Region	Date	Format	Label	Ref.
Various	July 2, 2017	Digital download; streaming	iamcosmic; Atlantic	

== Camila Cabello reimagined version ==
"Beautiful"

Single by Bazzi featuring Camila Cabello
- Released: August 2, 2018
- Genre: Pop; R&B
- Length: 3:00
- Label: iamcosmic; Atlantic
- Songwriters: Andrew Bazzi; Camila Cabello; Kevin Edward Brewster White; Michael Clinton Woods
- Producers: Rice N' Peas; Louis Bell (voc. for Cabello’s verses)

Bazzi singles chronology
"Honest" (2018)	"Beautiful" (2018)	"I Don't Even Know You Anymore" (2019)

Camila Cabello singles chronology
"Sangria Wine" (2018)	"Beautiful" (2018)	"Real Friends" (2018)

Music video
- "Beautiful" on YouTube

The duet version featuring American singer Camila Cabello was released on August 2, 2018.

=== Chart performance ===
The duet version peaked at number 26 on the Billboard Hot 100, 33 in the UK and 35 in Canada. Internationally, the song peaked at number 2 in Malaysia, 3 in Lebanon and Singapore, 4 in Belgium and Romania, and various spots in the Top 20 and Top 40.

=== Music video ===
The music video for "Beautiful" featuring Cabello was released on October 15, 2018, directed by Jason Koenig.

=== Track listing ===
Digital download
No.	Title	Length
1.	"Beautiful" (featuring Camila Cabello)	3:00

Streaming – Hook n Sling remix
No.	Title	Length
1.	"Beautiful" (featuring Camila Cabello)	2:51

Streaming – Pastel remix
No.	Title	Length
1.	"Beautiful" (featuring Camila Cabello)	2:54

Streaming – EDX remix
No.	Title	Length
1.	"Beautiful" (featuring Camila Cabello)	3:07

Streaming – Jerome Price remix
No.	Title	Length
1.	"Beautiful" (featuring Camila Cabello)	3:26

=== Credits and personnel ===
Credits adapted from Tidal.

Personnel

- Bazzi – vocals, songwriting, production
- Camila Cabello – vocals, songwriting
- Rice N’ Peas – production, mixing
- Chris Gehringer – production
- Louis Bell – vocals production (for new verses)
- Kevin White – record engineering
- Robin Florent – record engineering
- Scott Desmarais – record engineering
- Aubry "Big Juice" Delaine – record engineering
- Chris Galland – mixing engineering

=== Charts ===
==== Weekly charts ====
Chart (2018–19)	Peak position
Belgium (Ultratip Bubbling Under Flanders)	4
Belgium (Ultratip Bubbling Under Wallonia)	20
Canada Hot 100 (Billboard)	35
CIS Airplay (TopHit)	109
Czech Republic Singles Digital (ČNS IFPI)	45
Germany (GfK)	79
Greece International Digital (IFPI)	24
Hungary (Stream Top 40)	36
Ireland (IRMA)	19
Lebanon (Lebanese Top 20)	3
Malaysia (RIM)	2
Netherlands (Single Top 100)	73
New Zealand (Recorded Music NZ)	23
Norway (VG-lista)	18
Portugal (AFP)	20
Puerto Rico (Monitor Latino)	19
Romania (Airplay 100)	15
Romania (Romania Radio Airplay)	4
Scotland Singles (Official Charts)	57
Singapore (RIAS)	3
Slovakia Airplay (ČNS IFPI)	43
Slovakia Singles Digital (ČNS IFPI)	37
Sweden (Sverigetopplistan)	60
UK Singles (Official Charts)	33
US Billboard Hot 100	26
US Adult Pop Airplay (Billboard)	39
US Dance Club Songs (Billboard)	53
US Pop Airplay (Billboard)	7
US Rhythmic Airplay (Billboard)	29

==== Year-end charts ====
Chart (2018)	Position
Romania (Airplay 100)	87
Chart (2019)	Position
US Billboard Hot 100	95
US Mainstream Top 40 (Billboard)	36

=== Certifications ===
Region	Certification	Certified units/sales
Brazil (Pro-Música Brasil)	3× Platinum	120,000^{‡}
Canada (Music Canada)	4× Platinum	320,000^{‡}
France (SNEP)	Gold	100,000^{‡}
New Zealand (RMNZ)	3× Platinum	90,000^{‡}
Norway (IFPI Norway)	Gold	20,000^{‡}
United Kingdom (BPI)	Gold	400,000^{‡}
United States (RIAA)	4× Platinum	4,000,000^{‡}
^{‡} Sales+streaming figures based on certification alone.

=== Release history ===
List of release dates, showing region, format(s), version(s), label(s) and reference(s)
Region	Date	Format(s)	Version(s)	Label(s)	Ref.
Various	August 2, 2018	Digital download; streaming	Original	iamcosmic; Atlantic	
Various	September 28, 2018	Digital download; streaming	Hook n Sling remix	iamcosmic; Atlantic	
Various	September 28, 2018	Digital download; streaming	Pastel remix	iamcosmic; Atlantic	
Various	September 28, 2018	Digital download; streaming	EDX remix	iamcosmic; Atlantic	
Various	September 28, 2018	Digital download; streaming	Jerome Price remix	iamcosmic; Atlantic	
Italy	October 19, 2018	Contemporary hit radio	Original	Warner Music	
