= Focus Services =

Focus Services LLC
- Type: Private
- Industry: Business process outsourcing (BPO); Offshore outsourcing; Call center consulting; Telemarketing; Back-office support
- Founded: 1995
- Founder: John Porter
- Headquarters: 4102 South 1900 West, Roy, Utah 84067, United States
- Area served: International clients
- Key people: Paul Liljenquist (President); Bill Wiser (Vice President – Information Technology); Bryan Tesh (Vice President – Accounting & Finance); Jan Santafede (Vice President – Marketing and Relationship Management); Benjamin Markland (Vice President – Operations)
- Services: Call centers, BPO, customer support and back-office processing
- Number of employees: over 3,000 worldwide
- Subsidiaries: Focus Direct Inc. - Bacolod (Philippines); Focus El Salvador
- Website: www.focusservices.com

Focus Services LLC is a privately owned call center service provider, specializing in multi-product telesales and customer relationship management founded in 1995. It has locations in the United States, El Salvador, Nicaragua, and the Philippines.

It offers product direct sales support services, including television ads, radio spots, Internet promotions, and direct mailers; customer service support; and technical support services. It also offers third party quality assurance/monitoring, sales order processing verification, and customer experience survey services to companies, including outsource vendors.

Focus has over 3,000 employees working in 12 Focus facilities, both domestically and internationally. It operates as Focus Direct Inc. (or Focus Direct Inc. - Bacolod) in the Philippines, and as Focus El Salvador in El Salvador, both subsidiaries of Focus Services.

== Locations ==
United States

- Roy, Utah, Headquarters
- Greenville, North Carolina
- Tarboro, North Carolina
- Clinton, Iowa
- Dubuque, Iowa
- Jacksonville, Florida
- Beaumont, Texas

El Salvador

- San Salvador

Nicaragua

- Managua

Philippines

- Bacolod

== See also ==
- Business process outsourcing
- Offshore outsourcing
- Call center industry in the Philippines
