= Families OverComing Under Stress =

FOCUS (Families Overcoming Under Stress™) is a family-level resiliency training program designed to assist families experiencing high levels of stress and to prevent greater problems from occurring in the face of further stressors.

FOCUS is based on leading evidence-based family intervention models for at-risk families, and aims to strengthen family cohesion and parent-child, marital, and co-parenting relationships. FOCUS is structured around families’ development of a shared understanding of past experiences, as well as skill building in the areas of emotional regulation, communication, problem solving, goal setting, and managing trauma and loss reminders.

The core component of the FOCUS intervention is a six to eight session skills training program, with specific parent-only sessions, child-only sessions, and sessions including the whole family. When possible, both parents participate in the program; it can be conducted with one member participating long distance. Earlier research has found that families who complete this short program report lower levels of distress and fewer behavioral symptoms in both parents and children, along with gains in children’s prosocial behavior and stronger family resilience.

The FOCUS intervention has been adapted for use with a variety of populations experiencing family stressors and is utilized in an array of settings across the United States and in Japan.

FOCUS for Military Families, designed to address the stress of an increased operational tempo and multiple deployments on military families, is currently offered at 18 U.S. military sites. FOCUS offers several adaptations of the intervention, each of which uses the same core set of skills and the creation of a family narrative to assist military families facing challenges. FOCUS works with couples to increase their communication skills and understanding of each other’s experiences. When working with families with kids ages 3 to 5, FOCUS focuses on bolstering parenting skills and building parents’ understanding of their child’s reactions to stressors. When working with combat injured soldiers and their families, the FOCUS intervention helps families adjust to the specific changes and challenges that accompany combat injury. Parts of the FOCUS curriculum are also utilized with the National Military Family Association’s Operation Purple Family Retreats, a program that provides four-day retreats to recently reunited military families.

In addition to its use with military families, FOCUS has been utilized in two Southern California Children’s Hospitals to address the needs of children and families facing a variety of types of trauma (e.g., severe illness, violence, or traumatic loss). FOCUS has also been used to help disaster relief workers and their families grow stronger in the face of some of the challenges they face.

Ways to Manage Family Related Stress

- Communicate openly with your family about how you feel. Keeping communication honest and supportive allows everyone to express their emotions when they need to.
- Ask questions if you are unsure how a family member is coping with stress. For example, if your children are involved in many activities, take time to talk with them about whether they are enjoying their schedule or if it feels overwhelming.
- Learn to say no when things become too stressful. Avoid taking on more responsibilities than you can handle. This might mean declining to host the baseball team picnic or skipping a neighborhood potluck when your schedule is already full.
- Set clear family boundaries and priorities, and stick to them. One of the biggest causes of family stress is trying to do too much in a limited amount of time. When schedules become too crowded, family members may stop enjoying the activities they once loved and important things can start to slip through the cracks.
- Involve the entire family in activities and responsibilities. Parents often spend so much time trying to make everything perfect for their children that they miss out on meaningful time together. When planning family events, work as a team. For example, if you are hosting a gathering, let the kids help with preparations so everyone feels included and connected.
