= The Focus Foundation =

American research foundation established in 2005

The Focus Foundation, located in Davidsonville, Maryland, is a research foundation dedicated to identifying and assisting families and children who have X and Y Chromosomal Variations (also called X & Y chromosomal variations), dyslexia and/or developmental coordination disorder. These conditions can lead to language-based disabilities, motor planning deficits, reading dysfunction, and attention and behavioral disorders. The Focus Foundation believes that, through increased awareness, early identification, and specific and targeted treatment, children with these conditions can reach their full potential.

The Focus Foundation leads in the research of X and Y Chromosomal Variations with 25% of all publications on the disorders. The foundation also leads the research field in testosterone treatment for the testosterone deficiency associated with extra X chromosomes.

The Focus Foundation was established in 2005 by Carole Samango-Sprouse. Dr. Samango-Sprouse is also the director of the Neurodevelopmental Diagnostic Center for Young Children, located near Annapolis, Maryland, and an associate clinical professor of pediatrics at The George Washington University in Washington, D.C., and an adjunct associate professor in the Department of Human and Molecular Genetics at Florida International University. She serves as the executive director and Chief Science Officer of The Focus Foundation and has experience with the three disorders that are the Foundation's focus: X & Y chromosomal variations, developmental dyspraxia and dyslexia. The Focus Foundation attempts to increase awareness an X and Y chromosomal variations in order to help children with these disorders. Although all physicians, ancillary health care providers and special educators are taught that genetic abnormalities can impact a child's development, practitioners often receive insufficient information about these disorders, and, therefore, do not often test for X & Y chromosomal variations when a child presents with neurodevelopmental concerns. By promoting awareness of these disorders and associated symptoms, The Focus Foundation hopes to increase early identification, implement interventions, and help families pursue optimal outcomes for their children.

== Diagnosis of X & Y variations ==
X & Y variations are common but frequently undiagnosed genetic conditions that differ from the normal sex chromosome pairings of XX for females and XY for males. Errors in recombination during meiosis produce additional X or Y chromosomes when compared to the typical complement of 46,XX or 46,XY. The resulting chromosomes (47 or more) may impact a child's neurodevelopment and cognition. Twenty-one babies born each day have an X & Y chromosomal variation, and only five will be diagnosed in their lifetime.

In addition, twenty percent of school-aged children illustrate signs of learning dysfunction. Given the frequency of X & Y chromosomal variations in the general population, children who present with learning disorders of an unknown etiology should receive genetic testing to rule out these common disorders. Only 5% of children with dyslexia are ever identified in their lifetime although they have symptoms presenting by 6 years of age, while most children with developmental dyspraxia are misdiagnosed with other disorders such as just speech delay, behavior problems, or ADHD. The Focus Foundation works with healthcare providers, specialists, and parents to properly diagnosis, research, and organize a specific and targeted treatment for children with X & Y chromosomal variations. With the proper diagnosis and intervention, children who have these neurogenetic disorders are transformed from vulnerable to powerful and become more confident, able, and successful than they have ever been.

The Focus Foundation aims to inform professionals and families throughout the country, as well as around the world about these disorders. The organization has hosted international clinics in the United Kingdom, Italy, and, more recently, Australia. These conferences invite families and physicians for consultations and speeches from a multi-disciplinary team of experts specializing in these disorders. By promoting the spread of accurate and novel information about the incidence, diagnosis, symptoms, and management of these disorders, The Focus Foundation aims to encourage recovery worldwide. With help, all of these children can reach their full potential.

The Focus Foundation consists of scientists, scholars, educators, health care providers, fundraising and marketing experts, and volunteers that work together on these issues and help change these children's lives. The team conducts and presents research projects in order to further expand our understanding of these disorders. The Focus Foundation attends international and domestic meetings in order to foster partnerships in order to research, educate and train medical professionals and the community about developmental disturbances, brain-based intervention, and syndrome-specific treatment.

=== Conditions Researched ===
The Focus Foundation researches and helps families with children who have X and Y chromosomal variations, dyslexia, and/or dyspraxia. The X and Y Chromosomal Variations studied by The Focus Foundation include: · 45,X (Turner syndrome): · 47,XXX (Triple X syndrome; Trisomy X) · 47,XXY (Klinefelter syndrome) · 47,XYY (Jacob syndrome) · 48,XXXY · 48,XXYY · 48,XXXX · 49,XXXXY

=== Assistance provided ===
The Focus Foundation works with families, healthcare providers and educators.

=== Families ===
The Focus Foundation helps families identify and understand specific reasons for their child's difficulties in school, behavioral problems, or developmental delays. In addition, through their research, the team identifies the treatment and management strategies that effectively allow children with X & Y chromosome variations and other rare disorders to reach their optimal outcome. These personalized recommendations are based one years of expertise and impact on health and well being as well as home, school and community life.

=== Health care practitioners ===
Most health care practitioners are not familiar with chromosome variations and, therefore, rarely consider X & Y chromosomal variations as a possible explanation for developmental concerns. The Focus Foundation works to inform practitioners of common signs that might indicate that a child has a chromosome variation, as well as provide resources and partnerships with which to offer genetic testing for these disorders. With the introduction of more accurate and affordable testing, X & Y chromosome variations are beginning to be more widely known in the medical community.

=== Educators ===
The Focus Foundation informs these professionals on how to work with and optimize the outcome in spite of developmental concerns or special needs: from providing teachers with resources and strategies to determining what kinds of outside services each child may need. With the development and administration of appropriate therapeutic intervention, every child has the opportunity to achieve their goals.

== Conferences ==
The Focus Foundation hosts several conferences annually for different groups; these conferences include expert speakers that specialize in Neurodevelopment, Pediatric Genetics and Neurology, Endocrinology, Orthopedics, Immunology, Physical Therapy, Speech and Language, and Occupational Therapy.

=== The Atypical Learner Conference ===
First held in 2011, The Atypical Learner Conference is designed for parents and caregivers of bright children who might be struggling to succeed in school. This conference focuses on understanding common causes, explanations, and treatments for dyslexia, ADHD, speech delay, school failure, and behavioral difficulties.

=== Annual Conference for Children with 49,XXXXY ===
Now in its sixteenth year, this is the largest gathering of this rare disorder in the world, with attendees traveling from across the United States and the globe. The Maryland conference features patient evaluations by a multidisciplinary team of physicians who specialize in rare chromosomal variations and have established themselves as experts in their fields. These and other experts present pertinent and educational information about 49,XXXXY to parents in order to better equip families to pursue optimal outcomes for their child.

=== Annual Conference for Children with 48,XXXY ===
Similar to the conference for children with 49,XXXXY, this conference focuses on children with 48,XXXY, their families and healthcare providers.

== Research ==
The Focus Foundation engages in research of the general biological causes and potential treatments of aspects of the phenotype of X and Y Chromosomal Variations. Research includes the impact of each additive X, the potential benefit of testosterone replacement therapy at different integral junctures, and the regional brain differences within each disorder and treatment group.
