= Anti-Nazi Council =

1930s British anti-Nazi group

The Anti-Nazi Council was a London-based organisation of the 1930s. Initially part of the left-wing anti-fascist movement, it gained political significance when allied to Winston Churchill, though at the time its influence was largely covert. Between around 1935 and 1937 it was a vehicle for Churchill's attempts to form a cross-party alliance against appeasement of the fascist dictatorships. The group behind it used the title Focus in Defence of Freedom and Peace, and variants, and is sometimes known as the Focus Group.

== Establishment ==
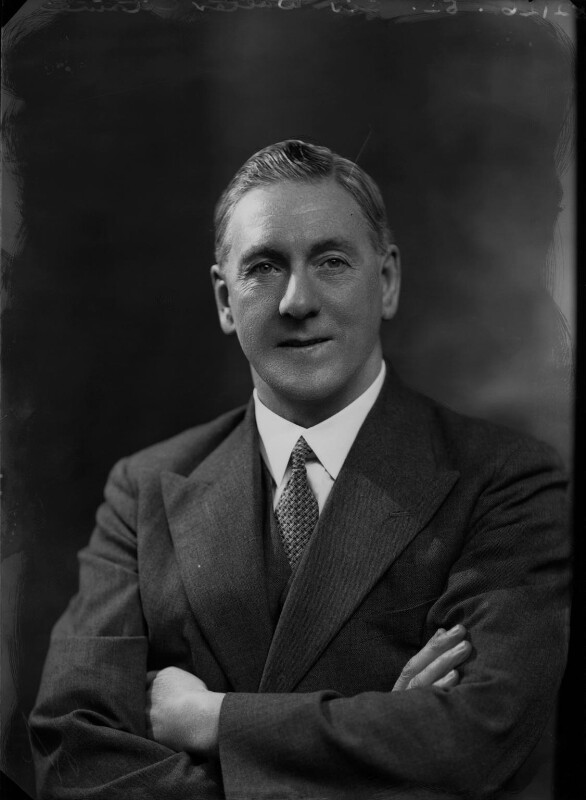
Walter Citrine

The British Non-Sectarian Anti-Nazi Council (BNSANC) was founded in 1934, with Walter Citrine as president. A parallel World Non-Sectarian Anti-Nazi Council to Champion Human Rights (WNSANCHR) was founded at the same time. These organisations were developments from the Non-Sectarian Anti-Nazi League founded by Samuel Untermyer to institute the 1933 anti-Nazi boycott. The establishment in November 1934 of the WNSANCHR was recognition of the need of a broader base for a boycott, and had support from 13 countries. The BNSANC organised a protest march in October 1935; it took place in Hyde Park, London and 20,000 people participated.

A key figure going forward was A. H. Richards, who had the title General Organising Secretary of the Anti-Nazi Council. He was Arthur Harold Richards (1889–1943), to 1935 Publicity Manager of the News Chronicle.

== Initial positions ==
The Anti-Nazi Council generally supported the approach to international affairs of the League of Nations Union (LNU), at the time when Churchill launched his "Arms and the Covenant" movement. In the period before the outbreak of the Spanish Civil War, Churchill was prepared to accept the League's view on collective security, and tone down his hostility to the Soviet Union. for the sake of containment of Nazi Germany.

== The "Focus" in 1936 ==
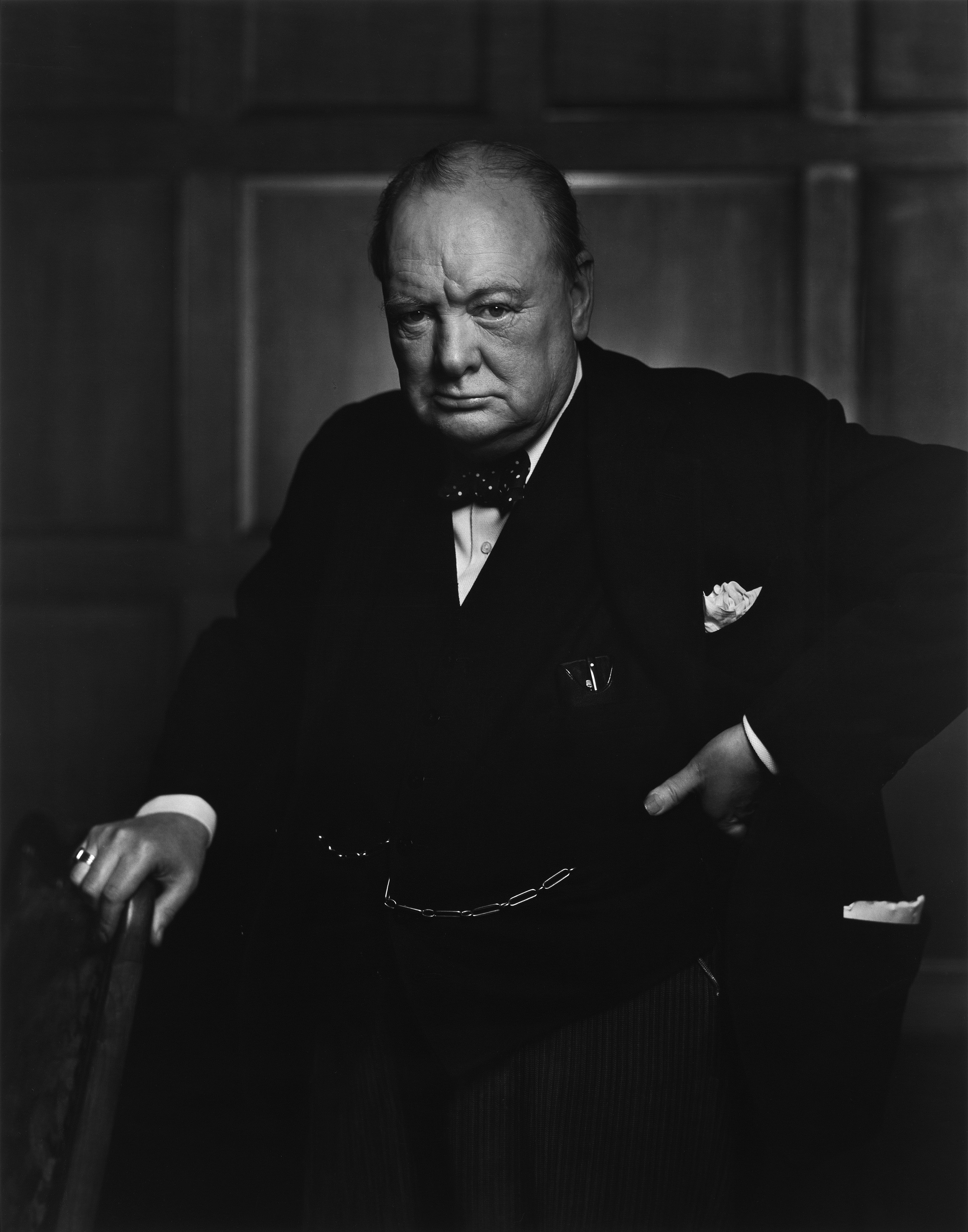
Winston Churchill

In February 1936 Churchill hosted a political weekend to which he invited the anti-appeaser Austen Chamberlain, who found the Prime Minister Stanley Baldwin complacent on defence, with others (Robert Boothby, Henry Page Croft, Edward Grigg, Robert Horne and Frederick Lindemann). In a letter to his sister Ida, Chamberlain equivocated over whether it had been a Cave of Adullam of plotters.

Over the summer, private meetings were convened around Churchill, and finance for group events provided by Robert Mond, Eugen Spier (1891–1971), and Robert Waley Cohen. A public meeting was planned for December, in the Albert Hall. The operations of this "Focus" were not generally known until 1963. In that year, Spier published a book Focus, a Footnote to the History of the Thirties giving a detailed account.

The first Focus luncheon attended by Churchill had other guests including Norman Angell, Margaret Bondfield, Hugh Dalton, Philip Guedalla, Julian Huxley, Oliver Locker-Lampson, Duncan Sandys and Wickham Steed. The group drew much support from the ranks of the liberal internationalists, such as Angell: others were Robert Cecil, David Davies of the New Commonwealth Society, Gilbert Murray, and the politicians Austen Chamberlain, Philip Noel-Baker, Eleanor Rathbone and Arthur Salter.

Rathbone like Violet Bonham Carter had belonged to the BNSANC; but unlike her never became one of Churchill's trusted inner circle, at the heart of the "Focus". Another difference was that Bonham Carter wrote for Willi Münzenberg's Die Zukunft. Archie Sinclair, the Liberal Party leader, was a close personal friend of Churchill. He hung back initially, wary of political entanglements, but joined the Focus by autumn 1936.

On 3 December 1936 the Focus group, with other anti-Fascist groups, held a large rally in the Albert Hall, at which Churchill spoke, under the "Arms and the Covenant" umbrella: support for British re-armament and the Covenant of the League of Nations. On that day the Abdication Crisis started, with the news breaking of Edward VIII's intended marriage. Churchill defended the king's position in parliament on 13 December, which Harold Nicolson thought brought to nothing the work of two years.

== The later Focus Group ==
Any immediate mass impact was lost: the group continued, but as individuals rather than a movement. By the end of 1937, Murray was commenting to Cecil on the convergence of the LNU's position with Churchill's.

Invited to a group lunch in March 1938, Harold Nicolson described it as "one of Winston's things", comprising Angell, Cecil and Steed with Walter Layton of the News Chronicle et al. On 29 September 1938, the day before the Munich Agreement was signed, Churchill convened the Focus Group for lunch at the Savoy Hotel, and again at 7pm to have a minatory telegram signed to go to Neville Chamberlain; Clement Attlee declined to have his name added, on the telephone. Among the signers were Cecil, Sinclair and Lord Lloyd. The story that Anthony Eden also declined to add his name is rejected by Eden's biographer Robert Rhodes James; who attributes the account to Violet Bonham Carter, as someone who disliked Eden and took a bleak view of his motivations.

== Spier in World War II ==
In October 1939, after the outbreak of World War II, Eugen Spier was one of some hundreds of aliens rounded up and detained in Olympia London. Under a policy of John Anderson, implemented by security forces, aliens including a high proportion of refugees were classified by tribunals, only a small proportion being held. He then found himself in a camp at Lingfield, Surrey set up from a race course. He described his experiences in the British internment system in The Protecting Power (1951).

The diary of Guy Liddell of MI5 shows that Churchill on 7 September 1939 enquired about Spier's arrest; but he was kept in detention after Liddell consulted a colleague. Liddell's entry for 30 September shows that Wickham Steed supplied evidence that meant Spier was kept in internment for a longer period.

== Supporters ==
- Victor Bulwer-Lytton, 2nd Earl of Lytton
