= List of Go Fighting! episodes =

Go Fighting! is a Chinese variety show broadcast on SMG: Dragon Television. It was first aired on 14 June 2015. Go Fighting! is classified as a game-variety-reality show, and the MCs and guests complete missions at a landmark to win the objective. Usually each episode will also have an overarching theme or story. Each episode varies in the challenges and the instructions given to the MCs, and rules are not strictly enforced, resulting in a largely unscripted show.

As of July 3, 2016, 26 episodes of Go Fighting!, including 1 special episode and a movie, have been aired.

== Series overview ==
Season	Episodes	Originally aired	
Season	Episodes	Premiere	Finale
Season 1	12	June 14, 2015	September 20, 2015
Special	1 special for China's National Day week	October 5, 2015	
Movie	1	January 15, 2016	
Season 2	12	April 17, 2016	July 3, 2016
Charity Concert (full)	1	July 10, 2016	
Season 3	12	July 9, 2017	November 17, 2017
Season 4	12	April 29, 2018	TBA

== List of Episodes ==
=== First Season ===
List of episodes in first season (episode 1/01 to 1/13)

Episode #	Broadcast Date (Filming Date)	Guest(s)	Landmark	Teams			Mission	Results
1/01	14 June 2015 (9 & 22 May 2015)	No guest	Expo Axis (Pudong, Shanghai)	Where did the time go? No Teams, Attack order: Wang Xun→Zhang Yixing→Sun Honglei→Huang Lei; Huang Lei→Show→Huang Bo→Wang Xun		1 to 12; Red Team; Wang Xun, Zhang Yixing, Sun Honglei; Blue Team; Huang Lei, Show, Huang Bo	Eliminate players by pressing the button on their chests, be the first team to reach and obtain the twelfth station	Wang Xun, Zhang Yixing, Sun Honglei; Wins
1/02	21 June 2015 (20 May 2015)	No guest	Shanghai Stock Exchange (Pudong, Shanghai)	The Heirs; No Teams			The person with second most gold bars and not tied	Zhang Yixing; Wins
1/03	28 June 2015 (1 June 2015)	Joe Chen	Wujiang Road (Jing'an, Shanghai)	The Bund 2015; Good Guys Team; Joe Chen, Huang Bo, Wang Xun, Zhang Yixing; Bad Guys Team; Sun Honglei, Huang Lei, Show			The team earning the most money from various jobs	Joe Chen, Huang Bo, Wang Xun, Zhang Yixing; Wins
1/04	5 July 2015 (2 June 2015)	No guest	Chongming Island (Chongming County, Shanghai)	Island Survival Mindset; Single group			Prevent all bombs from detonating	Task Failed
1/05 (Note: Show was unable to participate. His role was filled by Guo Tao.)	12 July 2015 (18 June 2015)	Guo Tao	Chaotianmen (Yuzhong, Chongqing)	Crazy Stone 2 No Teams		Battle of Chaotianmen; Huang Lei, Zhang Yixing; Sun Honglei, Huang Bo; Wang Xun, Guo Tao	Form a two-person alliance and obtain the real jade stone	Wang Xun, Guo Tao; Wins
1/06	19 July 2015 (29 June 2015)	No guest	Daguan Park (Xishan, Kunming, Yunnan)	Move an Airplane; Single group	A Game of Cats and Mice; No Teams, Mice order: Sun Honglei, Show, Zhang Yixing, Wang Xun, Huang Bo, Huang Lei	Road To Lijiang; Train Team; Sun Honglei, Show; Coach Team; Wang Xun, Huang Bo; SUV Team; Huang Lei, Zhang Yixing	Cats to catch mice within limited time given per round for transportation to Lijiang	Zhang Yixing; Wins
1/07	26 July 2015 (1 July 2015)	Zhou Dongyu	Mount Satseto (Yulong County, Lijiang, Yunnan)	Ascend The Throne; No Teams		The Frozen Throne; No Teams	Time travel back to the Yan Dynasty and move up the imperial hierarchy, ascend the throne at the top of Jade Dragon Mountain.	Show; Wins
1/08	2 August 2015 (17 July 2015)	Chen Bolin	Qingdao, Shandong	Lost in Qingdao; Hostages; Huang Lei, Huang Bo; Rescuers; Sun Honglei, Wang Xun, Show, Zhang Yixing			Save the hostages from drowning	Task Passed
1/09	9 August 2015 (15 July 2015)	No guest	Alibaba Group (Xixiyuan Area)	The Career Competition; Intelligence Team; Sun Honglei, Wang Xun, Zhang Yixing; Stamina Team; Huang Bo, Huang Lei, Show			Get promoted to the position of CEO	Show; Wins
1/10	6 September 2015 (9 August 2015)	Xu Zheng; Director	Shanghai	Ice March; No Teams			Protect chosen block of ice from melting	Xu Zheng; Wins
1/11	13 September 2015 (29 July 2015)	No guest	Nanjing, Jiangsu	Parallel Universe Secret Agent; Policemen; Sun Honglei, Huang Lei; Traitor; Zhang Yixing; Citizens; Wang Xun, Huang Bo, Show			Steal all energy sources from the enemy to escape the parallel universe	Citizens; Win
1/12	20 September 2015 (11 August 2015)	No guest	Shanghai Exhibition Center; Shanghai Tower (Shanghai)	Break of Dawn; Mutant; Huang Lei; Humans; Sun Honglei, Zhang Yixing, Wang Xun, Huang Bo, Show			Avoid being bitten by the humans turned mutants	Task Failed
1/13 Special	5 October 2015 (31 July 2015)	Cast members from Lost in Hong Kong	Shenzhen	Ganshui Team; Zhang Yixing, Sun Honglei, Huang Bo, Huang Lei, Wang Xun, Show; Tianshui Team; Ying Jun, Xu Zheng, Xue, Qiong Dan, Can Sen, Lam Suet, Yuen King-dan, Sam Lee			Be the first team to complete 3 missions	Ganshui Team; Wins

=== Second Season ===
List of episodes in second season (episode 2/01 to 2/12)

Episode #	Broadcast Date (Filming Date)	Guest(s)	Landmark	Teams	Mission	Results
2/01	17 April 2016 (9 March 2016)	No guest	Expo Axis; Shanghai Science and Technology Museum (Pudong, Shanghai)	Together With You; Go Fighting Team; Zhang Yixing, Sun Honglei, Huang Bo, Huang Lei, Wang Xun, Show Luo	Rescue Planet Kepler's Dog Prince	Task Passed
2/02	24 April 2016 (11 March 2016)	Song Xiaobao; Yue Yunpeng; Joker Xue	Wuxi, Jiangsu	Fight Of The Three Kingdoms; Kingdom of Wei; Zhang Yixing, Show Luo, Xue Zhiqian; Kingdom of Shu; Sun Honglei, Huang Bo, Song Xiaobao; Kingdom of Wu; Wang Xun, Huang Lei, Yue Yunpeng	'Imprison' players by popping their balloons and defeat the other kingdoms	Kingdom of Wu; Wang Xun; Huang Lei; Yue Yunpeng; Wins
2/03	1 May 2016 (6 January 2016)	No guest	Shanghai (Hotel Carpark, Shanghai Hongqiao International Airport)	Let's Go To Hainan Island! No Teams	Walk to the airport with just 3000 steps, recorded with a pedometer	Huang Bo; Wins
2/04	8 May 2016 (8 January 2016)	No guest	Sanya	Happiness of 100RMB; Legends Of The Beach Team; Zhang Yixing, Huang Bo; Rhythm Of The Sea And Coconuts Team; Show Luo, Wang Xun; Relaxation Of The Mind And Body Team; Sun Honglei, Huang Lei	Complete chosen activities on a Hainan holiday with only 100 RMB	Rhythm Of The Sea And Coconuts Team; Luo Zhi Xiang; Wang Xun; Wins
2/05	15 May 2016 (16 April 2016)	Lin Chi-ling	St. John's University; Aletheia University (Taipei, Taiwan)	Men Over Flowers; No Teams	Reproduce Meteor Garden	Kate Wins
2/06	22 May 2016 (17 & 18 April 2016)	No guest	Kenting National Park, Taiwan	Longitudinal Race; Team Two Foxes; Zhang Yixing, Huang Lei; Team Pineapple; Show Luo, Huang Bo; Team Doubledumb; Sun Honglei, Wang Xun	Bike race around South Taiwan in 24 hours. The team that takes the shortest time wins.	Team Doubledumb; Sun Honglei; Wang Xun; Wins
2/07	29 May 2016 (25 April 2016)	No guest	Guangzhou, Guangdong	The Heirs 2 Team Tea; Zhang Yixing, Show Luo, Wang Xun; Team Porridge; Huang Lei, Huang Bo, Sun Honglei	Whoever opens the last case will receive all the gold bars	Wang Xun; Wins
2/08	5 June 2016 (27 April 2016)	No guest	Fantawild Theme Park	Protect Everyone's Smiles; Boonie Bears' Spies; Huang Lei, Show Luo; Tmall's Agents; Huang Bo, Sun Honglei, Zhang Yixing, Wang Xun	Find the spies and save the sunflowers	Huang Lei, Show Luo; Wins; Task Passed
2/09	12 June 2016 (10 May 2016)	No guest	Alibaba Group (Xixiyuan Area); Xixi National Wetland Park	The Hare and The Tortoise; Team Hare; Zhang Yixing, Show Luo, Huang Lei, Huang Bo; Team Tortoise; Sun Honglei, Wang Xun	Move by completing tasks and be the first team to reach the destination.	Sun Honglei, Wang Xun; Wins
2/10	19 June 2016 ()	Xie Na; Jiang Jinfu; Darren Wang	1933 Old Millfun; The Bund; Peace Hotel; Huaihai Road (Shanghai)	Dark War: Double Agents; Trophy Protectors; Sun Honglei (spy for the Chasers); Wang Xun, Zhang Yixing, Xie Na, Jiang Jinfu, Darren Wang; Trophy Chasers; Huang Bo (spy for the Protectors); Runyi Lei, Show Luo	Be the first team to obtain all 3 pieces of the trophy	Huang Bo; Wins
2/11	26 June 2016 ()	No guest	Xiamen (Gulangyu); Fujian (Riyuegu Hotsprings Resort)	Looking Back on Life; No Teams	Complete missions to stay as youthful as possible	Show Luo; Wins
2/12	3 July 2016 ()	Phoenix Legend; Jolin Tsai; JJ Lin; Harlem Yu	Expo Axis (Shanghai)	Ode to Joy: Charity Concert; No Teams	Tickets to the concert were free of charge. However, all attendees must donate at least six books.	Task Passed. The full concert was broadcast on 10 July 2016. Donated 30,000 books

=== Third Season ===
List of episodes in third season (episode 3/01 to 3/12)

Episode #	Broadcast Date (Filming Date)	Guest(s)	Landmark	Teams	Mission	Results
3/01	9 July 2017 (22 January 2017)	No guests	Shanghai (Jin Mao Tower)	The People Who Wake Up The City; No Teams	The person who reaches the final venue last will disappear from Go Fighting!	Huang Bo, Huang Lei, Show Luo, Wang Xun, Zhang Yixing; Wins
3/02 (Note: Huang Bo was unable to participate as he was directing a film.)	16 July 2017 (18 June 2017)	Sha Yi (沙溢), Darren Wang	Foshan Ancestral Temple (Foshan)	Crouching Tiger, Hidden Dragon; No Teams	Collect the most martial arts manuals and retrieve the golden bun to become the Grandmaster of the pugilist world.	Zhang Yixing Wins
3/03	23 July 2017 (20 June 2017)	Bosco Wong, Eric Tsang, Kingdom Yuen, Elvis Tsui	Hong Kong (Yau Ma Tei Fruit Market, Kowloon Public Library, Olympian City, Sky100, Hong Kong Coliseum, Hong Kong Polytechnic University)	An Influential Era; No Teams	Go around Hong Kong trying to claim the greatest number of famous locations.	Huang Lei, Bosco Wong Wins
3/04 (Note: Zhang Yixing was unable to participate due to CCTV Lunar New Year rehearsals.)	30 July 2017 (22 Jan 2017)	Lin Gengxin, Wang Zi Jian (王自健)	Base Contemporary Art Museum; Suzhou RunHua Global Center; Pan Gate (Suzhou)	Silent Witness; Attack order: Wang Xun→Lin Gengxin→Huang Lei→Wang Zijian→Huang Bo→Show→Wang Xun	Chase players and eliminate them by scanning their QR codes. Sun Honglei temporarily acted as the uncontrollable factor who could scan anyone.	Sun Honglei Wins; Sun is allowed to return to Go Fighting! after being wiped at the end of Episode 1.
3/05	6 August 2017 (15 July 2017)	Yao Chen, Lin Chi-ling, Wang Luodan, Jiang Yiyan, Zhang Xinyi (张歆艺)	Sanya	The Most Adorable Person: Part 1 Huang Lei, Wang Luodan; Huang Bo, Lin Chi-ling; Sun Honglei, Zhang Xinyi; Zhang Yixing, Yao Chen; Show Luo	Complete tasks to try and win the most points. The person with the fewest points will spend the night on a small island.	Huang Bo, Sun Honglei, Huang Lei, Show Luo, Wang Xun; Wins
3/06	13 August 2017 (16 July 2017)	Yao Chen, Lin Chi-ling, Wang Luodan, Jiang Yiyan, Zhang Xinyi (张歆艺)	Sanya	The Most Adorable Person: Part 2 No Teams	Complete missions to earn supplies for the local military.	Sun Honglei, Wang Luodan; Wins
3/07	20 August 2017 (18 July 2017)	Xia Yu	Jinsha Site Museum; Tomb of Wang Jian; Du Fu Thatched Cottage (Chengdu, Deyang); Sanxingdui (Guanghan)	Warriors from the Ancient Shu Kingdom; Prince of Shu's Residence; Sun Honglei, Huang Lei; Du Fu Thatched Cottage; Huang Bo, Xia Yu; Chinese Medicine Shop; Show Luo, Zhang Yixing; Traitor; Wang Xun	Discover Chinese mythology stories and prevent the holy flames from being extinguished.	Huang Bo, Sun Honglei, Huang Lei, Show Luo, Zhang Yixing; Wins
3/08	27 August 2017 (20 July 2017)	No guests	Huizhou	The Heirs 3: Prequel; No Teams	Engage in business and try to become the richest merchant shopkeeper.	Wang Xun; Wins
3/09	3 Sep 2017 (20 July 2017)	Sha Yi, Guo Tao, Song Xiaobao (宋小宝), Jackson Wang	Shanghai	The Longest Night; Guards; Sun Honglei, Huang Bo, Huang Lei, Show Luo, Wang Xun, Zhang Yixing; Chasers; Sha Yi, Guo Tao, Song Xiaobao, Jackson Wang	Escape the chasers and find out the true betrayer	Sun Honglei, Wang Xun, Huang Bo; Wins
Commencing from 3 Nov 2017, Season 3 will air on the Friday 22:00 slot
3/10	3 Nov 2017 (31 August 2017)	No guests	Harbin	Coming of Age; No teams	The six cast members 'time travel' back to the 80s and experience the lives of their parents.	No one Wins
3/11	10 Nov 2017 (2 August 2017)	Li Liqun (李立群), Liu Hua (as NPCs)	Ningbo, Zhejiang (Xiangshan Movie & Television Town)	Passerby X, Y and Z No Teams	Find six martial artists, choose one to inherit the position of leader of the pugilist world and defeat the evil mastermind.	All members Win
3/12	17 Nov 2017 ()	Han Xue (as host)	Shanghai	Business Partners; No teams	Attempt to sell their goods to an angel investor, who will allocate the members board positions based on time taken.	Huang Bo; Wins

=== Fourth Season ===
List of episodes in fourth season (episode 4/01 to 4/12)

Episode #	Broadcast Date (Filming Date)	Guest(s)	Landmark	Teams	Mission	Results
4/01	29 April 2018 (7 March 2018)	No guest	Chongming District, Shanghai	Knowledge is Fate: Part 1 No Teams	The six cast members 'time travel' back to the 1978 in an attempt to study Gaokao and balance up the hard labour of farming.	Sun and Wang Xun registered for the exam Wins
4/02	6 May 2018 (7 March 2018)	No guest	Chongming District, Shanghai	Knowledge is Fate: Part 2 No Teams	The six cast members 'time travel' back to the 1978 in an attempt to study Gaokao and balance up the hard labour of farming.	All members Win
4/03 (Note: Zhang Yixing was unable to participate.)	13 May 2018 ()	No guest	Anji, Zhejiang	A Life We Desired; No Teams	Collect the most apples while producing the least carbon emissions	No one Wins
4/04	20 May 2018 ()	No guest	Yueqing, Zhejiang	The Heirs 4: A Family in Wenzhou; No Teams	Engage in business and become the richest factory owner	Huang Lei; Wins
4/05	27 May 2018 ()	Little Shenyang	Shenzhen, Guangdong (Chinese University of Hong Kong)	2028 Brain Olympic Games; No Teams	Obtain the Dragon's Chip to win the game and determine if humans or AIs are smarter.	Huang Lei; Wins
4/06	3 June 2018 ()	No guest	Dongsheng Village, Guilin	Welcome to Dongsheng Village: Part 1 Huang Lei, Yang Tangliang; Huang Bo, Hou Yuanli; Sun Honglei, Yang Qibiao; Zhang Yixing, Yang Dongchao; Wang Xun, Yang Wei; Show Luo, Yang Longjin	The six cast members have a photography competition while taking care of "left-behind children" for three days.	No one Wins
4/07	10 June 2018 ()	No guest	Dongsheng Village, Guilin	Welcome to Dongsheng Village: Part 2 Huang Lei, Yang Tangliang; Huang Bo, Hou Yuanli; Sun Honglei, Yang Qibiao; Zhang Yixing, Yang Dongchao; Wang Xun, Yang Wei; Show Luo, Yang Longjin	The six cast members continue taking care of the "left-behind children", and set up a sports event for the children of the village.	No one Wins
4/08	17 June 2018 ()	No guest	Shekou, Shenzhen	Shenzhen Reform and Opening-up Re-establishment of Entrepreneurship Road; Huang Lei, Xu Meng; Huang Bo, Li Zhen; Sun Honglei, Luanyu; Wang Xun, Muchun; Show Luo, Fan Luying	Trade credit vouchers to obtain the highest average price in the third and fourth rounds.	Huang Lei; Wins
4/09	24 June 2018 ()	Midnight Library Reader Club	Deqing County, Zhejiang	The Isolated Castle; Huang Lei: Master Huang; Huang Bo: Professor Huang; Sun Honglei: Young Master Lei; Zhang Yixing: Mr. Zhang; Wang Xun: Lawyer Wang; Show Luo: Writer Luo	Find a way to get the painting out of the castle without alerting anyone.	All members Win
4/10	1 July 2018 ()	No guests	Shanghai	Experience a Night Labor Life; Huang Lei, Huang Bo; Sun Honglei, Wang Xun; Zhang Yixing, Show Luo	Experience a night working night jobs, and find people to accompany them to a fight club. The group who wins two rounds of balloon boxing in a row wins.	All members Win
4/11	8 July 2018 ()	Yu Hewei	Zhuhai, Guangdong	Carefree Island, A Nice Act; No Teams	Find Zhang Yixing on Carefree Island.	No one Wins
4/12	15 July 2018 ()	Yu Hewei	Zhuhai, Guangdong	Carefree Island: Beyond the Time; No Teams	Find Zhang Yixing and escape Carefree Island.	Huang Bo; Wins

=== Fifth Season ===
List of episodes in fifth season (episode 5/01 onwards)

Episode #	Broadcast Date (Filming Date)	Guest(s)	Landmark	Teams	Mission	Results
5/01	12 May 2019 (16 March 2019)	No guest	Shanghai	Shanghai New Fashion - Garbage Classification; Three Cups of Chicken Team; Huang Lei, Wang Xun, Zhang Yixing; Luo-Li Team; Show Luo, Dilraba Dilmurat; Erguotou Team; Yue Yunpeng, Lei Jiayin		Three Cups of Chicken Team; Wins
5/02	19 May 2019 (16 April 2019)	Song Xiaobao, Guo Degang	Wulong	Impression Wulong "Guardian Journey": Part 1 No Teams		Wang Xun, Lei Jiayin, Yue Yunpeng; Win
5/03	26 May 2019 (17 April 2019)	No guest	Wulong	Impression Wulong "Guardian Journey": Part 2 No Teams		No one Wins
5/04	2 June 2019 (26 April 2019)	No guest	Shanghai Haichang Ocean Park, Shanghai	Ocean World; Polar Bear; Huang Lei; Sea Lion; Jia Nailiang; Penguin; Show Luo, Dilraba Dilmurat; Jellyfish; Zhang Yixing, Wang Xun, Yue Yunpeng		Dilraba Dilmurat; Wins
5/05	9 June 2019 (14 May 2019)	Dong Chengpeng	Yangzhou	Rat Hero; No Teams		Yue Yunpeng; Wins
5/06	16 June 2019 (16 May 2019)	No guest	Wuhan	Wuhan Treasure; No Teams		Zhang Yixing; Wins
5/07	23 June 2019 (24 April 2019)	Zhang Yunlei	Chongqing	Scented Hot Pot; True Successor; Dilraba Dilmurat; Strings; Show Luo, Yue Yunpeng; Civilians; Zhang Yixing, Jia Nailiang, Wang Xun		Strings; Wins
5/08	30 June 2019 (12 June 2019)	Sun Honglei	Shanghai	Helping Farmers to Enjoy; No Teams		

=== Sixth Season ===
List of episodes in sixth season (episode 6/01 onwards)

Episode #	Broadcast Date (Filming Date)	Guest(s)	Landmark	Teams	Mission	Results
6/01	10 May 2020 ()	No guest	Shanghai	- Hot Pot Team; Zhang Yixing, Wang Xun, Yue Yunpeng, Dilraba Dilmurat; Sauna Team; Jia Nailiang, Lei Jiayin, Deng Lun	The Hot Pot Team complete team activities in the sauna and the Sauna Team complete team activities in a hot pot restaurant. They fulfilled wishes of civilians during the pandemic.	Both Teams; Wins
