= Kispa (detergent) =

Chinese laundry detergent brand

Kispa Detergent
- Product type: Heavy-duty synthetic detergent
- Current owner: Guangzhou Liby Enterprise
- Country: China
- Markets: United States, Canada, Europe, Latin America, India, Israel, Morocco, Philippines, Saudi Arabia, Turkey, Vietnam

Kispa (Chinese: 好爸爸Kispa) is a laundry detergent brand manufactured by Guangzhou Liby Enterprise Group Co Ltd. The brand was established and introduced in China. Along with Liby, Superb, Xilan and Vewin under Guangzhou Liby Enterprise, Kispa is considered among the high-end brands of detergent in China.

== Naming ==
The brand Kispa initially only had a Chinese name. Kispa was originally named as "去渍霸". However, in 2014, the brand underwent a name rebranding. From the original "去渍霸", the brand changed its name to the current "好爸爸Kispa". The current Chinese name led the brand to adopt an English name which is "Kispa".

== Background ==
Product line of Kispa is designed to be combined with components from the international chemical giants BASF and Novozymes. Products are co-developed in terms of the formula technology and raw materials, and the traditional washing technology has been reformed. The world's largest chemical company BASF provides surfactant while the world's largest enzyme producer, Novozymes provides Kispa the Macromolecule Organic Additives for Silicone.

== Sponsorship ==
In 2008, Kispa was one of the sponsors for the 2008 Beijing Olympic Games. The brand was designated to provide cleaning supplies for athletes participating in the Olympic Games. Over 16,000 athletes, coaches and team officials from more than 200 countries and regions used cleaning products from Kispa during their stay in Beijing.

The brand is the title sponsor of the Chinese variety show, Where Are We Going, Dad?. Sponsorship for the variety show led to a survey which showed that an increase of a 20% audience are now acquainted with the brand and would consider a purchase. Kispa is also one of the few official sponsors for top Chinese variety show, Go Fighting!.

Since 2012, the promotional spokesman for Kispa is Chinese celebrity, Huang Lei who is the cast member for both variety shows, Where Are We Going, Dad? and Go Fighting!.
