= Where Are We Going, Dad? =

Where Are We Going, Dad? may refer to:

- Where Are We Going, Dad? (TV series)
- Where Are We Going, Dad? (film)
  - Where Are We Going, Dad? 2, 2015 sequel to the first film

== See also ==
- Dad! Where Are We Going?, South Korean TV series on which the Chinese show is based
