= Korean variety show =

Subgenre of variety show from South Korea

Korean variety shows are a form of television entertainment in South Korea. Variety shows were developed in 19th century Europe and the United States, and adapted from stage to television in the 20th century. In the late 20th and 21st centuries, variety shows decreased in popularity in Europe and the US. The variety show format was exported to Asia from Europe and the United States, and became popular in South Korea. Variety shows are currently a major part of television entertainment in South Korea. They are usually composed of various stunts, performances, skits, quizzes, comedy acts, etc. Popular celebrities and K-pop idols are also featured on Korean variety shows.

== History of Korean variety shows ==
=== Background ===
Television was first introduced to South Korea in the late 1950s, and the first South Korean television broadcasting station was created in 1956. Television was used for entertainment, but also by the government to promote desired values, and the dissemination of other forms of propaganda.

In the 1970s and 1980s, the government increased their control over the media in South Korea, including television broadcasting. President Park Chung-hee's declaration of martial law after the South Korean election of 1971, and his subsequent revision of the Korean constitution into the Yushin Constitution, created a highly authoritarian government which centered power in the hands of the president. This required all television content creators to review their programs in accordance with governmental restrictions. After the breakdown of the Fourth Republic of Korea and the Fifth Republic of Korea, reforms were made, although relative freedom of the press and media was not established until the 1989 Act on Registration of Periodicals and the Broadcast Act.

In 1998, the International Monetary Fund (IMF) crisis in South Korea prompted fears around the collapse of the traditional family and social systems, and media shifted to reflect those desired values and to raise public awareness of everyday life. While television during the Park Chung-hee military regime focused on enlightenment, television began to shift towards focusing on personal and emotional subjects around 1998, as well as entertainment that promoted comfort and fun. It was said that "the television program crews who accurately grasp the demand of the public will concentrate their efforts on the television show program, which includes a 'fantastic element' that will tackle personal everyday life and break down the boundaries between inside and outside the broadcast". Cable channels and satellite broadcasting were also introduced in the 1990s, with cable channels reaching over 15 million viewers by 2010.

=== History of variety shows ===
Korean television has broadcast music-oriented programs and performances since the creation of broadcast stations in the early 1960s. These music programs involve singing, dancing, playing instruments, and other forms of artistry, usually as part of a competition or talent show. One such program is KBS1's National Singing Contest, which has aired since 1980, making it Korea's longest-running television program.

In the 1990s and 2000s, entertainment centered around talk shows and confrontation. Examples of similar Korean reality-variety shows include g.o.d's Baby Diaries and Happy Sunday. However, because of the limitations in material and format, this type of show has generally not continued into the modern day, except for some representative programs.

The combination of talk show and confrontation entertainment became a signatory program of each broadcasting company such as Happy Together Season 3, Running Man, Radio Star, and Infinite Challenge which ended in summer 2018.

In the early and mid-2010s, styles of variety shows favored "love variety" and "audition" formats. Unlike the confrontational and scripted style of previous shows, many programs invoked human elements and emotions, although there were controversies over the legitimacy of the supposedly unscripted events. This type of Korean variety show gained popularity because "it strikes chords in both human instinct and happiness and is not just a simple 'entertainer personal show', which is considered to be the limit of existing confrontation entertainment, by adding various fun factors centering on the psychological changes of entertainers and ordinary people".

== Characteristics ==
Korean variety shows form a large part of modern television entertainment in South Korea.

Korean variety combines human emotional elements with various entertainment formats that have flowed based on talk shows and confrontational entertainment in the 90s. "Observation entertainment" or "real entertainment" has emerged and is matching the public's taste. However, entertainment has recently attracted the public's attention as a kind of social phenomenon as it has developed into the form and style of Korean entertainment. It is not merely an entertainment program that attracts an enthusiastic response from the public.

Korean variety shows do not have a fixed format but combine various television genres such as dramas, documentaries, and information programs. As material for the entertainment programs, the public's daily life is actively utilized. The story of events or characters is combined with the basic storytelling of the main event, and the entertainment program is enriched.

== Trends ==
=== Pilot programs ===
A pilot program is a program that determines television regular programming based on viewer responses with a trial production and a test broadcast. Before the program becomes a regular program, the test program is produced in the format designed by the production team. When it is broadcast, the producers determine the reaction of viewers, and if the response is good, it will go into production to produce programs for regular broadcasting.

Since the mid-2010s, Korean entertainment programs usually begin with a pilot program. After reviewing the reaction of viewers, the program's format often changes and the premise of the show becomes more concrete. These programs do not end with a single broadcast, but attempt to determine the audience's taste and change to fit the audience. The reason for producing pilot programs in Korean broadcasting is simple: no matter how carefully broadcasters plan, no one knows the fate of the program until it is broadcast. It is a natural procedure for broadcasters to research the public's reaction to a program before they pay the huge production costs associated with a series.

=== Observational variety shows ===
Observational entertainment shows the habits and thoughts of entertainers in everyday life, as well as their mistakes. It gives the audience an insight into their personalities rather than their talents. It is not that there was no real entertainment in Korea in the past, however, mobile has had a big impact on the emergence of various types of reality entertainment. Since the spread of smartphones in the late 2000s, the Korean public has begun to concentrate on viewing mobile content rather than terrestrial and cable. In particular, MCN has expanded its influence to the extent that it threatens existing broadcasting by actively approaching and describing life or interested information that individuals want along with information transmission through interactive communication. Since the popularity of tvN content such as Three Meals a Day, which has a big MCN character in the existing broadcasting type, and Youn's Kitchen, and New Journey to the West have become more popular.

The beginning of Korea's full-scale observational entertainment is MBC TV's I Live Alone. I Live Alone uses the format of observing the daily life of stars who live alone. And in August, SBS TV Ugly Our Baby appeared. Initially, it was pointed out that it copied I Live Alone, but Ugly Baby was a variation of I Live Alone. The concept of observing the life of entertainers is the same, but the performers are limited to male entertainers and their mothers appear as observers. As the program's ratings exceeded 20%, the trend of observation entertainment is accelerating.

=== Music audition shows ===
Recently, Korean entertainment programs have been losing popularity; however, audition programs have been loved for quite some time and are still enjoyed by many viewers. In a country with a population of 50 million, a record of two million people participated in a program's preliminary auditions for the 2012 edition of Superstar K Season 4 (Mnet). When Superstar K came out, each broadcaster with an audition program experienced the same or slightly different audition trend at the same time. Several examples include: the survival audition for K Pop Star (SBS), and Voice Korea (Mnet).

=== Dating and relationship shows ===
This category includes programs such as We Got Married, Heart Signal, etc. Recently, the category has been popular with viewers, which has not gone unnoticed by broadcasters. In the 2020s, love variety programs featuring ordinary people began to flourish. TV programs include I'm Solo, Single's Inferno, and so on. In addition, a love variety program aired through various over-the-top media service was also very popular. Examples include TVING's EXchange and Kakao TV's Change Days. The love variety programs were so popular that they were made into a series.

=== Food shows ===
==== Mukbang ====
Mukbang has already become popular content for broadcasting companies and Internet broadcasters. According to a survey, 65 percent of respondents said that these shows are their favorite TV or online programs.

The real "eating broadcast", which only has scenes of people sitting and eating food, has begun to appear on one-person broadcasts such as AfreecaTV. The Internet audience began to grow to see BJ in an online streamer eating food, and the word mukbang (a host eats food and interacts with an audience) was coined. There were many programs, such as Tasty Roads and Wednesday Food Talk.

==== Cook-bang ====
In the past, most of the Korean cooking programs were life information programs where cooking experts and cooking researchers appeared alone and taught cooking. It was programing clearly aimed at Korean housewives. But cook-bang is different. Most of these shows are in the form of entertainment. There are programs where different chefs compete and tell the story of winning through fair competition. An example is Please Take Care of My Refrigerator. There is a cooking room with a story of relaxation, co-prosperity and empathy in Mr. Baek's Home Recipe (집밥 백선생).

== Globalization of Korean variety shows ==
=== Globalized variety shows ===
==== Major Korean entertainment programs ====
===== Running Man =====
Recently, the broadcasting of Korean content has been widely expanded to China, Japan, Southeast Asia, North America, Latin America, and Europe. It has diversified and subdivided from drama, K-pop center to entertainment programs, movies, animations, games, publications and character products. Korean entertainment program Running Man is a TV entertainment program that is exported to China and Southeast Asia and is gaining popularity. Through the popularity of Running Man, groups of fans are forming, and its members are holding meetings and also making related product purchases. Running Man is gaining popularity with Chinese viewers with its novel planning, high-quality scripts, outdoor shooting, and realistic material. Thanks to the popularity of Running Man, the Korean Wave (Shin) (popularity of Korean culture) has begun to grow again. Through entertainment programs such as Running Man, various Korean tourist attractions were exposed to the TV viewer, which promoted them. As a result, Chinese tourists visited Korea and experienced various sights shown in these entertainment programs. The Korean Wave entertainment program Running Man attracts tourists to Korea and potentially affects the tourism industry. Foreign tourists have become interested in various aspects of Korean culture, such as food, fashion, and shopping through the new perspective shown on Running Man.

===== King of Mask Singer =====
MBC's mystery music show King of Mask Singer is a survival contest program that has been popular since it first aired in 2015 and has been exported to over 30 countries as the Masked Singer franchise. In the King of Mask Singer, participants wear masks to prevent prejudices so the winner is chosen only for their talents as a singer. All matches are judged by the audience and the celebrity judges, and the defeated competitors take off their mask and reveal their identity.

In MBC's original format, a winner is selected after a total of three rounds of singing competitions. These are in the form of a tournament divided into two groups. The winner of the show does not remove their mask to reveal their identity and will not be revealed until they are defeated in the competition. Unlike many other reality contest programs, when the mask is removed and the contestant's hidden identity is revealed, it is a big moment. Even if a contestant drops out in the first round, they often get more attention than the winner even though their singing abilities are weaker. Compared to other similar survival contest programs such as I Am a Singer or An Immortal Masterpiece, the performers on King of Mask Singer are relatively less burdened by victory or their ranking, which is why celebrities in various fields are easily featured. Viewers' response to the program is also positive, so this format is expected to continue to be popular for the time being.

===== The Return of Superman =====
The Korean family-style entertainment program The Return of Superman, is based on familiar and realistic contexts for all ages, and it naturally injects and reproduces the universal emotions of Korean society and strengthens them at the same time. In the end, television entertainment programs can be used as a very effective means of universalizing the ideology of a society. The authoritative father in the traditional patriarchal system, which has been influenced by Confucianism, has actively produced images of fathers who want to escape the ideology of dominant gender roles devoted only to social life and economic activities in the public sphere. At the same time, these programs reinforce the inconsistency of such images and regenerate traditional gender ideology.

==== Export of Korean entertainment ====
The first case where a Korean broadcasting company exported a TV program was in 2003 when KBS sold Dojeon Golden Bell to Chinese CCTV. However, since Dojeon Golden Bell, most Korean broadcasters' format exports have been dramas that have been popular in Southeast Asia. However, things have changed since 2011. Along with the dramas, entertainment programs from Korean broadcasters have begun to be exported. In addition to exports, there have been cases of local success based on key formatting elements such as the way Korean programs are produced and their storyline. A major example is MBC's Where Are We Going Dad? program, which was imported by Hounan Satellite TV in 2013. It was produced in China in 2013 and has a viewer rating of over five percent in China, which is considered a success. Based on this success, it is said that price of the program Where Are We Going Dad? Season 2 has increased by about 10 times. In addition, major music contests have been exported to China, including MBC's I Am a Singer, SBS's K-Pop Star, CJ E&M's Superstar K and JTBC's Hidden Singer. Then, in September 2014, four senior envoys and a young porter's overseas travel story format sold to NBC. In addition, CJ E&M's The Genius has been exported to Western countries such as the Netherlands and France, and SBS's Running Man has started co-production with China's Zhejiang TV.

=== Changes due to globalization ===
Korean television has been functioning as a medium for transplanting, reproducing and consuming multicultural discourses through programs of various genres. Korean entertainment programs have introduced foreigners, globalization and multicultural society, and this tendency is continuously expanding in response to public opinion. In a society like Korea's where everyday contact with foreign migrants is uncommon, media is a key way to transplant and produce multicultural discourses and acts as a strong mechanism to form awareness among different members of society. Various Korean media are broadcasting programs in which foreigners appear that depict globalization and a multicultural society. Although there were occasional programs that foreigners had previously appeared in, recent programs have increased their numbers compared to the past, and their roles are expanding to introduce the unique perspectives of migrants on various cross-sections of Korean society.
