= Woolong =

Woolong may refer to:

- Wulong District, a district of Chongqing Municipality, China
- Woolong, a fictional currency used in science fiction anime television series Cowboy Bebop, Space Dandy and Carole & Tuesday

== See also ==
- Wolong (disambiguation)
- Wollongong, New South Wales, Australia
