= Royal Treasure =

- Poster
- Traditional Chinese: 極限挑戰之皇家寶藏
- Simplified Chinese: 极限挑战之皇家宝藏
- Hanyu Pinyin: Jíxiàn Tiǎozhàn Zhī Huángjiā Bǎozàng
- Directed by: Yan Min; Ren Jing
- Written by: Shu Huan
- Starring: Huang Bo; Sun Honglei; Huang Lei; Show Lo; Wang Xun; Lay Zhang; Zanilia Zhao; Yu He Wei
- Cinematography: Chen Dan
- Production companies: SMG; Dragon TV; Nanjing Dadaoxingzhi Culture Media Co., Ltd. Beijing Xinbaoyuan Film and TV Culture Investment Co., LTD. Beijing Motianlun Culture Media Co., Ltd. Hangzhou Heima Film and TV Culture Co., LTD.
- Distributed by: iQiyi
- Release date: 15 January 2016
- Running time: 102 minutes
- Country: China
- Language: Mandarin
- Box office: CN¥125.4 million (China)

Royal Treasure (Chinese: 极限挑战之皇家宝藏) is a 2016 Chinese comedy-thriller film spun off from the variety show Go Fighting!. Directed by Yan Min and Ren Jing, it stars Huang Bo, Sun Honglei, Huang Lei, Show Lo, Wang Xun, Lay Zhang, Zanilia Zhao and Yu Hewei. It was released in China on January 15, 2016.

== Plot ==
Huang Bo, Sun Honglei, Huang Lei, Show Lo, Wang Xun and Lay Zhang are filming the variety show Go Fighting! when a meteoroid suddenly strikes them, sending them back in time to the Ming dynasty (1368–1644). They meet the emperor, and just before his death, he leaves the legacy of the Order of the Holy Flame to them. They then return to the modern civilization and begin their journey of searching for the royal treasure.

== Cast ==
- Huang Bo as himself
- Sun Honglei as himself
- Huang Lei as himself
- Show Lo as himself
- Wang Xun as himself
- Lay Zhang as himself
- Zanilia Zhao as the Ming dynasty princess
- Yu Hewei as the Ming dynasty emperor.

== Production ==
This film was shot in Heshun Town of Tengchong, Yunnan.

== Music ==
The lyrics of A Man's Job (《男人的事》) were written by Wang Zhengyu and Wen Ya, the tune by Peng Fei. It is sung here by Huang Bo, Sun Honglei, Huang Lei, Show Lo, Wang Xun and Lay Zhang. It was reused as a theme song for Season 2 of Go Fighting!.

== Release ==
The film was released on January 15, 2015, in China.

== Box office ==
The film took ¥30.994 million in its first day and ¥77.1 million in its first week. It grossed a total of CN¥125.4 million in China.
