= Suzhou Xindi Center =

Skyscraper in Suzhou, China

General information
- Status: Completed
- Type: Mixed use (residential, hotel, and office)
- Location: Suzhou, Jiangsu, China
- Address: Sishan Road
- Coordinates: 31.2947328°N 120.5544513°E
- Completed: 2005

Height
- Architectural: 232 m (761 ft)
- Antenna spire: 232 m (761.2 ft)
- Roof: 211.2 m (693 ft)

Technical details
- Floor count: 54

Suzhou Xindi Center (also known as Suzhou International Commerce City West Tower) is a 54-floor, 232 metres (761 feet) tall skyscraper completed in 2005 located in Suzhou, Jiangsu, China. Upon its completion, it became the tallest building in Suzhou and the tallest building in Jiangsu, until it was surpassed by the 282 m (925 ft) tall Suzhou RunHua Global Center Tower 1 in 2010.

On March 26, 2007, Shangri-La Hotels and Resorts opened its hotel in the building.

== See also ==
- List of tallest buildings in the world
