= Wang Xun (actor) =

Chinese actor

- Born: 27 November 1974 (age 51); Wuhou, Sichuan, China
- Occupations: Actor, screenwriter, director
- Years active: 1992–present

Wang Xun (Chinese: 王迅; born 27 November 1974) is a Chinese actor, screenwriter and director.

== Early life ==
He was born in Wuhou district in Sichuan and is the Secretary General of Political and Legal Circles of Sichuan Youth Federation, member of the Chengdu Youth Federation, Sichuan Artists Association, and the Vice Chairman of the Chengdu Artists Association. Before establishing his career in the entertainment industry, he was a soldier.

== Career ==
=== 1992–2004: Humble beginnings ===
He was apprentice to multiple established figures in the entertainment world including Chen Fa (沈伐) and Yang Ziyang (杨紫阳) where he learned acting and starred in small screens in various television stations.

=== 2006–2011: Career advancement ===
In 2006, he starred in his first big screen movie, Crazy Stone directed by Ning Hao. He garnered more exposure after this role. He starred in Big Movie alongside Huang Bo and Yao Chen later that year.

In 2007 and 2008, he focused on his career as a screenwriter at CCTV and created the screenwriting for CCTV Spring Gala, and many other small screen shows.

He was inducted for a role in Ning Hao's film in 2009, Crazy Racer where his acting received praise from the director. Later in 2009, he starred in his first drama, My Chief and My Regiment and Non-Local Person. He was cast in Mountain Army and was the supporting role in One Night in Supermarket.

In 2011, he was injured during an explosion scene in the drama which he starred in, Fight Till the End.

=== 2012–present: HB Studio and continuous popularity ===
He signed under Huang Bo Studios (黄渤工作室) in 2012. In 2012, he took a supporting role in A Unique Militiaman and Design of Death where he contributed his services to the cast as a Sichuan dialect teacher in the latter. Huang Bo invited Wang Xun to star in the film the former directed himself, Special Service. Apart from acting, Wang Xun contributed in the screenwriting and producing of the film which made him gain the epithet of a "technical talent". The film would later garner the "Best Online Film of the Year" award at the Shanghai International Film Festival.

In 2013, he starred in The Chef, The Actor, The Scoundrel alongside Huang Bo, Liu Ye and Zhang Hanyu. The trio would later collaborate again in the drama Fire Line, Three Brothers. Wang Xun co-starred with Lin Chi-ling and Huang Bo in 101st Marriage Proposal. In late 2013, the drama, 10 Farewells to the Red Army which he starred in was broadcast on CCTV1.

In 2014, he was starred as the supporting cast of the film, The Red and drama, Sharp Blade. He made an appearance in the third season of Wonder Lady.

In 2015, he was the cast for the drama, WangDaHua. Xu Zheng would later recruit him to star in the film the former directed himself, Lost in Hong Kong. The film was a commercial success in China. His popularity surged further with his partaking in the popular variety game show, Go Fighting! alongside Zhang Yixing, Show Lo, Huang Bo, Huang Lei and Sun Honglei.

In 2016, he starred in Dongbei History, So Lucky and Royal Treasure with Go Fighting! cast members. He was announced in December to be starring in Some Like It Hot. In 2017, he starred in What A Wonderful Family alongside cast member Huang Lei.

== Awards ==
Wang Xun won Best Asian Actor the New Vision International Film Festival Awards in 2019.

== Filmography ==
=== Films ===
Title		Year
Crazy Stone	疯狂的石头	2006
Big Movie	大电影之数百亿	2006
Two Stupid Eggs	大电影之 两个傻瓜的荒唐事	2007
Soul of the Ultimate Nation	奇迹世界	2007
One Night in Supermarket	夜店	2009
Ma Dong's Holiday	马东的假期	2009
Crazy Racer	疯狂的赛车	2009
Bright Future	大有前途	2009
wing under the wings	翅膀下的风	2010
Stronger	坚强	2010
Love Flower	爱上油菜花	2010
Special Service	特殊服务	2012
The Chef, The Actor, The Scoundrel	厨子戏子痞子	2013
101st Marriage Proposal	101次求婚	2013
The Red	红色	2014
Lost in Hong Kong	港囧	2015
Dongbei History	东北往事之破马张飞	2016
So Lucky	杠上开花	2016
Royal Treasure	极限挑战之皇家宝藏	2016
Some Like It Hot	情圣	2016
What A Wonderful Family	麻烦家族	2017
Kill Me Please	这就是命	2017
Detective Chinatown 2	唐人街探案II	2018
The Big Shot		2019
Desire Game		2019
Bye! Mr. Wang		2019
The Last Judgement		2019
Never Say Never	八角笼中	2023

=== Television series ===
Title		Year
My Chief and My Regiment	我的团长我的团	2009
Non-Local Person	外乡人	2009
Mountain Army	山城棒棒军II	2009
A Unique Militiman	民兵葛二蛋	2012
Fire Line, Three Brothers	火线三兄弟	2013
10 Farewells to the Red Army	十送红军	2013
WangDaHua	王大花的革命生涯	2015

=== Variety shows ===
Title		Year
The Jin Xing Show	金星秀	2015
Lok Street	喜乐街第二季	2015
Go Fighting! (Season 1, 2, 3)	极限挑战 (第一，二，三，四季)	2015, 2016, 2017,2018
