= Wang Hui-ling =

Taiwanese screenwriter

- Born: Taipei, Taiwan
- Occupation: Screenwriter
- Known for: Crouching Tiger, Hidden Dragon (co-writer); Lust, Caution (co-writer)

Wang Hui-ling (Chinese: 王蕙玲; pinyin: Wáng Huìlíng) is a Taiwanese screenwriter. In 2001 she was nominated for Academy Award for Best Adapted Screenplay for the Crouching Tiger, Hidden Dragon. In 2014, she wrote the script for The Crossing directed by John Woo.

== Early life and education ==
Hui-Ling was born in Taipei, Taiwan. She graduated from Taipei College of Education.

== Career ==
Hui-Ling started her career with co-writing the script of Eat Drink Man Woman with director Ang Lee and James Schamus.

In 2007 she co-wrote the erotic thriller film Lust, Caution again with James Schamus and directed by Ang Lee.

In 2013 wrote the script for an epic The Crossing directed by John Woo that filmed in Beijing.

== Filmography ==
=== Films ===
- Eat Drink Man Woman (1994)
- Crouching Tiger, Hidden Dragon (2000)
- Fleeing by Night (2000)
- Tortilla Soup (2001) story
- Migratory Bird (2001)
- The Myth (2005)
- Lust, Caution (2007) also acted as Liao Tai Tai
- The Crossing (2014)
- The Crossing 2 (2015)
- Legend of the Demon Cat (2017)

=== TV ===
- April Rhapsody (2000)
- The Legend of Eileen Chang (2004)
- Thank You for Having Loved Me (2007)
