= One Step Away =

- Film poster
- Directed by: Zhao Baogang
- Written by: Ren Baoru; Gao Xuan
- Produced by: Liu Jianhua; Ren Zhonglun
- Starring: Sun Honglei; Gwei Lun-mei; Alex Fong; Xu Jinglei; Huang Lei
- Cinematography: Arthur Wong
- Edited by: Derek Hui
- Music by: Shigeru Umebayashi
- Production companies: Shanghai Film Group Co., Ltd; China Film Group Corporation
- Release date: September 19, 2014 (China)
- Running time: 100 minutes
- Country: China
- Language: Mandarin
- Box office: ¥69.87 million (China)

One Step Away (Chinese: 觸不可及) is a 2014 Chinese suspense romance film directed by Zhao Baogang. It was released on September 19, 2014.

== Cast ==
- Sun Honglei
- Gwei Lun-mei
- Alex Fong
- Xu Jinglei
- Huang Lei
- Jiang Qinqin
- Ada Choi
- Xi Meijuan
- Fang Jun
- Duanmu Chonghui
- Li Hua
- Tan Kai

== Theme song ==
- "Ai Bu Ke Ji" (爱不可及)
  - Lyrics: Lin Xi
  - Music: Zhang Yadong
  - Singer: Faye Wong

== Reception ==
By September 28, it had earned ¥69.87 million at the Chinese box office.
