= Where Are We Going, Dad? (film) =

- Film poster
- Directed by: Xie Dikui; Lin Yan
- Written by: Wang Haifeng; Ya Xiao
- Based on: Where Are We Going, Dad?
- Produced by: Zhou Xiong
- Production company: Beijing Enlight Pictures
- Release date: January 31, 2014 (China)
- Running time: 95 minutes
- Country: China
- Language: Mandarin
- Box office: RMB685.67 million (US$111.87 million)

Where Are We Going, Dad? (Chinese: 爸爸去哪儿; pinyin: Ba ba qu na er) is a 2014 Chinese children's film based on a television reality show of the same name. A second film, Where Are We Going, Dad? 2, was released on February 19, 2015.

== Reception ==
The film grossed RMB88.2 million (US$14.6 million) in its opening day, a record for a non-3D Chinese film at the Chinese box office. Its record breaking even caught the attention of the BBC and the LA Times. It grossed RMB308.91 million (US$50.97 million) in the first four days.
