= April Rhapsody =

- DVD cover
- Traditional Chinese: 人間四月天
- Simplified Chinese: 人间四月天
- Literal meaning: April in This World
- Hanyu Pinyin: Rénjiān Sìyuè Tiān
- Written by: Wang Hui-ling
- Starring: Huang Lei; Rene Liu; Zhou Xun; Annie Yi
- Countries of origin: Taiwan; China
- Original languages: Mandarin, English
- No. of episodes: 20

Production
- Running time: 45 minutes

Original release
- Network: TTV; PTS; CCTV; ATV
- Release: January 10 – January 16, 2000

April Rhapsody is a 2000 TV series written by Wang Hui-ling, based on the romantic life of Xu Zhimo, one of China's most renowned poets in the 20th century.

Virtually all characters in the story are historical, but the plot deviates from history somewhat. After the series' broadcast, historian Liang Congjie blasted the show and denied his mother Lin Huiyin's relationship with Xu was anything other than platonic.

== Cast ==
=== Main ===
- Huang Lei as Xu Zhimo
- Rene Liu as Zhang Youyi (Chang Yu-i), Xu Zhimo's first wife
- Zhou Xun as Lin Huiyin, Xu Zhimo's close female friend
- Annie Yi as Lu Xiaoman, Xu Zhimo's illicit lover who became his second wife

=== Supporting ===
- Zhou Zheng as Xu Zhimo's father
- Mou Yun as Xu Zhimo's mother
- Li Jian as Amah in Xu household
- Sun Bin as Shen Shuwei, Xu Zhimo's cousin
- Wang Gui'e as Lin Huiyin's mother
- Wu Jun as Liang Sicheng, Lin Huiyin's husband
- Sihung Lung as Liang Qichao, Liang Sicheng's father
- Guo Chunxiang as Liang Sicheng's mother
- Ma Yue as Wang Geng, Lu Xiaoman's husband
- Wang Ban as Carsun Chang, Zhang Youyi's brother
- Tien Peng as Chang Kia-ngau, Zhang Youyi's brother
- Li Liansheng as Zhang Youyi's father
- Zhao Xiaonan as Zhang Youyi's mother
- Feng Lei as Weng Ruiwu, Lu Xiaoman's lover
- Shao Wanlin as Lu Xiaoman's father
- Gao Fang as Lu Xiaoman's mother
- Li Jie as Shen Congwen
- Li Hongwei as Jin Yuelin
- Ma Jie as Hu Shih
