= Lin Yan =

Chinese actor (born 1982)

- 林妍
- Born: May 17, 1982 (age 44); Beijing, China
- Education: Beijing Film Academy
- Occupation: Director
- Known for: Where Are We Going, Dad?; Growing Up, Loser Diary; Hello Joan, My! PE Teacher; Fireworks Family
- Awards: The 1st Chuxin List "China's Top Ten Young TV Drama Directors" Award The 14th China-US TV Festival Golden Angel Award for Best New Director of the Year

Lin Yan (born 1982) is a Chinese television and film director from Beijing and a graduate of the Beijing Film Academy. After early work as an executive director, mainly with Teng Huatao, she made her solo directorial debut in 2014. She has since directed several successful dramas, including Where Are We Going, Dad?, Grow Up, My PE Teacher, She and Her Perfect Husband, and The Islands. Lin Yan has received multiple awards, including the Golden Angel Award for Best New Director.

== Early life and career ==
Lin Yan, Han Chinese, was born in Beijing. She is a director from mainland China and a graduate of the Directing Department of Beijing Film Academy.

=== 1990s and 2000s ===
She had been working in the industry since the 1990s and had assumed leading roles in 2007 while working for director Teng Huatao (滕华涛) until 2014.

=== Directorial debut (2014) ===
Her first film directed independently was 0.5 Diors (屌丝日记), and she worked on the reality series Where Are We Going, Dad? (爸爸去哪儿).

== Career ==
In the 1990s, Lin Yan was admitted to the Directing Department of the Beijing Film Academy, where she studied under directors Xie Fei (谢飞) and Xie Xiaojing (谢晓晶). During her time at the Beijing Film Academy, she was able to work on a TV series called The Phantom Lover (夜半歌声), which was directed by Huang Lei (黄磊).

Graduating in 2002 from said academy, she began working for director Guan Hu (管虎) on the drama mystery series Winter Solstice (冬至).

Shortly afterwards, she began working under director Teng, with whom she produced numerous productions, including but not limited to the family drama Double-Sided Tape (双面胶, no known official translation) in 2007 the urban drama Dwelling Narrowness (蜗居) in 2009, a book adaptation Wang Gui & Anna (王贵与安娜) in the same year, the family drama What a Family (《瞧这一家子, no known official translation) in 2010, Love Is Not Blind (失恋33天) in 2011, Modern Editress (时尚女编辑, unknown official translation) in 2012, and the drama series Waves (浮沉, unknown official translation) in the same year.

In the same year, Lin began solo-directing, debuting with the drama series 0.5 Diors (屌丝日记, unknown official translation) that was released the following year. She went on to direct the drama Where Are We Going, Dad? (爸爸去哪儿) with Xie Di Kui (谢涤葵), broadcast on Hunan TV in 2014.

In 2015, she directed the youth drama Grow Up (长大), which was adapted from a novel written online by a user called "zhuzhu6P". It later won the 11th Television Production Industry "Outstanding TV Drama" Award.

During the same year, she co-directed the sequel to Where Are We Going, Dad? (爸爸去哪儿2). She followed this work up with a drama series (我为儿孙当北漂) or Wo wei er sun dang bei piao), featuring Yin Tao (殷桃), Tu Song Yan (涂松岩), and Tong Sheng Hang (韩童生), which premiered April 2015.

In 2016, she directed a drama series called My! Physical Education Teacher (我的！体育老师). It tells a story of a young woman falling in love with a middle-aged teacher that already has a teenage girl and young boy. Later on, she won the Best New Director Award at the 14th China-US Television Festival Golden Angel Awards for this drama. On July 7, she was able to premiere an emotional drama called Hello, Joann (你好乔安), adapted from the novel (乔安女王). After all that, she directed a film comedy featuring actresses Huang Ting Ting (黄婷婷) and Li Yi Tong (李艺彤) called (那时,可爱的她们).

Lin Yan in 2017 started the production of the drama Good Everyday (不婚女), starring with Tong Li Ya (佟丽娅) and Zhang Liang (张亮). In 2018, the business style drama (南方有乔木), (Nan fang you qiao mu) broadcast. The drama was adapted from the novel of the same name by "小狐濡尾的同名". It is set in the drone industry and tells the story of Nan Qiao, a cold and homely girl from a wealthy family, and Shi Yue, a man with a mysterious background. In the same year, Lin Yan won the first "Top Ten Young TV Drama Directors in China" award.

In 2019, she directed a young romantic drama called Crocodile and the Plover Bird (鳄鱼与牙签鸟) featuring Zhang Tian'ai (张天爱), Chen Bolin (陈柏霖), and Huang Yilin (黄一琳).

In 2020, Lin Yan broadcast drama series featuring Song Yi Ren (宋伊人) and Aaron Deng (邓超元) on Youku video streaming site called Professional Single (我凭本事单身).

In 2021, an urban drama called Good Every Day (明天我们好好过) that was adapted from a novel that 自由极光 wrote. Featuring Wang Gongliang (王宫良), Xu Fangyi (许芳铱), Tong Liya (佟丽娅), Zhang Liang (张亮) and Chen Hao (陈昊).

In 2022, Lin Yan urban emotional drama featuring Yang Mi (杨幂), and Xu Kai (许凯) called She and Her Perfect Husband (爱的二八定律) was broadcast on Youku video streaming site.

In 2023, her Take Us Home (龙城) was broadcast on CCTV as a drama with leading roles for actors and actress Ma Yili (马伊琍) and Bai Yu (白宇).

On February 14, 2024, she directed a drama adapted from a novel called《她和她的群岛》that was broadcast on CCTV and at the same time Tecent video called The Islands (烟火人家) with the lead actresses' Xu Fan (徐帆), and Ma Si Chun (马思纯).
