= Wolong (disambiguation) =

Wolong National Nature Reserve is a national nature reserve and special administrative region in Sichuan, China.

Wolong (Chinese: 卧龙; pinyin: Wòlóng) may also refer to:

== People ==
- Zhuge Liang (諸葛亮, 181–234), whose nickname is Wolong (卧龙), Chinese politician in the Three Kingdoms period
- Wolong Sheng (卧龙生), pen name of Niu Heting (1930–1997), Chinese wixia writer

== Places ==
- Wolong Gang (南阳卧龙岗), the historical former residence of Zhuge Liang (181–234) in Nanyang, Henan
- Wolong, Nanyang (河南省 南阳市 卧龙区), Henan

=== Wolong Town (卧龙镇) ===
- Wolong, Benxi, in Mingshan District, Benxi, Liaoning
- Wolong, Hebei, in Pingquan, Hebei
- Wolong, Xiangyang, in Xiangcheng District, Xiangyang, Hubei
- Wolong, Qionglai, a town in Wenchuan County, Sichuan
- Wolong, Wenchuan County, in Wenchuan County, Sichuan
- Wolong Street (臥龍街), a street in Daan District, Taipei, Taiwan, with a portion transferred to Heping Road in March 2012

== Video games ==
- Wo Long: Fallen Dynasty, a historical fantasy action role-playing video game.

== See also ==
- Wulong
