= Wulong =

Wulong may refer to:

- Oolong (烏龍; wūlóng), traditional Chinese tea
- Dragon dance (舞龍; wǔlóng), traditional Chinese performance
- Wulong (dinosaur), extinct dinosaur genus

== Places in China ==
- Wulong District, Chongqing, district of Chongqing
- Wulong Township, Chongqing in Wuxi County, Chongqing
- Wulong, Anhui, town in Huoqiu County, Anhui
- Wulong, Gansu, town in Maiji, Tianshui, Gansu
- Wulong, Guangdong, town in Deqing County, Guangdong
- Wulong Subdistrict, Qiqihar in Longsha District, Qiqihar, Heilongjiang
- Wulong, Linzhou, town in Linzhou, Henan
- Wulong, Shangcai County, town in Shangcai County, Henan
- Wulong Subdistrict, Fuxin in Haizhou District, Fuxin, Liaoning
- Wulong, Cangxi County, town in Cangxi County, Sichuan
- Wulong Township, Sichuan in Baoxing County, Sichuan
- Wulong Subdistrict, Kunming in Chenggong District, Kunming, Yunnan
- Wulong Town, Kunming, town in Dongchuan, Kunming, Yunnan
- Wulong Zhuang Ethnic Township in Shizong County, Yunnan
- Wulong Township, Zhejiang in Shengsi County, Zhejiang

== See also ==
- Wulong Temple in Pingba County, Guizhou, China
- Fighting Beauty Wulong, Japanese manga series
- Wang Wulong (born 1942), Chinese politician
- Wolong (disambiguation)
- Woolong (disambiguation)
