= Go Fighting! =

- Also known as: Chinese: 极限挑战; pinyin: Jíxiàn Tiǎozhàn
- 极限挑战; Jíxiàn Tiǎozhàn
- Genre: Game-reality-variety show
- Developed by: Yuan Lei(Season 1); Bao Xiaoqun(Seasons 1–3); Wang Jianjun, Gao Yunfei(Seasons 4–6)
- Directed by: Yan Min(Seasons 1–4); Ren Jing(Season 2), Shi Jianing(Seasons 5-current)
- Starring: Current cast members: Jia Nailiang; Justin Huang; Huang Jingyu; Gong Jun; Huang Xiaoming; Wowkie Zhang; Yan Haoxiang; Former cast members: Huang Bo; Sun Honglei; Huang Lei; Show Lo; Lay Zhang; Dilraba Dilmurat; Lei Jiayin; Deng Lun; Wang Xun; Guo Jingfei; Yang Chaoyue; Yue Yunpeng
- Opening theme: "A Man's Job 男人的事" by all original cast members
- Composer: Peng Fei
- Country of origin: China
- Original language: Chinese
- No. of seasons: 7
- No. of episodes: 62 (including special episode and movie) (list of episodes)

Production
- Executive producers: Li Yong; Zhu Tao; Bao Xiaoqun(Season 1 only)
- Production location: China
- Running time: About 90 minutes

Original release
- Network: SMG: Dragon Television
- Release: June 14, 2015 – present

Related
- Sisters Over Flowers

Go Fighting! (Chinese: 极限挑战; pinyin: Jíxiàn Tiǎozhàn) is a Chinese variety show broadcast on SMG: Dragon Television. It was first aired June 14, 2015. It is a reality game show where MCs and guests complete themed missions with minimal rules, creating an unscripted, spontaneous experience. It was listed in 'Most Popular Chinese Variety Show'.

== History ==
The show has been a commercial and critical success since its inception, and the MCs have received praise for 'breaking the rules' of usual variety game shows and mingling with normal people going about their daily lives. The first and second seasons averaged ratings of 8.9/10 and 9.1/10 on China's main review-based social network site Douban.

The show's catch phrases are "This is fate / 这就是命" and "This is love / 这就是爱" with a corresponding action that resembles the Chinese character for 'fate / 命'. Go Fighting! has been called the Chinese version of the popular Korean variety show Infinite Challenge; this comparison has led to minor controversies.

== Personnel ==
In March 2019, it was reported that original director Yan Min and cast members Huang Bo and Sun Honglei have decided to temporarily back out of the show after Season 4 due to scheduling conflicts. Huang Lei stated he would only be present for 3 episodes due to acting commitments. They were replaced by Lei Jiayin, Yue Yunpeng and Dilraba Dilmurat.

In March 2020, Season 6 began filming with a brand new cast consisting of Lei Jiayin, Guo Jingfei, Jia Nailiang, Yue Yunpeng, and Deng Lun. Wang Xun and Zhang Yixing ("Lay") were the only original cast members left.

=== Current Cast ===
Name	Age	Occupation	Duration	Notes
Huang Jing Yu	33	Actor, producer, and model	1–present	
Justin Huang	24	Actor, idol, model, singer, and dancer	1–present	501–503, 506, 509, 510; Absent: 304, 403–405, 408, 412
Huang Xiao Ming	48	Actor, model, and singer	5–present	202, 501–present
Gong Jun	33	Actor, and model	5–present	
Wowkie Zhang	43	Actor, musician, model, and singer	5–present	
Jia Nailiang	42	Actor, and model	5–present	504, 505, 507, 508, 5011
Yan Hao Xiang	22	Actor, idol, singer, and dancer	6–present	

=== Original Cast ===
Name	Age	Occupation	Duration	Notes
Sun Honglei	56	Actor	1–4	501 (video appearance), 506 (video appearance)
Huang Lei	54	Actor, Singer, Teacher, Director	1–5	Absent: 502, 503, 505, 507, 509, 510
Huang Bo	52	Actor	1–4	Absent: 302, 303
Wang Xun	51	Actor, Screenwriter, Director	1–Present	
Show Lo	47	Singer, Actor, Host	1–5	Absent: 105
Lay Zhang	34	Actor, singer, and dancer	1–Present	501–503, 506, 509, 510; Absent: 304, 403–405, 408, 412

=== Relationships ===
Relation	Members	Details
Go Fighting Three Idiots 极限三傻	Sun Honglei; Wang Xun; Lay Zhang	In episode 1/01, the three were put in a team. Sun Honglei's foolish big brother act, along with Lay Zhang's absent-mindedness and Wang Xun's slowness to realize, created this lasting combination.
Go Fighting Three Geniuses 极限三精	Huang Lei; Huang Bo; Show Lo	In episode 1/01, the three were put in a team. In comparison to the Three Idiots, these three are considered geniuses (Huang Lei in particular), although recently Show Lo has exhibited sillier behaviour, making him more alike to the Three Idiots and being referred to as the Fourth Idiot.
Minesweeper Alliance 扫雷联盟	Huang Lei; Huang Bo; Show Lo; Wang Xun; Lay Zhang	The character 'lei' in Sun Honglei's name is the same as the character for a mine. In episode 2/03, the five banded together to steal Sun Honglei's jogger step counter. In episode 2/09 however, Wang Xun joined Sun Honglei's team and the minesweeper alliance consisted of 4 people instead.
Hong-Xing Combination 红兴组合	Sun Honglei; Lay Zhang	In episode 1/02, Sun Honglei stole Lay Zhang's suitcase containing several gold bars, though the latter forgave him afterwards. Sun Honglei also broadcast a missing person notice over Shanghai's local radio station to search for Lay Zhang in episode 2/01.
Lei-Lei Combination 雷磊组合	Sun Honglei; Huang Lei	The two actors originally became friends on the set of 2011 drama Men (男人帮), and their affection for each other led to the creation of this pairing.
Teacher-Student Combination 师徒组合	Huang Lei Lay Zhang	In Season 1, Lay Zhang is stunned by Huang Lei's reasoning skills, and decides to become his student. In Season 2, the two form a team in the 24-hour bike race. They are also known as the Two-Foxes combination, as Lay later learns to be more shrewd.
Pineapple Combination 菠萝组合	Huang Bo; Show Lo	In Season 2, Huang Bo played Show Lo's mother in the comedy sketch remake of Meteor Garden. Combining the two characters from their names makes the word pineapple.
Double Huang Combination 双黄组合	Huang Lei; Huang Bo	The two have been labelled as the smartest MCs in the show after Show Lo started resembling an 'idiot'.
Pig-Sheep Combination 猪羊组合	Show Lo; Lay Zhang	They often paired up for missions, and in the last episode of Season 1, they were known as Mirror Brothers after Show successfully imitated Lay Zhang during a taxi ride.
Lei-Luo Combination 雷罗组合	Sun Honglei; Show Lo	In episode 1/06, the two were forced to cross dress as women and fight for a seat on the train. In episode 1/09, Show Lo helped Sun Honglei complete his mission of picking lotus seed heads.

== List of episodes ==
If more than one set of teams are used other than the Race Mission teams, they are divided and distinguished to the corresponding mission under Teams. Team members are listed in alphabetical order from Team Leader, to Members, to Guests. As some episodes consisted of road missions and were not confined to a single landmark nor was a landmark officially recognized on-air, the landmark shown for those episodes is the final mission venue.

=== Series overview ===
Season	Episodes	Originally aired	
Season	Episodes	Premiere	Finale
Season 1	12	June 14, 2015	September 20, 2015
Special	1 special for China's National Day week	October 5, 2015	
Movie	1	January 15, 2016	
Season 2	12	April 17, 2016	July 3, 2016
Charity Concert (full)	1	July 10, 2016	
Season 3	12	July 9, 2017	November 17, 2017
Season 4	12	April 29, 2018	July 15, 2018
Season 5	12	May 12, 2019	July 28, 2019
Season 6	12	May 10, 2020	Present

== List of guests ==
The following is a compilation of guests and the number of time they have been on the show. They are listed in order of appearance.

Daniela Anahí Bessia Guest

Guest	Episode(s)	# of Episodes Appeared	# of Appearances
Joe Chen Chiau-en	1/03	1	1
Guo Tao	1/05, 3/09	2	2
Zhou Dongyu	1/07	1	1
Chen Bolin	1/08	1	1
Xu Zheng	1/10	1	1
Song Xiaobao (宋小宝)	2/01,3/09	2	2
Yue Yunpeng (岳云鹏)	2/01	1	1
Joker Xue	2/01	1	1
Lin Chi-ling	2/04, 3/05, 3/06	3	3
Xie Na	2/10	1	1
Jiang Jinfu	2/10	1	1
Darren Wang	2/10, 3/02	2	2
Phoenix Legend	2/12, Concert	2	2
JJ Lin	2/12, Concert	2	2
Jolin Tsai	2/12, Concert	2	2
Harlem Yu	2/12, Concert	2	2
Sha Yi (沙溢)	3/02, 3/09	2	2
Eric Tsang	3/03	1	1
Bosco Wong	3/03	1	1
Elvis Tsui	3/03	1	1
Kingdom Yuen	3/03	1	1
Ronald Cheng	3/03	1	1
Lin Gengxin	3/04	1	1
Wang Luodan	3/05, 3/06	2	2
Yao Chen	3/05, 3/06	2	2
Jiang Yiyan	3/05, 3/06	2	2
Zhang Xinyi (张歆艺)	3/05, 3/06	2	2
Xia Yu	3/07	1	1
Jackson Wang	3/09	1	1
Li Liqun (李立群)	3/11	1	1
Liu Hua	3/11	1	1
Han Xue	3/12	1	1
Henry Lau	5/11, 5/12	2	2
Bai Jingting	5/8, 12/9	2	2

== Accolades ==
Year	Award	Category	Results	Ref.
2015	Asian Influence Awards Oriental Ceremony (2015亚洲最具影响力综艺节目)	Best Variety Show in Asia	Won	
2016	2016ENAwards (2016中国泛娱乐指数盛典)	Weibo Special Marketing Award	Won	

== Controversy ==
Season 1 of Go Fighting was accused of plagiarizing popular Korean variety show Infinite Challenge, causing a halt in production for almost a month, with episode 10 airing on September 6, 28 days after episode 9.

Season 3 of Go Fighting was pulled from air by SARFT a few days before Episode 10 was due to broadcast, and it was reportedly due to the promotion of undesirable social attitudes and a heavy focus on entertainment that didn't reflect the lives of ordinary people.
