= Where Are We Going, Dad? 2 =

- Film poster
- 爸爸去哪儿2
- Directed by: Xie Dikui; David Chang Hsun-Wei
- Written by: Wang Haifeng; Ya Xiao
- Cinematography: Kwan Chi-Kan; Xiao Haiping; Chen Yang; Yao Quancheng; Zhang Xiang
- Edited by: Bing Xu
- Music by: Mineaki Kawahara; Shen Yongge; Shu Wenxuan
- Production companies: Le Vision Pictures (Beijing) Co., Ltd; Beijing Tianyu Media Co., Ltd; Heli Chen'guang International Media Co., Ltd; Changsha Huimei Media Co., Ltd
- Distributed by: Le Vision Pictures (Beijing) Co., Ltd
- Release date: 19 February 2015 (China)
- Running time: 96 minutes
- Country: China
- Language: Mandarin
- Box office: US$34.8 million (China)

Where Are We Going, Dad? 2 (Chinese: 爸爸去哪儿2; pinyin: Ba ba qu na er 2) is a 2015 Chinese reality children's family film directed by Xie Dikui and David Chang Hsun-Wei. It was released on 19 February 2015.

== Cast ==
- Huang Lei
- Huang Yici (多多)
- Gary Chaw
- Joe Chaw
- Grace Chaw
- Lu Yi
- Lu Yuxuan
- Yang Wei
- YYY
- Li Rui

== Box office ==
As of 1 March 2015, the film has grossed over US$34.8 million in China.

== See also ==
- Where Are We Going, Dad? (TV series)
- Where Are We Going, Dad? (film)
