= Song Xiaobao =

Chinese comedian, actor, and TV personality

- Born: Song Baoli; 5 January 1981 (age 45); Huinan County, Tonghua, Jilin, China
- Occupations: Actor, comedian

Chinese name
- Traditional Chinese: 宋小寶
- Simplified Chinese: 宋小宝
Transcriptions
Standard Mandarin
- Hanyu Pinyin: Sòng Xiáobǎo
- Gwoyeu Romatzyh: Sonq Shyaubao
- Wade–Giles: Sung^{4} Hsiao^{2}-pao^{3}
- IPA: [sʊ̂ŋ ɕjǎʊ.pàʊ]

Song Baoli
- Traditional Chinese: 宋寶利
- Simplified Chinese: 宋宝利
Transcriptions
Standard Mandarin
- Hanyu Pinyin: Sòng Bǎolì
- Gwoyeu Romatzyh: Sonq Baolih
- Wade–Giles: Sung^{4} Pao^{3}-li^{4}
- IPA: [sʊ̂ŋ pàʊ.lî]

Song Xiaobao (born 5 January 1981) is a Chinese comedian, actor, and TV personality. He studied Errenzhuan under Zhao Benshan and has worked closely with Zhao throughout his career. He won a Huading Award in 2014 for the television drama series Cherry.

== Early life ==
Song Baoli was born on 5 January 1981 in Huinan, Tonghua, Jilin. He grew up in a rural community and dropped out of high school due to poverty. At age 16, he spent a year travelling around Heilongjiang, working as a dishwasher to earn a living.

At age 19, he was talent-spotted by an Errenzhuan troupe. He studied acting under Zhao Benshan and was Zhao's 32nd apprentice. He adopted the stage name Song Xiaobao and gained local popularity in 2009 through his part in Zhao's Heilongjiang Television show Benshan Happy Camp.

== Career ==
In 2011, he made his first national appearance on the Spring Festival TV Gala in Liaoning, China. For a few years afterwards, it was speculated that Zhao would star in the CCTV National Spring Festival Broadcast. From 2012 to 2013, he and Zhao Benshan collaborated on two films: Missing 2 and The 22 Marriage Rules. During this time, they also worked on a drama called Cherry, in which Song Xiaobao was the lead actor. Song won the 2014 Huading Award for the best actor in a city-themed Chinese drama for his part in Cherry.

In 2014, he starred in The Harvest Season by Beijing Satellite TV. In 2015, he gained more widespread popularity for his comedic works after becoming a runner up in a Chinese comedy contest TV show Happy Comedy as part of the group Liaoning Folk Art Troupe. In 2016, he was invited back to the show as a "crowd favorite" guest performer for the finals. That year, he also took part in the variety show Keep Running, teaching the Dongbei dialect on the show. In 2018, he made a surprise guest appearance at Wang Leehom's concert tour during the Shenzhen stop.

== Personal life ==
Song Xiaobao married twice. He was married to his first wife Huo Xiaohong (霍晓红), a fellow Errenzhuan actress, for seven years. It was speculated that they divorced because Huo was infertile. He subsequently married Wang Xue (王雪) and they gave birth to twins in 2011.
