= Suzhou RunHua Global Center =

Buildings in Suzhou, Jiangsu, China

Coordinates: 31.3138°N 120.6705°E

- 苏州盛高环球大厦
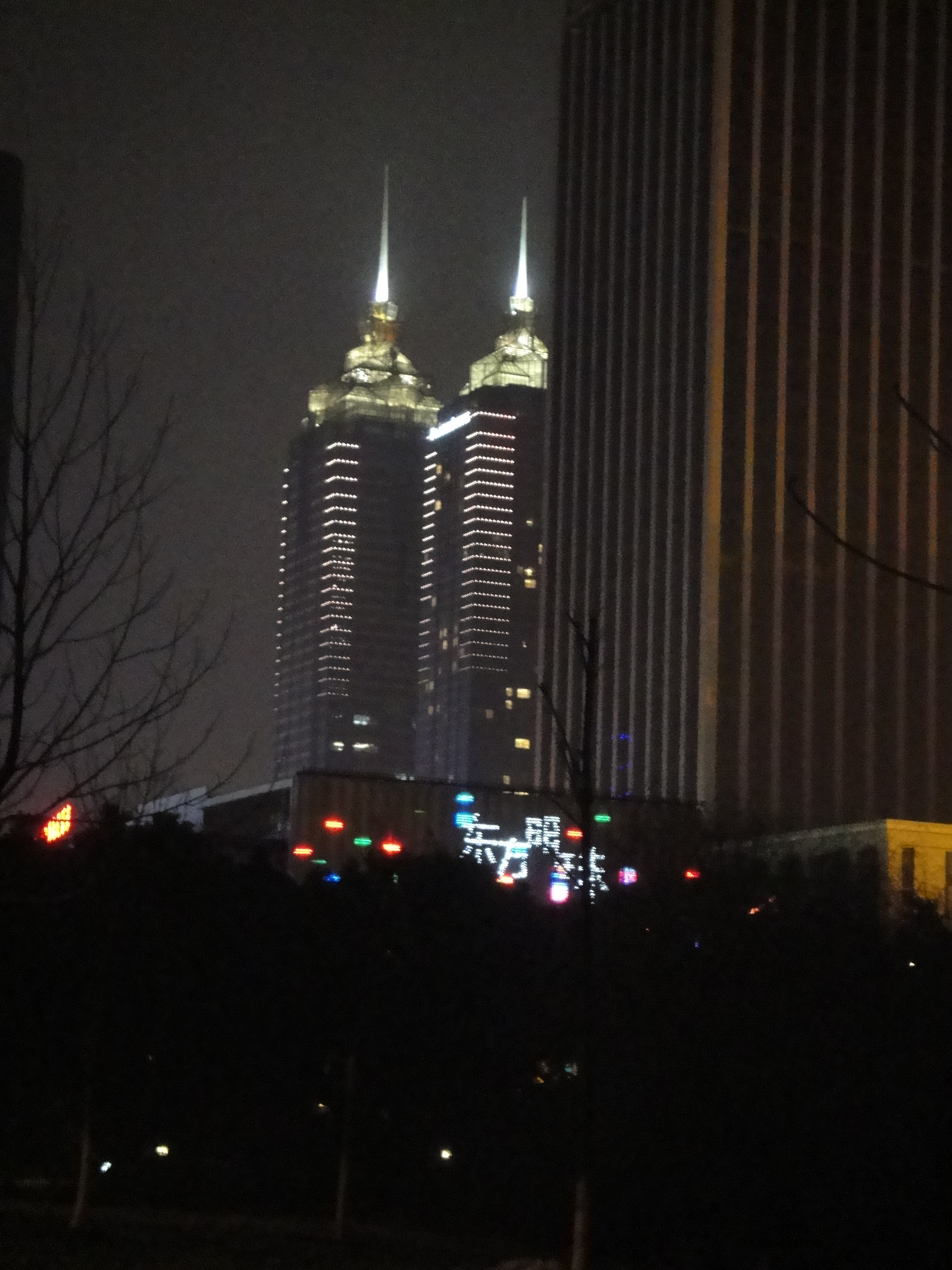
- Interactive map of the Suzhou RunHua Global Center area

General information
- Status: Completed
- Location: SIP, Suzhou, Jiangsu
- Completed: 2010

Height
- Antenna spire: A: 282 m (925 ft); B: 240 m (790 ft)

Technical details
- Floor count: A: 49; B: 54
- Floor area: A: 78,804 m^{2} (848,240 sq ft); B: ?

The Suzhou RunHua Global Center (Chinese: 苏州盛高环球大厦), formerly the SPG Global Towers, are a pair of skyscrapers in Suzhou, China. Groundbreaking on the buildings began in 2007, and they were completed in 2010. Building A is 282 m (925 ft) to the architectural tip with 49 floors, and is used mostly for office space, while tower B is 240 m (790 ft) to the architectural tip with 54 floors, and is residential.

The towers bear a striking resemblance to the One Liberty Place skyscraper complex in Philadelphia, United States.
