= Huang Lei =

Chinese actor

- Born: 6 December 1971 (age 54); Nanchang, Jiangxi, China
- Other name: 磊子 (Leizi)
- Education: Beijing Film Academy
- Occupations: Actor; singer; teacher; director; screenwriter; producer; entrepreneur
- Years active: 1990–present
- Spouse: Leslie Sun (m. 2004)
- Children: Christine Huang Yi Ci (多多) (2006) Camille Huang (2014), Juno Huang (2017)
- Parent(s): Huang Xiaoli; Cao Lile

Chinese name
- Traditional Chinese: 黃磊
- Simplified Chinese: 黄磊
Transcriptions
Standard Mandarin
- Hanyu Pinyin: Huáng Lěi
- IPA: [xwǎŋ.lèɪ]

Huang Lei (born December 6, 1971) is a Chinese actor and singer.

Huang ranked 58th on Forbes China Celebrity 100 list in 2015, 29th in 2017, and 76th in 2019. 62nd in 2017, and 63rd in 2019.

== Experience ==
In 1990, Huang entered into the Acting Department of Beijing Film Academy. He graduated with Bachelor's degree in 1994 and went into the institute of the Department of Film Performances for Master's degree program, specialising in movie performance. After graduated with Master's degree in 1997, he stayed in the Beijing Film Academy as a teacher. In the same year, he published the first music album Life on a String. In 1999, he starred in the TV show April Rhapsody as Xu Zhimo. In 2004, he published his first book The Fantasy of Seventeen Floor. In 2006, he starred in the drama Secret Love In Peach Blossom Land.

== Personal life ==
Huang and actress Li Sun had been in love since she was a freshman and he was a lecturer at Beijing Film Academy. They registered their marriage and held a small ceremony with close friends and relatives in 2004. They welcomed 2 daughters (born in 2006 and 2013) and 1 son (born in 2017). In 2016, they took wedding pictures and had a grand wedding ceremony with distinguished guests and celebrities in Chinese showbiz to mark their 20 years together.

Huang and his eldest daughter starred in the variety show Where Are We Going, Dad? (Chinese version) in 2014.

== Bibliography ==
=== Writing ===
- My Shoulders, Their Wings (Chinese: 我的肩膀，她们的翅膀; pinyin: Wǒ De Jiān Bǎng，Tā Men De Chì Bǎng, ISBN 9787539975528) (2014)
- The Fantasy of Seventeen Floor (Chinese: 十七楼的幻想; pinyin: Shí Qī Lóu De Huàn Xiǎng, ISBN 9787806781081) (2003)
- Private Recipes of Huang Lei (黄小厨的美好日常; Huáng Xiǎo Chú De Měi Hǎo Rì Cháng, ISBN 9787540475789) (2016)

=== Stage ===
Year	Style	English title	Chinese title	Credits
1992	drama	Three Sister	三姐妹	Actor
1994	drama	The Gadfly	牛虻	Actor/ Scriptwriter/ Director
1995	drama	Scarlet Letter	红字	Actor/ Scriptwriter/ Director
2006	drama	Secret Love In Peach Blossom Land	暗恋桃花源	Actor/ Executive Director
2010	drama	Four Generations in One House	四世同堂	Actor
2016	drama	Writing In Water	水中之书	Scriptwriter/ Producer

=== Music album ===
Year	English title	Chinese title	Songs
1997	Life on a String	边走边唱	啦啦歌; 边走边唱; 没有想法; 梦醒在几点钟; 半生缘; 此情此景; 内心戏; 睡在我上铺的兄弟; 三个梦; 伤感铁轨
1998		我想我是海	我想我是海; 石头; 小怜; 花开的地方; 改变; 谣言; 重新开始; 只有你让我想要; 围城; 守著阳光守著你
2000	April Rhapsody	人间四月天	我等候你+飞的理由; 我等候你 (Piano Solo); 雪花的快乐 (Flute/Guitar); 我不知道风是在那一个方向吹; 我不知道风是在那一个方向吹; 我多么羡慕你 (Guitar); 雪花的快乐 (Piano); 雪花的快乐 黄磊; 我多么羡慕你 江美琪; 飞的理由 (Piano); 我等候你 (Accordion); 我不知道风是在那一个方向吹; 我多么羡慕你 江美琪; 再别康桥 黄磊
2001	And So On	等等等等	序曲; 橘子红了; 蝴蝶结; 冰点与沸点; 你知道我爱你; 云烟; 等等等等; 背影; 再别再别康桥; 玉卿嫂; 老车站
2003		似水年华	年华似水(dialogue); 年华似水; 年华似水(piano dialogue); 当我想你的时候; 四分之三的爱; 似水年华; 四分之三的爱(piano version); 于事无补; 邂逅(dialogue); 深; 邂逅; 小丑恋歌; 曾经(dialogue); 情奔; 曾经(guitar version); 何德何能

=== Dubbing work ===
Year	Style	English title	Chinese title
2011	Film	Cars 2	赛车总动员2
2014	Film	Ice Age: The Meltdown	冰川时代2
2014	Film	McDull·me & my mum	麦兜我和我的妈妈
2014	Film	Legend of A Rabbit：TheMartial of Fire	兔侠之青黎传说
2015	Film	Le Petit Prince	小王子
2015	Film	Kungfu Panda 3	功夫熊猫3
2016	Film	The BFG	圆梦巨人
2017	Film	Cars 3	赛车总动员3

=== Filmography ===
Year	English title	Chinese title	Role/Ref.
2019	Push and Shove	狗眼看人心	Yu Feng
2018	Monster Hunt 2	捉妖记2	
2018	The Faces of My Gene	祖宗十九代	
2017	Midnight Diner	深夜食堂	Master
2017	What A Wonderful Family	麻烦家族	
2016	Royal Treasure	极限挑战之皇家宝藏	Himself
2015	Phantom of the Theatre	魔宫魅影	
2015	Where Are We Going, Dad? 2	爸爸去哪儿2	Himself
2014	McDull: Me & My Mum	麥兜·我和我媽媽	
2014	One Step Away	触不可及	
2014	Overheard 3	竊聽風雲3	Wan
2013	Angry Kid	愤怒的小孩	
2012	All for Love	三个未婚妈妈	
2011	The Founding of a Party	建党伟业	Cao Rulin
2011	Husband And Wife	夫妻那些事	
2011	Energy Behind the Heart	用心跳	
2010	Energy Behind the Heart	用心跳	teacher of dance academy
2009	Mars Baby	火星宝贝之火星没事	Luo Bingwen(罗秉文)
2008	Fit Lover	爱情呼叫转移2爱情左右	
2003	38 Degrees	38 °C	
2000	April Rhapsody	人间四月天	Xu Zhimo
2000	Fleeing by Night	夜奔	
1999	Fascination Amour	爱情梦幻号	Timothy Wang
1997	Eighteen Springs	半生缘	
1995	The Phantom Lover	夜半歌声	
1993	Farewell My Concubine	霸王别姬	
1991	Life On a String	边走边唱	

=== Variety shows ===
List of programs
Year	English title	Chinese title	Network
2018	Who's the Keyman	我是大侦探	Hunan Television
2017–Present	Back to Field	向往的生活	Mango TV
2017	Who's the Murder II	明星大侦探2	Mango TV
2016—2017		黄小厨的春夏秋冬	Tencent Video
2016		穿越吧厨房	Youku Video
2015		我们相爱时 20年	iQiYi
2015–Present	Go Fighting!	极限挑战	SMG: Dragon Television
2014-2017	If You Are the One	非诚勿扰	JSBC: Jiangsu Television
2014-2015	Where Are We Going, Dad?	爸爸去哪儿	Hunan Television

== Awards and nominations ==
Year	Award Ceremony	Award	Result
1991	Cannes International Film Festival		Nominated
1996	Chang Chun Film Festival-China	Best Male Supporting Role	Won
1999	China Film Society of Performing Arts	Golden Phoenix Awards	Won
2000	Asian Pacific Film Festival	Best Actor	Nominated
2002	Asian Television Festival	Best Actor	Nominated
2005	China Film Society Of Performing Arts	Golfen Phoenix Awards	Nominated
2008	Magnolia Award	Best Actor	Nominated
2011	Hongkong Rainbow TV Award	Best Actor in a Comedy	Won
2015	The Tripod Award	Best Actor	Nominated
2015	Magnolia Award	Best Actor	Nominated
2015	Flying Apsaras Award	Best Actor	Nominated
2017	The Tripod Award	Best Actor	Nominated
2017	Magnolia Award	Best Actor	Nominated
