= Where Are We Going, Dad? (TV series) =

Chinese reality television show

- Second season lo
- 爸爸去哪儿; Bàba Qù Nǎr
- Created by: Munhwa Broadcasting Corporation
- Starring: 1: Jimmy Lin Chih-ying, Wang Yuelun, Guo Tao, Zhang Liang, Tian Liang; 2: Francis Ng Chun-yu, Huang Lei, Lu Yi, Gary Chaw Ge, Yang Wei; 3: Liu Ye, Hu Jun, Zou Shiming, Lin Yongjian, Chris Downs, Wang Baoqiang; 4: Tian Liang, Zhang Lun Shuo, Cai Guoqing, Sha Yi, Dong Li; 5: Jordan Chan, Wu Chun, Will Liu, Deng Lun, Du Jiang
- Ending theme: 《爸爸去哪儿》 Where Are We Going? Dad
- Country of origin: China
- Original language: Standard Chinese
- No. of series: 5
- No. of episodes: 54

Production
- Producers: Lyu Huanbin, Zhang Huali, Li Hao
- Editors: Xie Dikui, Hong Tao
- Camera setup: Multicamera setup
- Running time: 90–120 minutes

Original release
- Network: HBS: Hunan Television
- Release: 11 October 2013 – present

Where Are We Going, Dad? (Chinese: 爸爸去哪儿; pinyin: Bàba qù nǎr) is a Chinese reality TV show broadcast on Hunan Television. Based on the original South Korean reality show Dad! Where Are We Going?, the first season debuted on 11 October, 2013 featuring five fathers and their children as they travel to rural places. The series has become a massive ratings hit, attracting 75 million viewers per episode to Hunan Television every week. It was adapted into a film, Where Are We Going, Dad?, that was released on 31 January, 2014. A second film, Where Are We Going, Dad? 2, was released on 19 February, 2015. The second season debuted in June 2014 and the third season was filmed on 17 May, 2015 in Yulin, Shaanxi.

== Participants ==
=== Season 1 ===
Father			Child		
Name	Profession	Birthdate & age	Name		Birthdate & age Age at the beginning of the season
Jimmy Lin Chih-ying 林志颖; Lín Zhìyǐng	singer, actor, & race-car driver	15 October 1974 (age 51)	Kimi/Xiǎoxiǎo Zhì (小小志)/Hēimǐ (黑米); Kimi Lin	son	15 September 2009 (age 17) age 4
Wang Yuelun 王岳伦; Wáng Yuèlún	director	27 September 1973 (age 53)	Angela/Tiántián (恬恬) 王诗龄; Wáng Shīlíng	daughter	13 October 2009 (age 16) age 3
Guo Tao 郭涛; Guō Tāo	actor	17 December 1969 (age 56)	Shítou (石头)/Leader (队长） 郭子睿; Guō Ziruì	son	26 February 2007 (age 19) age 6
Zhang Liang 张亮; Zhāng Liàng	model	26 March 1982 (age 44)	Tiāntiān (天天) 张悦轩; Zhāng Yuèxuān	son	12 November 2007 (age 18) age 5
Tian Liang 田亮; Tián Liàng	diver & actor	27 August 1979 (age 47)	Cindy / Sēndié (森蝶) 田雨橙; Tián Yǔchéng	daughter	15 April 2008 (age 18) age 5

=== Season 2 ===
Father			Child		
Name	Profession	Birthdate & age	Name		Birthdate & age Age at the beginning of the season
Francis Ng Chun-yu 吴镇宇; Wú Zhènyǔ	actor & director	21 December 1961 (age 64)	Feynman 吴费曼; Wú Fèimàn (Actual Chinese name undisclosed)	son	27 September 2008 (age 18) age 5
Huang Lei 黄磊; Huáng Lěi	actor, director, singer, model, & screenwriter	6 December 1971 (age 54)	Christine/Duōduō (多多)/Dà Jiějiě (大姐姐)/Leader (队长） 黄忆慈; Huáng Yìcí	daughter	6 February 2006 (age 20) age 8
Lu Yi 陆毅; Lù Yì	actor & singer	6 January 1976 (age 50)	Belle/Bèi'er (贝儿) 陆雨萱; Lù Yǔxuān	daughter	26 October 2008 (age 17) age 5
Gary Chaw 曹格; Cáo Gé	singer-songwriter	9 July 1979 (age 47)	Joe 曹三丰; Cáo Sānfēng	son	21 August 2008 (age 18) age 5
Gary Chaw 曹格; Cáo Gé	singer-songwriter	9 July 1979 (age 47)	Grace/Jiějiě (姐姐) 曹华恩; Cáo Huá'ēn	daughter	24 September 2010 (age 16) age 3
Yang Wei 杨威; Yáng Wēi	gymnast	8 February 1980 (age 46)	Yáng Yángyáng (杨阳洋) 杨文昌; Yáng Wénchāng	son	6 November 2009 (age 16) age 4

=== Season 3 ===
Father			Child		
Name	Profession	Birthdate & age	Name		Birthdate & age Age at the beginning of the season
Liu Ye 刘烨; Líu Yè	actor	23 March 1978 (age 48)	Noé/Nuòyī 刘诺一; Liú Nuòyī	son	10 October 2010 (age 15) age 4
Hu Jun 胡军; Hú Jūn	actor	18 March 1968 (age 58)	Kāngkāng/Leader (队长） 胡皓康; Hú Hàokāng	son	11 November 2008 (age 17) age 6
Zou Shiming 邹市明; Zōu Shìmíng	professional boxer	18 May 1981 (age 45)	Xuānxuān 邹明轩; Zōu Míngxuān	son	27 June 2011 (age 15) age 4
Lin Yongjian 林永健; Lín Yǒngjiàn	actor	14 February 1970 (age 56)	Dàjùn 林大竣; Lín Dàjùn	son	25 August 2010 (age 16) age 4
Chris Downs 夏克立; Xià Kèlì	anchor, actor, writer, & producer	6 February 1972 (age 54)	Poppy/Xiàtiān; Kyana Poppy Downs; 夏天; Xiàtiān	daughter	2 December 2009 (age 16) age 5
Wang Baoqiang (since Ep. 9) 王宝强; Wáng Bǎoqiáng	actor	29 May 1984 (age 42)	Nànà (娜娜) 王子珊; Wáng Zǐshān	daughter	28 October 2011 (age 14) age 3

=== Season 4 ===
Father			Child		
Name	Profession	Birthdate & age	Name		Birthdate & age Age at the beginning of the season
Cai Guoqing 蔡国庆; Cài Guóqìng	singer	17 September 1968 (age 58)	Qìng Qìng(庆庆) 蔡轩正; Cài Xuānzhèng	son	15 April 2011 (age 15)
Sha Yi 沙溢; Shā Yì	actor	15 February 1978 (age 48)	Ān jí(安吉) 沙俊伯; Shā Jùnbó	son	16 July 2011 (age 15)
Tian Liang 田亮; Tián Liàng	diver & actor	27 August 1979 (age 47)	Xiǎo Liàngzǎi(小亮仔) 田宸宇; Tián Chényŭ	son	8 November 2011 (age 14)
Jacky Heung (Interim Father) 向佐; Replaced Huáng Zhìliè	Actor	20 July 1984 (age 42)	Lǐ Yìháng 李亦航	son	28 May 2011 (age 15)
Dong Li (Interim Father) 董力; Dǒng Lì	fencing athlete	23 August 1993 (age 33)	Ā Lāléi(阿拉蕾) 崔雅涵; Cuī Yǎhán	daughter	1 October 2012 (age 14)
Zhang Lunshuo (Stepfather) 张伦硕; Zhāng Lúnshuò	actor & singer	9 July 1982 (age 44)	Cayla/Kǎo Lā (考拉)/Leader (队长） 严稚棱; Yán Zhìléng	daughter	6 February 2010 (age 16)

=== Season 5 ===
Father			Child		
Name	Profession	Birthdate & age	Name		Birthdate & age Age at the beginning of the season
Jordan Chan 陈小春; Chén Xiǎochūn	singer & actor	8 July 1967 (age 59)	Jasper Chan 陳胤捷 (小小春)	son	1 July 2013 (age 13)
Wu Zun 吳尊; Wú Zūn	actor, singer & model	10 October 1979 (age 46)	Neinei/Leader (队长） 吳欣怡; Wú Xīn Yí	daughter	10 October 2010 (age 15)
Wu Zun 吳尊; Wú Zūn	actor, singer & model	10 October 1979 (age 46)	Max 吳欣樂; Wú Xīn Lè	son	11 October 2013 (age 12)
Du Jiang 杜江; Dù Jiāng	actor	10 September 1985 (age 41)	Eń hēng (嗯哼) 杜宇麒; Dù Yǔqí	son	19 September 2013 (age 13)
Will Liu 刘畊宏; Líu Gēnghóng	singer, actor & songwriter	7 October 1972 (age 54)	Xiǎo Pàofú (小泡芙) 刘宇芙; Liú Yǔfú	daughter	22 July 2013 (age 13)
Deng Lun (Interim Father) 邓伦; Dèng Lún	actor	21 October 1992 (age 33)	Xiǎo Shān Zhú (小山竹) 纪美伊; Jì Měiyī	daughter	19 September 2012 (age 14)

== Episodes ==
=== Season 1 ===
Station	EP	Air date	Filming date(s)	Landmark	
Station	EP	Air date	Filming date(s)	Location	Geographical feature
1st Leg	1	11 October 2013	24–25 August 2013	Lingshuicun; Mentougou District, Beijing	A North China hamlet
1st Leg	2	18 October 2013	24–25 August 2013	Lingshuicun; Mentougou District, Beijing	A North China hamlet
2nd Leg	3	25 October 2013	17–19 September 2013	Tengger Desert; Shapotou District, Zhongwei, Ningxia	A Northwest China desert
2nd Leg	4	1 November 2013	17–19 September 2013	Tengger Desert; Shapotou District, Zhongwei, Ningxia	A Northwest China desert
3rd Leg	5	8 November 2013	15–16 October 2013	Puzhehei; Qiubei County, Wenshan Prefecture, Yunnan	A Southwest China karst
3rd Leg	6	15 November 2013^{[a]}	15–16 October 2013	Puzhehei; Qiubei County, Wenshan Prefecture, Yunnan	A Southwest China karst
4th Leg	7	22 November 2013	29–30 October 2013	Jiming Island; Rongcheng, Weihai, Shandong	An East China island
4th Leg	8	29 November 2013	29–30 October 2013	Jiming Island; Rongcheng, Weihai, Shandong	An East China island
5th Leg	9	6 December 2013	15–16 November 2013	Beisicun; Pingjiang County, Yueyang, Hunan	A South Central China hamlet
5th Leg	10	13 December 2013	15–16 November 2013	Beisicun; Pingjiang County, Yueyang, Hunan	A South Central China hamlet
6th Leg	11	20 December 2013	27–28 November 2013	Xuexiang; Hailin, Mudanjiang, Heilongjiang	A North East China hamlet
6th Leg	12	27 December 2013	27–28 November 2013	Xuexiang; Hailin, Mudanjiang, Heilongjiang	A North East China hamlet
Film		31 January 2014	16–17 January 2014	Chimelong Safari Park; Panyu District, Guangzhou, Guangdong	A South Central China safari park

=== Season 2 ===
Station	EP	Air date	Filming date(s)	Landmark		Guest Appearance
Station	EP	Air date	Filming date(s)	Location	Geographical feature	Guest Appearance
1st Leg	1	20 June 2014	11–13 May 2014	Xiaozhai Tiankeng (Yuquancun); Wulong County, Chongqing	A Southwest China sinkhole	Huang Jianxiang
1st Leg	2	27 June 2014	11–13 May 2014	Xiaozhai Tiankeng (Yuquancun); Wulong County, Chongqing	A Southwest China sinkhole	Huang Jianxiang
2nd Leg	3	4 July 2014	24–26 May 2014	Xinyecun; Jiande, Hangzhou, Zhejiang	An East China hamlet	Yao Ming
2nd Leg	4	11 July 2014	24–26 May 2014	Xinyecun; Jiande, Hangzhou, Zhejiang	An East China hamlet	Yao Ming
3rd Leg	5	18 July 2014	7–8 June 2014	Ethnic Miao Camp; Jingzhou County, Huaihua, Hunan	A South Central China hamlet	Wang Han
3rd Leg	6	25 July 2014	7–8 June 2014	Ethnic Miao Camp; Jingzhou County, Huaihua, Hunan	A South Central China hamlet	Wang Han
4th Leg	7	1 August 2014	23–24 June 2014	Hongkou Township; Dujiangyan, Chengdu, Sichuan	A Southwest China basin	Mother Group
4th Leg	8	8 August 2014	23–24 June 2014	Hongkou Township; Dujiangyan, Chengdu, Sichuan	A Southwest China basin	Mother Group
5th Leg	9	15 August 2014	7–8 July 2014	Inner Mongolian Grassland; Hulunbuir, Inner Mongolia	A North China grassland	Guo Tao, Shitou, Zhang Liang, Tiantian
5th Leg	10	22 August 2014	7–8 July 2014	Inner Mongolian Grassland; Hulunbuir, Inner Mongolia	A North China grassland	Guo Tao, Shitou, Zhang Liang, Tiantian
6th Leg	11	29 August 2014	28–30 July 2014	Yellow River Stone Forest; Jingtai County, Baiyin, Gansu	A Northwest China desert	none
6th Leg	12	5 September 2014	28–30 July 2014	Yellow River Stone Forest; Jingtai County, Baiyin, Gansu	A Northwest China desert	none
7th Leg	13	12 September 2014	13–15 August 2014	Formosa (Treasure Island); Ruisui, Hualien County, Taiwan	An Amis Aboriginal Heartland coastal hamlet in Eastern Taiwan	Jimmy Lin Chih-ying, Kimi
7th Leg	14	19 September 2014	13–15 August 2014	Formosa (Treasure Island); Ruisui, Hualien County, Taiwan	An Amis Aboriginal Heartland coastal hamlet in Eastern Taiwan	Jimmy Lin Chih-ying, Kimi
8th Leg	15	26 September 2014	2-? September 2014	Rotorua; Bay of Plenty, North Island, New Zealand	A Māori Heartland volcanic and geothermal hamlet	Huang Bo, Tong Dawei
8th Leg	16	3 October 2014	2-? September 2014	Rotorua; Bay of Plenty, North Island, New Zealand	A Māori Heartland volcanic and geothermal hamlet	Huang Bo, Tong Dawei
Film 2		19 February 2015	? January 2015	Viti; Fiji	A Southern Pacific Melanesian island	

=== Season 3 ===
Station	EP	Air date	Filming date(s)	Landmark		Guest Appearance
Station	EP	Air date	Filming date(s)	Location	Geographical feature	Guest Appearance
1st Leg	1	10 July 2015	18–21 May 2015	Wangyangwacun; Zizhou County, Yulin, Shaanxi	A Northwest China plateau (Loess Plateau)	
1st Leg	2	17 July 2015	18–21 May 2015	Wangyangwacun; Zizhou County, Yulin, Shaanxi	A Northwest China plateau (Loess Plateau)	
2nd Leg	3	24 July 2015	16–19 June 2015	Xishuangbanna Dai Autonomous Prefecture; Menghai County, Xishuangbanna, Yunnan	A Southwest China rainforest	
2nd Leg	4	31 July 2015	16–19 June 2015	Xishuangbanna Dai Autonomous Prefecture; Menghai County, Xishuangbanna, Yunnan	A Southwest China rainforest	
3rd Leg	5	7 August 2015	6–9 July 2015	Hekengcun; Shuyang, Nanjing County, Fujian	South China hills and tulou	Kingdom Yuen, Liu Nina
3rd Leg	6	14 August 2015	6–9 July 2015	Hekengcun; Shuyang, Nanjing County, Fujian	South China hills and tulou	Kingdom Yuen, Liu Nina
4th Leg	7	21 August 2015	20–24 July 2015	Qingwaxiang; Gaochang District, Turpan, Xinjiang	Northwest China oasis (Turpan Depression)	Zou Minghao
4th Leg	8	28 August 2015	20–24 July 2015	Ulastai Ranch; Ürümqi County, Ürümqi, Xinjiang	A Northwest China grassland	Zou Minghao
5th Leg	9	11 September 2015	11–13 August 2015	Guanxia Ethnic Miao Township; Suining County, Shaoyang, Hunan	A South Central China hamlet	
5th Leg	10	18 September 2015	11–13 August 2015	Guanxia Ethnic Miao Township; Suining County, Shaoyang, Hunan	A South Central China hamlet	
6th Leg	11	25 September 2015	22–24 August 2015	Beixiacun; Qingyuan District, Ji'an, Jiangxi	An East China hamlet	Liu Nina; Mothers: Anais Martane, Ran Yingying, Zhou Dongqi, Phoebe Huang, Ma Rong
6th Leg	12	2 October 2015	22–24 August 2015	Beixiacun; Qingyuan District, Ji'an, Jiangxi	An East China hamlet	Liu Nina; Mothers: Anais Martane, Ran Yingying, Zhou Dongqi, Phoebe Huang, Ma Rong
7th Leg	13	9 October 2015	6–8 September 2015	Hengdian World Studios; Hengdian, Dongyang, Jinhua, Zhejiang	Film studio replica of the Forbidden City	Vanness Wu, Wong Cho-lam, Ning Jing, Louis Fan, Liu Tao, Da Zhangwei
7th Leg	14	16 October 2015	6–8 September 2015	Hengdian World Studios; Hengdian, Dongyang, Jinhua, Zhejiang	Film studio replica of the Forbidden City	Vanness Wu, Wong Cho-lam, Ning Jing, Louis Fan, Liu Tao, Da Zhangwei
8th Leg	15	23 October 2015	22–24 September 2015	Perth; Western Australia, Australia		
8th Leg	16	30 October 2015	22–24 September 2015	Perth; Western Australia, Australia		

=== Season 4 ===
Station	EP	Air date	Filming date(s)	Landmark		Guest Appearance
Station	EP	Air date	Filming date(s)	Location	Geographical feature	Guest Appearance
1st Leg	1	14 October 2016	14–16 September 2016	Baihabacun; Tireketi Township，Habahe County, Altay Prefecture, Xinjiang Uyghur Autonomous Region		
1st Leg	2	21 October 2016	14–16 September 2016	Baihabacun; Tireketi Township，Habahe County, Altay Prefecture, Xinjiang Uyghur Autonomous Region		

== Broadcast TV Stations ==
Start on July 24, 2015, Sky Link TV air Where Are We Going, Dad? simultaneously broadcast with Hunan Television on Fridays 21:00.
