= Got7 discography =

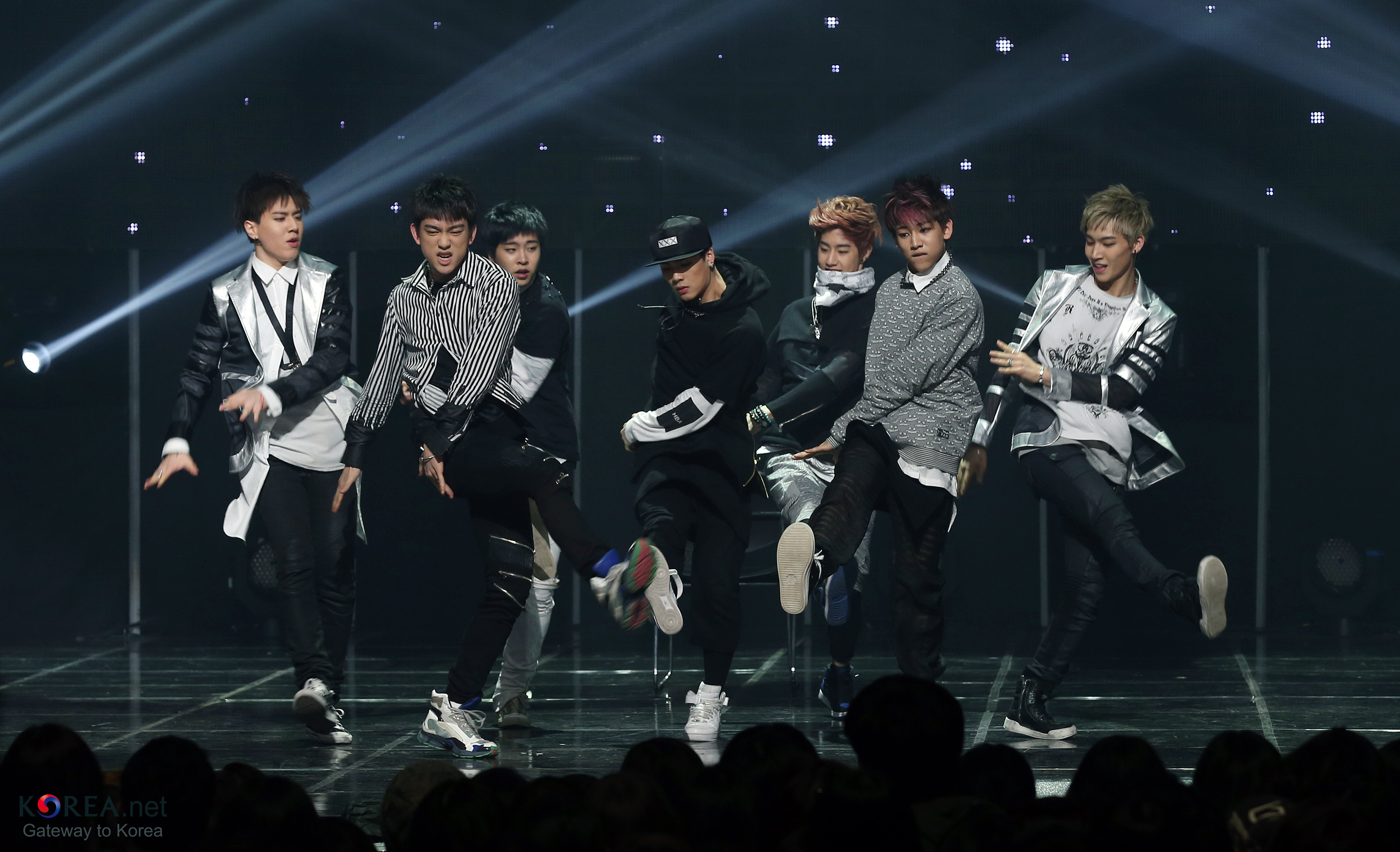
- Got7 performing at M! Countdown in 2014
- Studio albums: 5
- EPs: 17
- Singles: 23
- Video albums: 12
- Box sets: 2

Got7, a K-pop boy group based in South Korea, have released five studio albums, seventeen EPs, twenty-three singles, and two box sets. Formed by JYP Entertainment in 2013, Got7 made their debut in January 2014 with the EP Got It?, which debuted at number two on the Gaon Albums Chart. The EP's lead single "Girls Girls Girls" peaked at number 21 on the Gaon Singles Chart. In October 2014, Got7 debuted in Japan with their first Japanese-language release "Around the World", peaking at number three on the Oricon's singles charts. A month later, Got7 returned to Korea to release their first full-length album Identify, and topped the albums chart.

== Albums ==
=== Studio albums ===
List of studio albums, with selected chart positions, sales figures and certifications
Title	Album details	Peak chart positions								Sales	Certifications (Note: In April 2018, Gaon Chart introduced music recording certifications for albums, downloads and streamings.)
Title	Album details	KOR	BEL	FRA	JPN	JPN Hot	NZ Heat	US Heat	US World	Sales	Certifications
Identify	Released: November 18, 2014 (KOR); Label: JYP Entertainment; Formats: CD, digital download, USB	1	—	—	47	—	—	—	6	KOR: 101,729; JPN: 6,482	—N/a
Moriagatteyo (モリ↑ガッテヨ)	Released: February 3, 2016 (JPN); Label: Epic, Sony Music Japan; Format: CD, digital download	—	—	—	3	3	—	—	—	JPN: 30,457	
Flight Log: Turbulence	Released: September 27, 2016 (KOR); Label: JYP Entertainment; Formats: CD, digital download	1	178	136	23	—	6	7	1	KOR: 251,021; JPN: 7,497; US: 2,000	—N/a
Present: You	Released: September 17, 2018 (KOR); Label: JYP Entertainment; Formats: CD, digital download	1	175	—	12	— (Note: Present: You did not enter the Billboard Japan Hot Albums chart, but it peaked at number 52 on the Billboard Japan Download Albums chart.)	—	7	3	KOR: 343,998; JPN: 15,246	KMCA: Platinum
Breath of Love: Last Piece	Released: November 30, 2020 (KOR); Label: JYP Entertainment; Formats: CD, digital download	3	—	—	21	86	—	4	7	KOR: 357,906	KMCA: Platinum
"—" denotes releases that did not chart or were not released in that region.

=== Reissues ===
List of reissues, with selected chart positions and sales
Title	Album details	Peak chart positions			Sales
Title	Album details	KOR	JPN Hot	US World	Sales
Mad Winter Edition	Released: November 23, 2015 (KOR); Label: JYP Entertainment; Formats: CD, digital download	2	—	12	KOR: 30,020
Present: You & Me	Released: December 3, 2018 (KOR); Label: JYP Entertainment; Formats: CD, digital download	1	—	—	KOR: 196,470
Love Loop ~Sing for U Special Edition~	Released: December 18, 2019 (JPN); Label: Epic, Sony Music Japan; Formats: CD, digital download	—	40	—	
"—" denotes releases that did not chart or were not released in that region.

=== Box sets ===
List of box sets, with selected chart positions, sales figures and certifications
Title	Album details	Peak chart positions		Sales	Certifications
Title	Album details	TW	TH	Sales	Certifications
Got Love Taiwan Special Edition	Released: July 18, 2014 (TW); Label: Universal Music Taiwan; Formats: CD, DVD, digital download	7	—		
Got7 Thailand Special Set	Released: September 25, 2014 (TH); Label: Sony Music Thailand; Formats: CD	—	1	TH: 5,900	TECA: Gold
"—" denotes releases that did not chart or were not released in that region.

== Extended plays ==
List of extended plays, with selected chart positions, sales figures and certifications
Title	EP details	Peak chart positions								Sales	Certifications
Title	EP details	KOR	AUS	BEL	JPN	JPN Hot	NZ Heat	US Heat	US World	Sales	Certifications
Got It?	Released: January 20, 2014 (KOR); Label: JYP Entertainment; Formats: CD, digital download	2	—	—	71	—	—	—	1	KOR: 64,123; JPN: 6,728	—N/a
Got Love	Released: June 23, 2014 (KOR); Label: JYP Entertainment; Formats: CD, digital download	1	—	—	72	—	—	—	6	KOR: 69,293; JPN: 6,120	—N/a
Just Right	Released: July 13, 2015 (KOR); Label: JYP Entertainment; Formats: CD, digital download	3	—	—	32	—	—	—	—	KOR: 109,765; JPN: 4,347	—N/a
Mad	Released: September 30, 2015 (KOR); Label: JYP Entertainment; Formats: CD, digital download	1	—	—	39	—	—	15	1	KOR: 108,762; JPN: 7,412	—N/a
Flight Log: Departure	Released: March 21, 2016 (KOR); Label: JYP Entertainment; Formats: CD, digital download	1	—	—	21	—	—	2	2	KOR: 188,494; JPN: 7,497; US: 7,000	—N/a
Hey Yah	Released: November 16, 2016 (JPN); Label: Epic, Sony Music Japan; Format: CD, digital download	—	—	—	3	2	—	—	—	JPN: 42,602	—N/a
Flight Log: Arrival	Released: March 13, 2017 (KOR); Label: JYP Entertainment; Formats: CD, digital download	1	92	182	9	—	8	3	1	KOR: 339,475; JPN: 7,995; US: 3,000	—N/a
7 for 7	Released: October 10, 2017 (KOR); Re-edition: December 7, 2017 (KOR); Label: JYP Entertainment; Formats: CD, digital download	1	—	194	20	—	8	6	2	KOR: 393,832; JPN: 10,047	—N/a
Turn Up	Released: November 15, 2017 (JPN); Label: Epic, Sony Music Japan; Format: CD, digital download	—	—	—	3	4	—	—	—	JPN: 55,505	—N/a
Eyes on You	Released: March 12, 2018 (KOR); Label: JYP Entertainment; Formats: CD, digital download	1	—	—	13	80	4	2	2	KOR: 338,644; JPN: 9,127; US: 2,000	KMCA: Platinum
I Won't Let You Go	Released: January 30, 2019 (JPN); Label: Epic, Sony Music Japan; Format: CD, digital download	—	—	—	1	1	*	—	12	JPN: 61,040	—N/a
Spinning Top	Released: May 20, 2019 (KOR); Label: JYP Entertainment; Formats: CD, digital download	1	— (Note: Spinning Top did not enter the ARIA Albums Chart, but peaked at number 32 on the ARIA Digital Album Chart.)	—	13	— (Note: Spinning Top did not enter the Billboard Japan Hot Albums chart, but it peaked at number 49 on the Billboard Japan Download Albums chart.)	*	9	5	KOR: 316,565; JPN: 3,448; US: 1,000	KMCA: Platinum
Love Loop	Released: July 31, 2019 (JPN); Label: Epic, Sony Music Japan; Formats: CD, digital download	—	—	—	2	3	*	—	15	JPN: 49,753	—N/a
Call My Name	Released: November 4, 2019 (KOR); Label: JYP Entertainment; Formats: CD, digital download	1	— (Note: Call My Name did not enter the ARIA Albums Chart, but peaked at number 17 on the ARIA Digital Album Chart.)	—	16	— (Note: Call My Name did not enter the Billboard Japan Hot Albums chart, but it peaked at number 42 on the Billboard Japan Download Albums chart.)	*	8	5	KOR: 305,953; JPN: 5,031; US: 1,000	KMCA: Platinum
Dye	Released: April 20, 2020 (KOR); Label: JYP Entertainment; Formats: CD, digital download	1	—	192	20	72	*	9	4	KOR: 454,437; JPN: 3,144; US: 4,000	KMCA: Platinum
Got7	Released: May 23, 2022 (KOR); Label: Warner Music Korea; Formats: CD, digital download	2	— (Note: Got7 did not enter the ARIA Albums Chart, but peaked at number three on the ARIA Digital Album Chart.)	124	38	43	*	11	8	KOR: 459,254; JPN: 2,173 (Phy.)	KMCA: 2× Platinum
Winter Heptagon	Released: January 20, 2025 (KOR); Label: Kakao Entertainment; Formats: CD, digital download	3	—	—	24	— (Note: Winter Heptagon did not enter the Billboard Japan Hot Albums chart, but it peaked at number 11 on the Billboard Japan Download Albums chart.)	*	*	18	KOR: 184,458; JPN: 1,897 (Phy.)	
"—" denotes releases that did not chart or were not released in that region. "*" denotes chart does not exist at that time.

== Singles ==
=== Korean singles ===
List of Korean singles, showing year released, selected chart positions, sales figures, and name of the album
Title	Year	Peak chart positions					Sales (DL)	Album
Title	Year	KOR	KOR Hot (Note: The Kpop Hot 100 was discontinued on July 16, 2014. The chart was re-established as the South Korea Songs on the chart issue dated May 29 – June 4, 2017.)	JPN Hot	PHL (Note: The Philippine Hot 100 was first issued on June 12, 2017, and discontinued on January 15, 2018. It was then relaunched on July 6, 2024.)	US World	Sales (DL)	Album
"Girls Girls Girls"	2014	21	36	—	*	8	KOR: 194,534	Got It?
"A"	2014	16	31	—	*	5	KOR: 206,068	Got Love
"Stop Stop It" (하지하지마)	2014	25	*	—	*	4	KOR: 138,480	Identify
"Just Right" (딱 좋아)	2015	20	*	—	*	3	KOR: 211,444	Just Right
"If You Do" (니가 하면)	2015	9	*	—	*	—	KOR: 150,499	Mad
"Confession Song" (고백송)	2015	34	*	—	*	5	KOR: 43,931	Mad Winter Edition
"Fly"	2016	9	*	—	*	2	KOR: 123,062	Flight Log: Departure
"Home Run"	2016	62	*	—	*	3	KOR: 36,082	Flight Log: Departure
"Hard Carry" (하드캐리)	2016	3	*	—	*	2	KOR: 132,299	Flight Log: Turbulence
"Never Ever"	2017	5	*	—	*	3	KOR: 103,944	Flight Log: Arrival
"You Are"	2017	12	10	—	82	4	KOR: 80,029	7 for 7
"One and Only You" (너 하나만) (featuring Hyolyn)	2018	76	75	—	*	6	—N/a	Eyes on You
"Look"	2018	15	3	22	*	3	—N/a	Eyes on You
"Lullaby"	2018	19	1	94	*	2	—N/a	Present: You
"Miracle"	2018	— (Note: "Miracle" did not enter the Gaon Digital chart top 200, but peaked at no. 27 on Gaon Download chart.)	17	—	*	4		Present: You & Me
"Eclipse"	2019	65	3	84	*	13	US: 1,000	Spinning Top
"You Calling My Name" (니가 부르는 나의 이름)	2019	98	63	—	*	3	US: 1,000	Call My Name
"Not By The Moon"	2020	64	61	—	*	5	US: 1,000	Dye
"Breath" (넌 날 숨 쉬게 해)	2020	— (Note: "Breath" did not enter the Gaon Digital chart top 200, but peaked at no. 67 on Gaon Download chart.)	—	—	*	8	—N/a	Breath of Love: Last Piece
"Last Piece"	2020	75	—	—	*	10	—N/a	Breath of Love: Last Piece
"Encore"	2021	— (Note: "Encore" did not enter the Gaon Digital chart top 200, but peaked at no. 10 on Gaon Download chart.)	—	—	*	3	—N/a	Non-album single
"Nanana"	2022	87	*	—	*	6	—N/a	Got7
"Python"	2025	123	*	—	*	4	—N/a	Winter Heptagon
"—" denotes releases that did not chart or were not released in that region. '*" denotes chart does not exist at that time.

=== Japanese singles ===
List of Japanese singles, showing year released, selected chart positions, sales figures, and name of the album
Title	Year	Peak chart positions		Sales	Album
Title	Year	JPN	JPN Hot	Sales	Album
"Around the World"	2014	3	4	JPN: 43,426	Moriagatteyo
"Love Train"	2015	4	2	JPN: 37,399	Moriagatteyo
"Laugh Laugh Laugh"	2015	2	3	JPN: 37,038	Moriagatteyo
"My Swagger"	2017	3	1	JPN: 61,305	Non-album singles
"The New Era"	2018	2	1	JPN: 56,257	Non-album singles
"Sing for U"	2019	—	—	—N/a	Non-album singles
"—" denotes releases that did not chart or were not released in that region.

== Other charted songs ==
Title	Year	Peak chart positions			Album
Title	Year	KOR	KOR Hot	US World	Album
"I Like You" (난 니가 좋아)	2014	152	—	—	Got It?
"Follow Me" (따라와)	2014	165	—	—	Got It?
"Forever Young"	2014	172	—	—	Got Love
"Good Tonight"	2014	—	—	18	Got Love
"Gimme"	2014	167	*	—	Identify
"My Whole Body Is Reacting" (온몸이 반응해)	2015	164	*	—	Just Right
"Before the Full Moon Rises" (보름달이 뜨기 전에)	2015	179	*	—	Just Right
"Everyday" (매일)	2015	—	*	22	Mad Winter Edition
"To Star" (이.별)	2015	—	*	21	Mad Winter Edition
"Can't" (못하겠어)	2016	172	*	19	Flight Log: Departure
"Beggin On My Knees"	2016	—	*	24	Flight Log: Departure
"Rewind"	2016	—	*	21	Flight Log: Departure
"Let Me"	2016	189	*	—	Flight Log: Turbulence
"Paradise"	2017	—	*	23	Flight Log: Arrival
"Teenager"	2017	—	—	14	7 for 7
"Sunrise"	2018	—	—	22	Present: You
"Take Me to You"	2018	—	—	14	Present: You & Me
"Come On" (안 보여)	2018	—	—	19	Present: You & Me
"1:31AM" (잘 지내야해)	2018	—	—	18	Present: You & Me
"Think About It"	2018	—	—	24	Present: You & Me
"Thursday"	2019	—	98	—	Call My Name
"Run Away"	2019	—	99	—	Call My Name
"Crash & Burn"	2019	—	100	—	Call My Name
"—" denotes releases that did not chart or were not released in that region. "*" denotes chart does not exist at that time.

== Videography ==
=== Video albums ===
List of video albums, with selected peak chart positions and sales
Title	Details	Peak chart positions			Sales
Title	Details	JPN			Sales
Title	Details	DVD+BD	DVD	BD	Sales
Japan
GOT7 1st Japan Tour 2014 "Around the World" in Makuhari Messe	Released: March 25, 2015 (JPN); Label: Epic, Sony Music Japan; Formats: DVD, Blu-ray	—	—	—	JPN: 4,757
GOT7 Japan Tour 2016 "モリ↑ガッテヨ" in Makuhari Messe	Released: August 3, 2016 (JPN); Label: Epic, Sony Music Japan; Formats: DVD, Blu-ray	—	—	—	JPN: 5,790
GOT7 Arena Special 2017 "My Swagger" in 国立代々木競技場第一体育館	Released: April 25, 2018 (JPN); Label: Epic, Sony Music Japan; Formats: DVD, Blu-ray	5	10	—	JPN: 4,758
GOT7 Japan Tour 2017 "Turn Up" in Nippon Budokan	Released: November 14, 2018 (JPN); Label: Epic, Sony Music Japan; Formats: DVD, Blu-ray	—	1	—	JPN: 4,220
GOT7 Arena Special 2018-2019 "Road 2 U"	Released: October 23, 2019 (JPN); Label: Epic, Sony Music Japan; Formats: DVD, Blu-ray	6	6	6	
Korea
1st Fanmeeting Anniversary 365+	Released: June 29, 2015 (KOR); Label: JYP Entertainment; Formats: DVD	—	—	—	
2nd Fanmeeting Amazing Got7 World	Released: July 14, 2016 (KOR); Label: JYP Entertainment; Formats: DVD	—	—	—	
GOT7 1st Concert Fly in Seoul Final	Released: May 8, 2017 (KOR); Label: JYP Entertainment; Formats: DVD	—	—	—	
3rd Fanmeeting GOT7 ♥︎ IGOT7	Released: September 20, 2017 (KOR); Label: JYP Entertainment; Formats: DVD	—	—	—	
GOT7 2018 World Tour "Eyes On You"	Released: February 1, 2019 (KOR); Label: JYP Entertainment; Formats: DVD, Blu-ray	—	—	—	
5th Fanmeeting GOT7 ♥︎ IGOT7 "Fly Got7"	Released: September 6, 2019 (KOR); Label: JYP Entertainment; Formats: DVD	—	—	—	
GOT7 2019 World Tour "Keep Spinning" in Seoul	Released: March 27, 2020 (KOR); Label: JYP Entertainment; Formats: DVD, Blu-ray	—	—	—	
"—" denotes releases that did not chart or were not released in that region.
