= Moriagatteyo =

- Regular edition cover

Studio album by Got7
- Released: February 3, 2016
- Genre: Pop; R&B; hip hop
- Length: 58:49
- Language: Japanese
- Label: Epic

Got7 chronology
Mad (2015)	Moriagatteyo (2016)	Flight Log: Departure (2016)

Singles from Moriagatteyo
- 1. "Around the World" Released: October 22, 2014; 2. "Love Train" Released: June 10, 2015; 3. "Laugh Laugh Laugh" Released: September 23, 2015

Moriagatteyo (モリ↑ガッテヨ) is the first Japanese studio album (second album overall) by South Korean boy band Got7. It was released on February 3, 2016.

The album ranked #3 on the Oricon Weekly Album Chart, selling 30,167 copies in its release month.

== Description ==
Moriagatteyo includes 12 original Japanese songs, among which the group's singles "Around the World", "Love Train" and "Laugh Laugh Laugh", and the Japanese versions of "Girls Girls Girls" from Got It?, "A" from Got Love, "Stop Stop It" from Identify and "Just Right" from Just Right.

== Track listing ==
No.	Title	Lyrics	Music	Length
1.	"Shaking the World"	Yu Shimoji	Rohan Heath, Danny Kirsch	3:23
2.	"Yo Moriagatte Yo" (Yo モリアガッテ Yo)	Jang Wooyoung, Boytoy, Simon	Jang Wooyoung, Boytoy	3:19
3.	"Got Ur Luv"	Frants, Yu-ki Kokubo	Frants	3:28
4.	"Laugh Laugh Laugh"	IE-MON, DX ISHI, Kdai	IE-MON, DX ISHI, Kdai	3:34
5.	"Be My Girl"	Raphael, Yuhki Shirai	Raphael	3:17
6.	"Around the World"	Komu	Tesung Kim, Jake K, Jimmy Burney	3:40
7.	"Love Train"	Kohei Yokono, Yu-Ki Kokubo, Samuelle Soung	Kohei Yokono, Yu-Ki Kokubo	4:03
8.	"Jibberish"	Komu	Emma Stakes, Obi Mhondera, Tim Hawes, Hamed “K-One” Pirouzpanah	3:57
9.	"O.M.G"	Noday, Ragoon IM, Yuhki Shirai	Noday, Ragoon IM	3:21
10.	"Angel"	Frants, Ryan IM, Yuhki Shirai	Frants, Ryan IM	3:55
11.	"Stay"	Kenji Kabashima	Kenji Kabashima, kosekibeatz	4:50
12.	"So Lucky"	Jun. K, Tamaki Mori	Jun. K, Lel	4:44
13.	"Girls Girls Girls" (Japanese version)	J.Y. Park "The Asiansoul"	J.Y. Park "The Asiansoul"	3:33
14.	"A" (Japanese version)	J.Y. Park "The Asiansoul"	J.Y. Park "The Asiansoul"	3:01
15.	"Stop Stop It" (Japanese version)	J.Y. Park "The Asiansoul"	J.Y. Park "The Asiansoul"	3:18
16.	"Just Right" (Japanese version)	J.Y. Park "The Asiansoul", Charles “Chizzy” Stephens III, Gavin Jones, Steven Battey, Carlos Battey, C Minor, Jay Dmuchowski	Charles “Chizzy” Stephens III, Gavin Jones, Steven Battey, Carlos Battey, C Minor, Jay Dmuchowski	3:26
Total length:				58:49

DVD (type A)
No.	Title	Length
1.	"モリ↑ガッテヨ making movie"
2.	"Around the World" (music video; close-up ver.)
3.	"Girls Girls Girls" (Japanese ver.; music video)
4.	"A" (Japanese ver.; music video)
5.	"Stop Stop It" (Japanese ver.; music video)
6.	"Just Right" (Japanese ver.; music video.)

DVD (type B)
No.	Title	Length
1.	"Got7 Showcase "1st Impact in Japan" in 両国国技館 LIVE"
2.	"Got7 Showcase "1st Impact in Japan" in 両国国技館 Document Movie"
3.	"Got7 1st Japan Tour 2014 "AROUND THE WORLD" Member's TV ～Director's edition～"

== Charts ==
Weekly chart performance for Moriagatteyo
Chart (2016)	Peak position
Japanese Albums (Oricon)	3
Japan Hot Albums (Billboard)	3
