= Never Ever (Got7 song) =

Single by Got7

from the EP Flight Log: Arrival
- Language: Korean
- Released: March 13, 2017
- Length: 3:14
- Label: JYP
- Composers: J.Y. Park "The Asiansoul"; Earattack (HeavyMental); 5$ (HeavyMental); Zomay (HeavyMental); Yoogeun (HeavyMental)
- Lyricists: J.Y. Park "The Asiansoul"; Earattack (HeavyMental); Zomay (HeavyMental); Yoogeun (HeavyMental)

Got7 singles chronology
"Hard Carry" (2016)	"Never Ever" (2017)	"My Swagger" (2017)

Music video
- "Never Ever" on YouTube

"Never Ever" is a song recorded by South Korean boy group Got7 for their sixth extended play Flight Log: Arrival. It was released by JYP Entertainment on March 13, 2017.

Professional ratings
Review scores
Source	Rating
IZM	2.5/5 stars

== Release ==
On March 13, 2015, both "Never Ever" and their sixth EP Flight Log: Arrival were released.

== Composition ==
"Never Ever" lyrics were written by J.Y. Park "The Asiansoul", Earattack (HeavyMental), Zomay (HeavyMental), Yoogeun (HeavyMental) and composed by J.Y. Park "The Asiansoul", Earattack (HeavyMental), $5 (HeavyMental), Zomay (HeavyMental), Yoogeun (HeavyMental). The song is composed in the key F Minor and has 101 beats per minute and a running time of 3 minutes and 14 seconds. "Never Ever" is a hip hop and future song that opens with synthesizer beats and whose theme is a love with a happy ending.

== Promotion ==
On March 16, 2017, Got7 held their first comeback stage for the song on Mnet's M Countdown. SBS's Inkigayo on March 26. SBS M The Show on March 28.

== Accolades ==
Music program awards for "Never Ever"
Program	Date	Ref.
Show Champion	March 22, 2017	
M Countdown	March 23, 2017	
Music Bank	March 24, 2017	
The Show	March 21, 2017	

== Charts ==
=== Weekly charts ===
Weekly chart positions
Chart (2017)	Peak position
South Korea (Gaon)	5
US World Digital Songs (Billboard)	3

=== Monthly charts ===
Chart (March 2017)	Peak position
South Korea (Gaon)	37

== Sales ==
Country	Sales
South Korea (digital)	103,944

== Release history ==
Release history
Region	Date	Format	Label
Various	March 13, 2017	Digital download; streaming	JYP
