= Lullaby (Got7 song) =

Single by Got7

from the album Present: You
- Language: Korean
- Released: September 17, 2018
- Length: 3:37
- Label: JYP
- Composers: Glory Face; Jake K; Jinli
- Lyricist: Jinli

Got7 singles chronology
"Look" (2018)	"Lullaby" (2018)	"Miracle" (2018)

Music video
- "Lullaby" on YouTube

"Lullaby" is a song recorded by South Korean boy group Got7 for their third studio album Present: You. It was released by JYP Entertainment on September 17, 2018.

== Composition ==
"Lullaby" lyrics were written by Jinli and composed by Glory Face, Jake K and Jinli. Tamar Herman of Billboard described "Lullaby" as follows: "A funky house and synth-pop hybrid, the track bounces around between groovy verses before exploding with its bass-heavy chorus, creating a modern-day 'Lullaby' as the group's vocalists let loose with soaring belts, especially Youngjae, Jinyoung and JB." The song is composed in the key C Major and has 130 beats per minute and a running time of 3 minutes and 37 seconds.

== Promotions ==
Got7 performed "Lullaby" on Mnet's M Countdown on September 20 and October 4, 2018. SBS's Inkigayo on September 23 and KBS's Music Bank on September 21 and 28.

== Accolades ==
=== Music program awards ===
Program	Date	Ref.
The Show (SBS M)	September 25, 2018	
Show Champion (MBC M)	September 26, 2018	
Show Champion (MBC M)	October 3, 2018	
M Countdown (Mnet)	September 27, 2018	
M Countdown (Mnet)	October 4, 2018	
Music Bank (KBS)	September 28, 2018	
Music Bank (KBS)	October 5, 2018	
Show! Music Core (MBC)	September 29, 2018	
Inkigayo (SBS)	September 30, 2018	

== Charts ==
Weekly chart positions
Chart (2018)	Peak position
Japan (Japan Hot 100)	94
South Korea (Gaon)	19
South Korea (Kpop Hot 100)	1
US World Digital Songs (Billboard)	2

=== Monthly charts ===
Chart (September 2018)	Peak position
South Korea (Gaon)	91

== Release history ==
Release history for "Lullaby"
Region	Date	Format	Label
Various	September 17, 2018	Digital download; streaming	JYP
