= Fly Tour (Got7) =

2016 concert tour by Got7

GOT7 1st Concert "Fly"
- World tour by Got7
- Location: Asia; North America
- Associated album: Flight Log: Departure
- Start date: April 29, 2016
- End date: August 21, 2016
- Legs: 3
- No. of shows: 14 in Asia; 7 in North America

Got7 concert chronology
- GOT7 Japan Tour "Mori↑Gatte Yo" (2016); Fly Tour (2016)

The Fly Tour was the first world tour by South Korean boy band Got7. The tour commenced one month before the release of the group's fifth mini album, Flight Log: Departure, and was held between April and August 2016 kicking off in Seoul, and onwards to Osaka, Tokyo, Bangkok, Guangzhou, Singapore, Dallas, Chicago, New York, Atlanta, Los Angeles, Hong Kong, and then finishing in Seoul once again.

== Background ==
On February 26, 2016, Got7 released a comeback schedule for their mini album Flight Log: Departure, with the album and music video set for a March 21 release. They also announced their first concert tour Fly which will be held in Seoul, United States of America, China, Thailand, Singapore, and Japan. Total available seats for confirmed concerts will be 103,985 seats.

== Tour dates ==
Date	City	Country	Venue	Attendance
Asia
April 29, 2016	Seoul	South Korea	SK Olympic Handball Gymnasium	8,000
April 30, 2016	Seoul	South Korea	SK Olympic Handball Gymnasium	8,000
May 8, 2016	Shanghai	China	Shanghai Indoor Stadium	7,000
May 14, 2016	Osaka	Japan	Osaka International Convention Center	5,200
May 15, 2016	Osaka	Japan	Osaka International Convention Center	5,200
June 1, 2016	Tokyo	Japan	NHK Hall	8,000
June 2, 2016	Tokyo	Japan	NHK Hall	8,000
June 11, 2016	Bangkok	Thailand	Impact Arena	22,000
June 12, 2016	Bangkok	Thailand	Impact Arena	22,000
June 18, 2016	Guangzhou	China	Guangzhou Gymnasium	10,000
June 24, 2016	Singapore		Suntec Singapore Convention & Exhibition Centre	4,500
North America
July 1, 2016	Grand Prairie	United States	Verizon Theatre	4,435
July 3, 2016	Rosemont	United States	Rosemont Theatre	4,400
July 5, 2016	New York City	United States	PlayStation Theater	4,200
July 6, 2016	New York City	United States	PlayStation Theater	4,200
July 8, 2016	Atlanta	United States	Cobb Energy Performing Arts Centre	2,750
July 10, 2016	Los Angeles	United States	The Novo by Microsoft	4,600
July 11, 2016	Los Angeles	United States	The Novo by Microsoft	4,600
Asia
July 30, 2016	Hong Kong	China	AsiaWorld–Arena	7,000
August 20, 2016	Seoul	South Korea	Korea University Hwajung Gymnasium	12,000
August 21, 2016	Seoul	South Korea	Korea University Hwajung Gymnasium	12,000

== Personnel ==
- Artists
  - Mark, JB, Jackson, Jinyoung, Youngjae, BamBam and Yugyeom
- Tour organizer
  - JYP Entertainment
- Tour promoter
  - 4NOLOGUE (Thailand)
  - One Production (Singapore)
  - SubKulture Entertainment (USA)
- Ticketing partners
  - Interpark (South Korea)
  - Thaiticketmajor (Thailand)
