= A (Got7 song) =

Single by Got7

from the EP Got Love
- Language: Korean
- Released: June 23, 2014
- Length: 3:01
- Label: JYP
- Composer: Park Jin-young
- Lyricist: Park Jin-young

Got7 singles chronology
"Girls Girls Girls" (2014)	"A" (2014)	"Stop Stop It" (2014)

Music video
- "A" on YouTube

"A" is a song recorded by South Korean boy group Got7 for their second extended play Got Love. It was released by JYP Entertainment on June 23, 2014.

== Background and release ==
On June 5, 2014, JYP Entertainment announced that Got7 would release a EP on June 23 and a one-night fan showcase on June 18, prior to the release. On June 23, 2014, both "A" and their second EP Got Love were released.

== Composition ==
"A" was written and composed by JYP Entertainment founder Park Jin-young and produced by Noday. The song is composed in the key G Minor and has 103 beats per minute and a running time of 3 minutes and 30 seconds. The song is a song that compares the expression 'A~' to the English alphabet 'A' when the other person knows the other person's inner feelings and hides his inner feelings. It is an uptempo R&B song made by attaching hip-hop rhythm to R&B.

== Promotion ==
On June 19, 2014, Got7 held their first comeback stage for the song on Mnet's M Countdown.

== Music video ==
The music video was directed by Kim Young-jo and Yoo Joon-seok of Naive Creative Production, the music video has since reached over a hundred million views and features fellow label mate Sana as the female lead, before she debuted as a member of Twice. The music video was filmed in Malaysia, in the video the members transformed into the cute stalker of their favorite female student. Got7 go to the fast food restaurant where their favorite female student works, the street, and the mart she went to.

== Charts ==
=== Weekly charts ===
Weekly chart positions
Chart (2014)	Peak position
South Korea (Gaon)	16
South Korea (K-pop Hot 100	31
US World Digital Songs (Billboard)	5

=== Monthly charts ===
Chart (July 2014)	Peak position
South Korea (Gaon)	59

== Sales ==
Country	Sales
South Korea (digital)	206,068

== Publication list ==
"A" on listicles
Publication	List	Rank	Ref.
Billboard	25 Top Viewed 2014 K-Pop Videos in America	14	

== Release history ==
Release history for "A"
Region	Date	Format	Label
Various	June 23, 2014	Digital download	JYP
