= Breath of Love: Last Piece =

2020 studio album by Got7

- Digital cover

Studio album by Got7
- Released: November 30, 2020
- Recorded: 2020
- Studios: JYPE Studios; Vibe Music Studio 606
- Genres: K-pop; Hip-hop; R&B; Dance
- Length: 32:39
- Language: Korean
- Label: JYP
- Producers: Jackson Wang; Joo Chan-yang; Lavin; Nathan; Zayson; RoseInPeace; Earattack; Gong-do; Boytoy; Ludwig Lindell; Psycho Tension; Ralz; Laconic; Arcades

Got7 chronology
Dye (2020)	Breath of Love: Last Piece (2020)	Got7 (2022)

Singles from Breath of Love: Last Piece
- 1. "Breath" Released: November 23, 2020; 2. "Last Piece" Released: November 30, 2020

Breath of Love: Last Piece is the fourth Korean studio album by the South Korean boy band Got7. It was released on November 30, 2020 under JYP Entertainment, and features two title tracks, "Breath" and "Last Piece", as well as songs composed by all the members. The album serves as their last release under JYP Entertainment following their decision to leave the company after the expiration of their contract in January 2021.

== Background and release ==
Breath of Love: Last Piece was announced on November 9, 2020, with the album release set for November 30 after pre-releasing the single "Breath". The group photo teasers were released between November 10 and 12, while the tracklist was unveiled on November 13. From November 16 to 28, Got7 released members' photo teasers, "Breath" and "Last Piece" music video teasers, and the seven covers of the record. The album spoiler was revealed on November 29.

== Composition ==
Breath of Love: Last Piece is a record dedicated to the fans, with which Got7 talks to them about some new stories and the things they would like to do together. The leitmotif is love in its various stages, whether it is heartbreak or falling in love, and carries a message of personal reflection explored by each member's perspective.

The first title track "Breath", published on November 23, is a hip-hop song expressing the emotion felt on the moment you meet your fateful partner, and the feeling of being overwhelmed by love is embodied by various sounds, such as the whistle. "Breath" was written and composed by Youngjae with Joo Chan-yang, Lavin and NiiHwa, with the intent to show "Got7's fresh charm" and to highlight the synergy of the members and the individuality of each one; the overall theme of the song was developed in homage to the fans, who, like the Korean title of the song (Korean: 넌 날 숨 쉬게 해; RR: Neon nal sum swige hae; lit. 'You make me breathe'), "make me feel alive and breathing, and are the reason why I sing". Through the lyrics, the singer asks his beloved to remember only the moment they met because he doesn't want to try to imagine the end of their relationship, capturing the essence of an ethereal love.

"Last Piece", the second title track, expresses Got7's powerful side, incorporating distorted notes of electric guitar and synthesizer into the melody. It was written and composed by JB with the Offshore crew thinking about what it would feel like to lose the part of oneself that allows to live. The lyrics identifies the loved one as the missing piece to become complete, and also refers, in the verse, "like an abandoned playground" (버려진 놀이터처럼; Beoryeojin noriteocheoreom) to the song "Playground" from Got7's debut extended play. In the music video, Youngjae appears only at the last chorus indicating that the group is complete only when together.

Future bass song "Born Ready" passionately declares "I am ready to love you since I was born", while "Special", in which the boys sing about how being in love with that "special" person makes everything seem better, is aimed at those who have always supported and loved the group. After "Special", the album slows down. In R&B track "Wave", the group sings that, although life flows like the waves of the sea, you can bear it with your loved one by your side, communicating a message of strong commitment. The wave is also used to represent a troubled heart. "Waiting For You" expresses the emptiness and longing after a breakup, combining a melancholic piano with trap music, and "Thank You, Sorry" the will to improve oneself after realizing that the lover has changed, expressing at the same time the wish that they are happy, with sad and nostalgic tones. The track combines the electric guitar, which starts in the background and gets louder little by little, with a jazz vibe.

"1+1" takes inspiration from jazz music, too, and speaks of loving only one person who seems to have been decided by destiny. On the other hand, "I Mean It" conveys the feelings of love in a direct way, and "We Are Young" that you will always love without regret.

== Critical reception ==
Breath of Love: Last Piece was positively received by critics, who appreciated its ability to "emphasize the group's growth through their musical journey since 2014" and the maturation of its "signature blend of dance-pop and hip-hop flair" spanning across different genres, while looking not disarranged, but smooth and cohesive. It was also noted how the album displays the true colors and talents of the members and of the group.

For The Honey Pop, "this might be one of their best releases and one of the most interesting sound-wise as well. [...] Overall, this is an album that shows so many sides of Got7 as a group and as individuals." Denver Del Rosario for Philippine Daily Inquirer deemed it "a more polished and thought-out production" than Present: You, observing that Got7 "is just undeniably better when allowed to run wild and explore." Ashlee Mitchel in Teen Vogue stated that Breath of Love: Last Piece "is a reflection of the amazing artistry fostered by a genuine and hard-working unit of individuals free to be themselves, with songs that are sincere, fun, and dynamic." Writing for The Line of Best Fit, Nathan Sartain closed his review with "whilst [it] may not be a linear pop, permanently rousing release, it never pretends to be, and succeeds instead in its unabating dedication to consistent intrigue."

== Track listing ==
No.	Title	Lyrics	Music	Arrangement	Length
1.	"Breath" (넌 날 숨 쉬게 해)	Joo Chan-yang; Lavin; NiiHwa; Ars	Joo Chan-yang; Lavin; Ars; NiiHwa	Joo Chan-yang; Lavin	03:08
2.	"Last Piece"	Defsoul; Jomalxne; D.ham (220 Volt)	Defsoul; iHwak; Munhan Mirror (220 Volt); Jomalxne; Zayson; RoseInPeace; Mirror Boy (220 Volt)	Zayson; RoseInPeace	03:43
3.	"Born Ready"	Earattack; Mark	Earattack; Mark	Earattack; Gong-do	02:40
4.	"Special"	Jackson; Boytoy; Young Sky	Jackson; Boytoy; Young Sky	Jackson; Boytoy	03:27
5.	"Wave"	Jinyoung; Distract	Jinyoung; Distract; Ludwig Lindell	Ludwig Lindell	03:15
6.	"Waiting For You"	BamBam; Psycho Tension (Jung Sung-min, Shin Yong-soo)	Bambam; Psycho Tension (Jung Sung-min)	Psycho Tension (Wayco)	02:55
7.	"Thank You, Sorry" (이젠 내가 할게)	Yugyeom; Nathan	Yugyeom; Nathan	Nathan	03:44
8.	"1+1"	Oh Min-joo (Jamfactory)	Ylva Dimberg; Gesture (Prismfilter); Resmus Gregersen	Ralz	03:15
9.	"I Mean It"	Ji Yoo-ri (Jamfactory); Oh Min-joo (Jamfactory); Jake Torrey; Noah Conrad; Dan Goudie; Ash Milton	Jake Torrey; Noah Conrad; Dan Goudie; Ash Milton	Laconic	03:01
10.	"We Are Young"	Danke (Lalala Studio)	Christian Fast; Ninos Hanna; Matt Thomson; Max Graham; James F. Reynolds	Arcades	03:31
Total length:					32:39

== Charts ==
Chart performance for Breath of Love: Last Piece
Chart (2020)	Peak position
Japan Hot Albums (Billboard)	86
South Korean Albums (Gaon)	3
UK Digital Albums (OCC)	77
US Heatseekers Albums (Billboard)	4
US World Albums (Billboard)	7
