= Around the World (Got7 song) =

Single by Got7

from the album Moriagatteyo
- B-side: "So Lucky"
- Released: October 22, 2014
- Recorded: 2014
- Genre: EDM, dancepop
- Label: Epic
- Songwriters: Jimmy Burney, Jake K, Tadashi Komura (Komu), David Kim Tae-sung

Got7 singles chronology
"A" (2014)	"Around the World" (2014)	"'Stop Stop It'" (2014)

"Around the World" is the debut Japanese single album by South Korean boy group Got7, released on October 22, 2014 by Epic Records Japan. Around the World debuted at number three on the weekly Oricon Daily Singles Chart, staying in top 5 for five days before rising at number two, while it entered the weekly chart at number three.

It sold 40,431 copies in October 2014 and was the best-selling debut single by a K-pop artist in Japan between 2013 and 2014.

== Background and release ==
The song "Around the World" was released on September 29, 2014 with a short music video, while the single album was published on October 22. "Around the World" is a dance-EDM song, while the B-side track "So Lucky" was written and composed by 2PM's Jun. K. It was released in three physical versions: version A, a CD+DVD version with a music video and an off-shot video; version B, another CD+DVD version with the music video and dance practice behind-the-scenes; and version C, a CD only version.

== Track listing ==
Disc 1
No.	Title	Lyrics	Music	Length
1.	"Around the World"	Komu	Kim Tae-sung; Jake K; Jimmy Burney	3:57
2.	"So Lucky"	Jun. K; Tamaki Mori	Jun. K; LeL	4:08
3.	"Around the World" (Inst.)		Kim Tae-sung; Jake K; Jimmy Burney	3:57
4.	"So Lucky" (Inst.)		Jun. K; LeL	4:08

== Charts ==
Chart (2014)	Peak position
Japanese Daily Singles (Oricon)	2
Japanese Weekly Singles (Oricon)	3
Japan Hot 100 (Billboard Japan)	4
