= Confession Song =

Single by Got7

from the EP Mad Winter Edition
- Language: Korean
- Released: November 23, 2015
- Length: 3:33
- Label: JYP
- Composer: Park Jin-young
- Lyricist: Park Jin-young

Got7 singles chronology
"If You Do" (2015)	"Confession Song" (2015)	"Fly" (2016)

Music video
- "Confession Song" on YouTube

"Confession Song" is a song recorded by South Korean boy group Got7 for their reissued EP Mad Winter Edition. It was their first holiday single, and was released by JYP Entertainment on November 23, 2015.

== Background and release ==
On November 19, 2015, JYP Entertainment first teased Got7 first holiday single with a one-minute cartoon video of Got7 members entitled 'GOTOON'. The song and reissued EP Mad Winter Edition were both released on November 23, 2015.

== Composition ==
"Confession Song" was written and composed by JYP Entertainment founder Park Jin-young. The song is composed in the key A-major and has 94 beats per minute and a running time of 3 minutes and 33 seconds.

== Promotion ==
On December 25, Got7 held their first and only comeback stage for the song on KBS's Music Bank, as the only live performance of the song's music show promotion.

== Music video ==
The music video, which is set in a school auditorium, shows the members of Got7 transform into 'Confession Santa' for students who are heartbroken by unrequited love with Got7 then helping students attract attention. It is directed by Kim Young-jo and Yoo Joon-seok of Naive Creative Production.

== Charts ==
Weekly chart positions
Chart (2015)	Peak position
South Korea (Gaon)	34
US World Digital Songs (Billboard)	5

== Sales ==
Country	Sales
South Korea (digital)	43,931

== Release history ==
Release history for "Confession Song"
Region	Date	Format	Label
Various	November 23, 2015	Digital download	JYP
