= Just Right (song) =

Single by Got7

from the EP Just Right
- Language: Korean
- Released: July 13, 2015
- Length: 3:43
- Label: JYP
- Composers: Carlos Battey; Steven Battey; Gavin Jones; Charles "Chizzy"; Stephens III; Timothy "C Minor" Zimnoch; Jay Dmuchowski
- Lyricist: J.Y. Park "The Asiansoul"

Got7 singles chronology
"Stop Stop It" (2014)	"Just Right" (2015)	"If You Do" (2015)

Music video
- "Just Right" on YouTube

"Just Right" is a song recorded by South Korean boy group Got7 for their third extended play Just Right. It was released by JYP Entertainment on July 13, 2015.

== Background and release ==
JYP Entertainment first started to tease the song with concept photos beginning on June 29, 2015, on July 12, they released a teaser video with previews of the songs from the EP. On July 13, 2015, both "Just Right" and their third EP Just Right were released.

== Composition ==
"Just Right" lyrics were written by Park Jin-young, and composed by Carlos Battey, Steven Battey, Gavin Jones, Charles "Chizzy" , Stephens III, Timothy "C Minor" Zimnoch and Jay Dmuchowski. "Just Right" is a song that combines a southern hiphop rhythm and a pop melody. It is a song of a guy who wants to install confidence into his girlfriend, who is always full of worries.

The song is composed in the key B Minor and has 96 beats per minute and a running time of 3 minutes and 43 seconds.

== Promotion ==
Got7 held their first comeback stage for "Just Right" on Mnet M Countdown on July 16. Got7 also performed on three other music programs in the first week of promotion: Music Bank on July 17 Show! Music Core, on July 18, and SBS's Inkigayo on July 19.

== Charts ==
=== Weekly charts ===
Weekly chart positions
Chart (2015)	Peak position
South Korea (Gaon)	20
US World Digital Songs (Billboard)	3

=== Monthly charts ===
Chart (July 2015)	Peak position
South Korea (Gaon)	52

== Publication lists ==
Publication lists for "Just Right"
Critic/Publication	List	Rank	Ref.
Dazed	The Top 20 K-pop Tracks of 2015	2	
Rolling Stone	100 Greatest Songs in the History of Korean Pop Music	78	
Vice	The Top 20 K-pop Songs of 2015	3	

== Sales ==
Country	Sales
South Korea (digital)	211,444

== Release history ==
Release history for "Just Right"
Region	Date	Format	Label
Various	July 13, 2015	Digital download	JYP
