= Girls Girls Girls (Got7 song) =

Single by Got7

from the EP Got It?
- Language: Korean
- Released: January 20, 2014
- Length: 3:34
- Label: JYP
- Composer: Park Jin-young
- Lyricist: Park Jin-young

Got7 singles chronology
"Girls Girls Girls" (2014)	"A" (2014)

Music video
- "Girls Girls Girls" on YouTube

"Girls Girls Girls" is a song recorded by South Korean boy group Got7 for their first extended play Got It?. It was released by JYP Entertainment on January 20, 2014.

== Background and release ==
On January 1, 2014 JYP Entertainment first announced that they will be debuting a new boy group Got7, the first since 2PM in 2008. On January 20, 2014, Got7 debuted with the song "Girls Girls Girls" and their first EP Got It?.

== Composition ==
"Girls Girls Girls" was written and composed by JYP Entertainment founder Park Jin-young. The song is composed in the key A-sharp minor and has 90 beats per minute and a running time of 3 minutes and 34 seconds. The song is described as being an hip hop and electropop song and contains a sample of the exclamation "eomona" from Wonder Girls' song "Tell Me".

== Promotion ==
Got7 held their first stage for "Girls Girls Girls" on Mnet M Countdown on January 16. The music video was released on January 14, 2014. They performed on SBS's Inkigayo on January 19 and January 26, Music Bank on January 24 and February 7. Show! Music Core On February 8.

== Charts ==
=== Weekly charts ===
Weekly chart positions
Chart (2014)	Peak position
South Korea (Gaon)	21
South Korea (K-pop Hot 100)	36
US World Digital Songs (Billboard)	8

=== Monthly charts ===
Monthly chart performance for "Girls Girls Girls"
Chart (January 2014)	Peak position
South Korea (Gaon)	72

== Sales ==
Country	Sales
South Korea (digital)	194,534

== Release history ==
Release history for "Girls Girls Girls"
Region	Date	Format	Label
Various	January 20, 2014	Digital download	JYP
