= Fly (Got7 song) =

Single by Got7

from the EP Flight Log: Departure
- Language: Korean
- Released: March 21, 2016
- Length: 3:12
- Label: JYP
- Composers: Earattack; The Kick Sound
- Lyricists: Earattack; The Kick Sound

Got7 singles chronology
"Confession Song" (2015)	"Fly" (2016)	"Home Run" (2016)

Music video
- "Fly" on YouTube

"Fly" is a song recorded by South Korean boy group Got7 for their fifth extended play Flight Log: Departure. It was released by JYP Entertainment on March 21, 2016.

Professional ratings
Review scores
Source	Rating
IZM	2/5 stars

== Background and release ==
On February 28, 2016, JYP Entertainment first announced that Got7 will have a comeback when they released a poster of the schedule and timeline. The day later they revealed the track-list. On March 21, 2016, both "Fly" and their fifth EP Flight Log: Departure were released.

== Composition ==
"Fly" was written, composed and arranged by Earattack as well as being written and composed by The Kick Sound and arrangement also by OhBros and 5$. The song is composed in the key G Major and has 133 beats per minute and a running time of 3 minutes and 12 seconds. The song speaks of a pure and discreet love, combining funk and hip hop over a trap base. The chorus, characterized by falsetto, mixes synths and electronic music.

== Promotion ==
On March 24, 2016, Got7 held their first comeback stage for the song on Mnet's M Countdown. They also performed on Show! Music Core on March 26 and SBS's Inkigayo on April 3.

== Charts ==
Weekly chart positions
Chart (2016)	Peak position
South Korea (Gaon)	9
US World Digital Songs (Billboard)	2

=== Monthly charts ===
Chart (March 2016)	Peak position
South Korea (Gaon)	57

== Sales ==
Country	Sales
South Korea (digital)	123,062

== Accolades ==
Music program awards for "Fly"
Program	Date	Ref.
Inkigayo	April 3, 2016	
M Countdown	March 31, 2016	
Music Bank	April 1, 2016	
Show Champion	March 30, 2016	
The Show	March 29, 2016	
The Show	April 5, 2016	

== Release history ==
Release history for "Fly"
Region	Date	Format	Label
Various	March 21, 2016	Digital download	JYP
