= Stop Stop It =

Single by Got7

from the album Identify
- Language: Korean
- Released: November 17, 2014
- Length: 3:17
- Label: JYP
- Composer: Park Jin-young
- Lyricist: Park Jin-young

Got7 singles chronology
"A" (2014)	"Stop Stop It" (2014)	"Just Right" (2015)

Music video
- "Stop Stop It" on YouTube

"Stop Stop It" is a song recorded by South Korean boy group Got7 for their first studio album Identify. It was released by JYP Entertainment on November 17, 2014.

== Release ==
On November 17, 2014, the single "Stop Stop It" was released and their first studio album Identify was released the day later.

== Composition ==
"Stop Stop It" was written and composed by JYP Entertainment founder Park Jin-young. The song is composed in the key G Major and has 178 beats per minute and a running time of 3 minutes and 17 seconds. The song's genre is hip-hop and talks about a man who wants to confess his love but is unable to, thus singing his sadness.

== Promotion ==
On November 20, 2014, Got7 held their first comeback stage for the song on Mnet's M Countdown. They also performed on Music Bank on November 21 and SBS's Inkigayo on November 23.

== Music video ==
The music video was directed by Kim Young-jo and Yoo Joon-seok of Naive Creative Production, the music video is about a boy's confused heart about the girl he liked, in a fantasy while going back and forth between the present and the future. It features member Jay B as the male lead and fellow label mate Dahyun as the female lead, before she debuted as a member of Twice.

== Charts ==
=== Weekly charts ===
Weekly chart positions
Chart (2014)	Peak position
South Korea (Gaon)	25
US World Digital Songs (Billboard)	4

=== Monthly charts ===
Chart (November 2014)	Peak position
South Korea (Gaon)	64

== Sales ==
Country	Sales
South Korea (digital)	138,480

== Release history ==
Release history for "Stop Stop It"
Region	Date	Format	Label
Various	November 17, 2014	Digital download	JYP
