= If You Do =

Single by Got7

from the EP Mad
- Language: Korean
- Released: September 30, 2015
- Length: 3:31
- Label: JYP
- Composer: Rado of Black Eyed Pilseung
- Lyricist: Sam Lewis

Got7 singles chronology
"Just Right" (2015)	"If You Do" (2015)	"Confession Song" (2015)

Music video
- "If You Do" on YouTube

"If You Do" is a song recorded by South Korean boy group Got7 for their fourth extended play Mad. It was released by JYP Entertainment on September 30, 2015.

== Release ==
On September 30, 2015, both "If You Do" and their fourth EP Mad were released.

== Composition ==
"If You Do" lyrics Sam Lewis and composed by Rado of Black Eyed Pilseung. The song is composed in the key A-flat Major and has 130 beats per minute and a running time of 3 minutes and 31 seconds. "If You Do" presents the image of a man who has become weak in the face of love, with angry lines such as "But every day I fall to my knees" (하지만 매일 난 무릎 꿇었어) and "You pushed me down off a cliff" (날 절벽으로 밀어 부쳤어), and a melancholy sound.

== Promotion ==
On October 1, 2015, Got7 held their first comeback stage for the song on Mnet's M Countdown. They also performed on MBC's Show! Music Core on October 3 and SBS' Inkigayo on October 4.

== Accolades ==
Music program awards for "If You Do"
Program	Date
The Show	October 6, 2015
The Show	October 13, 2015
The Show	October 20, 2015

Awards and nominations for "If You Do"
Organization	Year	Award	Result	Ref.
Mnet Asian Music Awards	2015	Best Dance Performance	Nominated	

== Publication list ==
"If You Do" on critic lists
Publication	List	Rank	Ref.
Billboard	The 100 Greatest K-pop Songs of the 2010s	95	

== Charts ==
=== Weekly charts ===
Weekly chart positions
Chart (2015)	Peak position
South Korea (Gaon)	9

=== Monthly charts ===
Chart (October 2015)	Peak position
South Korea (Gaon)	51

== Sales ==
Country	Sales
South Korea (digital)	150,499

== Release history ==
Release history for "If You Do"
Region	Date	Format	Label
Various	September 30, 2015	Digital download	JYP
