= Got7 (EP) =

EP by Got7
- Released: May 23, 2022
- Genre: K-pop
- Length: 20:11
- Language: Korean
- Label: Warner Korea

Got7 chronology
Breath of Love: Last Piece (2020)	Got7 (2022)	Winter Heptagon (2025)

Singles from Got7
- 1. "Nanana" Released: May 23, 2022

Got7 is the twelfth Korean-language extended play (EP) (sixteenth overall) by South Korean boy band Got7. It was released on May 23, 2022, through Warner Music Korea. It is the group's first album since Breath of Love: Last Piece (2020), and after their departure from JYP Entertainment in January 2021. The EP consists of six tracks, including the lead single "Nanana". Before the release, the group held Got7 Homecoming 2022 FanCon on May 21–22 at SK Olympic Handball Gymnasium.

== Background and release ==
After the expiration of their contract with JYP Entertainment on January 19, 2021 and the release of the single "Encore" a month later, the members of Got7 focused on solo activities for one year and three months in different companies. Immediately after leaving the previous label, they began working on a new album, which was conceived via FaceTime, video calls, messages and online meetings, given the move of Jackson Wang to China and Mark Tuan to the United States, and the restrictions on meetings dictated by the COVID-19 pandemic in South Korea.

Due to overlapping overseas schedules, Mark, Jackson and BamBam were unable to produce songs for the album, but participated in the other decision-making phases regarding the idea, logo, design and concept. The songs were blindly selected from the collected demos, making the choice fall on songs composed by the members of the group: of the six final tracks, Jay B is the writer and composer of three, among which the title track "Nanana"; Youngjae of one and Yugyeom of two, including "Don't Care About Me" in collaboration with Jinyoung. The making of the EP, the recording of the songs and the shooting of the music video took three months.

On April 22, 2022, JoyNews24 reported that the group was in the final stages of an album and would return to the music scene in May. On May 6, Warner Music Korea launched new social media accounts and a new logo for the group, accompanied by the phrase "Got7 is our name"; three days later, it announced the release of the homonymous EP Got7 and the music video of the song "Nanana" for May 23, 2022. The initial intention was to publish the album by the end of 2021, but it was postponed to match the schedules of all members.

== Composition ==
Got7 chose to use their name as the title of the album because they wanted to remember their roots as a boy band under JYP Entertainment, and at the same time wished to rebrand and release music that fully represented them, leaving the past behind. The concept was rendered graphically through references to construction, to symbolize the new house that Got7 have built for themselves and for the fandom, the latter symbolized by the green color of the record. At the same time, the members chose "Nanana" as the title track because, in the past, the music with which they had shone the most on stage was produced by Jay B: they therefore felt that, by returning with a song written by him, they could show their true color.

Through an organic and chronological progression, Got7 tells the story of the group from the first meeting with the fans. As it conveys appreciation for them and contains music that the group knows the fans would like, Got7 declared it would have made no difference if they titled the album with the name of their fandom, IGot7.

"Truth" is an R&B song with rap parts about the first steps a couple takes when they get to know each other, while "Drive Me to the Moon" tells that Got7 can do anything with the fans by their side, even reach the Moon. "Nanana" is a cheerful and cool song that combines synth-pop, R&B, trap and guitar loops, with which Got7 wants to bring a laugh to fans and general public, and has a more relaxed and rich sound compared to the group's previous title tracks. "Two" tells of the sadness of trying to forget a lover in vain, and sees Got7 making use of a low vocal register in the chorus. "Don't Care About Me" is a dance song that encompasses the feelings towards the fans by communicating that, regardless of the road and the obstacles ahead, everything will be fine if they are together. The EP is closed by "Don't Leave Me Alone", which expresses the wish that fans will not forget the group when the members return to their solo activities, reassuring that, in the future, they will release new music.

== Critical reception ==
Bollywood Hungama defined Got7 "a triumphant return to their roots" and concluded its review with "Sticking to the familiar R&B tones and smooth techno beats, Got7 eased into the group's music style with a renewed sense of their artistry and more nuanced approach towards it."

"Nanana" was featured on Teen Vogue's and Cosmopolitan's best K-pop songs of 2022 lists, and on Bandwagon's best songs of 2022 list. At the end of the year, Tamar Herman commented for Variety: "While a boy band releasing an album is par for the K-pop course, Got7 is notable for showing a seamless shift from being an idol group under a South Korean entertainment company to self-managed artists. It set a new standard for the industry, diverging from the contract disputes or artistic rebranding that other now-independent K-pop groups have faced."

== Commercial performance ==
According to the Gaon Chart, Got7 sold 187,481 copies on the first day and 320,978 in the first week. According to the Hanteo Chart, it sold about 370,000 copies until May 29. In Japan, it sold 1,466 copies.

The album debuted at No. 2 on the Gaon Weekly Album Chart; "Nanana" entered the Digital Chart at No. 87 and the Download Chart at No. 4. The other tracks also entered the Download Chart ranking between 165 and 199. On July 7, 2022, it was certified double platinum in South Korea, having sold more than 500,000 copies.

Upon release, Got7 topped the iTunes Albums Chart in 83 countries, climbing to 95 in two days and making Got7 the second K-pop group to surpass 90 first places on the iTunes Albums Chart.

== Track listing ==
Got7 track listing
No.	Title	Lyrics	Music	Arrangement	Length
1.	"Truth"	Def.; Leon; iHwak	Def.; iHwak; HRDR; Leon	HRDR	3:06
2.	"Drive Me to the Moon"	Ars; Kim Hye-su	Ars; Boytoy (Blatinum); Disko (Blatinum); Brite Me; ADN Lewis	Ars; Boytoy; Disko	3:26
3.	"Nanana"	Def.; iHwak	Def.; iHwak; Royal Dive	Royal Dive	3:07
4.	"Two"	Yugyeom; Distract	Yugyeom; Distract; Dr.Ahn	Dr.Ahn	3:15
5.	"Don't Care About Me"	Jinyoung; Yugyeom	Distract; Jinyoung; Yugyeom; Ludwig Lindell	Lindell	3:11
6.	"Don't Leave Me Alone"	Def.; iHwak	Def.; iHwak; Royal Dive	Royal Dive	4:06
Total length:					20:11

== Charts ==
=== Weekly charts ===
Weekly chart performance for Got7
Chart (2022)	Peak position
Australian Digital Albums (ARIA)	3
Belgian Albums (Ultratop Flanders)	124
Hungarian Albums (MAHASZ)	40
Japanese Albums (Oricon)	38
Japanese Hot Albums (Billboard Japan)	43
South Korean Albums (Gaon)	2
Swiss Albums (Schweizer Hitparade)	27
UK Album Downloads (Official Charts)	14
US Heatseekers Albums (Billboard)	11
US World Albums (Billboard)	8

=== Monthly charts ===
Monthly chart performance for Got7
Chart (2022)	Peak position
South Korean Albums (Gaon)	6

=== Year-end charts ===
Year-end chart performance for Got7
Chart (2022)	Position
South Korean Albums (Circle)	38
