= Flight Log: Turbulence =

- Digital cover

Studio album by Got7
- Released: September 27, 2016
- Recorded: 2016
- Genres: K-pop; hip hop; R&B; dance; trap
- Length: 45:22
- Label: JYP Entertainment
- Producer: J.Y. Park "The Asiansoul"

Got7 chronology
Flight Log: Departure (2016)	Flight Log: Turbulence (2016)	Flight Log: Arrival (2017)

Singles from Flight Log: Turbulence
- 1. "Hard Carry" Released: September 27, 2016

Flight Log: Turbulence is the second Korean studio album by the South Korean male group Got7. It was released on September 27, 2016 by JYP Entertainment.

== Background and composition ==
On September 8, 2016, JYP Entertainment announced that Got7 was going to release their second Korean studio album by early October. Flight Log: Turbulence was ultimately released on September 27 and introduced a more aggressive, electronic sound than the group's previous hip hop style. The members have written the lyrics, and sometimes composed, eleven of the thirteen tracks, with Mark credited on five of them.

"Hard Carry" is an electronic song featuring "whirring synths, finger snaps, layered vocal samples and howls," which Billboard called a "sonic whirlwind." The album's middle section continues with songs written by the members: "Boom x3" has an old-school hip hop style, with 8-bit blips, while "Prove It" is R&B-oriented. The title of "No Jam" is a wordplay between English and Korean, translating to "no fun." "Who's That" reintroduces a more playful, tropical beat; the album closes with four softer, sweeter tracks, including "If," which deals with the push and pull of courtship.

== Critical reception ==
Tamar Herman of Billboard noted that overall, the strength of Flight Log: Turbulence lied in "the personalized quality of the songs," as all members participated in the creation of the album, showing their potential as composers. Idology felt that "Hard Carry" was a song "so well-crafted that it's hard to find fault with it," but that it was also disconnected from previous releases, commenting that the album demonstrated the group's attempt to consistently seek new paths.

== Track listing ==
No.	Title	Lyrics	Music	Arrangements	Length
1.	"Skyway"	Earattack, Defsoul (JB)	Earattack, Lish, Defsoul (JB), The Kick Sound	Earattack, Lish, The Kick Sound	3:37
2.	"하드캐리" (Hard Carry)	Earattack, Yoogeun	Earattack, Lish, Yoogeun	Earattack, Lish	3:13
3.	"Boom x3"	Jackson Wang, Boytoy, Penomeco	Jackson Wang, Boytoy	Boytoy	3:31
4.	"Prove It"	Defsoul (JB)	Defsoul (JB), 220, Royal Dive	220, Royal Dive	2:54
5.	"노잼" (No Jam)	Yugyeom, Mark, Frants, BamBam, Jackson Wang	Yugyeom, Frants, Mark	Frants	3:34
6.	"HEY"	Kim Won, Ars (Youngjae), Oh Hyunjoo	Kim Won, Ars (Youngjae)	Kim Won	3:29
7.	"Mayday"	Jinyoung	Jinyoung, Distract, Secret Weapon	Secret Weapon	3:33
8.	"My Home"	Earattack, Mark	Earattack, Lish, Mark	Earattack, Lish	3:27
9.	"Who's That"	Jam Factory	Ruwanga Samath, Oscar Doniz, Josiah Rosen, Carlos Battey, Steven Battey	Ruwanga Samath	3:35
10.	"만약에" (If)	Primeboi, BamBam, Mark	Primeboi, Cash Note	Primeboi	3:29
11.	"아파" (Sick)	Ars (Youngjae), Mark (rap parts), Jackson Wang (rap parts)	Damon Sharpe, Carlos Battey, Gregg Pagani	Damon Sharpe, Carlos Battey, Gregg Pagani	4:17
12.	"니꿈꿔" (Dreamin')	Earattack, Defsoul (JB), BamBam	Earattack, Defsoul (JB)	Earattack	3:08
13.	"Let Me"	Earattack, Mark, Yoogeun	Earattack, Lish, Mark	Earattack, Lish	3:21
Total length:					45:22

== Charts ==
Weekly chart performance for Flight Log: Turbulence
Chart (2016)	Peak position
Belgian Albums (Ultratop Flanders)	178
French Albums (SNEP)	136
Japanese Albums (Oricon)	23
New Zealand Heatseeker Albums (RMNZ)	6
South Korean Albums (Gaon)	1
US Heatseekers Albums (Billboard)	7
US World Albums (Billboard)	1

Monthly chart performance for Flight Log: Turbulence
Chart (2016)	Peak position
South Korean Albums (Gaon)	2

Yearly chart performance for Flight Log: Turbulence
Chart (2016)	Peak position
South Korean Albums (Gaon)	10
