= 7 for 7 =

- Digital cover

EP by Got7
- Released: October 10, 2017
- Recorded: 2017
- Studios: JYP Studios (Seoul, South Korea)
- Length: 24:20
- Language: Korean
- Label: JYP Entertainment

Got7 chronology
Flight Log: Arrival (2017)	7 for 7 (2017)	Eyes on You (2018)

Singles from 7 for 7
- 1. "You Are" Released: October 10, 2017

7 for 7 is the seventh extended play by the South Korean boy band Got7. It was released on October 10, 2017, by JYP Entertainment.

The Taiwanese edition of 7 for 7, released on November 10, 2017, includes the Chinese version of "Face" as the eighth track. On December 7, the disc was re-released with a new graphic called "Present Edition".

== Background and composition ==
On September 20, 2017, JYP Entertainment announced Got7's new extended play 7 for 7, revealing the title and the release date with a short video showing seven triangular pendants brought together to form the heptagon of the group's logo. The title track was disclosed on September 26, followed by the songs preview on October 8. Got7 presented the album on October 6 at the Hall of Peace of Kyunghee University in Seoul, performing before 4,000 fans during a showcase broadcast simultaneously on V Live and presented by Soran's Go Young-bae; 7 for 7 was released the following day together with the music video of title track "You Are".

Leader JB explained that 7 for 7 emphasizes, starting from the title, the number 7 (recalling the name of the group), the number of members, the fact that it is Got7's seventh Korean extended play, and the seven months since the release of their previous album, Flight Log: Arrival. Breaking away from the Flight Log trilogy, which represented the intensity of youth, the new record explores the coexistence of darkness and anxiety in it, with instability as a central theme, and focuses on showing the unity of the group as one. The members wrote the lyrics of, and sometimes composed, each of the EP's 7 tracks, showing their own interpretation of anxiety.

"Moon U", whose sound recalls that of Bruno Mars, was co-written and co-composed by Youngjae under the pseudonym Ars, and sees BamBam writing part of the lyrics. The song compares the incomplete moon covered in the clouds of the evening to the face of a loved one, indicating that you are thinking of them. JB, under the pseudonym Defsoul, worked on the alternative R&B piece "Teenager", and the pop and tropical house song "You Are", which he wrote and composed while promoting JJ Project's album Verse 2 in August. "Teenager" is a mid-tempo song featuring trap and chiptune elements, and is about a pure love and a person who makes you feel younger. "You Are" was inspired by the skies of the Japanese film Your Name; the initial title was "Beautiful Sky", which was later changed at the suggestion of J.Y. Park taking into consideration the lyrics of the song, which express gratitude towards a loved one – be it a friend, a parent or a lover – for their support, comparing them to the sky that one looked at when they were exhausted and that gave the motivation to move on. The melody gives the sensation of awakening from sleep and gradually rising from a place that made you feel trapped. Among the songwriters and composers of the song there are also Mirror Boy, D.ham and Moon Hanmiru. The music video shows the members wandering the streets of Hong Kong only to find each other, evoking the record's theme of unity.

Jinyoung worked on the lyrics and music for "Firework", a song that was completed the previous April for JJ Project, but was then kept aside for Got7. The song gives comfort by comparing anxiety to a firework that sooner or later will explode and disappear. BamBam wrote and composed the jazz ballad "Remember You", which features piano melodies overlapped by the synthesizer, and talks about the anxiety of being in love. Yugyeom worked on "To Me", which expresses loneliness and fatigue; the album ends with the electropop ballad "Face", a melancholy song about missing someone, which sees Jackson, Mark and BamBam writing the rap, reflecting on their experience as foreign singers in Korea.

== Critical reception ==
Professional ratings
Review scores
Source	Rating
IZM	2.5/5 stars

The record received overall positive reviews. Commenting on the participation of the whole group in the writing and composition of the songs of 7 for 7, Newsis defined the album "a direct testimony of Got7's present and a clear preview of their future". In her review for The Korea Herald, Hong Dam-young made parallels with the sounds of JJ Project's EP Verse 2, which reflected on the past and raised questions about the uncertainty of the future, judging 7 for 7 "an introspective album that stirs listeners' emotions" and an extension of Verse 2. For Hong You-kyoung of Korea JoongAng Daily, "Got7 challenges the notion that autumn is a solemn season with an upbeat sound on their cheerful and refreshing album 7 for 7, featuring energetic songs and a fun-loving vibe."

IZM Kang Min-jung gave the record 2.5 stars out of 5, calling it a turning point for Got7, and appreciated, on the whole, the presence of the members in the music credits and that they were slowly finding their own style. She noticed how the masculinity emphasized by the group early in their career taking 2PM as an example had disappeared, adding instead a natural touch, and underlined the change in the sounds, which move away from "the stereotypes of dance music of male idol groups such as strong bass, trap rhythms, synthesizers and defined group choreographies", instead borrowing the colors of pop and presenting "sophisticated music". While appreciating the softness of "You Are", "Firework" and "Remember You", Kim pointed out that the lack of strength and a clear development were gaps to fill.

According to Billboard, "'You Are' veers away from the group's more recent performance and hip-hop-focused singles. Instead, it focuses on the uplifting, mellow tones of the group's vocalists and counters them with hard-hitting raps from Got7's rappers, crafting an evocative pop-EDM track", "sentimental in its soaring builds and sweeping melodies".

== Track listing ==
No.	Title	Lyrics	Music	Arrangement	Length
1.	"Moon U"	Ars (Youngjae); Joo Chan-yang; Maxx Song; BamBam	Ars (Youngjae); Joo Chan-yang; Command Freaks	Command Freaks	3:22
2.	"Teenager"	Defsoul (JB); FS	Defsoul (JB); FS; Royal Dive	Royal Dive	3:09
3.	"You Are"	Defsoul (JB); Mirror BOY; D.ham; Moon Hanmiru	Defsoul (JB); Mirror BOY; D.ham; Moon Hanmiru	Mirror Boy; D.ham; Moon Hanmiru	3:21
4.	"Firework"	Jinyoung; Distract	Jinyoung; Distract; Secret Weapon	Secret Weapon	3:40
5.	"Remember You"	Lee Ha-jin; BamBam	Images; BamBam	Images; Say	4:06
6.	"내게" (To Me)	Yugyeom	Yugyeom; Effn	Effn; Heth; Samuel Ku	3:18
7.	"Face"	Lee Woomin 'Collapsedone'; Mayu Wakisaka; Jackson Wang; Mark; BamBam	Lee Woomin 'Collapsedone'; Mayu Wakisaka	Lee Woo-min 'Collapsedone'	3:29
Total length:					24:23

== Charts ==
Weekly chart performance for 7 for 7
Chart (2017)	Peak position
Belgian Albums (Ultratop Flanders)	194
Chinese Albums (V Chart)	1
Japanese Albums (Oricon)	20
New Zealand Heatseeker Albums (RMNZ)	8
South Korean Albums (Gaon)	1
US World Albums (Billboard)	2

Monthly chart performance for 7 for 7
Chart (2017)	Peak position
South Korean Albums (Gaon)	3

Yearly chart performance for 7 for 7
Chart (2017)	Peak position
South Korean Albums (Gaon)	8

== Release history ==
Region	Date	Format	Label
South Korea	October 10, 2017	CD; Digital download	JYP Entertainment; Genie Music
Worldwide	October 10, 2017	Digital download	JYP Entertainment
