= Hard Carry =

Single by Got7

from the album Flight Log: Turbulence
- Language: Korean
- Released: September 27, 2016
- Length: 3:13
- Label: JYP
- Composers: Earattack; Lish; Yoogeun
- Lyricists: Earattack; Yoogeun

Got7 singles chronology
"Home Run" (2015)	"Hard Carry" (2016)	"Never Ever" (2017)

Music video
- "Hard Carry" on YouTube

"Hard Carry" is a song recorded by South Korean boy group Got7 for their second studio album Flight Log: Turbulence. It was released by JYP Entertainment on September 27, 2016.

== Background and release ==
On September 8, 2016, JYP Entertainment announced that Got7 was going to have a comeback their by early October. On September 27, 2016 both "Hard Carry" and their second studio album Flight Log: Turbulence were released.

== Composition ==
"Hard Carry" lyrics were written by Earattack and Yoogeun and composed by Earattack, Lish and Yoogeun. "Hard Carry" is an electronic song featuring "whirring synths, finger snaps, layered vocal samples and howls," which Billboard called a "sonic whirlwind."

The song is composed in the key C-sharp Major and has 100 beats per minute and a running time of 3 minutes and 13 seconds.

== Promotion ==
Got7 held their first comeback stage for "Hard Carry" on Mnet's M Countdown on September 29, 2016. They also performed on Music Bank on September 30, Show! Music Core on October 1 and SBS' Inkigayo on October 2.

== Accolades ==
Music program awards for "Hard Carry"
Program	Date	Ref.
M Countdown	October 6	
Inkigayo	October 9	
Music Bank	October 7	
The Show	October 18	

== Charts ==
=== Weekly charts ===
Weekly chart positions
Chart (2016)	Peak position
South Korea (Gaon)	3
US World Digital Songs (Billboard)	2

=== Monthly charts ===
Chart (September 2016)	Peak position
South Korea (Gaon)	41

== Sales ==
Country	Sales
South Korea (digital)	132,299

== Release history ==
Release history for "Hard Carry"
Region	Date	Format	Label
Various	September 27, 2016	Digital download	JYP
