= Flight Log: Arrival =

- Digital cover

EP by Got7
- Released: March 13, 2017
- Recorded: 2016–2017
- Genres: K-pop; hip hop; R&B; dance; trap
- Length: 27:01
- Label: JYP Entertainment
- Producers: J.Y. Park "The Asiansoul"; HeavyMental; Got7

Got7 chronology
Flight Log: Turbulence (2016)	Flight Log: Arrival (2017)	7 for 7 (2017)

Singles from Flight Log: Arrival
- 1. "Never Ever" Released: March 13, 2017

Flight Log: Arrival is the sixth extended play by the South Korean male group Got7. It was released on March 13, 2017, under JYP Entertainment.

== Background and composition ==
Flight Log: Arrival is the third and final installment in the Flight Log trilogy, representing the intensity of youth. It consists of eight tracks written and composed by the members, with the exception of the first track, "Never Ever", produced by J.Y. Park; JB and Youngjae are credited under the stage names Defsoul and Ars, respectively. The album sees the group leaning towards EDM and house.

"Never Ever" is a hip hop and future song that opens with synthesizer beats and whose theme is a love with a happy ending, while "Paradise" has a tropical sound. "Sign" was written by Youngjae, who built it with the members' voices in mind so that each could sing the most suitable part, and features a classic slow and minimal R&B arrangement. "Shopping Mall" compares the lover to a shopping mall, with references to discounts and air conditioning in the lyrics.

== Critical reception ==
Idology called the album a "safe landing" where the group seemed to have found their final destination after wandering far and wide, citing "Q" and "Out" as the best songs and stating that the latter seemed like an interesting preview of the next album. For NME, "Never Ever" has a disappointing chorus due to the weakening of the build up.

== Track listing ==
No.	Title	Lyrics	Music	Arrangement	Length
1.	"Never Ever"	J.Y. Park "The Asiansoul"; Earattack (HeavyMental); Zomay (HeavyMental); Yoogeun (HeavyMental)	J.Y. Park "The Asiansoul"; Earattack (HeavyMental); 5$ (HeavyMental); Zomay (HeavyMental); Yoogeun (HeavyMental)	Earattack (HeavyMental); 5$ (HeavyMental)	3:14
2.	"Shopping Mall"	Earattack (HeavyMental); Defsoul (JB); Jackson Wang; BamBam; Mark	Earattack (HeavyMental); 5$ (HeavyMental); Jackson Wang	Earattack (HeavyMental); 5$ (HeavyMental)	3:39
3.	"Paradise"	Jinyoung; Distract; BamBam	Jinyoung; Secret Weapon; Distract	Secret Weapon	3:31
4.	"Sign"	Chloe; Noday; Ars (Youngjae)	Noday; Chloe; Ars (Youngjae)	Noday; Chloe	3:24
5.	"Go Higher"	Earattack (HeavyMental); Defsoul (JB); Mark; BamBam; Jackson Wang	Earattack (HeavyMental); Defsoul (JB); 5$ (HeavyMental)	Earattack (HeavyMental); 5$ (HeavyMental)	3:37
6.	"Q"	Defsoul (JB); GDLO (MonoTree)	Defsoul (JB); GDLO (MonoTree)	GDLO (MonoTree)	3:20
7.	"양심없이" (Don't Care)	Yugyeom	Yugyeom; Mo'l	Mo'l; Heth	2:51
8.	"Out"	Jackson Wang; Boytoy; Wizil	Jackson Wang; Boytoy	Boytoy	3:18
Total length:					27:01

== Charts ==
Weekly chart performance for Flight Log: Arrival
Chart (2017)	Peak position
Australian Albums (ARIA)	92
Belgian Albums (Ultratop Flanders)	182
Japanese Albums (Oricon)	9
New Zealand Heatseekers Albums (RMNZ)	8
South Korean Albums (Gaon)	1
US Heatseekers Albums (Billboard)	3
US World Albums (Billboard)	1

Monthly chart performance for Flight Log: Arrival
Chart (2017)	Peak position
South Korean Albums (Gaon)	1

Yearly chart performance for Flight Log: Arrival
Chart (2017)	Peak position
South Korean Albums (Gaon)	10
