= Identify (album) =

- Digital cover

Studio album by Got7
- Released: November 18, 2014
- Recorded: JYP Studio, Seoul, 2014
- Genres: K-pop; Hip-hop; R&B
- Length: 37:04
- Labels: JYP; KT
- Producer: J.Y. Park "The Asiansoul"

Got7 chronology
Got Love (2014)	Identify (2014)	Just Right (2015)

Singles from Identify
- 1. "Stop Stop It" Released: November 17, 2014

Identify is the debut studio album by South Korean boy band Got7. It was released on November 18, 2014.

== Background and composition ==
Identify was produced by J.Y. Park to identify Got7's identity, concluding that it was a "familiar magnetism."

The album consists of eleven tracks, including the title tracks from Got7's two previous albums, namely "Girls Girls Girls" from Got It? and "A" from Got Love. The overall theme is love. The title track "Stop Stop It," which promoted the album, was written and composed by J.Y. Park: its genre is hip-hop and talks about a man who wants to confess his love but is unable to, thus singing his sadness. "Gimme," whose melodies and chord progression are reminiscent of the music from the Nineties, expresses the desire to forget a former lover and start a new love, while the R&B "Take My Hand" talks about a girl whose beauty makes someone want to hold her hand, and "Just Tonight" talks about the excitement of two lovers. "Moonlight" and "She's a Monster" are also R&B, with the latter recalling the sound of the 2000s and comparing the loved woman to a monster that controls the mind and body of her partner.

== Critical reception ==
Professional ratings
Review scores
Source	Rating
IZM	1/5 stars

Kim Yoon-ha of Idology called "Stop Stop It" the 2.0 version of "A", stating that it was influenced by American boy bands such as Hi-Five and NSYNC, and felt that the album, boldly abandoning the hip hop atmosphere of the debut and introducing retro interpretations in "Gimme" and "Turn Up the Volume", was enough to highlight Got7's individuality among the many idol groups. Her colleague Block observed that it fulfilled the goal of defining the group's identity, appreciating the use of synthesizer and vocoder to give "Stop Stop It" a new jack swing feel. He noted that vocals were lacking at times, but commented that the album conveyed a youthful image, giving a clumsy and fresh vibe compared to the masculinity overtly promoted by 2 pm. Despite the praise, he concluded that it was not a complete album and that each member had room for improvement.

On the other hand, MRJ of Idology deemed "Stop Stop It" unoriginal and with many unpleasant aspects, especially the excessive use of vocoder; similarly, Jo Sung-min observed that Identify was disappointing because it led to Got7 being labeled as 2 pm's younger siblings, adding that "even the individuality and charm of each member, gradually revealed on the previous album, has faded again, and the color of the entire group is the same." In his review, Kim Do-heon of IZM called "Stop Stop It" "incredibly easygoing, predictable, and lacking impact," commenting, however, that the intervention of other composers had limited J.Y. Park's influence to the title track, elevating the album to a typical, mediocre idol album, while remaining, on average, "truly embarrassing." He added that none of the songs stood out in the 2014 music market, and that, despite the album's title, there was no clear definition of Got7's identity due to "an ambiguous mix of songs". He attributed the album's negative aspects to the lack of promotion and J.Y. Park's insistence on producing subpar works.

== Track listing ==
No.	Title	Writer(s)	Composer(s)	Length
1.	"하지하지마" (Stop Stop It)	J.Y. Park "The Asiansoul"	J.Y. Park "The Asiansoul"	3:16
2.	"Gimme"	Joyul (Princess Disease)	Joyul (Princess Disease)	3:42
3.	"손이 가" (Take My Hand)	Park Kang-hyuk, Beom & Nang	Beom & Nang	3:12
4.	"너란 Girl" (Magnetic)	Hong Ji-sang	Hong Ji-sang	3:23
5.	"그냥 오늘 밤" (Just Tonight)	Ryan Im, Jackson	Greg Bonnick and Hayden Chapman aka LDN Noise and Myron Jordine	2:41
6.	"볼륨을 올려줘" (Turn Up the Volume)	Ryan Im	Paul Najjar, Daniel Kim, 110403	3:37
7.	"그대로 있어도 돼" (Stay)	Chloe	Erik Lidbom, Daniel Kim, 110403	3:14
8.	"달빛" (Moonlight)	Noday, Chloe	Noday, Chloe	3:53
9.	"She's A Monster"	Keonu Park, mr.cho	Keonu Park, mr.cho	3:32
10.	"Girls Girls Girls"	J.Y. Park "The Asiansoul"	J.Y. Park "The Asiansoul"	3:33
11.	"A"	J.Y. Park "The Asiansoul"	J.Y. Park "The Asiansoul", Noday	3:01
Total length:				37:04

== Charts ==
Weekly chart performance for Identify
Chart (2014)	Peak position
South Korean Albums (Gaon)	1
US World Albums (Billboard)	6

Monthly chart performance for Identify
Chart (2014)	Peak position
South Korean Albums (Gaon)	2

Yearly chart performance for Identify
Chart (2014)	Peak position
South Korean Albums (Gaon)	28
Chart (2015)	Peak position
South Korean Albums (Gaon)	97
