= Mad (Got7 EP) =

EP by Got7
- Released: September 29, 2015
- Recorded: 2015
- Studios: JYP, Seoul, South Korea
- Genre: K-pop
- Length: 20:05
- Labels: JYP Entertainment; KT Music
- Producer: J.Y. Park "The Asiansoul"

Got7 chronology
Just Right (2015)	Mad (2015)	Moriagatteyo (2016)

Singles from Mad
- 1. "If You Do" Released: September 29, 2015

Repackaged album cover
- Digital cover

Mad (stylized as MAD) is the fourth extended play by South Korean boy band Got7, released on September 29, 2015 by JYP Entertainment.

On November 23, 2015, it was reissued as a repackage album titled Mad Winter Edition.

== Composition ==
"If You Do" is composed by Black Eyed Pilseung and presents the image of a man who has become weak in the face of love, with angry lines such as "But every day I fall to my knees" (하지만 매일 난 무릎 꿇었어) and "You pushed me down off a cliff" (날 절벽으로 밀어 부쳤어), and a melancholy sound.

"Put'em Up" is written and composed by J.Y. Park and depicts a gorgeous woman as a criminal and the man in love with her as a policeman.

The reissue features three new songs at the beginning, and closes with the stage version of "If You Do". "Confession Song" is written and composed by J.Y. Park and is about a man who borrows the power of singing to declare his love. "Everyday" is composed by Got7's leader JB, while Junior wrote the lyrics for "To Star". The latter is a bittersweet ballad wishing the moments spent with the loved one would return.

== Critical reception ==
Mimyo of Idology felt that "If You Do" made good use of the sad yet powerful charm of JYP's songs. For Oyo, the sad and solemn concept of the song clashed with the image of cheerful Californian boys that Got7 had built up until that point through "Girls Girls Girls", "A", and "Just Right", to the point of being embarrassing. Jo Sung-min considered "If You Do" a misstep at a time when Got7 needed to secure a solid fandom and differentiate themselves from other groups, commenting, "The refreshing energy of 'A,' which perfectly captured Got7's unique strengths, has vanished, and 'If You Do,' which is the complete opposite, expresses something closer to pettiness than sadness. This album further reinforces the suspicion I had while listening to 'Stop Stop'—'Isn't this group a little version of 2PM?'" He also felt that the album's overall composition lacked catchy tracks.

In 2019, Billboard placed "If You Do" at number 95 on its list of the 100 Best K-Pop Songs of the 2010s, citing it as a cornerstone of the group's sound.

== Track listing ==
No.	Title	Writer(s)	Composer(s)	Length
1.	"If You Do (니가 하면)"	Sam Lewis	Rado of Black Eyed Pilseung	3:33
2.	"Put'em Up (손들어)"	J.Y. Park "The Asiansoul", Cho Wool of Princess Disease	J.Y. Park "The Asiansoul", Cho Wool of Princess Disease	3:08
3.	"Feelin' Good (느낌이 좋아)"	Chloe, Noday, Jackson, Mark	Chloe, Noday	3:35
4.	"Good"	E.One, Lee Mansung, Jackson, Mark	E.One	3:11
5.	"Eyes On (눈이가요)"	Ju Chanyang, Maxx Song	Command Freaks, Ju Chanyang	3:24
6.	"Tic Tic Tok"	Chloe, Noday, Jackson	Noday, Chloe	3:22
Total length:				20:08

=== Mad Winter Edition ===
No.	Title	Writer(s)	Composer(s)	Length
1.	"고백송" (Confession Song)	J.Y. Park "The Asiansoul"	J.Y. Park "The Asiansoul"	3:33
2.	"매일" (Everyday)	Defsoul (JB), Cho Wool of Princess Disease, BamBam	Defsoul (JB), Cho Wool of Princess Disease	3:11
3.	"이.별" (To Star)	Jinyoung	Andreas Stone Johansson, Matt Wong, Steven Lee	3:52
10.	"니가 하면 (If You Do)" (Stage Ver.)	Sam Lewis	Rado of Black Eyed Pilseung	3:33

== Charts ==
Weekly chart performance for Mad
Chart (2015)	Peak position	
Chart (2015)	Mad	Reissue
South Korean Albums (Gaon)	1	2
US World Albums (Billboard)	1	12

Monthly chart performance for Mad
Chart (2015)	Peak position	
Chart (2015)	Mad	Reissue
South Korean Albums (Gaon)	5	7

Yearly chart performance for Mad
Chart (2015)	Peak position	
Chart (2015)	Mad	Reissue
South Korean Albums (Gaon)	24	70
