= My Swagger =

- Cover.

Single by Got7
- A-side: "My Swagger"
- B-side: "Meet Me"
- Released: May 24, 2017
- Genre: J-pop
- Label: Epic Records Japan
- Composer: Akadu
- Lyricists: Yuji Shirai; Simon

Got7 singles chronology
"Hey Yah" (2016)	"My Swagger" (2017)

Music video
- "My Swagger" on YouTube

"My Swagger" is a Japanese single by South Korean boy group Got7, released on May 24, 2017. It was number-one on the Billboard Japan Hot 100 and reached the third place on the Oricon Weekly Singles Chart. It has sold 61 305 copies in the first week according to Billboard Japan, and 35 277 copies in May 2017 according to Oricon.

It was released in three physical versions: version A, a CD+DVD version with a music video and an off-shot video; version B, another CD+DVD version with the music video and "Meet Me" recording behind-the-scenes; and version C, a CD only version.

== Track listing ==
No.	Title	Lyrics	Music	Length
1.	"My Swagger"	Yuji Shirai; Simon	Akadu	3:07
2.	"Meet Me"	Defsoul; Mirror Boy; D.Ham; Moon Hanmiru; Komu	Defsoul; Mirror Boy	3:39
3.	"My Swagger" ((Inst.)		Akadu	3:05
4.	"Meet Me" ((Inst.)		Defsoul; Mirror Boy	3:39

== Charts ==
=== Weekly charts ===
Chart (2017)	Peak position
Japan (Billboard Japan Japan Hot 100)	1
Japan (Billboard Japan Top Singles Sales)	1
Japan (Oricon Singles Chart)	3

=== Monthly charts ===
Chart (May 2017)	Peak position
Japan (Oricon Singles Chart)	10
