= Just Right (EP) =

- Digital cover

EP by Got7
- Released: July 13, 2015
- Recorded: 2015
- Studios: JYP Studio, Seoul, South Korea
- Genre: K-pop
- Length: 21:01
- Labels: JYP Entertainment, KT Music
- Producer: J.Y. Park "The Asiansoul"

Got7 chronology
Identify (2014)	Just Right (2015)	Mad (2015)

Singles from Just Right
- 1. "Just Right" Released: July 13, 2015

Just Right is the third extended play by South Korean boy band Got7. It was released on July 13, 2015.

== Background and composition ==
The release of the album was announced on June 29, 2015, while the tracklist was revealed on July 8.

"Just Right" was composed and produced by The Jackie Boyz, consisting of siblings Carlos and Steven Battey, with lyrics by J.Y. Park, and combines pop melodies with the energetic rhythms of southern hip hop. The song is sung from the perspective of a boyfriend encouraging his girlfriend about her physical appearance, reassuring her that she is perfect just the way she is. The extended play, which was released on July 13 at midnight along with the music video for "Just Right," features JB writing the rap for "Mine" under the pseudonym Defsoul, and Jackson and Mark writing the one for "Back to Me." "Before the Full Moon Rises" is about a lover who doesn't want to separate from his partner, even if the day has come to an end.

== Critical reception ==
Critics from South Korean webzine Idology had mixed opinions about the record. Kim Yoon-ah stated that the laid-back groove of "Just Right" represented Got7's unique color, which they had maintained since their debut, but was unconvinced by the songs as they seemed to fail to keep up with the members' growth, pointing to "Back to Me" as the only balanced one. Oyo felt that the energy was wasted as the album alternates between hip hop and R&B tracks, showing a lot of everything but without a clear direction in mind, while Yoo Je-sang called it an easy-to-listen-to album which had successfully adapted the 1990s sound to the contemporary era. Block found the songs interesting and fun.

== Track listing ==
No.	Title	Writer(s)	Composer(s)	Length
1.	"딱 좋아" (Just Right)	J.Y. Park "The Asiansoul"	Carlos Battey, Steven Battey, Gavin Jones, Charles "Chizzy" Stephens III, Timothy "C Minor" Zimnoch, Jay Dmuchowski	3:43
2.	"보름달이 뜨기 전에" (Before the Full Moon Rises)	Cho Gae-hyuk (Mr. Cho), Daniel Keonu Park	Cho Gae-hyuk (Mr. Cho), Daniel Keonu Park	3:34
3.	"온몸이 반응해" (My Reaction)	Joul of Princess Disease	Joul of Princess Disease	3:41
4.	"Nice"	Ro Tai-lyoong (Noday), Tommy Park	Tommy Park	3:05
5.	"Mine"	Jung Joo-hee, JB (rap parts)	Joe J. Lee (Kairos), Bob Horn, Jarah Gibson, Jarkko Ehnqvist	3:51
6.	"Back to Me"	Yoon Jong-sung, Jang Jung-seok (Sum People), Jackson Wang (rap parts), Mark Tuan (rap parts)	Yoon Jong-sung, Jang Jung-seok (Sum People)	3:10
Total length:				21:01

== Charts ==
Weekly chart performance for Just Right
Chart (2015)	Peak position
South Korean Albums (Gaon)	3

Monthly chart performance for Just Right
Chart (2015)	Peak position
South Korean Albums (Gaon)	7

Yearly chart performance for Just Right
Chart (2015)	Peak position
South Korean Albums (Gaon)	25
