= Present: You =

- Digital cover

Studio album by Got7
- Released: September 17, 2018
- Recorded: 2018
- Length: 53:53
- Language: Korean
- Labels: JYP; IRIVER
- Producers: J.Y. Park "The Asiansoul"; Got7

Got7 chronology
Eyes on You (2018)	Present: You (2018)	Spinning Top (2019)

Singles from Present: You
- 1. "Lullaby" Released: September 17, 2018

Repackaged edition cover
- Digital cover

Present: You (stylized as Present: YOU) is the third Korean studio album by the South Korean boy band Got7. It was released on September 17, 2018, under the label of JYP Entertainment. It features the single "Lullaby" in four different languages (Korean, English, Chinese and Spanish) as well as solo tracks co-produced by each member.

The album was certified platinum by Gaon Chart on November 8, 2018, after selling over 250,000 copies.

On December 3, 2018, it was reissued as a repackage album titled Present: You & Me Edition.

== Background and release ==
Present: You was first announced on August 24, 2018, at the end of an epilogue film during Got7's Eyes On You World Tour. It was later confirmed that they would release their third studio album on September 17. According to JYP, "the new album carries a meaning that the best present of the life of Got7 is you, the fans."

On August 29, two group teaser images were unveiled, followed by the track list on August 30 and unit teasers from August 31 to September 2.

On November 16, JYP Entertainment announced the release of a repackaged album set for December 3. The re-release features new title track "Miracle" and 11 other new tracks, as well as songs from the original release.

== Composition ==
Tamar Herman of Billboard described "Lullaby" as follows: "A funky house and synth-pop hybrid, the track bounces around between groovy verses before exploding with its bass-heavy chorus, creating a modern-day 'Lullaby' as the group's vocalists let loose with soaring belts, especially Youngjae, Jinyoung and JB."

She also described "Miracle" as "a gentle, piano-based pop ballad built for the season, a smooth carol featuring Christmastime bells and sweet strings over which the members sing and rap, showing off their harmonizing."

Jeff Benjamin of Billboard defined "Lullaby", "Enough" and "I Am Me" as "some of the septet's most ambitious and complex tracks to date."

== Music videos ==
Music videos of Jackson, BamBam, Youngjae, Jinyoung, Yugyeom, JB and Mark's solo songs were released on a daily basis at 6PM (KST) from September 7 to September 13, 2018. The teaser video of "Lullaby" was released a few hours before Mark's music video.

The music video of "Lullaby" was released on September 17, gaining 10 million views in 24 hours. New videos were released for every five million views gained on the "Lullaby" video, until the 50 million view point. These videos included solo music video switches and various versions of the "Lullaby" dance practice.

== Promotions ==
On September 16, all seven members were guests on SBS's Running Man show, their first appearance on the show since September 2016. They also held a "Countdown Live" show on Naver's V Live broadcasting site where they talked about their new tracks. On September 17, Got7 held a press conference before the album release. The same day, a comeback show hosted by Mnet was broadcast. Got7 is the third boy band to have their own show, after BTS and Wanna One. During the recording on September 12, they performed their new title track "Lullaby" as well as old tracks. On September 19, the group appeared as guests on JTBC's Idol Room to promote the album, making their debut on the show. On September 28, they appeared for the first time on KBS2's You Hee-yeol's Sketchbook.

Got7 held their comeback stage on Mnet's M Countdown on September 20 and promoted "Lullaby" and "I Am Me" on several music programs in South Korea, including Music Bank, Show! Music Core and Inkigayo.

== Track listing ==
No.	Title	Lyrics	Music	Arrangements	Length
1.	"Lullaby"	Jinli	Glory Face, Jake K, Jinli	Glory Face, Jake K	3:37
2.	"Enough"	Defsoul (JB), Mirror BOY, D.ham, Munhan Mirror	Defsoul (JB), Mirror BOY, D.ham, Munhan Mirror	Mirror BOY, D.ham, Munhan Mirror	3:19
3.	"지켜줄게" (Save You)	Defsoul (JB), Mirror BOY, D.ham, Munhan Mirror	Defsoul (JB), Mirror BOY, D.ham, Munhan Mirror	Mirror BOY, D.ham, Munhan Mirror	3:25
4.	"No One Else"	Yugyeom, EFFN, Room102	Yugyeom, EFFN, Room102	EFFN, Room102	3:22
5.	"I Am Me"	Jinyoung, Distract	Distract, Jinyoung, Ludwig Lindell	Ludwig Lindell	3:31
6.	"Sunrise" (solo by JB)	Defsoul (JB), JOMALXNE	Defsoul (JB), ROSEINPEACE, JOMALXNE	ROSEINPEACE	3:31
7.	"OMW" (solo by Mark featuring Jackson)	Jackson Wang, Mark, Wizil, BOYTOY	Jackson Wang, Mark, BOYTOY	Jackson Wang, BOYTOY	3:08
8.	"Made It" (solo by Jackson)	Jackson Wang	Jackson Wang, BOYTOY	Jackson Wang, BOYTOY	2:36
9.	"My Youth" (solo by Jinyoung)	Jinyoung, Distract	Distract, Jinyoung, Tobias Karlsson, Sangmi Kim	Tobias Karlsson, Sangmi Kim	3:32
10.	"혼자 (Nobody Knows)" (solo by Youngjae)	Ars (Youngjae), Pollen	Ars (Youngjae), Pollen, LAVIN	LAVIN	3:06
11.	"Party" (solo by BamBam)	BamBam	FRANTS, BamBam	FRANTS	3:04
12.	"Fine" (solo by Yugyeom)	Yugyeom	EFFN, Yugyeom	EFFN	3:03
13.	"Lullaby" (English version)	Sophia Pae	Glory Face, Jake K, Jinli	Glory Face, Jake K	3:37
14.	"Lullaby" (Chinese version)	Zou Shunli	Glory Face, Jake K, Jinli	Glory Face, Jake K	3:37
15.	"Lullaby" (Spanish version)	Alejandro González	Glory Face, Jake K, Jinli	Glory Face, Jake K	3:37
16.	"Lullaby" (instrumental)		Glory Face, Jake K, Jinli	Glory Face, Jake K	3:37
Total length:					53:42

=== Present: You & Me Edition ===
New songs are featured on CD 1; CD 2 is the same as Present: You.

CD 1
No.	Title	Lyrics	Music	Arrangements	Length
1.	"Miracle"	Kyum Lyk (153/Joombas), J.Y. Park "The Asiansoul"	Moon Kim (153/Joombas), Kyum Lyk (153/Joombas)	Kyum Lyk (153/Joombas)	4:10
2.	"Take Me to You"	Lee Joo-hyung (MonoTree), Inner Child (MonoTree), J.Y. Park "The Asiansoul"	Lee Joo-hyung (MonoTree), Yoon Jong-sung (MonoTree), Inner Child (MonoTree), Mayu Wakisaka	Yoon Jong-sung (MonoTree)	3:14
3.	"안 보여" (Come On)	Defsoul (JB), iHwak	Defsoul (JB), iHwak, Royal Dive	Royal Dive	3:14
4.	"1:31AM (잘 지내야해)" (JB, Youngjae)	Defsoul (JB), Ars (Youngjae)	Defsoul (JB), Ars (Youngjae), 220, minGtion	minGtion	3:51
5.	"Higher" (Jinyoung, Mark)	Jinyoung, Mark	Jinyoung, Distract, Secret Weapon	Secret Weapon	2:36
6.	"I Love It" (Jackson, BamBam, Yugyeom)	Jackson Wang, Gen Neo	Jackson Wang, Gen Neo	Gen Neo	1:11
7.	"WOLO" (Jackson, BamBam, Yugyeom)	Jackson Wang, BamBam, Yugyeom	Jackson Wang, Gen Neo	Jackson Wang, Gen Neo	3:04
8.	"King" (Jinyoung, BamBam)	Jinyoung, BamBam	Jinyoung, BamBam, FRANTS	FRANTS	3:03
9.	"Think About It" (JB, Mark, Youngjae)	Defsoul (JB), Mark, Ars (Youngjae)	Defsoul (JB), Ars (Youngjae), Mark, Mirror BOY (220VOLT), Lee Sang-chul	Mirror BOY (220VOLT), Lee Sang-chul	3:08
10.	"이젠 (From Now)" (solo by Yugyeom)	Yugyeom	Yugyeom, effn	Yugyeom	3:19
11.	"Hunger" (solo by Jackson)	Jackson Wang	Jackson Wang, BOYTOY	Jackson Wang, BOYTOY	1:33
12.	"Phoenix" (Jackson, Yugyeom)	Jackson Wang, Yugyeom	Jackson Wang, Yugyeom, BOYTOY	Jackson Wang, BOYTOY	2:55
Total length:					35:18

== Charts ==
=== Weekly charts ===
Chart (2018)	Peak position	
Chart (2018)	You	You & Me
Belgian Albums (Ultratop Flanders)	175	—
French Download Albums (SNEP)	56	—
Japanese Albums (Oricon Albums Chart)	12	—
South Korean Albums (Gaon)	1	1
UK Download Albums (OCC)	97	—
US Heatseekers Albums (Billboard)	7	—
US Independent Albums (Billboard)	28	—
US World Albums (Billboard)	3	—

=== Year-end charts ===
Chart (2018)	Position	
Chart (2018)	You	You & Me
South Korean Albums (Gaon)	14	27

=== Singles ===
"Lullaby"

Chart	Peak position
Japan Hot 100 (Billboard Japan)	94
South Korea (Gaon)	19
South Korea (Kpop Hot 100)	1
US World Digital Song Sales (Billboard)	2

== Awards ==
=== Music programs ===
Song	Program	Date	Ref.
"Lullaby"	The Show (SBS M)	September 25, 2018	
"Lullaby"	Show Champion (MBC M)	September 26, 2018	
"Lullaby"	Show Champion (MBC M)	October 3, 2018	
"Lullaby"	M Countdown (Mnet)	September 27, 2018	
"Lullaby"	M Countdown (Mnet)	October 4, 2018	
"Lullaby"	Music Bank (KBS)	September 28, 2018	
"Lullaby"	Music Bank (KBS)	October 5, 2018	
"Lullaby"	Show! Music Core (MBC)	September 29, 2018	
"Lullaby"	Inkigayo (SBS)	September 30, 2018	
"Miracle"	Music Bank (KBS)	December 14, 2018	

== Release history ==
Edition	Country	Date	Format	Label	Ref.
Present: You	South Korea	September 17, 2018	CD; digital download; streaming	JYP Entertainment; IRIVER	
Present: You	Various	September 17, 2018	Digital download; streaming	JYP Entertainment; IRIVER	
Present: You & Me Edition	South Korea	December 3, 2018	CD; digital download; streaming	JYP Entertainment; IRIVER	
Present: You & Me Edition	Various	December 3, 2018	Digital download; streaming	JYP Entertainment; IRIVER	

== See also ==
- List of K-pop songs on the Billboard charts
- List of K-pop albums on the Billboard charts
- List of Gaon Album Chart number ones of 2018
