= Flight Log: Departure =

- Digital cover

EP by Got7
- Released: March 21, 2016
- Recorded: JYP Studio, Seoul, 2016
- Genres: K-pop; hip hop; R&B; dance; trap
- Length: 26:20
- Labels: JYP; KT Music
- Producer: J.Y. Park "The Asiansoul"

Got7 chronology
Moriagatteyo (2016)	Flight Log: Departure (2016)	Flight Log: Turbulence (2016)

Singles from Flight Log: Departure
- 1. "Fly" Released: March 21, 2016; 2. "Home Run" Released: April 12, 2016

Flight Log: Departure is the fifth extended play by South Korean boy band Got7. It was released on March 21, 2016 by JYP Entertainment.

== Background and composition ==
Flight Log: Departure was announced on February 26, 2016 along with the group's Fly Tour. Released on March 21, the album was promoted by the song "Fly," expressing "the freedom of youth in their twenties" and other themes such as love and friendship at that age.

Of the eight tracks, Got7 members contributed lyrics and composition for six. The album opens with "Fly," composed by Earattack and The Kick Sound, which speaks of a pure and discreet love, combining funk and hip hop over a trap base. The chorus, characterized by falsetto, mixes synths and electronic music.

The following tracks are "Can't," with lyrics written by Mark and Jinyoung, with the latter also credited for the music, and "See The Light," whose lyrics were written by Mark and Yugyeom, who collaborated with Frants on the composition. BamBam and Yugyeom also wrote the rap lyrics. The fifth track, "Rewind," was written and composed by Youngjae under the stage name Ars, and is his first song featured on a group's album since debut. JB, under the stage name Defsoul, wrote the lyrics and music for "Fish," "Something Good," and "Home Run." In the latter, romantic feelings are described in baseball terms. "Beggin On My Knees" is an up-tempo song reminiscent of 2010s pop with fast drum beats and electronic guitar riffs, while the tempo changes from high to medium.

== Critical reception ==
Reviewers at Korean webzine Idology had mixed opinions on the album. Kim Yoon-ah described it as an album that "feels like a weight has been lifted from their shoulders, freely moving through Got7's signature laid-back beats and moods" and praised the members' participation in the songwriting, believing that they stood out "within the flawlessly polished 'Got7 sound'" made of hip-hop, urban dance, and pop. Others felt that the group managed to find a clear distinction from 2PM, but that the beats of the first four tracks were very similar to each other, only to proceed with an unnatural change.

== Track listing ==
No.	Title	Lyrics	Music	Arrangements	Length
1.	"Fly"	Earattack, The Kick Sound	Earattack, The Kick Sound	earattack, OhBros, 5$	3:11
2.	"못하겠어" (Can't)	Jinyoung, Mark	Secret Weapon, Jinyoung, Distract	Secret Weapon	3:16
3.	"빛이나" (See The Light)	Yugyeom, Mark, Frants, BamBam	Yugyeom, Mark, Frants	Frants	3:24
4.	"Fish"	Daniel Kim, Defsoul (JB), Park Jiyeon, Dr. B	Daniel Kim, Defsoul (JB), Park Jiyeon	Daniel Kim	3:13
5.	"Rewind"	Ars (Youngjae), Ju Chanyang	Ars (Youngjae), Ju Chanyang, Command Freaks	Command Freaks	3:12
6.	"Beggin On My Knees"	Young K	Hyuk Shin, 2xxx!, Jusén, GG Riggs, Matt Heath, DK	Hyuk Shin, 2xxx!, Jusén	3:04
7.	"Something Good"	Defsoul (JB), Bambam	Andrew Choi, 220, Defsoul (JB), Mingsician	220, Mingsician	3:46
8.	"Home Run"	Daniel Kim, Defsoul (JB), Park Jiyeon	Daniel Kim, Defsoul (JB), Park Jiyeon	Daniel Kim	3:08
Total length:					26:20

== Charts ==
Weekly chart performance for Flight Log: Departure
Chart (2016)	Peak position
South Korean Albums (Gaon)	1
US Heatseekers Albums (Billboard)	2
US World Albums (Billboard)	2

Monthly chart performance for Flight Log: Departure
Chart (2016)	Peak position
South Korean Albums (Gaon)	1

Yearly chart performance for Flight Log: Departure
Chart (2016)	Peak position
South Korean Albums (Gaon)	15
US World Albums (Billboard)	15
