= Got Love (EP) =

- Digital cover

EP by Got7
- Released: June 23, 2014
- Recorded: JYP Studio, Seoul, South Korea; 2014
- Genres: K-pop; Contemporary R&B; Soul
- Length: 27:51
- Labels: JYP Entertainment, KT Music
- Producer: J.Y. Park "The Asiansoul"

Got7 chronology
Got It? (2014)	Got Love (2014)	Identify (2014)

Singles from Got Love
- 1. "A" Released: June 23, 2014

Got Love (stylized as GOT♡) is the second extended play by South Korean boy band Got7. It was released on June 23, 2014 by JYP Entertainment.

== Composition ==
The album consists of eight tracks: "U Got Me" is a hip hop song with drums as the main instrument, while "A" is an up-tempo R&B song with hip hop beats composed by J.Y. Park. The title is a combination of the English letter "a" and the homophonous Korean exclamation used to tease someone who tries in vain to hide their feelings. The song talks about the joy of a relationship change, and the excitement and feelings at the beginning of a love story.

"Bad Behaviour" is urban R&B, and the lyrics, written by JB, prompt to confess your feelings, while "Good Tonight" combines ethnic percussion and a brass arrangement with an urban beat: it talks about a couple in a secret relationship who is urged not to care about other people's opinions, but to love each other. "Forever Young" is an R&B and hip hop song, with acoustic guitar accents.

The rap for "U Got Me" was written by Jackson, although he is not credited.

== Critical reception ==
According to Yoo Je-sang of Idology, "From the melodies to the sound, this album was crafted meticulously," while Jo Sung-min of the same webzine found that, except for "A," the other songs were repetitive.

== Track listing ==
No.	Title	Writer(s)	Producer(s)	Length
1.	"U Got Me"	Noday; Chloe	Noday; Chloe	3:46
2.	"A"	J.Y. Park "The Asiansoul"	J.Y. Park "The Asiansoul"; Noday	3:01
3.	"Bad Behaviour" (나쁜 짓)	JB	Alex G; Erika Nuri; Andy Love	3:09
4.	"Good Tonight"	Lee Woomin "collapsedone"; Crizzy & Guy; Shin Eun Seung	Lee Woomin "collapsedone"; Fredrik "Fredro" Ödesjö; Crizzy & Guy	3:24
5.	"Forever Young"	Noday; Chloe	Noday; Chloe; Philip	3:43
6.	"A" (collapsedone Remix)	J.Y. Park "The Asiansoul"	Lee Woomin "collapsedone"	2:59
7.	"A" (TOYO Remix)	J.Y. Park "The Asiansoul"	Toyo Lee of Like Likes	3:10
8.	"A" (FRANTS Remix)	J.Y. Park "The Asiansoul"	Frants	4:39
Total length:				27:51

== Charts ==
Weekly chart performance for Got Love
Chart (2014)	Peak position
South Korean Albums (Gaon)	1
US World Albums (Billboard)	6

Monthly chart performance for Got Love
Chart (2014)	Peak position
South Korean Albums (Gaon)	3

Yearly chart performance for Got Love
Chart (2014)	Peak position
South Korean Albums (Gaon)	37
