= Got7 =

South Korean boy band

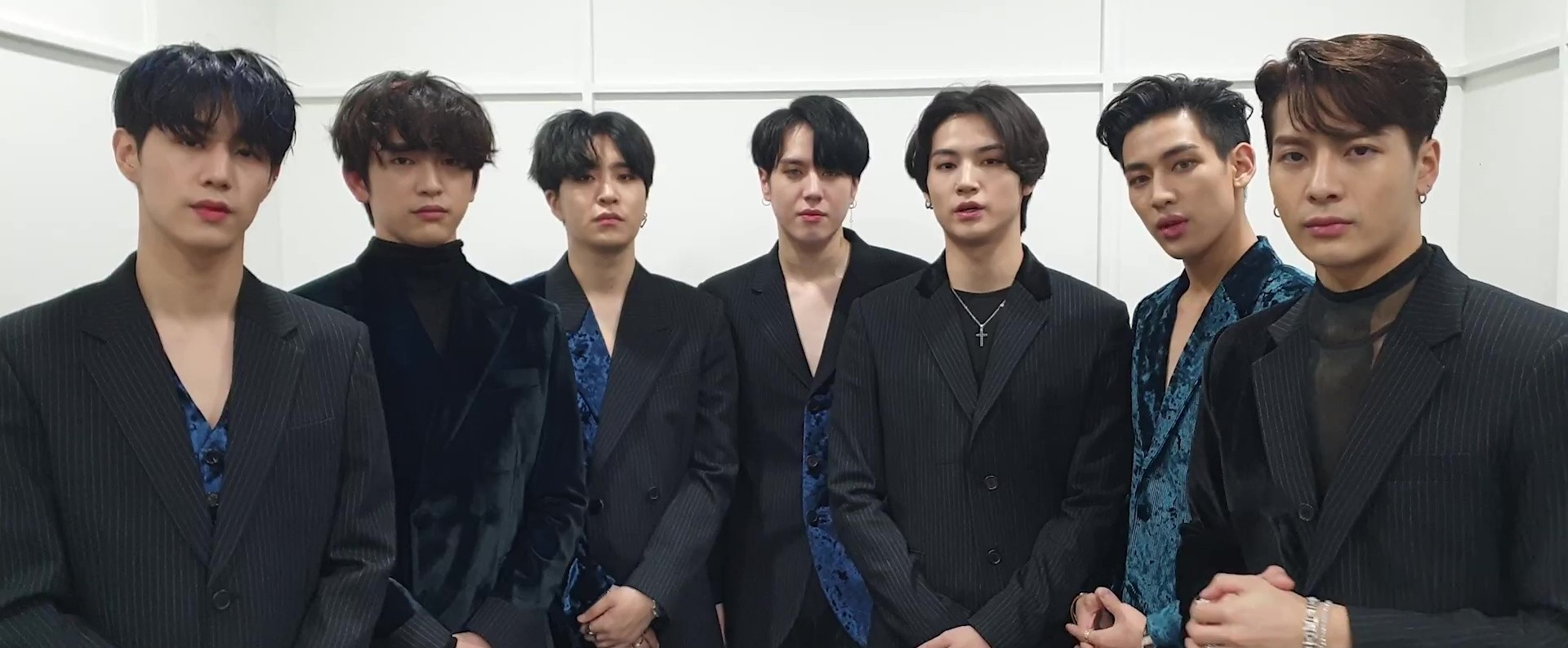
- Got7 in 2019. From left: Mark, Jinyoung, Youngjae, Yugyeom, Jay B, BamBam, and Jackson.

Background information
- Origin: Seoul, South Korea
- Genres: K-pop; hip-hop; trap; R&B
- Years active: 2014–present
- Labels: JYP; Sony Japan; Warner Music Korea; Kakao
- Members: Mark; Jay B; Jackson; Jinyoung; Youngjae; BamBam; Yugyeom
- Website: Official website

Got7 (Korean: 갓세븐; RR: Gatsebeun; stylized in all caps) is a South Korean boy band formed by JYP Entertainment. The group is composed of seven members: Mark, Jay B, Jackson, Jinyoung, Youngjae, BamBam, and Yugyeom. Got7 debuted in January 2014 with the release of their first EP Got It?, which peaked at number two on the Gaon Album Chart and number one on Billboard's World Albums Chart. The group gained attention also for their live performances, which often include elements of martial arts tricking and street dancing.

In late 2014, Got7 signed with Sony Music Entertainment Japan and ventured into the Japanese market to release their debut Japanese-language single "Around the World." They returned to South Korea a month later to release their first full-length studio album Identify, which topped the nation's charts. In 2015, Got7 released the EPs Just Right and Mad, which yielded their most commercially successful single, "Just Right." In 2016, they moved into the Japanese market with a full-length Japanese studio album, Moriagatteyo, which entered the Oricon Albums Chart at number three.

Their fifth Korean EP Flight Log: Departure and their second full-length studio album Flight Log: Turbulence were both chart-toppers, and the 2017 EP Flight Log: Arrival, the third and final part of the group's Flight Log series, was their first album to sell more than 300,000 copies.

The group departed from JYP Entertainment in January 2021, following the expiration of their contract with the agency.

As of November 2021, Got7 has sold 4.1 million copies according to the South Korean Circle Chart.

== History ==
=== 2009–2013: JJ Project and formation ===
After 2PM's debut in 2008, JYP Entertainment began working on the creation of a new, international boy group. In 2009, b-boy Lim Jae-beom and dancer Park Jin-young ranked first place in the open auditions and began their idol training; in 2012, they were removed from the new group project and debuted first as actors in the television drama Dream High 2, then as singers in the duo JJ Project, for which they adopted the stage names JB and Junior, respectively. Over the years, they changed their stage names to Jay B and Jinyoung. The following year, while JJ Project was preparing for their second album, they were reinstated as trainees in the group project.

In the three years of the project, the potential candidates for debut reached 30 people and the new boy band formation underwent continuous changes. In 2013, JYPE recruited Choi Young-jae at the closed auditions of a singing academy in Mokpo and included him in the group's project as a singer after a month of dance training. At the time, the debut line-up consisted of five people: in addition to Youngjae, Jay B and Jinyoung, there were American-Taiwanese Mark Tuan, who had arrived in South Korea from Los Angeles in August 2010, and the former Hong Kong fencer Jackson Wang, who had passed the international auditions in Kowloon in December 2010 and had moved to Seoul in the summer of 2011.

On September 6, 2013, Mark and Jackson appeared on the fourth episode of Mnet's reality-survival program Who is Next: WIN with two other trainees: BamBam, who had passed the auditions in Thailand in March 2010, and Yugyeom. On the same month, the final line-up was decided: having impressed Yang Hyun-suk on WIN, BamBam's debut was brought forward, and the boy joined Yugyeom in the pre-existing quintet when the debut song had already been decided, bringing the members to seven.

The debut of the group, temporarily called "Post 2PM", was announced in October for the following January. A tentative name of the group was "Get7" (Korean: 겟세븐), but in December 2013 the agency finally opted for Got7 because it didn't sound good. According to J.Y. Park, "Got7" originated from best-selling first-generation group g.o.d, as Park was supposed to debut with them as a six-member mix-gender group and used the working name "Got6." The final name includes the lucky number seven, meaning "seven lucky people who found each other and will go on together forever."

=== 2014: Debut with Got It?, first album and Japanese debut ===
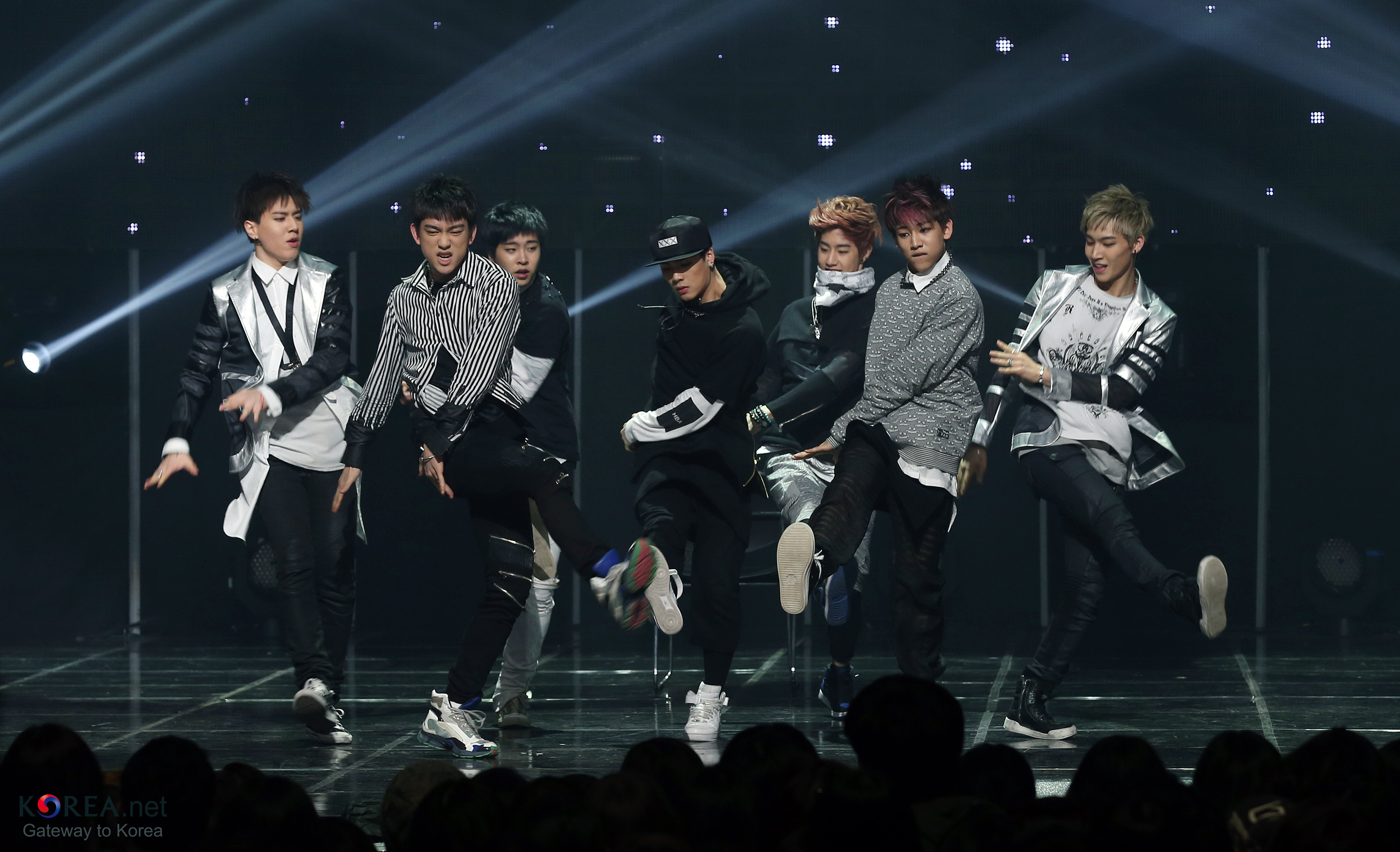
Got7 perform at M! Countdown in March 2014.

JYP Entertainment announced Got7 on January 1, 2014, debuting their first boy group since 2PM in 2008. It was described as a hip-hop group that incorporates martial arts tricking and b-boying styles in their performances. This style drew comparisons to their senior group, 2PM, who are well known for their acrobatic dance styles.

On January 15, the group held the Garage Showcase, which aired live through Daum Music, and debuted on January 16 on Mnet's M Countdown, performing their debut single "Girls Girls Girls". The music video was released at the same time and exceeded one million views on YouTube after two days, an unusual result for a new group, generating expectations for their subsequent activities. Got7 released their first EP, Got It?, on January 20, 2014: the album shot to No. 1 on Billboard's World Albums Chart and was No. 2 on the Gaon Album Chart. Shortly after their debut, the group signed a contract with Japan's Sony Music Entertainment and held the Got7 Showcase 1st Impact in Japan on April 4 at Ryōgoku Kokugikan in Tokyo and on April 17 at Zepp Namba in Osaka. In the meantime, they became brand ambassadors of sportswear brand Black Yak and ice cream brand Natuur Pop.

On June 18, Got7 presented their second EP, Got Love, and its title track "A" with a showcase at Ax Hall in Seoul, performing in front of 1,000 fans. The album was released on June 23. For their new EP, the group opted to show a brighter and more colorful image than their martial arts and b-boy style choreography emphasized at debut.

On September 25, Got It? and Got Love were released in Thailand as a special two-disc edition titled Got7 Thailand Special Set. In October, Got7 held their first Japan Tour, and made their Japanese debut on October 22 with their single Around the World. This included the hip-hop track "So Lucky," composed and written by 2PM's Jun. K. The single ranked No. 3 on the Oricon Weekly Chart and became the best-selling debut single by a K-pop artist in Japan between 2013 and 2014.

In November 2014, the group released their first full-length album, Identify, as well as the music video for its title track, "Stop Stop It". Identify topped Gaon's Weekly Album Chart in its first week and "Stop Stop It" peaked at number four on Billboard's World Digital Songs chart.

=== 2015: New music in South Korea and Japan ===
In January, Got7 were awarded the "New Artist Award" at the 29th Golden Disc Awards and at the 24th Seoul Music Awards. In the same month, Got7 starred in their own web drama Dream Knight, co-produced by Youku Tudou and JYP Pictures, and featuring actress Song Ha-yoon as the female lead role. The drama tells the story of a girl who shares dreams, love and friendship with a group of mysterious boys with magic powers and gathered close to 13 million hits in total. The show received the "Best Drama Award", "Best Director Award" and "Rising Star Award" at the K-Web Fest in July.

On June 10, 2015, the group released their second Japanese single "Love Train," which debuted at No. 4 on the Oricon Singles Chart. The single contains "Love Train," the original Japanese song O.M.G. and the two tracks' instrumental renditions. The group released their third EP, Just Right, on July 13, 2015. The title track, "Just Right", peaked at No. 3 on Billboard's World Digital Songs chart, remaining in the top three for two consecutive weeks.

Got7 released their third Japanese single "Laugh Laugh Laugh" with its B-side "Be My Girl" on September 23. It sold over 35,000 album copies in the first week of its release and made its debut at No. 1 on the Oricon's singles chart.

The group released their fourth EP, Mad, and the music video for its title track, "If You Do", on September 29. They followed up this release with their first repackaged album, Mad: Winter Edition, on November 23, with the three additional tracks, "Confession Song", "Everyday," and "To. Star."

=== 2016: Start of the Flight Log trilogy and first world tour ===
On February 3, 2016, Got7 released their first full-length Japanese studio album titled Moriagatteyo, which charted at No. 2 on the Oricon Album Chart. The 12 tracks featured in the album include songs from their first three Japanese singles, and the Japanese versions of "Girls Girls Girls," "A," "Stop Stop It," and "Just Right."

On February 15, 2016, Got7 were confirmed as new clothing ambassadors for NBA Style Korea with labelmate Twice, while, starting from April, they participated in a Japanese educational TV program realized by NHK Educational TV on the Korean language. They were featured in the textbooks and appeared regularly for two years until March 2018.

On March 21, 2016, Got7's fifth EP, Flight Log: Departure, and its title track, "Fly", were released. With this album, Got7 became the first Korean act to chart on Billboard's Artist 100 since Psy (peaking at No. 88), entering the chart at No. 45. Flight Log: Departure debuted at No. 2 on the Billboard Heatseekers Album Chart and on the Billboard World Albums Chart. On April 12, Got7 digitally released "Home Run," the second title track from Flight Log: Departure, which was co-written and co-composed by Jay B.

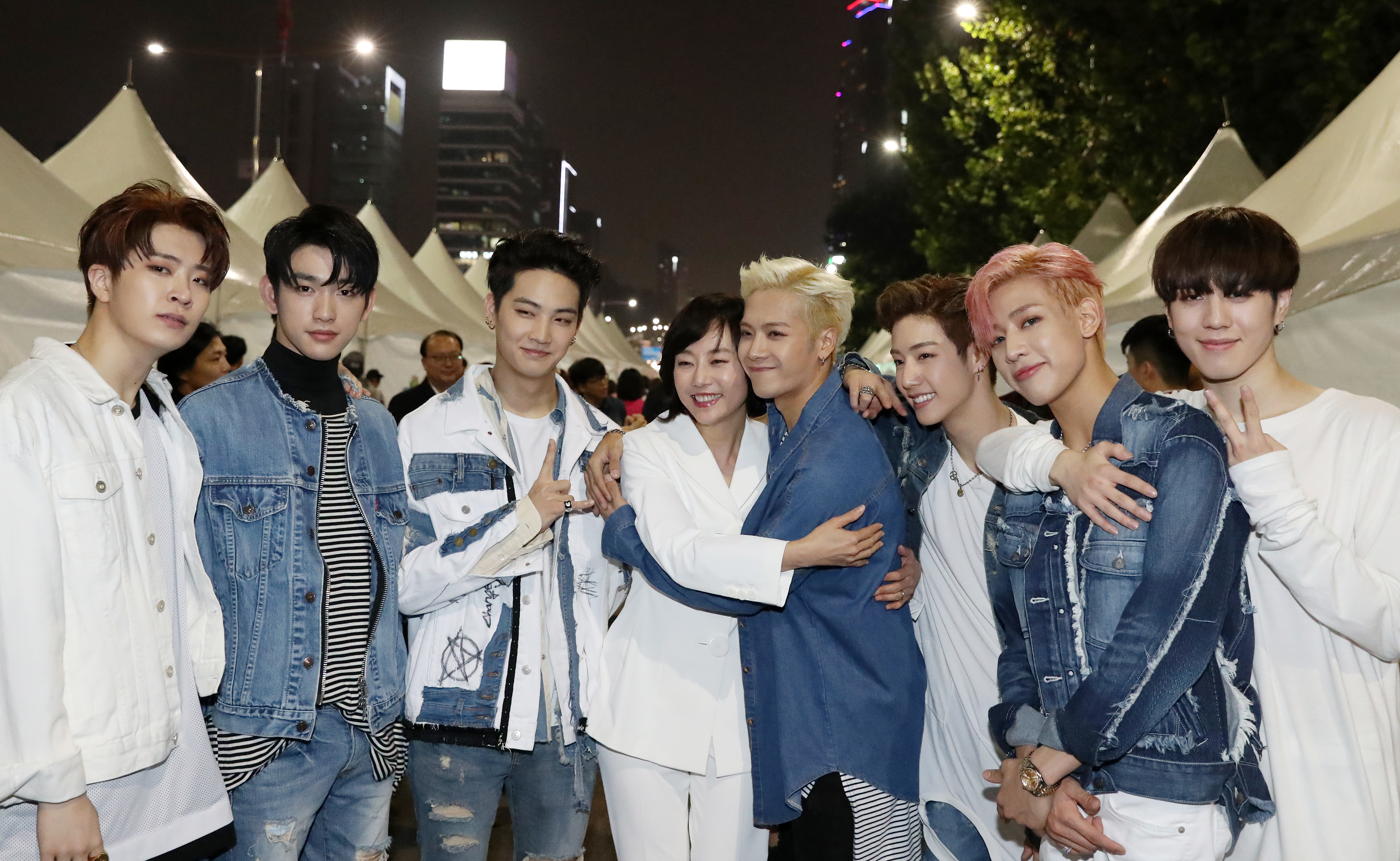
Got7 with Cho Yoonsun, the Minister of Culture, Sports and Tourism, at Korea Sale Festa in September 2016.

Got7 held the first concert of the "Fly Tour" on April 29 and 30 in Seoul, with the tour continuing on to dates in China, Japan, Thailand, Singapore and the United States throughout the summer.

In the first half of the year, the group became brand model in Thailand for It's Skin, softlens brand Bausch+Lomb, and Est Cola. For Bausch+Lomb, Mark, BamBam and Jinyoung starred in a short film titled Sanctuary, which was released on May 11.

On September 27, Got7 released their second studio album titled Flight Log: Turbulence, contributing to the composition and lyrics of 11 out of 13 tracks. It sold 200,000 album copies in South Korea on its first month and debuted at No. 1 on Billboard's World Albums Chart, selling 2,000 copies in the U.S.

On November 16, Got7 released their first Japanese EP titled Hey Yah, which took third place on the Oricon chart.

At the end of the year, Flight Log: Departure charted at No. 15 on Billboard 2016 year-end World Albums chart, marking Got7's first appearance on the chart, while the group ranked at No. 6 on the Billboard 2016 year-end World Albums Artists chart.

=== 2017: Flight Log: Arrival, My Swagger, 7 For 7, and Turn Up ===
On March 13, the third album of the Flight Log trilogy, Flight Log: Arrival, was released. The album placed first on the Gaon Weekly Album Chart in March, also topping Billboard's World Album Chart.

On May 24, the group released a new single in Japan, "My Swagger," which topped Billboard's Japan Single Chart and took second place on Oricon on the day of release.

On October 10, the group released their seventh EP titled 7 for 7, which featured songs written and composed by the members themselves. Upon release, the title track "You Are", co-composed and co-written by Jay B, topped real-time music charts in South Korea. On December 7, Got7 re-released 7 for 7 as a holiday themed "present edition".

On November 15, the group released their second Japanese EP titled Turn Up. Simultaneously they held their tour in Japan titled "Got7Japan Tour 2017: Turn Up." Starting with this album, Jackson halted his Japanese activities with the group due to health concerns and conflicting schedules.

At the end of the year, Flight Log: Arrival and 7 for 7 were the tenth and eighth best-selling albums in South Korea with more than 330,000 copies sold each.

=== 2018: Eyes On You, second world tour, THE New Era, and Present: You ===
On February 4, Got7 was selected as a global ambassador for luxury brand Shinsegae Duty Free, while on March 9, the group was appointed honorary ambassador for Korea's National Fire Agency.

On March 12, they released their eighth EP Eyes On You. The title track "Look" was co-composed and co-written by Jay B, with the other members contributing to the album as well. Following the release of the album, "Look" topped major real time charts in South Korea, becoming their most successful track on music charts since debut. The album also topped the iTunes international album charts in twenty countries and the Hanteo's daily chart on March 12 for physical album sales. "Look" entered the Gaon Download Chart in third, while Eyes on You topped the Gaon Weekly Album Chart for the week from March 11 through 17. The album also debuted on Billboard World Albums Chart at number 2. Eyes on You sold over 300,000 copies in South Korea and was certified platinum by Gaon Chart and the Korean Music Content Association (KMCA). In the same month, Got7 collaborated with global sport brand Adidas, which opened a special pop-up store under the name of '7 Eye-catching Adicolors' at Times Square in Seoul for four days and held various events. They were later selected as new models for Adidas Originals.

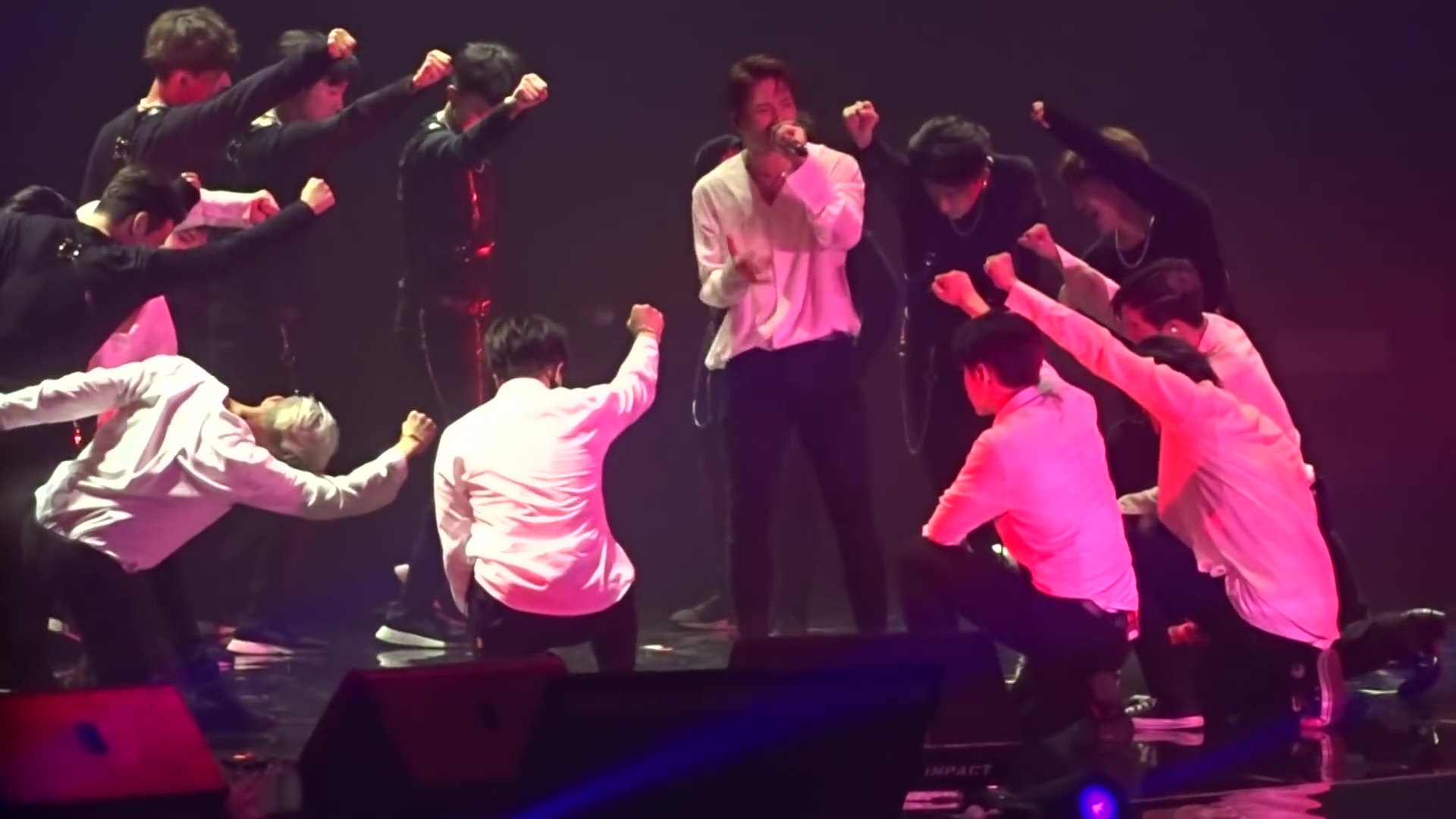
Got7 performing in Hong Kong in August 2018 during the Eyes On You World Tour.

In April, Got7 was appointed as a global ambassador of Korean beauty brand The Face Shop across 28 countries.

On May 4 to 6, Got7 kicked off their 2018 Eyes On You World Tour in Seoul, which continued throughout the summer selling out shows in Asia, Europe, North America, and South America. While touring the United States, Got7 became the first K-pop group to perform at Brooklyn's Barclays Center.

Throughout May and June Got7 simultaneously held a tour in Japan titled "Got7 Japan Fan Connecting Hall Tour 2018: THE New Era" in support of their Japanese single "THE New Era", which was released on June 20. The single topped the Oricon charts placing number one on the daily charts and on Billboard Japan.

On September 17, Got7 released their third studio album entitled Present: You, which was certified platinum by Gaon Chart on November 8, 2018, after selling over 250,000 copies.

=== 2019–2020: Jus2, Spinning Top and third world tour, Breath of Love: Last Piece ===
On January 30, Got7 released their third Japanese extended play I Won't Let You Go, which debuted at No. 1 on the Oricon Daily Album Chart with estimated sales of 22,948 copies, holding the position for the entire week and eventually topping the Oricon Weekly Album Chart for the week January 28–February 3.

On March 5, 2019, the group debuted its second sub-unit Jus2, composed of Jay B and Yugyeom, with the EP Focus.

The group released their ninth extended play, Spinning Top: Between Security & Insecurity, on May 20, 2019; they then embarked on their third world tour Keep Spinning from June 15 to October 26. They stopped at 12 countries in North America, South America and Europe, including Australia and the Philippines. During its North American stop, Got7 appeared on the Today Show on June 26, becoming the first Korean group to perform on the show.

On July 31, Got7 released their fourth Japanese extended play, Love Loop, which debuted at No. 2 on Oricon's daily albums chart. To commemorate the release, a special pop-up shop with a dedicated menu was opened in Tokyo and Osaka from July 30 to August 12. The group held the Our Loop Tour from July 30 to August 18.

The group released their tenth extended play, Call My Name, and its lead single "You Calling My Name" on November 4, 2019. They sold 100,341 copies on the first day and 224,459 copies in the first week. The EP debuted on the Billboard World Albums chart at No. 5, and also topped the Gaon Weekly Chart and the Hanteo Weekly Chart.

On November 5, Got7 were awarded the Korea Volunteering Grand Award at the 2019 Korea Sharing Volunteer Awards for their contribution to the local community.

At the end of the year, they won their first Grand Prize (daesang) at the 4th Asia Artist Awards for Performance of the Year. They also ended the year at No. 4 on Billboard's Year-End Social 50 Artists Chart.

On April 20, 2020, Got7 released their eleventh EP, Dye, along with its lead single, "Not By The Moon". They sold 159,098 copies on the first day and 281,791 copies in the first week. The EP also debuted on the Billboard World Albums chart at No. 4. On November 30, Got7 released their fourth studio album, Breath of Love: Last Piece. A pre-release single, "Breath," was released on November 23.

=== 2021–present: Departure from JYP, "Encore", Got7 and Winter Heptagon ===
On January 10, 2021, Dispatch reported that Got7 would leave JYP Entertainment at the contract's expiration. The following day, JYPE confirmed that, by mutual agreement, no member had renewed and would leave the company on January 19, 2021.

On February 19, 2021, Got7 released a teaser for an upcoming single called "Encore" on a new YouTube channel. It was released the following day through Warner Music Korea. The members focused on solo activities for the following year, ranging from acting to music; meanwhile, Jay B oversaw the transfer of the group's name and music rights, including JJ Project and Jus2, from JYP Entertainment to the members.

On May 6, 2022, they revealed a new logo and launched new social media accounts. Following the "Got7 Homecoming 2022 Fancon," which was held on May 21 to 22 both online and offline, at SK Olympic Handball Gymnasium, on May 23, 2022, Got7 released the self-titled EP, Got7, and the music video of the title song, "Nanana".

On November 30, 2024, it was reported that the band would be reuniting with a new album in late January 2025, and was currently in the planning and recording stages of the project. The comeback was confirmed by Jay B on December 7, followed shortly after by BamBam announcing the project's release date, January 20. On December 21, the group unveiled the EP's title, Winter Heptagon, together with announcing their partnership with Kakao Entertainment for its release. As part of the promotional activities and to commemorate eleven years since their debut, Got7 held the Nestfest concert at the SK Olympic Handball Gymnasium in Seoul from January 31 to February 2, and at Rajamangala Stadium in Bangkok, Thailand, on May 2 and 3. The 85,000 tickets for both shows of the stadium concert sold out on the first day of sales.

== Artistry ==
Got7 debuted as a hip-hop group incorporating martial arts tricking, a combination of elements of tricking and break dancing that was said to be an evolution of the acrobatic dance style employed by 2PM. In the following years they experimented with different styles: boyish and summery tones in "A", which led the webzine Idology to compare them to a male version of Wonder Girls rather than a repetition of 2PM; a tender and sweet atmosphere in "Just Right", and a more masculine and angry side in "If You Do" (2015).

Although they had already occasionally written some of the group's music, with the launch of the Flight Log trilogy in March 2016, Got7 began to write and compose their own songs, starting "a process of ceaseless self-experimentation and self-discovery" that led them to converge on an R&B/pop and EDM style that became their trademark and strong point: in this regard, the group spoke of the title track of Flight Log: Departure, "Fly", as "seeing the light", while NME indicated the song as "one of the crowning jewels of their reinvention", which continued with the following works. In 2017, Got7 identified fun, energetic, and lighthearted songs as the most suitable for them; later on, leader Jay B observed that, in his opinion, the group's musical identity was composed of cheerful and refreshing songs that could be enjoyed in a relaxed and easy-going way, and Vogue Korea attributed Got7's fresh, clear, and at times sweet tone to him.

Analyzing their Korean discography, NME noted how it was possible to identify a story of personal growth and to distinguish who had worked on a particular track, describing the two-way relationship between the members' personal sound and that of the group, and the ability to balance starkly different personalities, influences, inspirations and tastes and blend them into a cohesive sound, as "the best part of Got7". For Vogue Singapore, "versatility has always been a strength of Got7".

== Impact ==
Got7 attracted attention right from the announcement of their debut as JYP Entertainment's first hip-hop group. The press put them in competition with Exo and Winner, formed in 2012 and 2014 by SM Entertainment and YG Entertainment, the other two major South Korean labels besides JYPE, of which Got7 were called "the savior": since 2011 the agency had been recording increasing operating losses, and in 2013 it had fallen behind the other two companies due to the announcement of Wonder Girls' Sunye's marriage, Sohee's departure and the group's hiatus, and the ever-increasing popularity of Bae Suzy, who was overshadowing the other members of Miss A.

After a slow start, Got7 began to grow in the market with the Flight Log trilogy, which began in March 2016 with Flight Log: Departure. In 2016, they were JYP Entertainment's best-selling artist after 2PM and Suzy, and later became the agency's highest-grossing male group. In 2017, with 820,000 albums sold, they were the fourth best-selling group of the year in South Korea. Before leaving JYP Entertainment in early 2021, their albums accounted for 25% of the label's music sales for two years, earning 20 billion won in 2020.

They are considered a representative group of the third generation of K-pop and Korean music in general along with BTS, Exo and Seventeen, and one of the first to have members of different nationalities. In 2022, Rolling Stone India called them "one of the biggest K-pop groups of this decade".

In 2014, with two extended plays and a studio album, Got7 began to rapidly emerge as Hallyu idols in Japan and Thailand. From 2014 to 2020, they occupied the top 3 of the most mentioned music artists on Twitter in South Korea, ranking first in 2015, when they also ranked second globally. In 2019, Forbes Korea listed them as the 37th most mentioned domestic celebrity who contributed to the spread of Korean culture abroad. In annual surveys conducted by the South Korean Ministry of Culture, Sports and Tourism abroad, Got7 ranked tenth among the most popular Korean singers in 2019, and twelfth among the most popular K-pop artists in the world in 2022.

Over the years, it has been noted that Got7's popularity was greater abroad than in South Korea. Their biggest hit in their home country was the 2016 song "Hard Carry", preceded by the 2015 songs "Just Right" and "If You Do". Abroad, Got7's popularity is particularly strong in Thailand, where their fandom has steadily grown since the group's participation in the Tofu Music Festival in 2014. In the country, Got7 have signed advertising deals for cosmetics, drinks, contact lenses, and insurance companies. In a survey about role models conducted on January 13, 2018, by Adecco Thailand among 2,044 children aged 7-14, the group ranked second after parents, citing their dancing and singing skills as reasons for their choice.

== Members ==
- Mark (마크)
- Jay B (제이비) – leader
- Jackson (잭슨)
- Jinyoung (진영)
- Youngjae (영재)
- BamBam (뱀뱀)
- Yugyeom (유겸)

== Discography ==
- Identify (2014)
- Moriagatteyo (2016)
- Flight Log: Turbulence (2016)
- Present: You (2018)
- Breath of Love: Last Piece (2020)

== Filmography ==
- Dream Knight (2015)

== Concert tours ==
- Fly Tour (2016)
- Eyes on You Tour (2018)
- Keep Spinning World Tour (2019)

== Philanthropy ==
In February 2017, donation area G+ Star Zone re-opened, decorated with life-size portraits of Got7, to raise funds in their name to help financially disadvantaged teenagers.

In April 2019, the group donated ₩30 million (equivalent to ₩35.17 million or US$24,736.23 in 2025) to the Hope Bridge National Reunion Relief Association to help people affected by the forest fires in Gangwon-do. For the Keep Spinning World Tour in 2019, they launched the "Keep Spinning, Keep Dreaming with Got7" project, together with the Make-A-Wish Foundation, to comfort seriously ill children and give them the opportunity to attend their concerts and meet them.
