= Got It? =

- Digital cover

EP by Got7
- Released: January 20, 2014
- Recorded: JYP Studio, Seoul, South Korea; 2013
- Genres: K-pop; hip hop
- Length: 20:51
- Labels: JYP Entertainment; KT Music
- Producer: J.Y. Park "The Asiansoul"

Got7 chronology
Got It? (2014)	Got Love (2014)

Singles from Got It?
- 1. "Girls Girls Girls" Released: January 20, 2014

Got It? is the debut extended play by South Korean boy band Got7, released on January 20, 2014.

== Composition ==
"Hello" combines 808 and bass guitar, while "Girls Girls Girls" is a hip hop and electropop song written, composed, and produced by J.Y. Park; it contains a sample of the exclamation "eomona" (어머나) from Wonder Girls' "Tell Me". The lyrics are cocky and the chorus features lines such as "Even when I shake my body a little, even when I don't do anything, girls, girls, girls they love me." "I Like You" fuses elements of R&B and hip hop with an electronic sitar and a Bollywood-inspired beat. "Follow Me" is based on southern hip hop and "Like Oh" blends urban club and EDM. The album closes with "Playground", an R&B piece that expresses the excitement and joy of finding a new love, compared to the dreams and memories of childhood. The theme of the song is not love, but "me".

== Track listing ==
Credits adapted from Korea Music Copyright Association's database.

No.	Title	Writer(s)	Music	Length
1.	"여보세요" (Hello)	Chloe, Noday	Chloe, Noday	3:38
2.	"Girls Girls Girls"	J.Y. Park "The Asiansoul"	J.Y. Park "The Asiansoul"	3:35
3.	"난 니가 좋아" (I Like You)	J.Y. Park "The Asiansoul"	J.Y. Park "The Asiansoul"	3:24
4.	"따라와" (Follow Me)	S. bros, Blue Sun	S. bros	3:10
5.	"Like Oh"	Lee Woomin "collapsedone", Crizzy, Guy	Lee Woomin "collapsedone", Fredrik "Fredro" Ödesjö, Crizzy, Guy	3:39
6.	"Playground"	mr.cho	mr.cho	3:33
Total length:				20:51

== Charts ==
Weekly chart performance for Got It?
Chart (2014)	Peak position
South Korean Albums (Gaon)	2
US World Albums (Billboard)	1

Monthly chart performance for Got It?
Chart (2014)	Peak position
South Korean Albums (Gaon)	9

Yearly chart performance for Got It?
Chart (2014)	Peak position
South Korean Albums (Gaon)	43
