= Choi Young-jae =

South Korean singer (born 1996)

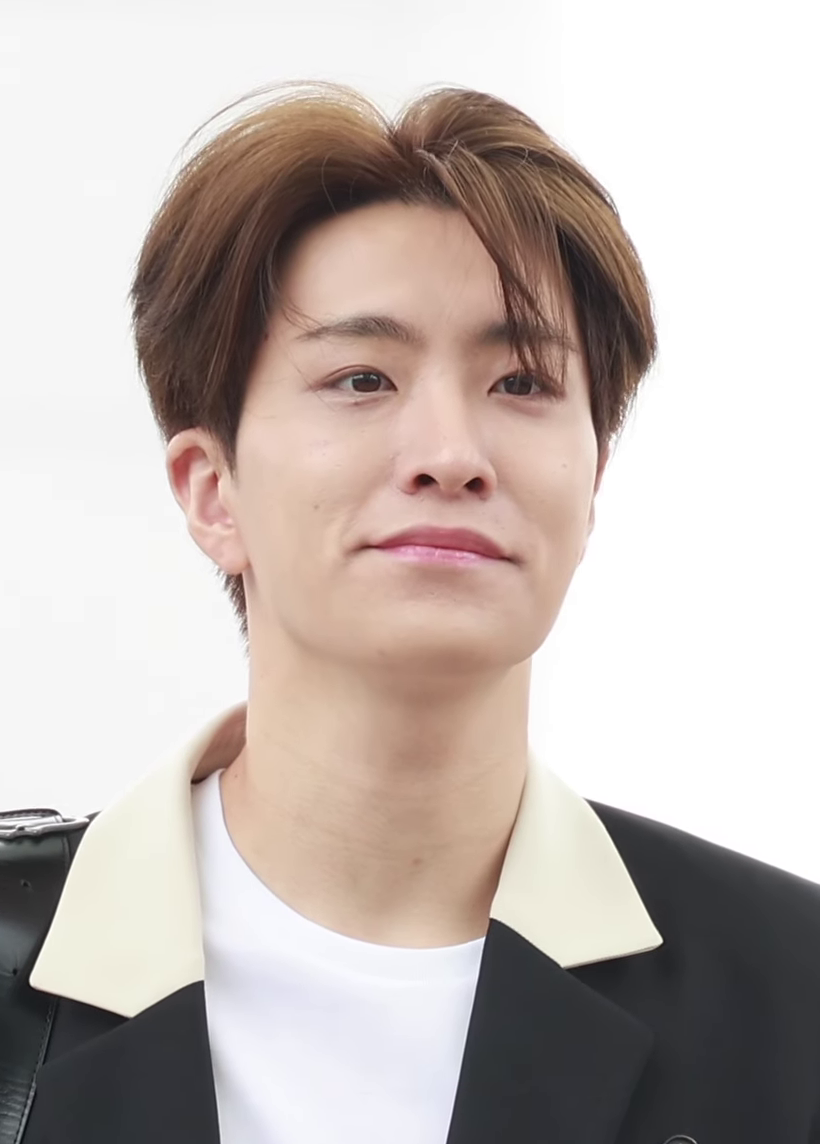
- Youngjae in June 2025
- Born: 17 September 1996 (age 30); Mokpo, South Korea
- Education: Daekyeung University
- Occupations: Singer; songwriter; actor; DJ
- Agent: AndBut Company
- Musical career
- Also known as: Ars
- Genres: K-pop; J-pop; R&B
- Instrument: Vocals
- Years active: 2014–present
- Labels: JYP; Sony Japan
- Member of: Got7
- Website: Official website

Korean name
- Hangul: 최영재
- Hanja: 崔榮宰
- RR: Choe Yeongjae
- MR: Ch'oe Yŏngjae

Signature
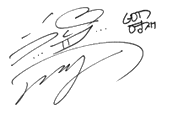

Choi Young-jae (Korean: 최영재; born 17 September 1996), professionally known by the mononym Youngjae, is a South Korean singer-songwriter and actor. He is a member of the South Korean boy band Got7.

== Biography ==
Choi started dreaming of becoming a singer in his childhood, when he sang with his older brother. When the latter enlisted in the military, he joined a practical music academy in his hometown, Mokpo, to learn more professionally, working part-time to earn the necessary money. In 2011, he won the Vocal Excellence Award at Mokpo Youth Music Festival. In 2013, JYP Entertainment held a closed audition in the academy and he became a trainee.

== Career ==
=== 2013–2020: Debut and solo activities ===
After one month of training in Seoul, Choi was added to the project group to form JYPE new boy band. After a total of 7 months of training, he subsequently debuted as the main vocalist of the seven member boy group, Got7, with the single "Girls Girls Girls", released on 16 January 2014, from the group's first EP Got It?. In early times after the debut, Choi mentioned his dream was to become a music therapist.

He has been writing songs and lyrics under the name Ars since 2016, starting with "Rewind" in Got7's extended play Flight Log: Departure.

Choi had a collaboration with Sanjoy and Elliott Yamin in 2017 on the song "Victim of Love", while he recorded "I'm All Ears" with Park Ji-min for the Life Insurance Social Philanthropy Foundation's youth suicide prevention campaign in 2018. The song was released on 15 October alongside its music video.

In the spring of 2019, he joined Jus2 in their 'Focus' Premiere Showcase in Asia, acting as the MC for Tokyo (10–11 April) and Osaka (17–18 April) stops.

In 2018 and 2020, he sang "At the Usual Time" (그 시간에) and "Fall In Love" (빠져드나봐) for the original soundtracks of TV dramas Wok of Love and When My Love Blooms. Together with Day6's Young K, he became the new DJ of MBC Radio Idol Radio starting from 18 May 2020. The first season of the show ended on 25 September.

On 25 May 2020, in collaboration with Howlpot, a pet product design brand, he launched Ars X Coco, a clothing store for people and dogs, which ran for two weeks until 8 June . The proceeds, amounting to 15 million won, were donated to Korea Animal Rights Advocates's The Bom Center, a non-profit care center for abandoned dogs. In the same year, Choi competed in the Idol Star Dog Championships, a dog agility competition, which aired as a Chuseok special on MBC on 2 October.

On 25 September 2020, he was cast in Netflix's new sitcom So Not Worth It, which tells the stories of a group of multicultural students living in a college dorm. The series became available on 18 June 2021, and he sang the homonymous OST for it. With his portrayal of Sam, the son of the CEO of a food chain based in Australia, he drew attention, and was praised for his acting, communication skills, vocalization and pronunciation, which, along with Choi's facial expressions, realistically expressed the character's emotions.

=== 2021–2022: Departure from JYPE, Midnight Sun and solo debut ===
Following the expiration of his contract with JYP Entertainment, he signed an exclusive contract with Sublime Artist Agency on 20 January 2021.

On 9 March 2021, it was announced that Choi had joined the cast of Midnight Sun, a musical adaptation of Japanese movie A Song to the Sun, in the leading role of Ha-ram. Midnight Sun was performed from 1 May until 25 July at the Kwanglim Arts Center. He starred in 22 out of 95 shows. Two of the songs, "Meet Me When the Sun Goes Down" and "Good-bye Days", were also released as singles by each main actor: Choi's version of "Meet Me When the Sun Goes Down" was released on 9 April as part 1 of the musical's soundtrack, while his collaboration with Lovelyz' Kei on "Good-bye Days", on 7 June.

On 1 April, it was confirmed that Choi was selected as campaign artist for Levi's Red alongside Lim Na-young. On 20 April, he took part in Levi's 501® Day Music Concert, where he performed self-written song "Lonely", Sole's "Ride" and Christopher's "Bad".

On 7 May, he released the soundtrack "Pop Star" for the web series So I Married the Anti-fan.

On 5 October, he made his solo debut with his first extended play, Colors from Ars, and its title track "Vibin". Six days later, he released a fall-winter clothes collection in collaboration with Korean casual brand Plac. He then performed at K-pop cheering concert, We All Are One 2021 to overcome COVID-19 on 31 October.

In November, he was confirmed to play his first lead role, Kim Seung-hyu, in the upcoming Cine de Rama rom-com web series Love & Wish, based on the webtoon of the same name. Love & Wish was released through domestic and overseas OTT platforms between 24 and 25 December along with the original soundtrack, for which Choi sang "Day by Day".

On 15 December, he released the digital single "Walk With Me".

On 28 March 2022, Choi became the new fixed DJ of MBC Radio's Best Friend. On 21 June, he released his second extended play, Sugar, which debuted at #5 on the Circle Chart. Between 23 July and 7 August, Choi held the Sugar mini concert tour in Manila, Singapore and Bangkok. On 6 August 2022, he was awarded the Best Asia Artist and Actor Award at Ganesha Awards, as well as being appointed Ambassador of Cultural Friendship and Tourism Promotion to ASEAN. In October 2022, as part of a collaborative project with Esquire Korea and casual fashion brand Covernat, Choi and Yerin released the digital single "Colors". Part of the profits was donated to patients of Lou Gehrig's disease.

=== 2023–present: Do It ===
On 12 March 2023, Choi released the digital single "Errr Day". On 3 May, he was announced as part of the line-up of the 10th anniversary run of the musical The Days, in the role of Moo-young, which was played from 12 July to 3 September. He was praised for his stability in singing, acting performance and dialogue delivery.

On 3 October 2023, he was named honorary ambassador of the Korea-Thailand Mutual Visit Years by the Ministry of Culture, Sports and Tourism of South Korea.

On 6 November 2023, Choi released his first full album Do It. Between February and March, he performed in Taiwan, the Philippines, Thailand and Japan for the Inside Out Asia Tour. On 2 April 2024, it was announced that he had parted ways with Sublime after three years. Two months later he signed an exclusive contract with AndBut Company. On 1 July Choi announced the Once in a Dream Asia Tour, to be held in August and September.

In January 2025 he was cast as Song Sam-dong in the show musical Dream High, which was performed in Seoul from 5 April to 1 June. The production team had initially offered him to sing the OST, but when they heard him sing during the recording, they decided to cast him. He also played Nam Byung-jin in the series Friendly Rivalry, gaining favorable reviews for his acting and the drastic image change.

On 9 July 2025, Choi released the digital single Fermata, embarking on an Asia tour in September and October. On 10 September 2025, he became the Asia ambassador of Thai mattress brand Lunio.

Choi announced during a solo concert in Thailand on 26 October 2025 that he would begin his mandatory military service on 27 November. He would serve as a social service worker.

== Personal life ==
=== Education ===
Choi studied shipbuilding machinery at Mokpo Technical High School, then, in 2012, he moved to Seoul's Korean Arts High School, from which he graduated in February 2015. He got accepted into Seokyeong University's Department of Theater and Film, then he moved to and graduated from International Cyber University. As of 2021, he's enrolled at Hanyang Cyber Graduate School.

=== Philanthropy ===
In August 2020, he registered as an organ donor. In May 2021, he participated in the "I Rose You" campaign planned by the Love Organ Donation Movement Headquarters to promote organ donation, and to express gratitude, respect and condolences to organ donors and their families.

In December 2025, he donated ₩30 million to the Korean Dogs' Rainbow Shelter for abandoned dogs, where he was also volunteering. He donated another ₩10 million for his birthday in September 2026.

== Discography ==
=== Studio albums ===
List of studio albums, with selected details, peak chart positions and sales
Title	Details	Peak chart positions	Sales
Title	Details	KOR	Sales
Do It	Released: 6 November 2023; Label: Sublime; Formats: CD, digital download, streaming	13	KOR: 20,163

=== Extended plays ===
List of extended plays, with selected details, peak chart positions and sales
Title	Details	Peak chart positions		Sales
Title	Details	KOR	JPN Down.	Sales
Colors from Ars	Released: 5 October 2021; Label: Sublime; Formats: CD, digital download, streaming	6	41	KOR: 77,138
Sugar	Released: 21 June 2022; Label: Sublime; Formats: CD, digital download, streaming	5	59	KOR: 65,632

=== Single albums ===
List of single albums, with selected details, peak chart positions and sales
Title	Details	Peak chart positions	Sales
Title	Details	KOR	Sales
T.P.O	Released: 9 July 2024; Label: AndBut; Formats: CD, digital download, streaming; Tracklist: 1. "T.P.O"; 2. "Summer Happening" (이상기온)	23	KOR: 7,825
Fermata	Released: 9 July 2025; Label: AndBut; Formats: digital download, streaming; Tracklist: 1. "Escape To Me" (도망치는 건 부끄럽지만); 2. "Here We Go"	—	—N/a

=== Singles ===
Title	Year	Peak chart positions	Album
Title	Year	KOR	Album
As lead artist
"My Day" (내 하루)	2016	— (Note: Songs released on SoundCloud.)	Non-commercial singles
"Trauma"	2016	—	Non-commercial singles
"Call Button" (통화버튼) (feat. J.praize)	2017	—	Non-commercial singles
"I Want to Fall Asleep" (잠들고 싶어) (feat. Noday)	2017	—	Non-commercial singles
"Everything for You"	2020	—	Non-album single
"Vibin"	2021	124	Colors from Ars
"Walk with Me" (같이 걸어가줘요)	2021	— (Note: "Walk with Me" did not enter the Circle Digital Chart, but it peaked at number 37 on the component Download Chart.)	Non-album single
"Sugar"	2022	— (Note: "Sugar" did not enter the Circle Digital Chart, but it peaked at number 9 on the component Download Chart.)	Sugar
"Errr Day"	2023	— (Note: "Errr Day" did not enter the Circle Digital Chart, but it peaked at number 37 on the component Download Chart.)	Do It
"Best Friend" (친한 친구)	2023	— (Note: "Best Friend" did not enter the Circle Digital Chart, but it peaked at number 67 on the component Download Chart.)	Non-album single
"T.P.O"	2024	— (Note: "T.P.O" did not enter the Circle Digital Chart, but it peaked at number 10 on the component Download Chart.)	T.P.O
"Escape To Me" (도망치는 건 부끄럽지만)	2025	— (Note: "Escape To Me" did not enter the Circle Digital Chart, but it peaked at number 87 on the component Download Chart.)	Fermata
Collaborations
"I'm All Ears" (다둘어줄게) (with Jamie)	2018	—	Ready to Listen Part 2
"Irreplaceable" (with F.Hero feat. The Toys)	2022	— (Note: "Irreplaceable" did not enter the Circle Digital Chart, but it peaked at number 133 on the component Download Chart.)	Non-album singles
"Colors" (with Yerin)	2022	— (Note: "Colors" did not enter the Circle Digital Chart, but it peaked at number 90 on the component Download Chart.)	Non-album singles
"Old Song" (오래된 노래) (with Ken, Hui and Choi Sang-yeop)	2025	— (Note: "Old Song" did not enter the Circle Digital Chart, but it peaked at number 41 on the component Download Chart.)	Non-album singles
As featured artist
"One Dream One Korea" (Various artists)	2015	—	Non-album singles
"Victim of Love" (Sanjoy feat. Ars, Stephen Rezza and Elliott Yamin)	2017	—	Non-album singles
"Hurry" (우린 서둘러) (Lovey feat. Youngjae)	2021	—	:)
"Finale" (Loops feat. Youngjae)	2023	—	WET! Final
Soundtrack appearances
"At the Usual Time" (그 시간에)	2018	—	Wok of Love OST Part 2
"Fall in Love" (빠져드나봐) (with Choi Jung-yoon)	2020	—	When My Love Blooms OST Part 2
"Meet Me When the Sun Goes Down" (태양이 지면 널 만나러 갈게)	2021	—	Midnight Sun OST Part 1
"Pop Star"	2021	—	So I Married the Anti-fan OST Part 1
"Good-bye Days" (with Kei)	2021	—	Midnight Sun OST Part 5
"So Not Worth It" (내일 지구가 망해버렸으면 좋겠어)	2021	—	So Not Worth It OST
"You and I" (그대와) (with Laboum's Soyeon)	2021	—	My Roommate Is a Gumiho OST Part 7
"Day by Day"	2021	—	Love & Wish OST
"Closer" (with Jay B)	2022	—	Good Job OST Part 1
"On My Way"	2022	—	The Golden Spoon OST Part 7
"Starlight"	2025	— (Note: "Starlight" did not enter the Circle Digital Chart, but it peaked at number 30 on the component Download Chart.)	Dream High OST
"Highlight"	2026	—	The Practical Guide to Love OST Part 1
"—" denotes releases that did not chart.

=== Songwriting credits ===
All song credits are adapted from the Korea Music Copyright Association's database, unless otherwise noted.

Year	Artist	Title	Album	Lyrics		Music	
Year	Artist	Title	Album	Credited	With	Credited	With
2016	Got7	"Rewind"	Flight Log: Departure	Yes	Joo Chan-yang	Yes	Joo Chan-yang, Command Freaks
2016	Got7	"Hey"	Flight Log: Turbulence	Yes	Kim Won, Oh Hyun-joo	Yes	Kim Won
2016	Got7	"Sick" (아파)	Flight Log: Turbulence	Yes	Mark, Jackson Wang	Yes	Damon Sharpe, Carlos Battey, Gregg Pagani
2017	Got7	"Sign"	Flight Log: Arrival	Yes	Noday, Chloe	Yes	Noday, Chloe
2017	Got7	"Moon U"	7 for 7	Yes	Maxx Song, BamBam, Joo Chan-yang	Yes	Joo Chan-yang, Command Freaks
2017	Got7	"In This Chest" (この胸に)	Turn Up	Yes	Noday, Risa Horie	Yes	Noday
2018	Got7	"Hesitate" (망설이다)	Eyes on You	Yes	AMIllO	Yes	5S, AMIllO
2018	Got7	"Nobody Knows" (혼자)	Present: You	Yes	Joo Chan-yang	Yes	Joo Chan-yang, Lavin
2018	Got7	"1:31AM" (잘 지내야해)	Present: You & Me	Yes	Defsoul	Yes	Defsoul, 220, minGtion
2018	Got7	"Think About It"	Present: You & Me	Yes	Defsoul, Mark	Yes	Defsoul, Mirror Boy, Lee Sang-chul
2019	Got7	"Reborn"	I Won't Let You Go	Yes	Defsoul, Yuuki Shirai	Yes	Defsoul, Mirror Boy
2019	Got7	"Time Out"	Spinning Top	Yes	Noday, Versa Choi	Yes	Noday, Versa Choi
2019	Got7	"Memorandum" (備忘録)	Love Loop	Yes	Noday, Co-sho	Yes	Philip, Noday
2020	Got7	"Aura"	Dye	Yes	Joo Chan-yang, Nihwa	Yes	Joo Chan-yang, Nihwa, Lavin
2020	Got7	"Gravity"	Dye	Yes	Noday	Yes	Noday
2020	Got7	"Breath" (넌 날 숨 쉬게 해)	Breath of Love: Last Piece	Yes	Joo Chan-yang, Lavin, Nihwa	Yes	Joo Chan-yang, Lavin, Nihwa
2020	Youngjae	"Everything For You"	Non-album single	Yes	I'm Sang-hoon	No	—N/a
2021	Youngjae	"Beautiful"	Colors from Ars	Yes	Boytoy, Kuro (Blatinum)	Yes	Boytoy, Disko (Blatinum), Kuro (Blatinum)
2021	Youngjae	"Tasty"	Colors from Ars	Yes	Boytoy, Peter Hyun (Blatinum), Young Sky (Blatinum), Houdini	Yes	Boytoy, Peter Hyun (Blatinum)
2021	Youngjae	"Vibin"	Colors from Ars	Yes	Boytoy, ADN, WD, Young Sky (Blatinum), Peter Hyun (Blatinum)	Yes	Boytoy, Disko (Blatinum), ADN, WD
2021	Youngjae	"Roses"	Colors from Ars	Yes	Boytoy, Young Sky (Blatinum), Peter Hyun (Blatinum)	Yes	Boytoy, Young Sky (Blatinum), Peter Hyun (Blatinum)
2021	Youngjae	"Eternal"	Colors from Ars	Yes	—N/a	Yes	Boytoy, Jay & Rudy, Aaron Kim, Isaac Han, Kial
2021	Youngjae	"Moonlight"	Colors from Ars	Yes	Boytoy, Houdini	Yes	Boytoy, Aaron Kim, Isaac Han, Houdini
2021	Youngjae	"Lonely"	Colors from Ars	Yes	Noday	Yes	Noday
2021	Youngjae	"Walk With Me" (같이 걸어가줘요)	Non-album single	Yes	Boytoy, Junsoo (Atunes), 2uzoo (Blatinum)	Yes	Boytoy, Disko, Junsoo (Atunes), 2uzoo (Blatinum), LoveTom
2021	Lovey	"Hurry" (우린 서둘러)	:)	Yes	Lovey, Brother Su	Yes	Lovey, Brother Su
2022	Got7	"Drive Me to the Moon"	Got7	Yes	Kim Hye-soo	Yes	Boytoy, Disko, Brite Ma, ADN Lewis
2022	Youngjae	"Sugar"	Sugar	Yes	Jay & Rudy	Yes	Boytoy, Disko, Jay & Rudy, Isaac Han, Aron Kim, Ghostchild Ltd
2022	Youngjae	"Focus"	Sugar	Yes	Peter Hyun, Kinsha	Yes	Boytoy, Disko, Peter Hyun
2022	Youngjae	"Crema"	Sugar	Yes	Boytoy, Atunes	Yes	Boytoy, Atunes
2022	Youngjae	"Nothing"	Sugar	Yes	Hahm, D'tour	Yes	Boytoy, Aron Kim, Hahm, Kay, John Thomas
2022	Youngjae	"With You"	Sugar	Yes	Boytoy, TopTier, Kunyo	Yes	Boytoy, TopTier
2022	Youngjae, Yerin	"Colors"	Non-album single	Yes	Boytoy, Junsoo (Blatinum), Showwer (Blatinum), Warming (Atunes)	Yes	Boytoy, Junsoo (Blatinum), Showwer (Blatinum), Warming (Atunes)
2023	Youngjae	"Errr Day"	Do It	Yes	Boytoy, Junsoo (Blatinum), Oat (Blatinum)	Yes	Boytoy, Disko (Blatinum), Junsoo (Blatinum), Oat (Blatinum)
2023	Youngjae	"Best Friend" (친한친구)	Non-album single	Yes	Brother Su	Yes	Brother Su
2023	Youngjae	"Flower"	Do It	Yes	Joo Chan-yang (Pollen), Lavin	Yes	Joo Chan-yang (Pollen), Lavin
2023	Youngjae	"Do It"	Do It	Yes	Bullseye (Avec), Ley (Avec)	Yes	Boytoy, Bullseye (Avec), Ley (Avec), Disko
2023	Youngjae	"Deal"	Do It	Yes	Brother Su, Paprikaa, Jonghan	Yes	Brother Su, Paprikaa, Jonghan, Boytoy, Junsoo, Showwer
2023	Youngjae	"Dreaming Again"	Do It	Yes	Noday	Yes	Noday, Versa Choi
2023	Youngjae	"Problem"	Do It	Yes	Bullseye (Avec), Ondine (Avec)	Yes	Boytoy, Bullseye (Avec), Flip_00, 37
2023	Youngjae	"Fluffy"	Do It	Yes	Brother Su	Yes	Brother Su
2023	Youngjae	"Snooze"	Do It	Yes	Brother Su	No	—N/a
2023	Youngjae	"Thinking of You" (자꾸 네가)	Do It	Yes	—N/a	Yes	Boytoy, Aron Kim, Mojo (Plz)
2023	Youngjae	"Never Leave You Alone"	Do It	Yes	—N/a	Yes	Boytoy, Disko
2024	Youngjae	"T.P.O"	T.P.O	No	—N/a	Yes	Brother Su, Paprikaa, Jonghan, Junsoo (Atunes), Showwer (Atunes), Boytoy
2024	Youngjae	"Summer Happening" (이상 기온)	T.P.O	Yes	Brother Su	Yes	Brother Su
2025	Got7	"Our Youth" (청춘드라마)	Winter Heptagon	Yes	Brother Su	Yes	Brother Su, Eniac, Chicok
2025	Got7	"Yours Truly," (우리가할수있는말은.)	Winter Heptagon	Yes	Got7	No	—N/a
2025	Youngjae	"Here We Go"	Fermata	Yes	Brother Su	Yes	Brother Su

== Filmography ==
=== Dramas ===
Year	Title	Role	Note	Ref.
2015	Dream Knight	Himself	Web series	
2021	ONAIR - Secret Contract		Sitcom, cameo	
2021	So Not Worth It	Sam	Sitcom	
2021	Love & Wish	Kim Seung-hyu	Web series	
2024	Dare to Love Me		TV series, cameo (episode 16)	
2025	Friendly Rivalry	Nam Byeong-jin	TV series	

=== Variety shows ===
Year	Title	Role	Note	Ref.
2017	King of Mask Singer	Contestant	as Game Machine (Episode 93–94)	
2018	Immortal Songs: Singing the Legend	Contestant	3 February, singing Kim Yeon-ja's "Mercury Lamp"	
2021	Coco is Genius	Host	YouTube series, 8 episodes	
2021	Idol Live Agent	Host	YouTube series	
2021–present	Twerebi	Host	YouTube series	
2022	Seven Stars	Mentor	Thai audition program	
2023	B-Side Track	Host	YouTube series	

=== Radio presenting ===
Year	Title	Role	Note	Ref.
2015	FM Starry Night	Guest	7 July	
2015	Kiss The Radio	Special host	with Jay B (15 October)	
2016	Kiss The Radio	Special host	with Jinyoung (3 June)	
2017	Kiss The Radio	Special host	with Jinyoung (23–26 October)	
2018	Kiss The Radio	Special host	with Jinyoung (15 January) and Yugyeom (5–6 March)	
2020	Idol Radio	Special host	with Jay B (episodes 572, 574, 27–28 April) and Day6's Young K (6, 9–10 May)	
2020	Idol Radio	Host	with Young K (episode 594–714, 18 May–25 September)	
2021	Kim Shin-young's Hope Song at Noon	Special host	with BamBam (6 July)	
2022	Dream Radio	Special host	17 January–6 February	
2022–2024	Got7 Youngjae's Best Friend	Host	From 28 March 2022 – 22 November 2024	

=== Hosting ===
Year	Title	Note	Ref.
2024	33rd Seoul Music Awards	with Lee Seung-gi, Tiffany, and Got7's BamBam	

=== Theater ===
Year	Title	Role	Notes	Ref.
2021	Midnight Sun	Jung Ha-ram	Lead role	
2023	The Days	Moo-young	Lead role	
2025	Dream High	Song Sam-dong	Lead role	

== Music videos ==
Year	Title	Artist	Director	Notes
2018	"At the Usual Time" (그 시간에)	Choi Young-jae		
2018	"Nobody Knows" (혼자)	Got7	Naive Creative Production	Solo song from Got7's album Present: You
2018	"I'm All Ears" (다둘어줄게)	Choi Young-jae and Park Ji-min		"Ready to Listen" suicide prevention campaign run by Life Insurance Social Philanthropy Foundation of Korea
2020	"Fall In Love" (빠져드나봐)	Choi Young-jae and Choi Jung-yoon		Original soundtrack for When My Love Blooms
2020	"Everything For You"	Choi Young-jae		Life sharing donation campaign promoted by the Korean Network for Organ Sharing
2021	"Vibin"	Youngjae	96Wave	
2021	"Day by Day"	Youngjae		Original soundtrack for Love & Wish
2022	"Sugar"	Youngjae	Paxq (Ndvisual)	
2022	"Irreplaceable"	F.Hero and Youngjae feat. The Toys	Thicha T., Lee Jae-hyun	
2022	"Closer"	Jay B and Youngjae		Original soundtrack for Good Job
2022	"Colors"	Youngjae and Yerin	Kim Hyun-jae	
2023	"Errr Day"	Youngjae		
2023	"Do It"	Youngjae	Kang Yena, Lee Hangyeol	
2025	"Escape To Me"	Youngjae	Ro Rockhoon	

== Awards and nominations ==
Award ceremony	Year	Category	Nominee / Work	Result	Ref.
Brand of the Year Awards	2023	Best Radio DJ	Choi Young-jae (Got7 Youngjae's Best Friend)	Won	
Ganesha Awards	2022	Best Asia Artist and Actor Award	Choi Young-jae	Won	
Korea First Brand Awards	2023	Most Anticipated Radio DJ	Choi Young-jae (Got7 Youngjae's Best Friend)	Won	
Korean Wave Entertainment Awards	2026	Best OST	"Highlight"	Nominated	
Line Melody Music Awards	2022	Melody of the Year	"Irreplaceable"	Nominated	
Line Melody Music Charts	2022	Black Melody Award for Most Downloaded Song (September)	"Irreplaceable"	Won	
MBC Entertainment Awards	2022	Rookie Award (Radio)	Choi Young-jae (Got7 Youngjae's Best Friend)	Won	
Newsis Hallyu Expo	2026	Global OST Popularity Award	"Highlight"	Longlisted	
Seoul Music Awards	2024	Global Producer Award	Choi Young-jae	Won	
Supersound Festival	2023	Asian Fans Choice of the Year	Choi Young-jae	Won	
Supersound Festival	2025	Super Male Vocalist	Choi Young-jae	Won	
WeTV Awards 2022	2023	WeTV Artist of the Year	Choi Young-jae (Love & Wish)	Won	
