= List of awards and nominations received by Got7 =

Got7 awards and nominations
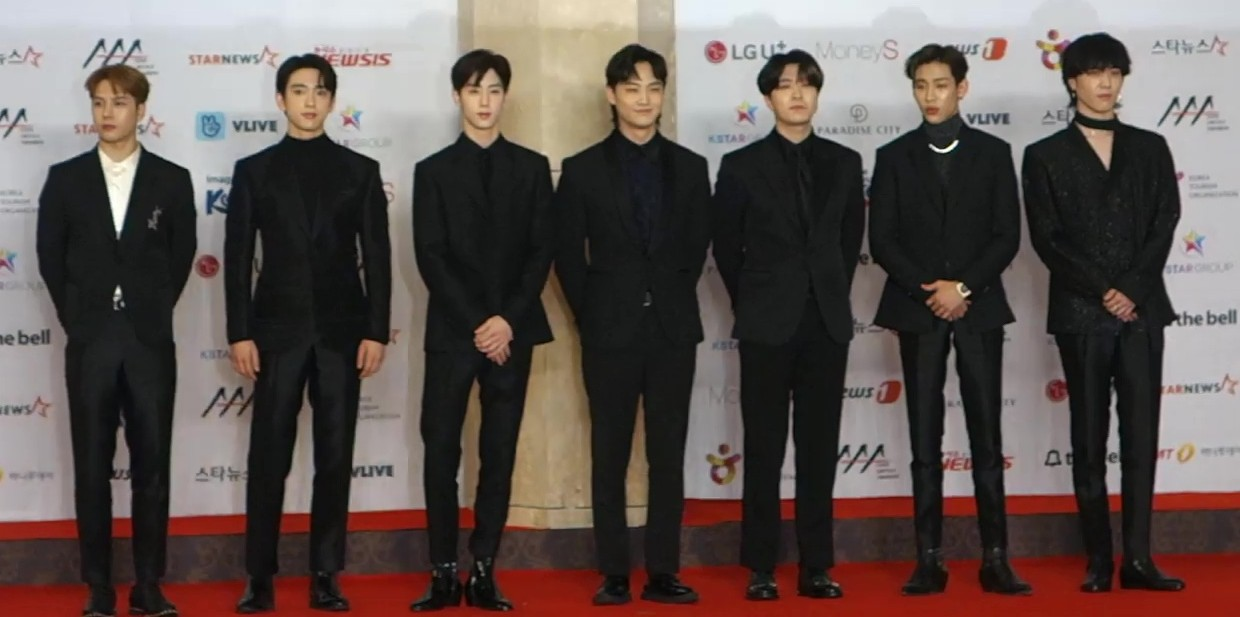
- Got7 at the 2018 Asia Artist Awards
Awards and nominations
Award	Wins	Nominations
Anugerah Bintang Popular Berita Harian	0	1
APAN Music Awards	1	3
Asia Artist Awards	5	12
Asian Pop Music Awards	1	3
Billboard Music Awards	0	2
Bravo Otto	1	1
Channel R Radio Awards	0	1
The Fact Music Awards	1	6
Fashion Power Awards	1	1
Gaon Chart Music Awards	3	13
Genie Music Awards	0	5
Golden Disc Awards	7	29
Hanteo Music Awards	0	2
iMBC Awards	0	1
JOOX Thailand Music Awards	3	5
KM Chart Awards	0	1
Korea First Brand Awards	1	1
Line Melody Music Awards	1	2
Line Melody Music Chart	1	1
Line Thailand People's Choice Awards	2	2
MAMA Awards	9	36
MTV Europe Music Awards	1	3
NetEase Cloud Music Awards	0	1
Philippine K-pop Awards	0	1
SBS Gayo Daejeon	1	1
SEED Awards	1	1
Seoul Music Awards	3	38
Soompi Awards	3	4
Soribada Best K-Music Awards	0	8
Teen Choice Awards	0	1
Telehit Awards	0	1
Thairath Online Awards	0	1
Top Chinese Music Awards	1	1
V Live Awards	7	8
YinYueTai V Chart Awards	1	1
Youku Night Awards	1	1

Totals (Note: Certain award groups do not simply award one winner. They acknowledge several different recipients, have runners-up, and have third place. Since this is a specific recognition and is different from losing an award, runner-up mentions are considered wins in this award tally. For simplification and to avoid errors, each award in this list has been presumed to have had a prior nomination.)
- Wins: 56
- Nominations: 199

This is a list of awards and nominations received by Got7, a South Korean boy band formed by JYP Entertainment, since their debut in 2014. The group has received a total of 56 awards out of 199 nominations.

== Awards and nominations ==
Name of the award ceremony, year presented, award category, nominee(s) of the award, and result of nomination
Award ceremony	Year	Category	Nominee(s)/work(s)	Result	Ref.
Anugerah Bintang Popular Berita Harian	2019	Korean Popular Artist	Got7	Nominated	
APAN Music Awards	2020	Best Male Group	Got7	Nominated	
APAN Music Awards	2020	Best Dance Performance	Got7	Nominated	
APAN Music Awards	2020	Top 10 (Bonsang)	Got7	Won	
Asia Artist Awards	2016	Popularity Award (Singer)	Got7	Nominated	
Asia Artist Awards	2017	Popularity Award (Singer)	Got7	Nominated	
Asia Artist Awards	2018	Artist of the Year – Music	Got7	Won	
Asia Artist Awards	2018	Best Popular Award – Music	Got7	Won	
Asia Artist Awards	2019	Performance of the Year (Daesang)	Got7	Won	
Asia Artist Awards	2019	Best K-Culture Singer Award	Got7	Won	
Asia Artist Awards	2019	Star15 Popularity Award (Male Group)	Got7	Nominated	
Asia Artist Awards	2019	Favorite Group/Singer	Got7	Nominated	
Asia Artist Awards	2020	Performance of the Year (Daesang)	Got7	Won	
Asia Artist Awards	2020	Choeaedol Popularity Award (Male Group)	Got7	Nominated	
Asia Artist Awards	2022	Idolplus Popularity Award (Singer)	Got7	Nominated	
Asia Artist Awards	2023	Popularity Award (Male Singer)	Got7	Nominated	
Asian Pop Music Awards	2020	Best Male Group (Overseas)	Breath of Love: Last Piece	Nominated	
Asian Pop Music Awards	2022	Best Group (Overseas)	Got7	Nominated	
Asian Pop Music Awards	2022	Top 20 Songs of the Year (Overseas)	"Nanana"	Won	
Billboard Music Awards	2019	Top Social Artist	Got7	Nominated	
Billboard Music Awards	2020	Top Social Artist	Got7	Nominated	
Bravo Otto	2020	Best K-pop	Got7	Bronze	
Channel R Radio Awards	2020	Best Group	Got7	Nominated	
The Fact Music Awards	2020	Artist of the Year	Got7	Won	
The Fact Music Awards	2020	TMA Popularity Award	Got7	Nominated	
The Fact Music Awards	2020	U+Idol Live Popularity Award	Got7	Nominated	
The Fact Music Awards	2021	Fan N Star Choice Artist	Got7	Nominated	
The Fact Music Awards	2022	Global Fan N Star	Got7	Nominated	
The Fact Music Awards	2023	Fan N Star Choice Awards (Group)	Got7	Nominated	
Fashion Power Awards	2015	Asia Style Best Influence Group	Got7	Won	
Gaon Chart Music Awards	2015	New Artist of the Year	Got7	Nominated	
Gaon Chart Music Awards	2017	Album of the Year (1st Quarter)	Flight Log: Departure	Won	
Gaon Chart Music Awards	2017	Album of the Year (3rd Quarter)	Flight Log: Turbulence	Nominated	
Gaon Chart Music Awards	2018	Album of the Year (1st Quarter)	Flight Log: Arrival	Nominated	
Gaon Chart Music Awards	2018	Hot Performance of the Year	Got7	Won	
Gaon Chart Music Awards	2018	World Hallyu Star	Got7	Won	
Gaon Chart Music Awards	2019	Album of the Year (1st Quarter)	Eyes on You	Nominated	
Gaon Chart Music Awards	2019	Album of the Year (3rd Quarter)	Present: You	Nominated	
Gaon Chart Music Awards	2020	Album of the Year (2nd Quarter)	Spinning Top	Nominated	
Gaon Chart Music Awards	2020	Album of the Year (4th Quarter)	Call My Name	Nominated	
Gaon Chart Music Awards	2021	Album of the Year (2nd Quarter)	Dye	Nominated	
Gaon Chart Music Awards	2021	Mubeat Global Choice Award (Male)	Got7	Nominated	
Gaon Chart Music Awards	2022	Mubeat Global Choice Award (Male)	Got7	Nominated	
Genie Music Awards	2019	The Top Artist	Got7	Nominated	
Genie Music Awards	2019	The Male Group	Got7	Nominated	
Genie Music Awards	2019	The Performing Artist (Male)	Got7	Nominated	
Genie Music Awards	2019	Global Popularity Award	Got7	Nominated	
Genie Music Awards	2019	Genie Music Popularity Award	Got7	Nominated	
Golden Disc Awards	2015	Disc Bonsang	Got Love	Nominated	
Golden Disc Awards	2015	Best New Artist	Got7	Won	
Golden Disc Awards	2015	China Goodwill Star Award	Got7	Won	
Golden Disc Awards	2015	Popularity Award	Got7	Nominated	
Golden Disc Awards	2016	Disc Bonsang	Mad	Nominated	
Golden Disc Awards	2016	Popularity Award (Korea)	Got7	Nominated	
Golden Disc Awards	2016	Global Popularity Award	Got7	Nominated	
Golden Disc Awards	2017	Disc Daesang	Flight Log: Turbulence	Shortlisted	(Note: According to Golden Disc Awards criteria, winners of Disc Bonsang are automatically nominated for Disc Daesang.)
Golden Disc Awards	2017	Disc Bonsang	Flight Log: Turbulence	Won	
Golden Disc Awards	2017	Popularity Award	Got7	Nominated	
Golden Disc Awards	2017	Asian Popularity Award	Got7	Nominated	
Golden Disc Awards	2018	Disc Daesang	Flight Log: Arrival	Shortlisted	
Golden Disc Awards	2018	Disc Bonsang	Flight Log: Arrival	Won	
Golden Disc Awards	2018	Global Popularity Award	Got7	Nominated	
Golden Disc Awards	2018	Genie Music Popularity Award	Got7	Nominated	
Golden Disc Awards	2019	Disc Daesang	Eyes on You	Shortlisted	
Golden Disc Awards	2019	Disc Bonsang	Eyes on You	Won	
Golden Disc Awards	2019	Popularity Award	Got7	Nominated	
Golden Disc Awards	2019	NetEase Most Popular K-pop Star	Got7	Nominated	
Golden Disc Awards	2020	Disc Daesang	Spinning Top	Shortlisted	
Golden Disc Awards	2020	Disc Bonsang	Spinning Top	Won	
Golden Disc Awards	2020	TikTok Golden Disc Popularity Award	Got7	Nominated	
Golden Disc Awards	2020	Fan's Choice K-Pop Star	Got7	Nominated	
Golden Disc Awards	2021	Disc Daesang	Dye	Shortlisted	
Golden Disc Awards	2021	Disc Bonsang	Dye	Won	
Golden Disc Awards	2021	Curaprox Popularity Award	Got7	Nominated	
Golden Disc Awards	2021	QQ Music Popularity Award	Got7	Nominated	
Golden Disc Awards	2022	Disc Bonsang	Breath of Love: Last Piece	Nominated	
Golden Disc Awards	2022	Seezn Most Popular Artist Award	Got7	Nominated	
Hanteo Music Awards	2022	Artist of the Year	Got7	Nominated	
Hanteo Music Awards	2022	WhosFandom Award	Got7	Nominated	
iMBC Awards	2025	Best Group	Got7	Nominated	
JOOX Thailand Music Awards	2018	K-Pop Artist of the Year	Got7	Won	
JOOX Thailand Music Awards	2019	K-Pop Artist of the Year	Got7	Won	
JOOX Thailand Music Awards	2020	K-Pop Artist of the Year	Got7	Nominated	
JOOX Thailand Music Awards	2021	Top Social Artist of the Year	Got7	Won	
JOOX Thailand Music Awards	2022	Top Global Social Artist of the Year	Got7	Nominated	
KM Chart Awards	2026	Best Popular Male Group	Got7	Pending	
Korea First Brand Awards	2018	Male Idol	Got7	Won	
Line Melody Music Awards	2025	Best Inter Artist 2025	Got7	Won	
Line Melody Music Awards	2025	Black Melody of the Year	"Python"	Nominated	
Line Melody Music Chart	2025	Black Melody Award for Most Downloaded Song (January)	"Python"	Won	
Line Thailand People's Choice Awards	2020	Artist of the Year	Got7	Won	
Line Thailand People's Choice Awards	2020	Most Downloaded Official Stickers	Got7	Won	
MAMA Awards	2014	Best New Artist	Got7	Nominated	
MAMA Awards	2014	Artist of the Year	Got7	Nominated	
MAMA Awards	2015	Best Dance Performance - Male Group	"If You Do"	Nominated	
MAMA Awards	2015	UnionPay Song of the Year	"If You Do"	Nominated	
MAMA Awards	2016	Best Dance Performance - Male Group	"Hard Carry"	Nominated	
MAMA Awards	2016	Song of the Year	"Hard Carry"	Nominated	
MAMA Awards	2016	iQiYi Worldwide Favorite Artist	Got7	Won	
MAMA Awards	2017	Best Male Group	Got7	Nominated	
MAMA Awards	2017	World Performer	Got7	Won	
MAMA Awards	2017	Artist of the Year	Got7	Nominated	
MAMA Awards	2017	Favorite K-pop Star	Got7	Won	
MAMA Awards	2018	Best Male Group	Got7	Nominated	
MAMA Awards	2018	Artist of the Year	Got7	Nominated	
MAMA Awards	2018	Worldwide Fans' Choice Top 10	Got7	Won	
MAMA Awards	2018	Worldwide Icon of the Year	Got7	Nominated	(Note: Winners of Worldwide Fans' Choice Top 10 are automatically nominated for Worldwide Icon of the Year.)
MAMA Awards	2018	TikTok Most Popular Artist	Got7	Won	
MAMA Awards	2018	Favorite Male Dance Artist	Got7	Nominated	
MAMA Awards	2018	Mwave Global Fans' Choice	"Look"	Nominated	
MAMA Awards	2018	Mwave Global Fans' Choice	"Lullaby"	Nominated	
MAMA Awards	2018	Best Dance Performance - Male Group	"Lullaby"	Nominated	
MAMA Awards	2018	Song of the Year	"Lullaby"	Nominated	
MAMA Awards	2018	Best Asian Style Award	Got7	Nominated	
MAMA Awards	2019	Artist of the Year	Got7	Nominated	
MAMA Awards	2019	Best Male Group	Got7	Nominated	
MAMA Awards	2019	Worldwide Fans' Choice Top 10	Got7	Won	
MAMA Awards	2019	Worldwide Icon of the Year	Got7	Nominated	
MAMA Awards	2019	Favorite Dance Performance	"Eclipse"	Won	
MAMA Awards	2019	Song of the Year	"Eclipse"	Nominated	
MAMA Awards	2020	Best Male Group	Got7	Nominated	
MAMA Awards	2020	Artist of the Year	Got7	Nominated	
MAMA Awards	2020	Worldwide Fans' Choice Top 10	Got7	Won	
MAMA Awards	2020	Worldwide Icon of the Year	Got7	Nominated	
MAMA Awards	2022	Worldwide Fans' Choice Top 10	Got7	Won	
MAMA Awards	2022	Worldwide Icon of the Year	Got7	Nominated	
MAMA Awards	2025	Fan's Choice Male	Got7	Nominated	
MAMA Awards	2025	Visa Fan's Choice of the Year	Got7	Nominated	
MTV Europe Music Awards	2015	Best Korean Act	Got7	Nominated	
MTV Europe Music Awards	2016	Best Korean Act	Got7	Nominated	
MTV Europe Music Awards	2016	Best Worldwide Act (Korea)	Got7	Won	
NetEase Cloud Music Awards	2019	Korean Male Artist/Group of the Year	Got7	Nominated	
Philippine K-pop Awards	2014	Rookie of the Year	Got7	Won	
SBS Gayo Daejeon	2015	Chinese Netizen Popularity Award	Got7	Won	
SEED Awards	2015	Hottest Asian Artist of the Year	Got7	Won	
Seoul Music Awards	2015	New Artist Award	Got7	Won	
Seoul Music Awards	2015	Bonsang Award	Got7	Nominated	
Seoul Music Awards	2015	Popularity Award	Got7	Nominated	
Seoul Music Awards	2015	Hallyu Special Award	Got7	Nominated	
Seoul Music Awards	2016	Bonsang Award	Got7	Nominated	
Seoul Music Awards	2016	Popularity Award	Got7	Nominated	
Seoul Music Awards	2016	Hallyu Special Award	Got7	Nominated	
Seoul Music Awards	2017	Bonsang Award	Got7	Won	
Seoul Music Awards	2017	Popularity Award	Got7	Nominated	
Seoul Music Awards	2017	Hallyu Special Award	Got7	Nominated	
Seoul Music Awards	2018	Bonsang Award	Got7	Won	
Seoul Music Awards	2018	Popularity Award	Got7	Nominated	
Seoul Music Awards	2018	Hallyu Special Award	Got7	Nominated	
Seoul Music Awards	2019	Bonsang Award	Got7	Nominated	
Seoul Music Awards	2019	Popularity Award	Got7	Nominated	
Seoul Music Awards	2019	Hallyu Special Award	Got7	Nominated	
Seoul Music Awards	2020	Bonsang Award	Got7	Nominated	
Seoul Music Awards	2020	Hallyu Special Award	Got7	Nominated	
Seoul Music Awards	2020	Popularity Award	Got7	Nominated	
Seoul Music Awards	2020	QQ Music Most Popular K-Pop Artist Award	Got7	Nominated	
Seoul Music Awards	2021	Bonsang Award	Got7	Nominated	
Seoul Music Awards	2021	Popularity Award	Got7	Nominated	
Seoul Music Awards	2021	K-Wave Popular Award	Got7	Nominated	
Seoul Music Awards	2021	Legend Rookie Prize	Got7	Nominated	
Seoul Music Awards	2021	Fan PD Artist Award	Got7	Nominated	
Seoul Music Awards	2021	WhosFandom Award	Got7	Nominated	
Seoul Music Awards	2022	U+Idol Live Best Artist Award	Got7	Nominated	
Seoul Music Awards	2023	Bonsang Award	Got7	Nominated	
Seoul Music Awards	2023	Popularity Award	Got7	Nominated	
Seoul Music Awards	2023	K-Wave Popularity Award	Got7	Nominated	
Seoul Music Awards	2025	Bonsang Award	Got7	Nominated	
Seoul Music Awards	2025	Popularity Award	Got7	Nominated	
Seoul Music Awards	2025	K-Wave Special Award	Got7	Nominated	
Seoul Music Awards	2025	K-pop World Choice – Group	Got7	Nominated	
Seoul Music Awards	2026	The Best Award	Got7	Pending	
Seoul Music Awards	2026	Popularity Award	Got7	Pending	
Seoul Music Awards	2026	Korea Wave Award	Got7	Pending	
Seoul Music Awards	2026	K-pop World Choice – Group	Got7	Pending	
Soompi Awards	2018	Artist of the Year	Got7	Nominated	
Soompi Awards	2018	Best Male Group	Got7	Won	
Soompi Awards	2018	Latin America Popularity Award	Got7	Won	
Soompi Awards	2018	Twitter Best Fandom	Got7	Won	
Soribada Best K-Music Awards	2017	Bonsang Award	Got7	Nominated	
Soribada Best K-Music Awards	2017	New Hallyu Popularity Award	Got7	Nominated	
Soribada Best K-Music Awards	2018	Bonsang Award	Got7	Nominated	
Soribada Best K-Music Awards	2018	Popularity Award (Male)	Got7	Nominated	
Soribada Best K-Music Awards	2018	Global Fandom Award	Got7	Nominated	
Soribada Best K-Music Awards	2020	Bonsang Award	Got7	Nominated	
Soribada Best K-Music Awards	2020	Popularity Award (Male)	Got7	Nominated	
Soribada Best K-Music Awards	2020	New Hallyu Real Fan Award	Got7	Nominated	
Teen Choice Awards	2018	Choice International Artist	Got7	Nominated	
Telehit Awards	2019	Best K-pop of the Year	Got7	Nominated	
Thairath Online Awards	2020	Foreign Artist of the Year	Got7	Nominated	
Top Chinese Music Awards	2015	Most Promising Newcomer Award (Overseas Category)	Got7	Won	
V Live Awards	2015	V App V Star Award	Got7	Won	
V Live Awards	2017	Global V Live Top 10	Got7	Won	
V Live Awards	2018	Best Worldwide Influencer	Got7	Won	
V Live Awards	2018	Global V Live Top 10	Got7	Won	
V Live Awards	2019	Global V Live Top 10	Got7	Won	
V Live Awards	2019	Best Channel – 5 million followers	Got7	Won	
V Live Awards	2019	Global Artist Top 12	Got7	Won	
V Live Awards	2019	The Most Loved Artist	Got7	Nominated	(Note: The Most Loved Artist was selected among the 17 groups that won the main prize (V Live Global Artist Top 12 and V Live Global Rookie Top 5).)
YinYueTai V Chart Awards	2015	Best Korean Newcomer	Got7	Won	
Youku Night Awards	2015	New Asian Group Award	Got7	Won	

== Other accolades ==
=== Listicles ===
Name of publisher, year listed, name of listicle, and placement
Publisher	Year	Listicle	Placement	Ref.
Forbes	2019	Korea Power Celebrity 40	37th	
