= Not by the Moon =

"Not By The Moon"

Single by Got7

from the EP Dye
- Language: Korean
- Released: April 20, 2020
- Length: 3:25
- Label: JYP
- Composers: Park Jin-young; Jay & Rudy; Isaac Han; Aaron Kim; OKIRO
- Lyricists: Park Jin-young; Lee Seu-ran

Got7 singles chronology
"You Calling My Name" (2019)	"Not By The Moon" (2020)	"Breath" (2020)

Music video
- "Not By The Moon" on YouTube

"Not By The Moon" is a song recorded by South Korean boy group Got7 for their eleventh EP Dye. It was released by JYP Entertainment on April 20, 2020.

Professional ratings
Review scores
Source	Rating
IZM	2.5/5 stars

== Background and release ==
On April 6, the group announced the upcoming release of the extended play Dye with the lead single "Not By the Moon" by posting a trailer film and ten cinema scripts, narrated in English. On April 7, the first set of solo teaser photos of each member was released. On April 8, a second set of solo teaser photos were released featuring each member with masquerade ball masks. On April 11, the band released a group photo teaser done up in a vintage style. On April 12, 4 sets of teaser photos featuring four different sub-units were released. On April 15, the first music video teaser for the lead single "Not By the Moon" was released. A second music video teaser was released on April 16. Both "Not By The Moon" and Dye were released on April 20.

== Composition ==
"Not By The Moon" lyrics were written by Park Jin-young and Lee Seu-ran. It was composed by Park Jin-young, Jay & Rudy, Isaac Han, Aaron Kim and OKIRO. The song is composed in the key F Minor and has 152 beats per minute and a running time of 3 minutes and 25 seconds.

== Promotion ==
Got7 first performed "Not By The Moon" on Mnet's M Countdown! on April 23. KBS's Music Bank on April 23 and May 1. They also performed on SBS's Inkigayo on April 26 and May 3 as well as MBC's Show! Music Core on May 2.

== Music video ==
The music video makes references to themes of "royalty", "astronomy", "mystical motifs" and "magic" as the band clad in white perform "complex choreography". It was heavily inspired by English playwright and poet William Shakespeare's romantic tragedy Romeo and Juliet. It was directed by Hobin (A Hobin Film).

== Accolades ==
Music program awards for "Not By The Moon"
Program	Date	Ref.
Music Bank	May 1, 2020	
Show Champion	April 29, 2020	
M Countdown	April 30, 2020	

== Charts ==
Weekly chart positions
Chart (2020)	Peak position
South Korea (Gaon)	64
South Korea (Kpop Hot 100)	61
US World Digital Songs (Billboard)	5

== Release history ==
Release history for "Not By The Moon"
Region	Date	Format	Label
Various	April 20, 2020	Digital download; streaming	JYP
