= Sugar (Choi Young-jae EP) =

- Digital cover

EP by Choi Young-jae
- Released: June 21, 2022
- Genre: Rock; hip-hop; R&B
- Length: 16:04
- Language: Korean
- Label: Sublime Artist Agency

Choi Young-jae chronology
| Colors from Ars (2021) | Sugar (2022) |

Sugar is the second extended play by South Korean singer Choi Young-jae, released on June 21, 2022, through Sublime Artist Agency.

== Background and release ==
The release of Sugar was announced on June 3, 2022. Youngjae wrote the lyrics, composed and arranged all the tracks, starting from the theme of the album and then moving on to the lyrics and melodies.

Sugar, a rock and R&B EP, opens with the eponymous dance pop track, which features guitar and drums, and in which Youngjae compares an unstoppable and addictive love to sugar, switching from falsetto to deeper tones. "Focus" is pop and R&B, while "Crema" is hip hop and has a jazz atmosphere based on bossa nova rhythms.

== Track listing ==
All lyrics are written by Ars; all music is composed by Ars.

| No. | Title | Lyrics | Music | Arrangement | Length |
|---|---|---|---|---|---|
| 1. | "Sugar" | Jay & Rudy | Boytoy; Disko; Jay & Rudy; Isaac Han; Aron Kim; Ghostchild Ltd | Ars; Boytoy; Disko | 3:06 |
| 2. | "Focus" | Peter Hyun; Kinsha | Boytoy; Disko; Peter Hyun | Ars; Boytoy; Disko | 3:12 |
| 3. | "Crema" | Boytoy; Atunes | Boytoy; Atunes | Ars; Boytoy; Atunes | 3:16 |
| 4. | "Nothing" | Hahm; D'tour | Boytoy; Aron Kim; Hahm; Kay; John Thomas | Ars; Boytoy; Aron Kim; Kay | 3:26 |
| 5. | "With You" | Boytoy; TopTier; Kunyo | TopTier; Kunyo | Ars; Boytoy; Blatinum | 3:04 |
| Total length: | | | | | 16:04 |

== Charts ==
=== Weekly charts ===
Weekly chart performance for Sugar
| Chart (2022) | Peak position |
|---|---|
| South Korean Albums (Gaon) | 5 |

=== Monthly charts ===
Monthly chart performance for Sugar
| Chart (2022) | Peak position |
|---|---|
| South Korean Albums (Gaon) | 12 |
