= Trust Me =

Trust Me may refer to:

== Film and television ==
=== Film ===
- Trust Me (1989 film), an American crime film by Robert Houston
- Trust Me, a 1994 American direct-to-video crime film by Jeff Probst
- Trust Me (2007 film), a British comedy by Andrew Kazamia
- Trust Me (2010 film), a Swedish comedy-drama by Johan Kling
- Trust Me (2013 film), an American comedy-drama by Clark Gregg
- Trust Me, a 2020 film by Roko Belic

=== Television ===
==== Series ====
- Trust Me (American TV series), a 2009 drama series
- Trust Me (British TV series), a 2017–2019 anthology medical drama series
- Trust Me: The False Prophet, a 2026 American documentary miniseries

==== Episodes ====
- "Trust Me" (Alias), 2002
- "Trust Me" (The Americans), 2013
- "Trust Me" (Bates Motel), 2013
- "Trust Me" (Burn Notice), 2008
- "Trust Me" (Damages), 2009
- "Trust Me" (New Tricks), 2005
- "Trust Me" (Once Upon a Time in Wonderland), 2013

== Literature ==
- Trust Me (short story collection), a 1987 book by John Updike
- Trust Me (novel), a 2006 Indian chick lit novel by Rajashree
- Trust Me, a novel by Peter Leonard
- Trust Me: Charles Keating and the Missing Billions, a 1988 book by Charles Bowden and Michael Binstein

== Music ==
=== Albums ===
- Trust Me (Craig David album), 2007
- Trust Me (Yōko Oginome album), 1991
- Trust Me (Yugyeom album), 2024
- Trust Me, by Jean Carn, 1982
- Trust Me, an EP by Robyn and Mr. Tophat, 2017

=== Songs ===
- "Trust Me" (Akina Nakamori song), 1999
- "Trust Me" (I'm Talking song), 1984
- "Trust Me" (Pandora song), 1993
- "Trust Me", by A1 from Rediscovered, 2012
- "Trust Me", by Backstreet Boys from In a World Like This, 2013
- "Trust Me", by Bhad Bhabie featuring Ty Dolla Sign from 15, 2018
- "Trust Me", by Chris Brown from Heartbreak on a Full Moon, 2017
- "Trust Me", by Don Xhoni, 2021
- "Trust Me", by the Fray from How to Save a Life, 2005
- "Trust Me", by Guru from Guru's Jazzmatazz, Vol. 1, 1993
- "Trust Me", by Jesus Jones from Doubt, 1991
- "Trust Me", by Swans from Children of God, 1987
- "Trust Me (Midzy)", by Itzy, 2021

== Other uses ==
- Trust Me (Millais painting), an 1860–1862 painting by John Everett Millais
- Trust Me, a 2017 comedy album by Kurt Braunohler
- Experto crede, a Latin motto sometimes translated as "trust me"
