= Eclipse (Got7 song) =

Single by Got7

from the EP Spinning Top
- Language: Korean
- Released: May 20, 2019
- Length: 3:30
- Label: JYP
- Composers: Defsoul; Mirror Boy; D.ham; Munhan Mirror; Daviid Yosia; NeD; Moon Kim; Vendors
- Lyricists: Park Jin-young; Defsoul; Mirror Boy; D.ham; Munhan Mirror; Yoogeun

Got7 singles chronology
| "Miracle" (2018) | "Eclipse" (2019) | "You Calling My Name" (2019) |

Music video
- "Eclipse" on YouTube

"Eclipse" is a song recorded by South Korean boy group Got7 for their ninth EP Spinning Top. It was released by JYP Entertainment on May 20, 2019.

== Background and release ==
On April 26, 2019, JYP Entertainment announced that Got7 will have a comeback with an EP at the end of May. On May 14, JYP Entertainment first released the track list for the EP in which "Eclipse" was revealed to be the title track.

== Composition ==
"Eclipse" lyrics were written by Park Jin-young, Got7 member Jay B, Mirror Boy, D.ham, Munhan Mirror and Yoogeun and composed by Jay B, Mirror Boy, D.ham, Munhan Mirror, Daviid Yosia, NeD, Moon Kim and Vendors. "Eclipse" sees the participation of Jay B both in the lyrics and in the composition, and expresses the anxiety of not potentially being able to protect loved ones, and at the same time the fear of making them feel oppressed and end up alienating them. The song is composed in the key C-sharp Major and has 160 beats per minute and a running time of 3 minutes and 30 seconds.

== Promotion ==
Got7 held their first comeback stage for "Eclipse" on Mnet's M Countdown on May 23, 2019, KBS's Music Bank on May 24 and performed on SBS's Inkigayo on May 26.

== Accolades ==
Music program awards for "Eclipse"
| Program | Date | Ref. |
|---|---|---|
| Inkigayo | June 2, 2019 | |
| M Countdown | May 30, 2019 | |
| Music Bank | May 31, 2019 | |

== Charts ==
Weekly chart positions
| Chart (2019) | Peak position |
|---|---|
| Japan (Japan Hot 100) | 84 |
| South Korea (Gaon) | 65 |
| South Korea (Kpop Hot 100) | 3 |
| US World Digital Songs (Billboard) | 13 |

== Release history ==
Release history for "Eclipse"
| Region | Date | Format | Label |
|---|---|---|---|
| Various | May 20, 2019 | Digital download; streaming | JYP |
