= Do It (Choi Young-jae album) =

- Digital cover

Studio album by Choi Young-jae
- Released: November 6, 2023
- Genre: K-pop
- Length: 32:49
- Language: Korean
- Label: Sublime

Singles from Do It
- 1. "Errr Day" Released: March 12, 2023

Do It is the first studio album by South Korean singer Choi Young-jae, released on November 6, 2023, through Sublime.

== Background and release ==
The release of Do It was announced on October 16, 2023. The album was conceived with the intention of giving hope and encouraging people to pursue their dreams and goals, while the title track expresses the excitement of a man in love. Choi Young-jae participated in the production, under the pseudonym Ars, writing the lyrics for all songs and the music for nine out of ten tracks. "Flower," already performed in 2019 in Bangkok during the Got7 Fan Fest Seven Secrets, is a synth-pop song and "Dreaming Again" is R&B. "Problem" talks about dealing with complicated emotions, while "Fluffy" expresses the singer's affection for his dog, Coco. The album closes with a ballad dedicated to fans. Among the songs, "Errr Day" had already been released as a single on March 12, 2023.

== Track listing ==
All lyrics are written by Ars.

No.	Title	Lyrics	Music	Arrangement	Length
1.	"Flower"	Joo Chan-yang (Pollen), Lavin	Joo Chan-yang (Pollen), Lavin, Ars	Joo Chan-yang (Pollen), Lavin	3:17
2.	"Do It"	Bullseye (Avec), Ley (Avec)	Ars, Boytoy, Bullseye (Avec), Ley (Avec), Disko	Disko	3:09
3.	"Deal"	Brother Su, Paprikaa, Jonghan	Ars, Brother Su, Paprikaa, Jonghan, Boytoy, Junsoo, Showwer	Junsoo, Showwer	3:30
4.	"Dreaming Again"	Noday	Ars, Noday, Versa Choi	Versa Choi, Noday	2:42
5.	"Problem"	Bullseye (Avec), Ondine (Avec)	Ars, Boytoy, Bullseye (Avec), Flip_00, 37	Flip_00, 37	3:28
6.	"Errr Day"	Boytoy, Junsoo, Oat	Boytoy, Disko, Junsoo, Oat, Dez	Ars, Boytoy, Disko	3:24
7.	"Fluffy"	Brother Su	Ars, Brother Su	Ars, Brother Su	2:51
8.	"Snooze"	Brother Su	Hollin (MonoTree)	Hollin (MonoTree)	3:16
9.	"Thinking of You" (자꾸 네가)		Ars, Boytoy, Aron Kim, Mojo (Plz)	Aron Kim, Haevn, Gr0ommit (Plz), Mojo (Plz)	3:51
10.	"Never Leave You Alone"		Ars, Boytoy, Disko	Disko	3:21
Total length:					32:49

== Charts ==
Do it debuted at #23 on the Circle Weekly Album Chart of the November 5–11 week, selling 9,098 copies in both the standard and Nemo versions. The next week it rose to #13.

=== Weekly charts ===
Weekly chart performance for Do It
Chart (2023)	Peak position
South Korean Albums (Circle)	13

=== Monthly charts ===
Monthly chart performance for Do It
Chart (2023)	Peak position
South Korean Albums (Circle)	47
