= Focus (Jus2 EP) =

EP by Jus2
- Released: March 5, 2019
- Recorded: 2018–2019
- Genre: R&B; alternative R&B; deep house
- Length: 20:52
- Language: Korean; English
- Label: JYP

Singles from Focus
- 1. "Focus on Me" Released: March 05, 2019

Focus is the Korean debut extended play by the South Korean duo Jus2. It was released by JYP Entertainment on March 5, 2019 with "Focus On Me" serving as the album's lead single. The Japanese version was released on April 10, 2019.

== Track listing ==
Credits adapted from Naver Music.

No.	Title	Lyrics	Music	Arrangement	Length
1.	"Focus On Me"	Defsoul; Yugyeom	Defsoul; Yugyeom; Cosmic Boy; OLNL	Cosmic Boy; Park Jin-young	3:36
2.	"Drunk On You"	Defsoul; Moon Hanmiru; John Napoleon; Keith Hetrick; Nate Gott	Defsoul; Moon Hanmiru; Keith Hetrick	Keith Hetrick	3:46
3.	"Touch"	Defsoul	Defsoul; Christian Fast; Marcus Lindberg; Tania Doko; Royal Dive	Royal Dive	3:20
4.	"Senses"	Defsoul; Moon Hanmiru; Deepshower	Defsoul; Moon Hanmiru; Deepshower	Deepshower	3:15
5.	"Love Talk"	Yugyeom; FRANTS	Yugyeom; EFFN; FRANTS	FRANTS	3:53
6.	"Long Black"	Yugyeom; Karla Maria Vel	RE:ONE; Yugyeom; EFFN	RE:ONE	3:03
Total length:					20:52

== Charts ==
=== Album ===
==== Weekly charts ====
Chart (2019)	Peak position
Japanese Albums (Oricon)	7
South Korean Albums (Gaon)	2
US World Albums (Billboard)	6

=== Single ===
==== "Focus On Me" Weekly charts ====
Chart (2019)	Peak position
South Korea (Hot 100)	45
US World Digital Songs (Billboard)	23

== Sales ==
Chart	Sales
South Korea (Gaon Chart)	89,107

== Release history ==
Region	Date	Format	Label
Various	March 5, 2019	Digital download, streaming	JYP Entertainment
South Korea	March 6, 2019	CD	JYP Entertainment
