= You Calling My Name =

Single by Got7

from the EP Call My Name
- Language: Korean
- Released: November 4, 2019
- Length: 3:14
- Label: JYP
- Composers: Louis Schoorl; Marco Borrero; Benjamin Ingrosso; David Brook; Mag
- Lyricists: Park Jin-young; Defsoul; Lee Seu-ran; Kass

Got7 singles chronology
"Eclipse" (2019)	"You Calling My Name" (2019)	"Not by the Moon" (2020)

Music video
- "You Calling My Name" on YouTube

"You Calling My Name" is a song recorded by South Korean boy group Got7 for their tenth EP Call My Name. It was released by JYP Entertainment on November 4, 2019.

== Background and release ==
JYP Entertainment first announced a new music release for the group in South Korea on October 18, 2019, and, after seven short films, revealed the title of the record and the release date on October 24. "You Calling My Name", was released on November 4, 2019, and was introduced to the public through a showcase on the same day.

== Composition ==
"You Calling My Name" lyrics were written by Park Jin-young, Defsoul, Lee Seu-ran and Kass. It was composed by Louis Schoorl, Marco Borrero, Benjamin Ingrosso, David Brook and Mag. "You Calling My Name", genres are funk and R&B, it contains the message "you, who called my name while I was trapped in the dark, have become the reason for my existence". The song is dedicated to fans and, expressing thanks and apologies to them. The song is composed in the key C Minor and has 111 beats per minute and a running time of 3 minutes and 14 seconds.

== Promotion ==
Got7 held their first comeback stage for "You Calling My Name" on Mnet's M Countdown on November 7, 2019, they also performed on MBC's Show! Music Core on November 9. And on SBS's Inkigayo on November 10 and November 17.

== Accolades ==
Music program awards for "You Calling My Name"
Program	Date	Ref.
Music Bank	November 15, 2019	

== Publication lists ==
Publication lists for "You Calling My Name"
Critic/Publication	List	Rank	Ref.
Billboard	The 25 Best K-pop Songs of 2019	6	

== Charts ==
Weekly chart positions
Chart (2019)	Peak position
South Korea (Gaon)	98
South Korea (Kpop Hot 100)	63
US World Digital Songs (Billboard)	3

== Release history ==
Release history for "You Calling My Name"
Region	Date	Format	Label
Various	November 4, 2019	Digital download; streaming	JYP
