= Interlunar (Yugyeom album) =

- Digital cover

Studio album by Yugyeom
- Released: June 17, 2025
- Genres: R&B; EDM; trap
- Length: 29:00
- Languages: Korean; English
- Label: AOMG

Yugyeom chronology
Trust Me (2024)	Interlunar (2025)

Singles from Interlunar
- 1. "Shall We Dance" Released: June 17, 2025

Interlunar is the second studio album by South Korean singer Yugyeom, released on June 17, 2025, through AOMG.

== Background and release ==
Interlunar is Yugyeom's last album before his military enlistment; the title refers to the time span between the new moon and the full moon, when the satellite is not visible in the sky, and refers to the singer's upcoming hiatus. The message of the album is that you should not be afraid or sad about not seeing your loved ones because you will meet again.

The album, initially conceived as a six-track extended play, is mainly EDM, while "Unconditional" is R&B and "Set Me Free" is trap. The singer worked on the lyrics of "Shall We Dance" on the plane and on the lyrics of "Mine" in a hotel room while he was on tour.

== Critical reception ==
For Heo Mi-so of Topstarnews, the album showcases Yugyeom's musical growth with emotional melodies and a sound that "reveals unprecedented effort put into the composition," and concluded that the singer, through his signature introspection, embraced fleeting darkness as a piece of his inner self.

== Track listing ==
No.	Title	Lyrics	Music	Arrangement	Length
1.	"It's Okay"	Yugyeom	Yugyeom, ZODIACISYOURSIGN	ZODIACISYOURSIGN	3:02
2.	"Glue Stick (딱풀)" (featuring Hoody)	Yugyeom, Robb Roy, Vernon	Yugyeom, DJ Wegun, Robb Roy, Vernon	DJ Wegun	3:14
3.	"Shall We Dance"	Yugyeom, LSV, THAMA	LSV, THAMA, Choi Nakta, Go Seowon	LSV, Choi Nakta, Go Seowon	3:31
4.	"You Call My Name"	Yugyeom	Code Kunst, Ryan Shin (153/Joombas)	Code Kunst	2:59
5.	"Scenario"	Cocona	L-like, Cocona	L-like	2:00
6.	"Interlunar"	Yugyeom, Hwang Aram	Numbernine, Robb Roy, NICOLKEEM	Numbernine, NICOLKEEM	2:41
7.	"Mine" (featuring Kirin)	Yugyeom, Kirin	Yugyeom, Kirin, Bronze, ELO, Robb Roy	Bronze	2:57
8.	"Set Me Free" (featuring Gaeko)	Yugyeom, Tone Stith, Gaeko, Rian Beriones	Yugyeom, Tone Stith, DJ Wegun, Gaeko, Rian Beriones, Kosmic	DJ Wegun	3:11
9.	"Unconditional"	Tone Stith, Rian Beriones	DJ Wegun, Tone Stith, Rian Beriones, Kosmic	DJ Wegun	3:01
10.	"Sweet Like (album ver.)"	Robb Roy, Vernon	Numbernine, Robb Roy	Numbernine, NICOLKEEM	2:24
Total length:					29:00

== Charts ==
=== Weekly charts ===
Weekly chart performance for Interlunar
Chart (2025)	Peak position
South Korean Albums (Circle)	11

=== Monthly charts ===
Monthly chart performance for Interlunar
Chart (2025)	Peak position
South Korean Albums (Circle)	38
