= Yugyeom =

South Korean singer (born 1997)

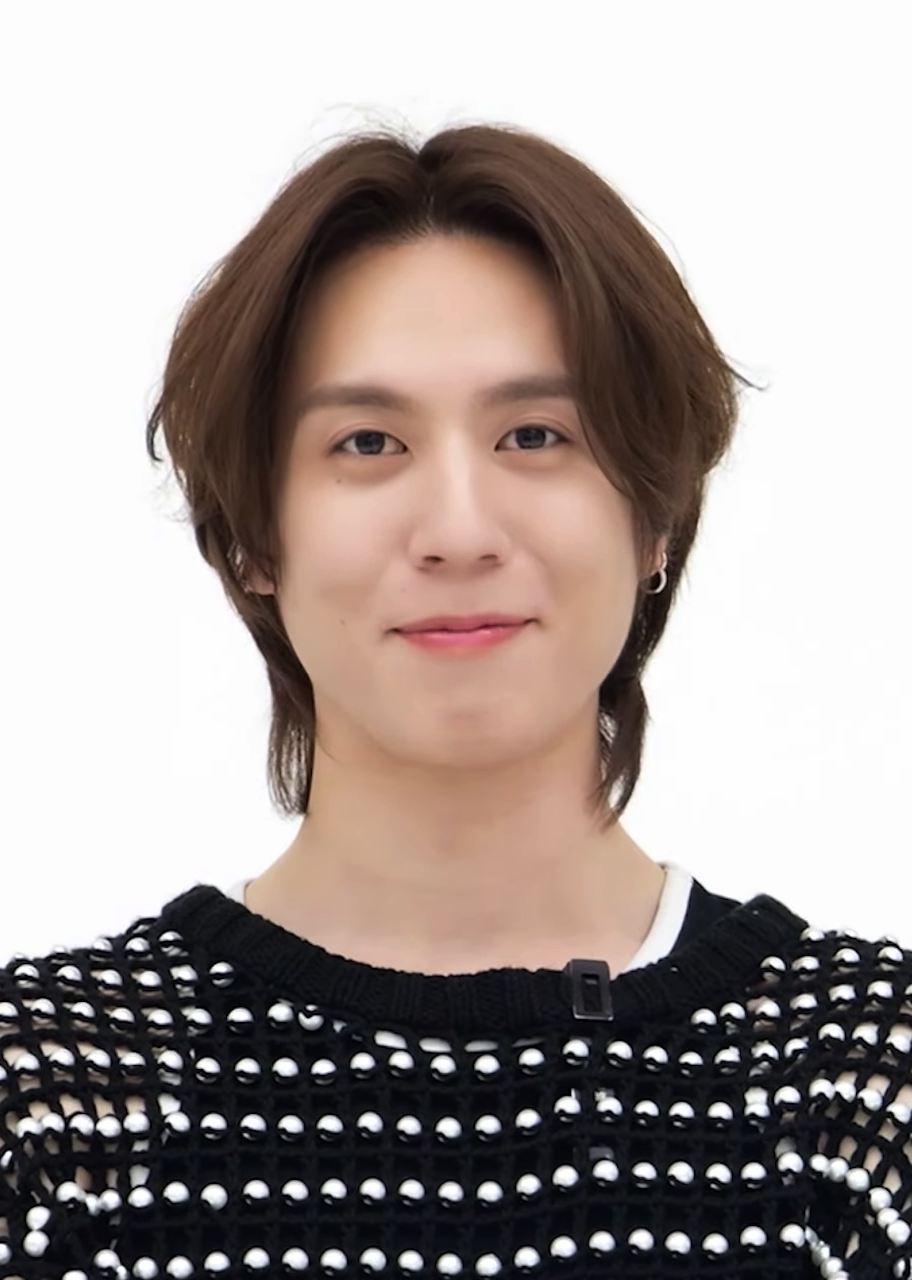
- Yugyeom in June 2024
- Born: Kim Yu-gyeom; November 17, 1997 (age 28); Seoul, South Korea
- Education: Daekyeung University
- Occupations: Singer; songwriter; dancer
- Musical career
- Genres: K-pop; R&B
- Years active: 2014–present
- Labels: JYP; AOMG
- Member of: Got7; Jus2
- Website: Official website

Korean name
- Hangul: 김유겸
- RR: Gim Yugyeom
- MR: Kim Yugyŏm

Signature
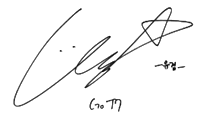

Kim Yu-gyeom (Korean: 김유겸; born November 17, 1997), known mononymously as Yugyeom (Korean: 유겸), is a South Korean singer-songwriter and dancer who made his debut as a member of the South Korean boy band Got7 in 2014 and the subunit Jus2.

== Early life ==
Yugyeom was born in Seoul and has spent a little of his childhood in Saudi Arabia due to his father's job. He lived in Yeosu from age 6 to 11, then moved to Namyangju, Gyeonggi Province, where he grew up alongside his older brother.

While in Yeosu, he attended trumpet, bass and guitar lessons; however, he was especially interested in dance, and started performing for his classmates during lunch breaks in his second year of primary school. He started dreaming of becoming a singer and a dancer watching performances of Big Bang and J.Y. Park when he was little, and, after his family moved to Yeosu, Yugyeom joined the school talent show, where he performed a choreography. From there, he actively took part in these events, and, for two years, learnt choreographies on his own by copying them from TV.

While attending the first year of middle school, he took part in the Hidden Performing Arts Tournament, where he danced to Beast's "Shock". His older brother filmed the performance and posted it to Cyworld, where the footage caught the attention of Yugyeom's cousin, a dance teacher, who invited him to join the private dance school where she worked. After learning freestyle dance, he joined the Body & Soul crew at age 13, entering underground dance competitions: with them, in 2010, he won second place at the national competition Adrenaline House Dance Battle. A teacher at the dance school he was attending was a dance instructor for JYP Entertainment, and this led him to an audition for the label. He became a trainee in 2011, during his eighth year of school.

== Career ==
=== 2013–2020: Debut and solo activities ===
Trained under JYP Entertainment, he appeared on the 2013 Mnet reality-survival program WIN: Who Is Next, where he competed against YG Entertainment trainees, who later debuted as Winner and iKon members.

On January 16, 2014, Yugyeom debuted with K-pop boy group Got7 releasing the EP Got It?. In 2015, JYP Entertainment in partnership with Youku Tudou, released a mini web drama series titled Dream Knight featuring the Got7 members. Over the years, Yugyeom also took part in creating choreographies for "If You Do" from their EP Mad, and for "Poison" from their EP Dye.

In 2016, he participated in Mnet's Hit the Stage, a dance survival show which sees idols from different K-pop groups team up with professional dance teams and compete with others, appearing in episodes 9 and 10. He ranked second in episode 9 and won first place during the final. The same year, Yugyeom began taking part in writing and composing Got7's songs, debuting as a songwriter with "See The Light" (빛이나) for their Flight Log: Departure album. Yugyeom also co-hosted The Show on April 5 and The Show SBS Super Concert in Busan on October 18.

In April 2018, together with fellow member Jay B, he participated in the art collaboration project "Collaboran" for carbonated mineral water brand Perrier with American multimedia artist Ben Jones. The art collaboration was unveiled at a launching event on April 22, at Nakwon Musical Instrument Arcade. With Got7's third full-length studio album Present: You, Yugyeom released his solo song "Fine". The accompanying music video was disclosed on September 12. In February 2019, he joined the SBS reality show Law of The Jungle in Northern Mariana Islands for four episodes. On March 5, he debuted as one half of the K-pop duo Jus2 alongside Jay B, with the mini album Focus.

In May 2020, he appeared on MBC's singing competition show King of Mask Singer as "Mr. Raspberry Wine", on episode 257.

=== 2021–present: Departure from JYPE and solo debut ===
In January 2021, Yugyeom, along with the other group members, parted ways with JYP Entertainment though remaining as Got7. On February 19 it was announced that he had officially signed an exclusive contract with AOMG. A video of the singer dancing to "Franchise" by Travis Scott featuring Young Thug and M.I.A. was released on YouTube with the announcement.

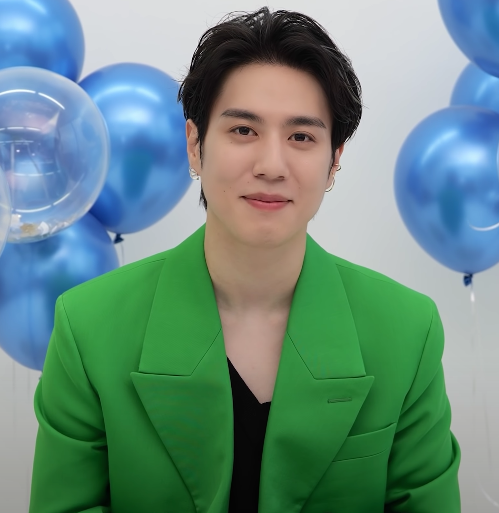
Yugyeom in June 2021.

On June 11, Yugyeom released "I Want U Around" featuring DeVita. The single served as a pre-release of the 7-track extended play Point of View: U, for which he collaborated with hip-hop artists DeVita, Loco, Gray, Jay Park and Punchnello. The EP, which was released on June 17, saw Gray produce five songs and Cha Cha Malone two. A music video for "All Your Fault" was also released on the same day.

On June 22, 2021, Yugyeom made his debut on the Billboard World Digital Song Sales Chart at number two with "I Want U Around". Two days later, the EP debuted on the Gaon Album Chart at number 11 and "All Your Fault" on the Gaon Download Chart at number 15.

In August, he performed at We All Are One, a cheering concert for the Tokyo Olympics, and at AOMG first online concert Above Ordinary 2021.

On March 31, 2022, Yugyeom released the digital single "Take You Down" featuring Coogie. From May 5 to May 13, he embarked in a solo tour through Europe, performing in Berlin, Munich, Oberhausen, Paris and London, and selling out tickets for Munich and Oberhausen. He held a solo concert in Manila on August 19, debuting the unreleased track "Always Ready", and performed two sold-out shows at Impact Exhibition Hall 5 in Bangkok on August 27 and 28.

On January 2, 2023, he released the digital single "Ponytail", followed by the single album LOLO on July 24. In November 2023 he held a five-stop tour in Europe.

On February 21, 2024, Yugyeom released his first studio album, Trust Me. From October to December he toured South Asia and Australia with the Trusty tour, while the North and Latin American legs of the tour took place between March and April 2025.

In June 2025 he released his second studio album Interlunar prior to his enlistment in the army band on September 29 to fulfill the military mandatory service.

== Personal life ==
=== Education ===
In February 2016, he graduated from Hanlim Multi Art School.

=== Philanthropy ===
In June 2020, Yugyeom donated an undisclosed amount to the Black Lives Matter Fund in light of the protests for George Floyd's murder. In June 2023, he donated ₩14 million to We Act, a non-profit animal rescue organization in Namyangju. In April 2025, he donated ₩20 million to Save the Children and to help those affected by the 2025 Myanmar earthquake.

=== Military service ===
In August 2025, AOMG announced that Yugyeom had been accepted by the Military Manpower Administration as a specialist recruit for his mandatory military service. He enlisted for active duty service in the Republic of Korea Army (ROKA) on September 29, 2025. After completing basic military training, he began serving in an Army military band.

== Discography ==
=== Studio albums ===
Title	Details	Peak chart positions	Sales
Title	Details	KOR	Sales
Trust Me	Released: February 21, 2024; Label: AOMG; Formats: CD, digital download, streaming	10	KOR: 20,429
Interlunar	Released: June 17, 2025; Label: AOMG; Formats: CD, digital download, streaming	11	KOR: 22,400

=== Extended plays ===
Title	Details	Peak chart positions	Sales
Title	Details	KOR	Sales
Point of View: U	Released: June 17, 2021; Label: AOMG; Formats: CD, digital download, streaming	8	KOR: 43,906

=== Single albums ===
Title	Details
Take You Down	Released: March 31, 2022; Label: AOMG; Formats: digital download, streaming; Tracklist: 1. "Take You Down" (feat. Coogie); 2. "Lights" (불빛)
LOLO	Released: July 24, 2023; Label: AOMG; Formats: digital download, streaming; Tracklist: 1. "LOLO"; 2. "Say Nothing" (feat. Lee Hi)

=== Singles ===
Title	Year	Peak chart positions		Album
Title	Year	KOR	US World	Album
"All Your Fault"(네 잘못이야) (feat. Gray)	2021	— (Note: "All Your Fault" did not enter the Gaon Digital Chart, but peaked at no. 15 on the Gaon Download Chart.)	18	Point of View: U
"Take You Down" (feat. Coogie)	2022	— (Note: "Take You Down" did not enter the Gaon Digital Chart, but peaked at no. 19 on the Gaon Download Chart.)	—	Take You Down
"OOOWEE" (F.Hero feat. Yugyeom and Twopee)	2022	—	—	Non-album single
"Ponytail" (feat. Sik-K)	2023	—	—	Trust Me
"LOLO"	2023	—	—	Trust Me
"La Sol Mi"	2024	— (Note: "La Sol Mi" did not enter the Circle Digital Chart, but peaked at no. 42 on the Circle Download Chart.)	—	Trust Me
"1 Minute" (1분만)	2024	180	—	Trust Me
"Sweet Like"	2024	—	—	Non-album single
"Shall We Dance"	2025	—	—	Interlunar
"Interlunar"	2025	—	—	Interlunar
"—" denotes releases that did not chart.

=== Other releases ===
Title	Year	Album
"The Way You Are" (그대로)	2017	Non-commercial singles (Note: Released on SoundCloud's profile yugyeom17 (deleted in February 2021).)
"You Know"	2017	Non-commercial singles
"No Way" (feat. G2)	2017	Non-commercial singles
"I Don't Know" (feat. Reddy)	2017	Non-commercial singles
"A Little Bit More" (조금만 더)	2019	Non-commercial singles
"You"	2019	Non-commercial singles
"To Me" (나에게)	2020	Non-commercial singles
"Used To Blame" (원망했던)	2020	Non-commercial singles
"Don't Think" (생각없이)	2020	Non-commercial singles
"MYOB" (신경 꺼)	2020	Non-commercial singles
"I Can Do It, You Can Do It"	2020	Non-commercial singles

=== Songwriting credits ===
All song credits are adapted from the Korea Music Copyright Association's database, unless otherwise noted.

Year	Artist	Title	Album	Lyrics		Music	
Year	Artist	Title	Album	Credited	With	Credited	With
2016	Got7	"See the Light" (빛이나)	Flight Log: Departure	Yes	Mark Tuan, Frants, BamBam	Yes	Mark, Frants
2016	JYP Nation	"Encore"	Non-album single	Yes	J.Y. Park "The Asiansoul", Armadillo, Kim Seung-soo, Mark, Jackson Wang	No	—N/a
2016	Got7	"No Jam" (노잼)	Flight Log: Turbulence	Yes	Mark, Frants, BamBam, Jackson Wang	Yes	Mark, Frants
2016	Got7	"Let Me Know"	Hey Yah	Yes	Frants, Amon Hayashi, Natsumi Kobayashi	Yes	Frants
2017	Got7	"Don't Care" (양심없이)	Flight Log: Arrival	Yes	—N/a	Yes	mo'l
2017	Got7	"To Me" (내게)	7 for 7	Yes	—N/a	Yes	Effn
2017	Got7	"97 Young & Rich"	Turn Up	Yes	BamBam, Frants, Simon	Yes	BamBam, Frants
2018	Got7	"Us" (우리)	Eyes on You	Yes	Samuel Ku	Yes	Effn
2018	Got7	"2 (Two)"	The New Era	Yes	Jinyoung, Distract, Mark, Secret Weapon, Samuelle Soung	Yes	Jinyoung, Distract, Mark, Secret Weapon
2018	Got7	"No One Else"	Present: You	Yes	Effn, Room102	Yes	Effn, Room102
2018	Got7	"Fine"	Present: You	Yes	—N/a	Yes	Effn
2018	Got7	"WOLO"	Present: You & Me	Yes	Jackson Wang, BamBam	No	—N/a
2018	Got7	"From Now" (이젠)	Present: You & Me	Yes	—N/a	Yes	Effn
2018	Got7	"Phoenix"	Present: You & Me	Yes	Jackson Wang	Yes	Jackson Wang, Boytoy
2019	Got7	"25"	I Won't Let You Go	Yes	Jinyoung, Distract, Cosho	Yes	Jinyoung, Distract, Secret Weapon
2019	Jus2	"Focus on Me"	Focus	Yes	Defsoul (JayB)	Yes	Defsoul (Jay B), Cosmix Boy, OLNL
2019	Jus2	"Love Talk"	Focus	Yes	—N/a	Yes	Effn, Frants
2019	Jus2	"Long Black"	Focus	Yes	Veljkovic Karla Maria, Re:One	Yes	Effn, Yoo Jeffrey
2019	Jus2	"Breath" (吐息)	Focus (Japan Edition)	Yes	Defsoul (Jay B)	No	—N/a
2019	Got7	"1°"	Spinning Top: Between Security and Insecurity	Yes	Kass	No	—N/a
2019	Got7	"Crash and Burn"	Call My Name	Yes	Kass, Selah, Isran, Eniac	No	—N/a
2020	Got7	"Poison"	Dye	No	—N/a	Yes	Davey Nate, A-Dee
2020	Got7	"Thank You, Sorry" (이젠 내가 할게)	Breath of Love: Last Piece	Yes	Nathan	Yes	Nathan
2021	Yugyeom	"I Want U Around" (feat. DeVita)	Point of View: U	Yes	Gray, DeVita	Yes	Gray, DeVita
2021	Yugyeom	"Running Through The Rain"	Point of View: U	Yes	Gray	Yes	Gray, Dax, Perro
2021	Yugyeom	"All Your Fault" (Feat. Gray)	Point of View: U	Yes	Gray	Yes	Gray
2021	Yugyeom	"All About U" (Feat. Loco)	Point of View: U	Yes	Gray, Loco	Yes	Gray
2021	Yugyeom	"Love The Way" (Feat. Jay Park, Punchnello)	Point of View: U	Yes	Jay Park, Punchnello	Yes	Jay Park, Cha Cha Malone
2021	Yugyeom	"Falling In Love"	Point of View: U	Yes	—N/a	Yes	Adrian McKinnon, Jo Micheal, Cha Cha Malone
2021	Yugyeom	"When U Fall"	Point of View: U	Yes	Gray	Yes	Gray
2022	Yugyeom	"Take You Down" (Feat. Coogie)	Take You Down	Yes	Woogie, Coogie	Yes	Woogie, Coogie
2022	Yugyeom	"Lights"	Take You Down	Yes	—N/a	Yes	DJ Wegun
2022	Got7	"Two"	Got7	Yes	Distract	Yes	Distract, Dr.Ahn
2022	Got7	"Don't Care About Me"	Got7	Yes	Jinyoung	Yes	Distract, Jinyoung, Ludwig Lindell
2023	Yugyeom	"Ponytail" (feat. Sik-K)	Trust Me	Yes	Gray, Sik-K	Yes	Gray, Sik-K
2023	Yugyeom	"Say Nothing" (feat. Lee Hi)	Trust Me	Yes	Lee Hi, Gray	Yes	Lee Hi, Gray, Dax
2024	Yugyeom	"Shine" (빛이나) (feat. Sumin)	Trust Me	Yes	Sumin	No	—N/a
2024	Yugyeom	"Be Alright" (feat. Punchnello)	Trust Me	Yes	Gray, Punchnello	Yes	Gray, Dax, Punchnello
2024	Yugyeom	"1 Minute" (1분만)	Trust Me	Yes	—N/a	Yes	Gray
2024	Yugyeom	"Steppin"	Trust Me	Yes	Gray, Ryu Han-young, DeVita	Yes	Gray, Dax, Ryu Han-young, DeVita
2024	Yugyeom	"She" (나의 그녀는)	Trust Me	Yes	Gray	Yes	Gray, Dax, Choi Joon
2024	Yugyeom	"WUH"	Trust Me	Yes	Gray	Yes	Gray, Dax, Min
2024	Yugyeom	"Dance"	Trust Me	Yes	Woogie, Ryu Han-young	Yes	Woogie, Ryu Han-young
2024	Yugyeom	"Take It Slow" (허리를 감싸고)	Trust Me	Yes	Gray	Yes	Gray, Dax, Trevor
2024	Yugyeom	"Wooyayaya" (우야야야)	Trust Me	Yes	Hwang A-ram	Yes	NoiseMasterMinsu, Tez_Toy of SMGS, Mortal of SMGS, Daall
2025	Got7	"Remember" (기억할거야)	Winter Heptagon	Yes	—N/a	Yes	Mortal, 4bout, Noisemasterminsu
2025	Got7	"Yours Truly", (우리가할수있는말은.)	Winter Heptagon	Yes	Got7	No	—N/a

== Filmography ==
=== Dramas ===
Year	Title	Role	Note
2015	Dream Knight	Yugyeom	Korean-Chinese webseries by JYPE and Youku Tudou

=== Television shows ===
Year	Title	Role	Note	Ref.
2013	WIN: Who Is Next	Contestant	Rap and dance battle (Episode 4)	
2016	Hit the Stage	Contestant	finished in 1st place (Episodes 9–10)	
2019	Law of the Jungle	Cast member	in Northern Mariana Islands (Episode 349–352)	
2020	King of Mask Singer	Contestant	as Raspberry Wine (Episode 257)	
2024-25	Universe League	Director	in Team Beat	

=== Radio presenting ===
Year	Title	Role	Notes	Ref.
2018	Lee Hong-ki's Kiss The Radio	Special host	with Youngjae (March 5–6)	
2020	Idol Radio	Special host	with Jay B (Episode 571, April 26)	
2024	Got7 Youngjae's Best Friend	Special host	May 6–10	

== Videography ==
=== Music videos ===
Year	Title	Artist	Director	Notes	Ref.
2018	"Fine"	Yugyeom	Naive Creative Production	Solo song from Got7's album Present: You	
2021	"I Want U Around" (feat. DeVita)	Yugyeom (featuring DeVita)	HQF (Highqualityfish)		
2021	"All Your Fault" (feat. Gray)	Yugyeom (featuring Gray)	Yongsoo Kwon (Saccharin Film)		
2022	"Take You Down" (feat. Coogie)	Yugyeom (featuring Coogie)			
2022	"OOOWEE"	F.Hero feat. Yugyeom and Twopee	Directornet		
2023	"Ponytail"	Yugyeom (featuring Sik-K)			
2023	"LOLO"	Yugyeom			
2024	"La Sol Mi"	Yugyeom			
2024	"1 Minute" (1분만)	Yugyeom	Novv Kim		
2024	"Sweet Like"	Yugyeom			
2025	"Shall We Dance"	Yugyeom			
2025	"Interlunar"	Yugyeom			

== Awards and nominations ==
Award	Year	Category	Nominated work	Result	Ref.
Asia Artist Awards	2021	Popularity Award – Male Solo Singer	Yugyeom	Nominated	
Asia Artist Awards	2021	U+Idol Live Popularity Award – Male Solo Singer	Yugyeom	Nominated	
KM Chart Awards	2026	Best Popular Solo Male Award	Yugyeom	Nominated	
