= Jus2 =

South Korean musical duo

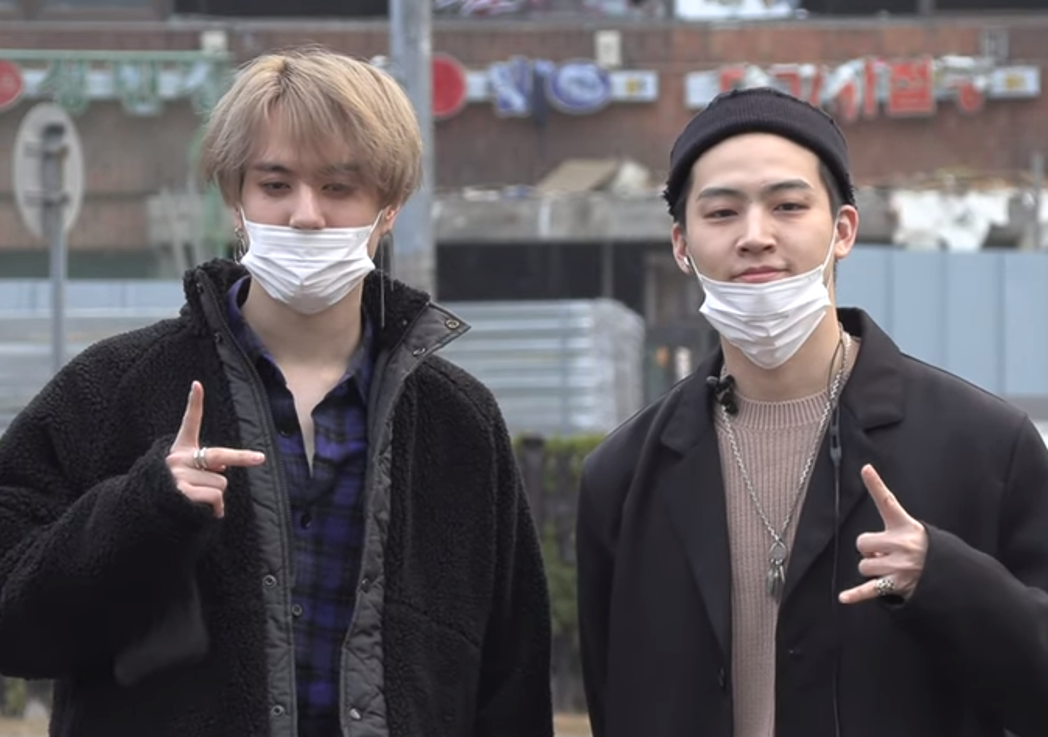
- Jus2 in March 2019; From left to right: Yugyeom and Jay B.

Background information
- Origin: Seoul, South Korea
- Genres: K-pop; R&B; alternative R&B
- Years active: 2019
- Label: JYP
- Members: Jay B; Yugyeom

Jus2 (Korean: 저스투) is a South Korean duo consisting of Jay B and Yugyeom. They were formed by JYP Entertainment and released their first EP, Focus, on March 5, 2019. It is the second Got7 sub-unit, after JJ Project.

== Name ==
The duo's name is "a combination of the words just and two" according to member Yugyeom.

== History ==
On February 13, 2019, JYP Entertainment announced the formation of a new Got7 unit which would debut sometime in March. It was later revealed that their debut EP, Focus, would be released on March 5 and would contain six tracks with "Focus On Me" as the title track. The music video for the lead song was released on March 3. The duo held their debut stage on Mnet's M Countdown on March 7, 2019. Focus debuted at number 6 on Billboard World Album Chart.

They released an OST for He is Psychometric, called "Take".

On January 19, 2021, following the expiration of their contract, they left JYP Entertainment.

== Discography ==
=== Extended plays ===
List of extended plays, with selected chart positions and sales
Title	Album details	Peak chart positions			Sales
Title	Album details	KOR	JPN	US World	Sales
Focus	Released: March 5, 2019; Label: JYP Entertainment; Formats: CD, digital download, streaming audio	2	7	6	KOR: 85,461; JPN: 14,788; US: 1,000

=== Singles ===
List of singles, with selected chart positions, showing year released and album name
Title	Year	Peak chart positions			Album
Title	Year	KOR Down.	KOR Hot	US World	Album
"Focus On Me"	2019	103	45	23	Focus

=== Soundtrack appearances ===
Title	Year	Peak chart positions	Album
Title	Year	US World	Album
"Take"	2019	25	He Is Psychometric OST

== Tours and concerts ==
- Jus2 <FOCUS> Live Premiere with V Live
- Jus2 <FOCUS> Premiere Showcase Tour

=== Tour dates ===
Date	City	Country	Venue	Attendance
April 4, 2019	Macau	China	Broadway Theatre	—N/a
April 10, 2019	Tokyo	Japan	Zepp Divercity	—N/a
April 11, 2019	Tokyo	Japan	Zepp Divercity	—N/a
April 14, 2019	Taipei	Taiwan	Taipei International Convention Center	—N/a
April 17, 2019	Osaka	Japan	Zepp Namba	—N/a
April 18, 2019	Osaka	Japan	Zepp Namba	—N/a
April 21, 2019	Jakarta	Indonesia	Nusantara Hall, ICE BSD	—N/a
April 26, 2019	Bangkok	Thailand	Thunder Dome	—N/a
April 27, 2019	Bangkok	Thailand	Thunder Dome	—N/a
April 28, 2019	Bangkok	Thailand	Thunder Dome	—N/a
May 4, 2019	Singapore		Zepp Bigbox	—N/a

== Filmography ==
=== Variety shows ===
Year	Title	TV Network	Ref.
2019	Jus2 Moments	YouTube, V Live	
2019	Jus2 Tourgraph	YouTube, V Live	

=== Music videos ===
Year	Title	Director(s)	Ref.
2019	"Focus On Me"	Dirextor Kim (HQF)	

== See also ==
- Got7 discography
- List of awards and nominations received by Got7
