= Call My Name (EP) =

- Digital cover

EP by Got7
- Released: November 4, 2019
- Studios: JYPE Studios; The Vibe Studio; U Productions Studio A
- Genre: K-pop
- Length: 21:00
- Language: Korean
- Labels: JYP; Dreamus
- Producer: J.Y. Park "The Asiansoul"

Got7 chronology
Love Loop (2019)	Call My Name (2019)	Dye (2020)

Singles from Call My Name
- 1. "You Calling My Name" Released: November 4, 2019

Call My Name is the tenth extended play by South Korean boy band Got7. It was released through JYP Entertainment on November 4, 2019. It features the lead single "You Calling My Name".

== Background ==
Following the conclusion of Got7's Keep Spinning World Tour, JYP Entertainment announced a new music release for the group in South Korea on October 18, 2019, and, after seven short films, revealed the title of the record and the release date on October 24. The track list was disclosed on October 30. Call My Name, together with the music video of title track "You Calling My Name", was released on November 4, 2019, and was introduced to the public through a showcase on the same day.

The record, which Got7 worked on during the Keep Spinning World Tour, ideally serves as a continuation of their previous Korean EP, Spinning Top: while in the latter the group expressed their insecurities, Call My Name tells how hearing the fans call "Got7" calmed their anxiety and led the septet to find its true value by realizing that it can shine on stage. Call My Name has the concept of name (名) as its main theme, and talks about "how, if you don't call my name, I have no reason to exist".

The character for "name" from the oracle bone script is shown in the music video for "You Calling My Name".

The title track "You Calling My Name" sees Got7 adopting a sexy and sorrowful concept for the first time. The lyrics are penned by J.Y. Park and JB, who is also behind "Pray" e "Thursday"; Jinyoung and Yugyeom co-wrote "Run Away" and "Crash & Burn", respectively.

"You Calling My Name", whose genres are funk and R&B, contains the message "you, who called my name while I was trapped in the dark, have become the reason for my existence". The song is dedicated to fans and, expressing thanks and apologies to them, contains the emotions felt during the Keep Spinning World Tour by hearing their cheers.

We put what we learned during the concert into "You Calling My Name". When many fans call our name, I realized that we are Got7. There is still a lot we can show. We've grown a notch, and I think this song was born because of that. We have found the reason for our anxiety, and the reason why we don't feel anxious.

— JB, TenAsia

With "Pray" the group tells the fan it prays for them and that they are its strength. "Thursday" compares the relationship with another person to Thursday, an ambiguous day as, being mid-week, it is neither a weekday nor part of the weekend, and which is therefore used to describe a vague and uncertain relationship. "Run Away" is about wanting to escape the city to go to a better place, while "Crash & Burn" has an energy similar to "Hard Carry".

== Critical reception ==
The Kraze Magazine defined "You Calling My Name" as "a perfect example of how mature [Got7] have become in sound and style. No longer are they the young boys that are chasing after girls in school, but are grown men going through the motions of deep relationships and heartbreak".

At the end of 2019, "You Calling My Name" ranked sixth in Billboard's "25 Best K-pop Songs of 2019" list, which described it as "captivating and impactful" and noted how it matched the group, making use of each individual members' strengths.

== Commercial success ==
Call My Name topped Gaon Weekly Album Chart in South Korea upon release, and was second in the Monthly Chart with 298,052 copies sold. In January 2020 it was certified platinum. It was the 19th best selling album of 2019 in South Korea with 298,361 copies sold.

In the US, it debuted at number 5 on the Billboard World Albums Chart with 1,000 copies sold, and at number 8 on the Heatseekers Albums Chart.

== Track listing ==
No.	Title	Lyrics	Music	Arrangement	Length
1.	"You Calling My Name" (니가 부르는 나의 이름)	J.Y. Park "The Asiansoul"; Lee Seu-ran; Kass; Defsoul	Louis Schoorl; Marco Borrero; Benjamin Ingrosso; David Brook	Louis Schoorl; Mag	3:14
2.	"Pray"	Defsoul; iHwak; Jomalxne	Defsoul; iHwak; Jomalxne; Zayson; RoseInPeace	Zayson; RoseInPeace	3:47
3.	"Now or Never" (featuring Jonas Blue)	Kass	Guy Robin; Ed Drewett; Danielle Eliza Owen	Guy Robin	3:05
4.	"Thursday"	Defsoul; iHwak; Royal Dive	Defsoul; iHwak; Royal Dive	Royal Dive	3:26
5.	"Run Away"	Vendors; Jinyoung; Ryu Da-som	Christian Fast; Henrik Nordenback; Jimmy Claeson	Henrik Nordenback	4:04
6.	"Crash & Burn"	Earattack; Kass; Yugyeom; Selah; Lee Seu-ran; Eniac	Earattack; Christoffer Semelius	Earattack; Christoffer Semelius	3:24
Total length:					21:00

== Charts ==
=== Weekly charts ===
Chart (2019)	Peak position
Australian Digital Albums (ARIA)	17
Japanese Albums (Oricon)	16
South Korean Albums (Gaon)	1
US Heatseekers Albums (Billboard)	8
US World Albums (Billboard)	5

=== Year-end charts ===
Chart (2019)	Position
South Korean Albums (Gaon)	19

== Accolades ==
Awards
Year	Organization	Award	Nominated Work	Result	Ref.
2020	Asia Artist Awards	Performance of the Year	You Calling My Name	Won	

Music program awards
Song	Program	Network	Date	Ref.
"You Calling My Name"	Music Bank	KBS	November 15, 2019	
