= Trust Me (Yugyeom album) =

- Digital cover

Studio album by Yugyeom
- Released: February 21, 2024
- Genre: R&B; hip-hop; pop; dance music
- Length: 43:20
- Language: Korean
- Label: AOMG

Yugyeom chronology
Trust Me (2024)	Interlunar (2025)

Singles from Trust Me
- 1. "Ponytail" Released: January 2, 2023; 2. "LOLO" Released: July 24, 2023; 3. "Say Nothing" Released: July 24, 2023; 4. "La Sol Mi" Released: January 31, 2024

Trust Me is the first studio album by South Korean singer Yugyeom, released on February 21, 2024, through AOMG.

== Background and release ==
The release of Trust Me was announced on January 16, 2024, on the tenth anniversary of Got7's debut. The single "La Sol Mi" was released early on January 31, 2024, along with a music video, while the album was released on February 21.

Of the 14 songs, "Shine" tells the story of a couple finding light in the presence of their loved one, while "WUH" explores themes of desire and physical intimacy.

== Critical reception ==
According to Suwitcha Chaiyong of Bangkok Post, "Trust Me surprises listeners with his soothing and melodious vocals. In addition to his fascinating singing skills, the album showcases his talents in writing and composing music. Overall, the album is meticulously crafted, with every track showcasing beautiful melodies and catchy hooks."

The album ranked fifth and thirteenth on Billboard's lists of the best K-pop albums of the first half of 2024 and the entire year: Jeff Benjamin called it a complete and cohesive project that shows Yugyeom's evolution as an artist, "blending R&B and hip-hop influences with smooth vocals and introspective lyrics."

== Track listing ==
No.	Title	Lyrics	Music	Arrangement	Length
1.	"La Sol Mi"	Chancellor, Knave	Chancellor, Knave, yeol, viewhorse, Dohy, Shintaro Yasuda	Shintaro Yasuda, Chancellor	2:52
2.	"Shine (빛이나)" (featuring Sumin)	Yugyeom, Sumin	DJ Wegun, Sumin	DJ Wegun	3:42
3.	"Be Alright" (featuring Punchnello)	Yugyeom, Gray, Punchnello	Yugyeom, Gray, Dax, Punchnello	Gray, Dax	3:12
4.	"1 Minute (1분만)"	Gray	Yugyeom, Gray, Dax, Verybetter	Gray, Dax	2:46
5.	"Steppin"	Yugyeom, Gray, DeVita, Hanyoung Ryou	Yugyeom, Gray, Dax, Deun Ji, Hanyoung Ryou	Gray, Dax, Deun Ji	3:08
6.	"She (나의 그녀는)"	Yugyeom, Gray	Yugyeom, Gray, Dax, Distract	Gray, Dax	3:25
7.	"LOLO"	Bryn, Skinny Brown, noisemasterminsu, About, Rhody	Jumal of SMGS, noisemasterminsu, Bryn, About	Jumal of SMGS, noisemasterminsu	2:23
8.	"WUH"	Yugyeom, Gray	Yugyeom, Gray, Dax, min	Gray, Dax, min	3:06
9.	"Ponytail" (featuring Sik-K)	Yugyeom, Gray, Sik-K	Yugyeom, Gray, Sik-K, Dax	Gray, Dax	3:25
10.	"Dance"	Yugyeom, Hanyoung Ryou, Woogie	Yugyeom, Hanyoung Ryou, Woogie	Woogie, Hanyoung Ryou	2:31
11.	"Take It Slow (허리를 감싸고)"	Yugyeom, Gray	Yugyeom, Gray, Dax, Trevor	Gray, Dax, Trevor	3:13
12.	"Say Nothing" (featuring Lee Hi)	Yugyeom, Gray	Yugyeom, Gray, Dax	Gray, Dax	3:29
13.	"Wooyayaya (우야야야)"	Yugyeom, Hwang A-rang	Yugyeom, Smugglers, Tez_Toy of SMGS, Mortal of SMGS, daall	Tez_Toy of SMGS, noisemasterminsu, ov	3:15
14.	"Summer Blues"	Chancellor, Knave	Chancellor, Knave, yeol, viewhorse, Dohy, Shintaro Yasuda	Shintaro Yasuda, Chancellor	2:53
Total length:					43:20

== Charts ==
=== Weekly charts ===
Weekly chart performance for Trust Me
Chart (2024)	Peak position
South Korean Albums (Circle)	10

=== Monthly charts ===
Monthly chart performance for Trust Me
Chart (2024)	Peak position
South Korean Albums (Circle)	33
