= Colors from Ars =

- Digital cover

EP by Youngjae
- Released: October 5, 2021
- Recorded: 2021
- Genres: R&B; pop; hip hop
- Length: 24:32
- Language: Korean
- Label: Sublime Artist Agency

Youngjae chronology
Colors from Ars (2021)	Sugar (2022)

Singles from Colors from Ars
- 1. "Vibin" Released: October 5, 2021

Colors from Ars is the first extended play by South Korean singer Youngjae. Released on October 5, 2021, the self-produced, self-composed record was inspired by the singer's daily life, his emotions and his fans, and ranges from R&B to hip hop. Commercially, it debuted at No. 6 on the Gaon Weekly Album Chart in South Korea, selling 77,138 copies in the month of release, while music critics praised Youngjae's vocal skills and his musical versatility, comparing Colors from Ars to a "vibrant palette."

== Background and release ==
On September 17, 2021, Youngjae released a teaser video announcing his solo debut with his first mini album, Colors from Ars. The title recalls the rainbow, also suggested by the seven tracks of the record, while "Ars", from the Latin "Ars longa, vita brevis", is the pseudonym Youngjae has been using as a composer and lyricist since 2016. Colors from Ars sees the singer producing, composing and writing lyrics for all the songs.

The extended play was released both digitally and physically on October 5 along with the music video of the title track "Vibin". It was inspired by the singer's daily life, his emotions and his fans, and it took five months to complete it.

Colors from Ars opens with "Beautiful", a warm, upbeat and laid-back song which is a tribute to "a beautiful girl in this beautiful world," followed by the R&B-city pop love song "Tasty". "Vibin" is a dance pop song with a house beat which tells of the inability to stop falling in love with a person, and contains the message "Enjoy this moment, what you are feeling now." After the first three tracks, the album deviates towards cooler tones and sweeter melodies that tell stories of sentimentality and vulnerability. "Roses" expresses excitement towards a loved one and a blossoming love, while "Eternal" is a sentimental pop ballad accompanied by piano and guitar in which the singer mourns the fast passing of time and wishes to spend eternity with those he loves. "Moonlight" is R&B and hip hop, and conveys sympathy and comfort.

The seventh and final track is "Lonely", which was first revealed to the public on April 1, 2021 through a performance and interview posted on Elle Korea's YouTube channel. It is an R&B and hip hop song containing a message of consolation and empathy, and an invitation to accept yourself as you are. The singer has used the loneliness and emptiness felt in his heart while returning home after a busy day, and the difficulty of showing himself to the world, expressing these feelings with the line "My room is sinking in the deep ocean" (Korean: 깊은 바닷속으로 내 방이 전부 가라앉네; RR: Gipeun badatsogeuro nae bangi jeonbu garaanne); the final verse "My heart is completely filled with the light of the green ocean" (초록빛 바다색으로 내 맘이 전부 채워지네; Chorokbit badasaegeuro nae mami jeonbu chaewojine) is, on the other hand, a reference to the fans of Youngjae's boy band, Got7, whose official color is green, and expresses how loneliness can be overcome by relying on people close to you.

== Promotions ==
Youngjae presented Colors from Ars and performed "Vibin", "Tasty" and "Eternal" during an online showcase aired on October 5 on V Live. He then promoted the title track "Vibin" on M! Countdown, Music Bank, Show! Music Core and Inkigayo from October 7 to October 10.

== Critical reception ==
Professional ratings
Review scores
Source	Rating
NME	4/5 stars

Rolling Stone India described "Vibin" as "a distinct soundscape". Writing for Soundigest, Amanda Thilo chose "Moonlight" and "Roses" as the stand-out tracks because, with their string arrangements, "they stand as excellent examples of Youngjae's vocal skills. [...] He has a natural, airy quality to his voice, which on tracks like these, are transcendent and pull at the heartstrings," concluding that the touches of lofi, strings, and electronic beats mixed to the general pop vibe of the album, enhanced the tracks. For Bollywood Hungama's Nandini Iyengar "Colors from Ars is a colorful presentation of music and lyrics for emotions like love, loss, and hope," with which the singer proved his musical versatility in a "vibrant palette". This comparison was used by NME, too, who gave the record 4 out of 5 stars, and praised Youngjae's emotional depth and range, commenting that the approach of molding songs around his voice, with band or piano-driven melodies dominating much of the record, allowed his vocal spectrum to stand out.

== Track listing ==
No.	Title	Lyrics	Music	Arrangement	Length
1.	"Beautiful"	Ars; Boytoy; Kuro (Blatinum)	Ars; Boytoy; Disko (Blatinum); Kuro (Blatinum)	Ars; Boytoy; Disko (Blatinum)	3:01
2.	"Tasty"	Ars; Boytoy; Peter Hyun (Blatinum); Young Sky (Blatinum); Houdini	Ars; Boytoy; Peter Hyun (Blatinum)	Ars; Boytoy; Peter Hyun (Blatinum)	3:01
3.	"Vibin"	Ars; Boytoy; ADN; WD; Young Sky (Blatinum); Peter Hyun (Blatinum)	Ars; Boytoy; Disko (Blatinum); ADN; WD	Ars; Boytoy; Disko (Blatinum)	3:22
4.	"Roses"	Ars; Boytoy; Young Sky (Blatinum); Peter Hyun (Blatinum)	Ars; Boytoy; Young Sky (Blatinum); Peter Hyun (Blatinum)	Ars; Boytoy; Young Sky (Blatinum); Peter Hyun (Blatinum)	3:22
5.	"Eternal"	Ars	Ars; Boytoy; Jay & Rudy; Aaron Kim; Isaac Han; Kial	Ars; Boytoy; Aaron Kim; Isaac Han; Kial	3:53
6.	"Moonlight"	Ars; Boytoy; Houdini	Ars; Boytoy; Aaron Kim; Isaac Han; Houdini	Ars; Boytoy; Aaron Kim; Isaac Han	4:09
7.	"Lonely"	Ars; Noday	Ars; Noday	Ars; Noday	3:44
Total length:					24:32

== Charts ==
Chart performance for Colors from Ars
Chart (2021)	Peak position
South Korean Albums (Gaon)	6
