= Dye (EP) =

- Digital cover

EP by Got7
- Released: April 20, 2020
- Genres: K-pop; synth-pop; trap; house; reggaeton; jazz; pop
- Length: 19:49 (Digital download); 30:20 (Physical edition)
- Labels: JYP; Dreamus
- Producers: J.Y. Park The AsianSoul; DEFSOUL; Lavin; Mirror Boy; Moon Han Miru; OKIRO; Isaac Han; Aaron Kim; BLSSD; Keith Hetrick; Appu Krishnan; A-Dee; Zayson; Royal Dive; NODAY; FRANTS; Secret Weapon

Got7 chronology
Call My Name (2019)	Dye (2020)	Breath of Love: Last Piece (2020)

Singles from Dye
- 1. "Not by the Moon" Released: April 20, 2020

Dye (stylized in all caps) is the eleventh extended play (EP) by South Korean boy band Got7. It was released digitally and physically on April 20, 2020 by JYP Entertainment and distributed by Dreamus. It contains six songs, including the lead single "Not by the Moon", and four bonus tracks. It follows their previous EP Call My Name (2019). Musically, the EP incorporates various genres and styles including synth-pop, trap, reggaeton, house, jazz and pop.

Commercially, the album debuted atop South Korea's Gaon Album Chart and has sold more than 460,000 copies. It also entered the Billboard World Albums Chart at number four. Got7 promoted the album with live performances on various music shows.

== Background and release ==
On April 2, 2020, it was reported that Got7 was preparing for a comeback in late April or early May and the exact date was yet to be finalized. On April 6, the group announced the upcoming release of extended play Dye with lead single "Not by the Moon" by posting a trailer film and ten cinema scripts, narrated in English. On April 7, the first set of solo teaser photos of each member was released. On April 8, a second set of solo teaser photos were released featuring each member with masquerade ball masks. On April 11, the band released a group photo teaser done up in a vintage style. On April 12, 4 sets of teaser photos featuring four different sub-units were released. The full album tracklist was released on April 13. On April 14, the band released lyrics teasers of songs from the EP. On April 15, the first music video teaser for the lead single "Not by the Moon" was released. A second music video teaser was released on April 16. On April 17, an album spoiler preview was released featuring some highlights of the album songs. On April 18, the band posted "monograph" teaser videos of the album. A few hours prior to the album release, JYP released behind-the-scenes of jacket shooting. The album was released on April 20, 2020, in both CD and digital formats. An accompanying music video for the lead single "Not by the Moon" was released in conjunction with the release of the album. The video makes references to themes of "royalty", "astronomy", "mystical motifs" and "magic" as the band clad in white perform "complex choreography". It was heavily inspired by English playwright and poet William Shakespeare's romantic tragedy Romeo and Juliet.

== Composition ==
Dye consists of six songs while the physical version contains four additional bonus tracks. The EP's title is a pun on the word "dye" which refers to both colour and death as they relate to "eternal love". According to Got7, the album "epitomizes a permanent pledge of love" that sonically follows their 2019 EP Call My Name "but is more mournful and powerful." The album opens with the "dreamy" number "Aura" written by Young-jae. The lead single, "Not by the Moon" is a trap and synth-pop song, produced and written by JYP Entertainment's CEO Park Jin-young (J.Y. Park), with the collaboration with renowned songwriter duo Jakob Mihoubi and Rudy Daouk. It sets a darker tone for the EP and incorporates a "heaviness" in its production. It also features high tones and harmonies. "Love You Better" is a jazz and pop song with a synth-pop chorus and was written by Got7's Jin-young. "Crazy" is built on future bass and contains an "addictive" melody written by JB. It features "high-synth smatterings" over "hard-hitting bass drum pattern." "Trust My Love" is a hybrid of reggaeton and house with elements of R&B for which "intense" drum beats and EDM bass provide minimalist instrumentation. "Poison" features an actual whistle and was written by Yugyeom. The last four tracks "Ride", "Gravity", "God Has Return + Mañana" and "JY&YG Dance" were performed by the band on the 2019 Keep Spinning World Tour and are only available on the CD version of the album.

== Promotion ==
On April 25, 2020, Got7 held an online showcase which was broadcast live via Naver's V Live app. They performed "Aura", "Not by the Moon", "Love You Better" and "Poison" for the first time at the showcase. The showcase was a success, reaching 1.77 million concurrent viewers worldwide. The group then promoted the album with a series of live performances on various music shows, starting with Mnet's M Countdown! on April 23. The group also promoted the songs on KBS's Music Bank, MBC's Show! Music Core and SBS 's Inkigayo. In the second week of promotion, "Not by the Moon" won first place at MBC Music's Show Champion on April 29. This was followed by wins on M Countdown! and Music Bank. The group also appeared as guests on the April 30 episode of SBS Power FM Radio Show to discuss their album.

== Critical reception ==
Chris Gillett of South China Morning Post gave the album a positive review, praising the diverse musical styles explored in the EP which makes it "compelling". He wrote: "Whether it’s the brash synth-bass parts, the dense synth layers, or their undeniably silky hooks that weave their way in between the music, each component creates its own journey, without pulling away from the song’s nature."

== Commercial performance ==
The album debuted atop the Gaon Album Chart, selling 280,000 physical copies in its first week. Additionally, it topped the monthly Gaon Chart for the month of April selling 339,737 copies. It also debuted at number 4 on the US World Albums chart and at number 9 on the US.Heatseekers Albums chart. It entered the US Independent Albums at number 45 for the week ending May 2 and charted at number 49 on the UK Album Downloads Chart for the week ending April 30.The album also achieved no 1 in iTunes in 50 countries.

== Track listing ==
Credits adapted from Naver Music.

Digital download
No.	Title	Lyrics	Music	Arrangement	Length
1.	"Aura"	Ju Chan-yang; Young-jae (Got7); NiiHWA	Ju Chan-yang; Young-jae (Got7); NiiHWA; Lavin	Lavin	3:06
2.	"Crazy"	DEFSOUL (Got7); Mirror Boy; D.Ham; Moon Han Miru	DEFSOUL (Got7); Mirror Boy; Moon Han Miru	DEFSOUL (Got7); Mirror Boy; Moon Han Miru	3:51
3.	"Not by the Moon"	J.Y. Park The Asiansoul; Lee Seu-ran	J.Y. Park The Asiansoul; Jay & Rudy; Isaac Han; Aaron Kim; OKIRO	J.Y. Park The Asiansoul; OKIRO; Isaac Han; Aaron Kim	3:24
4.	"Love You Better"	Jin-young (Got7); Jo Mi-yang; room102	Frederik Jyll; BLSSD	BLSSD	3:21
5.	"Trust My Love"	B-Rock; 10YEARS	Davey Nate; Keith Hetrick; APPU KRISHNAN	Keith Hetrick; APPU KRISHNAN	3:12
6.	"Poison"	Mos-mal	Yu-gyeom (Got7); Davey Nate; A-Dee	A-Dee	2:55
Total length:					19:49

CD Only (Bonus tracks)
No.	Title	Lyrics	Music	Arrangement	Length
7.	"Ride"	DEFSOUL (Got7)	DEFSOUL (Got7); Zayson; iHwak; Royal Dive	Zayson; Royal Dive	1:52
8.	"Gravity"	Young-jae (Got7); NODAY	Young-jae (Got7); NODAY	NODAY	1:40
9.	"God Has Return + Mañana"	Jackson (Got7); Mark (Got7); BamBam (Got7)	BamBam (Got7); FRANTS	FRANTS	4:10
10.	"JY&YG Dance"			FRANTS; Secret Weapon	2:49
Total length:					30:20

== Charts ==
Chart (2020)	Peak position
Belgian Albums (Ultratop Flanders)	192
Japanese Albums (Oricon)	20
Japan Hot Albums (Billboard)	72
South Korean Album (Gaon)	1
Swiss Albums (Schweizer Hitparade)	94
UK Album Downloads Chart (OCC)	49
US Heatseekers Albums (Billboard)	9
US Independent Albums (Billboard)	45
US World Albums (Billboard)	4

== Certifications ==
Certifications for Dye
Region	Certification	Certified units/sales
South Korea (KMCA)	Platinum	250,000^{^}
^{^} Shipments figures based on certification alone.

== Awards and nominations ==
=== Music program awards ===
Song	Program	Date	Ref.
"Not by the Moon"	Show Champion (MBC Music)	April 29, 2020	
"Not by the Moon"	M Countdown (Mnet)	April 30, 2020	
"Not by the Moon"	Music Bank (KBS)	May 1, 2020	

== Release history ==
Region	Date	Format	Distributor	Ref.
Various	April 20, 2020	Digital download	JYP Entertainment	
South Korea	April 20, 2020	Digital download	JYP Entertainment	
South Korea	April 20, 2020	CD	JYP Entertainment; Dreamus	

== See also ==
- List of Gaon Album Chart number ones of 2020
