= Spinning Top (EP) =

Spinning Top: Between Security & Insecurity

EP by Got7
- Released: May 20, 2019
- Genre: K-pop
- Length: 20:44
- Language: Korean
- Labels: JYP; Dreamus

Got7 chronology
Present: You & Me (2018)	Spinning Top: Between Security & Insecurity (2019)	Love Loop (2019)

Singles from Spinning Top
- 1. "Eclipse" Released: May 20, 2019

Spinning Top is the ninth extended play by the South Korean boy band Got7. It was released by JYP Entertainment and Dreamus on May 20, 2019. It peaked at No. 1 on the Gaon Album chart, and No. 5 on the US World Albums chart. It sold 314,948 units in South Korea at the end of 2019, becoming the 18th best selling album of the year, and was certified platinum by KMCA on July 11, 2019. The group followed it up with a world tour from June 15, 2019, visiting 16 cities in Asia, North America, Europe, Latin America and Oceania.

== Background and release ==
On April 26, 2019, JYP Entertainment announced that Got7 would release an album on May 20. From May 6 to May 13, the label revealed group and individual teaser photos with four different concepts: colorful, black and red, blurry and black and white, and portraits. The album's online cover was revealed on May 13 and the track list was released the following day, "Eclipse" being the album's title track. Two teasers for the music video were released on May 15 and 16, followed by an album spoiler and the lyrics of each song.

== Composition ==
Anxiety for the future. As the goal is large, the expectations are high, and there's anxiety that it may return to disappointment. We got to see the light through "Fly" activities, and that's how happiness and anxiety came at the same time. It's an emotion that started with the question "when these times or good times will disappear, and when we have to admit and accept them later, will we be able to fully accept them?" [...] I can't help but worry about the future. As musicians, we'll continue to do music, but as we get older and a new trend comes, the public will find it and we will be pushed out. Thinking about those things, I came up with the message and concept for this album.

— JB on Got7's source of anxiety and the concept of the album, Media SR

Evaluating ideas to use as the theme of the new album, the word "anxiety" was chosen and, collecting other people's stories, Got7 decided to make an album to help them overcome it. Reflecting on a way to reach the goal, and re-reading his old diaries, JB had the idea of using the symbol of a top, discovering that, even with the passage of time, he had cyclically worried about the same things and had repeatedly gone through periods of anxiety, staying still in the same spot like a top that can't get out of captivity. The toy that rotates in balance was then associated to security and light, while the moment when it tilts and falls was associated to insecurity and darkness. In addition to memories and experiences taken from JB's diaries, another source of inspiration was the opposition between the darkness backstage before a concert and the light of fans' lightsticks during the performance on stage.

The group took part in composing and writing the lyrics of all the tracks, reflecting on previous releases and expressing both "the universal theme of both security and insecurity within oneself", communicating the message to overcome anxiety and move forward heading towards the light, and the pressure experienced over its career in relation to the results of its musical production, and the anxiety towards an uncertain future and of losing what had been achieved up to that moment: on Got7's personal level, it is an invite to overcome the regret and anxiety felt when expectations towards an album are not met.

Overall, Spinning Top follows the process of a mind starting to get anxious, reaching the peak and finally finding a sense of stability. The disc consists of six tracks, which become seven in the physical edition with the instrumental rendition of "Eclipse", and is divided into two halves. The first three tracks represent the moment when darkness falls and anxiety sets in: "1°", whose lyrics were partly written by Yugyeom, compares the inclination of even one degree of the top, which leads it to an extreme destabilization, to how getting caught up in a minimum of insecurity does nothing but make it bigger and bigger. The future bass track "Eclipse" sees the participation of JB both in the lyrics and in the composition, and expresses the anxiety of not potentially being able to protect loved ones, and at the same time the fear of making them feel oppressed and end up alienating them. On a personal level, it raises questions about the group's future, capturing the anxiety felt "in the brightest moment" thinking of when popularity and love will disappear. To make the first version of the song, JB took two to three months; "Eclipse" was initially "harsher and full of catchy melodies", but the score underwent numerous revisions following producer J.Y. Park's instructions, given his demand for more melodic and lyrical parts. On Park's advice, part of the lyrics were also modified to change the way the feelings were expressed. The eclipse was chosen for the title as a metaphor, because the process by which insecurity comes and fills a person is gradual, similar to the sun covering the moon. The third song is "The End", written and co-composed by Jinyoung thinking about what could have made him feel more insecure, namely the end of the group, and talks about the anxiety and sadness one experiences at the end of a relationship. As the end of something represents, at the same time, a new beginning, "The End" marks the turning point on the record, introducing the next three tracks, which narrate the return of the light.

"Time Out" asks the listener to take a break and get rid of negative thoughts, focusing on overcoming insecurity, and was co-written and co-composed by Youngjae. On the other hand, BamBam participated in the composition and the lyrics of "Believe", in which he invites someone to trust him again and support him, so that he can find the light, similar to how a top, once it has fallen, needs someone who throws it again to resume spinning. The sixth and final song, "Page", was co-composed and written by JB after reading a diary entry from a few years earlier in which he talked about the people he cared about. The song expresses his desire to get in touch with many people and continue to write beautiful stories in the diary, and contains the theme of trusting each other and going together hand in hand towards the future.

The album cover is divided into two halves: the upper one represents security and is white, with a standing spinning top; the toy is reflected in the lower half, where it is instead tilted and on a black background, representing the insecurity and darkness that comes when the top is tilted by one degree.

== Promotions ==
Got7 held a "Comeback Live Talk" on Naver's V Live broadcasting site on May 20, 2019, at 21:00 KST, one hour following the release of the album, to introduce each track. Actor Kim Sang-joong featured as a guest. They also promoted the album on May 21 on JTBC's Idol Room.

Got7 held their comeback stage on Mnet's M Countdown on May 23 and promoted "Eclipse" on several music programs in South Korea, including Music Bank, Show! Music Core and Inkigayo.

== Critical reception ==
Soundigest called the album "an emotional roller-coaster as the septet open up more than ever about their vulnerabilities and confidence within themselves," and an "EP [that] definitely didn't disappoint" "when it came to the universal theme of both security and insecurity within oneself" retaining "that signature Got7 production and sound." Vulture Hound's Amber Denwood wrote that the group is "a powerful machine" and has "all angles covered," and that "this level of talent and work-ethic has never been as evident as it is in the 6 tracks of their latest release, Spinning Top." She indicated "1°" as the song that showcases the vocal line's talent and "Eclipse" as the one that gives the rappers their time to shine, and called "Time Out" "a track that proves that Got7 are more than just their lyrics."

== Commercial performance ==
Spinning Top peaked at No. 1 on the Gaon Album chart, and No. 5 on the US World Albums chart. It sold more than 210,000 copies in the first week, and was certified platinum by KMCA on July 11, 2019. The music video for "Eclipse" surpassed 20 million views on YouTube around 79 hours after release.

The record was nominated Best Album of the 2nd Quarter of 2019 at the Gaon Chart Music Awards and Album Daesang at the 34th Golden Disc Awards, where it won the Album Bonsang award. At the end of 2019, it sold 314,948 units in South Korea, becoming the 18th best selling album of the year.

== Track listing ==
Adapted from the group's official website.

No.	Title	Lyrics	Music	Arrangement	Length
1.	"1°"	Yugyeom; Kass	NiiHwa; MosPick; Kwon Deok-geun	MosPick; Kwon Deok-geun	3:16
2.	"Eclipse"	J.Y. Park "The Asiansoul"; Defsoul; Mirror Boy; D.ham; Munhan Mirror	Defsoul; Mirror Boy; D.ham; Munhan Mirror; Daviid; Yosia; NeD; Moon Kim; Vendors	Mirror Boy; D.ham; Munhan Mirror	3:30
3.	"The End" (끝)	Jinyoung	Jinyoung; Distract; Secret Weapon	Secret Weapon	4:05
4.	"Time Out"	Ars; Noday; Versa Choi	Ars; Noday; Versa Choi	Versa Choi; Noday	3:04
5.	"Believe" (믿어줄래)	BamBam; Tommy Park	BamBam; Frants	Frants	3:05
6.	"Page"	Defsoul; Jomalxne; iHwak; Royal Dive	Defsoul; iHwak; Jomalxne; Royal Dive	Royal Dive	3:44
Total length:					20:44

Physical edition
No.	Title	Music	Arrangement	Length
7.	"Eclipse" (Instrumental)	Defsoul; Mirror Boy; D.ham; Munhan Mirror; Daviid; Yosia; NeD; Moon Kim; Vendors	Mirror Boy; D.ham; Munhan Mirror	3:30
Total length:				24:14

== Charts ==
=== Weekly charts ===
Chart (2019)	Peak position
Australian Digital Albums (ARIA)	32
Japanese Albums (Oricon)	13
South Korean Albums (Gaon)	1
UK Album Downloads (Official Charts)	78

=== Year-end charts ===
Chart (2019)	Position
South Korean Albums (Gaon)	18

== Awards and nominations ==
Year	Award	Category	Result	Ref.
2020	34th Golden Disc Awards	Album Bonsang	Won	
2020	34th Golden Disc Awards	Album Daesang	Nominated	

== Release history ==
Country	Date	Format	Label
South Korea	May 20, 2019	CD; digital download; streaming	JYP Entertainment; Dreamus
Various	May 20, 2019	Digital download; streaming	JYP Entertainment; Dreamus

== See also ==
- List of K-pop songs on the Billboard charts
- List of K-pop albums on the Billboard charts
- List of Gaon Album Chart number ones of 2019
