= List of songs written by Jay B =

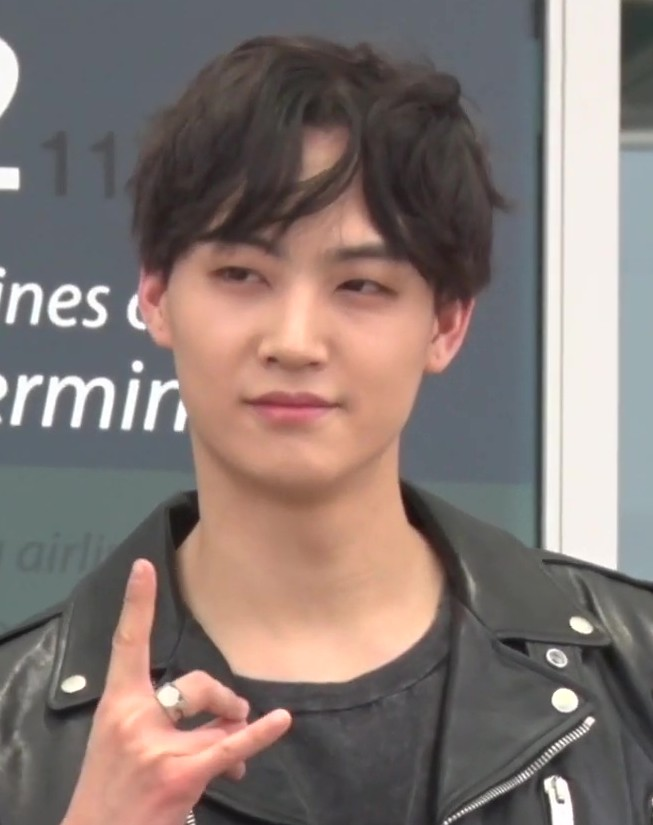
Jay B at Incheon airport in 2019.

Lim Jae-beom (Korean: 임재범; born January 6, 1994), better known as Jay B and formerly JB, is a South Korean singer and songwriter, best known as a member and leader of South Korean boy band Got7.

He got interested in musical composition when he was a b-boy, but started writing songs only after joining JYP Entertainment in 2009: he was first credited as a lyricist for the song "Bad Behaviour" from Got7's 2014 extended play Got Love. In 2016, he became more involved in composition and adopted the pseudonym Defsoul, which was shortened to Def. the following year.

== Songs ==
All song credits are adapted from the Korea Music Copyright Association's database, unless otherwise noted.

=== 2012–2016 ===
Year	Artist	Title	Album	Lyrics		Music	
Year	Artist	Title	Album	Credited	With	Credited	With
2012	JJ Project (with Kim Se-hwang, Robin, DJ Lip2Shot)	"Na Na Na" (Ver. MM Choice) (나나나(Ver. MM Choice))	MM Choice Part. 2	Yes	Junior, San E	No	—N/a
2014	Got7	"Bad Behaviour" (나쁜 짓)	Got Love	Yes	Alex G, Erika Nuri, Andy Love	No	—N/a
2015	Got7	"Mine"	Just Right	Yes	Jung Joo-hee	No	—N/a
2015	Got7	"Everyday" (매일)	Mad Winter Edition	Yes	Cho Wool of Princess Disease, BamBam	Yes	Cho Wool of Princess Disease
2016	Got7	"Fish"	Flight Log: Departure	Yes	Daniel Kim, Park Jiyeon, Dr. B	Yes	Daniel Kim, Park Jiyeon
2016	Got7	"Something Good"	Flight Log: Departure	Yes	BamBam	Yes	Andrew Choi, 220, Mingsician
2016	Got7	"Home Run"	Flight Log: Departure	Yes	Daniel Kim, Park Jiyeon	Yes	Daniel Kim, Park Jiyeon
2016	Got7	"Skyway"	Flight Log: Turbulence	Yes	Earattack	Yes	Earattack, Lish, The Kick Sound
2016	Got7	"Prove It"	Flight Log: Turbulence	Yes	—N/a	Yes	220, Royal Dive
2016	Got7	"Dreamin'" (니꿈꿔)	Flight Log: Turbulence	Yes	Earattack, BamBam	Yes	Earattack
2016	Got7	"If I Never Let You Go…" (離さなければ…)	Hey Yah!	Yes	Frants, Kenji Kabashima	Yes	Frants
2016	Def.	"Holic"	1/? vol. 1	Yes	—N/a	Yes	Mirror Boy
2016	Def.	"Don't Worry"	1/? vol. 1	Yes	—N/a	Yes	Mirror Boy
2016	Def.	"Sin" (feat. Jomalxne)	1/? vol. 1	Yes	Jomalxne	Yes	Mirror Boy, Jomalxne, HNMR
2016	Def.	"Lost"	1/? vol. 1	Yes	—N/a	Yes	Mirror Boy
2016	Def.	"Bad Habit" (feat. Jomalxne)	1/? vol. 1	Yes	Jomalxne, HNMR	Yes	Jomalxne, HNMR, Mirror Boy

=== 2017 ===
Artist	Title	Album	Lyrics		Music	
Artist	Title	Album	Credited	With	Credited	With
Got7	"Shopping Mall"	Flight Log: Arrival	Yes	Earattack, Jackson, BamBam, Mark	No	—N/a
Got7	"Go Higher"	Flight Log: Arrival	Yes	Earattack, Mark, BamBam, Jackson	Yes	Earattack, 5$
Got7	"Q"	Flight Log: Arrival	Yes	GDLO	Yes	GDLO
Got7	"Meet Me"	My Swagger	Yes	Mirror Boy, D.Ham, Moon Hanmiru, Komu	Yes	Mirror Boy, D.Ham, Moon Hanmiru
JJ Project	"Tomorrow, Today" (내일, 오늘)	Verse 2	Yes	Jinyoung, J.Y. Park "The Asiansoul"	No	—N/a
JJ Project	"On & On"	Verse 2	Yes	Mr. Cho, Jinyoung	Yes	Mr. Cho, Jinyoung, Cheongdam-dong Gunwoo
JJ Project	"Icarus"	Verse 2	Yes	Andrew Choi	Yes	Royal Dive, Andrew Choi
JJ Project	"Don't Wanna Know"	Verse 2	Yes	Jinyoung	No	—N/a
JJ Project	"Find You"	Verse 2	Yes	Andrew Choi	Yes	Royal Dive, Andrew Choi
JJ Project	"Fade Away"	Verse 2	Yes	Andrew Choi	Yes	Royal Dive, Andrew Choi
Got7	"Teenager"	7 for 7	Yes	FS	Yes	FS, Royal Dive
Got7	"You Are"	7 for 7	Yes	Mirror Boy, D.Ham, Moon Hanmiru	Yes	Mirror Boy, D.Ham, Moon Hanmiru
Got7	"Turn Up"	Turn Up	Yes	Mirror Boy, D.Ham, Moon Hanmiru, Samuelle Soung	Yes	Mirror Boy, D.Ham, Moon Hanmiru
Got7	"Why"	Turn Up	Yes	Shirai Yuuki	Yes	Royal Dive, Park Joseph, Lee Dong-woo

=== 2018 ===
Artist	Title	Album	Lyrics		Music	
Artist	Title	Album	Credited	With	Credited	With
Def.	"Think of You"	1/? vol. 2	Yes	—N/a	Yes	Royal Dive
Def.	"Channel" (feat. Jeebanoff, Jomalxne)	1/? vol. 2	Yes	Jeebanoff, Jomalxne	Yes	Jeebanoff, Jomalxne, Royal Dive
Def.	"Pray"	1/? vol. 2	Yes	—N/a	Yes	Royal Dive
Got7	"One and Only You" (feat. Hyolyn)	Eyes On You	Yes	—N/a	No	—N/a
Got7	"Look"	Eyes On You	Yes	Mirror Boy, Moon Hanmiru, D.ham	Yes	Mirror Boy, Moon Hanmiru, D.ham
JB	"Rainy"	Hyena on the Keyboard Part. 4	Yes	—N/a	Yes	Yiruma, Moon Hanmiru, Royal Dive
Got7	"Shining On You"	The New Era	Yes	D.ham, Moon Hanmiru, Mirror Boy, Samuelle Soung	Yes	D.ham, Moon Hanmiru, Mirror Boy
Got7	"Hmmmm"	The New Era	Yes	D.ham, Moon Hanmiru, Mirror Boy, Samuelle Soung	Yes	D.ham, Moon Hanmiru, Mirror Boy
JB	"Higher"	Colors	Yes	—N/a	Yes	Deepshower
Got7	"Enough"	Present: You	Yes	D.ham, Moon Hanmiru, Mirror Boy	Yes	D.ham, Moon Hanmiru, Mirror Boy
Got7	"Save You" (지켜줄게)	Present: You	Yes	D.ham, Moon Hanmiru, Mirror Boy	Yes	D.ham, Moon Hanmiru, Mirror Boy
Got7	"Sunrise"	Present: You	Yes	Jomalxne	Yes	Jomalxne, RoseInPeace
Def.	"Sometime"	1/? vol. 3	Yes	—N/a	Yes	RoseInPeace
Def.	"Be With You"	1/? vol. 3	Yes	—N/a	Yes	RoseInPeace
Def.	"Don't Care"	1/? vol. 3	Yes	—N/a	Yes	RoseInPeace
Def.	"Island" (feat. Jomalxne)	1/? vol. 3	Yes	Jomalxne	Yes	RoseInPeace, Jomalxne
Def.	"Blind"	1/? vol. 3	Yes	—N/a	Yes	RoseInPeace
Got7	"Come On" (안 보여)	Present: You & Me	Yes	iHwak	Yes	iHwak, Royal Dive
Got7	"1:31AM" (잘 지내야해)	Present: You & Me	Yes	Ars	Yes	Ars, minGtion, 220
Got7	"Think About It"	Present: You & Me	Yes	Mark Tuan, Ars	Yes	Mark Tuan, Ars, Lee Sang-chul, Mirror Boy

=== 2019 ===
Artist	Title	Album	Lyrics		Music	
Artist	Title	Album	Credited	With	Credited	With
Got7	"Reborn"	I Won't Let You Go	Yes	Ars, Shirai Yuuki	Yes	Ars, Mirror Boy
Jus2	"Focus on Me"	Focus	Yes	Yugyeom	Yes	Yugyeom, Cosmic Boy, OLNL
Jus2	"Drunk On You"	Focus	Yes	Moon Hanmiru, John Napoleon, Keith Hetrick, Nate Gott	Yes	Moon Hanmiru, Keith Hetrick
Jus2	"Touch"	Focus	Yes	—N/a	Yes	Christian Fast, Marcus Lindberg, Tania Doko, Royal Dive
Jus2	"Senses"	Focus	Yes	Moon Hanmiru, Deepshower	Yes	Moon Hanmiru, Deepshower
Jus2	"Breath" (吐息)	Focus (Japan Edition)	Yes	Yugyeom, Stainboys	Yes	Yugyeom, Park Seul-gi (153/Joombas), Go Younghwan
Got7	"Eclipse"	Spinning Top: Between Security & Insecurity	Yes	J.Y. Park "The Asiansoul", D.ham, Mirror Boy, Moon Hanmiru	Yes	Mirror Boy, D.ham, Moon Hanmiru, Daviid, Yosia, NeD, Moon Kim, Vendors
Got7	"Page"	Spinning Top: Between Security & Insecurity	Yes	Jomalxne, Royal Dive, iHwak	Yes	Jomalxne, Royal Dive, iHwak
Offshore	"Surfin" (Mirror Boy feat. Def., Jomalxne)	Scene #1	Yes	Jomalxne, Mirror Boy	Yes	Jomalxne, Mirror Boy
Offshore	"Laze" (RoseInPeace feat. Def., Jomalxne)	Scene #1	Yes	Jomalxne	Yes	Jomalxne, RoseInPeace
Offshore	"Play" (RoseInPeace feat. Jomalxne, Def., HNMR)	Scene #1	Yes	HNMR, Jomalxne, Royal Dive	Yes	HNMR, Jomalxne, Royal Dive
Got7	"Your Space"	Love Loop	Yes	Moon Hanmiru, Jomalxne, T-DOT	Yes	Moon Hanmiru, Jomalxne, RoseInPeace, Choi Yong-wook
Def.	"Something Special"	1/? vol. 4	Yes	—N/a	Yes	Nomad
Def.	"Desire"	1/? vol. 4	Yes	—N/a	Yes	Nomad
Def.	"Deeper"	1/? vol. 4	Yes	—N/a	Yes	Nomad
Def.	"Runaway"	1/? vol. 4	Yes	—N/a	Yes	Nomad
Def.	"Stopline" (feat. Rick Bridges)	1/? vol. 4	Yes	Rick Bridges	Yes	Nomad, Rick Bridges
Got7	"You Calling My Name" (니가 부르는 나의 이름)	Call My Name	Yes	Kim Woo-ram, Lee Seu-ran, J.Y. Park "The Asiansoul"	No	—N/a
Got7	"Pray"	Call My Name	Yes	iHwak, Jomalxne	Yes	iHwak, Jomalxne, Zayson, RoseInPeace
Got7	"Thursday"	Call My Name	Yes	iHwak, Royal Dive	Yes	iHwak, Royal Dive
Def.	"Ring"	1/? vol. 5	Yes	—N/a	Yes	Plan8
Def.	"Diary"	1/? vol. 5	Yes	—N/a	Yes	Plan8
Def.	"Nothing"	1/? vol. 5	Yes	—N/a	Yes	Plan8
Def.	"Curiosi"	1/? vol. 5	Yes	—N/a	Yes	Plan8
Def.	"Come Back to Me"	1/? vol. 5	Yes	—N/a	Yes	Plan8

=== 2020 ===
Artist	Title	Album	Lyrics		Music	
Artist	Title	Album	Credited	With	Credited	With
Offshore	"Simple" (feat. Def., Mirror Boy)	Scene #2	Yes	Mirror Boy	Yes	Mirror Boy, Royal Dive
Offshore	"Smoke" (연기) (feat. Def., Jomalxne)	Scene #2	Yes	Jomalxne	Yes	Jomalxne, RoseInPeace
Offshore	"Take a Walk" (feat. iHwak, HNMR, Def.)	Scene #2	Yes	—N/a	Yes	Mirror Boy, Royal Dive, iHwak, HNMR
Got7	"Crazy"	Dye	Yes	D.ham, Moon Hanmiru, Mirror Boy	Yes	Moon Hanmiru, Mirror Boy
Got7	"Ride"	Dye	Yes	—N/a	Yes	iHwak, Zayson, Royal Dive
Offshore	"Just Stay" (feat. Def., Junny)	Cut #1	Yes	Junny	Yes	Junny, Royal Dive
Offshore	"Sweet Dream" (feat. Def.)	Cut #1	Yes	—N/a	Yes	Royal Dive
Jeebanoff	"Callin" (feat. Def.)	Good Thing (Remix)	Yes	Jeebanoff	Yes	Jeebanoff, Swimgood1
Got7	"Last Piece"	Breath of Love: Last Piece	Yes	D.ham, Jomalxne	Yes	iHwak, Moon Hanmiru, RoseInPeace, Jomalxne, Zayson, Mirror Boy
Wavycake, Ovus	"Dream" (꿈) (feat. Def)	REALusion	Yes	Ovus	Yes	Wavycake, Ovus
$ün	"In December (Sad Night)" (12월엔 (Sad Night)) (feat. Def.)	White	Yes	$ün, Lee Yu-mi, Rudbeckia	Yes	$ün, Rudbeckia, Bae Min-soo, Park Jae-hyung

=== 2021 ===
Artist	Title	Album	Lyrics		Music	
Artist	Title	Album	Credited	With	Credited	With
Offshore	"Cold Night" (feat. Def., HNMR, Jomalxne)	Scene #3	Yes	a	Yes	HNMR, Jomalxne, RoseInPeace
Offshore	"Call Me" (전화해) (feat. Def., Jomalxne)	Scene #3	Yes	Jomalxne	Yes	Jomalxne, RoseInPeace
Jay B	"Switch It Up" (feat. Sokodomo)	Non-album single	Yes	Jay Park, Sokodomo	Yes	Jay Park, Cha Cha Malone
s/s	"Memory" (feat. Def.)	Seesaw	Yes	—N/a	Yes	s/s
Jay B	"B.T.W" (feat. Jay Park)	SOMO:Fume	Yes	Jay Park	Yes	Jay Park, Cha Cha Malone
Jay B	"AM PM" (feat. Wheein)	SOMO:Fume	Yes	Jay Park, Sound Kim	Yes	Sound Kim, Gray, DAX, Chrli
Jay B	"Fame" (feat. JUNNY)	SOMO:Fume	Yes	Junny	Yes	Junny, GroovyRoom, Bin, Bell
Jay B	"In To You" (feat. g1nger)	SOMO:Fume	Yes	g1nger, Jay Park	Yes	g1nger, Jay Park, Woogie
Jay B	"Count on Me"	SOMO:Fume	Yes	—N/a	Yes	Junny, GroovyRoom, Kwaca
Jay B	"Paranoia"	SOMO:Fume	Yes	Jay Park	Yes	Jay Park, pH-1, GroovyRoom
Jay B	"I'm Surfin' (Gangneung & Yangyang)"	Feel the Rhythm of Korea Pt. 1	Yes	—N/a	Yes	GroovyRoom, Bin, Bell
Def. & Fudasca	"Is It A Dream?"	Non-album single	Yes	Simone Eleuteri	Yes	Fudasca
Mirani	"P.S." (feat. Jay B)	Uptown Girl	Yes	Mirani	Yes	Mirani, Jintae Ko, Charlie Snyder, Sofia Quinn, Dom Perfetti, Defsoul, GroovyRoom
Ourealgoat	"Thought of You" (생각했어) (feat. Jay B)	Non-album single	Yes	Ourealgoat	No	—N/a
Junny, Jay B	"Nostalgia"	Nostalgia	Yes	Junny, Jane	Yes	Junny, No2zcate

=== 2022 ===
Artist	Title	Album	Lyrics		Music	
Artist	Title	Album	Credited	With	Credited	With
Def.	"Again" (feat. Leon)	Love.	Yes	Leon	Yes	Royal Dive, Mirror Boy, Saimon, Leon
Def.	"Why?" (왜그래?)	Love.	Yes	—N/a	Yes	Royal Dive, Saimon, Mirror Boy
Def.	"I Just Wanna Know"	Love.	Yes	—N/a	Yes	Mirror Boy, Royal Dive, Saimon
Def.	"Like a Fool" (바보같이) (feat. Junny)	Love.	Yes	Junny	Yes	Mirror Boy, Simon, Royal Dive, Junny
Def.	"Want U"	Love.	Yes	—N/a	Yes	Saimon, Royal Dive, Mirror Boy
Def.	"Sunset With You"	Love.	Yes	—N/a	Yes	Saimon, Mirror Boy, Royal Dive
NXPS	"Night" (feat. Def.)	Non-album single	Yes	NXPS	Yes	NXPS, Deepshower
Bigone	"Windy Day" (바람이 나를 안을 때)	BIGONEISTHENAME	Yes	Bigone	Yes	Nmore, Bigone, Hong Hoon-gi
Got7	"Truth"	Got7	Yes	Leon, iHwak	Yes	iHwak, HRDR, Leon
Got7	"Nanana"	Got7	Yes	iHwak	Yes	iHwak, Royal Dive
Got7	"Don't Leave Me Alone"	Got7	Yes	iHwak	Yes	iHwak, Royal Dive
H1ghr Music	"BRB"	Non-album single	Yes	Haon, Sik-K, Trade L, Big Naughty, pH-1, Park Hyeon-jin, Jay Park	Yes	Cha Cha Malone, GroovyRoom, Haon, Sik-K, Trade L, Big Naughty, pH-1, Park Hyeon-jin, Jay Park
Skinny Brown, Kim Seung-min, Jay B, Big Naughty	"Lone Wolf (3:00 AM)" (풀리지 않는 고민) (3:00 am)	Listen-Up EP.3	Yes	Skinny Brown, Kim Seung-min, Big Naughty	Yes	Skinny Brown, Kim Seung-min, Big Naughty, Dress
SMMT	"I'll Be Fine" (feat. Jay B)	Mr. Hollywood	Yes	—N/a	Yes	SMMT
Jay B	"Go Up"	Be Yourself	Yes	Son Jung-hwa (Jam Factory), Yoo Da-eun (Jam Factory), Sabon	No	—N/a
Jay B	"Break It Down" (feat. Sik-K)	Be Yourself	Yes	Sik-K, Leon	Yes	Sik-K, Leon, Royal Dive
Jay B	"Livin'"	Be Yourself	Yes	—N/a	Yes	Junny, Royal Dive
Jay B	"The Way We Are"	Be Yourself	Yes	Joo Yoon-kyung, Sabon, Cha Yu-bin	No	—N/a
Jay B	"Fountain of Youth"	Be Yourself	No	—N/a	Yes	Andrew Stoelzing, Dougie F, Im Jung-woo, Paprikaa
Jay B	"Holyday"	Be Yourself	No	—N/a	Yes	iHwak, Mirror Boy, Royal Dive
Jomalxne feat. Jay B	"GZRGH" (꺼지라고해)	Sky Walker	No	—N/a	Yes	Jomalxne, Royal Dive, Zayson, RoseInPeace
Def.	"My Bad"	Abandoned Love.	Yes	—N/a	Yes	Wavycake, Mirror Boy
Def.	"Calm Down"	Abandoned Love.	Yes	—N/a	Yes	Wavycake, Mirror Boy
Def.	"My Abandoned Love"	Abandoned Love.	Yes	—N/a	Yes	Wavycake, Mirror Boy
Def.	"Not Easy"	Abandoned Love.	Yes	—N/a	Yes	Wavycake, Mirror Boy
Def.	"Right" (맞아)	Abandoned Love.	Yes	—N/a	Yes	Wavycake, Mirror Boy
Def.	"You Say"	Abandoned Love.	Yes	—N/a	Yes	Wavycake, Mirror Boy
Def.	"Will Spring Come?" (봄이 올까?)	Non-album single	Yes	—N/a	Yes	Mirror Boy, Noden, Chillingcat

=== 2023–present ===
Year	Artist	Title	Album	Lyrics		Music	
Year	Artist	Title	Album	Credited	With	Credited	With
2023	Soulbysel, Def.	"About You"	Soulbysel Compilation 04	Yes	—N/a	Yes	Noair, Plan8, Daul
2023	Jay B	"One Moment" (잠시만)	Seasonal Hiatus	Yes	—N/a	Yes	1of1, Holynn, Akira
2023	Jay B	"Whiskey"	Seasonal Hiatus	Yes	—N/a	Yes	Woogie, iHwak
2023	Jay B	"Wonder"	Seasonal Hiatus	Yes	Jo Yoon-kyung	Yes	Mikey!, En
2023	Offshore	"Favorite" (feat. Def., Junny, iHwak, Royal Dive)	Scene #4	Yes	Junny, iHwak, Royal Dive	Yes	Junny, iHwak, Royal Dive
2023	Offshore	"Bada" (feat. Def., Leon, Mirror Boy)	Scene #4	Yes	Leon, Mirror Boy	Yes	Leon, Mirror Boy
2023	Offshore	"Hell of a Life" (feat. iHwak, Def., Junny, Mirror Boy)	Scene #4	Yes	iHwak, Junny, Mirror Boy	Yes	iHwak, Junny, Mirror Boy
2023	DXTEEN	"Snowin'"	Non-album single	Yes	D.ham, Mirror Boy, Moon Hanmiru	Yes	D.ham, Mirror Boy, Moon Hanmiru
2024	Jay B	"Baby"	Archive 1: [Road Runner]	Yes	iHwak	Yes	iHwak, Royal Dive
2024	Jay B	"If You"	Archive 1: [Road Runner]	Yes	—N/a	Yes	Royal Dive
2024	Jay B	"Make Me Right"	Archive 1: [Road Runner]	Yes	Leon	Yes	Leon, LNB
2024	Jay B	"Chosen"	Archive 1: [Road Runner]	Yes	—N/a	Yes	Royal Dive
2024	Jay B	"Take it Easy"	Archive 1: [Road Runner]	Yes	Junny	Yes	Royal Dive, Junny
2024	Jay B	"Crash"	Archive 1: [Road Runner]	Yes	Paul Blanco, Jomalxne	Yes	Saimon, RoseInPeace, Paul Blanco, Jomalxne
2024	Jay B	"Preview"	Archive 1: [Road Runner]	Yes	D.ham	Yes	Moon Hanmiru, Mirror Boy
2024	Jay B	"°C (Temperature)" (온도)	Archive 1: [Road Runner]	Yes	—N/a	Yes	Lee Sang-chul, Moon Hanmiru, Mirror Boy
2024	Jay B	"Right Back"	Archive 1: [Road Runner]	Yes	Zayson	Yes	Zayson
2024	Jay B	"Inside"	Archive 1: [Road Runner]	Yes	iHwak	Yes	iHwak, Puzzle Shop, Jayden, Yoo Je-hyuk
2024	Jay B	"Cloud Nine"	Archive 1: [Road Runner]	Yes	—N/a	Yes	Spencer William, Markie Alvin Thompson, Baeeum, Largo, Chad, iHwak
2024	Jay B	"Present"	Archive 1: [Road Runner]	Yes	—N/a	Yes	Kim Wook
2024	Jay B	"Winter Night"	Archive 1: [Road Runner]	Yes	—N/a	Yes	NO2ZCAT, Vella
2025	Got7	"Darling"	Winter Heptagon	Yes	—N/a	Yes	iHwak, Jay Dope
2025	Got7	"Yours Truly," (우리가할수있는말은.)	Winter Heptagon	Yes	Got7	Yes	Wuk
2026	Jay B	"Hold Onto My Back"	TR.EE	Yes	—N/a	Yes	iHwak, Jay Dope, Nieah
2026	Jay B	"Layback"	TR.EE	Yes	—N/a	Yes	U1, No2zcat, Pac Odd
2026	Jay B	"Overflow"	TR.EE	Yes	—N/a	Yes	iHwak, Bcalm, KV
2026	Jay B	"One Call Away"	TR.EE	Yes	Akira	Yes	Akira, Royal Dive
2026	Jay B	"Time"	TR.EE	Yes	Akira	Yes	Royal Dive, Akira
2026	Jay B	"We"	TR.EE	Yes	Akira	Yes	Zayson, Royal Dive, Akira
2026	Def.	"Intro"	2018.12.25	Yes	Choi Ji-yoon	Yes	Royal Dive
2026	Def.	"Anybody"	2018.12.25	Yes	—N/a	Yes	Mirror Boy
2026	Def.	"N"	2018.12.25	Yes	—N/a	Yes	Mirror Boy
2026	Def.	"Boy"	2018.12.25	Yes	—N/a	Yes	RoseInPeace, Mirror Boy
2026	Def.	"City"	2018.12.25	Yes	—N/a	Yes	Deep Shower, Slim, Mirror Boy
2026	Def.	"Well"	2018.12.25	Yes	—N/a	Yes	Mirror Boy
2026	Def.	"Misty"	2018.12.25	Yes	—N/a	Yes	Mirror Boy
2026	Def.	"I Can't"	2018.12.25	Yes	—N/a	Yes	Mirror Boy
2026	Def.	"Cold"	2018.12.25	Yes	—N/a	Yes	Deep Shower, Slim, Mirror Boy
2026	Jay B	"Honeydew"	Chptr. 1	Yes	Kim Anna	Yes	Jake K, Kellan Barrett, Steve Cooper, Kayla Diamond, Kyle Takata
2026	Jay B	"Sweetie"	Chptr. 1	Yes	Zayson	Yes	Zayson
