= Tiger is Coming =

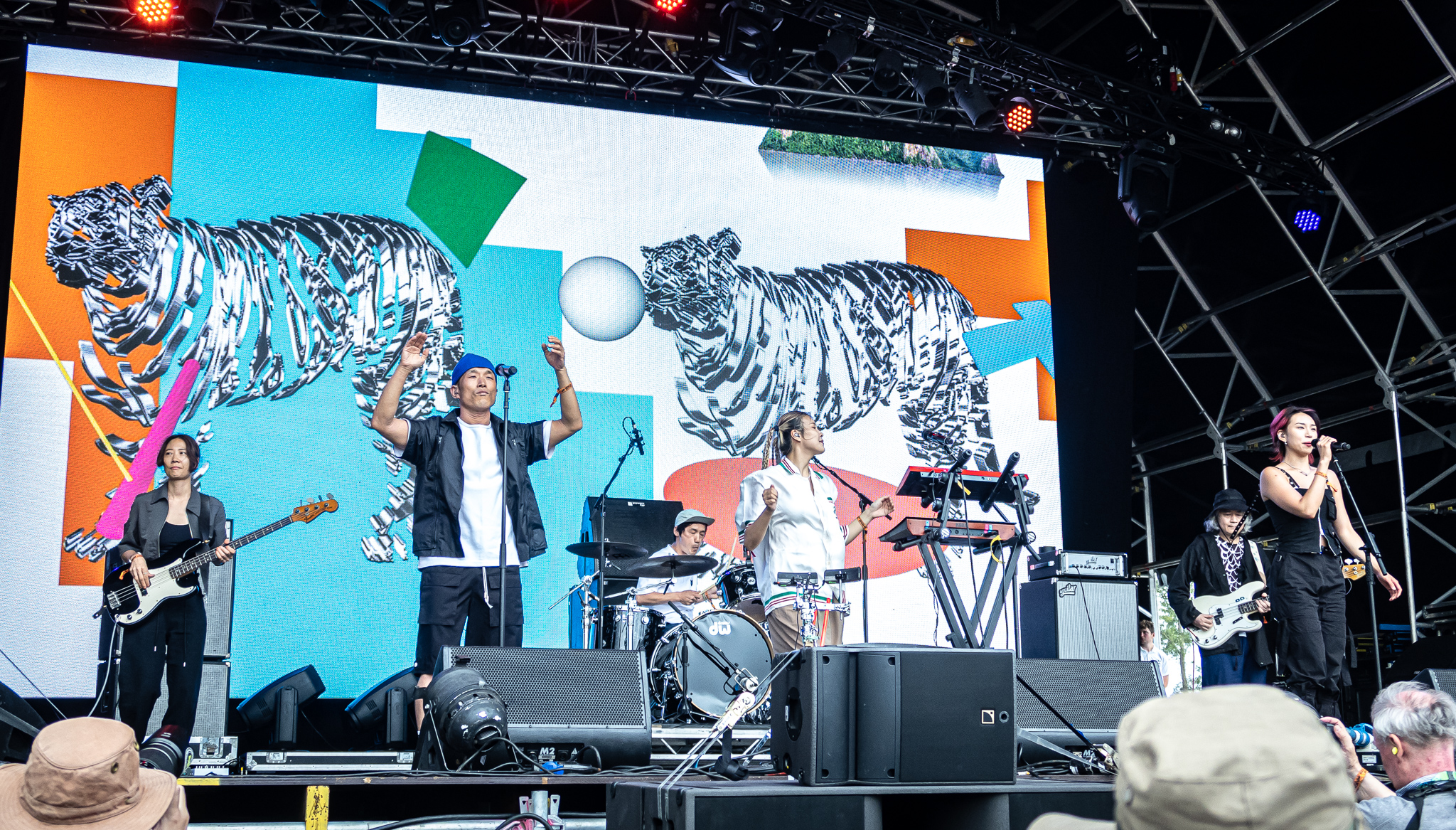
- Leenalchi performing Tiger is Coming in WOMAD 2023

Song by Leenalchi
- Language: Korean
- Released: September 19, 2019
- Genre: Alternative pop
- Length: 1:37
- Composer: Leenalchi
- Lyricist: Sugungga

Tiger is Coming (Korean: 범 내려온다) is a promotional video for Seoul featuring a modern pansori-inspired song and dance reinterpreting the scene in Sugungga where the land animals brag to one another while the tiger emerges from a mountain valley. The song as part of the album SUGUNGGA was officially released May 29, 2020. However, the performance version was published on September 19, 2019.

== Sugungga ==
The 'Tiger Is Coming' section of Sugungga, which includes the lyrics shown below.

범내려 온다 범이 내려온다 송림 깊은 골로 한 짐생이 내려온다 누에머리를 흔들며 양귀 쭉 찢어지고 몸은 얼쑹덜쑹 꼬리는 잔뜩 한발이 넘고 동이 같은 앞다리 전동같은 뒷다리 새낫같은 발톱으로 엄동설한 백설격으로 잔디뿌리 왕모래 좌르르르르르 헛치고 주홍입 쩍 벌리고 자래 앞에거 우뚝서 홍행홍행 허는 소리 산천이 뒤덮고 땅이 툭 깨지난 듯 자라가 깜짝놀래 목을 움치고 가만히 엎졌을 때

== Feel the Rhythm of Korea ==
Leenalchi and Ambiguous Dance Company's 'Tiger is Coming' is well known by the Korea Tourism Organization's bold promotional campaign, Feel the Rhythm of Korea.

== See also ==
- Traditional music of Korea
- Daechwita
