= Verse 2 =

EP by JJ Project
- Released: July 31, 2017
- Recorded: 2017
- Genres: Pop; alternative rock; hip hop; R&B
- Label: JYP Entertainment
- Producers: J.Y. Park "The Asiansoul"; Defsoul; Jinyoung

JJ Project chronology
Bounce (2012)	Verse 2 (2017)

Singles from Verse 2
- 1. "Tomorrow, Today" Released: July 31, 2017

Verse 2 is the first extended play by South Korean male duo JJ Project. It was released on July 31, 2017, under JYP Entertainment and incorporates a variety of genres like pop, hip-hop and rock. The album contains eight tracks, with two only available on the physical release. The track "Tomorrow, Today" was chosen as the lead single for the promotional cycle.

== Background and composition ==
In 2012, JB and Jinyoung originally debuted as JJ Project under JYP Entertainment with the upbeat hip-hop single "Bounce". Two years later the duo returned as part of the boy group Got7. Verse 2 is the duo's first album after five years. The album contains eight tracks of various genres from pop and alternative rock to hip-hop, adopting lyrical but bright-toned melodies. Among them, Jinyoung and JB added their own solo songs "The Day" and "Fade Away" as a hidden track that can only be heard on the CD. According to the duo, they wrote lyrics based on their anxieties going through life in their 20s. Calmness, vagueness and loneliness permeate the record.

"Coming Home" opens the record with the message "now I'm back", and was written by Jinyoung on the airplane while feeling melancholic and missing his parents. The lead track of the album, "Tomorrow, Today", is co-written by the duo and Park Jin-young, the founder of the label and the duo's producer. It features coming-of-age stories of the two in a more laid-back style and its lyrics are more personal and intimate than the duo's previous efforts. The song features a gentle, percussive rhythm and harmonious melodies and its lyrics highlight the difficulty of making decisions about the future while being tied to the present, talking about the time when young people who have infinite potential and endless weaknesses face their lives, and the agony of having to choose one of two paths. The accompanying music video is in line with the song's message and shows JB and Jinyoung traveling in an old car, closing with the two reading books such as J.D. Salinger's "The Catcher in the Rye", which is a quintessential book for rebellious youth, and Paulo Coelho "Veronika Decides to Die". It was filmed in Hokkaido, Japan.

"On&On" talks about the world's rules, "Icarus" speaks of running toward a dream and takes inspiration from Icarus's myth, while "Don't Wanna Know" is the story of JB's youth and the troubles he has felt. "Fade Away" is a R&B track, while "The Day" is a ballad that carries the message that good things aren't always good, and bad things aren't always bad.

The duo also held a photography exhibition at the North Korean Gallery in Hannam-dong from July 31 to August 6 to commemorate the release of the new album, which is composed of photographs they have taken and own essays. The same day of the release, JJ Project held a showcase at Yes24 Live Hall, Seoul, which aired simultaneously through V Live.

== Critical reception ==
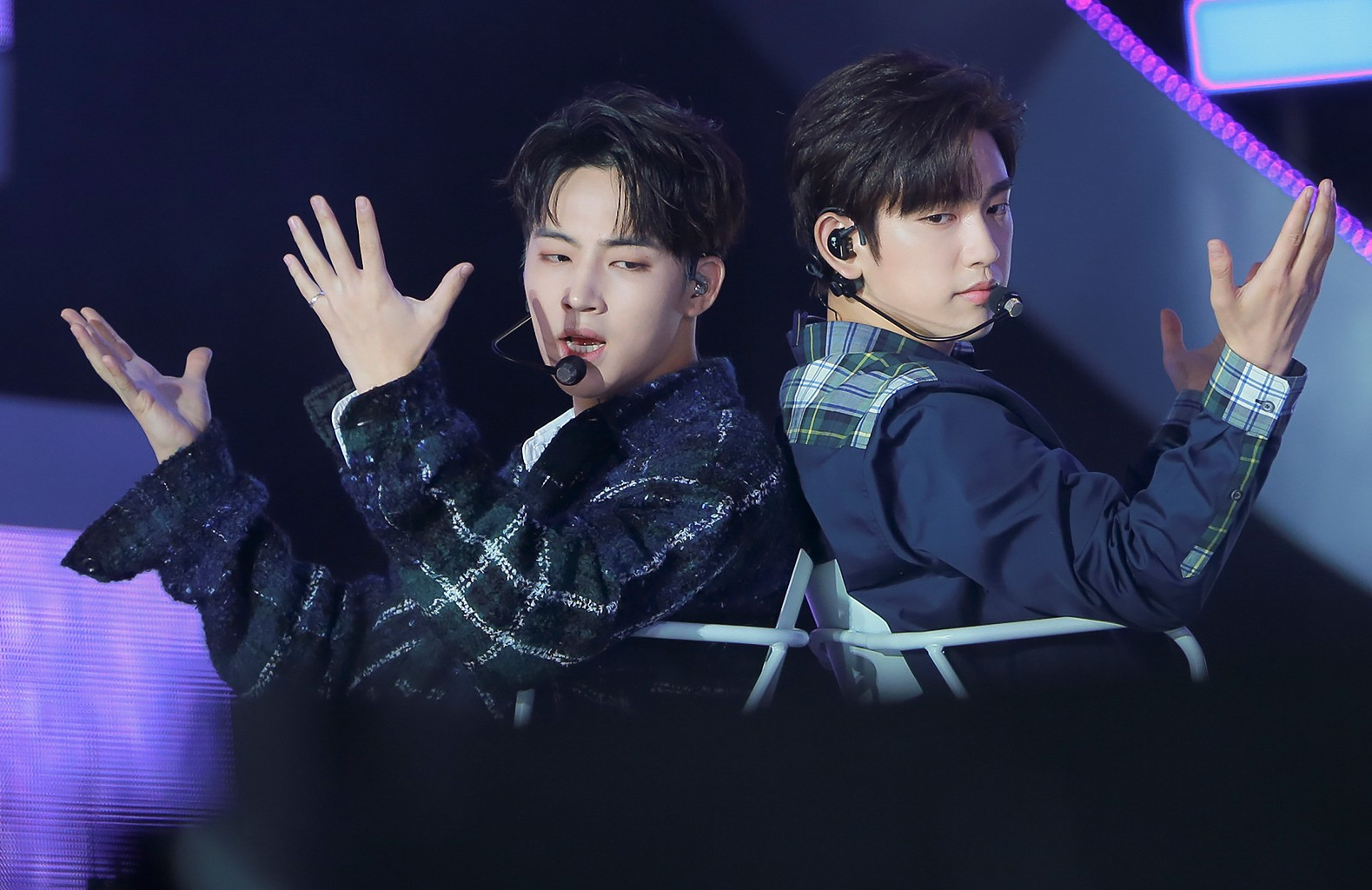
JJ Project performing "Tomorrow, Today" at the Inkigayo Super Concert in 2017.

The Kraze defined Verse 2 "a mature, relaxed discussion through the trials and tribulations of adult life." It described "Tomorrow, Today" as "a gorgeous, bittersweet R&B track that doesn't end with a solid resolution in its lyrics, which is actually very fitting; there is never one straightforward answer to beginning a new life transition," stating that the song, in its difference with "Bounce", highlights the musical evolution of the duo.

For Idology, it's an example of mature K-pop that "creates a unique melancholy in a contemplative and dignified atmosphere by adding the flavor of modern rock and the beat of hip-hop" to the R&B narrative.

At the end of the year, Verse 2 was chosen as the fifth best K-pop album of 2017 by Billboard and was nominated in the album division at the Golden Disc Awards. In 2019, it ranked #21 in Billboard's list of the 25 greatest K-pop album of the 2010s, with the magazine calling it "a stunning collection of heartfelt, harmony-heavy tunes."

== Commercial performance ==
The album was a commercial success in South Korea and charted at number two of the Gaon Album Chart, selling over 116,000 album copies in the month of release. In the United States, Verse 2 charted at number two on the Billboard World Albums chart, marking it the biggest-selling K-pop album in America for the week ending August 3, 2017. According to Nielsen Music it sold 1,000 copies. The album also charted at number nine on the Billboard Heatseekers Albums chart, which makes it only the seventh K-pop album to enter the Top 10 of Heatseekers in 2017. Its title song, "Tomorrow, Today" charted at number nine on the World Digital Song Sales chart and was the week's fifth best-selling K-pop song in America. It's also a new peak for the duo on the chart, who only charted with "Bounce" back in 2012, which debuted at number fourteen.

== Track listing ==
Credits adapted from the official homepage.

No.	Title	Lyrics	Music	Arrangements	Length
1.	"Coming Home"	Jinyoung; Distract	Jinyoung; Distract; Secret Weapon	Secret Weapon	3:32
2.	"Tomorrow, Today" (내일, 오늘)	J.Y. Park "The Asiansoul"; Jinyoung; Defsoul (JB)	Lee Woomin "collapsedone"; Mayu Wakisaka	Lee Woomin "collapsedone"	3:55
3.	"On&On"	Defsoul (JB); Jinyoung; mr.cho	Defsoul (JB); Jinyoung; mr.cho; Cheongdam-dong Gunwoo	Cheongdam-dong Gunwoo	3:34
4.	"Icarus"	Defsoul (JB); Andrew Choi	Defsoul (JB); Andrew Choi; Royal Dive	Royal Dive	3:44
5.	"Don't Wanna Know"	Defsoul (JB); Jinyoung	Devine Channel	Devine Channel	3:43
6.	"Find You"	Defsoul (JB); Andrew Choi	Defsoul; Andrew Choi; Royal Dive	Royal Dive	4:03
7.	"The Day" (그날 (Jinyoung solo))	Jinyoung; Jukjae; Ju Daekwan (MonoTree)	Jukjae; Ju Daekwan (MonoTree)	Jukjae; Ju Daekwan (MonoTree)	3:43
8.	"Fade Away" (JB solo)	Defsoul; Andrew Choi	Defsoul; Andrew Choi; Royal Dive	Royal Dive	2:55

Bonus track of the Taiwan version

No.	Title	Lyrics	Music	Arrangements	Length
9.	"Bounce"	J.Y. Park "The Asiansoul"	J.Y. Park "The Asiansoul"	J.Y. Park "The Asiansoul"; Shin Bong-won; Lee Woo-min; Jo Sung-been	3:15

== Charts ==
Chart (2017)	Peak position
South Korean Albums (Gaon)	2
Japanese Albums (Oricon)	29
US Heatseekers Albums (Billboard)	9
US World Albums (Billboard)	2

== Release history ==
Region	Date	Format	Label
South Korea	July 31, 2017	CD; Digital download	JYP Entertainment; Genie Music
Various	July 31, 2017	Digital download	JYP Entertainment
