= Be Yourself (EP) =

- Digital cover

EP by Jay B
- Released: September 21, 2022
- Genres: Funk; hip-hop; R&B
- Length: 17:26
- Languages: Korean; English
- Label: CDNZA

Jay B chronology
Love (2022)	Be Yourself (2022)	Abandoned Love. (2022)

Be Yourself is the third extended play by South Korean singer Jay B, released on September 21, 2022, through CDNZA Records.

== Background and release ==
After signing with CDNZA Records on July 22, 2022, Jay B immediately started working on a new album, beginning with writing the lyrics, and Be Yourself was announced the following September 2. The theme of the album is to express oneself freely without caring what others think, and was born from suggestions sent to the singer by fans about what kind of music they would like to hear. Jay B stated that he didn't decide on the theme in advance, but that he developed it by working and thought he wanted to talk about himself getting stronger. "Sunny" counterpart of SOMO:Fume and Love., Be Yourself draws inspiration from the singer's b-boy roots, celebrating freedom and friendship in a pop atmosphere of gratitude.

Under the pseudonym Def., Jay B is credited for the lyrics or composition of all tracks. The first song, "Go Up", combines funk pop and new jack swing, with the lyrics talking about going beyond other people's expectations and finding true freedom. "Break It Down", which features rapper Sik-K, urges to try something new, "Livin'" talks about setting independent goals and expectations for the future, and "The Way We Are" is a message for his fans. The last two songs are entirely in English: "Fountain of Youth" expresses the value of friendship, while the slow R&B song "Holyday", based on gospel, is a thank you and encouragement to conquer the world.

== Critical reception ==
Divyansha Dongre of Rolling Stone India stated: "Be Yourself's ingenious storytelling with a wondrous soundscape and vocal performance weaves a tranquil ambiance, making it easy for the listener to not only understand Jay B at a deeper level but seamlessly follow his train of thoughts too. Though just six tracks long, the EP is thematically tight with a clear message and rarely digresses from its core theme. It is not far from being the sonic equivalent of a self-help guide that teaches you how to live life than merely exist."

For Nandini Iyengar of Bollywood Hungama, "with Be Yourself he presents us Jay B who paints a vibrant picture of living life in the moment and living it as honestly as possible." She noted that the singer, in addition to giving a sneak peek of his thoughts and heartfelt note of gratitude to the Got7 members and fans, had amalgamated different genres, sonically beautiful melodies and thoughtful lyrics, concluding "Be Yourself definitely feels like a spring album and utter triumph in his discography."

NME defined Be Yourself "an oeuvre that is complex as it is cohesive," whose credit goes to "Jay B's painfully crystalline voice, striking when you least expect it, whether he plays with high or low registers, hip hop verses or sweeping ballads." In an article recommending the must listen songs released in September 2022, Sports Donga's journalist Jeon Hyo-jin included "Break It Down", commenting that the record itself was a representation of freedom and put a person at ease, and wondering how far Jay B's musical spectrum could further expand.

At the end of the year, Bandwagon included it in the list of the best albums of 2022, praising the sonic richness and exploration of other genres besides the R&B Jay B is known for.

== Commercial performance ==
Be Yourself debuted in seventh place in South Korea on the Circle Weekly Album Chart, with 34,000 copies sold. It was the 16th best selling album for the month of September 2022, with 51,453 copies.

== Track listing ==
No.	Title	Lyrics	Music	Arrangement	Length
1.	"Go Up"	Def.; Son Jung-hwa (Jam Factory); Yoo Da-eun (Jam Factory); Sabon	Thomas Troelsen; Sandro Cavazza; Dhani Lennevald	Thomas Troelsen	2:39
2.	"Break It Down" (featuring Sik-K)	Def.; Sik-K; Leon	Def.; Sik-K; Leon; Royal Dive	Royal Dive	2:51
3.	"Livin'"	Def.	Def.; Junny; Royal Dive	Royal Dive	3:11
4.	"The Way We Are"	Def.; Jo Yoon-kyung; Sabon; Cha Yu-bin	Ryan "Rykeyz" Williamson; Dewain Whitmore Jr.; Patrick "J. Que" Smith	Ryan "Rykeyz" Williamson	2:29
5.	"Fountain of Youth"	Andrew Stoelzing; Troy	Def.; Andrew Stoelzing; Dougie F; Im Jung-woo; Paprikaa	Paprikaa; Im Jung-woo	3:09
6.	"Holiday"	Troy	Def.; iHwak; Mirror Boy; Royal Dive	Mirror Boy; Royal Dive	3:07
Total length:					17:26

== Personnel ==
Credits adapted from Mania Database.

- Def. (Jay B) – lyrics (tracks 1–4), composition (tracks 2–3, 5–6)
- Son Jung-hwa (Jam Factory) – lyrics (track 1)
- Yoo Da-eun (Jam Factory) – lyrics (track 1)
- Sabon – lyrics (tracks 1, 4)
- Thomas Troelsen – composition (track 1), arrangements (track 1), background vocals (track 1), drums (track 1), keyboard (track 1), synthesizer (track 1)
- Sandro Cavazza – composition (track 1)
- Dhani Lennevald – composition (track 1)
- Park Eon-seo – background vocals (tracks 1–2)
- Sik-K – lyrics (track 2), composition (track 2)
- Leon – lyrics (track 2), composition (track 2)
- Royal Dive – composition (tracks 2–3, 6), arrangements (tracks 2–3, 6), direction (tracks 2–3)
- Shin Sang-ho – background vocals (track 2)
- Jeon Byung-seon – bass (tracks 2–3)
- Junny – composition (track 3)
- Jo Sung-hwak – background vocals (track 3)
- Hong Yeong-in – piano (track 3)
- Joo Yoon-kyung – lyrics (track 4)
- Cha Yu-bin – lyrics (track 4)
- Ryan "Rykeyz" Williamson – composition (track 4), arrangements (track 4)
- Dewain Whitmore Jr. – composition (track 4)
- Patrick "J. Que" Smith – composition (track 4)
- Andrew Stoelzing – lyrics (track 5), composition (track 5)
- Troy – lyrics (tracks 5–6)
- Dougie F – composition (track 5)
- Im Jung-woo – composition (track 5), arrangements (track 5)
- Paprikaa – composition (track 5), arrangements (track 5), vocal direction (tracks 1, 4)
- iHwak – composition (track 6), direction (track 3)
- Mirror Boy – composition (track 6), arrangements (track 6)
- Lee Kyung-won – recording (tracks 1, 3), digital editing (track 1)
- Ahn Chang-gyu – recording (tracks 1–2), digital editing (tracks 1–2)
- Gu Jong-pil – mixing (track 1)
- Kwon Nam-woo – mastering (tracks 1, 3)
- Park Gyeong-seon – mixing (track 2), mastering (track 2)
- Kwon Yoo-jin – digital editing (track 3)
- Bcalm – mixing (track 3)

== Charts ==
=== Weekly charts ===
Weekly chart performance for Be Yourself
Chart (2022)	Peak position
South Korean Albums (Circle)	7

=== Monthly charts ===
Monthly chart performance for Be Yourself
Chart (2022)	Peak position
South Korean Albums (Circle)	16
