= TR.EE =

- Digital cover

EP by Jay B
- Released: June 10, 2026
- Genres: R&B; Soul
- Length: 20:53
- Language: Korean
- Label: 528Hz

Jay B chronology
Archive 1: [Road Runner] (2024)	TR.EE (2026)

TR.EE is the fifth extended play by South Korean singer Jay B, released on June 10, 2026.

== Background ==
First album released by Jay B after signing with 528Hz, the singer wrote the lyrics and co-composed all the tracks under the moniker Def. Jay B began working on the EP after reading the line "The driving force behind a tree's growth is that it shakes. The more it shakes, the deeper its roots grow" from Hanyang University professor Yoo Young-man's book A Tree Doesn't Blame a Tree. Realizing that he was going through a period of growth and that the uneasiness he was feeling might be due to excitement rather than anxiety, he decided to express these feelings through music. He stated that he considers the project a more condensed version of his previous studio album Archive 1: [Road Runner]. It took him about a year to make it, and he only identified trees and roots as the main theme after he had finished writing all the songs. While composing, Jay B listened to a lot of his own music, but also jazz, Justin Timberlake and Timbaland.

TR.EE reflects on the bonds between people and the growth process that takes place as relationships are formed and evolve, using the metaphor of the tree throughout the album and presenting, according to Cosmopolitan Indonesia, "a much more emotional, intimate, honest and open side of Jay B" compared to his previous works. Sonically, the light sound of the guitar and piano blends with the singer's soft voice.

The tracks were arranged to simulate the structure of a tree, but in reverse. The opening track "Hold onto My Back", entirely in English, ideally represents the fruit and talks about the comfort of relying on someone at the beginning of a relationship. "Layback" talks about the tension, expectation and uncertainty when two people start to get closer, and wants to communicate that sometimes it is necessary to take a step back and adopt a more relaxed mindset. "Overflow" explores attraction and emotional connection even in moments of silence. "One Call Away" talks about a relationship that feels close but distant, and "Time" about the strength of a bond that survives despite changes. The emotional core of the EP is the last track, "We", which represents the roots and talks about the human ability to form unbreakable bonds that carry through life's ups and downs. It shares guitar arpeggios with "Hold onto My Back" to tie the two songs together.

== Critical reception ==
According to Monica Yadav of Hindustan Times, TR.EE is a record imbued with a sense of freedom that sits with quieter emotions rather than making a loud statement, exploring "love, distance, comfort and companionship without forcing neat conclusions" and reminding listeners that growth is not always obvious. Debashree Dutta of Rolling Stone India called it a cohesive piece of work that invites people to immerse themselves in a story that builds slowly, like "watching someone patiently plant something in real-time, waiting out the seasons rather than forcing it to bloom overnight".

== Track listing ==
All tracks are written by Def.

No.	Title	Lyrics	Music	Arrangement	Length
1.	"Hold onto My Back"		iHwak; Jay Dope; Nieah	Jay Dope; Nieah	3:06
2.	"Layback"		U1; no2zcat; pac odd	no2zcat; pac odd	3:11
3.	"Overflow"		iHwak; bcalm; KV	bcalm	2:56
4.	"One Call Away"	Akira	Akira; Royal Dive	Royal Dive; Akira	4:00
5.	"Time"	Akira	Royal Dive; Akira	Royal Dive; Akira	3:45
6.	"We"	Akira	Zayson; Royal Dive; Akira	Royal Dive; Zayson; Akira	3:55
Total length:					20:53

== Charts ==
TR.EE debuted at No. 8 on the Circle Weekly Albums Chart with 39,380 copies sold.

=== Weekly charts ===
Weekly chart performance for TR.EE
Chart (2026)	Peak position
South Korean Albums (Circle)	8

=== Monthly charts ===
Monthly chart performance for TR.EE
Chart (2026)	Peak position
South Korean Albums (Circle)	33
