= Leenalchi =

South Korean pansori pop band

Leenalchi (이날치)
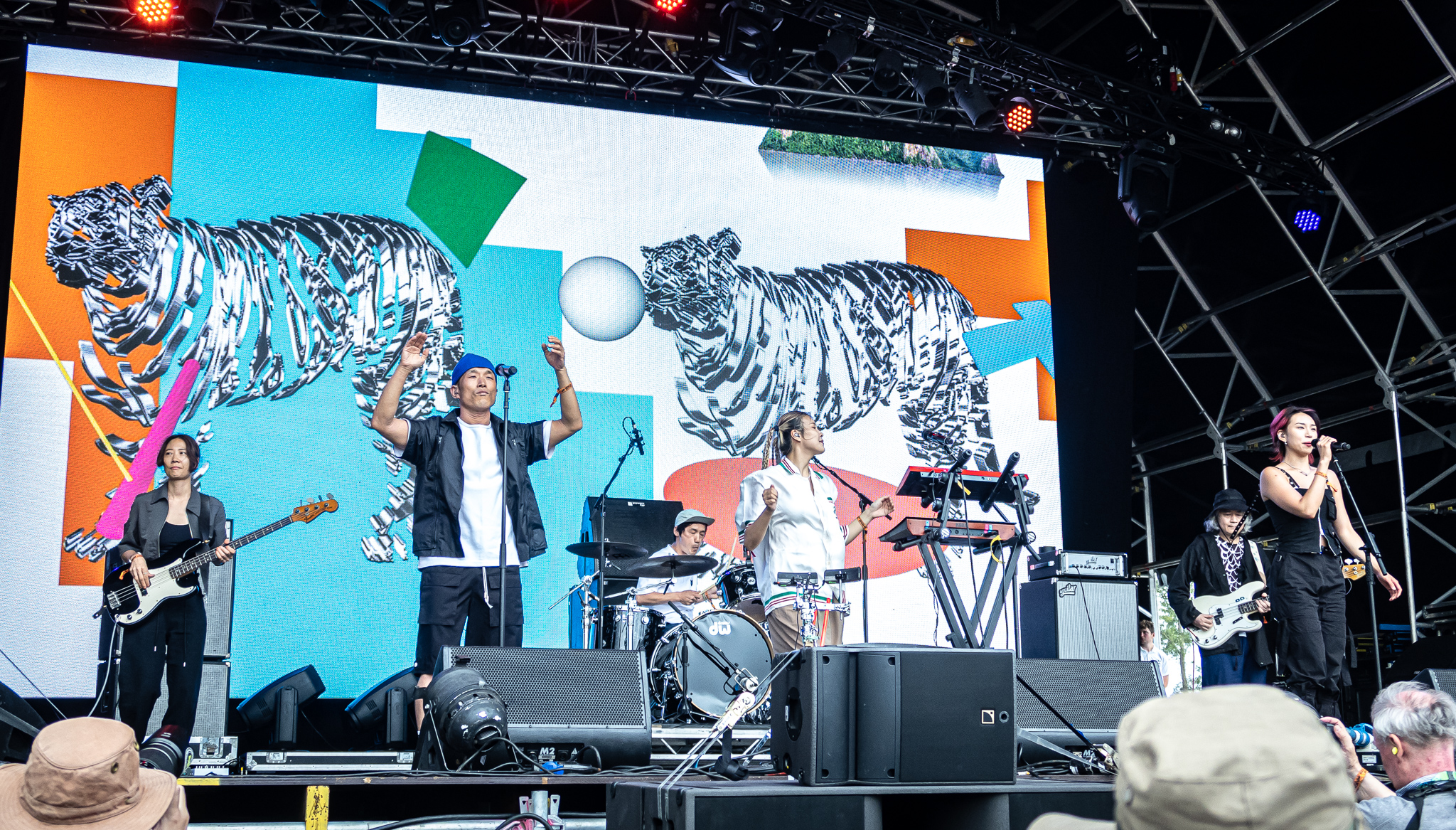
- Leenalchi at WOMAD in 2023

Background information
- Origin: Seoul, South Korea
- Genres: pansori, Alternative rock, gugak
- Years active: 2019–present
- Label: HIKE
- Members: Jang Young-gyu; An Yi-ho; Choi Suin; Ra Seojin; Park Soo-beom; Ejae; Oh Hyung Suk
- Past members: Lee Chul-hee; Lee Narae; Shin Yu-jin; Kwon Song-hee; Chun Hyo-jeong; Noddy Woo; Lee Yong-jin; Jeong Jung-yeop; Park Jun-cheol

Leenalchi (Korean: 이날치) is a South Korean pansori pop band formed in 2019.

== Members ==
The band has a unique lineup, with two female and two male traditional Korean singers, two bassists and a drummer. The traditional singers are graduates of Seoul National University's traditional music department. Bassist Jang Young-gyu scored the films "The Wailing" (2016) and "Train to Busan" (2016) and played bass for SsingSsing. Fellow bassist Jeong Jung-yeop previously played bass for Kiha and the Faces. Drummer Lee Chul-hee was also drummer for SsingSsing. The band is named after Lee Nal-chi, a pansori master and jultagi performer of the 1880s. All members participate in coming up with a song in a rhythmic way, "like a Wikipedia article written by many contributors". The band members met during a 2018 performance of "Dragon King" at the Asia Culture Center in Gwangju.

== Work ==
Their first album was influenced by the pansori play Sugungga. The band released its track "Tiger is Coming" as a non-fungible token. Leenalchi were featured in the 2022 Netflix documentary mini-series Midnight Asia: Eat. Dance. Dream., performing in an episode about Seoul's nightlife.

In 2026, the band signed with US label Luaka Bop, and in June 2026 the band released a 6-song EP, Here Comes That Crow, in the U.S. and Canada.

== Reception ==
The band has achieved considerable success, appearing in the Korea Tourism Organization "Feel the Rhythm of Korea" video series promoting the cities of Seoul, Busan, Jeonju, Mokpo, Andong, Gangneung, and Incheon and winning three prizes at the Korean Music Awards in 2021 for Musician of the Year, Best Modern Rock Song, and Best Jazz & Crossover Album. Judges called it the "sexiest album of 2020". The band frequently collaborates with Ambiguous Dance Company.

== Members ==
Current members

- Jang Young-gyu – bass (2019-present)
- An Yi-ho – vocals (2019-present)
- Choi Suin – vocals, keyboards (2023-present)
- Ra Seojin – vocals (2025-present)
- Park Soo-beom – vocals (2019-2020/2025-present)
- E Jae – bass (2025-present)
- Oh Hyung Suk – drums (2025-present)

Former members

- Lee Chul-hee – drums (2019-2023)
- Lee Narae – vocals (2019-2023)
- Shin Yu-jin – vocals (2019-2023)
- Kwon Song-hee – vocals, keyboards (2019-2023)
- Chun Hyo-jeong – vocals (2023-2025)
- Jeong Jung-yeop – bass (2019-2021)
- Park Jun-cheol – bass (2021-2023)
- Noddy Woo – bass (2023-2025)
- Lee Yong-jin – drums (2023-2025)

== Discography ==
Studio Albums

- SUGUNGGA (ZANPAR Inc., May 29, 2020)
- HEUNGBOGA (HIKE, November 6, 2025)

Singles & EPs

- Don't Move, I'll Snap for U featuring lIlBOI (January 22, 2021)
- Please Don't Go (February 3, 2021)
- 광자매 납신다 (Revolutionary Sisters) (March 28, 2021)
- 의심 (Suspicion) (April 24, 2021)
- Let's Live for Today (April 22, 2022)
- 새타령 (Bird) (October 13, 2024)
- Lesser Gods and Chimeras (November 5, 2024)
- Hihi Haha (December 26, 2024)
- God of Mud (February 6, 2025)
- Go Forth and Learn to Live (October 29, 2025)
- Here Comes That Crow EP (June 12, 2026) (U.S. and Canada)
