= Abandoned Love (EP) =

Abandoned Love.
- Digital cover

EP by Def.
- Released: October 17, 2022
- Genre: R&B
- Length: 19:36
- Language: Korean
- Label: 528Hz
- Producer: Def.

Def. chronology
Be Yourself (2022)	Abandoned Love. (2022)	Archive 1: Road Runner (2024)

Abandoned Love. is the fourth extended play by South Korean singer Jay B, released on October 17, 2022, under the pseudonym Def..

== Background and release ==
The release of Abandoned Love. was teased by Jay B in an interview for the October 2022 issue of Dazed Korea in which he stated that it would be an acoustic album. On sale from October 6 to 13 in limited quantities, it was released digitally on October 17 and physically on November 4. The music video for the title track, "My Abandoned Love," was released on October 18. Jay B wrote the lyrics, music, and arrangements for each track, and served as executive producer. Among the songs on Abandoned Love., "Right" was performed for the first time in early October during the Philippine leg of the singer's Tape: Press Play World Tour.

The album is related to the previous extended play released by Jay B under the pseudonym Def., Love.: while the first one talked about wanting to give oneself completely to the loved one at the moment a love begins, Abandoned Love. talks about the breakup and the desperation felt after it, and the singer worked on it thinking about how much love could ruin a person. While recording he focused on a tone that could express the emotions well and tried to reduce the instruments to a minimum to give the feeling of being "completely broken." The guitar sound at the beginning of "My Abandoned Love" was created by cutting and reassembling a part of "Sunset With You" from the EP Love..

== Critical reception ==
Abandoned Love. was listed among the best Korean albums of 2022 by Bollywood Hungama, which commented that the singer's "unique vocal capabilities" allowed him to give the lyrics "a mood that is hazy and quite peaceful," and concluded that Jay B combined feelings of grief, anger, and hurt with melodies that reach deep into the heart, penning "a heartfelt ode to a wonderful time in one's life."

It was also included by Bandwagon among the best albums of the year, calling it an "incredible follow-up" to Love., tinged with loneliness and hurt compared to the sweetness and warmth of its predecessor.

== Track listing ==
All lyrics are written by Def.; all music is composed by Wavycake, Mirror Boy and Def.

No.	Title	Length
1.	"My Bad"	3:29
2.	"Calm Down"	3:09
3.	"My Abandoned Love"	3:30
4.	"Not Easy"	3:08
5.	"Right" (맞아; Maj-a)	2:59
6.	"You Say"	3:21
Total length:		19:36

== Charts ==
Abandoned Love. debuted at #11 on the Circle Weekly Album Chart, selling 14,234 copies.

=== Weekly charts ===
Chart performance for Abandoned Love.
Chart (2022)	Peak position
South Korean Albums (Circle)	11

=== Monthly charts ===
Monthly chart performance for Abandoned Love.
Chart (2022)	Peak position
South Korean Albums (Circle)	55
