= JJ Project =

South Korean pop duo

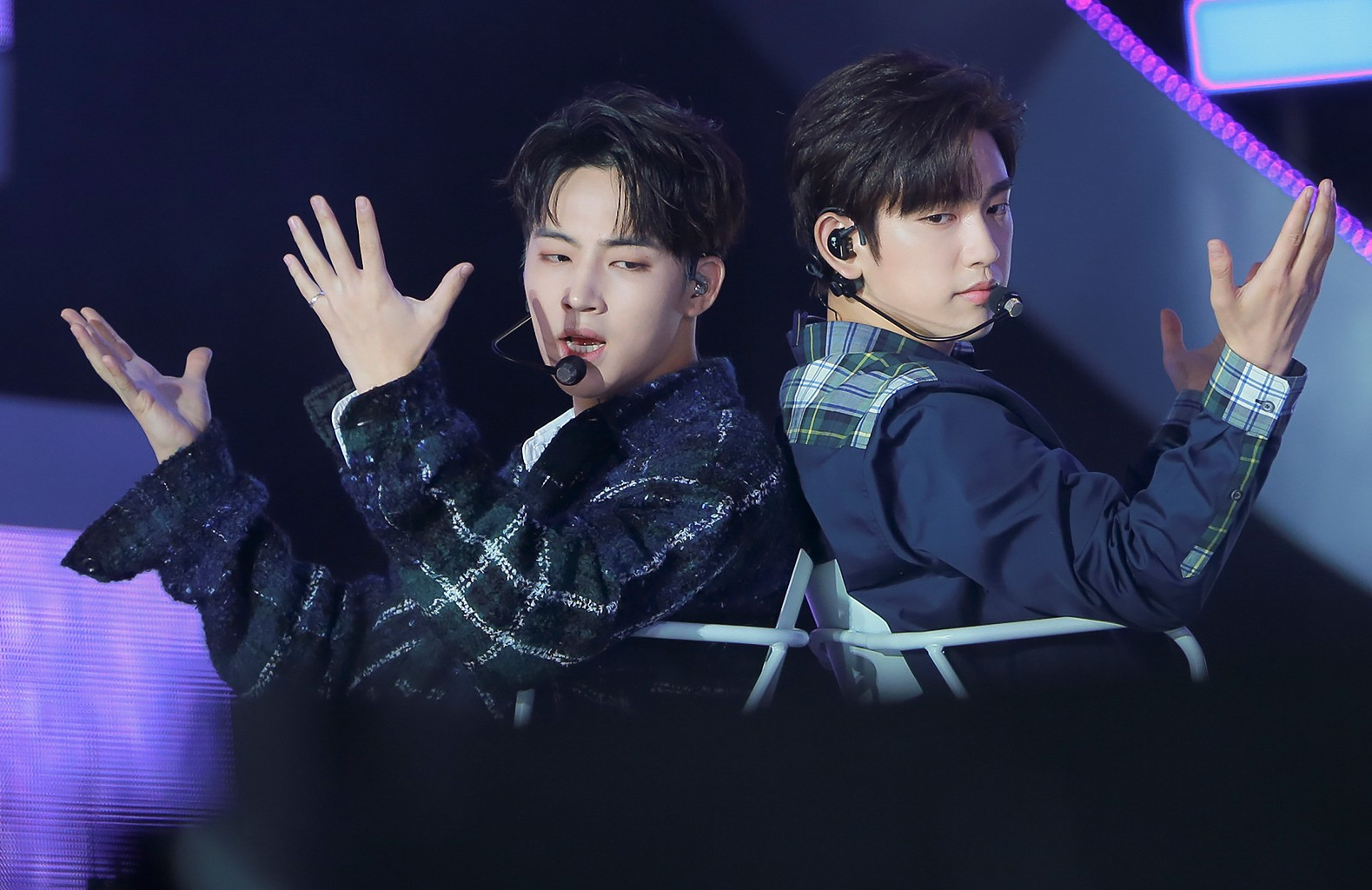
- Jay B and Jinyoung in 2017 at Inkigayo Super Concert

Background information
- Origin: Seoul, South Korea
- Genres: K-pop
- Years active: 2012; 2017
- Label: JYP
- Members: Jay B; Jinyoung

JJ Project (Korean: JJ 프로젝트) is a South Korean duo, consisting of Jay B and Jinyoung. They were formed by JYP Entertainment and released their debut single "Bounce" in May 2012. They later debuted as a part of Got7 in January 2014.

== Career ==
In 2009, Lim Jae-beom and Park Jin-young successfully auditioned for JYP Entertainment and became trainees. In January 2012, they were part of the KBS drama Dream High 2: in order not to be confused with the singers of the same name (Yim Jae-beom and J. Y. Park), they adopted the stage names of JB and Jr. respectively, later switching to Jay B and Jinyoung. They also lent their voices for the soundtrack of Dream High 2. On May 8, JYP Entertainment announced the new duo JJ Project, which debuted with the single album Bounce on May 20, 2012, ranking #8 on the Gaon Album Chart. The music video for the homonymous title track was released through their official YouTube account and reached over 1 million views on YouTube in 2 days. "Bounce" was produced by J.Y. Park and is a dance song which combines hip hop, rock and electronica in a new genre called "hip-rock tronica", and gained popularity for the free-spirited and cheerful performance. The single album also features "Hooked" (꽂혔어), a collaboration with Miss A's Suzy titled "Before This Song Ends" (이 노래가 끝나기 전에), and the instrumental version of "Bounce". Promotions started on May 24 on M! Countdown and lasted one month.

On June 26, 2012, the duo was invited to record an own rendition of "Na Na Na" by Yoo Seung-jun to be performed on the second season of MBC's music program MM Choice. Between June and October, they also starred in SBS MTV reality show Diary for 45 episodes.

On July 7, they opened Wonder Girls' Wonder World Tour in Seoul, which was held in front of 5,000 fans at Jamsil Indoor Gymnasium. They were the opening act for the September 8 stop in Singapore, too, where they performed "Bounce" and "Hooked", and later joined Hyerim for her solo stage. In August 2012, JJ Project took part in JYP Nation concert, which was held at the Olympic Park Gymnasium of Seoul on August 4, and at Yoyogi National Gymnasium of Tokyo on August 18 and 19. The shows attracted an audience of 10,000 and 36,000 people, respectively. On November 25, they performed at "M-LIVE MO.A in Vietnam", a global concert held in Ho Chi Minh to celebrate the 20th anniversary of the establishment of diplomatic relations between South Korea and Vietnam.

JJ Project earned 1.25 billion won over the year from their activities in the music field, and endorsement deals with LG's teen cosmetic line nana's B, clothing brand TBJ, and Reebok.

In April 2013, the duo appeared once again as actors for the MBC's drama When a Man Falls in Love. While they were preparing for their second album, they were reintegrated into JYPE's new boy band project group, and on January 16, 2014, they debuted as members of Got7.

On July 31, 2017, they released Verse 2, an EP of self-composed, self-written songs about the anxieties of youth. At the same time, they held a photo exhibition. Verse 2 charted at number two on the Gaon Album Chart and the Billboard World Albums chart, and debuted at #29 on the Oricon Albums Chart in Japan. Between August and September, they performed at KCON LA and Inkigayo's Super Concert in Daejeon. At the end of the year, Verse 2 was chosen as the fifth best K-pop album of 2017 by Billboard and was nominated in the album division at the Golden Disc Awards; JJ Project also got a nomination for the popularity award. In 2019, Verse 2 was included in the list of Billboard's 25 greatest K-pop album of the 2010s.

On January 19, 2021, following the expiration of their contract, they left JYP Entertainment. The duo performed their title songs "Bounce" and "Tomorrow, Today" on May 2–3, 2025 during Got7's Nestfest concert in Rajamangala Stadium.

== Discography ==
=== Extended plays ===
Title	Album details	Peak chart positions				Sales
Title	Album details	KOR	JPN	US Heat	US World	Sales
Verse 2	Released: July 31, 2017; Label: JYP Entertainment; Format: CD, digital download	2	29	9	2	KOR: 120,673; JPN: 3,823; US: 1,000

=== Single albums ===
Title	Album details	Peak chart positions	Sales
Title	Album details	KOR	Sales
Bounce	Released: May 20, 2012; Label: JYP Entertainment; Format: CD, digital download; Track list: 1. "Bounce"; 2. "Hooked" (꽂혔어); 3. "Before This Song Ends (feat. Miss A's Suzy)" (이 노래가 끝나기 전에); 4. "Bounce (Inst.)"	8	KOR: 12,833

=== Singles ===
Title	Year	Peak positions		Sales	Album
Title	Year	KOR	US World	Sales	Album
"Bounce"	2012	30	14	KOR: 238,668	Bounce
"Tomorrow, Today" (내일, 오늘)	2017	27	9	KOR: 48,265	Verse 2

== Filmography ==
=== Variety shows ===
Year	Title	TV Network	Ref.
2012	Real JJ Project	YouTube	
2012	Diary	SBS MTV	
2017	JJ Diary the Moments	YouTube, V Live	

== Awards and nominations ==
Name of the award ceremony, year presented, category, nominee(s) of the award, and the result of the nomination
Award ceremony	Year	Category	Nominee(s)/work(s)	Result	Ref.
Golden Disc Awards	2018	Album Division (Album Bonsang)	Verse 2	Nominated	
Golden Disc Awards	2018	Genie Music Popularity Award	JJ Project	Nominated	
Golden Disc Awards	2018	Global Popularity Award	JJ Project	Nominated	
Seoul Music Awards	2013	New Artist Award	Bounce	Nominated	
Seoul Music Awards	2013	Popularity Award	Bounce	Nominated	

== See also ==
- Got7 discography
- List of awards and nominations received by Got7
