= Feel the Rhythm of Korea =

Tourism campaign in South Korea

Feel the Rhythm of Korea is a marketing campaign run by the Korea Tourism Organization, a government agency of South Korea. Each of its videos showcases one or more locations in the country. Many of the videos feature modern adaptations of traditional Korean folk music, while media personalities, singers, and dancers perform in iconic or scenic locations.

Its first season of videos ran between 2020 and 2021. Its second season began in September 2021 and ran until 2022. A mini-series featuring songs selected by K-pop group BTS was released in October to November 2022.

The campaign has been met with acclaim for its mix of traditional and modern elements of Korean culture, and has accumulated hundreds of millions of views total across various platforms. The first video alone accumulated over 200 million views within a few months of its release.

The full songs composed exclusively for the advertising campaign have also been released. In September 2021, the album Feel the Rhythm of Korea Part 1 and the two-track single Feel the Rhythm of Korea Part 2 were released.

== List of videos ==
Location	Date	Featuring	Notes	Ref
Seoul	July 29, 2020	Leenalchi – Music Ambiguous Dance Company – Dance	Pop cover of the Pansori song Tiger is Coming	
Busan	July 29, 2020	Leenalchi – Music Ambiguous Dance Company – Dance	Pansori-style pop song "A Fish Map" (어류도감)	
Jeonju	July 29, 2020	Leenalchi – Music Ambiguous Dance Company – Dance	Pansori-style pop song "Catch a Rabbit" (좌우나졸)	
Andong	October 13, 2020	Leenalchi – Music Ambiguous Dance Company – Dance	Pop cover of part of the Pansori story "Sugungga"	
Mokpo	October 13, 2020	Leenalchi – Music Ambiguous Dance Company – Dance	Pop cover of the folk song "Pungnyeonga"	
Gangneung	October 13, 2020	Leenalchi – Music Ambiguous Dance Company – Dance	Pop cover of part of the Pansori story "Sugungga"	
Incheon	March 21, 2021	Leenalchi – Music Ambiguous Dance Company, cast of 2 Days & 1 Night (Note: Kim Jong-min, Kim Seon-ho, Ravi, Yeon Jung-hoon) – Dance	Pop cover of part of the Pansori story "Sugungga"	
Busan & Tongyeong	September 2, 2021	Sogumm – Music		
Daegu	September 2, 2021	Big Naughty – Music GroovyRoom – Music production Emet Sound – Dance	Hip-hop cover of folk song "Kwaejina Ching Ching Nane"	
Seoul	September 2, 2021	PH-1 – Music GroovyRoom – Music production	Hip-hop cover of Pansori song "Sarang Ga"	
Suncheon	September 2, 2021	Trade L – Music GroovyRoom – Music production	Hip-hop cover of folk song "Sae Taryeong"	
Gyeongju & Andong	September 2, 2021	Woo Won-jae – Music Sogumm – Featured Gray – Music production	Hip-hop cover of folk song "Ganggangsullae"	
Gangneung & Yangyang	September 2, 2021	Jay B – Music GroovyRoom – Music production	R&B cover of folk song Niliria	
Seoul	September 2, 2021	GEMINI – Music GroovyRoom – Music production	Hip-hop cover of folk song "Arirang"	
Seosan	September 2, 2021	Woodie Gochild – Music GroovyRoom – Music production	Hip-hop cover of folk song "Ong Heya", video reference to franchise Mad Max	
Mokpo	November 3, 2021	Mommy Son – Music Coe – Music production	Hip-hop cover of folk song "Pungnyeongga" (풍년가)	
Jeonju	November 3, 2021	Wonstein – Music Coup D'état – Music production	Hip-hop cover of folk song "Taepyeong Ga"	
Yeosu	May 20, 2022	Lee Hyun, Solji – Music	Orchestral song and video reference the Pirates of the Caribbean franchise, as well as turtle ships	
Pyeongchang	May 20, 2022		Piano cover of "My Grandfather's Clock"	
Incheon	May 20, 2022	Lee Hyun – Music		

=== Feel the Rhythm of Korea with BTS ===
A mini-series was released in October and November 2022 that featured songs chosen to represent each location by Suga and Jimin of the K-pop group BTS.

Location	Featuring	Notes	Ref
Busan	Cho Yong-pil – Music	1972 blues song "Come Back to Busan Port"	
Daejeon	Songgolmae – Music	1982 rock song "You, I Happened to Meet"	
Pohang	Drunken Tiger – Music	1999 rap song "This is Hiphop!"	
Jeju	Park Sung-yeon – Music	2016 jazz song "The Wind is Blowing", Park died in 2020 and was known as the "Godmother of Jazz Music", and opened the first jazz-only club in the country in 1978.	

== Success and acclaim ==
Many of its videos have garnered dozens of millions of views each. The July 2020 first video in the series, covering the capital city Seoul and featuring pansori–hip hop fusion music by Leenalchi and dance by the Ambiguous Dance Company (Korean: 앰비규어스댄스컴퍼니), received over 200 million views across several platforms by October 2020. The video led to a boom in popularity for both Leenalchi and the Ambiguous Dance Company, with the latter going on to collaborate with British band Coldplay in their music video for the song "Higher Power".

An October 2022 video covering the city of Busan that featured K-pop group BTS received four million views on its first day, and surpassed 100 million views by December of that year. The video was also played on billboard ads in the United States, Britain, Singapore, Thailand, Japan, and Qatar.

Videos in the campaign have been praised by international and domestic observers. Lebawit Lily Girma of Skift called it a "clever, energy-packed message for travelers as to what makes the destination stand out from a cultural and outdoor standpoint, whether it’s Seoul’s vibrant fashion-clad streets and residents of all ages, or Korea’s surfing towns and islets contrasting against its rural daily life scenes".

In March 2021, the head of the KTO and organizer of the campaign Oh Chung-seop (오충섭) received a presidential award in recognition of the success of the campaign. By the time of the award, the videos had received over 600 million views on YouTube and Facebook.
