= Love (Jay B EP) =

Love.
- Digital cover

EP by Def.
- Released: January 26, 2022
- Genre: R&B
- Length: 19:03
- Language: Korean
- Label: 528Hz
- Producer: Def.

Def. chronology
SOMO:Fume (2021)	Love. (2022)	Be Yourself (2022)

Love. is the second extended play by South Korean singer Jay B, released on January 26, 2022, under the pseudonym Def.

== Background and release ==
Jay B announced the release of his first EP under the pseudonym Def. on December 31, 2021, by posting the title of the album through an Instagram story. Love. went on sale for the pre-order period only, from January 5 to January 12, and was released on January 26 under Warner Music Korea together with a music video for the title track "Sunset With You".

The record is about love and the emotions it brings along; it's opened by "Again", an intimate and sensual R&B collaboration that sees rapper Leon rapping in two languages. "Why?" combines synth and bass beats with an electro-acoustic guitar riff, while the third track, "I Just Wanna Know", gives jazz and R&B vibes, with the cello and bass in the background. "Like a Fool" is the singer's third collaboration with producer and soloist Junny. In "Want U", he alternates a high tempo in the chorus and a lower mid-range tempo in the bridge. Love. ends with "Sunset With You", a lo-fi song with a dreamy atmosphere and soft percussion in the background, which tells the story of a couple happy with their relationship.

== Critical reception ==
Nandini Iyengar from Bollywood Hungama commented "The album, from start to end, is a treat for those who like indie and alternate beats, interspersed with R&B." Bandwagon listed it among the best albums and EPs of the first half of 2022, stating: "Lyrically, it feels like an honest diary about love and what it's like navigating that complicated emotion, like someone actually going through all its ups and downs in real time. While sonically, it's just a world of lo-fi and R&B that you just want to swim in."

It was featured at #13 on the list of the best Korean hip hop and R&B albums of 2022 according to Rolling Stone India, which felt that, in Love., "Def. tastefully explores the magic of romance with the right amount of sensuality", taking control of listeners' senses through vocal orchestration, and observing that the listening experience was elevated by the fluid progress of the tracks.

== Commercial performance ==
Love. sold just over 24,000 copies on the day of release for both the Hanteo Chart, and the Gaon Chart, and around 41,000 in the first week according to Hanteo. It has overall sold 52,724 copies in January for the Gaon Chart, ranking 18th.

It debuted in third place on the Gaon Album Chart in the week January 23–29, 2022, while "Sunset With You" entered the Gaon Digital Chart at 152 and was third on the Gaon Download Chart.

== Track listing ==
No.	Title	Lyrics	Music	Arrangement	Length
1.	"Again" (featuring Leon)	Def.; Leon	Royal Dive; Def.; Mirror Boy; Saimon; Leon	Royal Dive; Mirror Boy; Saimon; Def.	3:16
2.	"Why?" (왜그래?; Wae geurae?)	Def.	Royal Dive; Def.; Saimon; Mirror Boy	Royal Dive; Saimon; Mirror Boy; Def.	3:13
3.	"I Just Wanna Know"	Def.	Mirror Boy; Def.; Royal Dive; Saimon	Mirror Boy; Royal Dive; Saimon; Def.	2:52
4.	"Like a Fool" (바보같이; Babogach-i – featuring Junny)	Def.; Junny	Mirror Boy; Def.; Saimon; Royal Dive; Junny	Mirror Boy; Saimon; Royal Dive; Def.	3:27
5.	"Want U"	Def.	Saimon; Def.; Royal Dive; Mirror Boy	Saimon; Royal Dive; Mirror Boy; Def.	2:52
6.	"Sunset With You"	Def.	Saimon; Def.; Mirror Boy; Royal Dive	Saimon; Mirror Boy; Royal Dive; Def.	3:23
Total length:					19:03

== Personnel ==
- Def. – lyrics, composition, arrangements, production, creative direction
- Mirror Boy – composition, arrangements, mixing
- Royal Dive – composition, arrangements
- Saimon – composition, arrangements
- Leon – lyrics (track 1), composition (track 1)
- Junny – lyrics (track 4), composition (track 4)
- 528 Hz – recording (track 6)
- Boost Knob (Park Gyeong-seon) – mastering

== Charts ==
Chart performance for Love.
Chart (2022)	Peak position
South Korean Albums (Gaon)	3
