= Jay B =

South Korean singer (born 1994)

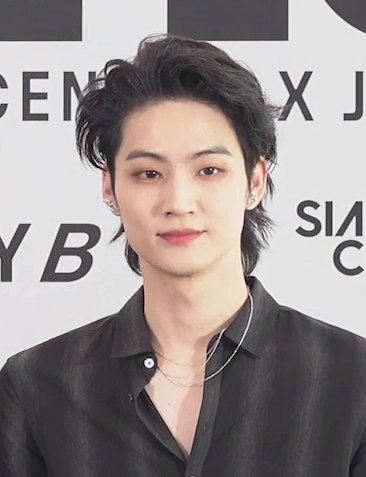
- Jay B in 2025
- Born: Lim Jae-beom; January 6, 1994 (age 32); Siheung, South Korea
- Other name: Def.
- Education: Konkuk University
- Occupations: Singer; songwriter; actor
- Years active: 2012–present
- Musical career
- Also known as: Defsoul; Def.
- Genres: K-pop; R&B
- Instrument: Vocals
- Labels: JYP; H1ghr; CDNZA Records; Mauve Company; 528Hz
- Member of: Got7; JJ Project; Jus2
- Website: Official website

Korean name
- Hangul: 임재범
- RR: Im Jaebeom
- MR: Im Chaebŏm

Signature
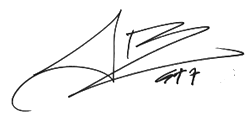

Lim Jae-beom (Korean: 임재범; born January 6, 1994), known professionally as Jay B (제이비; stylized in all caps) or Def. (데프), and formerly JB, is a South Korean singer, songwriter, and actor.

After starring in the drama series Dream High 2 in 2012, he debuted as a singer first in South Korean duo JJ Project, then, two years later, in boy band Got7, for which he serves as the leader. Aside from JJ Project and Got7, is also a member of Jus2, and part of R&B/soul crew Offshore. He is the founder and creative leader of independent music label 528Hz.

== Biography ==
Lim Jae-beom was born in Siheung, Gyeonggi Province, and grew up in Goyang. When he was seven, after watching g.o.d. perform, he developed the dream of becoming a singer. He started b-boying in his third year of middle school after failing a school test, dancing with friends at Ilsan, Paju, Boramae and Jeongbalsan station, and taking part in competitions. As a b-boy, he used the stage name Defsoul, taking Musiq Soulchild's "Just Friends" music video as inspiration. In 2009 he was scouted by JYP Entertainment at a b-boy competition: he was not interested in attending the audition, but his father pushed him to do so. He subsequently passed the open audition, winning first place with Jinyoung over 10,000 applicants. He became interested in musical composition and hip hop culture as a b-boy, but at the beginning of his idol training, he thought that learning to sing was meaningless, and concentrated only on dancing; however, after listening to D'Angelo, he started singing and composing his first songs.

== Career ==
=== 2011–2014: Debut and career beginnings ===
In 2011, Jay B was cast in the role of Jang Woo-jae in the television drama Dream High 2, which began airing on January 30, 2012, on KBS for 16 episodes. In order not to be confused with singer Yim Jae-beom, he adopted the stage name of JB. In May 2012, he and fellow trainee Jinyoung debuted as the duo JJ Project with the single album Bounce. Their official music video for the title track "Bounce" was released on May 19.

On March 11, 2013, it was announced that he would be appearing as Seo Mi-joon on MBC's new drama When a Man Falls in Love. On January 16, 2014, the two members of JJ Project debuted as part of a seven-member boy band called Got7.

=== 2015–2020: Solo activities and first photo exhibition ===
Jay B performing at SBS Gayo Daejeon, December 2016

In 2015, he played the lead role in Dream Knight, a web drama, as a superhero version of himself, alongside his fellow Got7 members, featuring actress Song Ha-yoon as the female lead role.

In 2016, with the extended play Flight Log: Departure, his self-written songs started being included in Got7's album under the pseudonym Defsoul or Def.

In 2018, together with group mate Yugyeom, he participated in the art collaboration project Collaboran for carbonated mineral water brand Perrier with American multimedia artist Ben Jones. The creation process was later revealed through a reality show in May.

On March 5, 2019, he and Yugyeom debuted as Jus2, a sub-unit of Got7, with their EP Focus and its lead single "Focus on Me". In December 2019, he launched the JB Collection, a summer-themed clothing line in collaboration with Represent, which went on sale for two weeks and sold 35,940 items.

He also released two compilation extended plays with the Offshore crew, Scene #1 on June 24, 2019, and Scene #2 on March 26, 2020. As Def., he held his first photo exhibition named Alone from October 6 to 12, 2020, in Seoul.

=== 2021: Departure from JYP Entertainment and SOMO:Fume ===
On January 19, 2021, following the expiration of his contract, he left JYP Entertainment. With the release of Got7's single "Encore" on February 20, he started using the new stage name Jay B.

On May 11, 2021, he signed an exclusive contract with H1ghr Music, debuting as a solo artist three days later by releasing the single "Switch It Up" featuring rapper Sokodomo, which entered at number 12 on the Gaon Download Chart. The R&B track was self-written and self-composed by Jay B with Jay Park and Cha Cha Malone, who also produced it, and talks about love, while the title conveys that his life is going to change. On May 25, 2021, Jay B became the first Korean soloist to enter the Billboard R&B Digital Song Sales Chart, debuting at number six. He also became the third Korean soloist to chart on Billboard R&B/Hip Hop Digital Song Sales Chart with "Switch It Up" entering at number 18.

On July 30, 2021, he became the first cover star for the launching of TMRW Magazine Korea. The 100-page magazine had been curated with Jay B himself and featured an exclusive interview, photoshoot and his own film photographies. In August, he appeared on MBC's singing competition show King of Mask Singer as "Toad's House" on episode 319. On August 26, 2021, his first EP, SOMO:Fume and the music video of the title track "B.T.W (Feat. Jay Park)" were released both digitally and physically. As part of the album promotions, Jay B held his first solo global fan meeting, "SOMO:Fume, Style of My Own:Fume", on September 25 through online platform Bbangya TV, while the official merchandise launched to commemorate the release of the EP, which went on sale for one week from September 2, was sold out in five days. An offline pop-up store selling additional items was subsequently opened in Seoul for two weeks from October 1, 2021.

In September, he participated in "Feel the Rhythm of Korea 2", a promotional campaign sponsored by the Ministry of Culture, Sports and Tourism and the Korea Tourism Organization, for which he sang "I'm Surfin", a re-interpretation of traditional song "Niliria" (늴리리야; Nuilliri-ya), which was released on September 3 along a music video. On September 27, Jay B launched his second clothing line with Represent, "Live Without Regrets", under his moniker Def. On October 18, he collaborated with Italian singer-songwriter and producer Fudasca on the single "Is It A Dream?", while in November, he starred in the new Adidas Originals winter campaign, "Open Spirit", along with Blackpink.

=== 2022–2025: Further music releases and world tours ===
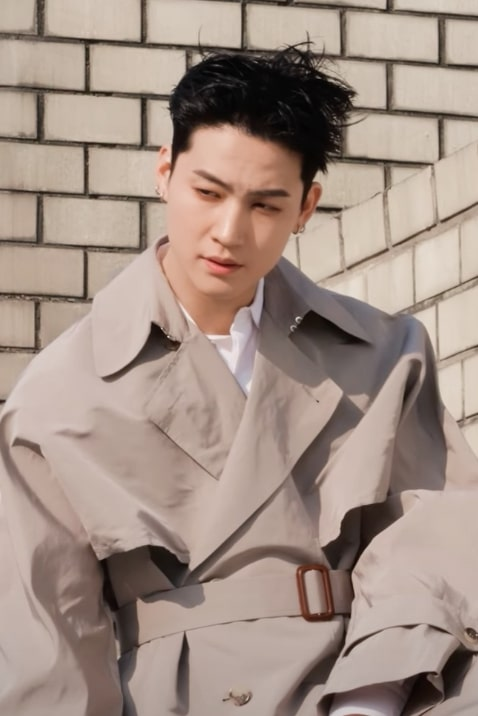
Jay B for Marie Claire Korea, December 2022

On January 26, 2022, Jay B released his first physical extended play as Def., Love., which was listed among the best albums and EPs of the first half of the year by Bandwagon, and named one of the best Korean hip hop and R&B albums of 2022 according to Rolling Stone India.

On June 18, 2022, he held the Nostalgic concert at Jangchung Arena to commemorate ten years since his debut: the event was followed by more than 10,000 people both online and offline. On July 25, 2022, the exclusive contract between Jay B and H1ghr Music expired and he signed with CDNZA Records. His first release under the new label was the single "Rocking Chair", which he first performed at the Nostalgic concert, and that was chosen by Bandwagon as one of the best songs of the year.

On September 21, Jay B released his second EP Be Yourself, and three days later kicked off the Tape: Press Pause World Tour in Seoul, which continued in Asia, Latin America and Europe for the rest of the year and concluded in January 2023 with three encore performances in Bangkok and Seoul. On the occasion of the two Thai stops in October, which saw the singer performing in front of 24,000 people at a sold-out Impact Exhibition Hall, Jay B held a pop-up exhibition from October 17 to November 15 at the Siam Center, presenting ideas and inspirations behind the Be Yourself album. In the meantime, he released his second EP as Def., which was titled Abandoned Love..

In February 2023, ahead of his enlistment as a social service worker, he released the special album Seasonal Hiatus, featuring three new songs. In April, he terminated his contract with CDNZA Records, and the following October 6, Mauve Company announced that Jay B had signed an exclusive contract with them.

Following his discharge on November 1, 2024, Jay B released his first full album Archive 1: [Road Runner] on November 27, followed by the concert Tape: Re Load in Seoul and Bangkok. Along with the Thai concert, he held a second exhibition at the Siam Center from January 13 to February 3, 2025. Through 2025, he toured Asia, the USA and South America with the Tape: Re Load World Tour, which ended in November with encore performances in Thailand and South Korea. His contract with Mauve Company came to an end on December 2.

=== 2026–present: TR.EE ===
After signing with his independent label 528Hz in April 2026, Jay B released his third EP TR.EE on June 10. On June 20 and 21 he held the first two stops of the Tape: Roots concert at Yes24 Live Hall in Seoul; he then toured Bangkok, Taipei, Hong Kong, and Tokyo from July to early September. The North American leg was held in the second half of September. In October, he released Chptr. 1, the first installment of a series of singles, featuring "Honeydew" and "Sweetie".

== Personal life ==
=== Health ===
Jay B was diagnosed with clinical depression as well as panic disorder, and has since taken prescribed medication for them.

In 2016, he was unable to participate in several Got7's Fly Tour concerts and a M!Countdown performance due to a spinal disc injury. He returned for the Fly in Singapore concert at the Suntec Singapore Convention & Exhibition Centre on June 24, two months after the injury.

=== Family and education ===
During his younger years, his parents divorced due to his father's drinking problem, and his mother later remarried. His family runs a tomato farm in Ilsan.

Jay B majored in film at Konkuk University.

== Artistry ==
Jay B has cited D'Angelo as the artist that inspired him to take on singing and music composition. He also likes Ray Charles, James Brown, and R&B and soul music from South America. Although he has listened to a variety of different genres to produce music for Got7, for his solo work he prefers R&B, influenced by soul and lo-fi. Regarding his second persona, Def., he has described it as a way to release the music he really likes and experiment with songs not catering to the general public. Def. tends to create "something very up close and personal ... in the R&B, alternate pop and indie genres". Vogue Korea commented that "While Jay B in Got7 is as powerful and refreshing as the moment when you open a can of soda, Def. is as mellow as a dawn after a dewy night". His music blends "emotional honesty, genre experimentation, and sophisticated R&B influences".

To write lyrics, he first senses the song's mood, then thinks about past events, current experiences, or things he has seen in movies or read in books.

== Philanthropy ==
On November 24, 2017, it was revealed that he had donated ₩10 million (equivalent to ₩11.94 million or US$8,909.9 in 2025) to the Pohang Earthquake Relief Fund under his real name. On February 27, 2020, he donated ₩10 million (equivalent to ₩11.66 million or US$8,700.07 in 2025) to the Hope Bridge Disaster Relief Association in light of the COVID-19 pandemic.

After being appointed an ambassador for ChildFund Korea (Green Umbrella Children's Foundation) in 2018, Jay B has continued to donate to the organization over the years to help underprivileged children. In 2021 he donated the profits from the sales of his SOMO:Fume merchandise and his Def. Represent collection to support families in need caused by COVID-19 and abused children, reaching ₩100 million (equivalent to ₩113.76 million or US$84,880.15 in 2025) and thus being appointed as an official member of the Green Noble Club in December.

On January 18, 2022, he donated ₩50 million (equivalent to ₩54.13 million or US$40,384.69 in 2025) for the Goyang Love Sharing Hope campaign to establish an emergency support system for gaps in welfare in Goyang. On February 10, 2023, the Green Umbrella Children's Foundation announced that he had donated ₩60 million (equivalent to ₩62.7 million or US$46,778.78 in 2025) to help children around the world and that the donation would be used mainly for the victims of the 2023 Turkey–Syria earthquake. He donated another ₩60 million on November 29, 2025 to the Green Umbrella Santa Expedition campaign.

== Discography ==
=== Studio albums ===
List of studio albums, with selected chart positions and sales figures
Title	Details	Peak chart positions	Sales
Title	Details	KOR	Sales
Archive 1: [Road Runner]	Released: November 27, 2024; Label: Mauve Company; Formats: CD, digital download, streaming	13	KOR: 43,308
2018.12.25 (as Def.)	Released: September 21, 2026; Label: 528Hz; Formats: CD, digital download, streaming	14	KOR: 2,770

=== Extended plays ===
List of extended plays, with selected chart positions and sales figures
Title	Details	Peak chart positions		Sales
Title	Details	KOR	JPN	Sales
SOMO:Fume	Released: August 26, 2021; Label: H1ghr Music; Formats: CD, digital download, streaming	5	33	KOR: 99,367; JPN: 1,268 (Phy.)
Love. (as Def.)	Released: January 26, 2022; Label: 528Hz; Formats: CD, digital download, streaming	3	—	KOR: 52,724
Be Yourself	Released: September 21, 2022; Label: CDNZA Records; Formats: CD, digital download, streaming	7	—	KOR: 51,453
Abandoned Love. (as Def.)	Released: October 17, 2022; Label: 528Hz; Formats: CD, digital download, streaming	11	—	KOR: 14,234
TR.EE	Release date: June 10, 2026; Label: 528Hz; Formats: CD, digital download, streaming	8	—	KOR: 41,343
"—" denotes releases that did not chart.

=== Single albums ===
List of single albums, with selected chart positions and sales figures
Title	Details	Peak chart positions	Sales
Title	Details	KOR	Sales
Seasonal Hiatus	Released: February 14, 2023; Label: CDNZA Records; Formats: CD, digital download, streaming; Tracklist: 1. "One Moment" (잠시만); 2. "Whiskey"; 3. "Wonder"	25	KOR: 11,429
Chptr. 1	Released: October 27, 2026; Label: 528Hz; Formats: CD, digital download, streaming; Tracklist: 1. "Honeydew"; 2. "Sweetey"	12	KOR: 18,882

=== Mixtapes ===
Title	Album details	Track listing
1/? vol. 1	Released: December 31, 2016; Label: –; Format: Streaming	1. "Holic"; 2. "Don't Worry"; 3. "Sin" feat. Jomalxne; 4. "Lost"; 5. "Bad Habit" feat. Jomalxne
1/? vol. 2	Released: January 22, 2018; Label: –; Format: Streaming	1. "Intro"; 2. "Think of You"; 3. "Channel" feat. Jeebanoff, Jomalxne; 4. "Don't Touch Me"; 5. "Pray"; 6. "Outro"
1/? vol. 2 (Remix)	Released: April 30, 2018; Label: –; Format: Streaming	1. "Don't Touch Me (Deepshower Remix)"; 2. "Channel (BRLLNT Remix)"; 3. "Think of You (Plan8 Remix)"
1/? vol. 3	Released: November 10, 2018; Label: –; Format: Streaming	1. "Sometime"; 2. "Be With You"; 3. "Don't Care"; 4. "Island" feat. Jomalxne; 5. "Blind"
1/? vol. 4	Released: August 4, 2019; Label: –; Format: Streaming	1. "Something Special"; 2. "Desire"; 3. "Deeper"; 4. "Runaway"; 5. "Stopline" feat. Rick Bridges
1/? vol. 5	Released: October 28, 2019; Label: –; Format: Streaming	1. "Ring"; 2. "Diary"; 3. "Nothing"; 4. "Curiosi"; 5. "Come Back to Me"

=== Singles ===
Title	Year	Peak chart positions	Sales	Album
Title	Year	KOR	Sales	Album
As lead artist
"Rainy"	2018	—	—N/a	Hyena on the Keyboard Part. 4
"Switch It Up" (feat. Sokodomo)	2021	— (Note: "Switch It Up" did not enter the Gaon Digital Chart, but peaked at no. 12 on the Gaon Download Chart.)	—N/a	SOMO:Fume
"B.T.W" (feat. Jay Park)	2021	130	—N/a	SOMO:Fume
"Fame" (feat. Junny)	2021	— (Note: "Fame" did not enter the Gaon Digital Chart, but peaked at no. 87 on the Gaon Download Chart.)	—N/a	SOMO:Fume
"Is It a Dream?" (Def. and Fudasca)	2021	—	—N/a	Non-album single
"Sunset with You" (Def.)	2022	152	—N/a	Love.
"Hello 2.0 (Legends Only)" (James Reid, Jay B and ØZI)	2022	—	—N/a	Non-album singles
"BRB" (Cha Cha Malone, GroovyRoom, Haon, Sik-K, Trade L, Big Naughty, PH-1, Park Hyeon-jin, Jay Park, Jay B)	2022	—	—N/a	Non-album singles
"Lone Wolf (3:00 AM)" (풀리지 않는 고민 (3:00 am)) (Skinny Brown, Kim Seungmin, Jay B, Big Naughty)	2022	—	—N/a	Listen-Up EP.3
"Rocking Chair" (흔들의자)	2022	—	—N/a	Non-album single
"Go Up"	2022	— (Note: "Go Up" did not enter the Circle Digital Chart, but peaked at no. 24 on the Circle Download Chart.)	—N/a	Be Yourself
"Will Spring Come?" (봄이 올까?) (Def.)	2022	—	—N/a	Non-album single
"About You" (Soulbysel, Def.)	2023	—	—N/a	Soulbysel Compilation 04
"Crash"	2024	—	—N/a	Archive 1: [Road Runner]
"Cloud Nine"	2024	—	—N/a	Archive 1: [Road Runner]
"Layback"	2026	—	—N/a	TR.EE
As featured artist
"Just Because" (그냥 한번) (Baek A-yeon feat. JB of Got7)	2016	12	KOR: 185,203	Non-album single
"Hush" (Primary feat. JB of Got7)	2017	99	KOR: 24,686	Pop
"Celebrate" (Jomalxne feat. Yonko, Def.)	2017	—	—N/a	$ummertime Mixtape
"Higher" (Deepshower feat. JB)	2018	—	—N/a	Colors
"Callin'" (Jeebanoff feat. Def.)	2020	—	—N/a	Good Thing. (Remix)
"Dream" (꿈) (Wavycake and Ovus feat. Def.)	2020	—	—N/a	REALusion
"In December (Sad Night)" (12월엔 (Sad Night)) ($ün feat. Def.)	2020	—	—N/a	White
"Memory" (s/s feat. Def.)	2021	—	—N/a	Seesaw
"P.S". (Mirani feat. Jay B)	2021	—	—N/a	Uptown Girl
"Thought of You" (생각했어) (Ourealgoat feat. Jay B)	2021	—	—N/a	Non-album single
"Nostalgia" (Junny feat. Jay B)	2021	—	—N/a	Nostalgia
"Night" (NXPS feat. Def.)	2022	—	—N/a	Non-album single
"Windy Day" (바람이 나를 안을 때) (Bigone feat. Jay B)	2022	—	—N/a	BIGONEISTHENAME
"I'll Be Fine" (SMMT feat. Jay B)	2022	—	—N/a	Mr. Hollywood
"GZRGH" (꺼지라고해) (Jomalxne feat. Jay B)	2022	—	—N/a	Sky Walker
As part of Offshore
"Surfin" (Mirror Boy feat. Def., Jomalxne)	2019	—	—N/a	Scene #1
"Laze" (Roseinpeace feat. Def., Jomalxne)	2019	—	—N/a	Scene #1
"Play" (Roseinpeace feat. Jomalxne, Def., HNMR)	2019	—	—N/a	Scene #1
"Simple" (Def.)	2020	—	—N/a	Scene #2
"Smoke" (연기) (Def., Jomalxne)	2020	—	—N/a	Scene #2
"Take a Walk" (iHwak, HNMR, Def.)	2020	—	—N/a	Scene #2
"Sweet Dream" (Def.)	2020	—	—N/a	Cut #1
"Just Stay" (Def., Junny)	2020	—	—N/a	Cut #1
"Cold Night" (Def., HNMR, Jomalxne)	2021	—	—N/a	Scene #3
"Just Stay" (Remastered) (Def., Junny)	2021	—	—N/a	Scene #3
"Call Me" (Jomalxne, Def.)	2021	—	—N/a	Scene #3
"Sweet Dream" (Remastered) (Def.)	2021	—	—N/a	Scene #3
"Favorite" (Def., Junny, iHwak, Royal Dive)	2023	—	—N/a	Scene #4
"Bada" (Def., Leon, Mirror Boy)	2023	—	—N/a	Scene #4
"Hell of a Life" (iHwak, Def., Junny, Mirror Boy)	2023	—	—N/a	Scene #4
Soundtrack appearances
"New Dreaming" (with Park Seo-joon)	2012	—	—N/a	Dream High 2 OST
"Together" (with Park Ji-yeon)	2012	—	—N/a	Dream High 2 OST
"Forever Love"	2015	—	—N/a	Dream Knight OST
"U&I" (with Jackson Wang)	2017	—	—N/a	The Package OST
"U&I (Chinese Version)" (with Jackson Wang)	2017	—	—N/a	The Package OST
"Be With You"	2019	—	—N/a	A Day Before Us Zero OST
"Dive Into You"	2022	— (Note: "Dive Into You" did not enter the Gaon Digital Chart, but peaked at no. 120 on the Gaon Download Chart.)	—N/a	Crazy Love OST
"Closer" (with Youngjae)	2022	—	—N/a	Good Job OST
"Velvet Trigger"	2025	—	—N/a	Exchange 4 OST
"—" denotes releases that did not chart.

== Filmography ==
=== Dramas ===
Year	Title	Role	Notes	Ref.
2012	Dream High 2	JB/Jang Woo-jae		
2013	When a Man Falls in Love	Seo Mi-joon		
2015	Dream Knight	JB	Korean-Chinese online drama by JYPE and Youku Tudou	

=== Television shows ===
Year	Title	Role	Notes	Ref.
2012	The Romantic & Idol	Regular member	with Jun. K, Mir, Park Hyung-sik, Son Ji-hyun, Oh Seung-ah, Jei and Shin Hye-jeong (Season 1)	
2016	Celebrity Bromance	Cast member	with Yoo Youngjae (B.A.P) (Season 12)	
2017	Law of the Jungle	Cast member	in Cook Islands (Episode 293–298)	
2017	I Can See Your Voice	Cast member	with BamBam, Youngjae, Yugyeom, Jinyoung, and Mark	
2018	Hyena on the Keyboard	Producer	Episode 6–8	
2019	Prison Life of Fools	Cast member	Episode 1–6, 13–18, 23–24	
2021	King of Mask Singer	Contestant	as Toad's House (Episode 319)	
2022	Artistak Game	User agent		

=== Web shows ===
Year	Title	Role	Ref.
2022	The Origin	Judge	

=== Radio shows ===
Year	Title	Role	Note	Ref.
2015	Kiss the Radio	Special host	with Youngjae (October 15)	
2020	Idol Radio	Special host	with Yugyeom (Episode 571, April 26) with Youngjae (Episodes 572, 574, April 27 to 28)	
2021–2022	StationZ: Jay B's R&B	DJ	Every Wednesday (September 8, 2021 to April 27, 2022)	

== Music videos ==
Year	Title	Artist	Director	Notes	Ref.
2012	"Together"	Jay B, Jiyeon		Dream High 2 OST	
2017	"U & I"	Jay B, Jackson		The Package OST	
2018	"Sunrise"	Got7	Naive Creative Production	Solo song from Got7's album Present: You	
2019	"Be With You"	Jay B		A Day Before Us Season ZERO OST	
2021	"B.T.W"	Jay B feat. Jay Park	Beomjin (Paranoid Paradigm)		
2021	"AM PM"	Jay B feat. Wheein			
2021	"Fame"	Jay B feat. Junny			
2021	"Thought of You" (생각했어)	Ourealgoat feat. Jay B	Sillyello		
2021	"Nostalgia" (Lyric Video Ver.)	Junny feat. Jay B			
2022	"Sunset With You"	Def.	It's Not Spring		
2022	"Hello 2.0 (Legends Only)"	James Reid, Jay B and ØZI			
2022	"Windy Day" (바람이 나를 안을 때)	Bigone feat. Jay B	Oh Ji-hwan		
2022	"Dive Into You"	Jay B		Crazy Love OST	
2022	"Rocking Chair" (흔들의자)	Jay B	It's Not Spring		
2022	"Closer"	Jay B and Youngjae		Good Job OST	
2022	"Go Up"	Jay B	Hobin		
2022	"My Abandoned Love"	Def.	It's Not Spring		
2022	"My Abandoned Love" (Mdnght ver.)	Def.	It's Not Spring		
2024	"Crash" (Director's Cut)	Jay B	Hobin		
2026	"Layback"	Jay B			
2026	"Honeydew"	Jay B			

== Awards and nominations ==
Award	Year	Category	Nominated work	Result	Ref.
APAN Music Awards	2020	Best All Rounder	Jay B	Won	
Asia Artist Awards	2021	Popularity Award – Male Solo Singer	Jay B	Nominated	
Asia Artist Awards	2021	U+Idol Live Popularity Award – Male Solo Singer	Jay B	Nominated	
K-World Dream Awards	2026	K-World Dream Best All-Round Musician Award	Jay B	Won	
Weibo Cultural Communication Night	2026	Asia's Most Popular Performance Star Award	Jay B	Won	
