= Archive 1: Road Runner =

Archive 1: [Road Runner]
- Digital cover

Studio album by Jay B
- Released: November 27, 2024
- Genre: R&B
- Length: 34:01 (digital); 40:42 (physical)
- Language: Korean
- Label: Mauve Company
- Producers: Lim Bo-ra, Def. (executive)

Jay B chronology
| Abandoned Love. (2022) | Archive 1: [Road Runner] (2024) | TR.EE (2026) |

Archive 1: [Road Runner] is the first studio album by South Korean singer Jay B, released on November 27, 2024.

== Background ==
The release of Archive 1: [Road Runner] was announced in early November 2024, following Jay B's discharge from mandatory military service. The album consists of thirteen tracks, two of which are exclusive to the physical edition, written and composed by the singer under the pseudonym Def. and they convey the emotion of reunion, the discovery of a more mature self, and the excitement of starting over. The title is composed of two elements: "Archive 1" indicates Jay B's intention to release more albums, while "Road Runner" represents his determination to keep running forward.

The album's tracks "weave together introspection, vulnerability, and a longing for freedom." The singer began working on the first track, "Baby," nine years earlier. The song, along with "If You," is about an innocent love. "Crash" expresses a desire to find meaning in everything around him as he embarks on his journey, while "Cloud Nine" is an R&B track that compares happiness to the feeling of floating on a cloud.

== Critical reception ==
For Marianna Baroli of Panorama, the album is "a musical portrait of an artist evolving, baring his soul without fear." Nylon wrote that Jay B's artistic freedom had come to the forefront in his first full-length album, praising its emotional honesty and innovative sounds.

"Cloud Nine" was listed among the 40 best K-pop songs of 2024 by The Stardust Mag.

== Track listing ==
All tracks are written by Def.

| No. | Title | Lyrics | Music | Arrangement | Length |
|---|---|---|---|---|---|
| 1. | "Baby" | iHwak | iHwak, Royal Dive | Royal Dive | 3:17 |
| 2. | "If You" | | Royal Dive | Royal Dive | 2:53 |
| 3. | "Make Me Right" | Leon | Leon, LNB | LNB | 3:10 |
| 4. | "Chosen" | | Royal Dive | Royal Dive | 2:59 |
| 5. | "Take it Easy" | Junny | Royal Dive, Junny | Royal Dive | 3:09 |
| 6. | "Crash" | Paul Blanco, Jomalxne | Saimon, RoseInPeace, Paul Blanco, Jomalxne | RoseInPeace, Saimon | 2:51 |
| 7. | "Preview" | D.ham | Moon Hanmiru, Mirror Boy | Mirror Boy | 2:49 |
| 8. | "°C (Temperature)" (°C (온도)) | | Lee Sang-chul, Moon Hanmiru, Mirror Boy | Mirror Boy, Lee Sang-chul | 2:57 |
| 9. | "Right Back" | Zayson | Zayson | Zayson | 3:45 |
| 10. | "Inside" | iHwak | iHwak, Puzzle Shop, Jayden, Yoo Je-hyuk | Puzzle Shop, Jayden, Yoo Je-hyuk | 3:07 |
| 11. | "Cloud Nine" | | Spencer William, Markie Alvin Thompson, Baeeum, Largo, Chad, iHwak | Baeeum, Largo, Chad | 3:04 |
| Total length: | | | | | 34:01 |

Physical edition

All tracks are written by Def.

| No. | Title | Music | Arrangement | Length |
|---|---|---|---|---|
| 12. | "Present" | Wuk | Wuk | 3:25 |
| 13. | "Winter Night" | NO2ZCAT, Vella | NO2ZCAT, Vella | 3:16 |
| Total length: | | | | 40:42 |

== Charts ==
Archive 1: [Road Runner] debuted at No. 13 on the Circle Weekly Albums Chart and sold 23,490 copies in November 2024.

=== Weekly charts ===
Weekly chart performance for Archive 1: [Road Runner]
| Chart (2024) | Peak position |
|---|---|
| South Korean Albums (Circle) | 13 |

=== Monthly charts ===
Monthly chart performance for Archive 1: [Road Runner]
| Chart (2024) | Peak position |
|---|---|
| South Korean Albums (Circle) | 48 |
