= SOMO:Fume =

- Digital cover

EP by Jay B
- Released: August 26, 2021
- Recorded: 2021
- Studio: H1ghr Music
- Genre: R&B
- Length: 19:26 (digital); 22:15 (physical)
- Language: Korean
- Labels: H1ghr Music; Warner Music Korea
- Producers: Cha Cha Malone; Gray; GroovyRoom; Woogie; Jay Park (executive)

Jay B chronology
SOMO:Fume (2021)	Love. (2022)

Singles from SOMO:Fume
- 1. "B.T.W (feat. Jay Park)" Released: August 26, 2021; 2. "Fame (feat. Junny)" Released: August 26, 2021

SOMO:Fume (stylized as SOMO:FUME) is the first extended play by South Korean singer Jay B. It was released on August 26, 2021.

== Background and release ==
On July 22, 2021, H1ghr Music announced that Jay B would release his first EP on August 26, and revealed the title, SOMO:Fume, on August 16. Jay B had already hinted at the title over the previous weeks by posting photos on Instagram with the hashtag "#fume". The tracklist was disclosed on August 17, and the featuring artists on the 23rd: SOMO:Fume consists of six tracks covering various spectrum of the R&B genre, and includes the single "Switch It Up" released in May 2021. The title is a word pun with the Korean word "somopum" (Korean: 소모품), meaning "consumable goods", and the English "perfume", indicating the singer's intention that the disc is both consumed and kindly absorbed by the audience.

On August 24, H1ghr Music released a preview video of the album through their official SNS and YouTube channel. SOMO:Fume was released on August 26, both digitally and physically, along with the music video of the title track "B.T.W". The disc's structure is reminiscent of a diary, with songs about love or the pain of waiting, and an ambience that, according to Clash Magazine, shifts "between drizzly afternoons and sultry evenings". Lyrics are usually passive and describe a dependant relationship in which the heart fluctuates like a wave.

Midtempo title track "B.T.W" tells the story of a man who wants nothing more than the company of his loved one, promising them love and luxury in a relaxed urban R&B atmosphere that combines chillhop trap, 808 drum, bass and pluck sound. It was written imagining a walk along the Han River with a lover, and the reverb effect used on the singer's voice recalls open spaces and freedom. "AM PM" features mild guitar and percussion riffs, accompanied by the synthesizer, and talks about the dizzy feeling of being in love. While bass-based "Fame" is faster, "In To You" is slightly jazzy, with a relaxed rhythm supported by the trumpet and a Moog-like synth, and in the lyrics, written thinking about two people having a glass of wine together, love is portrayed "sort of like the process of wine fermenting". "Count On Me", with light acoustic guitar rhythms combined with a summer atmosphere reminiscent of the pop R&B hits of the 2000s, reassures about fidelity with nostalgic tones.

The physical edition of SOMO:Fume includes a seventh track, "Paranoia", in which Jay B wants someone to help him escape the mental distress caused by an unstable world. The song, which expresses the anxiety, worries and burdens of a person, is a reference to the mental health of the singer, diagnosed with depression and panic attacks, and was written with the intention of portraying a situation in which anyone can find themselves in a moment of their life.

== Promotions ==
Jay B promoted "B.T.W" with Jay Park on M Countdown on August 26, and Inkigayo on August 29.

== Critical reception ==
Professional ratings
Review scores
Source	Rating
NME	3/5 stars
Rhythmer	3/5 stars
Seoul Therapy	9/10

According to Rolling Stone India, "Jay B invites listeners to discover the depths of his artistry". For ABS-CBN News, the entire EP is a testament to the singer's individuality, with whom he "strips down to his most authentic style as an artist and individual", and in which "his sleek R&B vocals coupled with a dash of confident sentimentality evoked smooth and sultry musky perfume", imprinting on it his love for nature, reading books, cats, and photographs. Teen Vogue's Alexis Hodoyan-Gastelum likened the record to "a coffret of naturally romantic notes", indicating "Fame" and "Count On Me" as the top notes, "B.T.W" and "Switch It Up" as the heart notes, and "AM PM" and "In To You" as the base notes. Reviewing for Bollywood Hungama, Nandini Iyengar highlighted how SOMO:Fume presents listeners with a story from start to finish, similar to the stages of a romantic relationship seen in a rom-com movie, judging Jay B's work "brilliant". Seoul Therapy rated the album 9 out of 10, considering it a successful EP who could be appreciated by people who enjoy good R&B, in which Jay B "shows his fun flirty side as well as his pensive and sensitive one". For The Kraze Magazine, it's a refreshing, chill and comforting album with which he manages to make his artistry and style shine, "the epitome of relief, joy, and creativity that was hidden but now found".

On the other hand, NME's Sofiana Ramli gave SOMO:Fume 3 out of 5 stars, appreciating the chemistry between Jay B and the guest artists, but considering it at times not living up to its expectations "for a project that boldly proclaims to be a style of its own". She found the record lacking a clear distinction from other artists in the R&B scene and felt that it fell back on tried and tested formulas, giving it a sense of familiarity which made it sound less fresh and innovative. She claimed that "AM PM" sounded more like a Dean release, and "B.T.W" and "Switch It Up" too dependent on Cha Cha Malone's repetitive production, but also found "In To You", "Fame" and "Count On Me" the most surprising songs, fruit of a winning production combination.

Similar remarks were also advanced by Rhythmer's Kim Hyo-jin, who considered the choice of a close collaboration with the other artists of H1ghr Music, aimed at redefining the image of the singer and demonstrating his complete affiliation with the new record label, an obvious and not challenging solution to the question "Who is Jay B?" Most importantly, she felt that the production had failed to highlight the strengths of the singer's voice by overshadowing it.

At the end of the year, "Fame" was included among the best K-pop songs of 2021 according to Teen Vogue.

== Track listing ==
No.	Title	Lyrics	Music	Arrangement	Length
1.	"B.T.W" (featuring Jay Park)	Defsoul; Jay Park	Cha Cha Malone; Defsoul; Jay Park	Cha Cha Malone	3:12
2.	"AM PM" (featuring Wheein)	Defsoul; Sound Kim; Jay Park	Gray; DAX; Chrli; Defsoul; Sound Kim; Jay Park	Gray; DAX; Chrli	3:37
3.	"Fame" (featuring Junny)	Defsoul; Junny	GroovyRoom; Bin; Bell; Defsoul; Junny	GroovyRoom; Bin; Bell	2:23
4.	"In to You" (featuring G1nger)	Defsoul; G1nger; Jay Park	Woogie; Defsoul; G1nger; Jay Park	Woogie	3:38
5.	"Switch It Up" (featuring Sokodomo)	Defsoul; Sokodomo; Jay Park	Cha Cha Malone; Defsoul; Jay Park	Cha Cha Malone	3:35
6.	"Count On Me"	Defsoul	GroovyRoom; Kwaca; Defsoul; Junny	Kwaca	3:01
Total length:					19:26

CD only

No.	Title	Lyrics	Music	Arrangement	Length
7.	"Paranoia"	Defsoul; Jay Park	GroovyRoom; Defsoul; Jay Park; pH-1	GroovyRoom	2:49
Total length:					22:15

== Personnel ==
Personnel adapted from the liner notes of the physical album.

- Jay B (Defsoul) – vocals, lyrics, composition
- Bae So-yoon – recording, vocal engineering
- Bell – composition (track 3), arrangements (track 3)
- Bin – composition (track 3), arrangements (track 3)
- Chrli – composition (track 2), arrangements (track 2)
- DAX – composition (track 2), arrangements (track 2)
- G1nger – featuring (track 4), lyrics (track 4), composition (track 4)
- Gray – production (track 2), composition (track 2), arrangements (track 2)
- GroovyRoom – production (tracks 3, 6–7), composition (tracks 3, 6–7), arrangements (tracks 3, 7)
- Junny – featuring (track 3), lyrics (track 3), composition (tracks 3, 6)
- Kwaca – lyrics (track 6), composition (track 6)
- Cha Cha Malone – composition (tracks 1, 5), arrangements (tracks 1, 5), mixing (track 1), production (tracks 1, 5)
- Jay Park – featuring (track 1), lyrics (tracks 1–2, 4–5, 7), composition (tracks 1–2, 4–5, 7)
- pH-1 – composition (track 7)
- Sokodomo – featuring (track 5), lyrics (track 5)
- Sound Kim – lyrics (track 2), composition (track 2)
- Stay Tuned – mixing (tracks 2–4, 6–7)
- Teezio – mixing (track 5)
- Mike Tucci – mastering
- Wheein – featuring (track 2)
- Woogie – production (track 4), arrangements (track 4)

== Charts ==
Chart performance for SOMO:Fume
Chart (2021)	Peak position
Japanese Albums (Oricon)	33
South Korean Albums (Gaon)	5
