= Wonder Teacher =

2015–16 Thai television series

- Official series poster
- Thai: อัศจรรย์คุณครูเทวดา
- Genre: Comedy; Romance
- Created by: GMMTV
- Starring: Kiattisak Udomnak; Vichayut Limratanamongkol; Pumipat Paiboon; Chawinroj Likitcharoensakul; Akeburud Sophon
- Country of origin: Thailand
- Original language: Thai
- No. of episodes: 23

Production
- Running time: 45 minutes
- Production companies: GMMTV; Sea Studio

Original release
- Network: One31
- Release: 3 October 2015 – 12 March 2016

Wonder Teacher (Thai: อัศจรรย์คุณครูเทวดา; RTGS: At-sa-chan Khun-khru The-wa-da) is a 2015–2016 Thai television series starring Kiattisak Udomnak, Vichayut Limratanamongkol (Best), Pumipat Paiboon (Prame), Chawinroj Likitcharoensakul (Fame) and Akeburud Sophon (Suice).

Produced by GMMTV together with Sea Studio, the series was one of the two television series announced by GMMTV on 25 August 2015 along with Room Alone 2. It premiered on One31 on 3 October 2015, airing on Saturdays at 10:00 ICT. The series concluded on 12 March 2016.

== Cast and characters ==
Below are the cast of the series:

=== Main ===
- Kiattisak Udomnak as Teacher Asanee

=== Supporting ===
- Oranicha Krinchai (Proud) as Teacher Ple
- Acharanat Ariyaritwikol (Nott) as Teacher Thas
- Daniela Marisa Kaapro as Prim
- Pumipat Paiboon (Prame) as Richter
- Vichayut Limratanamongkol (Best) as Typhoon
- Akeburud Sophon (Suice) as Isaac
- Sutthipha Kongnawdee (Noon) as Pudthan
- Chawinroj Likitcharoensakul (Fame) as Phatra
- Tytan Teepprasan as Sharp
- Korapat Kirdpan (Nanon) as Book
- Rutricha Phapakithi (Ciize) as Cherry

=== Guest ===
- Sarunchana Apisamaimongkol (Aye) as Marry (Typhoon's sister)
- Veerakaarn Nuchanart (Puaen) (Ep. 8)
