= Tytan Teepprasan =

Thai singer, songwriter and actor (born 1999)

- ไทแทน ทีปประสาน
- Born: 5 March 1999 (age 27); Los Angeles, US
- Education: University College London
- Occupations: Singer; songwriter; actor
- Years active: 2014–present
- Agent: GMMTV
- Height: 1.78 m (5 ft 10 in)
- Musical career
- Genres: Pop; T-pop
- Instruments: Vocals; piano; violin; guitar; drums
- Labels: GMM Grammy; 411 Entertainment
- Formerly of: Mad Monkeys

YouTube information
- Channel: tytan.t

Tytan Teepprasan (Thai: ไทแทน ทีปประสาน; born 5 March 1999), also known mononymously as Tytan (stylized in all caps), is a Thai singer, songwriter, and actor under GMMTV. He debuted as a member of the former boy group Mad Monkeys under GMM Grammy in 2014. He made his solo debut under 411 Music in June 2022. He departed from 411 Music and returned to GMMTV in July 2026.

== Early life and education ==
Tytan was born on 5 March 1999 in Los Angeles. He moved to Bangkok with his mother when he was around three years old. His father remained in Los Angeles, where he operates a Thai restaurant.

Trained in classical music, Tytan began learning piano at around the age of three, played violin in his school's orchestra, picked up dancing around the age of ten, and started writing music when he was eleven. He sat his ABRSM examinations in both piano and violin up to Grade 8.

He attended Shrewsbury International School, Bangkok Riverside campus, graduating in 2017, and later earned a Bachelor of Science in Management Science from the University College London.

== Career ==
=== 2010–2020: Career beginnings, Mad Monkeys ===
Tytan joined GMM Grammy as a trainee at the age of eleven. In 2014, he debuted as a member of the boy group Mad Monkeys with their debut single "Maen Maen Faen Khon Diao (แมน แมน แฟนคนเดียว)".

He also began acting in GMMTV productions, appearing in Wifi Society: Secret in the Paper Plane (2015), starring his group members Akeburud Sophon (Suice) and Pumipat Paiboon (Prame). He also played as Sharp in Wonder Teacher (2015), and as Achi in Water Boyy (2017). He went on to star as Data in the miniseries Please... Siang Riak Winyan (2017) alongside Wachirawit Ruangwiwat (Chimon), Putthipong Assaratanakul (Billkin), and Vitchapol Somkid (Nice). He also made an appearance as Pai in Blacklist (2019).

=== 2020–2026: 411 Music, Your Call, and Y.O.B.O. ===
During his third year at UCL, Tytan decided he was ready to release his own music, hoping to sign with a record label before graduating. In January 2020, he independently released his first solo single titled "อ้อมกอด" (Embrace) on his YouTube channel, which led him to sign with 411 Music, a music label division under 411 Entertainment. The company sent him to South Korea for around two years to train as an artist and develop his music production skills.

In June 2022, he officially debuted as the first male solo artist under 411 Music, releasing his single "All Night", featuring South Korean rapper Loco. Tytan was involved in every step of his music creation process, including writing, composing, and arranging. He released his first EP, Your Call, in March 2023.

His fandom was given the name "Thunder" (ธันเดอร์). Tytan shared that the name was partly inspired by a severe storm that delayed his debut showcase. He chose the name to reflect the positive energy and power that his fans give him.

He went on to work with other artists based in South Korea. In November 2023, Tytan was featured on the song "Alone" by B.I. Tytan also collaborated with Minnie, who appeared in the music video for his single "Yobo", released in June 2024. Tytan co-wrote her song "Obsession", featuring Ten, released in January 2025.

In November 2024, Tytan and actress Rattanawadee Wongthong (Mim) starred in the short film My Soulmate Is Meteor, based on his single "ฝนดาวตก" (Meteor Shower). In March 2025, Tytan released his mini-album Y.O.B.O. (You're Only Born Once), as well as his single "After the Rain", which he collaborated with songwriters Tabeazy and Smew. Tytan and Smew continued to work together, co-writing the lyrics on BamBam's first Thai-language album, Hometown, released in October 2025.

=== 2026–present: Return to GMMTV, Our Melodies ===
In July 2026, Tytan announced his departure from 411 Music after six years with the label. Tytan returned to GMMTV and is set to appear in the upcoming series Heartbound, starring Tanapon Sukumpantanasan (Perth) and Pongsapak Udompoch (Santa). He is also set to star in the lead role as Pao, alongside Kittiphop Sereevichayasawat (Satang), in the upcoming series Our Melodies.

=== Personal ventures ===
Beyond music, Tytan had a dream of running a restaurant ever since he was a child. He and a friend launched a yakiniku restaurant called Domo Yakiniku in October 2025.

== Discography ==
=== Extended plays ===
Title	Details
Your Call	Released: 23 March 2023; Label: 411 Entertainment; Formats: Digital download, streaming; Tracklist: 1. "Wish Wish"; 2. "Your Call (อยู่ที่เธอ)"; 3. "Angel"; 4. "All Night" (feat. Loco)
Y.O.B.O. (You're Only Born Once)	Released: 11 March 2025; Label: 411 Entertainment; Formats: Digital download, streaming, USB flash drive; Tracklist: 1. "After the Rain"; 2. "Bestie."; 3. "ฝนดาวตก" (Meteor Shower); 4. "Yobo"; 5. "ฝนดาวตก" (Meteor Shower) [Acoustic version]; 6. "Yobo" (Acoustic version)

=== Singles ===
==== As lead artist ====
Year	Title	Ref.
2020	"อ้อมกอด" (Embrace)	
2022	"All Night" (feat. Loco)	
2023	"Your Call (อยู่ที่เธอ)"	
2023	"Wish Wish"	
2024	"Yobo"	
2024	"ฝนดาวตก" (Meteor Shower)	
2025	"After the Rain"	

==== Collaborations ====
Year	Title	Artist	Ref.
2014	"Maen Maen Faen Khon Diao (แมน แมน แฟนคนเดียว)"	Mad Monkeys	
2015	"Rak Baep Phuean Mai Muean Faen (รักแบบเพื่อนไม่เหมือนแฟน)"	Mad Monkeys	
2023	"Alone"	B.I feat. Tytan	

==== Soundtrack appearances ====
Year	Title	Album	Ref.
2016	"Yak Pen Faen Thoe (Tong Phueng Thewada) (อยากเป็นแฟนเธอ (ต้องพึ่งเทวดา))" (with Mad Monkeys feat. Sena Hoi)	Wonder Teacher OST	
2017	"ไม่กลัว (Not Afraid)" (with Billkin)	Please... Siang Riak Winyan OST	
2026	"หาก (No Matter What)"	Gunshot OST	

== Filmography ==
=== Film ===
Year	Title	Role	Notes	Ref.
2016	Little Big Dream	Violinist	Guest role	

=== Short film ===
Year	Title	Role	Notes	Ref.
2024	My Soulmate Is Meteor	Tytan	Main role	

=== Television series ===
Key
†	Denotes television productions that have not yet been released

Year	Title	Role	Network	Notes	Ref.
2015	Wifi Society: Secret in the Paper Plane	Jo and Wind's friend	One 31	Supporting role	
2015	Wonder Teacher	Sharp	One 31	Supporting role	
2016	I Love the Fat Guy 2	Wind	Now 26	Guest role (Ep. 4)	
2017	Water Boyy	Achi	GMM 25	Supporting role	
2017	Please... Siang Riak Winyan	Data	Line TV	Main role	
2019	Blacklist	Pai	GMM 25	Guest role (Ep. 2, 9–10)	
TBA	Heartbound †	Narin	TBA	Supporting role	
TBA	Our Melodies †	Pao	TBA	Main role	

=== Television show ===
Year	Title	Network	Notes
2017	มนุษย์ป้าล่าเด็ก Manut Pa La Dek	Line TV	Ep. 12
2022	เรื่องเล่าเช้านี้ Morning News	Channel 3	9 June 2022
2022	T-Pop Stage Show	Workpoint TV	Ep. 41 (11 June 2022)
2022	ตั้งเตาเมาท์บันเทิง Tang Tao Mouth News	Workpoint TV	17 June 2022
2022	แฉ Chae	GMM 25	21 June 2022
2022	เที่ยงบันเทิงสด Thiang Banterng Sod	Channel 7	24 June 2022
2022	Sound Check	One 31	Ep. 99 (13 July 2022)
2023	เรื่องเล่าเช้านี้ Morning News	Channel 3	29 March 2023
2023	วันบันเทิง One News	One 31	30 March 2023
2023	เที่ยงบันเทิงสด Thiang Banterng Sod	Channel 7	4 April 2023
2023	ห้องข่าวบันเทิง Workpoint Gossip	Workpoint TV	2 July 2023
2024	T-Pop Stage Show	Workpoint TV	27 June, 31 October 2024
2024	Piano & I	TorBright Channel	Ep. 101
2024	Thailand Music Countdown	Channel 3	Ep. 21 (29 September 2024)
2024	รอบวัน Rop Wan	One 31	Ep. 335 (28 October 2024)
2024	เรื่องเล่าเช้านี้ Morning News	Channel 3	1 November 2024
2024	เที่ยงบันเทิงสด Thiang Banterng Sod	Channel 7	7 November 2024
2025	T-Pop Stage	Workpoint TV	13 March 2025
2026	Arm Share	GMMTV	Ep. 216

== Live performances ==
Year	Date	Name	Venue	Notes	Ref.
2022	10 June	Tytan Debut Showcase	Block I, Siam Square	Originally scheduled for 8 June 2022	
2023	5 August	2023 Harbour Chill Carnival	Wan Chai Harbourfront Area		
2026	5 September	Gemini Art-Venture Concert	BITEC Live	Guest appearance	

== Awards and nominations ==
Award nominations for Tytan Teepprasan
Year	Award	Category	Nominee(s)	Result	Ref.
2025	Howe Awards 2025	Hottest Male Singer Award		Nominated	
