= Bamesis =

- Digital cover

EP by BamBam
- Released: August 8, 2024
- Studio: Abyss Company
- Genre: Hip hop; Latin; Trap; Contemporary R&B
- Length: 14:49
- Language: English; Korean
- Label: Abyss Company
- Producer: BamBam

BamBam chronology
Sour & Sweet (2023)	Bamesis (2024)	Hometown (2025)

Singles from Bamesis
- 1. "Last Parade" Released: August 8, 2024

Bamesis is the third extended play by South Korea-based Thai rapper and singer BamBam, released on August 8, 2024.

== Background and release ==
The release of Bamesis was announced in mid-July 2024 for the following August 8, almost one year and a half after Sour & Sweet. The title is a portmanteau with "BamBam" and "genesis", to signify the world that BamBam has created. The singer produced the album himself, incorporating his stories and personal growth: Bamesis moves away from pop music, instead featuring songs from different genres ranging from hip hop to Latin music. "Last Parade," the only song not in English, is about confidence and ambition; "Mi Último Deseo" is about redemption; "Must Be Nice" expresses BamBam's feelings for his fans, while "Thank You Come Again" is a thank you to haters.

== Reception ==
For Nandini Iyengar of Bollywood Hungama, Bamesis is a confident and exploratory project, "a sonic universe where BamBam has complete creative control, experimenting with different genres and styles without losing his signature flair," and concluded that he had finally found his identity as a soloist.

== Commercial performance ==
Bamesis debuted at #20 on the Circle Weekly Album Chart in its release week, rising at #2 the following week. It was the 11th best-selling album of the month with 97,123 copies sold.

== Track listing ==
No.	Title	Lyrics	Music	Length
1.	"Last Parade"	Earattack, Don Baller, Cimo Fränkel, Rik Annema, JOOPEPE, BamBam	Earattack, Don Baller, Cimo Fränkel, Rik Annema, BamBam	3:07
2.	"Mi Último Deseo"	Ale Alberti, Storii, Duck Blackwell, Bryan Chong	Ale Alberti, Storii, Duck Blackwell, BamBam, Bryan Chong	2:47
3.	"Ball Like That"	Chaz Mishan, Max Matluck, Robert James Russell	Chaz Mishan, Max Matluck, Robert James Russell, BamBam	2:42
4.	"Must Be Nice"	Kes Cross, BamBam	Ruwanga Samath, Erick Serna, BamBam, Bryan Chong	3:28
5.	"Thank You Come Again"	Derrick Milano, Ariel Imani, Nilo Blues, BamBam, Bryan Chong	Murda Beatz, BoogzDaBeast, FNZ, BamBam, Bryan Chong	2:45
Total length:				14:49

== Charts ==
Weekly chart performance for Bamesis
Chart (2024)	Peak position
South Korean Albums (Circle)	2

Monthly chart performance for Bamesis
Chart (2024)	Peak position
South Korean Albums (Circle)	11
