= Hometown (BamBam EP) =

- Digital cover

EP by BamBam
- Released: October 10, 2025
- Genres: Pop; contemporary R&B; dance; hip-hop
- Length: 14:08
- Language: Thai
- Label: Halo Corporation
- Producer: BamBam

BamBam chronology
Bamesis (2024)	Hometown (2025)

Singles from Hometown
- 1. "Dancing By Myself" Released: September 12, 2025; 2. "Wondering" Released: October 10, 2025

Hometown is the fourth extended play by South Korea-based Thai rapper and singer BamBam, released on October 10, 2025.

== Background and release ==
Hometown is BamBam's first album entirely in Thai, featuring collaborations with Timethai, Jeff Satur, and Ink Waruntorn, while Pharrell Williams produced the final track. The idea for the album was born in 2023, but it was in May 2024, while the singer was passing through his childhood neighborhood while going to Rajamangala Stadium for a concert, that he thought about making it. Hometown fulfills the desire to present something entirely from his homeland, conveying the stories and memories of the places where he grew up.

"Dancing By Myself," whose Thai title means "alone at night," is a dance pop ode to independence and self-expression. "Greenlight" is about having someone who's ready to go anywhere with you, while "Angel in Disguise" is about dedicating everything to the person you love. "Angel in Disguise" is a tribute to BamBam's mother.

== Track listing ==
All lyrics are written by BamBam, Tytan and Smew; all music is composed by BamBam and Jeong Seongmin (Psycho Tension).

No.	Title	Lyrics	Music	Length
1.	"Dancing By Myself (ไม่มีใครสักคืน)" (featuring Timethai)	Adam Halliday, Cody Tarpley, Avedon	Adam Halliday, Cody Tarpley, Avedon	2:46
2.	"More Than Friend (มากกว่าfriend)" (featuring Jeff Satur)	Jeff Satur, Ebby Marango, Shanks., Jacks Lawson, Eli Brown	Jeff Satur, Ebby Marango, Shanks., Jacks Lawson, Eli Brown	3:04
3.	"Wondering"	Kyle Reynolds, Michael Fatkin, SHY Martin	Kyle Reynolds, Michael Fatkin, SHY Martin	2:48
4.	"Greenlight (ไฟเขียว)" (featuring Ink Waruntorn)	Kyle Reynolds, Michael Fatkin, SHY Martin	Kyle Reynolds, Michael Fatkin, SHY Martin	2:16
5.	"Angel in Disguise"	Pharrell Williams	Pharrell Williams	3:14
Total length:				14:08

== Charts ==
=== Weekly charts ===
Weekly chart performance for Hometown
Chart (2025)	Peak position
South Korean Albums (Circle)	9

=== Monthly charts ===
Monthly chart performance for Hometown
Chart (2025)	Peak position
South Korean Albums (Circle)	20
