= Sud Kaen Saen Rak =

- Also known as: The Hated Rivals
- Genre: Melodrama; Period; Family; Revenge
- Based on: Sud Kaen Saen Rak by Chulamanee
- Written by: Yingyot Panya
- Directed by: Krit Sukramongkol; Adul Prayanto
- Starring: Ratklao Amaradit; Manatsanun Phanlerdwongsakul; Pornchita na Songkhla; Kanin Chobpradit; Sirin Preediyanon; Amolrada Chaiyadej; Chintara Sukapatana; Kullanat Preeyawat; Patiparn Pataweekarn; Rhatha Phongam; Vorarit Fuangarome
- Opening theme: "Chep Ni Cham Chon Tai" (Thai: เจ็บนี้จำจนตาย) performed by Nadda Wiyakarn
- Ending theme: "Pae Rak" (Thai: แพ้รัก) performed by Nan Wathiya
- Country of origin: Thailand
- Original language: Thai
- No. of episodes: 18

Production
- Executive producer: Mayurachat Muenpasitiwet
- Producer: Krit Sukramongkol
- Cinematography: Adul Prayanto
- Running time: 150 minutes Fridays, Saturdays, Sundays at 08:15 pm (ICT)
- Production companies: Maker K Channel 3

Original release
- Network: Channel 3
- Release: April 18 – May 29, 2015

Related
- Krong Kram (2019)

Sud Kaen Saen Rak (Thai: สุดแค้นแสนรัก; lit: "love and vengeance") is a Thai TV series aired on Channel 3 from April 18, 2015, to May 29, 2015, on Fridays, Saturdays, and Sundays at 08:15 pm.

It reruns every day starting April 21, 2022 from 08:50 am to 10:25 am on weekdays and 9:15 am to 10:25 am on Saturday and Sunday.

== Plot ==
The whole story takes place in Nakhon Sawan, 240 km (149.1 mi) north of Thailand's capital, Bangkok, from 1972 to 2011 over two generations.

It tells the story of two families. Hatred and love closely intertwined the lives of two families.

== Cast ==
=== Main ===
Parental generation

- Ratklao Amaradit as Yaem
- Manatsanun Phanlerdwongsakul as Ampohn
- Pornchita na Songkhla as Urai

Second-generation

- Kanin Chobpradit as Yongyuth
  - Jakkarin Phooriphad as Yongyuth (youth)
- Sirin Preediyanon as Hatairat
  - Nita Kannaket as Hatairat (youth)
- Amolrada Chaiyadej as Rapeephan
  - Sarunchana Apisamaimongkol as Rapeephan (youth)
- Nattawin Wattanagitiphat as Thana
  - Vichayut Limratanamongkol as Thana (youth)

=== Supporting ===
Parental generation

- Chintara Sukapatana as Am
- Kullanat Preeyawat as Phayom
- Patiparn Pataweekarn as Tawee
- Vorarit Fuangarome as Luerpong
- Patchata Nampan as Prayong
- Rhatha Phongam as Suda
- Pisanu Nimsakul as Prayoon
- Sudhipong Vatanajang as Ko Ta
- Praimaa Ratchata as Noklek
- Vasidtee Srilofung as Samli
- Tana Sinprasat as Nak

Second-generation

- Artit Tangwiboonpanit as Luerchai
  - Raweeroj Rattanatrakulchai as Luerchai (youth)
- Sattaphong Phiangphor as Pavarit
  - Pisitpong Changlor as Pavarit (youth)
- Panpaporn Sridurongkatham as Mayuri
  - Pornsroung Rouyruen as Mayuri (youth)
- Chutimon Sakulthai as Lada
  - Krongkwan Mongkol as Lada (youth)
- Techin Pinchatree as Wasan
- Kanyarat Sunthronnan as Aoi
- Jeerawat Yotsuphannaporn as Jeera

=== Cameoes ===
- Nukkid Boonthong as Pratuang
- Athiwad Sanidwong na Ayudhya as Khan
- Krailad Kriangkrai as Headman Boonsong
- Pimkae Goonchorn na Ayudhya as Yoi

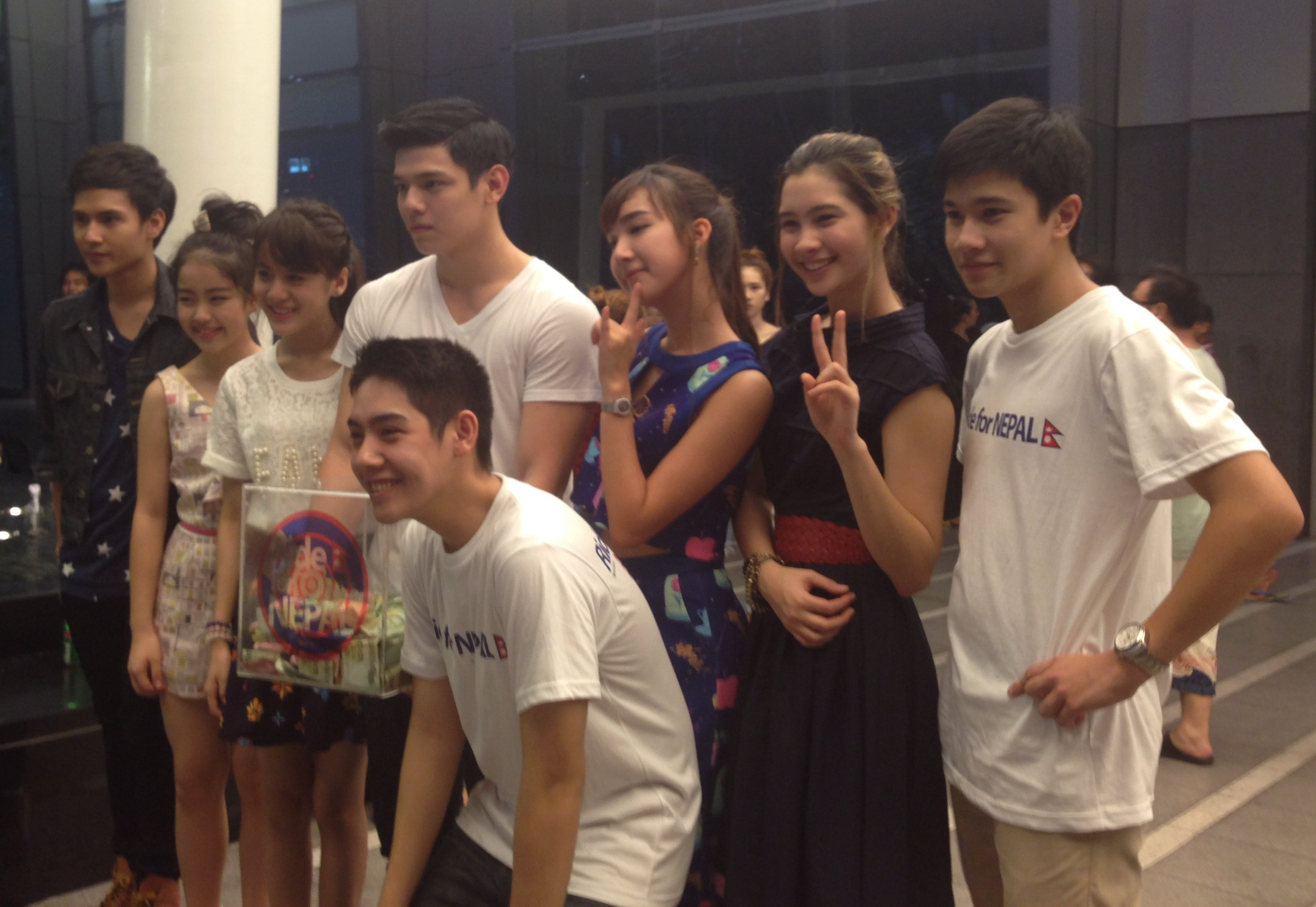
Cast of the series (second-generation)

== Production & reception ==
The series based on a novel in same title by Chulamanee, Nakhon Sawan novelist. It was his second work adapted into a television series, following Ching Chang in 2009 on Channel 5.

All of his novels that have been adapted for television take place in Nakhon Sawan province, to the point where fans have come to call it the "Nakhon Sawan Universe". Although the stories are not directly connected, they are tied together by recurring elements such as characters, locations, events, and similar points in time. The narratives are set against a rural, local backdrop and often centre on the complexity of imperfect families. There are sharp-tongued mothers-in-law who control and torment their daughters-in-law, and every character is deeply human, shaped by jealousy, bias, and emotional fragility that binds them all together.

Filming lasted 16 months, starting in January 2014. Before the broadcast, Sud Kaen Saen Rak was thought to be just an outsider series.

It tells the story of three generations of intertwining lives and the family grudges that befall them. Loaded with melodrama, and the over-the-top physical and verbal fights between female characters that became the show's iconic scenes, it unexpectedly became extremely popular among Thai viewers and became the talk of the town in 2015. The average rating was 7.04, with the finale reaching 11.92, highest of the Channel 3 in the year.

The series was highly acclaimed. Especially the villain protagonist "Yaem" played by the veteran singer and actress Rutklao Amaradit, Yaem is an old woman with a very insidious and shrewish. She is the one who plots the life of her eldest son and grandson to hate their wife and mother.

== Awards and nominations ==
| Award | Category | Nominee(s) | Result | Ref. |
|---|---|---|---|---|
| Siamdara Star Awards 2015 | Best TV Series | Sud Kaen Sean Rak | Won | |
| Siamdara Star Awards 2015 | Best Director (TV Series) | Krit Sukramongkol; Adul Prayanto | Won | |
| Siamdara Star Awards 2015 | Rising Performer | Vichayut Limratanamongkol | Won | |
| Siamdara Star Awards 2015 | Best Villain | Ratklao Amaradit | Won | |
| Seesan Awards 2015 | Popular TV Series | Sud Kaen Saen Rak | Won | |
| Seesan Awards 2015 | Best Director (TV Series) | Krit Sukramongkol; Adul Prayanto | Won | |
| Seesan Awards 2015 | Best Actress | Ratklao Amaradit | Won | |
| 30th TV Gold Awards | Best TV Series | Sud Kaen Saen Rak | Won | |
| 30th TV Gold Awards | Best Supporting Actress | Pornchita na Songkhla | Nominated | |
| 30th TV Gold Awards | Best Actress | Ratklao Amaradit | Nominated | |
| 30th TV Gold Awards | Best Director (TV Series) | Krit Sukramongkol; Adul Prayanto | Nominated | |
| 30th TV Gold Awards | Best Creative TV Series | Sud Kaen Saen Rak | Nominated | |
| 30th TV Gold Awards | Best Screenplay | Yingyot Panya | Nominated | |
| MThai Top Talk-about 2016 | Popular Actress | Ratklao Amaradit | Won | |
| MThai Top Talk-about 2016 | Popular TV Series | Sud Kaen Saen Rak | Won | |
| 13th Kom Chad Luek Awards | Best Screenplay | Yingyot Panya | Won | |
| 13th Kom Chad Luek Awards | Best Supporting Actor | Vorarit Fuangarome | Won | |
| 13th Kom Chad Luek Awards | Best Supporting Actress | Manatsanun Phanlerdwongsakul | Nominated | |
| 13th Kom Chad Luek Awards | Best Actress | Ratklao Amaradit | Won | |
| 13th Kom Chad Luek Awards | Best TV Series | Sud Kaen Saen Rak | Won | |
| 13th Kom Chad Luek Awards | Popular Thai TV Series | Sud Kaen Saen Rak | Nominated | |
| 7th Nataraj Awards | Best Cinematography | Adul Prayanto | Nominated | |
| 7th Nataraj Awards | Best OST | Chep Ni Cham Chon Tai | Won | |
| 7th Nataraj Awards | Best Screenplay | Yingyot Panya | Nominated | |
| 7th Nataraj Awards | Best Casts | Sud Kaen Saen Rak | Won | |
| 7th Nataraj Awards | Best Supporting Actress | Pornchita na Songkhla | Won | |
| 7th Nataraj Awards | Best Supporting Actress | Manatsanun Phanlerdwongsakul | Nominated | |
| 7th Nataraj Awards | Best Actress | Ratklao Amaradit | Won | |
| 7th Nataraj Awards | Best Director | Krit Sukramongkol; Adul Prayanto | Won | |
| 7th Nataraj Awards | Best TV Series | Sud Kaen Saen Rak | Won | |
| International Drama Festival in Tokyo 2016 | Best Foreign Drama | Sud Kaen Saen Rak | Won | |

== Prequel ==
The prequel Krong Kam aired in 2019 on the same channel.

== International broadcast ==
It was broadcast on Cambodia's PNN TV in 2016.
