= Vichayut Limratanamongkol =

Thai actor (born 1997)

- วิชยุตม์ ลิ่มรัตนะมงคล
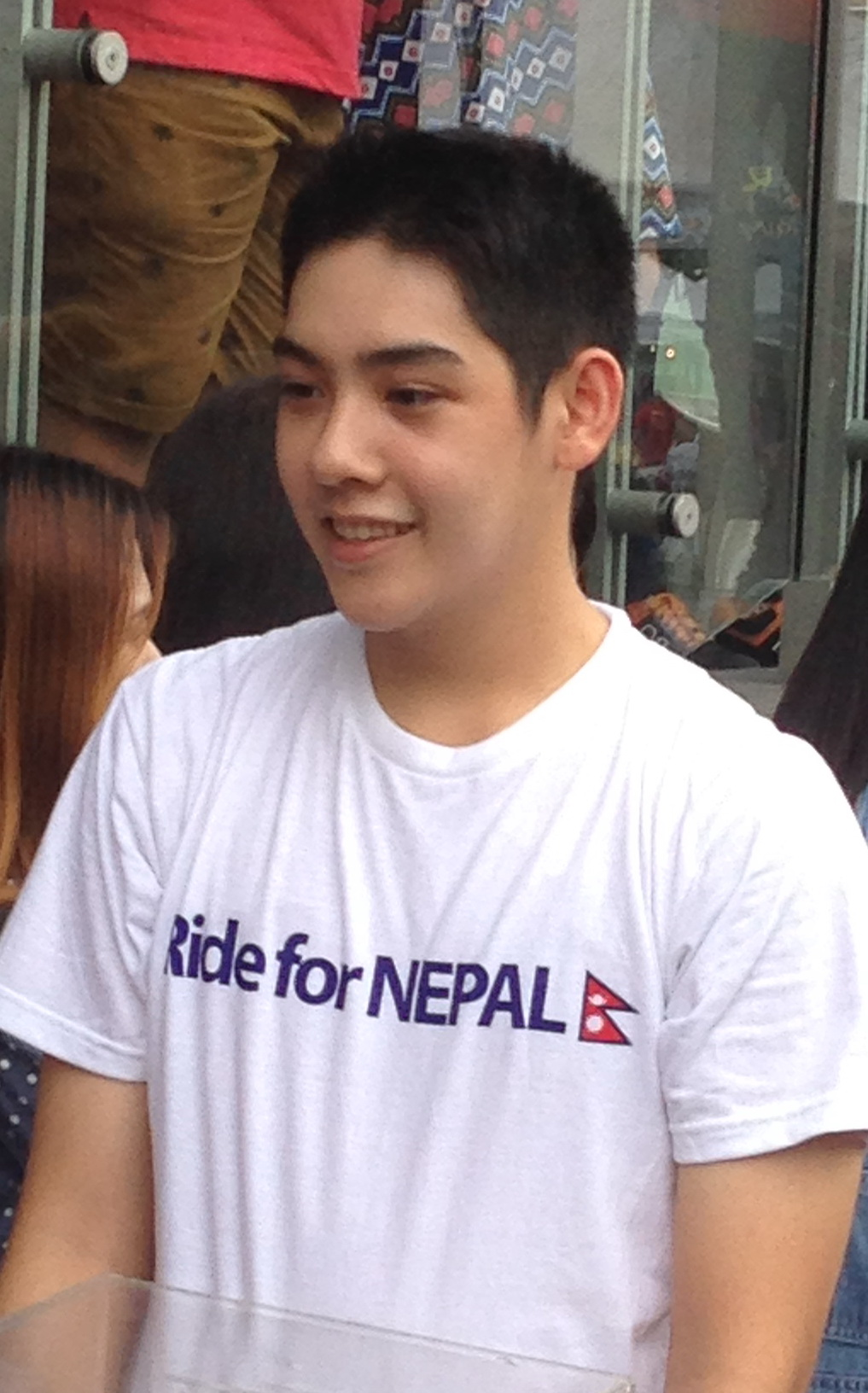
- Vichayut at Central World Ride for Nepal 2015
- Born: October 18, 1997 (age 29); Bangkok, Thailand
- Occupations: Actor; student
- Height: 1.72 m (5 ft 7 1/2 in)
- Website: Official website

Vichayut Limratanamongkol (Thai: วิชยุตม์ ลิ่มรัตนะมงคล; born 18 October 1997), is a Thai actor. He started his career at age 18 in the 2015 film สุดแค้นแสนรัก Channel 3 as young Torna, a son of Ampohn and Thotwee. Torna is a step brother of Yongyuth.

The upcoming film is Pradiwarada, broadcasting at Channel 3 before DuenPradapdao. He is now studying at grade 12, Saint Gabriel's College.

== Filmography ==
=== TV drama ===
Year	Pronunciation in Thai	Role	Producer	On
2015	Sudkaen Saenruk	Young Torna	Maker-K	Channel 3
2015	Padiwarada	Serm	Good Feeling	Channel 3
2016	DuenPradapdao	Young Kanlong		Channel 3
2018	Lom Phrai Pook Rak	Piyawat Mettawong	Cholumpi Productioned	Channel 3

- 2018 Kahon Maha Ratuek Ep.4 Mr. Phadungsak's murder case (กาหลมหรทึก คดีที่ ๔ ร้านขนมเนื่องนวล) (The One Enterprise/One 31) as Wilad (นายวิลาศ เนื่องนวล)
- 2018 Mister Merman (แฟนฉันเป็นเงือก) (Maker Group/Ch.3) as Plangton (พลสิทธิ์ พิทักษ์ชล (แพลงตอน)) with Namnung Suttidachanai
- 2022 Guk Nak Ruk Sa Loey (กั๊กนักรักซะเลย) (Mayom Mahaniyom Production/PPTVHD36) as Kawin Khajornwong (Win) (กวิน ขจรวงศ์ (วิน)) with Manasaporn Chanchalerm
- 2022 Sai Lub Lip Gloss (สายลับลิปกลอส) (Broadcast Thai Television/Ch.3) as Ped (เป็ด)

=== Television series ===
- 2015 Wonder Teacher (อัศจรรย์คุณครูเทวดา) (GMMTV/One 31) as Typhoon (ไต้ฝุ่น)
- 2016 (ซีรีส์เชือกวิเศษไตรภาค ตอน วันที่เธอหายไป) (th:/GMM 25) as Max, Muy (แม็ก กับ มุ่ย (เล่นเป็นสองคน))
- 2017 Love Songs Love Series 2 Ep. (เลิฟซองส์เลิฟซีรีส์ 2 ตอน โปรดส่งใครมารักฉันที) (Keng Kwang Kang/GMM 25) as Taen (แทน)
- 2018 My Hero Series Part 3 :Lom Phrai Pook Rak (Cholumpi Productioned/Ch.3) as Piyawat Mettawong ()
- 2021 Remember You (2021) (Remember You คือเธอ) (/True Asian Series, TrueID+ and Netflix) as Anan (อนันต์)

=== Television sitcom ===
- 20 (ตอน) (The One Enterprise/Ch.) as () (Cameo)

=== Film ===
- 2017 You & Me XXX (2017) (You & Me XXX - เมื่อฉันกับเธอ XXX) (Talent 1 Movie Studio) as Pokpong (ปกป้อง) with Jularat Hanrungroj

=== Music video appearance ===
- 2016 Peun Tee Tup Saun (พื้นที่ทับซ้อน) - Boy Peacemaker (GRAND MUSIK/YouTube:GMM GRAMMY OFFICIAL)

=== Advertising ===
- KFC
- CARSON

== Award of Achievement ==
Year	Award	Award by	when
2015	Best Newcomer Actor Award 2015	Siam Dara Star Awards 2015	June 30, 2015
