= B (BamBam EP) =

- Digital cover

EP by BamBam
- Released: January 18, 2022
- Recorded: 2021
- Studio: Abyss Company
- Genres: Hip hop; trap; R&B; pop
- Length: 16:12
- Languages: Korean; English
- Label: Abyss Company
- Producer: BamBam

BamBam chronology
Ribbon (2021)	B (2022)	Sour & Sweet (2023)

Singles from B
- 1. "Who Are You" Released: December 28, 2021; 2. "Slow Mo" Released: January 18, 2022

B is the second extended play by South Korea-based Thai rapper and singer BamBam. It was released on January 18, 2022.

== Background and release ==
After starting working on a new album in May 2021, BamBam announced it on December 13. The release was preceded by the single "Who Are You" on December 28, which saw him collaborate with Kang Seul-gi of Red Velvet and for which he was credited as a composer, lyricist, producer and mixing engineer.

B was published on January 18, 2022 along with the music video of "Slow Mo". The title of the record is a reference to the singer's name, and, as there are two versions of the album (pink and yellow), the letter gets doubled to form his initials, "BB".

== Music and lyrics ==
B tells the story of the mysterious, changing and colorful world of BamBam, and consists of six tracks: BamBam is credited as a lyricist for all songs, with the exception of "Subliminal". At the press conference of the album, the singer said: "The concept, as I have already mentioned, is my personal world. I have put my colors and my stories in this album. So, when you listen to it, you will understand what BamBam is thinking". Through B, which contrasts with Ribbon's jubilant atmospheres, he wants people to get to know him beyond the cheerful side and to know what he means to say through his music.

The extended play opens with "Intro (Satellites)", which, after a hypnotic and psychedelic beginning, switches to a trap beat before the second verse, and in which is BamBam's alter ego to speak. The two following tracks, "Who Are You" and "Slow Mo", are connected to each other.

"Who Are You" is a sentimental indie-pop song, built on drum beats and acoustic guitar sounds, which shows a more sober side than "Ribbon". In it, the singer embraces the deepest reflections and insights that life has to offer, highlighting BamBam's awareness that he has new chances working as a soloist, and the opportunities to find his true identity. Lyrically, it's a conversation between two lovers who have drifted apart with time due to the gradual evolution and change of their personalities, and highlights the differences between falling in love and falling in love with the idea of love. The theme of the song is visually rendered in the music video through the use of reflections, mirrors and mazes.

While "Who Are You" narrates of the feeling of being manipulated, but not negatively, by one's strongest alter ego, "Slow Mo" talks about accepting it, merging with it, and influencing each other to define your own personality; the hip hop beat harmonizes with the indie base and pop topline in a mid-tempo production. Both songs were written a year and a half to two before release.

In "Subliminal", a trap R&B track entirely in English, BamBam alludes to a complicated situation with a partner and sings that he is tired of the subliminal messages he receives. "Let Me Love You" is a romantic pop song written from the point of view of a person who cares deeply about their lover and wants to share their difficulties. Dedicated to fans, it's an extension of "Look So Fine" from the previous EP. The pop-rock "Ride or Die" closes the album.

== Critical reception ==
Rolling Stone india called "Who Are You" "a turning point in BamBam's career, providing listeners with a nuanced understanding of his artistry", in which he "reestablishes his artistic identity through a euphonious performance laced with golden harmonizations and raspy renders", contrasted by Seulgi's "breathy, dulcet vocals."

EnVi Media found that, compared to Ribbon, B shows the versatility of BamBam as a soloist thanks to a completely different sound. Rachel Collucci of The Kraze commented: "BamBam does a great job of showcasing a different side of himself, a vulnerability that presents itself in the lyrics of his songs and their performances. [...] All in all, BamBam has added another solid collection of songs to his discography. He continues to shine creatively and tell the story of who he is, a story that we will never get tired of listening to."

== Commercial performance ==
Upon release, B debuted at #7 in South Korea on the Gaon Weekly Album Chart, rising to #5 the following week. "Slow Mo" entered the Gaon Download Chart at #4, while, back in December, "Who Are You" ranked #28.

B ranked seventh on the Gaon Monthly Album Chart for January 2022 with 100,468 copies sold.

== Track listing ==
No.	Title	Lyrics	Music	Arrangement	Length
1.	"Intro: Satellites"	BamBam; Dougie F; Bryan Chong	Marzi; Prodbychristo; Dougie F		1:40
2.	"Who Are You" (featuring Seulgi of Red Velvet)	BamBam; Lee Seu-ran; Lee Ha-jin; Grey (Kyle Trewartha, Michael Trewartha); Mikael Temrowski; Livvi Franc	Grey (Kyle Trewartha, Michael Trewartha); Mikael Temrowski; Livvi Franc	Grey (Kyle Trewartha, Michael Trewartha); Mikael Temrowski; Livvi Franc	2:59
3.	"Slow Mo"	BamBam; Lee Seu-ran; Pink Sweat$; Jayson DeZuzio	Pink Sweat$; Jayson DeZuzio	Pink Sweat$; Jayson DeZuzio	2:32
4.	"Subliminal"	Lee Woo-min "Collapsedone"; Ariowa Irosogie; Jimmy Brown	Lee Woo-min "Collapsedone"; Ariowa Irosogie; Jimmy Brown	Lee Woo-min "Collapsedone"	3:21
5.	"Let Me Love You"	BamBam; Jimmy Brown	Jimmy Brown; TM	TM; Psycho Tension (Jung Sung-min, Mollo)	3:13
6.	"Ride or Die"	BamBam; Lee Seu-ran; Earattack	Earattack; Sam F; Elijah Daniel	Earattack; Sam F	2:27
Total length:					16:12

== Charts ==
Weekly chart performance for B
Chart (2022)	Peak position
South Korean Albums (Gaon)	5
