= Sour & Sweet =

- Digital cover

Studio album by BamBam
- Released: March 28, 2023
- Studio: Abyss Company
- Length: 21:11
- Language: Korean
- Label: Abyss Company
- Producer: BamBam

BamBam chronology
B (2022)	Sour & Sweet (2023)	Bamesis (2024)

Singles from Sour & Sweet
- 1. "Sour & Sweet" Released: March 28, 2023

Sour & Sweet is the first studio album by South Korea-based Thai rapper and singer BamBam. It was released on March 28, 2023.

== Background and release ==
After the release of B in January 2022, BamBam first shared he was preparing for a new record in July 2022. In an interview with Cosmopolitan Korea in February 2023, he further revealed it was a full album and that he had been working on it since March 2022; he had also taken part in writing and composing all the songs, except for two. On February 27, 2023, Abyss Company announced the title of the album, Sour & Sweet; pre-orders started the following day. Released on March 28, 2023, Sour & Sweet is BamBam's first music release after one year and two months. The music video for the homonymous title track was filmed in Greece, and sees BamBam becoming a detective who chases a criminal, only to discover it was him.

== Music and lyrics ==
The album presents the story of BamBam's journey, starting from "Feather", which tells his emotions when he arrived to South Korea's Incheon Airport after leaving Thailand, and concluding with "Wings", a song that portrays his current self, which has gained wings thanks to fans' support. The narrative of a single feather now spreading its wings is complemented by autobiographical songs about his father and BamBam's identity as a celebrity.

"Take It Easy" was written when he was struggling mentally and serves as a reminder that the world revolves even if he's not around, while "Ghost" expresses resentment over his father's untimely death and the feeling of missing him very much. The title track, "Sour & Sweet", is a city pop number. BamBam explained that it illustrates two sides of himself: the bright, honest and "sweet" one he shows on variety shows, and the more serious one when he's working on music, which he decided to express with the word "sour".

In "Let's Dance", he compares the romance between lovers to dance, while "About You" talks about the life of a celebrity judged by the public. "Tippy Toe" is about a person tiptoeing in front of a crush.

== Commercial performance ==
On the day of release, Sour & Sweet sold 24,368 copies in South Korea according to the Circle Chart. It subsequently debuted at #3 on the Circle Weekly Album Chart with 103,377 copies sold.

== Track listing ==
No.	Title	Lyrics	Music	Arrangement	Length
1.	"Feather"	Jimmy Brown, BamBam	Coach & Sendo, Jimmy Brown	Coach & Sendo	2:30
2.	"Take It Easy"	Kyle Reynolds, Brandyn Robert Burnette, Nicholas Henriqeus, Garrison Webster, Jawon Daniels, BamBam	Kyle Reynolds, Brandyn Robert Burnette, Nicholas Henriqeus, Garrison Webster, Jawon Daniels, BamBam		2:07
3.	"Ghost"	Adam Halliday, De'La, Sean Fischer, BamBam, Lee Seu-ran	Adam Halliday, De'La, Sean Fischer, BamBam		2:37
4.	"Sour & Sweet"	Jade.J, Kyle Reynolds, Emily Rebecca Vaughn, Jonathan Santana, BamBam	Kyle Reynolds, Emily Rebecca Vaughn, Jonathan Santana, BamBam	Jung Sung-min (Psycho Tension)	2:27
5.	"Let's Dance" (Korean: 춤)	Jimmy Brown	Jimmy Brown, Henny	Henny	3:27
6.	"About You"	Hwang Yoo-bin, Higher Baby, Marty Valentine, BamBam	Higher Baby, Sakehands, Marty Valentine, Softserveboy, Sqvare	Higher Baby, Sakehands, Marty Valentine, Jung Sung-min (Psycho Tension), BamBam	2:45
7.	"Typpy Toe"	Adam Halliday, De'La, Bekah Novi, BamBam	Adam Halliday, De'La, Bekah Novi, BamBam		2:14
8.	"Wings"	Jade.J, BamBam, Adam Halliday, Dillon Deskin	Adam Halliday, Dillon Deskin, BamBam		3:04
Total length:					21:11

== Charts ==
Weekly chart performance for Sour & Sweet
Chart (2023)	Peak position
South Korean Albums (Gaon)	3
