= BamBam =

Thai rapper and singer (born 1997)

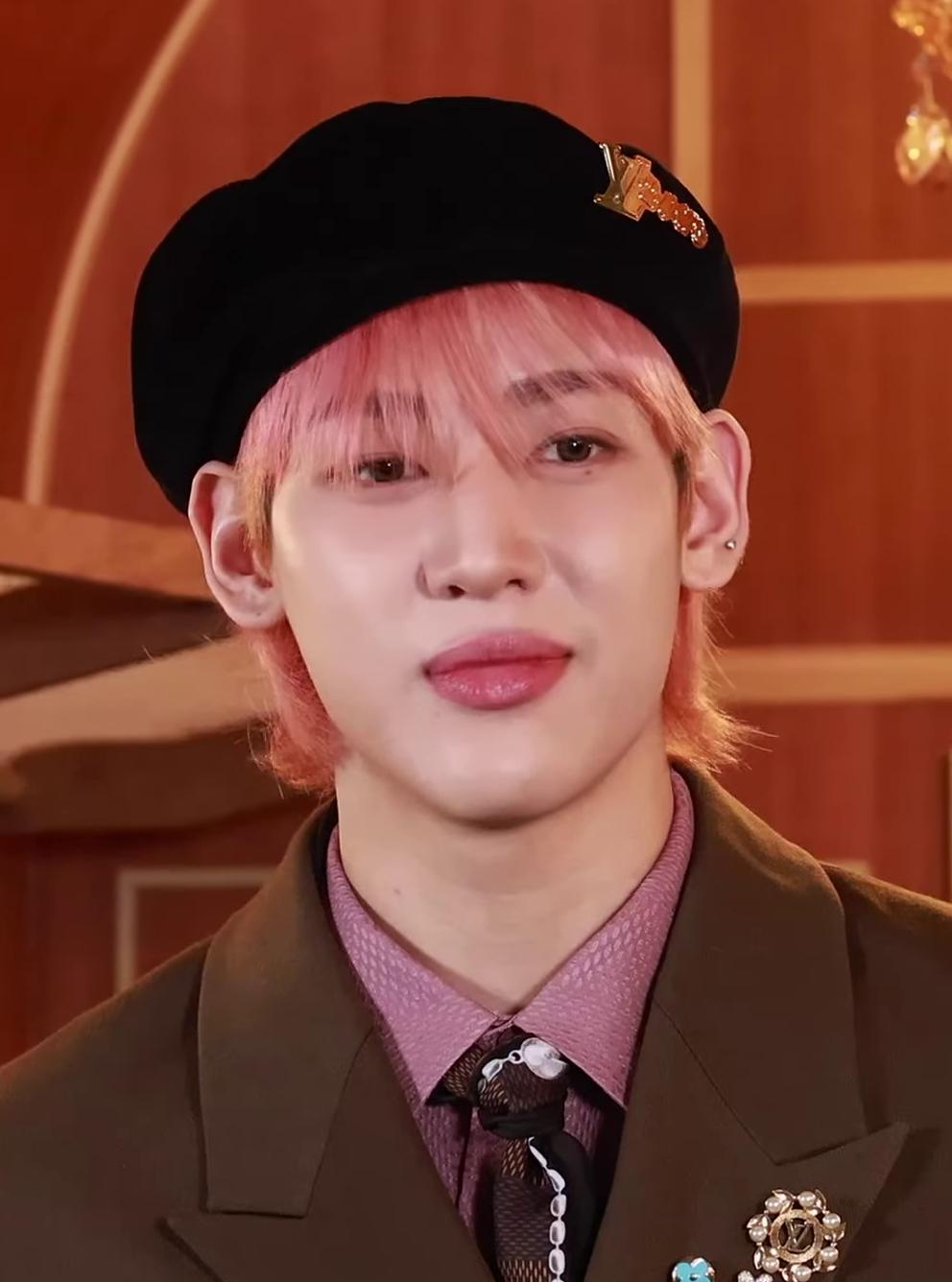
- BamBam in March 2025
- Born: Kasidech Bhuwakul; May 2, 1997 (age 29); Bangkok, Thailand
- Occupations: Rapper; singer
- Musical career
- Genres: Hip hop; K-pop; dance
- Years active: 2014–present
- Labels: JYP; Abyss Company; Halo Corporation
- Member of: Got7
- Website: Official website

Kunpimook Bhuwakul (Thai: กันต์พิมุกต์ ภูวกุล; RTGS: Kanphimuk Phuwakun; pronounced [kan pʰíʔ múk pʰuː wá kun]; born Kasidech Bhuwakul; May 2, 1997), known professionally as BamBam (แบมแบม; Korean: 뱀뱀), is a Thai rapper and singer based in South Korea, and a member of the South Korean boy band Got7.

== Early life ==
BamBam was born and raised in Bangkok, around Ram Inthra. His name is derived from Bamm-Bamm Rubble of The Flintstones. His family consists of his mother and three siblings. BamBam's father died when he was 2–3 years old, leaving the family in financial difficulty.

BamBam became interested in Korean culture and dreamt of becoming a singer because of his mother, who, as a fan of Rain, brought him to several concerts. Inspired by him, he started learning to dance and sing when he was 10, and was part of the dance crew We Zaa Cool with Lisa of Blackpink. He won the first prize in Thailand Rain Cover Dance Competition in 2007, and placed second in Thailand LG Entertainer Competition in 2010. When he was 13, he passed JYP World Tour Audition in Thailand, and moved to South Korea to become a trainee.

On April 9, 2018, BamBam returned to Thailand for the military draft, and was exempted from serving due to the combined volunteer and red card recruit quota being reached in his region.

He attended Saiaksorn Elementary School and Pramoch Witthaya Raminthra High School, from which he graduated in January 2020.

== Career ==
=== 2014–2020: Debut and solo activities ===
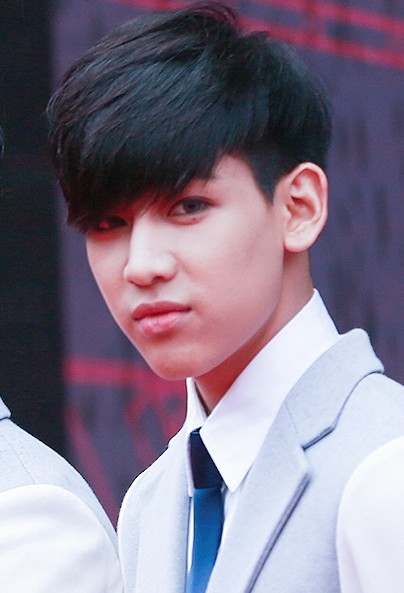
BamBam in 2015

He trained under JYP Entertainment for about three and a half years before his debut in Got7. His first pre-debut appearance was on an episode of Mnet's reality-survival program WIN: Who Is Next, which aired on September 6, 2013. BamBam alongside his future bandmates Mark Tuan, Jackson Wang and Yugyeom, and Young K, Jae Park, Wonpil, Sungjin, Junhyeok of Day6 were competing against the YG Entertainment trainees, Team A and Team B, that later debuted as Winner and iKon respectively.

Got7's debut song "Girls Girls Girls" and the music video for the track were released on January 16, 2014. In 2016, BamBam and Jackson appeared on the South Korean variety show Real Men for a special episode with the theme of "Enlisting Together". BamBam and Jinyoung were made permanent hosts for Mnet's M Countdown alongside Key of Shinee from March 2015 to March 2016.

In 2017, BamBam produced the lyric video for Got7's song "You Are" from the group's seventh mini-album 7 for 7. On April 7, 2017, he released the single "Make It Right" for Yamaha Thailand's motorcycle qbix. He collaborated with Thai artists Jayjay Kritsanapoom, Best Nathasit, Mild Wiraporn, Captain Chonlathorn, and Ud Awat.

On September 28, 2018, he shared a self-directed, self-edited video titled "My Year 2018" on Got7's official YouTube account to thank fans for their support.

In the spring of 2019, he joined Jus2 in their 'Focus' Premiere Showcase in Asia, acting as the MC for Jakarta (April 21) and Bangkok (April 27 to 28) stops.

On September 23, 2019, he published a self-filmed, directed and edited video titled "Feel It, See It" on Got7's official YouTube account, which features moments from the group's tour in America. On October 15, 2019, Thai rapper F. Hero released his album Into the New Era featuring a collaboration with BamBam titled "Do You".

In 2020, he sang his first OST, "I'm Not a Con-Heartist" (พี่ไม่หล่อลวง), for Thai movie The Con-Heartist. The song was released on November 16, and BamBam composed and produced it alongside Psycho Tension.

=== 2021–2024: Departure from JYPE, solo music and world tour ===
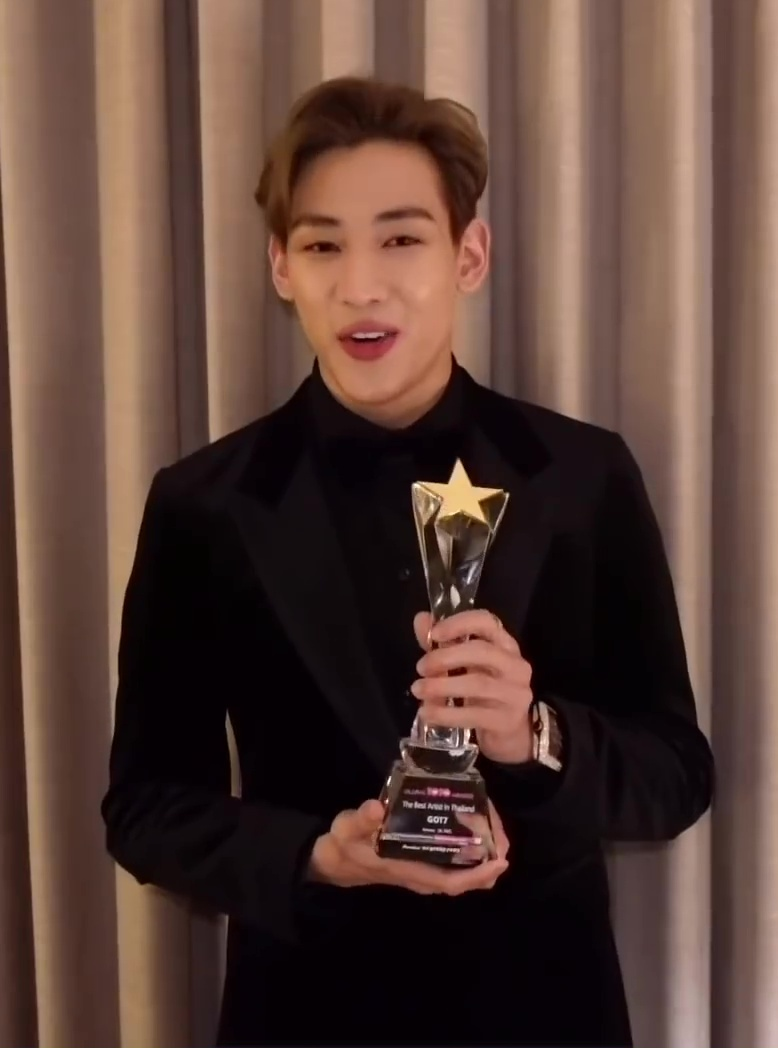
BamBam in February 2021

On January 19, 2021, following the expiration of his contract, he left JYP Entertainment. On March 5, 2021, Abyss Company announced that BamBam had signed an exclusive contract with them. On March 16, he received the Inspirational Role Model for Youth Award at Thailand Master Youth 2020–2021 Awards. On May 17, he acted as MC for the Thai version of Simply K-Pop Con-Tour.

On June 15, 2021, he made his solo debut in South Korea with his first extended play, Ribbon, and its title track of the same name. He performed at SBS 2021 Super Concert in Daegu on October 31, and at 2021 K-Expo on November 6.

On December 28, 2021, BamBam released a new digital single, "Who Are You", featuring Seulgi from Red Velvet, which served as a pre-release for his new album. On January 7, he officially announced the release date of his second extended play, B, set for January 18. Its lead single, "Slow Mo", was released on the same day, accompanied by a "dreamlike" music video.

On April 22, 2022, BamBam released a new digital single, "Wheels Up", featuring Mayzin, under the newly established music company, Golden State Entertainment. From May 27 to May 29, he acted as MC for Mark Tuan's solo fan meeting in Thailand.

On March 28, 2023, he released his first studio album, Sour & Sweet, and the music video for the title track of the same name. He subsequently held his first world tour, Area 52, from September 19 to November 18 in South Korea, the Philippines, China, Malaysia, Vietnam, Thailand and Japan, selling out over 50,000 tickets for the Thai show at Thunderdome Stadium. He performed in South America and Europe in March 2024, while the North American leg of the tour was cancelled due to an ankle injury.

On May 4, 2024, BamBam returned to Bangkok for his The 1st World Tour "Area 52" Encore concert at Rajamangala National Stadium. The sold-out show saw the participation of Red Velvet's Seulgi, with whom he performed "Who Are You". He released his third extended play, Bamesis, on August 8.

=== 2025–present: Hometown ===
On February 6, 2025, Abyss Company and BamBam mutually agreed to conclude their exclusive contract. He subsequently signed with Halo Corporation in April. In October 2025, BamBam released his first Thai extended play, Hometown.

== Public image ==
BamBam is considered to have a great influence in both the advertising and social media fields in Thailand. Since 2017, he has endorsed eight brands in his home country, from telecommunications companies, smartphones, and e-commerce to food, clothing, and motorcycles. His account on Twitter was Thailand's most mentioned entertainment account in 2019.

== Other ventures ==
=== Fashion ===
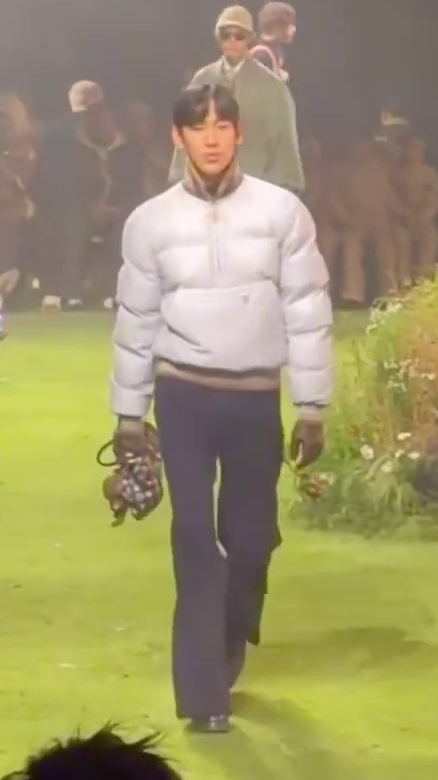
BamBam walking the catwalk for Louis Vuitton 2026 F/W collection

On December 5, 2017, BamBam launched his first clothing line, titled doubleB, in collaboration with Represent. The limited edition design was available for purchase for two weeks and the proceeds of the campaign, which sold 13,707 items, were devolved to Water.org, a non-profit organization that provides access to safe drinking water.

On September 7, 2021, he launched a second clothing line in collaboration with Charm's. The sales period, slated to end on September 30, was extended until October 10 due to high demands. A portion of the proceeds was donated to support low-income children.

In 2021, Vogue Thailand selected BamBam as one of the 100 influencers in the fashion industry in Thailand. On June 2, he was announced as YSL Beauty's new muse.

On February 1, 2024, BamBam was announced as Louis Vuitton's newest house ambassador.

=== Philanthropy ===
In May 2019, he became the spokesman of a campaign launched by UNICEF Thailand and the Ministry of Social Development and Human Security against children abuse, and in September, he donated 100,000 baht to help children affected by the flood in Ubon Ratchathani province.

In 2020, he continued his partnership with UNICEF Thailand, taking part in its virtual concert Love Delivery Fest on May 31 to raise awareness and support for families affected by the COVID-19 pandemic, and the campaign "The Sound of Happiness" in collaboration with the Department of Mental Health and Joox Thailand, aimed at teens.

=== Endorsements ===
In 2020, BamBam was selected as the face of the new 5G campaign by AIS, the major mobile network operator in Thailand, along with Blackpink's Lisa. On November 10, 2020, he became the new ambassador for the life simulation video-game The Sims 4, while on December 14, he released a new song, "Beat Your Best", to promote BK drinks.

On January 8, 2022, BamBam was selected as global ambassador for the NBA's Golden State Warriors. He then released the song "Wheels Up", featuring Oakland-based rapper Mayzin, during halftime of the Warriors' home game against the Los Angeles Lakers at Chase Center in San Francisco on April 7. He also partnered with Golden State, New Style Media Group and Fanatics on limited-edition T-shirts, sweatshirts and other merchandise.

On August 11, 2022, Toyota Motor Thailand launched his new Yaris bringing in BamBam as a presenter. In 2023, he was selected as Mind Bridge Youth line 23FW ambassador in South Korea. In January 2024, BamBam became Xiaomi Redmi Note 13 series Southeast Asia ambassador.

In 2026, BamBam was chosen as brand ambassador for Thai perfume brand Janua's Scents of Soul Collection, whose first batch of 300,000 bottles sold out within a month of its launch, and signed a partnership with Adidas Thailand.

== Discography ==
=== Studio albums ===
Title	Details	Peak chart positions	Sales
Title	Details	KOR	Sales
Sour & Sweet	Released: March 28, 2023; Label: Abyss Company; Formats: CD, digital download, streaming	3	KOR: 103,377

=== Extended plays ===
Title	Details	Peak chart positions	Sales
Title	Details	KOR	Sales
Ribbon	Released: June 15, 2021; Label: Abyss Company; Formats: CD, digital download, streaming	2	KOR: 134,845
B	Released: January 18, 2022; Label: Abyss Company; Formats: CD, digital download, streaming	5	KOR: 100,975
Bamesis	Released: August 8, 2024; Label: Abyss Company; Formats: CD, digital download, streaming	2	KOR: 110,518
Hometown	Released: October 10, 2025; Label: Halo Corporation; Formats: CD, digital download, streaming	9	KOR: 81,000

=== Singles ===
Title	Year	Peak chart positions			Album
Title	Year	THA	KOR	US World	Album
As lead artist
"Make It Right" (featuring Jaylerr, Best Nathasit, Mild, Captain Chonlathorn, and Ud Awat)	2017	—	—	—	Non-album singles
"I'm Not a Con-Heartist" (พี่ไม่หล่อลวง)	2020	—	—	—	Non-album singles
"Beat Your Best"	2020	—	—	—	Non-album singles
"Ribbon"	2021	—	144	17	Ribbon
"Who Are You" (featuring Seulgi of Red Velvet)	2021	—	— (Note: "Who Are You" did not enter the Gaon Digital Chart but peaked at number 28 on the component Download Chart.)	9	B
"Slow Mo"	2022	—	132	—	B
"Skrrt" (with F.Hero featuring Youngohm)	2022	—	—	—	Non-album singles
"Wheels Up" (featuring Mayzin)	2022	—	—	—	Non-album singles
"Sour & Sweet"	2023	—	100	—	Sour & Sweet
"Our Story Never Ends" (with Ailynn, Billkin, Ink Waruntorn, Milli, Nont Tanont, PP Krit)	2023	—	—	—	Non-album singles
"Pick It"	2023	—	—	—	Non-album singles
"Last Parade"	2024	—	115	—	Bamesis
"Dancing By Myself" (ไม่มีใครสักคืน) (featuring Timethai)	2025	—	—	—	Hometown
"Wondering"	2025	17	—	—	Hometown
"Ready for MORE" (ไปอีก) (with Nadech)	2026	—	—	—	Non-album singles
"Carry You" (with Minnie)	2026	—	—	—	Non-album singles
As featured artist
"Do You" (F. Hero featuring BamBam)	2019	—	—	—	Into the New Era
"T2T" (Timethai featuring BamBam)	2025	—	—	—	Non-album single
Soundtrack appearances
"Melting"	2022	—	— (Note: "Melting" did not enter the Gaon Digital Chart but peaked at number 53 on the component Download Chart.)	—	Business Proposal OST
"—" denotes releases that did not chart or were not released in that region.

=== Songwriting credits ===
All song credits are adapted from the Korea Music Copyright Association's database, unless otherwise noted.

Year	Artist	Title	Album	Lyrics		Music	
Year	Artist	Title	Album	Credited	With	Credited	With
2015	Got7	"Everyday" (매일)	Mad: Winter Edition	Yes	Defsoul (JB), Cho Wool of Princess Disease	No	—N/a
2016	Got7	"See the Light" (빛이나)	Flight Log: Departure	Yes	Yugyeom, Mark Tuan, Frants	No	—N/a
2016	Got7	"Something Good"	Flight Log: Departure	Yes	Defsoul (JB)	No	—N/a
2016	Got7	"Feel My Vibe" (Note: "Feel My Vibe" was performed at 2016 Fly Concert Tour.)	Non-commercial single	Yes	Jackson Wang, Boytoy	No	—N/a
2016	Got7	"No Jam" (노잼)	Flight Log: Turbulence	Yes	Mark, Frants, Yugyeom, Jackson	No	—N/a
2016	Got7	"If" (만약에)	Flight Log: Turbulence	Yes	Primeboi, Mark	No	—N/a
2016	Got7	"Dreamin'" (니꿈꿔)	Flight Log: Turbulence	Yes	Earattack, Defsoul (JB)	No	—N/a
2017	Got7	"Shopping Mall"	Flight Log: Arrival	Yes	Earattack, Defsoul (JB), Jackson, Mark	No	—N/a
2017	Got7	"Paradise"	Flight Log: Arrival	Yes	Jinyoung, Distract	No	—N/a
2017	Got7	"Go Higher"	Flight Log: Arrival	Yes	Earattack, Defsoul (JB), Jackson, Mark	No	—N/a
2017	Got7	"Moon U"	7 for 7	Yes	Ars (Youngjae), Joo Chan-yang, Maxx Song	No	—N/a
2017	Got7	"Remember You"	7 for 7	Yes	Lee Ha-jin	Yes	Images
2017	Got7	"Face"	7 for 7	Yes	Lee Woomin 'collapsedone', Mayu Wakisaka, Jackson, Mark	No	—N/a
2017	Got7	"97 Young & Rich"	Turn Up	Yes	Yugyeom, Frants, Simon	Yes	Yugyeom, Frants
2018	Got7	"The Reason"	Eyes on You	Yes	Lee Ha-jin	Yes	Images
2018	Got7	"Party"	Present: You	Yes		Yes	Frants
2018	Got7	"WOLO"	Present: You & Me	Yes	Jackson, Yugyeom	No	—N/a
2018	Got7	"King"	Present: You & Me	Yes	Jinyoung	Yes	Jinyoung, Frants
2018	Got7	"Nightmare" (Note: "Nightmare" was performed at Mnet Asian Music Awards 2018 and Got7 fifth anniversary fanmeeting in January 2019.)	Non-commercial single	Yes	Jackson, Mark	No	—N/a
2019	Got7	"Cold"	I Won't Let You Go	Yes	Simon	Yes	Frants
2019	Got7	"Believe" (믿어줄래)	Spinning Top: Between Security and Insecurity	Yes	Tommy Park	Yes	Frants
2020	Got7	"God Has Return + Mañana"	Dye	Yes	Jackson, Mark	Yes	Frants
2020	BamBam	"I'm Not a Con-Heartist" (พี่ไม่หล่อลวง)	Non-album single	No	—N/a	Yes	Psycho Tension
2020	Got7	"Waiting For You"	Breath of Love: Last Piece	Yes	Psycho Tension	Yes	Psycho Tension
2021	BamBam	"Pandora"	Ribbon	Yes	Earattack, Lee Ha-jin, Hwang Yoo-bin	No	—N/a
2021	BamBam	"Ribbon"	Ribbon	Yes	Jo Yoon-kyung, Lee Ha-jin, Earattack, Luke	Yes	Peter Chun, Andreas Carlsson, Drew Scott, Ryan Kim, Earattack
2021	BamBam	"Look So Fine"	Ribbon	Yes	Lee Ha-jin, Earattack	Yes	Earattack
2021	BamBam	"Air"	Ribbon	Yes	Chris LaRocca, Bryan Chong	Yes	Chris LaRocca, Bryan Chong
2021	BamBam	"Under the Sky"	Ribbon	Yes	Lee Ha-jin	No	—N/a
2022	BamBam	"Intro: Satellites"	B	Yes	Dougie F, Bryan Chong	No	—N/a
2022	BamBam	"Who Are You"	B	Yes	Lee Seu-ran, Lee Ha-jin, Grey (Kyle Trewartha, Michael Trewartha), Mikael Temrowski, Livvi Franc	No	—N/a
2022	BamBam	"Slow Mo"	B	Yes	Lee Seu-ran, Pink Sweat$, Jayson DeZuzio	No	—N/a
2022	BamBam	"Let Me Love You"	B	Yes	Jimmy Brown	No	—N/a
2022	BamBam	"Ride or Die"	B	Yes	Lee Seu-ran, Earattack	No	—N/a
2023	BamBam	"Feather"	Sour & Sweet	Yes	Jimmy Brown	No	—N/a
2023	BamBam	"Take It Easy"	Sour & Sweet	Yes	Kyle Reynolds, Brandyn Robert Burnette, Nicholas Henriqeus, Garrison Webster, Jawon Daniels	Yes	Kyle Reynolds, Brandyn Robert Burnette, Nicholas Henriqeus, Garrison Webster, Jawon Daniels
2023	BamBam	"Ghost"	Sour & Sweet	Yes	Adam Halliday, De'La, Sean Fischer, Lee Seu-ran	Yes	Adam Halliday, De'La, Sean Fischer
2023	BamBam	"Sour & Sweet"	Sour & Sweet	Yes	Jade.J, Kyle Reynolds, Emily Rebecca Vaughn, Jonathan Santana	Yes	Kyle Reynolds, Emily Rebecca Vaughn, Jonathan Santana
2023	BamBam	"About You"	Sour & Sweet	Yes	Hwang Yoo-bin, Higher Baby, Marty Valentine	No	—N/a
2023	BamBam	"Tippy Toe"	Sour & Sweet	Yes	Adam Halliday, De'La, Bekah Novi	Yes	Adam Halliday, De'La, Bekah Novi
2023	BamBam	"Wings"	Sour & Sweet	Yes	Jade.J, Adam Halliday, Dillon Deskin	Yes	Adam Halliday, Dillon Deskin
2024	BamBam	"Last Parade"	Bamesis	Yes	—N/a	Yes	Joopepe, Lee Sang-chul, Earattack, Rik Annema, Cimo Fränkel
2024	BamBam	"Mi Último Deseo"	Bamesis	Yes	—N/a	No	Alejandra Alberti, Duck Blackwell, Storii
2024	BamBam	"Must Be Nice"	Bamesis	Yes	—N/a	Yes	Jung Sung-min, Kes Kross
2024	BamBam	"Thank You Come Again"	Bamesis	Yes	—N/a	Yes	Derrick Milano, Arial Imani
2025	Got7	"Python"	Winter Heptagon	Yes	Kyle Reynolds, Joopepe, Nick Lee, Jason Fox, Samik "Symphony" Ganguly	Yes	Kyle Reynolds, Nick Lee, Jason Fox, Samik "Symphony" Ganguly
2025	Got7	"Tidal Wave"	Winter Heptagon	No	—N/a	Yes	Chris LaRocca, Herag Sanbalian, Bryan Chong
2025	Got7	"Yours Truly", (우리가할수있는말은.)	Winter Heptagon	Yes	Got7	No	—N/a
2025	BamBam	"Dancing By Myself" (ไม่มีใครสักคืน)	Hometown	Yes	Tytan, Smew, Adam Halliday, Cody Tarpley, Avedon	Yes	Adam Halliday, Cody Tarpley, Avedon, Jeong Seongmin (Psycho Tension)
2025	BamBam	"More Than Friend" (มากกว่าfriend)	Hometown	Yes	Tytan, Smew, Jeff Satur, Ebby Marango, Shanks., Jacks Lawson, Eli Brown	Yes	Jeff Satur, Ebby Marango, Shanks., Jacks Lawson, Eli Brown, Jeong Seongmin (Psycho Tension)
2025	BamBam	"Wondering"	Hometown	Yes	Tytan, Smew, Kyle Reynolds, Michael Fatkin, Shy Martin	Yes	Kyle Reynolds, Michael Fatkin, Shy Martin, Jeong Seongmin (Psycho Tension)
2025	BamBam	"Greenlight" (ไฟเขียว)	Hometown	Yes	Tytan, Smew, Kyle Reynolds, Michael Fatkin, Shy Martin	Yes	Kyle Reynolds, Michael Fatkin, Shy Martin, Jeong Seongmin (Psycho Tension)
2025	BamBam	"Angel in Disguise"	Hometown	Yes	Pharrell Williams, Tytan, Smew	Yes	Pharrell Williams, Jeong Seongmin (Psycho Tension)
2026	BamBam, Nadech	"Ready for MORE" (ไปอีก)	Non-album single	Yes	Tytan, Smew, Bekah Novi, Benicio Bryant	Yes	Ruwanga Samath, Jeong Seongmin (Psycho Tension)

== Filmography ==
=== Films ===
Year	Title	Role	Notes	Ref.
2012	Fairy Tale Killer	Wong Wai-han's son	Hong Kong horror film	
2016	Sanctuary	BamBam	Thai short film	
2026	Confessions of a Shaman	Yos	Cameo appearance	

=== TV series ===
Year	Title	Role	Notes	Ref.
2015	Dream Knight	Himself	Korean-Chinese online drama by JYPE and Youku Tudou	
2016	Don't Dare to Dream	Guy at Thai bar	Cameo (Episode 1)	

=== Television shows ===
Year	Title	Role	Notes	Ref.
2013	WIN: Who is Next	Contestant	Rap and dance battle (Episode 4)	
2015	My Young Tutor	Cast		
2015	BamMin TV	Host	with 15&'s Park Ji-min, 12 episodes	
2016	Real Men	Cast member	with Got7's Jackson	
2017	I Can See Your Voice	Cast member	with Got7's Mark, Youngjae, Yugyeom, Jinyoung and JB	
2017	I Can See Your Voice Thailand	Cast member	with Got7's Mark, Youngjae and Yugyeom	
2019	Got7 Real Thai	Cast member	with Got7's Mark, Youngjae and Jinyoung	
2022	Rustically: In the Secret Island	Cast member		
2022	Seven Stars	Mentor	Thai audition program	
2022	Transit Love 2	Panelist	Episode 10 - Episode 20	
2023	Master in the House	Cast member	Episode 239–254	
2023	Business Genius Baeksajang	Cast member		
2024	My Sibling's Romance	Panelist		
2025	Chuang Asia: Season 2	Mentor		
2026	Idol's Table	Cast member		

=== Hosting ===
Year	Title	Notes	Ref.
2015–2016	M Countdown	with Lee Jung-shin, Shinee's Key, and Got7's Jinyoung	
2016	Battle Likes	with Got7's Mark (Episodes 1–2)	
2017	K-Rush	with Woo Hye-rim (Episodes 5–8)	
2021	41st Blue Dragon Film Awards	with Park Shin-young (red carpet walk)	
2021	2021 Asia Song Festival	with Sandara Park	
2023	KCON 2023 Thailand	with Minnie (March 18 to 19)	
2024	33rd Seoul Music Awards	with Lee Seung-gi, Tiffany, and Got7's Youngjae	
2026	X The League	with Tiffany	

=== Music videos ===
Year	Title	Artist(s)	Director	Notes	Ref.
2017	"Make It Right"	BamBam feat. Jaylerr Krissanapoom, Best Nathasit, Mild, Captain Chonlathorn, and Ud Awat		Promotional song for Yamaha	
2018	"Party"	Got7	Naive Creative Production	Solo song from Got7's album Present: You	
2019	"Do You"	F. Hero feat. BamBam			
2020	"I'm Not a Con-Heartist" (พี่ไม่หล่อลวง)	BamBam	Chayanop Boonprakob	The Con-Heartist OST	
2021	"Ribbon"	BamBam	Highqualityfish		
2021	"Who Are You"	BamBam feat. Seulgi of Red Velvet	Hobin		
2022	"Slow Mo"	BamBam			
2022	"Melting"	BamBam		Business Proposal OST	
2024	"Last Parade"	BamBam	Seong Wonmo		
2025	"Dancing By Myself" (ไม่มีใครสักคืน)	BamBam feat. Timethai	Samson (Highqualityfish)		
2025	"Wondering"	BamBam	Samson (Highqualityfish)		
2026	"Ready for MORE" (ไปอีก)	BamBam and Nadech			
2026	"Carry You"	BamBam and Minnie			

== Awards and nominations ==
Name of award ceremony, year presented, award category, nominee of award, and result of nomination
Award ceremony	Year	Category	Nominee(s)/work(s)	Result	Ref.
Asia Artist Awards	2021	Popularity Award (Male Solo Singer)	BamBam	Nominated	
Asia Artist Awards	2021	U+Idol Live Popularity Award (Male Solo Singer)	BamBam	Nominated	
Asia Artist Awards	2021	Best Artist Award (Singer)	BamBam	Won	
Asia Artist Awards	2021	Asia Celebrity Award (Singer)	BamBam	Won	
Asia Artist Awards	2022	Idolplus Popularity Award (Singer)	BamBam	Nominated	
Asia Artist Awards	2023	Popularity Award (Male Singer)	BamBam	Nominated	
Asia Artist Awards	2024	Popularity Award (Male Singer)	BamBam	Nominated	
Asia Top Awards	2025	International Award – Asia Inspiration Artist	BamBam	Won	
Blue Dragon Series Awards	2023	Best New Male Entertainer	Transit Love 2	Nominated	
Brand Customer Loyalty Awards	2023	Entertainment Idol (Male)	BamBam	Nominated	
Daradaily Awards	2019	Male Popularity Vote Award	BamBam	Won	
Great Stars Awards	2017	Male Social Super Star of the Year	BamBam	Won	
Great Stars Awards	2018	Male Social Super Star of the Year	BamBam	Won	
Hanteo Music Awards	2022	Artist of the Year	BamBam	Nominated	
Joox Thailand Music Awards	2020	Social Superstar	BamBam	Won	
Joox Thailand Music Awards	2021	Song of the Year	"I'm Not a Con-Heartist"	Won	
Korea First Brand Awards	2025	Variety Show Idol (Male)	BamBam	Won	
Line TV Awards	2021	Line TV Best Thai Song	"I'm Not a Con-Heartist"	Nominated	
Line Melody Music Charts	2021	Black Melody Award for Most Downloaded Song (July)	"Ribbon"	Won	
Line Melody Music Charts	2021	Melody of the Year	"Ribbon"	Won	
MChoice & Mint Awards	2022	The Inspiration Award	BamBam	Won	
MChoice & Mint Awards	2024	Entertainment Program of the Year	The 1st World Tour "Area 52" Encore	Won	
Sanook Top of the Year Awards	2025	Sanook Top of the Year (Popular Vote)	BamBam	Nominated	
Seoul Music Awards	2024	The Best Award (Bonsang)	Sour & Sweet	Nominated	
Seoul Music Awards	2024	The Popularity Award	BamBam	Nominated	
Seoul Music Awards	2024	Male Solo Artist Award	BamBam	Nominated	
Seoul Music Awards	2024	Global Producer Award	BamBam	Won	
Spotify Wrapped Live Indonesia	2023	Indonesian Most Pick 2023	BamBam	Won	
Suphannahong National Film Awards	2021	Best Original Song	"I'm Not a Con-Heartist"	Nominated	
T-Pop of the Year Music Awards	2025	Best Music Video of the Year	"Dancing By Myself"	Nominated	
T-Pop of the Year Music Awards	2025	Most Popular Male of the Year	BamBam	Nominated	
Thailand Headlines Person of the Year Awards	2025	The Most Internationally Influential Singer Award	BamBam	Won	
Thailand Master Youth Awards	2021	Inspirational Role Model for Youth Award	BamBam	Won	
Thailand Social Awards	2026	Best Entertainment Figures Performance on Social Media – Solo Male Artist	BamBam	Won	
The People Awards	2026	Popular of the Year	BamBam	Longlisted	

=== Listicles ===
Name of publisher, year listed, name of listicle, and placement
Publisher	Year	Listicle	Placement	Ref.
Tatler Asia	2023	Asia's Most Influential – Entertainment (Thailand)	Placed	
Tatler Asia	2024	Asia's Most Influential – Entertainment (Thailand)	Placed	
