= The Little Comedian =

2010 Thai film

- Film poster
- Thai: บ้านฉัน..ตลกไว้ก่อน (พ่อสอนไว้)
- Directed by: Witthaya Thongyooyong; Mez Tharatorn
- Written by: Aummaraporn Phandintong; Mez Tharatorn
- Based on: Tam Mai Tong Talok by Witthaya Thongyooyong
- Produced by: Jira Maligool; Chenchonnee Suntonsaratoon; Suwimon Techasupinun; Vanridee Pongsittisak
- Starring: Chawinroj Likitcharoensakul; Paula Taylor; Jaturong Mokjok; Nichapat Charurattanawaree; Kwanjit Sriprajan; Tee Doksadao
- Cinematography: Narupon Sohkkanapituk
- Edited by: Thammarat Sumetsupachok
- Music by: Hualampong Riddim (soundtrack); Thanakrit Panichwid (performance)
- Distributed by: GTH
- Release date: 11 March 2010
- Running time: 118 minutes
- Country: Thailand
- Language: Thai
- Box office: ฿42 million

The Little Comedian (Thai: บ้านฉัน..ตลกไว้ก่อน (พ่อสอนไว้), romanized: Baan Chan Talok Wai Korn (Por Son Wai); lit. 'My Home..Funny First (Dad Taught)') is a 2010 GTH's Thai family and comedy film directed and written by Witthaya Thongyooyong and Mez Tharatorn.

== Plot ==
Tok is a soon to be 13 year old boy who boy has a lot to live up to. Not only is he named after Thailand's comedian 'Lor Tok', but he also is a descendant of a long lineage of comedians. There's one problem though: Tok just isn't funny and his father is starting to realize this. Tok struggles to come up with new gags in attempt to earn his father's respect. With all this pressure, Tok develops pimples. Afraid of acne, he consults a dermatologist, Mo Namkhaeng, whom he falls in love with at first sight.

== Cast ==
- Chawinroj Likitcharoensakul as Tok (also spelled Tock)
- Paula Taylor as Mo Namkhaeng (Dr. Ice)
- Jaturong Mokjok as Ploen (Tok's father)
- Orn-anong Panyawong as Cheun (Tok's mother)
- Nichapat Charurattanawaree as Mon/ Salmon (Tok's young sister)
- Kwanjit Sriprajan as Grandma
- Tee Doksadao as Cham
- Tik Gangkhaopun as Ruammitr
- Sripare Sidao as Thongkorn
- Top Dokkradone as Yodson
- Anna Chuancheun as Pipo

== Production ==
The Little Comedian is a film developed from a short film titled Tam Mai Tong Talok (ทำไมต้องตลก; Why funny) of Witthaya Thongyooyong one of the directors and screenwriters. The film uses Lop Buri as a backdrop and is the location for filming almost the whole story.

The film was released on March 11, 2010 and earning a total of 42 million baht, which is considered not very successful, it aired on Channel 7 on June 1, 2013 and December 30, 2018.
