= Ribbon (EP) =

- Digital cover

EP by BamBam
- Released: June 15, 2021
- Recorded: 2021
- Studio: Abyss Company
- Genres: Hip hop; trap; R&B
- Length: 18:23
- Languages: Korean; English
- Label: Abyss Company

BamBam chronology
Ribbon (2021)	B (2022)

Singles from Ribbon
- 1. "Ribbon" Released: June 15, 2021

Ribbon (stylized as riBBon) is the first extended play by South Korea-based Thai rapper and singer BamBam. It was released on June 15, 2021.

== Background and release ==
Abyss Company announced BamBam's debut as a soloist in South Korea on May 24, 2021. The following day, they revealed he would release an extended play titled Ribbon. Ten sets of photos were released between May 26 and June 8, centering on the symbolic object of the ribbon. The tracklist was disclosed on June 9, while the EP and the music video of the title track "Ribbon" were released on June 15.

== Music and lyrics ==
The theme of Ribbon is rebirth, and the title is a word play with English words "ribbon" and "reborn," which are written as 리본 (ribon) in Korean, and thus homophone. It contains a message of hope, and BamBam's wish to better himself. Ribbon was also based on the Greek mith of Pandora's box, which spread calamities to the world, but also hope, with the latter symbolized by the ribbon.

The EP consists of an airy lo-fi rhythm instrumental intro, produced by Murda Beatz, and other five tracks, with BamBam co-writing all the lyrics. He also took part in the composition of half of the songs. The homonymous title track, which blends trap and hip hop, was created with the meaning of starting anew as a solo singer, presenting "a hopeful and joyous new version of himself." Talking about "Ribbon", BamBam said "I wanted to make a song that makes me feel a little better while listening to it in the morning when I go to work. This song goes well with the bright image of BamBam."

"Pandora" is a hip hop track with a simple bass loop, in which, after opening Pandora's box, BamBam sings about dealing with his enemies without fear to achieve his goals. "Look So Fine" is a funky dance piece expressing his confidence in front of others, not minding about how the world sees him. On the other hand, "Air" and "Under the Sky" are more laid back: the first, a tropical house tune, is completely in English and describes how being in love and missing your lover makes you feel like running out of air, while the latter is an R&B ballad that sees BamBam expressing the preciousness and gratitude for the past with lyrics such as "The memories I have of those days / The times we cried and laughed / Shaped us into who we are today" (기억 속의 모든 날이 / 울고 웃던 시간들이 / 지금의 우리를 다 만들어 준거라). It was written while reflecting on Got7's departure from JYP Entertainment in January 2021 and the fans' feelings.

== Promotions ==
BamBam presented Ribbon and performed "Ribbon", "Pandora" and "Air" during an online showcase aired on June 15 on YouTube, V Live, Shopping Live, and Facebook, and which was watched by more than 740,000 people. He then promoted the title track and "Pandora" on music shows such as M! Countdown, Music Bank, Show! Music Core, Inkigayo, The Show and Show Champion from June 17 to June 27.

== Critical reception ==
Professional ratings
Review scores
Source	Rating
NME	3/5 stars

Writing for Rolling Stone India, Divyansha Dongre said that the title song "Ribbon" "underlines the rapper's gleeful persona and style with lyrics embodying a strong metaphorical reference to that of a ribbon, subtly hinting towards BamBam's evolution as a musician." EnVi Magazine noted that each track showcases the singer's versatility. On the other hand, NME gave the EP three stars out of five, stating that BamBam "still has a long way to go in defining his personal music style."

== Commercial performance ==
Upon release, Ribbon debuted at #2 in South Korea on the Gaon Weekly Album Chart, while the title track "Ribbon" entered the Gaon Digital Chart at #144 and ranked #17 on Billboard World Digital Song Sales Chart.

It ranked seventh on Gaon Monthly Album Chart for June 2021 with 103,156 copies sold, while it entered the Yearly Album Chart at #77 with 134,845 copies.

"Ribbon" received the Black Melody Award for Most Downloaded Song in the first ten days of July 2021 from Line Melody Music Charts in Thailand.

== Track listing ==
No.	Title	Lyrics	Music	Arrangement	Length
1.	"Intro"		Shane Lindstrom	Murda Beatz; Mars	2:22
2.	"Pandora"	BamBam; Earattack; Lee Ha-jin; Hwang Yoo-bin	Earattack; Chan's; Gong-do	Earattack; Chan's; Gong-do	3:04
3.	"Ribbon"	BamBam; Jo Yoon-kyung; Lee Ha-jin; Earattack; Luke	BamBam; Peter Chun; Andreas Carlsson; Drew Scott; Ryan Kim; Earattack	Earattack; Peter Chun; Andreas Carlsson; Drew Scott; Ryan Kim; Gong-do	3:07
4.	"Look So Fine"	BamBam; Earattack; Lee Ha-jin	BamBam; Earattack	Earattack; Lee Woo-hyun	2:40
5.	"Air"	BamBam; Chris LaRocca; Bryan Chong	BamBam; Chris LaRocca; Bryan Chong	Murda Beatz; Maneesh	2:55
6.	"Under the Sky"	BamBam; Lee Ha-jin	Jo Gwang-ho; Park Seo-hyun (Psycho Tension)	Psycho Tension (Jung Sung-min, Doo)	4:15
Total length:					18:23

== Charts ==
=== Weekly charts ===
Weekly chart performance for Ribbon
Chart (2021)	Peak position
South Korean Albums (Gaon)	2

=== Year-end charts ===
Year-end chart performance for Ribbon
Chart (2021)	Position
South Korean Albums (Gaon)	77
