= Orn-anong Panyawong =

Thai actress, beauty queen, and Miss Thailand 1992 winner (born 1972)

- อรอนงค์ ปัญญาวงศ์
- Born: Orn-anong Panyawong; December 27, 1972 (age 53); Chiang Mai, Thailand
- Height: 5 ft 6 in (1.68 m)
- Beauty pageant titleholder
- Title: Miss Thailand 1992
- Hair color: Black
- Eye color: Black
- Major competitions: Miss Thailand 1992 (winner); Miss Universe 1992 (Unplaced)

Orn-anong Panyawong (Thai: อรอนงค์ ปัญญาวงศ์), nicknamed Orn (Thai: อร) (born December 27, 1972 in Chiang Mai, Thailand) is a Thai actress and beauty pageant titleholder who won Miss Thailand 1992. She competed in Miss Universe 1992 pageant competition held in Thailand.

== Filmography ==
=== Television dramas ===
- 1991 (นางเสือง) (Dara Video/Ch.7) as (นางเสือง) with Billy Ogan
- 1992 (ละครเร่) (Dara Video/Ch.7) as Kratin (กระถิน) with Bodin Duke
- 1992 Fan Long Rudoo Naw (ฝันหลงฤดู) (Dara Video/Ch.7) as () with Bodin Duke
- 1994 Thawiphop (ทวิภพ) (Dara Video/Ch.7) as Prayong (ประยงค์)
- 1995 Dao Tame Din (ดาวแต้มดิน) (Dara Video/Ch.7) as Parita (Bee) (ปริตตา (บี๋))
- 1995 Prasart See Khao (ปราสาทสีขาว) (Dara Video/Ch.7) as ()
- 1997 Karakade (การะเกด) (Dara Video/Ch.7) as Princess Kedsaree (เจ้าหญิงเกษรี)
- 1997 Niramit (นิรมิต) (Dara Video/Ch.7) as Maturee (Whan) (มธุรี (หวาน) (รับเชิญ))
- 1997 Mai Yor Tor Morasum (ไม่ย่อท้อมรสุม) (/Ch.5) as ()
- 1998 Prathip Athithan (ประทีปอธิษฐาน) (Akara Media/Ch.9) as () with Songsit Roongnophakunsri
- 1998 (เศรษฐีอนาถา) (TV Thunder/Ch.3) as ()
- 1999 (พ่อ ตอน เทียนขี้ผึ้ง) (Level 5-Production Tang 6/Ch.5) as Nanfon (น้ำฝน)
- 2000 Nam Pueng Kom (น้ำผึ้งขม) (TV Scene & Picture/Ch.3) as Saengdao (Ar-Eiad) (แสงดาว (อาเอียด))
- 2000 () (/Ch.7) as ()
- 2002 () (/Ch.3) as ()
- 2003 () (/Ch.3) as ()
- 2003 () (/Ch.3) as ()
- 2003 () (/Ch.7) as ()
- 2003 () (/Ch.7) as ()
- 2005 () (/Ch.7) as ()

- 2016 Puer Tur (เพื่อเธอ) (Exact/One 31) as Darunee Thammapitak (Nee's mother) (ดรุณี ธรรมพิทักษ์ (แม่ของนี))
- 2017 Ngao Saneha (เงาเสน่หา) (RS/Ch.8) as Ka-Nang (Teelaphab's mother) (คนาง (แม่ของธีรภาพ)) with Kriengkrai Oonhanun
- 2017 Rak Nakara (รากนครา) (Act Art Generation/Ch.3) as Khian Jan (นางเขียนจันทร์)
- 2017 Waen Dok Mai 2017 (แหวนดอกไม้) (Keng Kwang Gang/GMM 25) as Dungjai (Waenpetch's mother) (ประนอม (แม่ของแหวนเพชร)) with Nukkid Boonthong
- 2019 Mia Noi (เมียน้อย) (CHANGE2561/GMM 25) as แม่ชลาธรและทานพ (Chalathorn, Thanop's mother) with Kasama Nissaipun
- 2019 Dao Lhong Fah 2019 (ดาวหลงฟ้า) (/Ch.3) as Payom (พยอม)
- 2019 Suparburoot Chao Din (สุภาพบุรุษชาวดิน) (First Class/Ch.7) as Saowapa / Aunt Angkrap (เสาวภา / แม่เลี้ยงอังกาบ)
- 2020 Roy Pah (ร้อยป่า) (Sub Entertainment/Ch.7) as Khun Ying (คุณหญิง (รับเชิญ))
- 2020 Poot Ratikarn (ภูตรัตติกาล) (/Ch.8) as Aunt Tongnoun (แม่เลี้ยงตองนวล)
- 2020 Plerng Nang (เพลิงนาง) (CHANGE2561/Amarin TV) as Riang (Plubpla's mother) (เรียง) with Dilok Thong wattana
- 2021 Wo Ai Ni Tur Tee Ruk (หว่ออ้ายหนี่เธอที่รัก) (JSL Global Media/PPTVHD36) as Mae Mu (แม่หมู)
- 2022 Pom Sanaeha (ปมเสน่หา) (Showit/Ch.3) as Lum Pang (Siriyupang's mother) (ลัมพางค์ (แม่สิริยุพางค์)) with Prakasit Bowsuwan
- 2022 Dong Dok Mai 2022 (ดงดอกไม้) (The ONE Enterprise-CHANGE2561/One 31) as Chamaiporn Worasetmetee (Chidsamai's mother) () (ชไมพร วรเศรษฐเมธี (รับเชิญ))
- 2024 Phu Langka (ภูลังกา) (The ONE Enterprise/One 31) as Janguli (พระชางคุลี)
- 2024 Bulan Mantra (บุหลันมันตรา) (Bear In Mind Studios/Ch.8) as Iam | Pharani (สนมเอี่ยม/ภรณี)
- 2025 Duangta Sawan (2025) (ดวงตาสวรรค์) (Mono Original/Monomax) as Prapha (ประภา)
- 2026 Keb Pandin 2026 (เก็บแผ่นดิน) (Paujinjong/Ch.3) as Mintra (มินตรา)

=== Television series ===
- 2008 Love Beyond Frontier (อุบัติรักข้ามขอบฟ้า) (GMMTV/Ch.9) as Orn (อรฤดี ทากาโน่ (อร) (ชื่อเก่า), อรอนงค์ จิตราสุนทร (อร) (ชื่อใหม่))
- 2009 Love Beyond Frontier 2 (2009) (อุบัติรักข้ามขอบฟ้า 2) (GMM Grammy-GMMTV/Ch.9) as Orn (อร)
- 2017 Fabulous 30: The Series (30 กำลังแจ๋วเดอะซีรีส์) (GMMTV/One 31) as Ja's mother () (แม่จ๋า (รับเชิญ))
- 2017 My Dear Loser Series Part 2 : Monster Romance (2017) (รักไม่เอาถ่าน ตอนที่ 2 Monster Romance) (GMM Grammy-GMMTV/GMM 25) as Pong's mother (แม่ป้อง)
- 2019 Bangkok Love Stories 2 Part 3: Rueng Tee Koh (Bangkok รัก Stories 2) (GMM Bravo/GMM 25) as El's mother (แม่ของแอล)
- 2022 Star and Sky: Sky in Your Heart (ขั้วฟ้าของผม) (GMMTV/GMM 25) as Prince's mother () (แม่ของปริ๊นซ์ (รับเชิญ))
- 2022 Club Friday 14: Love & Belief Ep. Love Tragedy (Club Friday the Series Love & Belief ความรักกับความเชื่อ ตอน คนกินแฟน) (CHANGE2561/One 31) as Mukrin's mother (แม่ของมุกรินทร์)
- 2022 (พาย สายน้ำแห่งความฝัน (Voice of Youth)) (D O do multimedia/Thai PBS) as Jaw (Sai Fah, Nawa's mother) (แจว (แม่ของสายฟ้าและนาวา)) with Thanayong Wongtrakul

=== Film ===
- 2003 Beautiful Boxer (บิวตี้ฟูล บ๊อกเซอร์) (GMM Pictures) as Parinya Charoenphol's mother (แม่ของน้องตุ้ม) with Nukkid Boonthong
- 2010 The Little Comedian (บ้านฉัน..ตลกไว้ก่อน (พ่อสอนไว้)) (GMM Tai Hub) as Cheun (Tok's mother) (ชื่น) with Jaturong Mokjok
- 2013 First Love (2013) (First Love รักครั้งแรก) (Sahamongkol Film) as Pim (Pak Bung's mother) (พิมพ์ (แม่ของผักบุ้ง))
- 2020 Rak Kham Kan (2020) (รักข้ามคาน) (Miss Grand International) as ()

=== MC ===
- 1996 (รายการ ยุทธการเด็ดดอกฟ้า) (Ch.9)
- 1997 (รายการ กินกับเกม) (Ch.5) (1997-1998)
- 2000 (รายการ ป๊อก ป๊อก ป๊อก) (Kantana Group/Ch.7) with Saitharn Niyomkarn, Claudia Chakrabandhu Na Ayudya, Tik Shiro (2000-2001)
- 2018 (รายการ Mom club) (MCOT/MCOT Family) with Took Chanokwanun Rakcheep (2018-2019)

Preceded by Jiraprapa Savetanand	Miss Thailand; Miss Thailand 1992	Succeeded by Chattarika Ubonsiri
