= Rak Nakara =

1998 novel by Piyaphon Sakkasem

- Author: Piyaphon Sakkasem
- Original title: รากนครา
- Language: Thai
- Set in: Early 1900s
- Publication date: 1998
- Publication place: Thailand
- ISBN: 9789746040501
- OCLC: 224108356

Rak Nakara (Thai: รากนครา) is a Thai language novel written by Piyaphon Sakkasem, and has been adapted as a Thai television drama multiple times, most recently in 2017. The storyline takes place in Northern Thailand during the reign of Chulalongkorn, and follows the romances of the Lan Na royals.

== Adaptations ==
Rak Nakara was most recently adapted as a television series in 2017. Filming took place in the Northern Thai town of Lampang. The series was initially set to air three nights a week. However, the death of Bhumibol Adulyadej forced an acceleration to the series' release schedule, and the series aired every night through its finale on October 3.

Rak Nakara
- รากนครา
- Genre: Historical, period drama
- Written by: Piyaporn Sakkasem
- Directed by: Pongpat Wachirabunjong
- Starring: Natapohn Tameeruks; Prin Suparat; Nittha Jirayungyurn; Chaiyapol Julien Poupart
- Country of origin: Thailand
- Original language: Thai
- No. of episodes: 12

Production
- Production company: Act Art

Original release
- Network: Channel 3
- Release: September 5 – October 3, 2017

== Cast ==
Years	2000	2017
Channels	Channel 7	Channel 3
Making companies	Dara Video Co., Ltd.	Act Art Generation Co., Ltd.
Screenplay	Sanlaya Sukaniwat	Yingyot Panya
Directors	Jaroon Thammasin	Pongpat Wachirabunjong
Characters	Main cast	
Jao Noi Sukhawong	Danuporn Punnakun	Prin Suparat
Princess Maenmeuang	Patcharapa Chaichua	Natapohn Tameeruks
Princess Mingla	Woranuch Bhirombhakdi	Nittha Jirayungyurn
Crown Prince	Sahaphap Weerakamin	Chaiyapol Julien Poupart
Padmasutā, Queen of Burma	Chamaiporn Jaturaput	Patcharin Judrabounpol
King of Burma	Bodin Duke	Apinan Prasertwattankul
Princess La-ongkam		Pattrakorn Tungsupakul
Characters	Supporting cast	
Jao Jak Kam	Worapot Chaem	Kummun Klomkaew
Jao Loung Sean In Tha	Nat Phoowanai	Tanakorn Posayanon
Jao Nang Khay Kam	Supansa Nuangpirom	Sueangsuda Lawanprasert
Jao Nang Ruen Kam	Rattanaporn Inthornkamhaeng	Tassawan Seneewongse Na Ayutthaya
John Brackkins	Tammachat Farnett	Thaweesak Thananan
In	Prab Yuttapichai	Wittaya Jetapai
Khian Jan	Piyamas Monyakul	Orn-anong Panyawong
Kam Kaew		Thanchanok Hongthongkam
Jao Nang Thippawan	Namthip Siamthong	
Fong Jan	Wachira Peimsuriya	Iverinr Chuenchob
Jao Loung Sri Wong	Anusorn Dechapunya	Trakarn Punthumlerdrujee
Bua Pan	Wanitha Wicharobon	Warapun Nguitragool
Min	Jirawadee Isarangkoon Na Ayutthaya	Pawanrat Naksuriya
Khin Mae	Or-rasa Isarangkoon Na Ayutthaya	Sirinuch Petchurai
Royal Palace	Kanchit Kwanpracha	Pisal Pattanapeeradej
	Ittirit Singharat	
	Thuchapon Jantawangso	
Jao Nang Bua Thip	Piyada Penjinda	
Peng	Yaowaret Nisakorn	
Bua Pad	Prapharat Rattanathada	
	Nattanan Kumpetch	
	Salinla Na Chiangmai	
Bua Thong	Patchara Thongthaweeporn	
	Patcharavadee Thongprim	
Characters	Cameo	
Jao Sing Kam	Attachai Anantameak	Warut Woratam
Gagananga Yukala	Somchai Samipak	Kriengkrai Oonhanun
Jao Sai Rat (youth, The End)	Veraparb Suparbpaiboon	Tatsapon Wiwitawan
	Tom Wisawachat	
Boon Soong	Porjed Kaenpetch	
Jao Obparach	Pongprayoon Ratcha-apai	
Sri Wi San	Sor-ranan Ror.Akawat	
His Highness in the Department of Siam	Uthen Bunyong	
Pha Kam	Somkiat Pattanasup	
	Samit Thanachot	
	Kaisri Kaewwimol	
Sri Mai	Pattaree Chanasak	
Jao Noi Sukhawong (chird)	Sasin Ngamjitsuksri	Pankorn Chantasorn
Princess Maenmeuang (chird)	Prangthip Yotngam	Chananya Lertwattanamongkol
Princess Mingla (chird)	Kulathida Manasirijinda	Naphak Janjitranon
Padmasutā, Queen of Burma (chird)	Kamolpan Thantawiriya	
Jao Nor Meuang (chird)		Chancamin Chayangkul
Jao Nang Maen Keaw (chird, The End)		Kulteera Yordchang
Jao Sai Rat (chird, The End)		Pongpitch Chaipitak

== Original soundtracks ==
=== 2000 ===
No.	Title	Lyrics	Music	Artist(s)	Length
1.	"Rak Nakara" (Thai: รากนครา)	Rayasuree Tonawanick	Chokdee Phakphoo	Watcharin Mayomthong	3:28
Total length:					00:00

=== 2017 ===
No.	Title	Lyrics	Music	Artist(s)	Length
1.	"Rak Nakara" (Thai: รากนครา)	Nongluk Anopat	Nongluk Anopat	Nongluk Anopat	4:44
2.	"Hua Jai Ror Kam Wa Rak" (Thai: หัวใจรอคำว่ารัก)	Narongvit Taechatanawat	Poramet Mueansanit	Napat Injaiuea	3:28
3.	Untitled (Thai: กล่อมเด็กเหนือ)	Orn-anong Panyawong		Natapohn Tameeruks	0:00
4.	"Hua Jai Ror Kam Wa Rak (Female Version)" (Thai: หัวใจรอคำว่ารัก (Female Version))	Narongvit Taechatanawat	Poramet Mueansanit	Mashima Meebamroong	3:30
Total length:					00:00

== Ratings ==
Red color — the number of the highest rating
Blue color — the number of the lowest rating
