= Kiattisak Udomnak =

Thai actor, singer, and comedian (born 1969)

- เกียรติศักดิ์ อุดมนาค
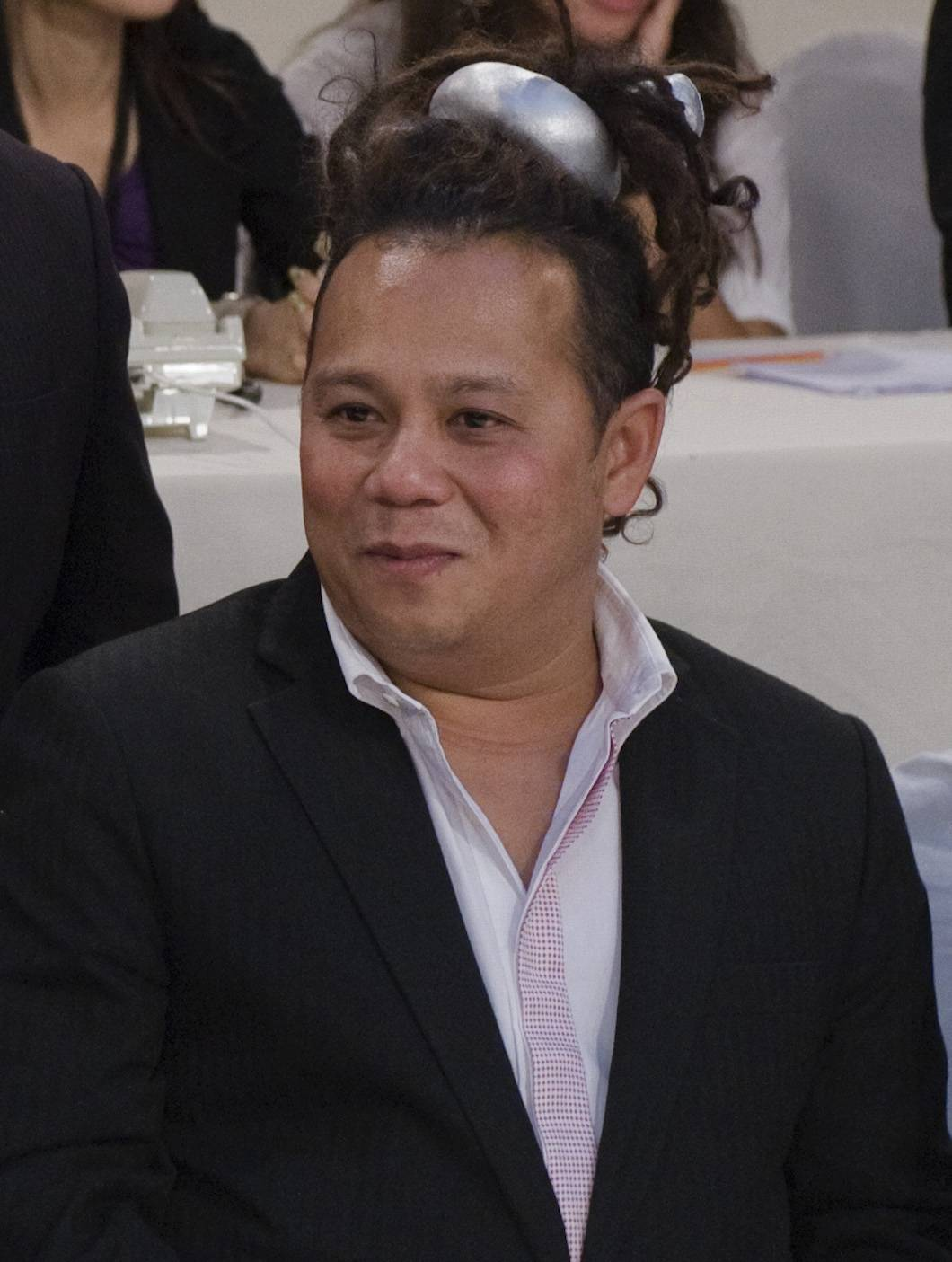
- Kiatisak at a charity phone-in (2010)
- Born: Kiattisak Udomnak; 22 September 1969 (age 57); Bangkok, Thailand
- Other names: Sena Hoi; Boy
- Education: Wat Suthiwararam School, Chulalongkorn University
- Occupations: Actor; comedian; singer; TV host and personality; YouTuber

Kiattisak Udomnak (Thai: เกียรติศักดิ์ อุดมนาค) is a Thai actor, singer, and comedian. He is best known in Thailand by his stage name Sena Hoi (Thai: เสนาหอย). He was born on September 22, 1969, in Bangkok Thailand nicknamed Boy. He has one older sister.

== Filmography ==
=== Director ===
| Year | Title | Type |
|---|---|---|
| 2007 | Saranae Love You | Film |

=== Television drama ===
| Year | Title | Role |
|---|---|---|
| 1992 | Kehard Dao | Chet |
| 1993 | Wai Nee Mai Mee Break | |
| 1994 | Wawun | Yoi |
| 1996 | Raboet Thoet Thoeng | Guest Role (Ep. 108) |
| 1997 | Ngoen Ngoen Ngoen | Dam |
| 1997 | Mai Yor Tor Morasum | |
| 2001 | Thewada Dern Din | Kamking |
| 2003 | 2 Poo Ying Yai | |
| 2014 | Prao | Frank |
| 2015 | Wonder Teacher | Teacher Asanee |
| 2016 | Thepthida Pa Khonkrit | Anucha |
| 2017 | Sarawat Mae Luk O | Sergeant Philai |
| 2018 | Bann Pun Dao | Kitty |
| 2020 | Lady Bancham | Toom |
| 2022 | My Queen | Toto |
| 2022 | Finding the Rainbow | Tui |
| 2023 | 7 Akkhani Phithak Chakkrawan | Kiattisak |

=== Film ===
| Year | Title | Role |
|---|---|---|
| 2007 | Ghost Station | Udd |
| 2008 | Super Hap | Teung |
| 2010 | Sam Ya | Hoy |
| 2010 | Saranae Siblor | Add |
| 2010 | BKO: Bangkok Knockout | Wanchai |
| 2010 | Saranae Hen Phi | Sergeant Paew |
| 2015 | Puen Keed Sentai | Sena Hoi |
| 2017 | Saranae Love You | Peng |
| 2022 | Fearless Love | President |
