= Chawinroj Likitcharoensakul =

Thai actor

- ชวินโรจน์ ลิขิตเจริญสกุล
- Chawinroj in 2018
- Born: Chawin Likitcharoenpong; 17 May 1998 (age 28); Bangkok, Thailand
- Other name: Fame
- Occupations: Actor; model
- Website: Official website

Chawinroj Likitcharoensakul (Thai: ชวินโรจน์ ลิขิตเจริญสกุล;name changed from Chawin Likitcharoenpong, nicknamed Fame) is a Thai actor. He was born 17 May 1998. He debuted at age 12 in the 2010 film The Little Comedian (บ้านฉัน..ตลกไว้ก่อน (พ่อสอนไว้)). He studies at Mattayom6, Srinakharinwirot University Prasarnmit Demonstration School.

== Filmography ==
=== Movie ===
| Year | Movie | Role |
|---|---|---|
| 2010 | The Little Comedian | Lortok |
| 2012 | Seven Something | Boy |

=== TV drama ===
| Year | Movie | Role |
|---|---|---|
| 2012 | Look Pee Look Nong | JJ. |
| 2015 | Wonder Teacher | Pat |
| 2015 | Nat and Nat | Jo |
| 2015 | Lea Ratee | Peat/Peerachat |

== Recognition ==
- Nominated for Top Awards 2010
- Nominated for Kom Chat Luek Award 8
