= Z.Tao discography =

Huang Zitao discography
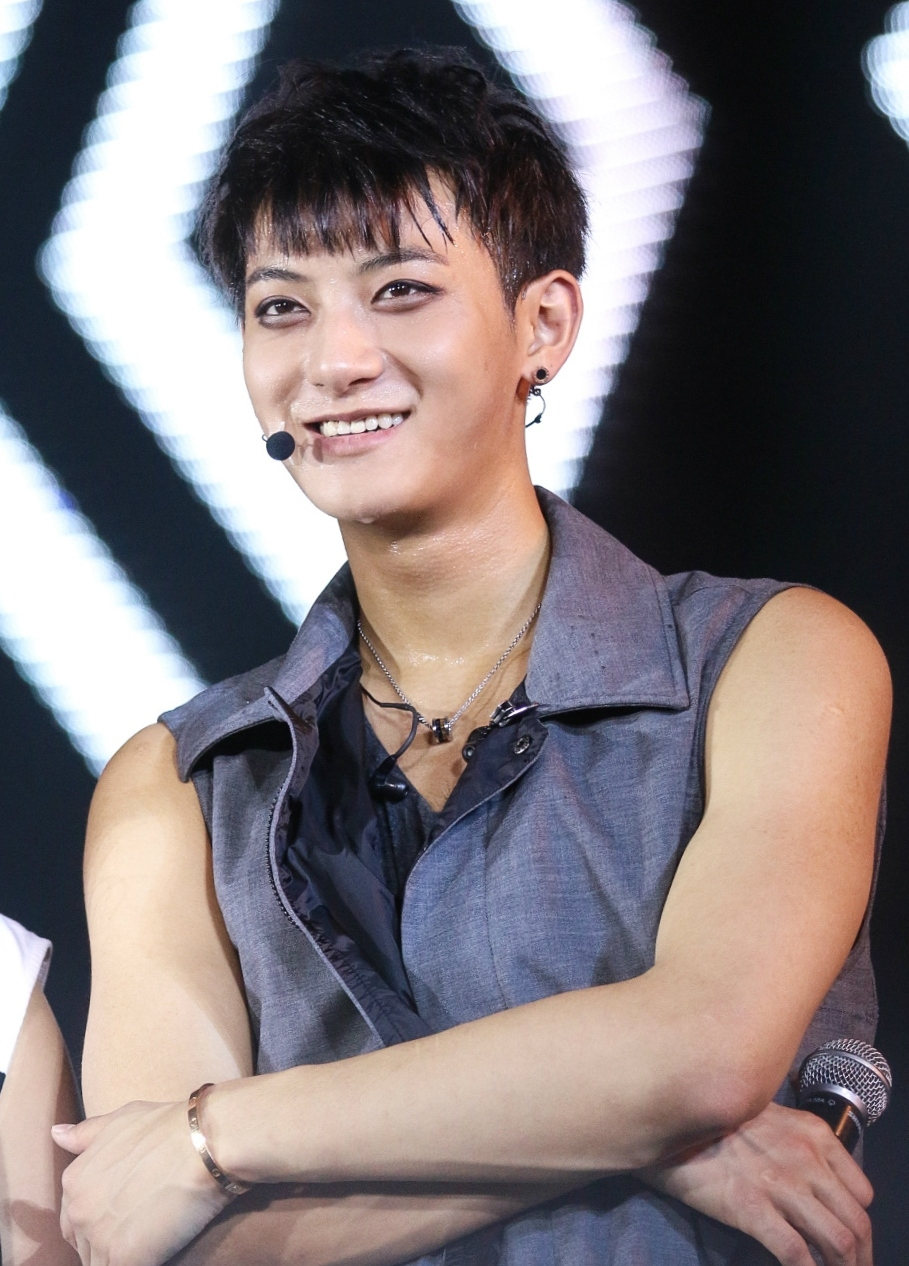
- Huang in 2015
- Studio albums: 1
- EPs: 4
- Singles: 24
- Single albums: 1

Chinese rapper and singer Huang Zitao has released multiple records under the stage name Z.Tao.

== Albums ==
=== Studio albums ===
Title	Details	Peak chart positions	Sales
Title	Details	CHN V	Sales
The Road	Released: August 22, 2016; Label: Huang Zitao Studio; Format: 2CD+DVD, digital download; Track listing: 1. The Road; 2. Hello, Hello (feat. Wiz Khalifa); 3. Black White (AB); 4. Underground King; 5. Adore; 6. (十九歲) (19); 7. Mystery Girl; 8. New Day; 9. T.A.O; 10. (皇冠) (Imperial Crown); 11. One Heart; 12. (舍不得) (Reluctantly); 13. Cinderella Girl; 14. (我是大主宰) (I'm the Sovereign); 15. Feel Awake; 16. M.O.M; 17. Alone; 18. Yesterday	1	CHN: 6,888
Sleepless	Released: August 22, 2022; Label: Beijing Longtao Entertainment Culture; Format: Digital download; Track listing: 1. (失眠) (Sleepless); 2. (十二月的聖誕節) (Sweet Christmas) (with Xu Yiyang & Vanessa); 3. (朋友圈) (Moments); 4. (冰激淋) (Ice Cream); 5. (黑卡) (BLACKCARD) (with Gai); 6. (抨擊) (ATTACK); 7. (最開心的瞬間) (The Moment); 8. (心願) (Wish)	—N/a	

=== Live albums ===
Title	Details
Huang Zitao's 2016 Nanjing Concert LIVE (黄子韬2016南京站演唱会LIVE)	Released: October 9, 2016; Label: Extraordinary Results Culture Media; Format: Digital download; Track listing: 1. NEW DAY (Live); 2. One Heart (Live); 3. 舍不得 (Reluctantly) (Live); 4. Hello,Hello (Live); 5. MVAdore (Live); 6. Alone (Live); 7. Underground King (Live); 8. Mystery Girl (Live); 9. Feel Awake (Live); 10. Yesterday (Live)

== Extended plays ==
Title	Details	Sales
TAO	Released: July 23, 2015; Label: Huang Zitao Studio; Format: Digital download	CHN: 747,206
Z.TAO	Released: August 19, 2015; Label: Huang Zitao Studio; Format: Digital download	
Art is Blue	Released: May 20, 2019, and May 29, 2019; Label: Beijing Longtao Entertainment Culture Co., Ltd.; Format: Digital download	
Music is BLUE	Released: June 12, 2019; Label: Beijing Longtao Entertainment Culture Co., Ltd.; Format: Digital download	
Don't Leave Me (爸妈可以不走吗)	Released: December 24, 2020; Label: Beijing Longtao Entertainment Culture Co., Ltd.; Format: Digital download	
She and You (她与你)	Released: February 26, 2021; Label: Huang Zitao Studio; Format: Digital download	

=== Single albums ===
Title	Details	Peak chart positions	Sales
Title	Details	CHN V	Sales
Adore	Released: June 5, 2016; Label: Huang Zitao Studio; Track listing: 1. Adore	1	CHN: 36,310
"30's Club" pt.1	Released: June 5, 2023; Label: Huang Zitao Studio; Track listing: 1. SINK (沉沦); 2. PARADISE (白马) (featuring KnowKnow); 3. NOBODY	—N/a	
"30's Club" pt.2	Released: April 12, 2024; Label: Huang Zitao Studio; Track listing: 1. LIGHTS (featuring Lu Han); 2. PRETEND (假裝) (featuring YungK2); 3. I DONT EVEN	—N/a	

== Singles ==
=== As lead artist ===
Title	Year	Peak chart positions			Album
Title	Year	CHN TME UNI	CHN V	CHN Top	Album
"T.A.O"	2015	—N/a	—N/a	—N/a	TAO
"Yesterday"	2015	—N/a	—N/a	—N/a	TAO
"Crown" (皇冠)	2015	—N/a	—N/a	—N/a	Z.TAO
"M.O.M"	2015	—N/a	—N/a	—N/a	Non-album singles
"Reluctantly" (舍不得)	2015	—N/a	—N/a	—N/a	Non-album singles
"Intro (Vox Up)"	2015	—N/a	—N/a	—N/a	Non-album singles
"The Road"	2016	—N/a	2	—N/a	The Road
"Underground King"	2016	—N/a	—	—N/a	The Road
"Hello Hello" (featuring Wiz Khalifa)	2016	—N/a	2	—N/a	The Road
"Black White (AB)"	2016	—N/a	2	—N/a	The Road
"New Day"	2017	—N/a	—	—	The Road
"Promise"	2017	—N/a	10	2	Non-album singles
"Collateral Love"	2017	—N/a	—	2	Non-album singles
"Uncover" (揭穿)	2017	—N/a	—	2	Non-album singles
"Still in Time" (Note: "Still in Time Remixes" was released in October 2, 2017, with 3 tracks: "Tiësto Remix", "Tiësto's Extended Big Room Mix" & "Tiësto's Big Room Mix".) (还来得及)	2017	—N/a	13	1	Non-album singles
"Beggar"	2018	—N/a	14	1	Non-album singles
"Hater"	2018	—N/a	—	1	Non-album singles
"Beggar (Daryl K Remix)" (Note: Used as the theme song for EDC China 2018.)	2018	—N/a	—	1	Non-album singles
"Misunderstand"(误会)	2018	—N/a	—	1	Non-album singles
"Silently" (Note: Used as the theme song for 神武3 (ShenWu3 Online Game)) (默默)	2018	—N/a	—	3	Non-album singles
"Stay Open" (with Diplo & MØ)	2018	—N/a	4	3	Non-album singles
"KOC"	2018	29	—	4	Non-album singles
"Break Up" (分手不分離)	2018	16	—	1	Non-album singles
"NPNG" (不劳不获) (featuring GAI)	2019	8	—N/a	3	Art is Blue
"One" (你也会像我一样)	2019	5	—N/a	1	Art is Blue
"Fault" (错)	2019	8	—N/a	10	Music is Blue
"AI" (Note: "AI" (哎), a derived song from the single "AI" was released on December 31, 2019, as the first joint performance by Huang Zitao and his official two-dimensional character Taosman.)	2019	50	—N/a	1	Music is Blue
"The Best of Us" (最好的我们)	2019	25	—N/a	11	Non-album single
"Ice Cream" (冰激凌)	2020	8	—N/a	—N/a	Sleepless
"Moment" (Note: Promotional Song for QQ Speed) (最开心的瞬间)	2020	21	—N/a	—N/a	Sleepless
"Attack" (抨击)	2020	24	—N/a	—N/a	Sleepless
"Black Card" (黑卡) (featuring GAI)	2020	24	—N/a	—N/a	Sleepless
"You" (Note: Cover Version of Forward Forever OST) (你)	2020	—	—N/a	—N/a	Non-album single
"Moments" (朋友圈)	2020	11	—N/a	—N/a	Sleepless
"Don't Leave Me" (爸妈可以不走吗)	2020	42	—N/a	—N/a	Don't Leave Me
"MAOTAI" (茅TAI) (with BRIDGE)	2020	97	—N/a	—N/a	Don't Leave Me
"Sweet Christmas" (Note: LT Family Special Song) (十二月的圣诞节) (with Xu Yiyang & Vanessa)	2020	69	—N/a	—N/a	Sleepless
"Sleepless" (失眠)	2020	33	—N/a	—N/a	Sleepless
"W.T.F (Way Too Fast)" (with Victor Ma & YOUNG13DBABY)	2021	—	—N/a	—N/a	Non-album single
"She & You" (她与你)	2021	33	—N/a	—N/a	She & You
"Ending" (后果)	2021	58	—N/a	—N/a	She & You
"Cross The Line" (越界)	2021	29	—N/a	—N/a	Non-album singles
"Let Go" (我放弃) (featuring YungK2)	2021	—	—N/a	—N/a	Non-album singles
"CEO" (中国CEO)	2021	—	—N/a	—N/a	Non-album singles
"The Rest of My Life Is Yours" (Note: 10th Anniversary Debut Commemorative Song) (余生都是你)	2021	38	—N/a	—N/a	Non-album singles
"Departure" (Note: Theme song for 2022 Winter Olympics) (啟程)	2021	—	—N/a	—N/a	Non-album singles
"Open This Sky" (Note: League of Legends Mobile Games Pro Qualification Promotional Song) (划破天际)	2022	—	—N/a	—N/a	Non-album singles
"Young King Young Boss" (Note: "Young King Young Boss" was released in 3 versions: with Doggie, YungK2 & Zhong Junyi, solo & featuring KnowKnow.)	2022	—	—N/a	—N/a	Non-album singles
"Rainbow" (我忘记多长一段时间没有看到彩虹) (featuring Doggie)	2022	—	—N/a	—N/a	Non-album singles
"Yellow"	2022	—	—N/a	—N/a	Non-album singles
"Love Lost" (白色情人)	2023	91	—N/a	—N/a	Non-album singles
"Mask" (面具) (featuring KnowKnow)	2023	—	—N/a	—N/a	Non-album singles

=== As featured artist ===
Title	Year	Album
"Sensitive" (敏感) (Lu Han featuring Z.Tao)	2020	Non-album single
"Like a Child" (像孩子一样长大) (Sunnee featuring Z.Tao)	2020	How's the weather today? (天氣：晴)

=== Soundtrack appearances ===
Title	Year	Peak chart positions		Album
Title	Year	CHN V	CHN Top	Album
"The First Lesson" (第一课)	2015	—	—	First Lesson of School OST
"I'm the Sovereign" (我是大主宰)	2015	1	—	I'm the Sovereign OST
"19" (十九岁)"	2016	3	—	Edge of Innocence OST
"You" (想成为你)	2017	13	1	The Foreigner OST
"Single" (单身)	2019	—	2	Forward Forever OST
"Once Beautiful" (好不好)	2019	10	2	The Brightest Star in the Sky OST
"A Teenager In The Wind (带风的少年)" (featuring Liu Yuning)	2019	—	4	Hot-Blooded Youth OST
"Wish (心願)"	2020	—N/a	—N/a	The Protectors OST
"Always be with you (四季三餐)"	2021	—N/a	—N/a	Daily Fantasy OST
"Dawn Breaks (黎明破晓)"	2021	—N/a	—N/a	Revelation OST
"Be My Only One (做我的唯一)"	2023	—N/a	—N/a	New Vanity Fair OST

== Guest appearances ==
List of non-single guest appearances with other performing artists
Title	Year	Other artist(s)	Album	Ref.
"Love Tonight"	2014	Zhou Mi	Rewind	
"Rewind (Chinese Version)"	2014	Zhou Mi	Rewind	
"Time" (Tiësto's Big Room Mix)	2017	Tiësto	Club Life, Vol. 5 - China	
"Attack (Live)" (抨击 (Live))	2020	—N/a	New Generation of Rap (3rd Live)	
"Ending - Live" (后果 - Live)	2021	—N/a	Sisters Who Make Waves 2 - 12th Live	
"Moments - Live" (朋友圈 - Live)	2021	—N/a	Sisters Who Make Waves 2 - 12th Live	
"Bad Coffee" (坏咖啡)	2022	Vanessa	Secret Garden	

== Music videos ==
Title	Year	Director	Ref.
As lead artist
"T.A.O"	2015	Colin Tilley	
"Crown" (皇冠)	2015	Nick Lentz	
"Reluctantly" (捨不得)	2015	Nick Asgill	
"I'm the Sovereign" (我是大主宰)	2015	Kuang Sheng	
"The Road"	2016	Nick Lentz	
"Hello Hello" (Z.Tao feat. Wiz Khalifa)	2016	Ethan Lader	
"19" (十九岁)	2016	—N/a	
"Black White (AB)"	2016	Darren Craig	
"You" (想成为你)	2017	—N/a	
"Beggar"	2018	Tyler Rumph	
"Stay Open (Chinese ver.)" (Z.Tao, Diplo & MØ)	2018	TIGER CAVE Studio	
"AI"	2019	Ziyong Kim	
"Moments" (朋友圈)	2020	—N/a	
"Hao Bu Hao" (好不好)	2020	—N/a	
As featured artist
"Rewind (Chinese Ver.)" (挽回) (Zhou Mi feat Tao of EXO)	2014	—N/a	
Only as actor
"Agape" (愛的獨白) (Zhang Liyin)	2014	—N/a	
"Not Alone" (我一個人) (Zhang Liyin)	2014	—N/a	
"Do You Know" (你知道嗎) (Wendy)	2014	TIGER CAVE Studio	
