= Liu Yuxin (singer) =

Chinese singer, rapper and dancer (born 1997)

Liu Yuxin/Xin Liu
- 刘雨昕
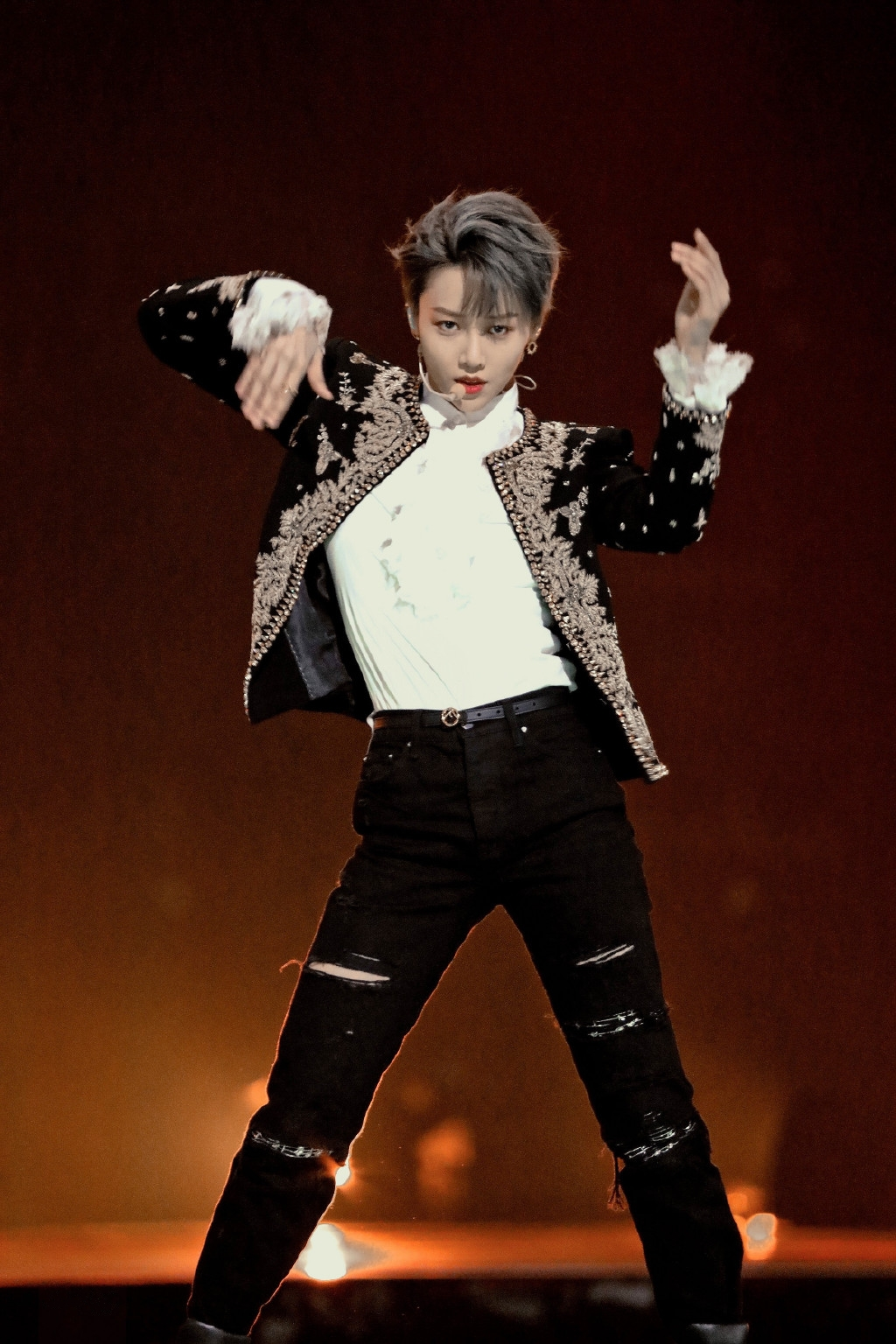
- Xin in 2021
- Born: Liu Yuxin; April 20, 1997 (age 29); Guizhou, China
- Other names: Xin; Xin Liu
- Education: Tianjin University of Sport
- Occupations: Singer; rapper; producer; dancer; songwriter; composer; model
- Musical career
- Genres: C-pop; hip hop; dance
- Instruments: Vocals; piano; guitar; drums; talkbox
- Years active: 2012–present
- Labels: AMG Asia Music Group; Idol Youth (Note: As a member of The9 only.); iQIYI

Chinese name
- Traditional Chinese: 劉雨昕
- Simplified Chinese: 刘雨昕
Transcriptions
Standard Mandarin
- Hanyu Pinyin: Liú Yǔxīn

Liu Yuxin (Chinese: 刘雨昕; Korean: 류위신; born April 20, 1997), known in English as Xin Liu, is a Chinese singer, dancer and producer born in Guizhou Province, Southwestern China. She rose to fame as the top contestant of IQIYI's survival reality program Youth With You 2, finishing first and becoming the center of the girl group The9.^{[1]} In late 2021, Xin began her solo career. Her album Epsilon and Xanadu tops Chinese billboards. Xin is also the very first female captain of Street Dance of China (season 5). Xin joined 88rising and made her US debut at Coachella in April 2024.

Xin first gained recognition as a contestant on Chinese television talent show Up Young! (向上吧！少年) in 2012. In 2016, she competed in the girl-group survival reality program Lady Bees (蜜蜂少女队), debuting as a member of the resulting girl-group, LadyBees. In 2020, Xin finished first on iQiyi survival reality program Youth With You 2, leading to her debut as a member and the centre of The9.

As a dancer, Xin started learning street dance when she was ten years old and focused on popping dance techniques. She has performed a variety of dance styles ranging from street dance styles to modern dance styles, including popping, locking, krump, urban, hip-hop, jazz, house, waacking, contemporary, swag in different dance competitions and shows.

As a singer, she released her 3-track EP Epsilon in 2021, which tops the best selling records in China and worldwide. Since December 2021, she started releasing her first full-length album Xanadu that includes 10 songs with 10 MV of 10+ different dancing styles. Some of her representative works include "Baby I Know", "Boom Tick Boom", "Hurricane", "Look Into The Mirror", "Like Love", and "Beatholic".

Xin's fandom name is "Um", which stands for umbrella; her fandom colour is "Xin Blue".

== Early life ==
Xin was born on April 20, 1997, in Guizhou, China. Her mother was a national level-local opera actor specialized in Kunqu. Her father worked in the Chinese classical music industry. Her grandfather worked in a Peking Opera group prior to retirement. Since her childhood, Liu had been traveling with her mother to different performances. She had learned ballet dance for a short period and passed Grade 8 of the Piano Grade Examination in China.

Xin started learning street dance when she was 10 years old, and she went to Beijing by herself to further her training in street dance when she turned 12. She finished her secondary education at the Beijing Contemporary Music School, majoring in Contemporary Music and Contemporary Dance. In 2010, she became the only disciple of James Lin, a well-known street dancer in China.

In 2014, Xin was accepted to the Tianjin University of Sport, majoring in Music Recording in the College of Art & Culture. Xin graduated with her bachelor's degree in June 2018. At the college graduation ceremony, she was a student speaker for the graduating class. She received the "Gold Harvest Award for the Most Influential Graduate of Class of 2018" and presented "The Most Innovative President" award to the university president as a student representative.

== Career ==
=== Early career ===
In 2012, Xin participated in Hunan TV's youth empowerment variety show Up Young! (向上吧！少年), winning the title of "Most Positive Youth Award".

In 2013, Xin participated in Dragon TV (SDTV)'s dance competition variety show So You Think You Can Dance (舞林争霸) and won the pass tickets from all four mentors including Yang Liping, Jordan Chan, Jin Xing and Fang Jun. In the same year, she was the winner of Sexy Dancer Popping competition in Guiyang, Guizhou, the winner of Top Battle in Beijing Contemporary Music Academy competition, as well as the runner-up in China Popping Session.

In 2014, Xin won the runner-up in Dance in Qian City and released her very first original song "Never" (从不).

In 2015, Xin released another original piece "18" and won the first place in the contemporary dance division of the 5th Annual Panlong Cup dance competition in the College of Art & Culture of Tianjin University of Sport.

=== 2016–2019: LadyBees ===
In March 2016, Xin participated in Zhejiang TV's Chinese girl group survival reality program Lady Bees (蜜蜂少女队). Prior to recording, she was a trainee for a 3-month closed-door training hosted by Xunfeng Culture. During the competition, was mentored by Nicky Wu as a member of "Shining Dragon Ball" throughout the show. On May 28, 2016, She made her debut as the center of LadyBees.

On April 26, 2017, Xin released a single "Only Have Music Left" (穷得只剩音乐) with Evey Zhang and Teresa Tseng, a promotional song in movie Hot Rival (热血情敌). On June 24, she participated in iQiyi's rap competition The Rap of China Season 1 (中国有嘻哈第一季) and passed audience approved by mentor Kris Wu. However, due to conflict of schedule, she stepped down from the competition after advancement.

On February 25, 2018, the network movie Lady Bees starring Liu was released on iQiyi. On March 17, 2018, Xin participated in iQiyi's dance reality show Hot Blood Dance Crew (热血街舞团). On March 23, Xin released her first solo EDM song "Feel Good". On May 20, Liu released her first EP entitled Xin, including "Hot Party", "Feel Good", "It's You" (就是你), and "Don't Want to Miss You" (不要想念你). Liu also participated in the preparation and post-production process of this album. In August 2018, she made a guest appearance in the movie iPartment 5 (爱情公寓5). In November 2018, LadyBees released the single and mini-album entitled Queen Bee, in which Xin starred in minifilm "Girl Power Age".

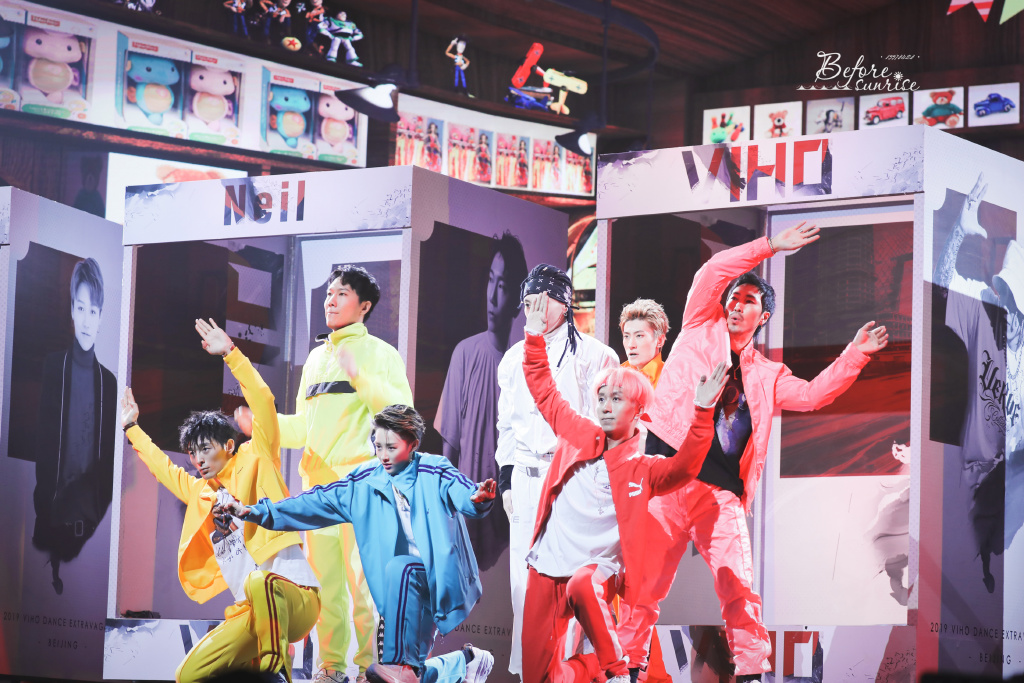
Xin (in blue) performing at Viho Yang's Verve Street Dance Show

On May 18, 2019, Xin participated in Youku's street dance competition Street Dance of China Season II (这！就是街舞第二季). She successfully advanced from Vanness Wu's audition with her popping performance but was eliminated at the seven to smoke battle in the fifth episode as the 49th place of the season. On August 3, she was a special guest in the VERVE Street Dance Show hosted by professional street dancer Viho Yang.

Due to different personal and professional plans, LadyBees was disbanded later in 2019.

=== 2020–2021: Youth With You 2, The9 ===
In 2020, Xin participated in iQiyi's reality survival show Youth with You Season 2. She performed her original song "My Opening Speech" (我的开场白) as a self-introduction on February 22, 2020.

On March 22, 2020, Xin performed "No Joke" (adapted from Show Lo's song) in her Preliminary Ranking stage, and was ranked as A-class. On March 26, 2020, Xin performed "The Eve" from Exo. She was voted as the first place of the group with 184 votes, and the group was ranked third place among all dance groups. On April 5, Xin was voted as the center of the theme song "Yes! OK!" with 26 votes from fellow trainees. On April 18, Xin performed "Miss You 3000" (想见你想见你想见你) from the band 831 during the second public performance and won the 1st place wweepstake (MVP) with 291 votes. The group was ranked as the first place among all performances. The original singer 831 publicly invited Xin to perform together through Weibo. On May 7, Xin performed "Lion" during the third public performance and won the 1st place sweepstake (MVP) with 183 votes. The group was ranked as the first place among all performances. On May 30, Xin performed "Yes! OK!", "A Little Bit", and "Promise" with the top 20 trainees on the finale night. Xin finished first in the competition with 17,359,242 votes and debuted as the center of the project girl group The9. Xin was also awarded the title International Most Popular Trainee at the finale.

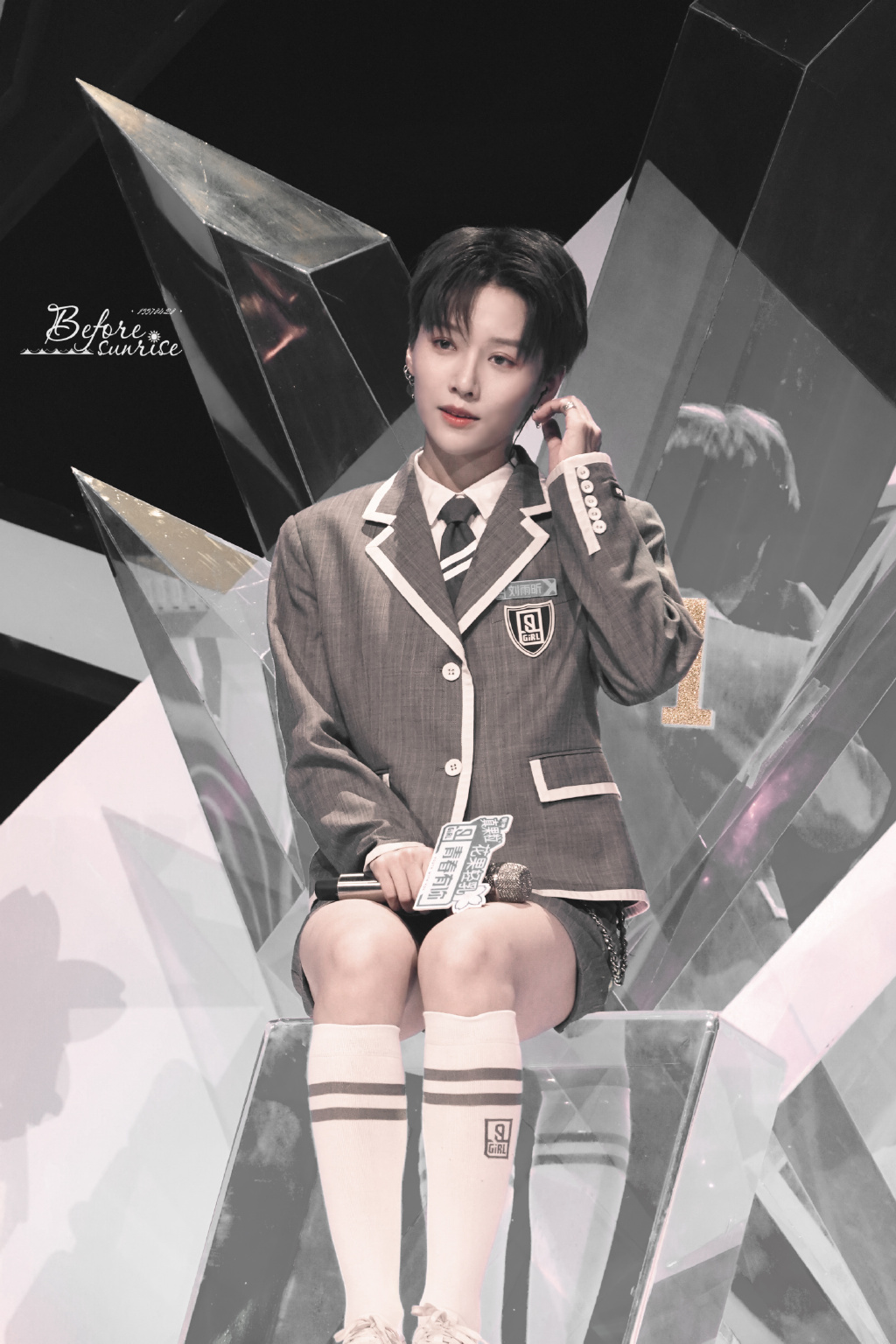
Xin winning first place at the Youth With You Season 2 Championship Night

Performance	Song	Other Performers	Ranking	Reference
Preliminary Ranking	No Joke	N/A	Class A	
1st Public Performance	The Eve	Kiki Xu, K Lu, Three, Aurora, Ruohang Feng, Jenny Zeng	1st Place in the Group	
2nd Public Performance	Miss You 3000	DDD, Xiaowei Duan, NaHo, Monster Sun	Team Winner & 1st Place Sweepstake (MVP)	
2nd Performance Studio Version	Ambush On All Sides II	Babymonster An, Jessie Fu, Snow Kong, Victoria Li	N/A	
3rd Public Performance	Lion	Babymonster An, Jue Chen, Diamond, Frhanm Shangguan, Yan Yu, Sharon Wang	1st Place Sweepstake (MVP)	
QQ Music Bonus Performance	Reverse	Babymonster An, Jue Chen, Diamond, Frhanm Shangguan, Yan Yu, Sharon Wang	N/A	
Cooperation Stage	I'm Not Yours	Lisa, Aria Jin, K Lu, Snow Kong, Esther Yu, Jenny Zeng	N/A	
Final Performance	A Little Bit	Diamond, Snow Kong, NineOne, Frhanm Shangguan, Xinran Song, Sharon Wang, Shaking, Yan Yu, Jenny Zeng	N/A	
Final Performance	Promise	Top 20 of Youth with You II		

On June 1, 2020, Xin released the single "Beatholic", a song she assisted with writing and producing. This is her first individual music production after debuting as the center of The9. "Beatholic" was prepared in 2019 prior to Xin's audition for Youth with You 2. Japanese music producer Hiroshi Kawaguchi and photographer Mika Ninagawa were invited and assisted with the music and MV production in Japan. On June 5, 2020, "Beatholic" MV was released, featuring Japanese top street dance group KING OF SWAG.

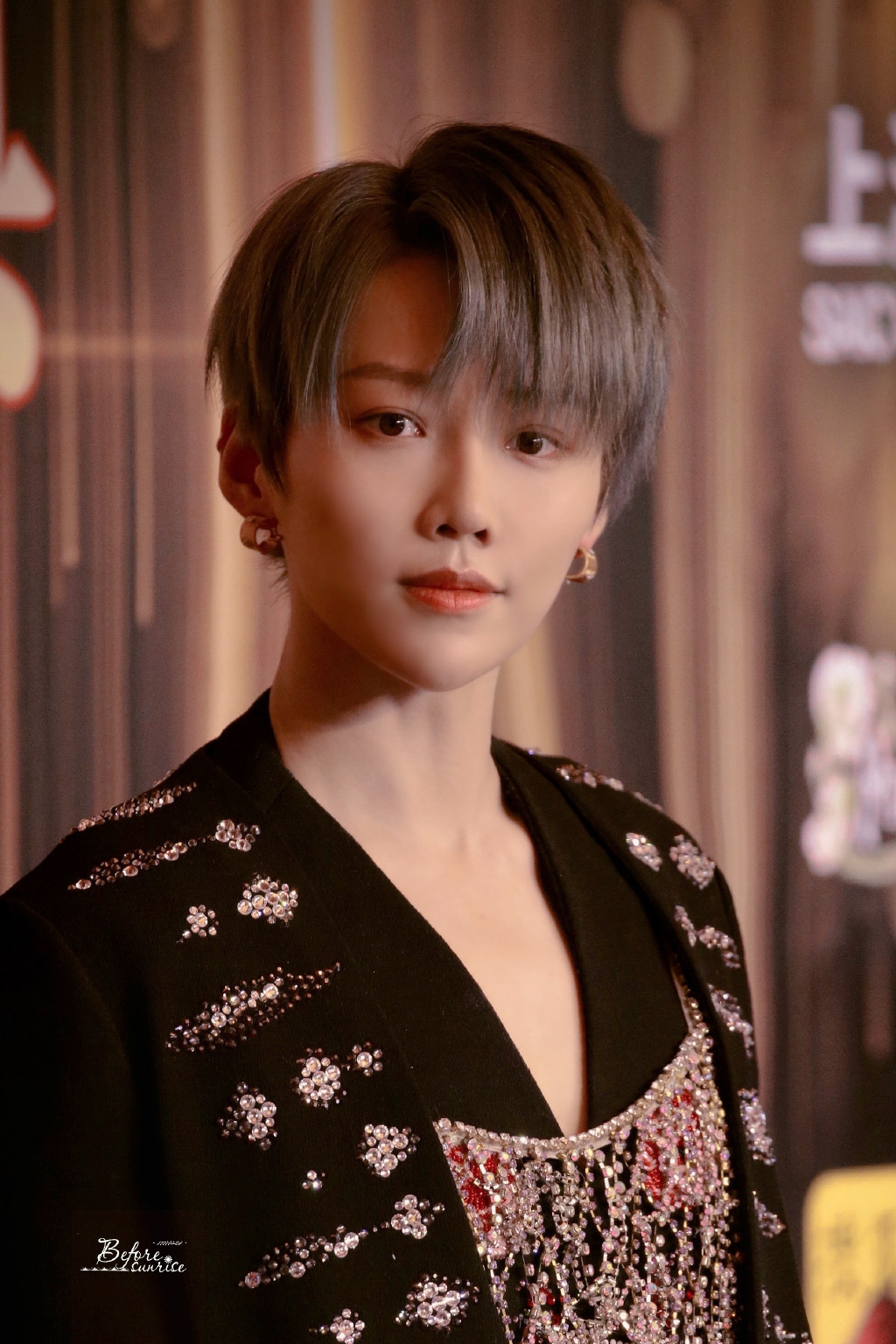
Xin Liu attending the annual Sohu Fashion Award in December 2020

On August 10, 2020, The9 released their first EP "Sphinx X".

On September 11, 2020, Xin attended and performed at the Make Up For Ever new product release event as its brand ambassador. On September 20, Xin attended the Christian Dior fashion event, Designer of Dreams, performing "Hot party" and "Don't Want to Miss You" (不要想念你) at its private live concert.

On October 3, 2020, Xin performed <This is X> as a special guest at the season finale of Street Dance of China Season III (这！就是街舞第三季). In the same month, she participated in a podcast documentary, The Nth Years of Intangible Cultural Heritage (非遗第N年), organized by China Central Radio and TV station. As a storyteller, Xin narrated intangible cultural heritage elements from Guizhou province of China. From September 13 to October 26, Xin competed at the JiangsuTV's Masked Dancing King (蒙面舞王). She was crowned as the Challenger of the second round. On the season's finale, Xin battled in 8v8 routine dance, "Sanchakou" duet dance (a dance incorporating both Peking Opera and popping elements), and an urban dance "Try". Xin won the Best Battle award of the season.

In December 2020, Xin's fashion reality show Fourtry 2 (潮流合伙人2) was aired. On December 19, she attended the annual Sohu Fashion Award and received the "Most Popular Celebrity" award. On December 25, The9 released its first album "MatriX" (虚实X境), featuring Xin's original song "Biu Biu". On the same day, Xin was selected "Top Ten People of the Year" by Southern Metropolis Entertainment (南都娱乐). On December 28, Xin was selected as "Most Popular Female Celebrity" by iFeng (凤凰网). On December 31, she delivered her first "BiuBiu" performance on JiangsuTV 2021 New Year's Eve Concert.

On January 5, 2021, Xin was featured on iFeng Entertainment's End of the Year Special Campaign We Still Have Faith – Role Model of the Year (我们还有信仰 – 年度榜样). She was recognized for her tagline "I don't forbid any tags" (我不忌讳任何标签).

On February 9, 2021, Xin performed at the ShandongTV Spring Festival Gala with her solo "Hot Party" and "BiuBiu". On February 10, Xin was a special guest for Liu Qian's magic show on ZhejiangTV Spring Festival Comedy Gala with her teammates. On February 11, Xin performed "Youth on the Run" (奔跑的青春) at CCTV New Year's Gala. On the same day, Kuaishou 2021 Orange vs White Talent Show was aired; Xin performed "Miss You 3000" (想见你想见你想见你) and "BiuBiu". On February 12, Xin collaborated with singer Mao Amin on HunanTV Global Overseas Chinese Spring Festival, performing "BiuBiu" and "Smiling at the Sight of You" (一见你就笑).

On March 26 and 27 2021, The9 hosted their first online concert X-CITY (虚实之城), an online live-stream concert utilizing extended reality technology (a combination of virtual, augmented and mixed reality).

On April 20, 2021, Xin released her 3-track EP "Epsilon", including songs "Of Course", "Practice", and "U and I". It tops the best selling albums in China and worldwide. On December 5, 2021, The9 officially disbanded and Xin began her solo career.

On December 15, 2021, Xin released the MV of "Baby I know", which is the first track of her very first full-length album "Xanadu".

=== 2022–present: solo career beginning, Xanadu ===
Over the course of December 2021 – September 2022, Xin has released 9 songs of "Xanadu". "Xanadu" includes 10 songs and 10 music videos in total, performed in 10+ distinct dancing styles. Xin experimented traditional Chinese folk music with modern pop in this album. From her interview with Global People and Harpers Bazaar-Vietnam Magazine, this has been a deep interest of her since she grew up in one of the most ethnically diverse region of China. The 9 songs that have been released are "Baby I Know", "Black Sun and White Moon", "Hurricane", "New and More", "X-plan", "Look Into The Mirror", "Like Love", "I and I", and "Boom Tick Boom". The last song has remained a secret track, which will soon be released. Xin collaborated with producers such as Tiger JK, Jeremy Ji, Arai Soichiro to produce the album, where she co-produced and solo-produced a couple of the songs. Her involvement of the album goes beyond as she authored majority of the songs' lyrics. In terms of dance MV, international dancers, including Acky (popping), Melvin Timtim (Hiphop), Tight Eyez (Krump), Aya Sato (Voguing), Lyle Beniga, Lachica, Galen Hooks, 1Million – Jinwoo & Youngbeen, and Kiel Tutin, led the choreography of each songs.

On July 18, 2022, SM released "Better" (Chinese version), where Xin collaborated with BoA, planned and produced by executive producer Lee Sooman. "Better" tops the Chinese music and MV charts, and has accumulated over millions of view on YouTube, Weibo, and Bilibili.

On August 13, 2022, Xin joined Street Dance of China Season 5 as its very first female captain. Her opening performance showcased her popping skill and New jack swing, a new element for her to incorporate. During an overlapping period of time, Xin also joined E-Pop of China as one of the lead artists to feat various electronic music producers, where she showcased a variety of skills beyond vocals in her performances., including Talkbox, B-box, and Djembe.

In April 2024, XIN joined 88rising and made her US debut at Coachella.

=== Public image and reception ===
==== Lady Bees era ====
In a report published by 163.com, Xin was described as "not only possesses a cool look, she also has incredible talent in singing and dancing." Nicky Wu, Xin's former mentor during the Lady Bees competition, described Xin's performance as "having a unique style when she sings and dances." When commenting on Xin's stage presence, judge Hong Su stated that "Xin stands out during the competition of Lady Bees", evaluating her performances as having "a good control of pace and entertainment".

After debuting as a member of LadyBees, China News commented that "Xin and the rest of Lady Bees are extremely energetic both in front of the camera and in real life. They have great synergy in their music and dance."

==== EP Xin era ====
After the release of Liu's EP Xin, famous producer Bingchun Lin commented that Xin possesses the basic quality of being an outstanding artist, which included "professional performances, diligent attitude, positive ambition, and a calm lifestyle". According to Lin, Xin "never fears to pursue new things, challenging her limits nonstop". In their interactions, Xin focuses on "enriching her inner self, keeping up her passion for learning, and showing humbleness and politeness".

==== Youth With You 2/The9 era ====
After Xin became the winner of Youth With You 2, South China Morning Post commended Xin's win as a demonstration of "being yourself and not another cute clone off a production line". The newspaper highlighted Xin's embodiment of non-conforming beauty standards in an interview with Wu Han, a producer of Youth With You 2. Xin was described as an ideal contestant for the show because she "excelled in multiple areas" and she aligned well with the show's goal of "encouraging diversity". In July 2020, Xin Liu's name was referenced as a positive androgynous role model in a viral social experiment video on anti-bullying. In a video entitled "Butch Girl Is Bullied by Classmates", a bystander intervened the mistreatment of a female student by using Xin Liu's popularity and victory as an example of acceptance, urging the bully party to stop their behaviors.

In an editorial article by RAIIChina, Xin was described to have "Challenged Gender Norms in Mandopop". Her popularity was included as one of the "most significant cultural events and voices in 2020 which spotlighted women's issues in China in a positive push for change".

On Xin's birthday, April 20, 2020, she released her comeback EP Epsilon which recorded a massive 24hrs sales of 42 million Chinese yuan and currently boasts of 47 million yuan sales. The EP was highly praised by professionals for its richness in music styles, lyrics, composition and production.

On December 5, 2021, The9 came out with their final EP The Nine which also marked the dissolution of the group as their 1 1/2 years came to an end.

== Philanthropy ==
On September 5, 2016, Xin participated in "Music Radio 'I Want To Go To School' 1200 Education Aid in Action" charity event and fundraiser to support left-behind children in need. On September 6, 2016, she attended the "Lu Chen Foundation – Music Loves to Smile, Hand in Hand for Reunion" charity event. On October 29, 2016, Xin performed in a roadshow organized by "Music Radio 'I Want To Go To School' 1200 Education Aid in Action" in Shanghai and sold autographed souvenirs during charity sales.

In September 2017, Xin served as the Charity Ambassador for the "Face Fashion Association Charity Event" and visited children with autism spectrum disorder in Shanghai Pudong Special Education School.

In September 2018, Xin participated in the "Music Loves to Smile in School" charity event organized by Shanghai Hai Kang Bei Foundation to support children with autism spectrum disorder.

In September 2018, Xin participated in the "Daliang Mountain Charity Event" organized by Face Charity Foundation and Cedar Charity.

On January 31, 2019, Xin participated in the "Charity Sale Celebrity Referrer" hosted by Xiantou Commonweal, selling personal items and donating all proceeds to designated charity project "Education Aid for Tibet", and contributing to the construction of the Hope Primary School located in Tibet, China.

On May 25, 2020, Xin donated 10,000 CNY to the Aixiaoya Foundation Project of China Social Welfare Foundation, contributing to the promotion of feminine care and reproductive health education for girls in rural areas.

On September 9, 2020, Xin served as the Goodwill Ambassador of Renren Charity and participated in the "Good School" project organized by China Foundation for Poverty Alleviation.

On January 18, 2021, Xin was invited by Southern Weekly and participated in the creation of the Beijing Contemporary Art Foundation (BCAF). The purpose of this foundation was to discover innovative culture and to motivate artistic philanthropic arts. Through "Renewal of Spring" (万象回春) new year stationary boxes, proceeds from this sale contributed to the development of BCAF Emerging Cultural Journalism Scholarships for young talents, further supporting the development of culture and arts.

On 21 July 2021, Xin donated 1,000,000 CNY to the Red Cross Society in Zhengzhou. The donation will be channeled towards the recovery of Henan after having experienced severe flooding.

== Discography ==
=== Extended plays ===
Title	EP details	Sales
Xin	Released: May 20, 2018; Language: Mandarin; Label: Universal Music Group Enjoy Records; Formats: Digital download, streaming; Track listing: 1. "Hot Party"; 2. "Feel Good"; 3. "就是你"; 4. "不要想念你"	—N/a
EPSILON	Released: April 20, 2021; Language: Mandarin; Label: Universal Music Group Enjoy Records; Formats: Digital download, streaming; Track listing: 1. "Of Course"; 2. "U&I"; 3. "練習曲"	CHN: 5,881,426
Xanadu	Released: December 11, 2021; Language: Mandarin; Label: AMG Enjoy Records; Formats: Digital download, streaming; Track listing: 1. "Baby I know" 2. "Black sun white moon" 3. "Hurricane"; 4. "New and more" 5. "未知计划"; 6. "Look into the mirror" 7. "Like love" 8. "我和我"; 9. "Boom tick boom" 10. "Secret track - TBU"	—N/a

=== Singles ===
Title	Year	Album	Ref.
As lead artist
"从不" (Note: Pre-debut single.)	2015	Non-album single	
"2016 REM¥IX DAMN"	2018	Non-album single	
"Show Time"	2018	Xin	
"Eighteen"	2018	Non-album single	
"二字当头"	2020	Non-album single	
"两个ta"	2020	Non-album single	
"BEATHOLIC" (节奏病)	2020	Non-album single	
"BiuBiu" (Note: Song was released under The9, but a solo released by Liu Yuxin.)	2020	MatriX	
"Reality"	2024	Non-album single	
As featured artist
"穷得只剩音乐" (Teresa Tseng feat. Liu Yuxin and Zhang Youran)	2017	Hot Rival OST	
"Better" (Chinese Version) (BoA and Xin Liu)	2022	Non-album single	
"—" denotes releases that did not chart or were not released in that region.

== Filmography ==
=== Film ===
Year	Title	Original title	Role	Notes	Ref.
2018	Love Apartment	爱情公寓	DJ	Cameo	
2020	Dream Building	筑梦	Herself	Cosmo Hits short film Main role	

=== Television shows ===
Year	Title	Original title	Network	Notes / role	Ref.
2012	Up Young!	向上吧！少年	Hunan TV	Contestant/Champion	
2013	So You Think You Can Dance	舞林争霸	Dragon TV	Contestant	
2016	Lady Bees	蜜蜂少女队	Zhejiang TV	Contestant/Winner(debut)	
2017	The Rap of China	中国有嘻哈	iQiyi	Contestant/Passed the audition but left the show early due to schedule conflict	
2018	Hot Blood Dance Crew	热血街舞团	iQiyi	Contestant	
2019	Street Dance of China Season 2	這！就是街舞第二季	Youku	Contestant	
2020	Youth With You 2	青春有你2	iQiyi	Contestant/1st Place	
2020	Who's the Drama Queen?	青春加点戏	iQiyi	Youth With You 2 spin off acting reality show Cast member (ep 2, ep 7)	
2020	Let's Party! 2020	非日常派对	iQiyi	The9's first group-owned reality variety show(party themed show); Regular member	
2020	Masked Dancing King	蒙面舞王	Jiangsu TV	Contestant/Best Battle King	
2020	Street Dance of China Season 3	这！就是街舞第三季	Youku	Special guest/performer (Finale – ep 12)	
2020	Fourtry 2	潮流合伙人2	iQiyi	Cast member/trend partner	
2020	Let's Call it a day! (2020)	下班啦！合伙人第2季	iQiyi	Fourtry 2 spin off show (in house activities); Cast Member/trend partner	
2021	Praise For Songs/ Praise the Program	为歌而赞	Zhejiang TV	Guest/Performer with The9 (Ep 1–2)	
2021	Youth With You 3	青春有你3	iQIYI	Guest/Performer with The9 (ep 8)	
2021	Ni Hao Sheng Huo 3/ Hello, Life 3	你好生活第三季	CCTV	Guest (ep 3)	
2021	Jiayou Ganfanren	打卡吧！吃货团	Dragon TV	Main Cast member	
2021–2022	The Winter Dream Promise 2	冬梦之约 2	Beijing TV CCTV YOUKU	Guest (ep 4,9)	
2022	Super Team/Athletes Liangmeng	运动者联濛	Beijing TV Migu Video	Main Cast member	
2022	Hello Saturday/ Hi! 6	你好星期六	Hunan TV Mango TV	Guest (20220409)	
2022	Star Chaser Season 2	追星星的人2	Zhejiang TV	Guest host (ep 1–3)	

== Ambassadorships and endorsements ==
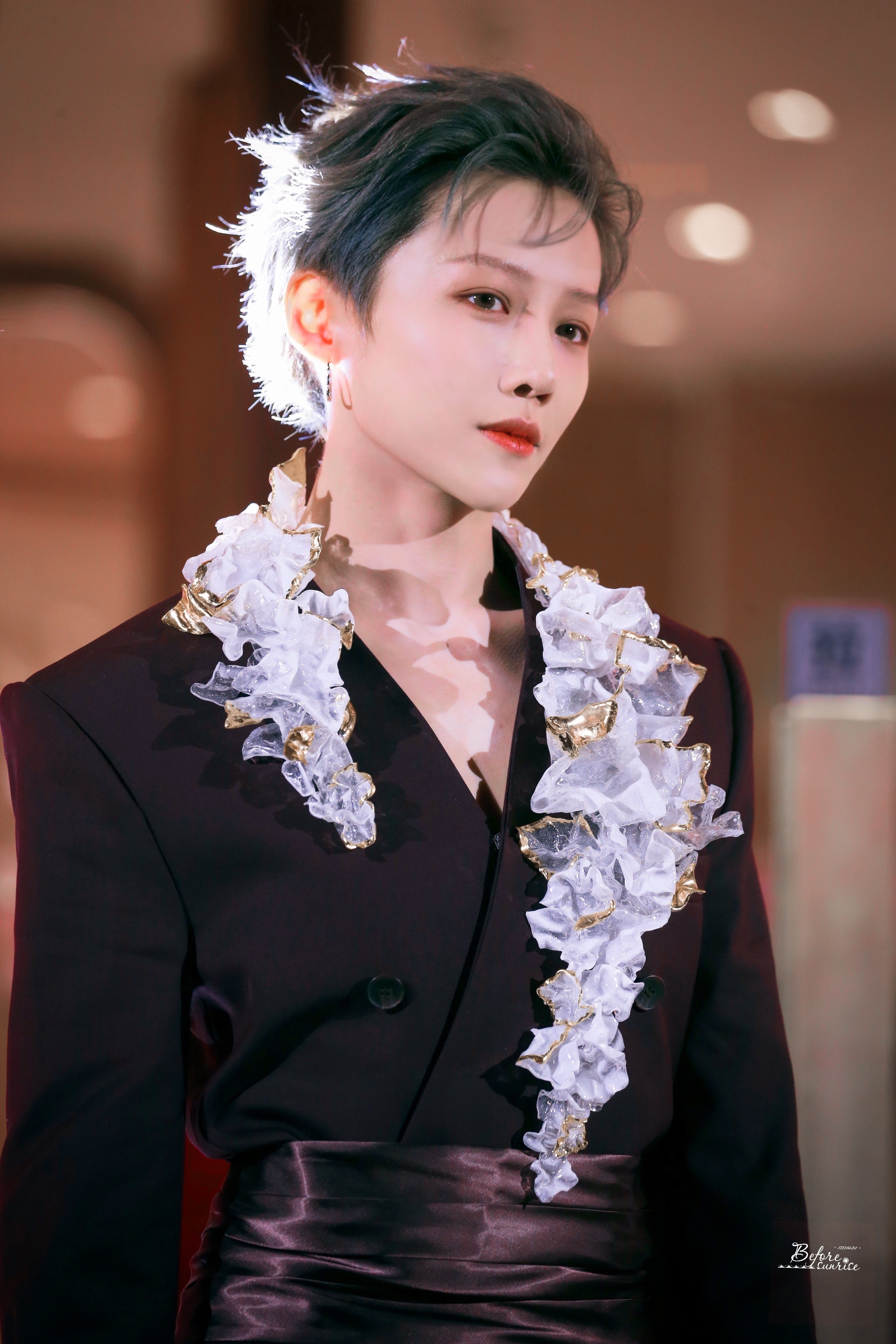
Xin attending Häagen-Dazs event on January 12th, 2021

=== Individual ===
Year	Brand	Title	Notes	Ref.
2019	Always/Whisper	Brand Best Friend		
2019	HANHOO	Recommender		
2020	Calvin Klein Underwear	Asia Region Spokesperson	Partnership ended on 3/25/2021	
2020	Dior	China Skincare Best Friend (June 2020 – December 2020)		
2020	Dior	China Brand Best Friend (December 2020 – December 2021)		
2020	Dior	Dior China Brand Ambassador (December 2021 – Present)		
2020	Make Up For Ever	Asia Pacific Region Brand Ambassador (Promoted to Global Brand Ambassador in January 2021)		
2020	CHOCDAY	Spokesperson		
2020	EZVALO	Spokesperson		
2020	Swisse Collagen Supplement Series	Spokesperson		
2020	DARLIE	Brand Ambassador		
2020	Dove	Brand Ambassador		
2020	Häagen-Dazs	Brand Ambassador (Promoted to Brand Spokesperson on May 31, 2021)		
2020	Penfolds MAX's Series	Brand Ambassador		
2020	SOFY Warmth Series	Ambassador (Promoted to SOFY brand Ambassador on 24 February 2021)		
2021	Make Up For Ever	Global Brand Ambassador (Promotion from APAC Region)		
2021	SOFY	Brand Ambassador (Promotion from SOFY Warmth Series Ambassador)		
2021	Xiaoming Classmate	Brand Spokesperson		
2021	Casio G-Shock	G-SHOCK Watch Spokesperson (First Female G-Shock official endorser/Spokesperson)		
2021	HEYPERFECT	Brand Spokesperson		
2021	SolidGold	First Global Spokesperson		
2021	Foreo	Global Spokesperson (Global Brand Ambassador)		
2021	Dior	Dior (China) Brand Ambassador		
2021	Haagen-Dazs	Brand Spokesperson		
2021	WonderLab	Brand Spokesperson		
2022	Kimtrue	First Body Care Spokesperson		
2022	Augustinus Bader	Hair Care Brand Spokesperson, China		
2022	Comvita	Global Spokesperson		
2022	Sisley Paris	Hair Rituel(Hair Care line) Brand Spokesperson		
2022	Ray-Ban	Greater China Brand Spokesperson		
2022	剑与远征 (AFK Arena / Games)	First Greater China Brand Spokesperson		
2023	Weibo Star Fashion week(Paris Fashion Week)	Recommended Officer		
2023	Dr.Ci:Labo	Asia Pacific Brand Spokesperson		
2023	New Era Cap	First Brand Spokesperson		
2023	2023 LVMH Prize	Presenter & Ambassador		
2023	Urban Revivo	First Global Brand Spokesperson		
2023	Coca-Cola	Coke Studio Spokesperson		
2023	PANDORA	Brand Spokesperson		
2025	Dior	Global Ambassador		
2025	Sisley Paris	Hair Rituel Asia Pacific Spokesperson		

=== Group ===
Year	Brand	Affiliation	Title	Ref.
2017	Nestle Maggi Mash Potatoes	Lady Bees	Spokesperson	
2020	Mengniu Real Fruit Yogurt	The9	Spokesperson	
2020	Nongfu Spring TOT Bubbly Tea Drink	The9	Spokesperson	
2020	Jade Dynasty Mobile Game	The9	Spokesperson	
2020	iQiyi 随刻 APP	The9	Referrer	
2020	iQiyi VIP Subscription	The9	Convenor	
2020	OPPO Reno4	The9	Brightest Girls	
2020	China Foundation for Poverty Alleviation – Everyone for Charity (人人公益)	The9	Charity Ambassador	

== Awards and recognition ==
=== Individual ===
Year	Ceremony/organization	Award	Ref.
2019	9th Annual Global Chinese Golden Chart	Infinity Award as Young Singer of the Year	
2020	Global Chinese Music	June Weekly Top Chart #1 – "Beatholic" (節奏病)	
2020	Southern Metropolis Entertainment	Top Ten People of the Year	
2020	14th Annual Migu Music Gala	Top Ten Song of the Year – "It's You" (就是你)	
2020	Sohu Fashion Award	Most Popular Celebrity	
2020	Forbes China – Arts and Sports	30 Under 30	
2020	iFeng (Phoenix Media) Annual Ranking	Most Popular Female Celebrity	
2020	iFeng (Phoenix Media) Entertainment End of the Year Special Campaign	Role Model of the Year	
2021	GALLERIA:28th Chinese Top Ten Music Awards/Eastern Billboard Music Festival	Most Popular Singer of the Year; Internet Most Influential Female Singer; Weibo Most Popular Female Singer	
2021	2021 Tencent TMEA Music Festival awards/ 3rd Tencent Music Entertainment Awards(TMEA)	Best Singing and Dancing Singer of the Year	
2021	2021 iFeng(Phoenix.com) Fashion Choice	Musician of the Year	
2022	Galleria: 29th Oriental(Eastern) Billboard Music Festival/Chinese Top Ten Music Awards	Most Popular Female Singer; Most Anticipated Stage by Netizens	
2022	2022 Weibo Music Festival	2022 Weibo Music Annual Top 10 Recommended Singers	
2022	2022 Asian Pop Music Awards	Record of the year "黑日白月" by Liu Yuxin; Top 20 Albums of the Year: Liu Yuxin's “Xanadu”; Top 20 Songs of the Year: "Better" by BoA ft Liu Yuxin; People's Choice Award: Top 2 BoA ft. Liu Yuxin "Better", Top 3 Liu Yuxin's “XANADU”	
2022	2022 QQ Music End of the Year Awards	Liu Yuxin “Xanadu”, 2022 QQ Music top ten albums of the year	
2023	Tencent TMEA 2022 Music Uni Chart List	Tencent Music 2022 top ten singer of the year; Tencent Music 2022 Uni Chart top ten Album of the Year – Liu Yuxin's “XANADU”; Tencent Music 2022 Uni Chart list top ten Singer of the Year; Tencent Music 2022 top ten Singer-Songwriter of the year; Tencent Music 2022 Top ten Music Video of the Year – Liu Yuxin's "Look Into the Mirror"; Tencent Music 2022 Uni Chart top ten charity theme song of the year – Liu Yuxin's "青春赋" and "守望者"; Tencent Music 2022 Uni Chart top ten promotions theme song of the year – Liu Yuxin's "幸会"; Tencent Music 2022 July Uni Chart top ten songs – BoA ft. Liu Yuxin "Better"	
2023	2022 Weibo Night	Breakthrough Musician of the Year	
2023	The 14th Chinese Golden Melody Awards	Dance Music Artist of the Year – Liu Yuxin “XANADU”	
2023	Tencent Music Entertainment Awards(TMEA) 2023	Most Influential Female Singer of the Year (Mainland China); TMEA New Force Producer of the Year	
2023	2023 Weibo Music Awards	Annual Recommended MV – Liu Yuxin's "#63EBE9"	

=== Group ===
Year	Ceremony/organization	Award	Affiliation	Ref.
2017	Global Chinese Music	April Weekly Top Chart #1 – GPS Seal	LadyBees	
2017	Most Influential Celebrity Award Ceremony	Most Popular Rookie Girl Group Award	LadyBees	
2017	Music Radio China Top Chart Award Ceremony	Best Stage Performance of the Year	LadyBees	
2017	Global Chinese Music	November Weekly Top Chart #1 – Where to Find You	LadyBees	
2017	Shanghai Fashion Festival	Most Popular Idol Group Award	LadyBees	
2020	Rayli Fashion Gala	Most Loved Group of the Year	The9	
2020	iFeng Fashion Choice	Fashion and Spirit Group of the Year	The9	
2020	MadameFigaro Beauty Star	Highlight Award	The9	
2020	Cosmo Glam Night	"Fearless Fashion" People of the Year	The9	
2020	Sina Fashion and Style Ceremony	Idol Group of the Year	The9	
2020	Asia Pop Music Awards	Most Popular Female Group	The9	
2020	iQiyi Scream Night	Popular Female Artist	The9	
2021	GALLERIA:28th Chinese Top Ten Music Awards/Eastern Billboard Music Festival	Most Popular Group	The9	
