= Street Dance of China =

2018 Chinese dance competition series

- Screenplay by: Wang Chenchen
- Directed by: Lu Wei
- Presented by: Liao Bo
- Judges: Huang Zitao Jackson Yee; Show Lo; Han Geng; Vanness Wu; Wallace Chung; Jackson Wang; Wang Yibo; Lay Zhang; Henry Lau; Lee Seung-hyun Liu Yuxin (singer)
- Country of origin: China
- Original language: Chinese
- No. of seasons: 6

Production
- Producer: Xu Xiangdong
- Production location: China
- Production companies: Youku; Tmall; Master; Canxing

Original release
- Network: Youku
- Release: 2018 – present

Related
- Street Dance of China Season 1 Street Dance of China Season 2 Street Dance of China Season 3 Street Dance of China Season 4 Street Dance of China Season 5 Street Dance Vietnam

Street Dance of China (SDC; simplified Chinese: 这！就是街舞; traditional Chinese: 這！就是街舞; pinyin: Zhè! Jiùshì jiēwǔ) is a Chinese dance competition show produced by Youku, Tmall, and Master, and co-produced with Canxing. It was first broadcast on Youku's online platform on February 24, 2018. The format of the program is a street dance selection reality show, the hip-hop champions are selected through auditions, individual battles and group battles. The show brings public awareness to various hip-hop dances such as Locking, Popping, Breaking, Hip-Hop, House, Jazz, Urban, Waacking, Krump, etc.

== Background ==
In January 2018, Youku released the "This! This is" series of variety shows; in the Spring Festival in April of the same year, Youku upgraded it to "This! This is the youthful state", and built it into an online variety brand. "This! It's Street Dance", now famously known as Street Dance of China, was the first work of this series on Youku. Through the mode of "star mentor + professional dancer reality show", the program adopts individual selection and team combat performances. Under the leadership of four captains, four teams are formed to conduct group dance battles between teams, and finally the overall champion will be selected.With its high popularity and discussion, Street Dance of China was determined to become the first phenomenal hit in 2018.

== Seasons ==
Season	Network	Judges	Air Date	Show Time
1	Youku	Huang Zitao, Jackson Yee, Show Lo, Han Geng	February 24, 2018	Saturday at 8:00pm
2	Youku	Jackson Yee, Show Lo, Han Geng, Vanness Wu	May 18, 2019	Saturday at 8:00pm
3	Youku	Wallace Chung, Jackson Wang, Wang Yibo, Lay Zhang	July 18, 2020	Saturday at 8:00pm
4	Youku	Wang Yibo, Lay Zhang, Han Geng, Henry Lau	August 14, 2021	Saturday at 8:00pm
5	Youku	Wang Yibo, Han Geng, Lee Seung-hyun, Liu Yuxin	August 13, 2022	Saturday at 8:00pm
6	Youku	Ding Chengxin, Vanness Wu, Jay Park	November 4, 2023	Saturday at 8:00pm

== Program Stages ==
=== Stage 1: Audition ===
Each of the four captains occupies a street, and dancers need to choose one of them to perform street dance. Only with the approval of the captain can they get a towel and successfully advance. There are a total of 100 promotion places (the promotion places may be slightly different in different seasons).

=== Stage 2: 100 to 49 ===
Dancers perform their own works in the order of drawing lots, and the captain will vote; if they get all the votes, they will be promoted directly; if they get 0 votes (the rules are slightly different in different seasons, some seasons are 0 votes Or 1 vote) they will be eliminated directly; the rest will enter the undetermined area, and the rest of the players can challenge. If no one refuses to accept the challenge, the dancer will advance directly; if anyone refuses to accept the challenge, the challenger needs to choose call out or battle (call out is an impromptu performance based on the performer's music, and the battle is a one-on-one impromptu duel for two people; different Season rules are slightly different, some seasons may only have one of call out or battle); if multiple dancers refuse to accept the challenge, a challenger will be selected by spinning the bottle; the captain will still carry out the challenge if they refuse to accept the challenge Voting, the one with the most votes wins; if there is a tie, the penalty will be slightly different in different seasons, some seasons are an extra round of battle, some seasons are considered to be won by the challenger, and some seasons are considered to be the winner of the challenger; if If the challenger fails, he will lose the opportunity to show his personal performance and be eliminated directly. Different seasons have slightly different competition systems in this round. In some seasons, various dance styles may be divided into two groups for a duel to determine the work group and the challenge group.

=== Stage 3: The Group Dance Duel ===
All dancers are divided into 8 groups, each group choreographs the dance according to the music drawn, and competes in pairs. After the 24-hour choreography, 8 groups of contestants will dance in pairs. The four team captains will judge the winners. All the winners will advance. After all the eight groups of competitions are over, all the undetermined players will start the tiebreaker; the order of appearances will be determined by turning the bottle, and a 1-on-1 dance will be performed within the specified time. The winner will be voted by the captain. The loser enters the end of the team and waits for the fight; the top three players in points within the specified time advance, and if someone beats all the players in a row or accumulates the specified points (usually the number of participants in the tiebreaker is reduced by one), they will advance directly.

=== Stage 4: The Teams Are Grouped ===
A two-way selection method is adopted in the robbery battle. The room of four dancers is opened at a time, and each captain can chat with the four, but only one favorite player can be selected among the four. Hang the towel at the door of the room where the player is. After the selection of the four captains, the players will invert the selection. If the two sides choose each other, they will be paired to join the team. Otherwise, the players will enter the waiting area. There are cases where players are eliminated from being selected into the team in this stage).

=== Stage 5: The Semi-Finals ===
The rules of the semi-finals are different in different seasons. The teams will compete in dance duels, one-on-one battles, etc., and the points system will be adopted.

=== Stage 6: Semi-Finals ===
The semi-final is divided into two stages. The first stage is the fusion of dance styles, including national standard dance, modern and contemporary dance, classical dance, folk dance, etc. The winners will directly advance to the finals, and the losers will enter the second stage - the tiebreaker (the rules are slightly different in different seasons, and in some seasons, there are three groups competing in two groups), the tiebreaker The top three will enter the finals, and the rest of the dancers will be eliminated.

=== Stage 7: The Resurrection ===
Some of the popular dancers eliminated in the semi-finals will compete in a tie-breaker.

=== Stage 8: The Finals ===
The finals are divided into four parts: captain show, personal work competition, team dance, and final dissatisfaction. The order of appearance in the individual composition competition is generally determined by the results of the captain's show (the rules are slightly different in different seasons, and in some seasons, the captain's show does not score, and the order of appearance in the individual composition competition is determined by lottery); each dancer's individual In the work competition, more than ten other dancers are required to form a dance group to complete the work together; the top four in the individual work competition become the top four (the rules are slightly different in different seasons, and in some seasons, there are four groups after each group is divided into four groups. One becomes the top four), and enters the battle dance stage of the team; the team battle dance needs to be completed by the top four dancers and their dancers together, and the winner enters the final stage of disobedience. The ultimate disobedience part is a one-on-one dance, a total of 25 rounds, divided into five rounds to complete, and the number of rounds in each round is 7, 6, 5, 4, and 3 rounds; after each round, the host will ask the dancers about their clothes. If one side concedes defeat, the other side wins directly. If neither side concedes defeat, a vote is held, and the dancer who wins the first three rounds becomes the annual champion.

== Production ==
In order to bring hip-hop back to the streets, the program team specially built a real-life stage, which was integrated with the characteristic streets.

The creative stage art of the program team created the "Land of Freedom", a main stage that integrates future sci-fi style and oriental characteristic blocks. There are more than 100 cameras arranged in the four streets of the stage, almost every square meter has 1 camera.

== Reception ==
The first episode of "This! It's Street Dance" has 6.35 million views.

The Beijing News praised the shows captains for their strong dancing skills and the show itself for break the niche pop culture circle.

Guangming.com reviewed the show as using the sunny hip-hop culture to stimulate the positive energy of young people.

Huasheng Entertainment commended Street Dance of China for not only conveying the rich variety of dance styles and the concept of freedom and improvement to the audience, but also showing the real form of hip-hop, allowing hip-hop culture to enter the public's field of vision. "Not only can we see the spirit of the times that Chinese young people are full of confidence and dare to challenge, but also see the fusion of traditional Chinese cultural elements and street dance, releasing the creative charm of Chinese dancers".

NetEase Entertainment quoted the show as making hip-hop culture collide with Chinese culture on the stage. "The addition of Chinese songs gives hip-hop a refreshing feeling, and makes the familiar melody of the past show a new side. The creative fusion of classic songs and hip-hop not only shortens the distance between hip-hop and the audience, showing its variability and innovation, but also brings new vitality to classic old songs, broadening the creative ideas of pop music to a certain extent, and providing Chinese music. offers a wider range of possibilities.

== Awards and nominations ==
Year	Award	Category	Recipient	Result	Ref
2019	Jinguduo Internet Film and Television Festival	Annual Quality Network Variety Show	Street Dance of China	Won	
2020	General Office of the State Administration of Radio, Film and Television	Outstanding Overseas Communication Works in 2020	Street Dance of China Season 3	Won	
2022	2022 Weibo Vision Conference	2022 Weibo Vision Conference Shimmer Glory Works Variety Show	Street Dance of China	Won	

== International versions ==
Country	Local Name	Network	Year Aired
Vietnam	Street Dance Việt Nam	HTV	2022

== Controversies ==
Originally scheduled to appear in Street Dance of China, the star captain Jackson Wang, jumped to the same type of variety show Hot Blood Dance Crew, which caused dissatisfaction with the producer Youku, while the artist Jackson responded that "it is purely a normal business choice."

The program team first apologized for misspelling Yi Yang Qianxi's name on the signboard. After the second episode aired, the show made a public apology for Huang Zitao's misleading editing. After the program was released one after another, Han Geng (Gengxin Studio) asked the producer to apologize to the Devil Editing, and Luo Zhixiang also posted a Weibo protest against the program group, maliciously reversing the sequence of the films, and deliberately creating confrontation among fans.
