= Liu Jun =

Liu Jun may refer to:

- Liu Jun, Prince Shixing (429–453), imperial prince of the Liu Song dynasty
- Liu Jun, personal name of Emperor Xiaowu of Song (430–464) and half-brother of the Prince of Shixing
- Liu Jun (Southern Han) (9th-century–10th-century), chancellor of Southern Han
- Liu Jun (Northern Han) (926–968), emperor of Northern Han
- Liu Jun (painter), Ming dynasty painter
- Jun S. Liu (born 1965), Chinese-American statistician
- Liu Jun (badminton) (born 1968), Chinese badminton player
- Liu Jun (basketball) (born 1969), Chinese basketball player
- Liu Jun (banker) (born 1972), Chinese banker and politician
- Liu Jun (go player) (1975–2004), winner of the 1996 and 1997 World Amateur Go Championship
- Liu Jun (footballer) (born 1983), Chinese football goalkeeper
- Jun Liu (born 1997), also known as Liu Jun (choreographer), Malaysian choreographer, singer, dancer.
- Liu Jun (actor) (born 2002), Chinese actor
