= Deng Xiaoci =

Chinese actor and singer (born 1998)

- Born: August 6, 1998 (age 28); Guizhou, China
- Other name: Jerome
- Education: Temple University
- Occupations: Actor; singer
- Years active: 2021–present
- Agent: Haixi Culture Media
- Height: 183 cm (6 ft 0 in)
- Musical career
- Genres: Mandopop; Hip hop
- Instrument: Vocals
- Labels: Idol Youth; RE Media
- Formerly of: IXForm

Chinese name
- Simplified Chinese: 邓孝慈

Deng Xiaoci (Chinese: 邓孝慈, born August 6, 1998) is a Chinese actor and singer. He is best known for his roles in The Tower of Whispers (2025) and Love in the Clouds (2025). He is also known for participating in iQIYI's reality survival show Youth With You 3, debuting as the member of the final group IXForm.

== Discography ==
=== Singles ===
Year	Title	Album
2022	"Flight" (飞行模式)	Non-single album

== Filmography ==
=== Web series ===
Year	Title	Role	Ref.
2024	Palace Shadows: Between Two Princes	Shen Mo	
2024	Love in Devil	Mu Ting	
2025	The Tower of Whispers	Jun Che / Xiao Wu	
2025	Aligned Reverence	Xie Yunyan	
2026	Seeds of Scarlet Longing	Shen Yuheng	
2026	Daughter of Fortune	Nangong Xuan Yu	
TBA	The Great Queen	Shi Si / You Huang	

=== Television series ===
Year	Title	Role	Notes	Ref.
2025	Les Belles	Fan Qingchen		
2025	Love in the Clouds	Xun Ming		
2025	Whispers of Fate	Jiang Cheng		
2025	Sword and Beloved	Li Muhai		
2026	The Legend of Rosy Clouds	Wei Rong		
2026	Angels and Guards	Fa Yuanrong		
TBA	Classmates Cha Cha Cha	Xiao Zhexue		
TBA	Wanhua Sin			

=== Television shows ===
Year	Title	Role	Ref.
2021	Youth With You 3	Contestant	

== Awards and nominations ==
Year	Award	Category	Nominee(s)/Work(s)	Result	Ref.
2025	Tencent Video Star Awards	Short Drama Actor of the Year	Deng Xiaoci	Won	
