= The Game Changer =

2017 Chinese action film

- Poster
- Chinese: 游戏规则
- Directed by: Gao Xixi
- Starring: Peter Ho; Huang Zitao; Guli Nazha; Wang Xueqi
- Release date: February 10, 2017
- Running time: 140 minutes
- Country: China
- Language: Mandarin
- Box office: CN¥101,343,000 US$14,669,320

The Game Changer (Chinese: 游戏规则) is a 2017 Chinese action film directed by Gao Xixi, starring Peter Ho, Huang Zitao, Guli Nazha and Wang Xueqi. Inspired from the television series Shanghai Bund, the film is set in 1930s Shanghai. It was released in China on February 10, 2017 in 2D, 3D and China Film Giant Screen.

== Synopsis ==
Lin Zihao and Fang Jie are two brothers who have gone through life and death with each other. However, Mr. Tang's daughter Tang Qianqian, whom Fang Jie has admired for long, falls in love with Lin Zihao at first sight. At the same time, Lin Zihao finds out that his lover Lan Ruoyun has been captured by Mr. Tang to be his mistress while he was being chased. In order to dominate Shanghai, Mr. Tang has set up a conspiracy, and the most important part of his plan is actually Lin Zihao. However, Mr. Tang does not realize that Lin Zihao's identity is a member of the Blue Shirts Society. The two ultimately go heads on with each other - but who will emerge victorious in this bloody battle?

== Cast ==
- Peter Ho as Lin Zihao
- Huang Zitao as Fang Jie
- Guli Nazha as Tang Qianqian
- Wang Xueqi as Tang Hexuan (Mr. Tang)
- Choo Ja-hyun as Lan Ruoyun
- Jack Kao
- Long Meizi as Bai Guang

== Release ==
The film was picked up by Well Go USA and CDC United Network, were the distributors for North America, United Kingdom, Australia, New Zealand, and Latin America.

== Reception ==
The film grossed CN¥ 5.3 million (US$2,259,054) on its opening weekend. It grossed CN¥ 101.34 million (US$14,669,320) in China.
