= IXForm =

Chinese boy band

- Origin: China
- Genres: C-pop; Mandopop
- Years active: 2021–2022
- Labels: ADQC; iQIYI
- Past members: Luo Yizhou; Tang Jiuzhou; Lian Huaiwei; Liu Guanyou; Deng Xiaoci; Sun Yinghao; Liu Jun; Duan Xingxing; Sun Yihang

Ixform (pronounced as "X Form", stylized in all caps) was a Chinese project boy group formed through the 2021 Chinese survival show Youth With You 3 on iQIYI. The group consisted of 9 members: Luo Yizhou, Tang Jiuzhou, Lian Huaiwei, Liu Guanyou, Deng Xiaoci, Sun Yinghao, Jun Liu, Duan Xingxing and Sun Yihang. The group was formed on July 29, 2021, and released their debut EP, Coming, on November 5, 2021. The group later disbanded on November 8, 2022.

== Career ==
=== Formation ===
IXFORM was formed through Youth With You Season 3 and aired from February 18 to May 1, 2021. The show's finale was initially set on May 8, where the debut team would be formed. However, the finale was cancelled beforehand after an order from Chinese media government bureau, as the show was embroiled in the milk-wasting controversy. The group with the top 9 lineup was alleged to have been formed, but iQIYI denied the allegations in May 2021.

On July 25, 2021, the group with the same top 9 lineup made their first group appearance on Chengdu Music Festival and announced that they had officially debuted. The group promoted for around 1 year and a half, and the management rights were handled by Idol Youth Entertainment of iQIYI.

== Members ==
- Luo Yizhou (罗一舟) Center
- Tang Jiuzhou (唐九洲)
- Lian Huaiwei (连淮伟)
- Liu Guanyou (劉冠佑
- Deng Xiaoci (鄧孝慈)
- Sun Yinghao (孙滢皓)
- Liu Jun (刘隽)
- Duan Xingxing (段星星)
- Sun Yihang (孙亦航)

== Discography ==
Extended Plays
Title	Details	Peak Chart Positions	Sales
Coming (将至)	Released: November 5, 2021; Labels: ADQC, iQIYI; Formats: Digital download, streaming; Track listing: 1. So Hot; 2. BET	—	—N/a

=== Singles ===
Title	Year	Album
"Bet"	2021	将至
"Thin Line"	2022	Thin Line
"With You"	2022	Non-album single

== Filmography ==
=== Reality Shows ===
Year	English title	Chinese title	Network	Member	Notes	Ref.
2021	Youth with You Season 3	青春有你3	iQIYI	All	Contestants	
2021	Perfect Summer 2 Special Edition	完美的夏天特别篇	Dragon Television	Luo Yizhou, Lian Huaiwei, Liu Guanyou		
2021	Glory is Back! Luo Yang	登场了！洛阳	iQIYI	Luo Yizhou, Tang Jiuzhou, Lian Huaiwei, Liu Jun		
2022			iQIYI			
2022	Rush Forward	哔哩哔哩向前冲	BiliBili	Sun Yihang, Duan Xingxing, Liu Guanyou		
