= Street Dance of China Season 1 =

- Season 1
- Hosted by: Liao Bo
- Judges: Yi Yang Qianxi; Luo Zhixiang; Han Geng; Huang Zitao
- Winner: Han Yu
- Runner-up: Tian Yide

Release
- Original network: Youku
- Original release: February 24 – May 13, 2018

The first season of Street Dance of China (SDC1; simplified Chinese: 这！就是街舞 第一季; traditional Chinese: 這！就是街舞 第一季; pinyin: Zhè! Jiùshì jiēwǔ dì yī jì) premiered on Youku at 20:00 every Saturday from February 24, 2018, and ended on May 13, 2018. It has a total of 12 episodes featuring the star captains Yi Yang Qianxi, Luo Zhixiang, Han Geng, and Huang Zitao. Through the mode of "star mentor + professional dancer reality show", the program adopts individual selection and team combat performances. Under the leadership of four captains, four teams are formed to conduct group dance battles between teams, and finally the overall champion will be selected. Han Yu, a member of Yi Yang Qianxi team, won the championship.

== Program Stages ==
=== Stage 1: Audition ===
The four captains incarnated as "Street Fighters" and guarded their respective streets. The dancers needed to choose one of them for street dance demonstrations. Only with the approval of the captains can they successfully advance. Each street has 25 promotion places.

=== Stage 2: 100 to 49 ===
The contestants need to perform their own works in the order of drawing lots. The three captains except the audition captain will vote: 3 votes will be directly promoted, and 1 vote or 0 votes will be eliminated directly. Get 2 votes to enter the pending area; if no one calls out (not accepting the challenge), you will advance. Otherwise, the challenger needs to perform freestyle (improvisation) according to the music of the performer. The result of the game is voted by the 4 captains: the one with the most votes wins, and the tie Tickets are one more (extra round) until the winner is determined; if the challenger fails, they will lose the opportunity to solo (solo) and be eliminated directly. way to select a challenger.

=== Stage 3: 49 to 44 ===
The top 49 players scrambled and regrouped into 8 groups, choreographed a dance within 24 hours, and competed in pairs. The music and the competition group were determined by drawing lots. After the 24-hour choreography, 8 groups of contestants will perform a dance show in pairs. The winner will be determined by the four captains. All members of the winner group will advance. link. After all the eight groups of competitions are over, all the undetermined players will start the "tie-breaker" battle: the order of appearance is determined by turning the bottle, and a 1-on-1 dance will be performed within the specified time. The captain will vote to determine the winner. Lord, the loser enters the end of the line and waits for a fight. The top three points in the specified time will advance to the top 44, but if someone beats all the fighting players in a row, they will advance directly.

=== Stage 4: The Teams Are Divided Into Groups (44 into 40) ===
The robbery battle adopts the method of two-way selection. The room of four dancers is opened at a time. Each captain can chat with the four, but only one of the four can be selected. A favorite player hangs the towel at the door of the room where the player is. After the four captains have been selected, the players will conduct inverse elections. If the two sides choose each other, they will be paired to join the team, otherwise the players will enter the waiting area.

=== Stage 5: The Team Competes for Hegemony ===
40 into 28: The four teams will face each other in two groups, and each group will use the same music for three rounds: after each round, the audience will vote, and the winner will get one point. After the three rounds of competition, the team with three points is safe, otherwise, for each point missing, the captain will choose two players from his team to be eliminated.

28 into 21: Each team divides itself into two groups, and arranges troops according to the captain to fight against other teams. After every two teams compete, the audience votes, all the winners will advance, and the losers will immediately eliminate two performers.

=== Stage 6: The Strong Breakout Competition (21 to 12) ===
The pas de deux works are displayed. Two players from the same team work together to complete a dance work. The captain will choose one of the two, and one person will be directly promoted. At the same time, the on-site jury will vote for each work. After the ten sets of works are finished, the performers of the two sets of works with the highest votes will be promoted.

=== Stage 7: Semi-finals (12 into 7) ===
The top 12 players decided to perform one of the six themes of "Gold, Wood, Water, Fire, Earth, This is Hip-hop" by drawing lots, and the cooperation performance is no longer limited For the contestants, they are paired with classical dancers, folk dancers, ballet dancers, national standard dancers, modern dancers, and hip-hop dancers. Each dancer who advances to the semi-finals will not only perform the same theme, but also partner with the same professional dancer from other dance styles. After the top 6 places were determined by the competition, the battle for points was started again to compete for the last place to advance to the finals. The 6 losers will decide the order of appearance by turning the bottle, and they will have a 1-on-1 dance within the specified time. The player with the highest points within the specified time will directly advance to the finals, but if someone beats all the fighting players in a row, they will advance directly.

=== Stage 8: The Finals ===
The finals are divided into four rounds, and the rules for each round are completely different. They are the opening show qualifying match, the guests help dance, the team fight dance, and the limit fight dance.

== Production ==
In order to bring hip-hop back to the streets, the program team specially built a real-life stage to integrate with the characteristic streets.

The program team reproduced four streets representing different regional cultures one by one: Shanghai Shikumen Street full of clothes drying bamboo poles and clothes, old Beijing China Red Street with lantern red walls and courtyard gates, Guangzhou with heavy warehouses and iron gates The arcade street, the extreme future street with dilapidated brick walls, backboard racks and skateboard slides, four streets of 8m x 19m converge in an X-shape towards the center. The main stage is a combination of sci-fi and Chinese elements, and various styles are mixed and matched, representing the imagination of the future city.

== Episodes and Results ==
=== Episode 1 (February 24, 2018) ===
The four captains opened the hip-hop show, and they crossed over to dance to their full potential, and launched a "space battle" on their own exclusive streets. Finally, the four broke through the dimensional wall together, presenting a mix and match on the center stage. coexisting works.

The four captains incarnated as "Street Fighters" and guarded their respective streets. The dancers chose one of them for a street dance show, and they were successfully promoted when they were approved by the captain. There are only 25 promotion places per street, and the promotion probability is comparable to "Battle Royale".

=== Episode 2 (March 3, 2018) ===
More than halfway through the audition, the competition schedule is more intense, the remaining promotion places are getting fewer and fewer, and the four captains are getting better and better.

The large number of candidates for the audition and the sharp reduction in the number of promotions in the captain's hands made the players feel under pressure, and they used their killer skills one after another. Programs with different characteristics appeared one after another, such as Western hip-hop with Chinese elements.

=== Episode 3 (March 10, 2018) ===
The audition has come to an end, and the top 100 list has been released. The top 100 entered the top 49, and a new cruel competition system was established. The four captains staged a "robbing" battle. For the first time, the four captains were in the same frame in the program at the same time, and jointly selected the top 49.

The 100-to-49 competition system is harsh. Once the top 49 are advanced, the players who do not perform after the top 49 will "die" directly. This kind of competition system caused the players with the lower serial numbers to take the initiative to call out in order to seize the opportunity to perform, and there was a fight within the team.

=== Episode 4 (March 17, 2018) ===
In this issue, the top 49 battles will continue. More hip-hop masters appeared in the show, and the four captains announced the selection criteria for the new link and opened the "mutual confrontation" mode. Top 49 revealed.

=== Episode 5 (March 24, 2018) ===
In this issue, the contestants are divided into 8 groups, and the 24-hour choreography will compete in pairs. The dancers, who were mostly individual battles before, are engaged in a "team battle" this time. The round-the-clock rehearsal not only challenges the dancers' physical limits, but also a great test of their psychological quality. The four captains specially came to visit the class to accompany them until late at night.

=== Episode 6 (March 31, 2018) ===
The top 44 results of this "tiebreaker" match were announced. Then the four captains staged "36 strategies" to build their own teams. For the first time, the team assembled to perform a team show.

=== Episode 7 (April 7, 2018) ===
| Teams | Chinese name | Contestants |
|---|---|---|
| Show Lo Team | 修楼梯 | He Zhancheng, Xu Shaolin, Jixiang, Xie Wenke, Tian Yide, Nikki, Wang Yuanzhen, Kangaroo, Tongtong, Milk Ball |
| Jackson Team | 易燃装置 | Zhang Tianci, Snake Man, Xiao P, Sun Weijun, Lin Meng, Zhong Chen, Zhou Xingsu, Liangliang, Han Yu, Liyu |
| Hangeng Team | 态度大师 | Zuo Zuo, Ma Dongjie, Dian Men, Deng Xiaoting, A Xin, Xiao Fei, Long Zai, Li Yan, Lingo, Ah Wei |
| Tao Team | 西泡泡 | Dan Dan, Zeng Taoling, Liu Ye, Yang Yajie, Wang Ziqi, Xiao Xiao Hei, Lei Xiao Yang, Yang Wenhao, Shitou, Ah Suan |

| Match | Rounds | Contestants | Results | Ref |
|---|---|---|---|---|
| Match 1 Show Lo Team VS Jackson Team | Round 1 | He Zhancheng, Xu Shaolin, Jixiang VS Zhang Tianci, Snake Man, Xiao P, Sun Weijun | Show Lo Team wins | |
| Match 1 Show Lo Team VS Jackson Team | Round 2 | Xie Wenke, Tian Yide, Nikki, Wang Yuanzhen VS Lin Meng, Zhong Chen, Zhou Xingsu | Show Lo Team wins | |
| Match 1 Show Lo Team VS Jackson Team | Round 3 | Kangaroo, Tongtong, Milk Ball VS Liangliang, Han Yu, Liyu | Jackson Team wins | |
| Match 1 Show Lo Team VS Jackson Team | Jackson Team eliminated members: Lin Meng, Liyu, Zhang Tianci, and Zhong Chen; Show Lo Team eliminated members: Wang Yuanzhen and Xu Shaolin | | | |
| Match 2 Hangeng Team VS Tao Team | Round 1 | Zuo Zuo, Ma Dongjie, Dian Men, Deng Xiaoting VS Dan Dan, Zeng Taoling, Liu Ye, Yang Yajie | Tao Team wins | |
| Match 2 Hangeng Team VS Tao Team | Round 2 | A Xin, Xiao Fei, Long Zai, Li Yan VS Wang Ziqi, Xiao Xiao Hei, Lei Xiao Yang | Hangeng Team wins | |
| Match 2 Hangeng Team VS Tao Team | Round 3 | Lingo, Ah Wei VS Yang Wenhao, Shitou, Ah Suan | Tao Team wins | |
| Match 2 Hangeng Team VS Tao Team | Hangeng Team eliminated members: Ma Dongjie, Long Zai, Xiaofei, and A Xin; Tao Team eliminated members: Lei Xiaoyang and Zeng Taoling | | | |

=== Episode 8 (April 14, 2018) ===
| Captain | Chinese name | Contestants |
|---|---|---|
| Show Lo Team | 修楼梯 | He Zhancheng, Jixiang, Xie Wenke, Tian Yide, Nikki, Kangaroo, Tongtong, Milk Ball |
| Jackson Team | 易燃装置 | Snake Man, Xiao P, Sun Weijun, Zhou Xingsu, Liangliang, Han Yu, |
| Hangeng Team | 态度大师 | Zuo Zuo, Dian Men, Deng Xiaoting, Li Yan, Lingo, Ah Wei |
| Tao Team | 西泡泡 | Dan Dan, Liu Ye, Yang Yajie, Wang Ziqi, Xiao Xiao Hei, Yang Wenhao, Shitou, Ah Suan |

| Match | Rounds | Contestants | Results | Ref |
|---|---|---|---|---|
| Match 1 | Round 1 Hangeng Team VS Jackson Team | Ah Wei, Lingo, Deng Xiaoting VS Han Yu, Liangliang, Snake Man | Jackson Team wins Hangeng eliminates Lingo and Deng Xiaoting | |
| Match 1 | Round 2 Tao Team VS Show Lo Team | Yang Wenhao, Wang Ziqi, Shitou, Ah Suan VS Kangaroo, Tong Tong, Milk Ball, Tian Yide, Xie Wenke | Show Lo Team wins Tao eliminates Ah Suan and Shitou | |
| Match 2 | Round 1 Tao Team VS Show Lo Team | Dan Dan, Yang Yajie, Liu Ye, Xiao Xiao Hei VS He Zhancheng, Nikki, Jixiang | Tao Team wins Show Lo eliminates He Zhancheng and Jixiang | |
| Match 2 | Round 2 Hangeng Team VS Jackson Team | Dian Men, Zuo Zuo, Li Yan VS Zhou Xingsu, Xiao P, Sun Weijun | Jackson Team wins Hangeng eliminates Dian Men and Zuo Zuo | |
| Match 3 | Yang Wenhao of Tao Team succeeded in saving people, and Huang Zitao chose to revive Ah Suan | | | |

=== Episode 9 (April 21, 2018) ===
| Captain | Chinese name | Contestants |
|---|---|---|
| Show Lo Team | 修楼梯 | Xie Wenke, Tian Yide, Nikki, Kangaroo, Tongtong, Milk Ball |
| Jackson Team | 易燃装置 | Snake Man, Xiao P, Sun Weijun, Zhou Xingsu, Liangliang, Han Yu, |
| Hangeng Team | 态度大师 | Li Yan, Ah Wei |
| Tao Team | 西泡泡 | Dan Dan, Liu Ye, Yang Yajie, Wang Ziqi, Xiao Xiao Hei, Yang Wenhao, Ah Suan |

| Match | Round | Contestants | Results | Ref |
|---|---|---|---|---|
| Match 1 | Jackson Team | Han Yu VS Zhou Xingsu | Han Yu wins | |
| Match 2 | Tao Team | Wang Ziqi VS Xiao Xiao Hei | Wang Ziqi wins | |
| Match 3 | Show Lo Team | Xie Wenke VS Tong Tong | Xie Wenke wins | |
| Match 4 | Tao Team | Yang Yajie VS Yang Wenhao | Yang Wenhao wins | |
| Match 5 | Show Lo Team | Tian Yide VS Nikki | Tian Yide wins | |
| Match 6 | Jackson Team | Sun Weijun VS Xiao P | Xiao P wins | |
| Match 7 | Tao Team | Dan Dan VS Liu Ye VS Ah Suan | Dan Dan wins | |
| Match 8 | Hangeng Team | Li Yan VS Ah Wei | Li Yan wins | |
| Match 9 | Show Lo Team | Milk Ball VS Kangaroo | Milk Ball wins | |
| Match 10 | Jackson Team | Liangliang VS Snake Man | Liangliang wins | |
The two works of Li Yan and Ah Wei, and Liangliang and Snake Man have the highest audience votes, while Ah Wei and Snake Man are promoted

=== Episode 10 (April 28, 2018) ===
| Captain | Chinese name | Contestants |
|---|---|---|
| Show Lo Team | 修楼梯 | Xie Wenke, Tian Yide, Milk Ball |
| Jackson Team | 易燃装置 | Snake Man, Xiao P, Liangliang, Han Yu, |
| Hangeng Team | 态度大师 | Li Yan, Ah Wei |
| Tao Team | 西泡泡 | Dan Dan, Wang Ziqi, Yang Wenhao |

| Match | Rounds | Contestants | Results | Ref |
|---|---|---|---|---|
| Match 1 | Round 1 The theme "fire", fusion ballroom dance | Wang Ziqi VS Han Yu | Han Yu wins | |
| Match 1 | Round 2 The theme of "earth", fusion of modern dance | Li Yan VS Tian Yide | Tian Yide wins | |
| Match 1 | Round 3 Theme "Wood", fusion of folk dance | Ah Wei VS Dan Dan | Ah Wei wins | |
| Match 1 | Round 4 Theme "Water", Fusion Ballet | Snake Man VS Yang Wenhao | Yang Wenhao wins | |
| Match 1 | Round 5 Theme "Gold", fusion of classical dance | Liangliang VS Xie Wenke | Xie Wenke wins | |
| Match 1 | Round 6 Theme "This is Street Dance" | Milk ball VS Xiao P | Xiao P wins | |
| Match 2 | Liangliang wins the scoring battle and advances | | | |

=== Episode 11 (May 5, 2018) ===
| Captain | Chinese name | Contestants |
|---|---|---|
| Show Lo Team | 修楼梯 | Xie Wenke, Tian Yide |
| Jackson Team | 易燃装置 | Xiao P, Liangliang, Han Yu, |
| Hangeng Team | 态度大师 | Ah Wei |
| Tao Team | 西泡泡 | Yang Wenhao |

| Match | Rounds | Contestants | Results | Ref |
|---|---|---|---|---|
| Match 1 Opening show qualifying | Show Lo Team VS Jackson Team VS Hangeng Team VS Tao Team | | 1st: Jackson Team 2nd: Tao Team 3rd: Show Lo Team 4th: Hangeng Team | |
| Match 2 Guest Help Dance | Round 1 | Han Yu VS Ah Wei | Han Yu wins | |
| Match 2 Guest Help Dance | Round 2 | Yang Wenhao VS Liangliang | Yang Wenhao wins | |
| Match 2 Guest Help Dance | Round 3 | Xiao P VS Xie Wenke VS Tian Yide | Xie Wenke and Tian Yide wins | |
| Match 3 Battle Dance | Round 1 | Xie Wenke VS Tian Yide | Tian Yide wins | |
| Match 3 Battle Dance | Round 2 | Han Yu VS Yang Wenhao | Han Yu wins | |
| Match 4 Time Limit Dance | Tian Yide VS Han Yu | | Han Yu wins | |

=== Episode 12 (May 13, 2018) ===
The tense atmosphere of the annual festival has changed. The dancers danced together to enjoy the festival, and even the captains and players collectively refused to accept the challenge of the program group.

== Choreographers ==
- Keone & Mari
- Lyle Beniga
- Phillip Chbeeb
- Galen Hooks
- Jeff Phi Nguyen
- Russell Ferguson
