= Tianjin University of Sport =

University in Tianjin, China

Coordinates: 39.074473°N 117.187461°E

- 天津体育学院
- Type: Public
- Established: 1958
- President: Yao Jiaxing
- Location: Tianjin, China
- Campus: urban
- Website: www.tjus.edu.cn

Tianjin University of Sport (Chinese: 天津体育学院; pinyin: Tiānjīn Tǐyù Xuéyuàn), formerly translated as Tianjin Institute of Physical Education, is a university in Tianjin, China under the municipal government.

The university was founded in August 1958. It was established to meet the needs for Physical Education teachers mostly in the northern part of China. At that time, Tianjin was the capital city of Hebei Province. The first president of the university was Mr. Gengtao Li, deputy-governor, general-secretary of the Communist Party and mayor then. Prof. Dr. Jiaxing Yao, a well-known sports psychologist, serves as the current president and Mr. Wengming Feng is the general-secretary of the Communist Party in the university.

Tianjin University of Sport is located in the HeXi District of Tianjin, one of the four municipal cities in China.

As of the beginning of 2009, the university has two colleges and seven departments. Academically, the university has been noted for its teaching and research on sports science especially in the fields of exercise physiology and sports sociology. The university holds the lab of exercise physiology, one of the key labs heavily funded by local government. The university offers the courses leading to Ph.D., M.S., M.A., and B.A. degrees.
