= Z.TAO (EP) =

EP by Z.Tao
- Released: August 19, 2015
- Genre: Dance
- Language: Mandarin
- Label: Huang Z.TAO Studio

Z.Tao chronology
T.A.O (2015)	Z.TAO (2015)	The Road (2016)

Z.TAO is the second EP of the Chinese rapper and singer Z.Tao, released on August 19, 2015 by Huang Z.TAO Studio.

== Background and release ==
After releasing his first mini album T.A.O and his single M.O.M., Tao's studio announced that another 4 songs were to be released in his album Z.TAO on August 17, 2015. However, following the 2015 Tianjin explosions in Tianjin, China on August 12, 2015, Tao and his studio decided to reschedule the release date of the album as well as cancel two of the mini concerts planned in China and turn the mini concert in Beijing into a charity concert. On August 19, 2015, the album was released for free.

== Track list ==
No.	Title	Lyrics	Music	Length
1.	"皇冠 (Imperial Crown)"	小寒 (Osamu), Huang Zitao (Rap)	LoveCat	03:28
2.	"Cinderella Girl"	Z.Tao	Huang Zitao, 宫阁 (Palace Court)	03:49
3.	"Feel Awake"	王韵韵 (Wang Yun Yun)	Nick Marsh, Sophie Hintze	02:49
4.	"Alone"	Huang Zitao	Huang Zitao	03:34
Total length:				13:40
