= Hot Blood Dance Crew =

- Promotional poster
- Also known as: Chinese: 热血街舞团
- 热血街舞团
- Genre: Reality-talent show
- Starring: Lu Han; William Chan; Jackson Wang; Victoria Song
- Country of origin: China
- Original language: Chinese
- No. of seasons: 1
- No. of episodes: 12

Production
- Production locations: Beijing, China
- Running time: 94 – 208 Minutes

Original release
- Network: iQiyi
- Release: March 17 – June 2, 2018

Hot Blood Dance Crew (Chinese: 热血街舞团; pinyin: rèxúe jīewú túan) is an original Chinese reality street dance variety show produced by iQiyi. The show was officially aired and broadcast online on March 17, 2018 on iQiyi.

== Concept ==
Hot Blood Dance Crew features 191 dancers from within and beyond China, including individual trainees who aren't associated with any agencies. They compete to be voted the best dancer in China.

== Mentors ==
The mentor teams are Luhan & Jackson and William & Victoria.

Name	Age	Role	Notes
Lu Han	29	Dance mentor	Solo artist/former EXO member (2011-2014)
Jackson Wang	26	Dance mentor	Solo artist/Member of Got7
William Chan	34	Dance mentor	Solo artist
Victoria Song	33	Dance mentor	Solo artist/Member of f(x) (2009-2019)

== Notable contestants ==
- Meng Jia (孟佳)
- Su Lianya (苏恋雅)
- X-Crew Members (AK(阿K), SUTA(秦煜))
- Xiao Jie (肖杰) "Locking Jay"
- Young-G (养鸡)
- Cao Yu (草鱼) "Caster Yu"
- Jun Liu (劉隽) 1Million Dance Studio
- Liu Yuxin (刘雨昕)
- Huang Xiao (Hello Dance)

== Rounds ==
Round 1: Casting The 191 dancers are stationed around the city. The two teams of mentors, Jackson & Luhan and William & Victoria, must go around using a map of where each crew is to cast dancers. Each team only has 30 spots.

Round 2: Ranking Within each team dancers must rank themselves from 1-30. They enter one by one, if someone is sitting in the number spot they want, the two do a freestyle battle for it.

Round 3: 1 v. 1 Battle One by one, starting at number 1, choose an opponent on the same team to do a choreography with. Their team mentor must then eliminate one of them.

Round 4: Group Dance As a team the remaining 15 dancers must choreograph a 3 minute routine, in 48 hours under the concept ‘Brothers’. Before the performance each team must eliminate 3 people. Within this round team leaders ranked their contestants, the losing team must automatically eliminate their last place member.

Round 5: Bottom 3 survival The contestants ranked in the bottom 3 must battle with the other team’s bottom 3. Each member is allowed to choose one person not in the bottom 3 to dance with them, making it a 2 v. 2 battle. The losing member of the bottom 3 must leave. Example; #10 teams up with #2 and they battle #10 and #4 from the other team. If the 10/2 team loses, #10 must leave. The special guests in this round include Galen Hooks and Rie Hata.

Round 6: Singer’s Collaboration Each mentor randomly chooses a number. That number is the number of people that will perform with a singer of the mentor’s choice. The possible numbers are 1, 5, 7 and 8. They perform against the other team and the losing team must eliminate one member. This round is decided by the votes of 99 dancers.

Round 7: Revival The mentors from each team have chosen 3 people from their team that were previously eliminated that they want back. Each revival member gets to choose a current member of their team to represent them in a free-style battle against another revival member’s representative. The winning representative then saves their revival member. This round is decided by the votes of 99 dancers.

Round 7.5: Revival Pt. 2 The surviving revival members must choose a current member from the opposing team to battle against using a prepared choreography. The loser is automatically eliminated, whether they are a current or surviving revival member. This round is decided by the votes of 99 dancers.

Round 8: Subunit Themes Each mentor has chosen a theme, making it 4 themes. Each team must create a subunit to dance to each theme, no subunit can have the same number of members. The themes given are ‘It’s just strong’, ‘Time control’, ‘Pink’ and ‘Butterfly Effect’. This round is decided by the votes of 99 dancers. The total number of votes throughout the 4 rounds are counted. The team with more overall votes win. The losing team must eliminate 3 team members.

Round 9: Iron Man battle One by one members enter into a free-style battle with a member from the opposing team. The loser of the battle is sent to side and another team member takes their place. While the winner of the battle stays to battle the next member, when all teammates from one side have been defeated it’s considered a win for the other team. This round is decided by the votes of 99 dancers.

== International broadcast ==
- Malaysia Astro TV
- iQiYi
- HTV (Vietnam) - Sàn đấu vũ đạo

== Reception ==
Hot Blood Dance Crew was an immense hit in China, receiving over 1.8 billion views on its final episode; topics relating to the show on Chinese microblogging site Sina Weibo also received over 20 billion views. Additionally, as one of the year's most followed and discussed Chinese programs, it broke advertising revenue records across the online entertainment industry.
