= The Brightest Star in the Sky =

- Drama poster
- Genre: Romantic comedy Music
- Written by: Wang Yanta; Zuo Mojia; Liu Ran
- Directed by: Liu Yizhi
- Starring: Huang Zitao; Janice Wu
- Opening theme: "Beggar" by Huang Zitao
- Ending theme: "Once Beautiful" (好不好) by Huang Zitao
- Country of origin: China
- Original language: Mandarin
- No. of seasons: 1
- No. of episodes: 44

Production
- Executive producer: Zhou Hao
- Production locations: China; United States
- Running time: 45 mins
- Production companies: L.TAO Entertainment, Tencent Pictures

Original release
- Network: Tencent, iQiyi, Youku
- Release: March 25 – May 6, 2019

The Brightest Star in the Sky (Chinese: 夜空中最闪亮的星; pinyin: Ye Kong Zhong Zui Shan Liang De Xing) is a 2019 Chinese streaming television series starring Huang Zitao and Janice Wu. It is a coming-of-age story featuring love, friendship, and music, set in the backdrop of the musical industry. It aired on Tencent, iQiyi, and Youku from March 25 to May 6, 2019.

== Synopsis ==
Star Entertainment is the top entertainment agency in China. It was set up by a couple, Cheng Tianhao and Du Wanqing, who eventually separated due to differing beliefs in managing the company. Yang Zhenzhen is an aspiring young girl with a passion for music. She joined Starry Sky Entertainment and was assigned as Zheng Boxu's assistant. Boxu is a popular idol who is arrogant and unruly. With the help of Zhenzhen, who helps him correct his flaws and unleash his potential, Boxu slowly transforms into a talented singer. In the process, Zhenzhen also gains experience and becomes a capable idol manager. At the same time, Du Wanqing is also grooming a singer, Yu Zirui, who shapes up to become Boxu's biggest competitor.

== Cast ==
- Huang Zitao as Zheng Boxu
  - A popular idol singer who is arrogant and unruly. He has a passion for music and a relentless persistence to prove his worth as a singer.
- Janice Wu as Yang Zhenzhen
  - An aspiring artist manager with a love for music.
- Niu Junfeng as Yu Zirui
  - An up-and-coming singer who achieved what he has through hard work and persistence.
- Cao Xiyue as Xia Yuan
  - Zhenzhen's close friend. Yu Zirui's assistant.
- Qin Lan as Fang Yiran
  - Zheng Boxu's older sister.
- Wang Jinsong as Zheng Yajun
  - Zheng Boxu's father.
- Wei Daxun as Wandering singer.
- Emotion Cheung as Gu Ye
  - Owner of a snack shop, which Yang Zhenzhen often frequents he also helped three important people to get where they are now.
- David Chen as Chen Tianhao
  - Founder and CEO of Star Entertainment. Du Wanqing's husband.
- Liu Jia as Du Wanqing
  - Founder and CEO of Star Entertainment. Chen Tianhao's wife.
- Huang Zheng as Chang Ran
  - Music producer and co-founder of Star Entertainment.
- Li Yiling as Yu Hong
  - Artist manager of Star Entertainment.
- Lang Feng as Liu Yinan
  - Promotions manager of Star Entertainment.
- Chen Xi as Sun Yuqi
  - Zheng Boxu's ex-manager. Yu Hong's sister.
- Zhao Yihuan as Ma Lina
  - A new boss who joined the company and Du Wanqing's enemy.
- Guan Yue as Amanda
- Ma Zehan as Zhang Xiaohui
  - Zheng Boxu's Crazy fan.
- Jiang Long as Gu Bin
  - Yu Zirui's close friend.
- Sun Xiaoming as Jason
  - Zheng Boxu's makeup artist.
- Ye Lina as Xiao Jian
  - Zheng Boxu's ex-assistant.
- Yang Zhiying as Ye Kexin
  - She is in love with Zheng Boxu.

== Production ==
The drama was filmed from June 16, 2017 to October 9, 2017. A 4000 square meter set was built from scratch for the drama. The drama was filmed in Beijing, Los Angeles, Ensenada, Baja California, and Cancún .

Huang Zitao acts as the music director of the drama.

== Soundtrack ==
No.	Title	Lyrics	Music	Singers	Length
1.	"Like You So Much (那么喜欢你)"	Wang Yunyun	Daryl K	Zhao Yihuan
2.	"Smile"	Daryl K	Daryl K	Theway Zhang
3.	"Don't Cry"	Wang Yunyun	Daryl K	Theway Zhang
4.	"Oh, Love (爱情啊)"	Wang Yunyun	Daryl K	Theway Zhang
5.	"Need You"	Wang Yunyun, Daryl K	Daryl K, Calvin C	Jiang Yaojia
6.	"Empty (空空)"	Wang Yunyun	Daryl K	Cao Xiyue
7.	"Not Used To It (我不习惯)"	Wang Yunyun	Daryl K	Theway Zhang

Opening Song: Beggar by Huang Zitao

Ending Song: 好不好 by Huang Zitao

Other Songs used in the drama:

Reluctantly (舍不得) by Huang Zitao

Expose (揭穿) by Huang Zitao

Collateral Love by Huang Zitao

Promise by Huang Zitao

== Awards and nominations ==
Award	Category	Nominee	Results	Ref.
Golden Bud - The Fourth Network Film And Television Festival	Best Web Series	The Brightest Star in the Sky	Nominated	
Golden Bud - The Fourth Network Film And Television Festival	Best Actor	Huang Zitao	Nominated	
Golden Bud - The Fourth Network Film And Television Festival	Best Actress	Janice Wu	Nominated	
