= Huang Zitao =

Chinese rapper and singer (born 1993)

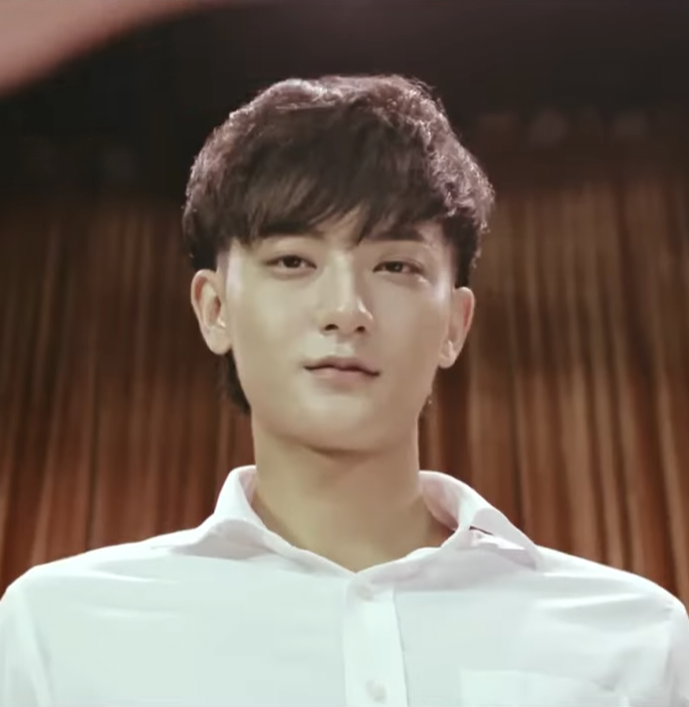
- Huang in 2022
- Born: May 2, 1993 (age 33); Qingdao, Shandong, China
- Other names: Tao, Z.Tao
- Education: Qingdao Foreign Service Vocational School
- Occupations: Rapper; singer; songwriter; businessman; record producer; actor
- Years active: 2011–present
- Spouse: Xu Yiyang (m. 2024)
- Musical career
- Origin: Seoul, South Korea
- Genres: C-pop; K-Pop; R&B; Chinese hip-hop; EDM
- Instrument: Vocals
- Labels: SM; TH; Z.TAO Studio; L.TAO
- Formerly of: Exo; Exo-M; SM Town

Chinese name
- Simplified Chinese: 黄子韬
- Traditional Chinese: 黃子韜
Transcriptions
Standard Mandarin
- Hanyu Pinyin: Huáng Zǐtāo
Yue: Cantonese
- Jyutping: Wong^{4} Zi^{2}-tou^{1}

Signature
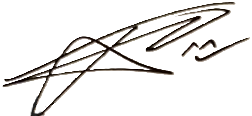

Huang Zitao (Chinese: 黄子韬; pinyin: Huáng Zǐtāo; born May 2, 1993), also known by his stage name Tao (Korean: 타오), is a Chinese rapper, singer, songwriter, record producer and actor. He is a former member of the South Korean-Chinese boy band Exo and its Chinese sub-unit, Exo-M. After leaving Exo, he made his solo debut in China in 2015 with the mini-album TAO, under the stage name Z.Tao. Huang made his acting debut in the romantic movie You Are My Sunshine, followed by TV series Negotiator and The Brightest Star in the Sky.

Huang ranked 25th on Forbes China Celebrity 100 list in 2017, 35th in 2019, and 37th in 2020.

== Early life ==
Huang Zitao was born in Qingdao, Shandong on May 2, 1993. As a child, he undertook Wushu training and became a student athlete. In late 2010 he was scouted by a representative from SM Entertainment at a talent show.

== Music career ==
=== 2011–2015: Exo and lawsuit against SM Entertainment ===
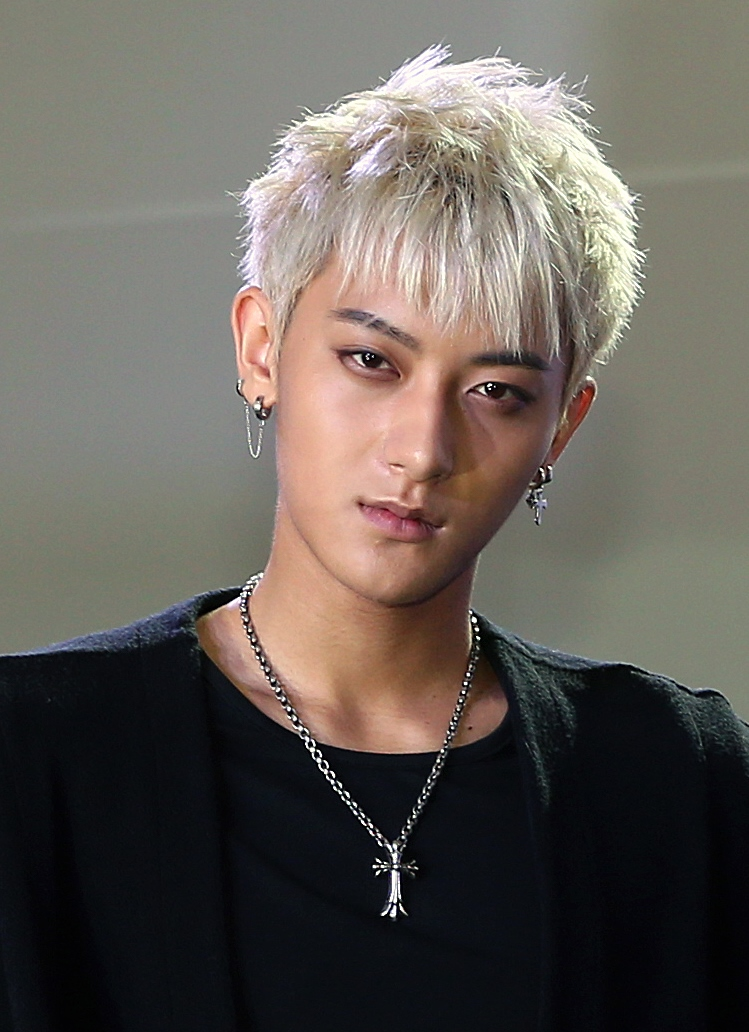
Huang Zitao (Z.TAO) at the Fashion Kode 2014

On December 27, 2011, Huang was formally introduced as the third member of Exo (with the stage name Tao).

In late 2013, Huang took part in filming for MBC's celebrity diving program Splash!, but withdrew due to injuries, and the show was cancelled due to injuries to multiple other contestants.

He featured in two songs from Zhou Mi's album Rewind, which he penned the rap lyrics to; and appeared as a cast member of the Solomon Islands edition of the SBS reality television program Law of the Jungle in 2014. He left the show early due to a foot injury on a coral reef during filming and other scheduled commitments.

In June 2015, Huang set up a Chinese agency, 黄子韬Z.TAO Studio. On August 24, he filed a lawsuit against SM Entertainment to terminate his contract. Huang claimed the 10-year contract had unjust terms and said he lacks freedom due to the long contract period. However, the Supreme Court dismissed Huang's appeal on March 15, 2018. The exclusive contract between SM Entertainment and Huang was considered valid until his contract's conclusion in 2022.

In China, SM Entertainment filed a lawsuit against Huang regarding his solo activities. Chinese courts ruled that Huang was entitled to use his name and image for solo activities in China, and dismissed the lawsuit.

=== 2015–present: Solo career and mainstream popularity ===
On July 23, 2015, Huang made his solo debut with a digital EP titled TAO, which sold 670,000 digital copies in its first week. The album was followed up with a second EP, Z.TAO, which was released for free on August 19 with the title track "Crown". The music video for "Crown" was presented in the style of a 7-minute short film, directed by Nick Lentz and featuring Jessica Gomes. Huang performed the stunts and martial arts sequences for the action scenes in the music video. Huang held his first solo concert Z.TAO Mini Concert at the Beijing Exhibition Center Theater on August 23, as part of a benefit concert for those affected by the Tianjin explosions.

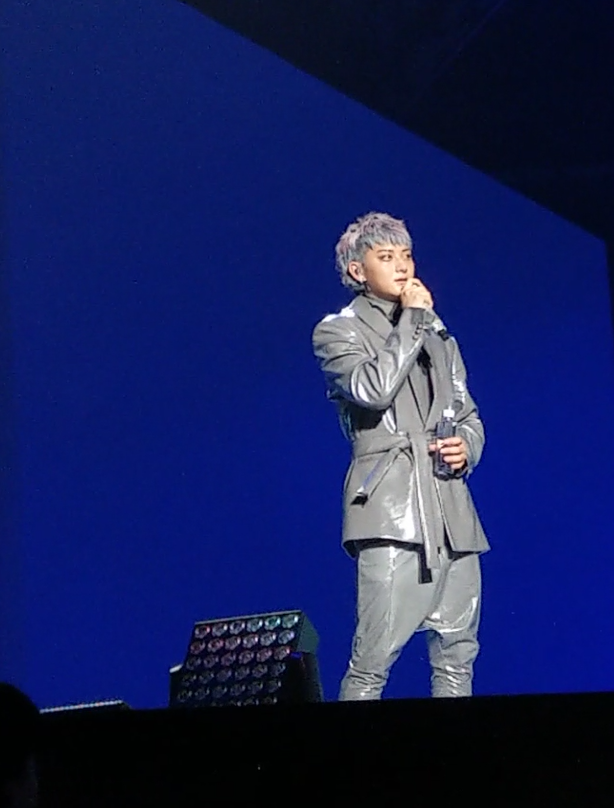
Huang Zitao (Z. Tao) at Is Blue Concert in Shanghai, June 15, 2019

On October 15, Huang released the single "Reluctantly", a ballad composed by himself and Andros Rodriguez. At the 2015 Migu Music Awards, Huang won the "Best Stage Performance" award and performed the single. As part of an endorsement deal with the game I'm the Sovereign, Huang composed and released the single "I'm the Sovereign". The song topped China's Billboard chart for the week of December 5, 2015.

On January 12, 2016, Huang won the "Most Influential Male Singer" award at the 2016 Mobile Video Festival (Miopai Awards). He was later invited to perform as a headliner for the SoYoung 2016 Live Concert Tour on January 29, which featured young rising musicians in China.

Huang's first album The Road was announced in March 2016. It was recorded partly in Los Angeles in collaboration with Nick Lentz. The lead single "The Road" was released on April 22. On May 1, Huang commenced a concert tour Z.Tao The Road Concert for the album in Nanjing and released a music video for the single "Hello, Hello", featuring Wiz Khalifa. Another single, "Adore" was released the same month and sold over 30,000 copies, receiving the platinum certification. The Road was released on August 22 was sold with 8888 pieces limited edition. After one minute of pre-sale opening, the sale profit reached 500k rmb; and the album reached number one on the sale charts. At the end of 2016, Huang won the Most Influential Male Singer award at the Tencent Star Awards.

In April 2017, Huang was named Promotional Ambassador for the 17th Top Chinese Music Awards, where he also won the "All-Round Artist" award. He embarked on his first Asia Tour, Z.Tao Promise Concert Tour which kick-start in Beijing on April 30; and also released a single of the same name.

In 2018, Huang joined the dance-oriented variety show, Street Dance of China. It was also announced that Huang would be the head producer and MC on the Chinese version of Produce 101. The same year, Huang embarked on his fourth concert tour, Z.Tao 2018 IS GOØD Concert Tour.

== Artistry and musical style ==
I'm the Sovereign
"I'm the Sovereign" combines rap, EDM, and Chinese musical instruments.

Following his departure from Exo and return to China, Huang stated that he made a decision to pursue his career in the ailing Chinese music industry, expressing a desire to continue as an artist with the goal of seeing C-Pop receive global recognition. He is involved in songwriting and composition, drawing inspiration from his experiences.

Although he is primarily a rapper, he has also performed Mandopop ballad songs. His music combines elements of hip hop, EDM, and Chinese musical instruments. He cites Jay Chou as his musical inspiration, having listened to his music growing up.

== Acting career ==
Huang made his film debut in romance film You Are My Sunshine alongside Huang Xiaoming and Yang Mi. The film was released on May 1, 2015.

In 2016, Huang starred in the action comedy Railroad Tigers directed by Ding Sheng, alongside Jackie Chan.

In 2017, Huang starred in the martial arts film The Game Changer, directed by Gao Xixi, as well as the romantic thriller Edge of Innocence. The same year, he played the monkey king in the web drama A Chinese Odyssey: Love You A Million Years, adapted from the film A Chinese Odyssey. The series garnered over 5 billion views online during its run. In November, he was announced as one of the two leads in action drama Forward Forever alongside Jackson Yi.

In 2018, Huang starred in Negotiator, a spin-off of the 2016 hit drama The Interpreter. The same year, he was cast in the youth period drama The Files of Teenagers in the Concession.

In 2019, he acted as a Chinese pop star in the music romance youth drama The Brightest Star in the Sky.

== Other activities ==
=== Endorsements and brand ambassadorship ===
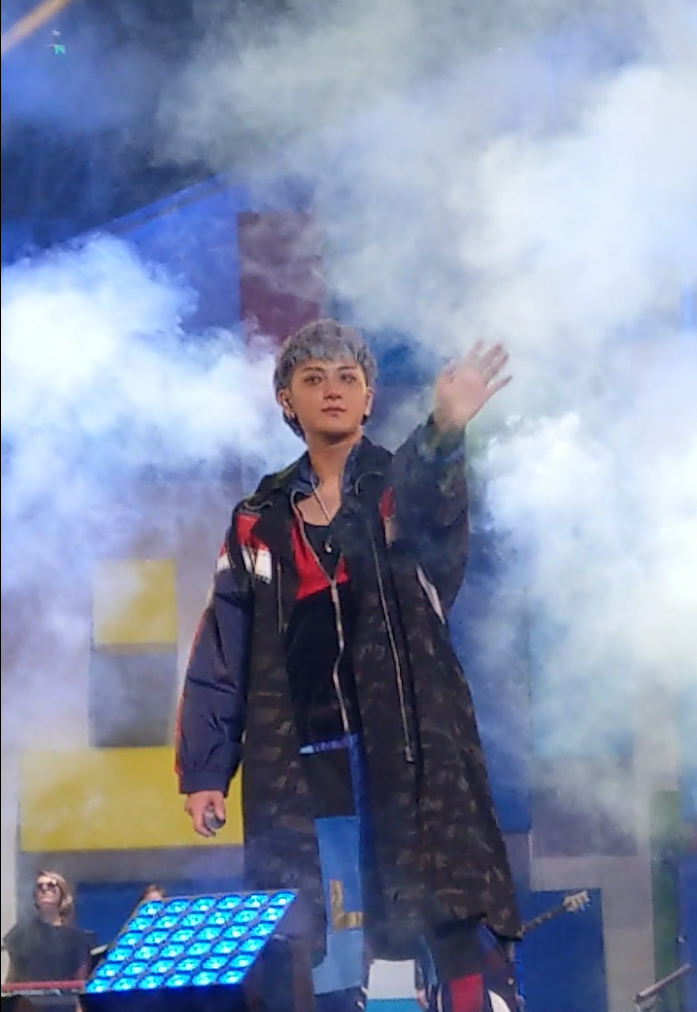
Huang Zitao (Z.Tao) at Is Blue Concert in Shanghai, June 15, 2019

In June 2017, Huang collaborated with Jonathan Anderson, Loewe's creative director, on the "Fire of Youth" campaign, becoming the first Asian artist invited to collaborate with LOEWE.

In July 2017, Hanhoo appointed Huang as their Brand Ambassador. The brand later partially sponsored The Brightest Star in the Sky, a hit drama of Huang with product placement in the drama.

In September 2017, Huang was named Yves Saint Laurent's beauty ambassador and participated in the second season of YSL's web series Before the Light.

Shenwu3, a turn-based MMORPG game by Duoyi Network which is the 4th biggest game company in China, has announced Huang as their brand ambassador. They collaborated further and Huang released a song called "Silently(默默)" under the branding of Shenwu3 in July 2018.

In January 2018, Huang began promoting a China phone brand, Sugar Phone, and attended the press conference for Sugar Phone S11. In April 2018, Sugar Phone supported Huang's IS GOØD Concert Tour as the main sponsor.

Huang has also been appointed as brand ambassador for YSL Eyewars in January 2018.

Jif Jaf Kraft, Tencent Weishi Application and Xiao Zhu home rental application have also appointed Huang as their first brand ambassadors respectively in first half of 2018. In second half of the year, Huang has endorsed KFC, EVISU, Tuborg, Skechers, and Baidu mobile application, as their brand ambassador.

In September 2018, Huang worked on the Chinese version of Stay Open, a promotional song for Tuborg originally released by Diplo and MØ.

Sephora launched their first ad campaign in China with Huang as their brand ambassador in September 2018.

In August 2019, Huang also endorsed Hershey's and Nescafe Dolce Gusto as their brand ambassador. Kappa headlined Huang as their brand ambassador for the campaign "I make my own trend" in the same month.

Lacoste appointed Huang as the company's first brand ambassador for Asia Pacific region and launched "Crocodile Inside" campaign in September 2019. In 2021, Huang cut ties with Lacoste because the company had not issued a global statement affirming that they were not boycotting Xinjiang cotton.

=== Businesses ===
On July 17, 2018, Huang established his own agency called L.TAO Entertainment. Apart from managing Huang's own work, L.TAO has also signed other artists including Xu Yiyang, a former trainee of SM Entertainment.

Huang has expanded his business further by opening a restaurant called "Hao Shi" and an architecture and design company called L.TAO Architecture and Design in June 2019.

==== Domyway ====
In May 2025, Huang launched a brand of sanitary pads called "Domyway" in response to a scandal in China, which found some companies were repackaging defective sanitary pads discarded by well known brands.

According to Huang, Domyway sanitary pads are produced in a factory by fully automated production lines, which can produce up to 1200 pads a minute. The pads feature a QR code on the packaging which consumers can scan to track and view the production process. The first batch of Domyway sanitary pads sold out in 30 minutes.

Initial complaints were made by consumers stating that the sanitary pads contained 'black specks.' Following these complaints Hunag responded in an online statement that "Some protruding fibers were scorched by heat during manufacturing, resulting in black specks" and that according to the "industry's standard tolerance for such imperfections" the pads were safe to use.

=== Z.TAO's Man ===
Z.TAO's Man, a comic and 2D animation character that represents many elements of Huang, was launched in April 2019. Z.TAO's Man is a superhero character whose power is C-pop, the music genre Huang has been promoting and pursuing since the beginning of his solo debut. Huang has collaborated with SunMei Group which is a hospitality business group that owns Thank U hotel chain to create Z.TAO's Man.

Its weekly episodes are released on Sina Weibo's comic platform and a 2D animation is set to release.

== Personal life ==
=== Marriage ===
In May 2020, Huang joined Produce Camp 2020 as a mentor, while Xu Yiyang, an artist signed to his company, participated as a contestant. Shortly after, they sparked dating rumors, though they did not confirm their relationship until July 14, 2024. The couple announced their engagement on August 16 and their marriage on December 2 of the same year.

== Discography ==
- The Road (2016)

== Songwriting ==
Year	Song	Album	Lyrics	Music
2014	"Rewind" (Chinese Version)	Rewind	✓ (with Zhou Mi, Zhou Weijie)	
2014	"Love Tonight"	Rewind	✓ (with Zhou Mi)	
2015	"T.A.O"	T.A.O	✓ (with Chen Hongyu)	✓
2015	"One Heart"	T.A.O	✓ (with Dai Yuedong)	
2015	"Yesterday"	T.A.O	✓	
2015	"M.O.M"	The Road	✓	✓
2015	"Crown (皇冠)"	Z.TAO	✓ (with Osamu)	
2015	"Cinderella Girl"	Z.TAO	✓	✓ (with Palace Court)
2015	"Feel Awake"	Z.TAO		
2015	"Alone"	Z.TAO	✓	✓
2015	"Intro (Vox Up)"	—N/a	✓	✓
2015	"Reluctantly (舍不得)"	The Road	✓	✓
2015	"I'm the Sovereign(我是大主宰)"	The Road	✓ (with Wang Yunyun)	✓ (with Palace Court)
2016	"The Road"	The Road	✓	✓
2016	"Underground King"	The Road	✓	✓
2016	"Hello, Hello"	The Road	✓ (with Daryl K, Kenn Miel, Wiz Khalifa)	
2016	"Adore"	The Road	✓ (with Daryl K, Andie Sandoval)	✓ (with DarylK, Andie Sandoval, Calvin C)
2016	"Mystery Girl"	The Road	✓	✓
2016	"19(十九岁)"	The Road	✓ (with Wang Yunyun)	
2016	"Black White (AB)"	The Road	✓	✓
2017	"New Day"	The Road	✓	✓
2017	"Promise"	—N/a	✓	✓
2017	"Collateral Love"	—N/a	✓	✓
2017	"Uncover(揭穿)"	—N/a	✓	✓
2017	"Still in Time(還來得及)"	—N/a	✓	✓
2017	"You(想成为你)"	—N/a	✓ (with Wang Yunyun)	✓
2018	"Beggar"	—N/a	✓	✓
2018	"Hater"	—N/a	✓	✓
2018	"Misunderstand"	—N/a	✓	✓
2018	"Silently(默默)"	—N/a		✓
2018	"Stay Open"	—N/a	✓	✓
2018	"KOC"	—N/a	✓	✓
2018	"Break Up (分手不分離)"	—N/a	✓	✓
2019	"Single (单身)"	—N/a	✓	✓
2019	"Once Beautiful (好不好)"		✓	✓
2019	"NPNG (不劳不获)"	Art is Blue	✓ (with GAI)	✓ (with GAI)
2019	"One (你也会像我一样)"	Art is Blue	✓	✓
2019	"Fault (错)"	Music is Blue	✓	✓
2019	"AI"	Music is Blue	✓	✓
2019	"The Legendary Man (带风的少年)"			
2019	"The Best of Us (最好的我们)"		✓	✓
2020	"Wish (心愿)"		✓	✓
2020	"Ice Cream (冰激凌)"		✓	✓
2020	"The Happiest Moment (最开心的瞬间)"		✓	✓
2020	"Attack (抨击)"		✓	✓
2020	"Black Card ( 黑卡)"		✓ (with GAI)	✓ (with GAI)
2021	“She and You (她与你)”			
	“Ending (后果)”			

== Filmography ==
=== Film ===
Year	English title	Chinese title	Role	Notes
2015	You Are My Sunshine	何以笙箫默	William	
2016	Railroad Tigers	铁道飞虎	Da Hai	
2017	The Game Changer	游戏规则	Fang Jie	
2017	Edge of Innocence	夏天十九岁的肖像	Kang Qiao	
2022	Moon Man	独行月球	Huang Zitao	

=== Television series ===
Year	English title	Chinese title	Role	Notes
2015	Exo Next Door	—N/a	fictional version of himself	
2017	A Chinese Odyssey: Love You A Million Years	大话西游之爱你一万年	Zhi Zunbao	Web series
2018	Negotiator	谈判官	Xie Xiaofei	
2019	The Brightest Star in the Sky	夜空中最闪亮的星	Zheng Boxu	
2019	Hot Blooded Youth	租界少年热血档案	Wu Qian	
2020	Forward Forever	热血同行	Chong Liming	
2022	Legally Romance	才不要和老板谈恋爱	Lu Xun	
2023	New Vanity Fair	春日暖阳	Song Yang	
2023	Loving You	甜蜜的你	Ke Mi	

=== Variety show ===
Year	English title	Chinese title	Role	Ref.
2015–2016	Charming Daddy	闪亮的爸爸	Cast member	
2016	Law of The Jungle	我们的法则	Cast member	
2016	Takes a Real Man	真正男子汉	Cast member	
2018	Street Dance of China	这就是街舞	Cast member	
2018	Produce 101	创造101	Presenter	
2019	The Protectors	小小的追球	Cast member	
2020	Produce Camp 2020	創造營2020	Mentor	
2020	Rap For Youth	说唱新时代	Rap manager	
2025	Wander Together	宇宙闪烁请注意	Cast member	

=== Music videos ===
Title	Year
"Rewind" Zhou Mi (Feat. ZTao) (Chinese Version)	2014
Zhang Liyin's "Agape" (Feat. with Victoria)	2014
Zhang Liyin's "Not Alone" (Feat. with Victoria)	2014
"Do You Know" (Remake; Jo Sung-mo)	2014
"T.A.O"	2015
"Crown (皇冠)"	2015
"Reluctantly (舍不得)"	2015
"I'm the Sovereign(我是大主宰)"	2015
"The Road"	2016
"Hello Hello" (feat. Wiz Khalifa)	2016
"Black White (AB)"	2016
"Beggar"	2018
"Stay Open" (with Diplo&M∅)	2018
"AI"	2019

== Concerts and tours ==
=== Headliner ===
- Z.Tao Mini Concert Tour (2015)
- Z.Tao The Road Concert (2016)
- Z.Tao Promise Concert Tour (2017)
- Z.Tao 2018 Is GoØd Concert Tour (2018)
- Z.Tao 2019 Is Blue Concert (2019)

== Awards and nominations ==
Year	Award	Category	Nominated work	Result	Ref.
2015	Migu Music Awards	Best Stage Performance	—N/a	Won	
2016	Mobile Video Festival	Most Influential Male Singer	—N/a	Won	
2016	Tencent Video Star Awards	Most Influential Male Singer	—N/a	Won	
2016	Weibo Night Awards	Most Popular Singer	—N/a	Won	
2017	The 5th V Chart Awards	All-Round Artist of the Year	—N/a	Won	
2017	17th Top Chinese Music Awards	All-Round Artist of the Year	—N/a	Won	
2017	Asian Music Gala	Top 10 Songs	"New Day"	Won	
2018	Baidu Baike	All-Round Artist of the Year	—N/a	Won	
2019	China Music Awards	Asian Influential Power Male Singer	—N/a	Won	
2019	China Music Awards	Versatile Artist of the Year	—N/a	Won	
2019	Golden Bud - The Fourth Network Film And Television Festival	Best Actor	The Brightest Star in the Sky, Hot Blooded Youth	Nominated	
2020	The 29th Huading Awards	Best Actor in a Television Series	Hot Blooded Youth	Nominated	
2020	7th The Actors of China Awards	Best Actor (Web series)	Forward Forever	Nominated	
