= Jun Liu =

Malaysian choreographer, singer and dancer

Liu Jun
- 刘隽
- Born: Liu Jun Ying; Seremban, Negeri Sembilan, Malaysia
- Occupations: Singer; Dancer; Choreographer
- Musical career
- Genres: C-pop; Mandopop
- Years active: 2016–present

Liu Jun
- Traditional Chinese: 劉雋
- Simplified Chinese: 刘隽
Transcriptions
Standard Mandarin
- Hanyu Pinyin: Liú Jùn
Yue: Cantonese
- Jyutping: Lau4 Zeon3
Southern Min
- Hokkien POJ: Lâu Chùn

Jun Liu (simplified Chinese: 刘隽; traditional Chinese: 劉雋; pinyin: Liú Jùn; Jyutping: Lau4 Zeon3; Pe̍h-ōe-jī: Lâu Chùn), or Liu Jun, is a Malaysian choreographer, dancer and singer. He has produced dance choreographies for Jackson Yee, GOT7, Rocket Girls 101, Nine Percent. In 2021, he participated in the Chinese male group survival show Youth With You 3, and debuted as a member of IXFORM.

Previously, he was a choreographer under 1MILLION Dance Studio.

== Early life ==
Jun Liu is a local Malaysian Chinese, born and raised in Seremban, Negeri Sembilan, Malaysia. He has an older brother. He started learning dance and Chinese martial arts since he was 7 years old. Jun Liu's father died in early April 2021 whilst he was participating in iQIYI's Chinese male group competition show Youth With You Season 3.

He studied in Chung Hua High School Seremban for his secondary education. He once represented Malaysia National Junior Team and participated in the Asian Junior Wushu Championship, and scored silver in the Changquan category. In 2015, after graduating from secondary school, Liu went abroad to South Korea, intending to further his studies.

== Career ==
In 2016, Jun Liu joined the dance studio 1MILLION Dance Studio in South Korea as a student. He gradually worked his way up, becoming the studio's youngest dance instructor and choreographer. He was also the studio’s first dance instructor of ethnic Chinese descent.

In 2018, Liu headed to mainland China to work in the entertainment industry. In March 2018, he participated in the Chinese street dance competition show Hot Blood Dance Crew, as contestant from William Chan and Victoria Song's team. He also has collaboration stage with Luhan and Jackson Wang.

In July 2019, he served as dance mentor throughout the Chinese boy group Teen in Times (TNT)'s reality show, Typhoon Project. He also served as special mentor in the Taiwanese singing competition show Jungle Voice 2.

In September 2019, he participated with his street dance project teammates in the Chinese dancing competition show Dance Smash, and the team reached Top 16.

In June 2020, he joined as a mentor throughout the Youku's Chinese male group competition show We Are Young. He served as the special dance coach and main dance director for all the trainees.

Throughout these years, he has continued to work as a choreographer and dance instructor, travelling to many dance studios in China to give lessons. He based most of his work in China in recent years whilst still returning to Korea to produce choreography for 1MILLION Dance Studio.

In February 2021, he participated as a trainee in iQIYI's Chinese male group competition show Youth With You Season 3, competing to debut in the 9-member project boy group, where ranking is determined by global viewers' vote. He is the only trainee from Malaysia. He performed an original dance performance in the first performance ranking evaluation, achieving ranking in Class A. The dance mentor of the show, Lisa of Blackpink, praised his performance and stated she had no right to assess him and should instead learn from him. In the theme song "We Rock" assessment, he continued to rank in Class A. He was a popular trainee due his skills as a professional dancer and humble personality. He successfully reached the grand finale.

In July 2021, he officially debuted as a member in the show's project boy group IXFORM. In August 2021, he was chosen to be leader of the group by his fellow group members.

In November 2022, IXFORM has disbanded.

=== Choreography ===
During his term at 1MILLION, Jun Liu has released many dance choreographies which achieved millions of views on YouTube. He has also worked as a dance producer for GOT7's "Lullaby".

Among his dance choreography career, his notable choreographies for Chinese artists and groups include: Jackson Yee's "My Boo"; Typhoon Teens (TYT)'s "Werewolf Boys", "Sister in Love"; Rocket Girls 101's ''Our Shining Time''; Nine Percent's "Let's Dance Together", and others.

He also served as a full-time dance instructor for the TF Entertainment group's Typhoon Teens (TYT) and Teens in Times (TNT).

Liu often shares his original choreographies and covers on social media, including Weibo, Douyin, and Instagram.

== Shows ==
=== Youth With You Season 3 (2021) ===
Types of Stage	Song titles	Teammates	Original singer
First Ranking Evaluation	"Grow Up With High Pressure" (负重一万斤长大)	-	Tai Yi
1st Public Performance (Evaluation Stage)	"New Creature" (新物種)	Kachine, LIN, Krystian, Jiang Jingzuo, Kingston, Layzon	Li Yuchun
Special Stage (Expression Stage)	"Yu" (玉)	Cao Yuxue, X, Ian, Liang Sen, Layzon, Liu Qi, Yuta, Kuma, Johan, J-jin, Jeremy	Tai Yi
Theme Song Stage	"We Rock"	Class A's trainees (Luo Yizhou, Kachine, Jiang Jingzuo, X, Tony, Neil, Lian Huaiwei, Sun Yihang, The Dream, Otter) and all trainees	-
2nd Public Performance (Group Battle)	"History"	Krystian, Jiang Jingzuo, ONE, Otter	EXO-M
Studio Evaluation	"Tou Tou" (偷偷)	Niu Zaizai, DING, Krystian, Nemo	
3rd Public Performance (Theme Evaluation)	"Bamboo" (竹)	Krystian, Jacky, Wang Jiachen, Zheng Xingyuan, Watson, Jerome.D	Original
Mentor Collab Stage	"Kick Back" (秘境)	Lisa (mentor), X, Lian Huaiwei, Neil, Kingston	WayV
Top 20 Fan Meeting Stage	"Bamboo" (竹)	Krystian, Jacky, Luo Yizhou, Watson, Jerome.D	Original
Final Stage Performance	"OZONE" (界)	Xu Ziwei, Liang Sen, Chase Lee, Krystian; Tony, Sun Yihang, Nemo, Rimiko, Lian Huaiwei	Original

=== Variety shows ===
Broadcast date	Network	Titles	Notes
March–June 2018	iQIYI	Hot Blood Dance Crew	Contestant
July–October 2018	Hunan Television	PhantaCity	Choreographer
July 2017	ETtoday	Jungle Voice 2	Dance Special Mentor
September–December 2019	Hunan Television	Dance Smash Season 1	Contestant
June–August 2020	Youku	We Are Young	Special Dance Coach, Dance Director
July 2020	Tencent	Super Nova Games Season 3	Contestant
18 February 2021 – 1 May 2021	iQIYI	Youth With You Season 3	Contestant
