= Edge of Innocence =

- Movie Poster
- Traditional Chinese: 夏天19岁的肖像
- Simplified Chinese: 夏天19岁的肖像
- Hanyu Pinyin: Xiàtiān Shíjiǔ Suì De Xiàoxiàng
- Directed by: Chang Jung-Chi
- Written by: Soji Shimada
- Based on: Summer Portrait of a 19 year old by Soji Shimada
- Produced by: Desen International Media
- Starring: Huang Zitao; Yang Caiyu
- Release date: May 27, 2017
- Country: China
- Language: Mandarin

Edge of Innocence (Chinese: 夏天十九岁的肖像; pinyin: Xiàtiān Shíjiǔ Suì De Xiàoxiàng, literally "Summer, The Portrait of a 19 Year Old") is a 2017 Chinese mystery thriller film directed by Chang Jung-Chi and starring Huang Zitao and Yang Caiyu. The film is based on the novel Summer, The Portrait of a 19 Year Old, written by Japanese mystery writer Soji Shimada.

The story revolves around Kang Qiao and his obsession with a mysterious woman. The film was scheduled for release in China in August 2016 but was delayed to May 27, 2017.

== Plot ==
After getting injured in a motorcycle accident, Kang Qiao is sent to the hospital. He is accompanied by his close friends Zhu Li and Zhao Yi, who try to cheer him up. Zhu Li is the daughter of the hospital owner and secretly likes Kang Qiao. One day, he looks out the hospital window and notices a young woman. He is enticed by her beauty, and falls in love with this mysterious woman while recovering from his injury. Yet one night, he sees her stabbing an old man, presumably her father. She and her mother drag the body and buried it into an abandoned area near the hospital. Kang Qiao witnesses this incident, but decides to keep quiet because of his crush.

One day, Kang Qiao receives a threat advising him not to investigate the incident. Kang Qiao realizes that someone might be spying on him, and that the mysterious woman might be in danger. He decides to follow her, even trespassing into her house. He desperately looks for evidence on who the spy is, but leaves after finding her in the shower. The next day, Kang Qiao receives a phone message from a mysterious phone number, cautioning him not to stalk her. He is alarmed, but is determined to help her stay safe. Kang Qiao finds out that her name is Xia Yingying, and she works at a big company.

To approach Xia Yingying, he becomes her client and they go out for dinner together. He offers to send her home, but accidentally reveals that he knows where she lives. Xia Yingying becomes suspicious, and Kang Qiao reveals that he was spying on her during his stay at the hospital. They embrace each other and she accepts his feelings. She tells him that her family is strict, and to be careful. After Kang Qiao and Xia Yingying spend a day together, Kang Qiao is pursued by a group of men. They are looking for Xia Yingying and are sent by her mother. Kang Qiao is beaten very hard, but he refuses to tell them about Xia Yingying's whereabouts.

Kang Qiao returns to the hospital, where he finds out that the place where Xia Yingying's father was buried has been dug. He is alarmed and rushes inside the hospital to find Xia Yingying. Kang Qiao witnesses Zhu Li attempting to give Xia Yingying poisoned water. Zhu Li tells him that she is madly in love with him and she installed a camera in his hospital room. She also admits that she was the one trying to harm Xia Yingying. Zhao Yi also reveals himself as Zhu Li's accomplice, because Zhao Yi was in love with Zhu Li. Zhao Yi was the one who dug the supposed body of Xia Yingying's father, but there was nothing there except for a pile of infant supplies. The police soon arrives and arrests Zhu Li for her actions. Xia Yingying is taken away by her mother, but Kang Qiao chases after them on his motorcycle.

Kang Qiao eventually confronts Xia Yingying, and she decides to tell him the truth. Her father was still alive, and he wasn't her father, but actually her husband. She married him to repay her mother's debts, but never told anybody about their relationship. Xia Yingying became pregnant with his child, but the infant soon died after birth. She got into an argument with her husband, and her mother told her to make him a cup of tea. She was using a knife to cut tea leaves when her father suddenly had a heart attack. She tried to save him, which made it seem like she stabbed him. Xia Yingying had buried the infant's supplies into the abandoned area near the hospital, which was witnessed by Kang Qiao.

Ten years later, Xia Yingying is determined to leave the old man, but hesitates after her husband is set up by his business partners. She didn't want him to face any struggles and decided to stay. Her husband also had cancer, and Xia Yingying accompanied him throughout chemo and lawsuits. The old man soon passes away and Xia Yingying leaves. She reunite with Kang Qiao, and they wish to spend another summer together.

== Cast ==
- Huang Zitao as Kang Qiao
- Yang Caiyu as Xia Yingying
- Li Meng as Zhu Li
- Du Tian Hao as Zhao Yi

== Controversy ==
Before the release of the movie in theatres, Ann An, CEO and founder of Desen International Media Co., Ltd, lamented the lack of screening time for "Edge of Innocence" at its release during the Dragon Boat festival national holiday.

The movie received only 5.83% of the screen nationwide and other domestic movies released during that time were also allocated similar amount of screening time, while foreign movies like "Pirates of the Caribbean" received 57.3% of screening time. Ann An advised "The gap is so huge, and Chinese films will surely die if this continues. Please give a survival chance and space for domestic films and don't let them die at the starting line!"

== Reception ==
The film grossed CN¥ 5.3 million (US$780,162) on its opening weekend. It has grossed CN¥ 9.1 million in China.
