= T.A.O (EP) =

EP by Z.Tao
- Released: July 23, 2015
- Genre: Dance
- Language: Mandarin
- Label: Huang Z.TAO Studio

Z.Tao chronology
T.A.O (2015)	Z.TAO (2015)

Singles from T.A.O
- 1. "T.A.O" Released: July 23, 2015

T.A.O is the first EP of the Chinese rapper and singer Z.Tao, released on July 23, 2015 by Huang Z.TAO Studio.

== Background and release ==
In June 2015, it was reported that Tao had set up his own personal management agency in China to manage his solo activities, entitled Huang Z.TAO Studio. Tao revealed a mysterious teaser image through its official account on Weibo on July 9. It was revealed on July 13 that Tao officially launch their first mini-album.

The mini-album was released in China on July 23, 2015 where it sold over 670 000 within its first week.

== Track listing ==
No.	Title	Lyrics	Music	Length
1.	"T.A.O"	陈宏宇 (Chen Hong-Yu), Huang Zitao	Taylor Parks, Huang Zitao, Kenn Miel, Oliver Smith, Daryl K.	03:20
2.	"One Heart"	代岳东 (Generation Dong Yue), Daryl K., Huang Zitao (Rap)	Daryl K., Calvin C	03:33
3.	"Yesterday"	王韵韵 (Wang Yun Yun), Huang Zitao (Rap)	宫阁 (Palace Court)	04:26
Total length:				11:19

== Sales ==
Region	Sales
China	746,522+
