= Revenged Love =

- 逆愛
- Genre: Boys' love; Comedy; Drama; Romance
- Based on: Counter Attack (逆袭) by Chai Ji Dan (柴鸡蛋)
- Directed by: Gong Yu Shi
- Starring: Zi Yu; Tian Xu Ning; Zhan Xuan; Liu Xuan Cheng
- Country of origin: China
- Original language: Mandarin
- No. of seasons: 1
- No. of episodes: 24

Production
- Running time: 42 minutes
- Production companies: Vision Light Media Co., Ltd.

Original release
- Release: June 16 – August 12, 2025

Related
- Falling in Love with a Rival (2015)

Revenged Love (Chinese: 逆爱) is a 2025 Chinese BL television drama starring Zi Yu, Tian Xu Ning, Zhan Xuan, and Liu Xuan Cheng. Adapted from the web novel Counter Attack (逆袭) by Chai Ji Dan (柴鸡蛋), the series is a remake of Falling in Love with a Rival (2015). It was also highlighted in Brazilian and international media for its unexpected romantic storyline and global popularity.

== Plot ==
Born into a humble family with little financial prosperity, Wu Suo Wei (Zi Yu) is constantly insulted by his much wealthier ex-girlfriend. Determined to reinvent himself, he starts his own business but crosses paths with Chi Cheng (Tian Xu Ning), the spoiled heir of a family enterprise. When Suo Wei discovers that his ex is dating Chi Cheng, he decides to take revenge—by seducing Chi Cheng himself. Despite never having had romantic inclinations toward men, Suo Wei commits fully to his plan and successfully wins Chi Cheng's heart, only to be surprised by his own genuine feelings. As their lives intertwine more deeply, Suo Wei faces increasing complications. Will this unexpected love story succeed, or has his revenge plan gone too far?

== Production ==
The story is set in an unspecified city in China and in the respective suburbs. Aerial shots appear to show the skyline of Wuhan.

== Cast ==
=== Main ===
- Zi Yu as Wu Qi Qiong/Wu Suo Wei
- Tian Xu Ning as Chi Cheng
- Zhan Xuan as Guo Cheng Yu
- Liu Xuan Cheng as Jiang Xiao Shuai

=== Recurring ===
- Liu Jun as Wang Shuo
- Wang Yu Qiao as Wang Zhen
- Sun Qian Yu as Yue Yue
- Zhao Ming Chuan as Li Gang/"Gang Zi"
- Birgit as Meng Tao, Xiao Shuai's ex-boyfriend
- Qin Yue as Zhang Li Ya, Suo Wei's mother
- Cheng Shi Yu as Chi Yuan Duan, Chi Cheng's father
- Jiang Rong as Zhong Wen Yu, Chi Cheng's mother

=== Guest ===
- Zhou Yao as Wang Zhen Long, Yue Yue's new boyfriend
