= Produce Pandas =

Chinese boy group

熊猫堂ProducePandas
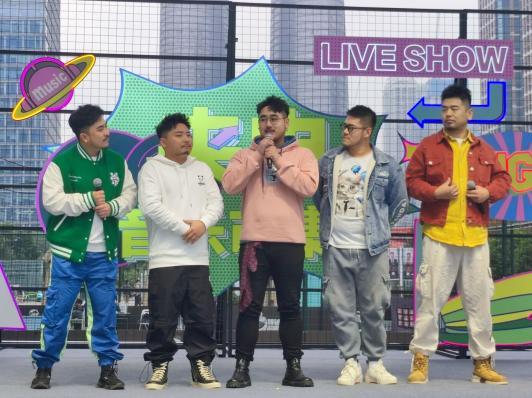
- ProducePandas at MiGu Music in October 2021; From left to right: Cass, Otter, DING, Husky and Mr. 17

Background information
- Also known as: ProducePandas
- Origin: Beijing, China
- Genres: C-pop; Mandopop
- Years active: 2020-present
- Label: DMDF Entertainment | Simply Joy Music
- Members: DING; Otter; Husky; Mr.17; Cass; Luu

Produce Pandas (Chinese: 熊猫堂; pinyin: Xíong Māo Táng; fully stylized as 熊猫堂 ProducePandas) is a Chinese boy group dubbed as "China's first plus-size boy band" formed and managed by DMDF Entertainment, which was set up under Simply Joy Music to specifically manage plus-sized groups. The group currently consists of six members: Chen Dingding (DING), Cui Yunfeng (Otter), Qi Ha (Husky), Shi Qijun (Mr. 17), Ka Si (Cass), and Lulu (Luu). They made their debut on July 28, 2020, with their single "La La La".

== Background ==
The idea for Produce Pandas came in 2018 when their parent label Simply Joy Music decided to form a boy group that breaks the "aesthetic stereotypes" perpetuated by the idol industry in an effort to create role models who are ordinary and relatable to their fans. The management noticed that idol groups in the market tend to have a lot of similarities in terms of physical build, style and temperament. This gives form to the stereotype that all idols have to be thin, young and fair-skinned. Produce Pandas aim to become idols centered around being more "rotund and approachable" instead of the cool and handsome demeanor sported by boy groups.

== History ==
=== Formation and pre-debut activities ===
Scouts and notices were sent out to recruit plus-sized men, and out of the approximate 300 candidates who auditioned, 5 were picked for the final lineup after months of testing and eliminations in the form of weekly, monthly and quarterly assessments.

The chosen members came from various backgrounds and gave up their jobs, ranging from Amazon customer service to petroleum refinery worker to start their full-time training for Produce Pandas, with their oldest member being 30 years old at the time of joining.

While three of the members have experience in singing, only one came from a dancing background. The group underwent intense "K-pop style" training in order to match the industry standards in terms of performance skills.

=== 2020: Debut album A.S.I.A, first concert ===
After their initial debut, they followed up with three more songs and then released their first album A.S.I.A on 15 October. It is their only album to have a music video for each song. It was originally intended to have the videos filmed at various places all over Asia, but due to the COVID-19 outbreak, many of the videos were filmed back in Beijing. The music video for Sui Sui Nian (碎碎念) was filmed in Bali, Indonesia.

On November 22, Produce Pandas held a concert in Chengdu.

On December 18, the group announced their fandom name (Panda Keeper), official group colour #FF0000 and individual members' official colours on a Weibo post.

=== 2021: Youth with You, Stand Up EP, second album Emo了, national tour ===
Produce Pandas competed on the third season of Chinese reality show Youth with You, where Ding and Otter managed to pass the first elimination before finishing at 52 and 42 respectively.

Shortly after the show on May 13, Produce Pandas released their single and music video "Dream".

Produce Pandas announced their first EP Stand Up, which was released on May 28 along with a music video for the title track two days later.

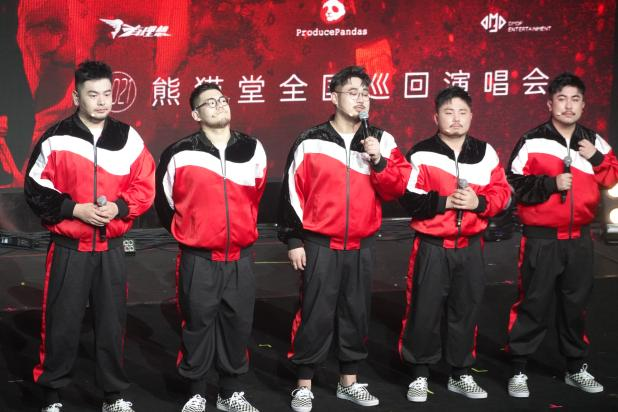
ProducePandas national tour in Shanghai, October 2021

On July 28, Produce Pandas released a single "The ONE" for their one year anniversary, which came in a Chinese version and a Japanese version with a music video for both tracks, as well as their second concert on July 30 which featured their debut performance of "The ONE", in Beijing.

In September, their company teased the title track of their second studio album, to be revealed on September 28 as "Free Fall", with a music video following two days later. The album, Emo了, was announced to be released on October 15, featuring six new tracks and four selected tracks. Another track of the album, "Victims", received two music videos centered around self-harm (Non suicidal self injury) to raise awareness on issues of mental health and self-harm. A national tour was also announced with the album release, scheduled for Shanghai, Chengdu and Guangzhou, on 24 October, 30 October and 18 December, respectively. The Chengdu concert was initially postponed to 20 November, then cancelled altogether as a precaution due to a resurgence of COVID-19 cases in the area.

Produce Pandas performed on 23 October in The Night of Unlimited Power live concert along "Real Me · 动感地带 2021来电之夜" with other artists like Chris Lee and Mao BuYi.

=== 2022: Singles Best of You, Cosmic Anthem and second Extended Play Love Best Before ===
Produce Pandas released their second single Best of You (冲刺) on April 6.

On May 20, Produce Pandas took part in the 2022 Bilibili Dancing Festival by performing a vocal and dance cover of the official theme song Heartbeat Spectrum The credits of that song hinted at a new member by the title of "Panda Trainee" as part of the backing vocals in the cover.

During their livestream on May 29, Produce Pandas announced that they are releasing a new song on the 31st of May, revealed to be part of their second extended play Love Best Before, which would contain a mix of solo and group tracks. The five solo tracks were dropped over the span of three weeks until the official release of the full EP on June 21. The EP includes a solo track by the Panda Trainee, who was initially rumored to join the line up which lead to backlash from fans. Ray Xi, the group's agent, made an announcement regarding speculations of the alleged sixth member. The trainee, whose identity remains undisclosed, is said to be part of Produce Panda's "Panda Trainee system" where he will serve as a substitute member in the event of long term absence of a panda (such as from health issues or solo activities) for commercial events while still receiving support for long term development from the company.

TEAM Entertainment, Produce Panda's japanese label, announced a single to be released on August 31. The single's lead track includes Cosmic Anthem, sung in both chinese and japanese versions, as well as 手紙 Tegami (transl. "Letter"), a japanese version of their A.S.I.A song You Raise Me Up.

== Members ==
Members	Native Name	Role	Date of birth	Place of birth	Color	Emoji	Previous Job
DING / Chen Dingding	陈鼎鼎	Group Leader	August 16, 1994 (age 32)	Wuhan, Hubei	#ECC7CD	🐷	Plus-size model
Otter / Cui Yunfeng	崔云峰	Main Vocals	March 9, 1998 (age 28)	Panjin, Liaoning	#FFFFFF	🍚	Amazon customer service
Husky / Qi Ha	七哈	Lead Vocals	February 5, 1995 (age 31)	Haicheng, Liaoning	#69B3E7	🐳	Project manager IT
Mr. 17 / Shi Qi Jun	十七君	Main Dancer	November 1, 1989 (age 36)	Yangzhou, Jiangsu	#FFA94D	🍊	Oil worker
Cass / Ka Si	卡斯	Lead Vocals	May 27, 1991 (age 35)	Lianyungang, Jiangsu	#43D62C	🌵	Pub singer
Luu	鲁鲁	TBA	August 24, 1995 (age 31)	Shandong	#9B00B6	🔮	Financial Management

== Discography ==
=== Studio albums ===
Title	Album details
A.S.I.A	Released: October 15, 2020; Label: DMDF; Formats: Digital download, streaming; Track listing: 1. La La La 辣辣辣; 2. Renascence 千转; 3. Sui Sui Nian 碎碎念; 4. Fortune Cat (ft. G-Tracy) 招财猫; 5. Pan Ta 盘他; 6. The Paramount Show 荒诞秀; 7. You Raise Me Up 长大; 8. How Do You Do 好肚有肚; 9. Na Na Na; 10. Indigo
Emo了	Released: October 15, 2021; Label: DMDF; Formats: CD, Digital download, streaming; Track listing: 1. Free Fall 就算与全世界为敌也要跟你在一起; 2. Happy? 满意; 3. Bubble Gum 口香糖; 4. New Horse; 5. Suuuuuper Mario; 6. Victims 不例外; 7. The ONE (Chinese Version); 8. The ONE (Japanese Version); 9. The World of Foodie Masters 饕餮人间; 10. Dream (ft. Ji Cui Xi) 以梦为马 (壮志骄阳版); 11. Happy? (DJheap） 满意 （九天版 Remix)
W.O.R.L.D.	Released: July 14, 2023; Labels: DMDF; Formats: CD, Digital download, streaming; Track Listing: 1. Rua Ta Ta 320万年前; 2. Entelecheia 隐德来希; 3. Kongming 孔明; 4. Koi Fish Bu Lu Lu 锦鲤卟噜噜; 5. A Deer or a Horse 指鹿为马; 6. Falling For You 热带季风 (Facevoid Remix); 7. California Rverie 加州梦境; 8. Asymptotic Freedom 渐近自由; 9. Wherever We Go 世界所有的烂漫

=== Extended plays ===
Title	Album details
Stand UP 《大惊小怪》	Released: May 27, 2021; Label: DMDF; Formats: CD, Digital download, streaming; Track Listing: 1. Stand Up 大惊小怪; 2. Tool-Man 工具人; 3. Dream 以梦为马; 4. Dream (Piano version) 以梦为马
Love Best Before《爱的赏味期限》	Released: June 21, 2022; Label: DMDF; Formats: Digital download, streaming; Track Listing: 1. Di Da Di 滴答滴 ft. 糯米Nomi and ￥oungLord-张旻轩; 2. Falling for You 热带季风; 3. Trash 渣 4. Irreplaceable 独特; 5. After the Rain 雨后; 6. Then 然后然后; 7. Quit 丢 8. Falling for You 热带季风 (FACEVOID桃心臉哥 Remix）

=== Singles ===
Title	Album details
COSMIC ANTHEM/手紙	Released: August 31, 2022; Labels: DMDF Entertainment, TEAM Entertainment Inc.; Formats: CD, Digital download, streaming; Track Listing: 1. COSMIC ANTHEM - Japanese Version; 2. 手紙 - 長大 You Raise Me Up Japanese Version; 3. COSMIC ANTHEM - Chinese Version
山海 -Promise-	Released: August 29, 2024; Labels: DMDF Entertainment, TEAM Entertainment Inc.; Formats: CD, Digital download, streaming; Track Listing: 1. 山海 -Promise- (Japanese ver.); 2. 山海 (Promise); 3. Timing (Black Biscuits cover); 4. 山海 -Promise- (Instrumental)

=== Promotional Singles ===
Title	Year	Album
The Great Dream / 伟大的梦想	2020	Non-album single
The World of Foodie Masters / 饕餮人间	2020	Emo了
The ONE	2021	Emo了
Dream / 以梦为马	2021	Stand Up
Qi Bu Long Dong Qiang / 七步隆咚呛	2021	Non-album single
The Meaning of Being Together / 在一起的意义	2021	Non-album single
A Vision of Eternity / 一眼万年	2021	Non-album single
Best of You / 冲刺	2022	Non-album single
COSMIC ANTHEM/手紙	2022	Non-album single
Good Night World / 世界晚安	2022	Non-album single
Next Year Go Go Go / 明年也要好好长大	2022	Non-album single
320 萬年傳 Rua Ta Ta	2023	W.O.R.L.D.
Wherever We Go / 世界所有的爛漫	2023	W.O.R.L.D.
山海 -Promise-	2024	Non-album single
怪梦 Fantasy	2024	Non-album single

=== TV Appearance ===
Broadcast time	Channel	Name of the program	Member Participated
2020
14 September	CCTV-15	Music On the Cloud / 云端音乐季	Group
25 December	HuNan TV	Sing or Spin Season 2 / 嗨唱转起来	Group
25 December	Shenzhen TV	Poetic China / 诗意中国	Group
25 December	CCTV-1	Star Boulevard / 星光大道	Group
2021
3 January	CCTV-3	I Want To Be In Spring Festival Gala / 我要上春晚	Group
27 June	GuangDong TV	Great Experience / 见多识广	Group
26 July	CCTV-3	SuperStar Ding Dong/ 开门大吉	Group
23 August	CCTV-3	SuperStar Ding Dong/ 开门大吉	Group
25/26 September	Shenzhen TV	Boom Happy Valley / 夏日冲击波	DING/Cass
2022
30 January	CCTV-4	Universal Show / 环球综艺秀	Group
15 February	CCTV-15	Television Gramophone / 影视留声机	Otter
4 May	CCTV-15	China Beat / 中国节拍	Group
27 May	CCTV-15	China Beat / 中国节拍	Group
31 May / 7 June	CCTV-3	Happiness / 向幸福出发	Group
8 June	CCTV-15	Television Gramophone / 影视留声机	Otter
19 August	CCTV-15	China Beat / 中国节拍	Group
26 September	CCTV-3	SuperStar Ding Dong/ 开门大吉	Group
24 October	CCTV-3	SuperStar Ding Dong/ 开门大吉	Group
31 October	CCTV-3	SuperStar Ding Dong/ 开门大吉	Group
12 November	CCTV-4	Universal Show / 环球综艺秀	Group
12 November	CCTV-1	Star Boulevard / 星光大道	Group
20 November	CCTV-3	SuperStar Ding Dong/ 开门大吉	Group
28 November	CCTV-3	SuperStar Ding Dong/ 开门大吉	Group

== Filmography ==
=== Web dramas ===
Year	Name	Member	Role	Notes	Streaming Platform
2022	Campus Ace 王牌校草	Husky	Wang Tongqing 王同庆	Supporting role	WeTV 腾讯视频
2022	My little chef 厨妻当道	Cass	Zhan Yunxi 詹云熙	Supporting role	WeTV 腾讯视频

=== Group Variety Show ===
Year	Name	Streaming Platform
2022	Pop up！Pandas！熊猫出没请注意	WeTV 腾讯视频

== Awards ==
DouYin Discover Music Project/抖音看见音乐计划
Year	Category	Result
2021	Discover Happiness Musician Award/看见美好音乐人奖	Won

Chinese Top Ten Music Awards/东方风云榜
Year	Category	Result
2022	Eastern New Artist/ 东方新人奖	Won

== Concert and tours ==
- Produce Pandas A.S.I.A first time singing concert "熊猫堂ProducePandas A.S.I.A 感恩首唱会" - 2020
- We are The One Produce Pandas debut 1st anniversary concert "We are The One 熊猫堂一周年演唱会" - 2021
- Produce Pandas EMO了 National concert tour "熊猫堂 EMO了 全国巡回演唱会" - 2021
  - Shanghai
  - Guangzhou
