= Ziyou =

Ziyou (Wade–Giles: Tzu-yu) may refer to:

- Ran Qiu, courtesy name Ziyou (子有)
- Yan Yan (disciple of Confucius), courtesy name Ziyou (子游) E

== See also ==
- Ziyu (disambiguation), or Tzu-yü
