= Ziyu =

Ziyu (Wade–Giles: Tzu-yü) may refer to:

- Cheng Dechen (died 632 BC), courtesy name Ziyu (子玉), general of Chu
- Zengzi (505–435 BC), courtesy name Ziyu (子輿), disciple of Confucius
- Tantai Mieming (born 512 BC), courtesy name Ziyu (子羽), disciple of Confucius
- Ziyu (Han Clan), head of the House of Han
- Zhou Ziyu, retired general of the People's Liberation Army Air Force
- Tzuyu or Chou Tzu-yu (born 1999), Taiwanese singer, dancer, and member of South Korean girl group Twice
- Zi Yu (born 2002), Chinese singer and actor

== See also ==
- Ziyou (disambiguation)
