= Zi Yu (entertainer) =

Chinese singer and actor

- Born: Zheng Peng; July 6, 2002 (age 24); Lianyungang, Jiangsu, China
- Occupations: Singer; actor
- Years active: 2020–present
- Agents: Zi Yu Studio; Ruihe
- Height: 182 cm (5 ft 11 1/2 in)
- Musical career
- Genre: Mandopop
- Instrument: Vocals
- Labels: Ruihe Entertainment; Zi Yu Studio Huakaibanxia Culture Media (former)
- Formerly of: Guanghe Shaonian

Chinese name
- Simplified Chinese: 梓渝
- Hanyu Pinyin: Zǐ Yú

Zheng Peng (Chinese: 郑朋; born July 6, 2002), known professionally as Zi Yu (Chinese: 梓渝), is a Chinese singer and actor. He made his first public appearance on the Chinese idol survival program, We Are Young (2020), followed by Youth With You 3 (2021). He later made his debut under Huakaibanxia Culture as a member of Guanghe Shaonian, and would leave the group and agency in 2023.

Zi Yu gained widespread recognition for his lead role in the web novel-adapted drama series, Revenged Love (2025).

== Early life ==
Zi Yu was born Zheng Peng on July 6, 2002, in Lianyungang, Jiangsu, China, where he spent the first years of his life. In early 2020, he was scouted online and moved to Beijing to pursue a career in the entertainment industry.

== Career ==
=== 2020–2021: We Are Young and Youth With You 3 ===
In June 2020, Zi participated in the male group reality competition show, We Are Young, representing Huakaibanxia Culture as a trainee. He failed to debut in the final group, being eliminated at 33rd place.

In January 2021, he participated in the iQIYI-produced boy group competition reality show Youth With You 3 alongside four other trainees from Huakaibanxia Culture. He ranked 22nd in the first elimination, 21st in the second, and was ultimately eliminated at 31st place during the third, missing his chance to debut again. Although none sent by Huakaibanxia Culture made it into the final group, Zi finished with the highest ranking among these trainees.

=== 2021–2023: Guanghe Boys and departure ===
Shortly after Youth With You 3, he debuted on June 25, 2021, as center in the C-Pop idol boy group Guanghe Shaonian (Chinese: 光合少年) managed by Huakaibanxia Culture. They made their debut with their first mini album, New Light. The group never managed to achieve widespread popularity, their most successful hit being their final single, "Shake That," which was released on January 13, 2022.

Along with his musical career, Zi Yu started his acting debut in the TV series《將軍在下》, which began filming on August 25, 2022. He portrayed the character Xiao Jun.

In December 2022, it was reported that Zi was bullied by Guanghe Shaonian leader Zheng Xingyuan during a group schedule. Huakaibanxia Culture denied these allegations, claiming they were false rumors. On January 9, 2023, Zi Yu issued a statement on his personal Weibo account that confirmed he was beaten by his then-teammate Zheng Xingyuan during a group rehearsal on the evening of December 8, 2022. In his statement, he claimed the company did not handle the incident in a justly manner and filed for contract termination on December 31. Huakaibanxia Culture refused to communicate, and the two parties failed to reach a consensus; subsequently, Zi decided to take direct legal action. Following his departure from the group, the band quietly dissolved shortly after.

Zi was eventually able to terminate his exclusive artist contract. Since he filed for early termination, he was obligated to pay a penalty fee of RMB 600'000 for breach of contract.

=== 2024–present: Film roles and career relaunch ===
Following his departure from his previous company, Zi appeared in various short format dramas such as Why Did Secretary Duan Behave Like That? and The Tyrant's Reluctant Consort.

On June 16, 2025, the television series Revenged Love premiered, in which Zi portrayed the protagonist Wu Suowei. It marked his first main role in a full-length web series, and brought him greater public attention from people in China and internationally. He went on to perform at twelve music festivals, take part in multiple brand ambassadorships, and embarked on his first concert tour.

The Ruihe YouTube Channel launched on April 29, 2026, with an announcement of releasing his Jisuxiaoyu Concert Tour 2026 First Phase Documentary. The Zi Yu Studio YouTube Channel launched on June 21, 2026, accumulating over 5,200 subscribers within hours of opening.

On May 6, 2026, he topped the Pioneer Group in TME Chart's 30 Under 30 "Top Young Singers" selection, earning recognition as one of the leading young Chinese artist in the market.

On August 20, 2026 interview by New Beijing News about the making of his song "Run It" was released. It covers topics such as his soon to be released self titled album "Ziyu", his personal growth from leaving his hometown for Beijing at 17 to holding his own concert tour at the age of 23.

== Media appearances ==
On May 23, 2026, Zi was invited to perform at China Film Association Event at Xi'an. On May 29, Zi appeared on the cover of Cosmopolitan China. The limited edition of 100,000 copies sold out within two seconds, generating ¥5.5 million in sales, according to official reports.

=== Commercial performances ===
Brand Ambassadorships
Brand	Date	Details
Vita Young	September 2025	—
Yaya	October 2025	—
Funcinating	November 2025	
Baidu	November 2025	
Netease	December 2025	
Kiehls	December 2025	
uSmile	January 2026	
Serova	January 2026	
Charlotte Tilbury	March 2026	
WuGuMoFang	June 2026	
Funcinating Gismow	August 2026	
Nivea	September 2026	
uTree	September 2026	

== Philanthropy ==
=== 2025 ===
In May, Zi participated in the Light and Health Public Welfare Tour, which supported rural education and hearing-impaired children.

In September, he was appointed as the Ear Care Project Love Ambassador for the China Hearing Medical Development Foundation, donating a total of 200,000 yuan to support the hearing-impaired community, and released the charity theme song "Hengxing" ("Stellar") to raise awareness. The same year, he visited rehabilitation centers for hearing-impaired children, where he interacted with special education teachers and the children, including activities like drawing, puzzles, and playing together. Additionally, he donated a "Little Fish Love Library" to Sanjiang Central School in Rongjiang County, Guizhou, benefiting all 524 students (including 328 boarding students) and filling the gap in reading resources for the school.

He served as an "aesthetic education star promoter" for the After-Class One Hour public welfare project, teaming up with Bazaar Charity, WeCharité, and FUNCINATING to support the donation and transformation of Aesthetic Education Classrooms for rural children.

In late 2025, following a major fire in Hong Kong's Taipo Hongfu Court, Zi donated 500,000 yuan through the China Social Assistance Foundation to support fire victims and their families in rebuilding their homes. He also canceled scheduled offline activities to allow the public to focus on disaster relief efforts.

=== 2026 ===
Ziyu continued his charitable work through multiple channels. He remained active in the Light and Health Public Welfare Tour, supporting hearing-impaired children and rural education through donations. He also continued direct community outreach by visiting nursing homes, helping elderly residents with daily tasks, and engaging with their lives.

On 29 August 2026, Ziyu released his debut self-titled studio album, Ziyu, comprising ten tracks. The album ranked first on QQ Music’s full-year album.

== Discography ==
Album

Title	Year	Peak chart positions
"Ziyu" (梓渝)	2026	1

=== Singles ===
Title	Year	Peak chart positions	Album
Title	Year	CHN	Album
"How Are You Doing" (你过得还好吗)	2024	—	Non-album singles
"Kiss me, and?"	2025	78	Non-album singles
"Call Me"	2025	—	Non-album singles
"Me, Embracing You" (擁抱你的我)	2025	—	Non-album singles
"Firefly Planet" (螢火星球)	2025	—	Non-album singles
"Quagmire" (泥潭)	2025	1	Non-album singles
"Terminator Line" (晨昏線)	2025	—	Non-album singles
"Too Deep"	2025	1	Non-album singles
"I Can" (我可以)	2025	4	Non-album singles
"Her Path, Our Light" (她的路，我们的光)	2025	19	Non-album singles
"Stellar" (恒星)	2025	2	Non-album singles
"Say I Love You Before Sunrise" (趁黎明来临前说爱吧)	2025	1	Non-album singles
"Next Page" (下一頁)	2025	—	Non-album singles
"Sunny Day After Rain" (雨后晴天)	2025	1	Non-album singles
"Deep Sea Wandering Guide" (深海漫游指南)	2025	1	Non-album singles
"Unwavering" (不渝)	2025	1	Non-album singles
"Hometown's Moon" (故乡月)	2026	1	Non-album singles
"Romance In The Rain" (情深深雨濛濛)	2026	1	Non-album singles
"Beyond The Peak" (凌绝顶)	2026	1	Non-album singles
"Cosmic Universe" (宇宙游乐场)	2026	1	Non-album singles
"A Fish Swimming Ashore" (游向陆地的鱼)	2026	1	Ziyu
"Twenty Four" (贰拾肆)	2026	1	Ziyu
"Run It"	2026	1	Ziyu
"—" denotes a recording that did not chart or was not released in that territory

Soundtrack appearances

Title	Year	Peak chart positions	Album
Title	Year	CHN	Album
"Blooming Freely" (肆意生花)	2025	12	Revenged Love OST

== Filmography ==
=== Web series ===
Year	Title		Role	Notes	Ref.
Year	English	Chinese	Role	Notes	Ref.
2024	Why Did Secretary Duan Behave Like That?	段秘书为何那样呢	Duan Jingze		
2025	Jing Zhong Mo Sheng Ren	镜中陌生人	Li Yunting		
2025	Finding You	雾散时吻你	Shen Bufan		
2025	Just Wanna Be With You	三嫁魔君			
2025	Revenged Love	逆爱	Wu Suowei / Wu Qiqiong		
2025	The Tyrant's Reluctant Consort	朕的妙妃是暴君	Tushan Jin		
2025	Jing Cheng Zhi Deng Dai Yi Chang Li Bie Xue	京城之等待一场离别雪	Wu Chengxi	Guest appearance	
2025	Qian Tu Wu Liang! Wo Jiao Gong Zi Kai Yin Hang	钱途无量！我教公司开银行	Fu Tingxu		

=== Television ===
Year	Title		Role	Network	Ref.
Year	English	Chinese	Role	Network	Ref.
2023	My Lady General	将军在下	Xiao Ban / Prince Yue / 10th Prince	Tencent Video	

=== Video games ===
Year	Title		Role	Ref.
Year	English	Chinese	Role	Ref.
2025	Road to Empress	女王的游戏：盛世天下	Bianji	

== Live performances ==
Music Festivals	City	Date
Galaxy Left Bank Music Festival	Yancheng	July 20, 2025
Galaxy Left Bank Music Festival	Guiyang	August 2, 2025
Jump Park Music Festival	Qingdao	August 17, 2025
Mango Music Festival	Tianjin	September 20, 2025
Galaxy Left Bank Music Festival	Ezhou	September 21, 2025
Taihu Bay Music Festival	Changzhou	October 2,2025
Taihu Bay Music Festival	Changzhou	October 4, 2025
Galaxy Left Bank Music Festival	Luzhou	October 5, 2025
Galaxy Left Bank Music Festival	Ganzhou	October 25, 2025
Galaxy Left Bank Music Festival	Putian	November 8, 2025
Weibo Big Eye Music Festival	Nanjing	November 9, 2025
Oxygen Music Festival	Hangzhou	November 16, 2025

Concert Tours	Date	City	Venue	Ref.
You Dian Yi Si Concert Tour 2026	December 19, 2025	Nanjing	Nanjing Youth Olympic Sports Park	
You Dian Yi Si Concert Tour 2026	December 20, 2025	Nanjing	Nanjing Youth Olympic Sports Park	
You Dian Yi Si Concert Tour 2026	December 31, 2025	Guiyang	Guiyang International Convention & Exhibition Center	
You Dian Yi Si Concert Tour 2026	January 1, 2026	Guiyang	Guiyang International Convention & Exhibition Center	
You Dian Yi Si Concert Tour 2026	January 16, 2026	Wuhan	Optics Valley International Tennis Centre	
You Dian Yi Si Concert Tour 2026	January 17, 2026	Wuhan	Optics Valley International Tennis Centre	
You Dian Yi Si Concert Tour 2026	January 18, 2026	Wuhan	Optics Valley International Tennis Centre	
You Dian Yi Si Concert Tour 2026	January 30, 2026	Xiamen	Xiamen Olympic Sports Center-Phoenix Gymnasium	
You Dian Yi Si Concert Tour 2026	January 31, 2026	Xiamen	Xiamen Olympic Sports Center-Phoenix Gymnasium	
You Dian Yi Si Concert Tour 2026	February 1, 2026	Xiamen	Xiamen Olympic Sports Center-Phoenix Gymnasium	
