= Youth With You season 3 =

2021 Chinese boy group competition show

Youth With You
- Season 3
- Promotional poster, with the mentors
- Starring: Li Yuchun; Li Ronghao; Lisa; Will Pan

Release
- Original network: iQIYI
- Original release: February 18 – May 1, 2021

Season chronology
- ← Previous; Season 2

Youth With You 3 (Chinese: 青春有你3; pinyin: QīngChūnYǒuNǐ 3) is a 2021 Chinese male group survival show by iQIYI. The third season features 119 trainees from different entertainment agencies, to form a 9-member male group through global viewers' votes. The group IXFORM debuted on 25 July 2021.

The show is the third season of the Youth With You series. This season was presented by Li Yuchun, with Lisa, Li Ronghao, and Will Pan serving as mentors. It aired from February 18, to May 1, 2021, on iQIYI every Thursday and Saturday at 7:00 pm CST, with subtitles available in several languages.

The grand finale, originally scheduled to be streamed live on May 8, 2021, was cancelled and the show was terminated after an order from the Chinese media government bureau, due to the show's milk-wasting controversies.

On 25 July 2021, two months after the termination, it was announced that group IXFORM debuted with top 9 members, Luo Yizhou, Jojo Tang Jiuzhou, Lian Huaiwei, Neil Liu Guanyou, Jerome Deng Xiaoci, Kachine Sun Yinghao, Liu Jun, X Duan Xingxing, Sun Yihang.

== Concept ==
In its third season Youth With You brings 119 trainees together who are either from entertainment agencies or are not signed under any company. 9 trainees will be selected through viewers' votes to form a boy group after weeks of evaluations, group performances, and eliminations.

== Mentor ==
- Li Yuchun — Youth PD
- Li Ronghao — Vocal mentor
- Lisa — Dance mentor
- Will Pan — Rap mentor
- Esther Yu – Youth tutor

=== X Mentors ===
- G.E.M.
- Silence Wang

== Contestants ==
Color key

- Top 9 of the week
- Left the show
- Eliminated in Episode 10
- Eliminated in Episode 16
- Eliminated in Episode 20
- Eliminated in Episode 23
- Final members of IXFORM

Company	Name	Age	Judges Evaluation (Note: The trainees are ranked in four classes: A, B, C or N (Newbie).)		Rankings												
Company	Name	Age	1	2	E02	E04	E06	E10		E12	E16		E20		E23		Final
Company	Name	Age	1	2	#	#	#	#	Votes	#	#	Votes	#	Votes	#	Votes	Final
Independent Trainees	Liu Jun (刘隽)^{1}	28	A	A	7	9	8	8	7,763,643	8	9	8,808,048	12	3,574,126			
Independent Trainees	Huang Hongming / Alan (黄泓铭)	29	N	N	43	53	56	37	1,586,857	24	34	4,534,665	32	Eliminated			32
Independent Trainees	Gong Yixing / Owen (龚毅星)	27	N	C	40	49	51	47	1,159,201	28	39	Eliminated					39
RADiANT PiCTURES (光芒影业)	Yan Xi / Liam (彦希)^{13, 29}	30	C	C	13	18	22	20	2,759,818	20	31	4,853,210	28	Eliminated			28
DngD (咚那个咚)	Chen Zilong (陈子龙)	30	N	N	103	114	113	Eliminated									64 - 118
Original Stone Music (原石音乐)	Wu Yue / May (武悦)	26	C	C	109	101	108	Eliminated									64 - 118
Astro Music (星宇愔乐)	Yu Jingtian / Tony (余景天)^{4} ^{29}	23	A	A	2	1	1	1	19,486,372	1	1	19,504,390	1	13,559,007	Left the show		
avex China (爱贝克思)	Xu Ziwei (徐子未)	29	A	C	93	25	15	13	4,206,613	29	17	6,968,144	17	3,377,588			
B.K. Entertainment (彬稞娱乐)	Bai Lu (白陆)^{30}	28	B	C	65	82	60	55	984,809	34	36	3,879,158	Eliminated				36
B/G ENTERTAINMENT (黑金计划)	Wang Nanjun / Krystian (王南钧)^{12, 14, 20}	26	B	B	36	24	25	24	2,306,340	26	25	6,192,866	20	3,258,319			
B/G ENTERTAINMENT (黑金计划)	Li Qin / Kin (李钦)^{14}	29	C	N	60	42	43	45	1,256,374	14	24	6,254,348	35	Eliminated			35
B/G ENTERTAINMENT (黑金计划)	Li Shuo / Joker (李硕)^{14}	28	C	N	80	69	88	Eliminated									64 - 118
B/G ENTERTAINMENT (黑金计划)	Ying Chenxi / Layzon (应晨熙)^{14}	24	C	B	47	56	81	Eliminated									64 - 118
Banana Entertainment (香蕉娱乐)	Jiang Jingzuo (姜京佐)^{3, 23}	28	C	A	8	13	14	17	3,572,457	23	19	6,829,571	22	2,955,138	Eliminated		22
Banana Entertainment (香蕉娱乐)	Zhao Jinyao / S.Titch (赵瑾尧)	26	N	B	67	66	65	43	1,277,683	58	59	Eliminated					59
BF Entertainment (大脸娱乐)	Wei Hongyu (魏宏宇)	27	A	N	84	4	4	6	11,865,745	32	37	3,779,751	Eliminated				37
ChengMengWenHua (程梦文化)	Ke Er / Cole (柯尔)^{24}	29	N	N	118	48	58	46	1,179,272	41	44	Eliminated					44
Chenfan Entertainment (宸帆娱乐)	Zhong Fulin / Jony (钟福林)	25	N	N	91	71	59	Eliminated									64 - 118
Beijing Chunyin Culture Media Co., Ltd. (刍音文化)	Zhang Siyuan / G.G (张思源)^{10}	31	B	C	24	17	19	19	2,782,709	40	18	6,868,656	23	2,879,159	Eliminated		23
CIWEN MEDIA (慈文影视)	Deng Zeming / Jeremy (邓泽鸣)^{5, 11}	23	B	B	15	20	20	21	2,704,956	19	23	6,265,579	24	Eliminated			24
D.WANG MEDIA (大王娱乐)	Cao Yuxue (曹宇雪)	28	C	C	116	102	115	Eliminated									64 - 118
D.WANG MEDIA (大王娱乐)	Li Tianqi (李天琪)^{6}	30	B	B	89	103	112	Eliminated									64 - 118
D.WANG MEDIA (大王娱乐)	Li Zichen / Lion Lee (李子晨)^{7, 27}	28	C	C	110	116	117	Eliminated									64 - 118
D.WANG MEDIA (大王娱乐)	Zhao Mingxuan (赵明轩)	26	C	C	112	115	118	Eliminated									64 - 118
DMDF (大美德丰)	Ka Si / Cass (卡斯)^{18}	35	C	B	31	45	57	Eliminated									64 - 118
DMDF (大美德丰)	Chen Dingding / DING (陈鼎鼎)^{18}	31	C	C	18	28	37	49	1,115,283	52	52	Eliminated					52
DMDF (大美德丰)	Qi Ha / Husky (七哈)^{18}	31	C	B	26	33	47	Eliminated									64 - 118
DMDF (大美德丰)	Shi Qijun / MR.17 (十七君)^{18}	36	C	C	30	41	53	Eliminated									64 - 118
DMDF (大美德丰)	Cui Yunfeng / Otter (崔云峰)^{18}	28	C	A	25	34	44	54	996,506	42	42	Eliminated					42
Emperor (Beijing) Culture Development Co., Ltd. (英皇娱乐)	Yu Yanlong (余衍隆)	26	C	C	50	67	82	Eliminated									64 - 118
FancyTown Culture (范堂文化)	Wang Jiachen (汪佳辰)	26	B	C	63	60	45	27	1,959,790	17	30	4,916,834	27	Eliminated			27
Gramarie Entertainment (果然娱乐)	Hu Xuanhao / SoNeX (胡轩豪)	27	N	B	108	110	101	Eliminated									64 - 118
HAOHAN Entertainment (浩瀚娱乐)	Liu Guanyou / Neil (刘冠佑)^{31}	24	B	A	44	83	85	32	1,836,217	12	13	8,385,629	6	4,325,637			
HAOHAN Entertainment (浩瀚娱乐)	Chang Huasen / Waston (常华森)	28	N	N	11	15	17	16	3,580,551	9	10	8,788,404	10	3,655,594			
HAOHAN Entertainment (浩瀚娱乐)	Liu Junhao / Kaiden (刘俊昊)	27	N	N	42	58	68	48	1,120,631	45	45	Eliminated					45
HAOHAN Entertainment (浩瀚娱乐)	Li Tianyi (李添翼)	25	N	N	104	118	73	Eliminated									64 - 118
HAOHAN Entertainment (浩瀚娱乐)	Zhang Shuaibo (张帅博)	23	N	C	71	95	100	Eliminated									64 - 118
HAOHAN Entertainment (浩瀚娱乐)	Bao Han / Kepler (包涵)	23	N	N	49	89	104	Eliminated									64 - 118
HEDGEHOG BROTHERS (刺猬兄弟)	Wang Haoxuan / WD (王浩轩)^{10}	26	C	C	27	21	26	35	1,727,882	50	49	Eliminated					49
Beijing Lan Mei Tailor Made Production Culture (海西星生)	Han Jingde / Hans (韩竞德)	24	N	N	56	35	41	50	1,055,870	55	55	Eliminated					55
Hot Idol (好好榜样)	Chen Yugeng / Crayon (陈誉庚)	28	N	B	32	36	33	28	1,913,094	30	20	6,791,387	21	3,180,609	Eliminated		21
HKBX Entertainment (花开半夏文化传媒)	Zi Yu (梓渝)^{8}	24	C	C	20	27	28	22	2,618,042	18	21	6,572,007	31	Eliminated			31
HKBX Entertainment (花开半夏文化传媒)	Zheng Xingyuan (郑星源)	25	B	B	23	31	34	31	1,867,200	22	27	5,237,392	34	Eliminated			34
HKBX Entertainment (花开半夏文化传媒)	Han Ruize (韩瑞泽)	25	C	N	94	88	75	58	941,419	60	60	Eliminated					60
HKBX Entertainment (花开半夏文化传媒)	Li Mingxu (黎明旭)	25	C	C	55	63	74	56	955,851	57	57	Eliminated					57
HKBX Entertainment (花开半夏文化传媒)	Wan Yuchen / Yuchoen (万禹辰)	25	C	B	72	72	63	44	1,259,659	43	41	Eliminated					41
HUAYI BROTHERS FASHION (华谊兄弟时尚)	Wei Xingcheng / Vic Wei (魏星丞)^{17}	27	N	C	75	70	77	26	2,190,641	39	40	Eliminated					40
JS Entertainment (集笙文化)	Xiao He / River (小河)	28	N	N	90	44	48	Eliminated									64 - 118
JH Entertainment (瑾和娱乐)	Ayu (阿煜)	32	C	N	28	30	24	33	1,816,188	51	51	Eliminated					51
Kss (快享星合)	Aierfajin / Alpha (爱尔法·金)^{15}	26	N	N	39	59	72	Eliminated									64 - 118
Kss (快享星合)	Wang Zi’ao / Hussein (王梓澳)^{8, 15, 16}	25	N	Left the show													
Kss (快享星合)	Fu Xueyan / Fu (付雪岩)^{15}	28	C	N	88	79	79	Eliminated									64 - 118
Kss (快享星合)	Zhou Junyu / Neil (周峻宇)^{15}	28	N	C	57	80	96	Eliminated									64 - 118
LT. ENTERTAINMENT (龙韬娱乐)	Zhong Junyi / ONE (钟骏一)	23	C	B	62	37	39	57	949,708	54	54	Eliminated					54
LaoyuVision (老鱼映画)	Sun Yinghao / Kachine (孙滢皓)	26	A	A	29	12	11	11	5,577,701	6	6	10,002,859	5	4,748,308			
Ling You Jing Ji (领优经纪)	IKELILI (艾克里里)	31	B	B	9	14	18	23	2,436,653	49	50	Eliminated					50
LIANHUAIWEI STUDIO (连淮伟工作室)	Lian Huaiwei (连淮伟)^{5}	28	C	A	4	6	6	3	13,167,230	3	4	12,537,143	3	5,718,259			
Live Nation	Yang Boni / Bernie (杨泊尼)^{28}	33	N	C	114	104	111	Eliminated									64 - 118
Live Nation	Yang Yuehan / Johan (杨约翰)^{28}	30	B	C	115	92	98	Eliminated									64 - 118
M-NATION (辰星娱乐)	Duan Xingxing / X (段星星)	28	A	A	95	23	21	18	3,246,841	10	7	9,627,172	8	3,994,735			
MANTRA PICTURES (工夫真言)	Shi An (时安)	25	N	N	101	113	116	Eliminated									64 - 118
Mavericks Entertainment (麦锐娱乐)	Cao Yu / BoogieFish (草鱼)	35	C	B	38	39	38	38	1,562,793	31	33	4,631,728	29	Eliminated			29
Mavericks Entertainment (麦锐娱乐)	Zhou Zijie (周子杰)	28	C	C	83	55	46	41	1,351,205	56	58	Eliminated					58
summerstar (盛夏星空)	Cao Zijun / Dream (曹子俊)^{26}	23	N	C	34	51	61	Eliminated									64 - 118
Shanghai ZUI Co., Ltd. (最世文化)	He Derui (何德瑞)	28	N	C	68	98	35	25	2,215,470	15	16	7,089,700	18	3,275,178			
MOUNTAINTOP (泰洋川禾)	Yang Haojun / Lucas (杨皓钧)	24	N	N	74	96	106	Eliminated									64 - 118
M+ ENTERTAINMENT (木加互娱)	Chen Junhao / Drcchen (陈俊豪)^{8}	26	N	C	10	11	13	15	3,704,346	33	32	4,710,917	25	Eliminated			25
firefly (萦火丛传媒)	Xu Xinchi / Nemo (徐新驰)	24	N	C	17	16	12	12	4,892,320	16	14	7,712,046	16	3,384,772			
NUCLEAR FIRE MEDIA (火核传媒)	Xiong Yiwen / Kuma (熊艺文)^{6, 22}	29	B	C	66	85	67	62	849,427	Eliminated							62
NUCLEAR FIRE MEDIA (火核传媒)	Zhan Zhan / J-jin (湛展)^{21}	30	C	C	106	117	109	Eliminated									64 - 118
NUCLEAR FIRE MEDIA (火核传媒)	Liu Fenglei / Leo (刘峰磊)	26	N	N	86	105	86	Eliminated									64 - 118
Original Plan (原际画)	Sun Yihang (孙亦航)^{2}	24	B	A	5	7	7	7	8,477,428	4	3	13,112,284	7	4,215,269			
Original Plan (原际画)	Yang Yangyang (杨阳洋)	24	N	C	33	50	71	Eliminated									64 - 118
Qin's Entertainment (坤音娱乐)	Liu Xin / LilStar (刘欣)^{19}	24	N	B	52	78	94	61	902,540	Eliminated							61
Qin's Entertainment (坤音娱乐)	Yang Tao / TAOO (杨淘)^{6, 19}	28	N	N	45	57	76	Eliminated									64 - 118
Qin's Entertainment (坤音娱乐)	Lin Yiming / LIN (麟壹铭)^{6, 19}	29	C	N	78	74	80	Eliminated									64 - 118
Qin's Entertainment (坤音娱乐)	Feng Chen Sinan / Merman (冯陈思楠)^{19}	26	B	B	82	75	89	63	844,862	Eliminated							63
Qin's Entertainment (坤音娱乐)	Ma Sihan / SAI (马思涵)^{19}	31	C	C	64	73	78	Eliminated									64 - 118
RE MEDIA (冉翼文化)	Deng Xiaoci / Jerome.D (邓孝慈)	27	N	N	12	8	9	9	5,794,392	38	29	4,938,338	11	3,586,144			
R-Star (锐策娱乐)	Qiu Danfeng / Chuk (邱丹枫)	25	N	C	16	22	23	29	1,908,941	37	35	4,323,440	33	Eliminated			33
SY MUSIC & ENTERTAINMENT Co., Ltd. (韶愔音乐娱乐)	Chen Xuanxiao (陈泫孝)	31	N	N	73	81	95	Eliminated									64 - 118
SHENGSHIGUANGNIAN (盛世光年)	Yang Haoming (杨昊铭)^{9, 25}	26	B	B	21	26	27	34	1,801,582	36	28	4,975,631	19	3,265,976			
SHOWCITYTIMES (少城时代)	Tang Jiaqi / Andy (唐嘉齐)	28	B	B	105	62	49	Eliminated									64 - 118
SHOWCITYTIMES (少城时代)	Bai Ding / Dow (白丁)	25	B	N	70	40	32	39	1,535,907	48	48	Eliminated					48
SHOWCITYTIMES (少城时代)	Chen Junyu / Jaydon (陈俊宇)	27	B	B	58	52	40	53	1,023,334	44	38	3,534,955	Eliminated				38
SHOWCITYTIMES (少城时代)	Xuan Hao / Swen (宣淏)	28	C	C	102	77	62	Eliminated									64 - 118
SJ. (庶吉影视)	Xu Zhuolun / Casper (许卓伦)	25	C	C	77	61	50	52	1,027,740	53	53	Eliminated					53
Beijing simply joy culture development Co., Ltd. (简单快乐)	Ailizati (艾力扎提)	23	C	C	54	47	55	59	940,993	35	43	Eliminated					43
Beijing simply joy culture development Co., Ltd. (简单快乐)	Li Yuan / Russell (李远)	27	N	N	79	94	97	Eliminated									64 - 118
Sony Music Labels Inc. (日本索尼音乐)	Yuta Hashimoto / Yuta (桥本裕太)	31	C	B	53	43	42	51	1,038,409	27	22	6,273,772	26	Eliminated			26
Guang Pu Yu Le (光谱娱乐)	Xu Bin (徐滨)	25	N	N	81	64	92	Eliminated									64 - 118
STAR MASTER (匠星娱乐)	Ke’er Lijun / Keerlijun (苛尔力钧)^{9}	31	B	B	87	93	36	40	1,357,317	46	46	Eliminated					46
STAR MASTER (匠星娱乐)	Mu Sen / Tim (木森)^{7}	31	C	C	85	87	93	Eliminated									64 - 118
STAR MASTER (匠星娱乐)	Shi Shang (时尚)	27	B	B	111	106	103	Eliminated									64 - 118
STAR MASTER (匠星娱乐)	Zhe Ye / Ken (哲野)^{7}	31	B	B	100	108	90	Eliminated									64 - 118
STF	Cai Feiyang (蔡飞扬)	25	C	C	59	97	107	Eliminated									64 - 118
STF	Huang Jianxi / Ebon (黄鉴曦)	27	C	C	69	99	110	Eliminated									64 - 118
STF	Fang Zheng (方政)	25	C	B	113	112	83	Eliminated									64 - 118
STF	Wang Linkai / Jason. K (王琳凯)^{8}	25	C	B	41	65	69	60	922,394	59	56	Eliminated					56
STF	Yang Zhixiang / The Dream (杨智翔)	26	B	A	117	90	91	Eliminated									64 - 118
Super Idol (超级爱豆)	Huang He / River. (黄河)^{17}	25	C	B	96	100	84	Eliminated									64 - 118
Super Idol (超级爱豆)	Li Haolin / Tommy (李昊霖)	26	C	B	92	111	87	Eliminated									64 - 118
TAOXIUGUANGYING (淘秀光影)	Niu Zaizai (牛在在)	28	N	N	22	29	30	42	1,282,077	47	47	Eliminated					47
HESONG ENTERTAINMENT	Shi Qi / Chase Lee (十七)	24	B	C	14	10	10	10	5,784,055	25	15	7,172,450	9	3,808,876			
TIANMAXINGHE (天马星河)	Du Tianyu / Jacky (杜天宇)	23	N	C	61	46	29	36	1,689,609	21	26	5,527,283	13	3,548,949			
Times Fengjun Entertainment (时代峰峻)	Li Junhao / Rimiko (李俊濠)	28	C	B	1	2	2	4	12,576,105	11	11	8,486,765	15	3,385,082			
Beijing Why Entertainment Co., Ltd. (未禾娱乐)	Zhong Zhuorong / Jeremy (钟卓融)	23	C	N	99	91	99	Eliminated									64 - 118
YG ENTERTAINMENT BEIJING LIMITED (曜星文化)	Yi Xuan / KINGSTON (亿轩)	27	C	C	46	38	31	30	1,875,578	13	12	8,428,171	30	Eliminated			30
YG ENTERTAINMENT BEIJING LIMITED (曜星文化)	Chen Jinxin / JAYDEN (陈金鑫)	27	B	B	76	86	102	Eliminated									64 - 118
GAOYIBAI STUDIO (翼百影视文化)	Gao Yibai / Hosky (高一百)	29	N	N	19	32	54	Eliminated									64 - 118
YC (一澄娱乐)	Liang Hongli / Evaldo (梁弘立)	27	N	N	37	84	64	Eliminated									64 - 118
TheYoung Entertainment (德漾娱乐)	Liang Sen (梁森)	28	A	B	6	3	3	2	13,748,557	7	8	9,358,521	14	3,447,402			
Beijing Youhug Media Co., Ltd. (耀客传媒)	Luo Yizhou (罗一舟)	26	A	A	48	19	16	14	3,766,773	2	2	18,347,358	2	10,637,905			
Beijing Youhug Media Co., Ltd. (耀客传媒)	Chen Jianyu / DeDe (陈建宇)	27	C	C	35	54	66	Eliminated									64 - 118
Beijing Youhug Media Co., Ltd. (耀客传媒)	Jiang Zhihao / Ian (蒋智豪)^{6}	30	C	C	98	107	114	Eliminated									64 - 118
Beijing Youhug Media Co., Ltd. (耀客传媒)	Kong Xiangchi / KK (孔祥池)	28	C	C	107	109	105	Eliminated									64 - 118
YI HUA ENTERTAINMENT (壹华娱乐)	Tang Jiuzhou / JOJO (唐九洲)	28	N	N	3	5	5	5	11,930,095	5	5	11,129,769	4	5,318,850			
YI HUA ENTERTAINMENT (壹华娱乐)	Liu Qi (刘琦)	29	C	C	97	76	52	Eliminated									64 - 118
YI HUA ENTERTAINMENT (壹华娱乐)	Zhang Jingyun (张景昀)	25	C	C	51	68	70	Eliminated									64 - 118

=== Contestant Notes ===
1. : Choreographer of 1MILLION Dance Studio
2. : Member of Yi An Musical (易安音乐社)
3. : Former contestant on Idol Producer
4. : Former contestant on Produce X 101
5. : Former contestant on Youth With You
6. : Former contestant on Produce Camp 2019
7. : Former contestant on All For One
8. : Former contestant on We Are Young
9. : Former contestant on The Next Top Bang
10. : Former contestant on The Rap of China
11. : Former contestant on The Coming One 2
12. : Former contestant on Super Boy
13. : Former trainee at SM Entertainment
14. : Member of BGCode
15. : Member of Jup1ter
16. : Member of ALIBI
17. : Former trainee of YG Entertainment
18. : Member of Produce Pandas
19. : Member of BC221
20. : Member of Now United
21. : Member of LIMITLESS
22. : Member of D7BOYS
23. : Member of TANGRAM
24. : Member of JULY LAB
25. : Member of All In
26. : Member of Midsummer Cubs
27. : Former member of CNK
28. : Member of BEAUZ
29. : Former trainee of FNC Entertainment
30. : Former trainee of DSP Media
31. : Former trainee of TOP Media

=== Top 9 ===
Color key

New Top 9

#	Episode 2	Episode 4	Episode 6	Episode 10	Episode 12	Episode 16	Episode 20	Episode 23
1	Li Junhao / Rimiko (李俊濠)	Yu Jingtian / Tony (余景天) ↑1	Yu Jingtian / Tony (余景天) =	Yu Jingtian / Tony (余景天) =	Yu Jingtian / Tony (余景天) =	Yu Jingtian / Tony (余景天) =	Yu Jingtian / Tony (余景天) =	
2	Yu Jingtian / Tony (余景天)	Li Junhao / Rimiko (李俊濠) ↓1	Li Junhao / Rimiko (李俊濠) =	Liang Sen (梁森) ↑1	Luo Yizhou (罗一舟) ↑12	Luo Yizhou (罗一舟) =	Luo Yizhou (罗一舟) =	
3	Tang Jiuzhou / JOJO (唐九洲)	Liang Sen (梁森) ↑3	Liang Sen (梁森) =	Lian Huaiwei (连淮伟) ↑3	Lian Huaiwei (连淮伟) =	Sun Yihang (孙亦航) ↑1	Lian Huaiwei (连淮伟) ↑1	
4	Lian Huaiwei (连淮伟)	Wei Hongyu (魏宏宇) ↑80	Wei Hongyu (魏宏宇) =	Li Junhao / Rimiko (李俊濠) ↓2	Sun Yihang (孙亦航) ↑3	Lian Huaiwei (连淮伟) ↓1	Tang Jiuzhou / JOJO (唐九洲) ↑1	
5	Sun Yihang (孙亦航)	Tang Jiuzhou / JOJO (唐九洲) ↓2	Tang Jiuzhou / JOJO (唐九洲) =	Tang Jiuzhou / JOJO (唐九洲) =	Tang Jiuzhou / JOJO (唐九洲) =	Tang Jiuzhou / JOJO (唐九洲) =	Sun Yinghao / Kachine (孙滢皓) ↑1	
6	Liang Sen (梁森)	Lian Huaiwei (连淮伟) ↓2	Lian Huaiwei (连淮伟) =	Wei Hongyu (魏宏宇) ↓2	Sun Yinghao / Kachine (孙滢皓) ↑5	Sun Yinghao / Kachine (孙滢皓) =	Liu Guanyou / Neil (刘冠佑) ↑7	
7	Liu Jun (刘隽)	Sun Yihang (孙亦航) ↓2	Sun Yihang (孙亦航) =	Sun Yihang (孙亦航) =	Liang Sen (梁森) ↓5	Duan Xingxing / X (段星星) ↑3	Sun Yihang (孙亦航) ↓4	
8	Jiang Jingzuo (姜京佐)	Deng Xiaoci / Jerome.D (邓孝慈) ↑4	Liu Jun (刘隽) ↑1	Liu Jun (刘隽) =	Liu Jun (刘隽) =	Liang Sen (梁森) ↓1	Duan Xingxing / X (段星星) ↓1	
9	IKELILI (艾克里里)	Liu Jun (刘隽) ↓2	Deng Xiaoci / Jerome.D (邓孝慈) ↓1	Deng Xiaoci / Jerome.D (邓孝慈) =	Chang Huasen / Waston (常华森) ↑7	Liu Jun (刘隽) ↓1	Shi Qi / Chase Lee (十七) ↑6	

=== Elimination Chart ===
Color key

Final members of IXFORM
Contestants eliminated in the final episode
Contestants eliminated in the third elimination round
Contestants eliminated in the second elimination round
Contestants eliminated in the first elimination round
Contestants left the show

Youth With You Season 3 Contestants
Luo Yizhou (罗一舟)	Lian Huaiwei (连淮伟)	Tang Jiuzhou / JOJO (唐九洲)	Sun Yinghao / Kachine (孙滢皓)	Liu Guanyou / Neil (刘冠佑)
Sun Yihang (孙亦航)	Duan Xingxing / X (段星星)	Deng Xiaoci / Jerome.D (邓孝慈)	Liu Jun (刘隽)	Shi Qi / Chase Lee (十七)
Chang Huasen / Waston (常华森)	Du Tianyu / Jacky (杜天宇)	Liang Sen (梁森)	Li Junhao / Rimiko (李俊濠)	Xu Xinchi / Nemo (徐新驰)
Xu Ziwei (徐子未)	He Derui (何德瑞)	Yang Haoming (杨昊铭)	Wang Nanjun / Krystian (王南钧)	Yu Jingtian / Tony (余景天)
Chen Yugeng / Crayon (陈誉庚)	Jiang Jingzuo (姜京佐)	Zhang Siyuan / G.G (张思源)	Deng Zeming / Jeremy (邓泽鸣)	Chen Junhao / Drcchen (陈俊豪)
Yuta Hashimoto / Yuta (桥本裕太)	Wang Jiachen (汪佳辰)	Yan Xi / Liam (彦希)	Cao Yu / BoogieFish (草鱼)	Yi Xuan / KINGSTON (亿轩)
Zi Yu (梓渝)	Huang Hongming / Alan (黄泓铭)	Qiu Danfeng / Chuk (邱丹枫)	Zheng Xingyuan (郑星源)	Li Qin / Kin (李钦)
Bai Lu (白陆)	Wei Hongyu (魏宏宇)	Chen Junyu / Jaydon (陈俊宇)	Gong Yixing / Owen (龚毅星)	Wei Xingcheng / Vic Wei (魏星丞)
Wan Yuchen / Yuchoen (万禹辰)	Cui Yunfeng / Otter (崔云峰)	Ailizati (艾力扎提)	Ke Er / Cole (柯尔)	Liu Junhao / Kaiden (刘俊昊)
Ke’er Lijun / Keerlijun (苛尔力钧)	Niu Zaizai (牛在在)	Bai Ding / Dow (白丁)	Wang Haoxuan / WD (王浩轩)	IKELILI (艾克里里)
Ayu (阿煜)	Chen Dingding / DING (陈鼎鼎)	Xu Zhuolun / Casper (许卓伦)	Zhong Junyi / ONE (钟骏一)	Han Jingde / Hans (韩竞德)
Wang Linkai / Jason. K (王琳凯)	Li Mingxu (黎明旭)	Zhou Zijie (周子杰)	Zhao Jinyao / S.Titch (赵瑾尧)	Han Ruize (韩瑞泽)
Liu Xin / LilStar (刘欣)	Xiong Yiwen / Kuma (熊艺文)	Feng Chen Sinan / Merman (冯陈思楠)	Qi Ha / Husky (七哈)	Xiao He / River (小河)
Tang Jiaqi / Andy (唐嘉齐)	Liu Qi (刘琦)	Shi Qijun / MR.17 (十七君)	Gao Yibai / Hosky (高一百)	Ka Si / Cass (卡斯)
Zhong Fulin / Jony (钟福林)	Cao Zijun / Dream (曹子俊)	Xuan Hao / Swen (宣淏)	Liang Hongli / Evaldo (梁弘立)	Chen Jianyu / DeDe (陈建宇)
Zhang Jingyun (张景昀)	Yang Yangyang (杨阳洋)	Aierfajin / Alpha (爱尔法金)	Li Tianyi (李添翼)	Yang Tao / TAOO (杨淘)
Ma Sihan / SAI (马思涵)	Fu Xueyan / Fu (付雪岩)	Lin Yiming / LIN (麟壹铭)	Ying Chenxi / Layzon (应晨熙)	Yu Yanlong (余衍隆)
Fang Zheng (方政)	Huang He / River. (黄河)	Liu Fenglei / Leo (刘峰磊)	Li Haolin / Tommy (李昊霖)	Li Shuo / Joker (李硕)
Zhe Ye / Ken (哲野)	Yang Zhixiang / The Dream (杨智翔)	Xu Bin (徐滨)	Mu Sen / Tim (木森)	Chen Xuanxiao (陈泫孝)
Zhou Junyu / Neil (周峻宇)	Li Yuan / Russell (李远)	Yang Yuehan / Johan (杨约翰)	Zhong Zhuorong / Jeremy (钟卓融)	Zhang Shuaibo (张帅博)
Hu Xuanhao / SoNeX (胡轩豪)	Chen Jinxin / JAYDEN (陈金鑫)	Shi Shang (时尚)	Bao Han / Kepler (包涵)	Kong Xiangchi / KK (孔祥池)
Yang Haojun / Lucas (杨皓钧)	Cai Feiyang (蔡飞扬)	Wu Yue / May (武悦)	Zhan Zhan / J-jin (湛展)	Huang Jianxi / Ebon (黄鉴曦)
Yang Boni / Bernie (杨泊尼)	Li Tianqi (李天琪)	Chen Zilong (陈子龙)	Jiang Zhihao / Ian (蒋智豪)	Cao Yuxue (曹宇雪)
Shi An (时安)	Li Zichen / Lion Lee (李子晨)	Zhao Mingxuan (赵明轩)	Wang Zi’ao / Hussein (王梓澳)	

== Episodes ==
=== Premiere (17 February 2021) ===
The mentors perform their stages. Their performances are repeated in episode 1.

=== Episode 1 (18 February 2021) ===
This year the episode starts with a media conference. The trainees are asked to enter an interview either individually or as a group. This is similar to the grouping in the following evaluation performance, except for a group of trainees that have been singled out as the new N-class (stands for newbie class), where each trainee has had equal or less than 3 months of training. There are 30 media representatives present, who interview the trainees about their pasts, interests and ideas on what an idol should represent. Some trainees are shown to be very eloquent, while others quiver in fear. The trainees then move into the dorm.

The next day begins with the stage performances of the mentors. Lisa performs two dances, one to 《Lover》 by Cai Xukun and one to 《Intentions》 by Justin Bieber. Li Ronghao performs his own song 《selfie》, Will Pan also performs his own song 《Coming Home》 and Esther Yu debuts her song 《Gwalla》. Afterwards Li Yuchun enters and explains this years new rules: All performances will be live vocal performances. Each trainee will be graded according to their initial performance with A, B, C or N. A stands for excellent, C stands for pass. N will be the Newcomer class, where trainees will receive extra tutoring from the Youth tutor Esther Yu. Lisa is present via video call, while Esther Yu is not part of the grading. The performances are separated into different categories (e.g. originals, same song, rap battle etc.) and there are always two or more performances in direct comparison.

Episode 1: Evaluation stage
Song	Original Artist	Company	Name	Class
《Hot Hot Hot》	ProducePandas	DMDF Entertainment (大美德丰)	Otter (崔云峰)	C
《Hot Hot Hot》	ProducePandas	DMDF Entertainment (大美德丰)	DING (陈鼎鼎)	C
《Hot Hot Hot》	ProducePandas	DMDF Entertainment (大美德丰)	Cass (卡斯)	C
《Hot Hot Hot》	ProducePandas	DMDF Entertainment (大美德丰)	Husky (七哈)	C
《Hot Hot Hot》	ProducePandas	DMDF Entertainment (大美德丰)	MR.17 (十七君)	C
《Follow Me》	Original Song	HKBX Entertainment	Han Ruize (韓瑞澤)	C
《Follow Me》	Original Song	HKBX Entertainment	Li Mingxu (黎明旭)	C
《Follow Me》	Original Song	HKBX Entertainment	Yuchoen (萬禹辰)	C
《Follow Me》	Original Song	HKBX Entertainment	Zheng Xingyuan (鄭星源)	B
《Follow Me》	Original Song	HKBX Entertainment	Zi Yu (梓渝)	C
《Alive》	Lin Mo/ Yu Muyang/ Mo Wenxuan	Original Plan Entertainment (原际画)	Sun Yihang (孫亦航)	B
《Alive》	Lin Mo/ Yu Muyang/ Mo Wenxuan	Original Plan Entertainment (原际画)	Yang Yangyang (楊陽洋)	N
《Uranus》	Tony	Astro Music (星宇愔乐)	Tony (余景天)	A

=== Episode 2 (20 February 2021) ===
Evaluation stages continue.

Episode 2: Evaluation stage
Song	Original Artist	Company	Name	Class
《Very look alike》	Ryan.B	Gramarie Entertainment (果然娱乐)	SoNeX (胡轩豪)	N
《Very look alike》	Ryan.B	Summerstar	Dream (曹子俊)	N
《Very look alike》	Ryan.B	M+ Entertainment (木加互娱)	Drcchen (陈俊豪)	N
《THANK U》	IKELILI	Huayi Hohan Film & Television	IKELILI (余晓辉)	B
《Piano》	Liam Yan	Independent Trainee	Liam (彦希)	C
《Tom&Jerry》	Hongyu Wei	BF Entertainment (大脸娱乐)	Wei Hongyu (魏宏宇)	A
《Moonlight》	Lil Milk	Times Fengjun Entertainment	Rimiko (李俊濠)	C
《Moonlight》	Lil Milk	Banana Entertainment(香蕉娱乐)	S.Titch (赵瑾尧)	N
《Moonlight》	Lil Milk	Young Entertainment	Liang Sen (梁森)	A
《Excuse Me》	D7 Boys	NUCLEAR FIRE MEDIA	Leo (劉峰磊)	N
《Excuse Me》	D7 Boys	NUCLEAR FIRE MEDIA	Kuma (熊藝文)	B
《Excuse Me》	D7 Boys	NUCLEAR FIRE MEDIA	Jin (湛展)	C
《Monica》	Leslie Cheung	D·Wang Entertainment(大王娱乐)	Cao Yuxue (曹宇雪)	C
《Monica》	Leslie Cheung	D·Wang Entertainment(大王娱乐)	Li Tianqi (李天琪)	B
《Monica》	Leslie Cheung	D·Wang Entertainment(大王娱乐)	Lion Lee (李子晨)	C
《Monica》	Leslie Cheung	D·Wang Entertainment(大王娱乐)	Zhao Mingxuan (赵明轩)	C
《Chong Po》	Mr. TyGer	STAR MASTER	Kerlijun (苛爾力鈞)	B
《Chong Po》	Mr. TyGer	STAR MASTER	Tim (木森)	C
《Chong Po》	Mr. TyGer	STAR MASTER	Shi Shang (時尚)	B
《Chong Po》	Mr. TyGer	STAR MASTER	Ken (哲野)	B
《Tiger》	Lil Ghost	B/G Entertainment (黑金计划)	Kin (李钦)	C
《Tiger》	Lil Ghost	B/G Entertainment (黑金计划)	Joker (李硕)	C
《Tiger》	Lil Ghost	B/G Entertainment (黑金计划)	Krystian (王南钧)	B
《Tiger》	Lil Ghost	B/G Entertainment (黑金计划)	Layzon (应晨熙)	C
《Tiger》	Lil Ghost	Beingjing Youhug Media Co. Ltd	DeDe (Chen Jianyu/陳建宇)	C
《Tiger》	Lil Ghost	Beingjing Youhug Media Co. Ltd	Ian (Jiang Zhihao/蔣智豪)	C
《Tiger》	Lil Ghost	Beingjing Youhug Media Co. Ltd	KK (Kong Xiangchi/孔祥池)	C
《Tiger》	Lil Ghost	Beingjing Youhug Media Co. Ltd	Luo Yizhou (羅一舟)	A
《Tiger》	Lil Ghost	B.K Entertainment (彬稞娱乐)	Bai Lu (白陆)	B
《Tiger》	Lil Ghost	M - Nation	X (Duan Xingxing/段星星)	A
《Tiger》	Lil Ghost	Fatang Culture (范堂文化)	Wang Jiachen (汪佳辰)	B
《Tiger》	Lil Ghost	LaoyuVision	Kachine (Sun Yinghao/孫瀅皓)	A
《Chu Deng Chang》	Allizati and Russel	Beijing simply joy culture development Co. Ltd.	Allizati (艾力扎提)	C
《Chu Deng Chang》	Allizati and Russel	Beijing simply joy culture development Co. Ltd.	Russel (李遠)	N
《Man in the mirror》	River	JS Entertainment	River (小河)	N
《ALL G THE WAY》	G.G. Zhang Siyuan	Beijing Chuyiin Culture Media Co. Ltd.	G.G. Zhang Siyuan (張思源)	B
《Wake Me Up》	WD	HEDGEHOG BROTHERS (刺猬兄弟)	WD (王浩軒)	C
《Light》	Chen Li	HeSong Entertainment	Chase Lee (李政)	B
《Boy》	TREASURE	YG Entertainment	JAYDEN (陳金鑫)	B
《Boy》	TREASURE	YG Entertainment	Kingston (億軒)	C
《Let's Dance Together》	Nine Percent	Super Idol	River (黃河)	C
《Let's Dance Together》	Nine Percent	Super Idol	Tommy (李昊霖)	C
《Falling In Love》	UNIQ	Yihua Entertainment (壹华娱乐)	Liu Qi (劉琦)	C
《Falling In Love》	UNIQ	Yihua Entertainment (壹华娱乐)	JOJO(唐九州)	N
《Falling In Love》	UNIQ	Yihua Entertainment (壹华娱乐)	Zhang Jingyun (張景昀)	C

=== Episode 3 (25 February 2021) ===
Evaluation stages continue.

Episode 3: Evaluation stage
Song	Original Artist	Company	Name	Class
《Star Diary》	Nemo	Firefly (萦火丛传媒)	Nemo (徐新驰)	N
《AI》	Z.TAO	LT. ENTERTAINMENT (龙韬娱乐)	ONE (钟骏一)	C
《Ridiculous》	Dreamfish	SHOWCITYTIMES (少城时代)	Jaydon (陈俊宇)	B
《Ridiculous》	Dreamfish	SHOWCITYTIMES (少城时代)	Dow (白丁)	B
《Ridiculous》	Dreamfish	SHOWCITYTIMES (少城时代)	Andy (唐嘉齐)	B
《Ridiculous》	Dreamfish	SHOWCITYTIMES (少城时代)	Swen (宣淏)	C
《Thorn》	BC21	Qin's Entertainment (坤音娱乐)	LilStar (刘欣)	N
《Thorn》	BC21	Qin's Entertainment (坤音娱乐)	TAOO (杨淘)	N
《Thorn》	BC21	Qin's Entertainment (坤音娱乐)	LIN (麟壹铭)	C
《Thorn》	BC21	Qin's Entertainment (坤音娱乐)	Merman (冯陈思楠)	B
《Thorn》	BC21	Qin's Entertainment (坤音娱乐)	SAI (马思涵)	C
《Slow Cooling》	Fish Leong	SJ. (庶吉影视)	Casper (许卓伦)	C
《Slow Cooling》	Fish Leong	Beijing Why Entertainment Co., Ltd. (未禾娱乐)	Jeremy (钟卓融)	C
《Slow Cooling》	Fish Leong	Original Stone Music (原石音乐)	May (武悦)	C
《Slow Cooling》	Fish Leong	Avex China (爱贝克思)	Xu Ziwei (徐子未)	A
《Growing Up With High Pressure》	Tai Yi	Independent Trainee	Liu Jun (刘隽)	A
《Best of Us》	Best of Us	CIWEN MEDIA (慈文影视)	Jeremy (邓泽鸣)	B
《Love Story Wa Totsuzen Ni》	Tokyo Love Story	Sony Music Labels Inc. (日本索尼音乐)	Yuta Hashimoto (桥本裕太)	C
《Back To Me》	Yang Haoming	SHENGSHIGUANGNIAN (盛世光年)	Yang Haoming (曹宇雪)	B
《Football Gang》	Lu Han	STF	Cai Feiyang (蔡飞扬)	C
《Football Gang》	Lu Han	STF	Ebon (黄鉴曦)	C
《Football Gang》	Lu Han	STF	Fang Zheng (方政)	C
《Football Gang》	Lu Han	STF	Jason. K (王琳凯)	C
《Football Gang》	Lu Han	STF	The Dream (杨智翔)	B
《MANTA》	Lexie	LIANHUAIWEI STUDIO (连淮伟工作室)	Lian Huaiwei (连淮伟)	C
《The Second I Got A Name》	5 Different Doors	HAOHAN Entertainment (浩瀚娱乐)	Waston (常华森)	N
《The Second I Got A Name》	5 Different Doors	HAOHAN Entertainment (浩瀚娱乐)	Neil (刘冠佑)	B
《The Second I Got A Name》	5 Different Doors	HAOHAN Entertainment (浩瀚娱乐)	Kaiden (刘俊昊)	N
《The Second I Got A Name》	5 Different Doors	HAOHAN Entertainment (浩瀚娱乐)	Li Tianyi (李添翼)	N
《The Second I Got A Name》	5 Different Doors	HAOHAN Entertainment (浩瀚娱乐)	Zhang Shuaibo (张帅博)	N
《The Second I Got A Name》	5 Different Doors	HAOHAN Entertainment (浩瀚娱乐)	Kepler (包涵)	N
《The Second I Got A Name》	5 Different Doors	Guang Pu Yu Le (光谱娱乐)	Xu Bin (徐滨)	N
《The Second I Got A Name》	5 Different Doors	RE MEDIA (冉翼文化)	Jerome.D (邓孝慈)	N
《The Second I Got A Name》	5 Different Doors	GAOYIBAI STUDIO (翼百影视文化)	Hosky (高一百)	N
《Gravitation》	Silence Wang	TIANMAXINGHE (天马星河)	Jacky (杜天宇)	N
《It's You》	Ryan B.	Independent Trainee	Alan (黄泓铭)	N
《It's You》	Ryan B.	MANTRA PICTURES (工夫真言)	Shi An (时安)	N
《It's You》	Ryan B.	Beijing Lan Mei Tailor Made Production Culture (海西星生)	Hans (韩竞德)	N
《It's You》	Ryan B.	MOUNTAINTOP (泰洋川禾)	Lucas (杨皓钧)	N
《It's You》	Ryan B.	TAOXIUGUANGYING (淘秀光影)	Niu Zaizai (牛在在)	N
《It's You》	Ryan B.	YC (一澄娱乐)	Evaldo (梁弘立)	N
《ChaCha of Love》	Bao Shi Gem	Chenfan Entertainment (宸帆娱乐)	Jony (钟福林)	N
《To Youth》	Faye Wong	JH Entertainment (瑾和娱乐)	Ayu (阿煜)	C

=== Episode 4 (27 February 2021) ===
Position evaluation songs are announced. The first few performances of the Position Evaluations occur.

== Missions ==
=== Mission 1: Position Evaluation ===
Color key

- Winner
- Leader
- Center
- Leader & Center
- Newbie 'N' Class (Note: The N Class trainees are grouped separately from Class A, B and C during song selection.)

Position	Song	Original Artist	Group Votes	Name	Personal Votes	Rank Within Group	Rank Within Position	Rank Overall
Dance	Sunshine, Rainbow, White Horse (阳光彩虹小白马)	Wowkie Zhang	89	Bai Ding	11	4	17	50
Dance	Sunshine, Rainbow, White Horse (阳光彩虹小白马)	Wowkie Zhang	89	Cao Yu	16	3	14	33
Dance	Sunshine, Rainbow, White Horse (阳光彩虹小白马)	Wowkie Zhang	89	Chen Dingding	7	5	27	76
Dance	Sunshine, Rainbow, White Horse (阳光彩虹小白马)	Wowkie Zhang	89	Duan Xingxing	0	9	43	117
Dance	Sunshine, Rainbow, White Horse (阳光彩虹小白马)	Wowkie Zhang	89	Huang Jianxi	1	8	39	111
Dance	Sunshine, Rainbow, White Horse (阳光彩虹小白马)	Wowkie Zhang	89	Lian Huaiwei	27	1	5	15
Dance	Sunshine, Rainbow, White Horse (阳光彩虹小白马)	Wowkie Zhang	89	Liu Guanyou	17	2	12	30
Dance	Sunshine, Rainbow, White Horse (阳光彩虹小白马)	Wowkie Zhang	89	Shi Qijun	4	7	31	92
Dance	Sunshine, Rainbow, White Horse (阳光彩虹小白马)	Wowkie Zhang	89	Sun Yihang	6	6	28	79
Dance	Kick It (英雄)	NCT 127	91	Kong Xiangchi	0	7	43	117
Dance	Kick It (英雄)	NCT 127	91	Luo Yizhou	37	1	1	9
Dance	Kick It (英雄)	NCT 127	91	Wan Yuchen	3	4	33	98
Dance	Kick It (英雄)	NCT 127	91	Wang Jiachen	3	4	33	98
Dance	Kick It (英雄)	NCT 127	91	Yu Jingtian	35	2	2	11
Dance	Kick It (英雄)	NCT 127	91	Zhang Jingyun	10	3	21	59
Dance	Kick It (英雄)	NCT 127	91	Zhong Junyi	3	4	33	98
Dance	Drowned (悬溺)	Ge Dongqi (葛东琪)	83	Bai Lu	6	5	28	79
Dance	Drowned (悬溺)	Ge Dongqi (葛东琪)	83	IKELILI	18	1	10	26
Dance	Drowned (悬溺)	Ge Dongqi (葛东琪)	83	Mu Sen	6	5	28	79
Dance	Drowned (悬溺)	Ge Dongqi (葛东琪)	83	Xiong Yiwen	16	4	14	33
Dance	Drowned (悬溺)	Ge Dongqi (葛东琪)	83	Xuan Hao	2	7	37	105
Dance	Drowned (悬溺)	Ge Dongqi (葛东琪)	83	Yan Xi	17	3	12	30
Dance	Drowned (悬溺)	Ge Dongqi (葛东琪)	83	Zhao Mingxuan	18	1	10	26
Dance	New Creature (新物种)	Chris Lee	94	Jiang Jingzuo	10	5	21	59
Dance	New Creature (新物种)	Chris Lee	94	Lin Yiming	11	3	17	50
Dance	New Creature (新物种)	Chris Lee	94	Liu Jun	32	1	3	13
Dance	New Creature (新物种)	Chris Lee	94	Sun Yinghao	19	2	9	24
Dance	New Creature (新物种)	Chris Lee	94	Wang Nanjun	11	3	17	50
Dance	New Creature (新物种)	Chris Lee	94	Yi Xuan	10	5	21	59
Dance	New Creature (新物种)	Chris Lee	94	Ying Chenxi	1	7	39	111
Dance	The Unknown Me (无人知晓的我)	A-Lin	90	Cao Zijun	8	5	26	67
Dance	The Unknown Me (无人知晓的我)	A-Lin	90	Chang Huasen	31	1	4	14
Dance	The Unknown Me (无人知晓的我)	A-Lin	90	Du Tianyu	10	4	21	59
Dance	The Unknown Me (无人知晓的我)	A-Lin	90	Gong Yixing	4	6	31	92
Dance	The Unknown Me (无人知晓的我)	A-Lin	90	Liu Xin	20	2	7	21
Dance	The Unknown Me (无人知晓的我)	A-Lin	90	Wei Xingcheng	16	3	14	33
Dance	The Unknown Me (无人知晓的我)	A-Lin	90	Yang Haojun	1	7	39	111
Dance	EN (嗯)	Li Ronghao	74	Bao Han	1	7	39	111
Dance	EN (嗯)	Li Ronghao	74	Chen Yugeng	27	1	5	15
Dance	EN (嗯)	Li Ronghao	74	Gao Yibai	2	6	37	105
Dance	EN (嗯)	Li Ronghao	74	Han Jingde	11	3	17	50
Dance	EN (嗯)	Li Ronghao	74	Li Yuan	3	5	33	98
Dance	EN (嗯)	Li Ronghao	74	Zhang Shuaibo	20	2	7	21
Dance	EN (嗯)	Li Ronghao	74	Zhao Jinyao	10	4	21	59
Vocal	Love, Exist (爱,存在)	Wei Qiqi (魏奇奇)	94	Cai Feiyang	3	6	34	98
Vocal	Love, Exist (爱,存在)	Wei Qiqi (魏奇奇)	94	Chen Jinxin	14	3	12	39
Vocal	Love, Exist (爱,存在)	Wei Qiqi (魏奇奇)	94	Cui Yunfeng	40	1	3	6
Vocal	Love, Exist (爱,存在)	Wei Qiqi (魏奇奇)	94	Feng Chen Sinan	18	2	8	26
Vocal	Love, Exist (爱,存在)	Wei Qiqi (魏奇奇)	94	Yuta Hashimoto	12	4	16	46
Vocal	Love, Exist (爱,存在)	Wei Qiqi (魏奇奇)	94	Zheng Xingyuan	7	5	26	76
Vocal	Close To You (天天)	David Tao	95	Chen Junyu	12	4	16	46
Vocal	Close To You (天天)	David Tao	95	Liu Qi	33	1	5	12
Vocal	Close To You (天天)	David Tao	95	Shi Shang	2	7	37	105
Vocal	Close To You (天天)	David Tao	95	Wei Hongyu	3	6	34	98
Vocal	Close To You (天天)	David Tao	95	Yang Haoming	19	2	7	24
Vocal	Close To You (天天)	David Tao	95	Zhou Zijie	11	5	19	50
Vocal	Close To You (天天)	David Tao	95	Zi Yu	15	3	11	37
Vocal	Wings of Love (燕尾蝶)	Fish Leong	97	Deng Zeming	17	2	10	30
Vocal	Wings of Love (燕尾蝶)	Fish Leong	97	Li Tianqi	5	5	29	84
Vocal	Wings of Love (燕尾蝶)	Fish Leong	97	Tang Jiaqi	2	6	37	105
Vocal	Wings of Love (燕尾蝶)	Fish Leong	97	Xu Zhuolun	7	4	26	76
Vocal	Wings of Love (燕尾蝶)	Fish Leong	97	Xu Ziwei	55	1	1	1
Vocal	Wings of Love (燕尾蝶)	Fish Leong	97	Yu Yanlong	11	3	19	50
Vocal	Let Me Stay By Your Side (让我留在你身边)	Eason Chan	97	Ayu	10	5	22	59
Vocal	Let Me Stay By Your Side (让我留在你身边)	Eason Chan	97	Fang Zheng	38	1	4	8
Vocal	Let Me Stay By Your Side (让我留在你身边)	Eason Chan	97	Li Mingxu	2	7	37	105
Vocal	Let Me Stay By Your Side (让我留在你身边)	Eason Chan	97	Li Qin	12	4	16	46
Vocal	Let Me Stay By Your Side (让我留在你身边)	Eason Chan	97	Ma Sihan	13	3	15	45
Vocal	Let Me Stay By Your Side (让我留在你身边)	Eason Chan	97	Qi Ha	8	6	24	67
Vocal	Let Me Stay By Your Side (让我留在你身边)	Eason Chan	97	Zhe Ye	14	2	12	39
Vocal	Rainie Love (雨爱)	Rainie Yang	80	Chen Xuanxiao	14	2	12	39
Vocal	Rainie Love (雨爱)	Rainie Yang	80	Chen Zilong	8	5	24	67
Vocal	Rainie Love (雨爱)	Rainie Yang	80	Deng Xiaoci	10	4	22	59
Vocal	Rainie Love (雨爱)	Rainie Yang	80	Hu Xuanhao	26	1	6	17
Vocal	Rainie Love (雨爱)	Rainie Yang	80	Huang Hongming	5	7	29	84
Vocal	Rainie Love (雨爱)	Rainie Yang	80	Liang Hongli	11	3	19	50
Vocal	Rainie Love (雨爱)	Rainie Yang	80	Yang Tao	6	6	28	79
Vocal	Gravitation (心引力)	Jolin Tsai, Wang Junkai	85	He Derui	48	1	2	3
Vocal	Gravitation (心引力)	Jolin Tsai, Wang Junkai	85	Li Tianyi	5	3	29	84
Vocal	Gravitation (心引力)	Jolin Tsai, Wang Junkai	85	Qiu Danfeng	2	7	37	105
Vocal	Gravitation (心引力)	Jolin Tsai, Wang Junkai	85	Tang Jiuzhou	18	2	8	26
Vocal	Gravitation (心引力)	Jolin Tsai, Wang Junkai	85	Wang Zi’ao	5	3	29	84
Vocal	Gravitation (心引力)	Jolin Tsai, Wang Junkai	85	Yang Yangyang	4	5	33	92
Vocal	Gravitation (心引力)	Jolin Tsai, Wang Junkai	85	Zhou Junyu	3	6	34	98
Rap	You Can't Beat Me (你打不过我吧)	Gengfeng Chaoren (跟风超人)	85	Cao Yuxue	1	6	33	111
Rap	You Can't Beat Me (你打不过我吧)	Gengfeng Chaoren (跟风超人)	85	Fu Xueyan	5	5	26	84
Rap	You Can't Beat Me (你打不过我吧)	Gengfeng Chaoren (跟风超人)	85	Han Ruize	6	4	25	79
Rap	You Can't Beat Me (你打不过我吧)	Gengfeng Chaoren (跟风超人)	85	Ka Si	12	3	15	46
Rap	You Can't Beat Me (你打不过我吧)	Gengfeng Chaoren (跟风超人)	85	Ke’er Lijun	47	1	3	5
Rap	You Can't Beat Me (你打不过我吧)	Gengfeng Chaoren (跟风超人)	85	Li Junhao	14	2	12	39
Rap	Unworthy (不值得)	Meng Feichuan (梦飞船)	91	Liang Sen	24	2	7	19
Rap	Unworthy (不值得)	Meng Feichuan (梦飞船)	91	Shi Qi	16	3	10	33
Rap	Unworthy (不值得)	Meng Feichuan (梦飞船)	91	Wu Yue	11	5	16	50
Rap	Unworthy (不值得)	Meng Feichuan (梦飞船)	91	Yang Yuehan	14	4	12	39
Rap	Unworthy (不值得)	Meng Feichuan (梦飞船)	91	Zhang Siyuan	26	1	6	17
Rap	Dare To Say It (我敢说)	Original	94	Ailizati	20	2	9	21
Rap	Dare To Say It (我敢说)	Original	94	Li Zichen	8	4	19	67
Rap	Dare To Say It (我敢说)	Original	94	Wang Haoxuan	39	1	4	7
Rap	Dare To Say It (我敢说)	Original	94	Wang Linkai	14	3	12	39
Rap	Dare To Say It (我敢说)	Original	94	Yang Zhixiang	8	4	19	67
Rap	Dare To Say It (我敢说)	Original	94	Zhong Zhuorong	5	6	26	84
Rap	No One (无敌)	Deng Chao	89	Chen Jianyu	4	6	30	92
Rap	No One (无敌)	Deng Chao	89	Huang He	36	1	5	10
Rap	No One (无敌)	Deng Chao	89	Jiang Zhihao	11	3	16	50
Rap	No One (无敌)	Deng Chao	89	Li Haolin	23	2	8	20
Rap	No One (无敌)	Deng Chao	89	Li Shuo	10	4	18	59
Rap	No One (无敌)	Deng Chao	89	Zhan Zhan	5	5	26	84
Rap	Can't Help But Love (不得不爱)	Will Pan, Xianzi	83	Niu Zaizai	15	2	11	37
Rap	Can't Help But Love (不得不爱)	Will Pan, Xianzi	83	Shi An	4	5	30	92
Rap	Can't Help But Love (不得不爱)	Will Pan, Xianzi	83	Xiao He	8	3	19	67
Rap	Can't Help But Love (不得不爱)	Will Pan, Xianzi	83	Xu Xinchi	48	1	2	3
Rap	Can't Help But Love (不得不爱)	Will Pan, Xianzi	83	Yang Boni	0	6	35	117
Rap	Can't Help But Love (不得不爱)	Will Pan, Xianzi	83	Zhong Fulin	8	3	19	67
Rap	Love is Doubt (爱是怀疑)	Eason Chan	76	Aierfajin	5	4	26	84
Rap	Love is Doubt (爱是怀疑)	Eason Chan	76	Chen Junhao	50	1	1	2
Rap	Love is Doubt (爱是怀疑)	Eason Chan	76	Ke Er	1	6	33	111
Rap	Love is Doubt (爱是怀疑)	Eason Chan	76	Liu Fenglei	4	5	30	92
Rap	Love is Doubt (爱是怀疑)	Eason Chan	76	Liu Junhao	8	2	19	67
Rap	Love is Doubt (爱是怀疑)	Eason Chan	76	Xu Bin	8	2	19	67

Ranking of Position Evaluation (Only Dance)
Name	Ranking	Number of Votes
Liu Jun	1	20032
Sun Yinghao	2	10019
Lin Yiming	3	10011
Wang Nanjun	3	10011
Jiang Jingzuo	5	10010
Yi Xuan	5	10010
Ying Chenxi	7	10001
Luo Yizhou	8	3037
Yu Jingtian	9	3035
Zhang Jingyun	10	3010
Wan Yuchen	11	3003
Wang Jiachen	11	3003
Zhong Junyi	11	3003
Kong Xiangchi	14	3000
Chang Huasen	15	31
Chen Yugeng	16	27
Lian Huaiwei	16	27
Liu Xin	18	20
Zhang Shuaibo	18	20
IKELILI	20	18
Zhao Mingxuan	20	18
Liu Guanyou	22	17
Yan Xi	22	17
Cao Yu	24	16
Wei Xingcheng	24	16
Xiong Yiwen	24	16
Bai Ding	27	11
Han Jingde	27	11
Du Tianyu	29	10
Zhao Jinyao	29	10
Cao Zijun	31	8
Chen Dingding	32	7
Bai Lu	33	6
Mu Sen	33	6
Sun Yihang	33	6
Gong Yixing	36	4
Shi Qijun	36	4
Li Yuan	38	3
Gao Yibai	39	2
Xuan Hao	39	2
Bao Han	41	1
Huang Jianxi	41	1
Yang Haojun	41	1
Duan Xingxing	44	0

Ranking of Position Evaluation (Only Vocal)
Name	Ranking	Number of Votes
Xu Ziwei	1	20055
Fang Zheng	2	20038
Deng Zeming	3	10017
Zhe Ye	4	10014
Ma Sihan	5	10013
Li Qin	6	10012
Yu Yanlong	7	10011
Ayu	8	10010
Qi Ha	9	10008
Xu Zhuolun	10	10007
Li Tianqi	11	10005
Li Mingxu	12	10002
Tang Jiaqi	12	10002
He Derui	14	48
Cui Yunfeng	15	40
Liu Qi	16	33
Hu Xuanhao	17	26
Yang Haoming	18	19
Feng Chen Sinan	19	18
Tang Jiuzhou	19	18
Zi Yu	21	15
Chen Jinxin	22	14
Chen Xuanxiao	22	14
Chen Junyu	24	12
Yuta Hashimoto	24	12
Liang Hongli	26	11
Zhou Zijie	26	11
Deng Xiaoci	28	10
Chen Zilong	29	8
Zheng Xingyuan	30	7
Yang Tao	31	6
Huang Hongming	32	5
Li Tianyi	32	5
Wang Zi’ao	32	5
Yang Yangyang	35	4
Cai Feiyang	36	3
Wei Hongyu	36	3
Zhou Junyu	36	3
Qiu Danfeng	39	2
Shi Shang	39	2

Ranking of Position Evaluation (Only Rap)
Name	Ranking	Number of Votes
Wang Haoxuan	1	20039
Ailizati	2	10020
Wang Linkai	3	10014
Li Zichen	4	10008
Yang Zhixiang	4	10008
Zhong Zhuorong	6	10005
Zhang Siyuan	7	3026
Liang Sen	8	3024
Shi Qi	9	3016
Yang Yuehan	10	3014
Wu Yue	11	3011
Chen Junhao	12	50
Xu Xinchi	13	48
Ke’er Lijun	14	47
Huang He	15	36
Li Haolin	16	23
Niu Zaizai	17	15
Li Junhao	18	14
Ka Si	19	12
Jiang Zhihao	20	11
Li Shuo	21	10
Liu Junhao	22	8
Xiao He	22	8
Xu Bin	22	8
Zhong Fulin	22	8
Han Ruize	26	6
Aierfajin	27	5
Fu Xueyan	27	5
Zhan Zhan	27	5
Chen Jianyu	30	4
Liu Fenglei	30	4
Shi An	30	4
Cao Yuxue	33	1
Ke Er	33	1
Yang Boni	35	0

Ranking of Position Evaluation
Name	Ranking	Number of Votes
Xu Ziwei	1	20055
Wang Haoxuan	2	20039
Fang Zheng	3	20038
Liu Jun	4	20032
Ailizati	5	10020
Sun Yinghao	6	10019
Deng Zeming	7	10017
Wang Linkai	8	10014
Zhe Ye	8	10014
Ma Sihan	10	10013
Li Qin	11	10012
Lin Yiming	12	10011
Wang Nanjun	12	10011
Yu Yanlong	12	10011
Ayu	15	10010
Jiang Jingzuo	15	10010
Yi Xuan	15	10010
Li Zichen	18	10008
Qi Ha	18	10008
Yang Zhixiang	18	10008
Xu Zhuolun	21	10007
Li Tianqi	22	10005
Zhong Zhuorong	22	10005
Li Mingxu	24	10002
Tang Jiaqi	24	10002
Ying Chenxi	26	10001
Luo Yizhou	27	3037
Yu Jingtian	28	3035
Zhang Siyuan	29	3026
Liang Sen	30	3024
Shi Qi	31	3016
Yang Yuehan	32	3014
Wu Yue	33	3011
Zhang Jingyun	34	3010
Wan Yuchen	35	3003
Wang Jiachen	35	3003
Zhong Junyi	35	3003
Kong Xiangchi	38	3000
Chen Junhao	39	50
He Derui	40	48
Xu Xinchi	40	48
Ke’er Lijun	42	47
Cui Yunfeng	43	40
Huang He	44	36
Liu Qi	45	33
Chang Huasen	46	31
Chen Yugeng	47	27
Lian Huaiwei	47	27
Hu Xuanhao	49	26
Li Haolin	50	23
Liu Xin	51	20
Zhang Shuaibo	51	20
Yang Haoming	53	19
Feng Chen Sinan	54	18
IKELILI	54	18
Tang Jiuzhou	54	18
Zhao Mingxuan	54	18
Liu Guanyou	58	17
Yan Xi	58	17
Cao Yu	60	16
Wei Xingcheng	60	16
Xiong Yiwen	60	16
Niu Zaizai	63	15
Zi Yu	63	15
Chen Jinxin	65	14
Chen Xuanxiao	65	14
Li Junhao	65	14
Chen Junyu	68	12
Ka Si	68	12
Yuta Hashimoto	68	12
Bai Ding	71	11
Han Jingde	71	11
Jiang Zhihao	71	11
Liang Hongli	71	11
Zhou Zijie	71	11
Deng Xiaoci	76	10
Du Tianyu	76	10
Li Shuo	76	10
Zhao Jinyao	76	10
Cao Zijun	80	8
Chen Zilong	80	8
Liu Junhao	80	8
Xiao He	80	8
Xu Bin	80	8
Zhong Fulin	80	8
Chen Dingding	86	7
Zheng Xingyuan	86	7
Bai Lu	88	6
Han Ruize	88	6
Mu Sen	88	6
Sun Yihang	88	6
Yang Tao	88	6
Aierfajin	93	5
Fu Xueyan	93	5
Huang Hongming	93	5
Li Tianyi	93	5
Wang Zi’ao	93	5
Zhan Zhan	93	5
Chen Jianyu	99	4
Gong Yixing	99	4
Liu Fenglei	99	4
Shi An	99	4
Shi Qijun	99	4
Yang Yangyang	99	4
Cai Feiyang	105	3
Li Yuan	105	3
Wei Hongyu	105	3
Zhou Junyu	105	3
Gao Yibai	109	2
Qiu Danfeng	109	2
Shi Shang	109	2
Xuan Hao	109	2
Bao Han	113	1
Cao Yuxue	113	1
Huang Jianxi	113	1
Ke Er	113	1
Yang Haojun	113	1
Duan Xingxing	118	0
Yang Boni	118	0

=== Mission 2: Expression Stage ===
Color key

- Winner
- Leader
- Center

Age	Song	Original Artist	Name	Group Votes	Rank Within Age Group	Rank Overall
18-19	Never Get Low (别认怂)	Jam Hsiao, Will Pan, Vava, Henry Lau	Ailizati	138	1	6
18-19	Never Get Low (别认怂)	Jam Hsiao, Will Pan, Vava, Henry Lau	Bao Han	138	1	6
18-19	Never Get Low (别认怂)	Jam Hsiao, Will Pan, Vava, Henry Lau	Deng Zeming	138	1	6
18-19	Never Get Low (别认怂)	Jam Hsiao, Will Pan, Vava, Henry Lau	Fang Zheng	138	1	6
18-19	Never Get Low (别认怂)	Jam Hsiao, Will Pan, Vava, Henry Lau	Han Jingde	138	1	6
18-19	Never Get Low (别认怂)	Jam Hsiao, Will Pan, Vava, Henry Lau	Liu Xin	138	1	6
18-19	Never Get Low (别认怂)	Jam Hsiao, Will Pan, Vava, Henry Lau	Shi An	138	1	6
18-19	Never Get Low (别认怂)	Jam Hsiao, Will Pan, Vava, Henry Lau	Sun Yihang	138	1	6
18-19	Never Get Low (别认怂)	Jam Hsiao, Will Pan, Vava, Henry Lau	Xu Xinchi	138	1	6
18-19	Never Get Low (别认怂)	Jam Hsiao, Will Pan, Vava, Henry Lau	Yang Yangyang	138	1	6
18-19	Never Get Low (别认怂)	Jam Hsiao, Will Pan, Vava, Henry Lau	Zhang Shuaibo	138	1	6
18-19	If It Weren't You (如果不是你)	You Zhangjing	Cao Zijun	125	2	8
18-19	If It Weren't You (如果不是你)	You Zhangjing	Du Tianyu	125	2	8
18-19	If It Weren't You (如果不是你)	You Zhangjing	Liu Guanyou	125	2	8
18-19	If It Weren't You (如果不是你)	You Zhangjing	Shi Qi	125	2	8
18-19	If It Weren't You (如果不是你)	You Zhangjing	Xu Bin	125	2	8
18-19	If It Weren't You (如果不是你)	You Zhangjing	Yang Haojun	125	2	8
18-19	If It Weren't You (如果不是你)	You Zhangjing	Ying Chenxi	125	2	8
18-19	If It Weren't You (如果不是你)	You Zhangjing	Yu Jingtian	125	2	8
18-19	If It Weren't You (如果不是你)	You Zhangjing	Zhang Jingyun	125	2	8
18-19	If It Weren't You (如果不是你)	You Zhangjing	Zhong Junyi	125	2	8
18-19	If It Weren't You (如果不是你)	You Zhangjing	Zi Yu	125	2	8
20-22	No Music No Life (无乐不作)	Van Fan	Feng Chen Sinan	148	2	4
20-22	No Music No Life (无乐不作)	Van Fan	Fu Xueyan	148	2	4
20-22	No Music No Life (无乐不作)	Van Fan	Han Ruize	148	2	4
20-22	No Music No Life (无乐不作)	Van Fan	Kong Xiangchi	148	2	4
20-22	No Music No Life (无乐不作)	Van Fan	Luo Yizhou	148	2	4
20-22	No Music No Life (无乐不作)	Van Fan	Qiu Danfeng	148	2	4
20-22	No Music No Life (无乐不作)	Van Fan	Tang Jiuzhou	148	2	4
20-22	No Music No Life (无乐不作)	Van Fan	Wang Jiachen	148	2	4
20-22	No Music No Life (无乐不作)	Van Fan	Wang Nanjun	148	2	4
20-22	No Music No Life (无乐不作)	Van Fan	Yi Xuan	148	2	4
20-22	Feeling So Good (倍儿爽)	Wowkie Zhang	Bai Ding	76	5	11
20-22	Feeling So Good (倍儿爽)	Wowkie Zhang	Huang He	76	5	11
20-22	Feeling So Good (倍儿爽)	Wowkie Zhang	Li Haolin	76	5	11
20-22	Feeling So Good (倍儿爽)	Wowkie Zhang	Wang Haoxuan	76	5	11
20-22	Feeling So Good (倍儿爽)	Wowkie Zhang	Wang Linkai	76	5	11
20-22	Feeling So Good (倍儿爽)	Wowkie Zhang	Yang Zhixiang	76	5	11
20-22	Feeling So Good (倍儿爽)	Wowkie Zhang	Yu Yanlong	76	5	11
20-22	Feeling So Good (倍儿爽)	Wowkie Zhang	Zhao Mingxuan	76	5	11
20-22	Feeling So Good (倍儿爽)	Wowkie Zhang	Zhong Fulin	76	5	11
20-22	Letting Go (解脱)	Nicky Lee	Chen Yugeng	143	3	5
20-22	Letting Go (解脱)	Nicky Lee	Deng Xiaoci	143	3	5
20-22	Letting Go (解脱)	Nicky Lee	Gong Yixing	143	3	5
20-22	Letting Go (解脱)	Nicky Lee	Hu Xuanhao	143	3	5
20-22	Letting Go (解脱)	Nicky Lee	Huang Jianxi	143	3	5
20-22	Letting Go (解脱)	Nicky Lee	Li Mingxu	143	3	5
20-22	Letting Go (解脱)	Nicky Lee	Li Yuan	143	3	5
20-22	Letting Go (解脱)	Nicky Lee	Lian Huaiwei	143	3	5
20-22	Letting Go (解脱)	Nicky Lee	Liang Hongli	143	3	5
20-22	Letting Go (解脱)	Nicky Lee	Wei Xingcheng	143	3	5
20-22	Who is The Real MVP (谁是MVP)	Will Pan	Aierfajin	102	4	10
20-22	Who is The Real MVP (谁是MVP)	Will Pan	Chen Jinxin	102	4	10
20-22	Who is The Real MVP (谁是MVP)	Will Pan	Chen Junhao	102	4	10
20-22	Who is The Real MVP (谁是MVP)	Will Pan	Chen Junyu	102	4	10
20-22	Who is The Real MVP (谁是MVP)	Will Pan	Sun Yinghao	102	4	10
20-22	Who is The Real MVP (谁是MVP)	Will Pan	Wan Yuchen	102	4	10
20-22	Who is The Real MVP (谁是MVP)	Will Pan	Wei Hongyu	102	4	10
20-22	Who is The Real MVP (谁是MVP)	Will Pan	Wu Yue	102	4	10
20-22	Who is The Real MVP (谁是MVP)	Will Pan	Xu Zhuolun	102	4	10
20-22	Who is The Real MVP (谁是MVP)	Will Pan	Yang Haoming	102	4	10
20-22	Where Has The Time Gone (时间都去哪儿了)	Reno Wang (王铮亮)	Cai Feiyang	169	1	1
20-22	Where Has The Time Gone (时间都去哪儿了)	Reno Wang (王铮亮)	Chen Jianyu	169	1	1
20-22	Where Has The Time Gone (时间都去哪儿了)	Reno Wang (王铮亮)	Cui Yunfeng	169	1	1
20-22	Where Has The Time Gone (时间都去哪儿了)	Reno Wang (王铮亮)	Li Tianyi	169	1	1
20-22	Where Has The Time Gone (时间都去哪儿了)	Reno Wang (王铮亮)	Li Zichen	169	1	1
20-22	Where Has The Time Gone (时间都去哪儿了)	Reno Wang (王铮亮)	Liu Fenglei	169	1	1
20-22	Where Has The Time Gone (时间都去哪儿了)	Reno Wang (王铮亮)	Liu Junhao	169	1	1
20-22	Where Has The Time Gone (时间都去哪儿了)	Reno Wang (王铮亮)	Tang Jiaqi	169	1	1
20-22	Where Has The Time Gone (时间都去哪儿了)	Reno Wang (王铮亮)	Yang Tao	169	1	1
20-22	Where Has The Time Gone (时间都去哪儿了)	Reno Wang (王铮亮)	Zhao Jinyao	169	1	1
20-22	Where Has The Time Gone (时间都去哪儿了)	Reno Wang (王铮亮)	Zheng Xingyuan	169	1	1
20-22	Where Has The Time Gone (时间都去哪儿了)	Reno Wang (王铮亮)	Zhou Junyu	169	1	1
23-25	Ximen Youth (西门少年)	Chris Lee	Bai Lu	110	3	9
23-25	Ximen Youth (西门少年)	Chris Lee	Chang Huasen	110	3	9
23-25	Ximen Youth (西门少年)	Chris Lee	Gao Yibai	110	3	9
23-25	Ximen Youth (西门少年)	Chris Lee	Ke Er	110	3	9
23-25	Ximen Youth (西门少年)	Chris Lee	Ke’er Lijun	110	3	9
23-25	Ximen Youth (西门少年)	Chris Lee	Li Junhao	110	3	9
23-25	Ximen Youth (西门少年)	Chris Lee	Li Qin	110	3	9
23-25	Ximen Youth (西门少年)	Chris Lee	Li Tianqi	110	3	9
23-25	Ximen Youth (西门少年)	Chris Lee	Ma Sihan	110	3	9
23-25	Ximen Youth (西门少年)	Chris Lee	Niu Zaizai	110	3	9
23-25	Ximen Youth (西门少年)	Chris Lee	Zhe Ye	110	3	9
23-25	Ximen Youth (西门少年)	Chris Lee	Zhou Zijie	110	3	9
23-25	The Weight of Life (成长之重量)	Li Ronghao	Chen Xuanxiao	160	1	2
23-25	The Weight of Life (成长之重量)	Li Ronghao	Chen Zilong	160	1	2
23-25	The Weight of Life (成长之重量)	Li Ronghao	He Derui	160	1	2
23-25	The Weight of Life (成长之重量)	Li Ronghao	Huang Hongming	160	1	2
23-25	The Weight of Life (成长之重量)	Li Ronghao	Jiang Jingzuo	160	1	2
23-25	The Weight of Life (成长之重量)	Li Ronghao	Li Shuo	160	1	2
23-25	The Weight of Life (成长之重量)	Li Ronghao	Mu Sen	160	1	2
23-25	The Weight of Life (成长之重量)	Li Ronghao	Qi Ha	160	1	2
23-25	The Weight of Life (成长之重量)	Li Ronghao	Xiao He	160	1	2
23-25	The Weight of Life (成长之重量)	Li Ronghao	Xu Ziwei	160	1	2
23-25	The Weight of Life (成长之重量)	Li Ronghao	Xuan Hao	160	1	2
23-25	The Weight of Life (成长之重量)	Li Ronghao	Yan Xi	160	1	2
23-25	Jade (玉)	Tai Yi (太一)	Cao Yuxue	149	2	3
23-25	Jade (玉)	Tai Yi (太一)	Duan Xingxing	149	2	3
23-25	Jade (玉)	Tai Yi (太一)	Jiang Zhihao	149	2	3
23-25	Jade (玉)	Tai Yi (太一)	Liang Sen	149	2	3
23-25	Jade (玉)	Tai Yi (太一)	Lin Yiming	149	2	3
23-25	Jade (玉)	Tai Yi (太一)	Liu Jun	149	2	3
23-25	Jade (玉)	Tai Yi (太一)	Liu Qi	149	2	3
23-25	Jade (玉)	Tai Yi (太一)	Xiong Yiwen	149	2	3
23-25	Jade (玉)	Tai Yi (太一)	Yang Yuehan	149	2	3
23-25	Jade (玉)	Tai Yi (太一)	Yuta Hashimoto	149	2	3
23-25	Jade (玉)	Tai Yi (太一)	Zhan Zhan	149	2	3
23-25	Jade (玉)	Tai Yi (太一)	Zhong Zhuorong	149	2	3
26+	Come Back (救赎)	Wang Linkai	Ayu	134	1	7
26+	Come Back (救赎)	Wang Linkai	Cao Yu	134	1	7
26+	Come Back (救赎)	Wang Linkai	Chen Dingding	134	1	7
26+	Come Back (救赎)	Wang Linkai	IKELILI	134	1	7
26+	Come Back (救赎)	Wang Linkai	Ka Si	134	1	7
26+	Come Back (救赎)	Wang Linkai	Shi Qijun	134	1	7
26+	Come Back (救赎)	Wang Linkai	Shi Shang	134	1	7
26+	Come Back (救赎)	Wang Linkai	Yang Boni	134	1	7
26+	Come Back (救赎)	Wang Linkai	Zhang Siyuan	134	1	7

Ranking of Expression Stage
Name	Ranking	Number of Votes
Cai Feiyang	1	20169
Chen Jianyu	1	20169
Cui Yunfeng	1	20169
Li Tianyi	1	20169
Li Zichen	1	20169
Liu Fenglei	1	20169
Liu Junhao	1	20169
Tang Jiaqi	1	20169
Yang Tao	1	20169
Zhao Jinyao	1	20169
Zheng Xingyuan	1	20169
Zhou Junyu	1	20169
Chen Xuanxiao	13	10160
Chen Zilong	13	10160
He Derui	13	10160
Huang Hongming	13	10160
Jiang Jingzuo	13	10160
Li Shuo	13	10160
Mu Sen	13	10160
Qi Ha	13	10160
Xiao He	13	10160
Xu Ziwei	13	10160
Xuan Hao	13	10160
Yan Xi	13	10160
Cao Yuxue	25	5149
Duan Xingxing	25	5149
Jiang Zhihao	25	5149
Liang Sen	25	5149
Lin Yiming	25	5149
Liu Jun	25	5149
Liu Qi	25	5149
Xiong Yiwen	25	5149
Yang Yuehan	25	5149
Yuta Hashimoto	25	5149
Zhan Zhan	25	5149
Zhong Zhuorong	25	5149
Feng Chen Sinan	37	148
Fu Xueyan	37	148
Han Ruize	37	148
Kong Xiangchi	37	148
Luo Yizhou	37	148
Qiu Danfeng	37	148
Tang Jiuzhou	37	148
Wang Jiachen	37	148
Wang Nanjun	37	148
Yi Xuan	37	148
Chen Yugeng	47	143
Deng Xiaoci	47	143
Gong Yixing	47	143
Hu Xuanhao	47	143
Huang Jianxi	47	143
Li Mingxu	47	143
Li Yuan	47	143
Lian Huaiwei	47	143
Liang Hongli	47	143
Wei Xingcheng	47	143
Ailizati	57	138
Bao Han	57	138
Deng Zeming	57	138
Fang Zheng	57	138
Han Jingde	57	138
Liu Xin	57	138
Shi An	57	138
Sun Yihang	57	138
Xu Xinchi	57	138
Yang Yangyang	57	138
Zhang Shuaibo	57	138
Ayu	68	134
Cao Yu	68	134
Chen Dingding	68	134
IKELILI	68	134
Ka Si	68	134
Shi Qijun	68	134
Shi Shang	68	134
Yang Boni	68	134
Zhang Siyuan	68	134
Cao Zijun	77	125
Du Tianyu	77	125
Liu Guanyou	77	125
Shi Qi	77	125
Xu Bin	77	125
Yang Haojun	77	125
Ying Chenxi	77	125
Yu Jingtian	77	125
Zhang Jingyun	77	125
Zhong Junyi	77	125
Zi Yu	77	125
Bai Lu	88	110
Chang Huasen	88	110
Gao Yibai	88	110
Ke Er	88	110
Ke’er Lijun	88	110
Li Junhao	88	110
Li Qin	88	110
Li Tianqi	88	110
Ma Sihan	88	110
Niu Zaizai	88	110
Zhe Ye	88	110
Zhou Zijie	88	110
Aierfajin	100	102
Chen Jinxin	100	102
Chen Junhao	100	102
Chen Junyu	100	102
Sun Yinghao	100	102
Wan Yuchen	100	102
Wei Hongyu	100	102
Wu Yue	100	102
Xu Zhuolun	100	102
Yang Haoming	100	102
Bai Ding	110	76
Huang He	110	76
Li Haolin	110	76
Wang Haoxuan	110	76
Wang Linkai	110	76
Yang Zhixiang	110	76
Yu Yanlong	110	76
Zhao Mingxuan	110	76
Zhong Fulin	110	76

=== Mission 3: Group Battle ===
Color key

- Winner
- Leader
- Center

Song	Original Artist	Group	Name	Position	Personal Votes	Group Votes	Studio Evaluation			
Song	Original Artist	Group	Name	Position	Personal Votes	Group Votes	Group	Name	Mentor Votes	Best Trainee(s)
OKAY	Jackson Wang	A	He Derui	Lead Singer	20	251	A	Cao Yu	4	Lian Huaiwei
OKAY	Jackson Wang	A	Shi Qi	Rap, Deputy Lead Singer	12	251	A	Li Junhao	4	Lian Huaiwei
OKAY	Jackson Wang	A	Sun Yinghao	Main Dance, Deputy Lead Singer	97	251	A	Sun Yihang	4	Lian Huaiwei
OKAY	Jackson Wang	A	Yi Xuan	Rap, Deputy Lead Singer	29	251	A	Yan Xi	4	Lian Huaiwei
OKAY	Jackson Wang	A	Yu Jingtian	Rap, Deputy Lead Singer	93	251	A	Yang Haoming	4	Lian Huaiwei
OKAY	Jackson Wang	B	Chen Junhao	Rap, Deputy Lead Singer	30	112	B	Ailizati	0	Lian Huaiwei
OKAY	Jackson Wang	B	IKELILI	Deputy Lead Singer	8	112	B	Lian Huaiwei	0	Lian Huaiwei
OKAY	Jackson Wang	B	Liang Sen	Main Dance, Rap, Deputy Lead Singer	38	112	B	Wang Jiachen	0	Lian Huaiwei
OKAY	Jackson Wang	B	Wan Yuchen	Lead Singer	26	112	B	Xu Zhuolun	0	Lian Huaiwei
OKAY	Jackson Wang	B	Wang Haoxuan	Rap, Deputy Lead Singer	10	112	B	Zhou Zijie	0	Lian Huaiwei
Stop Sugar	Gen Neo	A	Ke’er Lijun	Rap, Deputy Lead Singer	19	150	A	Bai Lu	0	Jiang Jingzuo
Stop Sugar	Gen Neo	A	Li Junhao	Rap, Deputy Lead Singer	23	150	A	Chen Junyu	0	Jiang Jingzuo
Stop Sugar	Gen Neo	A	Xu Zhuolun	Lead Singer	23	150	A	Deng Zeming	0	Jiang Jingzuo
Stop Sugar	Gen Neo	A	Yang Haoming	Main Dance, Deputy Lead Singer	63	150	A	Sun Yinghao	0	Jiang Jingzuo
Stop Sugar	Gen Neo	A	Zhou Zijie	Deputy Lead Singer	22	150	A	Zhong Junyi	0	Jiang Jingzuo
Stop Sugar	Gen Neo	B	Li Qin	Rap, Deputy Lead Singer	8	230	B	Chang Huasen	4	Jiang Jingzuo
Stop Sugar	Gen Neo	B	Luo Yizhou	Lead Singer	95	230	B	Cui Yunfeng	4	Jiang Jingzuo
Stop Sugar	Gen Neo	B	Tang Jiuzhou	Deputy Lead Singer	46	230	B	Jiang Jingzuo	4	Jiang Jingzuo
Stop Sugar	Gen Neo	B	Wang Jiachen	Main Dance, Deputy Lead Singer	29	230	B	Li Mingxu	4	Jiang Jingzuo
Stop Sugar	Gen Neo	B	Xu Xinchi	Rap, Deputy Lead Singer	52	230	B	Qiu Danfeng	4	Jiang Jingzuo
Stand (立)	Jason (符龙飞)	A	Ailizati	Rap	11	204	A	Ayu	4	Wang Haoxuan
Stand (立)	Jason (符龙飞)	A	Chen Yugeng	Rap	36	204	A	Bai Ding	4	Wang Haoxuan
Stand (立)	Jason (符龙飞)	A	Duan Xingxing	Lead Singer	64	204	A	Li Qin	4	Wang Haoxuan
Stand (立)	Jason (符龙飞)	A	Liu Guanyou	Main Dance, Rap	70	204	A	Wang Haoxuan	4	Wang Haoxuan
Stand (立)	Jason (符龙飞)	A	Wei Xingcheng	Rap	23	204	A	Wei Hongyu	4	Wang Haoxuan
Stand (立)	Jason (符龙飞)	B	Chen Dingding	Lead Singer	21	154	B	Deng Xiaoci	0	Wang Haoxuan
Stand (立)	Jason (符龙飞)	B	Ke Er	Rap	20	154	B	Han Ruize	0	Wang Haoxuan
Stand (立)	Jason (符龙飞)	B	Zhao Jinyao	Rap	17	154	B	Huang Hongming	0	Wang Haoxuan
Stand (立)	Jason (符龙飞)	B	Zheng Xingyuan	Main Dance, Rap	29	154	B	Ke Er	0	Wang Haoxuan
Stand (立)	Jason (符龙飞)	B	Zi Yu	Rap	67	154	B	Liu Junhao	0	Wang Haoxuan
Tou Tou (偷偷)	Cai Hefeng (蔡鶴峰)	A	Ayu	Deputy Lead Singer	12	87	A	Chen Dingding	1	Liu Jun Chen Junhao Ke’er Lijun Liang Sen
Tou Tou (偷偷)	Cai Hefeng (蔡鶴峰)	A	Bai Ding	Deputy Lead Singer	18	87	A	Liu Jun	1	Liu Jun Chen Junhao Ke’er Lijun Liang Sen
Tou Tou (偷偷)	Cai Hefeng (蔡鶴峰)	A	Chen Junyu	Lead Singer	22	87	A	Niu Zaizai	1	Liu Jun Chen Junhao Ke’er Lijun Liang Sen
Tou Tou (偷偷)	Cai Hefeng (蔡鶴峰)	A	Wang Linkai	Rap	21	87	A	Wang Nanjun	1	Liu Jun Chen Junhao Ke’er Lijun Liang Sen
Tou Tou (偷偷)	Cai Hefeng (蔡鶴峰)	A	Wei Hongyu	Rap	14	87	A	Xu Xinchi	1	Liu Jun Chen Junhao Ke’er Lijun Liang Sen
Tou Tou (偷偷)	Cai Hefeng (蔡鶴峰)	B	Deng Zeming	Deputy Lead Singer	40	271	B	Chen Junhao	3	Liu Jun Chen Junhao Ke’er Lijun Liang Sen
Tou Tou (偷偷)	Cai Hefeng (蔡鶴峰)	B	Du Tianyu	Rap	23	271	B	Ke’er Lijun	3	Liu Jun Chen Junhao Ke’er Lijun Liang Sen
Tou Tou (偷偷)	Cai Hefeng (蔡鶴峰)	B	Liu Junhao	Rap	18	271	B	Liang Sen	3	Liu Jun Chen Junhao Ke’er Lijun Liang Sen
Tou Tou (偷偷)	Cai Hefeng (蔡鶴峰)	B	Xu Ziwei	Lead Singer	128	271	B	Zhang Siyuan	3	Liu Jun Chen Junhao Ke’er Lijun Liang Sen
Tou Tou (偷偷)	Cai Hefeng (蔡鶴峰)	B	Yuta Hashimoto	Deputy Lead Singer	62	271	B	Zheng Xingyuan	3	Liu Jun Chen Junhao Ke’er Lijun Liang Sen
History	EXO	A	Cao Yu	Rap, Deputy Lead Singer	26	134	A	Chen Yugeng	4	Zhao Jinyao
History	EXO	A	Gong Yixing	Lead Singer	20	134	A	Luo Yizhou	4	Zhao Jinyao
History	EXO	A	Han Jingde	Rap, Deputy Lead Singer	32	134	A	Wang Linkai	4	Zhao Jinyao
History	EXO	A	Sun Yihang	Main Dance, Deputy Lead Singer	43	134	A	Yi Xuan	4	Zhao Jinyao
History	EXO	A	Zhang Siyuan	Deputy Lead Singer	13	134	A	Zhao Jinyao	4	Zhao Jinyao
History	EXO	B	Cui Yunfeng	Lead Singer	47	223	B	He Derui	0	Zhao Jinyao
History	EXO	B	Jiang Jingzuo	Rap, Deputy Lead Singer	62	223	B	Shi Qi	0	Zhao Jinyao
History	EXO	B	Liu Jun	Main Dance, Deputy Lead Singer	59	223	B	Wan Yuchen	0	Zhao Jinyao
History	EXO	B	Wang Nanjun	Deputy Lead Singer	47	223	B	Yu Jingtian	0	Zhao Jinyao
History	EXO	B	Zhong Junyi	Rap, Deputy Lead Singer	8	223	B	Zi Yu	0	Zhao Jinyao
Cinderella	CNBLUE	A	Bai Lu	Main Dance, Rap, Deputy Lead Singer	19	208	A	IKELILI	2 (Note: Group A won with 36 votes from trainees themselves.)	Liu Guanyou
Cinderella	CNBLUE	A	Chang Huasen	Deputy Lead Singer	48	208	A	Liu Guanyou	2	Liu Guanyou
Cinderella	CNBLUE	A	Li Mingxu	Deputy Lead Singer	12	208	A	Tang Jiuzhou	2	Liu Guanyou
Cinderella	CNBLUE	A	Lian Huaiwei	Rap, Deputy Lead Singer	95	208	A	Xu Ziwei	2	Liu Guanyou
Cinderella	CNBLUE	A	Yan Xi	Lead Singer	34	208	A	Yuta Hashimoto	2	Liu Guanyou
Cinderella	CNBLUE	B	Deng Xiaoci	Rap, Deputy Lead Singer	34	115	B	Du Tianyu	2	Liu Guanyou
Cinderella	CNBLUE	B	Han Ruize	Main Dance, Rap, Deputy Lead Singer	6	115	B	Duan Xingxing	2	Liu Guanyou
Cinderella	CNBLUE	B	Huang Hongming	Lead Singer	32	115	B	Gong Yixing	2	Liu Guanyou
Cinderella	CNBLUE	B	Niu Zaizai	Deputy Lead Singer	37	115	B	Han Jingde	2	Liu Guanyou
Cinderella	CNBLUE	B	Qiu Danfeng	Deputy Lead Singer	6	115	B	Wei Xingcheng	2	Liu Guanyou

Ranking of Group Battle
Name	Ranking	Number of Votes
Xu Ziwei	1	80128
Yuta Hashimoto	2	80062
Deng Zeming	3	80040
Du Tianyu	4	80023
Liu Junhao	5	80018
Sun Yinghao	6	30097
Lian Huaiwei	7	30095
Luo Yizhou	7	30095
Yu Jingtian	9	30093
Liu Guanyou	10	30070
Duan Xingxing	11	30064
Jiang Jingzuo	12	30062
Liu Jun	13	30059
Xu Xinchi	14	30052
Chang Huasen	15	30048
Cui Yunfeng	16	30047
Wang Nanjun	16	30047
Tang Jiuzhou	18	30046
Chen Yugeng	19	30036
Yan Xi	20	30034
Wang Jiachen	21	30029
Yi Xuan	21	30029
Wei Xingcheng	23	30023
He Derui	24	30020
Bai Lu	25	30019
Li Mingxu	26	30012
Shi Qi	26	30012
Ailizati	28	30011
Li Qin	29	30008
Zhong Junyi	29	30008
Zi Yu	31	67
Yang Haoming	32	63
Sun Yihang	33	43
Liang Sen	34	38
Niu Zaizai	35	37
Deng Xiaoci	36	34
Han Jingde	37	32
Huang Hongming	37	32
Chen Junhao	39	30
Zheng Xingyuan	40	29
Cao Yu	41	26
Wan Yuchen	41	26
Li Junhao	43	23
Xu Zhuolun	43	23
Chen Junyu	45	22
Zhou Zijie	45	22
Chen Dingding	47	21
Wang Linkai	47	21
Gong Yixing	49	20
Ke Er	49	20
Ke’er Lijun	51	19
Bai Ding	52	18
Zhao Jinyao	53	17
Wei Hongyu	54	14
Zhang Siyuan	55	13
Ayu	56	12
Wang Haoxuan	57	10
IKELILI	58	8
Han Ruize	59	6
Qiu Danfeng	59	6

=== Mission 4: Theme Evaluation ===
Color key

- Winner
- Leader
- Center

Song	Genre	Style	Before Elimination		After Elimination		Personal Votes	Group Votes	Top 20 Fan Meeting
Song	Genre	Style	Group	Name	Group Name	Name	Personal Votes	Group Votes	Top 20 Fan Meeting
Domesticator (驯化者)	Trap	Pride and Joy	A	Jiang Jingzuo	Dragon Training Kindergarten	Chen Junhao	6	199	(not performed)
Domesticator (驯化者)	Trap	Pride and Joy	A	Liang Sen	Dragon Training Kindergarten	Chen Junhao	6	199	(not performed)
Domesticator (驯化者)	Trap	Pride and Joy	A	Luo Yizhou	Dragon Training Kindergarten	Chen Yugeng	6	199	(not performed)
Domesticator (驯化者)	Trap	Pride and Joy	A	Tang Jiuzhou	Dragon Training Kindergarten	Chen Yugeng	6	199	(not performed)
Domesticator (驯化者)	Trap	Pride and Joy	A	Wang Nanjun	Dragon Training Kindergarten	Jiang Jingzuo	7	199	(not performed)
Domesticator (驯化者)	Trap	Pride and Joy	A	Zhang Siyuan	Dragon Training Kindergarten	Jiang Jingzuo	7	199	(not performed)
Domesticator (驯化者)	Trap	Pride and Joy	A	Zhong Junyi	Dragon Training Kindergarten	Liu Guanyou	17	199	(not performed)
Domesticator (驯化者)	Trap	Pride and Joy	B	Bai Ding	Dragon Training Kindergarten	Liu Guanyou	17	199	(not performed)
Domesticator (驯化者)	Trap	Pride and Joy	B	Chen Junhao	Dragon Training Kindergarten	Luo Yizhou	141	199	(not performed)
Domesticator (驯化者)	Trap	Pride and Joy	B	Chen Yugeng	Dragon Training Kindergarten	Luo Yizhou	141	199	(not performed)
Domesticator (驯化者)	Trap	Pride and Joy	B	Liu Guanyou	Dragon Training Kindergarten	Tang Jiuzhou	17	199	(not performed)
Domesticator (驯化者)	Trap	Pride and Joy	B	Luo Yizhou	Dragon Training Kindergarten	Tang Jiuzhou	17	199	(not performed)
Domesticator (驯化者)	Trap	Pride and Joy	B	Wei Hongyu	Dragon Training Kindergarten	Zhang Siyuan	5	199	(not performed)
Domesticator (驯化者)	Trap	Pride and Joy	B	Zhong Junyi	Dragon Training Kindergarten	Zhang Siyuan	5	199	(not performed)
Monsoon (季风环游)	Pop	Sweet and Fresh	A	Ailizati	With You	Deng Zeming	4	41	(not performed)
Monsoon (季风环游)	Pop	Sweet and Fresh	A	Chen Dingding	With You	Deng Zeming	4	41	(not performed)
Monsoon (季风环游)	Pop	Sweet and Fresh	A	Huang Hongming	With You	Huang Hongming	3	41	(not performed)
Monsoon (季风环游)	Pop	Sweet and Fresh	A	Ke Er	With You	Huang Hongming	3	41	(not performed)
Monsoon (季风环游)	Pop	Sweet and Fresh	A	Niu Zaizai	With You	Liang Sen	9	41	(not performed)
Monsoon (季风环游)	Pop	Sweet and Fresh	A	Yuta Hashimoto	With You	Liang Sen	9	41	(not performed)
Monsoon (季风环游)	Pop	Sweet and Fresh	A	Zi Yu	With You	Qiu Danfeng	1	41	(not performed)
Monsoon (季风环游)	Pop	Sweet and Fresh	B	Ailizati	With You	Qiu Danfeng	1	41	(not performed)
Monsoon (季风环游)	Pop	Sweet and Fresh	B	Deng Zeming	With You	Shi Qi	9	41	(not performed)
Monsoon (季风环游)	Pop	Sweet and Fresh	B	Niu Zaizai	With You	Shi Qi	9	41	(not performed)
Monsoon (季风环游)	Pop	Sweet and Fresh	B	Qiu Danfeng	With You	Yuta Hashimoto	13	41	(not performed)
Monsoon (季风环游)	Pop	Sweet and Fresh	B	Wan Yuchen	With You	Yuta Hashimoto	13	41	(not performed)
Monsoon (季风环游)	Pop	Sweet and Fresh	B	Zhao Jinyao	With You	Zi Yu	2	41	(not performed)
Monsoon (季风环游)	Pop	Sweet and Fresh	B	Zhou Zijie	With You	Zi Yu	2	41	(not performed)
Sha Ni (沙溺)	Soul	Loneliness and Heartache	A	Ayu	Cactus	Duan Xingxing	13	44	Duan Xingxing
Sha Ni (沙溺)	Soul	Loneliness and Heartache	A	Cui Yunfeng	Cactus	Duan Xingxing	13	44	Duan Xingxing
Sha Ni (沙溺)	Soul	Loneliness and Heartache	A	Duan Xingxing	Cactus	He Derui	7	44	He Derui
Sha Ni (沙溺)	Soul	Loneliness and Heartache	A	Gong Yixing	Cactus	He Derui	7	44	He Derui
Sha Ni (沙溺)	Soul	Loneliness and Heartache	A	Li Mingxu	Cactus	Li Junhao	5	44	Liang Sen
Sha Ni (沙溺)	Soul	Loneliness and Heartache	A	Li Qin	Cactus	Li Junhao	5	44	Liang Sen
Sha Ni (沙溺)	Soul	Loneliness and Heartache	A	Yi Xuan	Cactus	Li Qin	2	44	Li Junhao
Sha Ni (沙溺)	Soul	Loneliness and Heartache	B	Ayu	Cactus	Li Qin	2	44	Li Junhao
Sha Ni (沙溺)	Soul	Loneliness and Heartache	B	Chen Junyu	Cactus	Xu Ziwei	7	44	Liu Guanyou
Sha Ni (沙溺)	Soul	Loneliness and Heartache	B	Li Mingxu	Cactus	Xu Ziwei	7	44	Liu Guanyou
Sha Ni (沙溺)	Soul	Loneliness and Heartache	B	Wei Xingcheng	Cactus	Yan Xi	4	44	Tang Jiuzhou
Sha Ni (沙溺)	Soul	Loneliness and Heartache	B	Xu Zhuolun	Cactus	Yan Xi	4	44	Tang Jiuzhou
Sha Ni (沙溺)	Soul	Loneliness and Heartache	B	Xu Ziwei	Cactus	Yi Xuan	6	44	Xu Ziwei
Sha Ni (沙溺)	Soul	Loneliness and Heartache	B	Yan Xi	Cactus	Yi Xuan	6	44	Xu Ziwei
Way Up (命中)	Pop	Overbearing and Bossy	A	Ke’er Lijun	Seven Ways	Cao Yu	6	211	Lian Huaiwei
Way Up (命中)	Pop	Overbearing and Bossy	A	Li Junhao	Seven Ways	Cao Yu	6	211	Lian Huaiwei
Way Up (命中)	Pop	Overbearing and Bossy	A	Sun Yinghao	Seven Ways	Lian Huaiwei	22	211	Shi Qi
Way Up (命中)	Pop	Overbearing and Bossy	A	Wang Haoxuan	Seven Ways	Lian Huaiwei	22	211	Shi Qi
Way Up (命中)	Pop	Overbearing and Bossy	A	Xu Xinchi	Seven Ways	Sun Yihang	11	211	Sun Yihang
Way Up (命中)	Pop	Overbearing and Bossy	A	Yang Haoming	Seven Ways	Sun Yihang	11	211	Sun Yihang
Way Up (命中)	Pop	Overbearing and Bossy	A	Yu Jingtian	Seven Ways	Sun Yinghao	20	211	Sun Yinghao
Way Up (命中)	Pop	Overbearing and Bossy	B	Cao Yu	Seven Ways	Sun Yinghao	20	211	Sun Yinghao
Way Up (命中)	Pop	Overbearing and Bossy	B	He Derui	Seven Ways	Xu Xinchi	8	211	Xu Xinchi
Way Up (命中)	Pop	Overbearing and Bossy	B	Lian Huaiwei	Seven Ways	Xu Xinchi	8	211	Xu Xinchi
Way Up (命中)	Pop	Overbearing and Bossy	B	Shi Qi	Seven Ways	Yang Haoming	8	211	Yang Haoming
Way Up (命中)	Pop	Overbearing and Bossy	B	Sun Yihang	Seven Ways	Yang Haoming	8	211	Yang Haoming
Way Up (命中)	Pop	Overbearing and Bossy	B	Wang Haoxuan	Seven Ways	Yu Jingtian	136	211	Yu Jingtian
Way Up (命中)	Pop	Overbearing and Bossy	B	Yu Jingtian	Seven Ways	Yu Jingtian	136	211	Yu Jingtian
Bamboo (竹)	Trap	Exotic and Charming	A	Bai Lu	Hotel Elf	Chang Huasen	9	50	Chang Huasen
Bamboo (竹)	Trap	Exotic and Charming	A	Chang Huasen	Hotel Elf	Chang Huasen	9	50	Chang Huasen
Bamboo (竹)	Trap	Exotic and Charming	A	Deng Xiaoci	Hotel Elf	Deng Xiaoci	15	50	Deng Xiaoci
Bamboo (竹)	Trap	Exotic and Charming	A	Han Jingde	Hotel Elf	Deng Xiaoci	15	50	Deng Xiaoci
Bamboo (竹)	Trap	Exotic and Charming	A	IKELILI	Hotel Elf	Du Tianyu	8	50	Du Tianyu
Bamboo (竹)	Trap	Exotic and Charming	A	Liu Jun	Hotel Elf	Du Tianyu	8	50	Du Tianyu
Bamboo (竹)	Trap	Exotic and Charming	A	Wang Linkai	Hotel Elf	Liu Jun	5	50	Liu Jun
Bamboo (竹)	Trap	Exotic and Charming	B	Chang Huasen	Hotel Elf	Liu Jun	5	50	Liu Jun
Bamboo (竹)	Trap	Exotic and Charming	B	Du Tianyu	Hotel Elf	Wang Jiachen	5	50	Luo Yizhou
Bamboo (竹)	Trap	Exotic and Charming	B	Han Ruize	Hotel Elf	Wang Jiachen	5	50	Luo Yizhou
Bamboo (竹)	Trap	Exotic and Charming	B	Liu Junhao	Hotel Elf	Wang Nanjun	5	50	Wang Nanjun
Bamboo (竹)	Trap	Exotic and Charming	B	Wang Jiachen	Hotel Elf	Wang Nanjun	5	50	Wang Nanjun
Bamboo (竹)	Trap	Exotic and Charming	B	Wang Linkai	Hotel Elf	Zheng Xingyuan	3	50	-
Bamboo (竹)	Trap	Exotic and Charming	B	Zheng Xingyuan	Hotel Elf	Zheng Xingyuan	3	50	-

Ranking of Theme Evaluation
Name	Ranking	Number of Votes
Yu Jingtian	1	200136
Lian Huaiwei	2	50022
Sun Yinghao	3	50020
Sun Yihang	4	50011
Xu Xinchi	5	50008
Yang Haoming	5	50008
Cao Yu	7	50006
Luo Yizhou	8	141
Liu Guanyou	9	17
Tang Jiuzhou	9	17
Deng Xiaoci	11	15
Duan Xingxing	12	13
Yuta Hashimoto	12	13
Chang Huasen	14	9
Liang Sen	14	9
Shi Qi	14	9
Du Tianyu	17	8
He Derui	18	7
Jiang Jingzuo	18	7
Xu Ziwei	18	7
Chen Junhao	21	6
Chen Yugeng	21	6
Yi Xuan	21	6
Li Junhao	24	5
Liu Jun	24	5
Wang Jiachen	24	5
Wang Nanjun	24	5
Zhang Siyuan	24	5
Deng Zeming	29	4
Yan Xi	29	4
Huang Hongming	31	3
Zheng Xingyuan	31	3
Li Qin	33	2
Zi Yu	33	2
Qiu Danfeng	35	1

=== Mission 5: Collaboration Stages ===
Color key

- Leader
- Center
- Leader & Center

Song	Original Artist	Mentors	Name
Kick Back (秘境)	WayV	Lisa	Duan Xingxing
Kick Back (秘境)	WayV	Lisa	Lian Huaiwei
Kick Back (秘境)	WayV	Lisa	Liu Guanyou
Kick Back (秘境)	WayV	Lisa	Liu Jun
Kick Back (秘境)	WayV	Lisa	Yi Xuan
Go Hard (硬闹)	Will Pan	Will Pan	Chen Yugeng
Go Hard (硬闹)	Will Pan	Will Pan	Du Tianyu
Go Hard (硬闹)	Will Pan	Will Pan	Huang Hongming
Go Hard (硬闹)	Will Pan	Will Pan	Shi Qi
Go Hard (硬闹)	Will Pan	Will Pan	Xu Xinchi
Go Hard (硬闹)	Will Pan	Will Pan	Yuta Hashimoto
Don't Regret (不遗憾)	Li Ronghao	Li Ronghao	Chen Junhao
Don't Regret (不遗憾)	Li Ronghao	Li Ronghao	Deng Xiaoci
Don't Regret (不遗憾)	Li Ronghao	Li Ronghao	Deng Zeming
Don't Regret (不遗憾)	Li Ronghao	Li Ronghao	Liang Sen
Don't Regret (不遗憾)	Li Ronghao	Li Ronghao	Tang Jiuzhou
Don't Regret (不遗憾)	Li Ronghao	Li Ronghao	Xu Ziwei
《YES! OK!》 remix 《We Rock》	Theme Song of Youth With You 2 and 3	An Qi, Yu Yan, Lu Keran (The9)	Cao Yu
《YES! OK!》 remix 《We Rock》	Theme Song of Youth With You 2 and 3	An Qi, Yu Yan, Lu Keran (The9)	Chang Huasen
《YES! OK!》 remix 《We Rock》	Theme Song of Youth With You 2 and 3	An Qi, Yu Yan, Lu Keran (The9)	He Derui
《YES! OK!》 remix 《We Rock》	Theme Song of Youth With You 2 and 3	An Qi, Yu Yan, Lu Keran (The9)	Yan Xi
《YES! OK!》 remix 《We Rock》	Theme Song of Youth With You 2 and 3	An Qi, Yu Yan, Lu Keran (The9)	Zhang Siyuan
《YES! OK!》 remix 《We Rock》	Theme Song of Youth With You 2 and 3	An Qi, Yu Yan, Lu Keran (The9)	Zheng Xingyuan
Superpower (超能力)	G.E.M.	G.E.M.	Jiang Jingzuo
Superpower (超能力)	G.E.M.	G.E.M.	Li Qin
Superpower (超能力)	G.E.M.	G.E.M.	Qiu Danfeng
Superpower (超能力)	G.E.M.	G.E.M.	Wang Jiachen
Superpower (超能力)	G.E.M.	G.E.M.	Wang Nanjun
Superpower (超能力)	G.E.M.	G.E.M.	Zi Yu
Shut Up and Dance (闭嘴跳舞)	Chris Lee	Chris Lee	Li Junhao
Shut Up and Dance (闭嘴跳舞)	Chris Lee	Chris Lee	Luo Yizhou
Shut Up and Dance (闭嘴跳舞)	Chris Lee	Chris Lee	Sun Yihang
Shut Up and Dance (闭嘴跳舞)	Chris Lee	Chris Lee	Sun Yinghao
Shut Up and Dance (闭嘴跳舞)	Chris Lee	Chris Lee	Yang Haoming
Shut Up and Dance (闭嘴跳舞)	Chris Lee	Chris Lee	Yu Jingtian

=== Mission 6: Final Stage Performance ===
Color key

- Center

Song	Position	Name
界 (OZONE)	Lead Vocalist	Xu Ziwei
界 (OZONE)	Support Vocalist 1	Liang Sen
界 (OZONE)	Support Vocalist 2	Shi Qi
界 (OZONE)	Support Vocalist 3	Wang Nanjun
界 (OZONE)	Support Vocalist 4	Yu Jingtian
界 (OZONE)	Support Vocalist 5	Sun Yihang
界 (OZONE)	Support Vocalist 6	Xu Xinchi
界 (OZONE)	Support Vocalist 7	Li Junhao
界 (OZONE)	Rapper 1	Lian Huaiwei
界 (OZONE)	Rapper 2	Liu Jun
终章# (ZIP)	Lead Vocalist	He Derui
终章# (ZIP)	Support Vocalist 1	Yang Haoming
终章# (ZIP)	Support Vocalist 2	Tang Jiuzhou
终章# (ZIP)	Support Vocalist 3	Sun Yinghao
终章# (ZIP)	Support Vocalist 4	Du Tianyu
终章# (ZIP)	Support Vocalist 5	Duan Xingxing
终章# (ZIP)	Support Vocalist 6	Chang Huasen
终章# (ZIP)	Rapper 1	Luo Yizhou
终章# (ZIP)	Rapper 2	Liu Guanyou
终章# (ZIP)	Rapper 3	Deng Xiaoci

== Discography ==
=== Singles ===
Title	Album details
We Rock	Released: March 8, 2021; Language: Mandarin

== Incidents ==
=== Censorship ===
On 25 March 2021, the 11th episode of the season was originally scheduled to be aired on that day, but due to the Xinjiang cotton turmoil, and the clothing title of this show was Adidas, the airing of this episode was postponed. On 27 March 2021, when the episode was aired out of order, the brand logo was blurred out.

=== Fan behavior ===
On 11 April 2021, Weibo administrators issued an announcement, citing irrational star-chasing behavior as an excuse to impose a 30-day ban on a series of fan club accounts, many of which are the fan clubs of Youth With You and Produce Camp (Chuang) trainees.

=== Departure of Tony Yu Jingtian ===
On May 5, 2021, it was announced that the leading trainee, Tony Yu Jingtian had departed from the show, citing "health reason", right before the final night, possibly due to pressure from recent scandal involving his parents' alleged illegal businesses.

Before the finale, Tony was involved in a controversy on 30 April 2021, when rumors with multiple photo evidence surfaced on Weibo that his parents had relations to a KTV involved with drugs and prostitution. This caused an outrage among Chinese netizens, as China had a long history of battling with the social implications of drug use. Later that week, it was also questioned if Tony had dual citizenship, having both Chinese and Canadian citizenships, which is illegal in China for anyone over the age of 18 years old. Tony's mom took to social media that they were no longer involved in the operation after having sold it in 2008 but Chinese netizens had dug out court documents dating back to 2020 where his parents were listed as the defendants (owners) in a legal battle involving said KTV. Due to these controversies, many Chinese netizens repeatedly called for the withdrawal of Tony, even though netizens refute that he is innocent.

On 5 May 2021, iQiyi issued a statement that the show has suspended production and recording, following an order issued by the Beijing Municipal Radio and Television Bureau, and promises to make adjustments to the show. Shortly after, on the same day, Tony's agency, Astro Entertainment announced he would be leaving the show, citing "health reasons".

The scandal was investigated to be false accusations, his parents were eventually cleared from any wrongdoing claims.

=== Milk-wasting controversy ===
Aside from the main votes of the domestic and international iQIYI app, Youth With You series also calculates votes from multiple platforms: Weibo, iQIYI Paopao, Mengniu Dairy milk app on WeChat, and others. Mengniu Dairy is the sponsor of the series.

Fans could gain extra votes if they purchase its products and scan the QR codes printed inside the packaging to support their favorite contestant on WeChat. This has resulted in fan clubs buying milk products in huge amounts. This sponsor strategy is also used by another group survival show Produce Camp (Chuang).

During the second season, the QR codes were printed inside the bottle caps. In this season, the show still uses this strategy for its yogurt drinks, but also uses separate QR cards attached for bundle packs or flavored milk drinks to avoid the need to open the caps.

However, the show is involved in a major milk-wasting controversy when a video showing thousands of bottles of milk being bought up and then discarded by fans went viral on social media in May 2021. The video shows large amounts of milk was dumped into the drain after opening by some fans during Youth With You Season 2 because fans only needed the bottle caps for the QR codes. Nearly 270,000 bottles of the beverage were wasted in the video.

The act triggered massive criticism online. In light of China's recent legislation to ban food waste, state media outlets and government agencies criticized the milk-wasting behavior.

On 7 May 2021, iQiyi closed all the voting channels, and announced on social media that the finale is cancelled and postponed, as it reviews and adjusts the rules of the show.

=== Finale cancellation ===
After the milk-wasting controversy broke, the production of the finale scheduled on 8 May 2021 was suspended since 5 May 2021. In the afternoon of 6 May 2021, the eliminated trainees returned to Dachang, the filming site of Youth With You, for the finale rehearsal, but left the site that night.

On 7 May 2021, iQiyi closed all the voting channels, and announced that the finale is cancelled and postponed. The future of the finale remained unclear at that point, as to whether it would postponed, cancelled completely, or the filming site would be changed.

News broke out that the finale has been recorded low-key or rehearsed in the midnight of 8 May. The debut team is reportedly formed and the team name is rumoured to be "NINEVER", while the 9-member line-up is consist of Luo Yizhou, Jojo Tang Jiuzhou, Lian Huaiwei, Neil Liu Guanyou, Jerome Deng Xiaoci, Kachine Sun Yinghao, Liu Jun, X Duan Xingxing, Sun Yihang. The ranking is speculated to be without manipulation as the show is under pressure.

Meanwhile, on 8 May 2021, many of the top 19 trainees who are not in the debut team has left respectively.

However, on 9 May 2021, iQIYI and the management of Youth With You announced on Weibo that the finale was cancelled and denied that they have formed a debut team.
