= Smiley (EP) =

- Digital cover

EP by Yena
- Released: January 17, 2022
- Length: 16:36
- Language: Korean
- Label: Yuehua
- Producer: Pollock; Ollipop; Tobias Näslund; Kirubel Swedin

Yena chronology
| Smiley (2022) | Smartphone (2022) |

Singles from Smiley
- 1. "Smiley" Released: January 17, 2022

Smiley (stylised as ^{x}‿^{x} (SMiLEY)) is the debut extended play (EP) by South Korean singer Choi Ye-na. It was released on January 17, 2022, by Yuehua Entertainment.

== Background ==
From June 15 to August 31, 2018, Choi (together with Everglow members Kim Si-hyeon and Wang Yiren) represented Yuehua Entertainment on reality girl group survival show Produce 48. She eventually placed fourth and debuted with Iz*One. The group's debut extended play (EP) Color*Iz was released on October 29, 2018, with "La Vie en Rose" serving as its lead single. On April 29, 2021, Iz*One officially disbanded after the end of their contract.

On January 2, 2022, Yena announced the release date and schedule for her debut EP Smiley. A representative from her agency, Yuehua Entertainment shared:

Choi Ye Na had various positions in Iz*One, including lead vocal, lead dancer, and even rapper and continued that as she had prepared for her solo over a long time. Yena will now be starting her career in earnest as a singer who can show diverse forms of herself

== Track listing ==
Smiley track listing
| No. | Title | Lyrics | Music | Producer(s) | Length |
|---|---|---|---|---|---|
| 1. | "Before Anyone Else" | Yena; 72 | Yena; Pollock; Mayu Wakisaka; 72 | Pollock | 3:28 |
| 2. | "Smiley" (featuring Bibi) | TWLV; Bibi; Yena; 72 | Olof Lindskog; Gavin Jones; Hayley Aitken; TWLV; Bibi; 72 | Ollipop | 2:54 |
| 3. | "Lxxk 2 U" | Moon Da-eun (MUMW); Nam Hye-ju (MUMW); Yena; 72 | Pollock; Johnathan Sim; Mayu Wakisaka; Drew Louis; Jayelle; 72 | Ollipop | 3:03 |
| 4. | "Pretty Boys" | Ahn Young-joo (MUMW); Jo Ye-A (MUMW); Yena; 72 | Tobias Näslund; Kirubel Swedin; Jonna Hall; Maria Marcus | Tobias Näslund; Kirubel Swedin | 3:27 |
| 5. | "Vacay" | Kang Eun-jung; 72 | Pollock; Mayu Wakisaka; Drew Louis; Jayelle; 72 | Pollock | 3:47 |
| Total length: | | | | | 16:36 |

== Accolades ==
Music program awards
| Song | Program | Date | Ref. |
|---|---|---|---|
| "Smiley" | M Countdown (Mnet) | February 10, 2022 | |

== Charts ==
=== Weekly charts ===
Weekly chart performance for Smiley
| Chart (2022) | Peak position |
|---|---|
| Japan Hot Albums (Billboard Japan) | 48 |
| South Korean Albums (Gaon) | 2 |

=== Monthly charts ===
Monthly chart performance for Smiley
| Chart (2022) | Peak position |
|---|---|
| South Korean Albums (Gaon) | 14 |

== Release history ==
Release formats for Smiley
| Region | Date | Format | Distributor |
|---|---|---|---|
| Various | January 17, 2022 | Digital download; streaming | Yuehua |
| South Korea | January 17, 2022 | CD | Yuehua |
