= Hush (single album) =

Single album by Everglow
- Released: August 19, 2019
- Recorded: 2019
- Length: 9:02
- Language: Korean
- Label: Yuehua; Stone Music

Everglow chronology
Arrival of Everglow (2019)	Hush (2019)	Reminiscence (2020)

Singles from Hush
- 1. "Adios" Released: August 19, 2019

Hush (stylized as H:U:S:H) is the second single album by South Korean girl group Everglow. The album was released digitally and physically on August 19, 2019.

== Background and release ==
On August 4, it was revealed that Everglow would have their first comeback on August 19 with a second single album entitled Hush.

Concept images were released from August 6 to August 8. The tracklist was released on August 11, revealing three tracks: "Hush", title track "Adios", and "You Don't Know Me".

The music video teaser was released on August 14 and the full music video was released on August 19 altogether with the single release.

== Promotion ==
Everglow held a live showcase on August 19, where they performed "Adios" and "You Don't Know Me".

The group began promoting their title track, "Adios", on August 22. They first performed the lead single on Mnet's M Countdown, followed by performances on KBS' Music Bank, MBC's Show! Music Core and SBS' Inkigayo.

On September 24, 2019, Everglow won their first music program broadcast award on The Show.

== Commercial performance ==
Hush debuted at number five on the Gaon Album Chart. The songs "Adios", "Hush" and "You Don't Know Me" debuted at number 2, number 8 and respectively at number 10 on the Billboard World Digital Songs.

== Track listing ==
No.	Title	Lyrics	Music	Arrangement	Length
1.	"Hush"	Lee Bo-ra; 72	Melanie Fontana; Lena Leon; Michel "Lindgren" Schulz; 72	Lindgren	2:44
2.	"Adios"	Seo Ji-eum; 72	Olof Lindskog; Hayley Aitken; Gavin Jones; 72	Ollipop	3:09
3.	"You Don't Know Me"	Kang Jung-ah; 72	Olof Lindskog; Ludwig Lindell; Hayley Aitken; 72	Ollipop; Ludwig Lindell	3:09
Total length:					9:02

== Charts ==
Chart (2019)	Peak position
South Korean Albums (Gaon)	5

== Accolades ==
Year-end lists
Critic/Publication	List	Song	Rank	Ref.
Dazed	The 20 best K-pop songs of 2019	"Adios"	19	
BuzzFeed	30 best K-pop songs of 2019	"Adios"	5	
BuzzFeed	30 best K-pop music video of 2019	"Adios"	30	

=== Music program wins ===
Program	Date	Ref.
The Show (SBS MTV)	September 24, 2019	

== Release history ==
Region	Date	Format	Distributor
Various	August 19, 2019	Digital download; streaming	Yuehua; Stone Music
South Korea	August 19, 2019	Digital download; streaming	Yuehua; Stone Music
South Korea	August 19, 2019	CD	Yuehua; Stone Music
