= La De Da =

La De Da (spelled various ways) is a derisive term for pretentious refinement or affected gentility

La De Da (and variant spellings) may also refer to:

== Music ==
=== Songs ===
- "La De Da" (Ringo Starr song), 1998
- "La Di Da Di", a 1985 song by Doug E. Fresh
- "La Di Da" (Everglow song), 2020
- "My Heart Goes (La Di Da)", a 2021 song by Becky Hill and Topic
- La Di Da, a song by Lennon Stella
- "La de da de da de da de day oh", a 2018 song by Bill Wurtz
- "La Di Da", a song by The Internet

=== Albums ===
- La De Da (album), by Joel Plaskett
- Lah-Di-Dah, a 1991 album by Jake Thackray
- La Di Da Di, a 2015 album by Battles

=== Other ===
- La De Da (music festival), an annual music festival held in New Zealand
- The La De Da's, a New Zealand rock band
