= −77.82X−78.29 =

- Digital and −77.82X version cover

EP by Everglow
- Released: September 21, 2020
- Recorded: 2020
- Studio: Monotree Studio; Doobdoob Studio
- Genre: Synth-pop; electropop; dance-pop
- Length: 13:39
- Language: Korean
- Label: Yuehua; Stone Music
- Producer: Ollipop; David Anthony; David Amber; Glashausser; Lindgren; Storyboards

Everglow chronology
Reminiscence (2020)	−77.82X−78.29 (2020)	Last Melody (2021)

Singles from −77.82X−78.29
- 1. "La Di Da" Released: September 21, 2020

−78.29 version

−77.82X−78.29 (pronounced "negative seventy-seven point eight two by negative seventy-eight point two nine") is the second extended play and fourth release by South Korean girl group Everglow. It was released on September 21, 2020, by Yuehua Entertainment. It is available in two versions, −77.82X and −78.29, and contains four tracks, with "La Di Da" released as the lead single.

== Title ==
The album is titled −77.82X−78.29 after the coordinates of Antarctica, which is featured on the album cover. During the showcase for the album, member E:U was asked about it; she explained, "All the albums we have released so far convey the 'Everglow universe'. It'll be quite fun putting together these clues about our story. I can't tell you everything yet, but the upcoming stories are equally enjoyable [...]".

== Background ==
On September 7, 2020, Yuehua Entertainment revealed that Everglow would release their second EP titled −77.82X−78.29 on September 21.

Concept images came out between September 8–10. The tracklist was released on September 11, revealing four tracks: lead single "La Di Da", "Untouchable", "Gxxd Boy" and "No Good Reason"; the lyrics for "La Di Da" were co-written by member E:U.

The music video teaser for "La Di Da" was released on September 16, and the music video on September 21.

== Composition ==
According to Yuehua Entertainment, −77.82X−78.29 represents Everglow's "powerful and intense charisma", as compared to their previous works. The album is characterized by its bolder sound.

The lead single, "La Di Da", falls in the uptempo electropop and retro categories, and its lyrical content is a "warning" to the "haters who are pretending and full of dissatisfaction in [this] confusing era".

== Promotion ==
Everglow held a live showcase on September 21, where they performed "La Di Da" and "Untouchable".

The group started promoting "La Di Da" on September 24 at Mnet's M Countdown, followed by performances on KBS' Music Bank, MBC's Show! Music Core and SBS' Inkigayo.

They broke their first week's sales, with their album selling more than 25,000 copies.

== Track listing ==
−77.82X−78.29 track listing
No.	Title	Lyrics	Music	Arrangement	Length
1.	"La Di Da"	Lee Seu-ran; E:U	Hayley Aitken; Olof Lindskog; Gavin Jones; 72	Ollipop	3:30
2.	"Untouchable"	Lee Seu-ran; 72	David Anthony; Nermin Harambašić; Anne Judith Wik; Ronny Svendsen	David Anthony	3:10
3.	"Gxxd Boy"	JQ; Yoon Ye-ji (MUMW); J14	David Amber; Andy Love; Rebecca King; Dan Glashausser; Tom Glashausser	David Amber; Glashaus	3:23
4.	"No Good Reason"	Kang Eun-jeong; 72	Melanie Fontana; Michel "Lindgren" Schulz; James Abrahart; Storyboards; 72	Lindgren; Storyboards	3:36
Total length:					13:39

== Credits and personnel ==
Adapted from the album liner notes.

Musicians

- Everglow – vocals, gang vocals (track 1)
- Ollipop – drum programming (track 1), bass (track 1), synthesizer programming (track 1), keyboard (track 1)
- David Anthony – drum programming (track 2), bass programming (track 2), synthesizer programming (track 2), keyboard (track 2)
- David Amber – drum programming (track 3), bass programming (track 3), synthesizer programming (track 3), keyboard (track 3), vocal arrangement (track 3)
- Dan Glashausser – drum programming (track 3), bass programming (track 3), synthesizer programming (track 3)
- Lindgren – drum programming (track 4), bass (track 4), synthesizer programming (track 4), keyboard (track 4)
- Storyboards – bass (track 4), synthesizer programming (track 4), keyboard (track 4)
- Tom Glashausser – guitar (track 3)
- Hayley Aitken – vocal arrangement (track 1), gang vocals (track 1)
- Anne Judith Wik – vocal arrangement (track 2)
- Andy Love – vocal arrangement (track 3)
- Rebecca King – vocal arrangement (track 3)
- Melanie Fontana – vocal arrangement (track 4)
- Jeon Jae-hee (Jarry Potter) – background vocals (tracks 1,4)
- Sophia Pae – background vocals (track 2)
- Choi Young-kyung – background vocals (track 3)

Technical

- Ollipop – producer (track 1), digital editing (track 1)
- David Anthony – producer (track 2)
- David Amber – producer (track 3)
- Glashausser (duo) – producer (track 3)
- Lindgren – producer (track 4)
- Storyboards – producer (track 4)
- G-High – vocal directing (tracks 1,3,4)
- Kim Sung-pil – vocal directing (track 2)
- Kang Seon-young – recording (tracks 1,3,4), digital editing (tracks 1,3,4)
- Min Sung-soo – recording (track 2)
- Jang Woo-young – digital editing (track 2), mixing (track 2)
- Michael "Lindgren" Schulz – digital editing (track 4)
- Bob Horn – mixing (track 1)
- Anchor (Prismfilter) – mixing (track 3)
- Niera (Prismfilter) – mixing (track 3)
- Jung Yoo-ra – mixing (track 4)
- Kwon Nam-woo – mastering

Studios

- Monotree Studio – recording (tracks 1,3,4), digital editing (tracks 1,3,4)
- Doobdoob Studio – recording (track 2)
- Björk Studios – digital editing (track 1)
- MWF Hives – digital editing (track 2), mixing (track 2)
- The One with the Big Bulb – digital editing (track 4)
- The Echo Bar Recording Studios – mixing (track 1)
- Prismfilter Mixlab – mixing (track 3)
- 821 Sound – mastering

Publishing

- The Kennel AB – original publishing (track 1)
- The Key Artist Publishing – original publishing (tracks 1,2,4)
- EKKO Music Rights Europe – original publishing (track 2)
- Amberullo Publishing – original publishing (track 3)
- Love to Pub Publishing – original publishing (track 3)
- ThatGirl @17 – original publishing (track 3)
- Danophonic Music – original publishing (track 3)
- TGlass Music – original publishing (track 3)
- Universal Music Publishing – original publishing (track 4)
- Universal Music Publishing Korea – sub-publishing (track 1,4)
- The Key Artist Agency – sub-publishing
- Kobalt – sub-publishing (track 2)
- Musikade – sub-publishing (track 3)
- Warner Chappell Korea – sub-publishing (track 3)
- MusicCube – sub-publishing (track 3)

== Charts ==
Chart performance for −77.82X−78.29
Chart (2020)	Peak position
South Korean Albums (Gaon)	4

== Accolades ==
Year-end lists
Critic/Publication	List	Work	Rank	Ref.
Billboard	The 20 Best K-Pop Songs of 2020: Critics' Picks	"La Di Da"	1	
Dazed	The 40 Best K-pop Songs of 2020	"La Di Da"	4	
South China Morning Post	The Top 15 K-pop Albums of 2020	−77.82X−78.29	N/A	
Time	The Songs and Albums That Defined K-Pop's Monumental Year in 2020	"La Di Da"	N/A	
Paper	The 40 Best K-pop Songs of 2020	"La Di Da"	16	
MTV	The Best Kpop B-sides of 2020	"No Good Reason"	16	
BuzzFeed	The Best Kpop Songs of 2020	"La Di Da"	10	

== Release history ==
Release formats for −77.82X−78.29
Region	Date	Format	Distributor
Various	September 21, 2020	Digital download; streaming	Yuehua; Stone Music
South Korea	September 21, 2020	Digital download; streaming	Yuehua; Stone Music
South Korea	September 21, 2020	CD	Yuehua; Stone Music
