= Hayley Aitken =

Australian pop singer-songwriter

- Also known as: Hayley
- Born: Hayley Michelle Aitken; 11 April 1986 (age 40)
- Origin: Drouin, Victoria, Australia
- Genre: Pop
- Occupations: Singer, songwriter, record producer
- Instrument: Vocals
- Years active: 2001–present
- Labels: Jive/Zomba, Legit
- Formerly of: Scarlett Belle

Hayley Michelle Aitken (born 11 April 1986) is an Australian pop singer-songwriter and record producer who also performs mononymously as Hayley. She had a top 40 hit on the ARIA Singles Chart with her second single, "Kiss Me Quick" (July 2002). Aitken has worked as a songwriter or producer for other artists, and is a prolific producer for many K-pop artists.

== Biography ==
Hayley Aitken was born in April 1986 in the Victorian rural town of Drouin. In 1997 she recorded a song, "Another Tear", following the death of Princess Diana, which was written and produced by Reno Nicastro and Molly Meldrum.

Aitken's debut single, "That Girl", was released under her first name, Hayley, which reached the ARIA Singles Chart top 100 in July 2001. In the ARIA Report it was described as "a catchy urban pop single and features bonus dance remixes." It appeared on an Australian Promo CD for Britney Spears' single, "Stronger". Aitken was signed with Jive/Zomba.

Her second single, "Kiss Me Quick", under the name Hayley Aitken, peaked at No. 31 on the ARIA Singles Chart in August 2002. It contained a b-side, "If I Was to Say", which she wrote when eleven years old. Carmine Pascuzzi described "Kiss Me Quick", "[Aitken] is a teenager with loads of talent and this is an interesting modern pop song that showcases her talent. There is a distinctive confidence and depth in her performance and she delivers this song very positively."

Aitken's third single, "(I Hate the Way) I Love You", (December 2002), which peaked at No. 55. Also in 2002 she recorded a song for the Undercover Angels soundtrack, "[You Must Be An] Angel" Her proposed debut album, Watching TV, was pushed back several times, due to the sale of Zomba records to BMG Records, in 2003. Aitken signed to BMG records but asked to be released from her contract in 2004 so she could pursue her own direction. After her contract with Jive ended, she was signed by Legit music under a management contract by August 2004.

In 2005 Aitken worked as a songwriter, she co-wrote four tracks on Ricki-Lee Coulter's debut self-titled album (October: "Turn It Up", "Something About You", "Stay with Me" and "Hello". She also provided backing vocals for the latter three tracks. Legit Music stated that she was on their artist roster, however on Aitken's MySpace site, she placed her record label as "none". She was signed to Sony BMG publishing.

In 2007, Aitken, Tamara Jaber (ex-Scandal'us) and Reigan Derry (Australian Idol contestant, 2006) formed an all-girl pop trio, Scarlett Belle, and were signed to US label, Def Jam Recordings. In 2008 they were dropped from the label and shortly after Aitken left the group.

During the 2010s, Aitken has written or co-written material for other artists: September's "White Flag" on Love CPR (February 2011), "I Know You're not Alone" on Diamond Veil (May) by Sweetbox, Julie Bergan's "Fire" (June 2014), "Colours" on Eleven (October 2015) by Tina Arena and "Traffic Lights" (May 2015) on Lena's Crystal Sky. Also in 2015, while working in Swedish-based song writing collective, the Kennel, Aitken co-wrote "I Want Your Love" for Ukrainian-born artist, Eduard Romanyuta. "I Want Your Love" was the Moldovan entry for that year's Eurovision Song Contest. Aitken described her writing, "it has always been my dream to write music for different countries and cultures, so this is really cool."

== Discography ==
=== Singles ===
List of singles, with Australian chart positions
Title	Year	Peak chart positions
Title	Year	AUS
"That Girl"	2001	53
"Kiss Me Quick"	2002	31
"I Hate the Way I Love You"	2002	55

== Other work ==
Year	Label	Album	Artist	Song	Lyrics		Music	
Year	Label	Album	Artist	Song	Credited	With	Credited	With
2014	Jellyfish Entertainment	Error	VIXX	"After Dark"	No	Ryu Dasom (Jam Factory), Ravi	Yes	Andrew Choi, 220, Jake K
2014	SM Entertainment	Holler	Girls' Generation-TTS	"Stay"	No	Brian Kim	Yes	Caesar & Loui, Ollipop
2015	SM Entertainment	Ice Cream Cake	Red Velvet	"Ice Cream Cake"	No	Jo Yoon-kyung, Kim Dong-hyun	Yes	Sebastian Lundberg, Fredrik Haggstam, Johan Gustafson a.k.a. Trinity Music
2015	SM Entertainment	Ice Cream Cake	Red Velvet	"Stupid Cupid"	No	Sung Hyun-bin	Yes	Andrew Choi, 220, Cha Cha Malone
2016	SM Entertainment	Russian Roulette	Red Velvet	"Lucky Girl"	No	Kenzie	Yes	Ollipop
2016	Plan A Entertainment	Pink Revolution	Apink	"Boom Pow Love"	No	Beom & Nang, Chang Hye-won	Yes	Anne Judith Stokke Wik, Nermin Harambasic, Remee Jackson
2017	SM Entertainment	Don't Say No	Seohyun	"Love & Affection"	No	Seohyun	Yes	Johan Gustafsson, Fredrik Haggstam, Sebastian Lundberg, Lauren Dyson, Trinity
2017	Blockberry Creative	Choerry	Choerry	"Love Cherry Motion"	No	Hwang Hyun (MonoTree), Shin Agnes	Yes	Ollipop, Kanata Okajima
2017	SM Entertainment	Holiday Night	Girls' Generation	"All Night"	No	Kenzie	Yes	Ollipop, Daniel Caesar, Ludwig Lindell
2017	Blockberry Creative	Mix & Match	Loona Odd Eye Circle	"Odd"	No	G-high (MonoTree)	Yes	Ollipop
2017	Blockberry Creative	Mix & Match	Loona Odd Eye Circle	"Girl Front"	No	Park Ji-yeon, Hwang Hyun (MonoTree),	Yes	Ollipop
2017	Blockberry Creative	Max & Match	Loona Odd Eye Circle	"Odd Front"	No	Park Ji-yeon, Hwang Hyun (MonoTree)	Yes	Ollipop
2017	Blockberry Creative	Chuu	Chuu	"Heart Attack"	No	Hwang Hyun (MonoTree)	Yes	Ollipop
2018	JYP Entertainment	What Is Love?	Twice	"Dejavu"	No	Chloe	Yes	Jan Hallvard Larsen, Eirik Johansen, Anne Judith Stokke Wik, Ronny Vidar Svendsen, Nermin Harambašić (Dsign Music)
2018	n.CH Entertainment	Some & Love	Nature	"Some (You'll Be Mine)"	No	Sung Dan-young, Bang Hye-hyun, Lee Jung-hyun	Yes	Caesar & Loui, Ollipop
2019	Starship Entertainment	For the Summer	Cosmic Girls	"Oh My Summer"	No	JQ, Lee Ji-hye (makeumine works), Exy	Yes	Caesar & Loui, Ollipop
2019	Starship Entertainment	For the Summer	Cosmic Girls	"Sugar Pop"	No	Lovey, Exy	Yes	Caesar & Loui, Ollipop
2019	SM Entertainment	The Reve Festival: Day 1	Red Velvet	"Zimzalabim"	No	Lee Seu-ran	Yes	Caesar & Loui, Ollipop
2019	Yuehua Entertainment	Hush	Everglow	"Adios"	No	Lee Bo-ra, 72	Yes	Ollipop, Gavin Jones, 72
2019	Yuehua Entertainment	Hush	Everglow	"You Don't Know Me"	No	Kang Jung-ah, 72	Yes	Caesar & Loui, Ollipop, 72
2019	JYP Entertainment	Feel Special	Twice	"Feel Special"	No	J. Y. Park	Yes	J. Y. Park, Ollipop
2019	Blockberry Creative	[#]	Loona	"365"	No	Hwang Yu-bin	Yes	Johan Gustafsson, Realmeee
2020	ANS Entertainment	Say My Name	ANS	"Say My Name"	No	Eun Jong-tae, Oh Yu-won	Yes	Ollipop
2020	Yuehua Entertainment	Reminiscence	Everglow	"Salute"	No	Lee Seu-ran	Yes	Ollipop, Caesar & Loui, 72
2020	Yuehua Entertainment	Reminiscence	Everglow	"Dun Dun"	No	Seo Jieum	Yes	Ollipop, Gavin Jones, 72
2020	Yuehua Entertainment	Reminiscence	Everglow	"Player"	No	Lee Bo-ra	Yes	Ollipop, Ludwig Lindell, 72
2020	Yuehua Entertainment	Reminiscence	Everglow	"No Lie"	No	Lee Seu-ran	Yes	Ollipop, Gavin Jones, 72
2020	DSP Media	Red Moon	Kard	"Red Moon"	No	Kang Eun-jeong, BM	Yes	Ollipop, Gavin Jones, 72
2020	DSP Media	Red Moon	Kard	"Enemy"	No	Kang Eun-jeong, BM, J.Seph	Yes	Ollipop, 72
2020	Bridʒ Entertainment	Good Girl: Episode 2	Hyolyn	"9LIVES"	Yes	Ollipop, Gavin Jones, 72	Yes	Ollipop, Gavin Jones, 72
2020	Yuehua Entertainment	-77.82X-78.29	Everglow	"La Di Da"	No	Lee Seu-ran, E:U	Yes	Ollipop, Gavin Jones, 72
2021	JYP Entertainment	U	NiziU	"Poppin’ Shakin’"	No	Safari Natsuwaka	Yes	Lee Woo-min "Collapsedone", Ollipop
2021	Yuehua Entertainment	Last Melody	Everglow	"First"	No	Park Hee-ah, Yoo Ga-young, 72	Yes	Olof Lindskog, Gavin Jones, 72
2021	Yuehua Entertainment	Return of the Girl	Everglow	"Pirate"	No	Hong Yi-reum (Makeumine Works), 72	Yes	Olof Lindskog, Gavin Jones, 72
2022	Yuehua Entertainment	Smiley	Yena	"Smiley" (featuring Bibi)	No	TWLV, Bibi, Yena, 72	Yes	Olof Lindskog, Gavin Jones, TWLV, Bibi, 72
2022	Yuehua Entertainment	Smartphone	Yena	"Smartphone"	No	TWLV, Yena, 72	Yes	Ollipop, Gavin Jones, TWLV, 72
2022	JYP Entertainment	Celebrate	Twice	"Bitter Sweet"	No	Co-sho	Yes	Woo Min Lee "collapsedone, Ollipop, STWP
2022	JYP Entertainment	Non-album single	Itzy	"Boys Like You"	Yes	Didrik Thott, Sara Davis, Ellie Suh (153/Joombas), Lee Joo-hee (MUMW)	Yes	Didrik Thott, Sebastian Thott
