= La Di Da (Everglow song) =

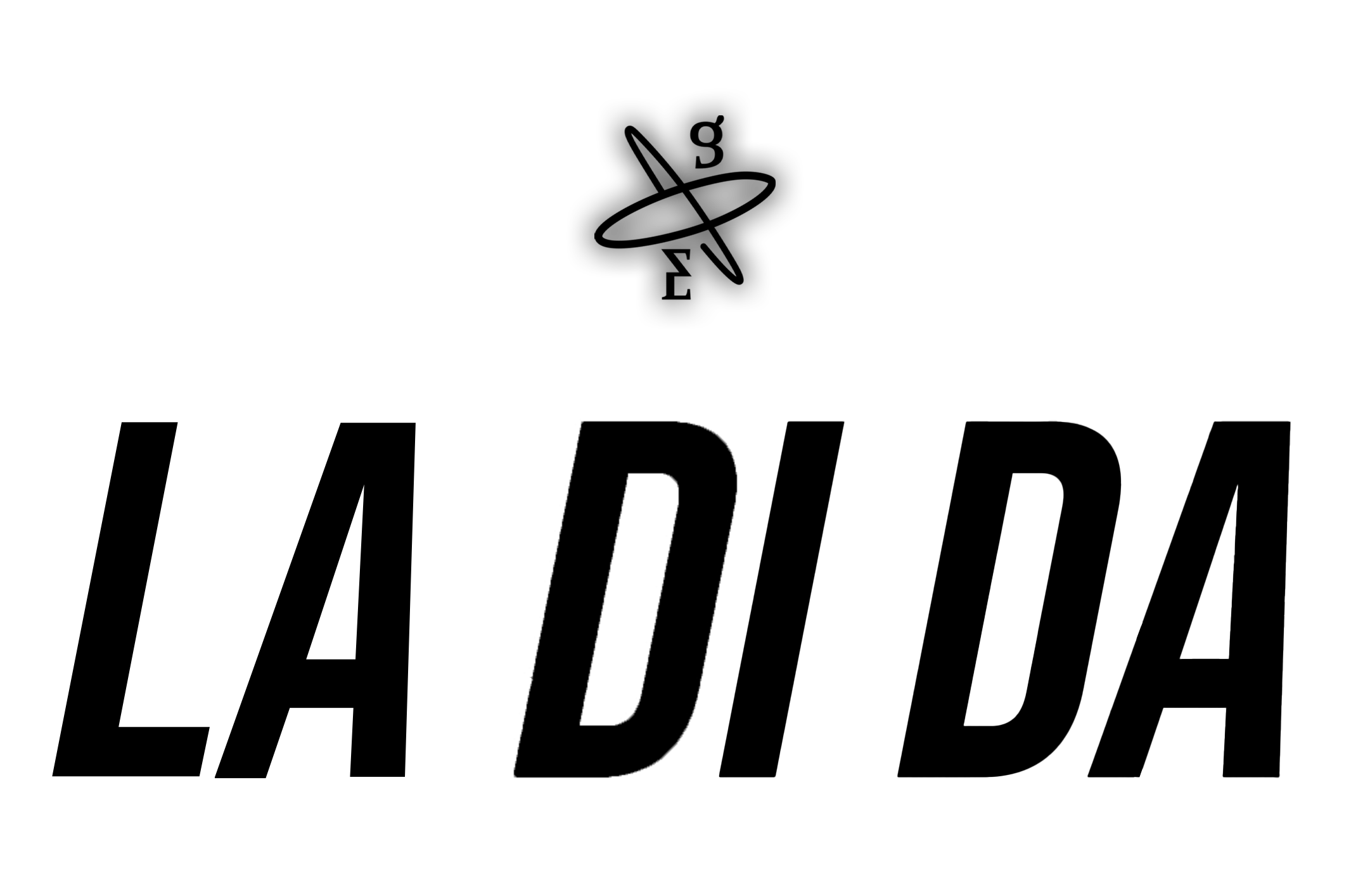

Single by Everglow

from the EP -77.82X-78.29
- Language: Korean
- Released: September 21, 2020
- Studio: Monotree Studio (Seoul)
- Genre: Synth-pop; electropop
- Length: 3:31
- Label: Yuehua; Stone Music
- Composers: Hayley Aitken; Olof Lindskog; Gavin Jones; 72
- Lyricists: Lee Seu-ran; E:U
- Producer: Ollipop

Everglow singles chronology
"Dun Dun" (2020)	"La Di Da" (2020)	"First" (2021)

Music video
- "La Di Da" on YouTube

"La Di Da" (stylized in all caps) is a song recorded by South Korean girl group Everglow for their second extended play -77.82X-78.29. It was released by Yuehua Entertainment on September 21, 2020, as the EP's lead single. It is a synth-pop-inspired song that delivers a dismissive message to haters. It was produced by Ollipop, with whom the group has been working since their debut, and co-written by member E:U. The song was named the best K-pop song of 2020 by Billboard on a year-end list.

== Background ==
On September 12, 2020, the group officially announced "La Di Da" and the other three tracks on the EP. The teaser for the single's music video and multiple concept photos were released on the group's official social media accounts, revealing the retro style of the comeback. In the showcase event for the EP's release, member Yiren said, "We tried a bolder and more unique performance…We also tried to expand Everglow's musical spectrum."

== Composition ==
"La Di Da" is a retro-inspired uptempo electropop song that combines various elements from the '80s, such as cheerleader chants and strong synthesizers. The lyrics have a strong sense of self-empowerment and sends a humbling message to the "bad guys" and the "players" (haters). The song was composed in the E♭ minor key with a tempo of 160 beats per minute.

== Promotion ==
Prior to the release of -77.82X-78.29, on September 21, Everglow held an online showcase event in order to introduce the EP and its songs, and to answer questions from the media, where they performed "La Di Da" live for the first time. On September 24, 2020, the group did their official comeback stage on M Countdown. They also performed the song on KBS2's Music Bank, MBC's Show! Music Core, SBS' Inkigayo, Arirang's Simply K-Pop, SBS' The Show, and MBC M's Show Champion.

== Credits and personnel ==
Song credits

- Everglow – vocals, gang vocals
  - E:U – lyricist
- Lee Seu-ran (이스란) – lyricist
- Hayley Aitken – composer, vocal arrangement, gang vocals
- Olof Lindskog (Ollipop) – composer, producer, drum programming, bass, synthesizer programming, keyboard, digital editing (at Björk Studios)
- Gavin Jones – composer
- 72 – composer
- Jeon Jae-hee (전재희) – background vocals
- G-High – vocal directing
- Kang Sun-young (강선영) – recording, digital editing (at Monotree Studio)
- Bob Horn – mixing (at The Echo Bar Recording Studios)
- Kwon Nam-woo (권남우) – mastering (at 821 Sound)

Visual credits

- Woogie Kim – music video directing
- Lia Kim (1 million) – choreography
- Kim Ji-hye (김지혜) – performance directing
- Park Joo-hee (박주희) – performance directing

== Charts ==
Weekly chart performance for "La Di Da"
Chart (2020)	Peak position
US World Digital Song Sales (Billboard)	5
South Korea Download (Circle)	138

== Accolades ==
Year-end lists
Critic/Publication	List	Rank	Ref.
Billboard	The 20 Best K-Pop Songs of 2020: Critics' Picks	1	
Dazed	The 40 Best K-pop Songs of 2020	4	
Time	The Songs and Albums That Defined K-Pop's Monumental Year in 2020	N/A	
Paper	The 40 Best K-pop Songs of 2020	16	
BuzzFeed	The Best Kpop Songs of 2020	10	
