= Return of the Girl =

- Digital cover

EP by Everglow
- Released: December 1, 2021
- Studios: Doobdoob Studio (Seoul); Monotree Studio (Seoul)
- Length: 16:35
- Language: Korean
- Labels: Yuehua; Stone Music
- Producers: Tobias Näslund; Ollipop; Ludwig Lindell

Everglow chronology
| Last Melody (2021) | Return of the Girl (2021) | All My Girls (2023) |

Singles from Return of the Girl
- 1. "Pirate" Released: December 1, 2021

Return of the Girl is the third extended play by South Korean girl group Everglow. The EP was released by Yuehua Entertainment on December 1, 2021, and contains five tracks, including the lead single "Pirate".

== Background and release ==
On November 15, 2021, Yuehua Entertainment announced Everglow would be releasing their third extended play titled Return of the Girl on December 1. A day later, the promotional schedule was released. On November 22, the track listing was released with "Pirate" announced as the lead single. On November 24, the music video teaser for "Pirate" was released. A day later, the highlight medley teaser video was released. On November 28, the choreography performance teaser video for "Pirate" was released.

== Commercial performance ==
Return of the Girl debuted at number ten on South Korea's Gaon Album Chart in the chart issue dated November 28 – December 4, 2021; on the monthly chart, the EP debuted at number 12 in the chart issue for December 2021 with 40,809 copies sold.

== Promotion ==
Prior to the extended play's release, on December 1, 2021, Everglow held a live showcase event online to introduce the EP and communicate with their fans. The group performed "Pirate" on various music shows, and made a special performance for "Don't Speak" at The Show.

== Track listing ==
Track listing for Return of the Girl
| No. | Title | Lyrics | Music | Arrangement | Length |
|---|---|---|---|---|---|
| 1. | "Back Together" | Yoo Ga-young; Lee Bo-ra; Kang Eun-jeong; 72 | Tobias Näslund; Sanna Martinez; Maria Marcus; 72 | Tobias Näslund | 3:59 |
| 2. | "Pirate" | Hong Yi-reum (Makeumine Works); 72 | Olof Lindskog; Gavin Jones; Hayley Aitken; 72 | Ollipop | 3:30 |
| 3. | "Don't Speak" | Lee Seu-ran; Lee Bo-ra; 72 | Olof Lindskog; Hayley Aitken; Ludwig Lindell; 72 | Ollipop; Ludwig Lindell | 3:27 |
| 4. | "Nighty Night" | Hong Yi-reum (Makeumine Works); Luke (Makeumine Works) | Olof Lindskog; Louise Frick Sveen; Gavin Jones; 72 | Ollipop | 2:42 |
| 5. | "Company" | Park Hee-ah; 72 | Christian Fast; Maria Marcus | | 2:57 |
| Total length: | | | | | 16:35 |

== Credits and personnel ==
Adapted from the album liner notes.

Musicians

- Everglow – vocals, gang vocals (track 2)
- Tobias Näslund – drum programming (track 1,5), bass (track 1,5), synthesizer programming (track 1,5), keyboard (track 5)
- Ollipop – drum programming (tracks 2,3,4), bass (tracks 2,3,4), synthesizer programming (tracks 2,3,4), keyboard (tracks 2,3,4), vocal arrangement (track 4)
- Ludwig Lindell – drum programming (track 3), bass (track 3), synthesizer programming (track 3), keyboard (track 3)
- Maria Marcus – piano (track 1), vocal arrangement (track 1,5), background vocals (track 5), gang vocals (track 5)
- Sanna Martinez – vocal arrangement (track 1), background vocals (track 1)
- Hayley Aitken – vocal arrangement (tracks 2,3), background vocals (track 2), gang vocals (tracks 2,3)
- Louise Frick Sveen – vocal arrangement (track 4), background vocals (track 4), gang vocals (track 4)
- Gavin Jones – vocal arrangement (track 4)
- Pae Su-jung (배수정; Sophia Pae) – background vocals (tracks 1,2,3)
- Rami Nu – background vocals (track 4)
- Janet Suhh – background vocals (track 5)

Technical

- Tobias Näslund – producer (tracks 1,5)
- Ollipop – producer (tracks 2,3,4), digital editing (track 2)
- Ludwig Lindell – producer (track 3)
- 72 – vocal directing (tracks 1,3,4,5)
- G-High – vocal directing (track 2)
- Jang Woo-young (장우영) – recording (tracks 1,3,4,5), digital editing (tracks 1,3,4,5), mixing (tracks 4,5)
- Kang Sun-young (강선영) – recording (track 2), digital editing (track 2)
- Jo Jun-sung (조준성) – mixing (track 1)
- Bob Horn – mixing (track 2)
- Jaime Velez – mixing (track 3)
- Kwon Nam-woo – mastering

Studios

- Doobdoob Studio – recording (tracks 1,3,4,5)
- Monotree Studio – recording (track 2), digital editing (track 2)
- MWF Hives – digital editing (tracks 1,3,4,5), mixing (tracks 4,5)
- Björk Studios – digital editing (track 2)
- WSound – mixing (track 1)
- The Echo Bar Recording Studios – mixing (track 2)
- Blackwood Studios – mixing (track 3)
- 821 Sound – mastering

Publishing

- Cosmos Music Publishing – original publishing (tracks 1,5)
- The Key Artist Publishing – original publishing
- The Key Artist Agency – original publishing (tracks 1,3,5), sub-publishing
- The Kennel AB – original publishing (tracks 2,3,4)
- Makeumine Works – original publishing (tracks 2,4)
- Fast Cut Music Publishing – original publishing (track 5)
- Iconic Sounds – sub-publishing (track 5)

== Charts ==
=== Weekly charts ===
Weekly chart performance for Return of the Girl
| Chart (2022) | Peak position |
|---|---|
| South Korean Albums (Gaon) | 10 |

=== Monthly charts ===
Monthly chart performance for Return of the Girl
| Chart (2022) | Peak position |
|---|---|
| South Korean Albums (Gaon) | 12 |

== Sales ==
Overall sales for Return of the Girl
| Region | Sales |
|---|---|
| South Korea | 46,015 |

== Release history ==
Release history for Return of the Girl
| Region | Date | Format | Label |
|---|---|---|---|
| South Korea | December 1, 2021 | CD | Yuehua; Stone Music |
| Various | December 1, 2021 | Digital download; streaming | Yuehua; Stone Music |
