= Zombie (Everglow song) =

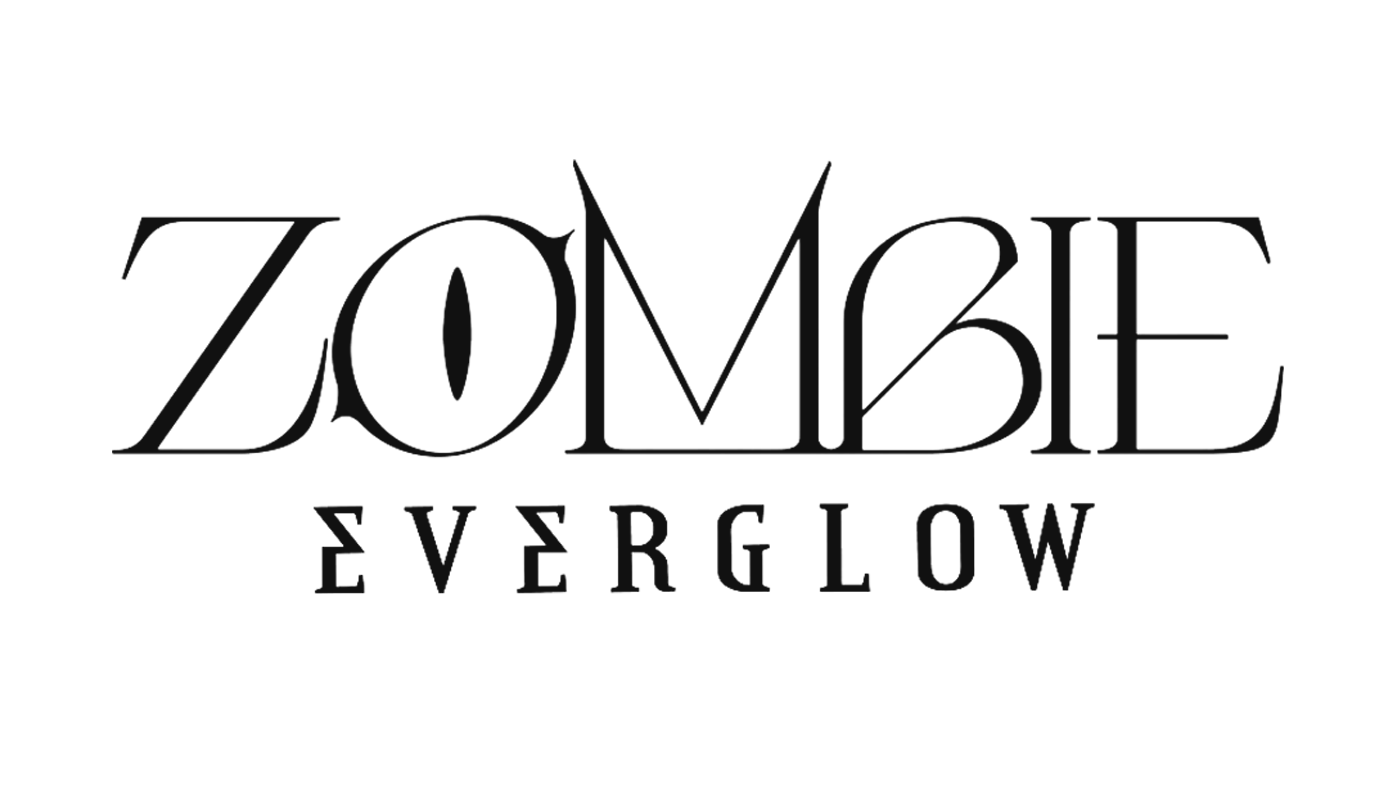
- Official logo

Single by Everglow

from the album Zombie
- Language: Korean
- Released: June 10, 2024
- Studio: Doob Doob Studio (Seoul)
- Genre: Hip hop
- Length: 3:19
- Label: Yuehua; Stone Music
- Composers: Ray Romulus; Jonathan Yap; Jeremy Reeves; Luke Milano; Jeff Baranowski
- Lyricists: Gina Kushka; Dalton Diehl; Ahn Young-joo (MUMW); Young (MUMW); Claire; 72
- Producers: The Stereotypes; 9am

Everglow singles chronology
"Slay" (2023)	"Zombie" (2024)

Music video
- "Zombie" on YouTube

"Zombie" is a song recorded by South Korean girl group Everglow for their fifth single album of the same name. It was released as the album's lead single by Yuehua Entertainment on June 10, 2024.

== Background and release ==
On May 20, 2024, Yuehua Entertainment announced that Everglow would be releasing their fifth single album titled Zombie on June 10. A day later, the promotional schedule was released. On May 29, the track listing was released with "Zombie" announced as the lead single. The music video teasers were released on June 3 and 4. On June 7, the highlight medley teaser video was released. The song was released alongside its music video and the single album on June 10.

== Composition ==
"Zombie" was written by Gina Kushka, Dalton Diehl, Ahn Young-joo (MUMW), Young (MUMW), Claire, and 72. It was composed by Ray Romulus, Jonathan Yip, and Jeremy Reeves from The Stereotypes, along with Luke Milano and Jeff Baranowski from 9am. The arrangement was handled by The Stereotypes and 9am. Described as a hip hop song with lyrics that "depicts the bittersweet emotions of being hurt by love". "Zombie" was composed in the key of E minor, with a tempo of 122 beats per minute.

== Promotion ==
Following the release of Zombie, on June 10, 2024, Everglow held a live showcase aimed at introducing the album and its tracks, including "Zombie", and connecting with their fanbase. They subsequently performed on six music programs: SBS M's The Show on June 11, MBC M's Show Champion on June 12, Mnet's M Countdown on June 13, and KBS's Music Bank on June 14, MBC's Show! Music Core on June 15, and SBS's Inkigayo on June 16.

== Credits and personnel ==
Adapted from the single album liner notes.

Studio

- Doob Doob Studio – recording
- MWF Hives – digital editing
- Six 1 Seven Studios – mixing
- Nooks and Crannies – mastering

Personnel

- Everglow – vocals
- Sophiae Pae – background vocals
- The Stereotypes – producer, drum programming, bass, guitar, synthesizer
  - Ray Romulus – composition, arrangement
  - Jonathan Yip – composition, arrangement
  - Jeremy Reeves – composition, arrangement
  - Ray Charles McCullough II – arrangement
- 9am – producer, drum programming, bass, guitar, synthesizer
  - Luke Milano – composition, arrangement
  - Jeff Baranowski – composition, arrangement
- Gina Kushka – lyrics, vocal arrangement
- Dalton Diehl – lyrics, vocal arrangement
- Ahn Young-joo (MUMW) – lyrics
- Young (MUMW) – lyrics
- Claire – lyrics
- 72 – lyrics, vocal directing
- Jang Woo-young – recording
- Woooooo0 – digital editing
- The Aaron Mattes – mixing
- Tiernan Cranny – mastering

== Charts ==
Chart performance for "Zombie"
Chart (2024)	Peak position
South Korea Download (Circle)	43

== Release history ==
Release history for "Zombie"
Region	Date	Format	Label
Various	June 10, 2024	Digital download; streaming	Yuehua; Stone Music
