= Choi Ye-na =

South Korean singer (born 1999)

- Choi in 2026
- Born: September 29, 1999 (age 27); Seoul, South Korea
- Education: Hanlim Multi Art School
- Occupations: Singer; actress
- Relatives: Choi Sung-min (brother)
- Musical career
- Genre: K-pop
- Instruments: Vocals; guitar
- Years active: 2018–present
- Labels: YH; Off the Record (Note: As a member of Iz*One only.); EMI; Dreamusic; Victor
- Formerly of: Iz*One

Korean name
- Hangul: 최예나
- RR: Choe Yena
- MR: Ch'oe Yena

Choi Ye-na (Korean: 최예나, born September 29, 1999), known mononymously as Yena, is a South Korean singer and actress. She is a soloist and actress under YH Entertainment, and a former member of South Korean–Japanese girl group Iz*One, having finished fourth on Mnet's reality girl group survival show Produce 48. Yena made her solo debut on January 17, 2022, with the release of her first EP Smiley.

== Early life ==
Choi was born on September 29, 1999, in Gil-dong, Gangdong, South Korea. She is the younger sister of singer and actor Choi Sung-min. As a child, she was diagnosed with lymphoma.

== Career ==
=== Pre-debut ===
Choi is a former Polaris Entertainment trainee before joining YH Entertainment. She was a host for SBS' Cooking Class in 2017.

=== 2018–2021: Produce 48, Iz*One, solo activities ===
Choi for Produce 48 in 2018

From June 15 to August 31, 2018, Choi (together with Everglow members Kim Si-hyeon and Wang Yiren) represented YH Entertainment on reality girl group survival show Produce 48. She eventually placed fourth and debuted with Iz*One. The group's debut extended play (EP) Color*Iz was released on October 29, 2018, with "La Vie en Rose" serving as its lead single.

Following her debut with Iz*One, Choi became a cast member for Prison Life of Fools, alongside Got7's JB, Jang Do-yeon, Jeong Hyeong-don and many more.

On December 21, 2020, Choi was announced as one of the cast members for mystery variety show Girls High School Mystery Class. The show is TVING's first original content variety show.

After Iz*One's disbandment in April 2021, Choi became a cast member of TVING's Idol Dictation Contest. She also joined the fixed MC panels for tvN Story's Fireworks Handsome and MBC's Game of Blood. On August 6, 2021, Choi was confirmed as the sole MC of Studio Waffle's web variety show Yena's Animal Detective. The web show started airing on August 24. Choi made her acting debut later that year portraying Oh Na-ri in the second season of the web series The World of My 17.

=== 2022–present: Solo debut ===
Choi in 2022

On January 1, 2022, Choi announced through her social media that she would make her solo debut with the EP Smiley on January 17. She made her broadcast debut on Mnet's M Countdown on January 20 performing "Smiley". On February 10, 2022, Choi earned her first ever music show win on Mnet's M Countdown. Choi released her second EP, Smartphone, on August 3.

In January 2023, Choi released a poster confirming her comeback with her first single album, Love War, on January 16. That month, she was also cast in the ENA variety show HMLYCP. Choi released her second single album Hate XX on June 27. The title track, "Hate Rodrigo", which Choi co-wrote, refers to American pop-singer Olivia Rodrigo, and the lyrics describe the concept of a "cute jealousy" towards Rodrigo, who is an object of envy and admiration. The music video for "Hate Rodrigo", posted on June 27, also prominently features images of Rodrigo. Two days after the music video was released, Yuehua Entertainment set the video to private to address "possible violations of trademark rights, portrait rights and copyright". The music video was later re-uploaded with significant edits, including the removal of "many shots that included posters of Rodrigo on the walls". In August 2023, Choi made her Japanese debut with the single "Smiley" (Japanese version), which featured Chanmina.

Choi during her Nemonemo showcase in 2024

On January 15, 2024, Choi released her third EP Good Morning. A second Japanese single, titled "DNA", was released on February 7. In September 2024, it was announced that Choi would be releasing her third single album Nemonemo on September 30. On December 18, it was announced that Choi would be returning to acting in the family sitcom Villains Everywhere.

On May 16, 2025, Choi was featured in BTS's Jin's song, "Loser" in the album Echo. Choi released her fourth EP Blooming Wings on July 29. Choi released the Japanese digital single "STAR!", featuring Vocaloid Hatsune Miku, on November 26, under Victor Entertainment.

Choi at the 2026 Korea Grand Music Awards

On January 21, 2026, Choi released the Japanese version of Nemonemo. Choi released her fifth EP Love Catcher on March 11. Choi released "사쿠란보" on November 17, 2026, a Korean remake of the original Japanese song, "Sakuranbo" by Ai Otsuka. The music video features Japanese J-Pop group Cutie Street.

== Discography ==
=== Extended plays ===
List of extended plays, showing selected details, selected chart positions, and sales figures
Title	Details	Peak chart positions			Sales
Title	Details	KOR	JPN Hot	SWE Phy.	Sales
Smiley	Released: January 17, 2022; Label: YH Entertainment; Formats: CD, digital download, streaming	2	48	—	KOR: 123,302
Smartphone	Released: August 3, 2022; Label: YH Entertainment; Formats: CD, digital download, streaming; Track listing: 1. "Make U Smile"; 2. "Smartphone"; 3. "WithOrWithOut"; 4. "Lemon-Aid"; 5. "U"	3	— (Note: Smartphone did not enter the Billboard Japan Hot Albums chart but it peaked at number 31 on the Download Albums chart.)	—	KOR: 138,339
Good Morning	Released: January 15, 2024; Label: YH Entertainment; Formats: CD, digital download, streaming; Track listing: 1. "Good Morning"; 2. "Good Girls in the Dark"; 3. "Damn U"; 4. "The Ugly Duckling"	2	— (Note: Good Morning did not enter the Billboard Japan Hot Albums chart but it peaked at number 70 on the Download Albums chart.)	—	KOR: 77,667
Blooming Wings	Released: July 29, 2025; Label: YH Entertainment; Formats: CD, digital download, streaming; Track listing: 1. "Drama Queen"; 2. "Being a Good Girl Hurts" (착하다는 말이 제일 싫어); 3. "Hello Goodbye" (안녕); 4. "As Long as It's Not You" (너만 아니면 돼); 5. "364"	10	— (Note: Blooming Wings did not enter the Billboard Japan Hot Albums chart but it peaked at number 73 on the Download Albums chart.)	—	KOR: 41,364
Love Catcher	Released: March 11, 2026; Label: YH Entertainment; Formats: CD, digital download, streaming; Track listing: 1. "Catch Catch" (캐치 캐치); 2. "Spring Fever" (봄이라서; featuring DinDin, Jung Hyung-don); 3. "Sticker" (스티커; featuring MRCH); 4. "April's Cat" (4월의 고양이); 5. "Question Marks" (물음표; featuring Paul Kim)	5	87	18	KOR: 59,180
"—" denotes releases that did not chart.

=== Single albums ===
List of single albums, showing selected details, selected chart positions, and sales figures
Title	Details	Peak chart positions	Sales
Title	Details	KOR	Sales
Love War	Released: January 16, 2023; Label: YH Entertainment; Formats: CD, digital download, streaming; Track listing: 1. "Intro; Love Is Over"; 2. "Wash Away"; 3. "Love War" (featuring Be'O)	6	KOR: 124,270
Hate XX	Released: June 27, 2023; Label: YH Entertainment; Formats: CD, digital download, streaming; Track listing: 1. "Bad Hobby"; 2. "Hate Rodrigo" (featuring Yuqi ((G)I-dle)); 3. "Wicked Love"	11	KOR: 101,297
Nemonemo	Released: September 30, 2024; Label: YH Entertainment; Formats: CD, digital download, streaming; Track listing: 1. "Nemonemo" (네모네모); 2. "Sugar" (설탕); 3. "That Was Love" (그건 사랑이었다고)	5	KOR: 48,009

=== Singles ===
List of singles, showing year released, selected chart positions, and name of the album
Title	Year	Peak chart positions					Sales	Album
Title	Year	KOR	KOR Hot	JPN	JPN Heat.	NZ Hot	Sales	Album
Korean
"Smiley" (featuring Bibi)	2022	8	9	—	9	—	—N/a	Smiley
"Smartphone"	2022	119	—	—	—	—	—N/a	Smartphone
"Love War" (featuring Be'O)	2023	71	—	—	—	—	—N/a	Love War
"Hate Rodrigo" (featuring Yuqi)	2023	117	—	—	—	—	—N/a	Hate XX
"Good Morning"	2024	178	—	—	—	—	—N/a	Good Morning
"Nemonemo" (네모네모)	2024	35	—	—	8	—	—N/a	Nemonemo
"Being a Good Girl Hurts" (착하다는 말이 제일 싫어)	2025	— (Note: "Being a Good Girl Hurts" did not enter the Circle Digital Chart, but it peaked at number 17 on the component Circle Download Chart.)	—	—	—	—	—N/a	Blooming Wings
"Catch Catch" (캐치 캐치)	2026	5	70	—	3	26	—N/a	Love Catcher
"Dime Girl" (보기 드문 여자) (featuring Nowimyoung)	2026	122	—	—	—	—	—N/a	Non-album single
Japanese
"Smiley" (Japanese version) (featuring Chanmina)	2023	—	—	10	12	—	JPN: 5,658 (phy.)	Non-album singles
"DNA"	2024	—	—	7	—	—	JPN: 4,016 (phy.)	Non-album singles
"Star!" (featuring Hatsune Miku)	2025	—	—	9	—	—	JPN: 4,196 (phy.)	Non-album singles
"Nemonemo" (Japanese version)	2026	—	—	9	—	—	JPN: 4,196 (phy.)	Non-album singles
"Mirror Mirror" (ミラミラ)	2026	—	—	9	—	—	JPN: 4,196 (phy.)	Non-album singles
"—" denotes a recording that did not chart or was not released in that territory.

=== Production credits ===
All song credits are adapted from the Korea Music Copyright Association's database unless stated otherwise.

Title	Year	Artist	Album	Lyrics	Music
"With*One"	2020	Iz*One	Oneiric Diary	Yes	No
"Lesson"	2021	Iz*One	Non-album single	No	Yes
"Before Anyone Else"	2022	Choi Ye-na	Smiley	Yes	Yes
"Smiley"	2022	Choi Ye-na	Smiley	Yes	No
"Lxxk 2 U"	2022	Choi Ye-na	Smiley	Yes	No
"Pretty Boys"	2022	Choi Ye-na	Smiley	Yes	No
"Make U Smile"	2022	Choi Ye-na	Smartphone	Yes	No
"Smartphone"	2022	Choi Ye-na	Smartphone	Yes	No
"WithOrWithOut"	2022	Choi Ye-na	Smartphone	Yes	Yes
"Wash Away"	2023	Choi Ye-na	Love War	Yes	Yes
"Love War"	2023	Choi Ye-na	Love War	Yes	Yes
"Hate Rodrigo"	2023	Choi Ye-na	HATE XX	Yes	Yes
"Smiley -Japanese Ver.-"	2023	Choi Ye-na	Smiley -Japanese Ver.-	Yes	No
"Good Morning"	2024	Choi Ye-na	Good Morning	Yes	Yes
"The Ugly Duckling"	2024	Choi Ye-na	Good Morning	Yes	Yes
"Being a Good Girl Hurts"	2025	Choi Ye-na	Blooming Wings	Yes	No
"Hello Goodbye"	2025	Choi Ye-na	Blooming Wings	Yes	No
"Being a Good Girl Hurts (Chinese Ver.)"	2025	Choi Ye-na	Non-album single	Yes	No

== Videography ==
=== Music videos ===
Title	Year	Director(s)	Ref.
"Smiley" (featuring Bibi)	2022	Kim Zi-yong (FANTAZYLAB)	
"Smartphone"	2022	Kwon Yong-soo (Studio Saccharin)	
"With or Without (Performance Video)	2022	Kwon Yong-soo (Studio Saccharin)	
"Love War" (featuring Be'O)	2023	Soze Yoon (Studio GA•ZE)	
"Wicked Love"	2023	Song Jung-hwan	
"Hate Rodrigo" (featuring Yuqi)	2023	Kim Zi-yong (FANTAZYLAB)	
"Smiley" (Japanese version) (featuring Chanmina)	2023	Unknown	
"Good Morning"	2024	Kim Zi-yong (FANTAZYLAB)	
"DNA"	2024	Naive	
"Nemonemo" (네모네모)	2024	Yang Soonsik	
"Being a Good Girl Hurts" (착하다는 말이 제일 싫어)	2025	Jan Lee	
"Star" (featuring Hatsune Miku)	2025	Hong Seok Zoo	
"Catch Catch" (캐치 캐치)	2026	Jooyeong Yun (EARTHLUK)	
"Mirror Mirror"	2026	Anderson	
"Dime Girl" (featuring NowImYoung)	2026	Unknown	
"사쿠란보" (featuring Cutie Street)	2026	Unknown	

== Filmography ==
=== Television series ===
Year	Title	Role	Notes	Ref.
2025	Villains Everywhere	Gu Won-hee	Sitcom	

=== Web series ===
Year	Title	Role	Notes	Ref.
2021	The World of My 17	Oh Na-ri	Season 2	

=== Television shows ===
Year	Title	Role	Ref.
2017	Cooking Class	Host	
2018	Produce 48	Contestant	
2019	Prison Life of Fools	Cast member	
2021	Fireworks Handsome	Host	
2021	Game of Blood	Host	
2022	New Festa	Participant	
2022	Fantastic Family	Panelist	
2022	Family Register Mate	Special member	
2022	Is the parting will be a recall?	Judge	
2023	M Countdown	Special host	
2023	Webtoon Singer	Panelist	
2023	HMLYCP	Cast member	
2023	Girls Night Out	Host	
2026	My Remaining Love (working title)	Cast member	

=== Web shows ===
Year	Title	Role	Notes	Ref.
2021	Girls High School Mystery Class	Cast member	Episode 1–16 / Season 1	
2021	Yena's Animal Detective	Host		
2021–2022	Idol Dictation Contest	Cast member	DoReMi Market spin-off / Season 1–2	
2021–2024	Girls High School Mystery Class	Cast member	Season 1–3	
2022	The Door: To Wonderland	Cast member	Season 2	

=== Radio shows ===
Year	Title	Role	Notes	Ref.
2022	Idol Radio 2	Temporary DJ	June 23 – July 30	

== Awards and nominations ==
Name of the award ceremony, year presented, award category, nominee(s) of the award, and the result of the nomination
Award ceremony	Year	Category	Nominee(s)	Result	Ref.
Asia Artist Awards	2022	Best Musician Award	Choi Ye-na	Won	
Asia Artist Awards	2025	Best Musician – Solo	Choi Ye-na	Won	
Blue Dragon Series Awards	2022	Best New Female Entertainer	Girls High School Mystery Class	Nominated	
Brand Customer Loyalty Award	2021	Best Female Idol Entertainer	Choi Ye-na	Won	
Brand Customer Loyalty Award	2022	Best Rookie Female Singer	Choi Ye-na	Won	
Brand Customer Loyalty Award	2022	Best Female Idol Entertainer	Choi Ye-na	Won	
Brand Customer Loyalty Award	2023	Most Influential Female Solo Artist	Choi Ye-na	Won	
Brand Customer Loyalty Award	2023	Most Influential Female Entertainer Idol	Choi Ye-na	Won	
Brand of the Year Awards	2021	Entertainer Idol of the Year (Female)	Choi Ye-na	Nominated	
Brand of the Year Awards	2022	Best Rookie Solo Artist	Choi Ye-na	Won	
Brand of the Year Awards	2026	Best Female Solo Artist	Choi Ye-na	Won	
Circle Chart Music Awards	2023	New Icon of the Year	Choi Ye-na	Won	
Circle Chart Music Awards	2023	Song of the Year – January	"Smiley" (feat. Bibi)	Nominated	
Genie Music Awards	2022	Best Female Solo Artist	Choi Ye-na	Nominated	
Golden Disc Awards	2023	Digital Song Bonsang	"Smiley" (feat. Bibi)	Nominated	
Golden Disc Awards	2023	Rookie Artist of the Year	Choi Ye-na	Nominated	
Hanteo Music Awards	2023	Trend Wannabe Icon Award	Choi Ye-na	Won	
Korea First Brand Awards	2023	Most Anticipated Female Solo Artist	Choi Ye-na	Won	
MAMA Awards	2022	Best New Female Artist	Choi Ye-na	Nominated	
MAMA Awards	2022	Worldwide Fans' Choice Top 10	Choi Ye-na	Nominated	
MAMA Awards	2022	Artist of the Year	Choi Ye-na	Longlisted	
MAMA Awards	2022	Song of the Year	"Smiley" (feat. Bibi)	Longlisted	
MAMA Awards	2022	Best Dance Performance – Solo	"Smiley" (feat. Bibi)	Nominated	
Melon Music Awards	2022	Best Female Solo Artist	Choi Ye-na	Nominated	
Melon Music Awards	2022	Top 10 Artist Award	Choi Ye-na	Nominated	
Melon Music Awards	2022	Artist of the Year	Choi Ye-na	Longlisted	
Melon Music Awards	2026	Best Female Solo Artist	Choi Ye-na	Won	
