= Zombie (single album) =

- Digital cover

Single album by Everglow
- Released: June 10, 2024
- Studio: Doob Doob Studio
- Length: 9:45
- Language: Korean; English
- Label: Yuehua; Stone Music
- Producer: The Stereotypes; 9am; Bangkok

Everglow chronology
All My Girls (2023)	Zombie (2024)	Code (2026)

Singles from Zombie
- 1. "Zombie" Released: June 10, 2024

Zombie is the fifth single album by South Korean girl group Everglow. It was released by Yuehua Entertainment on June 10, 2024, and contained three tracks including the lead single of the same name.

== Background and release ==
On May 2, 2024, at their [All My Girls] concert in Tokyo, the members of Everglow said, "We are working hard on our comeback preparations, please look forward to seeing a side of us that we've never shown before". On May 20, Everglow announced the release of their fifth single album, Zombie, on June 10. A day later, the promotional schedule was released. On May 29, the track listing was released with "Zombie" announced as the lead single. The music video teasers for "Zombie" were released on June 3 and 4. On June 7, the highlight medley teaser video was released. The single album was released alongside the music video for "Zombie" on June 10.

== Promotion ==
Following the release of Zombie, on June 10, 2024, Everglow held a live showcase aimed at introducing the album and its tracks, and connecting with their fanbase.

== Track listing ==
Track listing for Zombie
No.	Title	Lyrics	Music	Arrangement	Length
1.	"Zombie"	Gina Kushka; Dalton Diehl; Ahn Young-joo (MUMW); Young (MUMW); Claire; 72	Ray Romulus; Jonathan Yip; Jeremy Reeves; Luke Milano; Jeff Baranowski	The Stereotypes; 9am	3:19
2.	"Colourz"	Young (MUMW); 72	David Anthony; Anna Timgren; 72	Bangkok	3:08
3.	"Back 2 Luv"	Young (MUMW); 72	David Anthony; Julia Bognar Finnseter (Blueprint); 72	Bangkok	3:18
Total length:					9:45

== Credits and personnel ==
Adapted from the single album liner notes.

=== Musicians ===
- Everglow – lead vocals
- Sophia Pae – backing vocals (all tracks)
- The Stereotypes – producer, drum programming, bass, guitar, synthesizer (track 1)
- 9am – producer, drum programming, bass, guitar, synthesizer (track 1)
- Gina Kushka – vocal arrangement (track 1)
- Dalton Diehl – vocal arrangement (track 1)
- 72 – vocal directing (all tracks)
- Bangkok – producer, drums, bass, guitar, synthesizer, keyboard (tracks 2 and 3)
- Anna Timgren – vocal arrangement (tracks 2 and 3)

=== Technicians ===
- Jang Woo-young – recording (all tracks)
- Woooooo0 – digital editing (all tracks)
- The Aaron Mattes – mixing (track 1)
- Tiernan Cranny – mastering (track 1)
- Bangkok – mixing (tracks 2 and 3)
- Kwon Nam-woo – mastering (tracks 2 and 3)

Studio

- Doob Doob Studio – recording (track 1)
- MWF Hives – digital editing (track 1)
- Six 1 Seven Studios – mixing (track 1)
- Nooks and Crannies – mastering (track 1)
- 821 Sound Mastering – mastering (tracks 2 and 3)

== Charts ==
=== Weekly charts ===
Weekly chart performance for Zombie
Chart (2024)	Peak position
South Korean Albums (Circle)	9

=== Monthly charts ===
Monthly chart performance for Zombie
Chart (2024)	Peak position
South Korean Albums (Circle)	29

== Release history ==
Release history for Zombie
Region	Date	Format	Label
South Korea	June 10, 2024	CD	Yuehua; Stone Music
Various	June 10, 2024	Digital download; streaming	Yuehua; Stone Music
