= Catch Catch =

2026 single by Choi Ye-na

- Chinese version cover

Single by Choi Ye-na

from the EP Love Catcher
- Language: Korean
- Released: March 11, 2026
- Genre: Electropop
- Length: 3:00
- Label: YH
- Composers: Nathan; Roar; Myrhee (644ultramarine); Coll's 8va (644ultramarine); Skinner Box; Jinli (Full8loom); Youra (Full8loom)
- Lyricists: Seo Jeong-ah; Nathan
- Producers: Nathan; Roar

Choi Ye-na singles chronology
"Star!" (2025)	"Catch Catch" (2026)	"Mirror Mirror" (2026)

Music video
- "Catch Catch" on YouTube

"Catch Catch" (Korean: 캐치 캐치) is a song recorded by South Korean singer Choi Ye-na for her fifth extended play, Love Catcher. It was released as the EP's lead single by YH Entertainment on March 11, 2026. The song was a commercial success, peaking at number 5 on the Circle Digital Chart and making it Choi's highest-charting song to date.

== Background and release ==
On February 23, 2026, it was announced that Choi would come back on March 11 with her fifth extended play, Love Catcher, with the release of a teaser photo and promotional schedule. On March 10, the music video teaser for the song was released. The song was released alongside its music video on March 11, upon the release of the extended play. A sped up and Chinese version of the song were released on March 17 and April 25, respectively.

== Composition ==
"Catch Catch" was written by Seo Jeong-ah and Nathan, composed by Nathan, Roar, Myrhee (644ultramarine), Coll's 8va (644ultramarine), Skinner Box, Jinli (Full8loom), and Youra (Full8loom), with the production and arrangement were handled by Nathan and Roar. It is described as an upbeat electropop song that incorporates a catchy hook with playful energy. Choi explained the song was heavily inspired by second-generation K-pop, both in its sound and performance. To get ready for the comeback, she watched videos and performances from girl groups such as T-ara and Orange Caramel in hopes to recreating that vibe in her own style.

== Commercial performance ==
Upon its release, "Catch Catch" did not enter the Circle Digital Chart but it appeared at number 9 on the component Download Chart for the week ending March 14, 2026. The following week, the song debuted at number 109 on the Circle Digital Chart and gradually climbed to number 5 for the week ending May 30, becoming Choi's highest placement to date on the chart, surpassing her debut single "Smiley", which peaked at number 8 in 2022. The song also peaked at number 70 on the short-lived Billboard Korea Hot 100 chart. Outside of Korea, the song peaked at number 3 on the Billboard Japan Heatseekers Songs chart in Japan, number 26 on the Hot Singles chart in New Zealand, and at number 25 on the Billboard Vietnam Hot 100.

== Credits and personnel ==
Credits adapted from Melon and the EP's liner notes.

Studio

- Den Studio – recording, digital editing
- MWF Hives – digital editing
- Stay Tuned Studio – mixing
- 821 Sound – mastering

Personnel

- Choi Ye-na – vocals
- Seo Jeong-ah – lyrics
- Nathan – producer, lyrics, composition, arrangement, vocal directing, drums, bass, synthesizer, programming, recording, digital editing
- Roar – producer, composition, arrangement, drums, bass, synthesizer, programming
- Myrhee (644ultramarine) – composition
- Coll's 8va (644ultramarine) – composition
- Skinner Box – composition
- Jinli (Full8loom) – composition
- Youra (Full8loom) – composition
- Kwon Ae-jin – background vocals
- Woooooo0 – digital editing
- Stay Tuned – mixing
- Kwon Nam-woo – mastering

== Charts ==
=== Weekly charts ===
Chart performance for "Catch Catch"
Chart (2026)	Peak position
Japan Heatseekers Songs (Billboard Japan)	3
New Zealand Hot Singles (RMNZ)	26
South Korea (Circle)	5
South Korea Hot 100 (Billboard)	70
Vietnam Hot 100 (Billboard)	25

=== Monthly charts ===
Monthly chart performance for "Catch Catch"
Chart (2026)	Position
South Korea (Circle)	7

== Release history ==
Release dates and formats
Region	Date	Format(s)	Version	Label	Ref.
Various	March 11, 2026	Digital download; streaming	Original	YH Entertainment	
Various	March 17, 2026	Digital download; streaming	Sped up version	YH Entertainment	
Various	April 25, 2026	Digital download; streaming	Chinese version	YH Entertainment	
