= All My Girls (single album) =

- Digital cover

Single album by Everglow
- Released: August 18, 2023
- Studio: Doob Doob Studio
- Genre: K-pop
- Length: 9:52
- Language: Korean; English
- Label: Yuehua; Stone Music
- Producer: Bangkok; Tobias Näslund; Lindgren

Everglow chronology
Return of the Girl (2021)	All My Girls (2023)	Zombie (2024)

Singles from All My Girls
- 1. "Slay" Released: August 18, 2023

All My Girls is the fourth single album by South Korean girl group Everglow. It was released by Yuehua Entertainment on August 18, 2023, and contains three tracks, including the lead single "Slay".

== Background and release ==
On July 26, 2023, Yuehua Entertainment announced Everglow would be releasing new music on August 18. A day later, it was announced they would be releasing their fourth single album titled All My Girls, with the promotional schedule was also released in the same day. On August 3, the track listing was released with "Slay" announced as the lead single. The music video teaser for "Slay" showcasing individual members was released from August 7 to 12. On August 14, the music video teaser for "Slay" showcasing the entire group was released. Two days later, the highlight medley teaser video was released. The single album was released alongside the music video for "Slay" on August 18.

== Commercial performance ==
All My Girls debuted at number 13 on South Korea's Circle Album Chart in the chart issue dated August 13–19, 2023.

== Promotion ==
Prior to the release of All My Girls, on August 18, 2023, the group held a live event to introduce the single album and its songs, and to communicate with their fans. After participating in various music programs and festivals, Everglow embarked on their second concert tour, named after the single album. The tour consisted of three legs: the first leg spanned ten stops across the United States and one in Mexico City from November 1 to 26, 2023; the second leg included six concerts in different European cities from January 23 to February 4, 2024; and the third leg featured two sold-out concerts in Tokyo and Osaka on April 29 and May 1, 2024. Midway through the tour, Everglow held their first fan-meeting on January 13, 2024 in Hong Kong.

== Track listing ==
Track listing for All My Girls
No.	Title	Lyrics	Music	Arrangement	Length
1.	"Slay"	Ji Su-jeong (MUMW); Andy Love; Lauren Dyson; 72	David Anthony; Andy Love; Lauren Dyson; 72	Bangkok	3:41
2.	"Oh Ma Ma God"	E:U; Sohlhee; Young (MUMW); Newny (MUMW); 72	Malin Johansson; Maria Marcus; Tobias Näslund	Tobias Näslund	3:09
3.	"Make Me Feel"	Melanie Fontana; Michel "Lindgren" Schulz; Casey Smith; 72	72	Michel "Lindgren" Schulz	3:02
Total length:					9:52

== Credits and personnel ==
Adapted from the album liner notes.

=== Musicians ===
- Everglow – lead vocals
- Bangkok – drum programming (track 1), bass (1), synthesizer programming (1), keyboard (1)
- Tobias Näslund – drum programming (track 2), bass (2), synthesizer programming (2), keyboard (2)
- Lindgren – drum programming (track 3), bass (3), synthesizer programming (3), keyboard (3), guitar (3)
- Andy Love – vocal arrangement (track 1)
- Maria Marcus – vocal arrangement (track 2), backing vocals (2)
- Melanie Fontana – vocal arrangement (track 3)
- Sophia Pae – backing vocals (track 1)
- Lauren Dyson – backing vocals (track 1)
- Claire – backing vocals (tracks 2, 3)
- Malin Johansson – backing vocals (track 2)
- 72 – backing vocals (track 2)
- Melanie Fontana – backing vocals (track 3)

=== Technical ===
- Bangkok – producer (track 1)
- Tobias Näslund – producer (track 2), mixing (2)
- Lindgren – producer (track 3)
- 72 – vocal directing (all tracks)
- Jang Woo-young – recording (all tracks)
- Woooooo0 – digital editing (all tracks)
- Jaime Velez – mixing (track 1)
- Curtis Douglas – mixing (track 3)
- Kwon Nam-woo – mastering (all tracks)

=== Studios ===
- DoobDoob Studio – recording (all tracks)
- MWF Hives – digital editing (all tracks)
- Blackwood Studios – mixing (track 1)
- Tobias Studio – mixing (track 2)
- Kapax Studios – mixing (track 3)
- 821 Sound – mastering (all tracks)

=== Publishing ===
- Ekko – publishing (track 1)
- THG Publishing – publishing (track 1)
- The Key Artist Agency – publishing (all tracks)
- Cosmos Music – publishing (track 2)
- Makeumine Works – publishing (track 2)
- Universal Music – publishing (track 3)
- Sony Music – publishing (track 3), sub-publishing (1)
- Universal Music Korea – sub-publishing (all tracks)

== Charts ==
=== Weekly charts ===
Weekly chart performance for All My Girls
Chart (2023)	Peak position
South Korean Albums (Circle)	13

=== Monthly charts ===
Monthly chart performance for All My Girls
Chart (2023)	Position
South Korean Albums (Circle)	41

== Release history ==
Release history for All My Girls
Region	Date	Format	Label
South Korea	August 18, 2023	CD	Yuehua; Stone Music
Various	August 18, 2023	Digital download; streaming	Yuehua; Stone Music
