= Last Melody =

- Cover for digital and physical release

Single album by Everglow
- Released: May 25, 2021
- Genre: K-pop
- Length: 11:02
- Language: Korean
- Label: Yuehua; Stone Music

Everglow chronology
| −77.82X−78.29 (2020) | Last Melody (2021) | Return of the Girl (2021) |

Singles from Last Melody
- 1. "First" Released: May 25, 2021

Last Melody is the third single album by South Korean group Everglow. It was released by Yuehua Entertainment on May 25, 2021, and consists of three tracks.

== Background and release ==
On May 6, 2021, Yuehua Entertainment announced that Everglow would be releasing a single album in May 25. On May 17, the track listing was released. A day later, the teaser video was released. On May 21, the medley video was released. The album was released on May 25 together with the music video for lead single "First".

== Commercial performance ==
Last Melody debuted and peaked at position 4 on South Korea's Gaon Album Chart in the chart issue dated May 23–29, 2021.

== Promotion ==
Following the release of the album, the group performed lead single "First" on six music programs: Mnet's M Countdown on May 27, KBS2's Music Bank on May 28, MBC's Show! Music Core on May 29, SBS's Inkigayo on May 30, and SBS MTV's The Show on June 1 where they won the first place, and MBC's Show Champion on June 2.

== Track listing ==
Track listing for Last Melody
| No. | Title | Lyrics | Music | Arrangement | Length |
|---|---|---|---|---|---|
| 1. | "First" | Park Hee-ah; Yoo Ga-young; 72 (lyrical station no_9) | Hayley Aitken; Olof Lindskog; Gavin Jones; 72 (lyrical station no_9) | Ollipop | 3:32 |
| 2. | "Don't Ask Don't Tell" | Lee Seu-ran; 72 (lyrical station no_9) | Melanie Fontana; Michel "Lindgren" Schulz; Mario Marchetti; Gino Barletta; 72 (lyrical station no_9) | Lindgren | 3:28 |
| 3. | "Please Please" | Lee Bo-ra; Yoo Ga-young; 72 (lyrical station no_9) | Lukas Hällgren; Jon Hällgren; Maria Marcus | Maria Marcus | 4:01 |
| Total length: | | | | | 11:02 |

== Accolades ==
Music program
| Program | Date | Ref. |
|---|---|---|
| The Show (SBS MTV) | June 1, 2021 | |

== Charts ==
Chart performance for Last Melody
| Chart (2021) | Peak position |
|---|---|
| South Korean Albums (Gaon) | 4 |

== Release history ==
Release history for Last Melody
| Region | Format | Labels |
|---|---|---|
| Various | Digital download; streaming | Yuehua; Stone Music |
| South Korea | CD | Yuehua; Stone Music |
