= Reminiscence (EP) =

EP by Everglow
- Released: February 3, 2020
- Recorded: 2019
- Studio: Doobdoob Studio (Seoul)
- Genre: EDM; dance-pop; electropop; tropical house
- Length: 13:12
- Language: Korean
- Label: Yuehua; Stone Music
- Producer: Ollipop; Caesar & Loui; Ludwig Lindell

Everglow chronology
Hush (2019)	Reminiscence (2020)	−77.82X−78.29 (2020)

Singles from Reminiscence
- 1. "Dun Dun" Released: February 3, 2020

Reminiscence (stylized as reminiscence) is the first extended play by South Korean girl group Everglow under Yuehua Entertainment. The EP was released on February 3, 2020, together with its lead single, "Dun Dun".

== Background ==
On January 20, 2020, Yuehua Entertainment revealed that Everglow will release their very first EP titled Reminiscence.

Concept images were released between January 22–24. The tracklist was released on January 25, revealing four tracks: "Salute", lead single "Dun Dun", "Player" and "No Lie".

The music video teaser for "Dun Dun" was released on January 29, and the full music video on February 3.

== Promotion ==
Everglow was supposed to hold a live fan showcase on February 3 but it was canceled for the public because of coronavirus prevention concerns. They held the showcase without audience where they performed "Dun Dun" and "Salute".

The group began promoting "Dun Dun" on February 6. They first performed the lead single on Mnet's M Countdown together with "Salute", followed by performances on KBS' Music Bank, MBC's Show! Music Core and SBS' Inkigayo.

After their tour in the U.S., they returned with a final round of promotions performing "No Lie" and "Player".

== Track listing ==
Track listing for Reminiscence
No.	Title	Lyrics	Music	Arrangement	Length
1.	"Salute"	Lee Seu-ran	Olof Lindskog; Caesar & Loui; Hayley Aitken 72	Ollipop; Ludwig Lindell	3:09
2.	"Dun Dun"	Seo Ji-eum	Olof Lindskog; Gavin Jones; Hayley Aitken; 72	Ollipop	3:12
3.	"Player"	Lee Bo-ra	Olof Lindskog; Ludwig Lindell; Hayley Aitken; 72	Ollipop; Ludwig Lindell	3:13
4.	"No Lie"	Lee Seu-ran	Olof Lindskog; Gavin Jones; Hayley Aitken; 72	Ollipop	3:38
Total length:					13:12

== Credits and personnel ==
Adapted from the album liner notes.

Musicians

- Everglow – vocals, gang vocals
- Ollipop – drum programming, bass programming (tracks 1,3), bass (tracks 2,4), synthesizer programming (tracks 1,3,4), keyboard
- Ludwig Lindell – drum programming (tracks 1,3), bass programming (tracks 1,3), synthesizer programming (tracks 1,3), keyboard (tracks 1,3)
- Hayley Aitken – background vocals (tracks 1,3), gang vocals, vocal arrangement
- Rami Nu – background vocals (tracks 1,3), gang vocals (tracks 1,3)
- Sophia Pae – background vocals (tracks 2,4), gang vocals (tracks 2,4)

Technical

- Ollipop – producer, digital editing
- Ludwig Lindell – producer (tracks 1,3)
- Kim Sung-pil – vocal directing
- 72 – vocal directing
- Eugene Kwon – recording
- Min Sung-soo – recording
- Jang Woo-young – digital editing, mixing (track 3)
- Gu Jung-pil – mixing (track 1)
- Bob Horn – mixing (track 2)
- MasterKey – mixing (track 4)
- Kwon Nam-woo – mastering

Studios

- Doobdoob Studio – recording
- MWF Hive – digital editing, mixing (track 3)
- Björk Studios – digital editing
- Klang Studio – mixing (track 1)
- The Echo Bar Recording Studio – mixing (track 2)
- 821 Sound – mixing (track 4), mastering

Publishing

- The Kennel AB – original publishing
- The Key Artist Publishing – original publishing
- Universal Music Publishing Korea – sub-publishing
- The Key Artist Agency – sub-publishing

== Charts ==
Sales chart performance for Reminiscence
Chart (2020)	Peak position
Japanese Albums (Oricon)	48
Japan Hot Albums (Billboard Japan)	90
South Korean Albums (Gaon)	4
US World Albums (Billboard)	14

Sales and streaming chart performance for "Dun Dun"
Chart (2020)	Peak position
Japan (Japan Hot 100)	61
South Korea (Gaon Download Chart)	63
South Korea (K-pop Hot 100)	85
US World Digital Songs (Billboard)	3

== Release history ==
Release formats for Reminiscence
Region	Date	Format	Distributor
Various	February 3, 2020	Digital download; streaming	Yuehua; Stone Music
South Korea	February 3, 2020	Digital download; streaming	Yuehua; Stone Music
South Korea	February 3, 2020	CD	Yuehua; Stone Music

== See also ==
- List of 2020 albums
