= Slay (song) =

Single by Everglow

from the album All My Girls
- Language: Korean
- Released: August 18, 2023
- Studio: Doob Doob Studio (Seoul)
- Genre: Electronic; hip hop
- Length: 3:41
- Label: Yuehua; Stone Music
- Composers: David Anthony; Andy Love; Lauren Dyson; 72
- Lyricists: Ji Su-jeong (Mumw); Andy Love; Lauren Dyson; 72
- Producer: Bangkok

Everglow singles chronology
"Pirate" (2021)	"Slay" (2023)	"Zombie" (2024)

Music video
- "Slay" on YouTube

"Slay" is a song recorded by South Korean girl group Everglow for their fourth single album All My Girls. It was released as the album's lead single by Yuehua Entertainment on August 18, 2023.

== Background and release ==
On July 26, 2023, Yuehua Entertainment announced Everglow would be releasing new music on August 18. A day later, it was announced they would be releasing their fourth single album titled All My Girls, with the promotional schedule was also released in the same day. On August 3, the track listing was released with "Slay" announced as the lead single. The music video teaser showcasing individual members was released from August 7 to 12. On August 14, the music video teaser showcasing the entire group was released. Two days later, the highlight medley teaser video was released. The song was released alongside the single album and its music video on August 18.

== Composition ==
"Slay" was written and composed by Andy Love, Lauren Dyson, and 72, with Ji Su-jeong of MUMW participating in the lyrics writing, David Anthony participating in the composition, and Bangkok participating in the arrangement. It was described as electronic hip hop song characterized by "powerful drum rhythm and repeatitive melody".

== Commercial performance ==
"Slay" debuted at number 83 on South Korea's Circle Download Chart in the chart issue dated August 13–19, 2023.

== Promotion ==
Prior to the release of All My Girls, on August 18, 2023, the group held a live event to introduce the extended play and its songs, including "Slay", and to communicate with their fans. The group subsequently performed on four music programs in the first week of promotion: Mnet's M Countdown on August 24, KBS's Music Bank on August 25, MBC's Show! Music Core on August 26, and SBS's Inkigayo on August 27. On the second week of promotion, they performed on six music programs: SBS M's The Show on August 29, MBC M's Show Champion on August 30, M Countdown on August 31, Music Bank on September 1, Show! Music Core on September 2, and Inkigayo on September 3, where they won first place for their appearance at Show Champion.

== Credits and personnel ==
Adapted from the album liner notes.

Song credits

- Everglow – vocals
- David Anthony – composer
- Andy Love – composer, lyricist, vocal arrangement
- Lauren Dyson – composer, lyricist, background vocals
- 72 – composer, lyricist, vocal directing (at The Key Artist Agency)
- Ji Su-jeong (지수정) – lyricist
- Bangkok – producer, drum programming, bass, synthesizer programming, keyboard
- Sophia Pae – background vocals
- Jang Woo-young – recording (at Doob Doob Studio)
- Woooooo0 – digital editing (at MWF Hives)
- Jaime Velez – mixing (at Blackwood Studios)
- Kwon Nam-woo (권남우) – mastering (at 821 Sound)

Visual credits

- Kwon Yong-soo – music video directing
- You Won-sik – music video directing
- Jo Na-in – choreography
- Kim Ji-hye (김지혜) – performance directing
- Park Joo-hee (박주희) – performance directing

== Accolades ==
Music program awards for "Slay"
Program	Date	Ref.
Show Champion	August 30, 2023	

== Charts ==
Chart performance for "Slay"
Chart (2023)	Peak position
South Korea Download (Circle)	83
US World Digital Song Sales (Billboard)	13

== Release history ==
Release history for "Slay"
Region	Date	Format	Label
Various	August 18, 2023	Digital download; streaming	Yuehua; Stone Music

== See also ==
- List of Show Champion Chart winners (2023)
