= Arrival of Everglow =

Single album by Everglow
- Released: March 18, 2019
- Recorded: 2019
- Length: 11:35
- Language: Korean
- Label: Yuehua; Genie; Stone

Everglow chronology
Arrival of Everglow (2019)	Hush (2019)

Singles from Arrival of Everglow
- 1. "Bon Bon Chocolat" Released: March 18, 2019

Arrival of Everglow (stylized in all caps) is the debut single album by South Korean girl group Everglow. The album was released digitally on March 18, 2019 and physically on March 19, 2019 by Yuehua Entertainment, and distributed by Genie Music and Stone Music Entertainment. The single album contains three tracks: "Moon", "D+1", and the lead single, "Bon Bon Chocolat".

== Background and release ==
On March 6, 2019, Yuehua Entertainment announced via SNS that Everglow would debut with the single album Arrival of Everglow.

Concept images featuring each of the members were released on March 8, 2019. The album contains three tracks: "Moon", the lead single "Bon Bon Chocolat", and "D+1". The music video teaser for "Bon Bon Chocolat" was released on March 12 and the full music video on March 18.

The choreography for "Bon Bon Chocolat" was made by Lia Kim.

== Promotion ==
Everglow held a live showcase at the Blue Square YES24 Live Hall on March 18, where they performed all three songs on the album.

The group started promoting the lead single "Bon Bon Chocolat" on March 21. They first performed it on Mnet's M Countdown, and later on KBS' Music Bank, MBC's Show! Music Core and SBS' Inkigayo.

== Commercial performance ==
The single "Bon Bon Chocolat" debuted at number 5 on the Billboard World Digital Songs chart and number 10 at KKBox Kpop chart.

== Track listing ==
No.	Title	Lyrics	Music	Arrangement	Length
1.	"Moon" (달아)	Seo Ji-eum; E:U	Andreas Öberg; Ludwig Lindell; Skylar Mones; Rosanna Ener	Ludwig Lindell	3:14
2.	"Bon Bon Chocolat" (봉봉쇼콜라)	JQ; Tomboy; Yoonsoo; Lee Ji-won (makeumineworks)	Melanie Fontana; Michel 'Lindgren' Schulz; Jurek Reunämaki	Jurek Reunämaki; Michel 'Lindgren' Schulz	3:49
3.	"D+1"	Brother Su	72; Andrew Lane; Breezelle Fox; Geist; Pollock	Geist; Pollock	4:37
Total length:					11:00

== Charts ==
Chart (2019)	Peak position
South Korean Albums (Gaon)	6

== Accolades ==
Year-end lists
Critic/Publication	List	Song	Rank	Ref.
MTV	The Best K-pop B-sides of 2019	"Moon"	19	
Refinery29	The Best K-Pop Songs Of 2019	"Bon Bon Chocolat"	19	

== Release history ==
Region	Date	Format	Distributor
Various	March 18, 2019	Digital download	Yuehua Entertainment; Genie Music; Stone Music Entertainment
South Korea	March 18, 2019	Digital download	Yuehua Entertainment; Genie Music; Stone Music Entertainment
South Korea	March 19, 2019	CD	Yuehua Entertainment; Genie Music; Stone Music Entertainment
