= NAME (group) =

Chinese girl group

NAME组合
- Also known as: NAME, NAME组合
- Origin: Beijing, China
- Genres: C-pop; Mandopop
- Years active: 2021-Present
- Label: Yuehua Entertainment
- Members: Liu Jiaxin; Ouyang Chengxi; Long Yunzhu; Li Siyang
- Past members: Feng Ruohang; Jin Zihan; Li Jiajia

NAME组合 (short for New Alluring Maybe Energy) is a four member girl group under Yuehua Entertainment. They made their debut as seven members on December 10, 2021 with the single "Say My Name".

== Members ==
=== Feng Ruohang ===
Originally debuted in the girl group 'OYT女团' under Shengyuan Inter Entertainment, Ruohang debuted after the groups establishment through the survival show 'XI ELEVEN'. OYT女团 released their debut EP 'XI ELEVEN' on November 28, 2018. She ended up participating in Youth With You 2 along 2 of the OYT女团 members. With her members both being eliminated in the first round, Ruohang finished in 44th place out of 109 trainees. During 2020 she also participated as a Star Mentor on the show '这，就是少年(This, is youth.)'. OYT女团 released two more singles after the show that unfortunately did not gain enough traction for the group. OYT女团 silently disbanded in 2021 by deleting their social media accounts following Ruohang's departure in July. After her departure from OYT she was announced as a member of NAME on December 2, 2021.

=== Jin Zihan ===
Participated in Youth With You 2 under Yuehua Entertainment. Finishing in 11th place, placing her just 2 places behind debuting in THE9. After her participation in the show Yuehua revealed on the 14th of January 2020 that Jin Zihan along with 4 other trainees that appeared on the show would form a new group called 'DAYLIGHT'. After Youth With You 2 posts about the other members except Jin Zihan, also known as Aria, slowed to a stop. Following the departure of 3 out of 5 members it was assumed their debut was cancelled. Jin Zihan was revealed as a member of NAME on the 4th of December 2021. Thus fully confirming DAYLIGHTs disbandment/cancelled debut.

=== Li Jiajia ===
Originally debuting as a member of the K-pop girl group 'Nature' on

Debuted as a member of the Korean girl group Nature in 2018, 2019n. CH Entertainment announced Gaga's withdrawal from the group due to her concentration on her studies.

=== Ouyang Chengxi ===
Became a trainee of Lehua Entertainment in 2020, and participated in the variety show Luminous Name the following year.

== Releases ==
On December 10, 2021, the group released their first single, "Say My Name".

On February 14, 2022, the Valentine's special single "Amazing" will be released.

On March 31, 2022, the single "Red Shoes" will be released.
