= Kim Si-hyeon =

South Korean singer and actress (born 1999)

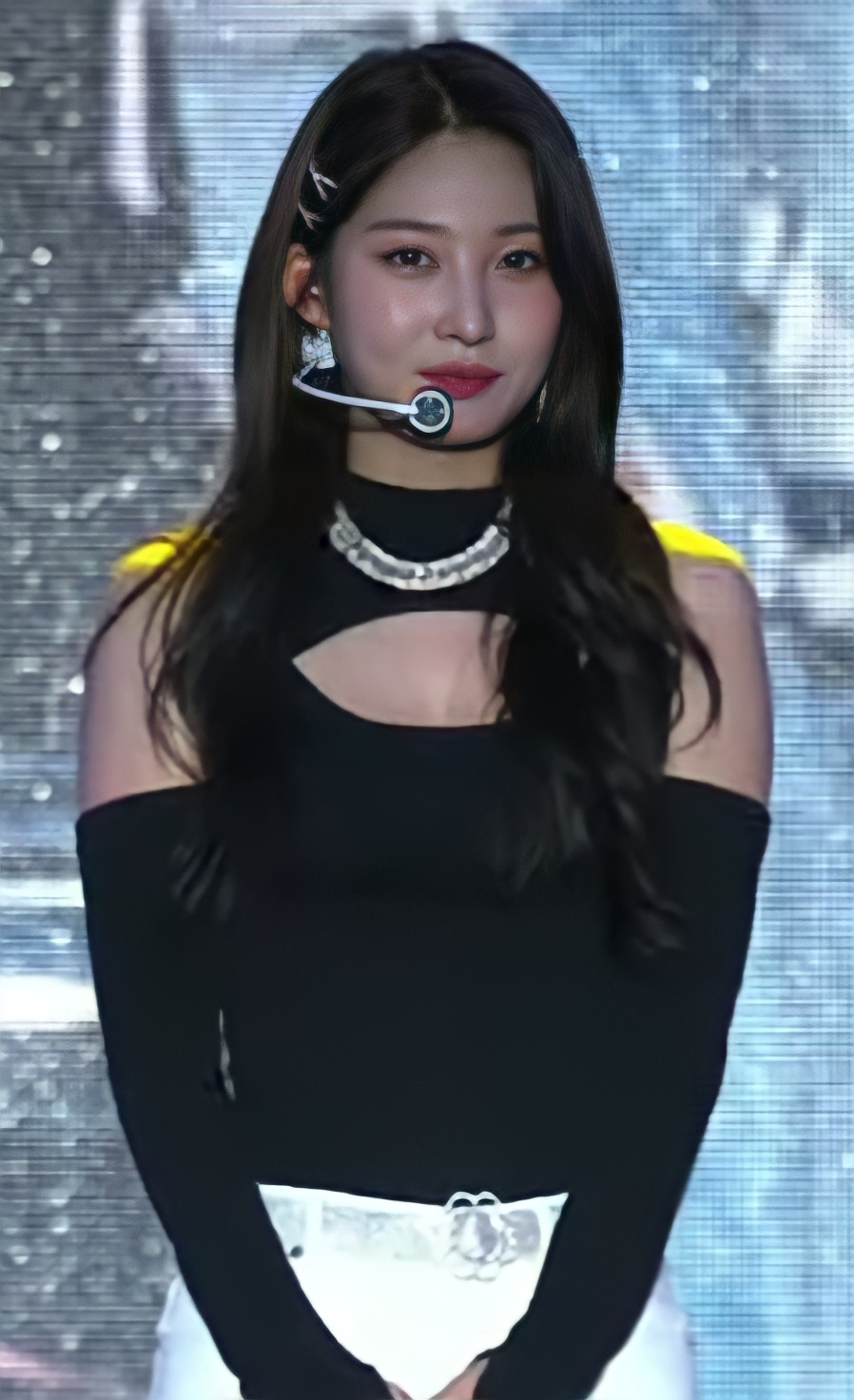
- Kim in July 2022
- Born: August 5, 1999 (age 26); Seongnam, South Korea
- Occupations: Singer; actress
- Musical career
- Genres: K-pop
- Instrument: Vocals
- Years active: 2019–present
- Labels: Yuehua; Chxxta Company
- Member of: Everglow

Korean name
- Hangul: 김시현
- Hanja: 金施賢
- RR: Gim Sihyeon
- MR: Kim Sihyŏn

Kim Si-hyeon (Korean: 김시현; born August 5, 1999), known mononymously as Sihyeon, is a South Korean singer and actress. She is the leader and vocalist of girl group Everglow, formed by Yuehua Entertainment.

== Life and career ==
=== 1999–2018: Early life and career beginnings ===
Kim was born on August 5, 1999, in Bundang District, Seongnam, South Korea. In 2016, Kim competed in the first season of Mnet's reality television competition Produce 101 where she got finished at the 40th placed afterwards, and signed a contract with Yuehua Entertainment. In 2018, Kim joined the third season of the franchise, Produce 48 alongside future group mate Wang Yiren. Kim placed 27th and was once again eliminated in the third round with Wang Yiren.

=== 2019–present: Debut with Everglow and solo activities ===
Kim debuted with Everglow on March 18, 2019. Everglow released their first single album, Arrival of Everglow, with the lead single "Bon Bon Chocolat", with their debut showcase. On February 7, 2020, Kim was chosen as a new MC for SBS MTV's music program "The Show" alongside The Boyz's Juyeon and Kim Min-kyu. On May 25, 2021, it was announced that Kim would be replacing E:U as the leader of Everglow, as E:U stated that she didn't have any strength while being a leader. On April 12, 2024, it was announced that Kim would be making her acting debut in the television series Salon de Holmes.

== Filmography ==
=== Television series ===
Year	Title	Role	Ref.
2025	Salon de Holmes	Noh Mi-nyeo	

=== Television shows ===
Year	Title	Role	Notes	Ref.
2016	Produce 101	Contestant	Finished 40th	
2018	Produce 48	Contestant	Finished 27th	
2020–2021	The Show	MC	with Minkyu and Juyeon	
