= YHBOYS =

Chinese boy band created by Yuehua Entertainment

- Genres: Mandopop, C-pop
- Occupations: Singers, Actors, Models, Dancers
- Years active: 2017–2020
- Label: Yuehua Entertainment
- Website: YHBOYS Official Weibo

Chinese name
- Traditional Chinese: 樂華少年
- Simplified Chinese: 乐华少年
Transcriptions
Standard Mandarin
- Hanyu Pinyin: yuè huá shào nián

YHBOYS was a Chinese boy group created by Yuehua Entertainment in 2017. They debuted in 2017. The group consists of the leader Zhang Junyi and members Guo Dianjia, Zhang Minghao, Liu Guanyi, Zhang Enshuo, Sun Jiakai and Li Linma. The group's concept is to empower fans to participate in the growth of the members from the moment of their debut, while the members pursue their careers in both singing and acting.

== Members ==
- Zhang Junyi (Chinese: 张俊一), was born on July 13, 2004 (age 22) in Nanchang, Jiangxi. He is the group leader.
- Guo Dianjia (郭殿甲), was born on August 9, 2004 (age 22) in Nanchang. He is one of the group's dancers.
- Zhang Minghao (张铭浩), was born on November 6, 2004 (age 21) in Harbin, Heilongjiang. He is one of the lead singers in the group.
- Liu Guanyi (刘冠毅), was born on March 9, 2005 (age 21) in Taiwan. He is also one of the lead singers in the group.
- Zhang Enshuo (张恩硕), was born on January 15, 2006 (age 20) in Handan, Hebei. He is one of the dancers in the group.
- Sun Jiakai (孙嘉锴), was born on January 19, 2007 (age 19) in Inner Mongolia. He is in charge of cuteness in the group.
- Li Linma (李林孖), was born on July 5, 2007 (age 19) in Shijiazhuang, Hebei. He is one of the group's dancers.

== History ==
=== Pre-debut ===
Guanyi was a child actor prior to joining Yuehua and has participated in multiple TV dramas, web-movies and commercials since 2009.

Junyi was a participant of a CCTV reality TV show "最野暑假 (Wildest Summer Vacation)" in 2015 and Beijing TV's "音乐大师课 (Music Masters' Class)" in 2016.

Minghao made his first public appearance as a child judge for Anhui TV's "加油好baby (Fighting! Fantastic Baby)" program in 2015 and has since participated in many variety shows and movies prior to joining Yuehua.

Linma was a dancer prior to joining Yuehua. In 2016, he participated in UNIQ's Yibo's opening performance for Hunan TV's Day Day Up.

On January 24, 2017, the group's information was announced on their official weibo account along with the first member of the group, Minghao. A new member was announced every Tuesday and Friday until the final member, Jia Kai was announced on February 14, 2017.

On February 15, 2017, YHBOYS released their first digital single "前方的世界 (The World Ahead)".

On March 27, 2017, they followed up with their second digital single "梦想加油 (Dream Fighting)".

On April 9, 2017, YHBOYS made their first live performance at the 17th Annual Top Chinese Music Awards.

On April 17, 2017, they released their third digital single "阳光小鬼头 (Sunshine Boys)".

On May 4, 2017, their first group variety show YHBOYS的艺能时光机 (YHBOYS' Talent Time Machine) was announced and episode zero of the show was aired on Yinyuetai the next day.

On May 19, 2017 Billboard Music Award announced that YHBOYS were invited to the 2017 BBMAs' Magenta Carpet.

On July 10, 2017, they released their fourth digital single, "魔Fun乐园 (Magic Fun Land)", which is also their last high-budget music video ever. YHBoys grew more and more successful as a new rising boy group in the music industry.

== Filmography ==
=== Dramas ===
Year	Title	Member(s)	Notes
2011	Garage Brotherhood	Guanyi	
2011	Dear Mother, Dear Daughter	Guanyi	Young Male Lead
2013	Little Daddy	Guanyi	Cameo
2014	Attack of the Students: New Comers	Guanyi	Co-Lead

=== Web Films ===
Year	Title	Member(s)	Notes
2012	End of the World	Guanyi	Supporting Cast
2012	Guess Game Move	Guanyi	Cameo
2012	Note to BFF	Guanyi	Cameo
2015	108 Poetry Stories of the Tang Dynasty	Minghao	Liu Xian Ge Story

=== Films ===
Year	Title	Member(s)	Notes
2017	After School	Minghao	Child Lead

== Music videos ==
Year	Title	Member(s)	Notes
2017	流星雨 (Meteor Shower)	All	Cover Version
2017	前方的世界 (The World Ahead)	All Except Dianjia & Enshuo	The theme song of TV show "了不起的孩子 (Fantastic Baby)"
2017	梦想加油 (Dream Fighting)	All Except Dianjia	
2017	阳光小鬼头 (Sunshine Boys)	All	
2017	A-OK	All	Promotional song of Transformers: The Last Knight in China
2017	魔FUN乐园 (Magical FUN Land)	All	
2017	国家 (Country)	All	Cover Version
2018	I Can Do It	All	
2018	Summer Work	All Except Linma	
