= La De Da (music festival) =

- Dates: 30–31 December
- Locations: Martinborough, New Zealand
- Years active: 2010 - 2013
- Website: ladeda.co.nz

La De Da was an annual music festival held at Daisybank Farm, in Martinborough, New Zealand with approximately 10,000 attendees.

The festival was opened on 30 December 2010 at Alana Estate Vineyard and in 2011 was shifted to Daisybank Farm.

The final festival was held in 2013, due to substantial debts from a previous organiser of the festival. In 2014 a proposal was made to move the festival to Wellington City, but the Wellington City Council declined to support the move.

== Line-ups ==
=== 2010 ===
Six60, Kora, Katchafire, Hollie Smith, Salmonella Dub, Mt Eden Dubstep, 1814, Thomas Oliver Band

=== 2011 ===
Fat Freddy's Drop, Donavon Frankenreiter, Katchafire, Sola Rosa, Iva Lamkum, Six60, Kora, SKisM, Dodge & Fuski, Eddie K, State of Mind, Concord Dawn, The Upbeats Giza

=== 2012 ===
Shapeshifter, De La Soul, Andy C, David Dallas, Ladi 6, Concord Dawn, Dub FX, Delta Heavy

=== 2013 ===
A$AP Rocky, Flume, Jack Beats, What So Not, Ladi6, Bombs Away, Dead Prez, DJ Yoda, Upiuo, Peking Duk, Loadstar, Nu:Logic, Spy, Spectrasoul, House of Shem, Sons of Zion, Five Mile Town
