= Melanie Fontana =

American singer, composer and songwriter

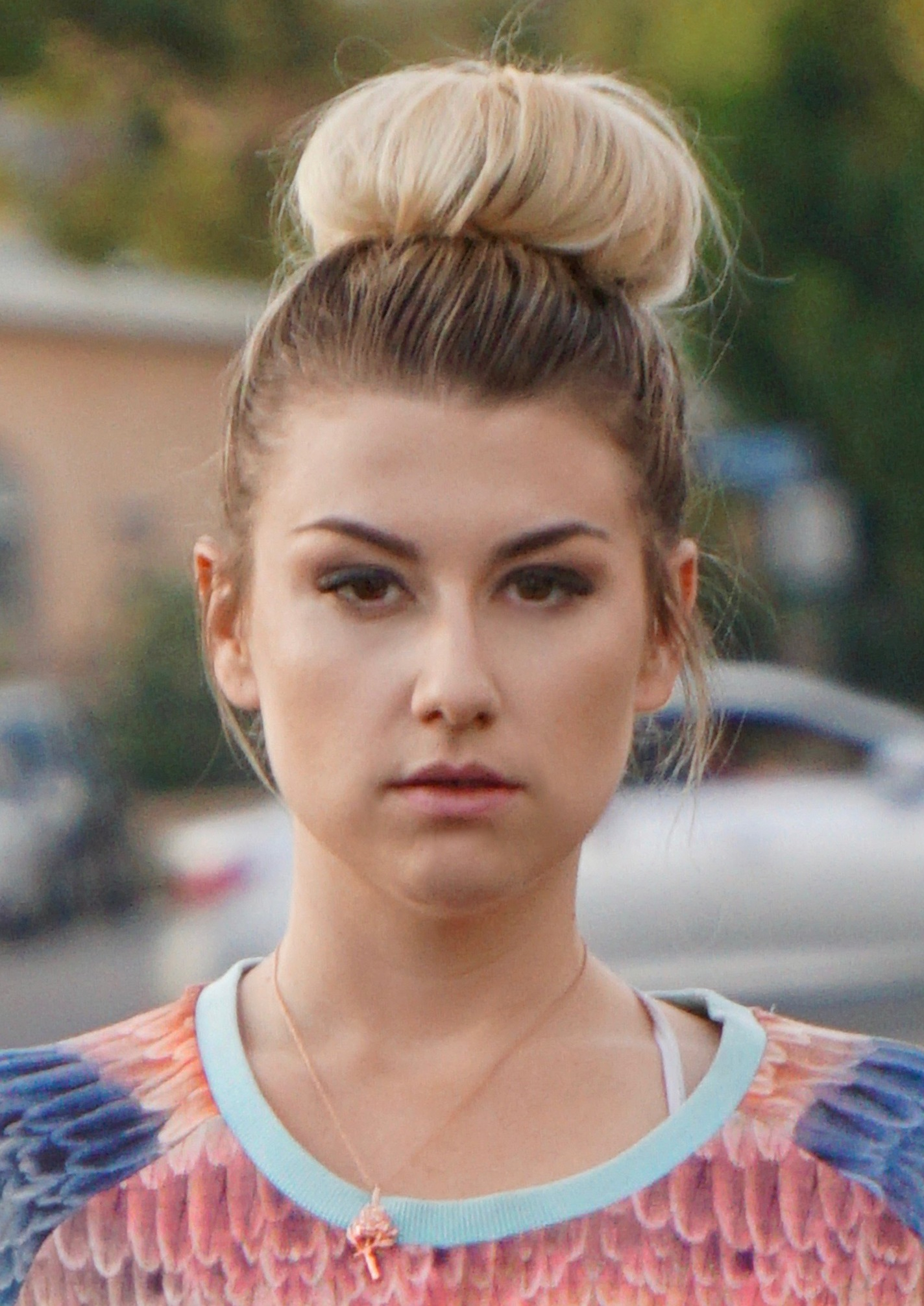
- Melanie Fontana in 2017

Background information
- Born: Melanie Joy Fontana; October 3, 1986 (age 40); Newington, Connecticut, US
- Genres: EDM; pop; country; R&B; urban
- Occupations: Singer; composer; songwriter
- Years active: 2011–present

Melanie Joy Fontana (born October 3, 1986) is an American singer, composer and songwriter signed to Universal Music Group.

== Early life ==
Fontana was born in Newington, Connecticut. She moved to New York City when she was 18, after spending seven years commuting to Manhattan, where she would audition for singing roles and work as a demo singer, recording songs for writers to pitch to record companies.

== Career ==
Fontana co-wrote the 2011 Justin Bieber song "Home This Christmas" with Nasri Atweh. It was featured on Bieber's Christmas album Under the Mistletoe. Also in 2011, Fontana co-wrote the original theme song to Shelter Me, a PBS show, hosted by Katherine Heigl that celebrated the human-animal bond. The series focuses on shelter animal success stories. The theme song, "Love is Everything (Shelter Me)," was written by Austin Bis, Fontana and Daniel Walker, and performed by Fontana. In 2014, she co-wrote the song "Hit Me Up" with Lars Hustoft and Jon Asher for Eurovision Song Contest competitor Charlie Tepstad of Norway.

On April 5, 2013, the song "Nothing Really Matters" by tyDi, which Fontana was featured on and was co-written by STIX of Fly Panda, debuted on Billboard. It reached number 39 on the Billboard Dance Club Songs chart in 2013. Also in 2013, Fontana worked as a songwriting consultant on Norway's Idol television show, co-writing Astrid S's single "Shattered", which went Gold in Scandinavia. In 2015, Fontana, alongside tyDi, topped the Mediabase dance charts at Number 1 with their EDM track "Redefined", co-written by Priya J. Geddis. The song was SiriusXM's top song of 2015 on its BPM station. She also collaborated with tyDi and Col3man on the 2017 single "That's How You Know".

In 2016, Britney Spears released the Japanese edition of her album Glory, including a song written by Fontana with Jon Asher and produced by DJ Mustard, titled "Mood Ring". Fontana had three Top 10 singles stemming from the Korean Mnet TV show Produce 101: "Crush", "Yum Yum" and "Fingertips". On April 1, 2016, Aaron Carter released "Fools Gold" which was co-written by Fontana, Carter, Asher, Taylor Hegelson and Michel "Lindgren" Schulz. Fontana co-wrote all five tracks on Carter's 2017 comeback EP LøVë. On October 7, 2016, Daya released Sit Still, Look Pretty, which included two songs penned by Fontana, "Words" and "All Right". She co-wrote The Chainsmokers single "Setting Fires", released in November 2016, and the BTS single "Euphoria", released in April 2018, which reached number 2 on the Billboard World Digital Songs chart. She and her husband Michel "Lindgren" Schulz helped write the 2019 BTS single "Boy with Luv" featuring Halsey, which was the fastest YouTube video to reach 100 million views (doing it in under two days). Fontana is managed by Justin Garza.

Alongside Lindgren, she co-wrote "Takedown" for the soundtrack of the 2025 animated film KPop Demon Hunters, which was performed by Ejae, Audrey Nuna, and Rei Ami as the fictional K-pop girl group Huntrix, as well as by Jeongyeon, Jihyo, and Chaeyoung of Twice.

== Writing credits ==
Year	Artist	Album	Song
2011	Justin Bieber ft. The Band Perry	Under the Mistletoe	"Home This Christmas"
2013	Astrid S		"Shattered"
2013	Sverre Eide		"Chain Reaction"
2013	Eirik Søfteland		"Lust or Love"
2013	Girls' Generation	Girls & Peace	"Stay Girls"
2013	Becky	Gyu	"Gyu"
2014	Steffen Jakobsen	Six String Love Affair	"Set in Stone"
2014	Alex Marshall		"Si Je Pars"
2014	Charlie		"Hit Me Up"
2014	f(x)	Red Light	"Boom, Bang, Boom"
2014	Koda Kumi	Walk of My Life	"Dance In The Rain"
2014	Andreas Varady	Andreas Varady	"Don't Stop the Music"
2014	Constant Flow ft. Immortal Technique		"Moment Of Peace"
2014	Thomas Newson & Otto Orlandi		"Bells At Midnight"
2015	Shawn Hook	Analog Love	"Relapse"
2015	Edurne	Adrenalina	"One Shot"
2015	Lace Up		"Dripping Gold"
2016	I.O.I	Chrysalis	"Crush"
2016	Produce 101		"Fingertips"
2016	Produce 101		"Yum Yum"
2016	AOA	Runway	"Cherry Pop"
2016	Fiestar		"Apple Pie"
2016	Tiffany Hwang	I Just Wanna Dance	"Yellow Light"
2016	Los 5	Meet Los Five	"Do For Love"
2016	Britney Spears	Glory	"Mood Ring"
2016	The Chainsmokers	Collage	"Setting Fires"
2016	Daya	Sit Still, Look Pretty	"Words"
2016	Daya	Sit Still, Look Pretty	"All Right"
2016	Hyolyn feat. Jay Park	It's Me	"One Step"
2016	Hatty Keane		"In Your Arms"
2016	Sammi Sanchez		"Girls Talk"
2016	Sammi Sanchez		"Deeper"
2017	Aaron Carter	LøVë	"Fool's Gold"
2017	Aaron Carter	LøVë	"Let Me Let You"
2017	Aaron Carter	LøVë	"Sooner of Later"
2017	Aaron Carter	LøVë	"Same Way"
2017	Aaron Carter	LøVë	"Dearly Departed"
2017	Aaron Carter	LøVë	"Don't Say Goodbye"
2017	Minzy	Minzy Work 01: Uno	"Ni Na No"
2017	Minzy	Minzy Work 01: Uno	"Superwoman"
2017	RaNia	Refresh 7th	"Breathe Heavy"
2017	Kayef		"Paradies"
2017	Kayef		"Wir Sind Okay"
2017	Fabian Mazur ft. Dia Frampton		"Young Once"
2017	Melody Day	Kiss On the Lips	"Kiss On the Lips"
2017	R3hab & Krewella	The Wave	"Ain't That Why"
2017	ILLENIUM ft. Dia Frampton	Awake	"Needed You"
2018	Kayef		"Irgendwann Jetzt"
2018	BTS	Love Yourself: Answer	"Euphoria"
2018	AOA	Bingle Bangle	"Parfait"
2018	Topic ft. Juan Magan & Lena		"Sólo Contigo"
2018	Felix Sandman	EMOTIONS	"TONE IT DOWN"
2018	Drake Bell		"Fuego Lento"
2018	Loren Gray		"Kick You Out"
2018	DeathbyRomy	Monsters	"No More"
2019	DeathbyRomy	Love u - to Death	"Diamond Tears"
2019	DeathbyRomy	Love u - to Death	"Problems"
2019	DeathbyRomy	Love u - to Death	"Love U to Death"
2019	DeathbyRomy	Love u - to Death	"Sleep at Night"
2019	TXT	The Dream Chapter: Star	"어느날 머리에서 뿔이 자랐다 (CROWN)"
2019	TXT	The Dream Chapter: Star	"Cat & Dog"
2019	TXT	The Dream Chapter: Magic	"Angel Or Devil"
2019	TXT	The Dream Chapter: Magic	"9와 4분의 3 승강장에서 너를 기다려 (Run Away)"
2019	TXT	The Dream Chapter: Magic	"Can't We Just Leave the Monster Alive?"
2019	BETWEEN FRIENDS		"affection"
2019	BETWEEN FRIENDS		"u can still come over"
2019	Everglow	Arrival of EVERGLOW	"Bon Bon Chocolat"
2019	Everglow	Hush	"Hush"
2019	BTS	Map of the Soul: Persona	"Boy with Luv"
2019	BTS	Map of the Soul: Persona	"Mikrokosmos"
2019	Twice	Feel Special	"Trick It"
2019	Hyolyn		"니가 더 잘 알잖아(youknowbetter)"
2019	Jay Ulloa		"Perdóname"
2019	Brian Justin Crum		"I & U"
2019	Gavin Haley	Long Game	"Show Me"
2019	Jakob Delgado		"Lie"
2019	Wengie		"Empire" (featuring Minnie of (G)I-dle)
2020	Krewella	Zer0	"Scissors"
2020	Little Glee Monster	Bright New World	"SPIN"
2020	Little Glee Monster	Bright New World	"move on"
2020	BTS	Map of the Soul: 7	"On" (featuring Sia)
2020	BTS	Map of the Soul: 7 – The Journey	"Intro: Calling"
2020	BTS	Map of the Soul: 7 – The Journey	"Stay Gold"
2020	Dua Lipa	Future Nostalgia	"Good In Bed"
2020	Secret Number	Who Dis?	"Who Dis?"
2020	Hyolyn	Say My Name	"Say My Name"
2020	CLC	Helicopter	"Helicopter"
2020	CLC	Helicopter	"Helicopter - English Version"
2020	Everglow	-77.82X-78.29	"No Good Reason"
2020	Blackpink	The Album	"Bet You Wanna" (featuring Cardi B)
2020	Taeyeon	#GirlsSpkOut	"Worry Free Love"
2020	Twice	Eyes Wide Open	"I Can't Stop Me"
2020	TXT	Minisode1: Blue Hour	"Wishlist"
2020	TXT	Minisode1: Blue Hour	"Way Home"
2020	Enhypen	Border: Day One	"Given-Taken"
2020	Twice		"Cry for Me"
2021	Dove Cameron		"LazyBaby"
2021	Enhypen	Border: Carnival	"Drunk-Dazed"
2021	Everglow	Last Melody	"Don't Ask Don't Tell"
2021	TXT	The Chaos Chapter: Freeze	"0X1=Lovesong (I Know I Love You)" (featuring Seori)
2021	Loona	[&]	"Dance On My Own"
2021	Sunmi	1/6	"You Can't Sit with Us"
2021	Hyoyeon	Deep	"Second" (featuring Bibi)
2021	Twice	Formula of Love: O+T=<3	"Scientist"
2021	Twice	Formula of Love: O+T=<3	"Icon"
2022	Tomorrow X Together	Minisode 2: Thursday's Child	"Good Boy Gone Bad"
2022	Seventeen	Face the Sun	"Don Quixote"
2022	BTS	Proof	"Run BTS"
2022	fromis 9	From Our Memento Box	"Blind Letter"
2022	J-Hope	Jack in the Box	"Equal Sign"
2022	Seventeen	Sector 17	"_World"
2022	Hyolyn	Ice	AH YEAH
2022	Twice	Between 1&2	"Brave"
2023	Twice	Ready to Be	"Set Me Free"
2023	BTS	Bastions OST	"The Planet"
2023	&Team	First Howling: Now	"Firework"
2023	&Team	First Howling: Now	"Under the skin"
2023	Everglow	All My Girls	“Make Me Feel”
2023	Jihyo	Zone	"Killin' Me Good"
2023	Jihyo	Zone	"Talkin' About It" (featuring 24kGoldn)
2023	Blackpink		"The Girls"
2023	(G)I-dle	Heat	"I Want That"
2024	Twice	With YOU-th	"One Spark"
2024	Twice	With YOU-th	"Bloom"
2024	J-Hope	Hope on the Street Vol. 1	"i wonder…"
2024	Jung Kook		"Never Let Go"
2025	Bini	BINIverse	"Zero Pressure"
2025	Ive	Ive Secret	"Dear, My Feelings"
2025	Close Your Eyes	Snowy Summer	"You" (ㅠ)
2025	Jessica Andrea	JA1*	"Here We Go Again"
2025	Bini	Flames	"Sweet Tooth"
2025	Twice	KPop Demon Hunters (Soundtrack from the Netflix Film)	"Takedown"
2025	Ejae, Audrey Nuna and Rei Ami (as Huntrix)	KPop Demon Hunters (Soundtrack from the Netflix Film)	"Takedown"
2026	Illit	Break Even	"You're Under Arrest"
2026	TripleS	Love & Pop Pt. 2	"Andless"

== Discography ==
=== As featured artist ===
Year	Artist	Album	Song	Credit
2012	Melanie Fontana	Shelter Me Season 1 theme	"Love Is Everything (Shelter Me)"	Writer, vocals
2012	Rod Stewart	Merry Christmas, Baby		Choir/backing vocals
2013	Rhema Soul ft. Gawvi		"Party, Sleep, Repeat"	Writer, vocals
2013	tyDi ft. Melanie Fontana		"Nothing Really Matters"	Writer, vocals
2014	tyDi ft. Melanie Fontana	Redefined	"Redefined"	Writer, vocals
2014	Krysta Youngs ft. Laganja Estranja		"Gold Grill BBQ"	Writer, backing vocals
2014	John Dahlbäck		"Fireflies"	Writer, vocals
2015	Daya	Daya		Backing vocals
2016	Simple Plan	Taking One for the Team		Backing vocals
2016	Burak Yeter		"Go"	Writer, vocals
2016	Burak Yeter		"Go 2.0"	Writer, vocals
2016	Feider, Dzasko & Melanie Fontana	Protocol Presents Miami 2016	"Crashed"	Writer, vocals
2017	Otto Orlandi & ManyFew ft. Melanie Fontana		"Don't Miss You"	Writer, vocals
2017	tyDi with Col3man ft. Melanie Fontana		"That's How You Know"	Writer, vocals
2017	John Dahlbäck	Color In My Heart	"Catch Me If You Can"	Writer, vocals
2017	Otto Orlandi ft. Melanie Fontana		"Seven Days"	Writer, vocals
2019	Jason Ross ft. Melanie Fontana	1000 Faces	"Shelter"	Writer, vocals
2020	ARMNHMR ft. Melanie Fontana	The Free World	"Forever Young"	Writer, vocals
2021	Serhat Durmus ft. Melanie Fontana	Arres	"Arres"	Writer, vocals

=== Television and voice over ===
- Vocals for all songs on Nickelodeon's Shimmer and Shine animated TV series (2015–2020)
