= Glashaus (music producers) =

Glashaus is a music production team composed of brothers Dan and Tom Glashausser. Dan went to New York University for classical piano/sound engineering and Tom studied classical guitar and composition at Manhattan School of Music. Their songs have been recorded by Moxie Raia, Post Malone, Rita Ora, Rachel Platten, Travie McCoy, and Vic Mensa. Other credits include Selena Gomez, Wiz Khalifa, Ty Dolla Sign and Steve Aoki among others. The brothers are best known for their work with Moxie Raia. They produced and co-wrote six songs on her mix tape, 931 which Raia performed on Justin Bieber's Purpose World Tour. Glashaus has also worked on developing The Spencer Lee Band in collaboration with SB Projects and The Brain Music.
