= Everglow =

South Korean girl group

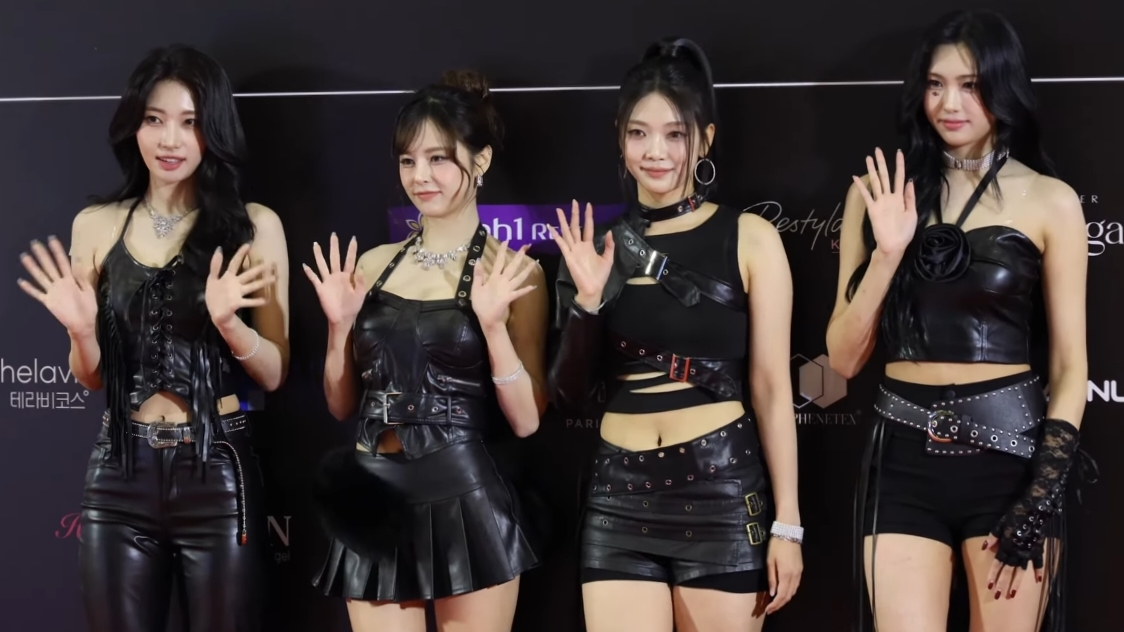
- Everglow in October 2025; L–R: Sihyeon, E:U, Onda, and Aisha

Background information
- Origin: Seoul, South Korea
- Genres: K-pop; EDM; synth-pop; hip hop; trap
- Years active: 2019–present
- Labels: YH; Chxxta
- Members: E:U; Sihyeon; Onda; Aisha
- Past members: Mia; Yiren

Everglow (Korean: 에버글로우, stylized in all caps) is a South Korean girl group under Chxxta Company. The quartet consists of members E:U, Sihyeon, Onda, and Aisha. Cited as the "ultimate performance boss" by Korean media, they are known for their EDM-trap-inspired synth-pop sound and adopting the "girl crush" concept in K-pop. Originally a six-piece, they regrouped after departing from their former label YH Entertainment, with former members Mia and Yiren absent.

Everglow debuted on March 18, 2019 with the single album Arrival of Everglow and its single "Bon Bon Chocolat", quickly earning the nickname of "monster rookies" from domestic media for their performance potential. Their subsequent singles, "Adios" (2019) and "Dun Dun" (2020), peaked at numbers 2 and 3 respectively on the U.S. World Digital Song Sales chart, further establishing the group's global presence. Their single "La Di Da" (2020), was named the best K-pop song of 2020 by Billboard.

== Career ==
=== Pre-debut ===
==== Members' individual activities ====
In 2008, Aisha (Heo Yoo-rim) became a trainee under JYP Entertainment after passing an audition; she left the agency eight years later. In 2016, Sihyeon competed in Mnet's reality television show Produce 101; she was eliminated on episode 8 and joined YH Entertainment. In 2017, Onda (Jo Se-rim) competed on Idol School and was eliminated in episode 4. E:U (Park Ji-won), who used to be a stunt cheerleader, appeared on SBS' show Delicious Cooking Class and modeled for the fashion brand Stare Shoes. In 2018, Sihyeon and Yiren took part on Produce 48 and were eliminated on episode 11.

==== Pre-debut group promotions ====
On February 17, 2019, YH Entertainment announced Everglow's debut and opened the group's first official social media accounts. Each member was revealed through the "Crank in Film" video series. On February 28, Everglow posted a dance cover video of "Rumor", song performed by Sihyeon on Produce 48, and it surpassed two million YouTube views in 24 hours. In the first half of March, Everglow posted concept photos, more covers, and the music video teaser for "Bon Bon Chocolat", which amassed over 5 million YouTube views in two days.

=== 2019: Debut and commercial breakthrough ===
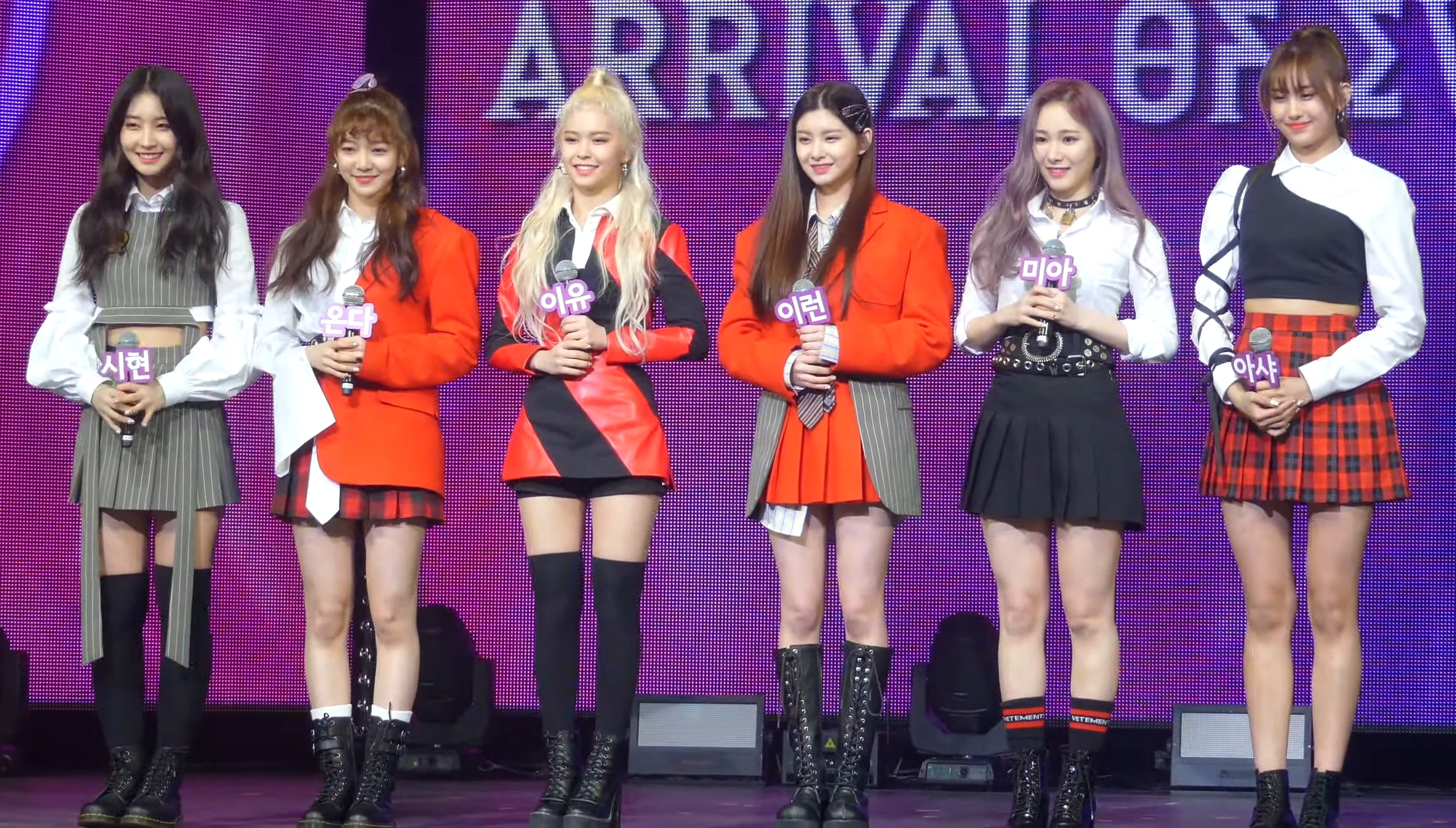
Everglow at the showcase event for Arrival of Everglow in March 2019

On March 18, 2019, Everglow released their first single album, Arrival of Everglow, with the lead single "Bon Bon Chocolat", co-written by American singer and songwriter Melanie Fontana. Member E:U co-wrote the track "Moon". The group made their official debut on March 21, 2019, by performing on music program M Countdown. Arrival of Everglow peaked at number six on the Gaon Album Chart, while "Bon Bon Chocolat" debuted at number five on the Billboard's World Digital Song Sales chart. On August 13, the first episode of the group's first television reality show Everglow Land premiered on Mnet. Its fifth and last episode premiered on September 10.

On August 19, 2019, the group released their second single album Hush with lead single "Adios". All three songs from the single album entered the Billboard World Digital Song Sales chart: "Adios" peaked at number two and remained on the chart for six weeks; the B-side tracks, "Hush" and "You Don't Know Me", peaked at number eight and 10, respectively. In addition, "Adios" ranked first on the iTunes K-pop Chart in 11 different countries and on the YouTube Trending Worldwide chart. Billboard columnist Jeff Benjamin described Everglow as a "group with a strong and empowering image that tends to connect more with Western audiences". Due to their commercial success, on September 24, Everglow won their first music show award on SBS M's The Show. The music video for "Adios" surpassed 100 million views in April 2020.

=== 2020: Continued success, first concert tour and −77.82X−78.29 ===
On February 3, 2020, Everglow released their first extended play (EP) Reminiscence with lead single "Dun Dun". The release brought the group significant commercial success both domestically and abroad. "Dun Dun" became their first single to enter one of South Korea's Gaon song charts, peaking at 63 on the Download Chart, while the EP debuted at number four on the Album Chart and sold over 27,000 copies in February 2020. Additionally, Reminiscence marked Everglow's first entry on the U.S. Billboard World Albums chart at 14, and on Japan's Oricon Album Chart at 48. The group's release was very well received by the South Korean media, which described Everglow as the "ultimate performance boss". The music video for "Dun Dun" gathered 22 million views in less than two days, and surpassed the 200 million views in April 2021. On March 6, Everglow embarked on their first concert tour, Everlasting Tour in USA, including six stops across the United States. (Note: Sold-out Los Angeles concert was cancelled due to the COVID-19 outbreak.)

On September 21, 2020, Everglow released their second extended play −77.82X−78.29 alongside synth-pop lead single "La Di Da", co-written by member E:U. The EP ranked first on the iTunes Worldwide Album Chart and sold over 45,000 copies as of October 2020. The music video for "La Di Da" garnered over 50 million views in its first week, and Billboard named the track Best K-pop Song of 2020. On November 12, Everglow released the soundtrack "Let Me Dance"—a remake of the 2003 song by Lexy featuring Teddy Park—for the South Korean TV series The Spies Who Loved Me.

=== 2021–2022: Last Melody, UNICEF Promise campaign and Return of the Girl ===
On May 25, 2021, Everglow released their third single album, Last Melody, with lead single "First". The single album ranked first on the Hanteo Daily Chart and sold over 52,000 copies in its first two months. "First" entered the World Digital Song Sales chart at number five along with their two B-side tracks, "Don't Ask Don't Tell" and "Please Please", which peaked at numbers 20 and 21, respectively. On June 1, 2021, the group won their second music program trophy on SBS M's The Show with "First".

In August 2021, Everglow partnered with UNICEF on the "Promise" campaign, aimed at promoting world peace and making children around the globe happier. The following day, they launched the "Promise" Dance Challenge, encouraging fans to record videos of themselves dancing to the song's choreography. For every participant, UNICEF donated a "Superhero Pack" to children worldwide. Each pack contained polio and measles vaccines and insecticide-treated mosquito nets to combat malaria.

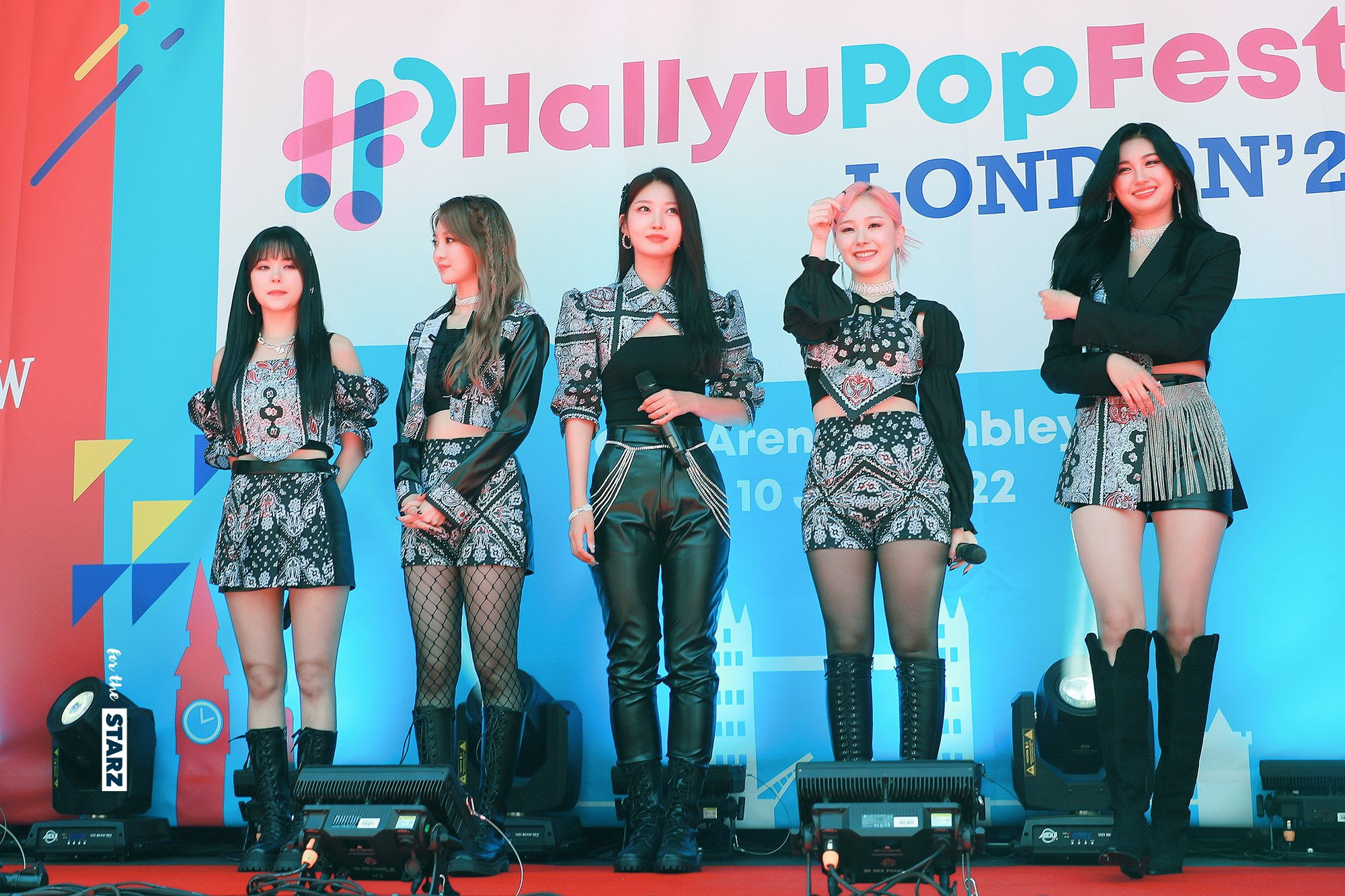
Everglow at HallyuPopFest in London in July 2022

On December 1, 2021, Everglow released their third extended play, Return of the Girl, along with the lead single "Pirate". The EP sold 40,000 copies in December, with all five tracks charting domestically. The group won the Best Music Video Award at the 2021 Asia Artist Awards on December 2. On April 15, 2022, Everglow collaborated with Dutch-Moroccan DJ R3hab on a remix of "Pirate".

In July 2022, Everglow made history as the first girl group to perform in Saudi Arabia at the Saranghae KSA K-pop Festival 2022 in Jeddah. In August 2022, they held a concert in Almaty, marking the first solo concert by a K-pop group in Kazakhstan. Everglow partnered with German DJ and producer TheFatRat to release the English-language single "Ghost Light" on November 18, 2022, along with a Korean version. Although the group had announced a Southeast Asia tour with four concerts in December, it was cancelled for unspecified reasons.

=== 2023–2024: All My Girls, touring and Zombie ===
Everglow released their fourth single album All My Girls and its lead single "Slay" on August 18, 2023, after 20 months without any album releases. On August 30, the group won its third music show trophy on MBC M's Show Champion with "Slay". Following album promotions, Everglow embarked on their second tour All My Girls in multiple sub-tours: a U.S. tour, a Europe tour, and two concerts in Japan. Midway through the tour—which covered concert dates from November 2023 to April 2024—the group held its first fan-meeting ever on January 13, 2024, in Hong Kong.

On May 21, 2024, Everglow announced the release of their fifth single album titled Zombie on June 10. The lead single of the same name was composed and produced by Grammy-winning production team The Stereotypes and 9am. The single album debuted at number nine on the Circle Album Chart, and all three tracks have entered the component Download Chart. Everglow embarked on their 2024 Pulse & Heart tour with eleven stops across the United States and South America, starting on September 12.

=== 2025–present: Departure from Yuehua, line-up change and Code ===
On May 13, 2025, it was announced that all six members would leave Yuehua upon the end of their contracts with the label in June. In September, members Sihyeon, E:U, Onda, and Aisha signed with new agency Chxxta Company to continue the group's activities as a quartet. On February 12, 2026, it was announced that Everglow would be releasing their fourth extended play Code on March 3, with the lead single of the same name.

== Members ==
Adapted from Yuehua Entertainment's website:

=== Current members ===
- E:U (이유) – rapper, vocalist, dancer
- Sihyeon (시현) – leader, vocalist
- Onda (온다) – vocalist, dancer
- Aisha (아샤) – vocalist, rapper, dancer

=== Former members ===
- Mia (미아) – vocalist, dancer
- Yiren (이런) – vocalist, dancer

=== Timeline ===
E:U was introduced as the leader member of Everglow. However, the leadership role was transferred to Sihyeon, as announced during the showcase event for Last Melody on May 25, 2021.

On January 9, 2022, Yuehua Entertainment announced that Yiren would take a break from group activities to return to China for family and academic reasons. On November 24, 2022, she reportedly returned to South Korea and resumed her activities with Everglow.

On August 11, 2022, Aisha suspended her activities due to sudden health issues. She resumed group activities at the Super Music Festival 2022 in Tokyo on August 22, 2022.

== Discography ==
=== Extended plays ===
List of extended plays, showing selected details, selected chart positions, and sales figures
Title	Details	Peak chart positions				Sales
Title	Details	KOR	JPN	JPN Hot	US World	Sales
Reminiscence	Released: February 3, 2020; Label: YH Entertainment; Formats: CD, digital download, streaming	4	48	90	14	KOR: 31,188; JPN: 1,649; US: 1,000
−77.82X−78.29	Released: September 21, 2020; Label: YH Entertainment; Formats: CD, digital download, streaming	4	49	—	—	KOR: 49,388
Return of the Girl	Released: December 1, 2021; Label: YH Entertainment; Formats: CD, digital download, streaming	10	—	—	—	KOR: 51,221
Code	Released: March 3, 2026; Label: Chxxta Company; Formats: CD, digital download, streaming; Track listing: 1. "Breakout"; 2. "Focus"; 3. "Code"; 4. "Can't Be Broken"	21	—	—	—	KOR: 8,431
"—" denotes releases that did not chart or were not released in that region.

=== Single albums ===
List of single albums, showing selected details, selected chart positions, and sales figures
Title	Details	Peak chart positions	Sales
Title	Details	KOR	Sales
Arrival of Everglow	Released: March 18, 2019; Label: YH Entertainment; Formats: CD, digital download, streaming	6	KOR: 28,033
Hush	Released: August 19, 2019; Label: YH Entertainment; Formats: CD, digital download, streaming	5	KOR: 28,639
Last Melody	Released: May 25, 2021; Label: YH Entertainment; Formats: CD, digital download, streaming	4	KOR: 53,255
All My Girls	Released: August 18, 2023; Label: YH Entertainment; Formats: CD, digital download, streaming	13	KOR: 44,144
Zombie	Released: June 10, 2024; Label: YH Entertainment; Formats: CD, digital download, streaming	9	KOR: 32,794

=== Singles ===
List of singles, showing year released, selected chart positions, sales figures, and name of the album
Title	Year	Peak chart positions				Sales	Album
Title	Year	KOR DL	KOR Hot	JPN Hot	US World	Sales	Album
"Bon Bon Chocolat" (봉봉쇼콜라)	2019	—	—	—	5	US: 5,000	Arrival of Everglow
"Adios"	2019	—	74	—	2	US: 1,000	Hush
"Dun Dun"	2020	63	85	61	3	US: 1,000	Reminiscence
"La Di Da"	2020	138	—	—	5	—N/a	-77.82X-78.29
"First"	2021	64	—	—	5	—N/a	Last Melody
"Pirate"	2021	100	—	—	13	—N/a	Return of the Girl
"Slay"	2023	83	—	—	13	—N/a	All My Girls
"Zombie"	2024	43	—	—	—	—N/a	Zombie
"Code"	2026	72	—	—	—	—N/a	Code
"—" denotes releases that did not chart or were not released in that region.

=== Other charted songs ===
List of other charted songs, showing year released, selected chart positions, sales figures, and name of the album
Title	Year	Peak chart positions		Sales	Album
Title	Year	KOR DL	US World	Sales	Album
"Hush"	2019	—	8	US: 1,000	Hush
"You Don't Know Me"	2019	—	10	—N/a	Hush
"Don't Ask Don't Tell"	2021	—	20	—N/a	Last Melody
"Please Please"	2021	—	21	—N/a	Last Melody
"Colourz"	2024	126	—	—N/a	Zombie
"Back 2 Luv"	2024	146	—	—N/a	Zombie
"Can't Be Broken"	2026	185	—	—N/a	Code
"—" denotes releases that did not chart or were not released in that region.

=== Other appearances ===
List of songs, showing year released, selected chart positions, and name of the album
Title	Year	Peak chart positions	Album
Title	Year	KOR DL	Album
"Let Me Dance"	2020	—	The Spies Who Loved Me OST
"Promise (for UNICEF Promise Campaign)"	2021	130	Non-album single
"Pirate (R3hab Remix)" (with R3hab)	2022	—	Non-album single
"Ghost Light" (with TheFatRat)	2022	—	Non-album single
"—" denotes releases that did not chart or were not released in that region.

== Filmography ==
=== Television series ===
Year	Title	Role	Notes	Ref.
2019	When the Devil Calls Your Name	Themselves	Cameo	

=== Television shows ===
Year	Title	Notes	Ref.
2019	Everglow Land	Reality show for Everglow	

== Videography ==
=== Music videos ===
Title	Year	Director(s)	Ref.
"Bon Bon Chocolat" (봉봉쇼콜라)	2019	Beomjin (VM Project Architecture)	
"Adios"	2019	Kim Woo-gie (Mother)	
"Dun Dun"	2020	Kim Woo-gie (Mother)	
"La Di Da"	2020	Kim Woo-gie (Mother)	
"First"	2021	Kim Woo-gie (Mother)	
"Promise (for UNICEF Promise Campaign)"	2021	Jung Eun-bi (Mother)	
"Pirate"	2021	Kim Young-jo, Yoo Seung-woo (Naive Creative Production)	
"Slay"	2023	Kwon Yong-soo, You Won-shik (Studio Saccharin)	
"Zombie"	2024	Ziyong Kim (Fantazy Lab)	
"Code"	2026	Khamkwan	

== Concerts and tours ==
=== Headlining tours ===
- Everglow: Everlasting Tour in USA (2020) (Note: Sold-out Los Angeles concert was cancelled due to the COVID-19 outbreak.)
- Everglow Southeast Asia Tour (2022; cancelled)
- Everglow US Tour [All My Girls] (2023)
- Everglow EU Tour [All My Girls] (2024)
- Everglow US & Brazil Tour <Pulse & Heart> (2024)

=== Headlining concerts ===
- Everglow Concert in Almaty (2022)
- Everglow Concert in Bishkek (2022)
- Everglow Concert in Astana (2022)
- Everglow Japan Concert [All My Girls] (2024)

=== Online concerts ===
- Everglow 1st Online Concert "The First" (2021)

== Awards and nominations ==
Name of the award ceremony, year presented, category, nominee of the award, and the result of the nomination
Award ceremony	Year	Category	Nominee / work	Result	Ref.
Asia Artist Awards	2020	AAA x Choeaedol Popularity Award – Female	Everglow	Nominated	
Asia Artist Awards	2021	Female Idol Group Popularity Award	Everglow	Nominated	
Asia Artist Awards	2021	Best Music Video Award	"First"	Won	
Asia Artist Awards	2023	Popularity Award – Singer (Female)	Everglow	Nominated	
Asia Model Awards	2025	Popularity Award – Singer	Everglow	Won	
Brand Customer Loyalty Awards	2021	Hot Trend Female Idol Group Award	Everglow	Nominated	
Brand Customer Loyalty Awards	2024	Female Idol (Rising Star)	Everglow	Nominated	
Gaon Chart Music Awards	2019	New Artist of the Year – Album	Everglow	Nominated	
Genie Music Awards	2019	The Top Artist	Everglow	Nominated	
Genie Music Awards	2019	The Female New Artist	Everglow	Nominated	
Genie Music Awards	2019	Genie Music Popularity Award	Everglow	Nominated	
Genie Music Awards	2019	Global Popularity Award	Everglow	Nominated	
Hanteo Music Awards	2023	Post-Generation Award	Everglow	Won	
MAMA Awards	2019	Artist of the Year	Everglow	Nominated	
MAMA Awards	2019	Best New Female Artist	Everglow	Nominated	
MAMA Awards	2019	Worldwide Fans' Choice Top 10	Everglow	Nominated	
MAMA Awards	2022	Worldwide Fans' Choice Top 10	Everglow	Nominated	
MTV Europe Music Awards	2020	Best Korean Act	Everglow	Nominated	
Seoul Music Awards	2020	New Artist Award	Everglow	Nominated	
Seoul Music Awards	2020	Popularity Award	Everglow	Nominated	
Seoul Music Awards	2020	Hallyu Special Award	Everglow	Nominated	
Seoul Music Awards	2020	QQ Music Most Popular K-Pop Artist Award	Everglow	Nominated	
