= Yuehua Entertainment =

Chinese entertainment company

- Type: Private
- Industry: Music; Entertainment
- Founded: June 2009
- Founder: Du Hua
- Headquarters: Beijing, China
- Key people: Du Hua (Founder, President and CEO); Li Ruigang (President of China Media Capital (CMC)); Park Moo-sung (President of YueHua Korea); Lee Sang-gyu (Co-CEO of YueHua Korea); Jung Hae-chang (Co-CEO of YueHua Korea)
- Products: Albums; Concerts; Music videos Movies
- Services: Publishing records Music Copyright; Artist Management; Film/TV Production; Entertainment agency
- Website: yuehuamusic.com yhent.co.kr

Yuehua Entertainment (Chinese: 乐华娱乐; pinyin: Yuèhuá Yúlè; Korean: 위에화 엔터테인먼트), is a privately held Chinese multinational entertainment group and talent agency based in Beijing. The company was founded in June 2009 by former Huayi Brothers employee Du Hua. Yuehua is involved in television production and distribution, movie production, artist management and training, music and music video production, public relations, and entertainment marketing. Yuehua Entertainment has previously partnered with South Korean companies like Pledis Entertainment, Starship Entertainment, and SM Entertainment.

Yuehua Entertainment received series-B financing from Gravity Media and CMC Capital in August 2014. CMC Capital invested US$49 million into the group and became its strategic shareholder at the completion of financing. In 2014, Yuehua Entertainment established a Korean branch located in Gangnam-gu, Seoul, South Korea. Yuehua announced plans for further expansion of their Korean branch operations beginning in February 2016.

On November 17, 2025, Yuehua Entertainment Korea was rebranded to YH Entertainment.

== China ==
=== Groups ===
- Uniq
- Next
- NAME
- Boyhood
- Loong9

=== VTuber groups ===
- A-SOUL
- EOE

=== Bands ===
- NEVERLAND

=== Soloists ===
- Han Geng
- Wang Yibo (Uniq)
- Zhou Yixuan (Uniq)
- Li Wenhan (Uniq)
- Ivy
- Cheng Xiao
- Wu Xuanyi
- Meng Meiqi
- Zhu Zhengting (Next)
- Bi Wenjun (Next)
- Huang Xin Chun (Next)
- Justin Huang (Next)
- Elvis Wang
- Hu Chunyang
- Chen Xinwei
- Tang Jiu Zhou
- Wang Yiren

=== Actors/Actresses ===
- Han Geng
- Wang Yibo
- Ao Quan
- Li Wenhan
- Zhang Junyi
- Liu Guanyi
- Zhu Zhengting
- Zhou Yixuan
- Bi Wenjun
- Wu Xuanyi
- Xu Ya Ting
- Meng Meiqi
- Cheng Xiao
- Hu Chunyang
- Huang Zheng
- Zhang Zi Jian
- Chen Xinwei
- Zhang Hao Lian
- Zhang Jing Yun

=== Drama/Film Directors ===
- Jang Tae-yoo (Chinese market only)

=== Notable trainees ===
- YHBOYS
- Ollie (Loong9)

== South Korea ==
=== Groups ===
- Uniq
- Tempest
  - Hyeongseop X Euiwoong
- And2ble

=== Soloists ===
- Choi Ye-na

=== Actors ===
- Lee Do-hyun
- Kim Sung-joo (Uniq)
- Hwang Hyun-joo
- Park Cheon

=== Model ===
- Hwang Hyun-joo

== North America ==
=== Soloists ===
- Emma Louise

== Former artists ==
=== China ===
- Next
  - Fan Chengcheng (2018–2023)
- TTUP (2023)
- Jin Zihan (2019–2025)

=== South Korea ===
- Uniq
  - Cho Seung-youn (2014–2022)
- WJSN (2016–2023)
- Tempest
  - Hwarang (2022–2024)
- Everglow (2019–2025)
