= Kim Sung-joo (entertainer) =

South Korean singer and actor (born 1994)

- 김성주
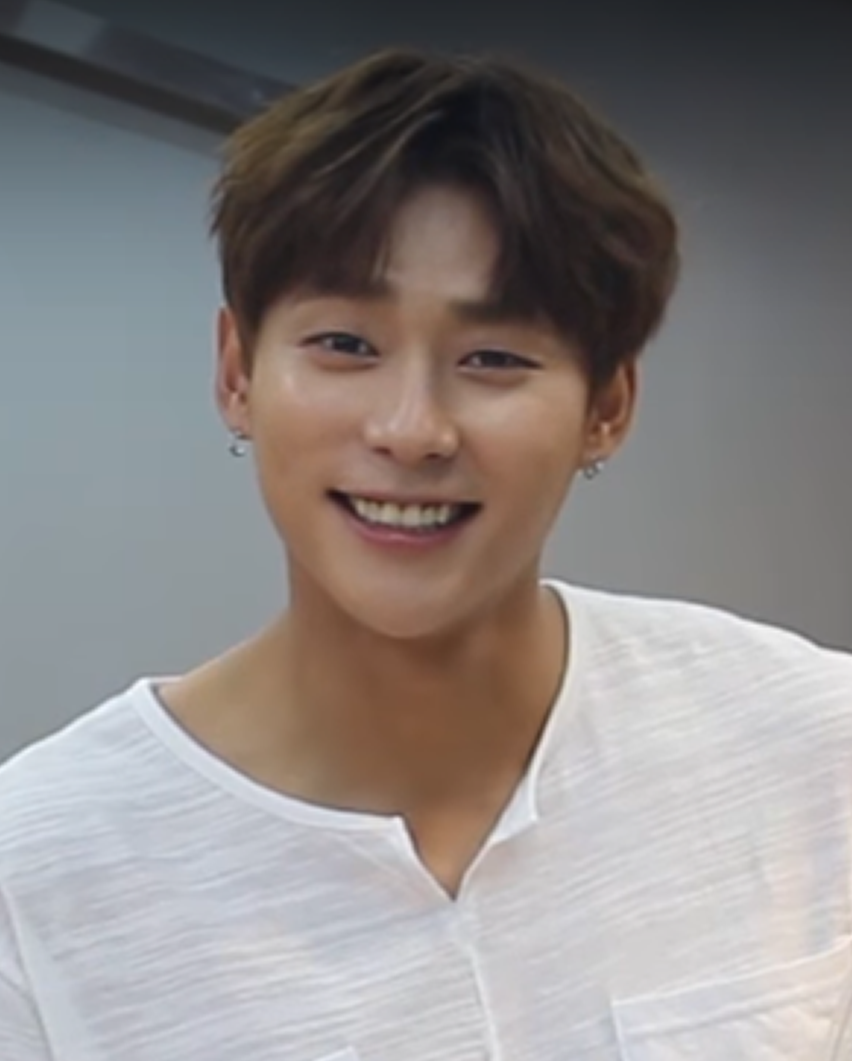
- Kim at Centro Cultural Hallyu in São Paulo, June 27, 2016
- Born: February 16, 1994 (age 32); Incheon, South Korea
- Education: Global Cyber University
- Occupations: Singer; actor
- Spouse: Unknown (m. 2024)
- Children: 1
- Musical career
- Genres: K-pop
- Instrument: Vocals
- Years active: 2014–present
- Label: Yuehua
- Member of: Uniq

Korean name
- Hangul: 김성주
- Hanja: 金聖柱
- RR: Gim Seongju
- MR: Kim Sŏngju

Kim Sung-joo (Korean: 김성주; born February 16, 1994) is a South Korean singer and actor. Kim debuted as a member of South Korean-Chinese band Uniq in 2014. Kim made his television debut in the romantic Chinese drama Magical Space-time (2016) and his film debut in MBA Partners (2016). He is best known for his supporting roles in Live Up to Your Name (2017) and My Secret Terrius (2018).

== Career ==
=== Pre-debut ===
He joined YG Entertainment as a trainee. He was part of the original lineup for Winner, but that didn't work out. He's still close friends with Jinwoo and Seungyoon.

A new opportunity arose and he ended up joining Uniq, a Korean-Chinese group under Yuehua. He still continued to train at YG Entertainment since the two companies were collaborating with this new group. He trained for a total of 5 years before his official debut.

=== 2014: Career beginnings ===
Kim debuted in 2014 with the South Korean-Chinese boy band group Uniq with the song "Falling in Love".

Kim promoted with Uniq for a few years, where he landed his first acting role in 2016, together with his band mates in the Chinese film, MBA Partners, where Kim and Wang Yibo playing the lead roles, while Zhou Yixuan, Li Wenhan and Cho Seung-youn making cameos.

Kim then starred in the Chinese drama, Magical Space-time before his second film in Kill Me Please.

=== 2017: Rising popularity with supporting roles ===
Kim was cast in The Liar and His Lover where he played "Yoo Si-hyun", the leader and vocalist of the popular band "Crude Play" in the series. He also starred in the tvN's drama Live Up to Your Name.

In September 2018, it was reported that Kim would be joining MBC's drama, My Secret Terrius, where he will play Ra Do-woo, a genius hacker who is rebellious.

Kim enlisted for his mandatory military service on 9 March 2020. Kim completed his military service and has been discharged as of 16 September 2021.

== Personal life ==
On March 2, 2024, Kim revealed that he is married and the father of a child.

== Discography ==
=== solo single ===
| Date | Album | Title |
| 2019.10.18 | 《As Long as You Understand》 | As Long as You Understand |
| 2024.07.26 | 《Our Immaturity》 | Our Immaturity |

=== other single ===
| Date | Album | Title | Singer |
| 2016.06.21 | 《Flying at Night》 | Flying at Night (Chinese version) | "SunDuck" OST |
| 2017.04.03 | 《The Liar and His Lover (TV series) OST》Part 3 | 괜찮아 난 | Crude Play (Band in Drama) |
| 2017.04.03 | 《The Liar and His Lover (TV series) OST》Part 3 | Peterpan | Crude Play (Band in Drama) |
| 2017.04.25 | 《The Liar and His Lover (TV series) OST》Part 7 | In Your Eyes | Crude Play (Band in Drama) |
| 2017.11.06 | 《Act.1》 | B1 | 11호 Feat Sung-joo |
| 2018.05.08 | 《You Drive Me Crazy (TV series) OST》 | 미치겠다 (Crazy) | |
| 2018.05.10 | 《White chocolate》 | White chocolate | SS Feat Sung-joo |
| 2018.08.05 | 《꿀》 | 꿀 | Apollo, 11호, Ekko, Sung-joo |
| 2019.10.9 | 《No Plan》 | No Plan | O.A Feat.사토시, Sung-joo |
| 2019.10.18 | 《No Secrets OST》 | Good Night Guard | Zhou Yixuan, Sung-joo |

== Filmography ==
=== Film ===
| Year | Title | Role | Notes |
|---|---|---|---|
| 2016 | MBA Partners | Lucas | |
| 2017 | Kill Me Please | Bryan | |
| 2019 | Step Up: Year of the Dance | Dal | |

=== Television series ===
| Year | Title | Role | Network | Ref. |
|---|---|---|---|---|
| 2016 | Magical Space-time | Peng Zhendong | Hunan Broadcasting System | |
| 2017 | The Liar and His Lover | Yoo Si-hyun | tvN | |
| 2017 | Live Up to Your Name | Kim Min-jae | tvN | |
| 2018 | You Drive Me Crazy | Yoon Hee-nam | MBC | |
| 2018 | My Secret Terrius | Ra Do-woo | MBC | |

=== Television shows ===
| Year | Title | Role | Episode | Ref. |
|---|---|---|---|---|
| 2015 | Welcome Back to School | Cast member | 44-46 | |
| 2016 | Youth Over Flowers China | Cast Member | | |
| 2018 | Problematic Men | Guest | 185 | |
