= Youth With You season 1 =

2019 Chinese boy group competition show

Youth With You
- Season 1
- Promotional poster
- Starring: Lay Zhang; Li Ronghao; Jolin Tsai; MC Jin; Xu Minghao; After Journey

Release
- Original network: iQIYI
- Original release: January 21 – April 6, 2019

Series chronology
- ← Previous; Idol Producer Next → Season 2

Youth With You (Chinese: 青春有你), also known by its Chinese title Qīng Chūn Yǒu Nǐ or simply QCYN, is a 2019 Chinese male group survival show that premiered on January 21, 2019 on iQIYI. Called Idol Producer Season 2 before filming, it is the second edition of the 2018 male competition show Idol Producer, and the first edition of the survival show Youth With You. It is presented by Lay Zhang, with Li Ronghao, Jolin Tsai, MC Jin, The8 (Xu Minghao), and After Journey serving as the coaches. The show brought together 100 trainees from different entertainment agencies, and only nine of all trainees were selected to debut through viewers' votes. On April 6, 2019, the final nine contestants debuted as UNINE.

== Concept ==
Youth With You brings 100 trainees together who are either from entertainment agencies or aren't signed under any company, and nine trainees will be selected through viewers' votes to form a boy group after weeks of evaluations, group performances, and eliminations.

== Coaches ==
=== Main ===
- Lay Zhang— Production director (PD) and presenter

Lay Zhang served as a representative of the youth producers in Youth With You. He hoped to share his stage experience in this show and helped the trainees to have huge progress. In this program, Lay and the other coaches taught the trainees how to perform better on the stage with a professional and rigorous attitude. He became a strict mentor during the process of their competition. Lay returned as the production director (PD) and presenter from the first season of Idol Producer.

- Li Ronghao — Vocal mentor

Li Ronghao served as a music instructor in Youth With You. He helped trainees become a better idol and shared his experiences to guide them. Li returned as the vocal mentor from Idol Producer.

- Jolin Tsai — Dance mentor

Jolin Tsai was a dance instructor in Youth With You. She shared her experience of performances and gives correct guidance to the trainees. As an "Asian pop queen", Tsai will teach trainees how to master the stage in the show.

- Xu Minghao — Dance trainer

Xu Minghao served as a dance instructor in Youth With You. He taught the trainees by himself and accompany trainees to train. In Youth with You, The8 accompanied trainees and shared his practical experience with them.

- MC Jin — Rap mentor

MC Jin was a rap instructor in Youth With You. He shared his experience and guide the trainees to become a better rapper. Known as the "Chinese rap legend", MC Jin shared his secret of mastering the rhythm of rap. He also learned Chinese with the trainees and work with them together. He returned as the rap mentor from Idol Producer.

- After Journey — Rap mentor

After Journey was a rap instructor in Youth With You. He taught the trainees by himself and regularly check their improvements. After Journey helped the trainees become more professional. In Youth With You, as a rapper, he taught the Chinese rap of the trainees.

=== Art advisory group ===
- Jiang Dawei
- Huang Doudou
- Teng Shichu
- Wang Jieshi

== Contestants ==
Color key

- Left the show
- Top 9 of the week
- Top 9 of the week [Live only]
- Contestants saved by Art Advisory group's vote
- Eliminated in Episode 5
- Eliminated in Episode 8
- Eliminated in Episode 10
- Eliminated in Episode 12
- Final member of UNINE

Company	Name	Age	Judges evaluation		Ranking														
Company	Name	Age	Judges evaluation		E02	E03	E04 (Live votes)	Episode 5		E06	E07 (Live votes)	E08		E09 (Live Votes)	E10		E12		Final
Company	Name	Age	1	2	#	#	#	#	Votes	#	#	#	Votes	#	#	Votes	#	Votes	Final
AFSC Music Entertainment (AFSC音乐)	Wang Yi (王奕)	33	C	D	37	40	25	41	392,737	42	9	20	4,522,275	33	Eliminated				38
SDT Entertainment (SDT娱乐)	Shen Bohuai (沈博怀)	28	D	B	82	66	33	Eliminated											67-96
SDT Entertainment (SDT娱乐)	Yang Zhaoyang (杨朝阳)	27	D	D	66	52	46	Eliminated											67-96
Skylimit Culture (一响天开)	Gu Landi (谷蓝帝)	31	D	D	16	21	51	25	680,922	33	7	26	4,243,969	15	Eliminated				23
Shanghai Film and Television Company (上海影视传媒股份有限公司)	Chen Tao (陈涛)	25	D	D	20	32	11	31	553,694	16	16	18	4,584,018	17	20	3,137,453	16	552,592	16
In Hi Media (中喜合力)	Anthony (安东尼)	28	D	D	22	41	51	29	574,694	28	54	Eliminated							46
In Hi Media (中喜合力)	Deng Bin (邓滨)	29	D	D	83	65	51	28	594,425	39	61	Eliminated							43
In Hi Media (中喜合力)	Manny (曼尼)	27	D	B	85	91	51	Saved		37	45	Eliminated							58
In Hi Media (中喜合力)	Qiu Bohan (邱薄翰)	30	D	A	89	95	51	59	285,884	41	56	Eliminated							53
In Hi Media (中喜合力)	Wang Xinyu (王新宇)	30	D	C	56	81	51	46	342,761	30	42	Eliminated							48
China Star Entertainment (中星娱乐)	Li You (李由)	29	C	C	45	58	51	38	443,310	53	39	Eliminated							54
Yuehua Entertainment (乐华娱乐)	Hu Chunyang (胡春杨)	27	C	D	6	3	9	5	4,377,653	5	2	3	10,531,278	4	5	6,176,167	6	4,427,507	6
Yuehua Entertainment (乐华娱乐)	Hu Wenxuan (胡文煊)	27	C	C	21	19	8	15	1,091,316	15	17	24	4,258,592	13	Eliminated				24
Yuehua Entertainment (乐华娱乐)	Li Wenhan (李汶翰)	32	B	A	2	1	15	1	7,373,402	1	4	1	17,472,473	1	1	9,277,879	1	8,457,091	1
AM8 Entrertainment (亚美娱乐)	Casper (卡斯柏)	35	B	A	7	Left the show													
Individual Trainee	Lian Huaiwei (连淮伟)	28	B	A	3	5	51	6	3,668,394	6	18	6	7,591,084	10	12	4,404,978	10	3,499,722	10
E Star Plus (亿星明加)	Lin Yuzhi (林渝植)	32	C	C	38	74	29	48	339,243	46	32	35	3,905,044	33	Eliminated				31
G&Y Culture (光印文化)	Fu Hongyi (傅弘奕)	32	F	D	59	89	21	Saved		50	31	Eliminated							51
M Academy China (勤嘉文化)	Yu Lingao (于凌傲)	32	C	B	57	42	41	Eliminated											67-96
Star Master Entertainment (匠星娱乐)	Jia Yi (嘉羿)	28	B	A	4	4	6	4	6,025,757	2	19	5	8,431,253	5	6	6,029,017	5	4,768,211	5
Star Master Entertainment (匠星娱乐)	Jin Fan (靳凡)	31	D	B	49	83	32	Eliminated											67-96
Star Master Entertainment (匠星娱乐)	Lin Mo (林陌)	33	C	C	17	16	4	16	1,016,843	14	28	17	4,941,035	16	16	3,327,157	14	890,607	14
Star Master Entertainment (匠星娱乐)	Zhan Yu (展羽)	29	D	B	34	69	25	47	339,864	40	37	Saved		25	Eliminated				33
Star Master Entertainment (匠星娱乐)	Zhen Nan (圳南)	32	C	D	51	77	49	Eliminated											63
CAST PLANET (卡司星球)	Guan Yue (管栎)	32	B	A	8	6	17	3	6,322,775	3	3	2	11,440,233	2	2	7,645,619	4	4,938,914	4
CAST PLANET (卡司星球)	Shen Qunfeng (沈群丰)	29	D	F	58	75	31	42	387,807	45	20	33	4,021,079	25	Eliminated				30
Jiashang Media (嘉尚传媒)	Ke Qinming (柯钦明)	27	F	D	42	76	51	Eliminated											67-96
Jiashang Media (嘉尚传媒)	Wu Zelin (吴泽林)	27	F	F	25	33	16	37	474,599	25	41	34	3,969,025	36	Eliminated				37
Jiashang Media (嘉尚传媒)	Xie Junze (谢俊泽)	27	F	F	77	94	36	Eliminated											67-96
Jiashang Media (嘉尚传媒)	Ye Helin (叶河林)	28	F	D	19	28	51	33	518,850	23	49	Eliminated							42
China Music (国韵文化)	Jin Yongxian (金永先)	30	D	D	71	68	35	Eliminated											67-96
ONE COOL JASCO Entertainment (天加一文化传媒)	Wen Yechen (文邺辰)	26	D	B	61	48	51	44	359,838	51	14	Saved		29	Eliminated				29
ONE COOL JASCO Entertainment (天加一文化传媒)	Yao Mingming (姚明明)	29	C	C	15	8	51	7	2,175,588	9	22	10	6,715,765	13	3	6,531,168	3	4,990,867	3
Show City Times (少城时代)	Deng Chaoyuan (邓超元)	29	D	D	11	9	1	12	1,343,458	12	23	12	6,176,012	8	9	5,480,863	13	2,116,068	13
Show City Times (少城时代)	Hu Jiahao (胡家豪)	29	D	F	78	35	51	54	310,887	38	40	Eliminated							40
Show City Times (少城时代)	Xia Hanyu (夏瀚宇)	29	B	A	63	30	24	20	818,908	11	1	8	6,994,305	12	8	5,603,770	7	3,785,916	7
TMXY Media Entertainment (彤梦心缘)	Li Zonglin (李宗霖)	32	F	D	14	24	51	30	555,597	32	38	32	4,061,633	23	Eliminated				35
Zhejiang Leisure Media Entertainment (从容影视)	Ye Ziming (叶子铭)	30	B	A	60	90	51	34	506,663	54	30	Eliminated							47
Zhejiang Leisure Media Entertainment (从容影视)	Li Zhifan (李之繁)	30	D	B	Left the show														
Ciwen Media (慈文传媒)	Chen Youwei (陈宥维)	28	F	F	1	2	2	2	6,675,058	4	26	4	8,876,127	9	4	6,320,043	8	3,667,518	8
Ciwen Media (慈文传媒)	Deng Zeming (邓泽鸣)	24	Left the show																
New Classics Media Entertainment (新丽传媒)	Sun Zelin (孙泽霖)	27	D	D	40	55	23	43	384,339	31	29	28	4,110,701	25	Eliminated				32
New Smile Film Entertainment (新微笑影视)	Shi Xin (石锌)	32	C	F	97	97	51	Eliminated											67-96
Xshow Entertainment (新美星秀)	Duan Xuyu (段旭宇)	26	D	C	68	86	51	Eliminated											67-96
Asian Stars Media (星之传媒)	Zhou Shiyuan (周士原)	30	C	C	29	15	51	27	627,189	22	15	14	5,563,149	22	14	3,381,245	21	129,333	21
Big Picture Universal (星映环球)	Lin Zheyu (林哲宇)	28	C	B	67	25	6	26	638,214	48	50	Eliminated							50
Big Picture Universal (星映环球)	Qi Zhihao (漆志豪)	33	C	D	94	51	46	56	301,140	61	52	Eliminated							61
Big Picture Universal (星映环球)	Shao Haofan (邵浩帆)	28	C	D	91	29	10	32	553,638	34	33	25	4,256,107	25	Saved		19	254,840	19
Big Picture Universal (星映环球)	Wen Kaiwei (温凯崴)	28	C	C	96	50	40	36	498,249	62	57	Eliminated							62
XCSS Entertainment (星灿盛世)	Chen Bokai (陈柏凯)	26	F	F	28	43	51	Eliminated											67-96
Mountain Culture (等风来工作室)	Wang Jiayi (王加一)	32	B	B	5	7	37	8	2,077,986	18	55	29	4,110,553	31	Eliminated				36
FutureONE Entertainment (未来壹娱乐)	Kou Cong (寇聪)	27	D	B	95	84	51	50	331,088	55	35	Eliminated							57
FutureONE Entertainment (未来壹娱乐)	Liu Yuhang (刘宇航)	28	D	D	80	80	51	Eliminated											67-96
FutureONE Entertainment (未来壹娱乐)	Wu Fei (吴飞)	28	D	D	65	72	51	Eliminated											64-65
FutureONE Entertainment (未来壹娱乐)	Yang Ning (杨宁)	26	D	D	50	70	51	45	356,068	57	46	Eliminated							44
Gramarie Entertainment (果然娱乐)	Tang Shuya (唐书亚)	28	F	F	81	85	14	Eliminated											67-96
Gramarie Entertainment (果然娱乐)	Wu Chengze (吴承泽)	26	D	F	12	17	51	22	789,572	26	27	27	4,120,774	38	19	3,185,346	22	103,491	22
Gramarie Entertainment (果然娱乐)	Yang Gen (杨亘)	30	D	F	53	49	43	Eliminated											67-96
Gramarie Entertainment (果然娱乐)	Zhao Tiange (赵天戈)	33	F	F	72	26	51	Eliminated											67-96
Boli Culture Entertainment (波利文化)	Li Lian (李炼)	26	F	F	92	87	51	Eliminated											67-96
Haohan Entertainment (浩瀚娱乐)	Zhou Chuanjun (周川珺)	29	F	F	46	73	21	52	311,918	47	35	Eliminated							52
Ocean Butterflies Music (海蝶國際集團)	Xu Bingchao (徐炳超)	29	B	D	43	53	5	35	498,427	17	13	16	5,418,276	20	Eliminated				26
White Media China (白色系)	Bo Yuan (伯远)	33	F	B	36	54	49	53	311,110	49	47	Saved		31	Eliminated				34
White Media China (白色系)	Meng En (蒙恩)	32	F	F	31	47	51	Eliminated											67-96
White Media China (白色系)	Zhuo Yuan (卓沅)	27	F	C	62	59	46	58	285,884	44	61	Eliminated							39
Sony Music (索尼音乐娱乐)	Chen Yunong (陈雨浓)	32	D	D	41	71	44	40	429,249	59	58	Eliminated							59
Sony Music (索尼音乐娱乐)	Cui Shaopeng (崔少鹏)	29	D	C	84	88	44	49	332,718	60	43	Eliminated							60
Sony Music (索尼音乐娱乐)	Su Yuhang (苏宇航)	32	D	B	93	79	12	51	326,056	52	44	Eliminated							49
Sony Music (索尼音乐娱乐)	Xu Fangzhou (徐方舟)	31	C	A	64	23	51	23	777,509	29	34	31	4,102,512	25	17	3,281,175	18	282,936	18
Y Star Entertainment (翌星传媒)	Lu Junjie (卢俊杰)	27	D	F	87	96	37	Eliminated											67-96
Shanghai You Hug Media Company (耀客娱乐)	Huang Hongxuan (黄宏轩)	29	D	D	76	92	51	Eliminated											67-96
Huaying Entertainment (华影艺星)	Gao Xiaosong (高晓松)	28	F	F	39	78	28	Eliminated											67-96
Huace Media Group (华策集团)	Jiang Shenmin (姜圣民)	32	C	A	74	34	Left the show												
Huace Media Group (华策集团)	Lin Minsheng (林敏生)	34	C	C	90	63	51	Eliminated											67-96
Huace Media Group (华策集团)	Qi Haoran (齐浩然)	31	D	C	55	31	51	Eliminated											64-65
Huace Media Group (华策集团)	Shao Qiming (邵奇明)	27	D	C	88	45	51	Eliminated											67-96
Huace Media Group (华策集团)	Tian Dao (田岛)	30	D	C	69	44	51	Eliminated											67-96
Huace Media Group (华策集团)	Yin Shi (殷实)	26	D	D	75	38	51	57	294,064	36	60	Eliminated							41
OACA Entertainment (觉醒东方)	Chen You (陈佑)	27	D	F	33	61	51	55	305,983	58	59	Eliminated							56
OACA Entertainment (觉醒东方)	Daniel (丹尼尔)	30	D	D	30	46	33	Eliminated											67-96
OACA Entertainment (觉醒东方)	Feng Junjie (冯俊杰)	32	C	A	13	18	19	14	1,143,640	21	24	22	4,293,977	33	Saved		20	199,945	20
OACA Entertainment (觉醒东方)	He Changxi (何昶希)	28	C	A	10	12	51	9	1,775,620	13	10	11	6,563,940	6	13	4,297,992	9	3,531,188	9
CNC Records (超能唱片)	Feng Tianhao (冯天豪)	29	C	B	86	37	29	Eliminated											67-96
CNC Records (超能唱片)	Li Chenyang (李晨阳)	27	C	C	70	36	51	Eliminated											67-96
Bates MeThinks (达意美施)	Chen Sijian (陈思键)	27	B	C	32	14	51	18	943,171	24	20	21	4,521,596	21	18	3,226,574	15	621,419	15
AppMagics (迈吉传媒)	Ding Feijun (丁飞俊)	29	D	F	24	27	18	39	438,383	35	12	30	4,110,363	25	Eliminated				27
IV Idea Picture (青藤文化)	Wu Ming (吳銘)	27	F	D	79	93	51	Eliminated											67-96
IV Idea Picture (青藤文化)	Xu Longhan (许珑瀚)	26	F	D	54	22	51	17	955,755	20	11	23	4,280,172	36	Eliminated				28
Banana Entertainment (香蕉娱乐)	Che Huixuan (车慧轩)	30	F	A	27	39	51	24	743,739	43	53	Eliminated							45
Banana Entertainment (香蕉娱乐)	Li Huangyi (李皇逸)	32	D	D	47	82	51	Eliminated											66
Banana Entertainment (香蕉娱乐)	Wang Zhe (王喆)	29	F	F	9	10	20	13	1,336,766	27	48	15	5,529,867	18	15	3,361,851	17	392,230	17
Mavericks Entertainment (麦锐娱乐)	Lou Jiongze (楼炅择)	27	D	C	44	56	51	Eliminated											67-96
Mavericks Entertainment (麦锐娱乐)	Peng Changhua (彭昶桦)	28	C	B	35	57	42	Eliminated											67-96
Mavericks Entertainment (麦锐娱乐)	Yao Chi (姚弛)	28	C	C	18	11	51	10	1,749,405	7	6	7	7,120,995	6	10	4,632,516	12	3,239,468	12
Mavericks Entertainment (麦锐娱乐)	Zhou Xiangheng (周湘恒)	31	B	B	52	64	37	Eliminated											67-96
BG Project (黑金计划)	Li Zhenning (李振宁)	31	D	C	48	62	3	21	807,767	10	25	13	5,860,409	11	7	5,762,839	2	5,655,150	2
BG Project (黑金计划)	Ou Tianrui (区天瑞)	32	D	D	73	67	51	Eliminated											67-96
BG Project (黑金计划)	Shi Mingze (师铭泽)	28	D	D	23	20	51	19	904,979	19	8	19	4,453,715	19	Eliminated				25
BG Project (黑金计划)	Shi Zhan (施展)	28	D	D	26	13	13	11	1,363,804	8	5	9	6,876,214	3	11	4,554,806	11	3,323,160	11
BG Project (黑金计划)	Yao Bolan (姚博岚)	29	D	F	98	60	27	60	285,453	56	50	Eliminated							55

=== Top 9 ===
	E02	E03	E04 (Live Votes)	E05	E06	E07 (Live Votes)	E08	E09 (Live Votes)	E10	E12
1	Chen Youwei (陈宥维)	Li Wenhan (李汶翰)	Deng Chaoyuan (邓超元)	Li Wenhan (李汶翰)	Li Wenhan (李汶翰)	Xia Hanyu (夏瀚宇)	Li Wenhan (李汶翰)	Li Wenhan (李汶翰)	Li Wenhan (李汶翰)	Li Wenhan (李汶翰)
2	Li Wenhan (李汶翰)	Chen Youwei (陈宥维)	Chen Youwei (陈宥维)	Chen Youwei (陈宥维)	Jia Yi (嘉羿)	Hu Chunyang (胡春杨)	Guan Yue (管栎)	Guan Yue (管栎)	Guan Yue (管栎)	Li Zhenning (李振宁)
3	Lian Huaiwei (连淮伟)	Hu Chunyang (胡春杨)	Li Zhenning (李振宁)	Guan Yue (管栎)	Guan Yue (管栎)	Guan Yue (管栎)	Hu Chunyang (胡春杨)	Shi Zhan (施展)	Yao Mingming (姚明明)	Yao Mingming (姚明明)
4	Jia Yi (嘉羿)	Jia Yi (嘉羿)	Lin Mo (林陌)	Jia Yi (嘉羿)	Chen Youwei (陈宥维)	Li Wenhan (李汶翰)	Chen Youwei (陈宥维)	Hu Chunyang (胡春杨)	Chen Youwei (陈宥维)	Guan Yue (管栎)
5	Wang Jiayi (王加一)	Lian Huaiwei (连淮伟)	Xu Bingchao (徐炳超)	Hu Chunyang (胡春杨)	Hu Chunyang (胡春杨)	Shi Zhan (施展)	Jia Yi (嘉羿)	Jia Yi (嘉羿)	Hu Chunyang (胡春杨)	Jia Yi (嘉羿)
6	Hu Chunyang (胡春杨)	Guan Yue (管栎)	Lin Zheyu (林哲宇) & Jia Yi (嘉羿)	Lian Huaiwei (连淮伟)	Lian Huaiwei (连淮伟)	Lian Huaiwei (连淮伟)	Lian Huaiwei (连淮伟)	He Changxi (何昶希) & Yao Chi (姚弛)	Jia Yi (嘉羿)	Hu Chunyang (胡春杨)
7	Casper (卡斯柏)	Wang Jiayi (王加一)	Lin Zheyu (林哲宇) & Jia Yi (嘉羿)	Yao Mingming (姚明明)	Yao Chi (姚弛)	Gu landi (谷蓝帝)	Yao Chi (姚弛)	He Changxi (何昶希) & Yao Chi (姚弛)	Li Zhenning (李振宁)	Xia Hanyu (夏瀚宇)
8	Guan Yue (管栎)	Yao Mingming (姚明明)	Hu Wenxuan (胡文煊)	Wang Jiayi (王加一)	Shi Zhan (施展)	Shi Mingze (师铭泽)	Xia Hanyu (夏瀚宇)	Deng Chaoyuan (邓超元)	Xia Hanyu (夏瀚宇)	Chen Youwei (陈宥维)
9	Wang Zhe (王喆)	Deng Chaoyuan (邓超元)	Hu Chunyang (胡春杨)	He Changxi (何昶希)	Yao Mingming (姚明明)	Wang Yi (王奕)	Shi Zhan (施展)	Chen Youwei (陈宥维)	Deng Chaoyuan (邓超元)	He Changxi (何昶希)

=== Elimination Chart ===
Color key

Final members UNINE
Contestants eliminated in the final episode
Contestants eliminated in the third elimination
Contestants eliminated in the second elimination
Contestants eliminated in the first elimination
Contestants left the show

Youth With You Season 1 Contestants
Li Wenhan (李汶翰)	Li Zhenning (李振宁)	Yao Mingming (姚明明)	Guan Yue (管栎)	Jia Yi (嘉羿)
Hu Chunyang (胡春杨)	Xia Hanyu (夏瀚宇)	Chen Youwei (陈宥维)	He Changxi (何昶希)	Lian Huaiwei (连淮伟)
Shi Zhan (施展)	Yao Chi (姚弛)	Deng Chaoyuan (邓超元)	Lin Mo (林陌)	Chen Sijian (陈思键)
Chen Tao (陈涛)	Wang Zhe (王喆)	Xu Fangzhou (徐方舟)	Shao Haofan (邵浩帆)	Feng Junjie (冯俊杰)
Zhou Shiyuan (周士原)	Wu Chengze (吴承泽)	Gu Landi (谷蓝帝)	Hu Wenxuan (胡文煊)	Shi Mingze (师铭泽)
Xu Bingchao (徐炳超)	Ding Feijun (丁飞俊)	Xu Longhan (许珑瀚)	Wen Yechen (文邺辰)	Shen Qunfeng (沈群丰)
Lin Yuzhi (林渝植)	Sun Zelin (孙泽霖)	Zhan Yu (展羽)	Bo Yuan (伯远)	Li Zonglin (李宗霖)
Wang Jiayi (王加一)	Wu Zelin (吴泽林)	Wang Yi (王奕)	Zhuo Yuan (卓沅)	Hu Jiahao (胡家豪)
Yin Shi (殷实)	Ye Helin (叶河林)	Deng Bin (邓滨)	Yan Ning (杨宁)	Che Huixuan (车慧轩)
Anthony (安东尼)	Ye Ziming (叶子铭)	Wang Xinyu (王新宇)	Su Yuhang (苏宇航)	Lin Zheyu (林哲宇)
Fu Hongyi (傅弘奕)	Zhou Chuanjun (周川珺)	Qiu Bohan (邱薄翰)	Li You (李由)	Yao Bolan (姚博岚)
Chen You (陈佑)	Kou Cong (寇聪)	Manny (曼尼)	Chen Yunong (陈雨浓)	Cui Shaopeng (崔少鹏)
Qi Zhihao (漆志豪)	Wen Kaiwei (温凯崴)	Zhen Nan (圳南)	Wu Fei (吴飞)	Qi Haoran (齐浩然)
Li Huangyi (李皇逸)	Shen Bohuai (沈博怀)	Yang Zhaoyang (沈博怀)	Yu Lingao (于凌傲)	Jin Fan (靳凡)
Ke Qinming (柯钦明)	Xie Junze (谢俊泽)	Jin Yongxian (金永先)	Shi Xin (石锌)	Duan Xuyu (段旭宇)
Chen Bokai (陈柏凯)	Liu Yuhang (刘宇航)	Tang Shuya (唐书亚)	Yang Gen (杨亘)	Zhao Tiange (赵天戈)
Li Lian (李炼)	Meng En (蒙恩)	Lu Junjie (卢俊杰)	Huang Hongxuan (黄宏轩)	Gao Xiaosong (高晓松)
Lin Minsheng (林敏生)	Shao Qiming (邵奇明)	Tian Dao (田岛)	Daniel (丹尼尔)	Feng Tianhao (冯天豪)
Li Chenyang (李晨阳)	Wu Ming (吳銘)	Lou Jiongze (楼炅择)	Peng Changhua (彭昶桦)	Zhou Xiangheng (周湘恒)
Ou Tianrui (区天瑞)	Casper (卡斯柏)	Jiang Shengmin (姜圣民)	Deng Zeming (邓泽鸣)	Li Zhifan (李之繁)

== Episodes ==
=== Episode 1 ===
The trainees enter the main stage and seat themselves according to their rankings from the initial 24-hour pick results displayed on the small screen. The top 60 trainees are arranged in the first waiting area, while the last 39 trainees must leave and sit in the second waiting area, which is an unheated glass box outside the main recording set. They watch the performances on a monitor. The trainees begin performing in groups. The performances are grouped according to their companies. The instructors then evaluate for the initial rating of A, B, C, D or F based on the comprehensive ability of the trainees, with A being the highest and F being the lowest.

=== Episode 2 ===
The initial grade evaluation of the trainees continues. After the performance of the 99 trainees, there were 11 people in Class B, 24 in Class C, 44 in Class D, and 20 in Class F. No one in this season was assigned to Class A in the initial rating, which broke the precedent. The first task was released: perform the theme song of the programme. Trainees need to learn all the contents and dance of the theme song, "Youth With You (青春有你)" in the assigned classes within three days with other trainees of the same level. The trainees allocate the dormitory according to the initial grade. Instructor Xu Minghao makes a late night visit to the trainees practicing and gives them guidance for learning the dance.

=== Episode 3 ===
The vocal and dance training of the first task continues. After three days of training, the trainees receive a single opportunity to record an individual performance of the theme song and received a re-evaluation from the instructors. The results of the grade evaluation are 10 in class A, 14 in class B, 20 in class C, 31 in class D, and 24 in class F.

After the re-evaluation, the trainees perform the rehearsal of the theme song stage performance according to their new rankings. Lay Zhang, decides to move an additional 12 trainees to higher ranks after watching their rehearsal. The final grade evaluation results are 13 in Class A, 15 in Class B, 20 in Class C, 31 in Class D, and 20 in Class F. This final rating determines the position of the trainees on the theme song performance stage.

The A-ranked trainees each perform their killing part for the theme song, and the other class trainees voted for who they wanted as a center position for the theme song. Zhang Yixing makes the final decision to break the tie between Li Wenhan and Lian Huaiwei. Li Wenhan was selected as the center position.

Each trainee gets 5 minutes to talk to his family before the Spring Festival.

After recording "Youth With You", the second challenge is revealed. The trainees will be put into 16 teams to perform 8 songs. Two teams will be performing and competing against each other for each of the 8 songs: A-Mei's "Fire (火)", HIT-5's "Fight (斗)", Lay Zhang‘s "NAMANANA", Taeyang's "Eyes Nose Lips", Silence Wang's "A beautiful smile(一笑倾城)", "A Neighbor Named Taishan(隔壁泰山)", Gen Neo's "Reverse", and "DREAM".

Li Wenhan receives the most votes for who each trainee wishes to perform with the most and earns the right to choose his song and teammates. The additional teams and songs are decided based on a random ball draw.

=== Episode 4 ===
The group's leaders receive their results from Lay Zhang before the beginning of the performance. After receiving the result, the group leader can choose to look it by himself or with his group members.

Eight groups that successfully go on the stage to perform live and get the votes from 600 youth producers on site. After each group finished their performance, youth producers on site can vote for their favorite trainee. If the youth producer is not satisfied with the performance of a certain group, they can abstain from voting. Deng Chaoyuan from "DREAM" Team B wins the most votes overall with 199 votes. Each trainee's obtained live votes are multiplied by 100 and then added into the online votes to determine the Top 60. Because of no performances on stage, the other eight groups receive zero additional votes from this mission.

=== Episode 5 ===
The top 60 trainees with the most votes are announced, starting from rank 59. Additional footage of trainee activities is shown between ranking announcements. The trainees are polled for the "most handsome" and "who I would like to introduce to my little sister". Mavericks trainee Yao Chi is selected as the "top visual".

The trainees and program staff have a game of tug-of-war, in order to win meat and dishes for a hot pot. If the teams of trainees win the round, everyone will receive a corresponding reward. Because the trainees express gratitude towards the staff, they are rewarded the entire hot pot prize and everyone makes the trip.

Instructor MC Jin hosts a rap class for interested trainees. They are given an assignment beforehand to write lyrics for one of three accompaniments prepared by MC Jin tutor and present their raps to the rest of the trainees.

Li Wenhan claims rank 1, while Yao Bolan is revealed as rank 60, saving himself from elimination. The other contenders were Wu Fei, Qi Haoran and Zhen Nan. In addition, the Artist Advisory Council evaluates trainees' potential based on their group performances, thus recommending 10 trainees to advance to the next stage of the competition. 8 recommended trainees are already in the top 60 (marked on a pink background), but Manny and Fu Hongyi are saved. The remaining time is given to the trainees to say their goodbyes.

Episode 6

Instructor Li Ronghao hosts a songwriting class for interested trainees. Li Ronghao asks the trainees to show their original works first and gives them feedback. Each trainee was then assigned genre that they were not good at, and given three days to write a song in that genre before presenting their work.

The position evaluation mission provides the trainees with three different roles (vocal, dance, rap) for them to choose from, and the trainees will select the corresponding songs according to their chosen group role. There are five songs in the vocal category:(A-Mei's "You Love Me (你是爱我的)", William Wei's "Wait Slowly (慢慢等)", Eric Chou's "what's up (怎么了)", Lala Hsu's "Disappointed Desert (失落沙洲)" and Li Ronghao's "Ears (耳朵)"; four songs in the rap category: (GAI 周延's "Big Shot (大人物)", Will Pan's "Coming Home", A-Mei's "Brave" and Antonin Leopold Dvoárk's "Inner World"); and three songs in the dance category: (NICKTHEREAL's "Turn Up", Jolin Tsai's "Chivalry (骑士精神)", and William Chan's "A Trait of Jianghu (一笔江湖)".

The trainees with higher rankings pick their songs first, and each song is available until the member limit is reached. The winning member of each group will gain 50,000 votes, and the winning trainee in each category will receive an extra 100,000 votes, totaling to 150,000 votes. The trainee's accumulated votes are reset to zero for this challenge.

The trainees decide on the group leaders and center positions and begin practice and receive advice from the mentors. The groups for "你是爱我的(You Love Me)“, "Turn Up", "大人物(Big Shot)”, and "慢慢等(Wait Slowly)“ perform.

=== Episode 7 ===
Due to a sudden ban on broadcasting light or brightly dyed hair, airing for this episode was delayed for a week.

Jiang Dawei, a member of the Artist Advisory Council, gives an open class to all the trainees after the second performance, sharing his insights into music according to his experiences. At the end of the open class, Jiang Dawei also announced a charitable activity called “Reading Youth”. The trainees will need to share and recommend their favorite books before the release of rankings in the second performance group.

The remaining performance is aired. Afterward, the live audience votes are calculated and revealed to the trainees. Xia Hanyu from "你是爱我的(You Love Me)“ receives the most votes overall and wins the vocal category with 362 votes, Hu Chunyang from "Inner World" wins the rap category with 272 votes, and Guan Yue from "Turn Up" wins the dance category with 228 votes. They all received 150,000 additional votes. The first place member in each group receives 50,000 votes. Lastly, every trainee also gets the live votes they received from their performance added to their online votes to determine the ranks for Top 35.

=== Episode 8 ===
The next task is revealed: a concept evaluation performance. This mission will help the trainees find their own style. Five new songs written by both national and international top music producers and production teams are offered. The trainees will become the original singers for those songs. The youth producers voted for which concept they believed was most suitable for trainees from February 22 to 26, 2019. The second-ranking announcement will be held during the training of this task. Therefore, only the top 35 trainees are eligible to stand on the stage, while the rest of the trainees will leave the show during training, and they cannot participate in the performance. Before the second-ranking was announced, each group is temporarily divided into two groups for training, and each group selects the team leader and the center position.

Trainees each receive an envelope from Lay Zhang and move to the corresponding training room according to the number on the song card. The trainees who receive the same number will be in the same concept. After all the trainees find their own groups, Lay Zhang reveals the song assigned to each group. The 5 songs are, "Maze (迷宫)"(cute pop) "Tinder (火种)" (future pop), "I'm Sorry"(pop ballad), "TIME"(hip hop) and "Rebuild (重塑)"(future trap).

As practice begins, the instructors visit each group to check in. Jolin Tsai and Xu Minghao sit down and have an encouraging talk with the "Maze (迷宫)" group, who are losing spirit due to only 4 members ranking above 35.

Additionally, trainees participate in more activities. They visit a center for autistic children to volunteer and accompany the kids for a day. They also play basketball on an acupuncture mat, with team members wearing the basketball hoop.

The trainees sing "Goodbye" by A-Yue before Lay Zhang walks in and second ranking announcements begin. Due to the longer voting period, 263 million votes were accumulated. Li Wenhan remains rank 1 by a landslide of 6 million votes higher than rank 2 Guan Yue. Lin Yuzhi is revealed to be rank 35, saving himself from elimination. Additionally, the Artist Advisory Council selects six trainees to move on to the next stage. Three recommended trainees are already in the Top 35, but Bo Yuan, Wen Yechen and Zhan Yu are saved.

=== Episode 9 ===
After the second-ranking was announced, 38 trainees are regrouped according to the remaining group members. Among the five groups, only "TIME" have the correct number of members and do not need to adjust. "Rebuild (重塑)" must drop 3 members, "Tinder (火种)" must drop 2 members, and "I'm Sorry" must drop 1 member. The eliminated members will join the "Maze （迷宫）" group, who only have 2 original members remaining. The teams decide which members will leave by ranking each member in the group based on their suitability to the song. The trainees with the lowest rankings (least suitable) are voted out.

The teams perform and practice footage is shown. Guan Yue and Ding Feijun cheer up the new members of the "Maze (迷宫)" team, who are disappointed about being voted out. "TIME" team, who are all below rank 20, have an honest discussion about feeling the hardships of the program.

After the performances, each youth producer audiences will vote according to trainees’ performance on stage. Each youth producer has two votes. First, the youth producer will select the "most recommended" group from the five groups of concept evaluation teams and then select a "most recommended" trainee from the "most recommended" group. The group that has the most "most recommended" votes will receive a reward of 500,000 votes, and the rule of the reward boost value is obtained by the "most recommended" trainee in the group. The top three trainees from the top two groups are left unrevealed. They are Shi Zhan, Guan Yue, and Li Wenhan. Their result is not revealed until the 3rd ranking announcement.

=== Episode 10 ===
In this episode, the third-ranking was announced. The ranking results are based on the number of online votes from the youth producers and concept performance stages from March 15 to March 23, 2019, with a total of 118,430,860 votes. The top 20 trainees will enter the final stage and perform.

Wang Jieshi from the Artist Advisory Council gives all the trainees an open class to share his singing experiences. At the end of the open class, Teacher Wang Jieshi announces the fourth charitable activity called "Youth, Respect, and Accompanied with You". Wang Jieshi and all the trainees go to the Kangyuxuan Club Beijing Sunhe Senior Apartment to hold a birthday party for the elderly residents. The trainees are divided into two groups in this activity, one is responsible for accompanying the elderly, and the other is responsible for preparing talent shows for the birthday party.

The trainees also complete an obstacle course, trying to move as many gift boxes as possible while going through a ball pit. The trainees anonymously write letters to each other, but then read them out loud.

The ranking announcements begin. The "Rebuild (重塑)" team wins with 270 total votes, earning each member an additional 50,000 votes. Li Wenhan wins the individual vote with 129 votes, earning an additional 200,000 votes and retains his rank 1 position. Lian Huaiwei drops from rank 6 to rank 12, shocking all trainees. The final 20th spot is between Chen Tao and Gu Landi, and Chen Tao is revealed to be rank 20. The Artist Advisory Council additionally selects three outstanding trainees. Zhou Shiyuan is already in the Top 20, but Feng Junjie and Shao Haofan are saved.

The last mission is revealed: Final Stage. This assessment is the final stage performance before the final nine people form a group. The 22 trainees are divided into two groups to perform two more original songs. The lowest ranked trainees are able to pick their song and position first; however, higher ranked trainees are allowed to replace an already occupied position with themselves.

=== Episode 11 ===
A letter from the tutor: Each tutor writes an encouraging letter to all the trainees and read them at the beginning.

The release of the mentor cooperation stage task: this task is a special stage with no assessment, gathered together all the tutors of the program and the coaches and trainees to complete a collaboration stage. This time the rule of grouping is that trainees will send message to the tutors they want to perform within 15 minutes, and each trainee can only send one message to a certain tutor. If the tutor replies "I can" to the trainees within a limited time, they will be able to form a team. Jolin Tsai and Xu Minghao were not present at the time, so Li Ronghao and After journey replied on their behalf.

Each group's practice is shown first, and then their performance. After journey pranks his group and pretends to be upset so they can feel the bitterness of the song; however, the trainees prank him in return with Deng Chaoyuan storming out of the room, only to return with a birthday cake. Li Wenhan falls ill and cannot perform the collaboration stage with Lay Zhang, causing the group to redistribute positions at the last minute.

=== Episode 12 ===
This episode is the final episode of this season, and it is also a live broadcast. He Jiong becomes a special MC for the night. Nine Percent (sans Cai Xukun) also attends the finale as special guests to show they support.

The episode begins with trainees from the 22 standing in front of the rank 1 seat and talking about their experiences and hardships towards their dreams. After their speech, they yell "Can I do it?", and the remaining trainees shout back words of encouragement.

The live broadcast stars and all 99 trainees return to the stage to perform "Youth With You (青春有你)" live. The name of the debuting group is announced to be "UNINE".

After introductions from the mentors, Artist Advisory Council, and Nine Percent, the broadcast cuts to the selection of "Warm Color"'s center position. The selection process is done by the group performing the chorus, with each trainee taking the role of center once, then a closed voting process within the members of that group. The contenders for the center are Guan Yue and Jia Yi. Cutting back to the live broadcast, where "Warm Color"'s performers appear onstage, and Guan Yue is revealed as the center of the song.

"The Last Day" is performed next and goes through the same process center selection process, where the top 2 choices were Li Wenhan and He Changxi. Li Wenhan is revealed to be the center.

The trainees are also set to perform a special song "I Remember You". Once again, they must be evaluated, and only selected trainees will be able to perform the special stage. They complete a rehearsal assessment and were invited individually into a dark room standing in front of a screen. They are told they cannot go on stage this time; however, it is revealed to be a set up for video messages from their families. All 22 trainees perform an emotional special stage.

Another clip is shown that looks back on the charitable work and tasks the trainees did throughout the program. Jiang Dawei and Lay Zhang perform a collaborated remix of the theme song for "Journey to the West."

The announcement of UNINE begins. The rankings are announced from 8 to 1, and each trainee walks down the stage and gives a speech of thanks before going to their seat. Xia Hanyu is noted as having the biggest rise, as he began this season at rank 79 and debuts as rank 7. Li Zhenning also soars into rank 2. He Changxi is revealed as the 9th member, taking the last spot in UNINE.

A recap of unaired footage is played, including clips of trainees first entering and meeting each other on the evaluation stage, celebrating Chinese New Year, celebrating birthdays, group meals, and saying goodbye to each other in the dorms. After the memories are shown, the episode returns to the live broadcast where He Jiong and Lay Zhang wrap up the show.

== Mission ==
=== Mission 1: Group evaluation ===
Color key

- Winner
- Leader
- Center

Song	Original Artist	Group	Name	Rank
火 (Fire)	A-Mei (張惠妹)	Group A	He Changxi	51
火 (Fire)	A-Mei (張惠妹)	Group A	Lin Minsheng	51
火 (Fire)	A-Mei (張惠妹)	Group A	Tian Dao	51
火 (Fire)	A-Mei (張惠妹)	Group A	Jiang Shengmin	51
火 (Fire)	A-Mei (張惠妹)	Group A	Yin Shi	51
火 (Fire)	A-Mei (張惠妹)	Group A	Qi Haoran	51
火 (Fire)	A-Mei (張惠妹)	Group A	Shao Qiming	51
火 (Fire)	A-Mei (張惠妹)	Group B	Su Yuhang	12
火 (Fire)	A-Mei (張惠妹)	Group B	Cui Shaopeng	44
火 (Fire)	A-Mei (張惠妹)	Group B	Chen Yunong	44
火 (Fire)	A-Mei (張惠妹)	Group B	Lin Zheyu	7
火 (Fire)	A-Mei (張惠妹)	Group B	Qi Zhihao	46
火 (Fire)	A-Mei (張惠妹)	Group B	Wen Kaiwei	40
火 (Fire)	A-Mei (張惠妹)	Group B	Shao Haofan	10
斗 (Fight)	HIT-5	Group A	Feng Tianhao	29
斗 (Fight)	HIT-5	Group A	Wu Zelin	16
斗 (Fight)	HIT-5	Group A	Daniel	33
斗 (Fight)	HIT-5	Group A	Fu Hongyi	21
斗 (Fight)	HIT-5	Group A	Yao Bolan	27
斗 (Fight)	HIT-5	Group A	Yu Lingao	41
斗 (Fight)	HIT-5	Group A	Zhou Chuanjun	21
斗 (Fight)	HIT-5	Group B	Yang Ning	51
斗 (Fight)	HIT-5	Group B	Hu Jiahao	51
斗 (Fight)	HIT-5	Group B	Chen Bokai	51
斗 (Fight)	HIT-5	Group B	Chen You	51
斗 (Fight)	HIT-5	Group B	Zhao Tiange	51
斗 (Fight)	HIT-5	Group B	Li Lian	51
NAMANANA	Lay	Group A	Lin Mo	4
NAMANANA	Lay	Group A	Feng Junjie	19
NAMANANA	Lay	Group A	Hu Wenxuan	6
NAMANANA	Lay	Group A	Zhuo Yuan	46
NAMANANA	Lay	Group A	Bo Yuan	49
NAMANANA	Lay	Group B	Yao Mingming	51
NAMANANA	Lay	Group B	Shi Xin	51
NAMANANA	Lay	Group B	Li You	51
NAMANANA	Lay	Group B	Duan Xuyu	51
紅薔薇白玫瑰 ( Eyes Nose Lips )	G.E.M (Taeyang)	Group A	Ou Tianrui	51
紅薔薇白玫瑰 ( Eyes Nose Lips )	G.E.M (Taeyang)	Group A	Huang Hongxuan	51
紅薔薇白玫瑰 ( Eyes Nose Lips )	G.E.M (Taeyang)	Group A	Anthony	51
紅薔薇白玫瑰 ( Eyes Nose Lips )	G.E.M (Taeyang)	Group A	Gu Landi	51
紅薔薇白玫瑰 ( Eyes Nose Lips )	G.E.M (Taeyang)	Group A	Li Huangyi	51
紅薔薇白玫瑰 ( Eyes Nose Lips )	G.E.M (Taeyang)	Group A	Meng En	51
紅薔薇白玫瑰 ( Eyes Nose Lips )	G.E.M (Taeyang)	Group B	Zhou Xiangheng	37
紅薔薇白玫瑰 ( Eyes Nose Lips )	G.E.M (Taeyang)	Group B	Lu Junjie	37
紅薔薇白玫瑰 ( Eyes Nose Lips )	G.E.M (Taeyang)	Group B	Gao Xiaosong	28
紅薔薇白玫瑰 ( Eyes Nose Lips )	G.E.M (Taeyang)	Group B	Tang Shuya	14
紅薔薇白玫瑰 ( Eyes Nose Lips )	G.E.M (Taeyang)	Group B	Xu Bingchao	5
紅薔薇白玫瑰 ( Eyes Nose Lips )	G.E.M (Taeyang)	Group B	Yang Gen	43
一笑倾城 (A Smile Is Beautiful)	Silence Wang (汪苏泷)	Group A	Wen Yechen	51
一笑倾城 (A Smile Is Beautiful)	Silence Wang (汪苏泷)	Group A	Qiu Bohan	51
一笑倾城 (A Smile Is Beautiful)	Silence Wang (汪苏泷)	Group A	Che Huixuan	51
一笑倾城 (A Smile Is Beautiful)	Silence Wang (汪苏泷)	Group A	Liu Yuhang	51
一笑倾城 (A Smile Is Beautiful)	Silence Wang (汪苏泷)	Group A	Lou Jiongze	51
一笑倾城 (A Smile Is Beautiful)	Silence Wang (汪苏泷)	Group A	Chen Sijian	51
一笑倾城 (A Smile Is Beautiful)	Silence Wang (汪苏泷)	Group B	Shen Bohuai	33
一笑倾城 (A Smile Is Beautiful)	Silence Wang (汪苏泷)	Group B	Wang Yi	25
一笑倾城 (A Smile Is Beautiful)	Silence Wang (汪苏泷)	Group B	Lin Yuzhi	29
一笑倾城 (A Smile Is Beautiful)	Silence Wang (汪苏泷)	Group B	Jin Fan	32
一笑倾城 (A Smile Is Beautiful)	Silence Wang (汪苏泷)	Group B	Chen Tao	11
一笑倾城 (A Smile Is Beautiful)	Silence Wang (汪苏泷)	Group B	Chen Youwei	2
隔壁泰山 (Tarzan Next Door)	A Li Lang (阿里郎)	Group A	Li Wenhan	15
隔壁泰山 (Tarzan Next Door)	A Li Lang (阿里郎)	Group A	Hu Chunyang	9
隔壁泰山 (Tarzan Next Door)	A Li Lang (阿里郎)	Group A	Xia Hanyu	24
隔壁泰山 (Tarzan Next Door)	A Li Lang (阿里郎)	Group A	Jia Yi	6
隔壁泰山 (Tarzan Next Door)	A Li Lang (阿里郎)	Group A	Guan Yue	17
隔壁泰山 (Tarzan Next Door)	A Li Lang (阿里郎)	Group B	Casper	51
隔壁泰山 (Tarzan Next Door)	A Li Lang (阿里郎)	Group B	Wang Xinyu	51
隔壁泰山 (Tarzan Next Door)	A Li Lang (阿里郎)	Group B	Lian Huaiwei	51
隔壁泰山 (Tarzan Next Door)	A Li Lang (阿里郎)	Group B	Ye Ziming	51
隔壁泰山 (Tarzan Next Door)	A Li Lang (阿里郎)	Group B	Kou Cong	51
后退 (Reverse)	Gen Neo	Group A	Li Zhenning	3
后退 (Reverse)	Gen Neo	Group A	Sun Zelin	23
后退 (Reverse)	Gen Neo	Group A	Shi Zan	13
后退 (Reverse)	Gen Neo	Group A	Wang Jiayi	37
后退 (Reverse)	Gen Neo	Group A	Yang Zhaoyang	46
后退 (Reverse)	Gen Neo	Group A	Zhan Yu	25
后退 (Reverse)	Gen Neo	Group A	Zhen Nan	49
后退 (Reverse)	Gen Neo	Group B	Manny	51
后退 (Reverse)	Gen Neo	Group B	Xu Fengzhou	51
后退 (Reverse)	Gen Neo	Group B	Deng Bin	51
后退 (Reverse)	Gen Neo	Group B	Li Chenyang	51
后退 (Reverse)	Gen Neo	Group B	Yaochi	51
后退 (Reverse)	Gen Neo	Group B	Zhou Shiyuan	51
后退 (Reverse)	Gen Neo	Group B	Wu Chengze	51
DREAM	Idol Producer	Group A	Wu Fei	51
DREAM	Idol Producer	Group A	Li Zonglin	51
DREAM	Idol Producer	Group A	Wu Ming	51
DREAM	Idol Producer	Group A	Ke Qinming	51
DREAM	Idol Producer	Group A	Shi Mingze	51
DREAM	Idol Producer	Group A	Xu Longhan	51
DREAM	Idol Producer	Group A	Ye Helin	51
DREAM	Idol Producer	Group B	Jin Yongxian	35
DREAM	Idol Producer	Group B	Deng Chaoyuan	1
DREAM	Idol Producer	Group B	Ding Feijun	18
DREAM	Idol Producer	Group B	Peng Changhua	42
DREAM	Idol Producer	Group B	Shen Qunfeng	31
DREAM	Idol Producer	Group B	Wang Zhe	20
DREAM	Idol Producer	Group B	Xie Junze	36

=== Mission 2: Position evaluation ===
Color key

- Winner
- Leader
- Center
- Leader & Center

Position	Song	Original Artist	Name	Rank within group	Rank within position	Rank overall
Vocal	你是爱我的 (You Do Love Me)	A-Mei (張惠妹)	Feng Junjie	2	12	24
Vocal	你是爱我的 (You Do Love Me)	A-Mei (張惠妹)	Wang Xinyu	4	18	42
Vocal	你是爱我的 (You Do Love Me)	A-Mei (張惠妹)	Bo Yuan	5	20	47
Vocal	你是爱我的 (You Do Love Me)	A-Mei (張惠妹)	Xu Fangzhou	3	15	34
Vocal	你是爱我的 (You Do Love Me)	A-Mei (張惠妹)	Xia Hanyu	1	1	1
Vocal	慢慢等 (Waiting in Patience)	William Wei	Ding Feijun	1	5	12
Vocal	慢慢等 (Waiting in Patience)	William Wei	Chen Yunong	5	25	58
Vocal	慢慢等 (Waiting in Patience)	William Wei	Li Zonglin	4	17	38
Vocal	慢慢等 (Waiting in Patience)	William Wei	Sun Zelin	2	13	41
Vocal	慢慢等 (Waiting in Patience)	William Wei	Zhou Chuanjun	3	16	35
Vocal	怎么了 (What's Wrong?)	Eric Chou 周興哲	Li Wenhan	1	2	4
Vocal	怎么了 (What's Wrong?)	Eric Chou 周興哲	Jiayi	3	10	19
Vocal	怎么了 (What's Wrong?)	Eric Chou 周興哲	Deng Chaoyuan	4	11	23
Vocal	怎么了 (What's Wrong?)	Eric Chou 周興哲	Wang Zhe	5	21	48
Vocal	怎么了 (What's Wrong?)	Eric Chou 周興哲	Chen Tao	2	9	16
Vocal	失落沙洲 (Lost Desert)	Lala Hsu	Yao Chi	1	3	6
Vocal	失落沙洲 (Lost Desert)	Lala Hsu	Lin Zheyu	5	22	50
Vocal	失落沙洲 (Lost Desert)	Lala Hsu	Shao Haofan	3	14	33
Vocal	失落沙洲 (Lost Desert)	Lala Hsu	Yang Ning	4	19	46
Vocal	失落沙洲 (Lost Desert)	Lala Hsu	Zhou Shiyuan	2	8	15
Vocal	耳朵 (Ear)	Li Ronghao	Wen Yechen	3	7	14
Vocal	耳朵 (Ear)	Li Ronghao	Gu Landi	1	4	7
Vocal	耳朵 (Ear)	Li Ronghao	Wang Jiayi	4	23	55
Vocal	耳朵 (Ear)	Li Ronghao	Wen Kaiwei	5	24	57
Vocal	耳朵 (Ear)	Li Ronghao	Xu Bingchao	2	6	13
Dance	Turn Up	NICKTHEREAL	Su Yuhang	5	12	44
Dance	Turn Up	NICKTHEREAL	Li Zhenning	4	7	25
Dance	Turn Up	NICKTHEREAL	Yin Shi	6	16	60
Dance	Turn Up	NICKTHEREAL	Hu Wenxuan	2	4	17
Dance	Turn Up	NICKTHEREAL	Yao Mingming	3	6	22
Dance	Turn Up	NICKTHEREAL	Guan Yue	1	1	3
Dance	骑士精神 (Spirit of the Knights)	Jolin Tsai	Lian Huaiwei	2	5	18
Dance	骑士精神 (Spirit of the Knights)	Jolin Tsai	He Changxi	1	2	10
Dance	骑士精神 (Spirit of the Knights)	Jolin Tsai	Che Huixuan	5	14	53
Dance	骑士精神 (Spirit of the Knights)	Jolin Tsai	Deng Bin	6	17	53
Dance	骑士精神 (Spirit of the Knights)	Jolin Tsai	Lin Mo	3	8	28
Dance	骑士精神 (Spirit of the Knights)	Jolin Tsai	Ye Helin	4	13	49
Dance	一笔江湖 (A Stroke of Jianghu)	William Chan	Fu Hongyi	2	9	31
Dance	一笔江湖 (A Stroke of Jianghu)	William Chan	Kou Cong	3	10	35
Dance	一笔江湖 (A Stroke of Jianghu)	William Chan	Li You	4	11	39
Dance	一笔江湖 (A Stroke of Jianghu)	William Chan	Qiu Bohan	5	15	56
Dance	一笔江湖 (A Stroke of Jianghu)	William Chan	Xu Longhan	1	3	11
Rap	大人物 (Man of Fame)	GAI 周延	Shen Qunfeng	2	5	20
Rap	大人物 (Man of Fame)	GAI 周延	Anthony	5	17	54
Rap	大人物 (Man of Fame)	GAI 周延	Ye Ziming	3	9	30
Rap	大人物 (Man of Fame)	GAI 周延	Cui Shaopeng	4	13	43
Rap	大人物 (Man of Fame)	GAI 周延	Wang Yi	1	4	9
Rap	Coming Home	Will Pan	Shi Zan	1	2	5
Rap	Coming Home	Will Pan	Manny	4	14	45
Rap	Coming Home	Will Pan	Hu Jiahao	3	11	40
Rap	Coming Home	Will Pan	Yao Bolan	5	15	50
Rap	Coming Home	Will Pan	Wu Chengze	2	8	27
Rap	Brave	A-Mei (張惠妹)	Chen Youwei	3	7	26
Rap	Brave	A-Mei (張惠妹)	Chen Sijian	2	5	20
Rap	Brave	A-Mei (張惠妹)	Shi Mingze	1	3	8
Rap	Brave	A-Mei (張惠妹)	Wu Zelin	5	12	41
Rap	Brave	A-Mei (張惠妹)	Zhan Yu	4	11	37
Rap	里世界 (Inner World)	Antonin Leopold Dvoárk	Hu Chunyang	1	1	2
Rap	里世界 (Inner World)	Antonin Leopold Dvoárk	Lin Yuzhi	2	10	32
Rap	里世界 (Inner World)	Antonin Leopold Dvoárk	Chen You	4	19	32
Rap	里世界 (Inner World)	Antonin Leopold Dvoárk	Qi Zhihao	3	17	52
Rap	里世界 (Inner World)	Antonin Leopold Dvoárk	Zhuo Yuan	5	20	61

Ranking of Position evaluation (Only Vocal)
Name	Ranking	Number of Votes
Xia Hanyu	1	150,362
Li Wenhan	2	50,305
Yao Chi	3	50,256
Gu Landi	4	50,251
Ding Feijun	5	50,202
Xu Bingchao	6	240
Wen Yechen	7	236
Zhou Shiyuan	8	218
Chen Tao	9	215
Jia Yi	10	207
Deng Chaoyuan	11	201
Feng Junjie	12	196
Sun Zelin	13	175
Shao Haofan	14	149
Xu Fangzhou	15	147
Zhou Chuanjun	16	133
Li Zonglin	17	115
Wang Xinyu	18	95
Yang Ning	19	84
Bo Yuan	20	82
Wang Zhe	21	78
Lin Zheyu	22	70
Wang Jiayi	23	58
Wen Kaiwei	24	55
Chen Yunong	25	52

Ranking of Position evaluation (Only Dance)
Name	Rank	Number of Votes
Guan Yue	1	150,228
He Changxi	2	50,211
Xu Longhan	3	50,209
Hu Wenxuan	4	210
Lian Huaiwei	5	208
Yao Mingming	6	202
Li Zhenning	7	185
Lin Mo	8	176
Fu Hongyi	9	171
Kou Cong	10	133
Li You	11	109
Su Yuhang	12	88
Ye Helin	13	73
Che Huixuan	14	62
Qiu Bohan	15	57
Yin Shi	16	33
Deng Bin	17	32

Ranking of Position evaluation (Only Rap)
Name	Rank	Number of Votes
Hu Chunyang	1	150,272
Shi Zhan	2	50,258
Shi Mingze	3	50,245
Wang Yi	4	50,214
Chen Sijan	5	203
Shen Qunfeng	5	203
Chen Youwei	7	179
Wu Chengze	8	178
Ye Ziming	9	172
Lin Yuzhi	10	167
Zhan Yu	11	127
Hu Jiahao	12	103
Wu Zelin	13	96
Cui Shaopeng	14	91
Manny	15	85
Yao Bolan	16	70
Qi Zhihao	17	66
Anthony	18	61
Chen You	19	45
Zhou Yuan	20	32

Ranking of Position evaluation
Name	Rank	Number of Votes
Xia Hanyu	1	150,362
Hu Chunyang	2	150,272
Guan Yue	3	150,228
Li Wenhan	4	50,305
Shi Zhan	5	50,258
Yao Chi	6	50,256
Gu Landi	7	50,251
Shi Mingze	8	50,245
Wang Yi	9	50,214
He Changxi	10	50,211
Xu Longhan	11	50,209
Deng Feijun	12	50,202
Xu Bingchao	13	240
Wen Yechen	14	236
Zhou Shiyuan	15	218
Chen Tao	16	215
Hu Wenxuan	17	210
Lian Huaiwei	18	208
Jia Yi	19	207
Chen Sijan	20	203
Shen Qunfeng	20	203
Yao Mingming	22	202
Deng Chaoyuan	23	201
Feng Junjie	24	196
Li Zhenning	25	185
Chen Youwei	26	179
Wu Chengze	27	178
Lin Mo	28	176
Sun Zelin	29	175
Ye Ziming	30	172
Fu Hongyi	31	171
Lin Yuzhi	32	167
Shao Haofan	33	149
Xu Fangzhou	34	147
Kou Cong	35	133
Zhou Chuanjun	35	133
Zhan Yu	37	127
Li Zonglin	38	115
Li You	39	109
Hu Jiahao	40	103
Wu Zelin	41	96
Wang Xinyu	42	95
Cui Shaopeng	43	91
Su Yuhang	44	88
Manny	45	85
Yang Ning	46	84
Bo Yuan	47	82
Wang Zhe	48	78
Ye Helin	49	73
Lin Zheyu	50	70
Yao Bolan	50	70
Qi Zhouhao	52	66
Che Huixuan	53	62
Anthony	54	61
Wang Jiayi	55	58
Qiu Bohan	56	57
Wen Kaiwei	57	55
Chen Yunong	58	52
Cen You	59	45
Yin Shi	60	33
Deng Bin	61	32
Zhou Yuan	61	32

=== Mission 3: Concept evaluation ===
Color key

- Winner
- Leader
- Center

Lists of Concept Evaluation (Before adjustment)
Type	Song	Group	Name
Future trap pop	重塑 Rebuild	Group A	Li Wenhan
Future trap pop	重塑 Rebuild	Group A	He Changxi
Future trap pop	重塑 Rebuild	Group A	Chen You
Future trap pop	重塑 Rebuild	Group A	Hu Chunyang
Future trap pop	重塑 Rebuild	Group A	Li Zhenning
Future trap pop	重塑 Rebuild	Group A	Wu Chengze
Future trap pop	重塑 Rebuild	Group A	Xu Bingchao
Future trap pop	重塑 Rebuild	Group B	Bo Yuan
Future trap pop	重塑 Rebuild	Group B	Li Zhenning
Future trap pop	重塑 Rebuild	Group B	Kou Cong
Future trap pop	重塑 Rebuild	Group B	Shi Mingze
Future trap pop	重塑 Rebuild	Group B	Wang Zhe
Future trap pop	重塑 Rebuild	Group B	Yao Mingming
Future trap pop	重塑 Rebuild	Group B	Zhou Chuanjun
Hip Hop	Time	Group A	Xu Fangzhou
Hip Hop	Time	Group A	Wang Yi
Hip Hop	Time	Group A	Chen Sijian
Hip Hop	Time	Group A	Cui Shaopeng
Hip Hop	Time	Group A	Li You
Hip Hop	Time	Group A	Manny
Hip Hop	Time	Group A	Xu Longhan
Hip Hop	Time	Group B	Ye Ziming
Hip Hop	Time	Group B	Chen Sijian
Hip Hop	Time	Group B	Li You
Hip Hop	Time	Group B	Lin Yuzhi
Hip Hop	Time	Group B	Shao Haofan
Hip Hop	Time	Group B	Sun Zelin
Hip Hop	Time	Group B	Wu Zelin
Future pop	火种 (Tinder)	Group A	Lian Huaiwei
Future pop	火种 (Tinder)	Group A	Chen Tao
Future pop	火种 (Tinder)	Group A	Chen Youwei
Future pop	火种 (Tinder)	Group A	Deng Chaoyuan
Future pop	火种 (Tinder)	Group A	Hu Wenxuan
Future pop	火种 (Tinder)	Group A	Shi Zhan
Future pop	火种 (Tinder)	Group A	Wen Yechen
Future pop	火种 (Tinder)	Group B	Lin Mo
Future pop	火种 (Tinder)	Group B	Su Yuhang
Future pop	火种 (Tinder)	Group B	Jia Yi
Future pop	火种 (Tinder)	Group B	Qin Bohan
Future pop	火种 (Tinder)	Group B	Shi Zhan
Future pop	火种 (Tinder)	Group B	Wen Kaiwei
Future pop	火种 (Tinder)	Group B	Zhan Yu
Pop	迷宫 (Maze)	Group A	Guan Yue
Pop	迷宫 (Maze)	Group A	Anthony
Pop	迷宫 (Maze)	Group A	Chen Yunong
Pop	迷宫 (Maze)	Group A	Deng Bin
Pop	迷宫 (Maze)	Group A	Hu Jiahao
Pop	迷宫 (Maze)	Group A	Yin Shi
Pop	迷宫 (Maze)	Group B	Ye Helin
Pop	迷宫 (Maze)	Group B	Che Huixuan
Pop	迷宫 (Maze)	Group B	Ding Feijun
Pop	迷宫 (Maze)	Group B	Fu Hongyi
Pop	迷宫 (Maze)	Group B	Yao Bolan
Pop	迷宫 (Maze)	Group B	Yang Ning
Pop ballad	I'm Sorry	Group A	Xia Hanyu
Pop ballad	I'm Sorry	Group A	Zhou Shiyuan
Pop ballad	I'm Sorry	Group A	Li Zonglin
Pop ballad	I'm Sorry	Group A	Qi Zhihao
Pop ballad	I'm Sorry	Group A	Shen Qunfeng
Pop ballad	I'm Sorry	Group A	Wang Jiayi
Pop ballad	I'm Sorry	Group B	Feng Junjie
Pop ballad	I'm Sorry	Group B	Gu Landi
Pop ballad	I'm Sorry	Group B	Lin Zheyu
Pop ballad	I'm Sorry	Group B	Wang Xinyu
Pop ballad	I'm Sorry	Group B	Yao Chi
Pop ballad	I'm Sorry	Group B	Zhou Yuan

Lists of Concept Evaluation (Adjusted)
Type	Song	Group Name	Name	Number of Personal Votes	Number of Group Votes
Future trap pop	重塑 Rebuild	Re-Biuiuiuiuiu Biu	Yao Mingming	21	270
Future trap pop	重塑 Rebuild	Re-Biuiuiuiuiu Biu	Li Zhenning	24	270
Future trap pop	重塑 Rebuild	Re-Biuiuiuiuiu Biu	Shi Mingze	14	270
Future trap pop	重塑 Rebuild	Re-Biuiuiuiuiu Biu	Li Wenhan	129	270
Future trap pop	重塑 Rebuild	Re-Biuiuiuiuiu Biu	Bo Yuan	4	270
Future trap pop	重塑 Rebuild	Re-Biuiuiuiuiu Biu	Hu Chunyang	44	270
Future trap pop	重塑 Rebuild	Re-Biuiuiuiuiu Biu	He Changxi	34	270
Hip Hop	Time	Eight Treasure Congee	Lin Yuzhi	3	34
Hip Hop	Time	Eight Treasure Congee	Sun Zelin	5	34
Hip Hop	Time	Eight Treasure Congee	We Zelin	2	34
Hip Hop	Time	Eight Treasure Congee	Xu Fangzhou	5	34
Hip Hop	Time	Eight Treasure Congee	Xu Longhan	2	34
Hip Hop	Time	Eight Treasure Congee	Shao Haofan	5	34
Hip Hop	Time	Eight Treasure Congee	Wang Yi	3	34
Hip Hop	Time	Eight Treasure Congee	Chen Sijian	9	34
Future pop	火种 (Tinder)	Team Prosperous-dazed-hahahaha	Jia Yi	39	180
Future pop	火种 (Tinder)	Team Prosperous-dazed-hahahaha	Deng Chaoyuan	33	180
Future pop	火种 (Tinder)	Team Prosperous-dazed-hahahaha	Lin Mo	18	180
Future pop	火种 (Tinder)	Team Prosperous-dazed-hahahaha	Chen Youwei	32	180
Future pop	火种 (Tinder)	Team Prosperous-dazed-hahahaha	Lian Huaiwei	30	180
Future pop	火种 (Tinder)	Team Prosperous-dazed-hahahaha	Wen Yechen	6	180
Future pop	火种 (Tinder)	Team Prosperous-dazed-hahahaha	Zhan Yu	6	180
Future pop	火种 (Tinder)	Team Prosperous-dazed-hahahaha	Chen Tao	16	180
Pop	迷宫 (Maze)	Youth Kindergarten	Wang Zhe	15	158
Pop	迷宫 (Maze)	Youth Kindergarten	Shi Zhan	46	158
Pop	迷宫 (Maze)	Youth Kindergarten	Hu Wenxuan	21	158
Pop	迷宫 (Maze)	Youth Kindergarten	Ding Feijun	5	158
Pop	迷宫 (Maze)	Youth Kindergarten	Guan Yue	52	158
Pop	迷宫 (Maze)	Youth Kindergarten	Li Zonglin	6	158
Pop	迷宫 (Maze)	Youth Kindergarten	Wu Chengze	1	158
Pop	迷宫 (Maze)	Youth Kindergarten	Xu Bingchao	12	158
Pop ballad	I'm Sorry	I'm Sorry Why is it like this	Wang Jiayi	4	96
Pop ballad	I'm Sorry	I'm Sorry Why is it like this	Gu Landi	20	96
Pop ballad	I'm Sorry	I'm Sorry Why is it like this	Yao Chi	34	96
Pop ballad	I'm Sorry	I'm Sorry Why is it like this	Feng Junjie	3	96
Pop ballad	I'm Sorry	I'm Sorry Why is it like this	Shen Qunfeng	5	96
Pop ballad	I'm Sorry	I'm Sorry Why is it like this	Zhou Shiyuan	7	96
Pop ballad	I'm Sorry	I'm Sorry Why is it like this	Xia Hanyu	23	96

=== Mission 4: Mentor collaboration stage ===
Song	Mentor	Trainees
Give Me A Chance	Lay Zhang	Li Wenhan
Give Me A Chance	Lay Zhang	Yao Mingming
Give Me A Chance	Lay Zhang	Hu Wenxuan
Give Me A Chance	Lay Zhang	Lin Mo
Give Me A Chance	Lay Zhang	Wang Jiayi
Give Me A Chance	Lay Zhang	Xu Longhan
Give Me A Chance	Lay Zhang	Xu Fangzhou
王牌冤家 (Quarrelsome Lovers)	Li Ronghao	Shi Zhan
王牌冤家 (Quarrelsome Lovers)	Li Ronghao	He Changxi
王牌冤家 (Quarrelsome Lovers)	Li Ronghao	Xu Bingchao
王牌冤家 (Quarrelsome Lovers)	Li Ronghao	Ding Feijun
王牌冤家 (Quarrelsome Lovers)	Li Ronghao	Li Zonglin
王牌冤家 (Quarrelsome Lovers)	Li Ronghao	Shao Haofan
王牌冤家 (Quarrelsome Lovers)	Li Ronghao	Lin Yuzhi
怪美的 (Ugly Beauty)	Jolin Tsai	Jia Yi
怪美的 (Ugly Beauty)	Jolin Tsai	Guan Yue
怪美的 (Ugly Beauty)	Jolin Tsai	Lian Huaiwei
怪美的 (Ugly Beauty)	Jolin Tsai	Feng Junjie
怪美的 (Ugly Beauty)	Jolin Tsai	Sun Zelin
HIGHLIGHT	Xu Minghao	Li Zhenning
HIGHLIGHT	Xu Minghao	Shi Mingze
HIGHLIGHT	Xu Minghao	Wen Yechen
HIGHLIGHT	Xu Minghao	Chen Qunfeng
HIGHLIGHT	Xu Minghao	Wu Zelin
HIGHLIGHT	Xu Minghao	Zhan Yu
HIGHLIGHT	Xu Minghao	Bo Yuan
Debut	MC Jin	Chen Youwei
Debut	MC Jin	Hu Chunyang
Debut	MC Jin	Chen Sijian
Debut	MC Jin	Yao Chi
Debut	MC Jin	Wang Yi
Debut	MC Jin	Gu Landi
通过验证 (Ti Amo remix)	After Journey	Xia Hanyu
通过验证 (Ti Amo remix)	After Journey	Deng Chaoyuan
通过验证 (Ti Amo remix)	After Journey	Zhou Shiyuan
通过验证 (Ti Amo remix)	After Journey	Wang Zhe
通过验证 (Ti Amo remix)	After Journey	Wu Chengze
通过验证 (Ti Amo remix)	After Journey	Chen Tao

=== Mission 5: Debut evaluation ===
Color key

- Leader
- Center

Song	Position	Trainee
暖色	Lead Vocal	Xu Fangzhou
暖色	Subvocal 1	Guan Yue
暖色	Subvocal 2	Shao Haofan
暖色	Subvocal 3	Chen Tao
暖色	Subvocal 4	Jia Yi
暖色	Subvocal 5	Shi Zhan
暖色	Subvocal 6	Yao Chi
暖色	Subvocal 7	Wang Zhe
暖色	Subvocal 8	Li Zhenning
暖色	Rap 1	Deng Chaoyuan
暖色	Rap 2	Wu Chengze
The Last Day	Lead Vocal	Xia Hanyu
The Last Day	Subvocal 1	Li Wenhan
The Last Day	Subvocal 2	Zhou Shiyuan
The Last Day	Subvocal 3	Lian Huaiwei
The Last Day	Subvocal 4	Lin Mo
The Last Day	Subvocal 5	He Changxi
The Last Day	Subvocal 6	Chen Youwei
The Last Day	Subvocal 7	Chen Sijian
The Last Day	Subvocal 8	Feng Junjie
The Last Day	Rap 1	Yao Mingming
The Last Day	Rap 2	Hu Chunyang

== Related Non-Profit Programs ==
=== Millions of Forests in China ===
Youth With You with the "China Million Forest" Program, the People's Daily, and the China Foundation for Poverty Alleviation to create a series of the joint non-profit programs with the theme of "Youth with you and non-profit programs". The program includes the public welfare task as the assessment criteria of the trainee's grades, allowing the trainees to join the public welfare activities and encourage the whole society to join the non-profit program.

=== Hundreds of Beautiful Villages in China ===
Li Wenhan, Chen Youwei, Deng Chaoyuan, Wang Jiayi, Hu Chunyang, Wang Hao and other trainees come to the "MaMaHua's Hillside" as the representatives of the China Poverty Alleviation Foundation "Hundreds of Beautiful Villages in China" Non-Profit Program to experience life as a farmer in Hebei Nanxun.

=== The Child of Stars ===
Under the leading of the art director Huang Doudou, the trainees entered the world of autistic children, hoping to call the attention from the whole society and illuminate their lonely world with the help from the whole society. In the rehabilitation center, according to the child's preferences, the trainees gently step to the inner world of the lonely child. Zhou Shiyuan and Fu Hongyi used music therapy to have fun with children. Lin Mo and Shi Mingze also took photos to those children.

=== Respecting and Accompanying the Elderly ===
After releasing the theme of "Youth with you and non-profit programs" non-profit programs, the whole talent show use to the high requirements of the moral quality to restrict trainees. A large part of the talent show is related to the non-profit programs in order to encourage the audience to engage those programs with them. In this program, Wang Jieshi, a teacher from the art direction group, accompanied the trainees to the nursing home to give the old people the gift they needed most – companionship.
