= Magical Space-Time =

- Also known as: Finally you are here
- Traditional Chinese: 奇妙的时光之旅
- Simplified Chinese: 奇妙的时光之旅
- Hanyu Pinyin: Qí Miào De Shí Guāng Zhī Lǚ
- Genre: romance
- Written by: Wang Gungun; Hu Xiao Shuai
- Directed by: Fu-Hsiang Hsu
- Starring: Ruby Lin: Jia Nailiang; Xu Lu; Kim Sungjoo
- Country of origin: China
- Original language: Mandarin
- No. of episodes: 24

Production
- Executive producer: Zhang Huali
- Producers: He Jin; Gao Ming Qian
- Production locations: Beijing, China
- Running time: 45 minutes (per episode)

Original release
- Network: Hunan Broadcasting System
- Release: 27 April 2016

Magical Space-Time is a 2016 Chinese television series directed by Fu-Hsiang Hsu (許富翔). Filming for the series started on 20 January 2016 in Beijing and ended on 27 March 2016. It first aired in China on the Hunan Broadcasting System (HBS) on 27 April 2016.

== Plot ==
The story follows Han Ruofei (Jia Nailiang), who underwent plastic surgery and a change of name following an explosion of the yacht he was in. He managed to obtain a time-traveling polaroid which was a gift from his wife who was already dead. By taking a selfie, it allows him to travel back in time to the same place 10 years ago. However, the time-traveling machine has limitations too. He cannot travel as many times as he wants, the maximum time for each travel is 10 minutes, and he can only travel back to exactly the same place 10 years ago. Determined to save his deceased wife, Xie Jiaxin (Ruby Lin), an actress, and also uncover the cause of his mother's death, he sets off on his time-traveling journey.

There in the past, conflicts happen between Ruofei, his wife, and his past self, Peng Zhendong (Kim Sungjoo). At the same time, he meets an energetic girl named Song Qiaoqiao (Xu Lu), who is a huge fan of his wife. Various misunderstandings, collisions, and mischiefs occur between the two. Later, as the two gradually develop a deep understanding for each other, Song Qiaoqiao started to develop a feeling for him. Through the many times of time-traveling, he rewrites history and managed to bring his wife back to life in the present. He uncovers the real truth behind the death of his mother and the downhill of their family business.

== Cast ==
- Ruby Lin as Xie Jiaxin, ex-wife of Peng Zhendong, rising diva actress, She was supposed to be dead before Han Ruofei change the timeline from ten year ago which alter her fate.
- Jia Nailiang as Han Ruofei, Present day Peng Zhendong who underwent plastic surgery and a change of name following an explosion of the yacht ten year ago. Became a time traveler by using time-traveling polaroid which was a gift from his wife.
- Xu Lu as Song Qiaoqiao, Huge fan of Xie Jiaxin who Han Ruofei befriends.
- Kim Sung-joo as Peng Zhendong, Past self of Han Ruofei before plastic surgery ten years ago. He was presumed decreased/missing after the explosion of the yacht ten year ago
- Wang Yu as Du Kai, Manager of Xie Jiaxin and Han Ruofei's love rival.
- Wu Yang as Xu Qiao
- Li Qiang as Pan Zhiyong
- Hu Ling Meng as Lola
- Xiong Xiao Wen as Zheng Mei Ying

== Music ==
- Opening Theme : "Wǒ Yǐ Wéi" (我以为; I Love You So) sung by Alex Chou
- Ending theme : "Xìng Fú Tài Duǎn" (幸福太短; Fleeting Happiness) sung by A-Lin
- Theme Song : "Xiǎng Huí Dào Nà Yì Tiān" (想回到那一天; Back to the Day) sung by Eric Chou

== International broadcast ==
Network	Country	Airing Date	Timeslot
Hunan Television	China	April 27, 2016	Wed-Thr 22:00-24:00
Astro Shuang Xing	Malaysia	October 5, 2016	Mon-Fri 19:00-20:00pm
Videoland Channel	Taiwan	April 14, 2017	Mon-Fri 20:00-21:00pm
