= Liu Lingzi =

Chinese singer and actress (born 1998)

- 刘令姿
- Born: 6 April 1998 (age 28); Chengdu, Sichuan, China
- Education: Central Academy of Drama
- Occupations: Singer; actress
- Years active: 2020–present

Liu Lingzi (simplified Chinese: 刘令姿; traditional Chinese: 劉令姿; pinyin: Liú Lìngzī; born 6 April 1998), birth name Liu Yanhong (刘妍宏), is a Chinese singer and actress. A graduate of the musical theatre department of the Central Academy of Drama, she first became known in 2020 as a contestant on the iQIYI girl group reality competition Youth With You (season 2), where she finished in 14th place. She subsequently turned to acting, appearing in television dramas such as New Life Begins (2022) and Liuzhou ji (2024).

== Early life and education ==
Liu Lingzi was born on 6 April 1998 in Chengdu, Sichuan. She studied Chinese dance at the middle school affiliated with the Beijing Dance Academy, and later graduated from the musical theatre department of the Central Academy of Drama. Her interests include photography, skateboarding, and watching films and musicals; her favourite singer is Jay Chou.

== Career ==
In early 2020, Liu Lingzi took part as a trainee in the iQIYI girl group survival reality show Youth With You (season 2). During the competition she was promoted to grade A. At the finale on 30 May she ranked 14th and did not earn a place in the debuting group The9. In June that year she formed the one-day limited girl group 172Girls together with Curley G (Zeng Kani), Jin Zihan and Dai Yanni. In music, she released the single "Migratory Bird" (候鸟) with Curley G in 2020.

From 2022, Liu Lingzi shifted her focus to acting, making her television debut as Yuan Ying in New Life Begins. In the following years she appeared in web dramas including Liuzhou ji (2024), Baiyue Fanxing (2025) and Taohua Ying Jiangshan (2025).

== Filmography ==
Year	Title	Role	Notes
2022	New Life Begins (卿卿日常)	Yuan Ying	
2023	Yanshan pai yu Baihua men (燕山派与百花门)	Yue Qingqiu	
2024	Sihai Chongming (四海重明)	Woman in white	
2024	Liuzhou ji (柳舟记)	He Zhen	
2025	Baiyue Fanxing (白月梵星)	Luan Zhu	
2025	Taohua Ying Jiangshan (桃花映江山)	Meng Zhenzhen	
2026	Nanbu Dang'an (南部档案)	Fenghuang	
2026	Quegu (雀骨)	Ruisheng	
TBA	Mingyue lu (明月录)	Lu Ying	Unreleased
TBA	Feng bu qi (凤不栖)	Jiang Zhaowei	Unreleased
TBA	He bu tong zhou du (何不同舟渡)	Chang Yan	Unreleased
