= You Drive Me Crazy (TV series) =

2018 South Korean television series

- Promotional poster
- Hangul: 미치겠다, 너땜에!
- Lit.: I'm Crazy, Because of you!
- RR: Michigetda, neo ttaeme!
- MR: Mich'igetta, nŏ ttaeme!
- Genre: Romance; Melodrama
- Created by: Kang Dae-seon
- Written by: Park Mi-ryeong
- Directed by: Hyun Sol-ip
- Starring: Lee Yoo-young; Kim Seon-ho; Kim Sung-joo; Kwon Do-woon
- Country of origin: South Korea
- Original language: Korean
- No. of episodes: 4 (Note: In order to circumvent Korean laws that prevent commercial breaks in the middle of an episode, what would previously have been aired as single 70 minute episodes are now being repackaged as two 35 minute episodes, with two episodes being shown each night with a commercial break between the two.)

Production
- Camera setup: Single-camera
- Running time: 35 minutes
- Production company: MBC Drama Production

Original release
- Network: MBC TV
- Release: May 7 – May 8, 2018

You Drive Me Crazy (Korean: 미치겠다, 너땜에!) is a 2018 South Korean television series starring Lee Yoo-young, Kim Seon-ho, Kim Sung-joo and Kwon Do-woon. It was aired on MBC from May 7–8, 2018.

== Synopsis ==
Han Eun-sung and Kim Rae-wan have been friends for 8 years but their relationship changes after they sleep together. The mini series follows their shift in dynamics and revisitations to their past regrets and feelings (that were put aside in the name of friendship).

== Cast ==
=== Main ===
- Kim Seon-ho as Kim Rae-wan (27 years old)

An artist. He has been Eun-sung's best friend for 8 years.

- Lee Yoo-young as Han Eun-sung (27 years old)

A simultaneous translator of French.

=== Supporting ===
- Kim Sung-joo as Yoon Hee-nam (early 20s)

An indie blues artist.

- Kwon Do-woon as Moon Seo-jung (early 20s)

A part-timer at Rae-wan's favorite cafe.

- Ryu Hye-rin as Kang Ji-in (27 years old)

Eun-sung's friend. She is also a French interpreter.

- Park Hyo-joo as Lee Hyun-ji (early 30s)

Rae-wan's superior, she is the CEO of Hongdae Cafe.

- Ahn Ji-hoon
- Ok Joo-ri
- Lee Hwi-hyang

== Original soundtrack ==
You Drive Me Crazy (Original Television Soundtrack) Special

Soundtrack album by Various Artists
- Released: May 29, 2018
- Genre: Soundtrack
- Length: 53:08
- Languages: Korean; English
- Labels: MBC; Leeway Music & Media; Vlending

You Drive Me Crazy soundtrack album written by music director Joo Hong-chul contains two singles and 28 score pieces from the series. It features vocal performances from Sung Joo.

Single(s)
No.	Title	Artist	Length
1.	"Crazy" (미치겠다)	Sung Joo	2:53
2.	"Crazy (Instrumental)" (미치겠다)	Lee Sang-u, Suh Young-ho	2:53
Total length:			5:06

B Side Songs
No.	Title	Artist	Length
1.	"The day love began" (사랑이 시작하는 날)	Jo So-hye	1:52
2.	"Something coming" (다가온다)	Joo Hong-chul	1:31
3.	"A sweet smile" (신세 좀 질게)	Joo Hong-chul	2:18
4.	"Lovey dovey" (어색한 로맨스)	Jo So-hye	1:32
5.	"Childish prank" (투닥투닥)	Oh Hee-jun	3:13
6.	"Bokgo" (복고)	Joo Hong-chul	3:33
7.	"Delicate" (손길)	Joo Hong-chul	0:43
8.	"Palpitating" (두근두근)	Oh Hee-jun	2:18
9.	"Rae-wan's day" (래완의 하루)	Noh Hyung-woo	2:40
10.	"Daily life" (일상)	Joo Hong-chul	1:47
11.	"Mirror ball" (미러볼)	Oh Hee-jun	1:23
12.	"My pathetic life" (살구, 지구)	Joo Hong-chul	0:45
13.	"Confusing" (왔다 갔다)	Joo Hong-chul	0:54
14.	"The Apricot tree" (살구나무)	Noh Hyung-woo	1:03
15.	"The kiss under the apricot tree" (살구나무 아래에서)	Joo Hong-chul	1:26
16.	"Sulking" (토라짐)	Joo Hong-chul	1:50
17.	"Oh, my" (참..나)	Joo Hong-chul	3:07
18.	"An explosion of jealousy" (질투폭발)	Jo So-hye	1:31
19.	"Morning" (아침)	Joo Hong-chul	2:45
20.	"Her" (그녀)	Joo Hong-chul	1:51
21.	"Push and pull" (밀당)	Oh Hee-jun	1:11
22.	"Sauna" (목욕탕)	Oh Hee-jun	2:16
23.	"A bright day" (하루)	Joo Hong-chul	3:01
24.	"Friends or lovers" (애매한 우리 사이)	Joo Hong-chul	1:19
25.	"Time apart" (멀리 있던 시간들)	Oh Hee-jun	2:20
26.	"Love you" (좋아하는 걸로)	Noh Hyung-woo	4:10
27.	"Sincerely" (늦은 진심)	Oh Hee-jun	4:32
28.	"SNAP!" (레드썬)	Noh Hyung-woo	2:13
Total length:			58:39

== Production ==
On March 2, 2018, MBC announced that Lee Yoo-young and Kim Seon-ho confirmed as the lead roles in an MBC one-act play to be broadcast in May. Directed by Hyun Sol-ip, it was their first time as main leads on a terrestrial channel.

The first script reading of the cast was held in March 2018 at MBC Broadcasting Station in Sangam-dong.

== Viewership ==
In the table below, the blue numbers represent the lowest ratings and the red numbers represent the highest ratings.

Ep.	Broadcast date	Average audience share			
Ep.	Broadcast date	TNmS		AGB Nielsen	
Ep.	Broadcast date	Nationwide	Seoul	Nationwide	Seoul
1	May 7, 2018	2.4%	2.6%	2.5%	2.7%
2	May 7, 2018	2.1%	2.3%	2.2%	2.4%
3	May 8, 2018	2.3%	2.5%	2.4%	2.6%
4	May 8, 2018	2.2%	2.3%	2.4%	2.5%
Average		2.3%	2.4%	2.4%	2.6%
