= ALL'N =

South Korean and American K-pop singer

ALL'N 올린
- Born: Sam Sungmin Kang; Busan, South Korea
- Genre: K-pop
- Instrument: Violin
- Label: SKS Entertainment

Sam Sungmin Kang, known professionally as ALL'N (stylized in all-caps), is a South Korean and American K-pop singer, rapper, DJ, and violinist. He was previously a classically trained violinist and participated in idol training in China before making his debut as a solo artist in 2026 under his own label SKS Entertainment, of which he serves as CEO. He is set to release his first album, Four Seasons, in November 2026.

== Biography ==
He was born in Busan, South Korea, but grew up in the United States. He was classically trained as a violinist, and played violin competitively starting at age 9. He then went to NYU, where he studied music business on a full scholarship. When playing the violin, however, he felt limited, and inspired by a guitarist friend, he also taught himself guitar. This led him to become interested in K-pop and becoming a K-pop musician. Ultimately, he received an offer from an executive at a music company in China to join idol training, and decided to "drop everything" and take it; he noted that he "threw away 90% of [his] stuff" before flying out.

In China, after transferring to a different agency, he entered the show Youth With You, where he competed and rose to a high rank before ultimately being removed after previous controversial remarks resurfaced. He went on to shift into becoming a DJ, utilizing his violin skills as well: however, he made his debut as a DJ in Wuhan not long before the COVID-19 pandemic. He has stated that he "gave [him]self a deadline. If COVID didn't end by a certain date, then I decided to take that as a sign from God". As COVID had not ended by that date, he shifted into business, working at a startup.

After four years, however, he decided to return to music and realize a dream of his by founding his own entertainment company, SKS Entertainment. This led to him making his debut as a K-pop singer and violinist under his own label. As of November 2026, he has released three songs, "We Up", "Dream Higher", and "Ding". All of his songs heavily utilize the violin, and he has stated a goal of his is "to take the violin into genres beyond those listeners might naturally associate with it". However, he has also stated he has only a limited number of releases he can finance, and that if the company doesn't become financially stable by that time he would likely have to stop. He also produces his own songs, and has stated he seeks to be involved in every aspect of the creation of his songs.

He was named K-Pop's Up and Comer of the Month in August 2026 by Billboard. He took his stage name ALL'N from a combination of "all in" and "violin". He has noted that it is difficult to produce a good sound on the violin while dancing but that he has practiced to make it sound good and look natural during live performances.

After releasing his first song, "We Up", in April 2026, he performed four days in a row; his "charismatic gestures" and "relaxed stage presence" were noted by The Chosun Ilbo. He broke his nose while doing a backflip filming the music video of his second song, "Dream Higher". His third song, "Ding", was inspired by a meeting All'n had with Tomorrow X Together in the elevator: his recounting of the meeting went viral. The song incorporates the elevator's ding, and includes elements of dubstep and rap. He has announced he will release his first album, Four Seasons, on November 23, 2026.

== Discography ==
=== Albums ===
Title	Release Date
Four Seasons	November 23, 2026

=== Singles ===
Title	Release Date
"Ding"	October 2, 2026
"Dream Higher"	August 14, 2026
"We Up"	April 15, 2026
