= Zhou Yixuan =

Chinese rapper, singer and actor (born 1990)

- 周艺轩
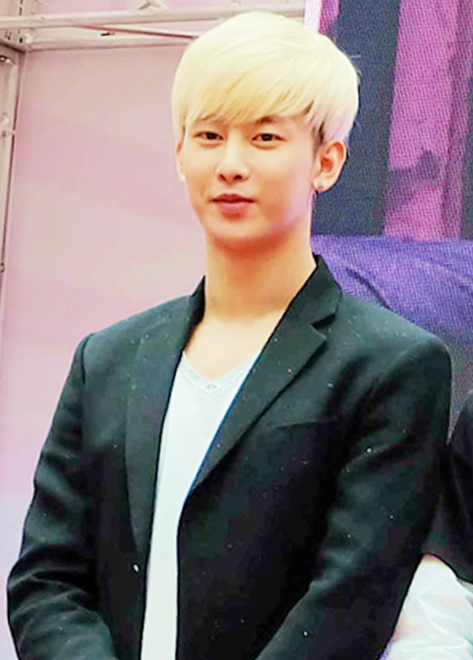
- Zhou in 2015
- Born: December 11, 1990 (age 35); Shengzhou, Zhejiang, China
- Occupations: Rapper; singer; actor
- Musical career
- Genres: C-pop; K-pop
- Instrument: Vocals
- Years active: 2014–present
- Label: Yuehua
- Member of: Uniq; New Storm

Zhou Yixuan
- Traditional Chinese: 周藝軒
- Simplified Chinese: 周艺轩
Transcriptions
Standard Mandarin
- Hanyu Pinyin: Zhōu Yìxuān

Zhou Yixuan (simplified Chinese: 周艺轩; traditional Chinese: 周藝軒; pinyin: Zhōu Yìxuān; born December 11, 1990) is a Chinese rapper, singer and actor. He is a member and leader of Chinese-South Korean group Uniq under Yuehua Entertainment and Chinese group New Storm which debuted in 2019 after winning the survival show All for One.

== Early life ==
Zhou Yixuan was born in Shengzhou, Zhejiang, China in the town of Chengguan on December 11, 1990. He attended Shengzhou No.2 Middle School and went on to attend Beijing Contemporary Music Academy and was scouted by Yuehua Entertainment at a dance competition.

== Career ==
=== 2014–2015: Debut with Uniq ===
On September 24, 2014, Zhou was introduced as the 5th member of Uniq. The group officially debuted on October 16, 2014, with their single, Falling in Love. Zhou co-wrote the Chinese version of the song. In 2015, Zhou co-wrote the Chinese versions of three songs for Uniq's first EP, EOEO优+ which includes "EOEO", "Luv Again", and "Listen to Me".

=== 2016–present: Acting career and solo activities ===
Zhou made cameo appearances in the 2016 films MBA Partners and Jeffrey Lau's A Chinese Odyssey Part Three and officially made his acting debut in the web drama Female President in May 2016.

Zhou filmed the drama Time City, starring Korean actress Park Min-young. He landed his first lead role in Marna starring alongside his labelmates, Cosmic Girls' Xuanyi and Meiqi, and Produce 101/Idol Producer contestant Zhu Zhengting. Soon after, Zhou was cast in Step Up: Year of the Dance, a spin-off of the Step Up franchise. The dances in the movie were choreographed by Willdabeast Adams and Janelle Ginestra. He then filmed The Origin of Love, a web drama based on the popular web novel, Desolate Era by I Eat Tomatoes.

In May 2017, Zhou participated in The Rap of China, a rap competition. He passed four rounds and was eliminated during Team Selection.

In August 2017, Zhou judged the top 20 singers of a singing competition held by the live broadcasting app Inke. The winner of the competition had the opportunity to sing the Mr. Inke theme song with Zhou. The song of the same name was released in October.

In September 2017, Zhou starred in the all-star filled comedy, To B or Not to B, playing various roles.

Zhou released singles Do Back on November 23 and GIRL GIRL GIRL on December 4 ahead of his first solo EP release. The EP titled OS was released on December 27 which included a third single, Want a Trip. The music video for GIRL GIRL GIRL was released on March 30 the following year.

Zhou was awarded the Emerging Fashion Figure award at the 2017 Asian Influence Awards Ceremony. He was also awarded the Emerging Honorary Certificate at The 2017 Belt and Road Fashion Culture Industry Forum. Zhou was awarded the 2018 Most Anticipated Star Traveler at the 2017 Sina Travel Annual Awards.

Zhou became a cast member for The Chamber of Secrets Escape, a new task based variety show on Hunan TV which premiered in April 2018. Zhou wrote the lyrics for Uniq's new single titled "不曾离开过" which was released in April 2018.

In May 2018, Zhou had a cameo role in fellow band member Wenhan's drama, Basketball Fever. In September 2018, his movie Water Bro was released in which he played the lead role, Xia Bing and starring alongside Thai actor New Thitipoom.

Zhou took part in the Chinese survival show, All for One with fellow Yuehua trainees and won in the finals, gaining the very first place. His group, New Storm, debuted in 2019 with "Get High".

== Discography ==
=== Extended plays ===
Title	Album details
OS	Release: December 27, 2017; Label: Yuehua Entertainment; Format: digital download; track list: 1. "Do Back"; 2. "GIRL GIRL GIRL"; 3. "Want a Trip"

=== Singles ===
Year	title	Album	Notes	Ref.
2019	"有我在"			

=== Promotional singles ===
Title	Year	Note
"Mr. Inke" (with Semon)	2017	Mr. Inke theme song
"XS 有型有YOUNG"	2017	XS energy drink

=== Production credits ===
Year	Album	Song	Lyrics		Music
Year	Album	Song	Credited	With	Credited
2014	EOEO优+	Falling in Love (Chinese version)	Yes	Matthew Heath, GG Riggs, Wang Ya Jun	—N/a
2015	EOEO优+	EOEO (Chinese version)	Yes	Wenhan, Deanfluenza	—
2015	EOEO优+	Listen to Me (Chinese version)	Yes	Atozzio, Jarah Lafayette Gibson, Wang Ya Jun	—
2015	EOEO优+	Luv Again (Chinese version)	Yes	Wenhan, Francis Sooho Kim, DJ Nure	—
2015	Non-album single	One More Love	Yes	Jeffrey Kong	—
2015	Non-album single	Best Friend (Chinese version)	Yes	Wenhan	—
2015	The SpongeBob Movie: Sponge Out of Water OST	Erase Your Little Sadness	Yes	Seungyoun, Xiao Ke	—
2016	MBA Partners OST	My Dream	Yes	Jeon Changyeop, Chun Joonkyu	—
2017	Non-album single	Happy New Year 2017	Yes	—	—
2017	Non-album single	Mr. Inke (with Semon)	Yes	Pan Geyang, Lin Yuncheng, Li San	—
2017	Non-album single	XS 有型有YOUNG	Yes	—	Yes
2017	OS	Do Back	Yes	—	Yes
2017	OS	GIRL GIRL GIRL	Yes	—	Yes
2017	OS	Want a Trip	Yes	—	Yes
2018	Non-album single	不曾离开过	Yes	—	—

== Filmography ==
=== Film ===
Year	Title		Role		Notes
Year	English	Chinese	English	Chinese	Notes
2016	MBA Partners	梦想合伙人	Wang Meimei Courier		Cameo
2016	A Chinese Odyssey Part 3	大话西游3	Sha Sheng	沙僧	Cameo
2018	Water Bro	脱泳而出	Xia Bing	夏冰	Lead
2018	Marna	初恋的滋味	Qin Xiao	秦骁	Lead
2019	Step Up: Year of the Dance	舞所不能	Big Bird	大鸟	Support

=== Television series ===
Year	Title		Role		Notes
Year	English	Chinese	English	Chinese	Notes
2016	Female President	女总裁的贴身高手	Leng Feng	冷锋	support
2016–2017	Female President 2	女总裁的贴身高手2	Leng Feng	冷锋	support
2017	To B or Not to B	男人装不装	—	—	various
2018	Basketball Fever	热血狂篮	Qiao Zijun	乔子俊	cameo
2019	Boys to Men	拜托啦师兄	Luan Xiaofei	栾小飞	support
2019	My Girlfriend	我不能恋爱的女朋友	Zheng Yi	TBA	support
TBA	Time City	时光之城	Chen Qinyan	沈钦言	support
TBA	The Origin of Love	莽荒纪之川落雪	Hu Tou	虎头	support

=== Television shows ===
Year	Title	Original title	Role
2018	The Chamber of Secrets Escape	暗夜古宅 · 密室逃脱	Fixed cast
2019	All for One	以团之名	Contestant

== Awards ==
Year	Award	Category	Result	Ref.
2017	Asian Influence Awards Ceremony	Emerging Fashion Figure	Won	
2017	The Belt and Road Fashion Culture Industry Forum	Emerging Honorary Certificate	Won	
2018	Sina Travel Annual Awards	Most Anticipated Star Traveler	Won	

=== Music program awards ===
==== Global Chinese Music ====
Global Chinese Music is a Chinese music program.

Year	Date	Song
2017	December 23	"GIRL GIRL GIRL"
