= Uniq (band) =

South Korean–Chinese boy group

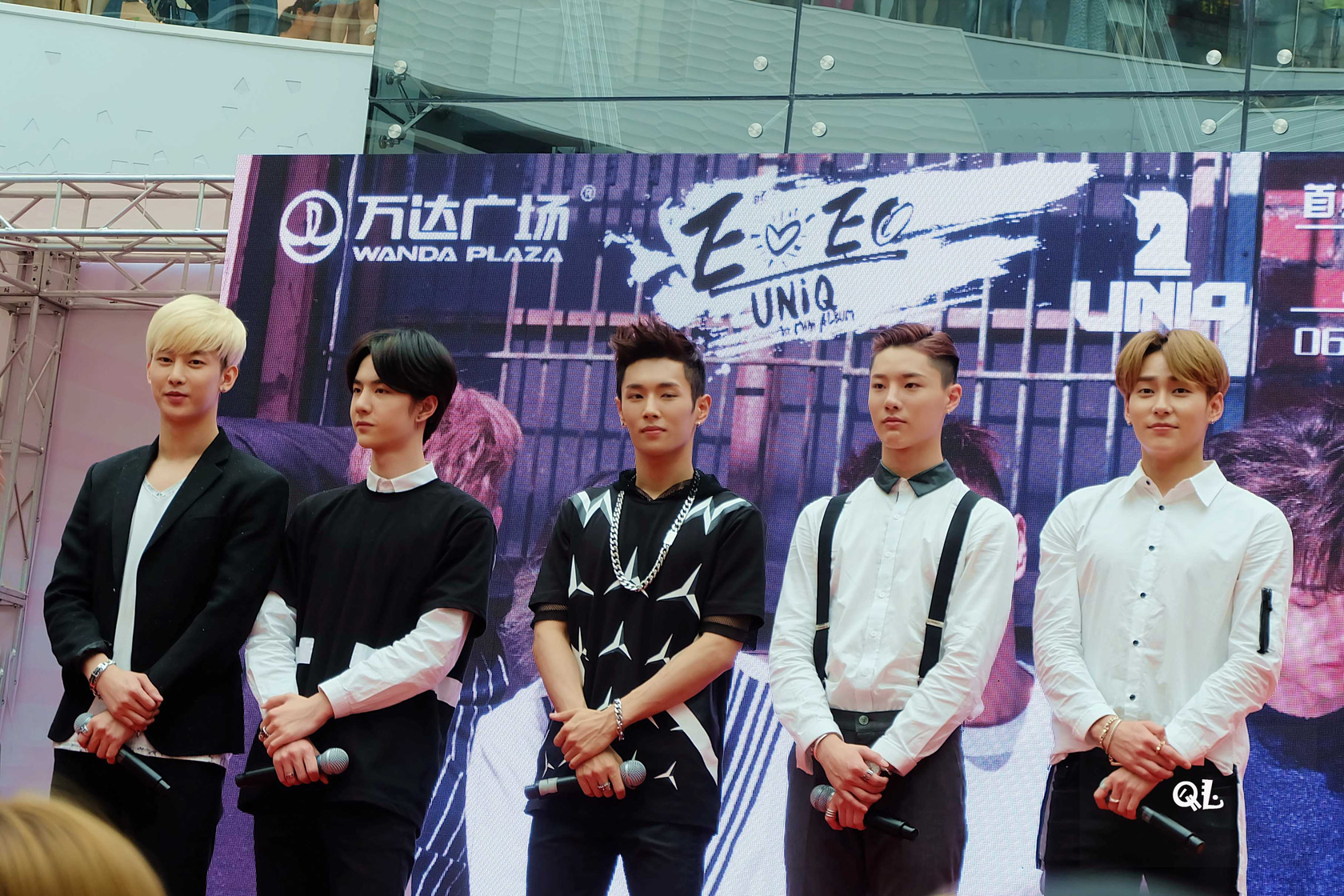
- Uniq in Shanghai during a fansign event, June 2015; From left to right: Zhou Yixuan, Wang Yibo, Li Wenhan, Cho Seung-youn, and Kim Sung-joo

Background information
- Origin: Seoul, South Korea
- Genres: K-pop; mandopop; dance
- Years active: 2014–2018 (Note: Indefinite hiatus)
- Label: Yuehua
- Members: Zhou Yixuan; Kim Sung-joo; Li Wenhan; Cho Seung-youn; Wang Yibo

Uniq (Korean: 유니크; stylized in all caps) was a South Korean–Chinese boy band formed by Chinese company Yuehua Entertainment in 2014. The group consists of five members: Zhou Yixuan, Kim Sung-joo, Li Wenhan, Cho Seung-youn, and Wang Yibo. Uniq officially debuted on October 20, 2014, with their debut single "Falling In Love" in both China and South Korea.

== History ==
=== Pre-debut ===
Uniq was initially planned as a YG Entertainment boy group, with the five members spending between two and five years at YG as trainees. Uniq was to be a collaborative effort with the Chinese company Yuehua Entertainment. Ultimately, the group debuted solely under Yuehua.

=== 2014: Debut with Falling in Love ===
On October 16, 2014, Uniq had their first broadcast performance in South Korea, on M Countdown. Their debut single, "Falling In Love", was released on October 20 in both China and South Korea. The group released the English adaptation of "Falling in Love" on November 5. Uniq had their first Chinese event, their fanmeet in Beijing on November 25. On November 27, Uniq began promotions in Taiwan and held a press conference on December 1. Uniq's three episode reality show The Best Debut began airing on December 2 on the Chinese online video platform, iQiyi.

Early in their debut, Uniq was chosen to participate in the OST for the movies TMNT and Penguins of Madagascar. On October 23, they released the song "Born to Fight" for the Chinese release of TMNT. On November 10, they released "Celebrate" for the Chinese release of Penguins of Madagascar.

=== 2015: EOEO and Japanese Debut ===
In January 2015, Uniq became endorsers for Xtep, a Chinese athletic brand. In February 2015, Uniq began promoting a Chinese beauty shop, Mix-Box, replacing Ko Chen-tung as the official endorser.

Uniq held their first fanmeet in Thailand in Bangkok on March 7.

In April, Yuehua Entertainment announced Uniq's comeback with their first mini album titled "EOEO". On April 22 they held their first comeback broadcast performance on MBC's Show Champion, performing their title track "EOEO" and "Listen to Me". On April 23, Uniq made their official comeback in China, performing "Listen to Me" at the KU Music Asian Music Awards. They were also awarded with KU Music Asian Music Awards' "Best New Artist" the same day. On April 24, Uniq released their mini album and the official music video for "EOEO". After the release of "EOEO", the music video reached number 3 on the YinYueTai Weekly MV Chart.

On May 22, Uniq released the official music video for their follow up track "Luv Again". Uniq achieved their first music show award on CCTV's Global Chinese Music chart on May 23. Uniq broke the record for most wins on Global Chinese Music Chart with three wins by non-live voting and three wins by live voting, beating the record previously held by EXO-M in 2014.

Uniq held their first showcases in Japan on July 19 and July 20 in Osaka and Tokyo respectively marking their debut in Japan.

In December, Uniq began to endorse Dr. Bear, a Chinese candy brand.

To commemorate their one-year since debut, Uniq released their second digital album, "Best Friend", on October 16. Uniq announced their 1st Anniversary Tour to be held in Beijing, Shanghai, and Japan. Uniq returned to Japan in November holding fanmeets across the country in Nagoya, Osaka, Fukuoka before ending the Japan tour in Tokyo. At this time, they released a special Japanese single album, "Best Friend," which includes the Japanese, Korean and Instrumental versions of "Best Friend." UNIQ concluded the tour in Beijing on November 28. The Shanghai stop was postponed, however a new date was never announced.

On December 7, Uniq released "Erase Your Little Sadness." On December 28, Uniq released "Happy New Year", with labelmate, Cosmic Girls, making a guest appearance in the music video. The song debuted at #4 position in China V Chart.

=== 2016: China and Japan Promotion ===
Uniq began Inke endorsements in February 2016, a Chinese live-streaming app. In March 24, the group released the song "My Dream" for the soundtrack of the movie MBA Partners, debuting at #3 position in China V Chart. Yixuan, Wenhan and Sungjoo went on a two-week-long roadshow in 14 cities to promote the movie.

On June 25, Uniq held their first fanmeet in São Paulo, Brazil.

Uniq released a Japanese single album in December 2016, "Falling in Love". Japanese versions of "Falling in Love" and "Listen to Me" are included in the single. Uniq held a Live Meet and Greet in Japan on December 10, and a fan signing and photo event on December 11.

=== 2017–present ===
On January 19, 2017, the group released the single "Happy New Year 2017". The song was written by Zhou Yixuan and brings the freshness of the year that begins. Yibo was unable to participate in the music video and the recording of the song due to scheduling conflicts. In the MV, Yixuan, Sungjoo, Wenhan, and Seungyoun assembled a snowman that represents Yibo.

Uniq had two singles "Never Left" and "Next Mistake" released on April 19, 2018.

The group has been on indefinite hiatus since 2018, although they have not officially disbanded, while the members have pursued independent projects. Yibo has pursued acting projects, while Wenhan debuted in the group UNINE, Yixuan debuted in the group New Storm and Seungyoun in X1. Sungjoo enlisted for his military service.

On October 16, 2020, for their 6th anniversary of debuting, Yixuan released the song "Remember That Day When We" dedicated to the Uniq members and the fans.

== Members ==
- Zhou Yixuan (simplified Chinese: 周艺轩; traditional Chinese: 周藝軒)
- Kim Sung-joo (Korean: 김성주)
- Li Wenhan (Chinese: 李汶翰)
- Cho Seung-youn (Korean: 조승연)
- Wang Yibo (Chinese: 王一博)

== Discography ==
=== Extended plays ===
Title	EP details	Peak chart positions	Sales
Title	EP details	KOR	Sales
EOEO	Release: April 28, 2015; Label: Yuehua Entertainment; Format: CD, digital download; Track listing: 1. "EOEO"; 2. "Luv Again"; 3. "Listen to Me"; 4. "Falling in Love"; 5. "Born to Fight"	7	KOR: 7,811+

=== Singles ===
Title	Year	Peak chart positions				Album
Title	Year	CHN Baidu	CHN Bill.	KOR Gaon	US World	Album
"Falling in Love"	2014	—	—	294	—	EOEO
"EOEO"	2015	—	—	—	16	EOEO
"Luv Again"	2015	—	—	—	—	EOEO
"Best Friend"	2015	—	24	—	—	Non-album singles
"Happy New Year"	2015	8	4	—	—	Non-album singles
"Falling in Love" (Japanese ver.)	2016	—	—	—	—	Non-album singles
"Happy New Year 2017"	2017	—	—	—	—	Non-album singles
"Never Left"	2018	—	—	—	—	Non-album singles
"Next Mistake"	2018	—	—	—	—	Non-album singles
"Monster"	2018	—	—	—	—	Non-album singles
"—" denotes releases that did not chart or were not released in that region.

=== Soundtracks ===
Title	Year	Peak chart positions	Album
Title	Year	CHN Bill.	Album
"Born to Fight"	2014	—	Teenage Mutant Ninja Turtles OST: Released: October 23, 2014
"Celebrate"	2014	—	Penguins of Madagascar OST: Released: November 10, 2014
"Erase Your Little Sadness"	2015	12	The SpongeBob Movie: Sponge Out of Water OST: Released: December 7, 2015
"My Dream"	2016	3	MBA Partners OST: Released: March 24, 2016
"告白情歌"	2017	—	Once Again OST: Released: August 7, 2017
"My Special"	2018		One and Another Him OST: Released: August 3, 2018
"—" denotes releases that did not chart or were not released in that region.

=== Other charted songs ===
Title	Year	Peak chart positions	Album
Title	Year	CHN Bill.	Album
"Happy New Year (UNIQ version)"	2015	22	Non-album single

=== Production credits ===
Year	Album	Song	Lyrics by	With
2014	Falling in Love	"Falling in Love" (Chinese version)	Yixuan	Jordan Kyle, Matthew Heath, GG Riggs, Wang Ya Jun
2014	Falling in Love	"Falling in Love" (Korean version)	Sungjoo	Jordan Kyle, Matthew Heath, GG Riggs
2014	Falling in Love	"Falling in Love" (Korean version)	Seungyoun	Jordan Kyle, Matthew Heath, GG Riggs
2015	EOEO	"EOEO" (Chinese version)	Yixuan	Deanfluenza
2015	EOEO	"EOEO" (Chinese version)	Wenhan	Deanfluenza
2015	EOEO	"EOEO" (Korean version)	Seungyoun	Deanfluenza
2015	EOEO	"Luv Again" (Chinese version)	Yixuan	Francis Sooho Kim, DJ Nure
2015	EOEO	"Luv Again" (Chinese version)	Wenhan	Francis Sooho Kim, DJ Nure
2015	EOEO	"Luv Again" (Korean version)	Seungyoun	Francis Sooho Kim, DJ Nure
2015	EOEO	"Listen to Me" (Chinese version)	Yixuan	Jordan Kyle, Atozzio, Jarah Lafayette Gibson, Wang Ya Jun
2015	EOEO	"Listen to Me" (Korean version)	Seungyoun	Jordan Kyle, Atozzio, Jarah Lafayette Gibson
2015	Best Friend	"Best Friend" (Chinese version)	Yixuan	—N/a
2015	Best Friend	"Best Friend" (Chinese version)	Wenhan	—N/a
2015	Best Friend	"Best Friend" (Korean version)	Sungjoo	—N/a
2015	Best Friend	"Best Friend" (Korean version)	Seungyoun	—N/a
2015	微公益	"One More Love" (益起爱)	Yixuan	Jeffrey Kong
2015	The SpongeBob Movie: Sponge Out of Water OST	"Erase Your Little Sadness"	Yixuan	Xiao Ke
2015	The SpongeBob Movie: Sponge Out of Water OST	"Erase Your Little Sadness"	Seungyoun	Xiao Ke
2016	MBA Partners OST	"My Dream"	Yixuan	Jeon Changyeop, Chun Joonkyu
2017	Happy New Year 2017	"Happy New Year 2017"	Yixuan	—N/a

=== Music videos ===
Year	Music video	Language ver.
2014	"Falling in Love"	Chinese, Korean, English, Japanese
2014	"Born To Fight"	
2014	"Celebrate"	
2015	"EOEO"	Chinese, Korean
2015	"Luv Again"	Chinese, Korean
2015	"Best Friend"	Chinese, Korean
2015	"Erase Your Little Sad"	
2015	"Happy New Year"	
2015	"Happy New Year" (UNIQ version)	
2016	"My Dream"	
2017	"Happy New Year 2017"	

== Awards and nominations ==
Year	Award	Category	Nominated work	Result
2014	2015 iQiyi Awards	Most Anticipated Award	Uniq	Won
2015	Apollo Music Awards	Best Movie Soundtrack	"Born to Fight"	Won
2015	International K-Music Awards 2015	Best Choreography	"E.O.E.O"	Won
2015	Asia Billboard Awards	Popular Group Award	Uniq	Won
2015	Tencent Beijing App Awards	Most Promising Group of the Year (Asia)	Uniq	Won
2015	KU Music Asian Music Awards	Best New Artist	Uniq	Won
2015	MTV Europe Music Awards	Best Artist in Mainland China & Hong Kong	Uniq	Nominated
2015	2016 iQiyi Awards	Award	Uniq	Won
