= MBA Partners =

- Film poster
- Traditional Chinese: 夢想合夥人
- Simplified Chinese: 梦想合伙人
- Directed by: Jang Tae-yoo
- Screenplay by: Yang Fengxiang; Yoo Yeong-ah; Chen Shu
- Produced by: Du Hua; Wang Kafei; Ma Jun
- Starring: Yao Chen; Tiffany Tang; Hao Lei; Li Chen; Wang Yibo; Aaron Kwok
- Cinematography: Lu Douwan
- Music by: Uniq
- Distributed by: Heng Ye Film Distribution; Tianjin Maoyan Media; Beijing Weiying Shidai Technology; Beijing Lehua Yuanyu Media; Shanghai Huahua Media; Beijing Better World Culture Communication
- Release date: 29 April 2016
- Running time: 101 minutes
- Country: China
- Language: Mandarin
- Box office: CN¥81 million

MBA Partners is a 2016 Chinese romantic drama film directed by Jang Tae-yoo and starring Yao Chen, Tiffany Tang, Hao Lei, Li Chen and a special appearance by Aaron Kwok. It was released in China on 29 April 2016.

== Synopsis ==
Lu Zhenxi (Yao Chen) had a dream since her childhood, to become just like her uncle, a successful entrepreneur. But when her "Big American Dream" comes down crashing, she is left dejected, and returns to China. Now, after a fateful meeting with her idol Professor Meng (Aaron Kwok), she must find it in herself to take a second shot.

== Cast ==
- Yao Chen as Lu Zhenxi
- Tiffany Tang as Gu Qiaoyin
- Hao Lei as Wen Qing
- Li Chen as Niu Juncheng
- Wang Yibo as Zhao Shuyu
- Aaron Kwok as Professor Meng Xiaojun (special appearance)
- Lam Suet as Zhenxi's uncle (guest star)
- Wong He as Peng Daihai (guest star)
- Kent Tong as Mr. Zhou (guest star)
- Gallen Lo as Zou Zhixun (guest star)
- Kim Sung-joo as Lucas
- Jack Kao as Zhenxi's father
- Zheng Luoqian as An Qi
- Yu Xiaohui as Mrs. Wang
- Zhang Hui as Gang leader
- Li Shuangquan as Gang member
- Ni Qiaozhi as Tai Chi granddad
- Zhao Lei as Wen Qing's driver
- Han Jing as Bar drunken man
- Yan Yuehuang as Xie Jiaqi
- Man Lan as Jiaqi's mother
- Zhu Bilong as Relative A
- Zhou Wenfang as Relative B
- Chen Wenying as Relative C
- Zhu Xiaojuan as Xiao Fang
- Li Yao as Cheng Dongqing
- Zhu Jiali as Four-year-old middle sister
- Shi Caimei as Six-year-old elder sister
- Pan Jingzhi as Teenage middle sister
- Xiang Yufei as Teenage elder sister
- Zhang Yao as Adult middle sister
- Xu Jing as Adult elder sister
- Zhang Yue as Secretary Zhou
- Wang Fang as Ms. Wang
- Dai Chunxiao as Wen Qing's secretary
- Chen Jun as A team student
- Mu Haoxiang as B team student
- Hao Jie as C team student
- Han Li as Qiaoyin's mother
- Maria Cordero as Angel
- Ye Chao as Driver Lu
- Chen Ying as Fat Woman
- Yang Xiaoyun as High heels girl
- Tian Bin as Physical education teacher
- Zhu Liqun as Lu's mother
- Xu Yuan as Lu Zhenxi (childhood)
- Guan Feiyang as Niu Juncheng (childhood)
- Shi Yulei as Simultaneous translator A
- Yan Wenxin as Simultaneous translator B
- Duen Fan-kit as Reporter A
- Yan Yichen as Reporter B
- Wang Litengzi as Wen Qing's daughter
- Zach Martiross as DK CEO
- Michaal J. Riosential as DK employee A
- Aiden Yeary McDonald as DK employee B
- Michelle Smith as Anchorwoman
- Irina Bulavina as Female director
- Valentina Yakovleva as Reebcca
- Li Wenhan as MeiMei Wang courier
- Zhou Yixuan as MeiMei Wang courier
- Cho Seung-youn as MeiMei Wang courier

== Reception ==
The film grossed CN¥80.978 million at the Chinese box office.
