= Jiang Dawei =

- Born: January 22, 1947 (age 79); Tianjin, Republic of China
- Education: Yaohua School
- Occupation: Singer
- Years active: 1980–present
- Spouse: Zhang Peijun
- Children: Jiang Yi

Chinese name
- Traditional Chinese: 蔣大為
- Simplified Chinese: 蒋大为
Transcriptions
Standard Mandarin
- Hanyu Pinyin: Jiǎng Dàweí
- Musical career
- Genres: Ethnic music
- Label: Yinhua Entertainment Culture

Jiang Dawei (born January 22, 1947) is a Chinese folk singer, best known for a number of hit songs such as the theme song for the 1986 TV series Journey to the West. In 1968, he joined the Forest Trooper Art Troupe and began his singing career. In 1975, he joined the Beijing Central National Song and Dance Ensemble as a solo singer. He later became chairman of Central National Song and Dance Troupe, and the chairman of China Light Music Troupe.

Jiang Dawei has held concerts in the United States, Canada, Japan, Germany, Singapore, and Thailand.

== Personal life ==
Jiang married Zhang Peijun (张佩君), who is a former solo singer in the Central Ensemble of National Minorities Songs and Dances. They have a daughter, Jiang Yi (蒋怡; born 1978), and she holds Canadian citizenship.
