= Unine (band) =

Chinese boy band

UNINE
- Origin: China
- Years active: 2019–2020
- Label: iQiyi
- Past members: Li Wenhan; Li Zhenning; Yao Mingming; Guan Yue; Jiayi; Hu Chunyang; Xia Hanyu; Chen Youwei; He Changxi

Unine (stylized in all-caps) was a nine-member Chinese boy group active from April 2019 to October 2020. The group was formed through Youth with You season 1. The group consisted of Li Wenhan, Li Zhenning, Yao Mingming, Guan Yue, Jia Yi, Hu Chunyang, Xia Hanyu, Chen Youwei, and He Changxi.

== History ==
Unine was formed through the reality survival television show Youth With You, which aired from January 21 to April 6, 2019. It was the second edition of Idol Producer. Out of the 100 trainees, only nine would through audience votings. In the final episode the debut lineup was announced, in which Li Wenhan had come in first place, followed by Li Zhenning, Yao Mingming, Guan Yue, Jia Yi, Hu Chunyang, Xia Hanyu, Chen Youwei and He Changxi respectively.

Unine released their album U-Night Flight of 11 songs on May 6, 2020, and, before their disbandment, the EP Unforgettable on September 30, 2020. The group officially disbanded on October 6, 2020.

== Members ==
- Li Wenhan (李汶翰)
- Li Zhenning (李振宁)
- Yao Mingming (姚明明)
- Guan Yue (管栎)
- Jia Yi (嘉羿)
- Hu Chunyang (胡春杨)
- Xia Hanyu (夏瀚宇)
- Chen Youwei (陈宥维)
- He Changxi (何昶希)

== Endorsements ==
On April 6, after their debut, PD Lay Zhang and guest host He Jiong announced the group's logo and that Unine would be the ambassador of 蒙牛真果粒. The group was also announced as endorsers of Saselomo and Haitaijia in 2019.

== Discography ==
=== Studio albums ===
Title	Release date	Track listing	Sales
U-Night Flight	May 6, 2020	1. "Ready Go"; 2. "Bad Bad Bad"; 3. "Future World"; 4. "Precious"; 5. "Over"; 6. "Controller"; 7. "I Know" (我明白); 8. "Arrival"; 9. "Superpower"; 10. "Now"; 11. "U're Mine"	China: 138,020

=== Extended plays ===
Title	Release date	Track listing	Sales
Unlock	May 6, 2019	1. Bomba; 2. "Like A Gentleman"; 3. "Spring Day Memories" (春日记忆)	China: 777,293
Unusual	October 21, 2019	1. "Rent a Bus to the Moon" (租辆大巴去月亮); 2. "Set It Off"; 3. "Butterfly" (海水不下坠	China: 1,251,121
Unforgettable	September 30, 2020	1. "I Made It"; 2. "Silent Word" (無言絮語); 3. "Shining Days" (閃亮的日子)	China: 82,075

=== Singles ===
Title	Year	Album
"Bomba"	2019	Unlock
"Set It Off"	2019	Unusual
"Rock Me"	2020	Non-album singles
"Ready Go"	2020	U-Night Flight
"U're Mine"	2020	U-Night Flight
"I Made It"	2020	Unforgettable

== Filmography ==
=== Television shows ===
Year	Title	Network	Notes
2019	Youth with You season 1	iQiyi	Contestants
2019	Unine Bomba (Unine蹦吧)	iQiyi	Variety show
2019	Supernova Games season 2 (超新星全运会第二季)	Tencent	—N/a
2019	Unine Vlog (Vlog 营业中)	iQiyi	Vlog
2020	Unine Vlog 2 (Vlog 营业中 2)	iQiyi	Vlog
2020	Supernova Games season 3 (超新星全运会第三季)	Tencent	—N/a
