= Youth With You =

Chinese television series

Youth With You (Chinese: 青春有你), also known by its Chinese title Qīng Chūn Yǒu Nǐ or simply QCYN, is a Chinese reality television talent competition franchise that premiered on the iQIYI video platform. Called Idol Producer Season 2 before filming, it is the second edition of the 2018 Chinese reality boy group survival show Idol Producer.

== Production ==
It is produced by iQIYI and Beijing Caviar Communications, the same company behind the previous show. Little Monster Studios joined as a co-producing company in the second season.

== Seasons ==
- Youth With You season 1, 2019
- Youth With You season 2, 2020
- Youth With You season 3, 2021
- Starlight Boys, 2024
