= Li Wenhan =

Chinese singer (born 1994)

- 李汶翰
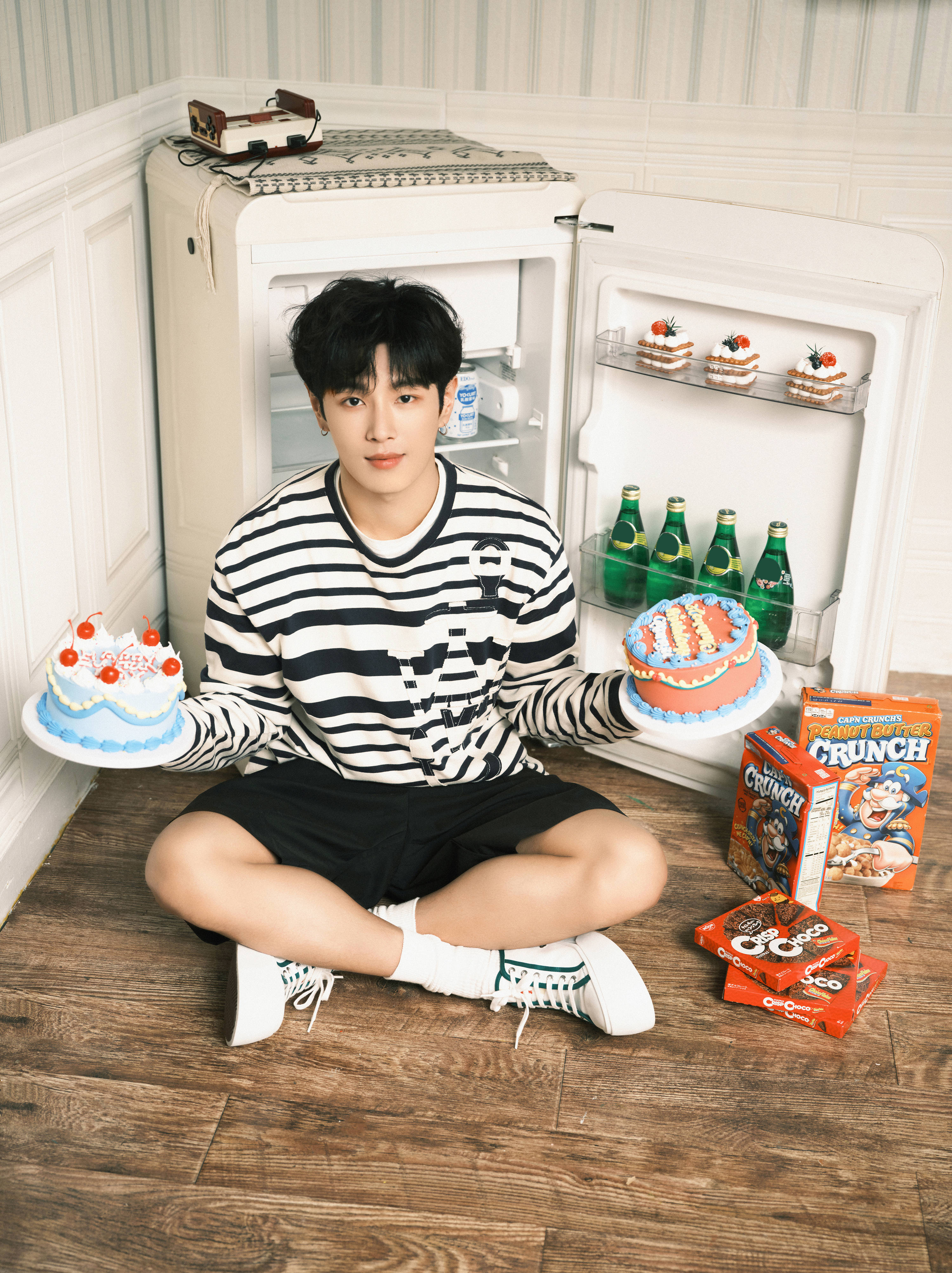
- Li in 2021
- Born: 22 July 1994 (age 32); Hangzhou, Zhejiang, China
- Occupations: Singer; actor
- Musical career
- Genres: Mandopop; K-pop
- Instruments: Vocals; guitar
- Years active: 2014–present
- Label: Yuehua
- Member of: Uniq
- Formerly of: Unine

Chinese name
- Chinese: 李汶翰
Transcriptions
Standard Mandarin
- Hanyu Pinyin: Lǐ Wènhàn

Li Wenhan (Chinese: 李汶翰; pinyin: Lǐ Wènhàn; born 22 July 1994) is a Chinese singer and actor. He is best known as the lead singer of Uniq, a Chinese-South Korean boy group formed by Yuehua Entertainment in 2014. In 2019, he participated in the Chinese survival program, Youth With You, finished 1st place, and debuted in Unine.

== Biography ==
=== 1994–2013: Early life and career beginnings ===
Li was born on 22 July 1994 in Hangzhou, Zhejiang. Wenhan has a background in classical guitar and swimming, practicing with Chinese Swimming Olympic Medalist, Sun Yang in their hometown of Hangzhou. Li had his first swimming experience when he was thrown into the water by his dad and ever since then, he has developed a love for swimming. While attending high school in the United States, he auditioned for Yuehua Entertainment and passed. Before debuting with Uniq, Li had appeared on television in a diving reality show which aired nationwide on JSTV in April 2013.

=== 2014–2018: Debut with Uniq and acting roles ===
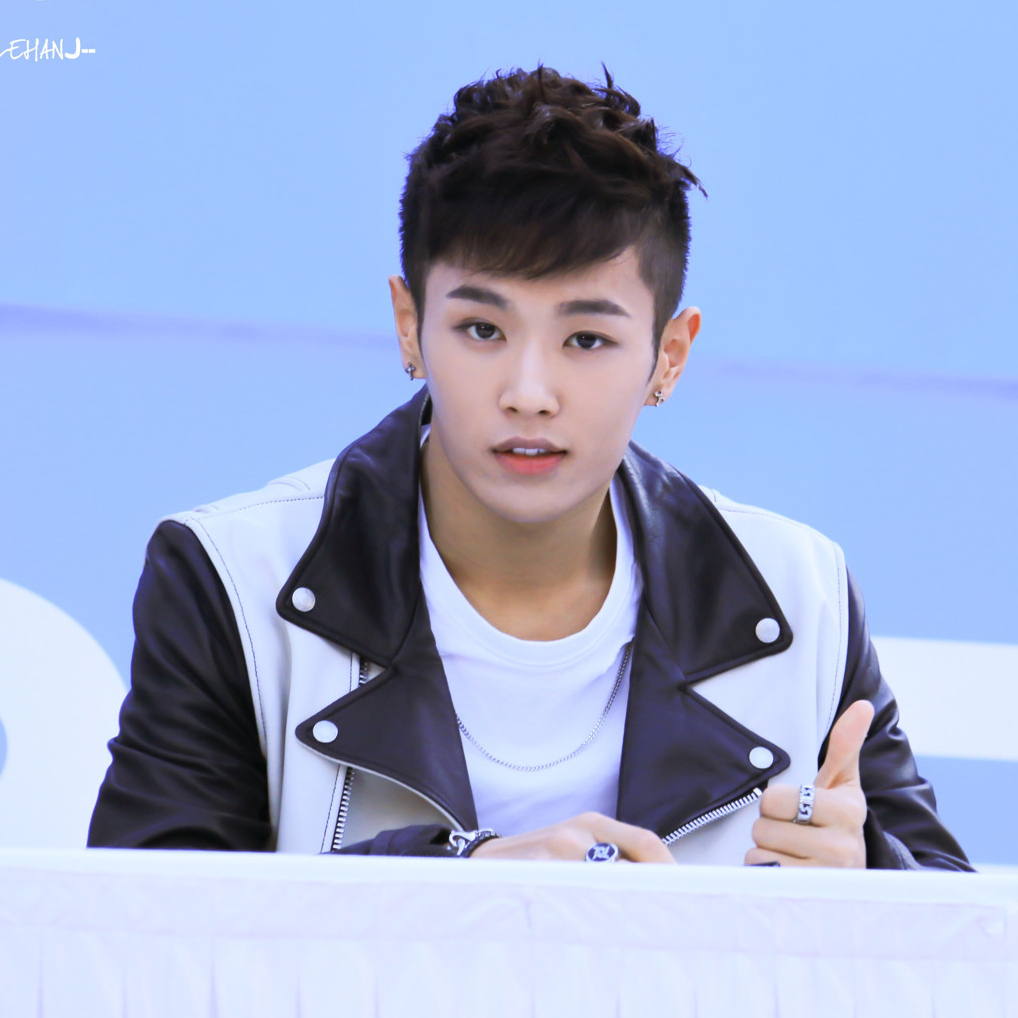
Li at a Uniq fansign event in 2015

Li and Wang Yibo were the first members recruited by Yuehua Entertainment, later joined by other three members. On 16 October 2014, Li debuted with Uniq.

From April to August 2016, he was a fixed cast of the Korean talk show Ni Hao China, which shared China's culture, lifestyle, tradition, economy, and more in an easily understandable and entertaining manner. Starting from late 2016, when tensions grew between China and South Korea because the United States and South Korea jointly announced the deployment of the Terminal High-Altitude Area Defense (THAAD), Wenhan was mainly active in China as an actor.

From June to September 2016, he was one of the main MCs for a Chinese sports variety program called 《星球者联盟》(The Players), which was a reality program featuring a group of Chinese celebrity contestants who face off in various basketball-related challenges against rival teams including guest stars such as Kim Jong-kook and Kobe Bryant. In October 2016, he was confirmed as cast in the historical drama set in the Tang dynasty era, 《熱血書院》(My Naughty Classmates) playing the prince Li Jingyu. "My Naughty Classmates" started airing every Wednesday on Youku from 4 July 2018.

In January 2017, he started filming for the romance web drama Adventurous Romance (命悬一线的浪漫) as the male lead. From 23 June to 27 September 2017 Wenhan filmed for the basketball idol drama titled 热血狂篮 (Basketball Fever), which is loosely based on the manga/anime Slam Dunk. His character is Pei Chenhao, who is a basketball player for Huayang University team and the female lead's younger brother. Basketball Fever was released on iQiyi on 16 May 2018. On 19 November 2017, Wenhan attended the opening ceremony for his upcoming drama, 《想看你微笑》aka Just Want to See You Smile in Wuxi, Jiangsu. Just Want to See You Smile is an idol style light romance comedy that was released on Youku on 29 May 2018 and adapted from the Internet popular novel 世界这么大，只想看你微笑.

On 16 April 2018, Li attended the opening ceremony for his new campus ping pong drama, Chasing the Ball (追球) in Shenzhen, China.

=== 2019–2020: Youth With You and debut with Unine ===
On 5 December 2018, Li announced on his personal Weibo account that he will be participating in Chinese reality boy band survival show Youth With You aired on iQiyi. He consistently placed first and eventually debuted with Unine with the center position, with a total of 8,457,091 votes in the final episode. Li filmed a variety show with his dad When I Grow Up《一路成年》which started airing on 27 August 2019 on Mango TV. On 5 September, Li was named the Chinese brand ambassador of ASH—艾熙, a prominent footwear company founded in 2000. Li became the brand ambassador for Primera芙莉美娜 (16 August 2019) and 舒肤佳Safeguard (18 August 2019). Li's sci-fi college romance drama, Adventurous Romance《命懸一線的浪漫》that he had filmed in January 2017 and started airing on 6 September 2019 on iQiyi. He became the brand spokesperson for 美达施Metamucil (23 September 2019) and OSM欧诗漫 (16 October 2019). On 16 April 2020 Wenhan was announced as the Spokesperson of ZEESEA滋色 Makeup. On 17 April 2020, it was announced that Li would participate in the dating variety show, 《喜欢你我也是2》 as a host. On 20 April 2020, it was announced that Li is the spokesperson for the popular ice cream brand 巧乐兹 via their official Weibo account. Li was announced as the official China brand ambassador of Elizabeth Arden on 29 April 2020.

On 13 July 2020, Li was confirmed to be in Dragon TV variety show, 《完美的夏天》(Perfect Summer), which is set to air every Saturday starting 1 August. In August 2020, Li became the celebrity judge for a video game contest variety show, 《荣耀美少女S2》or Glory Girls S2. On 24 September 2020, Li's show, 《2020超级企鹅联盟 SUPER PENGUIN LEAGUE》 started airing, which is described as China's first all-star basketball game reality show produced by Tencent Sports. Unine disbanded on 6 October 2020.

=== 2020–present: Solo career ===
Li became the MC of Youku's music show Super Hit or 《宇宙打歌中心》which started airing 22 November 2020. Li was announced to be a participant in a male boy band survival show called Shine! Super Brothers or《追光吧哥哥》and the show started airing on 5 December 2020. On 3 December 2020, it was announced that Li would participate in season 3 of Zhejiang TV's variety show 《 I am the Actor | 我就是演员》.

On 17 July 2021, Li released his first solo EP Wen《汶》. The EP title "Wen" is taken from the second word in the name of "Li Wenhan", which also represents the meaning of "water".

On 16 January 2022, Li attended the Press Conference for the Hangzhou Asian Games Organising Committee (HAGOC) authorized TV series Upstream《泳往直前》about swimming. Li is the male lead Zhou Yu in the swimming drama and during interviews Li said that he especially accepted the role because he was born in Hangzhou and was previously a representative of the Hangzhou Youth Swimming Team. After confirming his participation in the swimming drama Upstream, Li carried out strict special training; he trained, ate, and lived with professional swimmers together in order to create an immersive role.

== Artistry and influences ==
He has named Wang Leehom as his musical influence. Li has a background in classical guitar and has achieved professional guitar skills up to level 9. In sports, he has named Kobe Bryant, LeBron James, and Allen Iverson as his idols.

== Discography ==
=== EPs ===
Year	Album title	Track listing	Album details	Notes	Ref.
2018	《天荒不朽》	"天荒不朽 (Immortal Love)"; "一直在心上 (Always in My Heart)"	Release: 15 July 2018; Label: Yuehua Entertainment; Source: Netease Music; Format: digital download	Theme song for Youku series 热血学院	
2021	《汶》	"Darlin'"; "《唯一认可的爱》"; "《溯》"	Release: 17 July 2021; Label: Yuehua Entertainment; Source: QQ Music; Format: digital and physical album	First solo EP	
2023	《坠落在无垠浩翰》	"《坠落》"; "《观众》"; "《想你》"	Release: 6 July 2023; Label: Yuehua Entertainment; Source: QQ Music; Format: digital and physical album	Second solo EP	
2025	《理想國（Litopia)》	"《Treble & Bass》"; "《多好的你啊》"; "《I'm waiting》"; "《今夜，在我们的理想国跟随音乐一起摇摆》"; "《在太阳上狂奔》"	Release: 17 July 2025; Label: Yuehua Entertainment; Source: QQ Music; Format: digital album	Third solo EP	

=== Singles ===
Year	English title	Chinese title	Album	Notes	Ref.
2019	"Gummy Beach"	软糖沙滩	《追球Chasing Ball》OST	Release Date: 17 June 2019	
2019	"This Day"	這一天	"Adventurous Romance" Title OST《命懸一線的浪漫》	Release Date: 26 November 2019	
2019	"Summoning of the Stars"	星之召喚	"Adventurous Romance" OST《命懸一線的浪漫》	Release Date: 28 November 2019	
2020	"Look at Me, Looking at you"	《看你看我》	《喜欢你我也是2》OST	Release Date: 27 April 2020	
2020	"Bad Bad Bad"	《Bad Bad Bad》	solo from UNINE's《U-Night Flight》album	Release Date: 6 May 2020	
2022	"Meeting you"	《遇见你》	《遇见你 Almost Love》movie OST	Release Date: 4 July 2022	
2023	"White Dwarf"	《白矮星》	《白矮星/ White Dwarf》[The Single Album]	Release Date: 25 December 2023	
2024	"If it were me"	《如果是我》	《你就在我身边 You Are By My Side》movie OST	Release Date: 13 May 2024	
2025	"Thought you'd still come back"	《还以为会回来》	《还以为会回来》[The Single Album]	Release Date: 19 May 2025	

== Filmography ==
=== Film ===
Year	Title	Original title	Role	Ref.
2016	MBA Partners	梦想合伙人	Deliveryman	
2021	Our New Life	我们的新生活	Huang Xiao	
2022	Almost Love	遇见你	Zhou Can	
2024	You Are By My Side	你就在我身边	Shen Jia Bai	

=== Television series ===
Year	Title	Original title	Role	Streaming Network
2018	Hot Blood Academy (My Naughty Classmates)	热血学院	Prince Li JingYu	Youku
2018	Basketball Fever	热血狂篮	Pei Chenhao	iQIYI
2018	Just Want to See You Smile	想看你微笑	Shu Zhan	Youku
2019	Chasing the Ball	追球	Yun GaoYang	iQIYI
2019	Adventurous Romance	命悬一线的浪漫	Liu Xingyu	iQIYI
2021	The Flowers are Blooming	清风朗月花正开		iQIYI
2022	Upstream	泳往直前	Zhou Yu	Tencent
2024	Strange Tales of Tang Dynasty II To the West	唐朝诡事录·西行	Jiang Wei	iQIYI
2025	Hidden Shadow	烽影燃梅香	Mei Ting	Youkou
2025	Burning Night	燃霜为昼	Chen Jia Xue	Youku
2025	Surprise	惊欢	Cheng An	TBD

=== Variety shows ===
Year	Title	Original title	Network	Notes
2016	Nihao China	니하오 차이나	EBS	Expert Host Panel
2016	The Players	《星球者联盟》	东方卫视 Dragon TV	
2019	Youth With You	青春有你	iQiyi	Contestant
2019	When I Grow Up	《一路成年》	Mango TV	Appeared with his father
2020	The Treasured Voice S1	天赐的声音	Zhejiang TV	Contestant, Ep.3
2020	Super Penguin League; Season:3	超级企鹅联盟super3	Tencent	Player; Live Basketball Competition
2020	Yes, I Do	《喜欢你我也是2》	iQiyi	celebrity observation panel lineup
2020	Perfect Summer	《完美的夏天》	Dragon TV	fixed member
2020	Glory Girl S2	《荣耀美少女S2》	腾讯视频Tencent	Judge
2020	Super Penguin League 2020	《2020超级企鹅联盟 SUPER PENGUIN LEAGUE》	腾讯视频Tencent	celebrity lineup
2020	Super Hit	《宇宙打歌中心》	Youku	MC
2020	Shine! Super Brothers	《追光吧！哥哥》	Youku and Dragon TV	celebrity contestant
2020	I Am the Actor	《 我就是演员》	Zhejiang TV	
2021	Youth and Melody	金曲青春	Dragon TV	Contestant, Yuehua Ent Representative
2021	Perfect Summer 2	《完美的夏天2》	Dragon TV	fixed

== Awards and nominations ==
Year	Award	Category	Result	Ref.
2018	2018 Weibo Fan Festival	"温柔蜜音满腹经纶小狼狗奖" ("Soft Honey Vocals full of the Abs of little WolfDog Award")	Won	
2019	2019明星权力榜 (2019 Star Power List)	"年度最受欢迎潜力新星" ("Most Popular Star with Potential")	Won	
2021	TMEA盛典红毯 (Tencent Music Ent. Awards) 12.11.2021	年度最佳舞台演绎 “Best Performance of the Year” award	Won	
2021	新浪时尚风格大赏 (Sina Fashion Style Awards) 12.19.2021	年度突破艺人 (Breakthrough Artist of the Year)	Won	
2021	2021凤凰网时尚之选 (2021 iFeng Fashion Choice) 12.28.2021	年度先锋 (Pioneer Singer of the Year) Award.	Won	
