= List of songs written by Woodz =

South Korean singer-songwriter, rapper and record producer Woodz has writing and production credits for over 118 songs. He has worked on songs for his own musical career, including songs recorded as a member of the South Korean–Chinese boy band Uniq and songs released under his former stage name and birth name Luizy and Cho Seung-youn respectively, as well as collaborations and works for other artists. Woodz has 99 works officially registered and credited by the Korea Music Copyright Association (KOMCA).

== Songs ==
Key
†	Indicates single

Year	Song	Artist	Album	Label	Lyrics		Music		Notes
Year	Song	Artist	Album	Label	Credited	With	Credited	With	Notes
2014	"Falling in Love"	UNIQ	EOEO	Yuehua Entertainment	Yes	Kim Sung-joo, Matthew Heath, Grady Griggs	No	N/A	Unregistered on KOMCA
2015	"EOEO"	UNIQ	EOEO	Yuehua Entertainment	Yes	Deanfluenza	No	N/A	Unregistered on KOMCA
2015	"Luv Again"	UNIQ	EOEO	Yuehua Entertainment	Yes	DJ Nüre, Francis Sooho Kim	No	N/A	Unregistered on KOMCA
2015	"Listen To Me"	UNIQ	EOEO	Yuehua Entertainment	Yes	Atozzio, Jarah Gibson	No	N/A	Unregistered on KOMCA
2015	"Slave"	Luizy	non-album release	N/A	Yes	N/A	No	N/A	Original track: Big Sean - Blessings Instrumental. Unregistered on KOMCA
2015	"My Way" (마이웨이)	M.O.L.A	non-album release	N/A	Yes	Park Ji-min, NATHAN	Yes	Park Ji-min, NATHAN	Released on YouTube, SoundCloud.Unregistered on KOMCA
2015	"Best Friend"	UNIQ	non-album single	Yuehua Entertainment	Yes	Kim Sung-joo	No	N/A	N/A
2015	"Trick Or Treat" (속았지?)	M.O.L.A	non-album release	N/A	Yes	Park Ji-min, NATHAN	Yes	Park Ji-min, NATHAN	Released on SoundCloud.Unregistered on KOMCA
2015	"Erase Your Little Sadness"	UNIQ	non-album release	Yuehua Entertainment	Yes	Zhou Yixuan	No	N/A	SpongeBob SquarePants OST. Unregistered on KOMCA
2016	"Body To Body" (흔들어)	Seung Youn	non-album release	N/A	Yes	N/A	Yes	N/A	Unregistered on KOMCA
2016	"peaceful life"	Luizy	non-album release	N/A	Yes	N/A	No	N/A	Original track: "JOY" (90 BPM) hip-hop sample beat. Unregistered on KOMCA
2016	"DREAMIN ALLDAY"	Luizy	non-album release	N/A	Yes	N/A	No	N/A	Unregistered on KOMCA
2016	"Rehab"	Luizy	non-album release	N/A	Yes	N/A	Yes	NATHAN	Unregistered on KOMCA
2016	"Recipe"	Luizy, Flowsik	non-album single	Yuehua Entertainment	Yes	Flowsik, EDEN	Yes	EDEN, NATHAN	N/A
2016	"Baby Ride" ft. Im Hyun-sik	Luizy	Baby Ride	Yuehua Entertainment	Yes	EDEN	Yes	EDEN, NATHAN	N/A
2016	"How Have You Been" (요즘 뭐 해)	Luizy	Baby Ride	Yuehua Entertainment	Yes	N/A	Yes	EDEN, NATHAN	N/A
2016	"Freeman"	Cho Seung-youn	non-album release	N/A	Yes	N/A	Yes		Performed in the "Track Mission 4" on Unpretty Rapstar 3. Unregistered on KOMCA
2017	"Eating Alone" (혼밥)	Luizy, Im Hyun-sik	Sing For You - Seventh Story Change	MCC Entertainment	Yes	Im Hyun-sik	No	N/A	Featured in episode 14 of Sing For You
2017	"Chillin'"	M.O.L.A	non-album release	N/A	Yes	Park Ji-min, NATHAN	Yes	Park Ji-min, NATHAN	Released on SoundCloud. Unregistered on KOMCA
2017	"Chillin' (Remix)"	M.O.L.A	non-album release	N/A	Yes	Park Ji-min, NATHAN, Kino, Vernon	Yes	Park Ji-min, NATHAN, Kino, Vernon	Released on YouTube, SoundCloud; a remix of the original song by M.O.L.A featuring verses by new members Kino and Vernon Unregistered on KOMCA
2017	"Dream" (꿈) ft. Luizy	Lee Gi-kwang	ONE	Around Us Entertainment	Yes	Lee Gi-kwang, Kim Tae-sung, Joo Chan-yang	No	N/A	N/A
2018	"Always" (Note: Cho is not officially credited by the Korea Music Copyright Association for "Always"; however, it was disclosed in official supplemental information for THE UNI+ G STEP 1 that he had co-produced the song. Original text from Melon: ""Always"는 최근 Fromis_9의 유리구두를 작업한 아이코닉 사운즈의 Sophia [Pae] 프로듀서가 작업한 곡으로 [...] 이번 곡은 또한 스웨덴 유명 프로듀싱 팀 Hitfire의 프로듀서 Simon Janlöv와 아이코닉 신인 프로듀서 조승연이 함께 작업한 곡으로 ..." (Translation: ""Always" is a song made by ICONIC SOUNDS producer Sophia [Pae], who also recently worked on Fromis 9's "Glass Shoes". [...] The song was co-produced by Simon Janlöv, a member of the famous Swedish production team Hitfire, and rookie ICONIC SOUNDS producer Cho Seung-youn ..."))	Blooming (The Unit: Idol Rebooting Project)	THE UNI+ G STEP 1	Interpark	No	N/A	Yes	Sophia Pae, Simon Janlöv	Performed in episode 24 of The Unit: Idol Rebooting Project; released as a digital single as part of the show's fourth mission
2018	"93"	EDEN	RYU: 川	KQ Entertainment	No	N/A	Yes	EDEN, NATHAN	N/A
2018	"Dance" (춤) ft. Woodz	EDEN	RYU: 川	KQ Entertainment	Yes	EDEN	No	N/A	N/A
2018	"it's ok"	You Zhangjing, Ling Chao, Bi Wenjun, Li Xikan, Jeffrey, Lin Chaoze, Lin Yanjun, Zheng Ruibin, Xiao Gui, Justin (Idol Producer)	Idol Producer OST	iQiyi	Yes	EDEN, NATHAN, Lu Yiqiu (Chinese lyrics)	Yes	EDEN, NATHAN	Performed as a debut evaluation song in episode 12 of Idol Producer
2018	"Pool"	WOODZ	non-album single	Yuehua Entertainment	Yes	Sumin	Yes	Sumin, Cha Cha Malone, Maxx Song	N/A
2018	"Wave" (파도) ft. Woodz	Killagramz	HUE. 休	Kiwi Media Group (Cycadelic Records)	Yes	Killagramz	Yes	Killagramz, RAUDI	N/A
2018	"ZIGZAG"	MR-X	ZIGZAG	Mavericks Entertainment	No	N/A	Yes	Command Freaks	N/A
2018	"Different"	WOODZ	non-album single	Yuehua Entertainment	Yes	Maxx Song, Cha Cha Malone	Yes	Maxx Song, Cha Cha Malone	N/A
2018	"Hold It Down"	Jun	non-album single	Discovery Young	Yes	N/A	Yes	EDEN, NATHAN	N/A
2018	"Evanesce II" (백야)	Super Junior-D&E	'Bout You	SM Entertainment (Label SJ)	No	N/A	Yes	Maxx Song, Jabong	N/A
2018	"Drive"	EDEN, Babylon, Woodz	EDEN_STARDUST.04	KQ Entertainment	Yes	EDEN, BUDDY, HLB	Yes	EDEN, BUDDY	N/A
2018	"PUTP" (전화받아) ft. Kino, Woodz, NATHAN	Park Ji-min	jiminxjamie	JYP Entertainment	Yes	Vernon, Kino, Park Ji-min, NATHAN	Yes	Vernon, Kino, Park Ji-min, NATHAN	N/A
2018	"I Don't Wanna Fight Tonight"	MR-X	I Don't Wanna Fight Tonight	Mavericks Entertainment	No	N/A	Yes	Secret Weapon, Maxx Song	N/A
2018	"Bad" ft. Woodz	KRIZ	non-album single	N/A	Yes	KRIZ, Kino, PIGMA	Yes	KRIZ, Kino	N/A
2018	"Sincerity" ft. Sophia Pae	Babylon	Caelo	KQ Entertainment	Yes	Babylon, Sophiya, NATHAN, KRIZ	Yes	NATHAN, KRIZ	N/A
2018	"Drive"	Babylon	Caelo	KQ Entertainment	Yes	EDEN, Babylon, BUDDY, HLB	Yes	EDEN, BUDDY	A solo version of the original song by EDEN, Babylon, and Woodz, featuring additional lyrics
2018	"meaningless" (아무의미)	WOODZ	non-album single	Yuehua Entertainment	Yes	N/A	Yes	NATHAN	N/A
2019	"This Night" (행성) ft. Blue.D, Jhnovr	Groovy Room	This Night	H1ghr Music	No	N/A	Yes	Groovy Room, Jhnovr, Blue.D	N/A
2019	"Ice & Fire"	ONF	We Must Love	WM Entertainment	Yes	MonoTree, Wyatt, TOTEM	Yes	MonoTree, TOTEM	N/A
2019	"Don't Hang Up" (전화끊지마) ft. PH-1	Suran	Jumpin'	SM Entertainment (Million Market)	Yes	Suran, PH-1, Serum	Yes	Suran, KRIZ	N/A
2019	"Blossom"	Ravi, Eunha	The Love of Spring	Starship Entertainment	No	N/A	Yes	Groovy Room, Ravi	Used in promotional material for Pepsi
2019	"Dream"	Cho Seung-youn, Hwang Geum-ryul, Yu Seong-jun (Produce X 101)	non-album release	N/A	Yes	N/A	Yes	NATHAN	Performed by Yuehua Entertainment trainees in episode 2 of Produce X 101
2019	"Dream"	WOODZ, NATHAN (demo)	non-album release	N/A	Yes	N/A	Yes	NATHAN	Original full demo version later released on YouTube
2019	"Fly High"	Li Quanzhe	non-album single	Yuehua Entertainment	No	N/A	Yes	Kyuwon Kim, Kofi Owusu-Ofori	N/A
2020	"ROCKSTAR REMIX" (original by postmalone)	WOODZ	non-album release	N/A	Yes	N/A	Yes	NATHAN	Released on YouTube, remix of "Rockstar" by Post Malone
2020	"Chak Chak" (착착)	WOODZ	non-album release	N/A	Yes	N/A	Yes	Stally, X&	Used in promotional material for Cledbel
2020	"Lift Up"	WOODZ	Equal	Yuehua Entertainment	Yes	N/A	Yes	NATHAN	N/A
2020	"Accident"	WOODZ	Equal	Yuehua Entertainment	Yes	N/A	Yes	POPTIME, NATHAN	N/A
2020	"Love Me Harder" (파랗게)	WOODZ	Equal	Yuehua Entertainment	Yes	N/A	Yes	POPTIME, NATHAN	N/A
2020	"NOID"	WOODZ	Equal	Yuehua Entertainment	Yes	Mia	Yes	POPTIME, NATHAN	N/A
2020	"Waikiki" ft. Colde	WOODZ	Equal	Yuehua Entertainment	Yes	Colde	Yes	Colde, Stally	N/A
2020	"BUCK" ft. Punchnello	WOODZ	Equal	Yuehua Entertainment	Yes	Punchnello	Yes	NATHAN	N/A
2020	"Memories" (주마등)	WOODZ	Equal	Yuehua Entertainment	Yes	Eunyeong, Byemysai, Mio, Lee Se-ryeong, Woodzla, In Ji-yoon, Lee Jae-won, Lee Ju-hae, wangdangyu, Nangmanjeogin, Kim Ji-an	Yes	Colde, Johnny, Chiic	N/A
2020	"Bless You" ft. Sam Kim, Woodz, pH-1	Primary	non-album single	Paktory Company	Yes	pH-1, Ayul, Primary	Yes	Primary	N/A
2020	"Trigger" (방아쇠)	WOODZ	Woops!	Yuehua Entertainment	Yes	N/A	Yes	NATHAN	N/A
2020	"BUMP BUMP"	WOODZ	Woops!	Yuehua Entertainment	Yes	N/A	Yes	NATHAN	N/A
2020	"On my own" (내 맘대로)	WOODZ	Woops!	Yuehua Entertainment	Yes	N/A	Yes	NATHAN, HoHo	N/A
2020	"Thanks to"	WOODZ	Woops!	Yuehua Entertainment	Yes	N/A	Yes	NATHAN	N/A
2020	"Sweater" ft. Jamie	WOODZ	Woops!	Yuehua Entertainment	Yes	Park Ji-min	Yes	Poptime, Park Ji-min, Kako	N/A
2020	"Tide"	WOODZ	Woops!	Yuehua Entertainment	Yes	N/A	Yes	NATHAN	N/A
2021	"Feel Like"	WOODZ	SET	Yuehua Entertainment	Yes	N/A	Yes	NATHAN	N/A
2021	"Touché" ft. MOON	WOODZ	SET	Yuehua Entertainment	Yes	Su-jin Moon	Yes	NATHAN, Su-jin Moon, HoHo	N/A
2021	"Rebound"	WOODZ	SET	Yuehua Entertainment	Yes	Jang Eun-kyung	Yes	NATHAN	N/A
2021	"Lullaby"	WOODZ	non-album single	Yuehua Entertainment	Yes	N/A	Yes	Han Sang Ju, Maxx Song	Released as part of Baverse documentary series
2021	"Multiply"	WOODZ	ONLY LOVERS LEFT	Yuehua Entertainment	Yes	Tiyon "TC" Mack	Yes	Tha Aristocrats, Tiyon "TC" Mack	N/A
2021	"Thinkin bout you"	WOODZ	ONLY LOVERS LEFT	Yuehua Entertainment	Yes	Tiyon "TC" Mack	Yes	Tha Aristocrats, Tiyon "TC" Mack	N/A
2021	"Sour candy"	WOODZ	ONLY LOVERS LEFT	Yuehua Entertainment	Yes	N/A	Yes	NATHAN, HoHo	N/A
2021	"Kiss of fire"	WOODZ	ONLY LOVERS LEFT	Yuehua Entertainment	Yes	Tiyon "TC" Mack	Yes	Tha Aristocrats, Tiyon "TC" Mack, NATHAN	N/A
2021	"Chaser"	WOODZ	ONLY LOVERS LEFT	Yuehua Entertainment	Yes	N/A	Yes	NATHAN	N/A
2021	"WAITING"	WOODZ	ONLY LOVERS LEFT	Yuehua Entertainment	Yes	N/A	Yes	NATHAN, HoHo	N/A
2021	"MIA" ft. CAMO, WOODZ	Gemini	Inside Out	@AREA	Yes	Gemini, CAMO, Carson City	No	N/A	N/A
2022	"Dirt on my leather"	WOODZ	COLORFUL TRAUMA	Yuehua Entertainment	Yes	N/A	Yes	NATHAN, HoHo	N/A
2022	"HIJACK"	WOODZ	COLORFUL TRAUMA	Yuehua Entertainment	Yes	NATHAN	Yes	NATHAN, HoHo	N/A
2022	"I Hate You" (난 너 없이)	WOODZ	COLORFUL TRAUMA	Yuehua Entertainment	Yes	N/A	Yes	NATHAN, HoHo	N/A
2022	"Better And Better"	WOODZ	COLORFUL TRAUMA	Yuehua Entertainment	Yes	N/A	Yes	NATHAN	N/A
2022	"Hope to be like you" (안녕이란 말도 함께)	WOODZ	COLORFUL TRAUMA	Yuehua Entertainment	Yes	N/A	Yes	NATHAN	N/A
2022	"FINE" (ft. SOMA, Woodz)	BOYCOLD	DAFT LOVE	Sony Music	Yes	SOMA	Yes	BOYCOLD, SOMA	N/A
2022	"World Changer"	WOODZ	non-album release	N/A	Yes	N/A	Yes	NATHAN	Used for the 2022 MAMA Awards collaboration stage between Street Man Fighter and Kang Daniel
2023	"Abyss"(심연)	WOODZ	OO-LI	Edam Entertainment	Yes	N/A	Yes	NATHAN, HoHo	N/A
2023	"Deep Deep Sleep"	WOODZ	OO-LI	Edam Entertainment	Yes	Robb Roy	Yes	NATHAN	N/A
2023	"Journey"	WOODZ	OO-LI	Edam Entertainment	Yes	Robb Roy	Yes	Robb Roy, MILLIC	N/A
2023	"Drowning"	WOODZ	OO-LI	Edam Entertainment	Yes	N/A	Yes	NATHAN, HoHo	N/A
2023	"Busted"	WOODZ	OO-LI	Edam Entertainment	Yes	N/A	Yes	NATHAN, HoHo	N/A
2023	"Who Knows"	WOODZ	OO-LI	Edam Entertainment	Yes	NATHAN, Robb Boy	Yes	NATHAN, HoHo, Robb Boy	N/A
2023	"Ready To Fight"	WOODZ	OO-LI	Edam Entertainment	Yes	N/A	Yes	NATHAN, HoHo	N/A
2023	"A Walk In Paris"	WOODZ	non-album release	N/A	Yes	NATHAN	Yes	NATHAN, HoHo	Released on YouTube
2023	"MIA - Remix" ft. CAMO, WOODZ	Gemini	Love Sick	@AREA	Yes	Gemini, CAMO, Carson City	No	N/A	N/A
2023	"AMNESIA"	WOODZ	AMNESIA	Edam Entertainment	Yes	N/A	Yes	NATHAN, HoHo	N/A
2023	"BEHIND" (비하인드)	WOODZ	AMNESIA	Edam Entertainment	Yes	N/A	Yes	NATHAN, HoHo	N/A
2024	"The Ugly Duckling" (미운 오리 새끼)	YENA	Good Morning	Yuehua Entertainment	No	YENA, NATHAN, TWLV	Yes	YENA, NATHAN, HoHo	N/A
2024	"카더라"	WOODZ	non-album release	N/A	Yes	N/A	Yes	NATHAN, HoHo	Released on SoundCloud
2024	"Dance With Me"	WOODZ	non-album release	N/A	Yes	N/A	Yes	NATHAN	Released on SoundCloud
2024	"Tom & Jerry"	WOODZ	non-album release	N/A	Yes	N/A	Yes	Millennium, Sakehands2	Released on SoundCloud
2024	"IG"	GroovyRoom, Gemini, DAWN, Jay Park, Vince	At H1ghr	H1ghr Music	Yes	Gemini, Trade L, Jay Park, Vince	Yes	GroovyRoom, Gemini, Trade L, Anthony Russo	N/A
2024	"순수"	WOODZ	non-album release	N/A	Yes	Robb Roy	Yes	NATHAN, HoHo, Robb Roy	Released on SoundCloud
2024	"love your lies"	WOODZ	non-album release	N/A	Yes	N/A	Yes	NATHAN, HoHo	Released on SoundCloud
2024	"나의 겨울"	WOODZ	non-album release	N/A	Yes	N/A	Yes	NATHAN, HoHo	Released on SoundCloud
2025	"AMNESIA" (Japanese ver.)	WOODZ	non-album release	Edam Entertainment	Yes	Kanata Nakamura	Yes	NATHAN, HoHo	Released on YouTube
2025	"I'll Never Love Again"	WOODZ	I'll Never Love Again	Edam Entertainment	Yes	N/A	Yes	NATHAN, HoHo	N/A
2025	"Smashing Concrete"	WOODZ	I'll Never Love Again	Edam Entertainment	Yes	N/A	Yes	NATHAN, HoHo	N/A
2025	"Falling" ft. Young K	WOODZ	non-album single	Edam Entertainment	Yes	Young K	Yes	Young K, NATHAN, HoHo	N/A
2026	"00:30"	WOODZ	Archive. 1	Edam Entertainment	Yes	N/A	Yes	NATHAN, HoHo, MILLENNIUM	N/A
2026	"Super Lazy"	WOODZ	Archive. 1	Edam Entertainment	Yes	NATHAN, Jiselle	Yes	NATHAN, HoHo	N/A
2026	"Dayfly" (하루살이)	WOODZ	Archive. 1	Edam Entertainment	Yes	N/A	Yes	NATHAN, HoHo	N/A
2026	"The Spark" (화근)	WOODZ	Archive. 1	Edam Entertainment	Yes	N/A	Yes	NATHAN, HoHo	N/A
2026	"Human Extinction"	WOODZ	Archive. 1	Edam Entertainment	Yes	N/A	Yes	NATHAN, HoHo	N/A
2026	"Stray" (비헹)	WOODZ	Archive. 1	Edam Entertainment	Yes	N/A	Yes	NATHAN, HoHo	N/A
2026	"Bloodline"	WOODZ	Archive. 1	Edam Entertainment	Yes	NATHAN, Rollo, John Robert Hall	Yes	Ryan Linvill, NATHAN, HoHo	N/A
2026	"Downtown"	WOODZ	Archive. 1	Edam Entertainment	Yes	NATHAN, Jiselle	Yes	NATHAN, HoHo	N/A
2026	"Stop That"	WOODZ	Archive. 1	Edam Entertainment	Yes	NATHAN, Jiselle	Yes	NATHAN, HoHo, Roar	N/A
2026	"Na Na Na"	WOODZ	Archive. 1	Edam Entertainment	Yes	NATHAN, Jiselle	Yes	NATHAN, HoHo	N/A
2026	"Struggle" (몸부림)	WOODZ	Archive. 1	Edam Entertainment	Yes	N/A	Yes	NATHAN, HoHo	N/A
2026	"Beep"	WOODZ	Archive. 1	Edam Entertainment	Yes	N/A	Yes	NATHAN, HoHo	N/A
2026	"Plastic"	WOODZ	Archive. 1	Edam Entertainment	Yes	NATHAN, Jiselle	Yes	NATHAN, HoHo	N/A
2026	"Glass"	WOODZ	Archive. 1	Edam Entertainment	Yes	NATHAN, Kella Armitage, Saint Kid	Yes	Ryan Tutton, NATHAN, HoHo	N/A
2026	"Cinema"	WOODZ	Archive. 1	Edam Entertainment	Yes	NATHAN, Robb Roy	Yes	NATHAN, HoHo, Robb Roy	N/A
2026	"Samo" (사모)	WOODZ	Archive. 1	Edam Entertainment	Yes	N/A	Yes	NATHAN, HoHo	N/A
2026	"To My January"	WOODZ	Archive. 1	Edam Entertainment	Yes	N/A	Yes	NATHAN, HoHo	N/A
2026	"To My January" (Acoustic ver.)	WOODZ	Archive. 1	Edam Entertainment	Yes	N/A	Yes	NATHAN, HoHo	Released exclusively on LP edition
2026	"Journey" (Japanese ver.)	WOODZ	non-album release	Edam Entertainment	Yes	Robb Roy, Kanata Nakamura	Yes	Robb Roy, MILLIC	Released on YouTube
2026	"OUR STORY" (우리만의 이야기)	WOODZ, Lee Seung-chul	40th Anniversary Tribute Duet VOICE TO VOICE	LSC Co	Yes	N/A	Yes	NATHAN, sid	N/A
2026	"Come into my world!"	WOODZ	non-album single	Edam Entertainment	Yes	N/A	Yes	NATHAN, sid	N/A
