= You Zhangjing =

- 尤长靖
- Born: Yu Chang Chin; 19 September 1994 (age 31); Batu Pahat, Johor, Malaysia
- Other name: Azora Chin
- Occupations: Singer; Music Producer
- Musical career
- Genres: C-pop
- Instruments: Vocals; piano; guitar
- Years active: 2017–present
- Label: Banana Culture
- Formerly of: Nine Percent

Chinese name
- Traditional Chinese: 尤長靖
- Simplified Chinese: 尤长靖
Transcriptions
Standard Mandarin
- Hanyu Pinyin: Yóu Zhǎngjìng
- Wade–Giles: Yu Chang-ching
Yue: Cantonese
- Jyutping: Jau4 Coeng4 Zing6
Southern Min
- Hokkien POJ: Iû Tióng-chēng

You Zhangjing (simplified Chinese: 尤长靖; traditional Chinese: 尤長靖; Jyutping: Jau4 Coeng4 Zing6; Pe̍h-ōe-jī: Iû Tióng-chēng; born 19 September 1994) also known as Azora Chin, is a Malaysian singer and songwriter based in mainland China. He was the main vocalist of Chinese boy group Nine Percent created by 2018 Chinese survival show Idol Producer. He released his first solo single Yesterday in 2018.

== Personal life ==
You Zhangjing was born and raised in Batu Pahat, Johor, Malaysia. His early education was in the Chinese schools in Batu Pahat. His alma mater is Chinese High School Batu Pahat. His family consists of his father, mother, a younger sister and him. He moved to China to be in the undergraduate programme of pop music in the University of Nanjing Arts.

== Endorsements ==
Ninepercent was an endorser for many popular brands in China – Innisfree, PizzaHut and Fendi in 2018, Individually, You Zhangjing was chosen to be the endorser and spokesperson for chewing gum brand, Wrigley's, and skin care brands, Mistine, Tripollar and Snail White and Hong Kong–based food brand Wan Chai Ferry Peking Dumplings. In early 2019, he was chosen to represent technology giant Panasonic and since early June, he has been appointed the spokesperson of Tropicana China. He has also been appointed the spokesperson for Wrigley's two years in a row.

== Filmography ==
=== Variety shows ===
Year	Title	Chinese Title	Network	Notes
2018	Idol Producer	偶像练习生	iQiyi	Contestant; 9th place
2018	Perfect Restaurant	完美的餐厅	Youku	Regular cast-member
2019	Beautiful Youth	青春的花路	iQiyi	Regular cast-member
2019	Mr. Housework	做家务的男人	iQiyi	Regular Member

== Discography ==
=== Extended plays ===
Title	Album details
Azoraland ·我是尤长靖	Released: 27 October 2020; Language: Mandarin; Track listing: 1. "一颗星的夜"; 2. "一个人记得"; 3. "荒诞学家"; 4. "AZORAland"; 5. "到时见"; 6. "是你想成为的大人吗"; 7. "害怕回家的人最孤独"; 8. "如果你也这样过"; 9. "Outro"

=== Singles ===
Title	Year	Notes
"Ao Hong Chen" (傲红尘)	2018	Legend of Fuyao OST
"Crystal Sky of Yesterday" (昨日青空)	2018	Crystal Sky of Yesterday OST
"Western Encounter" (西遇)	2018	Dunhuang Academy project
"Christmas" (有你)	2018	
"Miss You"	2019	Ad song for Wrigley's
"爱不由我"	2019	Go Go Squid! OST
"被劫持的思念"	2019	Soul Mate OST
"Leave Me Alone" (寂寞寂寞就好)	2019	Track 11
"Lian Ming Dai Xing" (连名带姓)	2019	青春重置计划「原来都是葛大为」Track 07

=== Collaborations ===
Title	Year
"Rock the Show" (with TRAINEE 18)	2018
"Drifting North" (飘向北方) (with LIL-EM)	2018
"Hi Wake Up" (with Fan Chengcheng, Zhu Zhengting, Wang Ziyi, Fei Qiming and After Journey	2019
"Magical Chinese Characters" (神奇的汉字) with TONG, Hu Yitian, Justin and Dylan Wang	2019
"投己所好" with Victor Wong	2019

== Awards and nominations ==
Year	Category	Nominated work	Result	Ref
2018	NetEase Yun National Wind Bliss Night Music Festival	New Wind Male Singer	Won	
