= Chase Me (TV series) =

Chinese reality show

- Traditional Chinese: 追我吧
- Simplified Chinese: 追我吧
- Hanyu Pinyin: Zhuī wǒ ba
- Genre: Reality show
- Starring: See below
- Country of origin: China
- Original language: Standard Chinese
- No. of episodes: 12 (planned); 3 (broadcast)

Production
- Camera setup: Multicamera setup
- Production company: Zhejiang Television

Original release
- Network: Zhejiang Television
- Release: 8 November – 22 November 2019

Chase Me (Chinese: 追我吧) was a Chinese reality show broadcast by Zhejiang Television. Chase Me was shot in the central business district of Ningbo, involving two teams competing in challenges at night hours. The show premiered on 8 November 2019 and ended abruptly on 22 November 2019.

On 27 November 2019, filming and broadcast were suspended following the sudden death of model-actor Godfrey Gao while filming its ninth episode; the fourth episode that was due to air two days later was not broadcast. On 5 December 2019, Zhejiang TV announced that Chase Me would be pulled from airing indefinitely, after three episodes of airing.

== Cast (Chase Me team members) ==
- Hua Shao (MC)
- William Chan (episodes 1–3)
- Huang Jingyu (episodes 1–3)
- Jam Hsiao (episodes 1–2)
- Fan Chengcheng (episodes 1–3)
- Zhong Chuxi (episodes 1–2)
- Song Zu'er (episodes 1–3)
- Wu Xuanyi (episodes 3)

== Episodes ==
- Episode 1 (Airdate: 8 Nov 2019)

In the first episode, the team members competed against people who possess strong physical strength.

Order	Chase Me team	Chaser	Winner
1	Fan Chengcheng	Hong Xiaolong (bodybuilding champion)	Hong Xiaolong
2	Song Zu'er	Shi Wei (sports enthusiast)	Shi Wei
3	William Chan	Yi Erpan (national basketball team member)	William Chan
4	Huang Jingyu	Shen Chen (sniper)	Huang Jingyu
5	Jam Hsiao & Zhong Chuxi	Tu Yuexiu (MMA fighter)	Tu Yuexiu

- Episode 2 (Airdate: 15 Nov 2019)

In the second episode, Chase Me team members joined alongside previous Olympic medalists, then divided into Blue and Yellow teams to compete against each other.

Order	Chase Me members		Chaser	Winner
Order	Yellow team	Blue team	Chaser	Winner
1	Li Xiaopeng	Zou Shiming	-	Li Xiaopeng
2	Huang Jingyu, Guo Yue	-	Fang Bin (sports enthusiast)	Fang Bin
3	-	William Chan, Chen Ruolin	Zhang Jingkun (cycling champion)	Zhang Jingkun
4	Fan Chengcheng, Chen Ruolin, Mo Shunjia (triathlete), Song Zu'er	Jam Hsiao, Guo Yue, Wei Sicheng (arm wrestler), Zhong Chuxi	-	Yellow team

- Episode 3 (Airdate: 22 Nov 2019)

In the third episode, Chase Me team members faced off against the cast of Keep Running.

Order	Chase Me team	Keep Running team	Chaser	Winner
1	William Chan	Zheng Kai	-	William Chan
2	Huang Jingyu, Fan Chengcheng	Li Chen, Lucas Wong	Fang Bin	Fang Bin
3	Wu Xuanyi	Song Yuqi	-	Wu Xuanyi
4	Huang Jingyu, Song Zu'er, William Chan, Wu Xuanyi	Lucas Wong, Zheng Kai, Li Chen, Song Yuqi	-	Keep Running team

- Episode 4 (Unaired)

At the end of Episode 3, it was announced that the guests in Episode 4 were UNINE and NEXT.

Episode 4 was originally due to be aired on 29 November 2019, but was cancelled (see below).

== Cancellation ==
On 27 November, while filming the ninth episode in Ningbo, model-actor Godfrey Gao suddenly collapsed and was brought to the hospital, but was pronounced dead three hours later after several resuscitation attempts. Gao died due to a sudden cardiac arrest, after over 17 hours of filming. Another celebrity in the same episode, Li Wenhan, reported injuries due to a twisted ankle, and the producers decided to suspend the filming of the episode.

Following the death, the show faced criticisms in which contestants were involved in a number of high-risk challenges late at night. The lack of safety standards for reality programs in China was also highly scrutinised.

Zhejiang TV pulled the broadcast of episode four (which was initially scheduled to aired 29 November) and until today it has remained unaired. On 5 December, the show was finally announced cancelled after three episodes of air in the aftermath of Gao's death, and Zhejiang TV and the show's director shortly apologized on Sina Weibo and acknowledged the lapse of safety of the cast members involved in the program.

== See also ==
- The Late, Late Breakfast Show – a British light entertainment show, which was also cancelled after a fatality as a result of a stunt gone wrong
