= Xiao Gui =

Xiao Gui may refer to:

- Alien Huang, Taiwanese singer
- Wang Linkai, Chinese singer
