= Zhu Zhengting =

Chinese singer and actor (born 1996)

Zhu Zhengting (Theo Zhu)
- 朱正廷
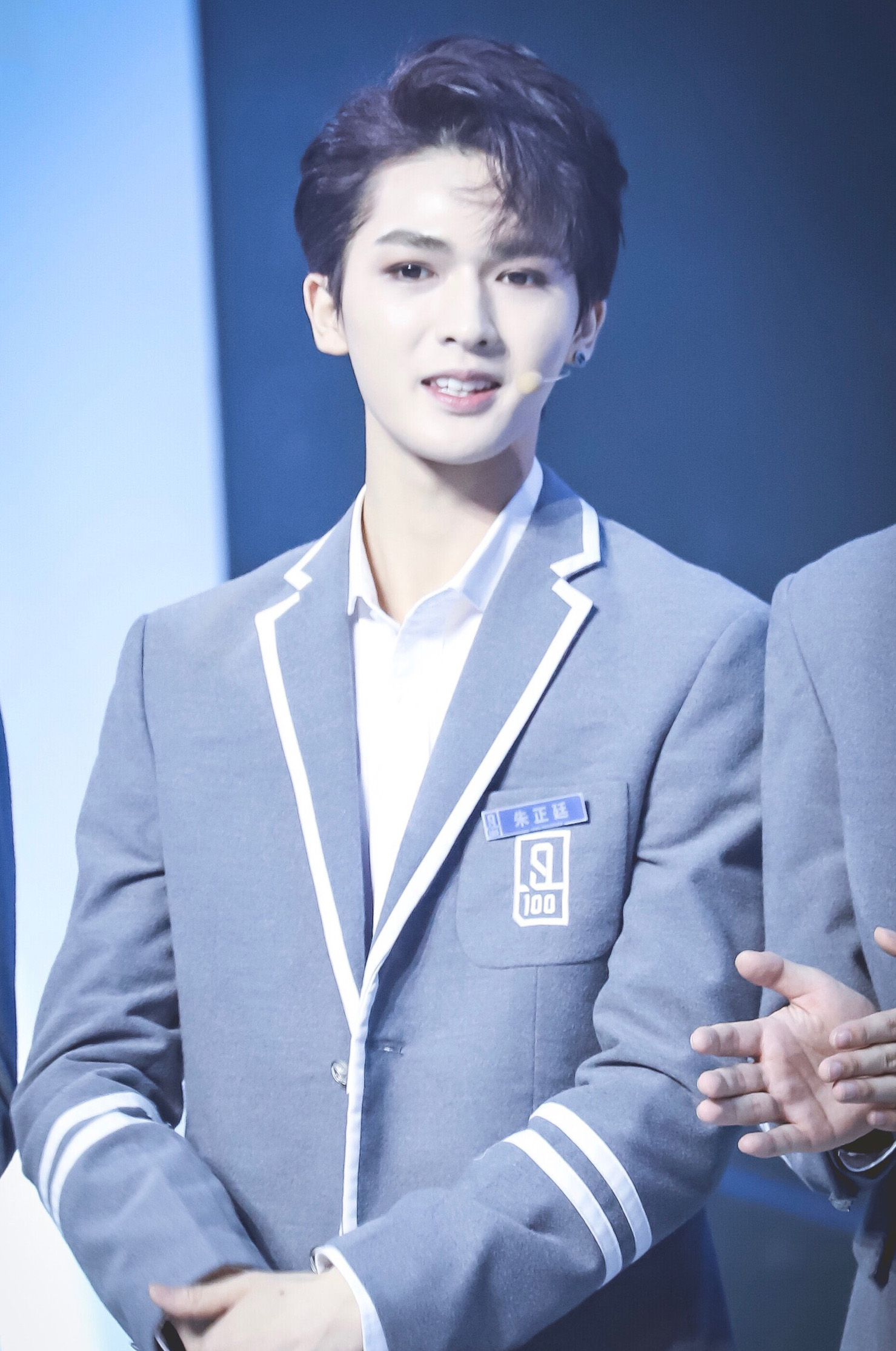
- Zhu in 2018
- Born: Zhu Zhengting; March 18, 1996 (age 30); Ma'anshan, Anhui, China
- Education: Shanghai Theatre Academy – Chinese Dance Department
- Alma mater: Shanghai Theatre Academy; Shanghai Dance School
- Occupations: Singer; dancer; actor
- Musical career
- Genres: C-pop
- Instrument: Vocals
- Years active: 2017–present
- Label: YH
- Member of: Next
- Formerly of: Nine Percent

Chinese name
- Traditional Chinese: 朱正廷
- Simplified Chinese: 朱正廷
Transcriptions
Standard Mandarin
- Hanyu Pinyin: Zhū Zhèngtíng
- Bopomofo: ㄓㄨ ㄓㄥˋ ㄊㄧㄥˊ
- Wade–Giles: Chu^{1} Chèng^{4}-t'ing^{2}

Zhu Zhengting (Chinese: 朱正廷, born March 18, 1996) is a Chinese singer and actor. He debuted as a member of limited boy band Nine Percent in 2018 through the Chinese talent show Idol Producer. He is currently the leader and main dancer of YH's Next.

== Early career ==
At the age of 8, he studied Chinese Traditional dance, When he turned 12, he studied ballet, and at 15, he then majored in modern and contemporary dance.

In 2014, Zhu admitted into the Shanghai Theatre Academy as the first Chinese dance major, after winning first place in the Chinese Dance Theater Competition of National Vocational Vocal Skills Competition. Zhu was a trainee in YH Entertainment before his debut as an artist in the same company.

== Career ==
=== 2017: Produce 101 ===
Zhu participated in boy group survival reality show, Produce 101 which aired on Mnet in 2017. He was eventually eliminated on episode 8 with a total vote of 330,058.

=== 2018–present: Idol Producer, debut with Nine Percent, Next and solo activities ===
After his elimination in the Korean series Produce 101 Season 2, he participated in a similar Chinese survival boy band show, Idol Producer. Zhu's performance in the show brought his rise to fame, and eventually garnered a total of 11,938,786 votes in the last episode. He debuted as a member of project group Nine Percent after placing sixth overall.

On June 21, 2018, Zhu debuted as the leader of Chinese boy group Next, with the song "Wait a Minute". On June 23, 2018, Zhu and other members of Next held their first fan meeting in Beijing, China.

On December 2, 2018 YH Entertainment confirmed that Zhu would be releasing his first solo single titled "The Winter Light" the following day and that he would also be releasing a single early next year. The single sold over one million digital copies within the first three minutes of its release and over two million within an hour. Following "The Winter Light", Zhu released a single titled "Green Christmas".

On March 18, 2019, Zhu released a new single called "待签收" (English: Waiting to be Signed).

On September 16, 2019, the first teaser for his first solo mini album came out. The single "Flip" came out on September 23, followed by the rest of the songs "都要好好的" and "旁观者" on September 27. Within six days of release, Chapter Z became the best selling music on Netease of the year with 10 million albums sold.

On October 3, 2019 the teaser for the music video for "Flip" came out, with the official music video dropping on October 10.

On May 6, 2020 he came out with his new single "Empty Space" featuring his ex-groupmate from Nine Percent rapper Wang Ziyi.

He released a new single on his birthday March 18, 2021 titled "陷" (Trap) on Netease Music selling 100,000 copies on the first 28 minutes.

He was also named as the ambassador of Shanghai Public and Safety Officer.

Effective May 22, 2021, Zhu was named and appointed as the Protector of Endangered Species by Society of Entrepreneurs & Ecology (SEE).

On January 30, 2022, his first drama Floating Youth officially came out. The drama is dedicated to the 2022 Beijing Winter Olympics, and centers around a university hockey team.

He is appointed by Tencent as the Fashion Star Officer for Paris Fashion Week 2022.

== Endorsements ==
In 2018, Zhu was chosen by multiple brands. He endorsed hygiene products such as Head & Shoulders and Oral-B as well as clothing brand Calvin Klein, technology giant Huawei and beauty brands Olay and Perfect Diary. In 2019, he was signed under Paul Frank and also endorsed products by leading camera manufacturer Canon and beauty brands Nivea among others.

In 2020, Zhu continuously became brand ambassador for Hugo Boss, Fuguang, Marubi, Chow Sang Sang, Watson's, Rio, Kimberlite Diamond, Estée Lauder, Gucci, Valentino et al.

In 2021, he added Laneige, ISDIN, Vans, and Meco to his endorsements.

As of 2022, his active endorsements are with Tissot, SSR Yoghurt, and UNNY CLUB. He is also the spokesperson for Youku VIP membership.

== Discography ==
=== Album and extended plays ===
Title	Album details	Sales
Chapter Z	Released: September 29, 2019; Language: Mandarin; Labels: Yuehua Entertainment; Track listing: 1. Flip; 2. 都要好好的; 3. 旁观者	CNY: 1,982,960+
《T》	Released: June 27, 2022; Language: Mandarin; Labels: Yuehua Entertainment; Track listing: 1. 戒备	TBA

=== Singles ===
Title	Year	Peak chart positions	Sales	Album
Title	Year	CHN (Note: The Billboard China Top 100 was launched in January 2019 by Billboard China bust was shut down in September that year.)	Sales	Album
"The Winter Light" (冬日告白)	2018	—N/a	3,078,866	Non-album single
"Want U"	2018	—N/a	—N/a	Next to You
"Green Christmas" (绿色圣诞节)	2018	49	—N/a	Non-album single
"Waiting for a Sign" (待签收)	2019	—N/a (Note: Billboard China Top 100 shut down in September 2019)	660,172	Non-album single
"You're My Light"	2019	—N/a	—N/a	Non-album single
"Flip"	2019	—N/a	—N/a	Chapter Z
"Time to Live" (活着的时间)	2019	—N/a	54,692	Non-album single
"Empty Space" (ft. Wang Ziyi)	2020	—N/a	907,703	Non-album single
"Sink" (陷)	2021	—N/a	262,242	Non-album single
"—" denotes releases that did not chart or were not released in that region.

== Filmography ==
=== Films ===
Year	Title	Chinese title	Role	Notes
2018	Marna	初恋的滋味	Li Cong	Second male lead, movie unreleased
2020	Vanguard	急先锋	Shendiao	Initial release date January 25, 2020 was postponed and was released September 1, 2020

=== Television series ===
Year	English title	Chinese title	Role	Network	Notes/Ref.
2022	Floating Youth	冰球少年	Shen Zhouzhou	Mango TV	
2022	Shining Just for You	星河长明	Yi Wuyou	Youku	
2022	The Silence of the Monster	孤独的野兽	Luo Bin / "Robin"	iQIYI	
2023	To Ship Someone	全世界都在等你们分手	Ji Shu	iQIYI	
2024	Burning Flames	烈焰	Nitian Erxing	iQIYI	
2024	Dashing Youth	少年白马醉春风	Lin Yue / "Beili Master Xiu Shui"	Youku	Support role
2025	Moonlit Reunion	子夜归	Pei Jiya	Tencent	Cameo
TBA	Su Ji	苏记	Qi Fengxiang	Youku	
TBA	You Are a Lover in the Mortal World	你是人间惊鸿客	Xiao Chi	iQIYI	
TBA	Red Dance Shoes	红舞鞋	Su Yang	Tencent	

=== Television shows ===
Year	Title	Network	Role
2017	Produce 101	Mnet	Contestant (Trainee)
2018	Idol Producer	iQIYI	Contestant (Trainee)
2018	Nine Percent: Flower Road Journey	iQIYI	Regular cast member
2018	Fantasy Restaurant	iQIYI	Regular cast member
2018	Space Challenge	iQIYI	Regular cast member
2018	We Are Not At Home Tomorrow	Hunan/Mango TV	Regular cast member
2019	Master in the House	Hunan/Mango TV	Regular cast member
2019	Beautiful Youth	iQIYI	Regular cast member
2019	More Than Forever	iQIYI	Regular cast member
2019	King of Bots 2	Zhejiang TV	Regular cast member
2019	Let's Fall In Love Season 1	Youku	Regular cast member
2019	Masked Singer Season 4	Dragon TV	Regular cast member
2020	Woof Meow Story	Youku	Regular cast member
2020	Let's Fall In Love Season 2	Youku	Regular cast member
2020	The Greatest Dancer	Dragon TV	Dance Captain/Mentor
2020	Youth With You Season 2	iQIYI	Special Mentor
2021	Super Hit Season 1	Youku	Regular cast member
2021	Youth and Melody	Dragon TV	Regular cast member
2021	Let's Fall In Love Season 3	Youku	Regular cast member
2021	Intangible Cultural Heritage at Your Fingertips	Youku	Regular cast member
2022	Snow Day	Youku	Regular cast member
2022	Masked Dance King 2022	Zhejiang TV	Regular cast member
2023	Asia Super Young	TVB, Youku	Mentor

== Awards ==
Year	Event	Category
2018	NetEase Awards	Popularity Supernova
2018	16th Esquire Man At His Best Awards	Charity Ambassador of the Year
2018	COSMO Fashion Beauty Ceremony	Most Handsome Male Idol of the Year
2018	Baidu Annual Conference	Annual Rising Star of the year
2019	Figaro Fashion	Most Fashionable and Charming Singer of the Year
2019	HELLO Children's Charity Project	Public Welfare Ambassador of the Year
2019	MAHB Awards	Leap Idol of the Year
2019	Sohu Fashion Festival	Fashion Influential Male Artist of the Year
2020	Sina Fashion Style Awards	Hot Fashion Artist of the Year
2020	Sina Fashion Style Awards	Sustainable Development of Fashion Brands of the Year Award (Brand Ambassador)
2021	Super Hit Awards	Best & Most HIT Singer
2021	Super Hit Awards	Most Charming Stage
2021	Madame Figaro Fashion Gala	Most Fashionable and Charming Singer of the Year
2021	OK! Magazine 8th Anniversary Magazine Awards	Most Popular and Beloved Male Artist of the Year
2021	China (Shanghai) Public Welfare Concert	Youth Public Welfare Ambassador
2021	Rayli Beauty Awards 2021	Most Promising Actor of the Year
2021	Sina Fashion Awards 2021	Fashion Pioneer Artist of the Year
