= Lingyu =

Lingyu may refer to:

- Volkswagen Passat Lingyu, car model
- The World of Fantasy (靈域; Língyù), 2021 Chinese TV series
- Lingyu (mythology), a fictional creature in Chinese literature that may have influenced depictions of the Japanese creature ningyo
