= Kimberlite Diamond =

Chinese Diamond Jewellry Manufacturer

- Native name: 金伯利钻石
- Industry: Jewellery, Retail
- Founded: 1995
- Founder: Liusheng Dong
- Headquarters: Shanghai, China
- Number of locations: 700
- Area served: China, Hong Kong, Canada, Belgium
- Services: Retail
- Website: www.kimberlite.com.cn/index.php

Kimberlite Diamond (Chinese: 金伯利钻石) is China's first diamond jewellery manufacturer and retailer with a nationwide sales network.

== History ==
Kimberlite Diamond was founded in 1995 and the brand is China's first diamond-based retailing jewelry company. In 1997, the company reached a "Quality Appraisal Agreement" with the HRD (Belgian High-level Diamond Council). In September, 1998, Kimberlite became a member of the Gems & Jewelry Association of China.

In 2007, Kimberlite Diamond Design's work "SOPRANO (Soprano)" was one of the finalists for the "Opera Night" Diamond Design Competition in the HRD AWARDS 2007 held by the Belgian High-level Diamond Council. Kimberlite Diamond Design's "Diamond Mustache" was one of the finalists for the "Best Design Work" at the HRD AWARDS 2009 Diamond Design Competition. On January 19, 2011, the brand received the "Leopold Knight Medal" from the Order of Leopold. In 2013, the "2013 Asia Top 500 Brands" was released at the 8th Asian Brand Gala in Hong Kong, and Kimberlite Diamond ranked at 153 among the Top 500 Asian Brands. In November 2015, Kimberlite Diamond Design's piece "Past Fragments" won the 23rd Hong Kong JMA International Jewelry Design Competition.

Kimberlite Diamond is sponsor of the first season of the Chinese variety show, Go Fighting!.

== Distribution network ==
=== Boutiques ===
Bund No.3 Flagship Boutique

Kimberlite Diamond Vancouver Boutique

Kimberlite Diamond opened its first store in Mainland China on May 18, 1995.

In 1999, Kimberlite Diamond opened its 100th store.

In 2000, Shanghai Kimberlite Diamond Co., Ltd was formed and in May of the same year, the first store opened in Shanghai.

In 2009, Shanghai Kimberlite Diamond became the official partner of the 2010 Shanghai Expo Belgium-EU Pavilion. It also become the licensed manufacturer and retailer of the 2010 Shanghai Expo.

In 2014, Kimberlite Diamond founded China's first youth diamond fashion brand - KELLAN diamonds, and opened its first flagship store in Shanghai on September 19.

As of 2016, the distribution network and branches in mainland China, Hong Kong, Canada and Belgium included nearly 600 franchise stores, covering 30 provinces and cities in China and the brand was China's largest diamond retailer.

In May, 2018, Kimberlite Diamond unveiled its new Shanghai flagship at the landmark Bund No.3.

On July, 06 2018, Kimberlite Diamond launched its first boutique in Vancouver, Canada located at South Granville.

=== Industrial Park ===
Kimberlite Diamond's diamond industrial park in Pudong, Shanghai covers an area of 22,000 square metres (240,000 ft^{2}), covering the import sorting, cutting, diamond designing, gold production mosaic, and all aspects of the diamond supply chain with design processing capacity up to 150,000 carats. The Kimberlite Diamond Industrial Park which was completed on October 9, 2008, is the first diamond industrial park in Shanghai built by Kimberlite Diamond and is also the biggest in China.

== Design ==
Wenjun Zhu, the chief designer of Kimberlite Diamond, has designed several high jewellery collections for Kimberlite Diamond every year, including Our Story, The Charm of China, Harmony, and Sino-Song collection. In 2014, Kimberlite Diamond also collaborate with famous Italian designers Loretta Baiocchi and Emanuela Tersch. In 2016, Kimberlite Diamond collaborated with Sarah Ho, a well-known jewelry designer to launch the "Harmony" collection together.

== Charity ==
Since 2004, Kimberlite Diamond launched a project to improve the level of primary education in Henan Province. From 2004 to 2007, Kimberlite Diamond has donated over three hundred thousand US dollars to build two primary schools in Nan Cao Village in Kaifeng City and funded seventy thousand US dollars' worth of scholarships to students who wish to go to school. In 2009, Kimberlite Diamond donated two million USD to build Kimberlite Hope Secondary School to improve the local school conditions. It is free of charge for students living in the community.

In 2010, Kimberlite Diamond joined the charity auction event held by Consulate General of Belgium in Shanghai and Benelux Chamber of Commerce. The award-winning fine jewelry "SOPRANO" was donated for the auction event to support those Chinese children who lost their family.

In April 2016, Kimberlite Diamonds donated 600,000 yuan to three impoverished students from Henan, China.

The fourth Kimberlite Diamond Hope School will be completed in September 2018.

== Gallery ==
Dew On Magnolia

The Moon Goddess

Eternal Star

Melting Iceberg
