= Shake It Up (Chinese TV series) =

- Simplified Chinese: 新舞林大会
- Literal meaning: Let's Shake It
- Genre: Reality-talent show
- Country of origin: China
- Original language: Chinese
- No. of seasons: 1
- No. of episodes: 12

Production
- Production location: China
- Running time: 90 minutes

Original release
- Network: Dragon Television
- Release: July 22 – October 7, 2018

Shake It Up (Chinese: 新舞林大会) is a Chinese reality dance series produced by Dragon Television. The show officially aired and broadcast online on July 22, 2018 on Dragon Television.

== Concept ==
Shake It Up brings celebrities together in China and Taiwan to compete.

== Contestants ==
| Contestant | Age | Occupation | Notes |
|---|---|---|---|
| Dilraba Dilmurat | June 3, 1992 (age 33) | Actress | |
| Joker Xue | July 17, 1983 (age 42) | Singer | |
| Jane Zhang | October 11, 1984 (age 41) | Singer | |
| Wang Ziyi | July 13, 1996 (age 29) | Singer | |
| Xu Weizhou | October 20, 1994 (age 31) | Actor | |
| Mao Xiaotong | February 16, 1988 (age 38) | Actrese | |
| Deng Lun | October 21, 1992 (age 33) | Actor | |
| Ren Jialun | April 11, 1989 (age 36) | Actor | |
| Qin Lan | July 17, 1981 (age 44) | Actress | |
| Dong Jie | April 19, 1980 (age 45) | Actress | |
| Rainie Yang | June 4, 1984 (age 41) | Singer | |
| Sheng Yilun | September 23, 1992 (age 33) | Actor | |
| Zhong Chuxi | March 18, 1993 (age 32) | Actress | |
| Jiro Wang | August 24, 1981 (age 44) | Singer | |
| Neo Hou | August 3, 1997 (age 28) | Actor | |
| Jackson Yee | November 28, 2000 (age 25) | Singer | |
| Wu Xin | January 29, 1983 (age 43) | Actress | |
| Leo Wu | December 26, 1999 (age 26) | Actor | |
| Victoria Song | February 2, 1987 (age 39) | Singer | |
| Jing Tian | July 21, 1988 (age 37) | Actress | |
| Wallace Chung | November 30, 1974 (age 51) | Actor | |
| Huo Siyan | October 23, 1981 (age 44) | Actress | |
| Zheng Kai | April 17, 1986 (age 39) | Actor | |
| Huang Xuan | March 3, 1985 (age 40) | Actor | |
