= Nine Percent =

Chinese boy band

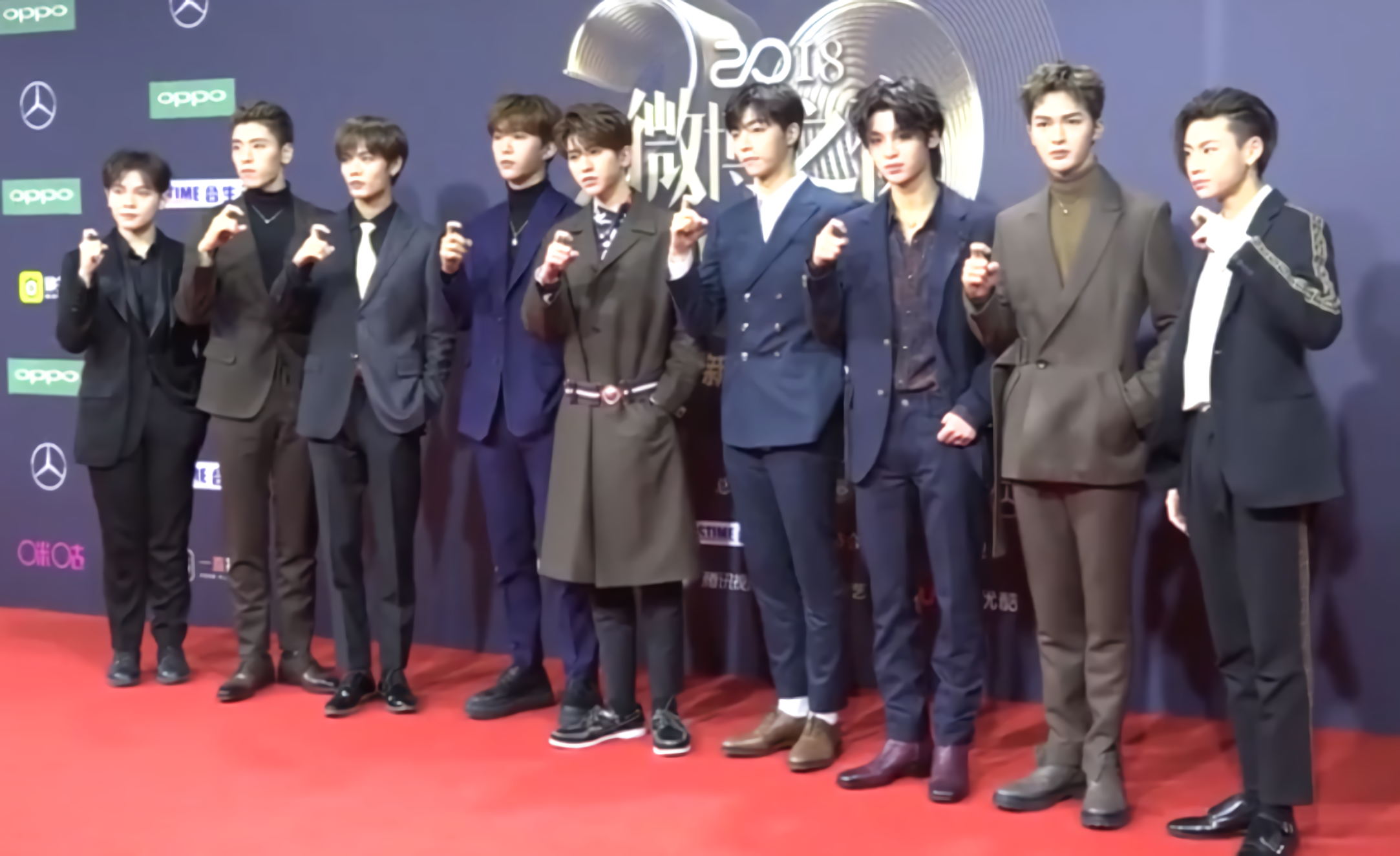
- Nine Percent at 2018 Weibo Awards on January 11, 2019; From left to right: Azora Chin, Wang Ziyi, Lin Yanjun, Fan Chengcheng, Cai Xukun, Chen Linong, Justin Huang, Zhu Zhengting, and Lil Ghost

Background information
- Origin: Beijing, China
- Genres: C-pop; Mandopop
- Years active: 2018–2019
- Labels: Beijing Idol Century; YongDaoXing (Beijing); Sony
- Past members: Cai Xukun; Chen Linong; Fan Chengcheng; Justin Huang; Lin Yanjun; Zhu Zhengting; Wang Ziyi; Lil Ghost; Azora Chin
- Website: ninepercent.com

Chinese name
- Chinese: 百分九少年
- Literal meaning: The Top 9 Boys Out of 100
Transcriptions
Standard Mandarin
- Hanyu Pinyin: bǎifēn jiǔ shàonián
- Bopomofo: ㄅㄞˇ ㄈㄣ ㄐㄧㄡˇ ㄕㄠˋ ㄋㄧㄢˊ

Nine Percent (Chinese: 百分九少年; commonly stylized in all-caps) was a nine-member Chinese boy group formed by the survival show Idol Producer by iQIYI on April 6, 2018. The group promoted for 18 months since formation.

Nine Percent was one of the most popular boy groups in 2018. Their fans are estimated to have generated 20 million RMB of Idol Producer's revenue, with their debut album To the Nines earning more than 10 million RMB in domestic sales.

== History ==
=== 2018: First public performance and Debut with To the Nines ===
The group was formed through the Chinese reality survival show Idol Producer where the audience voted for the group's members. This ran from January 19 to April 6, 2018. After the finale of the show, they were sent to train for half a month in Los Angeles under the guidance of Rodney Jerkins and Christopher Scott. In May, the group held their first public performance in Shanghai, performing 8 songs from the survival show.

On May 25, their official Weibo account announced the group's fandom name, "Nine's", and chose to be represented by the colours PANTONE325C and PANTONE7456C .

They released their debut album To the Nines on November 12. They gave their first live performance at M space, a music venue in Beijing, to a group of 500 fans. The show was also live-streamed through the online platforms hosted by the Tencent Music Entertainment Group, including QQ Music, Kuwo and Kugou, which garnered up over 15 million clicks. Within 3 days of the album being released it made almost 8 million yuan ($1.15 million) in sales. The album also accumulated almost a million digital sales and landed at No. 2 on the now defunct Billboard China V chart.

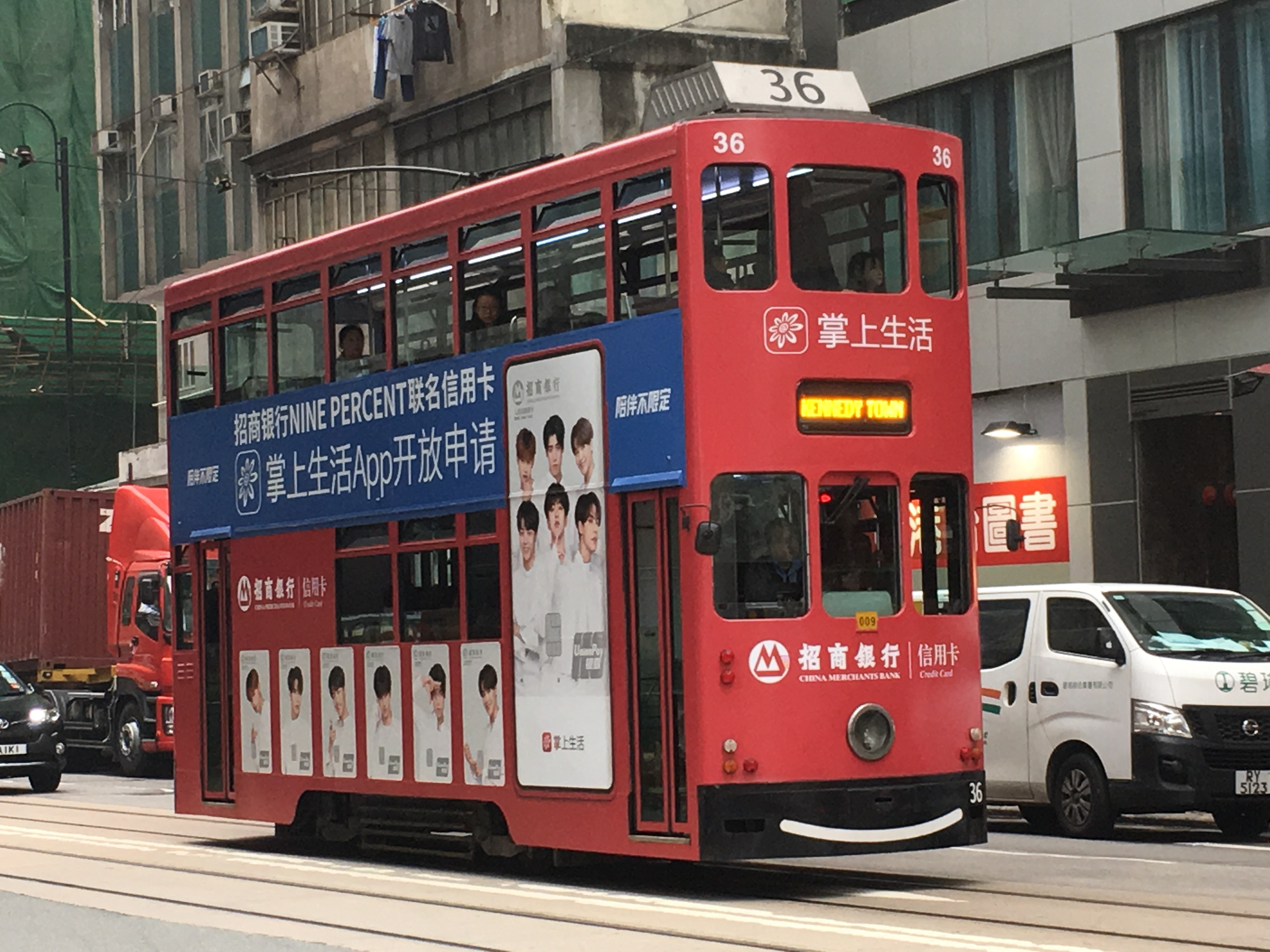
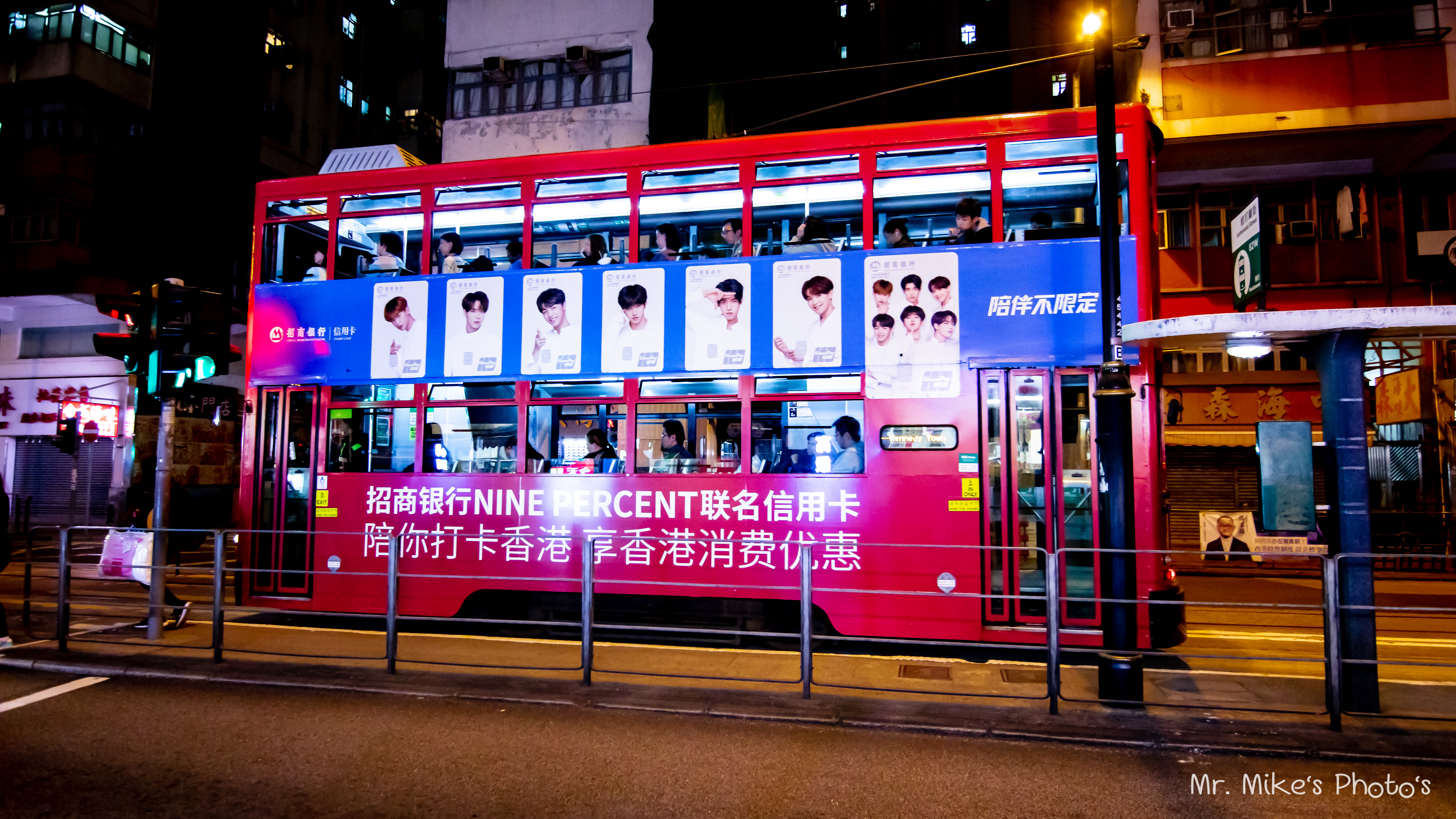
China Merchants Bank partnered with Nine Percent to launch co-branded credit cards in China. From November 8, 2018 to January 2, 2019, the advertisements were placed on Hong Kong's Ding Ding trams as part of their launch campaign. (Chengcheng, Justin, and Zhengting, all of whom were under Yuehua Entertainment at the time, were absent for unknown reasons.)

=== 2019: More Than Forever, and disbandment ===
On September 23, the poster for the group's farewell show, More Than Forever, was released. The documentary showed the group prepare themselves for their final performance with each member having a chance to express their feelings after being together for 18 months. On September 24 the group's new album, also named More Than Forever (限定的记忆), was announced to come out on September 26 and will feature 9 solo tracks from each of the members.

On October 6, the group disbanded and on October 12, they held their farewell concert in Guangzhou. The livestream of the concert, which was made available to IQIYI VIP members, garnered 400 million likes and more than 1.2 million views. Approximately 80,000 iQiyi VIP members participated in the concert's while 8 topics related to the concert made it onto Weibo's list of trending topics, which in total gathered an accumulated readership of over 1 billion.

== Members ==
- Cai Xukun (蔡徐坤)
- Chen Linong (陈立农)
- Fan Chengcheng (范丞丞)
- Justin (黄明昊)
- Lin Yanjun (林彦俊)
- Zhu Zhengting (朱正廷)
- Wang Ziyi (王子异)
- Xiao Gui (小鬼)
- You Zhangjing (尤长靖).

== Controversy over lack of promotions ==
In August and October 2018, many netizens criticized iQIYI for failing to provide more opportunities for the group. The lack of group performances, as well as the members' tendency to work on their own, led fans to suspect that the group Nine Percent might exist in name only. Although they were incredibly popular in China, the total number of days they worked as a group was only about 60. Most fans blamed the company, Idol Century, for the poor management of the group; 55% of the shares of Idol Century are owned by iQIYI, and the company was founded shortly after Idol Producer ended. Fans criticised the company for immediately holding fan meetings and concerts for the group with the same songs from the show without releasing a new album.

Shortly after Nine Percent's debut, Yuehua Entertainment unveiled their latest boy band, NEXT (formerly known as NEX7), with members Zhu Zhengting, Fan Chengcheng and Justin Huang, which resulted in them being more involved in NEXT than Nine Percent. According to an article on one of China's largest social platforms, Weibo, the lack of promotion Nine Percent received made the members more like solo singers or actors than members of a group. Even in their last album, More Than Forever, it was pointed out that there were no songs sung by the members as a group, resulting in more fans who only liked one or a few members of the group than fans who liked the group as a whole.

== Discography ==
=== Studio albums ===
Title	Album details	Sales
To the Nines	Released: November 12, 2018; Language: Mandarin; Label: Sony Music Entertainment China; Track listing: 1. 创新者 (Rule Breaker); 2. I Need A Doctor; 3. Good Things; 4. 了不起的9% (Extraordinary 9%); 5. Ei喔Ei喔 (Ei Oh Ei Oh); 6. 一起跳舞吧 (Let's Dance Together); 7. 离不开 (Inseparable)	CHN: 1,378,683
More Than Forever (限定的记忆)	Released: September 26, 2019; Language: Mandarin; Label: Sony Music Entertainment China; Track Listing: 1. 梦 (Dream); 2. 为你绽放 (Blooming for You); 3. Umbrella; 4. 挣脱 (Struggle Free); 5. Like A Star; 6. Hi Buddy (一路同行); 7. Lovelab; 8. 热气球 (Hot Air Balloon）; 9. Maybe Someday	CHN: 904,666

=== Singles ===
Title	Year	Peak chart positions	Sales	Album
Title	Year	CHN	Sales	Album
"创新者" (Rule Breaker)	2018	75	CHN: 400,000+	To The Nines
"离不开" (Inseparable)	2018	—	CHN: 120,000+	To The Nines
"—" denotes releases that did not chart or were not released in that region.

=== Other charted songs ===
Title	Year	Peak chart positions	Sales	Album
Title	Year	CHN	Sales	Album
"I Need A Doctor"	2018	6	CHN: 250,000+	To The Nines
"Good Things"	2018	14		To The Nines
"—" denotes releases that did not chart or were not released in that region.

== Filmography ==
=== Television shows ===
Year	Title	Network	Notes
2018	Idol Producer	iQIYI	As contestants
2018	Nine Percent: Flower Road Journey	iQIYI	The group's first reality show
2019	More Than Forever	iQIYI	The group's last reality/documentary show

== Awards and nominations ==
Award	Year	Nominated work	Category	Result	Ref.
iQiyi Scream Night	2018	Nine Percent	Group of the Year	Won	
iQiyi Scream Night	2018	Nine Percent	Scream Boy Group	Won	
iQiyi Scream Night	2018	Idol Producer	Best Variety Show	Won	
Migu Music Awards	2018	Nine Percent	Most Popular Male Artist of The Year	Won	
Migu Music Awards	2018	Nine Percent	Most Popular Group of The Year	Won	
Migu Music Awards	2018	To The NINES	Best Digital Album	Won	
Weibo Night	2019	Nine Percent	Weibo's Best Group of the Year	Won	

== Concerts and tours ==
=== Headlining concerts ===
- THX with Love (2018)
- 专辑分享会 (2018)
- More Than Forever Final Concert [限定的记忆] (2019)
