= The World of Fantasy =

- Teaser poster
- Traditional Chinese: 靈域
- Simplified Chinese: 灵域
- Literal meaning: The Spiritual Realm
- Hanyu Pinyin: líng yù
- Genre: Costume drama Romance; Fantasy; Love; Immortals; Idol
- Created by: Ni Cang Tian
- Based on: Spiritual Realm
- Written by: Guo Baoxian
- Directed by: Liang Guoguan; Jones
- Starring: Adam Fan( Fan Chengcheng): Cheng Xiao; Liu Yitong; Nie Zihao Ma Yue
- Composers: Ding Shuang; Tan Jiajian; Kang Shan; Xu Peng
- Country of origin: China
- Original language: Mandarin
- No. of episodes: 36

Production
- Executive producer: Wang Xiaohui
- Producers: Li Weiying, Liu Xiaofeng
- Camera setup: Multi-camera
- Running time: Varies by episode
- Production companies: iQiyi; 稻草熊影业

Original release
- Network: iQiyi
- Release: January 9 – February 15, 2021

The World of Fantasy (simplified Chinese: 灵域; traditional Chinese: 靈域; pinyin: líng yù) is a 2021 Chinese streaming television series that premiered on iQiyi on January 9, 2021. It tells the story of A young man named Qin Lie possessing the Soul Suppressing Orb which held great secrets and unlocked his limitless potential. After countless close calls and many tense encounters, Qin Lie finally discovered the long hidden truth about his past.

It is directed by Liang Guoguan and Jones and features an ensemble cast that includes Adam Fan, Cheng Xiao, Liu Yitong, and Nie Zihao.

The series was adapted from Ni Cang Tian's web fiction Spiritual Realm(灵域). 36 episodes are in Hindi also globally available on iq.com.

== Synopsis ==
The amnesia boy Qin Lie (played by Adam Fan) is involved in a conspiracy due to an accident. After experiencing all kinds of hardships, together with his childhood sweetheart Ling Yushi (played by Cheng Xiao) and other friends, he gradually grows up in the spiritual realm and experiences the new journey. On their way to find the truth about their life experience and pursue higher strength, this group of passionate young people, continue to meet life mentors and friends to protect the spiritual continent together.

== Main cast ==
- Adam Fan as Qin Lie/Gong Mulie
- Cheng Xiao as Ling Yushi/Wuchun
- Liu Yitong as Song Tingyu/Yexian'er
- Nie Zihao as Du Shaoyang
- Ma Yue as Xie Jingxuan/Tang Siqi
