= Lin Yanjun =

Taiwanese singer and actor (born 1995)

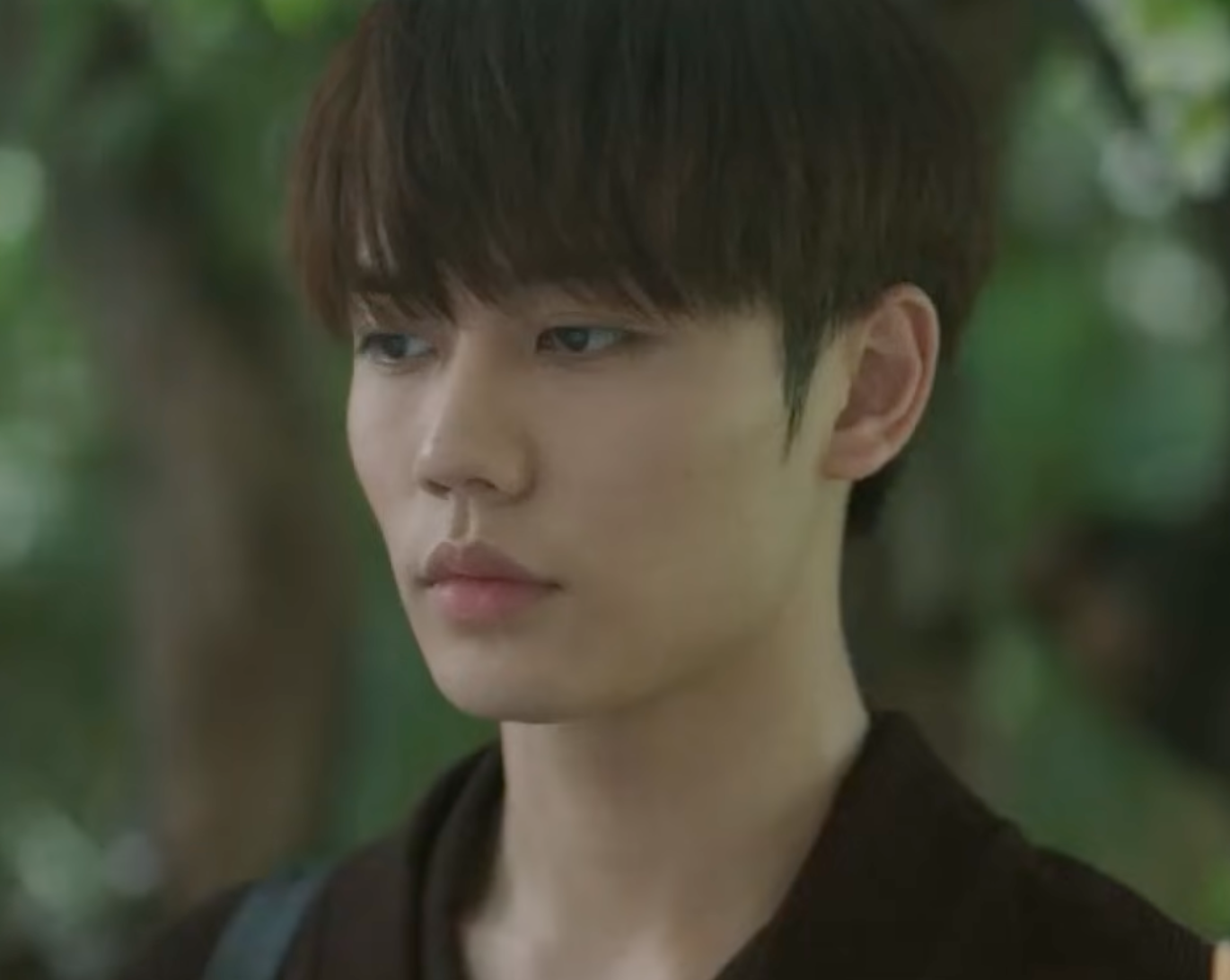
- Lin as Su Nian Qin in the 2021 drama Crush
- Born: August 24, 1995 (age 30); Haikou, Hainan, China
- Education: Guangdong University of Foreign Studies
- Occupations: Singer; Rapper; Actor
- Musical career
- Genres: C-pop
- Instruments: Vocals; Piano
- Years active: 2018–present
- Label: Banana Culture

Chinese name
- Traditional Chinese: 林彥俊
- Simplified Chinese: 林彦俊
Transcriptions
Standard Mandarin
- Hanyu Pinyin: Lín Yànjùn
- Bopomofo: ㄌㄧㄣˊ ㄧㄢˋ ㄐㄩㄣˋ
- Wade–Giles: Lin Yen-chün

Lin Yanjun (Chinese: 林彦俊; born August 24, 1995), also known as Evan Lin, is a Taiwanese singer, rapper and actor. He debuted as a member of temporary Chinese boy group Nine Percent on April 6, 2018, through Chinese survival show Idol Producer. He is best known for his role as Su Nan Qin in the drama Crush adapted from the popular novel written by Mu Fusheng.

== Early life ==
Lin was born on August 24, 1995, in Haikou, Hainan and because of his parents' work, he grew up moving between Taiwan, Jiangxi, and Guangdong. He passed the Hong Kong, Macau and Taiwan student entrance examination and entered Guangdong University of Foreign Studies. His father is from Taiwan and his mother is from Jiangxi. After finishing his freshman year, he chose to suspend his school and return to Taiwan to complete his military service. He can speak Mandarin, Cantonese, Minnan, Korean and English. He has a younger sister.

At the age of 18, he was invited by JYP Entertainment to become a trainee but declined as he wanted to focus on his studies and military duties. In 2016, he signed a contract with a Taiwanese brokerage company, but as he did not get the training promised when signing the contract, he and the other members held a press conference at the door of the company to complain. After that he passed the Shanghai Banana Entertainment global trainee audition, signed a contract with Banana Entertainment and officially became a Banana Entertainment trainee.

== Career ==
=== 2018: Idol Producer and Nine Percent ===
Lin was a member of trainee group Trainee18 under his label Shanghai Project Banana Co. On January 22, 2018, he released the trainee graduation single "Rock The Show" with Trainee18. He then participated in the idol survival show Idol Producer in January 2018. He ranked fifth in the final episode with 12,131,367 votes and debuted as a member of temporary Chinese boy group Nine Percent on April 6, 2018.

Nine Percent released their debut album 'To The Nines' on November 12, 2018, with 7 tracks. Before the group's disbandment on October 6, 2019, Nine Percent released their second album 'More Than Forever' on September 26, 2019 where Lin Yanjun has a solo song "Like A Star".

=== 2019–present: solo career and acting career ===
- Soon after his debut, Lin released his first trap single "YOU" on August 24, 2018. Then on August 29, 2018, Lin's studio was officially formed. On January 7, 2019, Lin released his first solo music EP Imperfect Love (剛好的傷口) with two songs. It earned 5 million yuan within 28 seconds of release, breaking 6 sales records on QQ Music. The music video was released on February 19, 2019.
- On March 25, 2019, he won the Best New Singer Award in Hong Kong and Taiwan at the 26th ERC Chinese Top Ten Music Festival, additionally his EP "Imperfect Love" won the Most Popular EP Award in Hong Kong and Taiwan. The single has also reached No.4 on Billboard China Social Music Chart on March 3, 2019.

In Nine Percent's first debut anniversary, April 6, 2019, he released image teasers for his second personal music EP "Escape". The album was released on April 12, 2019 and is comprised two songs. Lin wrote the lyrics for the title track "Get Outta My Head" and composed the melody for "Over You". He performed both songs live at his EP launch fan-meetings in Guangzhou and Chengdu later that month.

- On August 24, 2019 he released his new single "Competitor" (对手). The music video was released on August 30, 2019, on QQ Music and YouTube and became the third music video to accumulate 50 million points on the QQ Music MV Peak Chart on October 3, 2019. Prior to the release, he released two part documentary on his Weibo account, which was then shared on Sony Music Taiwan's official YouTube channel.
- On April 16, 2020, he released his new single "You Are So Beautiful", with a staggering 900 million views in just mainland China, but creating a ripple across many other South East Asia countries. Then on October 13, 2020, he released a collaboration with Doja Cat of her hit song "Say So" for a Chinese version remix.
- On June 13, 2020, Lin attended the filming ceremony of his first drama 一见倾心 / Fall In Love in which he stars as Xu GuangYao. He also attended the filming ceremony of his second drama 原来我很爱你 / Crush on September 14, 2020. He stars as the visually impaired Su NianQin, who is also the mysterious songwriter Yi Jin. This is his first drama as the main male lead.
- On August 24, 2020, the day of his birthday, he announced his new EP will be releasing soon, and released a short teaser clip with excerpt of his new song. The song titled "Waiting for the Whole Winter" (等待整個冬天) from his EP "1995" was released on October 27. However, the song had to be taken down after few hours of release for re-producing because three lines of the lyrics were found to be highly similar to an existing song. "Waiting for the Whole Winter" was jointly composed by him and few of his friends before Lin debuted in 2018. Lin was not involved in the writing of the lyrics in question.

== Filmography ==
=== Dramas ===
Year	English title	Chinese title	Role	Notes
2021	Fall in Love	一见倾心	Xu Guang Yao	
2021	Crush	原来我很爱你	Su Nian Qin	Main lead

=== Television shows appearance ===
Year	Title	English title	Network	Notes
2017	天生是優我	Born U5	Zhejiang Television	Pre-Debut
2018	偶像练习生	Idol Producer	iQiyi	Contestant; Finished fifth
2018	花路之旅	Flower Road Journey	iQiyi	Cast Member Nine Percent Variety Show
2018	快乐大本营	Happy Camp	Hunan Television	Guest
2018	奔跑吧兄弟	Keep Running	Zhejiang Television	Guest
2018	中国音乐公告牌	Idol Hits	iQiyi	Guest
2018	咕噔咕噔Banana	Guten Guten Banana	iQiyi	Cast Member
2018	小姐姐的花店	Sister's Flower Shop	iQiyi	Cast Member
2018	野生廚房	Wild Kitchen	Hunan Television	Cast Member
2019	快乐大本营	Happy Camp	Hunan Television	Guest
2019	天天向上	Day Day Up	Hunan Television	Guest
2019	我们的演唱会	Our Concert	iQiyi	Cast Member
2019	限定的记忆	More Than Forever	iQiyi	Nine Percent's Final Documentary
2020	野生廚房2	Wild Kitchen 2	Hunan Television	Special Appearance
2020	快乐大本营	Happy Camp	Hunan Television	Guest

== Discography ==
=== EPs ===
Title	Album details	Sales
刚好的伤口 (Imperfect Love)	Released: January 7, 2019; Language: Mandarin; Label: 永稻星娱乐; Track listing: 1. "刚好的伤口 (Imperfect Love)"; 2. "You"	CHN: 2,389,571
Escape	Released: April 12, 2019; Language: Mandarin; Label: 永稻星娱乐; Track listing: 1. "Get Outta My Head (Prod. GenNeo梁根荣)"; 2. "Over you (Prod. 623)"	CHN: 1,209,556

=== Singles ===
Title	Year	Peak chart positions	Sales	Album
Title	Year	CHN	Sales	Album
"You"	2018	14	—N/a	刚好的伤口 (Imperfect Love)
"刚好的伤口" (Imperfect Love)	2019	3	—N/a	刚好的伤口 (Imperfect Love)
"Get Outta My Head"	2019	6	—N/a	Escape
"对手" (Competitor)	2019	4	CHN: 2,096,869	Non-album Single
"You Are So Beautiful"	2020	5	—N/a	Non-album Single
"休息之道" (Turn Off)	2021	16	—N/a	Non-album Single
"在飞翔与迷失之间" (Lost)	2021	36	—N/a	Non-album Single
"别待了" (Stay No More)	2022	5	—N/a	Non-album Single
"爱情从遗忘开始" (Love Starts from Oblivion)	2022	55	—N/a	Non-album Single

=== Soundtrack appearance ===
Title	Year	Peak chart positions	Album
Title	Year	CHN	Album
"最好的安排" (The Best Arrangement)	2020	5	Love Designer OST
"盛夏" (Midsummer) (with Xue Mingyuan)	2020	27	Love Designer OST
"Meeting You" (with Wan Peng)	2021	—	Crush OST
"Forever Shine For Me"	2021	—	Crush OST

=== Other charted singles ===
Title	Year	Peak chart positions	Album	Notes
Title	Year	CHN	Album	Notes
"Over you"	2019	19	Escape	
"Like a Star"	2019	17	限定的记忆 (More Than Forever)	(Note: "限定的记忆 (More Than Forever)" is an album by the Chinese boy group Nine Percent.)

=== Collaborations ===
Title	Year	Album
"Say So" (with Doja Cat)	2020	Non-album Single

== Awards and nominations ==
Year	Name	Award	Work	Result	Ref
2019	第26屆東方風雲榜音樂盛典 The 26th Oriental Fengyun Music Festival	Best New Singer (Taiwan)	—N/a	Won	
2019	第26屆東方風雲榜音樂盛典 The 26th Oriental Fengyun Music Festival	Most Popular EP	刚好的伤口 (Imperfect Love)	Won	
2020	QQ Music "Boom Boom Awards"	Youth Star Of The Year	—N/a	Won	
2020	Sohu Fashion Awards	Popular Star Of The Year	—N/a	Nominated	

== Endorsements and ambassadorship ==
In 2018, Lin was chosen to endorse the cosmetics brands Elizabeth Arden and Panasonic Beauty as well as being the ambassador for multiple Korean brands such as Innisfree and MISSHA. Lin was also given the opportunity to be the spokesperson for both Philosophy and skincare line Martiderm.

In 2019, Lin was chosen to present the full line of YSL Beauty as well as the Korean make-up brand 3CE. He was also chosen to become the ambassador of multiple brands, including Longchamp, LANVIN, Schwepps, CLEAR and Mirinda. He also became China's first ambassador for the brand Superga.

In 2020, Lin was chosen as a brand ambassador for Clé de Peau Beauté and Descente.
