= Fan Chengcheng =

Chinese singer (born 2000)

- 范丞丞
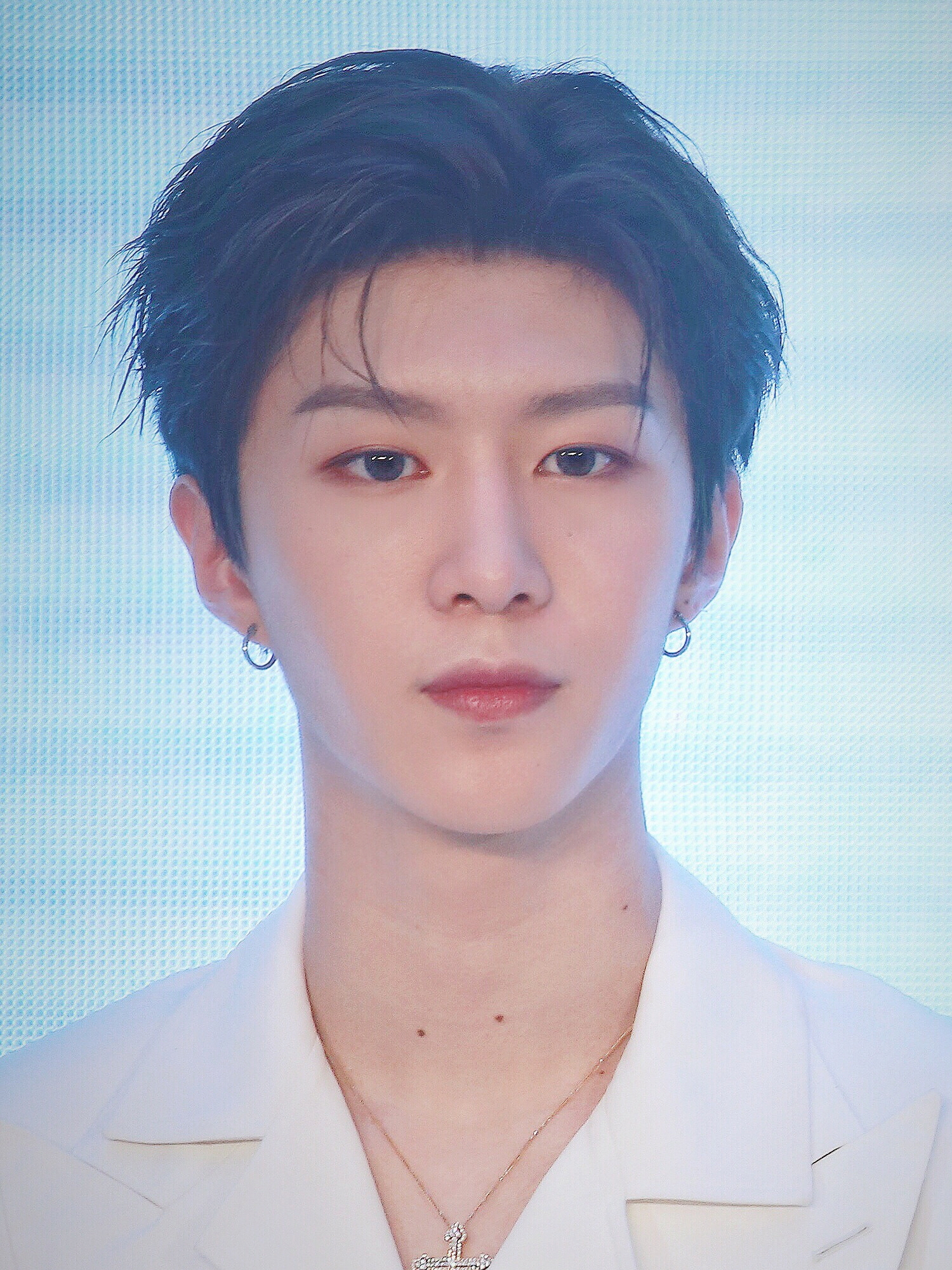
- Fan in 2018
- Born: 16 June 2000 (age 26); Qingdao, Shandong, China
- Other name: Adam
- Occupations: Singer; rapper; actor
- Relatives: Fan Bingbing (sister)
- Musical career
- Genre: Mandopop
- Years active: 2017–present
- Label: Fan Chengcheng Studio

Fan Chengcheng
- Chinese: 范丞丞
Transcriptions
Standard Mandarin
- Hanyu Pinyin: Fàn Chéngchéng

Fan Chengcheng (Chinese: 范丞丞; born 16 June 2000) is a Chinese singer, rapper and actor. He is a former member of the Chinese boy group Nine Percent and also a member of boy group Next. He has been a cast member of the Chinese variety show Keep Running since 2023.

== Early life ==
Fan Chengcheng was born in Qingdao, Shandong, and is the younger brother of Fan Bingbing. Fan Chengcheng attended Beijing Huijia Private School from a young age. At 15, he began to study at the Royal Russell School in the United Kingdom, and later transferred to Montverde Academy in the United States. In November 2016, he went to South Korea, and joined Yuehua Entertainment as a trainee after passing an audition.

== Career ==
Fan Chengcheng participated in the Chinese boy band survival program Idol Producer aired from 19 January to 6 April 2018. He eventually placed 3rd in the final episode and debuted as a member of Nine Percent.

While promoting with Nine Percent, before disbandment, Fan debuted as a member of Yuehua's new boy band NEX7 with the song "Wait a Minute" on 21 June 2018. On 23 June 2018, NEX7 held their first fan meeting in Beijing, China. Fan released his first digital single, titled "I'm Here" on 22 November 2018, and "Dumb Show" in December. On 18 December, he was awarded the "New Power Artist of the Year" in the 10th Beijing News China Fashion Power List. On 4 May 2019, he served as a resident guest of Zhejiang Television's Youth Periplous Season. He released his debut EP on 16 June, with "Like A Fan" serving as the title track.

Fan was also cast in several variety shows such as Chase Me in 2019, as a series regular. Chase Me was swiftly cancelled after only 3 episodes, following the death of guest star Godfrey Gao. On 31 July 2020, he joined the second season of The Man Doing Housework; on 22 October, he joined the guest lineup of Trend partner 2. On 3 March 2021, French luxury brand Givenchy announced that singer and actor Fan Chengcheng became its brand spokesperson. On 15 October 2021, he participated in the Beautiful and Wonderful Night of Douyin. He was also cast in his first television series, Spirit Realm alongside Cheng Xiao.

From 2018 to 2020, he participated in Zhejiang Television's New Year's Eve Concert for three consecutive years. On 17 October 2019, Fan Chengcheng was included in the 2019 Forbes China 30 Under 30 Elite List.

== Personal life ==
Fan is the younger brother of Chinese actress Fan Bingbing, who is almost 19 years his senior. He was an active idol throughout her disappearance and presumed arrest in 2018.

== Discography ==
=== Extended plays ===
Title	Album details	Sales	Ref.
Like A Fan	Released: 16 June 2019; Language: Mandarin; Label: Yuehua Entertainment; Track listing: 1. "Dip Out"; 2. "Finesse"; 3. "Straight"	1,043,106	
EMERGING	Released: 16 June 2020; Language: Mandarin; Label: Yuehua Entertainment; Track listing: 1. "困兽"; 2. "Missed Texts"; 3. "2 Minds"; 4. "过度呼吸"	679,080	
咦？	Released: 16 June 2021; Language: Mandarin; Label: Yuehua Entertainment; Track listing: 1. "Born to Lose"; 2. "MAD!"; 3. "2"; 4. "Proud of Myself"	1,154,060	

=== Singles ===
Title	Year	Peak chart positions	Sales	Album
Title	Year	CHN (Note: The China TME UNI Chart was launched by Tencent Music in 2018 and first published by Billboard in November 2022.)	Sales	Album
"I'm Here"	2018	—N/a	CHN: 2,800,685	Non-album single
"哑剧 (Dumb Show)"	2018	—N/a	—N/a	Non-album single
"Hi Wake Up"	2019	14	—N/a	青春的花路
"Dip Out"	2019	—	—N/a	Like A Fan
"Let Go"	2019	—	—N/a	青春的花路
"Umbrella"	2019	22	—N/a	More Than Forever (限定的记忆) (Note: More Than Forever (限定的记忆) is an album by Nine Percent)
"快乐很简单 (Happiness is Simple)" (Note: For iQiyi Scream Night)	2020	—	—N/a	Non-album single
"Can't Slow Down"	2020	8	—N/a	Non-album single
"秘密 (Secret)"	2021	—	—N/a	秘密 (Secret)
"从第一天开始 (We Don't Play)"	2023	—	—N/a	从第一天开始 (We Don't Play)
"—" denotes releases that did not chart or were not released in that region.

=== Soundtrack appearances ===
Title	Year	Peak chart positions	Album
Title	Year	CHN	Album
"醉墨"	2021	—	The World of Fantasy OST
"—" denotes releases that did not chart or were not released in that region.

=== Collaborations ===
Title	Year	Peak chart positions	Album
Title	Year	CHN	Album
"Rock With Me" Danko (弹壳) Feat. Fan Chengcheng (范丞丞)	2021	39	Non-album single
"—" denotes releases that did not chart or were not released in that region.

== Filmography ==
=== Film ===
Year	English title	Chinese title	Role	Ref.
2021	Door lock	门锁	Xiao Wu	
2026	Traces of Justice	神探之痕迹	Qi Xiaolong	
TBA	Fireflies in the Sun	扫黑·拨云见日	Tu Di	
TBA	To Be Continued	了不起的夜晚		
TBA		人生路不熟		

=== Television series ===
Year	English title	Chinese title	Role	Ref.
2021	The World of Fantasy	灵域	Qin Lie	
2021	Wisher	致命愿望	Qiu Wendong	
2022	Time Seems to Have Forgotten	被遗忘的时光	Lu Xiaofan	
2023	Once and Forever	曾少年	Yang Cheng	
2024	Love Endures	要久久爱	Jiang Yi	
2024	Romance in the Alley	小巷人家	Zhuang Tunan	
TBA	The Queen of Brilliance	璀璨之上	Gao Haicheng	
TBA	Chasing the Light	左肩有你	Jiang Cheng	

=== Variety shows ===
Year	Title	Original title	Network	Note(s)	Ref.
2018	Idol Producer	偶像练习生	iQiyi	Contestant; Finished 3rd	
2019	Youth Periplous	青春环游记	Zhejiang	Cast member	
2019	Chase Me	追我吧	Zhejiang	Cast member	
2019	Beautiful Flower Road Journey	青春的花路	iQiyi	Cast member	
2019	Daughter's Boyfriends	女兒們的男朋友	Tencent	Cast member	
2019		美食告白記3	Tencent	Cast member	
2020	I want to live like this	我要这样生活	iQiyi	Cast member	
2020	Youth Periplous 2	青春环游记2	Zhejiang	Cast member	
2020	Mr. Housework 2	做家務的男人2	iQiyi	Cast member	
2020	Fourtry 2	潮流合伙人2	iQiyi	Cast member	
2020	Sisters Who Make Waves	乘风破浪的姐姐	Mango TV	guest performers	
2020	An exciting offer 2	令人心动的offer2	Tencent	Cast member	
2021	The Detectives' Adventures	萌探探探案	iQiyi	Guest	
2021	Ace VS Ace 6	王牌对王牌6	Zhejiang	Guest	
2021	Youth Periplous 3	青春环游记3	Zhejiang	Cast member	
2022	Ace VS Ace 7	王牌对王牌7	Zhejiang	Guest	
2022	Have Fun 2	嗨放派2	iQiyi	Cast member	
2023	Let's go now	现在就出发	Tencent	Cast member	
2023	Natural High	现在就出发	Tencent	Cast Member	
2024	Natural High; Season:2	现在就出发	Tencent	Cast Member	
2025	Natural High; Season:3	现在就出发	Tencent	Cast Member	

== Magazine ==
Year	Published month	Title	Ref.
2018	June	VogueMe	
2018	July	时尚COSMO	
2018	August	时尚先生Esquire	
2018	September	YOHO潮流志	
2018	September	男人风尚Leon Yonug	
2018	October	NeufMode(九号摩登)	
2018	December	伊周	
2019	February	BOBOSNAP	
2019	March	时尚家居	
2019	April	Men's uno young(风度)	
2019	May	男人装	
2019	June	OK!精彩	
2019	August	风度MENSUNO	
2019	November	NYLON尼龙	
2020	April	ELLEMEN新青年	
2020	April	芭莎珠宝	
2020	June	男人装	
2020	June	SuperELLE	
2020	June	MadameFigaro	
2020	July	K!ND	
2020	August	嘉人NOW	
2020	September	时尚芭莎BAZAAR	
2020	September	周末画报	
2021	March	VogueMe	
2021	March	男人风尚Leon Yonug	
2021	June	GQ Style	
