= Benelux Chamber of Commerce =

- Established: 2001
- Type: Non-profit organization
- Headquarters: Chaoyang District, Beijing
- Official languages: English, Chinese, Dutch, French
- Website: www.bencham.org

The Benelux Chamber of Commerce (BenCham) is a business association representing companies from Benelux countries (Belgium, Netherlands, and Luxembourg) operating in China. Established in 2001, it operates under recognition from the embassies of Belgium, the Netherlands, and Luxembourg in China.

== Organization ==
The chamber maintains three regional chapters in Beijing, Shanghai, and Guangzhou. As of 2025, it reported approximately 350 member organizations ranging from multinational corporations to small and medium enterprises. The organization is governed by a board of directors and operates through a secretariat staffed by both Benelux and Chinese personnel. Funding is derived from membership fees, event revenues, and sponsorships.

== Activities ==
The organization conducts business networking events, policy discussions, and professional development seminars. Key initiatives include:

- Business forums addressing trade policy and market entry strategies
- Workshops for small and medium enterprises
- Networking receptions with diplomatic and commercial stakeholders
- Collaborative projects on corporate social responsibility with European partners
- An internship program connecting Benelux students with companies in Shanghai, China

== History ==
The chamber originated from the 2001 merger of the Dutch Business Association and Belgian-Luxembourg Business Association in Shanghai. Regional chapters were subsequently established in Beijing (2005) and Guangzhou (2010s). The organization adopted its current name in 2006.

== Membership ==
Membership is available to:

- Companies headquartered in Benelux countries
- Professionals with educational or commercial ties to Benelux nations
- Students from Benelux universities
