= Next (Chinese group) =

Chinese boy group

NEXT
- Also known as: 乐华七子NEXT
- Origin: Beijing, China
- Genres: C-pop
- Years active: 2018–present
- Labels: Yuehua Entertainment
- Members: Zhu Zhengting; Bi Wenjun; Huang Xinchun; Fan Chengcheng; Justin Huang; Ding Zeren; Li Quanzhe

Next (Chinese: 乐华七子NEXT; pinyin: Yuè Huá Qī Zi NEXT; Korean: 넥스트; stylized as NEXT) is a Chinese boy group signed to Yuehua Entertainment. The group consists of seven members: Zhu Zhengting, Bi Wenjun, Huang Xinchun, Fan Chengcheng, Justin Huang, Ding Zeren, and Li Quanzhe.

The group originally debuted as NEX7 in June 2018 and has released two EPs. In November 2019, the group renamed as NEXT with the release of their third EP Next Begins, in which Fan Chengcheng did not participate.

== History ==
=== Pre-debut ===
In 2017, members Zhu Zhengting and Justin took part in Korea's Produce 101, gaining international attention. In 2018, as Yuehua Entertainment trainees, the septet competed in China's Idol Producer. After three months and 12 episodes, members Zhu Zhengting, Justin, and Fan Chengcheng joined the final project group Nine Percent.

=== 2018: Debut ===
The group debuted on June 21, 2018, with the first part of their debut EP The First and its lead single "Wait a Minute". They continue released more part of their debut EP titled The First II on July 18 followed by The First III on August 17. The group released their second EP Next To You on December 7.

=== 2019: Renamed as NEXT ===
On November 8, 2019, the group continue their activities as NEXT (乐华七子NEXT) while also releasing their third EP, Next Begins.

=== 2020: My Love ===
On September 29, 2020, the group released a new single entitled "My Love". On October 9, an animated music video was released to accompany it.

== Members ==
- Zhu Zhengting (朱正廷)
- Bi Wenjun (毕雯珺)
- Huang Xinchun (黄新淳)
- Fan Chengcheng (范丞丞)
- Justin Huang (黄明昊)
- Ding Zeren (丁泽仁)
- Li Quanzhe (李权哲)

== Discography ==
=== Studio albums ===
Title	Details	Sales
Next To You	Released: December 7, 2018; Language: Mandarin; Label: Yuehua Entertainment; Formats: digital download, streaming; Track listing: 1. "Blah Blah" (丛林法则); 2. "Back to You" (回到你身旁); 3. "Excuses" (借口); 4. "Want U" (你) - 朱正廷单曲; 5. "Dumb Show" (哑剧) - 范丞丞单曲; 6. "After Leaving" (离开以后) - 黄明昊单曲; 7. "Goodnight to You" (晚安) - 毕雯珺单曲; 8. "Open your 爱" - 丁泽仁单曲; 9. "Fly to the Moon" (月行记) - 李权哲单曲; 10. "Once More" (邂逅) - 黄新淳单曲	CHN: 212,768

=== Extended plays ===
Title	Details	Sales
The First	Released: June 21, 2018; Language: Mandarin; Label: Yuehua Entertainment; Formats: digital download, streaming; Track listing: 1. "Wait A Minute (等一下)"; 2. "For You (为你)"	CHN: 863,463
The First II	Released: July 18, 2018; Language: Mandarin; Label: Yuehua Entertainment; Formats: digital download, streaming; Track listing: 1. "Let Me be Your Fire (点火)"; 2. "Heart Full of You (心溢)"; 3. "Dream World Tour" (梦境之旅)	CHN: 394,585
The First III	Released: August 17, 2018; Language: Mandarin; Label: Yuehua Entertainment; Formats: digital download, streaming; Track listing: 1. "Attention (自由主义)"; 2. "On & On (不停)"	CHN: 432,993
Next Begins	Released: November 8, 2019; Language: Mandarin; Label: Yuehua Entertainment; Formats: digital download, streaming; Track listing: 1. "New Order"; 2. "WYTB (What You Talking About)" (不懂你在说什么); 3. "Blooming"; 4. "I Just Need You" (只需要你一个)	CHN: 63,698

=== Singles ===
Title	Year	Album
"Wait A Minute"	2018	The First I
"Let Me Be Your Fire"	2018	The First II
"Attention"	2018	The First III
"Back To You"	2018	Next To You
"WYTB (What You Talkin' Bout)"	2019	Next Begins
"My Love"	2020	Non-album singles

=== Soundtrack appearances ===
Title	Year	OST
"Stay by your Side" (陪在你身旁)	2018	Happy Camp OST
"Together" (在一起)	2018	Legend of the Ancient Sword OST
"少年可期"	2019	Master In The House OST
"Mission No. 1" (头号任务)	2019	Top Task OST
