= Justin Huang (singer) =

Chinese singer (born 2002)

- 黄明昊
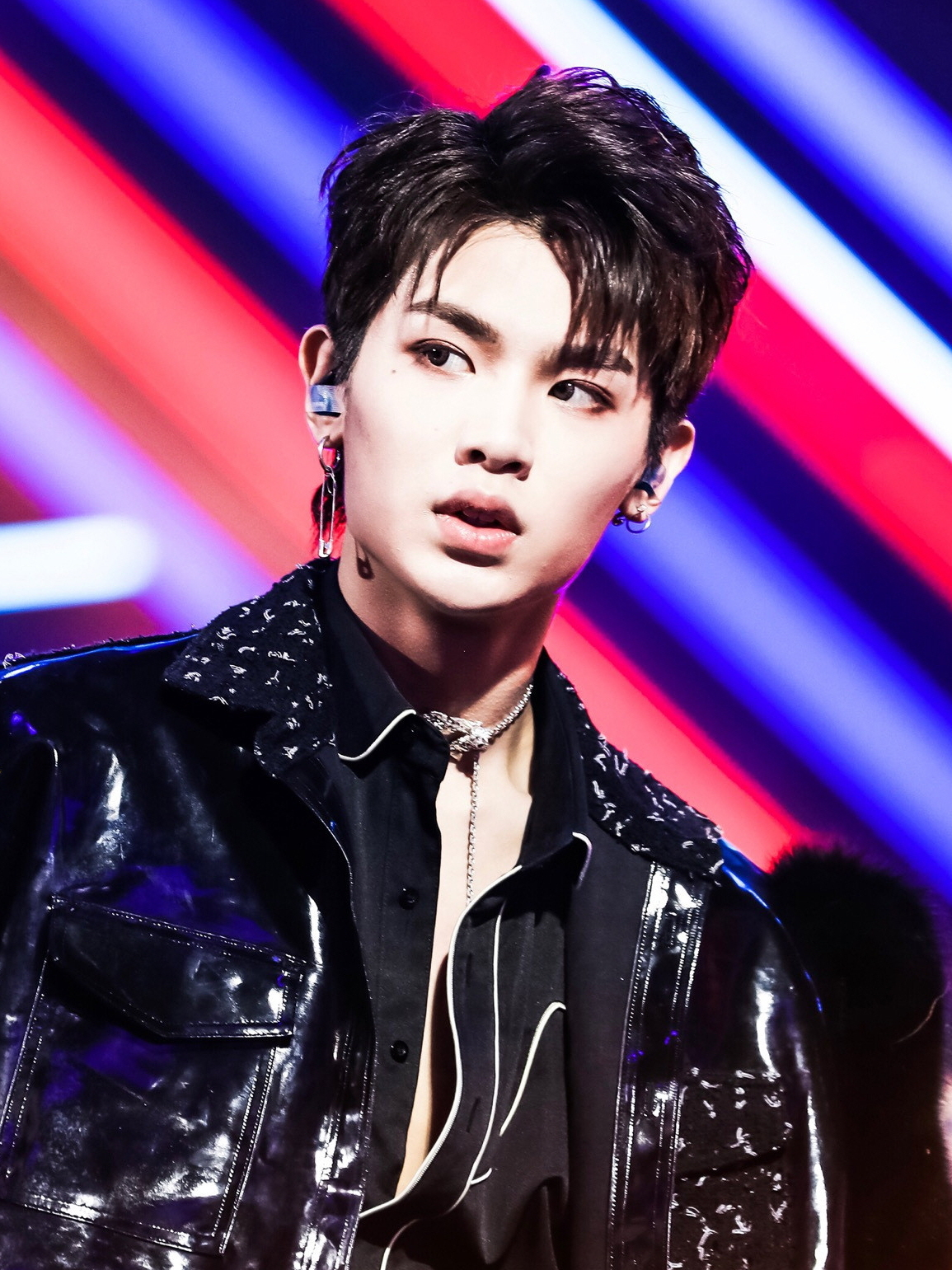
- Huang in 2018
- Born: Huang Minghao; February 19, 2002 (age 24); Wenzhou, Zhejiang, China
- Other names: Justin Huang
- Occupations: Singer; Rapper; Dancer; Actor; Host
- Height: 184 cm (6 ft 0 in)
- Musical career
- Genres: C-pop; Hip hop
- Instrument: Vocals
- Years active: 2017–present
- Label: YH Entertainment
- Member of: Next
- Formerly of: Nine Percent

Huang Minghao
- Traditional Chinese: 黃明昊
- Simplified Chinese: 黄明昊
Transcriptions
Standard Mandarin
- Hanyu Pinyin: Huáng Mínghào

Huang Minghao (Chinese: 黄明昊, born February 19, 2002), also known as Justin Huang, is a Chinese singer, dancer, rapper, actor, and host. He was a member of project group Nine Percent from April 6, 2018, until the group's disbandment on October 6, 2019. He is currently a member of YH Entertainment's Next.

Since his debut, he has released two albums and multiple singles. He has won the Best Singer at the Asian Music Festival and has been named in the top 30 music pioneer list Annual Pioneer Singer and Composer Rookie at the Glory Ceremony. Since 2018, he has been on the stage of CCTV New Year's Eve Gala and Spring Festival Gala, served as the torchbearer of the 2022 Beijing Winter Olympics, and has also become the well-deserved darling of variety shows such as Extreme Challenge, Great Escape, Big Brother Energetic, Meet the Temple of Heaven, Summer Surf Shop. He was cast as male lead in the film Reversed Destiny (沙漏).

== Early life ==
Born on 19 February 2002, in Rui'an, Wenzhou, Zhejiang province, Huang lived with his grandparents and attended Hangzhou Jinxiu Middle School before becoming a trainee at Yuehua Entertainment and flying to South Korea at age thirteen to commence training.

== Career ==
=== Pre-debut: Produce 101 and Idol Producer ===
Huang participated in the South Korean boy group survival reality show, Produce 101 which aired on Mnet in 2017. His notable stages include "Replay" and "Shape of You", with him taking the center position on the stage of "Replay". He was eventually eliminated on episode 8 with a total vote of 458,650, an impressive feat considering he was only 15 at the time.

It was later announced in late 2017 that Justin would be joining the Chinese reality boy group survival show, Idol Producer.

=== 2018–present: Debut with Nine Percent, Next and solo activities ===
Following Produce 101, Huang then returned to China to develop his career. He found success after joining Idol Producer, which aired from January 19 to April 6, 2018. His notable performances include Uniq's "EOEO" (performed with his fellow Yuehua trainees), Jackson Wang's "Papillon" and "It's Ok". In the finals, he ranked fourth with 14,574,594 votes and officially debuted as a member of the nine-member boy group Nine Percent.

While promoting with Nine Percent, Huang debuted as a member of YH Entertainment's new boy band Next with the song "Wait a Minute" on June 21, 2018. On June 23, 2018, Huang and other members of Next held their first fan meeting in Beijing, China. On November 5, 2018, Huang released his first solo original single "Hard Road". On December 7, 2018，he released his second solo original song "After Leaving" as part of Next's Next to You album. On April 23, 2019, his third solo original single "Liar" was released. On May 15, 2019, he also teamed up with Japanese rapper KOHH to present a new collaborative single "Maria". That year, Huang won "Best New Songwriter" at the 2018 Asian Music Festival.

In early 2019, Huang joined the cast of Great Escape alongside artists like Yang Mi, Deng Lun, and more. Following the show's success, he has participated in its following seasons, and is the only member to have participated in all its episodes to date. On November 8, 2019, Huang and five other members of Next released the album Next Begins. During the summer, Huang became a coach-in-training in the variety show 24 Seconds of Youth and in the fall, he became part of the cast of Meeting the Temple of Heaven, as well as making appearances on many other reality TV shows.

In 2020, Huang was a fixed member of the variety shows I Want to Open a Shop and The Great Wall, amongst many others. In January 2020, it was announced that he would be joining the cast of 七圣 (Seven Saints), starring as 哪吒 (Nezha), although production of the movie has since stalled. On August 3, 2020, Huang released his first solo album 18, featuring many self-written songs, and held his first solo concert in October. He took part in Romon U Park's 星动一夏 (Starry Summer) festival for the first time that year and has continued his appearance since then.

Huang participated in various performances in 2021, including A Wonderful Night on Douyin and Dream of the East 2022 Dragon TV New Year's Eve. On July 16 that year, he released the solo single "U", of which he had significant songwriting contributions. It ties in with his experience growing up amidst tears and self-doubt. The song saw significant commercial success: 710,000 singles were sold every second with sales exceeding 2.13 million yuan; within a minute, its sales volume exceeded one million.

In 2022, Huang continued his appearances on various reality shows, from familiar ones like Great Escape to joining new shows like 全力以赴的行动派 (All-Out Action) with fellow cast members Dylan Wang, Victor Qin and Hankiz Omar, better known as Hanikezi. On August 25, he released his second album VR with the lead single "Wonderland" and followed up with several music videos for its songs (including "意乱情迷" and "有花期的恋爱"). He was also a torchbearer at the 2022 Beijing Olympics.

Huang went on tour in China in 2023, bringing 贾想世界 演唱会 (Justin's Imaginary World) to fans in various cities. At the same time, he has reprised his role as cast member on shows like Great Escape and All-Out Action (Season 2). On April 29, he took part in the LMF Music Festival. His upcoming performances include Yuehua's Family Concert in July and Romon U Park's 星动一夏 (Starry Summer), marking the third year of his participation in the festival. On July 7, it was officially confirmed that Huang would be starring in the film 沙漏 (Reversed Destiny) as male lead 路理 (Luli), an adaption of the novel of the same name by author 饶雪漫 (Rao Xueman).

== Discography ==
=== Extended plays ===
Title	Album details	Sales
18	Released: August 3, 2020; Language: Mandarin; Track listing: 1. "Angel Love"; 2. "PSYCHO"; 3. "熬鷹戰隊"; 4. "Blue"; 5. "當一切變成空白"; 6. "我是說如果"; 7. "Lose Your Mind"; 8. "一反常態"; 9. "FM520"; 10. "幻想者"	CHN: 831,758
VR	Released: August 25, 2022; Language: Mandarin; Track listing: 1. "Wonderland"; 2. "危险派对"; 3. "意乱情迷"; 4. "梦境环游(feat.阿达娃)" 5. "Shawty(feat.Capper)"; 6. "别再骂我了"; 7. "有花期的恋爱"; 8. "PRAY"; 9. "HAKUNA MATATA"	CHN: 221,246

=== Singles ===
Title	Year	Peak chart positions	Sales	Album
Title	Year	CHN	Sales	Album
"Hard Road"	2018	—	CHN: 2,795,983	Non-album single
"After Leaving"	2018	—	CHN: 249,000+	NEXT TO YOU (Note: NEXT TO YOU is an album by NEXT)
"Liar"	2019	—	CHN: 1,236,014	Non-album single
"1/2 Sweet"	2019	—	—N/a	Non-album single
"温州Freestyle (Wenzhou Freestyle)"	2019	—	—N/a	Non-album single
"1/2 Cool"	2019	—	—N/a	Non-album single
"Unstoppable Passion"	2019	—	—N/a	Non-album single
"Pick Up the Phone"	2019	—	—N/a	Non-album single
"请拨打我的电话please (Call me, please)"	2019	—	CHN: 132,048	Non-album single
"挣脱 (Struggle Free)"	2020	44	—N/a	More Than Forever (限定的记忆) (Note: More Than Forever is an album by NINE PERCENT)
"Angel Love"	2020	—	—N/a	18
"U"	2021	11	CHN: 1,701,816	Non-album single
"星之远征"	2022	80	—N/a	Non-album single
"Wonderland"	2022	25	—N/a	VR
"—" denotes releases that did not chart or were not released in that region.

=== Collaborations ===
Title	Year	Peak chart positions	Albums
Title	Year	CHN	Albums
"No Why" With Tia Ray and Ice	2019	—	Non-album single
"Maria" With Kohh	2019	—	Non-album single
"眠冬" With 黄明昊 (Man Shuke)	2020	4	Non-album single
"—" denotes releases that did not chart or were not released in that region.

=== Soundtrack appearances ===
Title	Year	Peak chart positions	Album
Title	Year	CHN	Album
"神奇的汉字"	2019	—	《神奇的汉字 (Magical Chinese Characters)》OST
"Don't Wait Any More" With Meng Meiqi	2019	—	《舞出我人生之舞所不能 (Step Up: Year Of The Dance)》OST
"密室大逃脱" With Yang Mi, Deng Lun, Wowkie Zhang, and Guo Qilin	2020	33	《密室大逃脱 (Great Escape)》OST
"理想" With Roy Wang, 王铮亮 (Reno Wang), Na Ying, Yisa Yu, Zhou Shen, Bibi Zhou, Han Lei, Lai Meiyun, and 魏巡 (Wei Xun)	2021	71	《理想照耀中国 (Faith Makes Great)》OST
"—" denotes releases that did not chart or were not released in that region.

== Filmography ==
=== Film ===
Year	English title	Chinese title	Role	Notes
2021	B for Busy	爱情神话	Bai Ge	
2021	Seven Saints	七圣	Nezha	
2023	Reversed Destiny	沙漏	Lu Li	

=== Television shows ===
Year	Title	Original title	Network	Note(s)	Ref
2017	Produce 101	프로듀스 101 시즌 2	Mnet	Contestant; Eliminated on episode 8	
2018	Idol Producer	偶像练习生	iQiyi	Contestant; Finished 4th	
2018	Brave World	勇敢的世界	Mango TV	Cast member	
2018	Fantasy Restaurant	奇妙的食光	iQiyi	Cast member, away for episodes 5-6	
2018	Perfect Restaurant	完美的餐厅	Youku	Cast member	
2019	Master in the House	少年可期	Mango TV	Cast member	
2019	Great Escape	密室大逃脱	Mango TV	Cast member	
2019	24 Seconds of Youth	篮板青春	Tencent Video	Cast member	
2019	Meeting the Temple of Heaven	遇见天坛	Mango TV	Cast member	
2019	I Want to Open a Shop	我想开个店	Jiangsu Television	Cast member	
2019	The Great Wall	了不起的长城	Beijing Satellite TV	Cast member	
2020	Not A Loner	看我的生活	Youku	Cast member	
2020	Great Escape, Season 2	密室大逃脱2	Mango TV	Cast member	
2020	The Irresistible	元气满满的哥哥	Hunan TV	Cast member	
2020	Summer Surf Shop	夏日冲浪店	iQiyi	Cast member	
2020	Who's the Murderer? Season 5	明星大侦探5	Mango TV	Cast member	
2020	Happy Camp	快乐大本营	Hunan TV	Cast member	
2021	Great Escape, Season 3	密室大逃脱3	Mango TV	Cast member	
2021	Who's the Murderer? Season 6	明星大侦探6	Mango TV	Cast member	
2021	Go Fighting! Season 7	极限挑战7	Dragon TV	Cast member	
2022	Great Escape, Season 4	密室大逃脱4	Mango TV	Cast member	
2022	Who's the Murderer? Season 7	明星大侦探7	Mango TV	Guest member on episodes 6 and 8	
2022	Hello, Saturday	你好星期六	Hunan TV	Guest member on episodes 11 and 35, regular member from episodes 39-45	
2022	Let's Go Skiing	超有趣滑雪大会	iQiyi	Cast member	
2022	Ace vs Ace Season 7	王牌对王牌 第七季	Zhejiang TV	Cast member	
2022	Wang Pai Shao Nian Jia Zai Zhong Season 2	王牌少年加载中	Zhejiang TV	Guest member on episode 5	
2022	We Are The Champions	战至巅峰	Tencent Video	Cast member	
2022	Go Fighting! Season 8	极限挑战8	Dragon TV	Cast member	
2022	All-Out Action	全力以赴的行动派	抖音	Cast member	
2023	Hello, Saturday	你好星期六	Hunan TV	Cast member from episodes 1-7	
2023	Treasure Tour Season 3	极限挑战宝藏行 第三季	Dragon TV	Guest member on episodes 1 and 2	
2023	Who's the Murderer? Season 8	明星大侦探8	Mango TV	Guest member on episode 9	
2023	Go Fighting! Season 9	极限挑战9	Dragon TV	Cast member	
2023	Great Escape, Season 5	密室大逃脱5	Mango TV	Cast member	
2023	All-Out Action Season 2	全力以赴的行动派2	抖音	Cast member	

== Magazine ==
Year	Published month	Title	Ref.
2018	October	OK！精彩	
2019	May	Nylon 尼龙	
2019	July	YOHO！潮流志	
2019	July	时尚芭莎	
2019	August	小资风尚CHIC	
2019	October	Madame Figaro Mode	
2019	December	风度men's uno	
2020	February	NeufMode九号摩登	
2021	February	OK！精彩	
2021	March	Style	
2021	June	时尚健康	
2022	May	Nylon 尼龙	
2022	August	K!ND	
2022	October	风度men's uno	

== Awards and nominations ==
Year	Event	Category	Nominated work	Result	Ref.
2018	2018 Asian Music Festival	Best New Song-Writer Award	—N/a	Won	
