= Wang Ziyi =

Chinese musical artist (born 1996)

- Born: Wang Ziyi; July 13, 1996 (age 29); Shanxi, China
- Occupations: Singer; rapper
- Years active: 2018–present
- Musical career
- Genres: C-pop
- Instrument: Vocals
- Years active: 2018–present
- Label: Simply Joy Music
- Member of: BBT
- Formerly of: Nine Percent

Wang Ziyi (Chinese: 王子异; born July 13, 1996), also known as Boogie, is a Chinese rapper, dancer and singer. He is a member of C-pop boy group BBT and former member of Chinese boy group Nine Percent. He is known for his participation as a trainee under Simply Joy Music in the idol survival show Idol Producer, where he finished in seventh place overall and thus became a member of Nine Percent. The group achieved huge success in China and was scheduled to promote for 18 months. After the group held their final farewell concert on October 12, 2019, in Guangzhou, Wang continued on his career as a solo artist.

== Career ==
=== 2017: Before joining Idol Producer ===
Wang debuted as part of boy band BBT on June 17, 2017, prior to participating in Idol Producer. He is still a member of BBT as of recent times, although being mainly active as a solo artist nowadays.

=== 2018-2019: Debut with Nine Percent and disbandment ===
Wang, along with members of BBT and other trainees from Simply Joy Music, represented the company in iQiyi's new Chinese survival reality show, Idol Producer. Trainees who were in the Top 9 in the final episode would debut as part of temporary Chinese boy group Nine Percent. The group was set to promote for 18 months before disbanding. Wang eventually placed seventh in its final episode and thus debuted as a member of Nine Percent.

After debuting with Nine Percent, Wang took part in Chinese dance competition show Shake It Up along with other celebrities.

Nine Percent released two studio albums, "To the Nines" and "More Than Forever (限定的记忆)", before disbanding on October 6, 2019. On October 12, 2019, Nine Percent held their final farewell concert in Guangzhou, China.

=== 2018-present: Debut as solo artist ===
On July 13, 2018, Wang made his debut as a solo artist under his stage name Boogie, releasing his first single, "AMH", which placed 11th in the Billboard charts in China. Wang then released his second single titled, "6AM" on December 19, 2018.

On May 31, 2021, Wang was revealed to have lost his a lawsuit against his label, Simply Joy Music. The lawsuit was filed on grounds that his label had defaulted on various contractual terms. However, his contract termination attempt was ruled as invalid by the Beijing Chaoyang District Court.

Wang has since revealed his intention appeal against the decision in a separate court.

== Filmography ==
=== Television series ===
Year	English title	Chinese title	Role	Notes	Ref.
2020	iPartment 5	爱情公寓5		Cameo	
2020	We Are All Alone	怪你过分美丽	Xu Ling	iQIYI	
2022	Why Women Love	不会恋爱的我们	Gu Jia Xin	Youku	
TBA	The Ingenious One	云襄传			
TBA	Hello, My Love	芳心荡漾			
TBA	Hello Beautiful Life	心想事成	Yu Fei		

=== Television shows ===
Year	English Title	Chinese Title	Network	Notes
2018	Idol Producer	偶像练习生	iQiyi	Finished 7th
2018	Shake It Up	新舞林大会	Dragon Television	Contestant
2018	Perfect Restaurant	完美的餐厅	Youku	Cast member
2019	Beautiful Youth	青春的花路	iQiyi	Cast member
2019	Love Timing	喜欢你, 我也是	iQiyi	Cast member
2020	Go Newbies	新手驾到	Hunan TV	Cast member
2021–2022	Wow Nice Figure 3	哎呀好身材3	Mango TV	Cast member
2022	Camping Life	一起露营吧	iQiyi	Cast member

== Discography ==
=== Singles ===
Title	Year	Peak chart position	Sales	Album
Title	Year	CHN	Sales	Album
"AMH"	2018	—	CHN: 403,000+	Non-album singles
"6AM"	2018	6	—N/a	Non-album singles
"Overdrive"	2019	47	—N/a	Non-album singles
"Lovelab"	2019	31	—N/a	Non-album singles
"Sea" (海)	2019	33	—N/a	Non-album singles
"Lost" (掉了)	2020	—	—N/a	Non-album singles
"Yessir"	2020	—	—N/a	Non-album singles
"99"	2020	—	—N/a	Non-album singles
"First Sight"	2020	—	—N/a	Non-album singles
"Come Here"	2020	—	—N/a	Non-album singles
"Wow"	2022	—	—N/a	Non-album singles
"Hidden Energy" (热的烫)	2022	—	—N/a	Non-album singles
"Tipsy" (微醺)	2023	—	—N/a	Non-album singles
"—" denotes releases that did not chart or were not released in that region.

=== Soundtrack appearances ===
Title	Year	Peak chart position	Album
Title	Year	CHN	Album
"Bright Summer" (灿烂之夏)	2019	87	A little Reunion OST
"Take a risk with me" (陪我冒险)	2019	88	Minuscule: Mandibles From Far Away OST
"Born Fearless" (生而无畏)	2019	—	S.W.A.T OST
"Youth Map" (with After Journey)	2019	—	Beautiful Youth OST
"—" denotes releases that did not chart or were not released in that region.

=== Collaborations ===
Title	Year	Peak chart position	Album
Title	Year	CHN	Album
"Look at me" (看你看我) (with Zhou Jieqiong)	2019	—	Non-album singles
"D.N.A Cypher I" (with D.N.A, Lay, and Shan Yichun)	2023	20	Non-album singles
"Racks On Me" (with D.N.A, Lay, and Danko)	2023	—	Non-album singles
"No Reason" (with D.N.A and Anders)	2023	—	Non-album singles
"—" denotes releases that did not chart or were not released in that region.

== Awards and nominations ==
Year	Award	Category	Nominated work	Results	Ref.
2019	Sina Fashion Awards	Fashion Attitude Artist of the Year	Himself	Won	
2019	iFeng Fashion Choice Awards	Trend Figure of the Year	Himself	Won	
