= Lil Ghost (singer) =

Chinese singer-songwriter (born 1999)

Wang Linkai
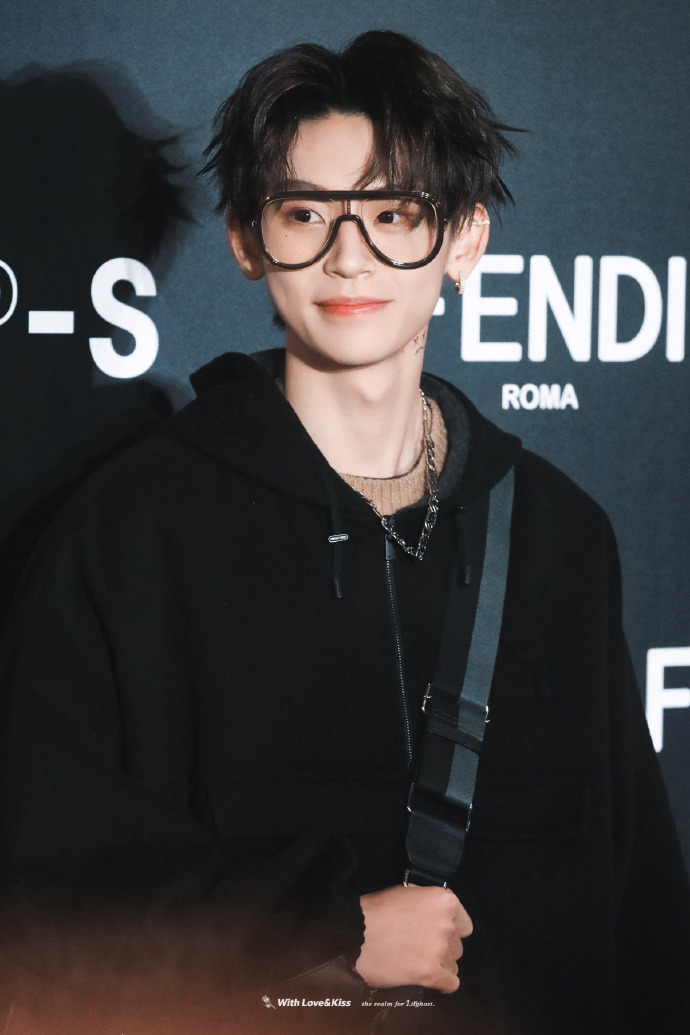
- Wang in 2019
- Born: 20 May 1999 (age 27); Yantai, Shandong, China
- Other names: Xiao Gui; Lil Ghost; Imp
- Occupations: Singer-songwriter; rapper
- Musical career
- Genres: C-pop; Hip hop
- Instrument: Vocals
- Years active: 2017–present
- Label: Gramarie Entertainment
- Formerly of: Nine Percent

Chinese name
- Traditional Chinese: 王琳凱
- Simplified Chinese: 王琳凯
Transcriptions
Standard Mandarin
- Hanyu Pinyin: Wáng Línkǎi

Wang Linkai (Chinese: 王琳凯; born 20 May 1999), commonly known by his stage name Xiao Gui (Chinese: 小鬼; pinyin: Xiǎo Guǐ; Lil Ghost in English), is a Chinese rapper and singer-songwriter who creates rap as his main form of musical expression. He began his career as a contestant on the rap competition show The Rap of China in 2017. The following year, Wang rose to fame after joining the reality survival show Idol Producer debuting as a member of Chinese boy band Nine Percent. After the group's disbandment in 2019, Wang began his solo career.

== Personal life ==
Wang was born in Haiyang City, Yantai, Shandong Province on 20 May 1999, and grew up in Xiamen City, Fujian Province. He is currently studying at Beijing Contemporary Music Academy.

His father was a military officer, and his mother was a member of the art corps of the army, so Wang grew up in the army when he was young. He became interested in hip-hop at the age of 12 or 13, and later went to school in Beijing.

== Career ==
=== 2016–2019: Rap of China and Idol Producer ===
Wang signed with Gramarie Entertainment as a trainee. In 2017, Wang participated in iQiYi’s self-made hip-hop reality show The Rap of China, where he won the top 70 in the country and officially began his career in the entertainment industry. In the same year, Wang signed a contract with iQiYi's brokerage company was Guoran Sky. Later that year, he starred in a music video of Will Pan, a judge on the show, and released his first single with fellow contestant J.zen (朱星傑) titled "Bingo!Ca$h".

In January 2018, Wang participated in iQiYi's reality show Idol Producer; he finished in the 8th place with a total of 7,856,601 votes and debuted as a member of Nine Percent. On 20 November, Nine Percent's first music album "TO THE NINES" was released.

In March 2019, Wang participated as a regular cast on an iQiYi's RV reality show, Flower Road (青春的花路). On 11 May, he attended Music Pioneer Awards's 30th Year Three Class Grand Award Ceremony, where he won the Best Newcomer Artist of 2018 as well as the Most Popular Artist of 2018. Wang released his first personal EP Lil Ghost 2.0 on 20 May. In August, he won the Newcomer of the Year Recommended by All Media award and his song "Good Night" was named among the Golden Melodies of the Year at the Global Chinese Pop Chart Awards held at Beijing National Stadium.

On 26 September 2019, Nine Percent's second and last album More Than Forever (限定的记忆) was released before the group officially graduated and disbanded on 6 October. Wang performed alongside Nine Percent in Guangzhou for Nine Percent's final concert on 12 October. The Nine Percent members then shifted to solo careers.

=== 2020–present: Solo career activities ===
In March 2020, Wang joined Zhejiang Satellite TV music program Sound from Heaven. On 8 April, he released his second EP From M to W. In June, he participated in Mango TV's rap music variety show Rap Star. and the variety show Crossover Singer. On 17 October, Wang participated in the virtual character talent show Dimension Nova. On 8 November, he joined the Oriental TV's intergenerational tidal performance variety show China Dream Voice Our Song Season 2.

In 2021, Wang released a number of new works, including "Don't Call Me Da Vinci (Punk Version)" and "Mood (Lil Ghost Remix Explicit)", a remix of the original song by 24KGoldn featuring Iann Dior. The latter of which received wide acclaim. On 3 July, he embarked on his first concert tour, Finding Ghost, at the Mercedes-Benz Arena in Shanghai.

In 2023, Wang embarked on his second concert tour, titled Deadline. In 2024, Wang joined the music variety show Melody Journey and collaborated with songwriters on "I Want to Write a Song for You" (想給你寫首歌), "Worst Kind of Love", and "The Years That Were Good to Me" (對我好的那些年).

== Filmography ==
=== Television series ===
| Year | Title | Chinese Title | Network | Role | Ref |
|---|---|---|---|---|---|
| 2019 | The First Light | 晨阳 | iQiYi | Himself | |

=== Reality/variety shows ===
| Year | Title | Chinese Title | Network | Notes | Ref. |
|---|---|---|---|---|---|
| 2017 | The Rap of China | 中国有嘻哈 | iQiYi | Contestant | |
| 2018 | Idol Producer | 偶像练习生 | iQiYi | Contestant; Finished 8th | |
| 2018 | Fantasy restaurant | 奇妙的食光 | iQiYi | Cast member | |
| 2018 | Sister's Flower Shop | 小姐姐的花店 | iQiYi | Cast member | |
| 2018 | Brave World | 勇敢的世界 | Hunan TV | Cast member | |
| 2019 | Beautiful Youth | 青春的花路 | iQiYi | Cast member | |
| 2019 | Our Song | 我们的歌 | iQiYi | Cast member | |
| 2020 | | 我要这样生活 | iQiYi | Cast member | |
| 2020 | Rap Star | 说唱听我的 | Mango TV | Judge | |
| 2020 | Crossover Singer | 跨界歌王 | Beijing TV | Host | |
| 2020 | Go Newbies | 新手驾到 | Hunan TV | Cast member | |
| 2020 | Dimension Nova | 跨次元新星 | iQiYi | Cast member | |
| 2021 | The Romance | 恋恋剧中人 | iQiYi | Cast member | |
| 2021 | The Flash Band | 闪光的乐队 | Zhejiang TV | Cast member | |
| 2024 | Melody Journey | 音乐缘计划 | iQiYi | Singer | |

== Discography ==
=== Extended plays ===
| Title | Album details | Sales |
|---|---|---|
| Lil Ghost 2.0 | Released: 20 May 2019; Language: Mandarin; Label: Gramarie Entertainment; Track listing: 1. "别叫我达芬奇"; 2. "原来"; 3. "Come Back" (救赎); 4. "Tiger" | —N/a |
| From M to W | Released: 8 April 2020; Language: Mandarin; Label: Gramarie Entertainment; Track listing: 1. "How Should It Be" (到底要怎么样); 2. "If I Can"; 3. "最后的外卖" (Unplugged version); 4. "The Last Takeout" (最瘦的外卖); 5. "How Have You Been Recently" (你最近好吗) | —N/a |

=== Studio albums ===
| Title | Album details | Sales |
|---|---|---|
| Deadline | Released: 20 May 2022; Language: Mandarin; Label: Gramarie Entertainment; Track listing: 1. "把更多的时间花在音乐上 (Intro)"; 2. "逆流而上"; 3. "亲手sus 爱情"; 4. "她妈妈说我们八不合"; 5. "哈莉•奎茵"; 6. "我希望我永远也不知道你的那些破事"; 7. "猗窝座"; 8. "生死有命"; 9. "Super Villain"; 10. "十八岁之前统治宇宙"; 11. "给我点时间"; 12. "不良少年"; 13. "Shining in the dark" 14. "为明天写封信"; 15. "死线"; 16. "蔚蓝星球上的蛀虫 (Outro)" | —N/a |

=== Singles ===
| Title | Year | Peak chart positions | Album |
| Title | Year | CHN (Note: The Billboard China Top 100 was launched in January 2019 by Billboard China but hasn't been updated since 6 September 2019. QQ Music has been used to list charted songs after September) | Album |
|---|---|---|---|
| "Good Night" | 2018 | —N/a | Non-album single |
| "Unicorn" | 2018 | —N/a | Non-album single |
| "Confused" (扑朔迷离 (跑得快)) | 2018 | —N/a | Non-album single |
| "I.W.A.B.N" | 2018 | —N/a | Non-album single |
| "Up" (上) | 2019 | —N/a | Non-album single |
| "Black" (黑白) | 2019 | —N/a | Non-album single |
| "Don’t Call Me Da Vinci" (别叫我达芬奇) | 2019 | —N/a | Non-album single |
| "Favor" (偏愛) | 2019 | —N/a | Non-album single |
| "If I Can" | 2020 | — | From M to W |
| "Pinky Murder" | 2020 | — | — |
| "NO 808" | 2020 | | |
| "What's Wrong With Me" | 2020 | | |
| "Please World (拜托了世界)" | 2021 | | |
| "Raining" | 2021 | | |
| "Bad Boy (不良少年)" | 2021 | | |
| "Supervillain" | 2021 | | |
| "Graduation Note (毕业记)" | 2022 | | |
| "Constantly (时时刻刻)" | 2022 | | |
| “Tracing (追迹)” | 2023 | | |
| "Hadn't Met You" | 2023 | | |
| "Last Day" | 2023 | | |
| "Good Life" | 2023 | | |
| "Winter Without You (没有你的冬天)" | 2024 | | |
| "sweater" | 2024 | | |
| "The Beauty of the Broken (破碎的却美丽的)" | 2024 | | |
| "Tired Bird (倦鸟)" | 2024 | | |
| "David&Lucy" | 2024 | | |
| "Sound Medicine (音药)" | 2024 | | |
| 你是我向流星许愿的原因 | 2025 | | |
| "right by wrong" | 2025 | | |
| "kiss" | 2025 | | |

=== Collaborations ===
| Title | Year | Peak chart positions | Album |
| Title | Year | CHN | Album |
|---|---|---|---|
| "Bingo! Ca$h" (with Zhu Xingjie) | 2017 | —N/a (Note: Billboard China Top 100 hasn't been updated since September 2019) | Non-album single |
| "Friendly Years" "(友情岁月 (概念版))" (with Francis Ng) | 2019 | —N/a | Non-album single |
| "爆运Disco" (with Naomi Wang) | 2020 | — | Non-album single |
| "Prospect" (with Iann Dior) | 2020 | — | |
| "NO 808" (with NYK) | 2020 | — | |
| "Mood" (with 24kGoldn & Iann Dior) | 2021 | — | |
| "Super Vilain" (with NYK) | 2021 | — | |
| "Sweater" (with Sueco) | 2024 | — | |

== Philanthropy ==
- On 28 April 2018, Nine Percent directed a donation of RMB 2 million to "Beijing Hanhong Love Charity Foundation"
- On 9 February 2020, during the outbreak of the novel coronavirus, Wang directed a donation of RMB 200,000 to Xianfeng County People's Hospital and Badong County People's Hospital
- On 21 July 2021, Wang donated 200,000 yuan to the Red Cross Society of Zhengzhou when many people were trapped by heavy rain in Henan Province.

== Awards ==
- In September 2017, he was awarded the "Ruili Sunshine Fund" Vitality Charity Role Model Award by the Model Women Charity Night.
- On 29 August 2018, he won the All-Media Recommended New Artist of the Year award and his original work "Good Night" won the Golden Song of the Year award at the Chinese Songs and Music Festival.
- On 11 May 2019, he won the 2018 Pioneer Creative Newcomer Award, 2018 Most Popular Singer Award, 2018 Most appealing Fan Group Award, and the song "Shang" won the Pioneer Golden Melody Award.
- On 30 June 2019, he won the Best Popular Idol Award at the 2019 China Fashion Awards.
- 6 December 2019, iQiYi Scream Night live Expressive Singer of the Year.
- On 28 November 2020, he won the most popular male rapper in QQ Music.
- On 10 December 2020, he was awarded the MAHB Esquire Awards Music Icon of the Year.
- On 23 January 2021, won QQ Music - Rap Musician of the Year.
