= We Are Young (TV series) =

- No. of episodes: 10

Release
- Original network: Youku; ETtoday
- Original release: June 26 – August 28, 2020

We Are Young (Chinese: 少年之名; pinyin: Shàonián zhī míng) is a 2020 Chinese male group reality competition show, which premiered on June 26, 2020, at Youku, and consists of 10 episodes. The show focuses on 84 male trainees which compete to debut in the winning 7-member group, S.K.Y.

The final 7-member group, which consist of members Lin Mo, Hu Wen Xuan, Zheng Ren Yu, Zuo Ye, Zuo Linjie, Guo Zhen and Li Xi Kan, were debuted on the season finale on 28 August 2020.

== Production ==
The show is the only male group survival show in 2020, as other survival show focuses on female groups this year.

The show was announced on April 23, 2020, with veteran Chinese singers Lay Zhang, Tiger Hu, Cheng Xiao, Ryu Han, and Guo Jingming serving as mentors on each aspects for the program. The cast of 84 males participating this program came from all across the world including China, with some contestants had record in music experience and had a history of participating in a reality competition.

== Contestants ==
There are 84 members participated in this competition, the ranking is determined through a public online voting. Meanwhile, trainees who were unplaced are unable to advance through the first evaluation by mentors. The table denotes the final rank of all trainees:

Members
| Name | Nationality/Region | Birthday | Management company | Past experience | Final placement |
|---|---|---|---|---|---|
| Oscar Wang | China / Brazil | July 30, 1998 | Hot Idol (好好栮朷) | Former Cube Entertainment trainee | 19 |
| Lin Mo (林陌) | China | November 20, 1993 | Star Master Entertainment (匠星娱乐) | Leader of Mr. Tyger; Youth with You contestant | 7 |
| Hu Wen Xuan (胡文煊) | China | May 23, 1999 | Yuehua Entertainment (乐华娱乐) | Former Desert5 member; Youth with You contestant | 3 |
| Zheng Ren Yu (郑人予) | China | August 30, 1996 | Why Entertainment (为什么) | The Coming One and Super Idol contestant | 6 |
| Zuo Ye (左叶) | China | March 18, 2001 | OACA Entertainment (觉醒东方) | Member of Awaken-F; Idol Producer contestant | 5 |
| Zuo Linjie (左林杰) | China | January 30, 2002 | Hongyi Entertainment (红熠文化) | Former FNC Entertainment trainee | 2 |
| Guo Zhen (郭震) | China | August 11, 2002 | GME | The Coming One (season 2) contestant | 4 |
| Li Xi Kan | China | April 11, 1998 | Individual Trainees | Former member of MR-X, Cube Entertainment trainee and Idol Producer contestant | 1 |
| Lin Ran (林染) | China | August 14, 1999 | AIF Entertainment (AIF娱乐) | Member of Golden Age; Produce Camp 2019 contestant | 8 |
| Smith / Liu Ze Xu (刘泽旭) | Thailand | July 23, 1998 | CHAAN CREATIONS | Member of THE FINS; Thai actor | Unplaced |
| Chen Jia Jin (陈家瑨) | Thailand | July 23, 1998 | Handsome International Entertainment (汉森娱乐) | | Unplaced |
| Su Xun Lun (苏勋伦) | China | May 20, 2000 | Yuehua Entertainment (乐华娱乐) | Member of New Storm and former All For One Contestant | 11 |
| Yang Bing Zhuo (阳兵卓) | China | February 24, 1999 | 1CM Lingyu Entertainment (1CM领誉) | Member of New Storm and former All For One contestant | 46 |
| He Yi Jun (何懿峻) | China | November 6, 2000 | Jay Walk New Joy (嘉行传媒) | | 47 |
| Zhang Ming Xuan (张铭轩) | China | November 21, 1996 | Hot Idol (好好栮朷) | Former Produce Camp 2019 contestant | Unplaced |
| Zhang Tian Ci (张天赐) | China | March 17, 2002 | Individual Trainee | | 18 |
| Zi Yu (梓渝) | China | July 6, 2002 | Huakaibanxia Cultural Media (花开半夏文化传媒) | | 33 |
| Yang Zi Xin (杨梓鑫) | China | November 15, 1996 | Creative Entertainment (创意娱乐) | Member of C.T.O and former Super Boys contestant | 25 |
| Yang Yue (杨悦) | China | September 4, 1996 | Luna Kingdom (萌月文化) | Member of AZA | Unplaced |
| Yang Cheng (杨诚) | China | October 21, 2001 | Xinhua Beiyi Culture (新华北一文化) | Member of YES!CAMP | Unplaced |
| Chen Ruize | China | June 15 | Starship Entertainment(宇宙星船) | | Unplaced |
| Xue Conglin (薛琮霖) | Taiwan | February 3, 2002 | Star Moon Media (觉得娱乐) | | Unplaced |
| Yang Zhao Yang (杨朝阳) | China | October 26, 1999 | SDT Entertainment (SDT娱乐) | Former Youth With You contestant | 42 |
| Duan Xu Yu (段旭宇) | China | February 13, 2000 | Xshow Entertainment (新美星秀) | Former Youth With You contestant | 17 |
| Wang Zi Yun (王梓沄) | China | January 1, 2001 | TH Entertainment (天浩盛世) | Twins, Member of ALIBI | 40 |
| Wang Zi Ao (王梓澳) | China | January 1, 2001 | TH Entertainment (天浩盛世) | Twins, Member of ALIBI | Unplaced |
| Wang Lin Kai (王琳凯) | China | September 27, 2000 | Individual Trainee | | 48 |
| Yan An (颜安) | China | October 27, 2000 | Individual Trainee | | Walked |
| Andy Xu (徐安迪) | United States | | Individual Trainee | | Unplaced |
| Tao Yuan (陶源) | China | August 17, 2000 | One Cool Jacso Entertainment (天加一文化) | | Unplaced |
| Tang Yu Qin (汤寓钦) | China | February 15, 1998 | SDT Entertainment (SDT娱乐) | | Unplaced |
| Lan Taoyi (兰陶倚) | China | June 26, 1997 | Luna Kingdom (萌月文化) | Member of AZA | Unplaced |
| Li Ziyao (李子尧) | China | June 22, 1996 | Luna Kingdom (萌月文化) | Member of AZA | Unplaced |
| Su Er (苏尔) | China | October 19, 2000 | Individual Trainees | Former Star of Asia and Super Idol contestant | 43 |
| Alfred Sng | Singapore | November 16, 1991 | Individual Trainee | | 30 |
| Jarrell Huang Jun Rong | Singapore | October 14, 2000 | Wise Music (明智的音乐) | Former SPOP Sing! contestant | 22 |
| Batu Tulaga (巴图图拉嘎) | Mongolia | November 8, 1998 | Second Studio (第二工作室) | | Unplaced |
| Chen Junhao (陈俊豪) | China | December 24, 1999 | M+ Entertainment (木加互娱) | | 27 |
| Chen Yichen (陈一辰) | China | June 16, 2000 | Individual Trainee | | 28 |
| Huang Enyu (黄恩昱) | China | December 25, 1996 | TZ Media (弹指之间文化) | | 29 |
| Liu Cong (刘聪) | China | September 29, 2001 | Xinhua Beiyi Culture (新华北一文化) | Member of YES!CAMP | 50 |
| Ma Haowen (马昊文) | China | September 28, 1998 | Xinhua Beiyi Culture (新华北一文化) | Member of YES!CAMP | 49 |
| Qu Baiyu (屈柏宇) | China | June 18, 2001 | Xinhua Beiyi Culture (新华北一文化) | Member of YES!CAMP | 34 |
| Shen Bohuai (沈博怀) | China | January 24, 1998 | SDT Entertainment (SDT娱乐) | Former Youth with You contestant | 36 |
| Zuo Qibo (左其铂) | China | January 19, 1992 | 1CM Lingyu Entertainment (1CM领誉) | Former Swim-E member, former Super Idol and The Next Top Bang contestant | Unplaced |
| Zhen Nan (圳南) | China | September 27, 1993 | Star Master Entertainment (匠星娱乐) | Member of the Chinese boy group Mr. Tyger and former Youth with You contestant | 14 |
| Zhan Yu (展羽) | China | June 21, 1997 | Star Master Entertainment (匠星娱乐) | Member of the Chinese boy group Mr. Tyger and former Youth with You contestant | 16 |
| Yang Chaowen (杨超文) | China | November 2, 2001 | Summer Star Entertainment (夏日之星娱乐) | Member of Summer Cubs | 9 |
| Xu Zhen Xuan (徐振轩) | China | February 25, 2002 | 金锭影视 | | 13 |
| Wang Zhao Lin (王昭霖) | China | June 30, 1998 | Second Studio (第二工作室) | | Unplaced |
| Sun Boran (孙铂然) | China | December 20, 2000 | 1CM Lingyu Entertainment (1CM领誉) | Former The Coming One contestant | 39 |
| Qian Zhe (千喆) | China | June 26, 1996 | Mango Entertainment (芒果娱乐) | | Unplaced |
| Mu Xingyuan (慕星远) | China | April 12, 1997 | Star Master Entertainment (匠星娱乐) | Former All For One contestant | 44 |
| Ke Bolun (柯博伦) | China | July 17, 1999 | PC Entertainment (伟峰娱乐) | Member of Ageboy | Unplaced |
| Yuan Lin Qing (袁林青) | China | May 3, 1998 | One Leader Entertainment (万立达娱乐) | | 21 |
| Jin Fan (靳凡) | China | November 27, 1994 | Star Master Entertainment (匠星娱乐) | Member of the Chinese boy group Mr. Tyger and former Youth with You contestant | 26 |
| Cui Shaopeng (崔少鹏) | China | April 10, 1997 | Big Picture Universal (星映环球) | Member of CORE ONE and former contestant of Youth with You | 12 |
| Zuli Year (祖力亚尔) | China | August 28, 1999 | Singularity Entertainment (奇点娱乐) | | Unplaced |
| Chen Xinhai (陈鑫海) | China | | D.Wang Entertainment (大王娱乐) | | 23 |
| Kou Cong (寇聪) | China | April 10, 1999 | FutureONE Entertainment (未来壹娱乐) | Former Youth With You contestant | 15 |
| Xue En (薛恩) | Taiwan | August 21, 1998 | Creative Entertainment (创造力娱乐) | Member of C.T.O | 24 |
| Zhan Shiwei (詹仕伟) | Taiwan | January 8, 1997 | Creative Entertainment (创造力娱乐) | Member of C.T.O | 38 |
| Li Zhenwei (李振纬) | Taiwan | November 8, 1998 | Creative Entertainment (创造力娱乐) | Member of C.T.O | Unplaced |
| Weng Yuqing (翁宇庆) | Taiwan | February 11, 1997 | Creative Entertainment (创造力娱乐) | Member of C.T.O | Unplaced |
| Wang Zining (王梓宁) | China | February 3, 1995 | Creative Entertainment (创造力娱乐) | Member of C.T.O | Unplaced |
| Li Chenxu (李宸旭) | China | April 10, 2002 | Younger Family (年轻的家庭) | | 31 |
| Xu Zhao Hao (许钊豪) | China | February 2, 1998 | 广东粤语传媒 | | 32 |
| Luo Jie (罗杰) | China | July 19, 1998 | Mavericks Entertainment (麦锐娱乐) | Former Idol Producer and The Next Top Bang contestant | Walked |
| Xu Shengen (徐圣恩) | China | April 3, 1996 | Mercury Nation (辰星娱乐) | Former member of Kepler11 and Idol Producer contestant | 10 |
| Wu Shanyu (吴善宇) | China | May 22, 1996 | Mercury Nation (辰星娱乐) | Member of GELA-X | Unplaced |
| Guo Yikang (郭奕康) | China | February 15, 1999 | MM Entertainment (MM娱乐) | | Unplaced |
| Wang Qibo (王麒博) | China | July 30, 2000 | Individual Trainee | | Unplaced |
| Li Chengxi (李承熹) | China | December 18, 1998 | 盛宏娱乐 | | Unplaced |
| Fan Yu (凡宇) | China | March 5, 1996 | 奇大音乐 | | Walked |
| Xiao Yi En (萧易恩) | Taiwan | October 9, 1993 | One Leader Entertainment (万立达娱乐) | Dance Smash contestant | Unplaced |
| Hong Zhenhui (洪振辉) | China | May 15, 1998 | Caster Studio (脚轮工作室) | Model | 41 |
| Qin Zhuqiang (秦柱强) | China | August 12, 1999 | Hua Ying Yi Xing (华影艺星) | | 45 |
| Liu Tanghui (刘唐辉) | China | July 20, 2000 | 舒芙蕾娱乐 | | Unplaced |
| Xu Yi Hang (徐一航) | China | March 21, 2000 | Individual Trainee | | Unplaced |
| Zhang Chaoxi (张潮汐) | China | February 12, 2000 | BG Entertainment (黑金计划) | | Unplaced |
| Fu Renjie (符仁杰) | China | January 1, 2000 | 英模文化 | | Unplaced |
| Li Boyuan (李馞源) | China | April 19, 1999 | BG Entertainment (黑金计划) | | Unplaced |
| Hong Wei Hao (洪伟豪) | China | June 3, 1997 | WASS Music (玖玖玖加) | | 37 |
| Li Hao (李昊) | China | July 2, 1997 | Sign Entertainment (标牌娱乐) | Actor and former The Coming One contestant | 20 |
| Li Zaixi (李在溪) | China/United States | November 11, 1997 | SHKQ Entertainment (新地娱乐) | | 35 |

== Episode results ==
Results per stage
| Name | Placement (Online) | | Placement (Online+live) | Placement (Online) | Placement (Online+live) | | Final placement |
| Name | Week 3 | Week 4 | Week 7 | Week 8 | Week 9 | Week 10 | Final placement |
Winning members
| Li Xikan (李希侃) | 1 | 1 | 1 | 1 | 1 | 1 | 1 |
| Zuo Linjie (左林傑) | 2 | 2 | 2 | 2 | 2 | 2 | 2 |
| Hu Wenxuan (胡文煊) | 5 | 4 | 4 | 4 | 4 | 3 | 3 |
| Guo Zhen (郭震) | 8 | 7 | 5 | 5 | 6 | 4 | 4 |
| Zuo Ye (左叶) | 4 | 4 | 5 | 6 | 3 | 5 | 5 |
| Zheng Renyu (鄭人予) | 19 | 19 | 18 | 10 | 11 | 6 | 6 |
| Lin Mo (林陌) | 6 | 6 | 6 | 3 | 5 | 7 | 7 |
Eliminated in the grand finals (Week 10)
| Lin Ran (林染) | 9 | 8 | 8 | 7 | 8 | 8 | 8 |
| Yang Chaowen (楊超文) | 7 | 9 | 9 | 9 | 9 | 9 | 9 |
| Xu Shengen (徐聖恩) | 3 | 3 | 3 | 8 | 7 | 10 | 10 |
| Su Xunlun (苏勛倫) | 10 | 10 | 10 | 11 | 10 | 11 | 11 |
| Cui Shaopeng (崔少鵬) | 16 | 12 | 12 | 12 | 12 | 12 | 12 |
| Xu Zhenxuan (徐振軒) | 24 | 21 | 21 | 13 | 14 | 13 | 13 |
| Zhen Nan (圳南) | 22 | 18 | 16 | 14 | 13 | 14 | 14 |
Eliminated in the semi-finals (Week 9)
| Kou Cong (寇聪) | 13 | 14 | 14 | 17 | 15 | Eliminated (Week 9) | 15 |
| Zhan Yu (展羽) | 18 | 16 | 15 | 19 | 16 | Eliminated (Week 9) | 16 |
| Duan Xuyu (段旭宇) | 40 | 29 | 25 | 16 | 17 | Eliminated (Week 9) | 17 |
| Zhang Tianci (張天賜) | 15 | 13 | 13 | 18 | 18 | Eliminated (Week 9) | 18 |
| Oscar (奧斯卡) | 12 | 17 | 19 | 15 | 19 | Eliminated (Week 9) | 19 |
| Li Hao (李昊) | 27 | 28 | 28 | 27 | 20 | Eliminated (Week 9) | 20 |
| Yuan Linqing (袁林青) | 29 | 11 | 11 | 20 | 21 | Eliminated (Week 9) | 21 |
| Jarrell Huang Jun Rong(黃俊融) | 48 | 44 | 43 | 28 | 22 | Eliminated (Week 9) | 22 |
| Chen Xinhai (陳鑫海) | 17 | 20 | 20 | 21 | 23 | Eliminated (Week 9) | 23 |
| Xue En (薛恩) | 23 | 24 | 24 | 23 | 24 | Eliminated (Week 9) | 24 |
| Yang Zixin (杨梓鑫) | 25 | 22 | 23 | 24 | 25 | Eliminated (Week 9) | 25 |
| Jin Fan (靳凡) | 26 | 26 | 22 | 25 | 26 | Eliminated (Week 9) | 26 |
| Chen Junhao (陳俊豪) | 14 | 15 | 17 | 22 | 27 | Eliminated (Week 9) | 27 |
| Chen Yichen (陳一辰) | 20 | 25 | 26 | 26 | 28 | Eliminated (Week 9) | 28 |
| Huang Enyu (黃恩昱) | 38 | 40 | 41 | 29 | 29 | Eliminated (Week 9) | 29 |
| Alfred Sng / Sun Ying Hao (孫英豪) | 37 | 30 | 30 | 30 | 30 | Eliminated (Week 9) | 30 |
| Li Chenxu (李宸旭) | 30 | 37 | 37 | 31 | 31 | Eliminated (Week 9) | 31 |
| Xu Zhao Hao (許釗豪) | 39 | 39 | 39 | 32 | 32 | Eliminated (Week 9) | 32 |
Eliminated after the third showcase (Week 7)
| Zi Yu (梓渝) | 21 | 23 | 27 | Eliminated (Week 7) | | | 33 |
| Qu Baiyu (屈柏宇) | 44 | 32 | 29 | Eliminated (Week 7) | | | 34 |
| Li Zaixi (李在溪) | 28 | 27 | 31 | Eliminated (Week 7) | | | 35 |
| Shen Bohuai (沈博懷) | 31 | 31 | 32 | Eliminated (Week 7) | | | 36 |
| Hong Weihao (洪偉豪) | 34 | 34 | 33 | Eliminated (Week 7) | | | 37 |
| Zhan Shiwei (詹仕偉) | 41 | 33 | 34 | Eliminated (Week 7) | | | 38 |
| Sun Boran (孫鉑然) | 33 | 35 | 35 | Eliminated (Week 7) | | | 39 |
| Wang Ziyun (王梓澐) | 42 | 41 | 36 | Eliminated (Week 7) | | | 40 |
| Hong Zhenhui (洪振輝) | 36 | 43 | 38 | Eliminated (Week 7) | | | 41 |
| Yang Zhaoyang (杨朝陽) | 32 | 36 | 40 | Eliminated (Week 7) | | | 42 |
| Su Er (蘇爾) | 35 | 39 | 42 | Eliminated (Week 7) | | | 43 |
| Mu Xingyuan (慕星遠) | 46 | 42 | 44 | Eliminated (Week 7) | | | 44 |
| Qin Zhuqiang (秦柱強) | 49 | 47 | 45 | Eliminated (Week 7) | | | 45 |
| Yang Bingzhuo (陽兵卓) | 45 | 45 | 46 | Eliminated (Week 7) | | | 46 |
| He Yijun (何懿峻) | 47 | 49 | 47 | Eliminated (Week 7) | | | 47 |
| Wang Linkai (王琳凱) | 43 | 46 | 48 | Eliminated (Week 7) | | | 48 |
| Ma Haowen (馬昊文) | 50 | 48 | 49 | Eliminated (Week 7) | | | 49 |
| Liu Cong (劉聰) | 51 | 50 | 50 | Eliminated (Week 7) | | | 50 |
Eliminated in the first evaluation (Week 2)
| Andy Xu (徐安迪) | Eliminated (Week 2) | | | | | | |
| Yang Cheng (楊誠) | Eliminated (Week 2) | | | | | | |
| Chen Ruize (陳瑞澤) | Eliminated (Week 2) | | | | | | |
| Xue Conglin (薜琮霖) | Eliminated (Week 2) | | | | | | |
| Wang Zhaolin (王昭霖) | Eliminated (Week 2) | | | | | | |
| Ke Bolun (柯博伦) | Eliminated (Week 2) | | | | | | |
| Wang Ziao (王梓澳) | Eliminated (Week 2) | | | | | | |
| Tao Yuan (陶源) | Eliminated (Week 2) | | | | | | |
| Wang Qibo (王麟博) | Eliminated (Week 2) | | | | | | |
| Liu Tanghui (劉唐輝) | Eliminated (Week 2) | | | | | | |
| Xu Yihang (徐一航) | Eliminated (Week 2) | | | | | | |
| Zhang Chaoxi (張潮汐) | Eliminated (Week 2) | | | | | | |
| Fu Renjie (符仁傑) | Eliminated (Week 2) | | | | | | |
| Zuli Year (祖力雅爾) | Eliminated (Week 2) | | | | | | |
| Li Boyuan (李馞源) | Eliminated (Week 2) | | | | | | |
| Guo Yikang (郭奕康) | Eliminated (Week 2) | | | | | | |
| Li Chengxi (李承熹) | Eliminated (Week 2) | | | | | | |
| Li Zhenwei (李振緯) | Eliminated (Week 2) | | | | | | |
| Batu Tulaga (巴圖圖拉嘎) | Eliminated (Week 2) | | | | | | |
| Chen Jiajin (陳家瑨) | Eliminated (Week 2) | | | | | | |
| Smith / Liu Zexu (劉澤旭) | Eliminated (Week 2) | | | | | | |
| Tang Yuqin (湯寓欽) | Eliminated (Week 2) | | | | | | |
| Lan Taoyi (蘭陶倚) | Eliminated (Week 2) | | | | | | |
| Weng Yuqing (翁宇慶) | Eliminated (Week 2) | | | | | | |
| Zhang Mingxuan (張銘軒) | Eliminated (Week 2) | | | | | | |
| Yang Yue (楊悅) | Eliminated (Week 2) | | | | | | |
| Qian Zhe (千喆) | Eliminated (Week 2) | | | | | | |
| Li Ziyao (李子堯) | Eliminated (Week 2) | | | | | | |
| Wu Shanyu (吳善宇) | Eliminated (Week 2) | | | | | | |
| Wang Zining (王梓寧) | Eliminated (Week 2) | | | | | | |
| Xiao Yien (蕭易恩) | Eliminated (Week 2) | | | | | | |
| Zuo Qibo (左其鉑) | Eliminated (Week 2) | | | | | | |
Withdrew contestants
| Fan Yu (凡宇) | Walked (Week 2) | | | | | | |
| Yan An (顏安) | Walked (Week 2) | | | | | | |
| Luo Jie (羅杰) | 7 | Walked (Week 3) | | | | | |

== Season summary ==
The series consist of 10 weeks and 16 episodes overall. The first two weeks are first evaluation whereas 83 contestants (one contestant withdrew before the end of the phase) are put through to a mentoring session, and the mentors have to reduce the total finalists down to 52. However, due to the withdrawal of two contestants, the 50 finalists performed in three showcases and celebrated in a non-competition fifth week over five weeks of non-elimination. On week 7, a public vote eliminated 18 contestants after the third showcase. The semi-finals on Week 9 featured a third batch of elimination for another 18 contestants, leaving 14 contestants to compete in the live grand finals on August 28.

| Episode | Title | Original release date | ZH viewers (millions) |
|---|---|---|---|
| 1 | "First Evaluation (part 1)"; Transliteration: "Chūwǔtái píngjí (shàng)" (Chinese: 初舞台评级（上）) | 26 June 2020 | N/A |
| 2 | "First Evaluation (part 2)"; Transliteration: "Chūwǔtái píngjí (xià)" (Chinese: 初舞台评级（下）) | 3 July 2020 | N/A |
| 3 | "First Showcase"; Transliteration: "Dì yī cì gōngyǎn" (Chinese: 第一次公演) | 10 July 2020 | N/A |
| 4 | "Second Showcase"; Transliteration: "Dì èr cì gōngyǎn" (Chinese: 第二次公演) | 17 July 2020 | N/A |
| 5 | "Boy Party"; Transliteration: "Shàonián pàiduì" (Chinese: 少年派對) | 24 July 2020 | N/A |
| 6 | "Third Showcase (part 1)"; Transliteration: "Dì sān cì gōngyǎn (shàng)" (Chinese: 第三次公演（上）) | 31 July 2020 | N/A |
| 7 | "Third Showcase (part 2)"; Transliteration: "Dì sān cì gōngyǎn (xià)" (Chinese: 第三次公演（下）) | 7 August 2020 | N/A |
| 8 | "Boy Escapes"; Transliteration: "Shàonián chūtáo jì" (Chinese: 少年出逃記) | 14 August 2020 | N/A |
| 9 | "Fourth Showcase (Semi-Finals)"; Transliteration: "Dì sì cì gōngyǎn" (Chinese: 第四次公演) | 21 August 2020 | N/A |
| 10 | "Grand Finals"; Transliteration: "Zǒng juésài" (Chinese: 總決賽) | 28 August 2020 | N/A |

== Notes ==
Jackson Yee joined the first two episodes as the Youth Explorer. Due to hectic schedule Youth Producer Lay Zhang wasn't able to join every episode.
