= Qin Fen =

Chinese rapper and singer

- 秦奋
- Born: 31 August 1991 (age 34); Jiangxi, China
- Other names: Roi; Roi Qin
- Occupations: Rapper; singer; host
- Musical career
- Genres: K-pop; hip hop; Mandopop
- Instruments: Vocals
- Years active: 2014–present
- Labels: JK Space Entertainment; SS Entertainment; OACA Entertainment
- Member of: Awaken-F
- Formerly of: The Legend

Qin Fen
- Traditional Chinese: 秦奮
- Simplified Chinese: 秦奋
Transcriptions
Standard Mandarin
- Hanyu Pinyin: Qín Fèn

Qin Fen (traditional Chinese: 秦奮, Korean: 진분; Wades-Giles: Ch'in Fen; born 31 August 1991) is a Chinese rapper, singer and host. He was a member of the South Korean boy group The Legend under SS Entertainment, and is now a member of OACA Entertainment's Awaken-F.

== Early life ==
Qin was born in Jiangxi, China on 31 August 1991. He is a good friend of fellow Hong Kong rapper, Jackson Wang.

== Career ==
=== Pre-debut ===
Qin was a former Cube Entertainment's trainee before signing for SS Entertainment (formerly known as JK Space Entertainment) where he debuted as a member of The Legend.

=== 2014–2017: The Legend ===
Qin made his debut with The Legend in 2014, where he was the vocalist of the group. They debuted with the first single, "Left Out" released on July 9, 2014. Qin left the group after it was disbanded in May 2017, after their contracts with SS Entertainment were canceled through a lawsuit.

In 2016, Qin took part in his first feature film, 我的吸血鬼大人 playing the role of "Kai Er".

=== 2018–present: Solo activities, Idol Producer and debut with Awaken-F ===
After the disbandment of The Legend, Qin returned to China and signed with OACA Entertainment, where he participated in the boy band reality show, Idol Producer. He made it to the final top 20, but was eventually eliminated in the final episode.

Qin is also a host of the Chinese version of Lipstick Prince.

On 5 November 2018, Qin released his first single, "Show Me", and was peaked 11 at China V Charts. Qin also debuted with OACA Entertainment's new boy band, Awaken-F, with the rapper role.

Qin collaborated with Jackson Wang, and released the single "Another" on 19 June 2019.

== Discography ==
=== Singles ===
Title	Year	Peak chart position	Album
Title	Year	CHN V Chart	Album
"Show Me"	2018	11	Non-album single
Collaborations
"Another" (with Jackson Wang)	2019	—	Non-album single
"—" denotes releases that did not chart or were not released in that region.

== Filmography ==
=== Films ===
Year	English title	Original title	Role	Notes
2016		我的吸血鬼大人	Kai Er	

=== Television shows ===
Year	Title	Chinese title	Network	Notes	Ref.
2018	Idol Producer	偶像练习生	iQiyi	Contestant; Eliminated	
2018	Lipstick Prince	口红王子	QQLive	Host	
2018	Super Kindergarten	超能幼稚园	iQiyi	Teacher	
2019	Lipstick Prince Season 2	口红王子 第二季	QQLive		
