= M4M =

M4M may refer to:

- M4M (band), a Mandopop boy band
- Measure for Measure, a 1603 comedy by William Shakespeare
- M4M, an abbreviation in personal advertisements indicating a male seeking relationships with another male
- M4M, an abbreviation for machine-for-machine to describe the data intended to service machine to machine communications
