= Idol Producer =

2018 Chinese reality boy group survival show

- Promotional poster

Chinese name
- Traditional Chinese: 偶像練習生
- Simplified Chinese: 偶像练习生
- Literal meaning: Idol Trainee
Transcriptions
Standard Mandarin
- Hanyu Pinyin: Ǒuxiàng Liànxíshēng
- Genre: Reality competition
- Directed by: Chen Gang
- Creative director: Tang Yan
- Presented by: Lay Zhang
- Starring: Li Ronghao; Jackson Wang; MC Jin; Cheng Xiao; Zhou Jieqiong
- Opening theme: "Ei Ei" by Idol Producer
- Country of origin: China
- Original language: Mandarin
- No. of seasons: 1
- No. of episodes: 12 (list of episodes)

Production
- Executive producers: Wang Xiaohui; Jiang Bin; Lei Ying
- Producer: Jiang Bin
- Camera setup: Multi-camera
- Running time: 94–208 minutes
- Production companies: iQIYI; Beijing Caviar Communications

Original release
- Network: iQIYI
- Release: January 19 – April 6, 2018

Related
- More Than Forever

Idol Producer (simplified Chinese: 偶像练习生; traditional Chinese: 偶像練習生; pinyin: Ǒuxiàng Liànxíshēng) is a 2018 Chinese reality boy group survival show, which premiered on January 19, 2018, on iQIYI. It is presented by Lay Zhang with Li Ronghao, Jackson Wang, MC Jin, Cheng Xiao and Zhou Jieqiong serving as mentors. On April 6, 2018, the nine highest ranked contestants debuted as Nine Percent.

== Concept ==
In 2017, Idol Producer took 100 out of 1908 trainees from 87 entertainment agencies all over Asia, which represented their companies and 8 of whom were independent trainees. The trainees were evaluated multiple times throughout the show by the audience's votes with trainees being eliminated. In the final episode, the nine most-voted-on trainees got to debut as a boy group and were set to promote for 18 months; The voting system is similar to those of South Korean reality television shows Produce 101 and Mix Nine.

== Coaches ==
- Lay Zhang — Production director/mentor
- Li Ronghao — Vocal mentor
- Jackson Wang — Rap mentor
- MC Jin — Rap mentor
- Cheng Xiao — Dance mentor
- Zhou Jieqiong — Dance mentor

== Episodes ==
Series Overview
Season	Episodes	Originally aired	
Season	Episodes	Premiere	Finale
Season 1	12	January 19, 2018	April 6, 2018

=== Episode 1 (January 19) ===
Contestants choose stickers from A to F as a self-assessment to grade themselves. The contestants enter the studio, where 100 seats are arranged in a pyramid with a chair for the #1 trainee at the top. They are introduced by their label and choose seats from 1 to 100. The contestants then give performances for the judges, grouped by agency. The judges then reassign the trainees a grade based on their overall performance, with A being the highest and F the lowest.

E01
Company	Performance	Original Singer	Contestant	Grade
Mavericks Entertainment	"Popularity" (流行)	Li Yuchun	Li Xikan (李希侃)	D
Mavericks Entertainment	"Popularity" (流行)	Li Yuchun	Lü Chenyu (呂晨瑜)	D
Mavericks Entertainment	"Popularity" (流行)	Li Yuchun	Yu Mingjun (余明君)	D
Mavericks Entertainment	"Popularity" (流行)	Li Yuchun	Sun Fanjie (孙凡杰)	F
Mavericks Entertainment	"Popularity" (流行)	Li Yuchun	Deng Langyi (邓烺怡)	F
Mavericks Entertainment	"Popularity" (流行)	Li Yuchun	Luo Zheng (罗正)	F
Ciwen Media	"Can't Help Falling in Love with You" (情非得已)	Harlem Yu	Dong Yanlei (董岩磊)	F
Wild Fire Entertainment	Uptown Funk (Dance Performance)	Mark Ronson ft. Bruno Mars	Xu Kaihao (许凯皓)	B
NewStyle Media	Sadness	M4M	Yu Bin (于斌)	F
Hong Yi Entertainment	Boyfriend	Justin Bieber	He Dongdong (何东东)	D
Hong Yi Entertainment	Boyfriend	Justin Bieber	Li Changgeng (李长庚)	D
Joy Star	Turn Up	Nick Chou	Liang Hui (梁辉)	D
Individual	I wanna get love (Self composed)	Cai Xukun	Cai Xukun (蔡徐坤)	A
A Legend Star Entertainment	"Girl" (女孩) Rumors (Dance Performance)	William Wei Jake Miller	Chen Linong (陈立农)	A

=== Episode 2 (January 26) ===
The rating for the first round is unveiled while the grading sessions for trainees continue. After receiving their initial grade, Zhang Yixing (Lay) announces that the trainees must together perform the show's titular single "Ei Ei" with only three days for preparation. Trainees will have a stand-alone performance that is filmed only once. The coaches give a re-evaluation prior to the filming of the performance to reassign the trainees to another A-F grade. The trainees are then rearranged according to their newly reassigned grade.

E02
Company	Performance	Original Singer	Contestant	Grade
Yuehua Entertainment	EOEO	UNIQ	Zhu Zhengting (朱正廷)	A
Yuehua Entertainment	EOEO	UNIQ	Justin	A
Yuehua Entertainment	EOEO	UNIQ	Li Quanzhe (李权哲)	F
Yuehua Entertainment	EOEO	UNIQ	Ding Zeren (丁泽仁)	A
Yuehua Entertainment	EOEO	UNIQ	Fan Chengcheng (范丞丞)	D
Yuehua Entertainment	EOEO	UNIQ	Bi Wenjun (毕雯珺)	D
Yuehua Entertainment	EOEO	UNIQ	Huang Xinchun (黄新淳)	F
Young Culture	City of Stars (First pure vocalist)	Ryan Gosling & Emma Stone	Qian Zhenghao (钱正昊)	B
OACA	"Eating Fried Chicken in the square" (我在人民广场吃炸鸡)	A Si	Qin Fen (秦奋)	B
OACA	"Eating Fried Chicken in the square" (我在人民广场吃炸鸡)	A Si	Han Mubo (韩沐伯)	C
OACA	"Eating Fried Chicken in the square" (我在人民广场吃炸鸡)	A Si	Jing Peiyao ()	C
OACA	"Eating Fried Chicken in the square" (我在人民广场吃炸鸡)	A Si	Qin Zimo (秦子墨)	D
OACA	"Eating Fried Chicken in the square" (我在人民广场吃炸鸡)	A Si	Zuo Ye (左叶)	F
Gramarie Entertainment	"Young and Dangerous" (Only Cantonese Performance) (乱世巨星) Xiao Gui'sSolo Dance performance Zhu Xingjie's solo Rap performance	Jordan Chan	Xiao Gui (小鬼)	B
Gramarie Entertainment	"Young and Dangerous" (Only Cantonese Performance) (乱世巨星) Xiao Gui'sSolo Dance performance Zhu Xingjie's solo Rap performance	Jordan Chan	Zhang Yankai (张晏恺)	C
Gramarie Entertainment	"Young and Dangerous" (Only Cantonese Performance) (乱世巨星) Xiao Gui'sSolo Dance performance Zhu Xingjie's solo Rap performance	Jordan Chan	Zhou Yanchen (周彦辰)	B
Gramarie Entertainment	"Young and Dangerous" (Only Cantonese Performance) (乱世巨星) Xiao Gui'sSolo Dance performance Zhu Xingjie's solo Rap performance	Jordan Chan	Zhu Xingjie (朱星杰)	B
Hua Ying Yi Xing	Kon Jai Ngai (My Girl) (CHN Ver., ENG Ver., JPN Ver., THA Ver.)	Saranyu Winaipanit	Huang Shuhao (黄书豪)	D
Banana Entertainment	"Let the world be destroyed" (让世界毁灭) Bei Honglin's Solo Rap Performance: "Lose Yourself"	Yoga Lin Eminem	Lin Chaoze (林超泽)	A
Banana Entertainment	"Let the world be destroyed" (让世界毁灭) Bei Honglin's Solo Rap Performance: "Lose Yourself"	Yoga Lin Eminem	Lin Yanjun (林彦俊)	C
Banana Entertainment	"Let the world be destroyed" (让世界毁灭) Bei Honglin's Solo Rap Performance: "Lose Yourself"	Yoga Lin Eminem	Li Ruotian (李若天)	C
Banana Entertainment	"Let the world be destroyed" (让世界毁灭) Bei Honglin's Solo Rap Performance: "Lose Yourself"	Yoga Lin Eminem	Lu Dinghao (陸定昊)	C
Banana Entertainment	"Let the world be destroyed" (让世界毁灭) Bei Honglin's Solo Rap Performance: "Lose Yourself"	Yoga Lin Eminem	Jiang Jingzuo (姜京佐)	C
Banana Entertainment	"Let the world be destroyed" (让世界毁灭) Bei Honglin's Solo Rap Performance: "Lose Yourself"	Yoga Lin Eminem	Qiu Zhixie (邱治谐)	C
Banana Entertainment	"Let the world be destroyed" (让世界毁灭) Bei Honglin's Solo Rap Performance: "Lose Yourself"	Yoga Lin Eminem	You Zhangjing (尤长靖)	B
Banana Entertainment	"Let the world be destroyed" (让世界毁灭) Bei Honglin's Solo Rap Performance: "Lose Yourself"	Yoga Lin Eminem	Gao Maotong (高茂桐)	C
Banana Entertainment	"Let the world be destroyed" (让世界毁灭) Bei Honglin's Solo Rap Performance: "Lose Yourself"	Yoga Lin Eminem	Bei Honglin (贝汯璘)	C
Emperor Entertainment Group	Cotton Candy (棉花糖)	Top Combine	Ming Peng (明鵬)	F
Dimensions Multimedia	I Don't Know		Chen Siqi (陈斯琪)	D
Dimensions Multimedia	I Don't Know		Xu Heni (徐鶴尼)	C
SSTAR	"A Trainee's Confession" 练习生告白		Zhang Yuchen (张宇晨)	F
SSTAR	"A Trainee's Confession" 练习生告白		Luo Jie (罗杰)	D
SSTAR	"A Trainee's Confession" 练习生告白		Li Xinyan (李鑫岩)	F
SSTAR	"A Trainee's Confession" 练习生告白		He Jiageng (何嘉庚)	F
Qin's Entertainment	Antidote (解藥)		Yue Yue (岳岳)	C
Qin's Entertainment	Antidote (解藥)		Mu Ziyang (木子洋)	C
Qin's Entertainment	Antidote (解藥)		Bu Fan (卜凡)	C
Qin's Entertainment	Antidote (解藥)		Ling Chao (灵超)	C
Culture Broadcasting	龙拳 (Long Quan)	Jay Chou	Zhu Yiwen (朱一文)	F
Individual	Uptown Funk (Dance and singing version)	Mark Ronson ft. Bruno Mars	Gan Jun (甘俊)	B
Simply Joy Music	Mr. Lee	BBT	Sun Haoran (孙浩然)	B
Simply Joy Music	Mr. Lee	BBT	Lin Haokai (林浩楷)	B
Simply Joy Music	Mr. Lee	BBT	Wang Ziyi (王子异)	A
Simply Joy Music	Mr. Lee	BBT	Li Zhijie (李志杰)	B
Simply Joy Music	Mr. Lee	BBT	Jing Yihan (金逸涵)	B
Huayi Brothers	头发乱了 (Honey CHN ver.)	張學友 / Jacky Cheung (Park Jin Young)	Zheng Ruibin (郑锐彬)	B
Unaired Performances and Grades
MERCURY NATION	Flower Veil (花的嫁紗)	Cyndi Wang	Rapen	C
MERCURY NATION	Flower Veil (花的嫁紗)	Cyndi Wang	Xu Shengen (徐圣恩)	C
MERCURY NATION	Flower Veil (花的嫁紗)	Cyndi Wang	Gigel	C
MERCURY NATION	Flower Veil (花的嫁紗)	Cyndi Wang	J-ONE	C
MERCURY NATION	Flower Veil (花的嫁紗)	Cyndi Wang	Wang Youchen (王宥辰)	C
MERCURY NATION	Flower Veil (花的嫁紗)	Cyndi Wang	Gary	C

=== Episode 3 (February 2) ===
Training to perform the show's title song "Ei Ei" begins. After three days, the trainees are filmed performing the title song and are reevaluated by the judges. The B, C, D, and F grade trainees vote to select the center of the entire group, settling on individual trainee Cai Xukun, who narrowly defeats trainee Zhu Zhengting by two votes. Trainees with an F grade after the reevaluation are denied the right to perform and must watch the performance as spectators. However, before the performance begins, the judges decide to let some of the particularly hard-working F grade trainees perform.

After recording "Ei Ei", it is revealed that for the second challenge, the trainees will be put into 16 teams to perform 8 songs. Two teams will be performing and competing against each other for each of the 8 songs: Jay Chou's "半兽人 (The Orcs)", "PPAP", Jolin Tsai's "大艺术家 (The Great Artist)", "Dance to the Music", "代号魂斗罗", Zhang Yixing's "Shake", CNBLUE's "Can't Stop", and "Get Ugly". Cai Xukun, because he was the center for the title song "Ei Ei", is allowed to choose his team's members and song first. The members of the winning team for each song will automatically receive 10,000 votes. The judges also announce that half of the trainees will be eliminated from the show following the second challenge. The two "半兽人 (The Orcs)" teams' performance, with the B team beating the A team.

Color key

- Center
- Winning Team

E03
Original singer	Performance song	Group	Group Member	Newest Grade	Responsible part	Number of Personal Votes	Number of Group Votes
Jay Chou	Half-beast Human	Group A 进击的兽人	Dong Yanlei (董岩磊)	F	Vocal	9	169
Jay Chou	Half-beast Human	Group A 进击的兽人	Li Quanzhe (李权哲)	B	Vocal	19	169
Jay Chou	Half-beast Human	Group A 进击的兽人	Xiao Gui (小鬼)	B	Vocal	35	169
Jay Chou	Half-beast Human	Group A 进击的兽人	Li Junyi (李俊毅)	A	Vocal	11	169
Jay Chou	Half-beast Human	Group A 进击的兽人	Jin Yihan (金逸涵)	F	Vocal	19	169
Jay Chou	Half-beast Human	Group A 进击的兽人	Ding Zeren (丁泽仁)	B	Dance	43	169
Jay Chou	Half-beast Human	Group A 进击的兽人	Bu Fan (卜凡)	F	Rap	33	169
Jay Chou	Half-beast Human	Group B Monster	Ming Peng (明鹏)	D	Vocal	23	249
Jay Chou	Half-beast Human	Group B Monster	Jiang Dahe (姜达赫)	F	Vocal	6	249
Jay Chou	Half-beast Human	Group B Monster	Zhu Yuntian (朱匀天)	D	Vocal	42	249
Jay Chou	Half-beast Human	Group B Monster	Bi Wenjun (毕雯珺)	D	Vocal	44	249
Jay Chou	Half-beast Human	Group B Monster	Li Xikan (李希侃)	C	Vocal	80	249
Jay Chou	Half-beast Human	Group B Monster	Zhou Tengyang (周腾阳)	F	Dance	12	249
Jay Chou	Half-beast Human	Group B Monster	Liang Hui (梁辉)	F	Rap	42	249

=== Episode 4 (February 9) ===
The remaining 14 teams' performances are shown. Footage of each team practicing was shown before their respective performances. After the performance of each pair of groups, the live audience is given the opportunity to vote for their favorite member out of both of the competing teams. Individual votes were added up for an overall team score, and 10,000 votes were given to each member of the winning team for each song. Taiwanese trainee Chen Linong of "The Great Artist" team A won the most votes overall, with 10,000 bonus votes added to his 210 live audience votes. Zhang Yixing announces that the 39 trainees with the fewest votes (ranking 61-96) will be eliminated next week. The votes from this week's live performance will be added to the online votes to determine the top 60 trainees.

E04
Original singer	Performance song	Group	Group Member	Newest Grade	Responsible part	Number of Personal Votes	Number of Group Votes
Li Yuchun	Dance to the music	Group A 你复不复古，你不复古我复古	Luo Jie (罗杰)	C	Vocal	21	249
Li Yuchun	Dance to the music	Group A 你复不复古，你不复古我复古	Yu Mingjun (余明君)	D	Vocal	39	249
Li Yuchun	Dance to the music	Group A 你复不复古，你不复古我复古	Jiang Jingzuo (姜京佐)	C	Vocal	54	249
Li Yuchun	Dance to the music	Group A 你复不复古，你不复古我复古	Zhu Yunyi (朱匀一)	D	Dance	47	249
Li Yuchun	Dance to the music	Group A 你复不复古，你不复古我复古	Zhu Xingjie (朱星杰)	B	Rap	87	249
Li Yuchun	Dance to the music	Group A 你复不复古，你不复古我复古	Zhang Yifan (张艺凡)	A	Rap	1	249
Li Yuchun	Dance to the music	Group B 螢火蟲戰隊	Chen Siqi (陈斯琪)	C	Vocal	37	154
Li Yuchun	Dance to the music	Group B 螢火蟲戰隊	Hu Zhibang (胡致邦)	D	Vocal	32	154
Li Yuchun	Dance to the music	Group B 螢火蟲戰隊	Yu Hao (于浩)	F	Vocal	8	154
Li Yuchun	Dance to the music	Group B 螢火蟲戰隊	Zuo Ye (左叶)	D	Dance	19	154
Li Yuchun	Dance to the music	Group B 螢火蟲戰隊	Mu Ziyang (木子洋)	F	Rap	28	154
Li Yuchun	Dance to the music	Group B 螢火蟲戰隊	Jing Peiyao (靖佩瑶)	F	Rap	30	154
Jolin Tsai	The Great Artist	Group A 维纳斯战队	Hou Haoran (侯浩然)	F	Vocal	2	288
Jolin Tsai	The Great Artist	Group A 维纳斯战队	Sun Haoran (孙浩然)	F	Vocal	17	288
Jolin Tsai	The Great Artist	Group A 维纳斯战队	Chen Linong (陈立农)	C	Vocal	210	288
Jolin Tsai	The Great Artist	Group A 维纳斯战队	Bei Honglin (贝汯璘)	B	Vocal	39	288
Jolin Tsai	The Great Artist	Group A 维纳斯战队	Zhang Yixuan (张奕轩)	B	Dance	16	288
Jolin Tsai	The Great Artist	Group A 维纳斯战队	J-ONE	F	Rap	4	288
Jolin Tsai	The Great Artist	Group B 逆袭的向日葵	GIGEL	D	Vocal	10	139
Jolin Tsai	The Great Artist	Group B 逆袭的向日葵	Zhao Yuche (赵俞澈)	D	Vocal	34	139
Jolin Tsai	The Great Artist	Group B 逆袭的向日葵	Zhao Lingfeng (赵凌峰)	D	Vocal	10	139
Jolin Tsai	The Great Artist	Group B 逆袭的向日葵	Huang Xinchun (黃新淳)	F	Vocal	60	139
Jolin Tsai	The Great Artist	Group B 逆袭的向日葵	Rapen	F	Dance	10	139
Jolin Tsai	The Great Artist	Group B 逆袭的向日葵	Qin Junyi (覃俊毅)	F	Rap	15	139
Hua Chenyu	Codename Contra	Group A 我想换Center	Li Changgeng (李长庚)	D	Vocal	13	171
Hua Chenyu	Codename Contra	Group A 我想换Center	Yu Bin (于斌)	D	Vocal	13	171
Hua Chenyu	Codename Contra	Group A 我想换Center	Ye Hongxi (叶泓希)	C	Vocal	12	171
Hua Chenyu	Codename Contra	Group A 我想换Center	Qiu Zhixie (邱治谐)	C	Vocal	12	171
Hua Chenyu	Codename Contra	Group A 我想换Center	Xu Kaihao (许凯皓)	C	Dance	14	171
Hua Chenyu	Codename Contra	Group A 我想换Center	Lin Yanjun (林彦俊)	D	Rap	101	171
Hua Chenyu	Codename Contra	Group A 我想换Center	Yang Yi (杨羿)	C	Rap	6	171
Hua Chenyu	Codename Contra	Group B 代號氣鼓鼓隊	Yang Feitong (杨非同)	D	Vocal	124	236
Hua Chenyu	Codename Contra	Group B 代號氣鼓鼓隊	Zhu Yiwen (朱一文)	F	Vocal	10	236
Hua Chenyu	Codename Contra	Group B 代號氣鼓鼓隊	Lin Haokai (林浩楷)	F	Vocal	12	236
Hua Chenyu	Codename Contra	Group B 代號氣鼓鼓隊	He Jiageng (何嘉庚)	D	Vocal	17	236
Hua Chenyu	Codename Contra	Group B 代號氣鼓鼓隊	Xu Heni (徐鹤尼)	F	Vocal	25	236
Hua Chenyu	Codename Contra	Group B 代號氣鼓鼓隊	Zhang Yuchen (张宇晨)	D	Rap	25	236
Hua Chenyu	Codename Contra	Group B 代號氣鼓鼓隊	Han Yongjie (韩雍杰)	D	Rap	23	236
Lay Zhang	Shake	Group A 一起摇摆	Gan Jun (甘俊)	D	Vocal	15	87
Lay Zhang	Shake	Group A 一起摇摆	Lou Zibo (娄滋博)	C	Dance	33	87
Lay Zhang	Shake	Group A 一起摇摆	Yue Yue (岳岳)	D	Rap	15	87
Lay Zhang	Shake	Group A 一起摇摆	Zhang Xin (张昕)	C	Rap	10	87
Lay Zhang	Shake	Group A 一起摇摆	Ling Qi (凌崎)	D	Rap	14	87
Lay Zhang	Shake	Group B five fire fly wow visual	Luo Zheng (罗正)	F	Vocal	103	315
Lay Zhang	Shake	Group B five fire fly wow visual	Min Zhexiang (闵喆祥)	C	Dance	54	315
Lay Zhang	Shake	Group B five fire fly wow visual	Zhang Dayuan (张达源)	F	Rap	62	315
Lay Zhang	Shake	Group B five fire fly wow visual	Wang Yilong (王艺龙)	C	Rap	49	315
Lay Zhang	Shake	Group B five fire fly wow visual	He Dongdong (何东东)	F	Rap	47	315
PICO Taro	PPAP	Group A 你的苹果	Zhu Zhengting (朱正廷)	A	Vocal	131	285
PICO Taro	PPAP	Group A 你的苹果	Cai Xukun (蔡徐坤)	A	Vocal	85	285
PICO Taro	PPAP	Group A 你的苹果	Zhou Rui (周锐)	B	Vocal	7	285
PICO Taro	PPAP	Group A 你的苹果	Zhou Yanchen (周彦辰)	B	Dance	32	285
PICO Taro	PPAP	Group A 你的苹果	Wang Ziyi (王子异)	B	Rap	30	285
PICO Taro	PPAP	Group B 扎手的菠萝	Chen Minghao (陈名豪)	F	Vocal	37	146
PICO Taro	PPAP	Group B 扎手的菠萝	Qian Zhenghao (钱正昊)	F	Vocal	32	146
PICO Taro	PPAP	Group B 扎手的菠萝	Li Ruotian (李若天)	F	Vocal	42	146
PICO Taro	PPAP	Group B 扎手的菠萝	Wang Youchen (王宥辰)	F	Dance	13	146
PICO Taro	PPAP	Group B 扎手的菠萝	Chen Yifu (陈义夫)	F	Rap	22	146
Jason Derulo	Get Ugly	Group A 老寒腿组合	Wan Yuxian (万宇贤)	C	Vocal	29	242
Jason Derulo	Get Ugly	Group A 老寒腿组合	Li Zhijie (李志杰)	D	Vocal	22	242
Jason Derulo	Get Ugly	Group A 老寒腿组合	Gao Maotong (高茂桐)	D	Vocal	35	242
Jason Derulo	Get Ugly	Group A 老寒腿组合	Qin Zimo (秦子墨)	F	Vocal	27	242
Jason Derulo	Get Ugly	Group A 老寒腿组合	Wu Lianjie (武連杰)	C	Dance	32	242
Jason Derulo	Get Ugly	Group A 老寒腿组合	Lu Dinghao (陸定昊)	C	Rap	85	242
Jason Derulo	Get Ugly	Group A 老寒腿组合	Li Rang (李让)	D	Rap	12	242
Jason Derulo	Get Ugly	Group B 好难啊组合	Ying Zhiyue (应智越)	C	Vocal	32	144
Jason Derulo	Get Ugly	Group B 好难啊组合	Huang Ruohan (黃若涵)	F	Vocal	8	144
Jason Derulo	Get Ugly	Group B 好难啊组合	Huang Shuhao (黄书豪)	F	Vocal	33	144
Jason Derulo	Get Ugly	Group B 好难啊组合	Li Xinyan (李鑫岩)	F	Vocal	14	144
Jason Derulo	Get Ugly	Group B 好难啊组合	Sun Fanjie (孙凡杰)	D	Dance	16	144
Jason Derulo	Get Ugly	Group B 好难啊组合	Zhang Yankai (张晏恺)	F	Rap	41	144
CNBLUE	Can't Stop	Group A Snow Prince (雪花王子)	Lü Chenyu (呂晨瑜)	F	Vocal	11	258
CNBLUE	Can't Stop	Group A Snow Prince (雪花王子)	You Zhangjing (尤长靖)	A	Vocal	21	258
CNBLUE	Can't Stop	Group A Snow Prince (雪花王子)	Fan Chengcheng (范丞丞)	D	Vocal	99	258
CNBLUE	Can't Stop	Group A Snow Prince (雪花王子)	Zheng Ruibin (郑锐彬)	A	Vocal	14	258
CNBLUE	Can't Stop	Group A Snow Prince (雪花王子)	Deng Langyi (邓烺怡)	C	Dance	8	258
CNBLUE	Can't Stop	Group A Snow Prince (雪花王子)	Lin Chaoze (林超泽)	A	Rap	19	258
CNBLUE	Can't Stop	Group A Snow Prince (雪花王子)	Justin	B	Rap	86	258
CNBLUE	Can't Stop	Group B 七个隆咚呛	Jia Li (伽里)	D	Vocal	11	181
CNBLUE	Can't Stop	Group B 七个隆咚呛	Han Mubo (韩沐伯)	C	Vocal	28	181
CNBLUE	Can't Stop	Group B 七个隆咚呛	Jeffrey	D	Vocal	30	181
CNBLUE	Can't Stop	Group B 七个隆咚呛	Ling Chao (灵超)	D	Vocal	34	181
CNBLUE	Can't Stop	Group B 七个隆咚呛	Wang Zihao (王梓豪)	D	Dance	26	181
CNBLUE	Can't Stop	Group B 七个隆咚呛	Xu Shengen (徐圣恩)	D	Rap	17	181
CNBLUE	Can't Stop	Group B 七个隆咚呛	Qin Fen (秦奋)	F	Rap	35	181

Ranking of Combination confrontation evaluation
	Name	Number of votes
1	Chen Linong (陈立农)	10210
2	Zhu Zhengting (朱正廷)	10131
3	Yang Feitong (杨非同)	10124
4	Luo Zheng (罗正)	10103
5	Fan Chengcheng (范丞丞)	10099
6	Zhu Xingjie (朱星杰)	10087
7	Justin	10086
8	Cai Xukun (蔡徐坤)	10085
9	Lu Dinghao (陸定昊)	10085
10	Li Xikan (李希侃)	10080
11	Zhang Dayuan (张达源)	10062
12	Jiang Jingzuo (姜京佐)	10054
13	Min Zhexiang (闵喆祥)	10054
14	Wang Yilong (王艺龙)	10049
15	He Dongdong (何东东)	10047
16	Zhu Yunyi (朱匀一)	10047
17	Bi Wenjun (毕雯珺)	10044
18	Liang Hui (梁辉)	10042
19	Zhu Yuntian (朱匀天)	10042
20	Bei Honglin (贝汯璘)	10039
21	Yu Mingjun (余明君)	10039
22	Gao Maotong (高茂桐)	10035
23	Wu Lianjie (武連杰)	10032
24	Zhou Yanchen (周彦辰)	10032
25	Wang Ziyi (王子异)	10030
26	Wan Yuxian (万宇贤)	10029
27	Qin Zimo (秦子墨)	10027
28	Xu Heni (徐鶴尼)	10025
29	Zhang Yuchen (张宇晨)	10025
30	Han Yongjie (韩雍杰)	10023
31	Ming Peng (明鵬)	10023
32	Li Zhijie (李志杰)	10022
33	Luo Jie (罗杰)	10021
34	You Zhangjing (尤长靖)	10021
35	Lin Chaoze (林超泽)	10019
36	He Jiageng (何嘉庚)	10017
37	Sun Haoran (孙浩然)	10017
38	Zhang Yixuan (张奕轩)	10016
39	Zheng Ruibin (郑锐彬)	10014
40	Li Rang (李让)	10012
41	Lin Haokai (林浩楷)	10012
42	Zhou Tengyang (周腾阳)	10012
43	Lü Chenyu (呂晨瑜)	10011
44	Zhu Yiwen (朱一文)	10010
45	Deng Langyi (邓烺怡)	10008
46	Zhou Rui (周锐)	10007
47	Jiang Dahe (姜达赫)	10006
48	J-ONE	10004
49	Hou Haoran (侯浩然)	10002
50	Zhang Yifan (张艺凡)	10001
51	Lin Yanjun (林彦俊)	101
52	Huang Xinchun (黃新淳)	60
53	Ding Zeren (丁泽仁)	43
54	Li Ruotian (李若天)	42
55	Zhang Yankai (张晏恺)	41
56	Chen Minghao (陈名豪)	37
57	Chen Siqi (陈斯琪)	37
58	Qin Fen (秦奋)	35
59	Xiao Gui (小鬼)	35
60	Ling Chao (灵超)	34
61	Zhao Yuche (赵俞澈)	34
62	Bu Fan (卜凡)	33
63	Huang Shuhao (黄书豪)	33
64	Lou Zibo (娄滋博)	33
65	Hu Zhibang (胡致邦)	32
66	Qian Zhenghao (钱正昊)	32
67	Ying Zhiyue (应智越)	32
68	Jeffrey	30
69	Jing Peiyao (靖佩瑶)	30
70	Han Mubo (韩沐伯)	28
71	Mu Ziyang (木子洋)	28
72	Wang Zihao (王梓豪)	26
73	Chen Yifu (陈义夫)	22
74	Jin Yihan (金逸涵)	19
75	Li Quanzhe (李权哲)	19
76	Zuo Ye (左叶)	19
77	Xu Shengen (徐圣恩)	17
78	Sun Fanjie (孙凡杰)	16
79	Gan Jun (甘俊)	15
80	Qin Junyi (覃俊毅)	15
81	Yue Yue (岳岳)	15
82	Xu Kaihao (许凯皓)	14
83	Li Xinyan (李鑫岩)	14
84	Ling Qi (凌崎)	14
85	Li Changgeng (李长庚)	13
86	Wang Youchen (王宥辰)	13
87	Yu Bin (于斌)	13
88	Qiu Zhixie (邱治谐)	12
89	Ye Hongxi (叶泓希)	12
90	Jia Li (伽里)	11
91	Li Junyi (李俊毅)	11
92	GIGEL	10
93	Rapen	10
94	Zhang Xin (张昕)	10
95	Zhao Lingfeng (赵凌峰)	10
96	Dong Yanlei (董岩磊)	9
97	Huang Ruohan (黃若涵)	8
98	Yu Hao (于浩)	8
99	Yang Yi (杨羿)	6

=== Episode 5 (February 16) ===
The top 60 trainees with the most votes are announced, starting from rank 59 and announced in groups of ten. After every group of ten, clips of the trainees participating in various activities are shown. Polls among the trainees for the "best visual" and "the person I would most want to introduce to my little sister" were conducted. Taiwanese trainee Lin Yanjun is voted as "best visual" by his fellow trainees. The trainees race against each other to claim presents for the Chinese New Year. The trainees also do a dance battle, dancing to "Ei Ei" at various speeds. Judges Cheng Xiao and Zhou Jieqiong select the winners of the dance battle, who ask that their reward be to let the entire group of trainees go eat Haidilao Hot Pot, a request which the director grants.

Out of the top 9 trainees from voting, ranks 1-7 remain in the same position as last week's episode. Cai Xukun remains as rank 1 with a landslide victory of around 4 million votes against Chen Linong. Liang Hui is revealed to be rank 60, saving himself from elimination by a few thousand votes, demonstrating the importance of the 10,000 bonus votes that were awarded to the winning teams in last week's episode. Jiang Jingzuo is revealed to be rank 61, marking his elimination at the cutline. However he will participate in Youth With You season 3 the next year. The eliminated trainees leave quietly after saying goodbye early the next morning.

E05
Rank	Trainee	Number of Votes
1	Cai Xukun (蔡徐坤)	11,254,646
2	Chen Linong (陈立农)	7,409,638
3	Fan Chengcheng (范丞丞)	6,716,169
4	Justin	6,608,579
5	Zhu Zhengting (朱正廷)	6,539,548
6	Xiao Gui (小鬼)	5,532,434
7	Bu Fan (卜凡)	3,352,131
8	Li Quanzhe (李权哲)	2,456,778
9	He Dongdong (何东东)	2,243,819
10	You Zhangjing (尤长靖)	2,376,682
11	Wang Ziyi (王子异)	2,172,301
12	Jeffrey	2,046,180
13	Qin Fen (秦奋)	1,947,458
14	Lin Chaoze (林超泽)	1,689,966
15	Zhu Xingjie (朱星杰)	1,578,504
16	Ling Chao (灵超)	1,540,972
17	Qian Zhenghao (钱正昊)	1,442,197
18	Dong Yanlei (董岩磊)	1,406,106
19	Han Mubo (韩木伯)	1,335,746
20	Ding Zeren (丁泽仁)	1,178,626
21	Yue Yue (岳岳)	1,043,108
22	Zuo Ye (左叶)	1,040,536
23	Xu Kaihao (许凯皓)	988,816
24	Mu Ziyang (木子样)	910,613
25	Zheng Ruibin (郑锐彬)	865,664
26	Bi Wenjun (毕雯珺)	836,793
27	Zhou Yanchen (周彦辰)	662,933
28	Lin Yanjun (林彦俊)	622,535
29	Li Xikan (李希侃)	613,799
30	Lu Dinghao (陆定昊)	576,286
31	Zhou Rui (周锐)	551,319
32	Huang Shuhao (黄书豪)	538,020
33	Huang Xinchun (黄新淳)	526,612
34	Luo Zheng (罗正)	507,427
35	Zhang Dayuan (张大源)	505,441
36	Li Rang (李让)	480,187
37	Bei Honglin (贝汯璘)	479,443
38	Li Changgeng (李长庚)	416,274
39	Chen Siqi (陈斯琪)	378,569
40	Han Yongjie (韩雍杰)	365,269
41	Qin Zimo (秦子墨)	Unreleased
42	Wu Lianjie (武連杰)	Unreleased
43	Qin Junyi (覃俊毅)	Unreleased
44	Lou Zibo (娄滋博)	Unreleased
45	Jing Peiyao (靖佩瑶)	Unreleased
46	Yu Mingjun (余明君)	Unreleased
47	Chen Minghao (陈明豪)	Unreleased
48	Ming Peng (明鹏)	Unreleased
49	Yang Feitong (杨非同)	Unreleased
50	Zhu Yunyi (朱匀一)	Unreleased
51	Jia Li (伽里)	252,504
52	Ling Qi (凌崎)	248,425
53	Zhu Yuntian (朱匀天)	247,763
54	Xu Shengen (徐圣恩)	243,715
55	Li Junyi (李俊毅)	229,038
56	Zhang Yixuan (张奕轩)	228,027
57	Wang Yilong (王艺龙)	227,256
58	Jiang Dahe (姜达赫)	223,613
59	Hu Zhibang (胡致邦)	221,892
60	Liang Hui (梁辉)	215,084

=== Episode 6 (February 23) ===
The trainees begin their position evaluation group performances, with trainees selecting songs that can showcase their specialties in the vocal, dance, or rap categories. There are five songs for the vocal category: (Ed Sheeran's "Shape of You", Stefanie Sun's《我怀念的》(What I Miss), Chen Li's 《小半》(Little Half), Kimberley Chen's 《爱你》 (Love You), and "Always Online" by JJ Lin); four songs for the dance category ("Me Too", "Sheep" by Zhang Yixing, "Flow" by Khalil Fong ft. Wang Leehom, and Jay Chou's《双节棍》(Nunchuks)); and four songs for the rap category ("Very Good", "Turn Down for What", "Artist" by Zico and Papillon by Jackson Wang). The trainees with higher rankings pick their songs first, and once the chosen song reaches its member limit, the later trainees can no longer pick that song. The trainees' accumulated votes are reset to zero for this third challenge. The most possible votes that a trainee could earn from this challenge is 150,000, with the winning members of each winning group gaining 50,000 votes, and an extra 100,000 votes to the winning trainee in each category. The trainees from rank 36-60 after the second round of online voting at the end of this challenge will be eliminated.

Judges Jackson Wang and MC Jin provide mentorship to the trainees in an informal Q&A session. The trainees pick their songs in order of rank. Grouped by songs, the trainees in each group choose a center and a leader. Judges Cheng Xiao and Zhou Jieqiong provide dance advice. Trainee and Leader of "Nunchucks" Zhou Yanchen, who has been practicing late into the night, collapses at the end of the dress rehearsal due to hypoglycemia. The "《双节棍》(Nunchucks)", "Artist", "《我怀念的》(What I Miss)", and "Turn Down for What" groups perform, and their rehearsal experiences are shown. The "Papillon" group prepares to perform.

Color key

- Center
- Leader
- Leader and Center
- Top of the Category

E06
Type	Performance Song	Original singer	Group Name	Name	Rank within the group	Number of Votes
Dance	Nunchucks	Jay Chou	The Shadows (769)	Ding Zeren (丁泽仁)	1	339
Dance	Nunchucks	Jay Chou	The Shadows (769)	Zhou Yanchen (周彦辰)	2	146
Dance	Nunchucks	Jay Chou	The Shadows (769)	Hu Zhibang (胡致邦)	3	95
Dance	Nunchucks	Jay Chou	The Shadows (769)	Zhang Yixuan (张奕轩)	4	70
Dance	Nunchucks	Jay Chou	The Shadows (769)	Yu Mingjun (余明君)	5	59
Dance	Nunchucks	Jay Chou	The Shadows (769)	Ling Qi (凌崎)	6	34
Dance	Nunchucks	Jay Chou	The Shadows (769)	Jiang Dahe (姜达赫)	7	26
Rap	Artist	ZICO	Auto-tune (781)	Xiao Gui (小鬼)	1	328
Rap	Artist	ZICO	Auto-tune (781)	Yue Yue (岳岳)	2	174
Rap	Artist	ZICO	Auto-tune (781)	Zhu Xingjie (朱星杰)	3	166
Rap	Artist	ZICO	Auto-tune (781)	Xu Shengen (徐圣恩)	4	113
Vocal	我怀念的	Stefanie Sun	下雨天 (886)	You Zhangjing (尤长靖)	1	300
Vocal	我怀念的	Stefanie Sun	下雨天 (886)	Li Quanzhe (李权哲)	2	295
Vocal	我怀念的	Stefanie Sun	下雨天 (886)	Han Mubo (韩木伯)	3	176
Vocal	我怀念的	Stefanie Sun	下雨天 (886)	Chen Linong (陈立农)	4	115
Rap	Turn down for what	DJ Snake	真不容易队 (565)	Qin Fen (秦奋)	1	248
Rap	Turn down for what	DJ Snake	真不容易队 (565)	Dong Yanlei (董岩磊)	3	95
Rap	Turn down for what	DJ Snake	真不容易队 (565)	Li Rang (李让)	4	59
Rap	Turn down for what	DJ Snake	真不容易队 (565)	Jing Peiyao (靖佩瑶)	2	163

=== Episode 7 (March 2) ===
The trainees continue the position evaluation group performances with "Sheep" (Dance, Lay), "Loving You" (Vocal, Kimberley Chen), "Very Good" (Rap), and "Flow" (Dance), in which Center Zhu Yunyi suffered an eye injury during dance rehearsal at midnight of the live performance when his belt hit his right contact lens and temporarily blinded him due to hyphema. He had to stay in the green room during the performance, while his twin brother Zhu Yuntian and his teammates performed without him. Zhu Yuntian ended up getting first. "Little Half/Xiao Ban" (Vocal, Chen Li) Team, "Me Too" (Dance, Meaghan Trainor, composed of lower-ranked vocalists) also performed. The winners of each performance and the winners of each category are revealed.

E07
Type	Performance Song	Original singer	Group Name	Name	Rank within group	Number of Votes
Dance	Sheep	Lay Zhang	小绵羊 (739)	Zhu Zhengting (朱正廷)	1	351
Dance	Sheep	Lay Zhang	小绵羊 (739)	Lin Chaoze (林超泽)	3	112
Dance	Sheep	Lay Zhang	小绵羊 (739)	Li Xikan (李希侃)	2	136
Dance	Sheep	Lay Zhang	小绵羊 (739)	Zuo Ye (左叶)	4	53
Dance	Sheep	Lay Zhang	小绵羊 (739)	Xu Kaihao (许凯皓)	5	49
Dance	Sheep	Lay Zhang	小绵羊 (739)	Wu Lianjie (武連杰)	6	38
Vocal	爱你	Kimberley Chen	每天都是情人节 (717)	Huang Xinchun (黄新淳)	1	231
Vocal	爱你	Kimberley Chen	每天都是情人节 (717)	Lin Yanjun (林彦俊)	2	219
Vocal	爱你	Kimberley Chen	每天都是情人节 (717)	Jeffrey	3	160
Vocal	爱你	Kimberley Chen	每天都是情人节 (717)	Lu Dinghao (陆定昊)	4	107
Rap	Very good	Block B	Very good team (595)	Fan Chengcheng (范丞丞)	1	368
Rap	Very good	Block B	Very good team (595)	Li Junyi (李俊毅)	2	98
Rap	Very good	Block B	Very good team (595)	Qin Junyi (覃俊毅)	3	69
Rap	Very good	Block B	Very good team (595)	Bei Honglin (贝汯璘)	4	60
Dance	Flow	Khalil Fong ft. Wang Leehom	红红火火 (461)	Zhu Yuntian (朱匀天)	1	227
Dance	Flow	Khalil Fong ft. Wang Leehom	红红火火 (461)	Wang Yilong (王艺龙)	2	128
Dance	Flow	Khalil Fong ft. Wang Leehom	红红火火 (461)	Liang Hui (梁辉)	3	106
Dance	Flow	Khalil Fong ft. Wang Leehom	红红火火 (461)	Zhu Yunyi (朱匀一)	Due to injury can not participate in performances	
Vocal	小半	Chen Li	冻坏你们 (1020)	Zhou Rui (周锐)	1	293
Vocal	小半	Chen Li	冻坏你们 (1020)	Zheng Ruibin (郑锐彬)	2	250
Vocal	小半	Chen Li	冻坏你们 (1020)	Ling Chao (灵超)	3	248
Vocal	小半	Chen Li	冻坏你们 (1020)	Qian Zhenghao (钱正昊)	4	229
Dance	Me too	Meghan Trainor	如果我是你，我也想成为自己队 (549)	Lou Zibo (娄滋博)	1	197
Dance	Me too	Meghan Trainor	如果我是你，我也想成为自己队 (549)	Qin Zimo (秦子墨)	2	142
Dance	Me too	Meghan Trainor	如果我是你，我也想成为自己队 (549)	Yang Feitong (杨非同)	3	110
Dance	Me too	Meghan Trainor	如果我是你，我也想成为自己队 (549)	Zhang Dayuan (张达源)	4	54
Dance	Me too	Meghan Trainor	如果我是你，我也想成为自己队 (549)	Jia Li (伽里)	5	46
Vocal	Shape of you	Ed Sheeran	I want you (502)	Chen Minghao (陈明豪)	1	127
Vocal	Shape of you	Ed Sheeran	I want you (502)	Li Changgeng (李长庚)	2	119
Vocal	Shape of you	Ed Sheeran	I want you (502)	Han Yongjie (韩雍杰)	3	94
Vocal	Shape of you	Ed Sheeran	I want you (502)	Ming Peng (明鹏)	4	86
Vocal	Shape of you	Ed Sheeran	I want you (502)	Chen Siqi (陈斯琪)	5	76
Vocal	Always Online	JJ Lin	High fashion (767)	Bi Wenjun (毕雯珺)	1	300
Vocal	Always Online	JJ Lin	High fashion (767)	Mu Ziyang	2	199
Vocal	Always Online	JJ Lin	High fashion (767)	Luo Zheng (罗正)	3	124
Vocal	Always Online	JJ Lin	High fashion (767)	Huang Shuhao (黄书豪)	4	97
Vocal	Always Online	JJ Lin	High fashion (767)	He Dongdong (何东东)	5	47
Rap	Papillon	Jackson Wang	台下Baby龙 台上巴比龙 (885)	Justin	1	285
Rap	Papillon	Jackson Wang	台下Baby龙 台上巴比龙 (885)	Cai Xukun (蔡徐坤)	2	271
Rap	Papillon	Jackson Wang	台下Baby龙 台上巴比龙 (885)	Bu Fan (卜凡)	3	186
Rap	Papillon	Jackson Wang	台下Baby龙 台上巴比龙 (885)	Wang Ziyi (王子异)	4	143

Color Key

- Top of Each Category
- Top of Each Group

Ranking of Position evaluation (Only Dance)
Name	Ranking	Number of Votes
Zhu Zhengting (朱正廷)	1	150,351
Ding Zeren (丁泽仁)	2	50,339
Zhu Yuntian (朱勻天)	3	50,227
Lou Zibo (娄滋博)	4	50,191
Zhou Yanchen (周彥辰)	5	146
Qin Zimo (秦子墨)	6	142
Li Xikan (李希侃)	7	136
Wang Yilong (王艺龙)	8	128
Lin Chaoze (林超泽)	9	112
Yang Feitong (杨非同)	10	110
Liang Hui (梁辉)	11	106
Hu Zhibang (胡致邦)	12	95
Zhang Yixuan (张奕轩)	13	70
Yu Mingjun (余明君)	14	59
Zhang Dayuan (张达源)	15	54
Zuo Ye (左叶)	16	53
Xu Kaihao (许凯皓)	17	49
Jia Li (伽里)	18	46
Wu Lianjie (武連杰)	19	38
Ling Qi (凌崎)	20	34
Jiang Dahe (姜达赫)	21	26
Zhu Yunyi (朱勻一)	22	0

Ranking of Position evaluation (Only Vocal)
Name	Ranking	Number of Votes
You Zhangjing (尤长靖)	1	150,300
Bi Wenjun (毕雯珺)	1	150,300
Zhou Rui (周锐)	3	50,293
Huang Xinchun (黄新淳)	4	50,231
Chen Minghao (陈名豪)	5	50,127
Li Quanzhe (李权哲)	6	295
Zheng Ruibin (郑锐彬)	7	250
Ling Chao (灵超)	8	248
Qian Zhenghao (钱正昊)	9	229
Lin Yanjun (林彥俊)	10	219
Mu Ziyang (木子洋)	11	199
Han Mubo (韩沐伯)	12	176
Jeffrey	13	160
Luo Zheng (罗正)	14	124
Li Chenggeng (李长庚)	15	119
Chen Linong (陈立农)	16	115
Lu Dinghao (陆定昊)	17	107
Huang Shuhao (黄书豪)	18	97
Han Yongjie (韩雍杰)	19	94
Ming Peng (明鹏)	20	86
Chen Siqi (陈斯琪)	21	76
He Dongdong (何东东)	22	47

Ranking of Position evaluation(Only Rap)
Name	Ranking	Number of Votes
Fan Chengcheng (范丞丞)	1	150,368
Xiao Gui (小鬼)	2	50,328
Justin	3	50,285
Qin Fen (秦奋)	4	50,248
Cai Xukun (蔡徐坤)	5	271
Bu Fan (卜凡)	6	186
Yue Yue (岳岳)	7	174
Zhu Xingjie (朱星杰)	8	166
Jing Peiyao (靖佩瑶)	9	163
Wang Ziyi (王子异)	10	143
Xu Shengen (徐圣恩)	11	113
Lu Junyi (李俊毅)	12	98
Dong Yanlei (董岩磊)	13	95
Qin Junyi (覃俊毅)	14	69
Bei Honglin (贝汯璘)	15	60
Li Rang (李让)	16	59

Ranking of Position evaluation
Name	Ranking	Number of Votes
Fan Chengcheng (范丞丞)	1	150,368
Zhu Zhengting (朱正廷)	2	150,351
You Zhangjing (尤长靖)	3	150,300
Bi Wenjun (毕雯珺)	3	150,300
Ding Zeren (丁泽仁)	5	50,339
Xiao Gui (小鬼)	6	50,328
Zhou Rui (周锐)	7	50,293
Justin	8	50,285
Qin Fen (秦奋)	9	50,248
Huang Xinchun (黄新淳)	10	50,231
Zhu Yuntian (朱勻天)	11	50,227
Lou Zibo (娄滋博)	12	50,191
Chen Minghao (陈名豪)	13	50,127
Li Quanzhe (李权哲)	14	295
Cai Xukun (蔡徐坤)	15	271
Zheng Ruibin (郑锐彬)	16	250
Ling Chao (灵超)	17	248
Qian Zhenghao (钱正昊)	18	229
Lin Yanjun (林彥俊)	19	219
Mu Ziyang (木子洋)	20	199
Bu Fan (卜凡)	21	186
Han Mubo (韩沐伯)	22	176
Yue Yue (岳岳)	23	174
Zhu Xingjie (朱星杰)	24	166
Jing Peiyao (靖佩瑶)	25	163
Jeffrey	26	160
Zhou Yanchen (周彥辰)	27	146
Wang Ziyi (王子异)	28	143
Qin Zimo (秦子墨)	29	142
Li Xikan (李希侃)	30	136
Wang Yilong (王艺龙)	31	128
Luo Zheng (罗正)	32	124
Li Changgeng (李长庚)	33	119
Chen Linong (陈立农)	34	115
Xu Shengen (徐圣恩)	35	113
Lin Chaoze (林超泽)	36	112
Yang Feitong (杨非同)	37	110
Lu Dinghao (陆定昊)	38	107
Liang Hui (梁辉)	39	106
Li Junyi (李俊毅)	40	98
Huang Shuhao (黄书豪)	41	97
Dong Yanlei (董岩磊)	42	95
Hu Zhibang (胡致邦)	42	95
Han Yongjie (韩雍杰)	44	94
Ming Peng (明鹏)	45	86
Chen Siqi (陈斯琪)	46	76
Zhang Yixuan (张奕轩)	47	70
Qin Junyi (覃俊毅)	48	69
Bei Honglin (贝汯璘)	49	60
Li Rang (李让)	50	59
Yu Mingjun (余明君)	50	59
Zhang Dayuan (张达源)	52	54
Zuo Ye (左叶)	53	53
Xu Kaihao (许凯皓)	54	49
He Dongdong (何东东)	55	47
Jia Li (伽里)	56	46
Wu Lianjie (武連杰)	57	38
Ling Qi (凌崎)	58	34
Jiang Dahe (姜达赫)	59	26
Zhu Yunyi (朱勻一)	60	0

=== Episode 8 (March 9) ===
The day after the Position Evaluations, Zhang Yixing provides his own Q&A session and shared his own experiences as a trainee, and how his agency's system differs from Idol Producer's system, like a 3-hour-only hire on practice rooms where you must sign for time slots, and the meals must be pre-ordered in the SM cafeteria. He also shared a change in mentality after debut. A day later, he revealed via video conference call that the next mission is the Concept Evaluation, where the trainees, as chosen by Idol Producers, will become the original singers to 5 original songs of different styles and concepts. However, the elimination to top 35 will occur midway through the preparation, meaning the final number of each group will be 5 groups of 7 (from 12). If a team is somehow wiped out after the midpoint cuts, the team will be rearranged in later episodes. The voting system also changes. First, the live audience pick the team that performs the best, then from that winning team, the trainee who performs the best will be picked. Each member of the winning team gains a pool of 500,000 votes, of which, the trainee that is the best of the best gets an extra 200000 votes, while the rest gain 50000 each. The five songs are "Firewalking" (Tropical House with chair dances), "Boom Boom Boom" (R&B), "Listen to What I Say (听听我说的吧)" (Hip hop), "I Will Always Remember (我永远记得)" (Pop ballad with soul), and Dream (Hip hop with dance points). In the initial stage, the group of 12 is split into 2 groups of 6, with 2 temporary centers and a temporary leader. Zhu Yunyi has recovered from hyphema, and Zhou Yanchen has recovered from fainting from hypoglycemia for the practices for the new missions. On the morning of the reveal of the top 35, they write their final diary entries, which also serve as letters of gratitude to the mentors. Due to the longer voting periods including bonus votes added, over 255 million votes were received. He Dongdong plummets from 9th to 33rd over the last 3 weeks of voting, but still gained over 1.7 million votes. Cai Xukun retained his no.1 spot, while Li Junyi unofficially released his self-written song "The Greatest Dream" before he was eliminated.

Color Key

- Center
- Leader
- Leader and Center

E08
Lists of Concept Evaluation (before unadjusted)
Room	Type	Song	Group	Name
1	R&B	《Boom Boom Boom》	1	He Dongdong (何东东)
1	R&B	《Boom Boom Boom》	1	Chen Siqi (陈斯琪)
1	R&B	《Boom Boom Boom》	1	Zhang Yixuan (张奕轩)
1	R&B	《Boom Boom Boom》	1	Lu Dinghao (陆定昊)
1	R&B	《Boom Boom Boom》	1	Wang Yilong (王艺龙)
1	R&B	《Boom Boom Boom》	1	Luo Zheng (罗正)
1	R&B	《Boom Boom Boom》	2	Lou Zibo (娄滋博)
1	R&B	《Boom Boom Boom》	2	Ling Qi (凌崎)
1	R&B	《Boom Boom Boom》	2	Qin Junyi (覃俊毅)
1	R&B	《Boom Boom Boom》	2	Huang Xinchun (黄新淳)
1	R&B	《Boom Boom Boom》	2	Huang Shuhao (黄书豪)
1	R&B	《Boom Boom Boom》	2	Dong Yanlei (董岩磊)
2	Hip Hop	《Dream》	1	Zhu Xingjie (朱星杰)
2	Hip Hop	《Dream》	1	Zhu Zhengting (朱正廷)
2	Hip Hop	《Dream》	1	Zhou Yanchen (周彦辰)
2	Hip Hop	《Dream》	1	Fan Chengcheng (范丞丞)
2	Hip Hop	《Dream》	1	Ding Zeren (丁泽仁)
2	Hip Hop	《Dream》	1	Justin
2	Hip Hop	《Dream》	2	Zheng Ruibin (郑锐彬)
2	Hip Hop	《Dream》	2	Li Rang (李让)
2	Hip Hop	《Dream》	2	Qian Zhenghao (钱正昊)
2	Hip Hop	《Dream》	2	Wang Ziyi (王子异)
2	Hip Hop	《Dream》	2	Cai Xukun (蔡徐坤)
2	Hip Hop	《Dream》	2	Chen Minghao (陈明豪)
3	Tropical House	《Firewalking》	1	Chen Linong (陈立农)
3	Tropical House	《Firewalking》	1	Lin Yanjun (林彦俊)
3	Tropical House	《Firewalking》	1	Lin Chaoze (林超泽)
3	Tropical House	《Firewalking》	1	Zuo Ye (左叶)
3	Tropical House	《Firewalking》	1	Xu Kaihao (许凯皓)
3	Tropical House	《Firewalking》	1	Ling Chao (灵超)
3	Tropical House	《Firewalking》	2	Li Quanzhe (李权哲)
3	Tropical House	《Firewalking》	2	Yue Yue (岳岳)
3	Tropical House	《Firewalking》	2	Qin Fen (秦奋)
3	Tropical House	《Firewalking》	2	Li Xikan (李希侃)
3	Tropical House	《Firewalking》	2	Mu Ziyang (木子样)
3	Tropical House	《Firewalking》	2	Yu Mingjun (余明君)
4	Hip Hop	Listen To What I Say 《听听我说的吧》	1	Bei Honglin (贝汯璘)
4	Hip Hop	Listen To What I Say 《听听我说的吧》	1	Zhu Yunyi (朱匀一)
4	Hip Hop	Listen To What I Say 《听听我说的吧》	1	Zhu Yuntian (朱匀天)
4	Hip Hop	Listen To What I Say 《听听我说的吧》	1	Ming Peng (明鹏)
4	Hip Hop	Listen To What I Say 《听听我说的吧》	1	Wu Lianjie (武連杰)
4	Hip Hop	Listen To What I Say 《听听我说的吧》	2	Xu Shengen (徐圣恩)
4	Hip Hop	Listen To What I Say 《听听我说的吧》	2	Bu Fan (卜凡)
4	Hip Hop	Listen To What I Say 《听听我说的吧》	2	Xiao Gui (小鬼)
4	Hip Hop	Listen To What I Say 《听听我说的吧》	2	Qin Zimo (秦子墨)
4	Hip Hop	Listen To What I Say 《听听我说的吧》	2	Jia Li (伽里)
5	POP	I Will Always Remember《我永远记得》	1	Jeffrey
5	POP	I Will Always Remember《我永远记得》	1	Han Mubo (韩木伯)
5	POP	I Will Always Remember《我永远记得》	1	You Zhangjing (尤长靖)
5	POP	I Will Always Remember《我永远记得》	1	Jing Peiyao (靖佩瑶)
5	POP	I Will Always Remember《我永远记得》	1	Han Yongjie (韩雍杰)
5	POP	I Will Always Remember《我永远记得》	1	Li Changgeng (李长庚)
5	POP	I Will Always Remember《我永远记得》	2	Li Junyi (李俊毅)
5	POP	I Will Always Remember《我永远记得》	2	Bi Wenjun (毕雯珺)
5	POP	I Will Always Remember《我永远记得》	2	Yang Feitong (杨非同)
5	POP	I Will Always Remember《我永远记得》	2	Zhou Rui (周锐)
5	POP	I Will Always Remember《我永远记得》	2	Hu Zhibang (胡致邦)
5	POP	I Will Always Remember《我永远记得》	2	Zhang Dayuan (张达源)

E08
Rank	Trainee	Number of Votes
1	Cai Xukun (蔡徐坤)	22,819,925
2	Justin	20,287,719
3	Fan Chengcheng (范丞丞)	18,453,678
4	Zhu Zhengting (朱正廷)	17,848,559
5	Chen Linong (陈立农)	16,757,389
6	Xiao Gui (小鬼)	12,201,426
7	Wang Ziyi (王子异)	11,951,835
8	You Zhangjing (尤长靖)	11,794,119
9	Ling Chao (灵超)	9,499,151
10	Bu Fan (卜凡)	9,190,239
11	Qin Fen (秦奋)	8,948,637
12	Li Quanzhe (李权哲)	8,663,416
13	Zhu Xingjie (朱星杰)	5,704,565
14	Zhou Yanchen (周彦辰)	5,622,830
15	Jeffrey	5,471,493
16	Lin Chaoze (林超泽)	5,048,276
17	Li Xikan (李希侃)	4,366,313
18	Yue Yue (岳岳)	3,698,434
19	Ding Zeren (丁泽仁)	3,454,002
20	Mu Ziyang (木子样)	2,774,054
21	Han Mubo (韩木伯)	2,711,723
22	Lin Yanjun (林彦俊)	2,622,836
23	Zhou Rui (周锐)	2,600,068
24	Luo Zheng (罗正)	2,437,643
25	Zheng Ruibin (郑锐彬)	2,357,454
26	Qian Zhenghao (钱正昊)	2,329,402
27	Bi Wenjun (毕雯珺)	2,207,760
28	Xu Shengen (徐圣恩)	2,090,753
29	Huang Xinchun (黄新淳)	1,965,047
30	Yang Feitong (杨非同)	1,940,083
31	Lu Dinghao (陆定昊)	1,940,057
32	Lou Zibo (娄滋博)	1,856,060
33	He Dongdong (何东东)	1,798,828
34	Yu Mingjun (余明君)	1,772,933
35	Li Rang (李让)	1,768,074

=== Episode 9 (March 16) ===
After the top 35 were revealed, the teams within each song are readjusted. At the end of this evaluation, the top 20 trainees will enter the final evaluation to determine the Final 9 members that would debut. The team members for the Concept evaluations are being readjusted. Conversely, The "Firewalking" group had to drop 3 people (from 10 people remaining), the "Dream" team must drop 4 members (from 11), "Boom Boom Boom" group will add 2 people (from the 5 remaining). I Will Always Remember group has to add one person (from the 6 remaining members) from the pool of eliminated members from the 'excess' group. The group with excess members must conduct internal voting to determine the members that would be waived off. The members least suitable to perform the original song would be released, then would be picked as free agents from the team needing to add members. Since "Listen to What I Have to Say" Group was decimated by the latest round of eliminations, with only three of the original 12 members left in the group, it added extra burden and frustration on leader Bu Fan because the original members' choreography and singing parts also needed to change with the adjustments. In the Firewalking group, Yue Yue and Qin Fen, being the oldest members in the original group, have suffered lower back issues, and are at risk of being waived, which they did. The risk of being in free agency is the same as the group with few original members, they must completely relearn a different song from scratch with less time.

For the team that needs to gain free agents, the team member with the highest individual rankings get higher picks to pick all members from the pool, which would be Xiao Gui (6th as of week 7) picking 4 members, You Zhangjing (8th) would pick a member, with the rest moving to "Boom Boom Boom" group by default.

The live voting system: Each audience has two votes. After all of the songs are performed, One for the team that performs the best, the other is for the team member from that group that is 'best of the best'. with both votes must be towards the same team. The team members of the best team will add a pool of 500,000 votes, and the best member will get 200,000 of the 500,000 votes, with the rest get an equal share of 50,000 votes. After all of the performances were complete, the top two trainees from the top 2 group are left unrevealed, which were Justin vs. Cai Xukun again. Their result won't be revealed until the 3rd ranking announcement, which would also be the elimination to the Top 20.

Color Key

- Center
- Leader
- Leader and Center
- Moved Into the Group

E09
Lists of Concept Evaluation (adjusted)
Type	Song	Group Name	Name	Number of Personal Votes	Number of Group Votes
Tropical House	《Firewalking》	十二分之七	Chen Linong (陈立农)	54	151
Tropical House	《Firewalking》	十二分之七	Lin Yanjun (林彦俊)	31	151
Tropical House	《Firewalking》	十二分之七	Lin Chaoze (林超泽)	4	151
Tropical House	《Firewalking》	十二分之七	Ling Chao (灵超)	22	151
Tropical House	《Firewalking》	十二分之七	Li Quanzhe (李权哲)	9	151
Tropical House	《Firewalking》	十二分之七	Mu Ziyang (木子样)	27	151
Tropical House	《Firewalking》	十二分之七	Yu Mingjun (余明君)	4	151
Hip Hop	《Dream》	果然扭秧歌的乐华	Zhu Xingjie (朱星杰)	19	234
Hip Hop	《Dream》	果然扭秧歌的乐华	Zhu Zhengting (朱正廷)	64	234
Hip Hop	《Dream》	果然扭秧歌的乐华	Zhou Yanchen (周彦辰)	10	234
Hip Hop	《Dream》	果然扭秧歌的乐华	Fan Chengcheng (范丞丞)	35	234
Hip Hop	《Dream》	果然扭秧歌的乐华	Ding Zeren (丁泽仁)	19	234
Hip Hop	《Dream》	果然扭秧歌的乐华	Justin	79	234
Hip Hop	《Dream》	果然扭秧歌的乐华	Qian Zhenghao (钱正昊)	8	234
POP	《我永远记得》(I will always remember)	Never Forget	Jeffrey	14	107
POP	《我永远记得》(I will always remember)	Never Forget	Han Mubo (韩木伯)	8	107
POP	《我永远记得》(I will always remember)	Never Forget	You Zhangjing (尤长靖)	23	107
POP	《我永远记得》(I will always remember)	Never Forget	Bi Wenjun (毕雯珺)	16	107
POP	《我永远记得》(I will always remember)	Never Forget	Yang Feitong (杨非同)	7	107
POP	《我永远记得》(I will always remember)	Never Forget	Zhou Rui (周锐)	12	107
POP	《我永远记得》(I will always remember)	Never Forget	Wang Ziyi (王子异)	27	107
R&B	《Boom Boom Boom》	心跳猎手	He Dongdong (何东东)	1	47
R&B	《Boom Boom Boom》	心跳猎手	Lu Dinghao (陆定昊)	7	47
R&B	《Boom Boom Boom》	心跳猎手	Luo Zheng (罗正)	6	47
R&B	《Boom Boom Boom》	心跳猎手	Lou Zibo (娄滋博)	6	47
R&B	《Boom Boom Boom》	心跳猎手	Huang Xinchun (黄新淳)	5	47
R&B	《Boom Boom Boom》	心跳猎手	Yue Yue (岳岳)	14	47
R&B	《Boom Boom Boom》	心跳猎手	Li Rang (李让)	8	47
Hip Hop	《听听我说的吧》(Listen to what I say)	七龙珠	Xu Shengen (徐圣恩)	4	256
Hip Hop	《听听我说的吧》(Listen to what I say)	七龙珠	Bu Fan (卜凡)	19	256
Hip Hop	《听听我说的吧》(Listen to what I say)	七龙珠	Xiao Gui (小鬼)	24	256
Hip Hop	《听听我说的吧》(Listen to what I say)	七龙珠	Zheng Ruibin (郑锐彬)	16	256
Hip Hop	《听听我说的吧》(Listen to what I say)	七龙珠	Cai Xukun (蔡徐坤)	157	256
Hip Hop	《听听我说的吧》(Listen to what I say)	七龙珠	Qin Fen (秦奋)	13	256
Hip Hop	《听听我说的吧》(Listen to what I say)	七龙珠	Li Xikan (李希侃)	23	256

Ranking of Concept Evaluation
Name	Number of Personal Votes	Number of Personal Votes(Final)
Cai Xukun (蔡徐坤)	157	200,157
Justin	79	79
Zhu Zhengting (朱正廷)	64	64
Chen Linong (陈立农)	54	54
Fan Chengcheng (范丞丞)	35	35
Lin Yanjun (林彦俊)	31	31
Mu Ziyang (木子样)	27	27
Wang Ziyi (王子异)	27	27
Xiao Gui (小鬼)	24	50,024
You Zhangjing (尤长靖)	23	23
Li Xikan (李希侃)	23	50,023
Ling Chao (灵超)	22	22
Zhu Xingjie (朱星杰)	19	19
Ding Zeren (丁泽仁)	19	19
Bu Fan (卜凡)	19	50,019
Bi Wenjun (毕雯珺)	16	16
Zheng Ruibin (郑锐彬)	16	50,016
Yue Yue (岳岳)	14	14
Jeffrey	14	14
Qin Fen (秦奋)	13	50,013
Zhou Rui (周锐)	12	12
Zhou Yanchen (周彦辰)	10	10
Li Quanzhe (李权哲)	9	9
Qian Zhenghao (钱正昊)	8	8
Li Rang (李让)	8	8
Han Mubo (韩木伯)	8	8
Lu Dinghao (陆定昊)	7	7
Yang Feitong (杨非同)	7	7
Lou Zibo (娄滋博)	6	6
Luo Zheng (罗正)	6	6
Huang Xinchun (黄新淳)	5	5
Lin Chaoze (林超泽)	4	4
Yu Mingjun (余明君)	4	4
Xu Shengen (徐圣恩)	4	50,004
He Dongdong (何东东)	1	1

=== Episode 10 (March 23) ===
Before the Top 20 announcements, the mentors all wrote a letter to the trainees, expressing their thoughts. This is the third and final ranking announcement, with the top 5 spots remaining the same from the previous elimination round.

The Top 20 would have 18 days (on April 6, 2018) to prepare the live broadcast, which is the final episode to determine the 9 members of the new boy group. The voting will include internet votes before voting plus the live voting on the night of the live broadcast. There would be two songs: "It's OK" (Pop) and Mack Daddy (Hip Hop). Unlike other "drafts", the trainees with the lowest rankings get first pick to choose the song AND their preferred role, but the trainees in the higher ranks can knock the member occupying the preferred role off the spot, but can only be done once.

The third and final round of elimination occurs, with the trainees ranked 21-35 leaving the show, but only after the collaboration stages with the mentors, which is screened in episode 11. Cai Xukun retains his top position, with Zheng Ruibin being ranked as 20th. Zhou Yanchen, as 21st, is unfortunately eliminated.

Clips of trainees participating in various activities are also screened in this episode, such as playing musical chairs wearing inflatable suits. They also devise a ghost prank behind a two-way mirror, which frightens several trainees but fails at some. Another segment involves them being given the opportunity to 吐槽，or to expose other trainees in their daily life, such as Wang Ziyi's "Hey bro."

E10
Rank	Trainee
1	Cai Xukun (蔡徐坤)
2	Chen Linong (陈立农)
3	Fan Chengcheng (范丞丞)
4	Justin
5	Wang Ziyi (王子异)
6	Xiao Gui (小鬼)
7	Zhu Zhengting (朱正廷)
8	You Zhangjing (尤长靖)
9	Bu Fan (卜凡)
10	Qian Zhenghao (钱正昊)
11	Lin Yanjun (林彦俊)
12	Bi Wenjun (毕雯珺)
13	Ling Chao (灵超)
14	Zhu Xingjie (朱星杰)
15	Lin Chaoze (林超泽)
16	Jeffrey
17	Qin Fen (秦奋)
18	Li Xikan (李希侃)
19	Xu Shengen (徐圣恩)
20	Zheng Ruibin (郑锐彬)
21	Zhou Yanchen (周彦辰)
22	Mu Ziyang (木子样)
23	Li Quanzhe (李权哲)
24	Han Mubo (韩木伯)
25	Zhou Rui (周锐)
26	Ding Zeren (丁泽仁)
27	Yue Yue (岳岳)
28	Yang Feitong (杨非同)
29	Lou Zibo (娄滋博)
30	Luo Zheng (罗正)
31	Lu Dinghao (陆定昊)
32	Huang Xinchun (黄新淳)
33	He Dongdong (何东东)
34	Li Rang (李让)
35	Yu Mingjun (余明君)

=== Episode 11 (March 30) ===
Before the new set of evaluation, special guest instructor Jolin Tsai gave the remaining contestants some advice on facing criticisms and comments, especially from social media (primarily Weibo), and self evaluation and reflection.

This episode showcases the collaboration stage of the trainees with the mentors. The top 9 of the previous eliminations get to pick the song of the choice in order, and the remaining trainees have to draw lots for their order to pick the songs of their choice. The mentors then play a prank on the trainees in which they go into classrooms meant for other mentors, and causes a lot of excitement and confusion amongst the trainees. Eventually they get started on practising the songs with the mentors, which culminates in a showcase.

Each group is shown with their self introduction, then their behind-the-scenes practices, followed by their actual on-stage performance.

E011
Song	Mentor	Trainees
Mask
Mask	Zhang Yixing	
Mask	Zhang Yixing	Cai Xukun (蔡徐坤)
Mask	Zhang Yixing	Wang Ziyi (王子异)
Mask	Zhang Yixing	Lou Zibo (娄滋博)
Mask	Zhang Yixing	Lin Chaoze (林超泽)
Mask	Zhang Yixing	Li Quanzhe (李权哲)
Mask	Zhang Yixing	Zheng Ruibin (郑锐彬)
Mask	Zhang Yixing	Han Mubo (韩木伯)
Quit Smoking
Quit Smoking	Li Ronghao	
Quit Smoking	Li Ronghao	You Zhangjing (尤长靖)
Quit Smoking	Li Ronghao	Chen Linong (陈立农)
Quit Smoking	Li Ronghao	Zhu Zhengting (朱正廷)
Quit Smoking	Li Ronghao	Ling Chao (灵超)
Quit Smoking	Li Ronghao	Mu Ziyang (木子样)
Quit Smoking	Li Ronghao	Yang Feitong (杨非同)
Quit Smoking	Li Ronghao	Lu Dinghao (陆定昊)
Zero
Zero	MC Jin	
Zero	MC Jin	Lin Yanjun (林彦俊)
Zero	MC Jin	Li Rang (李让)
Zero	MC Jin	Qian Zhenghao (钱正昊)
Zero	MC Jin	Huang Xinchun (黄新淳)
Zero	MC Jin	Xiao Gui (小鬼)
Zero	MC Jin	Zhou Rui (周锐)
Zero	MC Jin	Bu Fan (卜凡)
Agent J
Agent J	Zhou Jieqiong	
Agent J	Zhou Jieqiong	Fan Chengcheng (范丞丞)
Agent J	Zhou Jieqiong	Xu Shengen (徐圣恩)
Agent J	Zhou Jieqiong	Yu Mingjun (余明君)
Agent J	Zhou Jieqiong	Jeffrey
Agent J	Zhou Jieqiong	Li Xikan (李希侃)
Agent J	Zhou Jieqiong	Bi Wenjun (毕雯珺)
Agent J	Zhou Jieqiong	Yue Yue (岳岳)
24K Magic Remix Havana
24K Magic Remix Havana	Cheng Xiao	
24K Magic Remix Havana	Cheng Xiao	Justin
24K Magic Remix Havana	Cheng Xiao	Zhu Xingjie (朱星杰)
24K Magic Remix Havana	Cheng Xiao	Qin Fen (秦奋)
24K Magic Remix Havana	Cheng Xiao	He Dongdong (何东东)
24K Magic Remix Havana	Cheng Xiao	Luo Zheng (罗正)
24K Magic Remix Havana	Cheng Xiao	Zhou Yanchen (周彦辰)
24K Magic Remix Havana	Cheng Xiao	Ding Zeren (丁泽仁)

The 20 trainees are then given their last evaluation songs, "It's Ok" and "Mack Daddy", and they make their choices of song and position.

=== Episode 12 (April 6) ===
The final episode is also a live broadcast, in which clips of the trainees picking out their songs, center position, and practices are interspersed with the events happening at the live showcase. The episode starts with the trainees at individual interviews, which they're given the plastic chairs with the ranking labels they each chosen to sit on in the first episode, and it triggers nostalgic memories within the trainees. They're also asked about what if they don't manage to debut.

The live broadcast is now shown, with all 99 trainees returning to perform "Ei Ei" live. Individual trainee Zhou Rui, invited by Zhang Yixing, introduces each company and their representatives. The group name of the debuting group is announced to be "Nine Percent", which represents the top 9 out of 100 trainees carrying forward the dreams of all the trainees with 100% of their effort, hence the name 9%.

After the mentors' introductions, the broadcast cuts to the selection of "It's Ok"'s center position. The selection process is done by the group performing the chorus, with each trainee taking the role of center once, then a closed voting process within the members of that group. The top 2 choices for "It's Ok" were Lin Chaoze and Lin Yanjun. As the center is due to be announced, the video cuts back to the broadcast, where "It's Ok"'s performers appear onstage, and Lin Yanjun is revealed as the center of the song.

"Mack Daddy" goes through the same process, where the top 2 choices were Cai Xukun and Fan Chengcheng. Cai Xukun is revealed to be the center.

Color Key

- Final Members of 9 Percent

E12
Song	Position	Trainee
It's Ok
It's Ok	Lead Vocal	You Zhangjing (尤长靖)
It's Ok	Subvocal 1	Ling Chao (灵超)
It's Ok	Subvocal 2	Bi Wenjun (毕雯珺)
It's Ok	Subvocal 3	Li Xikan (李希侃)
It's Ok	Subvocal 4	Jeffrey
It's Ok	Subvocal 5	Lin Chaoze (林超泽)
It's Ok	Subvocal 6	Lin Yanjun (林彦俊) (center)
It's Ok	Subvocal 7	Zheng Ruibin (郑锐彬)
It's Ok	Rap 1	Xiao Gui (小鬼)
It's Ok	Rap 2	Justin
Mack Daddy
Mack Daddy	Lead Vocal	Cai Xukun (蔡徐坤) (center)
Mack Daddy	Subvocal 1	Qin Fen (秦奋)
Mack Daddy	Subvocal 2	Xu Shengen (徐圣恩)
Mack Daddy	Subvocal 3	Fan Chengcheng (范丞丞)
Mack Daddy	Subvocal 4	Qian Zhenghao (钱正昊)
Mack Daddy	Subvocal 5	Zhu Zhengting (朱正廷)
Mack Daddy	Subvocal 6	Zhu Xingjie (朱星杰)
Mack Daddy	Rap 1	Bu Fan (卜凡)
Mack Daddy	Rap 2	Chen Linong (陈立农)
Mack Daddy	Rap 3	Wang Ziyi (王子异)

In another clip, the 20 trainees also dress in the clothes they've worn for their first self-introduction, and speak in reminiscence of what they've said during that introduction, and express their thoughts.

Following that in the live broadcast, is a performance of a special song, titled "Forever", depicting the wishes of the trainees to stay like they once were, and as a thank-you to the fans for their support.

The trainees are shown invited individually into a dark room standing in front of a mirror, where they're asked to talk to their reflections in the mirror about their feelings. The lights are then turned off, which throws the scene into a humorous one as the trainees get paranoid about the situation being another ghost prank, with varied amusing reactions. However, this time video messages are screened on the surface of the mirror from the trainees' families to them, which causes a few to break down in tears.

The announcement of the top 9 takes up about 1 hour and 15 mins of the 3-hour long broadcast. As usual, the rankings are announced from the top 8 to 1, and each trainee walks from one end of the long stage to the main stage to take their seat, and present a short speech of thanks. The top 4 positions remained unchanged from the previous week, with You Zhangjing coming in as 9th place, taking the last position of the debuting group, Nine Percent.

The trainees then visit places in their dorm they've been to for the last time, including the dorm rooms, laundry room, makeup room, and more hilariously, the toilets. They talk about the memories they've had in the past four months of training, and finally clap the slate a final time. Memories of the past 12 episodes are shown, and the episode returns to the broadcast, where Zhang Yixing thanks everyone and wraps up Idol Producer.

Rank	Trainee
1	蔡徐坤 Cai Xukun
2	陈立农 Chen Linong
3	范丞丞 Fan Chengcheng
4	Justin
5	林彦俊 Lin Yanjun
6	朱正廷 Zhu Zhengting
7	王子异 Wang Ziyi
8	小鬼 Xiao Gui
9	尤长靖 You Zhangjing
10	毕雯珺 Bi Wenjun
11	钱正昊 Qian Zhenghao
12	卜凡 Bu Fan
13	李希侃 Li Xikan
14	朱星杰 Zhu Xingjie
15	灵超 Ling Chao
16	郑锐彬 Zheng Ruibin
17	Jeffrey
18	秦奋 Qin Fen
19	林超泽 Lin Chaoze
20	徐圣恩 Xu Shengen

== Contestants ==
Color key

- Top 9 of the week
- Top 9 of the week [Live only]
- Eliminated in Episode 5
- Eliminated in Episode 8
- Eliminated in Episode 10
- Eliminated in Episode 12
- Final members of Nine Percent

Company	Contestant														
Company	Name	Nationality	Age	Grade		Ranking									
Company	Name	Nationality	Age	1	2	E02	E03	E04 (Live Votes)	E05	E06	E07 (Live votes)	E08	E09 (Live votes)	E10	E12
Banana Entertainment (香蕉娱乐)	Lin Yanjun (林彦俊)	Republic of China (Taiwan)	22	C	D	31	27	51	28	19	19	22	6	11	5
Banana Entertainment (香蕉娱乐)	You Zhangjing (尤长靖)	Malaysia	23	B	A	69	13	34	10	10	3	8	10	8	9
Banana Entertainment (香蕉娱乐)	Lin Chaoze (林超泽)	China	21	A	A	32	20	35	14	14	36	16	32	15	19
Banana Entertainment (香蕉娱乐)	Lu Dinghao (陸定昊)	China	22	C	C	39	34	9	30	36	38	31	27	Eliminated	
Banana Entertainment (香蕉娱乐)	Bei Honglin (贝汯璘)	Republic of China (Taiwan)	21	C	B	33	37	20	37	45	49	Eliminated			
Banana Entertainment (香蕉娱乐)	Jiang Jingzuo (姜京佐)	China	20	C	C	59	60	12	Eliminated						
Banana Entertainment (香蕉娱乐)	Li Ruotian (李若天)	China	20	C	F	55	64	54	Eliminated						
Banana Entertainment (香蕉娱乐)	Qiu Zhixie (邱治谐)	Republic of China (Taiwan)	24	C	C	96	95	89	Eliminated						
Banana Entertainment (香蕉娱乐)	Gao Maotong (高茂桐)	China	17	C	D	46	53	22	Eliminated						
Yuehua Entertainment (乐华娱乐)	Fan Chengcheng (范丞丞)	China	17	D	D	3	3	5	3	3	1	3	5	3	3
Yuehua Entertainment (乐华娱乐)	Justin (黄明昊) (Note: Former Produce 101 Contestant.)	China	15	A	B	4	4	7	4	2	8	2	2	4	4
Yuehua Entertainment (乐华娱乐)	Zhu Zhengting (朱正廷) (Note: Former Produce 101 Contestant.)	China	21	A	A	5	5	2	5	4	2	4	3	7	6
Yuehua Entertainment (乐华娱乐)	Bi Wenjun (毕雯珺)	China	20	D	D	15	25	17	26	27	3	27	16	12	10
Yuehua Entertainment (乐华娱乐)	Ding Zeren (丁泽仁)	China	18	A	B	17	21	53	20	21	5	19	13	Eliminated	
Yuehua Entertainment (乐华娱乐)	Li Quanzhe (李权哲)	China	17	F	B	24	30	74	8	9	14	12	23	Eliminated	
Yuehua Entertainment (乐华娱乐)	Huang Xinchun (黃新淳)	China	19	F	F	22	29	52	33	25	10	29	31	Eliminated	
Mavericks Entertainment (麦锐娱乐)	Li Xikan (李希侃)	China	19	D	C	20	28	10	29	32	30	17	10	18	13
Mavericks Entertainment (麦锐娱乐)	Luo Zheng (罗正)	China	22	F	F	45	50	4	34	29	32	24	29	Eliminated	
Mavericks Entertainment (麦锐娱乐)	Yu Mingjun (余明君)	China	19	D	D	21	32	21	46	40	50	34	32	Eliminated	
Mavericks Entertainment (麦锐娱乐)	Lu Chenyu (呂晨瑜)	China	19	D	F	66	74	43	Eliminated						
Mavericks Entertainment (麦锐娱乐)	Deng Langyi (邓烺怡)	China	22	F	C	42	54	45	Eliminated						
Mavericks Entertainment (麦锐娱乐)	Sun Fanjie (孙凡杰)	China	20	F	D	88	94	78	Eliminated						
MERCURY NATION (辰星娱乐)	Xu Shengen (徐圣恩)	China	21	C	D	67	73	77	54	42	35	28	32	19	20
MERCURY NATION (辰星娱乐)	Jia Li (伽里)	China	17	C	D	81	69	91	51	58	56	Eliminated			
MERCURY NATION (辰星娱乐)	J-ONE (姜祎)	China	21	C	F	85	91	48	Eliminated						
MERCURY NATION (辰星娱乐)	Rapen (罗仁麒)	China	21	C	F	64	71	94	Eliminated						
Simply Joy Music (简单快乐音乐)	Wang Ziyi (王子异)	China	21	A	B	14	19	25	11	8	28	7	8	5	7
Simply Joy Music (简单快乐音乐)	Sun Haoran (孙浩然)	China	23	B	F	65	59	36	Eliminated						
Simply Joy Music (简单快乐音乐)	Lin Haokai (林浩楷)	China	19	B	F	57	65	41	Eliminated						
Simply Joy Music (简单快乐音乐)	Li Zhijie (李志杰)	China	23	B	D	94	96	32	Eliminated						
Simply Joy Music (简单快乐音乐)	Jin Yihan (金逸涵)	Portugal	15	B	F	54	68	75	Eliminated						
Shiningstar (新锐杂志)	Wan Yuxian (万宇贤)	China	22	C	C	95	87	26	Eliminated						
Shiningstar (新锐杂志)	Ying Zhiyue (应智越)	Hong Kong	24	C	D	87	90	67	Eliminated						
Shiningstar (新锐杂志)	Zhao Yuche (赵俞澈)	China	22	D	D	93	78	60	Eliminated						
Shiningstar (新锐杂志)	Zhu Yuntian (朱匀天)	China	22	D	D	63	47	18	53	56	11	Eliminated			
Shiningstar (新锐杂志)	Zhu Yunyi (朱匀一)	China	22	D	D	61	45	15	50	55	60	Eliminated			
Summer Star (盛夏星空)	Chen Minghao (陈名豪)	China	23	F	F	29	42	56	47	57	13	Eliminated			
Summer Star (盛夏星空)	Zhang Dayuan (张达源)	China	21	F	F	79	57	11	35	48	52	Eliminated			
Summer Star (盛夏星空)	Wang Zihao (王梓豪)	China	21	C	D	90	88	72	Eliminated						
Summer Star (盛夏星空)	Wang Yilong (王艺龙)	China	24	D	C	77	76	14	57	59	31	Eliminated			
Summer Star (盛夏星空)	Yang Feitong (杨非同)	China	23	D	D	86	89	3	49	33	37	30	27	Eliminated	
OACA (觉醒东方)	Qin Fen (秦奋) (Note: Former The Legend member.)	China	26	B	F	13	10	59	13	12	9	11	20	17	18
OACA (觉醒东方)	Han Mubo (韩沐伯)	China	26	C	C	12	11	71	19	24	22	21	24	Eliminated	
OACA (觉醒东方)	Jing Peiyao (靖佩瑶)	China	21	C	F	43	40	68	45	46	25	Eliminated			
OACA (觉醒东方)	Qin Zimo (秦子墨)	China	23	D	F	28	35	27	41	47	29	Eliminated			
OACA (觉醒东方)	Zuo Ye (左叶)	China	16	F	D	18	18	76	22	41	53	Eliminated			
Qin's Entertainment (坤音娱乐)	Yue Yue (岳岳)	China	25	C	D	40	22	81	21	17	23	18	18	Eliminated	
Qin's Entertainment (坤音娱乐)	Mu Ziyang (木子洋)	China	23	C	F	53	23	70	24	16	20	20	7	Eliminated	
Qin's Entertainment (坤音娱乐)	Bu Fan (卜凡)	China	21	C	F	9	8	62	7	7	21	10	13	9	12
Qin's Entertainment (坤音娱乐)	Ling Chao (灵超)	China	17	C	D	23	17	61	16	11	17	9	12	13	15
Boyi Culture (铂熠文化)	Zhang Xin (张昕)	China	Unknown	F	C	91	93	95	Eliminated						
Boyi Culture (铂熠文化)	Ye Hongxi (叶泓希)	China	Unknown	F	C	89	92	88	Eliminated						
Boyi Culture (铂熠文化)	Zhang Yixuan (张奕轩)	China	19	C	B	74	77	38	56	43	47	Eliminated			
Boyi Culture (铂熠文化)	Ling Qi (凌崎)	China	15	C	D	51	62	83	52	44	58	Eliminated			
SSTAR (星焕文化)	Zhang Yuchen (张宇晨)	China	17	F	D	82	85	29	Eliminated						
SSTAR (星焕文化)	Luo Jie (罗杰)	China	Unknown	D	C	68	75	33	Eliminated						
SSTAR (星焕文化)	He Jiageng (何嘉庚)	China	18	F	D	52	66	37	Eliminated						
CNC (超能唱片)	Qin Junyi (覃俊毅)	China	20	C	F	48	51	79	43	34	48	Eliminated			
CNC (超能唱片)	Wu Lianjie (武連杰)	China	21	F	C	47	52	24	42	35	57	Eliminated			
CNC (超能唱片)	Lou Zibo (娄滋博)	China	17	D	C	60	58	63	44	30	12	32	29	Eliminated	
CNC (超能唱片)	Li Rang (李让)	China	24	C	D	26	36	42	36	31	50	35	24	Eliminated	
Asian Idol Factory Entertainment (A.I.F娱乐/亚洲偶像工厂)	Zhang Yifan (张艺凡)	China	Unknown	B	A	84	84	50	Eliminated						
Asian Idol Factory Entertainment (A.I.F娱乐/亚洲偶像工厂)	Traple (赵凌峰)	China	25	C	D	97	97	93	Eliminated						
Asian Idol Factory Entertainment (A.I.F娱乐/亚洲偶像工厂)	Hook (于浩)	China	23	C	F	80	81	97	Eliminated						
Asian Idol Factory Entertainment (A.I.F娱乐/亚洲偶像工厂)	Yang Yi (杨羿)	China	20	B	C	83	86	99	Eliminated						
Gramarie Entertainment (果然娱乐)	Xiao Gui (小鬼)	China	18	B	B	7	6	58	6	6	6	6	9	6	8
Gramarie Entertainment (果然娱乐)	Zhang Yankai (张晏恺)	China	16	C	F	71	72	55	Eliminated						
Gramarie Entertainment (果然娱乐)	Zhou Yanchen (周彦辰)	China	21	B	B	27	31	23	27	18	27	14	21	Eliminated	
Gramarie Entertainment (果然娱乐)	Zhu Xingjie (朱星杰)	China	23	B	B	16	15	6	15	15	24	13	13	14	14
Dimensions Multimedia (次元文化)	Chen Siqi (陈斯琪)	China	22	D	C	35	38	57	39	51	46	Eliminated			
Dimensions Multimedia (次元文化)	Xu Heni (徐鶴尼)	China	19	C	F	76	63	28	Eliminated						
Hong Yi Entertainment (红熠文化)	Li Changgeng (李长庚)	China	21	D	D	19	26	86	38	50	33	Eliminated			
Hong Yi Entertainment (红熠文化)	He Dongdong (何东东)	China	21	D	F	6	7	16	9	28	55	33	35	Eliminated	
Levent Entertainment (乐风艺社)	Min Zhexiang (闵喆祥)	China	21	C	C	99	98	13	Eliminated						
Levent Entertainment (乐风艺社)	Chen Yifu (陈义夫)	China	16	B	F	37	46	73	Eliminated						
Super Jet Entertainment (捷特联合)	Han Yongjie (韩雍杰)	China	19	F	D	34	43	31	40	52	44	Eliminated			
Young Culture (亚歌文化)	Qian Zhenghao (钱正昊)	China	17	B	F	70	12	65	17	20	18	26	24	10	11
Wild Fire Entertainment (野火娱乐)	Jack Hsu Kaihao (许凯皓)	Republic of China (Taiwan)	25	B	C	11	14	82	23	39	54	Eliminated			
NewStyle Media (新湃传媒)	Yu Bin (于斌) (Note: Former M4M member.)	China	26	F	D	50	49	87	Eliminated						
Emperor Entertainment Group (英皇娱乐)	Ming Peng (明鵬)	China	23	F	D	38	44	30	48	53	45	Eliminated			
Ciwen Media (慈文传媒)	Dong Yanlei (董岩磊)	China	21	F	F	10	16	96	18	26	42	Eliminated			
A Legend Star Entertainment (传奇星娱乐)	Chen Linong (陈立农)	Republic of China (Taiwan)	17	A	C	1	2	1	2	5	34	5	4	2	2
Huayi Brothers (华谊兄弟)	Zheng Ruibin (郑锐彬)	China	21	B	A	41	39	39	25	23	16	25	16	20	16
Huayi Brothers (华谊兄弟)	Jeffrey Tung (董又霖)	Republic of China (Taiwan)	22	B	D	8	9	69	12	13	26	15	18	16	17
Hua Ying Yi Xing (华影艺星)	Huang Shuhao (黄书豪)	Thailand	23	D	F	56	24	64	32	37	41	Eliminated			
Tianjin Broadcasting (天津中视)	Zhu Yiwen (朱一文)	China	24	B	F	73	61	44	Eliminated						
Sparkling Culture (點星文化)	Hu Zhibang (胡致邦)	China	20	F	D	44	56	66	59	38	42	Eliminated			
Individual Trainee	Cai Xukun (蔡徐坤) (Note: Former Swin member.)	China	19	A	A	2	1	8	1	1	15	1	1	1	1
Individual Trainee	Zhou Tengyang (周腾阳)	China	23	C	F	92	83	40	Eliminated						
Individual Trainee	Huang Ruohan (黃若涵)	China	19	C	F	72	82	98	Eliminated						
Individual Trainee	Gan Jun (甘俊)	China	23	B	D	62	67	80	Eliminated						
Individual Trainee	Hou Haoran (侯浩然)	China	22	C	F	75	80	49	Eliminated						
Individual Trainee	Li Junyi (李俊毅)	China	25	B	A	78	79	90	55	49	40	Eliminated			
Individual Trainee	Zhou Rui (周锐)	China	25	D	B	49	55	46	31	22	7	23	25	Eliminated	
Withdrawn Contestants
MLody Studio (MLody工作室)	Jiang Dahe (姜达赫)	China	19	D	F	30	41	47	58	60	59	Left the show, rumored to have left due to an injury			
Joy Star (臻星娱乐)	Liang Hui (梁輝) (Note: Former 24K member.)	China	22	D	F	36	48	19	60	54	39	Left the show, rumored to have done fake votes			
SSTAR (星焕文化)	Li Xinyan (李鑫岩)	China	19	F	F	58	70	84	Medical retirement, was diagnosed with myocarditis						
MERCURY NATION (辰星娱乐)	Gigel (张津铭)	China	21	C	D	25	33	92	Disciplinary expulsion, involved in violence with each other, thus breaking ground rules						
MERCURY NATION (辰星娱乐)	Wang Youchen (王宥辰)	China	Unknown	C	F	98	99	85	Disciplinary expulsion, involved in violence with each other, thus breaking ground rules						
Individual Trainee	Song Shuijiao (宋睡覺)	China	Unknown	B	F	Left the show, controversial video from the past surfaced									

=== Top 9 ===
	E02	E03	E04 (Live votes)	E05	E06	E07 (Live votes)	E08	E09 (Live votes)	E10	E12
1	Chen Linong (陈立农)	Cai Xukun (蔡徐坤)	Chen Linong (陈立农)	Cai Xukun (蔡徐坤)	Cai Xukun (蔡徐坤)	Fan Chengcheng (范丞丞)	Cai Xukun (蔡徐坤)	Cai Xukun (蔡徐坤)	Cai Xukun (蔡徐坤)	Cai Xukun (蔡徐坤)
2	Cai Xukun (蔡徐坤)	Chen Linong (陈立农)	Zhu Zhengting (朱正廷)	Chen Linong (陈立农)	Justin (黄明昊)	Zhu Zhengting (朱正廷)	Justin (黄明昊)	Justin (黄明昊)	Chen Linong (陈立农)	Chen Linong (陈立农)
3	Fan Chengcheng (范丞丞)	Fan Chengcheng (范丞丞)	Yang Feitong (杨非同)	Fan Chengcheng (范丞丞)	Fan Chengcheng (范丞丞)	Bi Wenjun & You Zhang Jin (毕雯珺 & 尤长靖)	Fan Chengcheng (范丞丞)	Zhu Zhengting (朱正廷)	Fan Chengcheng (范丞丞)	Fan Chengcheng (范丞丞)
4	Justin (黄明昊)	Justin (黄明昊)	Luo Zheng (罗正)	Justin (黄明昊)	Zhu Zhengting (朱正廷)	Bi Wenjun & You Zhang Jin (毕雯珺 & 尤长靖)	Zhu Zhengting (朱正廷)	Chen Linong (陈立农)	Justin (黄明昊)	Justin (黄明昊)
5	Zhu Zhengting (朱正廷)	Zhu Zhengting (朱正廷)	Fan Chengcheng (范丞丞)	Zhu Zhengting (朱正廷)	Chen Linong (陈立农)	Ding Zeren (丁泽仁)	Chen Linong (陈立农)	Fan Chengcheng (范丞丞)	Wang Ziyi (王子异)	Lin Yanjun (林彦俊)
6	He Dongdong (何东东)	Xiao Gui (小鬼)	Zhu Xingjie (朱星杰)	Xiao Gui (小鬼)	Xiao Gui (小鬼)	Xiao Gui (小鬼)	Xiao Gui (小鬼)	Lin Yanjun (林彦俊)	Xiao Gui (小鬼)	Zhu Zhengting (朱正廷)
7	Xiao Gui (小鬼)	He Dongdong (何东东)	Justin (黄明昊)	Bu Fan (卜凡)	Bu Fan (卜凡)	Zhou Rui (周锐)	Wang Ziyi (王子异)	Mu Ziyang (木子洋)	Zhu Zhengting (朱正廷)	Wang Ziyi (王子异)
8	Jeffrey	Bu Fan (卜凡)	Cai Xukun (蔡徐坤)	Li Quanzhe (李权哲)	Wang Ziyi (王子异)	Justin (黄明昊)	You Zhangjing (尤长靖)	Wang Ziyi (王子异)	You Zhangjing (尤长靖)	Xiao Gui (小鬼)
9	Bu Fan (卜凡)	Jeffrey	Lu Dinghao (陸定昊)	He Dongdong (何东东)	Li Quanzhe (李权哲)	Qin Fen (秦奋)	Ling Chao (灵超)	Xiao Gui (小鬼)	Bu Fan (卜凡)	You Zhangjing (尤长靖)

== Elimination chart ==
=== Color key ===
Debut member
Contestant eliminated in the final episode
Contestant eliminated in the third elimination round
Contestant eliminated in the second elimination round
Contestant eliminated in the first elimination round
Contestant left the show

Idol Producer Contestants
Cai Xukun (蔡徐坤)	Chen Linong (陈立农)	Fan Chengcheng (范丞丞)	Justin Huang (黄明昊)	Lin Yanjun (林彦俊)
Zhu Zhengting (朱正廷)	Wang Ziyi (王子异)	Xiao Gui (小鬼)	You Zhangjing (尤长靖)	Bi Wenjun (毕雯珺)
Qian Zhenghao (钱正昊)	Bu Fan (卜凡)	Li Xikan (李希侃)	Zhu Xingjie (朱星杰)	Ling Chao (灵超)
Zheng Ruibin (郑锐彬)	Jeffrey Tung (董又霖)	Qin Fen (秦奋)	Lin Chaoze (林超泽)	Xu Shengen (徐圣恩)
Zhou Yanchen (周彦辰)	Mu Ziyang (木子洋)	Li Quanzhe (李权哲)	Han Mubo (韩沐伯)	Zhou Rui (周锐)
Ding Zeren (丁泽仁)	Yue Yue (岳岳)	Yang Feitong (杨非同)	Lou Zibo (娄滋博)	Luo Zheng (罗正)
Lu Dinghao (陸定昊)	Huang Xinchun (黃新淳)	He Dongdong (何东东)	Li Rang (李让)	Yu Mingjun (余明君)
Zuo Ye (左叶)	Dong Yanlei (董岩磊)	Hu Zhibang (胡致邦)	Wu Lianjie (武連杰)	Qin Junyi (覃俊毅)
Zhang Yixuan (张奕轩)	Han Yongjie (韩雍杰)	Huang Shuhao (黄书豪)	Jack Hsu Kaihao (许凯皓)	Wang Yilong (王艺龙)
Jing Peiyao (靖佩瑶)	Zhu Yunyi (朱匀一)	Zhu Yuntian (朱匀天)	Ling Qi (凌崎)	Li Junyi (李俊毅)
Qin Zimo (秦子墨)	Chen Minghao (陈名豪)	Bei Honglin (貝汯璘)	Li Changgeng (李长庚)	Zhang Dayuan (张达源)
Chen Siqi (陈斯琪)	Ming Peng (明鵬)	Jia Li (伽里)	Liang Hui (梁輝)	Jiang Dahe (姜达赫)
Jiang Jingzuo (姜京佐)	Chen Yifu (陈义夫)	Yu Bin (于斌)	Gao Maotong (高茂桐)	Deng Langyi (邓烺怡)
Sun Haoran (孙浩然)	Zhu Yiwen (朱一文)	Xu Heni (徐鶴尼)	Li Ruotian (李若天)	Lin Haokai (林浩楷)
He Jiageng (何嘉庚)	Gan Jun (甘俊)	Jin Yihan (金逸涵)	Rapen (罗仁麒)	Zhang Yankai (张晏恺)
Lu Chenyu (呂晨瑜)	Luo Jie (罗杰)	Zhao Yuche (赵俞澈)	Hou Haoran (侯浩然)	Yu Hao (于浩)
Huang Ruohan (黃若涵)	Zhou Tengyang (周腾阳)	Zhang Yifan (张艺凡)	Zhang Yuchen (张宇晨)	Yang Yi (杨羿)
Wan Yuxian (万宇贤)	Wang Zihao (王梓豪)	Ying Zhiyue (应智越)	J-ONE	Ye Hongxi (叶泓希)
Zhang Xin (张昕)	Sun Fanjie (孙凡杰)	Qiu Zhixie (邱治谐)	Li Zhijie (李志杰)	Zhao Lingfeng (赵凌峰)
Min Zhexiang (闵喆祥)	Gigel	Li Xinyan (李鑫岩)	Wang Youchen (王宥辰)	Song Shuijiao (宋睡覺)

== Production ==
Idol Producer is jointly created and produced by iQIYI and Beijing Caviar Communications, a television production start-up founded and headed by ex-HBS employee-turned-executive Lei Ying.

Chief producer Jiang Bin has previously produced many well known reality talent shows including S-style Show, I Supermodel and Road to the Runway. The show recruited Cheng Gang, the chief director of Super Boy and Tan Yan, the visual director of I Am a Singer.

The coaches for the series were introduced through posters, which were uploaded online. On December 17, 2017, a press conference was held where coaches Lay Zhang, Jackson Wang, Cheng Xiao, Zhou Jieqiong and MC Jin attended. On February 3, 2018, a total of 21 contestants (Note: Bei Honglin, Cai Xukun, Chen Linong, Ding Zeren, Fan Chengcheng, Li Quanzhe, Lu Dinghao, Luo Zheng, Wang Ziyi, Xiao Gui, Yang Feitong, Zhang Yifan, Zheng Ruibin, Zhang Yixuan, You Zhangqing, Zhu Zhengting, Zhu Xingjie) were invited by Lay Zhang to guest star on Chinese variety show, Happy Camp.

== Reception ==
The first episode of the show garnered over 100 million viewers within the first hour of broadcast on iQiyi. Lay Zhang was remarked for his scrutiny towards the contestants during their performances.

== Discography ==
=== Singles ===
Title	Album details
Idol Producer OST	Released: January 16, 2018; Language: Mandarin; Track listing: 1. Ei Ei

== Controversy ==
=== Copyright ===
The show has been accused of plagiarizing the format of South Korean talent show Produce 101. The head of formats and development at Mnet, Jin Woo Hwang claimed that “People in our company were shocked because it wasn’t just a similar show – it was almost a duplicate show.”

The Format Recognition and Protection Association revealed results of its comparative analysis of “Idol Producer,” launched by China's iQiyi in January 2018 and South Korean company CJ E&M, the production company of “Produce 101”, which launched in 2016. The analysis concluded that the Chinese show scored 88% on FRAPA's scale of infringement when compared with the Korean show – it was the highest score ever recorded for an alleged infringement.

=== Misconduct ===
Individual trainee Song Shuijiao was forced to leave Idol Producer due to verbal misconduct degrading women widespread over the internet. The trainee participated in the filming of the first episode, but was subsequently edited out prior to the broadcast.

Young Culture's Qian Zhenghao was found to have violated dormitory regulations by eating hot pot in the dormitory late at night. A handwritten letter of apology was posted on the official Idol Producer dormitory Sina Weibo account.

Two of MERCURY NATION'S trainees, GIGEL and Wang Youchen, were removed from the show as disciplinary action for ground fighting in the dormitory.
