= Li Xikan =

Chinese singer and actor (born 1998)

- Born: 11 April 1998 (age 28); Wenzhou, Jiangsu, China
- Other names: Xiao Huli; SayKan
- Occupations: Singer; Actor
- Musical career
- Genres: C-pop; Hip hop
- Instrument: Vocals
- Years active: 2007–present
- Label: Kuyang Entertainment

Chinese name
- Simplified Chinese: 李希侃
Transcriptions
Standard Mandarin
- Hanyu Pinyin: Lǐ Xīkǎn

Li Xikan (Chinese: 李希侃; born 11 April 1998), also known by his English name SayKan Lee, is a Chinese singer and actor. He is a member of the Chinese boy group S.K.Y from the 2020 Chinese survival talent show We Are Young. On 27 January 2019, he won the "Most Popular Male Singer" award at the 2019 5th Ruili Music Festival.

== Career ==
=== 2007-2017 ===
He played the actor Mu Jiale in the play AA Happy Camp. This is his first TV drama work.

=== 2018: Idol producer ===
On 19 January 2018, the idol men's group competition and development reality show Idol Producer, was broadcast on iQiyi. He finished the show in 13th place, four spots shy of joining the final group. On 21 September, he released the third single with MR- X "I Don't Wanna Fight Tonight". On 12 October, he participated in the Youku variety show "Mars Intelligence Agency Season 4" which went live, and he sang the theme song "Monster Invasion" for the show. In the same month, he participated in the iQiyi reality business variety show "Fantasy Restaurant". On 3 December, his first personal EP "K" was released.

=== 2019 ===
On 27 January 2019, he won the 5th Annual Beauty Awards of Ruili, the Most Popular Male Singer of the year. On 1 June, he attended the "Young Influential Chinese Youth Star Charity Model Ceremony" and sang with Lu Yupeng and Deng Chaoyuan. The theme song "Embrace You" for the 30th World AIDS Day, and was awarded the "Chinese Youth Star Charity Advocate".

=== 2020: debut ===
In 2020, he participated in a variety show We Are Young, a variety show for the growth of youth, and finally joined the boy group "S.K.Y" and debuting in the first place. On 13 November, he served as a guest in the sixth episode of the "Mars Intelligence Agency Season 5" broadcast. In April 2021, he joined Dragon TV's music label confrontation show "Youth and Melody" as the Kuyang family label family.

== Filmography ==
=== Television series ===
Year	Title	Chinese Title	Network	Role
2008	AA Happy Camp	AA欢乐营	Tencent	Mu Jiale
2019	Chasing the Ball	追球	iQiyi	侯建英

=== Television shows ===
Year	Title	Chinese Title	Network	Notes
2018	Idol Producer	偶像练习生	iQiyi	Contestant
2018	Incredible Mothers Season 2	不可思议的妈妈第二季	Tencent	Guest
2018	Idol Hits	中国音乐公告牌	Billboard China	Main Guest
2018	Idol Hits	中国音乐公告牌	Billboard China	Temporary Guest
2018	Mars Intelligence Agency Season 4	火星情报局第四季	Youku	Temporary Agent
2018	The Wonderful Light of Food	奇妙的食光	iQiyi	Temporary Guest
2020	We Are Young	少年之名	Youku	Contestant
2020	Mars Intelligence Agency Season 5	火星情报局第五季	Youku	Temporary Agent
2021	Youth and Melody	金曲青春	Dragon Television	Contestant

== Discography ==
=== Albums ===
Title	Album details	Sales
Black Romance	Released: 10 April 2020; Language: Mandarin; Label: Kuyang Entertainment; Track listing: 1. "黑浪漫"; 2. "坠入人间的流星"	—N/a
K	Released: 2 December 2018; Language: Mandarin; Label: Maverick's Entertainment; Track listing: 1. "INTRO"; 2. "CRAZY"; 3. "ALL RIGHT"	—N/a

=== TV series originals ===
Title	Year	
Title	Year	TV Series
"Sheep"	2018	Idol Producer
"Listen to What I Say" (听听我说的吧)	2018	Idol Producer
"It's Ok"	2018	Idol Producer
"Monster Invasion" (怪兽入侵)	2018	火星情报局
"Monster"	2020	We Are Young
"Use Everything I Have to Come to You" (用尽我的一切奔向你)	2020	We Are Young
"100 Ways"	2020	We Are Young
"Namanana"	2020	We Are Young

=== Collaborations ===
Title	Year	
Title	Year	With Who
"U&I"	2018	MR-X
"ZIGZAG"	2018	MR-X
"I Don’t Wanna Fight Tonight"	2018	MR-X
