= The Legend (band) =

2014–2017 South Korean boy band

The Legend 전설
- Also known as: Legend
- Origin: Seoul, South Korea
- Genres: K-pop; Dance-pop; Hip hop
- Years active: 2014–2017
- Labels: SS Entertainment
- Past members: Listen; Roi; Jaehyuk; Lito; Changsun

The Legend (Korean: 전설; also known as Legend) was a South Korean boy band formed by SS Entertainment (formerly JK Space Entertainment) in Seoul, South Korea. The group consisted of five members: Listen, Roi, Jaehyuk, Lito and Changsun. They debuted on July 9, 2014, with the single "Left Out". They officially disbanded in May 2017, after their contracts with SS Entertainment were canceled through a lawsuit.

== Members ==
- Listen (리슨)
- Roi (로이)
- Jaehyuk (제혁)
- Lito (리토)
- Changsun (창선)

== Discography ==
=== Extended plays ===
Title	Details	Peak chart positions	Sales
Title	Details	KOR	Sales
Out of My Mind	Released: October 30, 2014; Label: SS Entertainment, LOEN Entertainment; Formats: CD, digital download; Track listing: 1. Lost (로스트); 2. If Like Me (나와 같다면); 3. I Wanna Know; 4. Lost (로스트) inst.	24	KOR: 515+
Sound Up	Released: January 21, 2016; Label: SS Entertainment, LOEN Entertainment; Formats: CD, digital download; Track listing: 1. Crush On You (반했다); 2. I Want You Back; 3. This (이렇게); 4. Nail (손톱); 5. You & I 6. Crush On You (반했다) inst.	25	KOR: 738+

=== Singles ===
Title	Year	Peak chart positions	Album
Title	Year	KOR	Album
"Left Out" (미.남. – 미련이 남아서)	2014	—	Non-album single
"Lost" (로스트)	2014	—	Out of My Mind
"I Wanna Know"	2014	—	Out of My Mind
"Trace" (흔적)	2015	—	Non-album singles
"Shadow"	2015	—	Non-album singles
"Nail" (손톱)	2015	—	Sound Up
"Crush On You" (반했다)	2016	—	Sound Up
"This" (이렇게)	2016	—	Sound Up
"—" denotes releases that did not chart.
