= M4M (band) =

Boy band

- Origin: China
- Genres: Mandopop, K-Pop
- Years active: 2013–2014; 2018–present
- Labels: Cube Entertainment; Xing Tian (2013–2014)
- Members: Alen; Jimmy; Vinson; Yu Bin

M4M (Mystical Formula), is a Mandopop boy band formed in 2013 by South Korea's Cube Entertainment and China's Xing Tian Media. The group consists of four members; Alen, Jimmy, Vinson, and Yu Bin. The group debuted on March 13, 2013 on M! Countdown with the Korean version of Sadness. In March 2014, M4M announced that they are going to terminate their contracts with Chinese company Xing Tian Media, due to a lack of activity.

== History ==
=== Name origin ===
M4M is an abbreviation for Mystical Formula. The name is used to describe passion, mystery and infinite possibilities, whilst the number 4 is representational of the number of members in the group.

=== 2009–2012: Formation ===
In 2009, Xing Tian Media started to scout four individual talents to make up a new group. Although they were originally due to début before fellow labelmate BtoB, the departure of member and leader Park Jung-jong set back their début until the arrival of Alen.

=== 2013: Début ===
In February 2013, Cube Entertainment announced that the group, which had been training for 1,460 days, would be making their début although they didn't specify a date. On 12 March, they released the single for "Sadness" followed by their formal debut on M! Countdown and the uploading of the single's music video on YouTube on the following day. Two months later, they went on to release their first mini album, the self-titled "Mystery Formula" of which both a Chinese version and a Korean version were released.

=== 2018: Idol Producer ===
After a long hiatus, Bin became a trainee for NewStyle Media, and participates in Idol Producer.

== Members ==
=== Current members ===
- Alen (Fang Yilun 方逸伦) - China
- Jimmy (Zhu Zhaofeng 朱兆豐) - Hong Kong
- Vinson (Luo Yusheng 罗宇胜) - Taiwan
- Yubin (于斌) - Macau

== Discography ==
=== Extended plays ===
- Mystery Formula

=== Singles ===
Title	Year	Album
Chinese
"When You Love Me"	2013	Mystery Formula (神秘方程式)
"Sadness"	2013	Non-album singles
Korean	2013	
"Sadness"	2013	Non-album singles

== Filmography ==
- 20 Once Again
- A Different Kind of Pretty Man
- Tian Mi Sheng Huo
- Qing Chun Wan Wan Sui

== Awards and nominations ==
Year	Award	Nominated work	Result
2013 Asian Idol Awards
2013	Asian Soaring Idol Award	M4M	Won
