= SS Entertainment =

South Korean record label

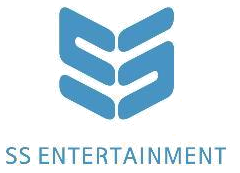
- Genre: K-pop, Hip-hop
- Predecessor: GYM Entertainment; JKSpace Entertainment
- Founded: June 2015
- Defunct: c. 2017
- Headquarters: Seoul, South Korea

SS Entertainment (Korean: SS 엔터테인먼트) was a South Korean record label. It previously represented boy group The Legend, Eun Ji-won and Gilme.

== History ==
Hip-hop artist and Sechs Kies member Eun Ji-won founded GYM Entertainment in 2009, with singer and rapper Gilme being the first artist to debut under the label.

In June 2015, the company was merged with JKSpace Entertainment, under which K-pop boy band The Legend was signed. Following the merge, Eun Ji-won, Gilme and The Legend continued to promote under the new company, SS Entertainment.

In January 2016, three of their female trainees, Lee Hae-in, Seo Hye-lin and Lee Su-hyun, competed in the Mnet survival show Produce 101. Lee Hae-in and Lee Su-hyun made it to the final episode but neither made the final lineup of I.O.I.

As of May 2016, Eun Ji-won and Gilme are back to being officially managed by GYM Entertainment. The official V App channel of SS Entertainment has also been changed to GYM Entertainment and videos related to SS Entertainment talents like The Legend have been removed.

=== Lawsuits ===
On May 19, 2016, SS Entertainment trainees Lee Hae-in and Lee Su-hyun filed a lawsuit against the company to terminate their contracts. Their legal representative stated that their contracts are excessively long and its scope too broad that it affects their freedom regarding economic activity. The two trainees were also promised to debut within the year, but this was not kept. Besides this, they did not receive sufficient vocal and dance training while in the company. SS Entertainment then responded by stating that they will review the two trainees' complaints. The two trainees were able to terminate their contracts without any conditions and officially left the company on May 25, 2016.

The company's only remaining artist, The Legend, officially left the company on April 26, 2017, after successfully winning their lawsuit against the label which had been filed in July 2016.

== Artists ==
=== Former ===
==== Groups ====
- The Legend (2014–2017)

==== Soloists ====
- Eun Ji-won (2015–2016)
- Gilme (2015–2016)
