= Teen pop =

Genre of popular music with an adolescent audience

- Stylistic origins: Pop; bubblegum pop; rock; new wave; disco; funk; hip-hop; techno; synth-pop; dance-pop; R&B; urban
- Cultural origins: 1980s to 1990s, United States

Fusion genres
- Adult contemporary

Regional scenes
- Orlando, Florida Los Angeles, California

Other topics
- Boy band; Girl group; Pop icon

Teen pop is a subgenre of pop music that is created by, marketed to, and oriented towards preteens and teenagers. Often, the artists themselves are teenagers during their breakout. While it can involve influences from a wide array of musical genres, it remains a subset of pop music, focusing on catchy melodies and marketability. Teen pop’s lyrics emphasize themes that teenagers can relate to, such as love, growing up, or partying. The image of the artist as an aspirational or desirable teenage figure is a crucial element of the genre, highlighting their visual appeal.

Despite facing criticism for being perceived as inauthentic or overly commercial, teen pop has remained a defining genre in the music industry. The genre's popularity can be attributed to teenage listeners' disposable income, which they often devote to purchasing singles, albums, and merchandise. The impact of the teen pop genre extends beyond the music industry into culture, influencing fashion, language, and social trends. Teenage fans often develop a parasocial relationship with their idols, believing that the artist cares about them and their fellow fans. The intense connection between teen pop artists and their young audiences has had a profound effect on the psychological nature of teenagers, shaping their self-image and cultural identity.

== Characteristics ==
Structurally, teen pop may include influences from a variety of other genres, such as R&B, rock, electronic, or hip-hop. Usually, it includes catchy repeated chorus lines, Auto-Tuned or pitch-corrected vocals, and upbeat melodies.

Appealing to adolescents, teen pop songs often address romantic relationships: in a 2002 article, Phillip Vannini and Scott Myers found that 155 of the 169 songs on fourteen teen-oriented pop albums addressed romantic love. An element of visual appeal is integral to teen pop, with teen idols usually being an object of desire or aspiration to their fans, often by cultivating an image of being a girl/boy next door. Stylish fashion, popular hairstyles, and choreographed dance crazes are important commercial elements of teen pop.

According to AllMusic, teen pop "is essentially dance-pop, pop, and urban ballads" that are marketed to teens, and was conceived in its contemporary form during the late 1980s and 1990s, pointing out the late 1990s as "arguably the style's golden era." About.com's Bill Lamb described teen pop sound as "a simple, straightforward, ultra-catchy melody line [...] The songs may incorporate elements of other pop music genres, but usually they will never be mistaken for anything but mainstream pop. The music is designed for maximum focus on the performer and a direct appeal to listeners."

In "Crazy About You: Reflections on the Meanings of Contemporary Teen Pop Music" (2002), Phillip Vannini and Scott M. Myers write that teen pop songs "are targeted to youths presumably unaware and unconcerned with the problems of everyday society. Youths are symbolized as mainly in growing up while having a good time." Some authors deemed teen pop music as "more disposable, less intellectually challenging, more feminine, simpler and more commercially focused than other musical forms." In Music Scenes: Local, Translocal and Virtual, author Melanie Lowe wrote that teen pop "is marked by a clash of presumed innocence and overt sexuality, a conflict that mirrors the physical and emotional turmoil of its primary target audience and vital fan base: early-adolescent middle-and upper middle-class suburban girls."

== History ==
=== 20th century ===
Teen-oriented popular music had become common by the end of the swing era, in the late 1940s, with Frank Sinatra being an early teen idol. However, it was the early 1960s that became known as the "golden age" for pop teen idols, who included Paul Anka, Frankie Avalon, Fabian, Lulu and Ricky Nelson. During the 1970s, one of the most popular preteen and teen-oriented acts was the Osmonds, where family members Donny and Marie both enjoyed individual success as well as success as a duo apart from the main family (Donny also recorded with his brothers as the Osmonds).

The first major wave of teen pop after the counter-culture of the 1960s and 1970s occurred in the mid to late 1980s, with artists such as Menudo, New Edition, Debbie Gibson, Tiffany, New Kids on the Block and Kylie Minogue. In the early 1990s, teen pop dominated the charts until grunge and gangsta rap crossed over into the mainstream in North America by late 1991. Teen pop remained popular in the United Kingdom with the boy band Take That during this period, until the mid-1990s when Britpop became the next major wave in the UK, eclipsing the style similar to how grunge did in North America.

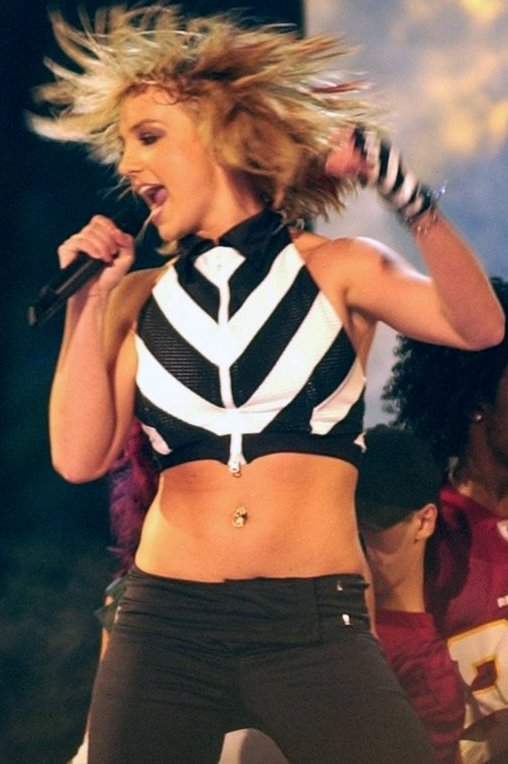
Britney Spears, pictured in 2003, is credited for revitalizing the genre with her best-selling debut and sophomore studio albums, earning her the title of Princess of Pop.

In 1996, British girl group Spice Girls released their debut single "Wannabe", which made them major pop stars in the UK, as well as in the US the following year. In their wake, other teen pop groups and singers rose to prominence, including Hanson, the Backstreet Boys, *NSYNC, Robyn, All Saints, S Club 7, Five, B*Witched, and Destiny's Child. In 1999, the success of teenaged pop singers Britney Spears, Christina Aguilera, Jessica Simpson, and Mandy Moore marked the development of what AllMusic refers to as the "pop Lolita" trend, sparking the short careers of upcoming pop singers such as Willa Ford, Brooke Allison, Samantha Mumba, Jamie-Lynn Sigler, Mikaila, Amanda, Nikki Cleary and Kaci Battaglia. A significant influence on the late-1990s teen pop sound was Cheiron Studios in Stockholm, where producers including Denniz Pop and Max Martin developed what became known as the "Cheiron sound". The sound became prominent through Cheiron's work with teen-pop acts including the Backstreet Boys, NSYNC and Britney Spears.

In 2001, artists like Aaron Carter, Swedish group A-Teens, girl groups 3LW, Play, Eden's Crush and Dream and boy bands O-Town, B2K and Dream Street were teen pop artists who achieved success. In Latin America, successful singers and bands appealing to tweens and teens were Sandy & Junior, RBD and Rouge.

According to Gayle Ward, the demise of this late 1990s teen pop was due to:

- promotional oversaturation of teen pop music in the early 2000s;
- the public's changing attitude toward it, deeming teen pop as inauthentic and corporately produced;
- the transition of the pre-teen and teenage fanbase of these teen pop artists during 1997–1999 to young adulthood (and the accompanying changes in musical interests);
- a growing young adult male base classifying the music, especially boy band music, as effeminate, and
- other musical genres began increasing in popularity.

1990s and early 2000s teen pop artists eventually entered hiatuses and semi-retirements (*NSYNC, Dream, Destiny's Child) or changed their musical style, including the Backstreet Boys, Britney Spears, Christina Aguilera, Jessica Simpson, Mandy Moore, 3LW and Aaron Carter. Many teen artists starting incorporating genres such as pop rock, contemporary R&B and hip-hop. B2K were a hip-hop/pop/R&B group consisting of four teenage black boys, and were considered a boy band, though they were only active from 2000 to 2004. Their style of music was very different from other teenage artists, sounding more mature than the typical boy band, though all members were in their mid-teenage years at the time.

=== 21st century ===
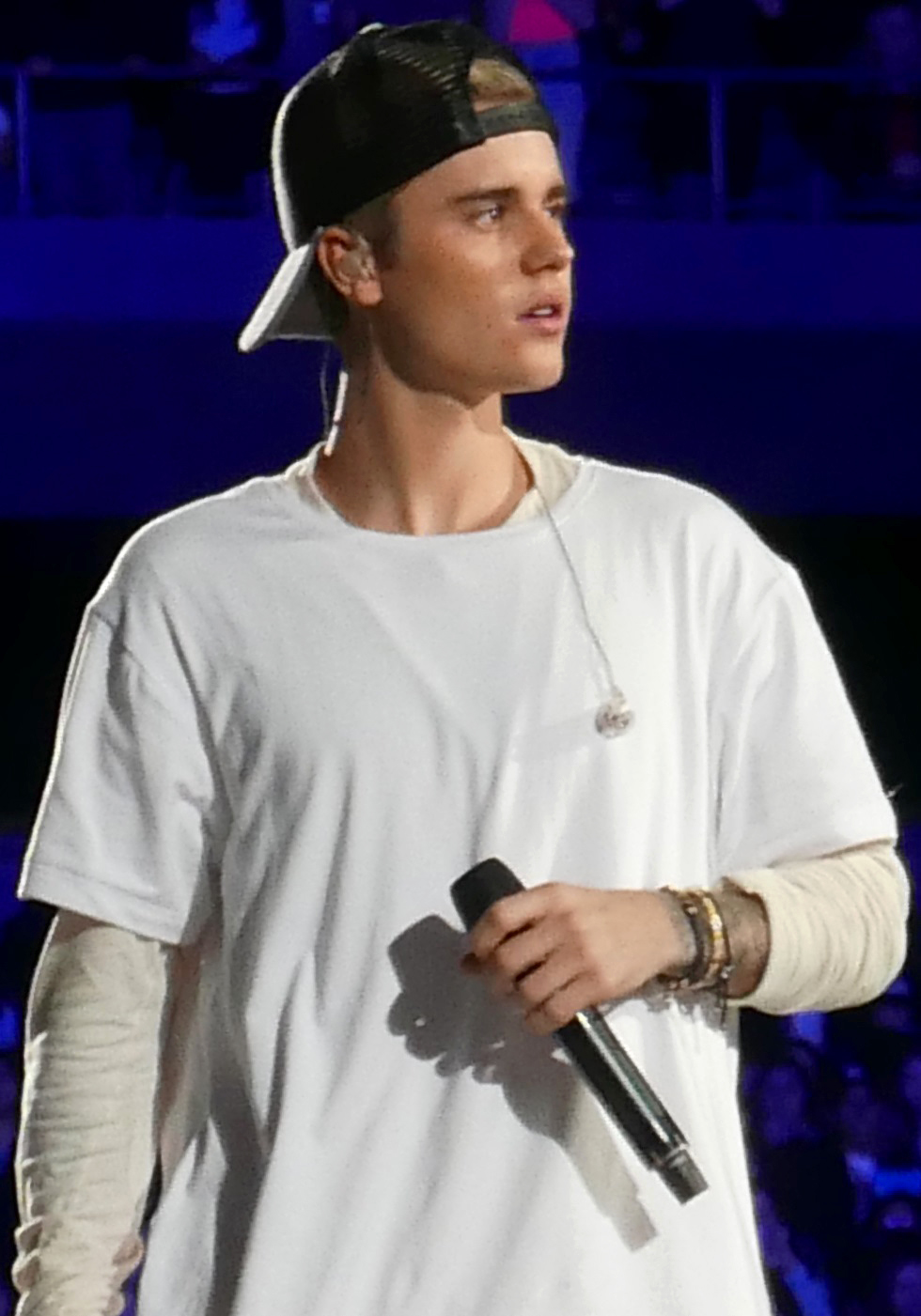
Justin Bieber is credited for creating a renewed interest in the genre and in the male teen idol with his debut EP My World. He is widely referred to as the Prince of Pop and the King of Teen Pop.

In the mid to late 2000s, teenage singers such as Rihanna and Chris Brown achieved success, indicating new relevance of teen-oriented pop music.

In 2005, AKB48 was created to promote idol culture and Japanese pop nationwide and overseas followed by the expansion of sister groups and rival groups locally and internationally over the years. In 2016, SNH48, as AKB48's second international sister group, announced its local Chinese sister groups like BEJ48, GNZ48, SHY48 and CKG48 to integrate idol culture with a Chinese twist.

The emergence of Canadian singer Justin Bieber created a renewed interest in teen pop, especially of the traditional male teen idol. With the release of his debut seven-track EP My World on December 5, 2009, he became the first artist to have seven songs from a debut album chart on the Billboard Hot 100. Since his debut, Bieber has played a key role in influencing modern popular culture and has sold over 150 million records worldwide, making him one of the best-selling artists of all time.

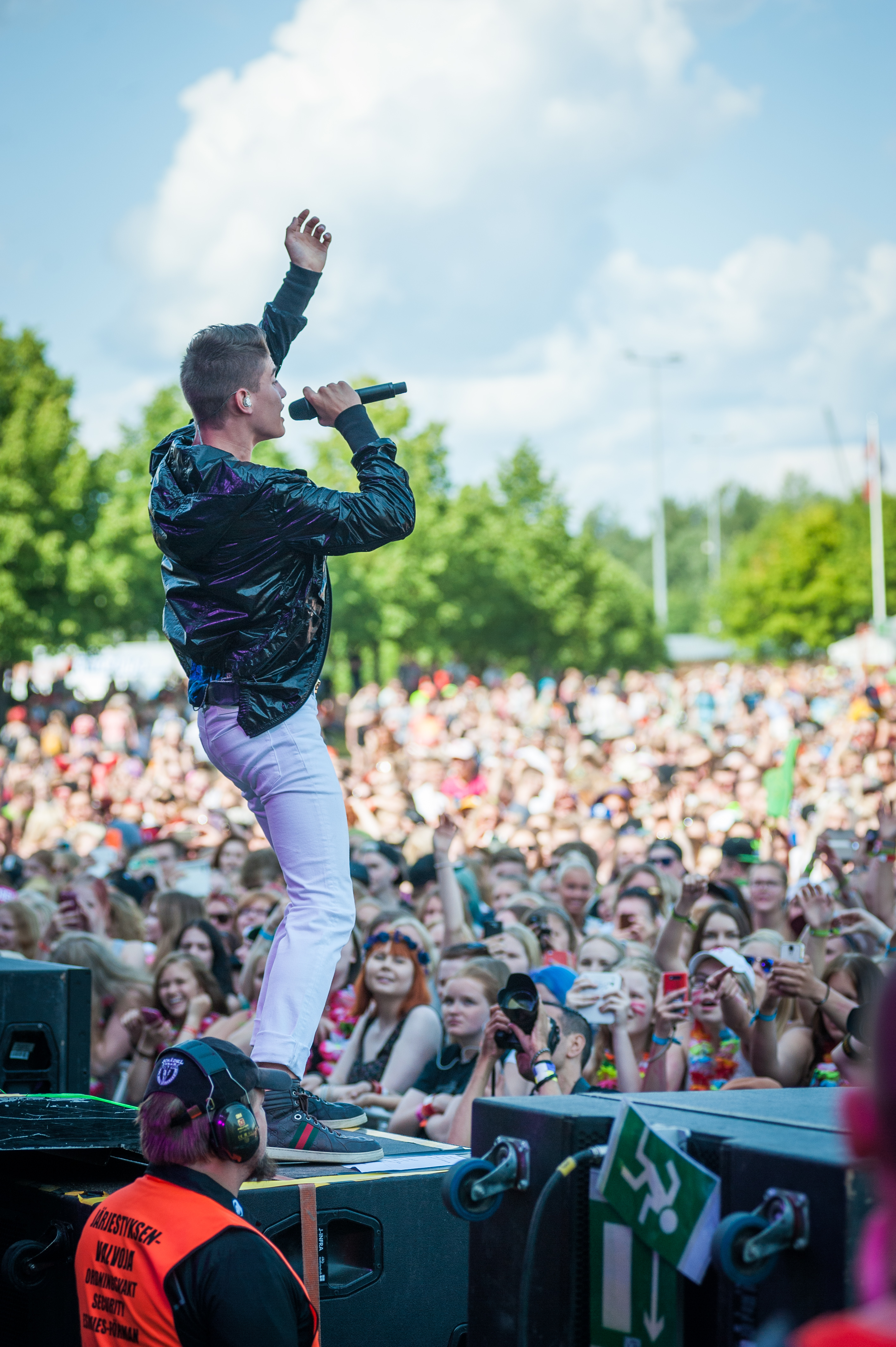
Finnish pop singer Robin Packalen performing at the 2015 Ilosaarirock Festival in Joensuu, Finland

Taylor Swift, an influential figure in contemporary teen pop music, emerged onto the scene as a teenage country artist in the mid-2000s and progressively transitioned to mainstream pop. She quickly became one of the most influential and highest-grossing artists of her generation with multiple Grammy Awards, best-selling album sales, and record-breaking hits. On top of her musical achievement, Swift also has an immense cultural impact, as she has been a vocal advocate for artists’ rights within the music industry. Her battle to regain the rights to her master recordings has influenced young artists such as Maggie Rogers, Ice Spice and Olivia Rodrigo to prioritize owning their music.

One Direction, a British-Irish boy band that formed on the UK version of ‘The X Factor’ in 2010, is the most profitable boy band of all time. Composed of members Liam Payne, Niall Horan, Louis Tomlinson, Harry Styles, and Zayn Malik, the group swiftly rose to colossal stardom after their debut and eventually became synonymous with the global trend of teen pop culture in the early 2010s, a phenomenon deeply rooted in the age of Twitter. One Direction’s fame ignited a fan frenzy among their predominantly female fan base to a magnitude such that it has been compared to the “Beatlemania” era of the 1960s. Building on the craze of American boy bands of the 1990s and early 2000s such as NSYNC, Backstreet Boys, and later the Jonas Brothers, the One Direction teen idols redefined the concept of the boy band and its legitimacy by shedding the image of the manufactured idol and embracing their authenticity. They created a new wave of the boy band genre that directly contributed to the emergence of other artists such as 5 Seconds of Summer. Despite their indefinite hiatus in 2015, One Direction has a cemented place in the annals of pop music history and its members continue to pursue solo music careers.

In 2010, the creation of Ark Music Factory helped contribute a new generation of teen pop artists via the Internet, such as Rebecca Black and Jenna Rose, despite major criticism with these artists due to the excessive use of auto-tune. As for Japanese teen pop culture, the category of "idol" was playing an important role. Momoiro Clover Z is ranked as number one among female idol groups according to 2013–2017 surveys.

By the late 2010s, K-pop artists such as BTS and Blackpink, attained international stardom in teen pop culture. Having sold over 4.7 million copies, Map of the Soul: 7 by BTS is the all-time best-selling album in South Korea. BTS is the first Asian and non-English-speaking act to be named International Federation of the Phonographic Industry (IFPI) Global Recording Artist of the Year (2020). The group was featured on Time's international cover as "Next Generation Leaders" in 2018 and are recognised as the "Princes of Pop".

In the 2020s, singer-songwriter Olivia Rodrigo has dominated the teen pop scene. Emerging as a teenage Disney star, she swiftly transitioned into pop music to draw from her personal experiences and weave narratives of love, heartbreak and self-exploration. Rodrigo's rise to fame can be attributed to her prominence on platforms such as TikTok, where she became viral after releasing her first single “Drivers License” in 2021. Alongside Rodrigo, singer-songwriter and dancer Tate McRae has achieved significant success with dance-pop and R&B influences. Emerging artists such as Sophie Powers and Elle Coves have also been releasing songs since the early 2020s that combine youthful themes with elements of teen pop and alternative music.

== See also ==
- Bobby soxer
- Teen drama – (List of teen dramas)
- Teen film – (List of teen films)
- Teen idol
- Teen magazine – (List of teen magazines)
- Teen sitcom – (List of teen situation comedies)
- Teenybopper
- Youth culture
