= Huang Enru =

Female Chinese singer and actress

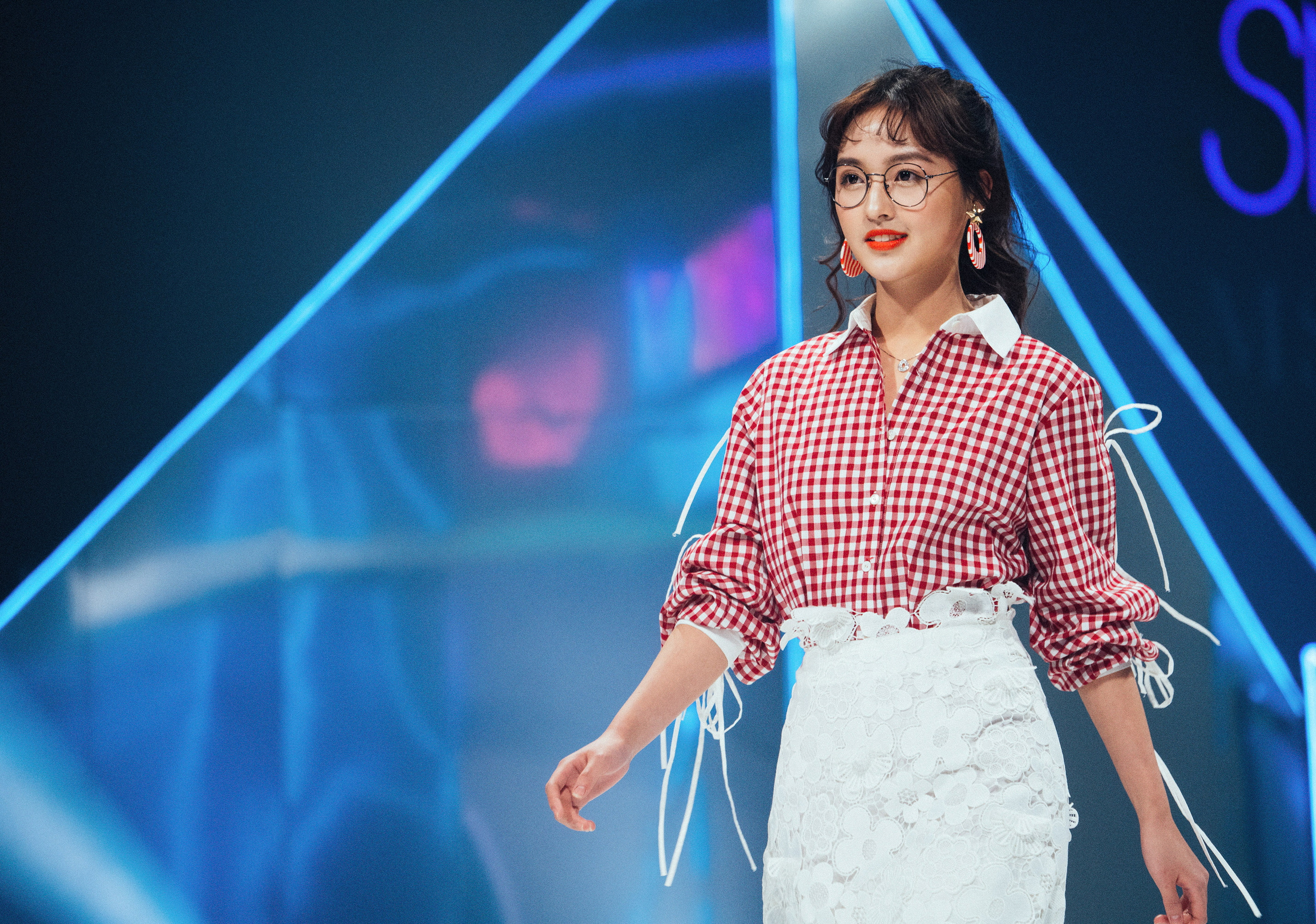
- Born: May 5, 1997 (age 27); Wenzhou, Zhejiang, China
- Education: Communication University of China
- Occupation(s): Singer, actress
- Years active: 2016-present

Chinese name
- Traditional Chinese: 黃恩茹
- Simplified Chinese: 黄恩茹
Transcriptions
Standard Mandarin
- Hanyu Pinyin: Huáng ĒnRú
- Musical career
- Origin: China
- Genres: Bel canto, Pop, Mandopop
- Instrument: Vocals
- Labels: Star48; Ninestyle Model Agency; Ninestyle Music

Huang Enru (simplified Chinese: 黄恩茹; traditional Chinese: 黃恩茹; pinyin: Huáng ĒnRú; born May 5, 1997, in Wenzhou, Zhejiang, China) is a Chinese singer and actress, and member of Chinese idol group SNH48's Team SII and a former member of BEJ48's Team J.

== Career ==
=== BEJ48 and SNH48 ===
On July 16, 2016, Huang became a 1st-generation member of BEJ48, and on April 20, she became a member of BEJ48's Team J. On Oct 29, she made her first public performance during Team J's first stage, "Exclusive Party".

On July 29, 2017, during SNH48's fourth General Election, Huang came in 10th within BEJ48, becoming part of BEJ48's Top 16.

On July 28, 2018, during SNH48's fifth General Election, Huang came in 38th in SNH48 Group and in 7th within BEJ48.

On July 27, 2019, during SNH48's sixth General Election, Huang came in 41st in SNH48 Group and in 8th within BEJ48.

On September 9, 2020, she was transferred to SNH48 Team SII.

=== Produce Camp 2020 ===
In 2020, Huang participated as a contestant on the Chinese competition variety show series Chuang 2020 (also known as Produce Camp 2020). Throughout the show, her rankings, in order of episodes, were: 36th, 32nd, 46th, 32nd, 42nd, until she was eliminated on episode 7 in 42nd place overall.

== Discography ==
=== With SNH48 ===
==== Albums ====
Year	No.	Title	Role	Notes
2022	2	One-of-a-Kind Inspiration	B-side	"My Stage" (我的舞台) with Team SII; First SNH48 Album

==== EPs ====
Year	No.	Title	Role	Notes
2017	16	Summer Pirates	B-side	"Heart of the Puzzle" (心的拼图) with Team J
2017	17	Dawn in Naples	B-side	"My Heart Soars" (我心翱翔) with SNH48 Group
2017	18	Sweet Festival	B-side	"First Wish" (最初的祝愿) with BEJ48
2018	20	Forest Theorem	B-side	"Jump Up" (跳起来) with BEJ48
2018	21	Endless Story	B-side	"Sky Letter" (天空信) with Next Girls; Ranked #38 in the 5th General Election
2018	22	NOW AND FOREVER	B-side	"Happy Wonder World" (新年这一刻) with BEJ48
2019	24	Dream in a Summer	B-side	"Hear the Melody of Love" (听见爱的旋律) with BEJ48
2019	25	Poetry About Time	B-side	"Have You" (有你) with Next Girls; Ranked #41 in the 6th General Election

=== With BEJ48 ===
==== EPs ====
Year	No.	Title	Role	Notes
2017	2	Smiling Sunflower	A-side & B-side	"Smiling Sunflower" (微笑的向日葵) with BEJ48 "Winter Love" (冬季恋) with Team J (Center)
2017	3	Manifesto	A-side; B-side	"Manifesto" (宣言) with BEJ48 "Little Lucky Star" (小幸运星) with Team J "Glory Medal" (荣耀勋章) with BEJ48
2017	4	Variety Amazing Number	A-side; B-side	"Variety Amazing Number" (百变惊叹号) with BEJ48 "Irreplaceable" (不可替代) with BEJ48 "Journey" (旅途) with Team J (Center)

== Filmography ==
=== Films ===
Year	Title	Role	Notes
2017	Fairy Tale of Love	Ji Shi	Supporting Role

=== TV series ===
Year	Title	Role	Notes
2020	Produce Camp 2020 (创造营 2020)	Contestant	Final Rank: 42

== Stage Units ==
=== BEJ48 ===
Stage No.	Song	Notes
Team J 1st Stage "Exclusive Party"	"Puppet" (木偶)	Solo
Team J 1st Waiting Stage "Fantasy Coronation"	"The Night Wind's Deed" (都是夜风惹的祸)	Center; With Ge Siqi and Lan Hao
Team J 2nd Stage "HAKUNA MATATA"	"Waiting for Wings" (期待之翼) "Siren" (塞壬) "Four Seasons of Love" (四季的爱恋)	Waiting for Wings - with Ren Xinyi, Ye Miaomiao, Fang Lei, Liu Xian, Jin Luosai (Center); Siren - with Sun Yushan and Jin Luosai (Center); Four Seasons of Love - Solo

=== SNH48 ===
Stage No.	Song	Notes
Team SII 8th Stage "Plan Salvation" (New Team SII Version)	"Interpreter" (解语者)	Center; With Jiang Yun and Wang Qiuru
