= Chen Qiannan =

Chinese singer and actress (born 1998)

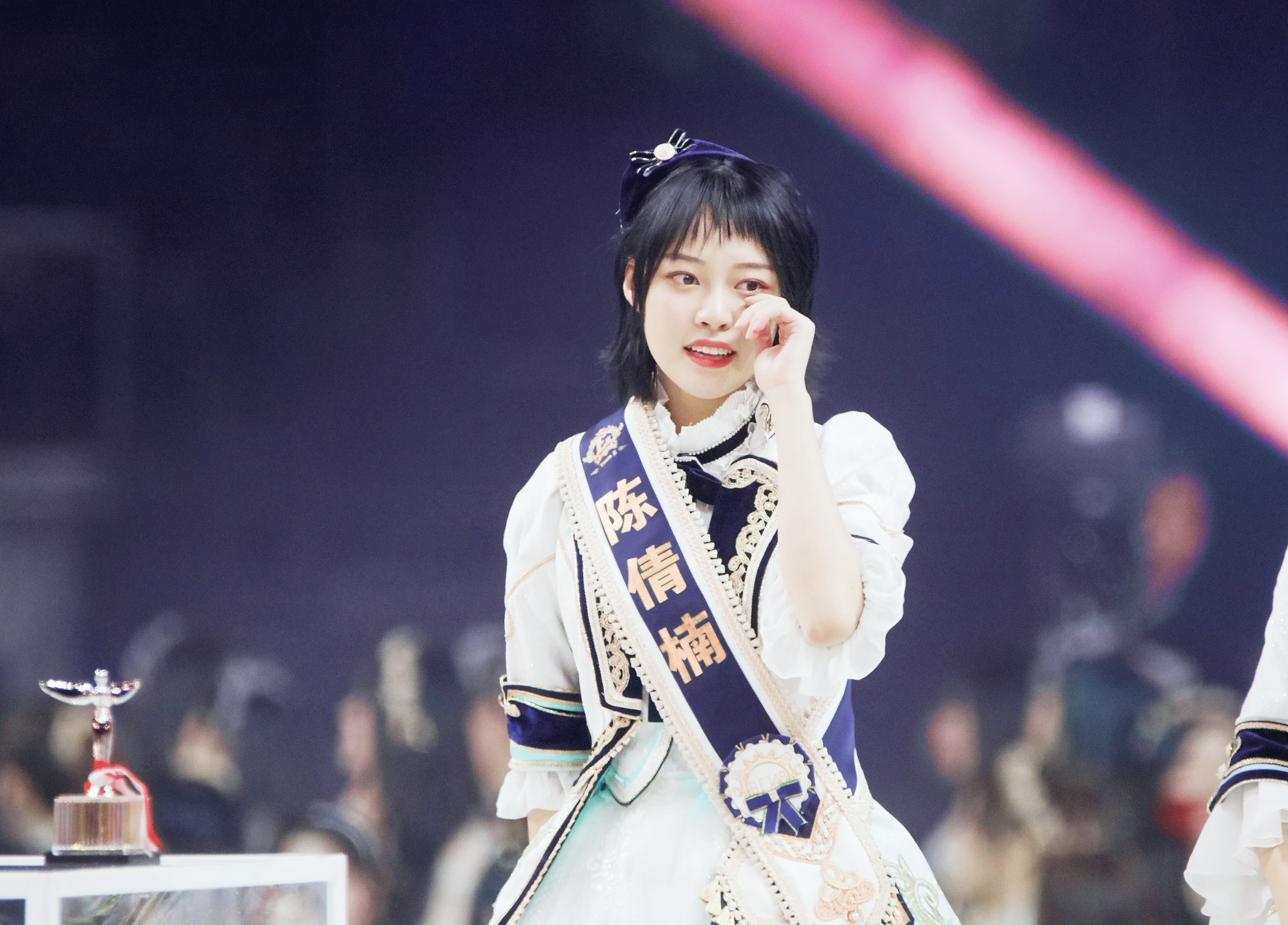
- Chen Qiannan during SNH48's fifth General Election in July 2018
- Born: March 19, 1998 (age 27); Tianjin, China
- Occupation(s): Singer, actress
- Years active: 2016-present

Chinese name
- Traditional Chinese: 陳倩楠
- Simplified Chinese: 陈倩楠
Transcriptions
Standard Mandarin
- Hanyu Pinyin: Chén Qiànnán
- Musical career
- Origin: China
- Genres: Pop, Mandopop
- Instrument: Vocals
- Labels: Star48; Ninestyle Model Agency; Ninestyle Music

Chen Qiannan (Chinese: 陈倩楠; born March 19, 1998, in Tianjin, China) is a Chinese singer and actress, and former member of Chinese idol group SNH48's Team NII and BEJ48's Team E.

== Career ==
=== SNH48 and BEJ48 ===
On January 18, 2016, Chen became a 6th-generation member of SNH48, and on April 20, she was transferred to BEJ48's Team E. On April 29, she made her first public performance as a member of BEJ48 during Team E's first stage, "Pajama Drive".

On July 29, 2017, during SNH48's fourth General Election, Chen came in 15th within BEJ48, becoming part of BEJ48's Top 16. On July 28, 2018, during SNH48's fifth General Election, Chen came in 37th in SNH48 Group and in 6th within BEJ48.

On July 27, 2019, during SNH48's sixth General Election, Chen came in 48th in SNH48 Group and in 10th within BEJ48.

On August 5, 2020, during SNH48's seventh General Election, Chen came in 37th in SNH48 Group and in 6th within BEJ48

On September 4, 2020, Chen was transferred to SNH48's Team NII due to the temporary disbandment of BEJ48.

=== Produce Camp 2020 ===
In 2020, Chen joined Chinese competition variety show series Chuang 2020 (also known as Produce Camp 2020) as a contestant. Her rankings in order of episode were: 19th, 21st, 34th, 26th, 25th, 19th, 24th, until she was eliminated on episode 9 in 25th place overall.

== Discography ==
=== With SNH48 ===
==== Albums ====
Year	No.	Title	Role	Notes
2022	2	One-of-a-Kind Inspiration	B-side	"All the Youth's Together" (青春不散) with Team NII; First SNH48 Album

==== EPs ====
Year	No.	Title	Role	Notes
2016	13	Princess's Cloak	B-side	"Love of the Spacious Items" (爱的敝项) with Team E and Team B First SNH48 EP
2017	16	Summer Pirates	B-side	"Too Much Ice Cream" (非常 ice cream) with Team E
2017	17	Dawn in Naples	B-side	"My Heart Soars" (我心翱翔) with SNH48 Group
2017	18	Sweet Festival	B-side	"First Wish" (最初的祝愿) with BEJ48
2018	20	Forest Theorem	B-side	"Jump Up" (跳起来) with BEJ48
2018	21	Endless Story	B-side	"Sky Letter" (天空信) with Next Girls; Ranked #37 in the 5th General Election
2018	22	NOW AND FOREVER	B-side	"Happy Wonder World" (新年这一刻) with BEJ48
2019	24	Dream in a Summer	B-side	"Hear the Melody of Love" (听见爱的旋律) with BEJ48
2019	25	Poetry About Time	B-side	"Have You" (有你) with Next Girls; Ranked #48 in the 6th General Election
2020	28	F.L.Y	B-side	"Future" (不問將來) with Next Girls; Ranked #37 in the 7th General Election; First SNH48 EP as Team NII

=== With BEJ48 ===
==== EPs ====
Year	No.	Title	Role	Notes
2016	1	The Awaking	A-side; B-side	"The Awaking" (元气觉醒) with Team E and Team B "You My Angel" (咪你天使) with Team E (Center) "Hello! Mr. Future" with Team E First BEJ48 EP
2017	2	Smiling Sunflower	B-side	"Silver and White Melody" (银白色旋律) with Team E
2017	3	Manifesto	A-side; B-side	"Manifesto" (宣言) with BEJ48 "Love Card" (爱心储蓄卡) with Team E "Glory Medal" (荣耀勋章) with BEJ48
2017	4	Variety Amazing Number	A-side; B-side	"Variety Amazing Number" (百变惊叹号) with BEJ48 "Irreplaceable" (不可替代) with BEJ48 "Gift" (禮物) with Team E
2019	5	Once Upon the Light of Dawn	A-side; B-side	"Once Upon the Light of Dawn" (晨曦下的我们) with BEJ48 "Deep Sea Sound" (深海之声) with Luo Hanyue and Lu Jing

== Filmography ==
=== Films ===
Year	Title	Role	Notes
2017	Fairy Tale of Love	Xiao Xiao Xiao	Supporting Role

=== TV series ===
Year	Title	Role	Notes
2020	Produce Camp 2020	Contestant	Final Rank: 25

== Stage Units ==
=== BEJ48 ===
Stage No.	Song	Notes
Team E 1st Stage "Pajama Drive"	"Pajama Drive" (不眠之夜)	With Ma Yuling and Li Xiang
Team E 2nd Stage "Fantasy Coronation"	"Cinderella's Glass Phone" (灰姑娘的玻璃手机)	With Yi Yanqin
Team E 3rd Stage "Eclosion Into Butterflies"	"Rose's Secret"	Center; With Cheng Yulu and Xu Siyang

=== SNH48 ===
Stage No.	Song	Notes
Team NII 8th Stage "Eclosion Into Butterflies"	"Love Me Love Me"	Center; With Hu Xiaohui and Zhao Jiarui
