= BEJ =

Bej or BEJ may refer to:

- Bey, an Ottoman title
- 13258 Bej, a minor planet
- bej, ISO 639-3 code for the Beja language
- Jakarta Stock Exchange (Indonesian: Bursa Efek Jakarta)

== See also ==
- BEJ48, a Chinese idol group
