= Tang Anqi =

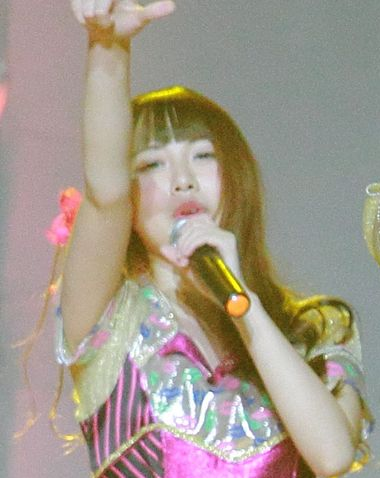
- Tang in 2015
- Born: September 7, 1992 (age 33); Huangshi, Hubei, China
- Occupation: Singer
- Years active: 2013–2016 (hiatus)

Chinese name
- Traditional Chinese: 唐安琪
- Simplified Chinese: 唐安琪
Transcriptions
Standard Mandarin
- Hanyu Pinyin: Táng Ānqí
- Musical career
- Origin: China
- Genres: Pop, Mandopop
- Instrument: Vocals
- Labels: Star48; Ninestyle Model Agency; Ocean Butterflies Music
- Member of: SNH48 (hiatus)

Tang Anqi (Chinese: 唐安琪, born 7 September 1992 in Huangshi) is a Chinese singer and a former member of the girl group SNH48.

On March 1, 2016, she suffered severe burn injuries on 80% of her body due to a fire in a cafe near the Wanda Plaza, Baoshan District, Shanghai, China. As of April 2016, she is regularly undergoing surgeries and skin grafts. At first, news sources reported that she lit herself on fire but recent sources are saying that someone else did in an act of attempted murder. It was later confirmed that she was covered in oil and set on fire; it is believed the perpetrator is a fan named "Miyamoto", a girl who is the leader of one of Tang's larger fanclubs, although no arrest has been made as of 14 September 2016.

== Discography ==
=== With SNH48 ===
==== EPs ====
Year	No.	Title	Role	Notes
2014	4	"Heart Electric"	B-side	
2014	5	"UZA"	B-side	
2015	6	"Give Me Five!"	B-side	
2015	7	"After Rain"	B-side	
2015	8	"Manatsu no Sounds Good!"	B-side	
2015	9	"Halloween Night"	B-side	
2015	10	"New Year's Bell"	B-side	
2016	11	"Engine of Youth"	B-side	First original EP

==== Albums ====
- Mae Shika Mukanee (2014)

== Units ==
=== SNH48 stage units ===
Stage No.	Song	Notes
Team NII 2nd Stage "Saka Agari"	"Ai no Iro" (爱的颜色)	With Huang Tingting, Lin Siyi, Dong Yanyun, Yi Jia'ai and Zeng Yanfen
Team NII 3rd Stage "Mokugekisha"	"Saboten to Gold Rush" (仙人掌与淘金热)	With Dong Yanyun, Gong Shiqi, Huang Tingting, He Xiaoyu and Lin Siyi
Team NII 4th Stage "Boku no Taiyou"	"Idol Nante Yobanaide" (专属偶像)	With Wan Lina, Zeng Yanfen and Zhang Yuxin

=== Concert units ===
Year	Date	Name	Song	Notes
2013	16 November	Guangzhou Concert	None	
2014	18 January	Red and White Concert	None	
2014	26 July	SNH48 Sousenkyo Concert in Shanghai	"Nakinagara Hohoende" (流着泪微笑)	With Xu Chenchen
2015	31 January	Request Hour Setlist Best 30 2015	"Saboten to Gold Rush" (仙人掌与淘金热)	With Gong Shiqi, Huang Tingting, He Xiaoyu, Dong Yanyun and Lin Siyi
2015	25 July	2nd General Election Concert	None	
2015	26 December	Request Hour Setlist Best 30 2015 (2nd Edition)	"16nin Shimai no Uta" (16人姐妹歌) "Kuroi Tenshi" (黒天使) "Romance Kakurenbo" (恋爱捉迷藏)	With Lu Ting and Zhao Yue; With Liu Jiongran and Xu-Yang Yuzhuo; Solo song
