= SNH48 =

Chinese girl group

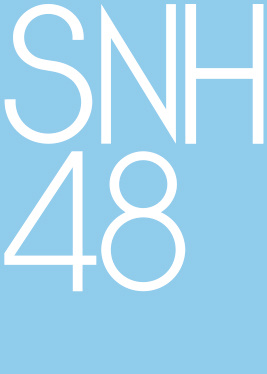

Background information
- Origin: Shanghai, China
- Genre: Mandopop
- Years active: 2012–present
- Labels: Ninestyle Model Agency; Ninestyle Music; Shanghai Star48 Culture & Media Co. Ltd.
- Member of: SNH48 Group
- Formerly of: AKB48 Group
- Members: SNH48 members
- Website: www.snh48.com

SNH48 is a Chinese idol girl group based in Shanghai, China. Following AKB48's creator Yasushi Akimoto's concept of "idols you can meet", the group features over 200 female members around the age of 20 (12 to 30) across SNH48 and all its sister groups including GNZ48, BEJ48, CKG48, CGT48 and IDOLS Ft, who perform regularly in the group's own theater and interact with fans predominantly via the official Pocket48/口袋48 App online and offline via theater and handshake events. The group is owned by Chinese companies NineStyle and Star48, commonly known as SIBA. Established in 2012, it parted ways with AKB48's groups in June 2016.

== History ==
=== 2012–2013: Creation and debut ===
On April 21, 2012, AKS Co., Ltd. and Chinese company Ninestyle jointly announced the establishment of SNH48. A theater was built in Shanghai beginning in October.

In January 2013, SNH48 debuted in the show "Give Me Power!", with 16 selected members on stage performing the Chinese version of "Heavy Rotation", "River" and "Ponytail to Shushu". In April MV "River" was released and the group participated in the "2013 Shanghai Strawberry Music Festival". In June the video for "Let's Become Cherry Blossom Trees" was released, as well as their first EP, Heavy Rotation (traditional Chinese: 無盡旋轉; simplified Chinese: 无尽旋转; pinyin: Wújìn Xuánzhuǎn). That same month the group performed overseas for the first time, at the Singapore "Asia Style Collection" Show with AKB48. In July the video for "Ponytail and Scrunchie" was released, and a month later their second EP, Flying Get (飛翔入手; 飞翔入手; Fēixiáng rùshǒu) and SNH48's theater, the Star Dream theater, was opened. In September SNH48 announced the result of their second audition, and 31 new members were added into the group. Mariya Suzuki and Sae Miyazawa made their theater debut in October, after receiving working visas in China. In November the group held a concert in Guangzhou with an audience of 10,000, and released a third EP, Fortune Cookie of Love. In December SNH48 signed up for China's Got Talent (5th season).

=== 2014–2015: Mae Shika Mukanee ===
On January 18, 2014, SNH48 held their first and only "Kouhaku Utagassen" (红白歌会) in Shanghai, of which Team SII won. Meanwhile, they began their third generation member audition. On March 12, they released their fourth EP, Heart Electric (心电感应). On May 10, they released their first album, Mae Shika Mukanee (一心向前), in digital form, at the same time kick-starting voting for their first General Election. The physical copy was released one week later. During the first General Election held on July 26, Wu Zhehan emerged as winner, becoming the center for their next EP. Meanwhile, 30 third-generation members were announced. On August 8, auditions for fourth-generation members kick-started. On August 21, it was announced that the theater would be closed shortly for an upgrade. It would reopen on September 5, with a special stage by the Top 16 of 2014. During this stage, most third-generation members were allocated to Team HII, with some allocated to Team SII and Team NII. On October 12, they released their fifth EP, UZA. Its music video was shot in South Korea. Between December 18–28, Team SII and Team NII took a national tour, which included five major cities, Beijing, Nanjing, Hangzhou, Guangzhou and Shenzhen.

On January 15, 2015, SNH48 released their sixth EP, Give Me Five! (青春的约定). On January 31, they held their first Request Time, of which the songs performed at this event were determined by televoting. 18 fourth-generation members were announced during the event, all of whom would be assigned to Team X on April 17. On March 18, auditions for fifth-generation members kick-started. On March 28, they released their seventh EP, After Rain (雨季之后). On May 15, they released their eight EP, Manatsu no Sounds Good! (盛夏好声音), which has its music video shot in Saipan. The EP included ballots for SNH48's second General Election. On June 22, their first documentary, Documentary of SNH48: Girls of Babel Tower was released. During the General Election of the year, held on July 25 at the Mercedes-Benz Arena, Shanghai, Zhao Jiamin was crowned winner. 43 fifth-generation members were announced at the event. On October 12, they released their ninth EP, Halloween Night (万圣节之夜), which had its music video filmed in Paris, France and Prague (Charles Bridge), Czech Republic and Sychrov (Sychrov Castle), Czech Republic. On October 31, SNH48 held its first "SNH48 Fashion Awards" (SNH48年度风尚大赏) at the Redtown in central Shanghai. It was the first of its kind within AKB48 and its sister groups. On November 18, it was announced that the 36 fifth-generation members will be split into Teams A and B from the first stage performance on December 4. On December 4, the fifth-generation members were promoted to Team XII. On December 22, it was announced that members in Team XII would hold concurrent positions with Teams SII, NII, HII and X. On December 26, they held their second Request Time. On December 8, they released their tenth EP, New Year's Bell (新年的钟声).

=== 2016: Parting ways with AKB48, original releases ===
On January 18, 2016, SNH48 released their mini-movie Soulvenir. On March 3, Tang Anqi, was the victim of attempted murder by being set on fire at a coffee shop in Shanghai and suffered severe burns on 80% of her body. Evidence pointed towards a member of her fanclub, who poured oil over her during an argument. SNH48 began its move towards originality by placing more emphasis on original material, starting from the release of their 11th EP, Engine of Youth (源动力) on March 25. On March 26, they announced the first batch of 11 sixth-generation members. On April 20, SNH48's management company, Star48, announced the formation of two sister groups, BEJ48, based in Beijing, and GNZ48, based in Guangzhou, as well as the formation of three new sub-units, Color Girls, 7SENSES and ElectroEyes Girls. Auditions for SNH48 seventh-generation members and BEJ48 and GNZ48 first-generation members were also kick-started. On May 20, SNH48 released their 12th and second original EP, Dream Land (梦想岛), which in its first time included BEJ48 and GNZ48 members. It includes ballots for SNH48's third General Election, and its music video was shot in Mauritius. Meanwhile, original stages were put up by various teams, starting from Team SII's "Journey of the Heart" on May 20 and Team NII's "Exclusive Party" on July 22.

On June 1, SNH48 released its second documentary, Documentary of SNH48: Taking Off Together (SNH48 比翼齐飞) for its third General Election. On June 9, AKB48 removed all SNH48-related content on their website, declaring the group to be fully independent, after violating a contract. Overseas transfer member Mariya Suzuki's concurrent position was also removed. On June 10, SNH48 management side insisted that they were an independent unit from the start and were never a sub-unit of AKB48, and there was never a contract to begin with. On the same day, AKB48 removed Mariya Suzuki's concurrent position with SNH48, and SNH48-related materials were removed from JKT48's website. The next day, according to a report by Southern Metropolis Entertainment Weekly, AKB48 founder Kotaro Shiba made a call to the SNH48 management, saying that he fully understood and supported SNH48's move towards originality. SNH48 held its third General Election on July 30 at the Mercedes-Benz Arena, with Ju Jingyi emerging as winner with 230,752.7 votes. During this event, a fourth sister group, SHY48, was announced. On August 14, the SNH48 management company announced that there will be stricter checks on the members of SNH48 and its sister groups. As a result, two fifth-generation members of Team SII and two sixth-generation members of Team NII were dismissed from the group.

On September 15, during the Mid-Autumn Special Stage, 13 seventh-generation members were announced. Meanwhile, SNH48 Team X's Yan Mingjun is transferred to Team B due to academic reasons. On October 12, they released their 13th EP, Princess's Cloak (公主披风). The title track's music video was shot in Madrid, Spain while the music videos for "Romantic Melody" and "A Yo Ai Yo" were shot in South Korea. On October 29, Team X began its third stage, "The Flag Of The Dream". On November 1, auditions are held for SNH48 eighth-generation members, BEJ48 second-generation members, GNZ48 second-generation members and SHY48 second-generation members, the first ever at a global scale. On November 5, they held their second Fashion Awards at the Shanghai World Expo Exhibition and Convention Center, and introduced their own fashion label, "Idol's Generation". On November 13, Team HII captain Wang Lu announced that she would leave SNH48 and resign from her position as captain, which is currently unconfirmed by the officials. If so, she would be the second SNH48 captain to leave, and the first captain to leave voluntarily. On December 20, SNH48 released their 14th EP, Happy Wonder World (新年这一刻).

=== 2017: After parting ways with AKB48, new sister groups ===
On January 7, 2017, SNH48 held their third "Request Time". On January 12, SNH48's sister group in Shenyang, SHY48, was formed, and they held their first performance in the newly opened SHY48 theatre. Meanwhile, they held the "SNH48 4th Anniversary Concert" at the Shanghai World Expo Exhibition Hall 4, involving all first-generation members as well as a few others from subsequent generations. It was later released in USB format on February 28. On January 27, some members performed on the CCTV New Year's Gala 2017 as backup dancers during a segment with Coco Lee and JJ Lin. This was their first performance at a major event to date. On March 17, they released their 15th EP, Each Other's Future (彼此的未来). On April 8, they held the "48 Idol Festival", with special stages held in all four theaters. Meanwhile, Team HII began its fourth stage, "Beautiful World", making the group and its sister groups' material fully original. On May 19, they released their 16th EP, "Summer Pirates", of which its title song involves SHY48 members for the first time, and its music video is shot in Australia. It includes ballots for SNH48's fourth General Election.

On June 2, Star48 held the launching ceremony for SNH48's fourth General Election, in which a sister group, CKG48, was announced. Meanwhile, SNH48 released its third documentary, Documentary of SNH48: My Heart Soars (SNH48 我心翱翔). On July 28, SNH48 held the 4th General Election Preheat Concert at the Mercedes-Benz Arena. During SNH48's fourth General Election held on July 29 at the same venue, Ju Jingyi won with 277781.3 votes. On the same day, auditions were held for SNH48 ninth-generation members, BEJ48, GNZ48 and SHY48 fourth-generation members and CKG48 second-generation members. Since August 25, SNH48 has been holding "Mini live" sessions at the SNH48 Café. From September 6 to 10, the group held a series of stages to commemorate the fourth anniversary of the SNH48 Theatre.

On September 25, during a meeting with several companies in Qingyang District, Chengdu, 11 Star48 projects were signed, and Wang Zijie announced that a fifth sister group, CGT48, is in the making. On October 7, Team NII held the first performance of its stage, "In the Name of Love". On October 19, they released their 13th EP, Dawn in Naples. On October 21, SNH48 held its first fan exchange event. On October 27, SNH48's sister group in Chongqing, CKG48, was formed, and they held a press conference in the newly opened CKG48 theatre. On November 11, Team NII held the first performance of a revamped version of their stage, "In the Name of Love 2.0". On November 16, SNH48 launched the pilot of their video game, Xingmeng Academy. On November 18, they held the third Fashion Awards at the Shanghai International Fashion Center. On December 3, auditions were held for SNH48 tenth-generation members, BEJ48, GNZ48 and SHY48 fifth-generation members and CKG48 third-generation members. On December 8, SNH48 Group held the first performance of its original musical, "The Shiny Star". On December 15, Team X held the first performance of their original stage, "Fate X". On December 24, SNH48 released their 18th EP, "Sweet Festival".

=== 2018–2020: Continuing expansion, Team Shuffle, venture towards other media ===
On February 2, 2018, SNH48 Group held their 4th Request Time Pre-Concert at the Mercedes-Benz Arena. During this event, Feng Xinduo and Lu Ting were announced as the members of sub-unit HO2 while Mo Han, Li Yuqi, Sun Rui, Wan Lina and Lü Yi were announced as members of sub-unit BlueV. On February 3, they held their fourth Request Time, in which they announced the results of their Team Shuffle. This event marked the disbandment of Team XII and the creation of Team FT, consisting of mainly ninth-generation members. The members and captains of the remaining four teams were announced, while a separate team consisting of trainees was created. On March 23, Team FT held the first performance of its first stage, "Dream Banner". On March 26, SNH48 released their 19th EP, "The Future Movement". On March 30, Team HII held the first performance of its waiting stage, "New H Stars", after putting their previous stage, "Beautiful World" on hold. On April 7, SNH48 held its first Idol Games, of which Team SII emerged as the overall champions. On April 18, auditions were held for SNH48 eleventh-generation members. On May 26, SNH48 kickstarted the "Unmask Plan" for its trainees, in which they attend regular performances while wearing masks. Fans can also vote for the trainees using their performance tickets.

On June 9, SNH48 Group held the launching ceremony for SNH48 Group's fifth General Election. During this event, it was announced that they have partnered with Sina Weibo in setting up the "SNH48 Election Chart", opening up another channel for fans to vote for their idols. Meanwhile, Pocket48 released the "Mate48" applet, based on WeChat mini-programs to run user-generated content campaigns. On the same day, they announced the release of their fourth documentary, Documentary of SNH48 Group: Go Ahead (砥砺前行). On June 29, SNH48 Group's management, Star48, opened a global audition to recruit youths to be trained to become artists. This recruitment is for SNH48 Group members, Korean-style idol trainees and Fashion Mina China actors. On July 10, Documentary of SNH48 Group: Go Ahead was first aired in the SNH48 Theater. On July 28, SNH48 Group held the fifth General Election at the Mercedes-Benz Arena, at which Li Yitong won with 402040.4 votes. During this event, it was announced that they would open its first Korean style training centre, and that SNH48 Group's annual Fashion Awards and Request Time would be held in Beijing and Guangzhou respectively.

On September 1, Team FT held the first performance of their stage, "Two-Faced Idol", the first time in which an SNH48 team performs a stage originally performed by one of its sister groups. On September 7, SNH48 Group held the launching ceremony for its fifth Request Time, which marked the debut of its sub-units HO2 and BlueV. On September 27, SNH48 Group officially became a member of China Association of Performing Arts. On October 10, they released their 21st EP, Endless Story. On October 27, SNH48 Group held their fourth Fashion Awards at the Beijing National Aquatics Center, in which BEJ48's Qing Yuwen came in first. Team NII debuted their stage "N·thE Wings" on November 2, while Team SII debuted their stage "Rebirth Plan" on November 23. SNH48 released their 22nd EP, Now and Forever on December 20.

On January 19, 2018, SNH48 Group held their fifth Request Time at the Guangzhou Gymnasium. During this event, a 7-member sub-unit, DeMoon, was announced, consisting of Xu Zixuan, Wu Zhehan, Yang Bingyi, Zhang Yi, Yuan Yiqi, Zhang Dansan and Zhang Qiongyu. The results for SNH48 Group's Team Shuffle were announced, including the launch of the overseas trainee program, where five members: Gao Chong, Li Jia'en, Wang Qiuru, Xu Jiayin and Zhou Ruilin, were selected to go to the overseas base for a two-year high-level closed training, and "IDOLS Ft", a system for idols to interact with fans through the Pocket 48 app. SNH48 Team Ft, SHY48 and CKG48 were dissolved. Meanwhile, auditions for SNH48 twelfth-generation members, BEJ48 and GNZ48 seventh-generation members and overseas trainees kickstarted.

On January 27, 2019, it was announced that Dai Meng and Mo Han would step down as captain and vice-captain of Team SII respectively, with Dai assuming the role of vice-captain while Qian Beiting was appointed as the new captain. On February 19, Star Palace member Ju Jingyi participated in the 2019 CCTV Lantern Festival Gala, marking the first time SNH48 Group has participated in such an event. On February 27, 7Senses debuted in South Korea. On April 13, SNH48 Group held its second Idol Games at the Shanghai Baoshan Gymnasium, in which Team HII emerged as the overall winner. On May 15, members Xu Jiaqi, Zhang Yuge and Xu-Yang Yuzhuo, together with Zhang Yixing and Unine, attended the Conference on Dialogue of Asian Civilizations. On May 25, they released their 25th EP, Dream In a Summer; on the same day they held auditions for SNH48 13th-generation members, BEJ48 eighth-generation members and GNZ48 eighth-generation members.On July 28, SNH48 Group held the sixth General Election at the Mercedes-Benz Arena, where Li Yitong won for a second time with 1483041.5 votes, making her the second member to be elevated to the Star Palace.

On September 14, they released their 26th EP, Poetry About Time; on that day they also held their sixth anniversary special stage and announced four 12th-generation members during this event. September 15 marked the debut of sub-unit DeMOON, the first with a distinct gothic concept. Teams NII and SII held their sixth anniversary stages on November 17 and November 29 respectively, and announced a total of three 13th-generation members, two of whom are assigned to Team SII and one assigned to Team NII. On December 21, they held their sixth Request Time at the Guangzhou Gymnasium. During this event, they announced that their seventh General Election would be the first one to be held in Guangzhou, though it did not happen due to the COVID-19 pandemic. On December 28, they released their 26th EP, Wings.

=== 2020–present: Involvement in reality shows and internal changes ===
On January 2, 2020, Star48 announced JNR48, a sister group created by Shanghai Xiaoyuan Art, which recruits girls between the ages of 6 and 14 who love to sing, dance and perform.

On January 15, Star48 announced that 10 SNH48 Group members would participate in iQIYI's reality show Youth With You 2, namely SNH48's Mo Han, Xu Jiaqi, Song Xinran, Dai Meng, Sun Rui, Fei Qinyuan, Xu-Yang Yuzhuo and Zhang Yuge, and BEJ48's Duan Yixuan and Su Shanshan. Xu Jiaqi would come in third during its finals aired on May 30, becoming a member of The9. On April 8, Star48 announced that 7 members would participate in Tencent Video's reality show Produce Camp 2020, namely SNH48's Zhao Yue, Sun Zhenni and Li Jia'en, BEJ48's Huang Enru, Chen Qiannan and Ma Yuling, and GNZ48's Chen Ke. Zhao Yue would come in second during its finals aired on July 4, becoming a member of BonBon Girls 303. On May 13, Star48 announced that 16 SNH48 Group members would be participating in Tencent Video's idol group competition show We Are Blazing; SNH48 Group would later be eliminated during the show's seventh episode.

On June 13, SNH48 Group released its 27th EP, Beautiful Day. On August 15, they held their seventh General Election at the Qizhong Forest Sports City Arena, the first without the participation of SNH48's first-generation members. Sun Rui came in first with 3533525 votes, while the second and third places went to Lu Ting and Song Xinran. On September 3, SNH48's first-generation members released their graduation EP, Take Me.

Star48 made a series of announcements through SNH48's official website on September 4. Due to the impact of the COVID-19 pandemic in Beijing, BEJ48 was facing financial difficulties after its theater was closed for a prolonged period. As such, half of BEJ48's members, especially those who ranked higher during SNH48 Group's General Election, were transferred to SNH48, while the remaining half would remain in Beijing, albeit without teams. Li Hui of Idols Ft and CKG48 was promoted to Team SII after ranking 31st, while Jiang Zhenyi, Wang Xinyantiantian and Zhang Jiayu were demoted to Idols Ft after ranking in the bottom 20. Some first-generation members have signed new contracts with Star48, they would continue their activities individually as models, actresses and members of its sub-units. Starting 2021, members who would reach the age of 29 by December 31 of that year will graduate from the group.

Between October 2 and 3, eight 14th-generation members were announced, with four assigned to Team SII and four assigned to Team X. From October 7–8, SNH48's first-generation members held their graduation concert at the Shanghai Oriental Art Center. On October 19, SNH48 Group released its 28th EP, F.L.Y, which stands for "Future", "Light", "Young".

On July 12, 2021, the contestants of Girls Planet 999 were revealed. The South Korean contestants (K-Group) were the first contestants to be revealed, followed by the Chinese contestants (C-Group) and the last group to be revealed were the Japanese contestants (J-Group). It was revealed that 2 SNH48 members, Ma Yuling and Wang Qiuru plus 2 GNZ48 members, who were the twins Liang Qiao and Liang Jiao would compete on Girls Planet 999.

== Discography ==
=== EPs ===
1. "Heavy Rotation" (Chinese: 无尽旋转; pinyin: Wújìn Xuánzhuǎn) – Released on June 13, 2013
2. "Flying Get" (飞翔入手; Fēixiáng rùshǒu) – Released on August 2, 2013
3. "Fortune Cookie of Love" (爱的幸运曲奇; Ài de xìngyùn qū qí) – Released on November 25, 2013 (Beijing) and November 29, 2013 (Shanghai)
4. "Heart Electric" (心电感应; Xīndiàn gǎnyìng) – Released on 12 March 2014
5. "UZA" (呜吒) – Released on October 12, 2014
6. "Give Me Five!" (青春的约定) – Released on January 15, 2015
7. "After Rain" (雨季之后) – Released on March 28, 2015
8. "Manatsu no Sounds Good!" (盛夏好声音) – Released on May 15, 2015
9. "Halloween Night" (万圣节之夜) – Released on October 12, 2015
10. "New Year's Bell" (新年的钟声) – Released on December 28, 2015
11. "Engine of Youth" (源动力) – Released on March 25, 2016
12. "Dream Land" (梦想岛) – Released on May 20, 2016
13. "Princess's Cloak" (公主披风) – Released on October 12, 2016
14. "Happy Wonder World" (新年这一刻) – Released on December 20, 2016
15. "Each Other's Future" (彼此的未来) – Released on March 17, 2017
16. "Summer Pirates" (夏日柠檬船) – Released on May 19, 2017
17. "Dawn in Naples" (那不勒斯的黎明) – Released on October 18, 2017
18. "Sweet Festival" (甜蜜盛典) – Released on December 20, 2017
19. "The future movement" (未来的乐章) – Released on March 26, 2018
20. "Forest Theorem" (森林法则) – Released on May 17, 2018
21. "Endless Story" (魔女的诗篇) – Released on October 12, 2018
22. "Now and Forever" (此刻到永远) – Released on December 20, 2018
23. Best 50 Special EP: "Our Journey" (我们的旅程) – Released on March 20, 2019
24. "Dream in a Summer" (那年夏天的梦) – Released on May 25, 2019
25. "Poetry About Time" (时间的歌) – Released on September 21, 2019
26. "Wings" (青春之翼) – Released on December 28, 2019
27. "Beautiful Day" (天晴了) – Released on June 13, 2020
28. First Generation Graduation EP: “Take Me” (爱) – Released on September 3, 2020
29. "F.L.Y (Future, Light, Young)" (F.L.Y成长三部曲) – Released on October 19, 2020
30. "Flipped" (怦然心动) – Released on May 26, 2021
31. "Floral and Firm" (花戎) – Released on October 13, 2021
32. "Sea Gravel" (海砂) – Released on June 25, 2022

=== Albums ===
1. "Mae Shika Mukanee" (一心向前) – Released on May 10, 2014

== Awards and nominations ==
Year	Ceremony	Award	Result
2013	6th Music Billboard New Artists' Awards Ceremony (第6届玉兰油北京音乐风云榜新人盛典)	Most Potential Group Award	Won
2014	21st Oriental Billboard (第21届东方风云榜)	Best New Artist	Won
2014	second Yinyuetai Awards (第二届音悦V榜年度盛典)	Best New Group (mainland China)	Won
2015	22nd Oriental Billboard (第22届东方风云榜)	Best Group	Nominated
2015	22nd Oriental Billboard (第22届东方风云榜)	Best Track of the Year	Nominated
2015	22nd Oriental Billboard (第22届东方风云榜)	Best Local Artist	Won
2015	WebTVAsia Awards 2015	Breakout Artist	Won
2016	23rd Oriental Billboard (第23届东方风云榜)	People's Choice Award	Won
2016	Freshasia Music Award (2016亚洲新歌榜)	Best Group	Won
2016	Freshasia Music Award (2016亚洲新歌榜)	Best Music Video	Won
2016	2016 Music Pioneer Awards (音乐先锋榜2016年度颁奖典礼)	Pioneer Most Popular Group	Won
2016	2016 Music Pioneer Awards (音乐先锋榜2016年度颁奖典礼)	Top 10 Tracks of the Year	Won
2017	2016 Shanghai Influence Award (2016上海影响力颁奖盛典)	Shanghai Influence Award	Won
2017	2017 Weibo Night Awards (2017微博之夜)	Most Popular Group	Won
2017	Chinese Music Network (中国音乐联播榜年度盛典)	Best Group of the Year	Won
2017	Chinese Music Network (中国音乐联播榜年度盛典)	Top 10 Songs	Won
2017	24th Oriental Billboard (第24届东方风云榜)	Breakout Group	Won
2017	24th Oriental Billboard (第24届东方风云榜)	Best Pop Collaboration	Won
2017	17th Top Chinese Music Awards (第17届音乐风云榜)	Group Receiving Most Attention	Won
2017	2017 China Youth Day Gala (激扬青春梦-2017年「5月的鲜花」五四青年节晚会)	Outstanding Youth	Won
2017	CNR MusicRadio Awards (中国TOP排行榜颁奖盛典)	All Media Choice Award – Group	Won
2018	Freshasia Music Award	Best Group	Won
2019	2019 Soribada Best K-Music Awards (2019 소리바다 어워즈)	Global Entertainer Award	Won
2020	QQ BOOM BOOM AWARDS 2020	Hottest Stage	Won

== Reception ==
According to the Financial Times, SNH48 is described as being "run more like a tech start-up than a musical group". Its strategy, which is modeled after AKB48's, involves teams of interchangeable singers, allowing to build generations of female stars and longer-lasting revenue streams. In May 2017, it is reported that they had raised more than $150 million from investors. SNH48's system is an expansion on the model used by AKB48, combining technology such as mobile applications to track a favorite idol with the traditional focus on voting for a favorite Idol.

In 2016 alone the group sold an estimated 2 million copies of their albums.
