= GNZ48 =

Chinese girl group

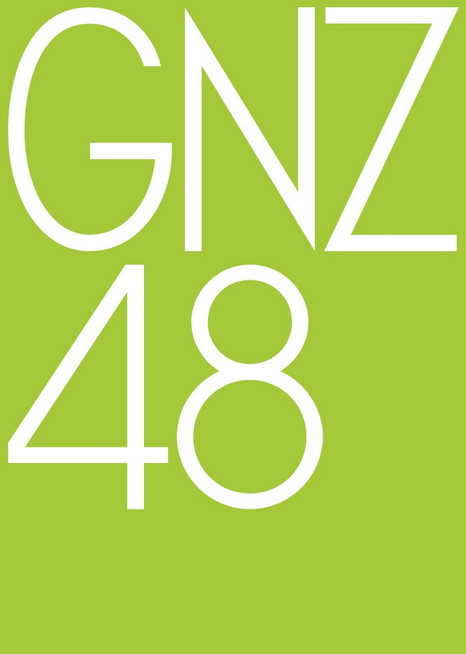
- GNZ48 logo

Background information
- Origin: Guangzhou, Guangdong, China
- Genres: Chinese Pop
- Years active: 2016–present
- Labels: Guangzhou Star48 Culture & Media Co. Ltd.
- Members: GNZ48 Members
- Website: www.gnz48.com

GNZ48 is a Chinese idol girl group established in Guangzhou, Guangdong in 2016. It is a sister group of SNH48, belonging to Guangzhou Star48 Culture Media Group Co., Ltd. GNZ48 currently has 51 members (45 regular members and 6 trainees, as of April 19, 2022, information reference from GNZ48 official website.) and is divided into Team G, Team NIII and Team Z. Like SNH48, they follow the AKB48's creator Yasushi Akimoto's concept of "idols you can meet".

== Overview ==
GNZ48 is one of the first two sister groups of SNH48 (the other is BEJ48). On April 20, 2016, Star48 Media held a press conference in Beijing to announce the establishment of the SNH48 sister groups BEJ48 and GNZ48, and launched the first phase of the GNZ48 recruitment campaign. GNZ48 officially became a girl idol group. GNZ48 is a girl idol group that conducts performing arts activities in Guangzhou which built on the “idols you can meet” concept by regularly organizing “handshake” events where fans can meet group members. Its theater is located at Zhongtai International Plaza in Tianhe District, Guangzhou, and opened on April 29, 2016. Its name is the abbreviation of "Guangzhou" Pinyin name. Its first members included some fifth- and sixth-generation members transferred from SNH48.

When GNZ48 was established, there were two teams, the Team G and Team NIII. Since GNZ48 is a sister group established by SNH48 brokerage company Star48, AKB48 operator AKS has not directly authorized SNH48, so GNZ48 is not included in the AKB48 Group (AKB48 issued a statement on June 9, 2016, that said that GNZ48 has nothing to do with AKB48, nor does it belong to AKB48 Group. The English name of the Team G and the Team NIII are not named in the order of the AKB48 group, but are directly named Team G and Team NIII (Note: In the AKB48 and other 48 series combinations, NMB48, SNH48 and NGT48 has established Team N, Team NII and Team NIII. If named in the order of the team, the Team NIII should be named Team NIV. At present, the Team N is named Team NIII, which means that it is behind the Team N (Team NII) of the sister group SNH48.). Team Z consists of 18 first-generation members of GNZ48, which was established on October 23, 2016.

== History ==
=== 2016 ===
On April 20, 2016, Star48 announced the establishment of SNH48's two sister groups, BEJ48 and GNZ48. At the same time, it started holding auditions for first-generation members. The GNZ48 Theatre opened on April 29, with Team Gnz holding its first performance of its 1st Stage, "Theater no Megami". Team NIII held its first performance of its 1st Stage, "Boku no Taiyou" on May 6.

On April 29, the special theater "GNZ48 Star Dream Theater" (Chinese: GNZ48 星梦剧院) officially opened; On the same day, Team G held the premiere of "Theatrical Goddess" performance.

On April 30, Team NIII premiered "My Sun" (Chinese: 我的太阳) performance.

On July 13, GNZ48 started their School Tour, similar in format to SNH48's School Tour.

On August 26, they held the "Love Music Wing Up" GNZ48 Dream Departure (Chinese: "爱音乐 翼起来" GNZ48梦想启航) Show Case Concert at Sun Yat-sen Memorial Hall.

On September 19, they released their debut EP, You Don't Know Me (Chinese: 你所不知道的我).

On October 1, Huang Lirong and Xiang Yun were added to Team G, and Zeng Aijia and Gao Yuanjing were appointed captain and vice-captain respectively.

On October 2,, Team NIII published the following on the special performance of National Day:

Dai Xinyi and Li Yihong were upgraded to members of Team NIII.

Liu Lifei was appointed as the first team leader of Team NIII and Liu Qianqian as the vice captain.

On October 14, Team G premiered the "Heart of the Heart" (Chinese: 心的旅程) performance.

On October 23, 18 first-generation members assigned to Team Z were announced.

On November 1, auditions were held for SNH48 eighth-generation members, BEJ48 second-generation members, GNZ48 second-generation members and SHY48 second-generation members.

On November 18, Team Z premieres the "Exclusive Party" (Chinese: 专属派对) performance.

=== 2017 ===
On January 16, 2017, GNZ48 released their 2, EP, BOOM! BOOM! BOOM!.

On March 24, Team NIII began its second stage, "First Person" (Chinese: 第1人称).

On April 8, they held the "GNZ48 Fan Culture Festival" (Chinese: GNZ48粉丝文化祭).

On April 13, they released their 3 EP, I.F.

On April 20, they held auditions for BEJ48, GNZ48 and SHY48 third-generation members.

On April 29, they announced 14 second-generation members during GNZ48's first anniversary.

On July 28, GNZ48 released their first documentary, Documentary of GNZ48: 7/48 (GNZ48 四十八分之七).

On July 29, GNZ48, along with SNH48, BEJ48, SHY48 and CKG48, held auditions for SNH48 ninth-generation, BEJ48, GNZ48 and SHY48 fourth-generation and CKG48 second-generation members.

On August 11, Team G began its third stage, "Two-Faced Idol" (Chinese: 双面偶像).

On September 15, Team Z premiered the performance of "Code, The west of LinHe" (Chinese: 代号·林和西).

On September 16, Team Z announced Nong Yanping as captain and Long Yirui as Vice-Captain; they also announced that the team's stage "Trigonometric function" (Chinese: 三角函数) will be held at the end of the year.

On September 23, they released their 4th EP, Say No. The title track's lyrics were written by members Feng Jiaxi and Luo Hanyue, and its music video was done as a collaboration with the Guangdong Southern Tigers.

On October 1, GNZ48 3 Generation trainee premiered the "Idol Research Program" (Chinese: 偶像研究计划) performance.

On October 30, GNZ48 and China Merchants Bank issued the 2017 Idol Annual Popularity Final Selection GNZ48 TOP3 members Liu Lifei, Xie Leilei, Zheng Danni Idol exclusive small idol savings card.

On November 23, six fourth-generation members were announced.

On December 3, GNZ48 combined with SNH48, BEJ48, SHY48, CKG48 began to recruit SNH48 ten-year students, BEJ48 five-year students, GNZ48 five-year students, SHY48 five-year students, CKG48 three-stage students.

On December 24, in conjunction with the SNH48 Group, the fifth EP "不见不散" was issued.

=== 2018 ===
On January 12, 2018, Team Z premiered the "Trigonometric Function" (Chinese: 三角函数) performance.

On March 28, in conjunction with the SNH48 Group, the 6th EP "抱紧处理" was issued.

On April 2, the Wolf Man killed the marathon in the SNH48 Group's exclusive Werewolf app "48 Werewolf Kill" (Chinese: 48狼人杀).

From April 6 to 8, the GNZ48 debut two-year anniversary photo album "你所不知道的…" is also the first GNZ48 photo book.

From April 27 to 30, together with BEJ48 in the SNH48 Group's exclusive werewolf killing APP "48 Werewolf Kill" (Chinese: 48狼人杀) held the "悠点泰度" large werewolf marathon competition, more than 100 members took turns in 48 days of marathon in 4 days Live match.

On April 29, the following issues were announced on the second anniversary of the theater:

Published and announced six five-phase generation;

Zeng Aijia and Gao Yuanjing resigned as team cap and vice captain of Team G, and Luo Hanyue took over, and the vice captain was to be determined;

Announced a new original performance "Miss.", Team G's "Victoria.G", Team NIII's "Fiona.N", Team Z's "Mia.Z".

On May 14, the GNZ48 operation announcement was announced. Since the recent behavior of GNZ48 member Zhu Yixin deviated from the basic idol image and spirit, it was decided that Zhu Yixin would be reduced to GNZ48 Trainee from now on.

On June 17, the recruitment of six-generation members began.

On June 29, SNH48 Group's operator Shanghai Siba Culture Media Group Co., Ltd. officially announced that it will open the first large-scale idol artist recruitment in the whole group to further promote the cultivation of new generation of high quality idols. The recruitment includes the recruitment of SNH48 Group members, Siba Media Group idol trainees (Korean model trainees) and Mina actor studio (film and television performers), not limited to men and women, selected players will receive professional artist training at home and abroad.

On July 6, Team NIII premiered the performance of "Fiona.N".

On July 20, the "double-sided idol: again and again" (Chinese: 双面偶像：又又) stage performance was officially launched.

On October 5, the following issues were published on the special performance of the Trainee "Idol Research Project":

Announced the release of four six-generation members;

On October 6, GNZ48 top 16 members held the "PVC Sisters Love" tour in Vientiane World Shenzhen.

On October 16, ex-member Du Yuwei committed suicide at the age of 19.

== Members ==
As of April 19, 2022, Information reference from GNZ48 official website.

=== Team G ===
- The representative color is Bright green.
- The current captain is Huang Chuyin, and the vice captain is Luo Kejia.

Name	Birth date (age)	Birthplace	Election rank					
Name	Birth date (age)	Birthplace	3	4	5	6	7	8
Chen Hongyu (Chinese: 陈泓宇; pinyin: Chén Hóngyǔ)	February 6, 2000 (age 26)	Chengdu, Sichuan						
Chen Ke (Chinese: 陈珂; pinyin: Chén Kē)	August 9, 1995 (age 30)	Zhangjiajie, Hunan	N/A	58	34	10	17	14
Fu Bingbing (Chinese: 符冰冰; pinyin: Fú Bīngbīng)	August 21, 1996 (age 29)	Guangdong			N/A	N/A	N/A	N/A
Huang Chuyin (Chinese: 黄楚茵; pinyin: Huáng Chǔyīn)	January 2, 2000 (age 26)	Zhongshan, Guangdong			N/A	N/A	N/A	N/A
Luo Hanyue (Chinese: 罗寒月; pinyin: Luó Hányuè)	April 27, 1996 (age 30)	Chongqing	N/A	N/A	N/A	N/A	N/A	N/A
Liang Jiao (Chinese: 梁娇; pinyin: Liáng Jiāo)	November 1, 2003 (age 22)	Chengdu, Sichuan				N/A	N/A	N/A
Luo Kejia (Chinese: 罗可嘉; pinyin: Luó Kějiā)	February 2, 2002 (age 24)	Chiayi, Taiwan			N/A	N/A	N/A	N/A
Li Shanshan (Chinese: 李姗姗; pinyin: Lǐ Shānshān)	April 8, 1998 (age 28)	Chengdu, Sichuan			CKG48 3	GNZ48 15	N/A	35
Lin Zhi (Chinese: 林芝; pinyin: Lín Zhī)	November 21, 1998 (age 27)	Jiangxi			N/A	N/A	N/A	N/A
Xu Chuwen (Chinese: 徐楚雯; pinyin: Xú Chǔwén)	October 26, 1999 (age 26)	Nanchang, Jiangxi			N/A	N/A	42	N/A
Ye Shuqi (Chinese: 叶舒淇; pinyin: Yè Shūqí)	October 25, 1999 (age 26)	Jiangxi				N/A	N/A	N/A
Zeng Aijia (Chinese: 曾艾佳; pinyin: Zēng Àijiā)	July 11, 1995 (age 31)	Chengdu, Sichuan	N/A	N/A	N/A	37	27	19
Zhang Qiongyu (Chinese: 张琼予; pinyin: Zhāng Qióngyǔ) (Note: A concurrent member of GNZ48 Team Gmz and SNH48 Team X.)	January 21, 1997 (age 29)	Taizhou, Zhejiang	GNZ48 7	62	61	38	18	13

=== Team NIII ===
- The representative color is Fresh yellow.
- The current captain is Wu Yufei and the vice captain is Liu Lifei.

Name	Birth date (age)	Birthplace	Election rank					
Name	Birth date (age)	Birthplace	3	4	5	6	7	8
Chen Nanxi (Chinese: 陈楠茜; pinyin: Chén Nánxī)	June 12, 1995 (age 31)	Sanmenxia, Henan	N/A	N/A	N/A	N/A	N/A	N/A
Hong Jingwen (Chinese: 洪静雯; pinyin: Hóng Jìngwén)	October 14, 1996 (age 29)	Haikou, Hainan	N/A	N/A	N/A	GNZ48 14	29	29
Jiang Yuhang (Chinese: 江雨航; pinyin: Jiāng Yǔháng)	June 6, 2000 (age 26)	Chengdu, Sichuan						N/A
Lu Jing (Chinese: 卢静; pinyin: Lú Jìng)	November 5, 1994 (age 31)	Longyan, Fujian	GNZ48 3	GNZ48 8	51	47	N/A	N/A
Liu Lifei (Chinese: 刘力菲; pinyin: Liú Lìfēi)	October 30, 1995 (age 30)	Dazhou, Sichuan	N/A	23	21	12	24	21
Liu Qianqian (Chinese: 刘倩倩; pinyin: Liú Qiànqiàn)	November 28, 1994 (age 31)	Fuzhou, Fujian	N/A	66	55	GNZ48 16	GNZ48 16	N/A
Wu Yufei (Chinese: 吴羽霏; pinyin: Wú Yǔfēi)	July 28, 2000 (age 26)	Longyan, Fujian			N/A	N/A	N/A	31
Xian Shennan (Chinese: 冼燊楠; pinyin: Xiǎn Shēnnán)	November 9, 2001 (age 24)	Wuzhou, Guangxi	N/A	N/A	N/A	N/A	N/A	N/A
Yang Ruoxi (Chinese: 杨若惜; pinyin: Yáng Ruòxī)	February 4, 2000 (age 26)	Sichuan					N/A	N/A
Zheng Danni (Chinese: 郑丹妮; pinyin: Zhèng Dānnī)	January 26, 2001 (age 25)	Shantou/Shenzhen, Guangdong	GNZ48 4	45	18	19	15	17
Zeng Jia (Chinese: 曾佳; pinyin: Zēng Jiā)	October 24, 1999 (age 26)	Chongqing			CKG48 8			N/A
Zhang Run (Chinese: 张润; pinyin: Zhāng Rùn)	November 15, 2001 (age 24)	Chengdu, Sichuan				N/A	N/A	N/A
Zhang Xin (Chinese: 张昕; pinyin: Zhāng Xīn) (Note: Concurrent member of SNH48 Team HII and GNZ48 Team NIII.)	October 19, 1995 (age 30)	Guangzhou, Guangdong	N/A	N/A	N/A	20	11	11
Zhu Yixin (Chinese: 朱怡欣; pinyin: Zhū Yíxīn) (Note: Demoted to trainee on May 14, 2018, returned to Team G)	April 22, 1998 (age 28)	Jinhua, Zhejiang		N/A	GNZ48 16	45	28	18

=== Team Z ===
- The representative color is Peach.
- The current captain is Long Yirui and the vice captain is Ma Xinyue.

Name	Birth date (age)	Birthplace	Election rank					
Name	Birth date (age)	Birthplace	3	4	5	6	7	8
Chen Guijun (Chinese: 陈桂君; pinyin: Chén Guìjūn)	October 8, 1997 (age 28)	Chengdu, Sichuan		N/A	N/A	GNZ48 13	N/A	N/A
Deng Hui'en (Chinese: 邓惠恩; pinyin: Dèng Huì'ēn)	March 23, 1997 (age 29)	Shenzhen, Guangdong			N/A	N/A	N/A	N/A
Fang Qi (Chinese: 方琪; pinyin: Fāng Qí)	June 2, 1999 (age 27)	Jiangxi				34	25	27
Gao Weiran (Chinese: 高蔚然; pinyin: Gāo Wèirán)	October 8, 1997 (age 28)	Henan			N/A		N/A	N/A
Liang Qiao (Chinese: 梁乔; pinyin: Liáng Qiáo)	November 1, 2003 (age 22)	Chengdu, Sichuan				N/A	N/A	N/A
Liang Wanlin (Chinese: 梁婉琳; pinyin: Liáng Wǎnlín)	October 12, 2000 (age 25)	Guilin, Guangxi			GNZ48 14	N/A	39	N/A
Long Yirui (Chinese: 龙亦瑞; pinyin: Lóng Yìruì)	October 2, 1995 (age 30)	Chengdu, Sichuan		N/A	GNZ48 15	N/A	35	45
Ma Xinyue (Chinese: 马昕玥; pinyin: Mǎ Xīnyuè)	February 19, 2004 (age 22)	Shaanxi					N/A	N/A
Nong Yanping (Chinese: 农燕萍; pinyin: Nóng Yànpíng) (Note: Concurrent member of GNZ48 Team Z and SNH48 Team HII)	July 30, 1994 (age 32)	Nanning, Guangxi		N/A	N/A	N/A	N/A	N/A
Tang Lijia (Chinese: 唐莉佳; pinyin: Táng Lìjiā)	January 18, 1996 (age 30)	Mianyang, Sichuan	GNZ48 2	50	36	11	19	15
Wang Qiannuo (Chinese: 王芊诺; pinyin: Wáng Qiānnuò) (Note: Originally known as Wang Cuifei (王翠菲), concurrent member of GNZ48 Team Z and CKG48)	February 21, 2000 (age 26)	Guangzhou, Guangdong		N/A	N/A	N/A	N/A	N/A
Wang Siyue (Chinese: 王偲越; pinyin: Wáng Sīyuè) (Note: Concurrent member of GNZ48 Team Z and CKG48)	February 19, 2001 (age 25)	Nanjing, Jiangsu		GNZ48 15	N/A	N/A	N/A	N/A
Wang Zi (Chinese: 王梓; pinyin: Wáng Zǐ)	October 3, 2000 (age 25)	Zhuzhou, Hunan					N/A	N/A
Wang Zixin (Chinese: 王秭歆; pinyin: Wáng Zǐxīn)	December 23, 1999 (age 26)	Qingyang, Gansu		N/A		N/A	36	40
Yang Kelu (Chinese: 杨可璐; pinyin: Yáng Kělù)	August 10, 1998 (age 27)	Wuhan, Hubei		N/A	N/A	N/A	N/A	42
Yang Yuanyuan (Chinese: 杨媛媛; pinyin: Yáng Yuányuán)	December 17, 2000 (age 25)	Chengdu, Sichuan		N/A	GNZ48 12	46	N/A	38
Zhou Peixi (Chinese: 周培溪; pinyin: Zhōu Péixī)	August 2, 2001 (age 25)	Guizhou						
Zhang Youning (Chinese: 张幼柠; pinyin: Zhāng Yòuníng)	October 27, 2001 (age 24)	Guang'an, Sichuan					N/A	N/A

=== Trainee ===
Name	Birth date (age)	Birthplace	Election rank					
Name	Birth date (age)	Birthplace	3	4	5	6	7	8
Huang Rutong (Chinese: 黄汝彤; pinyin: Huáng Rǔtóng)	January 26	Macau						
Hui Yuxuan (Chinese: 惠煜轩; pinyin: Huì Yùxuān)	December 8, 2002 (age 23)	Shenzhen, Guangdong						
Lin Entong (Chinese: 林恩同; pinyin: Lín Ēntóng)	June 30, 2006 (age 20)	Shenzhen, Guangdong						
Lu Jingting (Chinese: 陆靖婷; pinyin: Lù Jìngtíng)	July 10, 2002 (age 24)	Guangzhou, Guangdong						
Lei Shuyi (Chinese: 雷淑怡; pinyin: Léi Shūyí)	September 19	Jiangmen, Guangdong						
Zhang Shuyu (Chinese: 张书瑀; pinyin: Zhāng Shūyǔ)	November 23, 1999 (age 26)	Guangdong					N/A	N/A

=== Members on hiatus ===
- Regular members who are unable to continue to participate in the SNH48 group due to academic, physical, contractual or personal reasons will be counted as temporary members. These members also include the ones who claimed as non-members that yet to be removed from the list of members.

Name	Birth date (age)	Birthplace	Team	Election rank						Notes
Name	Birth date (age)	Birthplace	Team	3	4	5	6	7	8	Notes
Chen Junhong (Chinese: 陈俊宏; pinyin: Chén Jùnhóng)	September 28, 2000 (age 25)	Wuhan, Hubei	Team G		N/A	N/A				On hiatus since May 25, 2019; Unofficially resigned on May 18, 2019
Chen Yuqi (Chinese: 陈雨琪; pinyin: Chén Yǔqí)	December 16, 2000 (age 25)	Xiangtan, Hunan	Team G	N/A	GNZ48 14	N/A				On hiatus since January 19, 2019; Unofficially resigned on September 30, 2018
Fang Xiaoyu (Chinese: 方晓瑜; pinyin: Fāng Xiǎoyú)	March 4, 1996 (age 30)	Xi'an, Shaanxi	Team G		N/A	N/A				On hiatus since January 19, 2019; Unofficially resigned on November 7, 2018
Gao Yuanjing (Chinese: 高源婧; pinyin: Gāo Yuánjìng)	July 6, 1998 (age 28)	Weifang, Shandong	Team G	GNZ48 5	N/A	58	N/A			On hiatus since June 13, 2020
Lin Jiapei (Chinese: 林嘉佩; pinyin: Lín Jiāpèi)	August 16, 1998 (age 27)	Zhongshan, Guangdong	Team G	N/A	N/A	N/A	N/A	N/A	N/A	On hiatus since March 1, 2022; Unofficially resigned on August 16, 2021
Li Qinjie (Chinese: 李沁洁; pinyin: Lǐ Qìnjié)	February 12, 1998 (age 28)	Chengdu, Sichuan	Team G	GNZ48 6	N/A	N/A				On hiatus since May 25, 2019
Xu Huiling (Chinese: 徐慧玲; pinyin: Xú Huìlíng)	October 21, 1997 (age 28)	Chongqing	Team G			N/A	N/A	N/A	N/A	On hiatus since April 6, 2021; Unofficially resigned on November 21, 2020, held her last event on November 24
Chen Huijing (Chinese: 陈慧婧; pinyin: Chén Huìjìng)	January 13, 1997 (age 29)	Wenzhou, Zhejiang	Team NIII	N/A	N/A	N/A				On hiatus since January 19, 2019; Unofficially resigned on November 24, 2018; held her last event on November 25
Deng Manhui (Chinese: 邓熳慧; pinyin: Dèng Mànhuì)	September 22, 2000 (age 25)	Zhangjiajie, Hunan	Team NIII				N/A			On hiatus since June 13, 2020; Unofficially resigned on March 14, 2020
Liu Guo (Chinese: 刘果; pinyin: Liú Guǒ)	December 15, 2003 (age 22)	Chengdu, Sichuan	Team NIII					N/A	N/A	On hiatus since March 1, 2022
Lyu Manfei (Chinese: 吕曼菲; pinyin: Lǚ Mànfēi)	March 25, 2007 (age 19)	Shenzhen, Guangdong	Team NIII						N/A	On hiatus since January 24, 2022; Unofficially resigned on January 21, 2022
Mo Xin (Chinese: 莫昕; pinyin: Mò Xīn)	October 7, 1998 (age 27)	Liuzhou, Guangxi	Team NIII					N/A	N/A	On hiatus since April 6, 2021; Unofficially resigned on December 11, 2020, held her last event on December 12
Sun Xin (Chinese: 孙馨; pinyin: Sūn Xīn)	February 27, 2000 (age 26)	Nanjing, Jiangsu	Team NIII	N/A	N/A	N/A	N/A			On hiatus since December 6, 2019; Unofficially resigned on October 16, 2019; was told to suspend all activities on the same day.
Shi Zhujun (Chinese: 石竹君; pinyin: Shí Zhújūn)	December 25, 1999 (age 26)	Hunan	Team NIII					N/A	N/A	On hiatus since March 1, 2022; Unofficially resigned on February 27, 2022, held her last event on the same day
Tang Shiyi (Chinese: 唐诗怡; pinyin: Táng Shīyí)	July 16, 1997 (age 29)	Yanbian, Jilin	Team NIII		N/A					On hiatus since January 19, 2019; Unofficially resigned in May 2018
Xie Ailin (Chinese: 谢艾琳; pinyin: Xiè Àilín)	December 28, 1996 (age 29)	Chaozhou, Guangdong	Team NIII		N/A	N/A	N/A	N/A	N/A	On hiatus since March 1, 2022
Xu Jiayin (Chinese: 徐佳音; pinyin: Xú Jiāyīn)	August 18, 2000 (age 25)	Xiamen, Fujian	Team NIII			N/A		N/A	N/A	On hiatus since November 17, 2020; Unofficially resigned on July 10, 2020
Xiao Wenling (Chinese: 肖文铃; pinyin: Xiāo Wénlíng)	January 24, 2001 (age 25)	Leshan, Sichuan	Team NIII	N/A	GNZ48 13	50	N/A			On hiatus since September 15, 2019; Unofficially resigned on June 12, 2019
Zuo Jiaxin (Chinese: 左嘉欣; pinyin: Zuǒ Jiāxīn)	September 1, 1996 (age 29)	Shanghai	Team NIII	N/A	N/A	N/A	N/A			On hiatus since September 15, 2019; Unofficially resigned on June 14, 2019
Zheng Yue (Chinese: 郑悦; pinyin: Zhèng Yuè)	August 11, 1997 (age 28)	Anhui	Team NIII		N/A	N/A				On hiatus since January 19, 2019; Unofficially resigned on July 30, 2018
Bi Ruishan (Chinese: 毕瑞珊; pinyin: Bì Ruìshān)	January 13, 2003 (age 23)	Dalian, Liaoning	Team Z			N/A				On hiatus since May 25, 2019; Unofficially resigned on May 26, 2019
Du Qiulin (Chinese: 杜秋霖; pinyin: Dù Qiūlín)	August 24, 1998 (age 27)	Bazhong, Sichuan	Team Z		N/A	GNZ48 13				On hiatus since March 29, 2019; Unofficially resigned on February 24, 2019
Guo Yining (Chinese: 郭铱宁; pinyin: Guō Yīníng)	September 8, 1998 (age 27)	Baoji, Shaanxi	Team Z			N/A	N/A			On hiatus since June 13, 2020; Unofficially resigned in September 2019
He Mengyao (Chinese: 何梦瑶; pinyin: Hé Mèngyáo)	May 12, 2002 (age 24)	Yichang, Hubei	Team Z			N/A				On hiatus since May 25, 2019; Unofficially resigned on February 26, 2019; held her last event on March 3.
Liu Jiayi (Chinese: 刘嘉怡; pinyin: Liú Jiāyí)	July 19, 2002 (age 24)	Changsha, Hunan	Team Z		N/A					On hiatus from October 11 to 12, 2017 and since August 10, 2018
Lai Zixi (Chinese: 赖梓惜; pinyin: Lài Zǐxī)	September 6, 2002 (age 23)	Ganzhou, Jiangxi	Team Z		SHY48 4	SHY48 9	N/A			On hiatus since December 6, 2019; Unofficially resigned on October 3, 2019
Si Polin (Chinese: 司珀琳; pinyin: Sī Pòlín)	October 18, 1996 (age 29)	Yantai, Hebei	Team Z			N/A				On hiatus since June 13, 2020; Unofficially resigned on June 10, 2020
Wang Jiongyi (Chinese: 王炯义; pinyin: Wáng Jiǒngyì)	June 5, 2000 (age 26)	Xinjiang	Team Z		GNZ48 16		N/A	N/A	N/A	On hiatus since January 11, 2022; Unofficially resigned on January 2, 2022
Wang Ying (Chinese: 王盈; pinyin: Wáng Yíng)	June 15, 1997 (age 29)	Weinan, Shaanxi	Team Z		N/A					On hiatus from October 11 to 12, 2017 and since August 10, 2018; Unofficially resigned on September 1, 2017; held her last event on October 5
Xie Feifei (Chinese: 谢菲菲; pinyin: Xiè Fēifēi)	January 18, 2000 (age 26)	Shanwei, Guangdong	Team Z			N/A	N/A	N/A	N/A	On hiatus since October 20, 2021; Unofficially resigned on August 31, 2021
Ye Xiaomeng (Chinese: 叶晓梦; pinyin: Yè Xiǎomèng)	November 29, 2002 (age 23)	Shaoguan, Guangdong	Team Z			N/A				On hiatus since January 19, 2019; Unofficially resigned on December 16, 2018
Yu Zhiyuan (Chinese: 余芷媛; pinyin: Yú Zhǐyuán)	December 8, 2002 (age 23)	Hunan	Team Z			N/A				On hiatus since May 25, 2019; Unofficially resigned on May 19, 2019
Zhang Qiuyi (Chinese: 张秋怡; pinyin: Zhāng Qiūyí)	October 12, 1998 (age 27)	Shenzhen, Guangdong	Team Z		N/A	N/A	N/A			On hiatus since June 13, 2020; Unofficially resigned on March 9, 2020
Zhang Xinyu (Chinese: 张心雨; pinyin: Zhāng Xīnyǔ)	March 24, 1996 (age 30)	Xi'an, Shaanxi	Team Z		N/A					On hiatus since October 11, 2017; Unofficially resigned on September 9, 2017
Li Chenxi (Chinese: 李晨曦; pinyin: Lǐ Chénxī)	September 1, 2000 (age 25)	Xiamen, Fujian	Trainee			N/A				On hiatus since January 19, 2019; Unofficially resigned on December 16, 2018
Wang Muyuan (Chinese: 汪慕远; pinyin: Wāng Mùyuǎn)	December 26, 1997 (age 28)	Quzhou, Zhejiang	Trainee			N/A				On hiatus since January 19, 2019
Wang Mengyuan (Chinese: 王梦媛; pinyin: Wáng Mèngyuán)	August 27, 2004 (age 21)	Shenzhen, Guangdong	Trainee			N/A				On hiatus since January 19, 2019; Unofficially resigned on December 3, 2018
Xiao Wenjing (Chinese: 肖文静; pinyin: Xiāo Wénjìng)	October 21, 2002 (age 23)	Chengdu, Sichuan	Trainee			N/A				On hiatus since January 19, 2019; Unofficially resigned on December 17, 2018
Lyu Siqi (Chinese: 吕思琪; pinyin: Lǚ Sīqí)	November 28, 1999 (age 26)	Heilongjiang	Trainee							On hiatus since May 18, 2021; Unofficially resigned on May 18, 2021
Wang Yan (Chinese: 王琰; pinyin: Wáng Yǎn)	August 1, 1999 (age 27)	Henan	Trainee							On hiatus since November 8, 2021; Unofficially resigned on November 8, 2021
Xie Leilei (Chinese: 谢蕾蕾; pinyin: Xiè Lěilěi)	December 1, 1998 (age 27)	Huizhou, Guangdong	Trainee	40	32	11	23	16	N/A	On hiatus since January 24, 2022; Unofficially resigned on August 14, 2021
Xiang Yujing (Chinese: 项宇婧; pinyin: Xiàng Yǔjìng)	July 9, 2002 (age 24)	Shangrao, Jiangxi	Trainee							On hiatus since January 24, 2022; Unofficially resigned on November 9, 2021

=== Former members ===
==== Graduated members ====
Name _{(Birth/death date, birthplace)}	Team	Election rank						Notes
Name _{(Birth/death date, birthplace)}	Team	3	4	5	6	7	8	Notes
Wang Xinyue (Chinese: 王馨悦; pinyin: Wáng Xīnyùe) (July 19, 1994 in Yunnan)	Team G	N/A						Graduated on October 1, 2016; Listed as hiatus from May 19, 2017, to June 1, 2017
Dai Xinyi (Chinese: 戴欣佚; pinyin: Dài Xīnyì) (December 17, 2001 in Chongqing)	Team NIII							Graduated on February 15, 2017; Listed as hiatus from May 19, 2017, to June 1, 2017
Du Yuwei (Chinese: 杜雨微; pinyin: Dù Yǔwēi) (March 17, 1999 in Shandong - October 16, 2018)	Team G	N/A	N/A					Graduated on May 26, 2018; Unofficially resigned on October 30, 2017; Committed suicide on 16 October 2018
Cheng Yixin (Chinese: 程一心; pinyin: Chéng Yīxīn) (January 24, 1998 in Jiujiang, Jiangxi)	Team G		N/A					Graduated on January 19, 2019; On hiatus from August 10, 2018, to January 19, 2019; Unofficially resigned on March 20, 2018
Hu Yiying (Chinese: 胡怡莹; pinyin: Hú Yíyíng) (March 19, 1997 in Inner Mongolia)	Team G	N/A						Graduated on January 19, 2019; On hiatus from May 19, 2017, to January 19, 2019; Unofficially resigned in April 2017
Liu Mengya (Chinese: 刘梦雅; pinyin: Liú Mèngyǎ) (March 24, 1997 in Fuyang, Anhui)	Team G	N/A	N/A					Graduated on January 19, 2019; On hiatus from August 10, 2018, to January 19, 2019; Unofficially resigned on January 15, 2018
Liu Xiaomo (Chinese: 刘小末; pinyin: Liú Xiǎomò) (November 26 in Guizhou)	Team G		N/A					Graduated on January 19, 2019; On hiatus from October 11 to 12, 2017 and from August 10, 2018, to January 19, 2019; Unofficially resigned on July 30, 2017
Liu Xiaoxiao (Chinese: 刘筱筱; pinyin: Liú Xiǎoxiǎo) (November 1, 2000 in Kunming, Yunnan)	Team G	N/A	N/A					Graduated on January 19, 2019; On hiatus from October 11 to 12, 2017 and from August 10, 2018, to January 19, 2019; Unofficially resigned on August 11, 2017
Xiang Yun (Chinese: 向芸; pinyin: Xiàng Yún) (June 10, 1999 in Changsha, Hunan)	Team G							Graduated on January 19, 2019; On hiatus from May 19, 2017, to January 19, 2019; Unofficially resigned in July 2017
Zhou Qianyu (Chinese: 周倩玉; pinyin: Zhōu Qiànyù) (April 18, 2000 (age 26) in Neijiang, Sichuan)	Team G	N/A						Graduated on January 19, 2019, and joined IDOLS Ft on September 7, 2019; On hiatus from February 19, 2017, to January 19, 2019; Unofficially resigned on February 19, 2017
Li Yihong (Chinese: 李伊虹; pinyin: Lǐ Yīhóng) (October 13, 2000 in Nanchong, Sichuan)	Team NIII		N/A					Graduated on January 19, 2019; On hiatus from August 10, 2018, to January 19, 2019; Unofficially resigned on February 26, 2018; held her last event on March 18
Chen Ziying (Chinese: 陈梓荧; pinyin: Chén Zǐyíng) (January 7, 1999 in Foshan, Guangdong)	Team Z		N/A	N/A				Graduated on January 19, 2019; Unofficially resigned on July 28, 2018; held her last event on August 5
Yu Shanshan (Chinese: 于珊珊; pinyin: Yú Shānshān) (December 17, 2000 in Tangshan, Hebei)	Team Z		N/A					Graduated on January 19, 2019; On hiatus from August 10, 2018, to January 19, 2019; Unofficially resigned in March 2018
Zhao Yimin (Chinese: 赵翊民; pinyin: Zhào Yìmín) (August 18, 1997 in Zhejiang)	Team Z		N/A					Graduated on January 19, 2019; On hiatus from October 11 to 12, 2017 and from August 10, 2018, to January 19, 2019; Unofficially resigned on August 9, 2017
Chen Letian (Chinese: 陈乐添; pinyin: Chén Lètiān) (June 19, 1996 in Guangdong)	Team G		N/A					Graduated before April 2020; On hiatus from October 11 to 12, 2017 and from August 10, 2018, to before April 2020; Unofficially resigned on August 26, 2017; held her last event on August 27
Chen Xinyu (Chinese: 陈欣妤; pinyin: Chén Xīnyú) (June 5, 1998 in Taipei, Taiwan)	Team NIII	N/A	GNZ48 9	N/A	N/A			Dismissed on April 25, 2020
Xie Huixian (Chinese: 谢慧先; pinyin: Xiè Huìxiān) (May 11, 2002 in Sichuan)	Trainee							Resigned on December 11, 2020
Zheng Yiwen (Chinese: 郑奕雯; pinyin: Zhèng Yìwén) (January 11, 2001 in Fujian)	Trainee							Dismissed on September 26, 2021
Zuo Jingyuan (Chinese: 左婧媛; pinyin: Zuǒ Jìngyuán) (August 19, 1998 in Luzhou, Sichuan)	Team NIII	N/A	GNZ48 12	42	18	8	10	Dismissed on February 22, 2022
Chen Jiaying (Chinese: 陈佳莹; pinyin: Chén Jiāyíng) (August 16, 2002 in Guangdong)	Trainee		N/A	N/A	N/A	N/A	N/A	Resigned on March 9, 2022

==== Transferred members ====
Name	Birth date (age)	Transfer...		Election rank					
Name	Birth date (age)	From	To	3	4	5	6	7	8
Huang Lirong (Chinese: 黄黎蓉; pinyin: Huáng Líróng)	January 23, 1999 (age 27)	Team G	IDOLS Ft		N/A	N/A			
Liang Ke (Chinese: 梁可; pinyin: Liáng Kě)	March 23, 1999 (age 27)	Team G	IDOLS Ft		N/A	N/A			
Feng Jiaxi (Chinese: 冯嘉希; pinyin: Féng Jiāxī)	June 4, 1996 (age 30)	Team NIII	IDOLS Ft	N/A	GNZ48 11	N/A			
Dai Ling (Chinese: 代玲; pinyin: Dài Líng)	September 17, 1998 (age 27)	Team Z	IDOLS Ft		N/A	N/A			
Lai Junyi (Chinese: 赖俊亦; pinyin: Lài Jùnyì)	July 28, 2002 (age 24)	Team Z	IDOLS Ft/ CKG48		N/A	N/A		N/A	N/A
Zhao Xinyu (Chinese: 赵欣雨; pinyin: Zhào Xīnyǔ)	July 10, 2001 (age 25)	Team Z	IDOLS Ft		N/A	N/A			
Gao Xueyi (Chinese: 高雪逸; pinyin: Gāo Xuěyì)	October 27, 2000 (age 25)	Team NIII	IDOLS Ft		N/A	N/A		N/A	N/A
Xiong Xinyao (Chinese: 熊心瑶; pinyin: Xióng Xīnyáo)	January 19, 1996 (age 30)	Team NIII	IDOLS Ft	N/A	GNZ48 10	N/A	N/A		
Zhang Kaiqi (Chinese: 张凯祺; pinyin: Zhāng Kǎiqí)	November 2, 1998 (age 27)	Team G	IDOLS Ft	N/A	N/A				
Wu Siqi (Chinese: 吴思琪; pinyin: Wú Sīqí)	October 30, 2000 (age 25)	Team NIII	IDOLS Ft					N/A	
Jiang Xinyao (Chinese: 姜欣瑶; pinyin: Jiāng Xīnyáo)	December 27	Trainee	IDOLS Ft						
Yang Qingying (Chinese: 阳青颖; pinyin: Yáng Qīngyǐng)	August 27, 2001 (age 24)	Team G	IDOLS Ft	N/A	N/A	N/A	N/A	N/A	N/A

==== Former trainees ====
- Cheng Ziyu (Chinese: 程子钰; pinyin: Chéng Zǐyù) (April 29, 1998 (age 28) in Changsha, Hunan) transferred to IDOLS Ft on January 19, 2019
- Men Xiutian (Chinese: 门秀天; pinyin: Mén Xiùtiān) (January 6, 2004 (age 22) in Qingdao, Shandong) transferred to IDOLS Ft on January 19, 2019
- Shu Xiang (Chinese: 舒湘; pinyin: Shū Xiāng) (July 23, 2002 (age 24) in Chengdu, Sichuan) transferred to IDOLS Ft on January 19, 2019
- Yan Yudie (Chinese: 鄢羽蝶; pinyin: Yān Yǔdié) (May 10, 2000 (age 26) in Chongqing) graduated on January 19, 2019, and joined IDOLS Ft on March 11, 2019
- Zhang Zeting (Chinese: 章泽婷; pinyin: Zhāng Zétíng) (October 29, 2002 (age 23) in Shenzhen, Guangdong) transferred to IDOLS Ft on January 19, 2019
- Zhang Ziying (Chinese: 张紫颖; pinyin: Zhāng Zǐyǐng) (March 16, 2003 (age 23) in Yangjiang, Guangdong) transferred to IDOLS Ft on January 19, 2019

== Discography ==
=== EP ===
No.	Release date	Title	Release form	Product number	Remarks
Star48 Culture Media
1	September 19, 2016	"You don't know me" (Chinese: 你所不知道的我)	CD	GNZ55100105	Standard Edition
2	January 16, 2017	"BOOM! BOOM! BOOM!"	CD	GNZ55100199	Standard Edition
3	April 13, 2017	"I.F"	CD	GNZ55100284	Standard Edition
4	September 11, 2017; September 23, 2017	"SAY NO"	CD; CD	GNZ55100473; GNZ55100474	Special Edition; Standard Edition
5	December 24, 2017	"See Me Here" (Chinese: 不见不散)	CD; None	SNH11101110; SNH11101110	Standard Edition; Donation Edition
6	March 28, 2018	"Tight handling" (Chinese: 抱紧处理)	CD; None	GNZ55100700; GNZ55100700	Standard Edition; Donation Edition
7	December 20, 2018	"NOW AND FOREVER" (Chinese: 此刻到永远)	CD; None	GNZ55101177; GNZ55101177	Standard Edition; Donation Edition
8	March 29, 2019	"HERO"	CD; None	GNZ55101266; GNZ55101266	Standard Edition; Donation Edition

=== Published album ===
No.	Release date	Title	Release form	Product number	Remarks
Star48 Culture Media
1	August 11, 2017	Double-sided Idol (Chinese: 双面偶像)	N/A	N/A	Digital album
2	January 12, 2018	Trigonometric Function (Chinese: 三角函数)	N/A	N/A	Digital album
3	July 12, 2018	Fiona.N	N/A	N/A	Digital album
4	July 10, 2019	Victoria.G	N/A	N/A	Digital album
5	July 9, 2021	Fiona.N RESTART	N/A	N/A	Digital album

=== Other songs ===
Issue day	Title	Singing members	Writing	Composing	Arranging	Remarks
October 12, 2016	"'Flashing Dream"	Chen Chen, Chen Yuqi, Gao Yuanzhen, Li Yujie, Lin Jiapei, Xie Leilei, Zhang Kaiyu, Zhang Qiongyu, Zhou Qianyu, Chen Nanyu, Chen Xinyu, Liu Lifei, Lu Jing, Tang Lijia, Zheng Danni, Zuo Jiaxin	Zhao Jinying	Zhao Jinying	Peace	Included in SNH48 EP "Princess Cloak"
April 29, 2017	"Youth Horn (Cantonese version)	Team Gnz		姜帆	谢维	
April 29, 2017	"N3ver Give Up (Cantonese version)	Team NIII		Masaya	Masaya	
April 29, 2017	"The Next Dawn (Cantonese Version)	Team Z		Duck Hair	Guo Weicong	
May 19, 2017	"Flash'	Team Gnz	Mayu Huang Huang Fengyi	金源奕,朴志娟	Steve Wu	Included in SNH48 EP "Summer Lemon ferry"
May 19, 2017	"Summer Concerto"	Team NIII	Andy C	Aaron H, Tang Shaoxuan	Aaron H	Included in SNH48 EP "Summer Lemon Boat"
May 19, 2017	"Say you Love Me"	Team Z	廖芸珮	Steve Wu,金源奕	Steve Wu	Included in SNH48 EP "Summer Lemon ferry"
November 23, 2017	"We are all the same"	Huang Lirong, Luo Hanyue, Yang Qingying, Chen Xinyi, Feng Jiaxi, Liu Lifei, Tang Lijia, Chen Guijun, Chen Yuying	三本目	燣Ee Kyu Won	燣ee Kyu Won	
May 17, 2018	"Never give up"	Chen Ke, Chen Yuqi, Gao Yuanjing, Luo Hanyue, Zen Aijia, Zhang Qiongyu, Chen Nanxi, Hong Jingwen, Liu Qianqian, Tang Lijia, Zheng Danni, Zuo jiaxin, Bi Ruishan, Chen Guijun, Luo Yirui, Wang Siyue	吕孝廷	吕孝廷	唐绍崴	Included in SNH48 EP "Forest Law"

== Concerts ==
Title	Date	Place	Remarks
“爱音乐 翼起来”GNZ48梦想起航 Show Case演唱会 "Love Music Wing Up" GNZ48 Dream Departure Show Case Concert	August 26, 2016	Sun Yat-sen Memorial Hall	
GNZ48 TOP16 PVC 姐妹情深 深圳巡演; GNZ48 TOP16 PVC sisters Shenzhen tour	October 6, 2018	Shenzhen China Resources City Vientiane Theatre	
让您渝粤; Rang Nin Yu Yue	January 23, 2021	-	
你是我的星光; GNZ48 Thanksgiving Concert "You are my starlight"	May 21, 2022	Sun Yat-sen Memorial Hall	2:00 p.m.
他们所不知道的我们; GNZ48 6th Anniversary Concert "ALL ABOUT US"	May 21, 2022	Sun Yat-sen Memorial Hall	7:00 p.m.
GNZ48 x CKG48 成都巡演; GNZ48 x CKG48 Chengdu Tour	July 2 and 3, 2022	Chuanxiu Theater	

== Show ==
=== Notework Program ===
China

Broadcast time	name	Website	Remarks
July 11, 2016 - October 24, 2016	GNZone	Tencent Video, bilibili	finished
February 10, 2017 - May 14, 2017; December 7, 2017 - February 16, 2018	GNZero-〇蛋厨房	Tencent Video, bilibili	The first season is over The second season is over
May 16, 2017 - November 17, 2017	GNewZ	bilibili	finished
May 17, 2017 - July 12, 2017	GantoNeZe	Tencent Video, bilibili	finished
December 5, 2017 -	GNZchool	Tencent Video, bilibili	
January 12, 2018 -	GNZ48 Food Map	Netease Mint Live	
April 1, 2018 -	蠱靈精怪GNZ	bilibili	
June 13, 2018 - December 23, 2018	Dance Reality Show (舞力 Real Show)	Netease Mint	Episodes 7 and 9 are in formats of special performances

=== Variety shows ===
South Korea

Broadcast time	name	Channel	Member(s)	Remarks
August 6, 2021 - October 22, 2021	Girls Planet 999 (少女星球999)	Mnet	Liang Jiao, Liang Qiao	Reality competition show

=== Radio program ===
China

Broadcast time	Chinese name	Radio	Remarks
May 5 - July 22, 2017; December 25th, 2017-	GNzzZ	WeChat Public Platform	The first season is over The second season

== Collective endorsements and promotional products ==
China

Endorsement / Promotion Year	Product	Endorsement / Promotional Members	Remarks
2016	Tianyi Daily Rent Card	Chen Xinyi, Liu Lifei, Lu Jing, Tang Lijia, Zheng Danni, Zuo Jiaxin	
2016	Crossing the line of fire	Team Gnz	
2017	OFO Little Yellow Car	Liu Lifei, Lu Jing, Tang Lijia, Zheng Danni	With SNH48 Gong Shiqi, Fei Yuyuan
2017	滋源	Gao Yuanjing, Tang Lijia	
2017	Toshiba	GNZ48	
2018	China International E-sports Festival	Du Qiuling, Liang Wanling, Long Yirui, Yu Zhiyuan	

== Performance ==
Team G

No.	Performance Name	Date	Number of shows/Status
1	Goddess of the theater	April 29 - October 6, 2016	45 shows
2	Heart of the Heart	October 14, 2016 - July 22, 2017	54 shows
3	Two-Faced Idol	August 11, 2017 - June 29, 2019	114 shows
4	Victoria.G	July 5, 2019 - TBD	Current performance

Team NIII

No.	Performance Name	Date	Number of shows/Status
1	My Sun	April 30, 2016 - March 18, 2017	76 shows
2	First person	March 24, 2017 - July 1, 2018	90 shows
3	Fiona.N	July 6, 2018 - TBD	Current performance

Team Z

No.	Performance Name	Date	Number of shows/Status
1	Exclusive Party	November 18, 2016 - September 10, 2017	60 shows
2	Code, The west of LinHe	September 15, 2017 - December 31, 2017	17 shows
3	Trigonometric function	January 12, 2018 - TBD	Current performance
4	Mia.Z	Cancelled	Cancelled

Trainee

No.	Performance Name	Date	Number of shows/Status
1	Idol Research Program	October 1, 2017 - December 30, 2018	64 shows

=== Performance of other locations ===
Team G

No.	Performance Name	Date	Location	Number of shows
1	Two-Faced Idol	April 21–22, 2018	CKG48 Theatre	2 shows

Team NIII

No.	Performance name	Date	Location	Number of shows
1	First person	May 19, 20, 2017	SNH48 Theatre	2 shows
2	First person	May 27, 28, 2017	BEJ48 Theatre	2 shows
3	First person	June 2, 2017	Shenzhen A8 Live	One-off

Team Z

No.	Performance name	Date	Location	Number of shows
1	Trigonometric function	July 15, 2018	Shenzhen A8 Live	One-off

== Awards and nominations ==
Year	Ceremony	Award	Result
2016	VIP Music Awards (Chinese:VIP音乐榜)	VIP Group Award	Won
2016	2016 Music Pioneer Awards (Chinese:音乐先锋榜2016年度颁奖典礼)	Pioneer New Artist Award	Won
2016	2016 Music Pioneer Awards (Chinese:音乐先锋榜2016年度颁奖典礼)	Most Popular Group Online	Won
2017	iFensi Awards 2016 (Chinese:2016最具粉丝影响力颁奖盛典)	Most Potential Girl Group	Won
2018	VIP Music Awards (Chinese:VIP音乐榜)	VIP Group Award	Won

== Notable and controversial incidents ==
During the October 1 National Day show in 2016 in Guangzhou, GNZ48 members performed "Me and My Motherland" (我和我的祖国), and were criticized for singing out of tune, out of sync and even forgetting the lyrics. This could be possibly attributed to lack of preparation or lack of sleep. Since then, it was featured in all the subsequent National Day stage shows.
