= BEJ48 =

Chinese girl group

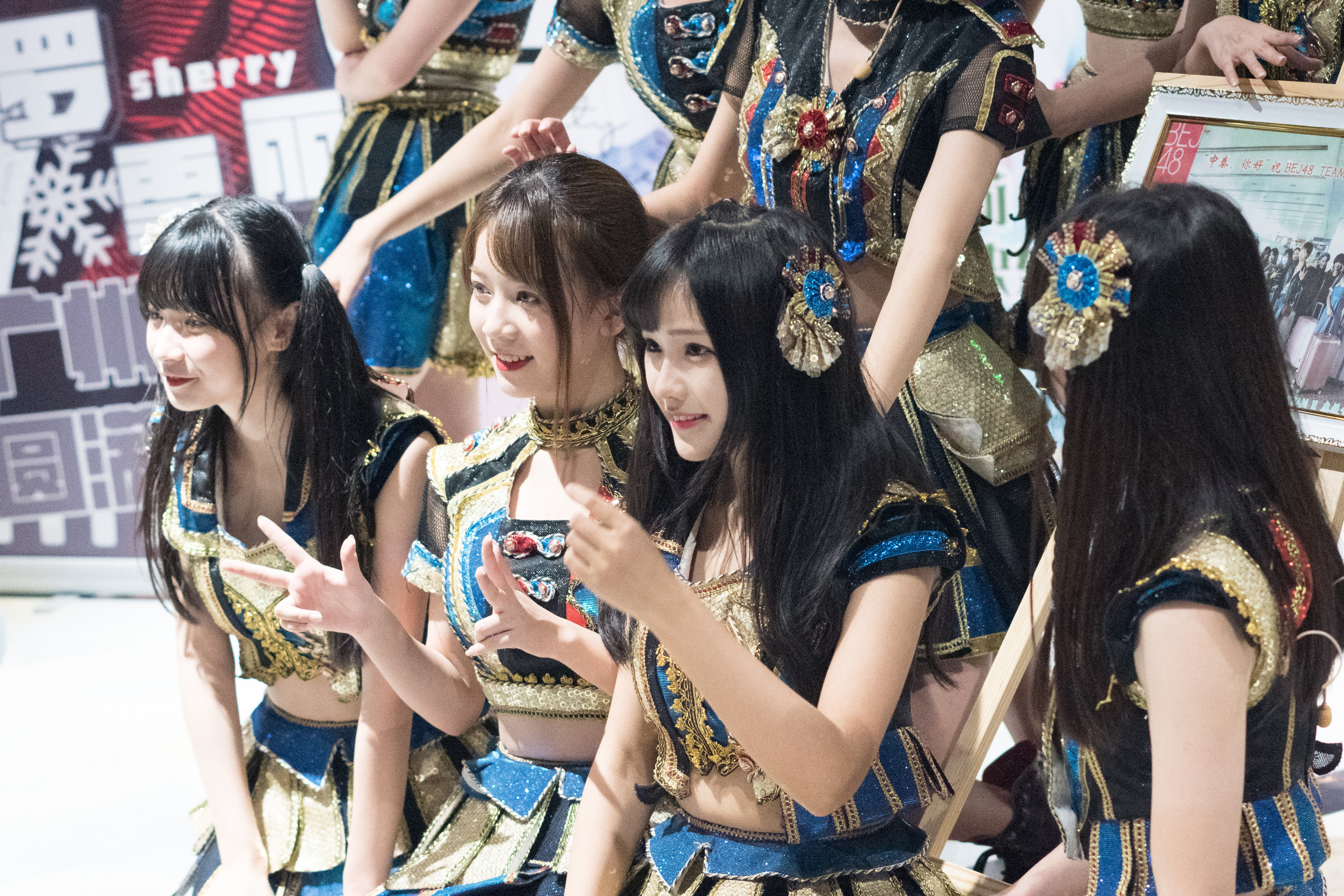
- BEJ48 in 2017

Background information
- Origin: Beijing, China
- Genre: Pop
- Years active: 2016–present
- Labels: Beijing Star48 Culture & Media Co. Ltd.
- Members: BEJ48 Members
- Website: bej48.com

BEJ48 (pronounced "B. E. J. Sìshíbā", or more often "B. E. J. forty-eight") is a Chinese idol girl group based in Beijing. It is one of SNH48's sister groups formed in 2016, together with GNZ48.

== Overview ==
BEJ48 is one of the first two sister groups of SNH48 formed. It has its theatre at the Youtang Life Square at the Chaoyang District in Beijing. Its name is an abbreviation of the pinyin name of "Beijing" (BEi Jing), "BEJ". Its first batch of members consist of some SNH48 fifth and sixth-generation members that are transferred.

As BEJ48 is formed under SNH48's management and not AKB48's managing company, AKS (SNH48 would later part ways with AKB48), the naming of its teams do not follow AKB48's conventions, and its initial two teams are named Team B and Team E.

== History ==
=== 2016 ===
On April 20, 2016, Star48 announced the establishment of SNH48's two sister groups, BEJ48 and GNZ48. At the same time, it started holding auditions for first-generation members.

On April 29, the BEJ48 Theatre opened to public, with Team B holding the first performance of its 1st Stage, "Theater no Megami". On April 30, Team E help the first performance of its 1st Stage, "Pajama Drive".

On June 15, BEJ48 released their first fashion photobook, "Summer's Girl Garden" (初夏的少女花园). On July 19, they released their second fashion photobook, "Hot Party" (高温派对).

On September 5, they released their debut EP, The Awaking (元气觉醒).

On September 15, during Mid-Autumn Special Stage, it was announced that Duan Yixuan and Liu Shuxian were appointed Team B's captain and vice-captain respectively; Li Xiang and Liu Shengnan were appointed Team E's captain and vice-captain; SNH48 Team X's Yan Mingjun was transferred to Team B due to academic reasons.

On October 1, 20 first-generation members were announced, 16 of them whom were assigned to Team J.

On October 2, Team B began its 2nd Stage, "Heart Journey". On October 29, Team J began its 1st Stage, "Exclusive Party".

On November 1, auditions were held for SNH48 eighth-generation members, BEJ48 second-generation members, GNZ48 second-generation members and SHY48 second-generation members.

On December 24, Team E began its 2nd Stage, "Fantasy Coronation".

=== 2017 ===
On January 6, 2017, BEJ48 released their second EP, Smiling Sunflower (微笑的向日葵).

On March 4, Team B's Duan Yixuan and Team E's Li Zi were announced as the Annual Theater MVPs for the year 2016 respectively, as they were the members who received the highest number of votes within each team.

On April 1, they released their third EP, Manifesto (宣言).

On April 8, they held the "48 Idol Festival" special stage.

On April 14, Team B held the first performance of their Waiting Stage, "18 Shining Moments".

On April 20, BEJ48 announced 15 second-generation members during their first anniversary, meanwhile auditions were held for BEJ48, GNZ48 and SHY48 third-generation members.

On April 29, they released their first documentary, "The Best of Us" (BEJ48 最好的我们).

On July 29, BEJ48, along with SNH48, GNZ48, SHY48 and CKG48, held auditions for SNH48 ninth-generation, BEJ48, GNZ48 and SHY48 fourth-generation and CKG48 second-generation members.

On September 23, Team J held their waiting stage, "Because I Like You".

On September 30, BEJ48 released their fourth EP, Variety Exclamation Mark (百变惊叹号).

On October 6, Beijing STUDIO48-produced film Fairy Tale of Love (有言在仙), starring four BEJ48 members, Li Zi, Chen Qiannan, Li Xiang and Huang Enru, was released. The film is based on a book by Tu Jiezi.

On December 3, auditions were held for SNH48 tenth-generation members, BEJ48, GNZ48 and SHY48 fifth-generation members and CKG48 third-generation members.

On December 23, Zhang Huaijin was announced as Team J's captain, while Yang Ye was announced as its co-captain.

On December 24, SNH48 Group released their 18th EP, "Sweet Festival".

=== 2018 ===
On January 19, 2018, Team B debuted its stage, "B A Fighter".

On March 26, together with SNH48 Group, they released their sixth EP, Eyes On Me.

On April 20, BEJ48 held its first "Red vs White" Concert at the BEJ48 Theater, with Team Red emerging victorious. Meanwhile, auditions for sixth-generation members were held.

From April 27–30, BEJ48 held a streaming marathon challenge on Pocket 48 with GNZ48 where members for both groups take turns to record 48 livestream videos within 4 days.

On April 28, BEJ48's trainees debuted their stage, "Next Idol Project".

On April 30, Team E debuted its stage, "Universe".

On June 29, SNH48 Group's management, Star48, opened a global audition to recruit youths to be trained to become artists. This recruitment is for SNH48 Group members, Korean-style idol trainees and Fashion Mina China actors.

On July 14, Team J debuted its stage, "Hakuna Matata".

On September 7, members of BEJ48 and SHY48 attended the China (Beijing) Performing Arts Expo.

On November 8, two sixth-generation members were announced during the trainees' "Next Idol Project" stage.

=== 2019 ===
On January 3, 2019, sixth-generation member Xiong Yiyi was announced during the trainees' "Next Idol Project" stage, however netizens had pointed out that she had previously shot an indecent photo. The next day, officials issued a statement on the incident, denying that she had taken the relevant photos, and would take measures to safeguard the legal rights of the officials and members.

=== 2020 ===
On September 4, 2020, SNH48 announced that due to the impacts of the COVID-19 pandemic and the months long closure of their Beijing theatre that teams B, E and J would all be disbanded. Most members from these teams were transferred to SNH48, and the ones who were left would no longer be split into teams, simply belonging to BEJ48.

As of now, BEJ48 came back and is currently active sister group of SNH48 again.

== Members ==
As of September 14, 2022, according to the official website.

=== BEJ48 ===
Name	Birth date (age)	Birthplace	Election rank						
Name	Birth date (age)	Birthplace	3	4	5	6	7	8	9
Chen Zhenzhen (Chinese: 陈蓁蓁; pinyin: Chén Zhēnzhēn)	May 20, 2000 (age 26)	Shandong						N/A	BEJ 6
Huang Xuanqi (Chinese: 黄宣绮; pinyin: Huáng Xuānqǐ)	September 10, 2004 (age 22)	Sichuan						36	23
Huang Yici (Chinese: 黄怡慈; pinyin: Huáng Yící)	September 10, 2004 (age 22)	Sichuan						N/A	14
Sun Xiaoyan (Chinese: 孙晓艳; pinyin: Sūn Xiǎoyàn)	November 29, 1998 (age 27)	Heilongjiang		N/A	N/A	N/A	N/A	BEJ 2	48
Tang Chenwei (Chinese: 唐晨葳; pinyin: Táng Chénwēi)	June 13, 1998 (age 28)	Shanxi						N/A	N/A
Wang Danni (Chinese: 王丹妮; pinyin: Wáng Dānnī)	March 17, 1998 (age 28)	Shaanxi					N/A	BEJ 6	N/A
Zhang Chenyi (Chinese: 张宸祎; pinyin: Zhāng Chényī)	January 5, 1999 (age 27)	Hebei						N/A	N/A
Zhang Menghui (Chinese: 张梦慧; pinyin: Zhāng Mènghuì)	December 3, 1998 (age 27)	Jiangsu	N/A	BEJ48 14	N/A	N/A	N/A	BEJ 5	42
Zhou Xiang (Chinese: 周湘; pinyin: Zhōu Xiāng)	March 18, 2001 (age 25)	Jiangxi			N/A	N/A	N/A	BEJ 3	BEJ 7
Zhang Zhijie (Chinese: 张智杰; pinyin: Zhāng Zhìjíe)	June 20, 1998 (age 28)	Tianjin					N/A	N/A	45

=== Members on hiatus ===
Name	Birth date (age)	Birthplace	Team	Election rank						Notes
Name	Birth date (age)	Birthplace	Team	3	4	5	6	7	8	Notes
Zheng Yifan (Chinese: 郑一凡; pinyin: Zhēng Yìfán)	May 9, 2001 (age 21)	Chaoayang, Beijing	N/A	N/A	N/A		N/A	N/A		On hiatus since June 15, 2021
Zhang Ruiyi (Chinese: 张睿怡; pinyin: Zhāng Ruìyí)	October 16, 1995 (age 27)	Shaanxi					N/A	N/A		On hiatus since December 8, 2020
Xu Siyang (Chinese: 顼凘炀; pinyin: Xū Sīyáng)	March 22, 2000 (age 22)	Neimenggu	N/A	BEJ48 11	N/A	N/A	N/A	N/A		On hiatus since June 15, 2021
Xiong Xin (Chinese: 熊鑫; pinyin: Xíong Xīn)	April 12, 1998 (age 24)	Sichuan			N/A	N/A	N/A	N/A		On hiatus since June 15, 2021
Wang Yulan (Chinese: 王雨兰; pinyin: Wáng Yǔlán)	January 9, 2002 (age 20)	Chongqing, Sichuan			SHY48 12	N/A	N/A	N/A		On hiatus since June 15, 2021
Tang Lin (Chinese: 唐霖; pinyin: Táng Lín)	March 21, 1999 (age 27)	Liaoning			N/A	N/A	N/A	N/A		On hiatus since June 15, 2021
Liu Yifei (Chinese: 刘一菲; pinyin: Liú Yīfēi)	December 7, 1996 (age 29)	Shandong		N/A	N/A	N/A	N/A	N/A		On hiatus since June 15, 2021
Cheng Yulu (Chinese: 程宇璐; pinyin: Chéng Yǔlù)	February 17, 1999 (age 23)	Zhejiang	Team Trainee				N/A	N/A		On hiatus since June 15, 2021
Chen Meijun (Chinese: 陈美君; pinyin: Chén Měijūn)	January 15, 1994 (age 32)	Guangzhou, Guangdong	Team B	N/A	N/A	43	N/A			On hiatus since September 28, 2019; Told to suspend all activities on August 7, 2019
Li Na (Chinese: 李娜; pinyin: Lǐ Nà)	September 22, 1997 (age 25)	Hebei	Team Trainee			N/A	N/A	N/A		On hiatus since June 15, 2021
Lv Rui (Chinese: 吕蕊; pinyin: Lǚ Ruǐ)	May 24	Hebei	Team Trainee					N/A		On hiatus since December 8, 2020
Hu Lizhi (Chinese: 胡丽芝; pinyin: Hú Lìzhī)	October 8, 2000 (age 26)	Hunan	Team B		N/A	66	N/A			On hiatus since January 2, 2020; Unofficially resigned on July 17, 2019
Lin Xihe (Chinese: 林溪荷; pinyin: Lín Xīhé)	June 20, 1998 (age 28)	Honghe, Yunnan	Team B	N/A	N/A	N/A	N/A			On hiatus since June 13, 2020; Unofficially resigned on April 3, 2020
Li Yuxuan (Chinese: 李瑜璇; pinyin: Lǐ Yúxuán)	November 7, 1997 (age 28)	Hubei	Team B			CKG48 13				On hiatus since May 25, 2019; Unofficially resigned on April 28, 2019
Niu Congcong (Chinese: 牛聪聪; pinyin: Niú Cōngcōng)	April 2, 1996 (age 30)	Beijing	Team B	BEJ48 5	BEJ48 9					On hiatus since February 2, 2018; Unofficially resigned on October 24, 2017
Sun Shan (Chinese: 孙姗; pinyin: Sūn Shān)	February 11, 1999 (age 27)	Ningbo, Zhejiang	Team B	48	BEJ48 8					On hiatus since February 2, 2018; Unofficially resigned on November 2, 2017
Xiong Sujun (Chinese: 熊素君; pinyin: Xióng Sùjūn)	September 9, 1994 (age 32)	Nanchang, Jiangxi	Team B	N/A	N/A	N/A	BEJ48 11			On hiatus since June 13, 2020; Unofficially resigned on February 12, 2020
Xia Yue (Chinese: 夏越; pinyin: Xià Yuè)	August 26, 1995 (age 31)	Chongqing	Team B	N/A						On hiatus from May 19, 2017 to October 1, 2017, and since May 17, 2018; Unofficially resigned on August 8, 2018
Yang Xin (Chinese: 杨鑫; pinyin: Yáng Xīn)	November 23, 2003 (age 22)	Beijing	Team B			N/A	N/A			On hiatus since January 2, 2020; Unofficially resigned on October 30, 2019
Zhou Jieyi (Chinese: 周洁艺; pinyin: Zhōu Jiéyì)	October 29, 1998 (age 27)	Jiangsu	Team B			N/A				On hiatus since January 19, 2019; Unofficially resigned on November 19, 2018
Zhang Yuhan (Chinese: 张羽涵; pinyin: Zhāng Yǔhán)	March 20, 1996 (age 30)	Luoyang, Henan	Team B		N/A	SHY48 11	N/A			On hiatus since June 13, 2020; Unofficially resigned on January 5, 2020
Chen Jiaohe (Chinese: 陈姣荷; pinyin: Chén Jiāohé)	April 20, 1995 (age 31)	Beijing	Team E	N/A	N/A					On hiatus since May 17, 2018; Unofficially resigned on November 17, 2017
Chen Yishan (Chinese: 陈亿杉; pinyin: Chén Yìshān)	June 29	Sichuan	Team E							On hiatus since June 13, 2020; Unofficially resigned on March 9, 2020
Feng Xinduo (Chinese: 冯薪朵; pinyin: Féng Xīnduǒ) (Note: Concurrent member of SNH48 Team NIII and BEJ48 Team E.)	January 24, 1992 (age 34)	Dalian, Liaoning	Team E	5	4	3	N/A			On hiatus since June 13, 2020; Unofficially resigned on January 22, 2020
Huang Zixuan (Chinese: 黄子璇; pinyin: Huáng Zǐxuán)	May 20, 2002 (age 24)	Beijing	Team E		N/A					On hiatus since May 17, 2018
Li Liman (Chinese: 李丽满; pinyin: Lǐ Lìmǎn)	November 1, 1999 (age 26)	Guangdong	Team E							On hiatus since May 25, 2019; Unofficially resigned on March 7, 2019.
Li Shiyan (Chinese: 李诗彦; pinyin: Lǐ Shīyàn)	March 17, 2003 (age 23)	Changsha, Hunan	Team E	N/A			N/A			On hiatus from April 22, 2017 to August 18, 2018, and since January 2, 2020; Unofficially resigned on August 25, 2019
Li Xiang (Chinese: 李想; pinyin: Lǐ Xiǎng)	February 5, 1994 (age 32)	Beijing	Team E	N/A	BEJ48 12	N/A				On hiatus since January 19, 2019; Unofficially resigned on November 10, 2018; held her last event on November 18
Li Yuanyuan (Chinese: 李媛媛; pinyin: Lǐ Yuányuán)	July 1, 1994 (age 32)	Xiamen, Fujian	Team E	N/A	57	N/A				On hiatus since January 19, 2019; Unofficially resigned on July 21, 2018; held her last event on August 5
Li Zi (Chinese: 李梓; pinyin: Lǐ Zǐ)	August 30, 2000 (age 26)	Neijiang, Sichuan	Team E	27	46	57	BEJ48 14			On hiatus since January 2, 2020; Unofficially resigned on September 15, 2019
Yang Yifan (Chinese: 杨一帆; pinyin: Yáng Yīfān)	May 17, 1997 (age 29)	Xinjiang	Team E		N/A	N/A	N/A			On hiatus since June 13, 2020; Unofficially resigned on September 17, 2019, held her last event on October 5, 2020.
Zhang Aijing (Chinese: 张爱静; pinyin: Zhāng Àijìng)	August 3, 1997 (age 29)	Sichuan	Team E		N/A	SHY48 14	N/A			On hiatus since June 13, 2020; Unofficially resigned on May 29, 2020, held her last event on June 7, 2020.
Zang Cong (Chinese: 臧聪; pinyin: Zàng Cōng)	February 21, 1998 (age 28)	Liaocheng, Shandong	Team E		N/A	N/A				On hiatus since May 25, 2019; Unofficially resigned on May 14, 2019
Zhang Dandan (Chinese: 张丹丹; pinyin: Zhāng Dāndān)	October 2	Hebei	Team E			N/A				On hiatus since May 25, 2019; Unofficially resigned on May 22, 2019
Zhao Di'er (Chinese: 赵笛儿; pinyin: Zhào Dí'ér)	September 4, 2000 (age 26)	Taiyuan, Shanxi	Team E		N/A					On hiatus since May 17, 2018; Told to suspend all activities on March 11, 2018
Zeng Jie (Chinese: 曾洁; pinyin: Zēng Jié)	December 10, 1995 (age 30)	Jiangxi	Team E							On hiatus since June 13, 2020; Unofficially resigned on March 9, 2020
Chen Yayu (Chinese: 陈雅钰; pinyin: Chén Yǎyù)	October 4, 1996 (age 30)	Hubei	Team J		N/A	N/A	N/A			On hiatus since June 13, 2020; Unofficially resigned on September 1, 2019
Du Yaxuan (Chinese: 杜亚轩; pinyin: Dù Yàxuān)	August 18, 1995 (age 31)	Tianjin	Team J							On hiatus since June 13, 2020; Unofficially resigned in February 2020
Fang Lei (Chinese: 房蕾; pinyin: Fáng Lěi)	July 21, 1997 (age 29)	Rizhao, Shandong	Team J		N/A	N/A	N/A			On hiatus since June 13, 2020; Unofficially resigned on September 3, 2019
Ge Siqi (Chinese: 葛司琪; pinyin: Gé Sīqí)	September 8, 1997 (age 29)	Harbin, Heilongjiang	Team J		N/A	60	N/A			On hiatus since June 13, 2020; Unofficially resigned on April 17, 2020, held her last event on May 5, 2020.
Han Jiale (Chinese: 韩家乐; pinyin: Hán Jiālè)	April 24, 1996 (age 30)	Changde, Hunan	Team J		37	24	N/A		N/A	On hiatus since June 13, 2020, Rejoined SNH48 on April 11 2021
Lou Shu (Chinese: 楼澍; pinyin: Lóu Shù)	February 20, 2001 (age 25)	Zhejiang	Team J			N/A				On hiatus since May 25, 2019; Unofficially resigned on March 8, 2019
Ren Xinyi (Chinese: 任心怡; pinyin: Rén Xīnyí)	October 18, 1996 (age 29)	Shanxi	Team J		N/A	N/A	N/A			On hiatus since September 28, 2019; Told to suspend all activities on August 16, 2019
Shi Yusha (Chinese: 石羽莎; pinyin: Shí Yǔshā)	June 20, 2002 (age 24)	Beijing	Team J		N/A					On hiatus since May 17, 2018
Wang Yuxuan (Chinese: 王雨煊; pinyin: Wáng Yǔxuān)	May 23, 1999 (age 27)	Henan	Team J		N/A	53	BEJ48 13			On hiatus since June 13, 2020
Xiong Wenjie (Chinese: 熊文婕; pinyin: Xióng Wénjié)	August 18	Tianjin	Team J							On hiatus since June 13, 2020; Unofficially resigned on April 1, 2020
Ye Miaomiao (Chinese: 叶苗苗; pinyin: Yè Miáomiáo)	July 13, 1999 (age 27)	Anhui	Team J		N/A	N/A	N/A			On hiatus since June 13, 2020; Unofficially resigned on May 27, 2020, told to suspend all activities on the same day
Fu Yixuan (Chinese: 付奕萱; pinyin: Fù Yìxuān)	January 19	Sichuan	Team Trainee			N/A				On hiatus since January 19, 2019; Unofficially resigned on January 25, 2019

=== Former members ===
==== Graduated members ====
Name _{(Birth date, birthplace)}	Team	Election rank					Notes
Name _{(Birth date, birthplace)}	Team	3	4	5	6	7	Notes
Chen Yifei (Chinese: 陈逸菲; pinyin: Chén Yìfēi) (June 18, 1996 in Shanghai)	Team B						Graduated on July 8, 2017; Listed as hiatus from April 20, 2017 to July 8, 2017; Currently being employed in the Shanghai Higher People's Court
Zhang Hanxiao (Chinese: 张菡筱; pinyin: Zhāng Hánxiǎo) (June 26, 1996 in Sichuan)	Team B	N/A					Graduated on December 22, 2017; Listed as hiatus from April 20, 2017 to December 22, 2017
Feng Xueying (Chinese: 冯雪莹; pinyin: Féng Xuěyíng) (March 13, 1994 in Hubei)	Team B	N/A					Graduated on January 19, 2019; On hiatus from May 19, 2017 to January 19, 2019; Unofficially resigned in March 2017
Hu Bowen (Chinese: 胡博文; pinyin: Hú Bówén) (December 18, 1999 in Xuzhou, Jiangsu)	Team B	N/A					Graduated on January 19, 2019; On hiatus from April 20, 2017 to January 19, 2019; Unofficially resigned on March 10, 2017
Liu Chongtian (Chinese: 刘崇恬; pinyin: Liú Chóngtián) (September 17, 1995 in Jiangsu)	Team B		N/A				Graduated on January 19, 2019; On hiatus from May 17, 2018 to January 19, 2019; Unofficially resigned in February 2018
Li Muyao (Chinese: 李沐遥; pinyin: Lǐ Mùyáo) (August 3 in Qinghai)	Team B		N/A				Graduated on January 19, 2019; On hiatus from February 2, 2018; Unofficially resigned on July 16, 2017
Song Sixian (Chinese: 宋思娴; pinyin: Sòng Sīxián) (October 9, 1997 in Bengbu, Anhui)	Team B	N/A	N/A				Graduated on January 19, 2019; On hiatus from May 17, 2018 to January 19, 2019; Unofficially resigned on May 2, 2018
Wen Yan (Chinese: 文妍; pinyin: Wén Yán) (December 28, 2000 in Chongqing)	Team B	N/A					Graduated on January 19, 2019; On hiatus from May 19, 2017 to January 19, 2019; Unofficially resigned on May 5, 2017
Wu Yueli (Chinese: 吴月黎; pinyin: Wú Yuèlí) (May 15, 2000 in Liuan, Anhui)	Team B						Graduated on January 19, 2019; On hiatus from May 19, 2017 to January 19, 2019; Unofficially resigned in June 2017
Xu Jiali (Chinese: 徐佳丽; pinyin: Xú Jiālì) (September 21, 1996 in Nanchang, Jiangxi)	Team B	N/A					Graduated on January 19, 2019; On hiatus from April 20, 2017 to January 19, 2019; Unofficially resigned on April 18, 2017
Zheng Yiling (Chinese: 郑依灵; pinyin: Zhèng Yīlíng) (November 8, 1998 in Anhui)	Team B		N/A				Graduated on January 19, 2019; On hiatus from February 2, 2018 to January 19, 2019; Unofficially resigned on September 1, 2017
Bi Mengyuan (Chinese: 毕梦媛; pinyin: Bì Mèngyuán) (January 29, 1997 in Dalian, Liaoning)	Team E	N/A					Graduated on January 19, 2019; On hiatus from April 20, 2017 to January 19, 2019; Unofficially resigned in February 2017
Jin Xin (Chinese: 金鑫; pinyin: Jīn Xīn) (September 2, 2000 in Anhui)	Team E						Graduated on January 19, 2019; On hiatus from May 17, 2018 to January 19, 2019; Unofficially resigned on March 18, 2018
Lin Kun (Chinese: 林堃; pinyin: Lín Kūn) (October 30, 1996 in Chongqing)	Team E	N/A					Graduated on January 19, 2019; On hiatus from April 20, 2017 to January 19, 2019; Unofficially resigned in March 2017
Li Na (Chinese: 李娜; pinyin: Lǐ Nà) (May 1, 1996 in Jining, Shandong)	Team E		N/A				Graduated on January 19, 2019; On hiatus from May 17, 2018 to January 19, 2019; Unofficially resigned on April 10, 2018; held her last event on April 22
Li Ye (Chinese: 李烨; pinyin: Lǐ Yè) (June 17 in Liaoning)	Team E						Graduated on January 19, 2019; On hiatus from May 19, 2017 to January 19, 2019; Unofficially resigned in May 2017
Li Zongyi (Chinese: 李宗颐; pinyin: Lǐ Zōngyí) (September 25, 1996 in Beijing)	Team E						Graduated on January 19, 2019; On hiatus from May 17, 2018 to January 19, 2019; Unofficially resigned on March 2, 2018
Xu Jing (Chinese: 徐静; pinyin: Xú Jìng) (September 26, 1997 in Hangzhou, Zhejiang)	Team E		N/A				Graduated on January 19, 2019; On hiatus from February 2, 2018 to January 19, 2019; Unofficially resigned on October 24, 2017
Yi Yanqian (Chinese: 易妍倩; pinyin: Yì Yánqiàn) (November 28, 1997 in Yueyang, Hunan)	Team E	N/A					Graduated on January 19, 2019; On hiatus from April 20, 2017 to January 19, 2019; Unofficially resigned on March 10, 2017
Shan Xiwen (Chinese: 单习文; pinyin: Shàn Xíwén) (January 31, 1997 in Chuzhou, Anhui)	Team J						Graduated on January 19, 2019; On hiatus from April 20, 2017 to January 19, 2019; Unofficially resigned in December 2016
Zheng Xinyu (Chinese: 郑心雨; pinyin: Zhèng Xīnyǔ) (April 27, 2001 in Beijing)	Team J						Graduated on January 19, 2019; On hiatus from April 22, 2017 to January 19, 2019; Unofficially resigned on May 22, 2017
Wang Jiayu (Chinese: 王嘉瑜; pinyin: Wáng Jiāyú) (May 2, 2002 in Chongqing)	Team E			N/A			Graduated on September 28, 2019, and Joined IDOLS Ft on October 5, 2019; On hiatus from May 25, 2019 to September 28, 2019
Zheng Jieli (Chinese: 郑洁丽; pinyin: Zhèng Jiélì) (June 21, 1995 in Jieyang, Guangdong)	Team J		SHY48 8	SHY48 8			Graduated on September 28, 2019; On hiatus from May 25, 2019 to September 28, 2019; Unofficially resigned on March 11, 2019

==== Transferred members ====
Name	Birth date (age)	Transfer...		Election rank				
Name	Birth date (age)	From	To	3	4	5	6	7
Mao Qiyu (Chinese: 毛其羽; pinyin: Máo Qíyǔ)	December 1, 1998 (age 27)	Team B	IDOLS Ft		N/A	N/A		
Luo Xueli (Chinese: 罗雪丽; pinyin: Luó Xuělì)	June 6, 2000 (age 26)	Team E	IDOLS Ft	N/A	N/A	N/A		
Lan Hao (Chinese: 兰昊; pinyin: Lán Hào)	November 27	Team J	IDOLS Ft		N/A	N/A		
Li Hongyao (Chinese: 李泓瑶; pinyin: Lǐ Hóngyáo)	March 30, 2000 (age 26)	Team J	IDOLS Ft		N/A	N/A		
Qiao Yuke (Chinese: 乔钰珂; pinyin: Qiáo Yùkē)	March 23, 2000 (age 26)	Team J	IDOLS Ft		N/A	N/A		
Ren Yuelin (Chinese: 任玥霖; pinyin: Rén Yuèlín)	October 23, 2001 (age 24)	Team J	IDOLS Ft		N/A	N/A		
Xu Wanyu (Chinese: 许婉玉; pinyin: Xǔ Wǎnyù)	October 12, 2000 (age 26)	Team J	IDOLS Ft		N/A	N/A		
Zhang-Han Zimo (Chinese: 张韩紫陌; pinyin: Zhāng-Hán Zǐmò)	January 31, 2000 (age 26)	Team J	IDOLS Ft		N/A	N/A		
Gao Weiran (Chinese: 高蔚然; pinyin: Gāo Wèirán) (Note: On hiatus from May 25, 2019 to May 15, 2020, unofficially resigned on May 26, 2019)	October 8, 1997 (age 29)	Team E	IDOLS Ft			N/A		N/A

==== Former trainees ====
- Li Hailin (Chinese: 李海淋; pinyin: Lǐ Hǎilín) (November 30 in Sichuan) transferred to IDOLS Ft on January 19, 2019
- Li Qingyu (Chinese: 李清雨; pinyin: Lǐ Qīngyǔ) (April 6, 1998 (age 28) in Guizhou) transferred to IDOLS Ft on January 19, 2019
- Xiong Yiyi (Chinese: 熊依依; pinyin: Xióng Yīyī) (October 5 in Hubei) transferred to IDOLS Ft on January 19, 2019, unofficially resigned on January 4, 2019
- Yang Yuxin (Chinese: 杨宇馨; pinyin: Yáng Yǔxīn) (November 7, 1998 (age 27) in Henan) transferred to IDOLS Ft on January 19, 2019
- Zhang Yuqian (Chinese: 张语倩; pinyin: Zhāng Yǔqiàn) (April 3 in Enshi, Hubei) transferred to IDOLS Ft on January 19, 2019

== Discography ==
=== EPs ===
- 1st EP: "The Awaking" (Chinese: 元气觉醒) - Released on September 6, 2016
- 2nd EP: "Smiling Sunflower" (Chinese: 微笑的向日葵) - Released on January 6, 2017
- 3rd EP: "Manifesto" (Chinese: 宣言) - Released on April 1, 2017
- 4th EP: "Variety Exclamation Mark" (Chinese: 百变惊叹号) - Released on September 29, 2017
- 5th EP: "Once Upon the Light of Dawn" (Chinese: 晨曦下的我们) - Released on March 27, 2019

== Concerts ==
Title	Date	Place	Memo
2016
BEJ48杭州的首场粉丝见面会; BEJ48 Team E Mini Concert in Hangzhou	28 October	Zhejiang University of Media and Communications	Team E only
