= Balala =

Balala may refer to:

== Balala the Fairies ==
- Balala the Fairies, Chinese magical girl metaseries created and produced by Alpha Group
  - Balala the Fairies: The Movie, 2013 live-action adaptation of the animated series
  - Balala the Fairies: The Magic Trial, 2014 live-action adaptation of the animated series
  - Balala the Fairies: Princess Camellia, 2015 live-action adaptation of the animated series

== People ==
- Ahmed bin Abdullah Balala (born 1967), Indian politician
- Najib Balala (born 1967), Kenyan politician
- Viktor Balala (born 1961), Transnistrian politician

== Other uses ==
- Balala (leafhopper), a genus of Hylicinae

== See also ==
- Veera Ballala (disambiguation)
- Balala Hakkula Sangham, an Indian community opposing child marriage, sexual abuse and child labour
