= List of SNH48 members =

List of members of the Chinese idol girl group SNH48

SNH48 is a Chinese idol girl group formed in 2012. As of July 2, 2022, the group consists of 71 regular members, divided into several teams: Team SII with 19 members, Team NII with 17 members, Team HII with 17 members and Team X with 18 members. 3 members are classified as understudies. In addition, 1 member is listed as an overseas trainee. 73 members are currently listed as on temporary hiatus, although most of them have unofficially resigned.

Members are recruited during auditions that are held roughly every half a year. Initially, they are announced as understudies before being promoted to their various teams, however, this practice was discontinued between 2016 and 2017 during the introduction of its sixth and seventh-generation members, and since 2019, after the second Team Shuffle. When they get older, they "graduate" from the group.

Following AKB48's format, SNH48 holds General Elections every year to determine the popularity of its members. To obtain a ballot, voters have to buy the group's latest "election single", or sign up on its official app. Members that receive higher votes get to be part of the group's next EP and are heavily promoted. The highest-ranked member will not only become the centre performer during the group's live performances, but would also get the opportunity to release a solo EP and music video, and hold a solo concert.

The results from SNH48's annual general elections from 2014 onwards are included. Dark grey cells indicate that the member did not take part in that election. Light grey cells marked "N/A" indicate the member took part in the election but did not rank.

Members are listed by order below as they appear on the official website's roster as of July 2, 2022.

Also a member of 7Senses
Also a member of HO2
Also a member of BlueV
Also a member of DeMoon

== Team SII ==
Team SII is associated with the color blue. The current captain is Duan Yixuan.

Name	Birth date (age)	Birthplace	Election rank								Popularity rank
Name	Birth date (age)	Birthplace	1	2	3	4	5	6	7	8	9
Bei Chuhan (Chinese: 贝楚涵; pinyin: Bèi Chǔhán)	September 7, 2005 (age 21)	Shanghai									N/A
Chen Yuzi (Chinese: 陈雨孜; pinyin: Chén Yǔzī)	June 29, 1998 (age 28)	Shanghai							N/A	N/A	N/A
Duan Yixuan (Chinese: 段艺璇; pinyin: Duàn Yìxuán)	August 19, 1995 (age 31)	Chenzhou, Hunan			43	13	15	3	6	5	2
Huang Enru (Chinese: 黄恩茹; pinyin: Huáng Ēnrú)	May 5, 1997 (age 29)	Wenzhou, Zhejiang				BEJ48 10	38	41	N/A	N/A	N/A
Li Hui (Chinese: 李慧; pinyin: Lǐ Huì)	November 8, 1996 (age 29)	Hebei				N/A	SHY48 6	N/A	31	N/A	N/A
Liu Qianqian (Chinese: 刘倩倩; pinyin: Liú Qiànqiàn)	November 28, 1994 (age 31)	Fujian			N/A	66	55	GNZ48 16	N/A	N/A	36
Lu Xinyi (Chinese: 芦馨怡; pinyin: Lú Xīnyí)	October 29, 2001 (age 24)	Wenzhou, Zhejiang									N/A
Liu Zengyan (Chinese: 刘增艳; pinyin: Liú Zēngyàn)	August 31, 1996 (age 30)	Chengdu, Sichuan			N/A	63	30	30	21	25	28
Ma Yuling (Chinese: 马玉灵; pinyin: Mǎ Yùlíng)	October 6, 1999 (age 26)	Jianyang, Sichuan				N/A	35	N/A	BEJ48 11		32
Ning Ke (Chinese: 宁轲; pinyin: Níng Kē)	May 2, 2000 (age 26)	Sichuan							N/A	N/A	N/A
Peng Jiamin (Chinese: 彭嘉敏; pinyin: Péng Jiāmǐn)	September 29, 1999 (age 26)	Guangzhou						N/A	N/A	N/A	N/A
Shen Xiao'ai (Chinese: 沈小爱; pinyin: Shěn Xiǎoài)	December 7, 1995 (age 30)	Guangzhou				N/A	N/A	39	BEJ48 9	34	N/A
Shao Xuecong (Chinese: 邵雪聪; pinyin: Shào Xuěcōng)	August 28, 1996 (age 30)	Shijiazhuang, Hebei		19	44	N/A	N/A	N/A		N/A	27
Tian Shuli (Chinese: 田姝丽; pinyin: Tián Shūlì)	November 9, 1996 (age 29)	Jiangsu				N/A	N/A	BEJ48 12	43	N/A	33
Wang Qiuru (Chinese: 王秋茹; pinyin: Wáng Qiūrú)	October 2, 2003 (age 22)	Liaoning							N/A		N/A
You Miao (Chinese: 由淼; pinyin: Yóu Miǎo)	August 5, 1998 (age 28)	Qingdao, Shandong							48	30	38
Yan Mingjun (Chinese: 闫明筠; pinyin: Yán Míngyǔn)	February 11, 1998 (age 28)	Henan		N/A	N/A	N/A	65	N/A	N/A	39	N/A
Zhu Hanjia (Chinese: 朱涵佳; pinyin: Zhū Hánjiā)	February 18, 2004 (age 22)	Hong Kong									N/A
Zhao Tianyang (Chinese: 赵天杨; pinyin: Zhào Tiānyáng)	December 25, 1995 (age 30)	Inner Mongolia					N/A	N/A	BEJ48 12	N/A	N/A

== Team NII ==
Team NII is associated with the color purple. The current captain is Zhao Jiarui .

Name	Birth date (age)	Birthplace	Election rank								Popularity rank
Name	Birth date (age)	Birthplace	1	2	3	4	5	6	7	8	9
Bai Xinyu (Chinese: 柏欣妤; pinyin: Bǎi Xīnyú)	January 25, 1997 (age 29)	Jiangsu					CKG48 2	BEJ48 15	41	33	22
Han Jiale (Chinese: 韩家乐; pinyin: Hán Jiālè)	April 24, 1996 (age 30)	Changde, Hunan				37	24	N/A		N/A	15
Hu Xiaohui (Chinese: 胡晓慧; pinyin: Hú Xiǎohuì)	September 16, 1998 (age 27)	Henan		N/A	BEJ48 6	34	39	28	BEJ48 14	20	18
Liu Jie (Chinese: 刘洁; pinyin: Liú Jié)	August 1, 2001 (age 25)	Jiangsu						N/A	N/A	N/A	N/A
Liu Shuxian (Chinese: 刘姝贤; pinyin: Liú Shūxián)	April 16, 1994 (age 32)	Zaozhuang, Shandong			N/A	35	59	26	N/A	26	17
Lu Tianhui (Chinese: 卢天惠; pinyin: Lú Tiānhuì)	December 8, 2000 (age 25)	Shenyang, Liaoning				N/A	SHY48 7	N/A	44	N/A	N/A
Liu Xian (Chinese: 刘闲; pinyin: Liú Xián)	September 27, 1997 (age 28)	Hubei				N/A	N/A	N/A	N/A	N/A	N/A
Qing Yuwen (Chinese: 青钰雯; pinyin: Qīng Yùwén)	January 18, 1997 (age 29)	Nanchuan, Sichuan			BEJ48 4	BEJ48 16	47	44	22	46	46
Su Shanshan (Chinese: 苏杉杉; pinyin: Sū Shānshān)	March 23, 1997 (age 29)	Suizhou, Hubei			BEJ48 7	21	14	14	7	22	25
Yan Qin (Chinese: 颜沁; pinyin: Yán Qìn)	November 23, 2000 (age 25)	Changsha, Hunan						N/A	N/A	N/A	40
Yang Yuxin (Chinese: 杨宇馨; pinyin: Yáng Yǔxīn)	November 7, 2000 (age 25)	Henan					N/A	N/A	N/A	N/A	N/A
Zhang Huaijin (Chinese: 张怀瑾; pinyin: Zhāng Huáijǐn)	May 11, 1997 (age 29)	Shenyang, Liaoning				N/A	BEJ48 4	25	BEJ48 10	N/A	N/A
Zhao Jiarui (Chinese: 赵佳蕊; pinyin: Zhào Jiāruì)	November 19, 2000 (age 25)	Mudanjiang, Heilongjiang				SHY48 3	46	N/A	N/A	44	N/A
Zhang Ruijie (Chinese: 张睿婕; pinyin: Zhāng Ruìjié)	May 7, 1998 (age 28)	Shaanxi							N/A	N/A	N/A
Zhou Shiyu (Chinese: 周诗雨; pinyin: Zhōu Shīyǔ)	April 11, 1998 (age 28)	Jiangsu					N/A	27	40	12	5
Zhang Xi (Chinese: 张茜; pinyin: Zhāng Xī)	August 27, 1994 (age 32)	Gansu					N/A	N/A	N/A	N/A	N/A
Zhang Xiaoying (Chinese: 张笑盈; pinyin: Zhāng Xiàoyíng)	August 21, 1995 (age 31)	Dazhou, Sichuan			N/A	N/A	N/A	N/A	BEJ48 16	N/A	N/A

== Team HII ==
Team HII is associated with the color orange. The current captain is Shen Mengyao.

Name	Birth date (age)	Birthplace	Election rank								Popularity rank
Name	Birth date (age)	Birthplace	1	2	3	4	5	6	7	8	9
Fei Qinyuan (Chinese: 费沁源; pinyin: Fèi Qìnyuán)	March 20, 2001 (age 25)	Shanghai			22	40	32	15	14	16	24
Feng Sijia (Chinese: 冯思佳; pinyin: Féng Sījiā)	January 3, 1999 (age 27)	Zhejiang			N/A	N/A	29	N/A	N/A	N/A	41
Hao Jingyi (Chinese: 郝婧怡; pinyin: Hǎo Jìngyí)	February 23, 1999 (age 27)	Xi'an, Shaanxi					N/A	N/A	N/A	N/A	37
Jiang Shan (Chinese: 姜杉; pinyin: Jiāng Shān)	October 6, 1995 (age 30)	Zhengzhou, Henan			32	19	28	31	N/A	32	30
Jiang Shuting (Chinese: 蒋舒婷; pinyin: Jiǎng Shūtíng)	June 18, 2002 (age 24)	Zhejiang			N/A	N/A	N/A	N/A	N/A	41	21
Li Jia'en (Chinese: 李佳恩; pinyin: Lǐ Jiā'ēn)	June 7, 2000 (age 26)	Xi'an, Shaanxi			N/A	N/A	N/A		20	28	N/A
Lin Shuqing (Chinese: 林舒晴; pinyin: Lín Shūqíng)	May 28, 2000 (age 26)	Fuzhou, Fujian					CKG48 6	N/A	N/A	43	35
Nong Yanping (Chinese: 农燕萍; pinyin: Nóng Yànpíng) (Note: Concurrent member of GNZ48 Team Z and SNH48 Team HII)	July 30, 1994 (age 32)	Nanning, Guangxi				N/A	N/A	N/A	N/A	N/A	34
Shen Mengyao (Chinese: 沈梦瑶; pinyin: Shěn Mèngyáo)	August 14, 1998 (age 28)	Shanghai			N/A	65	49	16	4	3	1
Sun Yushan (Chinese: 孙语姗; pinyin: Sūn Yǔshān)	September 13, 2000 (age 26)	Zibo, Shandong				N/A	N/A	N/A	N/A	N/A	N/A
Sun Zhenni (Chinese: 孙珍妮; pinyin: Sūn Zhēnnī)	May 5, 2000 (age 26)	Shanghai			21	22	56	N/A	30	23	N/A
Wang Yi (Chinese: 王奕; pinyin: Wáng Yì)	June 6, 2001 (age 25)	Suzhou, Jiangsu					N/A	N/A	N/A	9	4
Xu-Yang Yuzhuo (Chinese: 许杨玉琢; pinyin: Xǔ-Yáng Yùzhuó)	September 25, 1995 (age 30)	Yueyang, Hunan		N/A	19	27	52	22	10	6	12
Yuan Yiqi (Chinese: 袁一琦; pinyin: Yuán Yīqí)	March 19, 2000 (age 26)	Deyang, Sichuan				56	N/A	21	12	2	3
Zhang Xin (Chinese: 张昕; pinyin: Zhāng Xīn) (Note: Concurrent member of GNZ48 Team NIII, with effect on May 1, 2019.)	October 19, 1995 (age 30)	Guangzhou, Guangdong		N/A	N/A	N/A	N/A	20	11	11	13
Zhang Yueming (Chinese: 张月铭; pinyin: Zhāng Yuèmíng)	October 7, 1998 (age 27)	Jilin								N/A	N/A

== Team X ==
Team X is associated with the color light green. The current captain is Wang Ruiqi.

Name	Birth date (age)	Birthplace	Election rank								Popularity rank
Name	Birth date (age)	Birthplace	1	2	3	4	5	6	7	8	9
Chen Lin (Chinese: 陈琳; pinyin: Chén Lín)	July 23, 1998 (age 28)	Shanghai		N/A	N/A	54	N/A	N/A	46	N/A	N/A
He-Yang Qingqing (Chinese: 何阳青青; pinyin: Héyáng Qīngqīng)	July 21, 1997 (age 29)	Hubei					N/A	N/A	BEJ48 15	N/A	N/A
Lin Jiayi (Chinese: 林佳怡; pinyin: Lín Jiāyí)	January 13, 2000 (age 26)	Wenzhou, Zhejiang								N/A	N/A
Liu Shengnan (Chinese: 刘胜男; pinyin: Líu Shèngnán)	September 9, 1997 (age 29)	Hubei			N/A	BEJ48 7	N/A	35	33	N/A	N/A
Lü Yi (Chinese: 吕一; pinyin: Lǚ Yī)	June 27, 1997 (age 29)	Chongqing				36	N/A	N/A	N/A	N/A	N/A
Ran Wei (Chinese: 冉蔚; pinyin: Rǎn Wèi)	May 21, 1999 (age 27)	Chengdu, Sichuan					CKG48 1	N/A	38	N/A	N/A
Song Xinran (Chinese: 宋昕冉; pinyin: Sòng Xīnrǎn)	July 8, 1997 (age 29)	Jinan, Shandong		23	18	29	19	8	3	4	11
Wang Feiyan (Chinese: 王菲妍; pinyin: Wáng Fēiyán)	January 27, 2000 (age 26)	Dandong, Liaoning				N/A	SHY48 16	N/A	N/A	N/A	N/A
Wang Ruiqi (Chinese: 王睿琦; pinyin: Wáng Ruìqí)	December 15, 1999 (age 26)	Hohhot, Inner Mongolia				N/A		N/A	26	37	47
Wang Xiaojia (Chinese: 王晓佳; pinyin: Wáng Xiǎojiā)	May 31, 1993 (age 33)	Changsha, Hunan			45	43	N/A	29	13	8	
Wu Bohan (Chinese: 武博涵; pinyin: Wǔ Bóhán)	January 23, 2000 (age 26)	Jiuquan, Gansu								N/A	N/A
Wang Yiliu (Chinese: 王依柳; pinyin: Wáng Yīliǔ)	July 13, 2000 (age 26)	Beijing									N/A
Xie Tianyi (Chinese: 谢天依; pinyin: Xiè Tiānyī)	June 24, 1998 (age 28)	Beijing		N/A	N/A	N/A	N/A	N/A	N/A	N/A	N/A
Xiong Ziyi (Chinese: 熊紫轶; pinyin: Xióng Zǐyì)	May 31, 2000 (age 26)	Taizhou, Jiangsu									N/A
Yang Bingyi (Chinese: 杨冰怡; pinyin: Yáng Bīngyí)	July 26, 2000 (age 26)	Haikou, Hainan		N/A	39	25	23	33	9	7	7
Yu Jiawei (Chinese: 禹佳蔚; pinyin: Yǔ Jiāwèi)	June 7, 2005 (age 21)	Shanghai								N/A	N/A
Yan Na (Chinese: 闫娜; pinyin: Yán Nà)	July 27, 1998 (age 28)	Shanxi								N/A	N/A
Zuo Jingyuan (Chinese: 左婧媛; pinyin: Zuǒ Jìngyuán)	August 19, 1998 (age 28)	Luzhou, Sichuan			N/A	GNZ48 12	42	18	8	10	8

== Understudies ==
Name	Birth date (age)	Birthplace	Election rank								Popularity rank
Name	Birth date (age)	Birthplace	1	2	3	4	5	6	7	8	
Guo Shuang (Chinese: 郭爽; pinyin: Guō Shuǎng)	June 19, 2000 (age 26)	Sichuan						N/A	N/A	47	N/A
Pan Yingqi (Chinese: 潘瑛琪; pinyin: Pān Yīngqí)	September 27, 1998 (age 27)	Shanghai			N/A	N/A	N/A	N/A	N/A	N/A	N/A
Xu Shiqi (Chinese: 徐诗琪; pinyin: Xú Shīqí) (Note: On hiatus from November 2, 2018 to July 10, 2021 Unofficially resigned on October 20, 2018)	December 10, 1998 (age 27)	Ningbo, Zhejiang				N/A	45			N/A	N/A

== Overseas Trainees ==
Members between 16 and 18 are chosen to train at SNH48 Group's overseas idols training center professionally.

Name	Birth date (age)	Birthplace	Election rank								Popularity rank
Name	Birth date (age)	Birthplace	1	2	3	4	5	6	7	8	9
Gao Chong (Chinese: 高崇; pinyin: Gāo Chóng)	November 16, 2002 (age 23)	Harbin, Heilongjiang				N/A	N/A				

== Substitute Members ==
Name	Birth date (age)	Birthplace	Election rank								Popularity rank	Notes
Name	Birth date (age)	Birthplace	1	2	3	4	5	6	7	8	9	Notes
Gao Xueyi (Chinese: 高雪逸; pinyin: Gāo Xuěyì)	October 27, 2000 (age 25)	Chongqing				N/A	N/A		N/A			Announced on October 6, 2020; Member of Idols Ft; Subbing for Team HII
Nong Yanping (Chinese: 农燕萍; pinyin: Nóng Yànpíng)	July 30, 1994 (age 32)	Nanning, Guangxi				N/A	N/A	N/A	N/A	N/A	34	Announced on October 11, 2020; Member of GNZ48; Subbing for Team HII
Zhou Qianyu (Chinese: 周倩玉; pinyin: Zhōu Qiànyù)	April 18, 2000 (age 26)	Neijiang, Sichuan)			N/A							Announced on October 11, 2020; Member of Idols Ft; Subbing for Team X

== Hiatus ==
Zhao Jiamin has placed first in the 2nd Senbatsu Elections.

Name	Birth date (age)	Birthplace	Team	Election rank								Popularity rank	Notes
Name	Birth date (age)	Birthplace	Team	1	2	3	4	5	6	7	8	9	Notes
Bian Chuxian (Chinese: 卞楚娴; pinyin: Biàn Chǔxián)	March 23, 1998 (age 28)	Nanjing, Jiangsu								N/A	N/A		On hiatus since October 11, 2021; Unofficially resigned on September 9, 2021
Liu Liqian (Chinese: 刘丽千; pinyin: Liú Lìqiān)	July 13, 2000 (age 26)	Wuhan, Hubei							N/A	N/A			On hiatus since August 18, 2021; Unofficially resigned on July 2, 2020, held her last event on August 12, 2020
Chen Junyu (Chinese: 陈俊羽; pinyin: Chén Jùnyǔ)	November 16, 2002 (age 23)	Sichuan	Team SII					N/A	N/A				On hiatus since May 20, 2020; Unofficially resigned on April 2, 2020, held her last event on April 7, 2020
Feng Yuting (Chinese: 冯雨停; pinyin: Féng Yǔtíng)	September 17, 1996 (age 29)	Jiangsu	Team SII										On hiatus since June 4, 2021; Unofficially resigned on April 7, 2021
Liu Chenxue (Chinese: 刘晨雪; pinyin: Liú Chénxuě)	June 19, 2000 (age 26)	Shanghai	Team SII										On hiatus since January 28, 2021
Lu Yehui (Chinese: 陆叶卉; pinyin: Lù Yèhuì)	July 14, 1998 (age 28)	Sichuan	Team SII										On hiatus since June 4, 2021; Unofficially resigned on June 5, 2021
Wang Beini (Chinese: 王贝妮; pinyin: Wáng Bèinī)	January 16, 1996 (age 30)	Anhui	Team SII										On hiatus since June 13, 2020; Unofficially resigned in June 2020
Xu Zixuan (Chinese: 徐子轩; pinyin: Xú Zǐxuān)	March 30, 1998 (age 28)	Shenyang, Liaoning	Team SII	N/A	N/A	35	42	22	36				On hiatus since September 27, 2019; Unofficially resigned on August 19, 2019, held her last event on October 19, 2019
Yuan Danni (Chinese: 袁丹妮; pinyin: Yuán Dānnī)	August 7, 1994 (age 32)	Tianshui, Gansu	Team SII		N/A	N/A	N/A	N/A	N/A				On hiatus since January 10, 2020; Unofficially resigned on July 31, 2019, held her last event on August 7, 2019
Yang Lingyi (Chinese: 杨令仪; pinyin: Yáng Lìngyí)	April 15, 1994 (age 32)	Hubei	Team SII					N/A					On hiatus since April 30, 2019; Unofficially resigned on May 12, 2019
Zhao Jiamin (Chinese: 赵嘉敏; pinyin: Zhào Jiāmǐn)	July 22, 1998 (age 28)	Shenzhen, Guangdong	Team SII	3	1								On hiatus since July 30, 2016; Unofficially resigned on July 22, 2016
Zhu Xiaodan (Chinese: 朱小丹; pinyin: Zhū Xiǎodān)	May 21, 2000 (age 26)	Shanghai	Team SII					N/A	N/A				On hiatus since September 27, 2019; Unofficially resigned on August 30, 2019
Zhao Ye (Chinese: 赵晔; pinyin: Zhào Yè)	August 28, 1995 (age 31)	Jiangsu	Team SII		N/A	N/A	N/A	N/A					On hiatus since December 29, 2018; Unofficially resigned on October 22, 2018
Chen Jiaying (Chinese: 陈佳莹; pinyin: Chén Jiāyíng)	July 12, 1993 (age 33)	Shanghai	Team NII	N/A	N/A	N/A	N/A	N/A	N/A	N/A			On hiatus since September 4, 2020
Chen Wenyan (Chinese: 陈问言; pinyin: Chén Wènyán)	January 27, 1994 (age 32)	Guangzhou, Guangdong	Team NII	N/A	N/A	N/A	N/A	N/A					On hiatus since November 2, 2018; Unofficially resigned on October 22, 2018
Feng Xinduo (Chinese: 冯薪朵; pinyin: Féng Xīnduǒ)	January 24, 1992 (age 34)	Dalian, Liaoning	Team NII	N/A	12	5	4	3	N/A				Concurrent member of BEJ48 Team E from October 18, 2019, to January 22, 2020; On hiatus since June 13, 2020; Unofficially resigned on January 22, 2020
Gong Shiqi (Chinese: 龚诗淇; pinyin: Gōng Shīqí)	May 5, 1998 (age 28)	Chongqing	Team NII	12	18	17	N/A						On hiatus since January 24, 2018; Unofficially resigned on January 18, 2018
Huang Tingting (Chinese: 黄婷婷; pinyin: Huáng Tíngtíng)	September 8, 1992 (age 34)	Nanjing, Jiangsu	Team NII	N/A	4	3	3	2	N/A				On hiatus since December 21, 2019; Unofficially resigned on December 20, 2019
Hao Wanqing (Chinese: 郝婉晴; pinyin: Hǎo Wǎnqíng)	November 1, 1993 (age 32)	Zibo, Shandong	Team NII		30	N/A	51	N/A					On hiatus since October 1, 2018; Unofficially resigned on August 27, 2018
He Xiaoyu (Chinese: 何晓玉; pinyin: Hé Xiǎoyù)	October 31, 1992 (age 33)	Jingzhou, Hubei	Team NII	N/A	N/A	N/A	59	N/A	N/A				On hiatus since June 13, 2020; Unofficially resigned on April 5, 2020
Jing Yingyue (Chinese: 金莹玥; pinyin: Jīn Yíngyuè)	May 27, 1996 (age 30)	Jiangsu	Team NII				N/A	N/A	N/A	45			On hiatus since June 10, 2021; Unofficially resigned on May 5, 2021, held her last event on June 6
Li Meiqi (Chinese: 李美琪; pinyin: Lǐ Měiqí)	May 29, 2001 (age 25)	Jingzhou, Hubei	Team NII					N/A	N/A				On hiatus since September 27, 2019; Unofficially resigned on July 29, 2019
Liu Peixin (Chinese: 刘佩鑫; pinyin: Liú Pèixīn)	January 11, 1996 (age 30)	Huludao, Liaoning	Team NII; Team Ft		27	37	N/A	N/A					On hiatus since October 1, 2018; Unofficially resigned on July 15, 2018, held her last event on September 30, 2018
Ma Fan (Chinese: 马凡; pinyin: Mǎ Fán)	March 20, 1996 (age 30)	Sichuan	Team NII					N/A	N/A				On hiatus since January 10, 2020; Unofficially resigned on January 8, 2020
Tang Anqi (Chinese: 唐安琪; pinyin: Táng Ānqí)	July 21, 1992 (age 34)	Huangshi, Hubei	Team NII	N/A	28	N/A							On hiatus since October 25, 2016
Tao Bo'er (Chinese: 陶波尔; pinyin: Táo Bō'ěr)	June 20, 1998 (age 28)	Chongqing	Team NII				N/A	N/A					On hiatus since December 29, 2018; Unofficially resigned on December 9, 2018
Wang Shimeng (Chinese: 王诗蒙; pinyin: Wáng Shīméng)	February 25, 1995 (age 31)	Luzhou, Sichuan	Team NII				SHY48 2	48	N/A				On hiatus since June 13, 2020; Unofficially resigned on June 30, 2020
Xie Ni (Chinese: 谢妮; pinyin: Xiè Nī)	February 12, 2000 (age 26)	Shanghai	Team NII		N/A	30	60	54	N/A				On hiatus since January 10, 2020; Unofficially resigned on November 17, 2019
Yi Jia'ai (Chinese: 易嘉爱; pinyin: Yì Jiā'ài)	June 7, 1995 (age 31)	Shenzhen, Guangdong	Team NII	14	8	26	39	25	N/A				On hiatus since June 13, 2020; Unofficially resigned on May 4, 2020
Yan Jiaojun (Chinese: 严佼君; pinyin: Yán Jiǎojūn)	April 29, 1995 (age 31)	Xiaogan, Hubei	Team NII			36	30						On hiatus since May 17, 2018; Unofficially resigned on March 31, 2018, held her last event on April 1, 2018
Zhou Ruilin (Chinese: 周睿林; pinyin: Zhōu Ruìlín)	June 1, 2004 (age 22)	Chongqing	Team NII										On hiatus since June 13, 2020
Zhou Yi (Chinese: 周怡; pinyin: Zhōu Yí)	June 13, 1993 (age 33)	Jinhua, Zhejiang	Team NII			N/A	N/A						On hiatus since December 15, 2017; Unofficially resigned on December 8, 2017
Zhang Yi (Chinese: 张怡; pinyin: Zhāng Yí)	June 22, 1994 (age 32)	Hefei, Anhui	Team NII			33	31	31	N/A	47	N/A		On hiatus since November 17, 2021; Unofficially resigned on October 23, 2021, held her last event on the same day
Zhang Yameng (Chinese: 张雅梦; pinyin: Zhāng Yǎmèng)	April 21, 1996 (age 30)	Baoshan, Yunnan	Team NII				N/A						On hiatus since September 9, 2017; Unofficially resigned on July 29, 2017
Zhang Yuxin (Chinese: 张雨鑫; pinyin: Zhāng Yǔxīn)	March 1, 1994 (age 32)	Changsha, Hunan	Team NII		N/A	N/A	20	27	32	32	48	N/A	On hiatus since September 12, 2022; Unofficially resigned on September 12, 2022
Cheng Ge (Chinese: 程戈; pinyin: Chéng Gē)	October 27, 1997 (age 28)	Heilongjiang	Team HII					N/A	N/A	N/A			On hiatus since June 10, 2021; Unofficially resigned on March 13, 2021
Chen Pan (Chinese: 陈盼; pinyin: Chén Pàn)	November 4, 1998 (age 27)	Chongqing	Team HII					N/A	N/A	N/A			On hiatus since October 14, 2020
Lin Nan (Chinese: 林楠; pinyin: Lín Nán)	June 23, 1994 (age 32)	Shantou, Guangdong	Team HII		N/A	N/A	N/A	N/A	N/A	N/A	N/A		On hiatus since August 18, 2021; Unofficially resigned on August 7, 2021
Qi Yuzhu (Chinese: 戚予珠; pinyin: Qī Yǔzhū)	June 19, 1999 (age 27)	Sichuan	Team HII					N/A	N/A				On hiatus since May 20, 2020; Unofficially resigned on April 1, 2020
Song Yushan (Chinese: 宋雨珊; pinyin: Sòng Yǔshān)	June 14, 1999 (age 27)	Henan	Team HII			N/A	N/A	N/A	43	N/A			On hiatus since September 4, 2020; Unofficially resigned on August 17, 2020
Yuan Hang (Chinese: 袁航; pinyin: Yuán Háng)	May 20, 1996 (age 30)	Guizhou	Team HII			N/A	33						On hiatus since May 17, 2018; Unofficially resigned on February 9, 2018
Zeng Xiaowen (Chinese: 曾晓雯; pinyin: Zēng Xiǎowén)	March 25, 1998 (age 28)	Shanwei, Guangdong	Team HII				N/A	N/A					On hiatus since October 1, 2018; Unofficially resigned on September 7, 2018
Feng Xiaofei (Chinese: 冯晓菲; pinyin: Féng Xiǎofēi)	October 17, 1995 (age 30)	Kaifeng, Henan	Team X		N/A	N/A	47	N/A	24	N/A			On hiatus since September 4, 2020; Unofficially resigned on August 18, 2020, held her last event on August 27
Li Jing (Chinese: 李晶; pinyin: Lǐ Jīng)	June 7, 1995 (age 31)	Zhenjiang, Jiangsu	Team X		N/A	N/A	N/A						On hiatus since May 17, 2018; Unofficially resigned on April 22, 2018
Liu Jinghan (Chinese: 刘静晗; pinyin: Liú Jìnghán)	October 4, 1999 (age 26)	Jinzhou, Liaoning	Team X				N/A	N/A					On hiatus since April 30, 2019; Unofficially resigned on May 2, 2019
Lu Jingping (Chinese: 鲁静萍; pinyin: Lǔ Jìngpíng)	June 3, 2002 (age 24)	Yangzhou, Jiangsu	Team X						N/A				On hiatus since May 20, 2020; Unofficially resigned on June 25, 2020
Li Xingyan (Chinese: 李星彦; pinyin: Lǐ Xīngyàn)	March 29, 2000 (age 26)	Shanghai	Team X								N/A		On hiatus since November 19, 2021
Li Xingyu (Chinese: 李星羽; pinyin: Lǐ Xīngyǔ)	February 6, 2000 (age 26)	Shanghai	Team X					N/A	42	N/A			On hiatus since June 10, 2021; Unofficially resigned on April 18, 2021
Lin Yining (Chinese: 林忆宁; pinyin: Lín Yìníng)	July 17, 1997 (age 29)	Shanghai	Team X			N/A	N/A						On hiatus since May 17, 2018; Unofficially resigned on March 29, 2018
Li Zhao (Chinese: 李钊; pinyin: Lǐ Zhāo)	May 23, 1997 (age 29)	Zhangjiajie, Hunan	Team X		N/A	N/A	38	41	N/A	N/A			On hiatus since June 10, 2021; Held her last event on April 29, 2021
Pan Luyao (Chinese: 潘璐瑶; pinyin: Pàn Lùyáo)	July 10, 1999 (age 27)	Shanghai	Team X							N/A	N/A		On hiatus since February 17, 2022; Unofficially resigned on February 17, 2022
Wang Jialing (Chinese: 汪佳翎; pinyin: Wāng Jiālíng)	July 13, 1999 (age 27)	Fuzhou, Fujian	Team X		N/A	N/A	N/A	N/A	40	N/A			On hiatus since September 4, 2020; Unofficially resigned on August 18, 2020, held her last event on August 27
Wang Shu (Chinese: 汪束; pinyin: Wāng Shù)	May 8, 1997 (age 29)	Xuzhou, Jiangsu	Team X		N/A	N/A	41	N/A					On hiatus since October 1, 2018; Unofficially resigned on July 8, 2018, held her last event on July 30, 2018
Yang Ye Chinese: 杨晔; pinyin: Yáng Yè)	March 23, 1997 (age 29)	Hohhot, Inner Mongolia	Team X				BEJ48 13	N/A	BEJ48 16	34			On hiatus since June 10, 2021; Unofficially resigned on June 20, 2021
Yang Yunyu (Chinese: 杨韫玉; pinyin: Yáng Yùnyù)	September 15, 1995 (age 30)	Guiyang, Guizhou	Team X		N/A	24	52	N/A					On hiatus since November 2, 2018; Unofficially resigned on October 13, 2018
Zhang Dansan (Chinese: 张丹三; pinyin: Zhāng Dānsān)	April 28, 1997 (age 29)	Wuhan, Hubei	Team X		N/A	16	53	20	N/A				On hiatus since January 10, 2020; Unofficially resigned on December 21, 2019
Chen Yin (Chinese: 陈音; pinyin: Chén Yīn)	December 5, 1999 (age 26)	Shanghai	Team XII			N/A							Ex-member of Color Girls, replaced by Yang Bingyi; On hiatus since April 18, 2017; Unofficially resigned on April 14, 2017
Wang Xiyuan (Chinese: 王溪源; pinyin: Wáng Xīyuán)	May 16, 1998 (age 28)	Yunnan	Team Ft / Team HII					N/A					On hiatus since December 29, 2018; Unofficially resigned on November 15, 2018
Zhang Xinyue (Chinese: 张馨月; pinyin: Zhāng Xīnyuè)	April 4, 1996 (age 30)	Guang'an, Sichuan	Team Ft										On hiatus since October 1, 2018; Unofficially resigned on August 18, 2018, held her last event on August 24, 2018
Li Yuqian (Chinese: 李玉倩; pinyin: Lǐ Yùqiàn)	May 28, 1997 (age 29)	Anqing, Anhui	Not Assigned					N/A	N/A	N/A			On hiatus since April 3, 2021
Sun Xinwen (Chinese: 孙歆文; pinyin: Sūn Xīnwén)	November 4, 1994 (age 31)	Shanghai	Not Assigned		N/A	N/A	N/A	N/A	N/A	N/A			On hiatus since April 3, 2021
Cheng Jue (Chinese: 成珏; pinyin: Chéng Jué)	January 3, 1996 (age 30)	Shanghai	Trainee			N/A	N/A	N/A					On hiatus since October 1, 2018; Unofficially resigned on November 10, 2018
Deng Xinyue (Chinese: 邓歆玥; pinyin: Dėng Xīnyuè)	April 20, 2005 (age 21)	Chengdu, Sichuan	Trainee										On hiatus since June 10, 2021; Unofficially resigned on June 16, 2021
Hong Peiyun (Chinese: 洪珮雲; pinyin: Hóng Pèiyún)	January 7, 2001 (age 25)	Shanghai	Trainee			31	49	44	N/A	N/A	N/A		On hiatus since October 19, 2021; Unofficially resigned on October 15, 2021
Huang Tongyang (Chinese: 黄彤扬; pinyin: Huáng Tóngyáng)	January 28, 1996 (age 30)	Xiamen, Fujian	Trainee			N/A	N/A						On hiatus since January 19, 2019; Unofficially resigned on September 9, 2018
Li Qingyang (Chinese: 李清扬; pinyin: Lǐ Qīngyáng)	June 16, 1997 (age 29)	Xiangyang, Hubei	Trainee		N/A	N/A	N/A						On hiatus since January 19, 2019; Unofficially resigned on September 8, 2018
Pan Yanqi (Chinese: 潘燕琦; pinyin: Pān Yànqí)	May 25, 1997 (age 29)	Ningbo, Zhejiang	Trainee				N/A						On hiatus since January 19, 2019; Unofficially resigned on January 2, 2019
Shen Zhilin (Chinese: 沈之琳; pinyin: Shěn Zhīlín)	November 26, 1994 (age 31)	Shanghai	Trainee	N/A	N/A	N/A	N/A						On hiatus since January 19, 2019; Unofficially resigned on December 12, 2017
Wang Baishuo (Chinese: 王柏硕; pinyin: Wáng Bǎishuò)	December 12, 1997 (age 28)	Jinan, Shandong	Trainee		N/A	N/A	N/A						On hiatus since January 19, 2019; Unofficially resigned on September 18, 2017
Wu Yanwen (Chinese: 吴燕文; pinyin: Wú Yànwén)	October 18, 1994 (age 31)	Zhengzhou, Henan	Trainee		N/A	N/A	N/A						On hiatus since January 19, 2019; Unofficially resigned on January 5, 2018, held her last event on February 5, 2018
Yao Yichun (Chinese: 姚祎纯; pinyin: Yáo Yīchún)	April 28, 2000 (age 26)	Suzhou, Jiangsu	Trainee				N/A						On hiatus since January 19, 2019; Unofficially resigned on March 21, 2018
Zhang Ranran (Chinese: 张冉冉; pinyin: Zhāng Rǎnrǎn)	February 27, 2000 (age 26)	Xuzhou, Jiangsu	Trainee								N/A		On hiatus since December 15, 2021; Unofficially resigned on August 22, 2021, held her last event on August 29
Zhang Wenjing (Chinese: 张文静; pinyin: Zhāng Wénjìng)	January 14, 1998 (age 28)	Shanghai	Trainee			N/A	N/A						On hiatus since January 19, 2019; Unofficially resigned in February 2018, held her last event on March 2, 2018

== Former members ==
=== Star Palace ===
Name _{(Birth date, birthplace)}	Team	Election rank								Notes
Name _{(Birth date, birthplace)}	Team	1	2	3	4	5	6	7	8	Notes
Ju Jingyi (Chinese: 鞠婧祎; pinyin: Jū Jìngyī) (June 18, 1994 in Suining, Sichuan)	Team NII	4	2	1	1					Elevated to the Star Palace on December 15, 2017
Li Yitong (Chinese: 李艺彤; pinyin: Lǐ Yìtóng) (December 23, 1995 in Xi'an, Shaanxi)	Team HII	6	3	2	2	1	1			Elevated to the Star Palace on September 13, 2019
Sun Rui (Chinese: 孙芮; pinyin: Sūn Ruì) (July 29, 1995 (age 31) in Harbin, Heilongjiang)	Team SII	N/A	N/A	N/A	18	17	13	1	1	Elevated to the Star Palace on September 21, 2021

=== Honorary Graduates ===
Name	Birth date (age)	Birthplace	Team	Election rank								Notes
Name	Birth date (age)	Birthplace	Team	1	2	3	4	5	6	7	8	Notes
Chen Guanhui (Chinese: 陈观慧; pinyin: Chén Guānhuì)	August 28, 1993 (age 33)	Zhanjiang, Guangdong	Team SII	10	22	47	61	N/A	N/A			Graduated on October 14, 2020
Chen Si (Chinese: 陈思; pinyin: Chén Sī)	September 14, 1991 (age 35)	Yueyang, Hunan	Team SII	9	24	38	N/A	N/A	N/A			Graduated on October 14, 2020
Dai Meng (Chinese: 戴萌; pinyin: Dài Méng)	February 8, 1993 (age 33)	Shanghai	Team SII	13	15	12	11	8	9			Graduated on October 14, 2020; Continues activities as an artist signed under Star48
Jiang Yun (Chinese: 蒋芸; pinyin: Jiǎng Yún)	March 27, 1992 (age 34)	Changzhou, Jiangsu	Team SII	N/A	21	N/A	44	62	N/A	23		Graduated on March 27, 2022
Kong Xiaoyin (Chinese: 孔肖吟; pinyin: Kǒng Xiàoyín)	April 11, 1992 (age 34)	Shenyang, Liaoning	Team SII	15	16	25	12	13	6			Graduated on October 14, 2020; Was formerly an artist signed under Star48; Resigned on March 24, 2021
Lin Siyi (Chinese: 林思意; pinyin: Lín Sīyì)	April 5, 1994 (age 32)	Wenzhou, Zhejiang	Team HII	N/A	17	13	14	10	N/A	5	N/A	Graduated on December 4, 2021; Continues activities as an artist signed under Star48
Lu Ting (Chinese: 陆婷; pinyin: Lù Tíng)	December 18, 1992 (age 33)	Shanghai	Team NII	N/A	10	7	5	4	N/A	2		Graduated on September 26, 2021; Continues activities as an artist signed under Star48
Li Yuqi (Chinese: 李宇琪; pinyin: Lǐ Yǔqí)	February 26, 1993 (age 33)	Xi'an, Shaanxi	Team SII	11	7	20	16	40	N/A			Graduated on October 14, 2020
Mo Han (Chinese: 莫寒; pinyin: Mò Hán)	January 7, 1992 (age 34)	Zunyi, Guizhou	Team SII	7	13	6	8	5	2			Graduated on October 14, 2020; Continues activities as an artist signed under Star48
Qian Beiting (Chinese: 钱蓓婷; pinyin: Qián Bèitíng)	May 7, 1995 (age 31)	Shanghai	Team SII	N/A	26	28	26	9	17			Graduated on October 14, 2020; Continues activities as an artist signed under Star48
Qiu Xinyi (Chinese: 邱欣怡; pinyin: Qiū Xīnyí)	January 11, 1997 (age 29)	Taipei, Taiwan	Team SII	2	14	10	N/A	N/A	N/A			Graduated on October 14, 2020
Wu Zhehan (Chinese: 吴哲晗; pinyin: Wú Zhéhán)	August 26, 1995 (age 31)	Jiaxing, Zhejiang	Team SII	1	N/A	23	15	12	5			Graduated on October 14, 2020; Continues activities as an artist signed under Star48
Xu Chenchen (Chinese: 徐晨辰; pinyin: Xú Chénchén)	June 22, 1990 (age 36)	Nanjing, Jiangsu	Team SII	16	N/A	N/A	N/A	N/A	N/A			Graduated on October 14, 2020
Xu Jiaqi (Chinese: 许佳琪; pinyin: Xǔ Jiāqí)	August 27, 1995 (age 31)	Taizhou, Zhejiang	Team SII	8	20	11	10	7	7			Graduated on October 14, 2020; Continues activities as an artist signed under Star48
Zhang Yuge (Chinese: 张语格; pinyin: Zhāng Yǔgé)	May 11, 1996 (age 30)	Harbin, Heilongjiang	Team SII	5	5	8	9	16	4			Graduated on October 14, 2020; Continues activities as an artist signed under Star48
Zhao Yue (Chinese: 赵粤; pinyin: Zhào Yuè)	April 29, 1995 (age 31)	Wuhan, Hubei	Team NII	N/A	11	9	7	6	N/A			Graduated on September 11, 2022; Continues activities as an artist signed under Star48

=== Former official members ===
Name _{(Birth date, birthplace)}	Team	Election rank								Notes
Name _{(Birth date, birthplace)}	Team	1	2	3	4	5	6	7	8	Notes
Jiang Yuxi (Chinese: 蒋羽熙; pinyin: Jiǎng Yǔxī) (February 18, 1996 (age 30) in Shanxi)	No Teams									Graduated on August 18, 2013
Ding Ziyan (Chinese: 丁紫妍; pinyin: Dīng Zǐyán) (October 6, 1995 (age 30) in Anhui)	No Teams									Graduated on October 6, 2013
Wang Yijun (Chinese: 王依君; pinyin: Wáng Yījūn) (June 6, 1995 (age 31) in Jiangsu)	Team NII									Graduated on December 1, 2013
Yang Yaru (Chinese: 杨雅如; pinyin: Yáng Yǎrú) (November 15, 1995 (age 30) in Fujian)	Team NII									Graduated on February 8, 2014
Dong Zhiyi (Chinese: 董芷依; pinyin: Dǒng Zhǐyī) (August 20, 1993 (age 33) in Guizhou)	Team SII									Graduated on April 2, 2014
Gu Xiangjun (Chinese: 顾香君; pinyin: Gù Xiāngjūn) (October 23, 1995 (age 30) in Shanghai)	Team SII									Graduated on April 2, 2014
Tang Min (Chinese: 汤敏; pinyin: Tāng Mǐn) (September 3, 1996 (age 30) in Shanghai)	Team SII									Graduated on April 2, 2014
Hu Siyi (Chinese: 胡思奕; pinyin: Hú Sīyì) (March 3, 1992 (age 34) in Zhejiang)	Team NII									Graduated on April 2, 2014
Lü Siqin (Chinese: 吕思琴; pinyin: Lǚ Sīqín) (November 9, 1994 (age 31) in Zhejiang)	Team NII									Graduated on April 2, 2014
Wang Jialu (Chinese: 王佳路; pinyin: Wáng Jiālù) (March 10, 1996 (age 30) in Zhejiang)	Team NII									Graduated on April 2, 2014
Chen Jiayao (Chinese: 陈嘉瑶; pinyin: Chén Jiāyáo) (July 29, 1995 (age 31) in Guangdong)	Team NII									Graduated on April 25, 2014
Kang Xin (Chinese: 康欣; pinyin: Kāng Xīn) (April 21, 1993 (age 33) in Guangdong)	Team HII									Graduated on October 25, 2014
Zeng Linyu (Chinese: 曾琳瑜; pinyin: Zēng Línyù) (July 16, 1993 (age 33) in Guangzhou, Guangdong)	Team SII									Graduated on November 25, 2014
Zhang Xiyin (Chinese: 张曦尹; pinyin: Zhāng Xīyǐn) (April 23, 1997 (age 29) in Dazhou, Sichuan)	Team HII									Graduated on November 25, 2014
Zhou Qiujun (Chinese: 周秋均; pinyin: Zhōu Qiūjūn) (October 2, 1995 (age 30) in Chongqing)	Team HII									Graduated on November 25, 2014
Han Meng (Chinese: 韩萌; pinyin: Hán Méng) (November 10, 1995 (age 30) in Jiangsu)	Team HII									Graduated on December 25, 2014
Liang Huiwen (Chinese: 梁慧雯; pinyin: Liáng Huìwén) (September 1, 1999 (age 27) in Jiangsu)	Team HII									Graduated on December 25, 2014
Xu Yanyu (Chinese: 徐言雨; pinyin: Xú Yányǔ) (November 10, 1993 (age 32) in Zhejiang)	Team NII	N/A								Graduated on January 8, 2015
Zhou Shuyan (Chinese: 周淑妍; pinyin: Zhōu Shūyán) (March 22, 1996 (age 30) in Guangdong)	Team NII									Graduated on January 8, 2015
Gong Xiaohe (Chinese: 宫小荷; pinyin: Gōng Xiǎohé) (July 11, 1996 (age 30) in Anhui)	Team SII									Graduated on March 17, 2015
Li Xuan (Chinese: 李璇; pinyin: Lǐ Xuán) (June 27, 1995 (age 31) in Sichuan)	Team NII									Graduated on March 17, 2015
Yang Yinyu (Chinese: 杨吟雨; pinyin: Yáng Yínyǔ) (February 10, 1994 (age 32) in Jiangsu)	Team HII									Graduated on March 23, 2015
Sun Jingyi (Chinese: 孙静怡; pinyin: Sūn Jìngyí) (July 8, 1992 (age 34) in Xinjiang)	Team X		N/A							Graduated on October 25, 2015
Zhang Wenze (Chinese: 张闻则; pinyin: Zhāng Wénzé)	Team XII									Graduated on December 4, 2015
Li Doudou (Chinese: 李豆豆; pinyin: Lǐ Dòudòu) (October 5, 1996 (age 29) in Guangxi)	Team HII		29							Graduated on January 6, 2016
Shi Yujie (Chinese: 时语婕; pinyin: Shí Yǔjié) (April 4, 1998 (age 28) in Guangxi)	Team XII									Graduated on February 2, 2016
Sae Miyazawa (Japanese: 宮澤 佐江, romanized: Miyazawa Sae; Chinese: 宫泽佐江; pinyin: Gōngzé Zuǒjiāng) (August 13, 1990 (age 36) in Tokyo)	Team SII	N/A								Graduated on March 16, 2016
Liu Shilei (Chinese: 刘诗蕾; pinyin: Liú Shīlěi) (March 22, 1996 (age 30) in Sichuan)	Team NII									Graduated on March 26, 2016
Cheng Wenlu (Chinese: 程文路; pinyin: Chéng Wénlù) (April 5, 2000 (age 26) in Shanghai)	Team XII									Dismissed on May 16, 2016
Mariya Suzuki (Japanese: 鈴木まりや, romanized: Suzuki Mariya; Chinese: 铃木玛莉亚; pinyin: Língmù Mǎlìyà) (April 29, 1991 (age 35) in Saitama)	Team SII	N/A								Concurrent position with SNH48 removed on June 10, 2016
Liu Liwei (Chinese: 刘力玮; pinyin: Liú Lìwěi) (July 25, 1997 (age 29) in Jiangsu)	Team SII			N/A						Dismissed on August 14, 2016
Shen Yuejiao (Chinese: 申月姣; pinyin: Shēn Yuèjiāo) (September 10, 1996 (age 30) in Henan)	Team SII			N/A						Dismissed on August 14, 2016
Deng Yanqiufei (Chinese: 邓艳秋菲; pinyin: Dèng Yànqiūfēi) (July 30, 1995 (age 31) in Anhui)	Team NII			N/A						Dismissed on August 14, 2016
Qian Yi (Chinese: 钱艺; pinyin: Qián Yì) (June 7, 1998 (age 28) in Jiangsu)	Team NII			N/A						Dismissed on August 14, 2016
Zhang Yunwen (Chinese: 张韵雯; pinyin: Zhāng Yùnwén) (February 26, 1998 (age 28) in Shanghai)	Team X		N/A	N/A						Graduated on October 25, 2016
Wang Lu (Chinese: 王璐; pinyin: Wáng Lù) (May 20, 1996 (age 30) in Henan)	Team HII		N/A	41						On hiatus from December 5, 2016, to June 13, 2017; Graduated on June 13, 2017
Luo Lan (Chinese: 罗兰; pinyin: Luó Lán) (September 16, 1991 (age 34) in Shaanxi)	Team NII	N/A	N/A	N/A						On hiatus from May 19, 2017, to June 16, 2017; Graduated on June 16, 2017
Wen Wen (Chinese: 文文; pinyin: Wén Wén) (May 31, 1995 (age 31) in Chongqing)	Team HII				N/A					Graduated on September 30, 2017
Zhao Mengting (Chinese: 赵梦婷; pinyin: Zhào Mèngtíng) (June 6, 1997 (age 29) in Nanjing, Jiangsu)	Team HII				N/A					Dismissed on September 30, 2017
He Sukun (Chinese: 贺苏堃; pinyin: Hè Sūkūn) (November 14, 1995 in Hebei)	Team XII									Dismissed on September 30, 2017; Committed suicide on November 27, 2019
Xu Jiayi (Chinese: 许嘉怡; pinyin: Xǔ Jiāyí) (September 27, 1999 (age 26) in Zhejiang)	Team XII									Graduated on December 1, 2017
Chen Yixin (Chinese: 陈怡馨; pinyin: Chén Yíxīn) (September 17, 1996 (age 29) in Fujian)	Team HII		N/A	42						Graduated on June 29, 2018; On hiatus from December 13, 2016, to June 29, 2018; Unofficially resigned on December 3, 2016
Dong Yanyun (Chinese: 董艳芸; pinyin: Dǒng Yànyún) (February 24, 1993 (age 33) in Quanzhou, Fujian)	Team NII	N/A	N/A							Graduated on January 19, 2019; On hiatus from July 30, 2016, to January 19, 2019; Was forbidden from returning to the team, officially resigned in July 2017
Guo Qianyun (Chinese: 郭倩芸; pinyin: Guō Qiànyún) (April 4, 1997 (age 29) in Jiangsu)	Team NII				N/A	N/A				Graduated on January 19, 2019; On hiatus from October 1, 2018, to January 19, 2019; Unofficially resigned on August 24, 2018, held her last event on September 1
Ge Jiahui (Chinese: 葛佳慧; pinyin: Gě Jiāhuì) (August 1, 1995 (age 31) in Nanjing, Jiangsu)	Team NII									Graduated on January 19, 2019; On hiatus from November 6, 2017, to January 19, 2019; Unofficially resigned on November 5, 2017
Liu Juzi (Chinese: 刘菊子; pinyin: Liú Júzǐ) (December 12, 1998 (age 27) in Wuhan, Hubei)	Team NII				N/A	N/A				Graduated on January 19, 2019; On hiatus from October 1, 2018, to January 19, 2019; Unofficially resigned on September 15, 2018
Meng Yue (Chinese: 孟玥; pinyin: Mèng Yuè) (June 13, 1994 (age 32) in Changchun, Jilin)	Team NII	N/A	32							Graduated on January 19, 2019; On hiatus from July 30, 2016, to January 19, 2019; Unofficially resigned on March 2, 2016
Xu Zhen (Chinese: 徐真; pinyin: Xú Zhēn) (March 23, 2001 (age 25) in Shanghai)	Team NII									Graduated on January 19, 2019; On hiatus from May 19, 2017, to January 19, 2019; Unofficially resigned on May 18, 2017
Jiang Han (Chinese: 姜涵; pinyin: Jiāng Hán) (November 24, 1997 (age 28) in Shanghai)	Team HII									Graduated on January 19, 2019; On hiatus from February 3, 2018, to January 19, 2019; Unofficially resigned on December 3, 2017
Xu Han (Chinese: 徐晗; pinyin: Xú Hán) (January 15, 1993 (age 33) in Yibin, Sichuan)	Team HII		31	N/A	N/A	N/A	N/A			Graduated on December 21, 2019; Unofficially resigned on June 2, 2019
Zeng Yanfen (Chinese: 曾艳芬; pinyin: Zēng Yànfēn) (January 30, 1991 (age 35) in Shaoguan, Guangdong)	Team NII	N/A	9	4	6					Graduated on May 20, 2020; On hiatus from January 24, 2018, to May 20, 2020; Unofficially resigned on November 14, 2017; Held her last event on January 18, 2018
Luan Jiayi (Chinese: 栾嘉仪; pinyin: Luán Jiāyí) (November 26, 2003 (age 22) in Beijing)	Team NII						N/A			Graduated on October 14, 2020; On hiatus from September 27, 2019, to October 14, 2020; Unofficially resigned on May 27, 2019, held her last event on July 22, 2019
Zhao Hanqian (Chinese: 赵韩倩; pinyin: Zhào Hánqiàn) (July 13, 2000 (age 26) in Zhejiang)	Team SII				N/A					Graduated on June 24, 2021; On hiatus from September 9, 2017, to June 24, 2021; Unofficially resigned on August 21, 2017
Yuan Yuzhen (Chinese: 袁雨桢; pinyin: Yuán Yǔzhēn) (January 10, 1998 (age 28) in Changde, Hunan)	Team SII	N/A	N/A	29	64	63	N/A	N/A	N/A	Resigned on September 7, 2021
Zou Jiajia (Chinese: 邹佳佳; pinyin: Zōu Jiājiā) (October 28, 1998 (age 27) in Sichuan)	Team XII			N/A						Resigned on September 8, 2021; On hiatus from May 19, 2017, to September 8, 2021; Unofficially resigned on May 19, 2017
Qu Chenyu (Chinese: 曲晨语; pinyin: Qū Chényǔ) (November 19, 2006 (age 19) in Shanghai)	Team X								N/A	Resigned on September 14, 2021
Wen Jingjie (Chinese: 温晶婕; pinyin: Wēn Jīngjié) (March 15, 1997 (age 29) in Sichuan)	Team SII	N/A	N/A	N/A	N/A	N/A	N/A	N/A	N/A	Resigned on September 17, 2021
Wan Lina (Chinese: 万丽娜; pinyin: Wàn Lìnà) (October 2, 1997 (age 28) in Jiujiang, Jiangxi)	Team HII	N/A	6	14	17	26	N/A	N/A	N/A	Resigned on October 12, 2021
Qi Jing (Chinese: 祁静; pinyin: Qí Jìng) (July 19, 1998 (age 28) in Shanghai)	Team X				N/A	64	N/A	N/A	24	Resigned on July 2, 2022; On hiatus from June 22, 2022 to July 2, 2022

=== Transferred members ===
==== Transferred to BEJ48 ====
Name	Birth date (age)	Transferred from	Election rank							
Name	Birth date (age)	Transferred from	1	2	3	4	5	6	7	8
Chen Meijun (Chinese: 陈美君; pinyin: Chén Měijūn)	January 15, 1994 (age 32)	Team XII			N/A	N/A	43	N/A		
Feng Xueying (Chinese: 冯雪莹; pinyin: Féng Xuěyíng)	March 13, 1994 (age 32)	Team XII			N/A					
Song Sixian (Chinese: 宋思娴; pinyin: Sòng Sīxián)	October 9, 1997 (age 28)	Team XII			N/A	N/A				
Xiong Sujun (Chinese: 熊素君; pinyin: Xióng Sùjūn)	September 9, 1994 (age 32)	Team XII			N/A	N/A	N/A	BEJ48 11		
Xu Jiali (Chinese: 徐佳丽; pinyin: Xú Jiālì)	September 21, 1996 (age 29)	Team SII			N/A					
Zhang Hanxiao (Chinese: 张菡筱; pinyin: Zhāng Hànxiǎo)	June 26, 1996 (age 30)	Team XII			N/A					

==== Transferred to GNZ48 ====
Name	Birth/death date (age)	Transferred from	Election rank							
Name	Birth/death date (age)	Transferred from	1	2	3	4	5	6	7	8
Chen Ke (Chinese: 陈珂; pinyin: Chén Kē)	August 9, 1995 (age 31)	Team XII			N/A	58	34	10	17	14
Chen Yuqi (Chinese: 陈雨琪; pinyin: Chén Yǔqí)	December 16, 2000 (age 25)	Team XII			N/A	GNZ48 14	N/A			
Du Yuwei (Chinese: 杜雨微; pinyin: Dù Yǔwēi)	March 17, 1999 (age 27) - October 16, 2018 (aged 19)	Team XII			N/A	N/A				
Gao Yuanjing (Chinese: 高源婧; pinyin: Gāo Yuánjìng)	July 6, 1999 (age 27)	Team XII			GNZ48 5	N/A	58	N/A		
Lin Jiapei (Chinese: 林嘉佩; pinyin: Lín Jiāpèi)	August 16, 1998 (age 28)	Team XII			N/A	N/A	N/A	N/A	N/A	N/A
Liu Mengya (Chinese: 刘梦雅; pinyin: Liú Mèngyǎ)	March 24, 1997 (age 29)	Team XII			N/A	N/A				
Li Qinjie (Chinese: 李沁洁; pinyin: Lǐ Qìnjié)	February 12, 1999 (age 27)	Team XII			GNZ48 6	N/A	N/A			
Liu Xiaoxiao (Chinese: 刘筱筱; pinyin: Liú Xiǎoxiǎo)	November 1, 2000 (age 25)	Team XII			N/A	N/A				
Xie Leilei (Chinese: 谢蕾蕾; pinyin: Xiè Lěilěi)	December 1, 1998 (age 27)	Team XII			40	32	11	23	16	N/A
Yang Qingying (Chinese: 阳青颖; pinyin: Yáng Qīngyǐng)	August 27, 2001 (age 25)	Team XII			N/A	N/A	N/A	N/A	N/A	N/A
Zeng Aijia (Chinese: 曾艾佳; pinyin: Zēng Àijiā)	July 11, 1995 (age 31)	Team XII			N/A	N/A	N/A	37	27	19
Zhang Kaiqi (Chinese: 张凯祺; pinyin: Zhāng Kǎiqí)	November 2, 1998 (age 27)	Team XII			N/A	N/A				

==== Transferred to SHY48 ====
Name	Birth date (age)	Transferred from	Election rank							
Name	Birth date (age)	Transferred from	1	2	3	4	5	6	7	8
Wang Jinming (Chinese: 王金铭; pinyin: Wáng Jīnmíng)	July 18, 1996 (age 30)	Team HII			N/A	N/A				

==== Transferred to CKG48 ====
Name	Birth date (age)	Transferred from	Election rank							
Name	Birth date (age)	Transferred from	1	2	3	4	5	6	7	8
Wang Lujiao (Chinese: 王露皎; pinyin: Wáng Lùjiǎo)	February 17, 1995 (age 31)	Team HII			N/A	N/A	N/A			
Liu Jiongran (Chinese: 刘炅然; pinyin: Liú Jiǒngrán)	September 2, 1994 (age 32)	Team HII		25	15	24	N/A			

==== Transferred to IDOLS Ft ====
Name	Birth date (age)	Transferred from	Election rank							
Name	Birth date (age)	Transferred from	1	2	3	4	5	6	7	8
Chen Yunling (Chinese: 陈韫凌; pinyin: Chén Yùnlíng)	December 13, 1997 (age 28)	Team X			N/A	N/A	N/A			
Xiong Qinxian (Chinese: 熊沁娴; pinyin: Xióng Qìnxián)	August 7, 1999 (age 27)	Team HII / Team Ft					N/A			
Xu Yi (Chinese: 许逸; pinyin: Xǔ Yì)	October 7, 1995 (age 30)	Team NII				N/A				
Xu Yiren (Chinese: 徐伊人; pinyin: Xú Yīrén)	February 20, 1996 (age 30)	Team SII		N/A	N/A	N/A	N/A			
Yang Huiting (Chinese: 杨惠婷; pinyin: Yáng Huìtíng)	April 8, 1998 (age 28)	Team HII		N/A	34	48	N/A			
Yu Jiayi (Chinese: 於佳怡; pinyin: Yū Jiāyí)	October 29, 1998 (age 27)	Team HII			46	28	N/A			
Yang Meiqi (Chinese: 杨美琪; pinyin: Yáng Měiqí)	August 12, 1999 (age 27)	Team Ft					N/A			
Zhang Minqi (Chinese: 张敏淇; pinyin: Zhāng Mǐnqí)	December 17, 2000 (age 25)	Team Ft								
Jiang Xin (Chinese: 江鑫; pinyin: Jiāng Xīn)	January 18, 2003 (age 23)	Team HII							N/A	

=== Former understudies ===
- Hu Meiting (Chinese: 胡美婷; pinyin: Hú Měitíng) (May 15, 1993 (age 33) in Jiangsu) Left on December 21, 2012.
- Yu Ting'er (Chinese: 雨婷儿; pinyin: Yǔ Tíng'ér) (January 28, 2000 (age 26) in Beijing) Left on December 21, 2012.
- He Yichen (Chinese: 何轶琛; pinyin: Hé Yìchēn) (January 7, 1990 (age 36) in Jiangsu) Left on May 2, 2013.
- Wang Feisi (Chinese: 王费澌; pinyin: Wáng Fèisī) (September 18, 1994 (age 31) in Beijing) Left on May 3, 2013.
- Chen Li (Chinese: 陈丽; pinyin: Chén Lì) (December 22, 1994 (age 31) in Shanghai) Left on August 18, 2013.
- Zeng Yujia (Chinese: 曾誉嘉; pinyin: Zēng Yùjiā) (March 21, 1995 (age 31) in Sichuan) Left on August 18, 2013.
- Zhang Xinfang (Chinese: 张馨方; pinyin: Zhāng Xīnfāng) (October 25, 1993 (age 32) in Hubei) Left on August 18, 2013.
- Yu Huiwen (Chinese: 俞慧文; pinyin: Yú Huìwén) (July 5, 1990 (age 36) in Jiangsu) Left on August 18, 2013.
- Wang Yiwen (Chinese: 王奕雯; pinyin: Wáng Yìwén) Rejected from selection on September 5, 2013.
- Xu Tong (Chinese: 徐彤; pinyin: Xú Tóng) Rejected from selection on September 5, 2013.
- Zhang Yuwen (Chinese: 张瑜纹; pinyin: Zhāng Yúwén) Rejected from selection on September 5, 2013.
- Yang Haijin (Chinese: 杨海赆; pinyin: Yáng Hǎijìn) (June 6, 1996 (age 30) in Shanghai) Left on November 6, 2013.
- Li Yiwen (Chinese: 李怡文; pinyin: Lǐ Yíwén) (April 28, 1997 (age 29) in Shanghai) Left on September 5, 2014.
- Zhang Jin (Chinese: 张瑾; pinyin: Zhāng Jǐn) (July 23, 1998 (age 28) in Shanghai) Left on April 4, 2015.
- Ai Yaxuan (Chinese: 艾雅萱; pinyin: Ài Yǎxuān) Rejected from selection on December 4, 2015.
- Wu Xian (Chinese: 吴限; pinyin: Wú Xiàn) Rejected from selection on December 4, 2015.
- Yang Tianyi (Chinese: 杨天懿; pinyin: Yáng Tiānyì) Rejected from selection on December 4, 2015.
- Ye Wanyi (Chinese: 叶万仪; pinyin: Yè Wànyí) Rejected from selection on December 4, 2015.
- Zhao Yunhui (Chinese: 赵芸辉; pinyin: Zhào Yúnhuī) Rejected from selection on December 4, 2015.
- Peng Yuhan (Chinese: 彭榆涵; pinyin: Péng Yúhán) (January 18, 2003 (age 23) in Hunan) Transferred to CKG48 on September 1, 2018.
- Li Hailin (Chinese: 李海淋; pinyin: Lǐ Hǎilín) (November 30 in Sichuan) Transferred to BEJ48 on November 8, 2018.
- Lu Jinghua (Chinese: 陆婧华; pinyin: Lù Jìnghuá) Participant of the Unmask Plan, profile deleted on January 19, 2019.
- Lv Mengying (Chinese: 吕梦莹; pinyin: Lǚ Mèngyíng) (July 28, 2000 (age 26) in Shanghai) Graduated on January 19, 2019, unofficially resigned on February 15, 2018, held her last event on March 2.
- Lin Xinyuan (Chinese: 林歆源; pinyin: Lín Xīnyuán) (June 2, 1999 (age 27) in Taizhou, Zhejiang) Graduated on January 19, 2019, unofficially resigned on February 3, 2018, held her last event on March 2.
- Sun Yaping (Chinese: 孙亚萍; pinyin: Sūn Yàpíng) (July 6, 1999 (age 27) in Hefei, Anhui) Graduated on January 19, 2019, unofficially resigned on March 24, 2018.
- Liu Ying (Chinese: 刘瀛; pinyin: Liú Yíng) (February 8, 1999 (age 27) in Suizhou, Hubei) graduated on January 10, 2020, unofficially resigned on October 20, 2018.
