= CKG =

CKG may refer to:

- Chongqing Jiangbei International Airport
- CKG48
