= Balala the Fairies: The Movie =

Balala the Fairies
- Based on: Balala the Fairies by Cai Dongqing
- Starring: Daisy Cakes; Zhao Jinmai; Diamond
- Production companies: Mr. Cartoon Pictures; Alpha Animation; Bona Film Group
- Distributed by: Mr. Cartoon Pictures
- Release date: January 31, 2013 (China)
- Running time: 85 minutes
- Country: China
- Language: Mandarin
- Box office: $7.6 million

Balala the Fairies: the Movie (Chinese: 巴啦啦小魔仙大电影; pinyin: Balālā xiǎo móxian dà diànyǐng) is a 2013 Chinese adventure film produced by Guangdong Alpha Animation, and Culture Co., Ltd. It is a live-action film adaptation of Balala the Fairies, an animated magical girl series of the same name created by Guangzhou toy company Alpha Group Co., Ltd. It was followed by 2014's Balala the Fairies: The Magic Trial and 2015's Balala the Fairies: Princess Camellia.

== Plot ==
At stargazing camp with friends, sisters Michelle (美雪, Meixue) and Maggie (美琪, Meiqi) see the meteorites crashing on to Earth. When the two sisters go to check it out, they find a strange but pretty looking stone and a badly wounded bird. They take the bird home to look after it and end up finding Shirley (小蓝, Xiaolan), back from Fairy Castle. They must complete a new mission: retrieve the Star Key.
