= Sacred Heart High School (Hyderabad) =

- South Lalaguda, Tarnaka, Hyderabad, Telangana 500017; India

Information
- Type: High School
- Established: 1983

Sacred Heart High School is a missionary school located in the Indian city of Hyderabad. The school was established in 1983 and currently teaches students from preschool up until tenth grade.

== 2017 caning incident ==
In November 2017, a teacher at Sacred Heart High School was arrested for brutally beating a student with a cane. The student was five years old and in Upper Kindergarten. According to the police, the student in question reportedly had a fight with one of his classmates and ended up biting him. The teacher then punished the student by beating him with a stick.

Child rights organization Balala Hakkula Sangham demanded that the school be closed and strict action taken against the school's administration.

== Sports ==
Sacred Heart High School has an outdoor sports program with an established cricket team. The school's cricket team was part of the elite group during the 2017-2018 Hyderabad Cricket Association inter-school league championship.
