= SNH48 Group =

Series of Chinese idol group

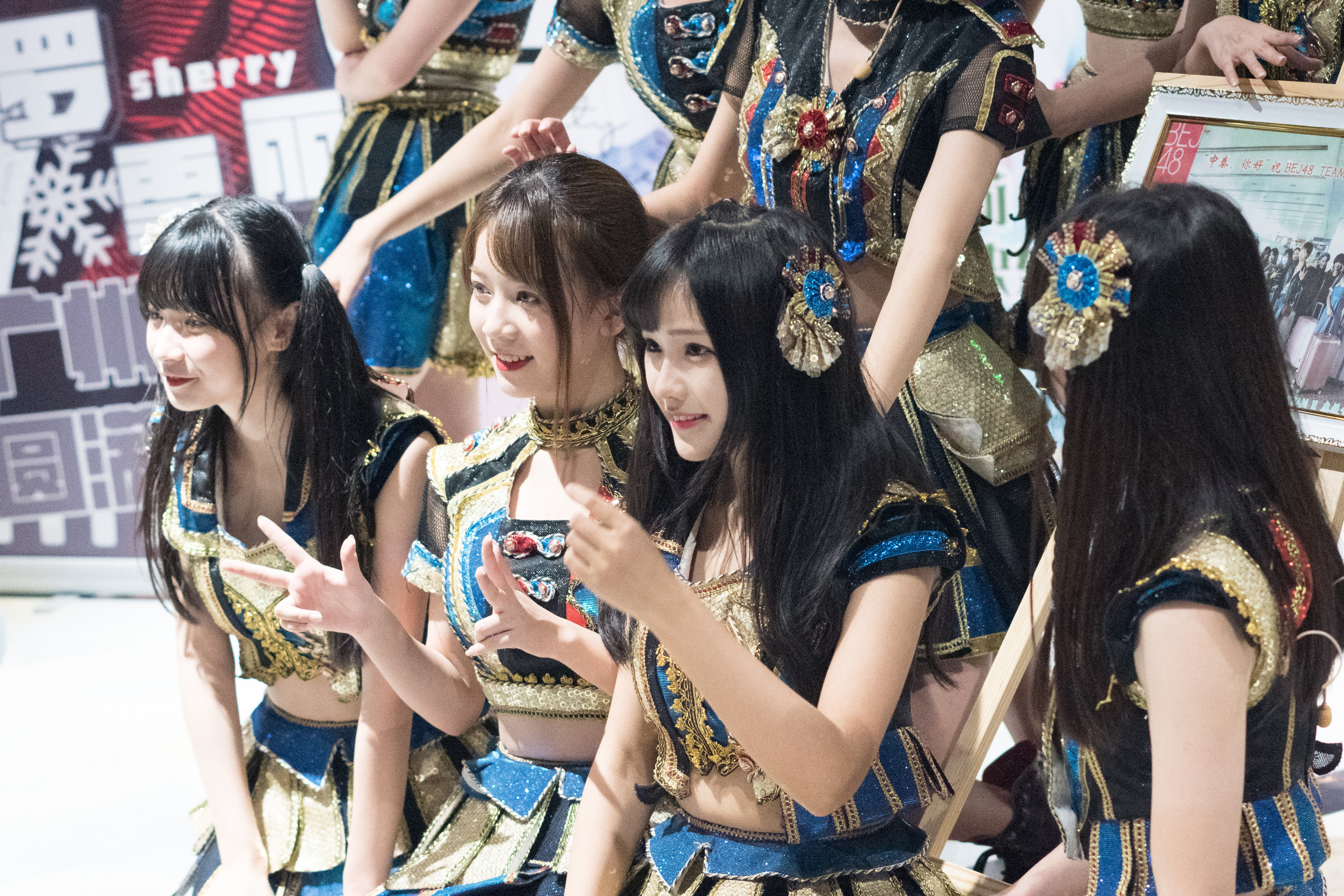
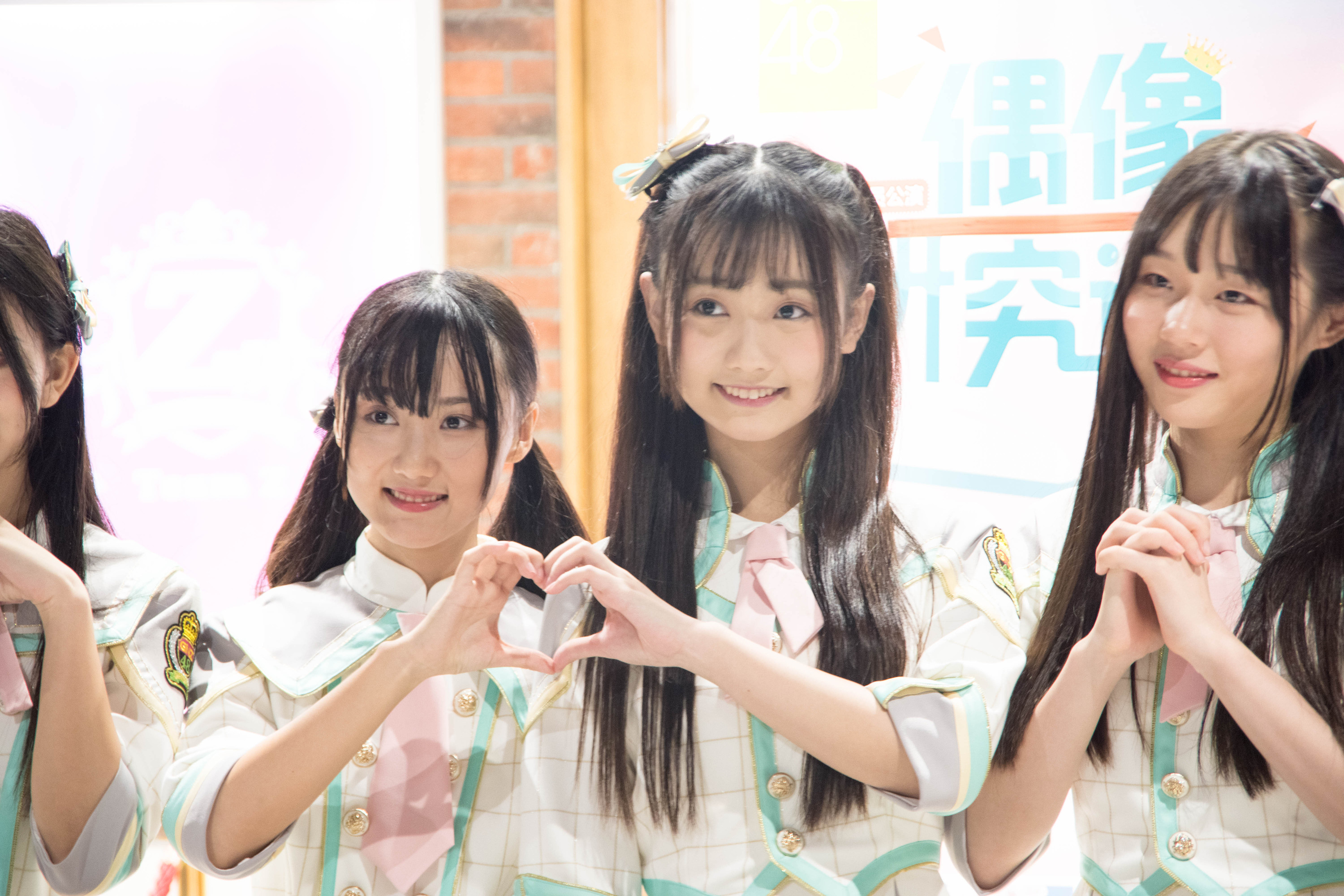
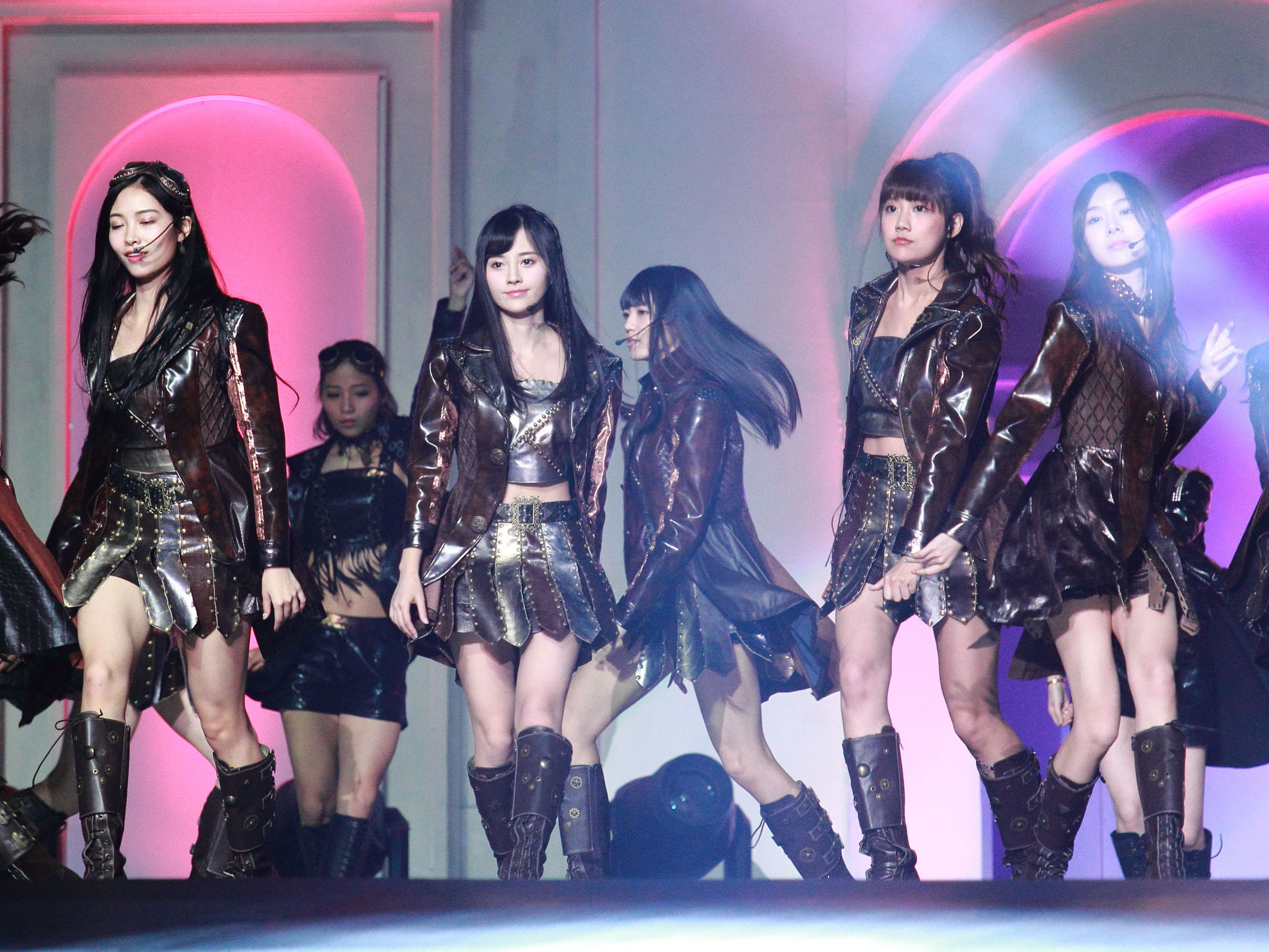
- Top left: BEJ48 in Beijing; Top right: GNZ48 in Guangzhou; Bottom: SNH48 in Shanghai

Background information
- Origin: China; Shanghai (3); Beijing (1); Guangzhou (1); Shenyang (former 1); Chongqing (1); Chengdu (1)
- Genres: C-pop; Electronica; Dance; R&B; Teen pop; Bubblegum Pop
- Years active: 2016–present
- Label: STAR48
- Members: Current groups
- Past members: Former groups
- Website: snh48.com

SNH48 Group (Chinese: SNH48集团; pinyin: SNH48 jítuán) refers to the sister groups of the Chinese girl group SNH48. Based on AKB48's "idols you can meet" concept, it currently consists of 5 sister groups in locations across mainland China. Sister groups not only release their own songs and perform on their own theaters, but also perform on some of the SNH48 singles and events. They also send participants in the SNH48 annual events, such as the general election.

== History ==
On 20 April 2016, Star48 held a press conference in Beijing and announced the plan to launch a series of sister groups across the country. The plan started with BEJ48 and GNZ48, based in Beijing and Guangzhou respectively. On 6 June 2016, AKB48 announced it had suspended its partnership with SNH48 due to the latter's contract violations. On their following statement, SNH48 declared that it had been completely independent from AKB48 from the beginning and SNH48 management had never made any form of partnership with AKS. This marks SNH48's departure from the AKB48 group.

During SNH48's annual general election in July 2016, Star48 announced the formation of SHY48 based in Shenyang. The group held their first performance in the newly opened SHY48 theater on 12 January 2017. Expanding its branch, Star48 also announced the formation of SNH48's first brother group, N2M (Nuclear 2 Mars), during SNH48's annual "Request Time" concert on 7 January 2017. The group changed its name into D7B or DSB (Double 7 Boys) in 2018.

The fourth sister group to SNH48, CKG48 in Chongqing, was announced on 2 June 2017. A joint-audition was soon held for SNH48's 9th generation, as well as BEJ48, GNZ48, and SHY48's 4th generation, and the first generation of CKG48. The group held their first performance in the CKG48 theater on 27 October 2017. A plan to launch the fifth sister group, CGT48 based in Chengdu, was announced on 25 September 2017.

Following low attendances, SHY48 and CKG48 closed their Star Dream theaters in December 2018. The groups officially end their journey in SNH48's annual "Request Time" concert on 19 January 2019, as all their teams were disbanded and the current members were transferred to either SNH48, BEJ48, GNZ48, or the newly-formed IDOLS Ft, an online-based idol group in which the members can develop the opportunity to be transferred to other groups. IDOLS Ft also include less-popular members from SNH48, BEJ48, and GNZ48. However, on 16 March, former staff of CKG48 announced the rebirth of the group. The reformed CKG48 includes members from IDOLS Ft. and begins performing in different temporary theaters. Following this reformation, CKG48 wasn't acknowledge as a part of SNH48 group until 2021.

On 2 January 2020, Star48 announced JNR48 (Junior48), a collaboration with their long-time partner Shanghai Xiaoyuan Art, and includes members between the ages of 6 and 14 who love to sing, dance, and perform with the opportunity to start a career in SNH48 in the future years. On 6 June 2020, the 1st Generation or JNR48 was announced.

As a result of the COVID-19 pandemic in Beijing, BEJ48 officially closed its Star Dream theater in September 2020 and transferred almost all its members to either IDOLS Ft., SNH48, or GNZ48. In November 2020, the remaining members of the group begin to perform in a new theater, the One Club theater. Starting from October 2022, BEJ48 moved to a new venue in We Show Live theater for their performances.

On 25 February 2023, the project to launch CGT48 has officially begun. The group opened their Star Dream theater in June 2023. Along with the group's debut performance, it was also announced that CKG48 will be changing its logo and open their new Star Dream theater. The new CKG48 Star Dream theater opened on 26 August 2023.

During the SIBA Family Concert in August 2023, Star48 announced their plan to launch sister groups in overseas countries including South Korea, Hong Kong, Indonesia, and Malaysia.

== Current groups ==
List of active SNH48 sister groups
Group name	Band color	Years active	Teams (if split)	Location	Notes
SNH48	Light Blue	2013–present	Team SII, Team NII, Team HII, Team X, Team LXS, Trainee	Shanghai, China	The main group
BEJ48	Pink	2016–present	Promoted members, Trainee	Beijing, China	First sister group
GNZ48	Apple Green	2016–present	Team G, Team NIII, Team Z, Trainee	Guangzhou, China	First sister group
CKG48	Brown	2017–2019, 2019 (reborn)–present	Team C, Team K, Trainee	Chongqing, China	Disbanded but was later revived
IDOLS Ft	White – Gold	2019–present		Shanghai, China	Unpromoted members of SNH48 Group
JNR48	Blue	2020–present	Trainee	Shanghai, China	
CGT48	Red	2023–present	Team CII, Team GII	Chengdu, China	

== Former groups ==
List of inactive SNH48 sister groups
Group name	Band color	Years active	Teams (if split)	Location	Notes
SHY48	Violet	2017–2019	Team Slll, Team Hlll, Trainee	Shenyang, China	Disbanded

== Distribution Map ==
=== SNH48 Distribution map ===
Geographic distribution of sister groups of SNH48 inside China

== See also ==
- List of SNH48 members
- Sakamichi Series
- AKB48 Group
