= Balala the Fairies: The Magic Trial =

- Theatrical release poster showing Daisy Cakes as Mei-Xue
- Directed by: Ren Yu; Hao Lui
- Starring: Daisy Cakes; Zhao Jinmai; Chen Yuwei; Wang Hui
- Production companies: Enlight Media; Alpha Animation
- Distributed by: Enlight Pictures
- Release date: January 23, 2014 (China)
- Running time: 90 minutes
- Country: China
- Language: Mandarin
- Box office: US$2.03 million (China)

Balala the Fairies: The Magic Trial (Chinese: 巴啦啦小魔仙之魔法的考驗) is a 2014 Chinese children's fantasy adventure film directed by Ren Yu and Hao Lui. It was released in China on 23 January. It is a live-action film adaptation of an animated magical girl series of the same name created by Guangzhou toy company Alpha Group Co.. It is the second film in the Balala the Fairies film series, following 2013's Balala the Fairies: the Movie and was followed by 2015's Balala the Fairies: Princess Camellia.

== Cast ==
- Daisy Cakes as Mei-Xue
- Zhao Jinmai as Ling Mei Qi / Maggie
- Chen Yuwei
- Wang Hui

== Reception ==
The film has grossed US$2.03 million at the Chinese box office.

== See also ==
- Balala the Fairies
