= Daisy Waite =

- Born: Daisy Liu Waite; 9 September 2005 (age 19); Reading, Berkshire, England
- Occupation(s): Actress, model, presenter
- Years active: 2007–present

Chinese name
- Simplified Chinese: 刘黛希
Transcriptions
Standard Mandarin
- Hanyu Pinyin: Liu Daixi
- Musical career
- Also known as: Xixi

Daisy Liu Waite (born 9 September 2005) is an English-Chinese actress, model and presenter. She is best known for portraying Mei-Xue, in the Chinese 2014 adventure film Balala the Fairies: The Magic Trial. On TV she is known for presenting a regular feature on the Hunan Broadcasting System show Playing Tricks (玩名堂), broadcast nationally on the Aniworld Satellite TV channel. Daisy has also modeled for large brands such as ANTA Sports. Daisy was born in Reading, Berkshire, England but has resided in Changsha, Hunan since she was 3 years old.

== Filmography ==
=== Film ===
Year	Title	Role
2014	Balala the Fairies: The Magic Trial 巴啦啦小魔仙之魔法的考驗	Mei-Xue 美雪
2014	The Boundary. 全城通缉	Young Shao Yu
2015	Balala the Fairies: Princess Camellia 巴啦啦小魔仙之魔箭公主	

=== Television ===
Year	Title	Role	Notes
2012	Playing Tricks 红高梁	Herself	103 Episodes
2015	Balala The Fairies: The Mystery Note 巴啦啦小魔仙音符之谜	Mei-Xue 美雪	52 Episodes
