= Veera Ballala =

Veera Ballala is the name of multiple South Indian kings of the Hoysala Empire:

- Veera Ballala I 1102 - 1108 CE
- Veera Ballala II 1173-1220 CE
- Veera Ballala III 1291-1343 CE

== See also ==
- Veera (disambiguation)
- Balala (disambiguation)
- Vallal, a 1997 Indian film
- Ballala Sena, founder of the Sena dynasty of Bengal in medieval India
- Bhallaladeva, fictional character in the Indian Baahubali media franchise
