= 7Senses =

Chinese girl group

- Origin: Shanghai, China
- Genres: Pop; Mandopop; Chinese music
- Years active: 2017-2025 (inactive)
- Labels: Star48 Culture Media; Ocean Butterflies International; Ninestyle Model Agency; Ninestyle Music; Shanghai Siba Culture & Media Co. Ltd.
- Spinoff of: SNH48
- Members: Akira; Diamond; Eliwa; Kiki; Lynn
- Past members: Bee; Tako
- Website: www.7sensesgirls.com

7Senses (in Chinese: 国际小分队, often stylized as Sen7es, 7SENSES or SEN7ES) is a sub-unit of the Chinese girl group SNH48 and its first global unit.

7Senses debuted on the 24th ERC Chinese Top Ten Awards on March 27, 2017 in Shanghai, China with the song "Girl Crush" and their debut showcase on April 7, 2017 at the Mixing Room, Shanghai. 7Senses is currently made up of 5 members: Zhao Yue (Akira), Dai Meng (Diamond), Xu-Yang Yuzhuo (Eliwa), Xu Jiaqi (Kiki), Chen Lin (Lynn), with two former members Kong Xiaoyin (Bee) and Zhang Yuge (Tako). They were trained by an international team of professionals, including special training in South Korea along with other K-pop trainees, absorbing and learning from the Korean idol system. The number 7 stands for perfection, luck and infinite possibilities on stage.

After their debut in 2017, 7Senses gained popularity outside of mainland China. They started their first reality show/documentary titled "Lucky Seven Baby" on May 2, 2017. The second season released on December 18, 2017. Season three was released on December 20, 2018 and the fourth season was released on November 8, 2019.

== Members ==
=== Current members ===
Name	Chinese name	Nickname
Zhao Yue	赵粤	Akira
Dai Meng	戴萌	Diamond
Xuyang Yuzhuo	许杨玉琢	Eliwa
Xu Jiaqi	许佳琪	Kiki
Chen Lin	陈琳	Lynn

=== Former members ===
Name	Chinese name	Nickname
Kong Xiaoyin	孔肖吟	Bee
Zhang Yuge	张语格	Tako

== Discography ==
=== EPs ===
Title	Album details
Seven Sen7es	Released: April 7, 2017; Label: Star 48 Culture Media, Ocean Butterflies International; Format: CD, digital download; Track listing: 1. 7Senses (第七感); 2. Girl Crush (觉醒); 3. Bee With U (在你身边); 4. Moonlight (月光); 5. Heart Beat (心跳)
Chapter: Blooming	Released: November 20, 2017; Label: Star 48 Culture Media, Ocean Butterflies International; Format: CD, digital download; Track listing: 1. 我只在乎你 (Wo Shi Zaihu Ni); 2. Like a Diamond (闪耀); 3. Kiki's Secret (秘密); 4. I Wanna Play; 5. Lollipop (棒棒糖)
Swan (天鵝)	Released: December 12, 2018; Label: Star 48 Culture Media, Ocean Butterflies International; Format: CD, digital download; Track listing: 1. Swan (天鵝); 2. 7 ‘O’ CLOCK (七点整); 3. OMG (偶买噶); 4. China Town (唐人街); 5. 第七感（7SENSES）REMIX
New Plan	Released: November 4, 2019; Label: Star 48 Culture Media, Ocean Butterflies International; Format: CD, digital download; Track listing: 1. New Plan (Look at Me); 2. Who Is Your Girl; 3. New Plan (Look at Me) (Korean ver.); 4. Who Is Your Girl (Japanese ver.)
The Shadows	Released: August 19, 2020; Label: Star 48 Culture Media, Ocean Butterflies International; Format: CD, digital download; Track listing: 1. U Know; 2. Sandglass (沙漏); 3. The Shadows; 4. We Are (Special ver.); 5. Who Is Your Girl (Acoustic ver.)

=== Singles ===
Title	Release date	EP
"Girl Crush"	2017.04.07	Seven Sen7es
"7Senses"	2017.04.07	Seven Sen7es
"Like a Diamond"	2017.11.20	Chapter: Blooming
"Swan"	2018.12.21	Swan

== Videography ==
Year	Title	Director(s)
2017
2017	"7SENSES"	ZanyBros
2017	"Girl Crush"	ZanyBros
2017	"Like a Diamond"	Unknown
2018	"Kiki's Secret"	Unknown
2018	"Moonlight"	Unknown

== Awards and nominations ==
Year	Award	Category	Nominated Work	Result
2017	2nd Asia Artist Awards	Best Star Award		Won
2018	2nd Soribada Best K-Music Awards	Global Entertainer Award		Won
