= Dai Meng =

Chinese idol singer (born 1993)

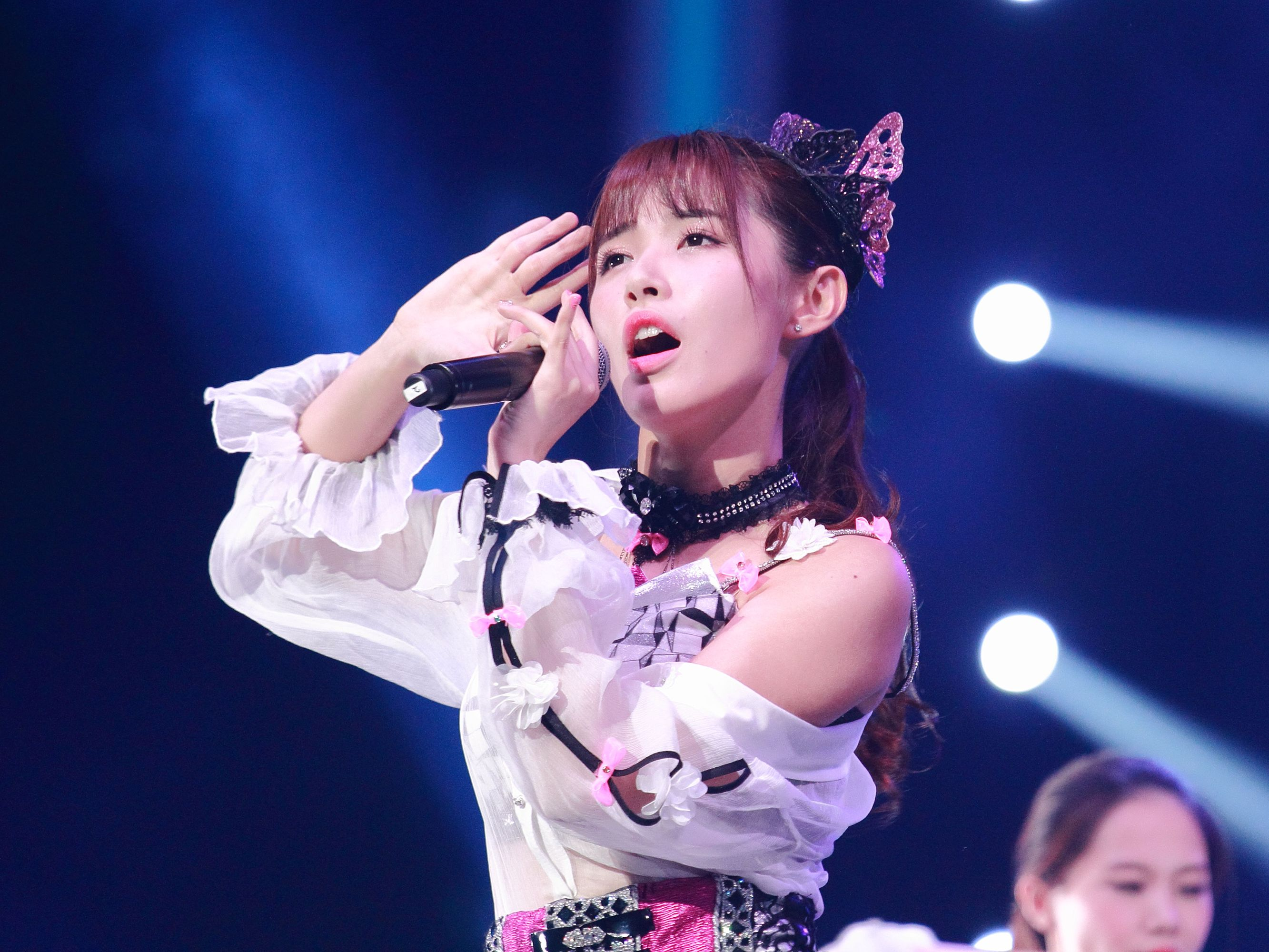
- Dai in 2015
- Born: February 8, 1993 (age 33); Shanghai, China
- Other name: Diamond
- Occupations: Singer; actress
- Years active: 2013–present
- Awards: AAA 2017
- Musical career
- Genres: Pop; Mandopop; K-pop; J-pop
- Instrument: Vocals
- Labels: Star48; Ninestyle Model Agency; Ninestyle Music

Chinese name
- Traditional Chinese: 戴萌
- Simplified Chinese: 戴萌
Transcriptions
Standard Mandarin
- Hanyu Pinyin: Dài Méng

Dai Meng (Chinese: 戴萌; pinyin: Dài Méng; born 8 February 1993) is a Chinese idol singer. She is formerly the co-captain of Team SII of female idol group SNH48 and member of its sub-units 7Senses.

== Career ==
On 14 October 2012, during an SNH48 press conference, Dai was announced as one of the first-generation members of SNH48. On 23 December, SNH48 was invited to the inauguration ceremony of the Fudan University Student Union, and she made her first performance as an SNH48 member.

On 12 January 2013, Dai performed on SNH48 Research Students 1st Stage, "Give Me Power!", as a Research Student. On 25 May, she performed at the "Blooming For You" Concert. On 11 November, she was promoted to SNH48 Team SII, and on 16 December, she performed at the SNH48 Guangzhou Concert.

On 18 January 2014, Dai participated in the Red and White Concert, of which Team SII emerged as winner. On 26 July, during SNH48's first General Election, Dai came in 13th with 5785 votes, subsequently becoming part of the Senbatsu for their fifth single.

On 31 January 2015, Dai performed at SNH48 Request Hour Setlist Best 30 2015. On 25 July, during SNH48's second General Election, she came in 15th with 17907.3 votes, and became part of the senbatsu for that year. On 13 September, during the SNH48 Theater second anniversary concert, Dai was announced as the new captain of Team SII after Mo Han resigned for personal reasons. On 31 October, Dai became part of SNH48's sub-unit Style-7.

In 2016, she became one of the ambassadors for AKG. On 23 July, she was involved in the filming of Heroes of Remix. On 30 July, during SNH48's third General Election, Dai came in 12th with 41,511.8 votes.

On March 19, Dai was announced as one of the members of SNH48's sub-unit 7SENSES. They released their first EP, "7SENSES" on April 20. On July 29, during SNH48's fourth General Election, Dai came in 11th with 53659.1 votes.

== Discography ==
=== With SNH48 ===
==== EPs ====
Year	No.	Title	Role	Notes
2013	1	Heavy Rotation	A-side	Debut with SNH48 Team SII
2013	2	Flying Get	A-side	
2013	3	Fortune Cookie of Love	A-side	
2014	4	Heart Electric	A-side	
2014	5	UZA	A-side	
2015	6	Give Me Five!	B-side	
2015	7	After Rain	A-side	
2015	8	Manatsu no Sounds Good!	A-side	
2015	9	Halloween Night	A-side	
2015	10	New Year's Bell	A-side	
2016	11	Engine of Youth	A-side	
2016	12	Dream Land	A-side	
2016	13	Princess's Cloak	A-side	
2016	14	Happy Wonder World	B-side	
2017	15	Each Other's Future	B-side	
2017	16	Summer Pirates	B-side	Sang on "Area 48" as part of Team SII
2017	17	Dawn in Naples	A-side	

==== Albums ====
- Mae Shika Mukanee (2014)

== Units ==
=== SNH48 Stage Units ===
Stage No.	Song	Notes
Team SII 1st Stage "Saishuu Bell ga Naru"	Gomen ne Jewel 对不起我的宝贝	With Xu Jiaqi, Wu Zhehan and Mo Han
Team SII 1st Stage "Saishuu Bell ga Naru"	16nin Shimai no Uta 16人姐妹歌	With Chen Si and Qian Beiting
Team SII 2nd Stage "Nagai Hikari"	Tsundere! 傲娇女孩	With Qiu Xinyi and Chen Si
Team SII 3rd Stage "Pajama Drive"	Junjou Shugi 纯情主义	With Chen Si and Qian Beiting
Team SII 4th Stage "RESET"	Seifuku Resistance 再见，制服	With Zhang Yuge and Zhao Jiamin
Team SII 5th Stage "Yume wo Shinaseru Wake ni Ikanai"	Confession 不曾后悔	With Kong Xiaoyin, Yuan Yuzhen and Xu Chenchen
Team SII 6th Stage "Journey of the Heart"	Bandage of a friend 好友创可贴	With Li Yuqi, Xu Zixuan and Feng Xiaofei
Team SII 7th Stage "District 48"	Love is not central 爱未央	With Xu Jiaqi

=== Concert units ===
Year	Date	Name	Song	Notes
2013	25 May	Blooming For You Concert	None	
2013	16 November	Guangzhou Concert	None	
2014	18 January	Red and White Concert	Arashi no Yoru ni wa 暴风雨之夜	With Xu Jiaqi, Chen Si and Wen Jingjie
2014	26 July	SNH48 Sousenkyo Concert in Shanghai	Dakishimeraretara 如果你拥抱我	With Xu Jiaqi and Kong Xiaoyin
2015	31 January	Request Hour Setlist Best 30 2015	Junjou Shugi 纯情主义	With Chen Si and Qian Beiting
2015	25 July	2nd General Election Concert	None	
2015	26 December	Request Hour Setlist Best 30 2015 (2nd Edition)	Dakishimeraretara 如果你拥抱我; Seifuku Resistance 再见，制服	With Huang Tingting and Qiu Xinyi; With Mo Han and Zhang Yuge
2016	30 July	3rd General Election Concert	Higurashi no Koi 暮蝉之恋	With Huang Tingting
2017	7 January	Request Hour Setlist Best 50 (3rd Edition)	Kuchi Utsushi no Chocolate 巧克力之吻; Ookami to Pride 狼与自尊	With Wan Lina and Xu Zixuan; With Mo Han

== Filmography ==
=== Movies ===
Year	Title	Role	Notes
2015	Balala the Fairies: Princess Camellia 巴啦啦小魔仙之魔箭公主	Sally 小蓝	

=== Television series ===
Year	Title	Role	Notes
2017	Super Star: The Counter Attack Star Shine 逆袭之星途璀璨	Bai Xinlu 白欣露	

=== Variety shows ===
Year	Date	Channel	Title	Notes
2013	11 August	Beijing Television	Top Chinese Music Awards 音乐风云榜	With Qiu Xinyi
2013	15 December - 2 February	Dragon Television	China's Got Talent	
2015	14 January, 4 April	Hunan Television	I Am A Great Beauty 我是大美人	With Ju Jingyi, Li Yitong, Qiu Xinyi, Mo Han and Wu Zhehan
2016	10 January - 4 April	Tudou, Youku	National Girl 国民美少女	
2016	21 February	CCTV-1	Dream Star Partner 梦想星搭档	
2016	2 July	Hunan Television	Happy Camp 快乐大本营	With SNH48, BEJ48 and GNZ48
2016	31 July, 14 August	Jiangsu Television	Heroes of Remix 盖世英雄	
2016	12 August	Youku	Rio Adventure 里约大冒险	
2016	10 September	Hunan Television	Happy Camp 快乐大本营	With Top 16
2016	17 December	CCTV-3	Push The Button 全家好拍档	
2016	23 December	iQiyi	Friday Show 大牌对王牌	With Huang Ting Ting, Mo Han and Gong Shiqi
