= Hylicinae =

Scientific classification
- Domain: Eukaryota
- Kingdom: Animalia
- Phylum: Arthropoda
- Class: Insecta
- Order: Hemiptera
- Suborder: Auchenorrhyncha
- Family: Cicadellidae
- Subfamily: Hylicinae; Distant, 1908

Tribes
- Hylicini; Melliolini; Sudrini

Subfamily of leafhoppers

Hylicinae is a subfamily in the family Cicadellidae (leafhoppers).

== Description ==
Hylicine leafhoppers are moderately robust insects and are brownish to greyish in colouration. They feed on Dicotyledon trees and shrubs.

== Distribution ==
This subfamily is mostly confined to the Afrotropical and Indomalayan regions.

== Tribes and genera ==
There are three tribes in the subfamily.

=== Hylicini ===
Erected by Distant in 1908.

- Assiringia Distant, 1908
- Hylica Stål, 1863
- Traiguma Distant, 1908
- Wolfella Spinola, 1850

=== Malmaemichungiini ===
Erected by Metcalf in 1962. It is monotypic.

- Melliola Hedicke, 1923

=== Sudrini ===
Erected by Schmidt, E. in 1962.

- Balala Distant, 1908
- Hatigoria Distant, 1908
- Hemisudra Schmidt, E., 1911
- Kalasha Distant, 1908
- Karasekia Melichar, 1912
- Nacolus Jacobi, 1914
- Parasudra Schmidt, E., 1909
- Pseudosudra Schmidt, E., 1920
- Sudra Distant, 1908
