= Balala the Fairies: Princess Camellia =

- Poster
- Chinese: 巴啦啦小魔仙之魔箭公主
- Directed by: Chen Cheng
- Starring: Zhao Yue; Dai Meng; Zhao Jinmai; Daisy Waite; Xinel Simpson
- Production companies: Alpha Pictures (Shanghai); Alpha Pictures Investment (Beijing); Dayinmu Film Distribution; Beijing KAKU Cartoon Satellite TV
- Distributed by: Alpha Pictures (Shanghai); Alpha Pictures Investment (Beijing); Dayinmu Film Distribution
- Release date: 1 October 2015
- Running time: 92 minutes
- Country: China
- Language: Mandarin
- Box office: US$5.9 million

Balala the Fairies: Princess Camellia is a 2015 Chinese fantasy adventure film directed by Chen Cheng and starring Zhao Yue and Dai Meng of SNH48, Zhao Jinmai, Daisy Waite and Xinel Simpson. It is the third film in the Balala the Fairies film series, following 2014's Balala the Fairies: The Magic Trial. It was released in China on 1 October.

== Plot ==
In the kingdom of Boka Boka, lives Princess Camellia, who can speak to magical creatures. One day, she loses control of three such creatures, causing them to flee. She sets on a quest to find them and lands on Earth.

Meanwhile, human sisters Maggie and Michelle are eager to see SNH48 live, but their fairy caretaker Shirley doesn't agree. They find Camellia, and together with her and fellow Princess Emma of Gemini, they set off to the magical creatures.

== Cast ==
- Zhao Yue as Camellia
- Dai Meng as Sally
- Zhao Jinmai as Maggie
- Daisy Waite as Michelle
- Xinel Simpson as Emma/Beibei

== Reception ==
The film grossed CN¥38.3 million at the Chinese box office.
