= IDOLS Ft =

Chinese girl group

- Also known as: Idol Studio Ft, IDFT
- Origin: Shanghai, China
- Years active: 2019-present
- Labels: Shanghai Star48 Culture & Media Group Co, ltd.
- Members: See "Current members"
- Past members: See "Past members"
- Website: idft.snh48.com

IDOLS Ft (Full name: Idol Studio Ft; abbr. IDFT) is a Chinese idol girl group based on the Internet, which is operated by Shanghai Star48 Culture & Media Group Co., ltd. and established on January 19, 2019. Currently, the group consists of 88 members transferred from the other girl groups of SNH48 Group.

== Overview ==
IDOLS Ft is an idol girl group based on the Internet operated by Shanghai Star48 Culture & Media Group Co., ltd. According to the official introduction, the members would mainly interact with their fans on social media developed by the operator itself and the third-party developers. Moreover, the operator introduced a selecting system, allowing qualified members to become members of SNH48 or its sister groups.

== History ==
On January 19, 2019, Star48 announced the recombination plan of SNH48 Group, including the foundation of IDOLS Ft. All of the founding members were transferred from the other girl groups of SNH48 Group.

== Members ==
Currently, the girl group consists of 88 members, including 9 past members of SNH48, 14 past members of BEJ48, 12 past members of GNZ48, 27 past members of SHY48, and 26 past members of CKG48.

=== Current members ===
Name	Birth date (age)	Birthplace	Transferred from	Concurrent qualification
Bian Jianing (Chinese: 卞佳宁; pinyin: Biàn Jiāníng)	October 14, 2005 (age 19)	Liaoning	SHY48 Trainee	
Cao Loudan (Chinese: 曹露丹; pinyin: Cáo Lòudān)	May 23, 2003 (age 21)	Chongqing	CKG48 Team K	CKG48
Cheng Yi (Chinese: 程一; pinyin: Chéng Yī) (Note: Members without signing additional contracts of IDOLS Ft.)	December 9	Anhui	SHY48 Trainee	
Chen Yunling (Chinese: 陈韫凌; pinyin: Chén Yùnlíng) (Note: Unofficially resigned on February 26, 2019.)	December 13, 1997 (age 27)	Wuhan, Hubei	SNH48 Team X	
Diao Ying (Chinese: 刁滢; pinyin: Diāo Yíng)	November 24	Guangdong	SHY48 Trainee	
Dai Ziwei (Chinese: 戴紫薇; pinyin: Dài Zǐwēi) (Note: Unofficially resigned on June 3, 2019; held her last event on June 8.)	February 20, 1998 (age 27)	Chongqing	CKG48 Team K	
Feng Jiabao (Chinese: 冯嘉宝; pinyin: Féng Jiābǎo)	August 20	Liaoning	SHY48 Trainee	
Feng Jiaxi (Chinese: 冯嘉希; pinyin: Féng Jiāxī) (Note: Unofficially resigned on January 4, 2019; held her last event on January 20.)	June 4, 1996 (age 28)	Zhuhai, Guangdong	GNZ48 Team NIII	
Feng Yiying (Chinese: 冯译莹; pinyin: Féng Yìyíng) (Note: Unofficially resigned on January 21, 2019.)	March 24, 1999 (age 25)	Liaoning	SHY48 Team SIII	
Fu Ziqi (Chinese: 付紫琪; pinyin: Fù Zǐqí)	August 31, 1998 (age 26)	Dalian, Liaoning	SHY48 Team SIII	
Gao Xueyi (Chinese: 高雪逸; pinyin: Gāo Xuěyì) (Note: Data missing on the official website.)	October 27, 2000 (age 24)	Chongqing	GNZ48 Team NIII	CKG48
Gao Zhixian (Chinese: 高志娴; pinyin: Gāo Zhìxían)	October 1, 1998 (age 26)	Ningbo, Zhejiang	SHY48 Team HIII	
Huang Jiayi (Chinese: 黄嘉怡; pinyin: Huáng Jiāyí) (Note: Unofficially resigned on July 30, 2018.)	April 5	Shanghai	SHY48 Team HIII	
Han Linqin (Chinese: 韩林芹; pinyin: Hán Línqín)	April 21, 1997 (age 27)	Nanchong, Sichuan	CKG48 Team K	
Huang Wanying (Chinese: 黄琬璎; pinyin: Huáng Wǎnyīng)	March 24, 1998 (age 26)	Sichuan	CKG48 Team K	CKG48
Jiang Xin (Chinese: 江鑫; pinyin: Jiāng Xīn)	January 18, 2003 (age 22)	Chongqing	SNH48 Team HII	CKG48
Kang Zhaowei (Chinese: 康兆薇; pinyin: Kāng Zhàowēi)	February 9, 2003 (age 22)	Chongqing	CKG48 Team C	
Lan Hao (Chinese: 兰昊; pinyin: Lán Hào)	November 27	Beijing	BEJ48 Team J	
Li Hui (Chinese: 李慧; pinyin: Lǐ Huì)	November 8, 1996 (age 28)	Chengde, Hebei	SHY48 Team SIII	CKG48
Li Hailin (Chinese: 李海淋; pinyin: Lǐ Hǎilín)	November 30	Sichuan	BEJ48 Trainee	
Li Hongyao (Chinese: 李泓瑶; pinyin: Lǐ Hóngyáo)	March 30, 2000 (age 24)	Chuxiong, Yunnan	BEJ48 Team J	
Lai Junyi (Chinese: 赖俊亦; pinyin: Lài Jùnyì)	July 28, 2002 (age 22)	Chengdu, Sichuan	GNZ48 Team Z	CKG48
Liang Ke (Chinese: 梁可; pinyin: Liáng Kě) (Note: Unofficially resigned on January 19, 2019.)	March 23, 1999 (age 25)	Gansu	GNZ48 Team G	
Li Qing (Chinese: 李晴; pinyin: Lǐ Qíng) (Note: Unofficially resigned on January 19, 2019; held her last event on February 25.)	September 9, 1999 (age 25)	Tieling, Liaoning	SHY48 Team HIII	
Li Qingyu (Chinese: 李清雨; pinyin: Lǐ Qīngyǔ)	April 6, 1998 (age 26)	Guizhou	BEJ48 Trainee	
Li Suhong (Chinese: 李苏洪; pinyin: Lǐ Sūhóng)	June 20, 1995 (age 29)	Anhui	SHY48 Team HIII	
Luo Xueli (Chinese: 罗雪丽; pinyin: Luó Xuělì) (Note: Unofficially resigned on July 22, 2018; held her last event on July 30.)	June 6, 2000 (age 24)	Guiyang, Guizhou	BEJ48 Team E	
Liu Yihan (Chinese: 刘弋菡; pinyin: Liú Yìhàn) (Note: Originally named Deng Qian (Chinese: 邓倩; pinyin: Dèng Qiàn).)	May 21, 1999 (age 25)	Suining, Sichuan	CKG48 Team K	CKG48
Liu Yuqing (Chinese: 刘宇晴; pinyin: Liú Yǔqíng)	March 29	Liaoning	SHY48 Trainee	
Lei Yuxiao (Chinese: 雷宇霄; pinyin: Léi Yǔxiāo)	November 3, 2002 (age 22)	Guangzhou, Guangdong	CKG48 Team C	CKG48
Mao Qiyu (Chinese: 毛其羽; pinyin: Máo Qíyǔ) (Note: Unofficially resigned on July 30, 2018; held her last event on December 30.)	December 1, 1998 (age 26)	Shanghai	BEJ48 Team B	
Men Xiutian (Chinese: 门秀天; pinyin: Mén Xiùtiān) (Note: Unofficially resigned on January 30, 2019.)	January 6, 2004 (age 21)	Qingdao, Shandong	GNZ48 Trainee	
Meng Yue (Chinese: 孟玥; pinyin: Mèng Yuè) (Note: Unofficially resigned on February 8, 2020.)	March 11, 2003 (age 22)	Chongqing	CKG48 Team C	
Mao Yihan (Chinese: 毛译晗; pinyin: Máo Yìhán)	November 27, 1999 (age 25)	Chongqing	CKG48 Team C	CKG48
Peng Yuhan (Chinese: 彭榆涵; pinyin: Péng Yúhán)	January 18, 2003 (age 22)	Hunan	CKG48 Team K	CKG48
Qiao Yuke (Chinese: 乔钰珂; pinyin: Qiáo Yùkē)	March 23, 2000 (age 24)	Henan	BEJ48 Team J	
Qu Yuemeng (Chinese: 曲悦萌; pinyin: Qū Yuèméng)	August 31	Dalian, Liaoning	SHY48 Team HIII	
Qiao Yuzhen (Chinese: 谯玉珍; pinyin: Qiáo Yùzhēn)	December 26, 1996 (age 28)	Guang'an, Sichuan	CKG48 Team C	CKG48
Ren Yuelin (Chinese: 任玥霖; pinyin: Rén Yuèlín)	October 23, 2001 (age 23)	Hunan	BEJ48 Team J	
Shang Guan (Chinese: 尚官; pinyin: Shàng Guān)	April 15	Shandong	SHY48 Trainee	
Sun Min (Chinese: 孙敏; pinyin: Sūn mǐn) (Note: Unofficially resigned on January 21, 2019; held her last event on February 25.)	February 25	Luzhou, Sichuan	SHY48 Team SIII	
Shu Xiang (Chinese: 舒湘; pinyin: Shū Xiāng) (Note: Unofficially resigned in January 2019.)	July 23, 2002 (age 22)	Chengdu, Sichuan	GNZ48 Trainee	
Tian Mi (Chinese: 田密; pinyin: Tián Mì) (Note: Unofficially resigned on September 13, 2019.)	January 15, 2002 (age 23)	Chongqing	CKG48 Trainee	
Tian Qianlan (Chinese: 田倩兰; pinyin: Tián Qiànlán)	January 17, 1998 (age 27)	Sichuan	CKG48 Team C	CKG48
Tian Zhenzhen (Chinese: 田祯臻; pinyin: Tián Zhēnzhēn)	March 3, 2002 (age 23)	Chongqing	CKG48 Team K	
Wu Hanqi (Chinese: 伍寒琪; pinyin: Wú Hánqí)	April 7, 2000 (age 24)	Sichuan	CKG48 Team C	
Wu Jingjing (Chinese: 吴晶晶; pinyin: Wú Jīngjīng) (Note: Unofficially resigned on February 27, 2019.)	June 30, 1998 (age 26)	Hunan	CKG48 Team K	
Wang Jiayu (Chinese: 王嘉瑜; pinyin: Wáng Jiāyú) (Note: Graduated from BEJ48 on September 28, 2019, and joined IDOLS Ft on October 5.)	May 2	Chongqing	BEJ48 Team E	CKG48
Wang Lujiao (Chinese: 王露皎; pinyin: Wáng Lùjiǎo) (Note: Unofficially resigned on January 20, 2019.)	February 17, 1995 (age 30)	Dazhou, Sichuan	CKG48 Team K	
Wang Mengzhu (Chinese: 王梦竹; pinyin: Wáng Mèngzhú)	December 29	Liaoning	CKG48 Team C	CKG48
Wu Xiaodi (Chinese: 武晓迪; pinyin: Wǔ Xiǎodí)	September 6	Henan	SHY48 Trainee	
Wei Xiaoyan (Chinese: 魏小燕; pinyin: Wèi Xiǎoyàn)	February 21, 1997 (age 28)	Fujian	CKG48 Team K	CKG48
Wu Xueyu (Chinese: 吴学雨; pinyin: Wú Xuéyǔ)	April 15, 1999 (age 25)	Sichuan	CKG48 Team K	CKG48
Wang Yubo (Chinese: 王娱博; pinyin: Wáng Yúbó)	July 10, 1999 (age 25)	Xuzhou, Jiangsu	CKG48 Team C	
Wang Yongqi (Chinese: 王永祺; pinyin: Wáng Yǒngqí)	July 5	Jilin	SHY48 Trainee	
Wang Zi (Chinese: 王梓; pinyin: Wáng Zǐ)	December 23	Gansu	SHY48 Trainee	GNZ48 Team Z
Xu Feiran (Chinese: 徐斐然; pinyin: Xú Fěirán)	March 4	Sichuan	SHY48 Trainee	
Xiong Qinxian (Chinese: 熊沁娴; pinyin: Xióng Qìnxián)	August 7, 1999 (age 25)	Hangzhou, Zhejiang	SNH48 Team HII; SNH48 Team Ft	
Xiang Wang (Chinese: 相望; pinyin: Xiāng Wàng)	October 11, 1998 (age 26)	Liaoning	SHY48 Team HIII	
Xu Wanyu (Chinese: 许婉玉; pinyin: Xǔ Wǎnyù) (Note: Unofficially resigned on January 26, 2019.)	October 12, 2000 (age 24)	Shangqiu, Henan	BEJ48 Team J	
Xu Yi (Chinese: 许逸; pinyin: Xǔ Yì)	October 7, 1995 (age 29)	Leshan, Sichuan	SNH48 Team NII	
Xu Yiren (Chinese: 徐伊人; pinyin: Xú Yīrén) (Note: Unofficially resigned on March 4, 2019.)	February 20, 1996 (age 29)	Hangzhou, Zhejiang	SNH48 Team SII	
Xiong Yiyi (Chinese: 熊依依; pinyin: Xióng Yīyī) (Note: Unofficially resigned on January 4, 2019.)	October 5	Hubei	BEJ48 Trainee	
Yang Huiting (Chinese: 杨惠婷; pinyin: Yáng Huìtíng) (Note: Unofficially resigned on January 30, 2019.)	April 8, 1998 (age 26)	Shenzhen, Guangdong	SNH48 Team HII	
Yu Jiayi (Chinese: 於佳怡; pinyin: Yú Jiāyí) (Note: Unofficially resigned on January 29, 2019.)	October 29, 1998 (age 26)	Shanghai	SNH48 Team HII	
Yang Meiqi (Chinese: 杨美琪; pinyin: Yáng Měiqí)	August 12, 1999 (age 25)	Anhui	SNH48 Team Ft	
Yan Yudie (Chinese: 鄢羽蝶; pinyin: Yān Yǔdié) (Note: Graduated from GNZ48 on January 19, 2019, and joined IDOLS Ft on March 11. Unofficially resigned on February 5, 2020.)	May 10, 2000 (age 24)	Chongqing	GNZ48 Trainee	
Yang Yunhan (Chinese: 杨允涵; pinyin: Yáng Yǔnhán)	March 17, 1997 (age 28)	Liaoning	SHY48 Team SIII	CKG48
Yang Yuxin (Chinese: 杨宇馨; pinyin: Yáng Yǔxīn)	November 7, 1998 (age 26)	Henan	BEJ48 Trainee	SNH48 Team NII
Zhang-Han Zimo (Chinese: 张韩紫陌; pinyin: Zhāng-Hán Zǐmò)	January 31, 2000 (age 25)	Beijing	BEJ48 Team J	
Zeng Jia (Chinese: 曾佳; pinyin: Zēng Jiā) (Note: Unofficially resigned on April 17, 2020; held her last event on April 24.)	October 24, 1999 (age 25)	Chongqing	CKG48 Team C	
Zhang Jinyu (Chinese: 张瑾瑜; pinyin: Zhāng Jǐnyú)	July 10	Jilin	SHY48 Trainee	
Zhou Jiayi (Chinese: 周佳怡; pinyin: Zhōu Jiāyí)	August 12	Liaoning	SHY48 Team SIII	
Zhu Min (Chinese: 朱敏; pinyin: Zhū Mǐn)	June 1	Hubei	SHY48 Team HIII	
Zhang Minqi (Chinese: 张敏淇; pinyin: Zhāng Mǐnqí) (Note: Unofficially resigned on March 1, 2019.)	December 17, 2000 (age 24)	Shenzhen, Guangdong	SNH48 Team Ft	
Zhou Qianyu (Chinese: 周倩玉; pinyin: Zhōu Qiànyù) (Note: Graduated from GNZ48 on January 19, 2019, and joined IDOLS Ft on September 7.)	April 18, 2000 (age 24)	Neijiang, Sichuan	GNZ48 Team G	CKG48
Zheng Shiqi (Chinese: 郑诗琪; pinyin: Zhèng Shīqí)	July 5	Shenyang, Liaoning	SHY48 Team SIII	
Zhao Siyu (Chinese: 赵思雨; pinyin: Zhào Sīyǔ) (Note: Unofficially resigned on May 10, 2019.)	May 7	Sichuan	CKG48 Trainee	
Zhou Tongran (Chinese: 周桐冉; pinyin: Zhōu Tóngrǎn)	June 4, 1994 (age 30)	Shandong	CKG48 Team K	
Zuo Xin (Chinese: 左欣; pinyin: Zuǒ Xīn)	December 24, 2001 (age 23)	Chongqing	CKG48 Team C	CKG48
Zhao Xinyu (Chinese: 赵欣雨; pinyin: Zhào Xīnyǔ)	July 10, 2001 (age 23)	Dongguan, Guangdong	GNZ48 Team Z	
Zhu Yan (Chinese: 朱燕; pinyin: Zhū Yàn)	August 20	Dalian, Liaoning	SHY48 Team SIII	
Zhao Yimin (Chinese: 赵翊民; pinyin: Zhào Yìmín) (Note: Graduated from GNZ48 on January 19, 2019, and joined IDOLS Ft on April 13, 2020.)	August 18, 1997 (age 27)	Zhejiang	GNZ48 Team Z	
Zhang Youning (Chinese: 张幼柠; pinyin: Zhāng Yòuníng) (Note: Graduated from SHY48 on April 19, 2019, and joined IDOLS Ft on June 2.)	October 27, 2001 (age 23)	Guang'an, Sichuan	SHY48 Team HIII	CKG48
Zhang Yuqian (Chinese: 张语倩; pinyin: Zhāng Yǔqiàn)	April 3	Enshi, Hubei	BEJ48 Trainee	
Zhao Zehui (Chinese: 赵泽慧; pinyin: Zhào Zéhuì)	April 25	Shaanxi	CKG48 Team K	
Zhang Zeting (Chinese: 章泽婷; pinyin: Zhāng Zétíng)	October 29, 2002 (age 22)	Shenzhen, Guangdong	GNZ48 Trainee	
Zhang Ziying (Chinese: 张紫颖; pinyin: Zhāng Zǐyǐng)	March 16, 2003 (age 22)	Yangjiang, Guangdong	GNZ48 Trainee	

=== Past members ===
Name _{(Birth date, birthplace)}	Transferred from	Notes
Cheng Ziyu (Chinese: 程子钰; pinyin: Chéng Zǐyù) (April 29, 1999 (age 25) in Changsha, Hunan)	GNZ48 Team G	Graduated on April 26, 2019 Unofficially resigned on February 19, 2019
Dai Ling (Chinese: 代玲; pinyin: Dài Líng) (July 27, 1999 (age 25) in Guang'an, Sichuan)	GNZ48 Team Z	Graduated on April 26, 2019 Members without signing additional contracts of IDOLS Ft
Huang Lirong (Chinese: 黄黎蓉; pinyin: Huáng Líróng) (January 23, 1999 (age 26) in Changsha, Hunan)	GNZ48 Team G	Graduated on April 26, 2019 Members without signing additional contracts of IDOLS Ft
Zhang Dansan (Chinese: 张丹三; pinyin: Zhāng Dānsān) (April 28, 1997 (age 27) in Wuhan, Hubei)	SNH48 Team X	Transferred to SNH48 Team X on July 8, 2019
Zheng Yifan (Chinese: 郑一凡; pinyin: Zhèng Yīfán) (May 9, 2001 (age 23) in Beijing)	BEJ48 Team E	Transferred to BEJ48 Team E on December 27, 2019
Si Polin (Chinese: 司珀琳; pinyin: Sī Pòlín) (October 18 in Hebei)	SHY48 Team SIII	Transferred to GNZ48 Team Z on January 1, 2020

== Controversies ==
The nature of this girl group, as well as what its members would mainly do, has raised up large controversies by Chinese netizens. Some hold the opinion that Star48, the operator of this girl group, "transformed the idols into online streamers," and some other netizens rebuked the operator, saying that "the fans who spent their money for supporting their idols, and then received the bad news that the idols who they support should start their new career as streamers for the reason that the teams they once belonged to were dismissed, would never feel happy no matter who he/she is."

When responding to the inquiries of the mass media, Star48 said the group is aimed at "facilitating the interactions between members and fans, as well as allowing the latter to participate in the process of bringing up the former," and pointed out that how the group runs is constitutionally the same as reality competitions. Plus, it stated that the members would have possibilities to transfer to SNH48, BEJ48, or GNZ48 according to their performances and popularity.
