= Zhang Yuge =

Chinese idol singer (born 1996)

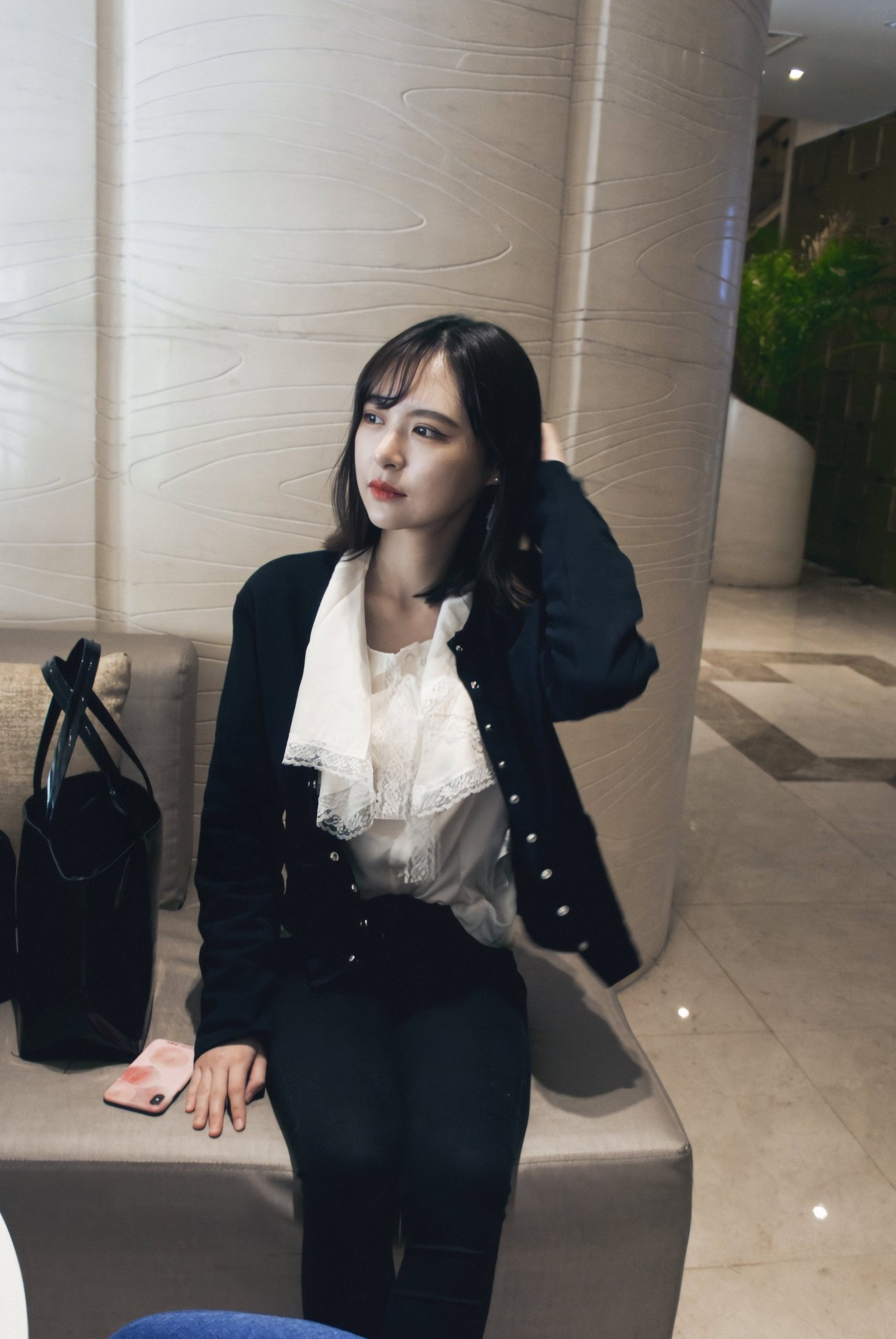
- Zhang in 2019
- Born: May 11, 1996 (age 30); Harbin, Heilongjiang, China
- Other name: Tako
- Occupations: Singer; dancer; actress
- Years active: 2013–present
- Musical career
- Genres: Pop; Mandopop; K-pop; J-pop
- Instrument: Vocals
- Labels: Star48; Ninestyle Model Agency; Ninestyle Music
- Formerly of: SNH48; Style-7; 7Senses

Chinese name
- Traditional Chinese: 張語格
- Simplified Chinese: 张语格
Transcriptions
Standard Mandarin
- Hanyu Pinyin: Zhāng Yǔgé

Zhang Yuge (simplified Chinese: 张语格; traditional Chinese: 張語格; pinyin: Zhāng Yǔgé; born May 11, 1996, in Harbin, Heilongjiang, China) is a Chinese singer and actress. She debuted as a member of female idol group SNH48, where she was part of Team SII from its formation to her graduation in 2020; in addition, she was also a member of its sub-units Style-7 and 7Senses.

== Career ==
On 14 October 2012, Zhang Yuge became one of the 26 shortlisted candidates during the recruitment of SNH48 first-generation members. On 12 January 2013, she made her first public appearance during SNH48 Research Students' 1st Stage, "Give Me Power!" On April 30, she was invited to perform at the Shanghai Strawberry Festival 2013, together with other SNH48 members. On 25 May, she performed on the "Blooming For You Concert" with other first-generation members. On 31 December, she performed during Dragon Television's New Year Countdown 2014.

On 18 January 2014, Zhang performed in the SNH48 "Red & White Concert". During SNH48's first General Election, held on 26 July, Zhang came in fifth with 9,061 votes, and became part of SNH48's Senbatsu for their 5th single.

On 17 March 2015, Zhang she went to Saipan to film the music video for "Manatsu no Sounds Good!", of which she took up her first centre position. On 26 July, during SNH48's second General Election, she came in fifth with 32,306 votes. On 31 October, she was announced as one of the members of its sub-unit, Style-7.

On 20 April 2016, it was announced that Zhang would be one of the members of SNH48's sub-unit, 7SENSES.

On 30 July, Zhang was ranked eighth during SNH48's third General Election with 66,867.5 votes.

On 29 July 2017, during SNH48's fourth General Election, Zhang came in ninth with 78,345.6 votes.

On 28 July 2018, during SNH48's fifth General Election, Zhang came in sixteenth with 52,339.94 votes. In the same year, Zhang performed in the TV series "So Young".

On 27 July 2019, during SNH48's sixth General Election, Zhang came in fourth with 965,200 votes.

In 2020, Zhang participated in the reality girl group survival show Idol Producer 3 which aired on March 12, 2020. She was eliminated in 20th episode with the rank 23rd.

On 31 October 2022, 7SENSES announced that Tako had left the group.

== Discography ==
=== Singles ===
Year	English title	Chinese title	Notes
2021	"Heaven"		

=== With SNH48 ===
==== EPs ====
Year	No.	Title	Role	Notes
2013	1	Heavy Rotation	A-side	Debut with SNH48 Team SII
2013	2	Flying Get	A-side	
2013	3	Fortune Cookie of Love	A-side	
2014	4	Heart Electric	A-side	
2014	5	UZA	A-side	
2015	6	Give Me Five!	A-side	
2015	7	After Rain	A-side	
2015	8	Manatsu no Sounds Good!	A-side	Center
2015	9	Halloween Night	A-side	
2015	10	New Year's Bell	A-side	Center
2016	11	Engine of Youth	A-side	
2016	12	Dream Land	B-side	
2016	13	Princess's Cloak	A-side	
2016	14	Happy Wonder World	B-side	
2017	15	Each Other's Future	B-side	
2017	16	Summer Pirates	B-side	Sang on "Area 48" as part of Team SII
2017	17	Dawn in Naples	A-side	
2018	20	Forest Theorem	A-side	
2018	21	Endless Story	A-side	
2019	25	The Song of Time	A-side	
2019	26	Wings of Youth	A-side	
2020	Graduation	Take Me	A-side	

==== Albums ====
- Mae Shika Mukanee (2014)

== Filmography ==
=== Movies ===
Year	Title	Role	Notes
2013	梦想预备生之半熟少女	Herself	
2015	Love, At First 爱之初体验		Guest appearance
2015	Documentary of SNH48 SNH48 少女的巴別塔	Herself	SNH48 documentary
2016	Soulvenir 纪念品	Xiaoyu 小雨	
2017	Almost Perfect: Love Actually 十全九美之真爱无双	Nie Qingchen 聂清尘	

=== TV series ===
Year	Title	Role	Notes
2014	Super! Soccer 球爱酒吧	Bobo 波波	
2016	Campus Beauty 贴身校花	Xia Shihan 夏诗涵	
2017	King Of Summer 贴身校花之君临天夏	Xia Shihan 夏诗涵	
