= Hong Peiyun =

Chinese idol singer (born 2001)

- Born: January 7, 2001 (age 24); Shanghai, China
- Occupations: Singer; actress
- Years active: 2015-present

Chinese name
- Traditional Chinese: 洪珮雲
- Simplified Chinese: 洪珮雲
Transcriptions
Standard Mandarin
- Hanyu Pinyin: Hóng Pèiyún
- Musical career
- Origin: China
- Genres: Pop, Mandopop
- Instrument: Vocals
- Labels: Star48; Ninestyle Model Agency; Ninestyle Music

Hong Peiyun (Chinese: 洪珮雲; pinyin: Hóng Pèiyún; born January 7, 2001, in Shanghai, China) is a Chinese idol singer. She is a member of Team HII of Chinese idol group SNH48, as well as its sub-unit, Color Girls.

== Career ==
On 25 July 2015, during SNH48's second General Election, Hong Peiyun was announced as one of the fifth-generation members of SNH48. On 9 December, she made her first public performance during Team XII's first stage, "Theater no Megami".

On 20 April 2016, Hong became part of SNH48's sub-unit, Color Girls. On 30 July, during SNH48's third General Election, she was ranked 31st with 16288.2 votes, becoming part of the Under Girls.

On July 29, 2017, during SNH48's fourth General Election, Hong came in 49th with 18878.7 votes, meanwhile becoming the center for Future Girls.

On February 3, 2018, during SNH48's fourth Request Time, Hong was transferred to Team HII following the disbandment of Team XII as part of the SNH48 Team Shuffle.

== Discography ==
=== With SNH48 ===
==== EPs ====
Year	No.	Title	Role	Notes
2016	11	Engine of Youth	A-side	First original EP
2016	12	Dream Land	B-side	Second original EP; Center
2016	13	Princess's Cloak	A-side	Ranked 31st in the 3rd General election Sang on "Romantic Melody" with Under Girls; Also sang on "It has to be you" with Team XII, center with Fei Qinyuan
2016	14	Happy Wonder World	A-side	
2017	15	Each Other's Future	B-side	Sang on "To All of You" with Team XII
2017	16	Summer Pirates	B-side	Sang on "Summer Color" with Team XII
2017	17	Dawn in Naples	B-side	Ranked 49th in the 4th General Election; Sang on "Military Uniform Faith" with Future Girls, center

=== With Color Girls ===
- 美少女时代 (2016)

== Units ==
=== SNH48 Stage Units ===
Stage No.	Song	Notes
Team XII 1st Stage "Theater no Megami"	Candy 糖	With Yan Jiaojun and Yu Jiayi; A Lineup; Center
Team XII 2nd Stage "Code XII"	Will Not 都不会	With Li Jia'en and Song Yushan

=== Concert units ===
Year	Date	Name	Song	Notes
2016	30 July	3rd General Election Concert	None	None
2017	7 January	Request Hour Setlist Best 50 (3rd Edition)	Kuroi Tenshi 黑天使	With Xie Leilei and Hu Xiaohui

== Personal life ==
Since April 2018, Hong and her family moved to Osaka, Japan for her further school studies.
