= Balala Hakkula Sangham =

Children's rights' organization (e. 1985)

- Formation: 1985
- Founder: activists and group of people
- Founded at: Andhra Pradesh now Telangana
- Type: social service
- Purpose: protect child from all kind of abuse
- Headquarters: 205, KUBERA TOWERS, HIMAYATNAGAR, Hyderabad 500029
- Location: Telangana
- Region served: Hyderabad
- Official language: Telugu
- Leader: Achyuta Rao

Balala Hakkula Sangham is an Indian Community that protects the rights of children. They oppose child marriage, sexual abuse and child labour. The community was founded in 1985. In July 2020 Balala Hakkula Sangham founder P Achyuta Rao died due to Covid.

== Services ==
The chief officer is Achyuta Rao. The sangham conducts a 2k walk with girls to oppose child marriage and allow girls to complete their studies before marriage. In the year 2018 the major demand for the walk saw thousands of girls participating to raise the minimum age for marriage of girls from 18 years to 21 years. The purpose of the walk also includes issues like child abuse, child labour and girl's education. It conducts cultural activities, competitions, and short film contests for children and supporting them in all aspects other than studies.
