= Balala the Fairies =

Chinese magical girl film metaseries

- The poster of Balala the Fairies show depicting the main characters
- Also known as: Balala, Little Magic Fairy
- Genre: Magical girl
- Directed by: Zhou Jianji; Li Sijie; Li Junze
- Starring: Mikan Liu; Liao Jingxuan; Huang Anyi; Jony Sun
- Opening theme: "Balala the Fairies" by A2A (AOA)
- Ending theme: "The Happy Money Box"
- Country of origin: China
- Original language: Mandarin
- No. of seasons: 10
- No. of episodes: 482

Production
- Producer: Cai Dongqing
- Running time: 25 minutes
- Production company: Alpha Group Co. Ltd.

Original release
- Release: 12 April 2008 – present

Balala the Fairies
- Chinese: 巴啦啦小魔仙
- Literal meaning: Balala, Little Magic Fairy
Transcriptions
Standard Mandarin
- Hanyu Pinyin: Bālālā xiǎo mó xian

Balala the Fairies, or Balala, Little Magic Fairy (Chinese: 巴啦啦小魔仙; pinyin: Bālālā xiǎo mó xian), is a Chinese magical girl metaseries created and produced by Alpha Group. Each series focuses on a group of magical girls fighting against evil and dark forces while following their ordinary lives and personal wishes. The first installment was the live-action series of the same name, which first aired in 2008. There are ten seasons in total and 482+ episodes.

== Plot ==
Each season focuses on a group of ordinary schoolgirls who are granted magical powers and talents and transform into the legendary warriors known as the Balala Fairies to fight against unknown evil forces. As the series progresses and enemies get stronger, they will gain more new items, stuff, and abilities to fight evil.

=== Balala the Fairies (2008–2009) ===
The Magic Fairy Castle, led by the Fairy Queen, is a place only fairies can learn magic and know how to use what they have learned to help others. The ill-tempered black magic fairy, Luna, steals the black magic and the fairy's colorful stone, and is never seen again. Shirley, the fairy who protects the colorful stone, came to earth to make up for her mistakes and to track down the fairy's colorful stone. Shirley hid in the octave box and was brought home by Maggie Lin (voiced by Sun Qiaolu), Michelle Lin's sister, and became the Lin family's little nanny. The three spent a happy life together and formed a deep friendship with each other. With the permission of the Fairy Queen, Shirley teaches Maggie and Michelle magic to become Balala Fairies on Earth. At the same time, Luna befriended a girl named Lily Yan and trained her to become a little black magic fairy.

=== Balala the Fairies: Rainbow Heart Stone (2011–2012) ===
Sara, the potential inheritor of the Fairy Castle and heir to the fairy throne, leaves for the Human World to look for her missing mother while also meeting the Lin sisters. After Shirley is assigned to bring Sara back to the Fairy World, Shaman Dragon brainwashes Sara's mother to attack the Fairy Castle. Since the rainbow above Fairy Castle is beginning to fade, the castle itself will be destroyed. Shirley, Maggie, and Michelle have to find a way to save the castle, while Sara wants her mother to come back to her senses so she can stop ruling the world.Source:

=== Balala the Fairies: Miracle Dance (2013–2014) ===
After failing to destroy the Fairy Castle, Queen Halle proceeds to attack the Kingdom of Gemini and captures the Gemini Princess Ella. Her sister, Princess Emma, manages to escape and hides in the Human World.

At the same time, the Night Star Box, the treasure that keeps he constellations safe, has disappeared, leaving the Earth in big trouble. In such a critical situation, the fairy Shirley, Fairy Prince Noah, and little fairies Maggie and Michelle are assigned to help Princess Emma and find the twelve Diamonds of the Night Star Box, rescue Ella, and save the two worlds.

=== Balala the Fairies: Finding Melody (2015–2016) ===
Wanting to help the fairy Queen find her disappeared friend Melody, who was a skilful music fairy from the Music Castle, Shirley, Maggie, Michelle, and Emma encounter nine Musical Magicians and fight with the dark musical fairy Voiceless. Shirley and the fairies suspect that Melody is connected with the dark powers.

=== Balala the Fairies: The Mystery Note (2015–2016) ===
The Queen of Fairy Castle gave Shirley a precious music treasure box on her birthday, which contains a mysterious musical gem. Queen Halle sent her son, Prince Omar, disguised as a human, to steal the gem. Halle used these musical gems to strengthen herself and take revenge on the Fairy Queen. In the face of strong enemies, the fairies once again worked together, and finally they defeated the evil with the power of justice and maintained the peace of the Fairy Castle.

=== Balala the Fairies: Over the Rainbow (2016–2017) ===
In the distance, not far from Fairy Castle, there is a magic kingdom called Colorful Castle. It is a place full of color, peace, and joy. On the edge of Colorful Castle, there is an island that is home to the Black Lord, who has woken from his sleep. The Black Lord, to make his land stronger, stole the magic color energy from Colorful Castle. The princess, who possessed great Color Magic, found herself defenseless as she was cursed and turned into an elf. By chance, Jessi, Hayley, and Amy — three girls from the human world — inadvertently broke into the Color Castle and turned into Fairies. With their colorful powers, they must fight against the Black Lord and save the Colorful Castle.

=== Balala the Fairies: Ocean Magic (2018–2021) ===
In the Magic Ocean, there is a mysterious and charming place called the Ocean Castle. When human girls Kaylyn Ling and Finn Xia accidentally met the mysterious Azure, they transformed from ordinary girls into magic fairies. Together, the three fairies and their Lolo partners protect the human world and the Magic Ocean, investigating the Krakens and the source of the ocean pollution.

In the second season, which premiered in 2020, the three fairies – Azure, Kaylyn, and Finn – returned to the human world to Yuyo Island and became trainees at the Ocean Conservation Hub. During their internship, they learn about marine life and actively participate in saving the sea animals. However, a mysterious group called the "Iron Eagle Squadron" turns up at Yuyo Island, using high-tech equipment to poach all sorts of marine life. The man behind this is one "Professor Rebus", a genius at building various machines. Azure, Kaylyn, and Finn must use their fairy powers in a battle to protect the marine life.

=== Balala the Fairies: Adventures on Planet Ao (2022) ===
On the Planet Ao, which was eroded by the dark power of Demon King Dake, a magic box suddenly fell onto the town. A resident, Taozi, rescues the doll in the magic box by chance, and the doll turns out to be the fairy Azure. Afterwards, many other fairies awaken as well. Wanting to defeat the Demon King Dake, who intends to rule the world, the Fairies search for the Energy Hearts while fighting against Dake's monsters. The secrets behind Azure's body are slowly revealed.

=== Balala the Fairies: Magic Star Fate Castle (2021–2022) ===
Normal Girls who live a normal life until they discover a Magical Fairy Kingdom, magical elves grant them magical powers from Magic Star Fate Castle, to save the Magic Star Fate castle they will need to fight a villain called "Fisna".

=== Balala the Fairies: Star Fate Butterfly Awakening (2023–2024) ===
Laura Xia, Cora Yan, and Sylvia Bai – along with their Transfer Elf partners Buding, Milu, and Lubi – awaken the Garden of Spirit Spring, Island of Fantastical Summer, and Park of Warm Autumn, which contains the energy of the four seasons.

=== Balala the Fairies: Jojo's Body Magic (2024) ===
The series focuses on the friendship between Balala Fairy, Laura Xia, and the adventurous Chicken Jojo, though they often clash in daily life. Jojo discovers all kinds of mysterious human body reactions. Whenever this happens, Laura wields her magic wand, using Balala power and bringing Jojo and Buding to the magical Balala power house to journey through the human body.

=== Balala the Fairies: Radiant Star Guardians (2024–2025) ===
The Fairies – Laura Xia, Cora Yan, Sylvia Bai, and Symin – felt the change in magic energy and boarded the Star Dream Moon Boat to enter the newly-opened Fantasy Night Realm. Wanting to protect the Fantasy Night Realm against the dark forces controlled by Nightfall, the fairies were recognized by the Radiant Stars and made the new Guardians of the Radiant Stars.

The Fairies passed the trial, awakening the power of the Radiant Stars, and forged friendships with Aiden and Connie as well. Together they fought against Nightfall, but they didn't expect to fall into his trap, accidentally lifting the seal and releasing him.

== Novels ==
In 2012, Zhou Yiwen's novel Balala Little Magician's Rainbow Heart Stone: Dark Prince Grea, a complete set of eight volumes, was published.

1. Mysterious New Students
2. The Legend of the Guardian Stone
3. The Dead Tree of Life
4. Magic Fairy Prince Play
5. Wish Meteor
6. Evil Magic Line
7. The Dark Prince Resurrection
8. The Sad Duel Song

Between 2013 and 2014, Peng Liurong's novels Balala Little Magic Fairy's Rainbow Heart Stone: Redemption of the Magic Spirit, a complete set of five volumes, was released, albeit incomplete.

1. Frozen Crystal Heart
2. Magic Aria
3. Breeze Fluttering
4. Rosy Junior
5. Flaming Night Mystery
