= List of Produce Camp 2020 contestants =

Produce Camp 2020 (Chinese: 《创造营2020》; pinyin: Chuàngzàoyíng Èrlíng èrlíng) is a 2020 Chinese reality competition show and spin-off of the South Korean television series Produce 101. 101 female trainees compete to debut in an 7-member girl group, with members selected by online voting from the viewers.

== Contestants ==
Color key

- Top 7 of the week
- Saved from elimination (Reserve trainee [Chinese: 旁听生; pinyin: Pángtīng shēng; lit. 'Audit trainee'])
- Eliminated in Episode 4 (first ranking announcement)
- Eliminated in Episode 5
- Eliminated in Episode 7 (second ranking announcement)
- Eliminated in Episode 9 (third ranking announcement)
- Eliminated in Episode 10 (final ranking announcement)
- Withdrew from the show
- Final debuting members

Company	Name	Judges' Evaluation		Rankings								
Company	Name	1	2	E02	E03	E04	E05	E06	E07	E08	E09	E10
Company	Name	1	2	#	#	#	#	#	#	#	#	#
Individual Trainee	Li Chengxi (李丞汐)	B (Main)	C (Reserve)	59	77	75 (Audit)	75 (Audit)	Eliminated				
1CM Lingyu Entertainment (1CM领誉)	Bi Shaoyan (Note: Former member of Chinese girl group BLINGBOOM (2017–2018)) (毕少岩)	C (Reserve)	C (Reserve)	43	61	78	Eliminated					
Love Survive (爱声存)	Chen Roubing (陈柔冰)	F (Back Seat)	C (Reserve)	51	80	85	Eliminated					
White Media (白色系)	Chen Xinye (陈欣叶)	F (Back Seat)	B (Main)	40	55	72 (Audit)	Left the show (Note: During the first ranking announcement, Zhong Xin, as center of the chosen winning team from LTG, saved Chen Xinye from elimination to come back as one of the Audit trainees. However, Chen Xinye later revealed that she would have to withdraw from the show due to health issues.)					
Bates Methinks Entertainment	Lana/Svetlana Yudina (拉娜)	C (Reserve)	B (Main)	27	29	43	13	17	26	22	22	Eliminated
Danmu Culture (蛋木文化)	Winnie/Zhong Feifei (仲菲菲)	F (Back Seat)	C (Reserve)	44	49	47	31	37	34	26	27	Eliminated
One Entertainment (缔壹娱乐)	Meng Huan (孟欢)	F (Back Seat)	C (Reserve)	61	52	56	Eliminated					
One Entertainment (缔壹娱乐)	Wu Xiaoning (吴晓凝)	F (Back Seat)	F (Back Seat)	65	93	93	Eliminated					
One Entertainment (缔壹娱乐)	Yu Yangzi (于扬子)	F (Back Seat)	F (Back Seat)	75	60	24	40	48	50	Eliminated		
One Entertainment (缔壹娱乐)	Yu Ziyu (余子鱼)	F (Back Seat)	C (Reserve)	70	59	35	43	50	52	Eliminated		
Gonna Star Media (光视传媒)	Wang Lina (王丽娜)	B (Main)	F (Back Seat)	35	47	54	48	51	51	Eliminated		
Gramarie Entertainment (果然娱乐)	Jiang Zhenyu (姜贞羽)	A (Priority)	A (Priority)	8	6	6	10	9	9	Left the show		
Hot Idol (好好榜样)	Kang Xi (康汐)	F (Back Seat)	F (Back Seat)	37	39	28	19	30	28	34	33	Eliminated
Hot Idol (好好榜样)	Sally/Liu Xiening (Note: Member of Korean girl group Gugudan) (刘些宁)	A (Priority)	C (Reserve)	3	4	5	5	6	6	6	7	6
Hot Idol (好好榜样)	Liu Yulu (刘雨露)	F (Back Seat)	F (Back Seat)	45	45	42	56	56	56	Eliminated		
Hot Idol (好好榜样)	Pan Xiaoxue (潘小雪)	F (Back Seat)	C (Reserve)	87	82	79	Eliminated					
BG Talent (黑金计划)	Shi Ruiyi (史芮伊)	C (Reserve)	F (Back Seat)	57	37	39	53	54	55	Eliminated		
Hey Hou Media (嘿吼传媒)	Zhong Xin (钟欣)	F (Back Seat)	F (Back Seat)	66	42	15	50	41	36	Eliminated		
Huace Pictures (华策影业)	Li Jiajie (Note: Former contestant on Lady Bees (Chinese: 《蜜蜂少女队》; pinyin: Mìfēng Shàonǚ Duì) (March–May 2016)) (李佳洁)	F (Back Seat)	B (Main)	79	88	88	Eliminated					
Huayi Brothers (华谊兄弟聚星)	Bian Ka (卞卡)	F (Back Seat)	F (Back Seat)	41	44	31	54	53	53	Eliminated		
Huayi Brothers (华谊兄弟聚星)	Ding Shiyu (丁诗妤)	F (Back Seat)	F (Back Seat)	69	64	67	Eliminated					
Huayi Brothers (华谊兄弟聚星)	Huang Ruoyuan (黄若元)	F (Back Seat)	C (Reserve)	82	94	96	Eliminated					
Huayi Brothers (华谊兄弟聚星)	Wen Jie (文婕)	F (Back Seat)	C (Reserve)	73	76	69	Eliminated					
Huayi Brothers (华谊兄弟聚星)	Xie Anshi (谢安诗)	F (Back Seat)	F (Back Seat)	89	97	97	Eliminated					
Huaying Entertainment (华影艺星)	Nene/Zheng Naixin (Note: Former member of Thai girl group MilkShake (Thai: มิลค์เชก) (2015–2016)) (郑乃馨)	A (Priority)	B (Main)	4	3	3	3	2	2	7	5	5
Jaywalk Newjoy (嘉行传媒)	Ao Xinyi (敖心仪)	F (Back Seat)	A (Priority)	11	15	17	42	44	37	Eliminated		
Jaywalk Newjoy (嘉行传媒)	Cui Wenmeixiu (Note: Former trainee at JYP Entertainment) (崔文美秀)	F (Back Seat)	B (Main)	50	48	36	51	52	48	Eliminated		
Jaywalk Newjoy (嘉行传媒)	Feng Wanhe (冯琬贺)	F (Back Seat)	B (Main)	72	46	16	30	33	40	Eliminated		
Jaywalk Newjoy (嘉行传媒)	Liu Meng (刘梦)	F (Back Seat)	F (Back Seat)	10	13	13	20	20	20	10	15	14
Jaywalk Newjoy (嘉行传媒)	Tian Jingfan (田京凡)	F (Back Seat)	C (Reserve)	39	43	52	16	18	27	20	19	Eliminated
Jaywalk Newjoy (嘉行传媒)	Wang Yijin (王艺瑾)	F (Back Seat)	B (Main)	7	7	7	7	7	7	2	3	3
Jinhe Media (津禾传媒)	Wu Yalu (伍雅露)	B (Main)	C (Reserve)	48	38	29	28	19	17	8	11	15
Le Teng Performing Arts (乐腾演艺)	Joyce Chu/Zhu Zhu'ai (朱主爱)	C (Reserve)	B (Main)	22	14	14	22	28	33	11	8	9
L.Tao Entertainment (龙韬娱乐)	Xu Yiyang (Note: Former contestant on The Next Top Bang (October 2018 – January 2019)) (Note: Previously debuted (January 2019) as a member of the project group Legal High (Chinese: 嗨战队; pinyin: Hāi Zhànduì), formed from the final survivors of the girls' team on The Next Top Bang) (徐艺洋)	C (Reserve)	B (Main)	15	11	9	8	8	8	4	6	8
The Voice of Dream (梦响强音)	Curley Gao/Xilinnayi Gao (Note: Former contestant on Sing! China (July–October 2017)) (希林娜依·高)	F (Back Seat)	A (Priority)	1	1	1	1	1	1	3	2	1
Nahan Culture (呐喊文化)	Lu Xinwei (吕欣蔚)	F (Back Seat)	C (Reserve)	100	92	86	Eliminated					
Nahan Culture (呐喊文化)	Pang Xueqian (庞雪倩)	F (Back Seat)	C (Reserve)	101	67	77	Eliminated					
Nahan Culture (呐喊文化)	Wang Ke (王柯)	F (Back Seat)	C (Reserve)	78	23	26	18	27	32	19	14	13
Nahan Culture (呐喊文化)	Zhang Chunru (张纯如)	F (Back Seat)	C (Reserve)	98	91	89	Eliminated					
Nok Media (诺心传媒)	Zhang Yazhuo (张雅卓)	C (Reserve)	B (Main)	71	36	40	55	55	54	Eliminated		
Qigu Culture (齐鼓文化)	Li Yulu (李雨露)	F (Back Seat)	C (Reserve)	97	72	84	Eliminated					
Qigu Culture (齐鼓文化)	Lin Jiahui (林嘉慧)	F (Back Seat)	B (Main)	53	51	61	Eliminated					
Qigu Culture (齐鼓文化)	Tan Sihui (谭思慧)	F (Back Seat)	C (Reserve)	94	70	83	Eliminated					
Qigu Culture (齐鼓文化)	Wu Miaoyin (吴妙茵)	F (Back Seat)	C (Reserve)	88	66	82	Eliminated					
Qiwu Entertainment (齐舞娱乐)	Li Zimeng (李紫梦)	A (Priority)	B (Main)	30	40	50	44	40	41	Eliminated		
Soundnova Culture (声曜文化)	Xie Anran (谢安然)	B (Main)	F (Back Seat)	17	18	20	17	24	29	17	21	Eliminated
TF Entertainment (时代峰峻)	Zhang Yifan (Note: Former contestant on Dance Smash (October 2019)) (张艺凡)	F (Back Seat)	C (Reserve)	5	5	4	4	5	5	9	9	7
Shanghai Star48 Culture Media Group SNH48 (丝芭传媒)	Chen Ke (陈珂)	C (Reserve)	C (Reserve)	23	20	18	24	16	21	31	31	Eliminated
Shanghai Star48 Culture Media Group SNH48 (丝芭传媒)	Chen Qiannan (陈倩楠)	C (Reserve)	C (Reserve)	19	21	34	26	25	19	24	25	Eliminated
Shanghai Star48 Culture Media Group SNH48 (丝芭传媒)	Huang Enru (黄恩茹)	C (Reserve)	C (Reserve)	36	32	46	32	42	38	Eliminated		
Shanghai Star48 Culture Media Group SNH48 (丝芭传媒)	Li Jia'en (李佳恩)	C (Reserve)	C (Reserve)	32	33	41	37	35	35	32	32	Eliminated
Shanghai Star48 Culture Media Group SNH48 (丝芭传媒)	Ma Yuling (马玉灵)	C (Reserve)	F (Back Seat)	25	35	44	46	46	46	Eliminated		
Shanghai Star48 Culture Media Group SNH48 (丝芭传媒)	Sun Zhenni (孙珍妮)	C (Reserve)	C (Reserve)	18	17	19	25	11	11	16	18	Eliminated
Shanghai Star48 Culture Media Group SNH48 (丝芭传媒)	Zhao Yue (Note: Member of Chinese girl group 7Senses) (赵粤)	C (Reserve)	C (Reserve)	12	10	10	6	4	4	1	1	2
Shangyue Culture AKB48 Team SH (尚越文化)	Liu Nian (Note: Former contestant on Produce 101 China (April–June 2018)) (刘念)	C (Reserve)	C (Reserve)	28	27	30	21	21	24	12	10	12
Shangyue Culture AKB48 Team SH (尚越文化)	Wan Fangzhou (万芳舟)	C (Reserve)	C (Reserve)	74	58	58	Eliminated					
Shangyue Culture AKB48 Team SH (尚越文化)	Wang Yuduo (王雨朵)	C (Reserve)	F (Back Seat)	67	73	68	Eliminated					
Shangyue Culture AKB48 Team SH (尚越文化)	Zhu Ling (朱苓)	C (Reserve)	C (Reserve)	54	53	51	52	47	47	Eliminated		
ETM Skies (ETM活力时代)	Su Ruiqi (Note: Member of Chinese girl group Chic Chili (Chinese: 西可西丽; pinyin: Xīkě Xīlì)) (苏芮琪)	B (Main)	A (Priority)	13	12	12	11	13	13	18	13	11
Top One Culture (拓普腕文化)	Gao Zhi (高直)	F (Back Seat)	B (Main)	16	22	48	49	49	49	Eliminated		
Top One Culture (拓普腕文化)	Liu Shiqi (刘诗琦)	F (Back Seat)	F (Back Seat)	60	84	90	Eliminated					
Top One Culture (拓普腕文化)	Xie Yingjun (谢樱俊)	F (Back Seat)	F (Back Seat)	68	89	92	Eliminated					
Top One Culture (拓普腕文化)	Zhao Tian'ai (赵天爱)	F (Back Seat)	F (Back Seat)	99	96	98	Eliminated					
Attitude Music (态度音乐)	Sun Lulu (孙露鹭)	B (Main)	C (Reserve)	85	95	95	Eliminated					
TH Entertainment (天浩盛世)	Chen Zhuoxuan (Note: Former contestant on Super Girl 2016 (Chinese: 《超级女声》; pinyin: Chāojí Nǚshēng)) (陈卓璇)	A (Priority)	C (Reserve)	2	2	2	2	3	3	5	4	4
TH Entertainment (天浩盛世)	Hu Jiaxin (胡嘉欣)	B (Main)	B (Main)	24	19	22	14	14	16	28	28	Eliminated
TH Entertainment (天浩盛世)	Hu Ma'er/Dilhumar Khalif (胡玛尔/迪丽胡玛尔·哈力甫)	B (Main)	C (Reserve)	42	41	38	27	26	31	33	34	Eliminated
TH Entertainment (天浩盛世)	Jiang Dan (姜丹)	B (Main)	F (Back Seat)	52	57	65	Eliminated					
TH Entertainment (天浩盛世)	Zeng Xueyao (曾雪瑶)	B (Main)	A (Priority)	34	26	23	23	22	22	30	30	Eliminated
TH Entertainment (天浩盛世)	Zhang Xinmei (张欣媚)	B (Main)	F (Back Seat)	58	63	62	Eliminated					
EE-Media (天娱传媒)	Miao Jing'ou (妙静鸥)	B (Main)	B (Main)	46	54	55	45	45	42	Eliminated		
Vinida Entertainment (万立达娱乐)	Hua Chengyan (华承妍)	F (Back Seat)	C (Reserve)	20	31	37	41	32	23	15	20	Eliminated
W.M. Media (未美文化)	Sun Ruyun (孙如云)	B (Main)	F (Back Seat)	47	56	57 (Audit)	47 (Note: Audience picked one of three Audit trainees to save)	38	43	Eliminated		
Banana Culture (香蕉娱乐)	Huang Biyin (黄碧茵)	C (Reserve)	C (Reserve)	56	65	74	Eliminated					
Banana Culture (香蕉娱乐)	Ji Yangliu (Note: Former contestant on The Coming One (Season 3) – Girls (Chinese: 《明日之子 水晶时代》; pinyin: Míngrì Zhīzǐ Shuǐjīng Shídài; lit. 'Tomorrow's Son: Crystal Age') (June–August 2019)) (吉扬柳)	C (Reserve)	B (Main)	21	25	33	38	43	45	Eliminated		
Banana Culture (香蕉娱乐)	Li Baoyi (李保怡)	C (Reserve)	B (Main)	62	68	76	Eliminated					
Banana Culture (香蕉娱乐)	Li Mengqi (李梦琦)	C (Reserve)	C (Reserve)	33	30	32	36	34	30	25	26	Eliminated
NewStyle Media (新湃传媒)	Blair/Wang Yiqiao (Note: Competed in Produce 101 China under the name Wang Yue (王玥)) (王一桥)	B (Main)	F (Back Seat)	29	24	27	33	23	15	21	17	Eliminated
Big Picture Universal (星映环球)	Hu Yanan (胡娅楠)	F (Back Seat)	F (Back Seat)	92	98	101	Eliminated					
Younger Culture (亚歌文化)	Chen Yujin (陈俞瑾)	F (Back Seat)	F (Back Seat)	83	75	60	Eliminated					
Turn East Media (意汇传媒)	Lin Junyi (林君怡)	A (Priority)	A (Priority)	6	8	8	9	10	10	13	12	10
Emperor Entertainment (英皇娱乐)	Ma Sihui (马思惠)	F (Back Seat)	C (Reserve)	26	28	49	39	29	25	27	24	Eliminated
Yongxuan Culture (咏絮文化)	Zhang Qing (张清)	F (Back Seat)	C (Reserve)	38	50	45	29	31	18	29	29	Eliminated
Yumi Entertainment (优米娱乐)	Yuan Jiayi (袁嘉艺)	B (Main)	F (Back Seat)	63	69	59	Eliminated					
Yu Heng Star Theater (玉衡星场)	Tu Zhiying (屠芷莹)	B (Main)	B (Main)	49	62	53	35	39	44	Eliminated		
Joy Pictures (卓然影业)	Yao Hui (姚慧)	A (Priority)	F (Back Seat)	9	9	11	15	12	12	23	23	Eliminated
Asian Idol Factory (AIF娱乐)	Li Huiyu (李惠玉)	F (Back Seat)	F (Back Seat)	77	85	73	Eliminated					
Asian Idol Factory (AIF娱乐)	Song Yumiao (宋宇苗)	F (Back Seat)	F (Back Seat)	80	83	87	Eliminated					
Asian Idol Factory (AIF娱乐)	Wang Jingxian (王靖贤)	F (Back Seat)	C (Reserve)	84	90	91	Eliminated					
Asian Idol Factory (AIF娱乐)	Wei Qianni (Note: Former member of Chinese girl group 1931 (2015–2017)) (卫倩妮)	F (Back Seat)	B (Main)	81	86	81	Eliminated					
Asian Idol Factory (AIF娱乐)	Xu Xiaohan (Note: Former member of Korean girl group D.Holic (2014–2017)) (许潇晗)	F (Back Seat)	B (Main)	31	34	25	12	15	14	14	16	Eliminated
Papitube	Zhang Xinwen (张馨文)	B (Main)	B (Main)	14	16	21	34	36	39	Eliminated		
SDT Entertainment	Li Man (鹂蔓)	C (Reserve)	B (Main)	91	81	71	Eliminated					
SDT Entertainment	Shu Yiling (舒一灵)	C (Reserve)	A (Priority)	90	78	64	Eliminated					
SDT Entertainment	Wang Xiyao (王曦瑶)	C (Reserve)	F (Back Seat)	86	79	70 (Audit)	70 (Audit)	Eliminated				
SDT Entertainment	Zeng Shuyan (曾淑岩)	C (Reserve)	B (Main)	76	74	63	Eliminated					
SDT Entertainment	Zhang Xinyun (张馨允)	C (Reserve)	B (Main)	55	71	66	Eliminated					
TOP CLASS Entertainment (TOP CLASS 娱乐)	Huang Yuqing (黄雨晴)	F (Back Seat)	B (Main)	96	101	100	Eliminated					
TOP CLASS Entertainment (TOP CLASS 娱乐)	Shen Xiaoting (沈小婷)	F (Back Seat)	B (Main)	64	87	80	Eliminated					
TOP CLASS Entertainment (TOP CLASS 娱乐)	Wen Xin (温馨)	F (Back Seat)	B (Main)	95	100	99	Eliminated					
TOP CLASS Entertainment (TOP CLASS 娱乐)	Zhou Yulin (周雨霖)	F (Back Seat)	F (Back Seat)	93	99	94	Eliminated					
