= Produce Camp 2020 =

Chinese girl group competition show

- Also known as: CHUANG 2020

Chinese name
- Simplified Chinese: 创造营 2020
- Traditional Chinese: 創造營 2020
- Hanyu Pinyin: Chuàngzàoyíng Èrlíng èrlíng
- Genre: Reality, Survival Competition
- Created by: CJ E&M
- Developed by: Tencent
- Starring: Huang Zitao; Lu Han; Victoria Song; Mao Buyi
- Judges: "Citizen Producers" (Viewers)
- Announcer: 何雁南 (pinyin: Hé Yànnán)
- Ending theme: 《你最最最重要》 (pinyin: Nǐ zuìzuìzuì zhòngyào; lit. 'You [Are] The Most Most Most Important') (You Are Everything To Me)
- Country of origin: China
- Original languages: Chinese; Mandarin
- No. of episodes: 10

Production
- Production locations: Shenzhen, Guangdong
- Camera setup: Multi-camera
- Production companies: Hao Feng Qingyun; CJ E&M; Tencent Penguin Pictures

Original release
- Network: Tencent Video
- Release: May 2 – July 4, 2020

Related
- Produce 101; Produce 101 China; Produce Camp 2019; Produce Camp 2021; Produce Camp Asia: Thailand

Produce Camp 2020 (Chinese: 《创造营2020》; pinyin: Chuàngzàoyíng Èrlíng èrlíng), officially known as CHUANG 2020, is a Chinese girl group reality competition show, which premiered on Tencent Video on May 2, 2020 as the third season of Produce 101 China. It is also the only edition in the series to only have 7 winning contestants, instead of the usual 11. On July 4, 2020, the final seven contestants debuted as BonBon Girls 303 (Chinese: 硬糖少女303; pinyin: Yìngtáng Shàonǚ Sānlíngsān; lit. 'Hard Candy Girls 303').

== Background ==
The program gathers 101 female trainees, letting them grow and improve through missions, training, and assessments, under the leadership and guidance of the 4 celebrity mentors and a series of guest mentors. In the end, the top 7 trainees will form a girl group and debut to the public.

Like in Produce Camp 2019, during the first performance assessment by the mentors, the trainees are divided into four classes (instead of five), which are equivalent to A, B, C, and F (but no D). This season, they are named "Priority Seats" (Chinese: 首发成团位; pinyin: Shǒufā chéng tuán wèi; lit. 'First-release group-forming seats'), "Main Team" (Chinese: 主力队; pinyin: Zhǔlì duì), "Reserve Team" (Chinese: 预备队; pinyin: Yùbèi duì), and "Back Seats" (Chinese: 板凳队; pinyin: Bǎndèng duì; lit. 'Bench Team').

== Mentors ==
- Huang Zitao
- Lu Han
- Victoria Song (Note: Former judge on The Next Top Bang (October 2018 – January 2019))
- Mao Buyi (Note: Former judge on The Coming One (Season 3) – Girls (Chinese: 《明日之子 水晶时代》; lit. 'Tomorrow's Son: Crystal Age') (June–August 2019))

=== Special Mentors ===
- Kris Wu
- Qin Hailu

== Contestants ==
=== Top 7 ===
Rank	Episode 2	Episode 3	Episode 4	Episode 5	Episode 6	Episode 7	Episode 8	Episode 9	Episode 10
1	Curley Gao/Xilinnayi Gao (希林娜依·高)	Curley Gao/Xilinnayi Gao (希林娜依·高)	Curley Gao/Xilinnayi Gao (希林娜依·高)	Curley Gao/Xilinnayi Gao (希林娜依·高)	Curley Gao/Xilinnayi Gao (希林娜依·高)	Curley Gao/Xilinnayi Gao (希林娜依·高)	Zhao Yue (赵粤)	Zhao Yue (赵粤)	Curley Gao/Xilinnayi Gao (希林娜依·高)
2	Chen Zhuoxuan (陈卓璇)	Chen Zhuoxuan (陈卓璇)	Chen Zhuoxuan (陈卓璇)	Chen Zhuoxuan (陈卓璇)	Nene/Zheng Naixin (郑乃馨)	Nene/Zheng Naixin (郑乃馨)	Wang Yijin (王艺瑾)	Curley Gao/Xilinnayi Gao (希林娜依·高)	Zhao Yue (赵粤)
3	Sally/Liu Xiening (刘些宁)	Nene/Zheng Naixin (郑乃馨)	Nene/Zheng Naixin (郑乃馨)	Nene/Zheng Naixin (郑乃馨)	Chen Zhuoxuan (陈卓璇)	Chen Zhuoxuan (陈卓璇)	Curley Gao/Xilinnayi Gao (希林娜依·高)	Wang Yijin (王艺瑾)	Wang Yijin (王艺瑾)
4	Nene/Zheng Naixin (郑乃馨)	Sally/Liu Xiening (刘些宁)	Zhang Yifan (张艺凡)	Zhang Yifan (张艺凡)	Zhao Yue (赵粤)	Zhao Yue (赵粤)	Xu Yiyang (徐艺洋)	Chen Zhuoxuan (陈卓璇)	Chen Zhuoxuan (陈卓璇)
5	Zhang Yifan (张艺凡)	Zhang Yifan (张艺凡)	Sally/Liu Xiening (刘些宁)	Sally/Liu Xiening (刘些宁)	Zhang Yifan (张艺凡)	Zhang Yifan (张艺凡)	Chen Zhuoxuan (陈卓璇)	Nene/Zheng Naixin (郑乃馨)	Nene/Zheng Naixin (郑乃馨)
6	Lin Junyi (林君怡)	Jiang Zhenyu (姜贞羽)	Jiang Zhenyu (姜贞羽)	Zhao Yue (赵粤)	Sally/Liu Xiening (刘些宁)	Sally/Liu Xiening (刘些宁)	Sally/Liu Xiening (刘些宁)	Xu Yiyang (徐艺洋)	Sally/Liu Xiening (刘些宁)
7	Wang Yijin (王艺瑾)	Wang Yijin (王艺瑾)	Wang Yijin (王艺瑾)	Wang Yijin (王艺瑾)	Wang Yijin (王艺瑾)	Wang Yijin (王艺瑾)	Nene/Zheng Naixin (郑乃馨)	Sally/Liu Xiening (刘些宁)	Zhang Yifan (张艺凡)

=== Result ===
The finale was held on July 4, 2020, and was broadcast live. The final seven members debuted as BonBon Girls 303 (Chinese: 硬糖少女303; pinyin: Yìngtáng Shàonǚ Sānlíngsān; lit. 'Hard Candy Girls 303').

#	Episode 10 (Total votes)		
#	Name	Votes	Company
1	Curley Gao/Xilinnayi Gao (希林娜依·高)	251,110,993	The Voice of Dream (梦响强音)
2	Zhao Yue (赵粤)	180,117,595	Shanghai Star48 Culture Media Group SNH48 (丝芭传媒)
3	Wang Yijin (王艺瑾)	147,605,682	Jaywalk Newjoy (嘉行传媒)
4	Chen Zhuoxuan (陈卓璇)	145,019,245	TH Entertainment (天浩盛世)
5	Nene/Zheng Naixin (郑乃馨)	125,278,972	Huaying Entertainment (华影艺星)
6	Sally/Liu Xiening (刘些宁)	93,272,515	Hot Idol (好好榜样)
7	Zhang Yifan (张艺凡)	91,588,994	TF Entertainment (时代峰峻)

== Missions ==
=== Mission 1: Group Battle ===
Color key

- Winning Group
- Center/Leader

#	Team	Original artist(s)	Song	Team members	Number of group votes (Note: Votes are calculated from members of senior groups, Rocket Girls 101 & R1SE, and special mentor, Kris Wu.)
1	LTG (Lu Han and Huang Zitao)	Cyndi Wang	Honey	Nene/Zheng Naixin	20
1	LTG (Lu Han and Huang Zitao)	Cyndi Wang	Honey	Bian Ka	20
1	LTG (Lu Han and Huang Zitao)	Cyndi Wang	Honey	Huang Enru	20
1	LTG (Lu Han and Huang Zitao)	Cyndi Wang	Honey	Wan Fangzhou	20
1	LTG (Lu Han and Huang Zitao)	Cyndi Wang	Honey	Wu Yalu	20
1	LTG (Lu Han and Huang Zitao)	Cyndi Wang	Honey	Zhang Yifan	20
1	LTG (Lu Han and Huang Zitao)	Cyndi Wang	Honey	Zhao Tianai	20
1	Bu Song (不宋) (Mao Buyi and Victoria Song)	Zhang Qiang	手扶拖拉机斯基 (Tractor Sky)	Jiang Dan	1
1	Bu Song (不宋) (Mao Buyi and Victoria Song)	Zhang Qiang	手扶拖拉机斯基 (Tractor Sky)	Li Baoyi	1
1	Bu Song (不宋) (Mao Buyi and Victoria Song)	Zhang Qiang	手扶拖拉机斯基 (Tractor Sky)	Lin Jiahui	1
1	Bu Song (不宋) (Mao Buyi and Victoria Song)	Zhang Qiang	手扶拖拉机斯基 (Tractor Sky)	Ma Yuling	1
1	Bu Song (不宋) (Mao Buyi and Victoria Song)	Zhang Qiang	手扶拖拉机斯基 (Tractor Sky)	Wang Lina	1
1	Bu Song (不宋) (Mao Buyi and Victoria Song)	Zhang Qiang	手扶拖拉机斯基 (Tractor Sky)	Wen Jie	1
2	LTG (Lu Han and Huang Zitao)	Jolin Tsai	招牌动作 (Signature Move)	Sally/Liu Xiening	5
2	LTG (Lu Han and Huang Zitao)	Jolin Tsai	招牌动作 (Signature Move)	Hua Chengyan	5
2	LTG (Lu Han and Huang Zitao)	Jolin Tsai	招牌动作 (Signature Move)	Li Mengqi	5
2	LTG (Lu Han and Huang Zitao)	Jolin Tsai	招牌动作 (Signature Move)	Li Zimeng	5
2	LTG (Lu Han and Huang Zitao)	Jolin Tsai	招牌动作 (Signature Move)	Wang Ke	5
2	LTG (Lu Han and Huang Zitao)	Jolin Tsai	招牌动作 (Signature Move)	Xu Yiyang	5
2	LTG (Lu Han and Huang Zitao)	Jolin Tsai	招牌动作 (Signature Move)	Zeng Shuyan	5
2	Bu Song (不宋) (Mao Buyi and Victoria Song)	Elva Hsiao	潇洒小姐 (Ms Chic)	Zeng Xueyao	16
2	Bu Song (不宋) (Mao Buyi and Victoria Song)	Elva Hsiao	潇洒小姐 (Ms Chic)	Ao Xinyi	16
2	Bu Song (不宋) (Mao Buyi and Victoria Song)	Elva Hsiao	潇洒小姐 (Ms Chic)	Jiang Zhenyu	16
2	Bu Song (不宋) (Mao Buyi and Victoria Song)	Elva Hsiao	潇洒小姐 (Ms Chic)	Lin Junyi	16
2	Bu Song (不宋) (Mao Buyi and Victoria Song)	Elva Hsiao	潇洒小姐 (Ms Chic)	Shu Yiling	16
2	Bu Song (不宋) (Mao Buyi and Victoria Song)	Elva Hsiao	潇洒小姐 (Ms Chic)	Su Ruiqi	16
2	Bu Song (不宋) (Mao Buyi and Victoria Song)	Elva Hsiao	潇洒小姐 (Ms Chic)	Curley Gao/Xilinnayi Gao	16
3	LTG (Lu Han and Huang Zitao)	Kris Wu	大碗宽面 (Big Bowl Thick Noodles)	Tu Zhiying	20
3	LTG (Lu Han and Huang Zitao)	Kris Wu	大碗宽面 (Big Bowl Thick Noodles)	Chen Ke	20
3	LTG (Lu Han and Huang Zitao)	Kris Wu	大碗宽面 (Big Bowl Thick Noodles)	Chen Roubing	20
3	LTG (Lu Han and Huang Zitao)	Kris Wu	大碗宽面 (Big Bowl Thick Noodles)	Li Huiyu	20
3	LTG (Lu Han and Huang Zitao)	Kris Wu	大碗宽面 (Big Bowl Thick Noodles)	Song Yumiao	20
3	LTG (Lu Han and Huang Zitao)	Kris Wu	大碗宽面 (Big Bowl Thick Noodles)	Sun Lulu	20
3	LTG (Lu Han and Huang Zitao)	Kris Wu	大碗宽面 (Big Bowl Thick Noodles)	Wei Qianni	20
3	Bu Song (不宋) (Mao Buyi and Victoria Song)	Sihan (李思瀚)	窒息 (Suffocated)	Lana	1
3	Bu Song (不宋) (Mao Buyi and Victoria Song)	Sihan (李思瀚)	窒息 (Suffocated)	Huang Ruoyuan	1
3	Bu Song (不宋) (Mao Buyi and Victoria Song)	Sihan (李思瀚)	窒息 (Suffocated)	Li Jiajie	1
3	Bu Song (不宋) (Mao Buyi and Victoria Song)	Sihan (李思瀚)	窒息 (Suffocated)	Lu Xinwei	1
3	Bu Song (不宋) (Mao Buyi and Victoria Song)	Sihan (李思瀚)	窒息 (Suffocated)	Meng Huan	1
3	Bu Song (不宋) (Mao Buyi and Victoria Song)	Sihan (李思瀚)	窒息 (Suffocated)	Zhang Qing	1
4	LTG (Lu Han and Huang Zitao)	Stefanie Sun	神奇 (Magical)	Wang Yijin	1
4	LTG (Lu Han and Huang Zitao)	Stefanie Sun	神奇 (Magical)	Gao Zhi	1
4	LTG (Lu Han and Huang Zitao)	Stefanie Sun	神奇 (Magical)	Ji Yangliu	1
4	LTG (Lu Han and Huang Zitao)	Stefanie Sun	神奇 (Magical)	Pan Xiaoxue	1
4	LTG (Lu Han and Huang Zitao)	Stefanie Sun	神奇 (Magical)	Pang Xueqian	1
4	LTG (Lu Han and Huang Zitao)	Stefanie Sun	神奇 (Magical)	Zhang Xinyun	1
4	LTG (Lu Han and Huang Zitao)	Stefanie Sun	神奇 (Magical)	Zhao Yue	1
4	Bu Song (不宋) (Mao Buyi and Victoria Song)	Ikimono-gakari	青鸟 (Blue Bird)	Huang Yuqing	20
4	Bu Song (不宋) (Mao Buyi and Victoria Song)	Ikimono-gakari	青鸟 (Blue Bird)	Huang Biyin	20
4	Bu Song (不宋) (Mao Buyi and Victoria Song)	Ikimono-gakari	青鸟 (Blue Bird)	Li Man	20
4	Bu Song (不宋) (Mao Buyi and Victoria Song)	Ikimono-gakari	青鸟 (Blue Bird)	Ma Sihui	20
4	Bu Song (不宋) (Mao Buyi and Victoria Song)	Ikimono-gakari	青鸟 (Blue Bird)	Wang Jingxian	20
4	Bu Song (不宋) (Mao Buyi and Victoria Song)	Ikimono-gakari	青鸟 (Blue Bird)	Zhang Yazhuo	20
4	Bu Song (不宋) (Mao Buyi and Victoria Song)	Ikimono-gakari	青鸟 (Blue Bird)	Winnie Zhong/Zhong Feifei	20
5	LTG (Lu Han and Huang Zitao)	Marian Hill	One time	Bi Shaoyan	10
5	LTG (Lu Han and Huang Zitao)	Marian Hill	One time	Chen Qiannan	10
5	LTG (Lu Han and Huang Zitao)	Marian Hill	One time	Li Jiaen	10
5	LTG (Lu Han and Huang Zitao)	Marian Hill	One time	Liu Yulu	10
5	LTG (Lu Han and Huang Zitao)	Marian Hill	One time	Wen Xin	10
5	LTG (Lu Han and Huang Zitao)	Marian Hill	One time	Xu Xiaohan	10
5	LTG (Lu Han and Huang Zitao)	Marian Hill	One time	Zhang Xinmei	10
5	Bu Song (不宋) (Mao Buyi and Victoria Song)	High4/IU	除了爱情春天和樱花 (Apart from Spring, Love and Cherry Blossoms)	Joyce Chu/Zhu Zhuai	11
5	Bu Song (不宋) (Mao Buyi and Victoria Song)	High4/IU	除了爱情春天和樱花 (Apart from Spring, Love and Cherry Blossoms)	Chen Zhuoxuan	11
5	Bu Song (不宋) (Mao Buyi and Victoria Song)	High4/IU	除了爱情春天和樱花 (Apart from Spring, Love and Cherry Blossoms)	Cui Wenmeixiu	11
5	Bu Song (不宋) (Mao Buyi and Victoria Song)	High4/IU	除了爱情春天和樱花 (Apart from Spring, Love and Cherry Blossoms)	Hu Jiaxin	11
5	Bu Song (不宋) (Mao Buyi and Victoria Song)	High4/IU	除了爱情春天和樱花 (Apart from Spring, Love and Cherry Blossoms)	Hu Ma'er	11
5	Bu Song (不宋) (Mao Buyi and Victoria Song)	High4/IU	除了爱情春天和樱花 (Apart from Spring, Love and Cherry Blossoms)	Shi Ruiyi	11
5	Bu Song (不宋) (Mao Buyi and Victoria Song)	High4/IU	除了爱情春天和樱花 (Apart from Spring, Love and Cherry Blossoms)	Wang Xiyao	11
6	LTG (Lu Han and Huang Zitao)	Wang Chaofan (汪超凡)	随便 (Whatever)	Zhong Xin	14
6	LTG (Lu Han and Huang Zitao)	Wang Chaofan (汪超凡)	随便 (Whatever)	Chen Xinye	14
6	LTG (Lu Han and Huang Zitao)	Wang Chaofan (汪超凡)	随便 (Whatever)	Hu Yanan	14
6	LTG (Lu Han and Huang Zitao)	Wang Chaofan (汪超凡)	随便 (Whatever)	Li Chengxi	14
6	LTG (Lu Han and Huang Zitao)	Wang Chaofan (汪超凡)	随便 (Whatever)	Tan Sihui	14
6	LTG (Lu Han and Huang Zitao)	Wang Chaofan (汪超凡)	随便 (Whatever)	Xie Anshi	14
6	Bu Song (不宋) (Mao Buyi and Victoria Song)	Wakin Chau	刀剑如梦 (A Life of Fighting is But A Dream)	Liu Shiqi	7
6	Bu Song (不宋) (Mao Buyi and Victoria Song)	Wakin Chau	刀剑如梦 (A Life of Fighting is But A Dream)	Li Yulu	7
6	Bu Song (不宋) (Mao Buyi and Victoria Song)	Wakin Chau	刀剑如梦 (A Life of Fighting is But A Dream)	Miao Jingou	7
6	Bu Song (不宋) (Mao Buyi and Victoria Song)	Wakin Chau	刀剑如梦 (A Life of Fighting is But A Dream)	Shen Xiaoting	7
6	Bu Song (不宋) (Mao Buyi and Victoria Song)	Wakin Chau	刀剑如梦 (A Life of Fighting is But A Dream)	Wang Yiqiao	7
6	Bu Song (不宋) (Mao Buyi and Victoria Song)	Wakin Chau	刀剑如梦 (A Life of Fighting is But A Dream)	Yu Ziyu	7
6	Bu Song (不宋) (Mao Buyi and Victoria Song)	Wakin Chau	刀剑如梦 (A Life of Fighting is But A Dream)	Zhang Chunru	7
7	LTG (Lu Han and Huang Zitao)	Teresa Teng	甜蜜蜜 (Sweet as Honey)	Tian Jingfan	17
7	LTG (Lu Han and Huang Zitao)	Teresa Teng	甜蜜蜜 (Sweet as Honey)	Feng Wanhe	17
7	LTG (Lu Han and Huang Zitao)	Teresa Teng	甜蜜蜜 (Sweet as Honey)	Kang Xi	17
7	LTG (Lu Han and Huang Zitao)	Teresa Teng	甜蜜蜜 (Sweet as Honey)	Wu Miaoyin	17
7	LTG (Lu Han and Huang Zitao)	Teresa Teng	甜蜜蜜 (Sweet as Honey)	Zhang Xinwen	17
7	LTG (Lu Han and Huang Zitao)	Teresa Teng	甜蜜蜜 (Sweet as Honey)	Zhou Yulin	17
7	Bu Song (不宋) (Mao Buyi and Victoria Song)	Wowkie Zhang	哈鹿哈鹿哈鹿 (Ha Lu Ha Lu Ha Lu)	Liu Nian	3
7	Bu Song (不宋) (Mao Buyi and Victoria Song)	Wowkie Zhang	哈鹿哈鹿哈鹿 (Ha Lu Ha Lu Ha Lu)	Ding Shiyu	3
7	Bu Song (不宋) (Mao Buyi and Victoria Song)	Wowkie Zhang	哈鹿哈鹿哈鹿 (Ha Lu Ha Lu Ha Lu)	Sun Zhenni	3
7	Bu Song (不宋) (Mao Buyi and Victoria Song)	Wowkie Zhang	哈鹿哈鹿哈鹿 (Ha Lu Ha Lu Ha Lu)	Wang Yuduo	3
7	Bu Song (不宋) (Mao Buyi and Victoria Song)	Wowkie Zhang	哈鹿哈鹿哈鹿 (Ha Lu Ha Lu Ha Lu)	Wu Xiaoning	3
7	Bu Song (不宋) (Mao Buyi and Victoria Song)	Wowkie Zhang	哈鹿哈鹿哈鹿 (Ha Lu Ha Lu Ha Lu)	Yu Yangzi	3
7	Bu Song (不宋) (Mao Buyi and Victoria Song)	Wowkie Zhang	哈鹿哈鹿哈鹿 (Ha Lu Ha Lu Ha Lu)	Zhu Ling	3
8	Special stage (Note: Group formed by mentors, consisting of the bottom seven trainees. The group had to first prove that they should be given the opportunity to perform on stage.)	TFBoys	加油! AMIGO (Fighting! AMIGO)	Liu Meng	N/A
8	Special stage	TFBoys	加油! AMIGO (Fighting! AMIGO)	Chen Yujin	N/A
8	Special stage	TFBoys	加油! AMIGO (Fighting! AMIGO)	Sun Ruyun	N/A
8	Special stage	TFBoys	加油! AMIGO (Fighting! AMIGO)	Xie Anran	N/A
8	Special stage	TFBoys	加油! AMIGO (Fighting! AMIGO)	Xie Yingjun	N/A
8	Special stage	TFBoys	加油! AMIGO (Fighting! AMIGO)	Yao Hui	N/A
8	Special stage	TFBoys	加油! AMIGO (Fighting! AMIGO)	Yuan Jiayi	N/A
9	Special stage (Note: Special performance by trainees from Wuhan. They passed all initial interviews and assessments, but could not join the Produce Camp 2020 program because of the COVID-19 Wuhan lockdown.) (MIGO TOM/哇偶文化)	Wowkie Zhang	Nezha (哪吒闹)	He Qin (何勤)	N/A
9	Special stage (MIGO TOM/哇偶文化)	Wowkie Zhang	Nezha (哪吒闹)	Luo Yang Yunzi (罗杨云子)	N/A
9	Special stage (MIGO TOM/哇偶文化)	Wowkie Zhang	Nezha (哪吒闹)	Zhang Qiuxu (张秋絮)	N/A
9	Special stage (MIGO TOM/哇偶文化)	Wowkie Zhang	Nezha (哪吒闹)	Mei Zi (梅子)	N/A
9	Special stage (MIGO TOM/哇偶文化)	Wowkie Zhang	Nezha (哪吒闹)	Wang Shuying (王姝颖)	N/A

=== Mission 2: Position Battle ===
Color key

- Winning Group
- Center/Leader
- Most Voted Trainee (Note: Trainee with the highest vote from each team becomes most voted trainee. (Voted by audience))
- Reserve Trainee (旁听者) (Note: Each center from the three chosen groups can pick a Reserve trainee to save from elimination.)

#	Position	Team	Original artist(s)	Song	Team members	Individual Votes	Total of individual votes	Best Group Votes (Note: After all performances, the audience votes again which team performance they like the best.)
1	Dance	LTG (Lu Han and Huang Zitao)	Lexie Liu	Manta	Ao Xinyi	74	431	98
1	Dance	LTG (Lu Han and Huang Zitao)	Lexie Liu	Manta	Hu Ma'er	51	431	98
1	Dance	LTG (Lu Han and Huang Zitao)	Lexie Liu	Manta	Li Zimeng	67	431	98
1	Dance	LTG (Lu Han and Huang Zitao)	Lexie Liu	Manta	Zeng Xueyao	97	431	98
1	Dance	LTG (Lu Han and Huang Zitao)	Lexie Liu	Manta	Zhang Xinwen	42	431	98
1	Dance	Bu Song (不宋) (Mao Buyi and Victoria Song)	R1SE	Don't Be Stingy (谁都别吝啬)	Chen Ke	32	221	19
1	Dance	Bu Song (不宋) (Mao Buyi and Victoria Song)	R1SE	Don't Be Stingy (谁都别吝啬)	Cui Wenmeixiu	59	221	19
1	Dance	Bu Song (不宋) (Mao Buyi and Victoria Song)	R1SE	Don't Be Stingy (谁都别吝啬)	Lana	57	221	19
1	Dance	Bu Song (不宋) (Mao Buyi and Victoria Song)	R1SE	Don't Be Stingy (谁都别吝啬)	Ma Yuling	23	221	19
1	Dance	Bu Song (不宋) (Mao Buyi and Victoria Song)	R1SE	Don't Be Stingy (谁都别吝啬)	Tu Zhiying	50	221	19
2	Dance	LTG (Lu Han and Huang Zitao)	Jolin Tsai, Namie Amuro	I'm not yours	Li Mengqi	84	318	41
2	Dance	LTG (Lu Han and Huang Zitao)	Jolin Tsai, Namie Amuro	I'm not yours	Bian Ka	9	318	41
2	Dance	LTG (Lu Han and Huang Zitao)	Jolin Tsai, Namie Amuro	I'm not yours	Li Jiaen	54	318	41
2	Dance	LTG (Lu Han and Huang Zitao)	Jolin Tsai, Namie Amuro	I'm not yours	Liu Nian	56	318	41
2	Dance	LTG (Lu Han and Huang Zitao)	Jolin Tsai, Namie Amuro	I'm not yours	Xu Xiaohan	115	318	41
2	Dance	Bu Song (不宋) (Mao Buyi and Victoria Song)	Yi Ming (一铭)	Riding My Favorite Moped (骑上我心爱的小摩托)	Lin Junyi	68	230	7
2	Dance	Bu Song (不宋) (Mao Buyi and Victoria Song)	Yi Ming (一铭)	Riding My Favorite Moped (骑上我心爱的小摩托)	Gao Zhi	64	230	7
2	Dance	Bu Song (不宋) (Mao Buyi and Victoria Song)	Yi Ming (一铭)	Riding My Favorite Moped (骑上我心爱的小摩托)	Liu Meng	44	230	7
2	Dance	Bu Song (不宋) (Mao Buyi and Victoria Song)	Yi Ming (一铭)	Riding My Favorite Moped (骑上我心爱的小摩托)	Liu Yulu	5	230	7
2	Dance	Bu Song (不宋) (Mao Buyi and Victoria Song)	Yi Ming (一铭)	Riding My Favorite Moped (骑上我心爱的小摩托)	Shi Ruiyi	49	230	7
2	Dance	Bu Song (不宋) (Mao Buyi and Victoria Song)	Yi Ming (一铭)	Riding My Favorite Moped (骑上我心爱的小摩托)	Sun Ruyun	N/A (Reserve)	230	7
3	Vocal	LTG (Lu Han and Huang Zitao)	Yida Huang	That Girl Said To Me (那女孩对我)	Chen Zhuoxuan	34	238	9
3	Vocal	LTG (Lu Han and Huang Zitao)	Yida Huang	That Girl Said To Me (那女孩对我)	Sun Zhenni	66	238	9
3	Vocal	LTG (Lu Han and Huang Zitao)	Yida Huang	That Girl Said To Me (那女孩对我)	Tian Jingfan	48	238	9
3	Vocal	LTG (Lu Han and Huang Zitao)	Yida Huang	That Girl Said To Me (那女孩对我)	Wang Ke	61	238	9
3	Vocal	LTG (Lu Han and Huang Zitao)	Yida Huang	That Girl Said To Me (那女孩对我)	Wang Lina	29	238	9
3	Dance	Bu Song (不宋) (Mao Buyi and Victoria Song)	Su Yunying	Time (时候)	Jiang Zhenyu	115	318	67
3	Dance	Bu Song (不宋) (Mao Buyi and Victoria Song)	Su Yunying	Time (时候)	Hu Jiaxin	30	318	67
3	Dance	Bu Song (不宋) (Mao Buyi and Victoria Song)	Su Yunying	Time (时候)	Kang Xi	24	318	67
3	Dance	Bu Song (不宋) (Mao Buyi and Victoria Song)	Su Yunying	Time (时候)	Sally/Liu Xiening	95	318	67
3	Dance	Bu Song (不宋) (Mao Buyi and Victoria Song)	Su Yunying	Time (时候)	Xie Anran	54	318	67
4	Vocal	LTG (Lu Han and Huang Zitao)	Landy Wen	Summer Breeze (夏天的风)	Zhang Yifan	47	179	5
4	Vocal	LTG (Lu Han and Huang Zitao)	Landy Wen	Summer Breeze (夏天的风)	Ji Yangliu	53	179	5
4	Vocal	LTG (Lu Han and Huang Zitao)	Landy Wen	Summer Breeze (夏天的风)	Yu Ziyu	14	179	5
4	Vocal	LTG (Lu Han and Huang Zitao)	Landy Wen	Summer Breeze (夏天的风)	Zhang Yazhuo	22	179	5
4	Vocal	LTG (Lu Han and Huang Zitao)	Landy Wen	Summer Breeze (夏天的风)	Zhu Ling	43	179	5
4	Vocal	Bu Song (不宋) (Mao Buyi and Victoria Song)	Diana Wang (王詩安)	Poem (一步成诗)	Miao Jingou	108	373	36
4	Vocal	Bu Song (不宋) (Mao Buyi and Victoria Song)	Diana Wang (王詩安)	Poem (一步成诗)	Feng Wanhe	31	373	36
4	Vocal	Bu Song (不宋) (Mao Buyi and Victoria Song)	Diana Wang (王詩安)	Poem (一步成诗)	Wu Yalu	58	373	36
4	Vocal	Bu Song (不宋) (Mao Buyi and Victoria Song)	Diana Wang (王詩安)	Poem (一步成诗)	Nene/Zheng Naixin	120	373	36
4	Vocal	Bu Song (不宋) (Mao Buyi and Victoria Song)	Diana Wang (王詩安)	Poem (一步成诗)	Winnie Zhong/Zhong Feifei	56	373	36
5	Vocal	LTG (Lu Han and Huang Zitao)	EXCUSE ME (打扰一下乐团)	The World Would Not Easily Collapse (世界不会轻易崩塌)	Curley Gao/Xilinnayi Gao	93	354	57
5	Vocal	LTG (Lu Han and Huang Zitao)	EXCUSE ME (打扰一下乐团)	The World Would Not Easily Collapse (世界不会轻易崩塌)	Chen Qiannan	22	354	57
5	Vocal	LTG (Lu Han and Huang Zitao)	EXCUSE ME (打扰一下乐团)	The World Would Not Easily Collapse (世界不会轻易崩塌)	Huang Enru	59	354	57
5	Vocal	LTG (Lu Han and Huang Zitao)	EXCUSE ME (打扰一下乐团)	The World Would Not Easily Collapse (世界不会轻易崩塌)	Wang Yijin	97	354	57
5	Vocal	LTG (Lu Han and Huang Zitao)	EXCUSE ME (打扰一下乐团)	The World Would Not Easily Collapse (世界不会轻易崩塌)	Zhang Qing	83	354	57
5	Composition	Bu Song (不宋) (Mao Buyi and Victoria Song)	Unreleased original song	Starlight MOU (星光备忘录)	Yao Hui	35	198	11
5	Composition	Bu Song (不宋) (Mao Buyi and Victoria Song)	Unreleased original song	Starlight MOU (星光备忘录)	Su Ruiqi	60	198	11
5	Composition	Bu Song (不宋) (Mao Buyi and Victoria Song)	Unreleased original song	Starlight MOU (星光备忘录)	Yu Yangzi	10	198	11
5	Composition	Bu Song (不宋) (Mao Buyi and Victoria Song)	Unreleased original song	Starlight MOU (星光备忘录)	Zhong Xin	59	198	11
5	Composition	Bu Song (不宋) (Mao Buyi and Victoria Song)	Unreleased original song	Starlight MOU (星光备忘录)	Joyce Chu/Zhu Zhuai	34	198	11
5	Composition	Bu Song (不宋) (Mao Buyi and Victoria Song)	Unreleased original song	Starlight MOU (星光备忘录)	Li Chengxi	N/A (Reserve)	198	11
5	Composition	Bu Song (不宋) (Mao Buyi and Victoria Song)	Unreleased original song	Starlight MOU (星光备忘录)	Wang Xiyao	N/A (Reserve)	198	11
6	Dance & Vocal	Special performance (五个小超人) (Note: Group formed by mentors. Trainees had to both dance and sing, unlike other groups which focused on only one aspect.)	Bishop Briggs	River	Zhao Yue	66	278	82
6	Dance & Vocal	Special performance (五个小超人)	Bishop Briggs	River	Hua Chengyan	35	278	82
6	Dance & Vocal	Special performance (五个小超人)	Bishop Briggs	River	Ma Sihui	67	278	82
6	Dance & Vocal	Special performance (五个小超人)	Bishop Briggs	River	Wang Yiqiao	21	278	82
6	Dance & Vocal	Special performance (五个小超人)	Bishop Briggs	River	Xu Yiyang	89	278	82

=== Mission 3: Concept Battle ===
Color key

- Winning Group
- Center/Leader (Note: The six trainees with most votes for each song automatically becomes center & leader.)
- Most Voted Trainee

#	Producer	Song	Guest Performer	Team members (Note: Jiang Zhenyu was unable to participate in the third performance due to her neck injury. She later withdrew from the competition in June 19th.)	Individual Votes	Total of individual votes	Best Team Votes
1	Gong Ge	《怪女孩》 (Miss Freak)	施柏宇 (Patrick Shih)	Xu Yiyang	114	287	78
1	Gong Ge	《怪女孩》 (Miss Freak)	施柏宇 (Patrick Shih)	Chen Ke	17	287	78
1	Gong Ge	《怪女孩》 (Miss Freak)	施柏宇 (Patrick Shih)	Lana	39	287	78
1	Gong Ge	《怪女孩》 (Miss Freak)	施柏宇 (Patrick Shih)	Xie Anran	47	287	78
1	Gong Ge	《怪女孩》 (Miss Freak)	施柏宇 (Patrick Shih)	Yao Hui	8	287	78
1	Gong Ge	《怪女孩》 (Miss Freak)	施柏宇 (Patrick Shih)	Zhang Yifan	62	287	78
2	Zheng Nan	《离群》 (Outlier)	李治廷 (Aarif Rahman/Li Zhiting)	Wang Yijin	111	286	37
2	Zheng Nan	《离群》 (Outlier)	李治廷 (Aarif Rahman/Li Zhiting)	Chen Zhuoxuan	42	286	37
2	Zheng Nan	《离群》 (Outlier)	李治廷 (Aarif Rahman/Li Zhiting)	Hua Chengyan	17	286	37
2	Zheng Nan	《离群》 (Outlier)	李治廷 (Aarif Rahman/Li Zhiting)	Lin Junyi	19	286	37
2	Zheng Nan	《离群》 (Outlier)	李治廷 (Aarif Rahman/Li Zhiting)	Ma Sihui	73	286	37
2	Zheng Nan	《离群》 (Outlier)	李治廷 (Aarif Rahman/Li Zhiting)	Zhang Qing	24	286	37
3	Da Zhangwei	《每天起来唱一遍》 (Sing It Once Every Morning)	王大陸 (Darren Wang)	Sally/Liu Xiening	78	288	12
3	Da Zhangwei	《每天起来唱一遍》 (Sing It Once Every Morning)	王大陸 (Darren Wang)	Liu Nian	20	288	12
3	Da Zhangwei	《每天起来唱一遍》 (Sing It Once Every Morning)	王大陸 (Darren Wang)	Wang Ke	64	288	12
3	Da Zhangwei	《每天起来唱一遍》 (Sing It Once Every Morning)	王大陸 (Darren Wang)	Xu Xiaohan	24	288	12
3	Da Zhangwei	《每天起来唱一遍》 (Sing It Once Every Morning)	王大陸 (Darren Wang)	Joyce Chu/Zhu Zhuai	102	288	12
4	Han Xingzhou	《对心》 (Right Place)	任豪 (Ren Hao from R1SE)	Zhao Yue	80	290	26
4	Han Xingzhou	《对心》 (Right Place)	任豪 (Ren Hao from R1SE)	Chen Qiannan	19	290	26
4	Han Xingzhou	《对心》 (Right Place)	任豪 (Ren Hao from R1SE)	Liu Meng	53	290	26
4	Han Xingzhou	《对心》 (Right Place)	任豪 (Ren Hao from R1SE)	Su Ruiqi	105	290	26
4	Han Xingzhou	《对心》 (Right Place)	任豪 (Ren Hao from R1SE)	Zeng Xueyao	33	290	26
5	Zheng Nan	《着迷》 (Lost in ME)	丁禹兮 (Ryan Ding/Ding Yuxi)	Nene/Zheng Naixin	157	284	70
5	Zheng Nan	《着迷》 (Lost in ME)	丁禹兮 (Ryan Ding/Ding Yuxi)	Hu Jiaxin	45	284	70
5	Zheng Nan	《着迷》 (Lost in ME)	丁禹兮 (Ryan Ding/Ding Yuxi)	Hu Ma'er	21	284	70
5	Zheng Nan	《着迷》 (Lost in ME)	丁禹兮 (Ryan Ding/Ding Yuxi)	Kang Xi	19	284	70
5	Zheng Nan	《着迷》 (Lost in ME)	丁禹兮 (Ryan Ding/Ding Yuxi)	Li Jiaen	30	284	70
5	Zheng Nan	《着迷》 (Lost in ME)	丁禹兮 (Ryan Ding/Ding Yuxi)	Wu Yalu	12	284	70
6	Xu Rongzhen	《Ice Queen》	张云龙 (Zhang Yunlong)	Curley Gao/Xilinnayi Gao	133	291	65
6	Xu Rongzhen	《Ice Queen》	张云龙 (Zhang Yunlong)	Li Mengqi	40	291	65
6	Xu Rongzhen	《Ice Queen》	张云龙 (Zhang Yunlong)	Sun Zhenni	48	291	65
6	Xu Rongzhen	《Ice Queen》	张云龙 (Zhang Yunlong)	Tian Jingfan	43	291	65
6	Xu Rongzhen	《Ice Queen》	张云龙 (Zhang Yunlong)	Wang Yiqiao	18	291	65
6	Xu Rongzhen	《Ice Queen》	张云龙 (Zhang Yunlong)	Winnie Zhong/Zhong Feifei	9	291	65

=== Mission 4: Final Battle ===
Finale songs performances
Song	Team members
《摩登天后 It's a Bomb》	Nene/Zheng Naixin
《摩登天后 It's a Bomb》	Sally/Liu Xiening
《摩登天后 It's a Bomb》	Joyce Chu/Zhu Zhuai
《摩登天后 It's a Bomb》	Liu Nian
《摩登天后 It's a Bomb》	Wu Yalu
《摩登天后 It's a Bomb》	Su Ruiqi
《摩登天后 It's a Bomb》	Wang Ke
《摩登天后 It's a Bomb》	Liu Meng
《火羽 Phoenix》	Zhao Yue
《火羽 Phoenix》	Curley Gao/Xilinnayi Gao
《火羽 Phoenix》	Wang Yijin
《火羽 Phoenix》	Chen Zhuoxuan
《火羽 Phoenix》	Xu Yiyang
《火羽 Phoenix》	Zhang Yifan
《火羽 Phoenix》	Lin Junyi

Special individual performances
Team	Team members	Songs	Artist	Group performance	Performance center
Vocal team	Wang Yijin	Shallow	Lady Gaga & Bradley Cooper	Daisies by Katy Perry	Curley Gao/Xilinnayi Gao
Vocal team	Joyce Chu/Zhu Zhuai	做梦 (Dream)	Joyce Chu/Zhu Zhuai (Original song)	Daisies by Katy Perry	Curley Gao/Xilinnayi Gao
Vocal team	Xu Yiyang	我们的明天 (Our Tomorrow)	Lu Han from 20 Once Again/重返20岁 OST	Daisies by Katy Perry	Curley Gao/Xilinnayi Gao
Vocal team	Su Ruiqi	在成都 (In Chengdu)	Su Ruiqi (Original song)	Daisies by Katy Perry	Curley Gao/Xilinnayi Gao
Vocal team	Wu Yalu	有可能的夜晚 (Possible Night)	周深 (Zhou Shen) from Singer 2020	Daisies by Katy Perry	Curley Gao/Xilinnayi Gao
Vocal team	Nene/Zheng Naixin	爱情不需要时间证明 (รักไม่ต้องการเวลา) (Note: Thai lyrics translated to Mandarin.)	Klear	Daisies by Katy Perry	Curley Gao/Xilinnayi Gao
Vocal team	Chen Zhuoxuan	Bang Bang	Jessie J, Ariana Grande, & Nicki Minaj	Daisies by Katy Perry	Curley Gao/Xilinnayi Gao
Vocal team	Curley Gao/Xilinnayi Gao	好想爱这个世界啊	华晨宇 (Hua Chenyu)	Daisies by Katy Perry	Curley Gao/Xilinnayi Gao
Dance team	Lin Junyi	Got your Love	Dirtyphonics x RIOT	敢 (Dare) Choreographed by Parris Goebel	Zhao Yue
Dance team	Zhang Yifan	水星记 (Mercury Records)	郭頂 (Guo Ding)	敢 (Dare) Choreographed by Parris Goebel	Zhao Yue
Dance team	Liu Meng	KillaBeatZ	KillaBeatZ	敢 (Dare) Choreographed by Parris Goebel	Zhao Yue
Dance team	Wang Ke	Strip	Little Mix	敢 (Dare) Choreographed by Parris Goebel	Zhao Yue
Dance team	Sally/Liu Xiening	Do You?	TroyBoi	敢 (Dare) Choreographed by Parris Goebel	Zhao Yue
Dance team	Liu Nian	No Way Man (ノーウェイマン)	AKB48 Team SH	敢 (Dare) Choreographed by Parris Goebel	Zhao Yue
Dance team	Zhao Yue	太子妃之舞 (Dance of the Crown Princess)	太子妃升职记/Go Princess Go OST	敢 (Dare) Choreographed by Parris Goebel	Zhao Yue

== Supplemental Shows ==
Along with the main Produce Camp 2020 show, Tencent also produced supplemental/derivative/spin-off shows which were released as web-exclusive content.

=== Chuang: House of Girls ===
In Chuang: House of Girls (Chinese: 《创可少女屋》; pinyin: Chuàng Kě Shàonǚ Wū), officially known as Chuang 2020 Inside, trainees gather at the show's "camp store", where they participate in games to accumulate "Kě Coins" (Chinese: 可币; pinyin: Kě Bì) (Note: The character "可" is used in many Chinese words, and may be used to refer to "can" (Chinese: 可以; pinyin: kěyǐ), "possible" (Chinese: 可能; pinyin: kěnéng), "cute" (Chinese: 可爱; pinyin: kě'ài), etc.) in order to purchase the items from the store that they have placed into their shopping carts at the beginning of each episode. Every episode, one trainee takes on the role of the "assistant clerk" (Chinese: 代班店员; pinyin: Dài bān diànyuán; lit. 'substitute clerk' or 'fill-in clerk'), to act as the MC and run the games.

=== Filming Set Diary ===
Filming Set Diary (Chinese: 《片场日记》; pinyin: Piànchǎng Rìjì) features behind-the-scenes clips of the trainees as they film the Produce Camp 2020 show.

== Discography ==
=== Singles ===
Title	Released	Language	Label
《你最最最重要》 (pinyin: Nǐ zuìzuìzuì zhòngyào; lit. 'You [Are] The Most Most Most Important') (You Are Everything To Me)	May 2, 2020	Mandarin	Tencent

Preceded by Produce Camp 2019	Chuang (franchise); Produce Camp 2020	Succeeded by Produce Camp 2021
