= Sun Zhenni =

Chinese singer and actress (born 2000)

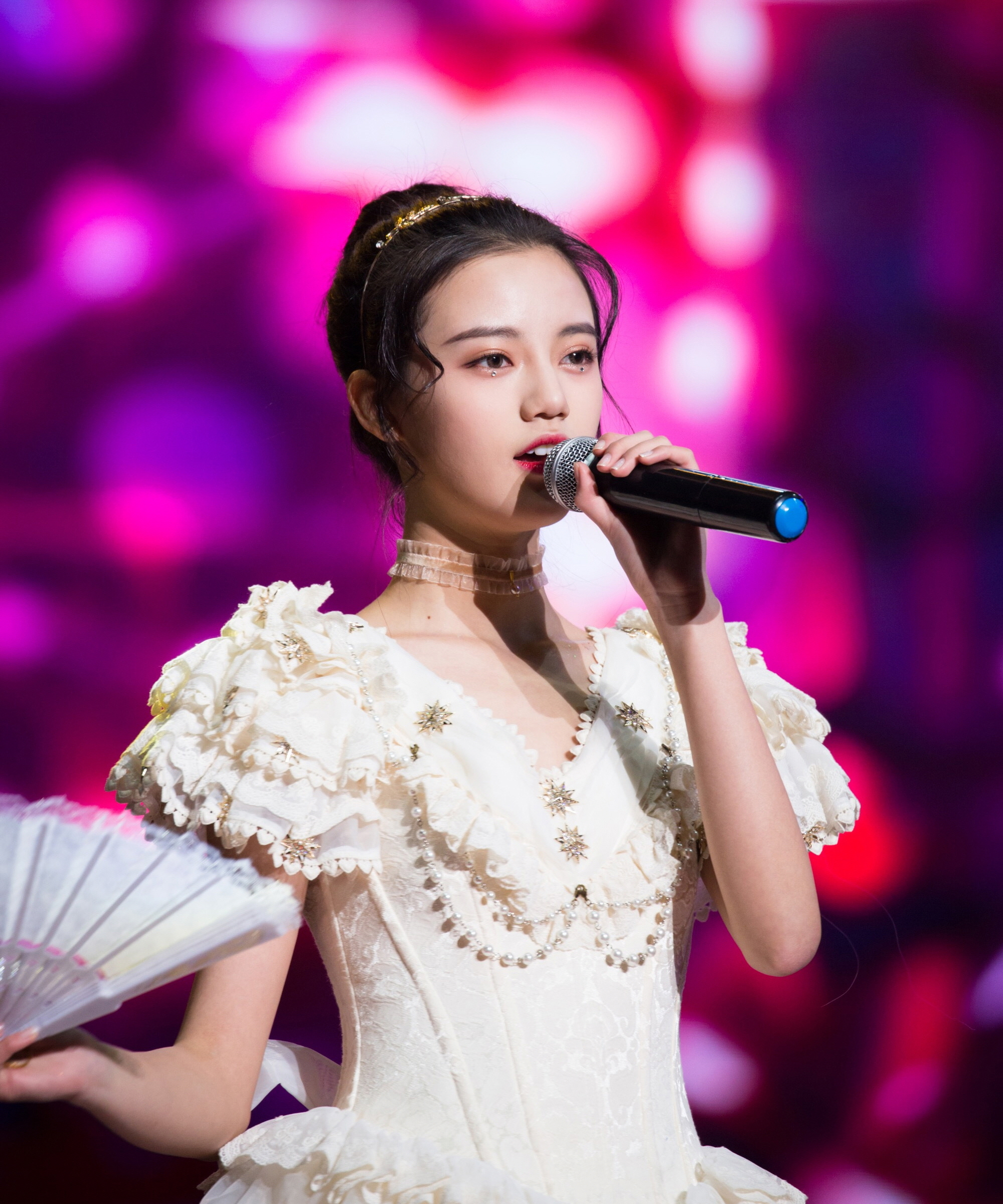
- Sun in 2018.
- Born: May 5, 2000 (age 26); Shanghai, China
- Occupations: Singer; actress
- Years active: 2016–present
- Musical career
- Origin: China
- Genres: Pop; Mandopop
- Instruments: Vocals, guitar
- Labels: Star48; Ninestyle Model Agency; Ninestyle Music
- Member of: SNH48; Color Girls; Style-7

Chinese name
- Traditional Chinese: 孫珍妮
- Simplified Chinese: 孙珍妮
Transcriptions
Standard Mandarin
- Hanyu Pinyin: Sūn Zhēnnī

Sun Zhenni (simplified Chinese: 孙珍妮; traditional Chinese: 孫珍妮; pinyin: Sūn Zhēnnī; born May 5, 2000, in Shanghai, China) is a Chinese singer and actress. She is a former member of Team HII of the Chinese idol group SNH48, as well as its sub-units, Color Girls and Style-7.

== Early life ==
Sun was born on May 5, 2000, in the Hongkou District of Shanghai, China. She was introduced to SNH48 by a friend, and successfully auditioned to join the group while still a student at the Shanghai Paddington Bi-Lingual School.

== Career ==
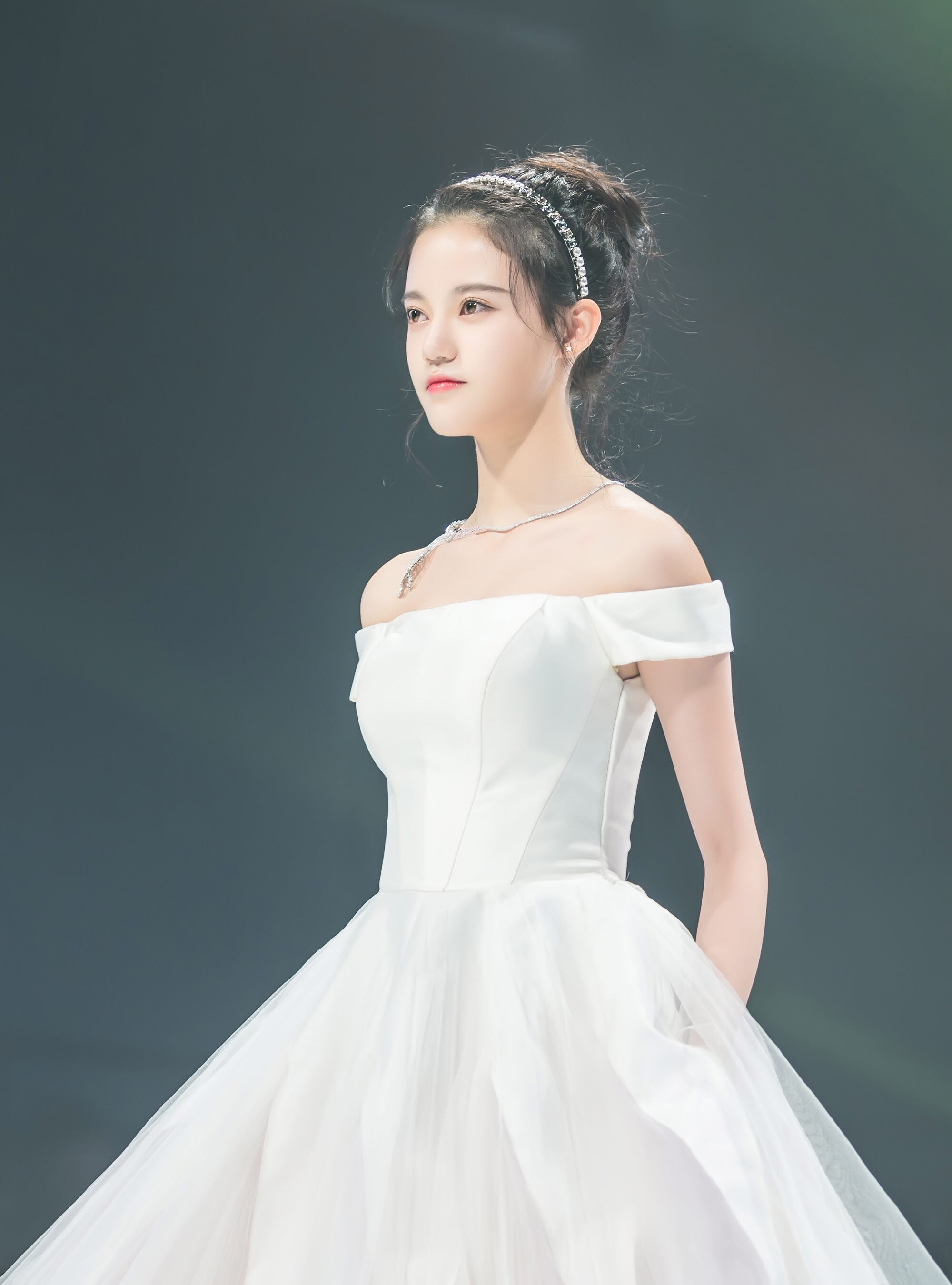
Sun in the SNH48's Fashion Awards in 2018

On March 26, 2016, Sun was announced as one of the sixth-generation members of SNH48, and was assigned to Team HII. She debuted during Team HII's third stage, "Idol no Yoake". On April 20 she joined the SM48 sub-yunit Color Girls. On July 30, she was ranked 21st during SNH48's third general election with 20334.1 votes, and was assigned to Under Girls. Meanwhile, she was also announced as one of the remaining two members of SNH48's sub-unit, Color Girls. On November 5, she came in sixth during SNH48's second Fashion Awards. On December 20, she made her first senbatsu appearance on SNH48's 14th EP, "Happy Wonder World".

On January 7, 2017, she participated in SNH48's third Request Time. In June 2017, Sun appeared in the Siba and iQIYI youth drama 见习爱神. On July 29, 2017, during SNH48's fourth general election, Sun came in 22nd with 28614.6 votes and was assigned to the Under Girls again. In December 2017 she participated in the Tencent audition variety show Star Mermaid for a chance to star in the sequel to Stephen Chow's hit film, "The Mermaid" and won. Filming began later that same year but the project is still pending release.

On July 28, 2018, Sun drastically dropped in rank and fell to 56th place with 14840.56 votes during SNH48's fifth general election. Fans speculate that the decline was due to her focus on acting and lack of appearance in SNH48 Theater performances. That same year she appeared in the Youku historical fantasy web drama 天意 in a supporting role as 天意. She was also cast in a supporting role in the contemporary youth drama 小夜曲 alongside fellow SNH48 members Huang Tingting and Lin Siyi and Chinese actor Cheney Chen which is expected to air in 2020. She was also cast in the comedy film Overall Planning which also has an expected release date of 2020.

At the start of 2019, Sun made a guest appearance as the mermaid in JJ Lin's performance of 那些你很冒险的梦 at the Jiangsu Television New Year's Eve Concert which drew 540 million viewers. That year, Sun decided to enroll in drama school and focused on studying for the National College Entrance Exam. Sun was accepted into China's three most prestigious drama schools; Beijing Film Academy, Central Drama Academy and Shanghai Theatre Academy, the only SNH48 member to achieve this accomplishment. She ultimately enrolled at Shanghai Theater Academy where she ranked 5th in the nation. The focus on her studies led to a lack of appearances in SNH48 Theater performances and her rankings fell again during the sixth elections, this time failing to rank at all. However, she was still able to appear on one of SNH48's main tracks that year Dream in a Summer and was also the MV center. In late 2019, her agency registered a trademark for her name along with fellow SNH48 member Xu Jiaqi, they are only a handful of SNH48 members or alumni who have had their names trademarked including Ju Jingyi and as a result are expected to receive heavy solo promotions in the future.

In 2020, Sun was a trainee contestant in the Tencent girl group survival show Produce Camp 2020 (also known as Chuang 2020) where she had a final ranking of 18 and leaving the show at the end of June 2020. She made a special appearance on the show's finale and performed Ice Cream on stage with Produce Camp mentor, Huang Zitao. On August 15, 2020, Sun was able to rank in SNH48's Top 48 for the first time since 2017 and was 30th with 195,908 votes during SNH48's seventh general election. She will again be included in the SNH48 Under Girls lineup. During her election speech she expressed an interest to focus on her studies and acting while still participating in SNH48.

== Personal life ==
Sun is Han Chinese with one-quarter German Jewish ancestry through her paternal grandmother.

Sun is close friends with several SNH48 members including Fei Qinyuan, Dai Meng (Diamond), Xu-Yang Yuzhuo (Eliwa), Zhao Yue (Akira) and Chen Qiannan. She has stated that she is very close to fellow Produce Camp contestants, Zhang Yifan, Liu Meng, and Tian Jingfan. At Shanghai Theater Academy, she is one of a handful of close-knit celebrity student friends along with Idol Producer contestant turned actor Chen Tao, Idol Producer contestant and ONER member Ling Chao and Produce Camp 2019 contestant and R1SE member He Luo Luo. She also is a fan of Taylor Swift.

== Discography ==
=== With SNH48 ===
==== EPs ====
Year	No.	Title	Role	Notes
2016	13	Princess's Cloak	A-side	Ranked 21st in the 3rd General election Sang on "Romantic Melody" with Under Girls; Also sang on "Brand New Love" with Team HII
2016	14	Happy Wonder World	A-side	
2017	15	Each Other's Future	B-side	Sang on "Beautiful World" with Team HII
2017	16	Summer Pirates	A-side	Also sang on "Distant dream" with Team HII
2017	17	Dawn in Naples	A-side	Ranked 22nd in the 4th General election Sang on "Glorious Times" with Under Girls
2017	18	Sweet Festival	A-side	Also sang on "Good Luck" with SNH48
2019	24	Dream in a Summer	A-side	MV Center

== Units ==
=== SNH48 Stage Units ===
Stage No.	Song	Notes
Team HII 4th Stage "Beautiful World"	Chemical super woman 化学超女子	With Hao Wanqing, Li Qingyang and Wang Lujiao

=== Concert units ===
Year	Date	Name	Song	Notes
2016	30 July	3rd General Election Concert	None	
2017	7 January	Request Hour Setlist Best 50 (3rd Edition)	Kinjirareta Futari 禁忌的两人	With Wan Lina

== Filmography ==
=== Films ===
Year	Title	Role	Notes
2020	Overall Planning (日不落酒店)	Hong (红)	Supporting Role
2017	Cupid's Apprentice (见习爱神)	Manman (漫漫)	Supporting Role

=== Television series ===
Year	Title	Role	Notes
2025	The Blossoming Love (千朵桃花一世开)	Mu Xuan Ling	Main Role
2023	Dear Mr. Heavenly Fox (亲爱的天狐大人)	Su Qian-Qian	Supporting Role
2023	Till the End of the Moon (长月烬明)	Pian Ran	Supporting Role
2020	So Young (小夜曲)	Xue Er (雪儿)	Supporting Role
2018	Hero's Dream (天意)	Tian Yi (天依)	Supporting Role

=== Television shows ===
Year	Title	Role	Notes
2020	We Are Blazing	Contestant	
2020	Produce Camp 2020	Contestant	Final Rank: 18
2018	Star Mermaid	Contestant	Winner
