= Wang Yijin =

Chinese singer and actress

- 王艺瑾
- Born: Wang Yunxuan; December 25, 1996 (age 29); Jinan, Shandong, China
- Occupations: Singer; Actress
- Years active: 2017–present
- Agent: Jay Walk Studio
- Musical career
- Also known as: Rita Wang, Xuān Xuān, Yījīnzǐ
- Genres: C-pop; Mandopop; K-pop
- Formerly of: BonBon Girls 303

Wang Yijin (Chinese: 王艺瑾, born Wang Yunxuan (王韻宣) on December 25, 1996) also known by her English name Rita Wang, is a Chinese film and television actress and singer. She was a member and lead vocalist of BonBon Girls 303 after placing third on Produce Camp 2020. The group disbanded on July 4, 2022, and she resumed her activities as a solo artist and actress.

== Early life ==
Wang Yijin, whose real name is Wang Yunxuan mentioned that she was used to be overweight back in her childhood and early teenage years. She graduated from high school in Shandong Jinan Foreign Language School. She graduated from college, majoring in Musical Drama Arts and Theater in Central Academy of Drama. She also attended several courses in Beijing Dance Academy and finished her thesis during Produce Camp 2020.

== Career ==
In early 2000, the 5-year-old Wang Yijin co-hosted the children's program "Sunshine Express Lane" of Shandong Satellite TV with Da Bing and Da Tou (Liu Zichang), which was recognized by the audience. In addition, she also hosted the evening party of the local satellite TV.

Prior to signing up with Jaywalk in 2018, she was a theater actress.

On October 11, 2016, her solo single "Feng Hua Yuan Meng" was released, which is also the Chinese cheongsam meeting song.

In February 2019, she participated in the CCTV-15 music program Feng Hua National Music and sang the song Feng hua yuan Dream. Her acting career started in an urban family drama starring Zhang Jiayi, Yan Ni, and Zhao Jinmai in A Little Reunion as the roommate of Lin Miao Miao.

She also has a role in the series of Yang Mi and Vin Zhang in Storm Eye.

She then participated in the Tencent's Produce Camp 2020. She sang "I Like You" by Kit Chan as her audition for the vocal in the first episode, performed "Muttering" by Stefanie Sun with A+ Students (Jaywalk NewJoy Trainees). For the Group Battle, she performed "Magical" under LTG with Zhao Yue. For the Position Evaluation, she performed "The World Would Not Easily Collapse" under LTG for Vocal Group with Curley Gao. For the Concept Battle, she performed "Isolation" with Chen Zhuoxuan and Aarif Rahman as the guest male senior who she had a special duet with. She performed Lady Gaga's Shallow for her solo performance during the finals. She sang Daisies by Katy Perry and for the Final Performance, she performed "Phoenix". She finished in 3rd place debuting as a member of BonBon Girls 303 (A project girl group with a 2-year contract) under Wajijiwa Entertainment.

== Discography ==
=== Singles ===
List of singles, showing year released, selected chart positions, and name of the album
Year	Title	Peak (TME Uni Chart)		Album
Year	Title	CHN	Score	Album
2016	"FengHuaYuan Dream" 风华媛梦	—	—	Non-Album Single
2021	"White Moonlight" 白月光	—	—	Non-Album Single
2022	"Like You" 喜歡你	—	—	Non-Album Single
2022	"Can't Get Any Closer" 無法再靠近	—	—	Non-Album Single

== Filmography ==
=== Television series ===
Year	Title	Role	Notes	Ref.
2019	Growing Pain 少年派	Liang Yun Shu	Supporting Role	
2021	Storm Eye 暴风眼	Miao Lu	Supporting Role	
2022	Taste of Love 绝配酥心唐	Tang Su	Main Role	
TBA	Xuanyuan's journey in the snow 轩辕之雪中行	Tuoba Yu'er	Main Role	
TBA	Go and Domain Your Game 开局一座山	Su Ying	Main Role	
	The Shiny Group 你好我们是欢喜天团	Wan Yu	Main Role	
TBA	Intership Detective 吃瓜神探		Main Role	

=== Television shows ===
Year	Title	Network	Role	Notes
2000	Sunshine Expressway 陽光快車道	Shandong TV	Host	
2020	Produce Camp 2020	Tencent	Contestant	Survival show determining BonBon Girls 303 members Placed 3rd
2020	We Are Blazing	Tencent	Special Participant Judge	
2020	The Coming One: Season 4	Tencent	Special Participant	
