= BonBon Girls 303 =

Chinese girl group

BonBon Girls 303 硬糖少女 303
- Origin: China
- Genres: Mandopop
- Years active: 2020–2022
- Labels: Wajijiwa Entertainment; Tencent Music
- Past members: Curley Gao; Zhao Yue; Wang Yijin; Chen Zhuoxuan; Nene/Zheng Naixin; Sally/Liu Xiening; Zhang Yifan

BonBon Girls 303 (Chinese: 硬糖少女303; pinyin: Yìng táng shàonǚ Sān líng sān; lit. 'Hard Candy Girls 303') was a Chinese girl group formed through the 2020 reality show Produce Camp 2020 on Tencent Video and managed by Wajijiwa Entertainment. The group consisted of seven members: Curley Gao, Zhao Yue, Wang Yijin, Chen Zhuoxuan, Nene/Zheng Naixin, Sally/Liu Xiening, and Zhang Yifan.

The group debuted on August 11, 2020, with the EP The Law of Hard Candy, and disbanded on July 4, 2022.

== History ==
=== Pre-debut: Produce Camp 2020 ===
BonBon Girls 303 was formed on July 4, 2020 through Tencent's reality survival show Produce Camp 2020. The group only consisted of seven members, unlike the groups which debuted through the previous seasons of the show which had eleven members (Rocket Girls 101, R1SE). The final group includes members from different companies: Curley Gao, Zhao Yue, Wang Yijin, Chen Zhuoxuan, Nene/Zheng Naixin, Liu Xiening, and Zhang Yifan.

=== 2020–2022: Group activities and disbandment ===
BonBon Girls 303 released their first EP The Law of Hard Candy (硬糖定律) on August 11, 2020. The EP is supported by three singles, "BonBon Girls" released on August 24, "Super A Warning Ahead" on September 1, and "PLMM" on September 14. The track "We Are Young" was also released on August 14 as the theme song for Super Novae Games 2020.

The group released their second EP Fearless Girls (了不起的女孩) and its lead single "Slay and Play" on April 27, 2021.

The group released their third EP BonBon Voyage (别怕，未来会来) and its lead single "Me And My Girls" on May 20, 2022.

The group officially disbanded on July 4, 2022 after 2 years of promotions.

== Members ==
- Curley/Xilinnayi Gao (希林娜依·高/شىرىناي گاو)
- Akira/Zhao Yue (赵粤)
- Rita/Wang Yijin (王艺瑾)
- Krystal/Chen Zhuoxuan (陈卓璇)
- Nene/Zheng Naixin (郑乃馨, พรนับพัน พรเพ็ญพิพัฒน์ / Pornnappan Pornpenpipat)
- Sally/Xiening (刘些宁)
- Emily/Zhang Yifan (张艺凡)

== Discography ==
=== Extended plays ===
Title	Album details	Sales
The Law of Hard Candy (硬糖定律)	Released: August 11, 2020; Label: Wajijiwa Entertainment, Tencent; Formats: CD, digital download, streaming; Track listing: 1. You Are Everything To Me (你最最最重要); 2. BonBon Girls; 3. We Are Young (硬要赢); 4. Super A Warning Ahead (前方超A预警); 5. PLMM; 6. Super A Warning Ahead (前方超A预警) (Ballad Version); 7. Trick Or Treat (吃糖)	CHN: 820,000+ (dig.)
Fearless Girls (了不起的女孩)	Released: April 27, 2021; Label: Wajijiwa Entertainment, Tencent; Formats: CD, digital download, streaming; Track listing: 1. Slay and Play (双马尾); 2. Today's Fortune (今日運勢); 3. Fearless Girls (了不起的女孩); 4. Funk Up Dance (不想睡 2021); 5. Slay and Play (English ver.); 6. Before Autumn (秋天前)	CHN: 392+ (phy.)
BonBon Voyage (别怕，未来会来)	Released: May 20, 2022; Label: Wajijiwa Entertainment, Tencent; Formats: Digital download, streaming; Track listing: 1. @Us (@我们); 2. I Remember You (最最重要); 3. Bon-Us; 4. Me And My Girls (狂飙); 5. We'll Rule The World (按我的來); 6. BonBon Voyage (别怕，未来会来)	—

=== Singles ===
Title	Year	Album
"BonBon Girls"	2020	The Law of Hard Candy (硬糖定律)
"We Are Young" (硬要赢)	2020	The Law of Hard Candy (硬糖定律)
"Super A Warning Ahead" (前方超A预警)	2020	The Law of Hard Candy (硬糖定律)
"PLMM"	2020	The Law of Hard Candy (硬糖定律)
"Slay and Play" (双马尾)	2021	Fearless Girls (了不起的女孩)
"Fearless Girls" (了不起的女孩)	2021	Fearless Girls (了不起的女孩)
"I Remember You" (最最重要)	2022	BonBon Voyage (别怕，未来回来)
"Me And My Girls" (狂飙)	2022	BonBon Voyage (别怕，未来回来)
"We'll Rule The World" (按我的來)	2022	BonBon Voyage (别怕，未来回来)
"BonBon Voyage" (别怕，未来会来)	2022	BonBon Voyage (别怕，未来回来)

=== Soundtrack appearances ===
Title	Year	Album
"Pull Me" (拉我)	2020	Shenwu 4 10th Anniversary Promotional Single
"Just Team Up" (集合时刻)	2021	PlayerUnknown's Battlegrounds Promotional Single
"Shrek Academy" (史兰客学苑)	2021	Douluo Continent OST

== Filmography ==
=== Reality Shows ===
Year	Title	Network	Notes
2020	Produce Camp 2020	Tencent Video	Contestants
2020	Super Novae Games	Tencent Video	Contestants
2020	Super Penguin League Season 3	Tencent Video	Contestants
2020	We Are Blazing	Tencent Video	Guests for Episode 8
2020	The Coming One Super Band	Performer and Participants in Episode 8 and 9	
2020	Youth Periplous	Zhejiang TV	Guests for Episode 10
2020	Crossover Singer	BTV	Performer in finale episode
2020	BON-US	Tencent Video	Group's variety show
2021	SHE FIGHTER	Tencent Video	Group's variety show
2021	Produce Camp 2021	Tencent Video	International Assistant (Nene / Zheng Naixin), Special Guest in Episode 10
2021	BON US One Year Slay&Play Trip	Tencent Video	Group's variety show
2021	Youth and Melody	Dragon Television	Regular Cast (Xilinnayi/Curley Gao) and Guests in Episodes 3，6，7，8，9
