= Xu Yiyang =

Chinese singer and actress (born 1997)

- Born: September 12, 1997 (age 29); Nanchong, Sichuan, China
- Occupations: Singer; actress
- Years active: 2016–present
- Spouse: Huang Zitao (m. 2024)
- Musical career
- Origin: Beijing, China
- Genre: C-pop
- Instrument: Vocals
- Label: L.Tao
- Formerly of: Legal High

Chinese name
- Simplified Chinese: 徐艺洋
Transcriptions
Standard Mandarin
- Hanyu Pinyin: Xú Yìyáng

Korean name
- Hangul: 쉬이양
Transcriptions
- Revised Romanization: Swi Iyang
- McCune–Reischauer: Shwi Iyang

Xu Yiyang (born September 12, 1997) is a Chinese singer and actress.

== Career ==
=== 2016–2018: SM Rookies ===
Influenced by the girl groups at the time and other artists such as Lu Han and Victoria Song, Xu auditioned for SM Entertainment in 2014 and was revealed as the newest member of the trainee group SM Rookies, alongside Aespa's Ningning on September 19, 2016. During her time as a trainee, Xu appeared on the Rookies Princess: Who's the Best? segment of the program My SMT that year.

On October 1, 2018, Xu confirmed she had left SM Entertainment and returned to China, later signing under former Exo member Huang Zitao's label L.Tao Entertainment. Xu then joined the idol competition show The Next Top Bang on October 16.

=== 2019–present: Legal High and solo activities ===
Xu debuted in January, 2019, as a member of the project group Legal High (Chinese: 嗨战队; pinyin: Hāi Zhànduì), formed from the final survivors of the girls' team on The Next Top Bang. The group were active for a year, releasing two singles: their debut single "嗨 (Hi)" on January 3, and "心星 (Heart Star)" on February 18.

On May 2, 2020, Xu participated in the Chinese girl group reality competition show Produce Camp 2020 where she was eliminated in the final episode on July 4, finishing in eighth place. Following the completion of the show, Xu made her solo debut on July 16 with the single "聆听 (Listen)". On September 28, she released the single "OMG". On December 18, she made her acting debut as the female lead in the web series Timeless Love which was released the following year.

On January 8, 2021, Xu released her first EP 会不会再见 (Will We Meet Again).

== Personal life ==
Xu is married to Huang Zitao. The two had first met when Xu was a trainee at SM and Huang was still a member of Exo. After both had left the company, they met again in Shanghai in 2018. Rumours surrounding their relationship had been circulating since 2020, and the two confirmed their relationship on their respective Weibo accounts on July 14, 2024. On August 26 the same year, Huang proposed to Xu on his reality show Dare or Not. The two got married after 5 months of public dating on December 2.

== Discography ==
=== Extended plays ===
Title	Details
会不会再见 (Will We Meet Again)	Released: January 8, 2021; Label: L.Tao Entertainment; Formats: CD, digital download, streaming

=== Single albums ===
Title	Details
花湮灭 (Wither)	Released: June 24, 2021; Label: L.Tao Entertainment; Formats: CD, digital download, streaming
Wonderful Life	Released: December 8, 2023; Label: L.Tao Entertainment; Formats: CD, digital download, streaming

=== Singles ===
List of singles as lead artist, showing year released, selected chart positions and album name
Title	Year	Peak chart position	Album
Title	Year	CHN (Note: The China TME UNI Chart was launched by Tencent Music in 2018 and first published by Billboard in November 2022.)	Album
"聆听 (Listen)"	2020	11	Non-album singles
"OMG"	2020	23	Non-album singles
"会不会再见 (Gravity)"	2021	55	会不会再见 (Will We Meet Again)
"如果的事 (What If)"	2021	91	Non-album single
"花湮灭 (Wither)"	2021	—	花湮灭 (Wither)
"有你 (Have You)"	2021	—	Non-album singles
"暖 (Warmth)"	2022	—	Non-album singles
"Mirror Mirror"	2022	—	Non-album singles
"雨过天晴"	2023	—	Wonderful Life
"拾荒者"	2024	—	Non-album singles
"冬日里"	2024	—	Non-album singles
"—" denotes releases that did not chart or were not released in that region.

=== Collaborations ===
Title	Year	Peak chart position	Album
Title	Year	CHN	Album
"十二月的圣诞节 (Sweet Christmas)" with Huang Zitao and Shi Xitong	2021	69	Non-album singles
"闹钟在 (Tik Tok)" with Doggie	2023	—	Non-album singles
"—" denotes releases that did not chart or were not released in that region.

=== Soundtracks ===
Title	Year	Album
"余生有幸"	2021	Love Is Beautiful OST
"不平凡的爱" with Renyu Zheng	2022	Hello, the Sharpshooter OST
"左右"	2022	The Old Dreams OST
"我不说你也要懂我想在一起"	2022	Almost Love (2022 film) OST
"直线爱情 (Straight-Forward Love)" with Zhang Yunlong	2023	Yes, I Do Season 4 OST

== Filmography ==
=== Television series ===
Year	Title	Role	Notes	Ref.
2020	Airbenders	Xu Jing	Supporting role	
2023	New Vanity Fair	Tan Xiao Xin	Supporting role	

=== Web series ===
Year	Title	Role	Notes	Ref.
2021	Timeless Love	Cheng Feng	Main role	
2021	Nan Xiang School	Xiao Meng	Supporting role	
2022	Ally Tian Cheng Wonderful Accident	Chu Xia	Supporting role	
2024	Perfect Her	Ning Mo Chen	Main role	
2024	The Demon Chef	Shi Zi	Main role	
TBA	Ti Bi Zai Wang Que Ni	Yan Ying	Main role	

=== Television shows ===
Year	Title	Role	Notes	Ref.
2016	My SMT	Cast member	Pre-debut	
2018	The Next Top Bang	Contestant		
2019	Super Nova Games Season 2	Cast member		
2020	Produce Camp 2020	Contestant	Finished 8th	
2020	Dunk of China Season 3	Cast member		
2021	Super Nova Games Season 4	Cast member		
2022	90‘s Dating Agency 2022	Host		
2022	Wonderland Junior	Cast member		
2023	Yes, I Do Season 4	Host		
2023	We Are the Champions Season 2	Cast member		
2024	Dare or Not	Cast member		
