= Pornnappan Pornpenpipat =

Thai singer and actress (born 1997)

- พรนับพัน พรเพ็ญพิพัฒน์
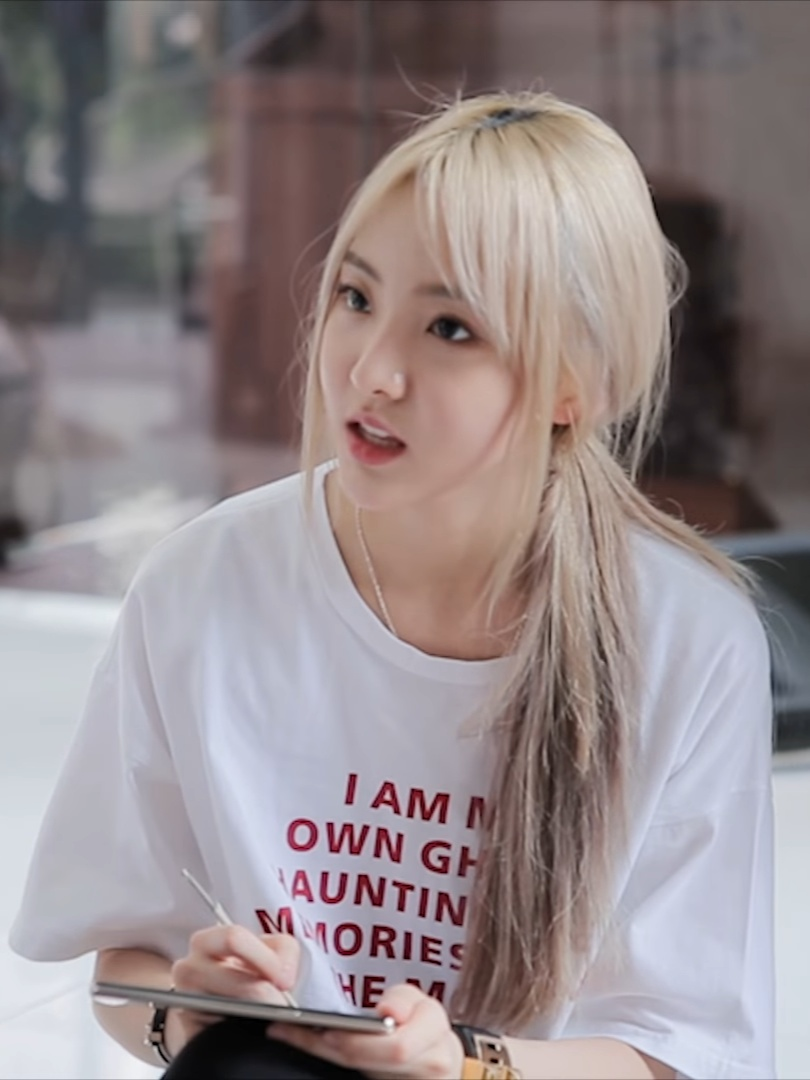
- Pornnappan in 2018
- Born: Pornnappan Pornpenpipat; 25 June 1997 (age 29); Bangkok, Thailand
- Other name: Zheng Naixin
- Occupations: Singer; actress
- Musical career
- Genres: Pop; Mandopop; T-pop
- Instrument: Vocals
- Years active: 2015–present
- Labels: HALO Society; GMM Grammy; Wajijiwa; Tencent (Note: As a member of BonBon Girls 303 only.); Sony
- Formerly of: MilkShake; BonBon Girls 303

Chinese name
- Traditional Chinese: 鄭乃馨
- Simplified Chinese: 郑乃馨
Transcriptions
Standard Mandarin
- Hanyu Pinyin: Zhèng Nǎixīn

Pornnappan Pornpenpipat (Note: Thai: พรนับพัน พรเพ็ญพิพัฒน์, RTGS: Phonnapphan Phonphenphiphat, Thai pronunciation: [pʰɔːn.náp.pʰan pʰɔːn.pʰen.pʰí.pʰát]) (born 25 June 1997), nicknamed Nene (Thai: เนเน่), also known by her Chinese name Zheng Naixin (Chinese: 郑乃馨; pinyin: Zhèng Nǎixīn), is a Thai singer and actress under Sony Music China. She gained her popularity after placing fifth on the final episode of Produce Camp 2020 and debuting in project group BonBon Girls 303 back in 2020.

== Early life ==
Nene was born on June 25, 1997, in Bangkok, Thailand. Her family is Thai-Chinese. She has attended Thai-German Engineering Preparatory School and King Mongkut's University of Technology North Bangkok. She was nicknamed Nene because her mother loved Crayon Shin-chan and named her after the character Nene.

== Career ==
=== 2013–2019: AF10, MilkShake and debut as an actress ===
In 2013, Nene competed in True Academy Fantasia 10 (AF10) as the youngest contestant and finished in 12th place in the final episode.

On November 8, 2015, Nene started her career when she debuted as a member of the Thai idol group MilkShake managed by GMM Grammy and released the first digital single "Share" with the group. In the same year, she served as a radio DJ for Channel 93 "Talk Talk". In 2016, MilkShake released their second single "JOH", then disbanded after.

In 2017, she travelled to China and participated in the music culture program Sing the Chinese, and sang the song "I Don't Want to Say". In the same year, the urban romance film "The Doll (宅男长成记之人偶初恋)" began shooting, in where she played as a physical doll.

On August 19 of the same year, she made her acting debut in Thailand in the romantic comedy series, Teenage Mom: The Series under GMMTV. On April 20, 2018, she played as Christine, one of the main roles in the Vietnamese Comedy Action Film "Lat Mat 3: Ba Chang Khuyet".

On June 28, 2019, the Chinese urban fantasy romance drama Nice to Meet UFO co-starring Jack Jarupong as Xie Chen Xi and Zhu Yiwen as Gu Liu Nian was released. In the play, Nene played the little alien named "Xuan" who lived in the body of Qin, a young star on the 18th-tier star, thus officially debuted in China as an actress.

=== 2020–present: Produce Camp 2020, BonBon Girls 303, Sony Music ===
In 2020, she starred in the romantic drama 2gether, in which she played "Air", the senior of the music club. In April, using the stage name Zheng Naixin (Chinese: 郑乃馨; pinyin: Zhèng Nǎixīn), Nene participated in the Tencent Video's Chinese girl group reality competition show, Produce Camp 2020. During the first episode of the show, she served as one of the three participants with the strongest vocal powers. She then participated in the singing of Produce Camp 2020's theme song, "You Are Everything To Me". In July 4, she placed fifth in the finals of the show and later debuted in the all-female Chinese idol group BonBon Girls 303. On July 12 of the same year, the Thai horror TV series "Long Khong: The Art of the Devil" was released, in which she played Aya. In August 11, BonBon Girls 303's first EP The Law of Hard Candy was released.

In January 2021, she joined the 2021 edition of the variety show Produce Camp by Tencent Video as an international assistant mentor. On March 10, 2021, she participated in the first martial arts office business experience reality show "She Fighter" produced by Tencent Video.

On July 4, 2022, the group BonBon Girls 303 announced its official disbandment. Shortly after, on the 12th day of the same month, she joined Sony Music China and released its first solo album debut song "Promise". In July, it was announced that she would participate in Bilibili Forward. On August 21, she participated in the third stage of Douyin's Masked Dance King. On November 23, it was announced that she would participate in the new Chinese drama Confess Your Love, where she played Lin Chen/Lin Wen. In December, she participated in the 2022 Weibo Hip-hop Competition and served as the star promoter of the event. On April 19, 2023, Nene released her first extended play Gentle on My Mind. In July 2024, Nene released the digital single "สาย (Gone)".

== Controversy ==
In April 2025, a video clip from an interview circulated on Chinese social media in which she commented on the condition of public toilets in China, specifically regarding cleanliness and the lack of flushing after use. According to reports by Tencent News, Sohu, Lianhe Zaobao, Sing Tao Daily, Manager Daily, and other media outlets, some internet users considered the remarks inappropriate, leading to online criticism and discussion on Chinese social media platforms and in other regions.

Some commentators also focused on her facial expressions and tone during the interview, which they interpreted as disrespectful. The incident prompted broader online debate about public facilities and differing cultural perceptions.

== Personal life ==
=== Relationship ===
On 22 April 2024, Nene announced that she is in relationship with Thai singer and actor Vachirawit Chivaaree, whom she met during work within the industry 4 years back. In November 2025, media outlets reported on the status of Nene's relationship with Vachirawit Chivaaree after the two unfollowed each other on Instagram. During the same period, Nene posted a cryptic message on her Instagram Story, stating, 'I couldn’t even cry – the hatred was stronger than the sorrow,' leading to widespread public speculation regarding their breakup. However, neither party has officially confirmed the change in their relationship status.

== Discography ==
=== Extended plays ===
Title	Details
Gentle on My Mind	Released: April 19, 2023; Label: Sony Music; Formats: CD, digital download; Track listing: 1. "One Sunny Day"; 2. "Gentle on My Mind"; 3. "Aiya Aiya"; 4. "Promise"; 5. "Forgotten"; 6. "All About That Day"; 7. "My star"

=== Singles ===
With MilkShake
Name	Release date
"แห่ / Share"	November 18, 2015
"โจ๊ะ / JOH"	April 7, 2016

List of singles, showing year released, selected chart positions, and name of the album
Title	Year	Album
"Promise" 約定	2022	Non-album single
"Love, Love" 愛呀愛呀	2022	Non-album single
"One Sunny Day" 某一个晴天	2022	Non-album single
"Tenderness with the World" 与世界温柔相处	2022	Non-album single
"Forgotten" 被遺忘的故事	2023	Gentle on My Mind
"All about that day"	2023	Gentle on My Mind
"สาย (Gone)"	2024	Non-album single

=== Soundtrack appearances ===
Year	Title	Album	Ref.
2022	"See You Tomorrow" 明天见	"Fantasy Garden" 5th Anniversary Theme Song	
2022	"I Guess You Are Heartbeating Too" 我猜你也心动	Mr. Bad OST	

=== Composition credits ===
List of songs, showing year released, artist name, name of the album, and credited roles
Title	Year	Artist	Album	Composer	Lyricist	Ref.
"สาย (Gone)"	2024	Pornnappan Pornpenpipat	Non-album single	Yes	Yes	

== Videography ==
=== Music videos ===
Title	Year	Director(s)	Ref.
"สาย (Gone)"	2024	Thonthan Suwittayasiri and Supawan Eiawad (Woofer Film)	

== Filmography ==
=== Films ===
Year	Title	Role	Notes	Ref.
2017	Lat Mat 3: Ba Chang Khuyet	Christine	Vietnamese film	

=== Television series ===
Year	Title	Role	Ref.
2017	Teenage Mom	Fon	
2020	2gether	Air	
2020	Long Khong	Aya	

=== Web series ===
Year	Title	Role	Ref.
2019	Nice To Meet UFO	Qin	
2023	Confess Your Love	Lin Chen / Lin Wan	
2024	Insect Detective: Season 2	Hu Die	

=== Web shows ===
Year	Title	Role	Notes	Ref.
2013	True Academy Fantasia 10	Contestant		
2020	Produce Camp 2020	Contestant	Finished 5th	
2021	Produce Camp 2021	International Assistant		
2024	Produce Camp Asia: Thailand	Mentor		

== Endorsements ==
Year	Role	Brand	Ref.
2021	Brand Friend	Lancôme	

== Ambassadorship ==
- China–Thailand Cultural Ambassador (2022)
- Thailand Customs Festival China–Thailand Cultural Exchange Ambassador (2022)
