= The Next Top Bang =

Chinese television show

- Also known as: Chinese: 下一站传奇
- 下一站传奇
- Genre: Reality-talent show
- Directed by: Yan Min
- Presented by: Lin Hai, Si Wenjia
- Starring: William Chan; G.E.M. Hu Haiquan; Kris Wu; Victoria Song; Bibi Zhou
- Opening theme: The Next Top Bang
- Country of origin: China
- Original language: Chinese
- No. of seasons: 1

Production
- Production location: China
- Running time: 90 minutes

Original release
- Network: Dragon Television
- Release: October 21, 2018 – January 6, 2019

Related
- Chinese Idol

The Next Top Bang (Chinese: 下一站传奇; pinyin: xià yí zhàn chuán qí) is an original Chinese reality variety show produced by Dragon Television. It was first aired on 21 October 2018.

== Concept ==
The Next Top Bang brings together 108 trainees from 13,699 auditionees. Out of the 108 trainees, they are split according to their genders, and compete for their debut.

== Mentors ==
The mentor teams are William, G.E.M. and Haiquan for male and Kris, Victoria and Bibi for female.

Name	Age	Team	Notes
William Chan	32	Male Team (Team All In / 挺齐全战队)	Solo artist
G.E.M.	27	Male Team (Team All In / 挺齐全战队)	Solo artist
Hu Haiquan	43	Male Team (Team All In / 挺齐全战队)	Member of Yu Quan
Kris Wu	28	Female Team (Team Legal High / 嗨战队)	Solo artist
Victoria Song	31	Female Team (Team Legal High / 嗨战队)	Member of f(x)
Bibi Zhou	33	Female Team (Team Legal High / 嗨战队)	Solo artist

== Contestants ==
=== Female ===
Contestants
Number	Name	Nationality	Date of birth	Class
001	Qu Xue 曲雪	China	January 1, 1994 (age 32)	B
002	Chen Jiaxin 陈嘉歆	China	October 23, 1995 (age 30)	B
003	Li Danlei 李丹蕾	China		B
005	Xie Keyin 谢可寅	China	January 4, 1997 (age 29)	D
006	Zhou Xue 周雪	China	November 30, 1998 (age 27)	C
007	Yang Meiling 楊美玲	China	March 21, 1998 (age 28)	D
008	Yang Meiqi 楊美琪	China	March 21, 1998 (age 28)	D
009	Wang Linqing 汪林晴	China		D
010	Hu Enning 胡恩宁	Taiwan	August 13, 1994 (age 32)	B
011	Xi Yu 席宇	China	August 22, 1994 (age 32)	C
012	Wang Yaqi 王雅琪	China		Eliminated
013	Zhang Jingwei 张婧薇	China		
014	Li Tianyun 李天韵	China	May 28, 1998 (age 28)	A
015	Lin Junyi 林君怡	China	June 14, 1999 (age 27)	A
016	Jiang He 姜贺	China		D
017	Yang Han 楊晗	China	June 28, 1995 (age 31)	A
018	Wu Zhuofan 吴卓凡	China	September 26, 1995 (age 30)	A
019	Wu Jingyi 吴静怡	China	December 20, 1994 (age 31)	
020	Zhu Kejia 朱可佳	China	July 10, 1993 (age 33)	A
021	Zhang Fangzheng 张正方	China	February 12, 1998 (age 28)	B
022	Shu Shu 舒舒	China	February 12, 1992 (age 34)	A
023	Xiao Wu 小伍	China	October 22, 1998 (age 27)	C
024	Chen Leyi 陈乐一	China		A
025	Gu Libo 菇力帕	Hong Kong		C
026	Xu Ziyin 徐紫茵	China	May 6, 1996 (age 30)	C
027	Xin Qingyang 辛清扬	China	May 29, 1997 (age 29)	
028	Zhangyu Qiujing 章于秋晶	China	November 1, 1990 (age 35)	B
029	Liu Qianyu 刘阡羽	China		A
030	Cheng Jiaxin 程嘉欣	China		
031	Liu Shixuan 刘诗璇	China	October 12, 1991 (age 34)	D
032	Chen Yeling 陈叶玲	China	October 6, 1997 (age 28)	
033	Zhu Jiaxi 朱佳希	China	March 8, 1991 (age 35)	C
034	Xiao Xianer 小仙儿	China		C
036	Liu Nian 刘恋	China	June 15, 1998 (age 28)	
038	Wang Yi 王艺	China		
039	Song Jiayi 宋佳仪	China		
040	Dong Siyi 董思怡	China	November 7, 1995 (age 30)	
041	Yu Ziyan 余紫妍	China	July 4, 1994 (age 32)	C
042	Jiang Yu 蒋语	China	February 11, 1998 (age 28)	C
044	Gui Ningxi 桂凝希	China	November 9, 1997 (age 28)	
045	Xu Xinwen 许馨文	China		A
046	Chen Zeyu 谌泽雨	China		A
047	Chen Qiuyu 陈秋雨	China	9月29日	A
048	He XingFyu 和星妤	China	July 20, 1998 (age 28)	A
049	Zhou Yuyang 周昱杨	China	September 26, 1997 (age 28)	C
050	Gao Jiayi 高佳依	China		
051	Zhu Tingchen 朱庭辰	China	January 12, 1994 (age 32)	C
052	Lu Enxin 陆恩馨	China	October 14, 1994 (age 31)	
053	Jiang Dan 姜丹	China		A
054	Zhang Jiaxin 张嘉欣	China		C
055	Sun Yali 孙雅丽	China		
057	Wang Yiqi 王伊祁	China		
058	Wu Haha 吴哈哈	China		B
059	Liu Danmeng 劉丹萌	China	July 19, 1991 (age 35)	B
060	Yang Mingyao 杨茗遥	China	August 22, 1995 (age 31)	
062	Li Shanyuan 李善愿	Taiwan		
063	Cheng Mo 程茉	Taiwan		C
064	Jin Ruoyan 金若琰	China		
066	Wang Yihan 王一菡	China		
067	Mi Chenchen 米晨晨	China	October 15, 1996 (age 29)	B
068	Pan Xueying 潘雪莹	China	October 28, 1996 (age 29)	A
072	Xu Yiyang 徐艺洋	China	September 12, 1997 (age 28)	C
074	Wang Zhiyan 王芷嫣	China		D
075	Li Yijie 李依婕	China	February 24, 1997 (age 29)	
076	Shi Xiaoyu 石小钰	China	January 14, 1998 (age 28)	
077	Ni Qiuyun 倪秋雲	China	March 26, 1995 (age 31)	D

=== Male ===
Contestants
Number	Name	Nationality	Date of birth	Grade
101	Hu Xiaoling 胡潇灵	China	March 18, 1994 (age 32)	
102	Zhang Yihang 张一航	China	September 9, 1998 (age 27)	
103	Zhang Chao 张超	China	May 11, 1998 (age 28)	
104	Ying Chengxi 英承晞	Taiwan		C
105	Ming Liang 铭亮	China		
106	Ren Hao 任豪	China	July 17, 1995 (age 31)	C
107	Shi Jiapeng 石佳鹏	China	September 7, 1999 (age 26)	D
108	Dong Ziming 董子鸣	China	March 27, 2000 (age 26)	C
109	Jiang Tingkai 蒋霆凯	China	September 19, 1993 (age 32)	B
110	Li Jiajie 李嘉捷	China	February 9, 1997 (age 29)	B
111	Lu Siheng 陆思恒	China	June 9, 1993 (age 33)	C
113	Xier Zhati 西尔扎提	China	March 18, 1995 (age 31)	
114	Gao Yuchen 高雨晨	China	August 13, 1996 (age 30)	
115	Raymond 雷蒙	TaiwanPhilippines		C
116	Lu Chenyu 吕晨瑜	China	November 14, 1998 (age 27)	A
117	Luo Jie 罗杰	China	July 19, 1998 (age 28)	A
118	Yang Haoming 杨昊铭	China	November 5, 1999 (age 26)	A
119	He Kailun 何凯伦	China		A
120	Zhu Minrui 朱敏睿	China	January 8, 1997 (age 29)	B
121	Wang Jichao 王骥超	China		A
122	Liu Yuzhong 刘羽中	China	October 24, 1996 (age 29)	D
123	Liang Bowen 梁博文	China	March 30, 1996 (age 30)	
124	Liu Keshuai 刘克帅	China	March 12, 1995 (age 31)	D
125	Wu Zhongyuan 伍中元	China浙江		C
126	Chen Zihua 陈子华	ChinaAustralia		
127	Ding Li 丁立	China	1997	C
128	Li Jiaxiang 李嘉祥	China		
130	Meng Shi 孟适	China	November 2, 1997 (age 28)	
133	Yang Xiaodong 杨晓东	China	December 22, 1994 (age 31)	
134	Hou Jinyao 侯锦尧	China	February 14, 2000 (age 26)	B
135	Xu Junjie 徐俊杰	Taiwan		A
137	Yin Cong 寅聪	China		B
138	Yu Jie 宇杰	China	April 24, 1993 (age 33)	
140	Huang Zonghui 黄宗辉	China		B
141	Li Zhijie 李志杰	China	June 5, 1994 (age 32)	
142	Hong Yulei 洪雨雷	China	January 22, 1997 (age 29)	
143	Ruan Zeyi 阮泽轶	China		A
144	Pan Xingyu 潘星宇	China	May 8, 1998 (age 28)	A
145	Wang Yiran 王一然	China		D
146	Zhao Fangzhou 趙方舟	China		
147	Wang Guangyun 王广允	China	July 16, 1996 (age 30)	A
148	Heer Lijun 苛尔力钧	China	April 28, 1995 (age 31)	A
149	Bogu Yuguang 波谷御光	China		C
150	Zuo Boqi 左其铂	China	January 19, 1992 (age 34)	C
153	Rou Guoqing 柔国庆	China	October 1, 1999 (age 26)	
154	Hu Xuchen 胡旭晨	China		
155	Ding Yunjia 丁韵嘉	China		
156	Wang Yaochen 王耀晨	China		
157	Ma Chao 马超	China	August 18, 1995 (age 31)	
158	Luo Qicong 罗启聪	China		
159	Zhou Yingting 周殷廷	China		

== Round 1 : Selections ==
In this round, contestants first danced inside individual 'lifts' on stage in groups of 3. Only those who did not get 2 or more 'red arrows' by the mentors get the chance to exit the lift and sing a song of their choice. Contestants who managed to get all 3 'green arrows' from the mentors after singing will then successfully join the team.

Once all 7 seats in the group have been filled, further contestants who get 3 'green arrows' will have to replace an existing contestant, either by the mentors' decision or by audience voting if the mentors cannot reach a unanimous decision.

Throughout the show, each mentor has one single chance to use a 'golden button' to retain any contestant within the team.

=== Episode 1 (broadcast date : 21 October 2018) ===
Order	Male Team		Female Team	
Order	Contestant	Result	Contestant	Result
1	He Kailun 何凯伦	IN	Jiang Dan 姜丹	IN
2	Jiang Tingkai 蔣霆凱	OUT	Zhou Liyang 周昱杨	IN
3	Lu Siheng 陸思恆	OUT	Xiao Wu 小伍	IN
4	Wang Yiran 王一然	OUT	Jiang He 姜賀	OUT
5	Yang Haoming 杨昊铭	IN	Chen Zeyu 諶澤宇	OUT
6	Huang Zonghui 黃宗輝	OUT	Zhang Jiaxin 張嘉欣	OUT
7	Pan Xingyu 潘星宇	OUT	Liu Qianyu 刘阡羽	IN
8	Dong Ziming 董子鳴	OUT	Zhangyu Qiujing 章于秋晶	OUT
9	Ren Hao 任豪	OUT	Zhu Jiaxi 朱佳希	OUT

=== Episode 2 (broadcast date : 28 October 2018) ===
Order	Male Team		Female Team	
Order	Contestant	Result	Contestant	Result
1	Heer Lijun 苛尔力钧	IN	Xu Xinwen 许馨文	IN
2	Zhu Minrui 朱敏睿	OUT	Chen Jiaxin 陈嘉歆	IN
3	Xier Zhati 西爾札提	OUT	Wu Jingyi 吳靜怡	OUT
4	Wang Jichao 王驥超	OUT	Xu Yiyang 徐艺洋	IN
5	Bogu Yuguang 波谷御光	OUT	He Xinyu 和星妤	IN
6	Li Jiajie 李嘉捷	IN	Wang Linqing 汪林晴	OUT
7	Ruan Zeyi 阮澤軼	IN	Zhang Jingwei 張婧薇	OUT
8	Ying Cong 寅聰	OUT	Lin Junyi 林君怡	IN
9	Gao Yuchen 高雨晨	OUT	Yang Mingyao 楊茗遙	OUT

- Zhou Liyang and Liu Qianyu were eliminated in this episode as the Female team has exceeded 7 members.

=== Episode 3 (broadcast date : 4 November 2018) ===
Order	Male Team		Female Team	
Order	Contestant	Result	Contestant	Result
1	Lu Chenyu 呂晨瑜	OUT	Cheng Mo 程茉	OUT
2	Ding Li 丁力	IN	Yu Ziyan 余紫妍	IN
3	Shi Jiapeng 石佳鹏	IN	Zhu Tingchen 朱庭辰	OUT
4	Luo Jie 罗杰	IN	Chen Leyi 陈乐一	IN
5	Raymond 雷蒙	IN	Wu Haha 吳哈哈	OUT
6	Wu Zhongyuan 伍中元	OUT	Xu Ziyin 徐紫茵	IN

- Li Jiajie was eliminated in this episode as the Male team has exceeded 7 members.
- Xu Yiyang, Jiang Dan and Chen Jiaxin were eliminated in this episode as the Female team has exceeded 7 members.
- Shi Jiapeng was accepted as the 8th member of the Male team by mentor William Chan's golden button.

=== Episode 4 (broadcast date : 11 November 2018) ===
Order	Male Team		Female Team	
Order	Contestant	Result	Contestant	Result
1	Ming Liang 铭亮	IN	Yang Han 楊晗	OUT
2	Li Zhijie 李志杰	OUT	Gu Libo 菇力帕	OUT
3	Hong Yulei 洪雨雷	OUT	Xiao Xianer 小仙儿	IN
4	Xu Junjie 徐俊杰	OUT	Wu Zhuofan 吴卓凡	IN
5	Zuo Qibo 左其铂	IN	Xi Yu 席宇	OUT
6	Zhang Chao 張超	OUT	Liu Shixuan 劉詩璇	OUT
7	Wang Guangyun 王廣允	IN	-	-
8	Liu Keshuai 劉克帥	OUT	-	-
9	Liu Yuzhong 劉羽中	OUT	-	-

- Heer Lijun and Raymond were eliminated in this episode as the Male team has exceeded 8 members.
- Xiao Wu and He Xingyu were eliminated in this episode as the Female team has exceeded 7 members.

=== Episode 5 (broadcast date : 18 November 2018) ===
Order	Male Team		Female Team	
Order	Contestant	Result	Contestant	Result
1	Hu Xiaoling 胡瀟靈	OUT	Shu Shu 舒舒	OUT
2	Yang Xiaodong 楊曉東	OUT	Zhu Kejia 朱可佳	IN
3	Hou Jinyao 侯錦堯	IN	Jiang Yu 蒋语	IN
4	-	-	Qu Xue 曲雪	IN
5	-	-	Liu Danmeng 劉丹萌	OUT
6	-	-	Mi Chenchen 米晨晨	OUT

- Zuo Qibo and Shi Jiapeng were eliminated in this episode as the Male team has exceeded 7 members.
- Hou Jinrao was accepted as the 8th member of the Male team by mentor G.E.M.'s golden button.
- Xu Ziyin, Yu Ziyan and Zhu Kejia were eliminated in this episode as the Female team has exceeded 7 members.

=== Episode 6 (broadcast date : 25 November 2018) ===
Order	Male Team		Female Team	
Order	Contestant	Result	Contestant	Result
1	-	-	Ni Qiuyun 倪秋云	IN
2	-	-	Pan Xueying 潘雪莹	OUT
3	-	-	Xie Keyin 谢可寅	IN
4	Hu Xuchen 胡旭晨	OUT	Zhou Xue 周雪	IN
5	Ding Yunjia 丁韵嘉	OUT	Chen Qiuyu 陈秋雨	OUT
6	Zhou Yinting 周殷廷	OUT	Li Tianyun 李天韵	OUT
7	Luo Qicong 罗启聪	OUT	Yang Meiqi 楊美琪	OUT
8	Wang Yaochen 王耀晨	OUT	Yang Meiling 楊美玲	OUT
9	-	-	Wang Zhiyan 王芷嫣	IN

- Ni Qiuyun and Wang Zhiyan were accepted as the 8th and 9th member of the Female team by mentors Victoria Song's and Kris Wu's golden buttons respectively.
- He Kailun was eliminated in this episode as the Male team has exceeded 7 members.
- Ni Qiuyun, Jiang Yu, Qu Xue and Xu Xinwen were eliminated in this episode as the Female team has exceeded 7 members.

== Round 2 : Eliminations ==
In this round, the male and female teams battle against each other with 3 performances in each episode. The losing team will then have one member from their team in the elimination stand, who will potentially be replaced by a substitute member.

=== Episode 7 (broadcast date : 2 December 2018) ===
- Joey Yung was invited as a guest mentor for the male team due to G.E.M.'s scheduling issues.

Order	Male Team	Points awarded	Female Team	Points awarded
1 Team battle	Yang Haoming 楊昊銘; Wang Guangyun 王廣允; Ruan Zeyi 阮澤軼; Luo Jie 羅杰; Ming Liang 銘亮; Ding Li 丁立; Hou Jinyao 侯锦尧	5	Zhou Xue 周雪; Wu Zhuofan 吳卓凡; Lin Junyi 林君怡; Chen Leyi 陳樂一; Xiao Xianer 小仙兒; Xie Keyin 谢可寅; Wang Zhiyan 王芷嫣	2
2 Duet battle	Wang Guangyun 王廣允; Ruan Zeyi 阮澤軼	2	Wu Zhuofan 吳卓凡; Lin Junyi 林君怡	5
3 Solo battle	Yang Haoming 楊昊銘	5	Zhou Xue 周雪	2
Total points	WON	12	LOST	9

- As the Male team won 12 points vs 9 points in this episode, Wang Zhiyan 王芷嫣 from the female team was selected to stand in the elimination stand. Liu Danmeng 劉丹萌 was selected to replace Wang Zhiyan 王芷嫣 as a contesting member.
- Hu Xiaoling 胡潇灵 was selected as the substitute member for the Male Team, while Liu Danmeng 劉丹萌 and Xu Yiyang 徐艺洋 for the Female Team. (Note: Female Team can select 2 substitute members as Xie Keying won the week's MVP.)

=== Episode 8 (broadcast date : 9 December 2018) ===
- Zhao Yingjun was invited as a guest mentor for the male team due to Hu Haiquan's scheduling issues.

Order	Male Team	Points awarded	Female Team	Points awarded
1 Team battle	Yang Haoming 楊昊銘; Wang Guangyun 王廣允; Ruan Zeyi 阮澤軼; Luo Jie 羅杰; Ming Liang 銘亮; Ding Li 丁立; Hou Jinyao 侯锦尧	6	Zhou Xue 周雪; Wu Zhuofan 吳卓凡; Lin Junyi 林君怡; Chen Leyi 陳樂一; Xiao Xianer 小仙兒; Xie Keyin 谢可寅; Liu Danmeng 刘丹萌	1
2 Group battle	Hou Jinyao 侯锦尧; Wang Guangyun 王廣允	2	Xiao Xianer 小仙兒; Zhou Xue 周雪; Xie Keyin 谢可寅	5
3 Solo battle	Ming Liang 銘亮	4	Liu Danmeng 刘丹萌	3
Total points	WON	12	LOST	9

- As the Male team won again with 12 points vs 9 points in this episode, Wang Zhiyan 王芷嫣 from the Female team was selected as the member from the team to be eliminated. For the next episode, Xu Yiyang 徐艺洋 was selected to replace Zhou Xue as a contesting member.

=== Episode 9 (broadcast date : 16 December 2018) ===
Order	Male Team	Points awarded	Female Team	Points awarded
1 Team battle	Yang Haoming 楊昊銘; Wang Guangyun 王廣允; Ruan Zeyi 阮澤軼; Luo Jie 羅杰; Ming Liang 銘亮; Ding Li 丁立; Hou Jinyao 侯锦尧	5	Wu Zhuofan 吳卓凡; Lin Junyi 林君怡; Chen Leyi 陳樂一; Xiao Xianer 小仙兒; Xie Keyin 谢可寅; Liu Danmeng 刘丹萌; Xu Yiyang 徐艺洋	2
2 Group battle	Ming Liang 銘亮; Wang Guangyun 王廣允; Luo Jie 羅杰	4	Liu Danmeng 刘丹萌; Xie Keyin 谢可寅	3
3 Final battle	Ding Li 丁立	4	Wu Zhuofan 吳卓凡; Xiao Xianer 小仙兒	3
Total points	WON	13	LOST	8

- As the Male team won again in this episode, Zhou Xue 周雪 was selected as the member from the female team to be eliminated.

=== Episode 10 (broadcast date : 23 December 2018) ===
- Zheng Kai was invited as a guest mentor for the female team due to Kris Wu's scheduling issues.

Order	Male Team	Points awarded	Female Team	Points awarded
1 Team battle	Yang Haoming 楊昊銘; Wang Guangyun 王廣允; Ruan Zeyi 阮澤軼; Luo Jie 羅杰; Ming Liang 銘亮; Ding Li 丁立; Hou Jinyao 侯锦尧	6	Wu Zhuofan 吳卓凡; Lin Junyi 林君怡; Chen Leyi 陳樂一; Xiao Xianer 小仙兒; Xie Keyin 谢可寅; Liu Danmeng 刘丹萌; Xu Yiyang 徐艺洋	1
2 Group battle	Yang Haoming 楊昊銘; Ming Liang 銘亮; Ding Li 丁立	5	Wu Zhuofan 吳卓凡; Xie Keyin 谢可寅; Xu Yiyang 徐艺洋	2
3 Final battle	Hou Jinyao 侯锦尧; Wang Guangyun 王廣允; Luo Jie 羅杰	4	Chen Leyi 陳樂一	3
Total points	WON	15	LOST	6

- As the Male team won again in this episode, Xiao Xianer 小仙兒 was selected as the member from the female team to be eliminated.

=== Episode 11 (broadcast date : 30 December 2018) ===
- Zheng Kai and Tia Ray were invited as a guest mentors for the female team due to Kris Wu's and Victoria Song's scheduling issues.

Order	Male Team	Points awarded	Female Team	Points awarded
1 Team battle	Yang Haoming 楊昊銘; Wang Guangyun 王廣允; Ruan Zeyi 阮澤軼; Luo Jie 羅杰; Ming Liang 銘亮; Ding Li 丁立; Hou Jinyao 侯锦尧 (with G.E.M.)	1	Wu Zhuofan 吳卓凡; Lin Junyi 林君怡; Chen Leyi 陳樂一; Xie Keyin 谢可寅; Liu Danmeng 刘丹萌; Xu Yiyang 徐艺洋 (with Bibi Zhou)	6
2 Group battle	Hou Jinyao 侯锦尧; Ming Liang 銘亮	6	Wu Zhuofan 吳卓凡; Liu Danmeng 刘丹萌; Xu Yiyang 徐艺洋	1
3 Final battle	Ruan Zeyi 阮澤軼; Yang Haoming 楊昊銘 (with Hu Haiquan)	3	Lin Junyi 林君怡; Chen Leyi 陳樂一; Xie Keyin 谢可寅 (with Tia Ray)	4
Total points	LOST	10	WON	11

- As the Female team won for the first time in this episode, Luo Jie 羅杰 was selected to stand in elimination stand. Hu Xiaoling 胡潇灵 was selected to replace Luo Jie 羅杰 as a contesting member. (Note: As Male Team lost the first round, all members were to stay in elimination stand. After winning the second round, Jinyao and Ming Liang chose to rescue Luo Jie. After losing overall, a member have to be chosen to remain in the stand while the rest can return. Mentors chose Luo Jie and Wang Guangyun to battle, and Luo Jie lost, resulting him in becoming a substitute member.)

== Final Round ==
=== Episode 12 (broadcast date : 6 January 2019) ===
Order	Male Team	Points awarded	Female Team	Points awarded
1 Team battle	Yang Haoming 楊昊銘; Wang Guangyun 王廣允; Ruan Zeyi 阮澤軼; Ming Liang 銘亮; Ding Li 丁立; Hou Jinyao 侯锦尧; Hu Xiaoling 胡潇灵	4	Wu Zhuofan 吳卓凡; Lin Junyi 林君怡; Chen Leyi 陳樂一; Xie Keyin 谢可寅; Liu Danmeng 刘丹萌; Xu Yiyang 徐艺洋	3
2 Group battle	Ruan Zeyi 阮澤軼; Wang Guangyun 王廣允; Luo Jie 羅杰 (with William Chan)	6	Xu Yiyang 徐艺洋; Wu Zhuofan 吳卓凡 (with Kris Wu)	1
3 Group battle	Yang Haoming 楊昊銘; Ding Li 丁立; Hu Xiaoling 胡潇灵 (with Hu Haiquan)	1	Xie Keyin 谢可寅; Chen Leyi 陳樂一 (with Bibi Zhou)	6
4 Group battle	Hou Jinyao 侯锦尧; Ming Liang 銘亮 (with G.E.M.)	5	Lin Junyi 林君怡; Liu Danmeng 刘丹萌 (with Victoria Song)	2
Total points	WON	16	LOST	12

As the Male Team won in this final round, one of its members gets to be the MVP of the year. Yang Haoming 楊昊銘 was eventually voted to be the MVP of the year, beating second placed Wang Guangyun 王廣允 and third placed Hou Jinyao 侯锦尧.

== Teams ==
=== Round Two ===
#	Episode 7		Episode 8		Episode 9	
#	Male Team	Female Team	Male Team	Female Team	Male Team	Female Team
1	Yang Haoming	Lin Junyi	Yang Haoming	Lin Junyi	Yang Haoming	Lin Junyi
2	Ruan Zeyi	Chen Leyi	Ruan Zeyi	Chen Leyi	Ruan Zeyi	Chen Leyi
3	Ding Li	Xiao Xianer	Ding Li	Xiao Xianer	Ding Li	Xiao Xianer
4	Luo Jie	Wu Zhuofan	Luo Jie	Wu Zhuofan	Luo Jie	Wu Zhuofan
5	Ming Liang	Xie Keyin	Ming Liang	Xie Keyin	Ming Liang	Xie Keyin
6	Wang Guangyun	Zhou Xue	Wang Guangyun	Zhou Xue	Wang Guangyun	Liu Danmeng
7	Hou Jinyao	Wang Zhiyan	Hou Jinyao	Liu Danmeng	Hou Jinyao	Xu Yiyang
Substitute members	Hu Xiaoling	Liu Danmeng	Hu Xiaoling	Xu Yiyang	Hu Xiaoling	Zhou Xue
Substitute members	–	Xu Yiyang	–	Wang Zhiyan	–	–

#	Episode 10		Episode 11		Episode 12	
#	Male Team	Female Team	Male Team	Female Team	Male Team	Female Team
1	Yang Haoming	Lin Junyi	Yang Haoming	Lin Junyi	Yang Haoming	Lin Junyi
2	Ruan Zeyi	Chen Leyi	Ruan Zeyi	Chen Leyi	Ruan Zeyi	Chen Leyi
3	Ding Li	Xiao Xianer	Ding Li	Wu Zhuofan	Ding Li	Wu Zhuofan
4	Luo Jie	Wu Zhuofan	Luo Jie	Xie Keyin	Ming Liang	Xie Keyin
5	Ming Liang	Xie Keyin	Ming Liang	Liu Danmeng	Wang Guangyun	Liu Danmeng
6	Wang Guangyun	Liu Danmeng	Wang Guangyun	Xu Yiyang	Hou Jinyao	Xu Yiyang
7	Hou Jinyao	Xu Yiyang	Hou Jinyao	–	Hu Xiaoling	–
Substitute members	Hu Xiaoling	–	Hu Xiaoling	–	Luo Jie	–
