= Zhao Yue =

Chinese singer (born 1995)

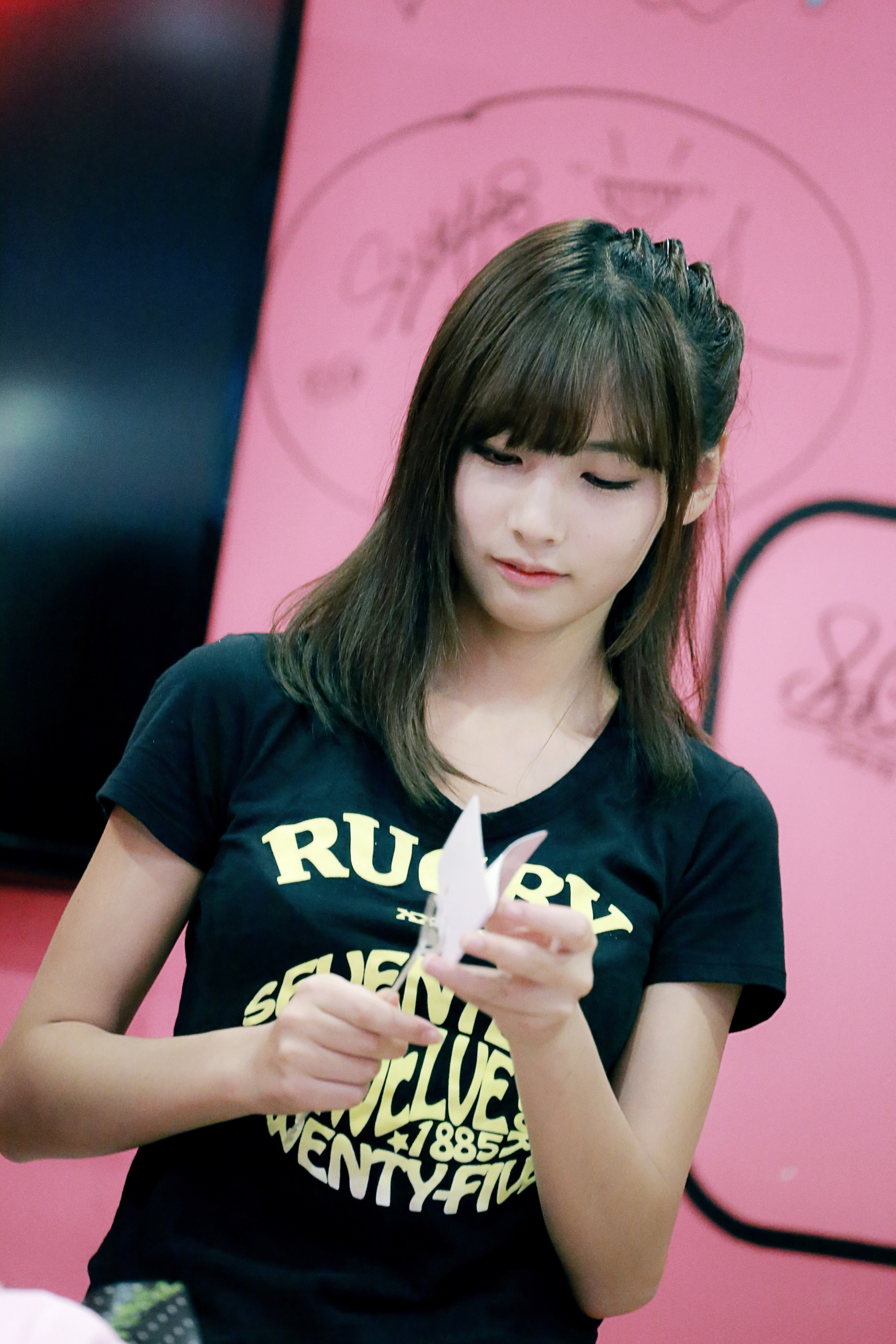
- Zhao in 2020
- Born: April 29, 1995 (age 31); Wuhan, Hubei, China
- Occupations: Singer; dancer; actress
- Years active: 2013–present
- Musical career
- Origin: Shaoguan, Guangdong, China
- Genres: Pop; Mandopop; K-pop; J-pop
- Instrument: Vocals
- Labels: Star48; Ninestyle Model Agency; Ninestyle Music; Wajijiwa
- Formerly of: SNH48; 7Senses; BonBon Girls 303

Chinese name
- Traditional Chinese: 趙粵
- Simplified Chinese: 赵粤
Transcriptions
Standard Mandarin
- Hanyu Pinyin: Zhào Yuè

Zhao Yue (simplified Chinese: 赵粤; traditional Chinese: 趙粵; pinyin: Zhào Yuè; English: Akira Zhao, born 29 April 1995) is a Chinese singer. She was a member of Team NII of Chinese girl group SNH48, and its sub-unit 7Senses, she graduated from the group on September 11, 2022. She was also a member of Chinese girl group BonBon Girls 303 after finishing second in the reality show Produce Camp 2020, the group disbanded on July 4, 2022. In September of the same year, Zhao Yue officially graduated from SNH48 and established her personal studio, embarking on a new phase of her individual career. Since then, she has shifted her focus to the film and television industry. In October 2023, the detective short drama The Rookie Female Detective, in which she starred, premiered. In March 2024, the romantic comedy Handsome Guys Not Allowed, also starring her, was released. On April 29, 2025, she announced her contract termination with Star48 Culture & Media through a live broadcast.

== Career ==
On 18 August 2013, Zhao was among the 34 shortlisted candidates for second-generation members of SNH48, and was promoted to Team NII on 11 November. On 16 November, she participated in SNH48's first major concert, "SNH48 Guangzhou Concert", held in the Guangzhou International Sports Arena.

On 18 January 2014, Zhao participated in SNH48's Red and White Concert.

On 31 January 2015, Zhao performed at the Request Hour Setlist Best 30 2015 Concert, of which her performance of "Itoshisa no Accel" was ranked 5th. On 25 July, during SNH48's second general election, she was ranked 11th with 25,245 votes. On 1 October, she starred in Balala the Fairies: Princess Camellia.

On 20 April 2016, Zhao was announced as one of the members of SNH48's sub-unit, 7SENSES. On 19 June, she participated in the filming of Heroes of Remix. On 30 July, Zhao Yue was ranked ninth with 47,563.5 votes during SNH48's third general election.

On 7 January 2017, she participated in SNH48's third Request Time, of which her song "Don't Touch", performed with Ju Jingyi and Zeng Yanfen, came in first. On 7 April 2017, as the lead dancer of 7SENSES, Zhao and the other members of 7SENSES made their debut showcase in Shanghai and released their first EP Seven Sen7es. On 1 May 2017, Zhao starred in TV drama Judo High. On 29 July 2017, Zhao was ranked 7th with 90,929.7 votes during SNH48's fourth general election. On 5 November 2017, Zhao won the Best Star Award with 7SENSES in 2nd Asia Artist Awards.

On 28 July 2018, Zhao was ranked 6th with 100,522.08 votes during SNH48's fifth general election.

Zhao did not participate in the finals of SNH48's sixth general election in 2019.

In 2020, Zhao joined Chinese competition variety show series Produce Camp 2020 (also known as Chuang 2020) as a contestant. In the finale aired on 4 July 2020, Zhao finished in 2nd place, securing her place in the debut group BonBon Girls 303.

On July 4, 2022, Hard Candy Girl 303's contract expires. The next day, Siba Media announced that after completing the graduation process within the SNH48 group, Zhao Yue will develop in parallel as an artist signed by Siba Media and as a member of 7SENSES. Zhao officially graduated from SNH48 on September 11, 2022, and her contract with Star48 ended on April 29, 2025.

== Discography ==
=== Singles ===
List of singles, showing year released, selected chart positions, and name of the album
Title	Year	Peak (TME Uni Chart)		Album
Title	Year	CHN	Score	Album
"Phoenix (Dance)"	2022	—	—	Non-album singles
"Trail of Light (Cantonese Version)"	2022	—	—	Non-album singles

== SNH48 activities ==
=== Singles ===
Year	No.	Title	Type	Notes
2013	3	"Fortune Cookie of Love"	B-side	
2014	4	"Heart Electric"	B-side	
2014	5	"Uza"	B-side	
2015	6	"Give Me Five!"	A-side	
2015	7	"After Rain"	B-side	
2015	8	"Manatsu no Sounds Good!"	A-side	
2015	9	"Halloween Night"	A-side	
2015	10	"New Year's Bell"	B-side	
2016	11	"Engine of Youth"	A-side	First original single
2016	12	"Dream Land"	A-side	Second original single
2016	13	"Princess's Cloak"	A-side	
2016	14	"Happy Wonder World"	B-side	
2017	15	"Each Other's Future"	B-side	
2017	16	"Summer Pirates"	B-side	Sang on "Limited season" as part of Team NII
2017	17	"Dawn in Naples"	A-side	
2017	18	"Sweet Festival"	B-side	Sang on "Good Luck" with SNH48

=== With 7Senses ===
- Seven Sen7es (April 7, 2017)
- Chapter: Blooming (November 20, 2017)
- Swan (December 12, 2018)
- New Plan (November 4, 2019)
- Crazy For You (January 9, 2022)

==== Albums ====
- Mae Shika Mukanee (2014)

=== SNH48 stage units ===
Stage No.	Song	Notes
Team NII 1st Stage "Theater no Megami"	Arashi no Yoru ni wa 暴风雨之夜	With Chen Jiaying, Lu Ting and Feng Xinduo
Team NII 2nd Stage "Saka Agari"	End Roll 曲终人散	With Xu Yanyu, Feng Xinduo and Gong Shiqi
Team NII 3rd Stage "Mokugekisha"	Itoshisa no Accel 爱的加速器	Solo song
Team NII 4th Stage "Boku no Taiyou"	Boku to Juliet to Jet Coaster 朱丽叶	With Huang Tingting and Dong Yanyun
Team NII 5th Stage "Exclusive Party"	Daydream 白日梦	With Chen Wenyan, Zhou Yi, Luo Lan and Wang Xiaojia
Team NII 5th Stage "In the Name of Love"	Fire Touch	With Wan Lina, Chen Jiaying, Jin Yingyue

=== Concert units ===
Year	Date	Name	Song	Notes
2013	16 November	Guangzhou Concert	None	
2014	18 January	Kouhaku Utagassen 2014	Hatsukoi Dorobou 初恋小偷	With Lin Siyi and Gong Shiqi
2014	26 July	SNH48 Sousenkyo Concert in Shanghai	None	
2015	31 January	Request Hour Setlist Best 30 2015	Itoshisa no Accel 爱的加速器	Solo song
2015	25 July	2nd General Election Concert	None	
2015	26 December	Request Hour Setlist Best 30 2015 (2nd Edition)	None	
2016	30 July	3rd General Election Concert	Don't touch	With Lu Ting and Feng Xinduo
2017	7 January	Request Hour Setlist Best 50 (3rd Edition)	Don't touch	With Ju Jingyi and Zeng Yanfen
2017	29 July	Fourth General Election Concert	Dream	With Mohan and Lin Siyi

== Filmography ==
=== Television films ===
Year	Title	Role	Notes
2015	Balala the Fairies: Princess Camellia 巴啦啦小魔仙之魔箭公主	Kai Mei Li	Main Role
2020	Hey! Little Bones 嘿！小骨头	Jia Lan	Supporting Role

=== Television series ===
Year	Title	Role	Notes
2017	Stairway to Stardom 逆袭之星途璀璨	Mandy	Supporting Role
2018	Judo High 热血高校	Lin Jian	Main Role
TBA	Intership Detective 吃瓜神探	TBA	Main Role

=== Variety shows ===
Year	Title	Channel	Date	Notes
2013	The Coser 看我72变	Shanghai Media Group	12 October	
2013	China's Got Talent 中国达人秀	Dragon Television	15 December	
2014	X-Shine 炫动漫	Shanghai Media Group	9 February	
2014	Shang High School 48 上海学院48	TV Asahi Online	11 April-29 August	
2014	The Kids Are All Right 鸡蛋碰石头	Xiamen TV	20 April	
2014	SNHello	Tudou, Youku	11 July-26 September	
2015	学长驾到	Toonmax Television	10 July	With Li Yitong, Yi Jia'ai, Dong Yanyun, Feng Xinduo and Zhang Yuxin
2015	Weekly News Girl SNH48 周刊少女SNH48	AcFun	3 October	
2015	GF Dream Challenge 高夫梦想挑战秀	Tencent	27 October	
2015	乐弹乐有料	Tencent	3 November	
2015	You Show 优叻个秀	Youku	4 December	
2016	Crazy Magic 疯狂的麦咭	Hunan Television	16 January	With Ju Jingyi, Lin Siyi and Feng Xinduo
2016	I Am A Great Beauty 我是大美人	Hunan Television	23 March	
2016	Toshiba Surprise Pool 东芝心跳泳池	AcFun	16 April	
2016	乐见大牌	QQLive	22 April	
2016	Top Star App 星APP风云榜	Tencent	2 June	
2016	Heroes of Remix 盖世英雄	Jiangsu Television	19 June-14 August	In Psy's team
2016	Happy Camp 快乐大本营	Hunan Television	10 September	With Top 16
2016	Yo! Idol 哟！爱豆	NetEase	28 October	With Huang Tingting, Zeng Yanfen and Wan Lina
2016	Push The Button 全家好拍档	CCTV-3	17 December	
2018	Sweet Food Season 3 蜜食记第3季	Anhui TV	17 June	With Feng Xinduo and Wan Lina
2018	Dream Studio 48 梦想演播厅	iQiyi	8 July	
2018	Super Nova Games 超新星全运会第1季	Tencent Video	1 November-22 November	
2019	2019粉丝嘉年华	Tencent Video	14 July	
2020	Produce Camp 2020 创造营2020	Tencent Video	2 May-4 July	Contestant - finished 2nd place
2020	We Are Blazing 炙热的我们	Tencent Video	23 July	With Bonbon Girls 303
2020	Super Novae Games Season 3 超新星全运会第3季	Tencent Video	31 July-16 August	With Bonbon Girls 303
2020	Youth Periplous Season 2 青春环游记第2季	Hunan TV	8 August	With Bonbon Girls 303
2020	The Coming One - Super Band 明日之子乐团季	Tencent Video	29 August	With Bonbon Girls 303
2020	Crossover Singer Season 5 跨界歌王第	Beijing TV	1 October	With Bonbon Girls 303
2020	女团的offer	Tencent Video	unconfirmed	With Bonbon Girls 303
