= List of Chuang Asia: Thailand contestants =

Chuang Asia: Thailand is a Chinese/Thai reality competition show. It is the fifth installment in the Chuang franchise and first in the Chuang Asia series.

== Contestants ==
Color key

Top 9
Final members of Gen1es
Eliminated in the first ranking announcement
Eliminated in the second ranking announcement
Eliminated in the third ranking announcement
Eliminated in the final ranking announcement
Contestants saved from eliminated
Left the show
Not shown

Company	Nationality	Name	Initial Evaluation		Theme Song Evaluation	Rankings																						
Company	Nationality	Name	Initial Evaluation		Theme Song Evaluation	Episode 2		Episode 3		Episode 4			Episode 5		Episode 6				Episode 7		Episode 8		Episode 9		Episode 10			
Company	Nationality	Name	Initial Evaluation		Theme Song Evaluation	Mid	End	Mid	End	Midweek		End	Episode 5		Midweek			End	Episode 7		Mid	End	Episode 9		Midweek		End	
Company	Nationality	Name	Initial Evaluation		Theme Song Evaluation	Mid	End	Mid	End	Feb 20	Feb 22	End	Episode 5		Mar 3	Mar 5	Mar 7	End	Episode 7		Mid	End	Episode 9		Apr 2	Apr 5	End	
Company	Nationality	Name	#	Class	Theme Song Evaluation	#	#	#	#	#	#	#	#	Vote	#	#	#	#	#	Vote	#	#	#	Vote	#	#	#	Vote
Individual Trainees	Thailand	Acare (Note: Full name: Chompoopuntip Temtanamongkol (ชมพูพันธุ์ทิพย์ เต็มธนมงคล)) (เอคอร์)	46	F	F	8	7	7	7	10		15	13	212,302		27		28	29	260,298	25	27	28	1,235,667	Eliminated			
Individual Trainees	Thailand	Chaba (Note: Full name: Kritima Jangsawad (กฤติมา แจ้งสวัสดิ์)) (ชบา)	17	B	B		32		49		57	58	56	Eliminated														
Individual Trainees	Thailand	Jasmine (Note: Full name: Krittiyaluksana Chuthawaranon (กฤติยาลักษณ์ จุฑาวรานนท์)) (จัสมิน)	45	F	F		21		24		31	36	33	164,169	18	17	17	16	21	446,692	12	14	21	2,899,909	Eliminated			
Individual Trainees	Thailand	Ninnint (Note: Full name: Suthicha Kanjana (สุฐิชา กาญจนะ)) (Note: Ninnint was a contestant on Cosmos.) (นิ่นนิ้น)	64	F	B		62		67		62	62	57	31,694		33		35	36	100,007	29	29	29	633,134	Eliminated			
Individual Trainees	Thailand	Ray (Note: Full name: Venita Loywattanakul (เวณิตา ลอยวัฒนกุล)) (เรย์)	57	F	F		47		58		50	52	50	Eliminated														
4November Entertainment (โฟร์โนเว็มเบอร์ เอ็นเตอร์เทนเม้นท์)	Thailand	Kanompang (Note: Full name: Pateera Norkaew (ปฏีรา หน่อแก้ว)) (ขนมปัง)	15	B	A		43		47		28	25	38	Eliminated														
4November Entertainment (โฟร์โนเว็มเบอร์ เอ็นเตอร์เทนเม้นท์)	Thailand	Panda (Note: Full name: Nattanicha Phattharasunthornwong (ณัฏฐณิชา ภัทรสุนทรวงศ์)) (แพนด้า)	29	B	F		35		46		27	32	31	164,887		32		33	35	125,680	Eliminated							
4November Entertainment (โฟร์โนเว็มเบอร์ เอ็นเตอร์เทนเม้นท์)	Thailand	Rose (Note: Full name: Pachira Panyasrivinit (พชิรา ปัญญาศรีวินิจ)) (โรส)	30	B	F		69		51		33	41	36	Eliminated														
A2Z Entertainment	South Korea	Duna (Note: Full name: Kang Du-na (강두나)) (Note: Duna, Geumhee, Seoyeon, and Yeham are members of CSR.) (두나 / ดูนา)	59	F	B		42		32		32	37	30	165,440	13	18	9	17	19	503,320	16	18	14	3,121,370	14	14	14	25,093,428
A2Z Entertainment	South Korea	Seoyeon (Note: Full name: Ahn Seo-yeon (안서연)) (서연 / ซอยอน)	60	F	B		57		48		51	53	51	Eliminated														
A2Z Entertainment	South Korea	Geumhee (Note: Full name: Han Geum-hee (한금희)) (금희 / กึมฮี)	23	B	B		51		53		58	57	58	Eliminated														
A2Z Entertainment	South Korea	Yeham (Note: Full name: Gu Ye-ham (구예함)) (예함 / เยฮัม)	47	F	B		52		54		55	55	55	Eliminated														
AIM	China	Wang Ke (Note: Wang Ke was a contestant on Produce 48.) (Note: Wang Ke is a member of AIM.) (王珂)	32	B	A	19	22	18	16	12		12	22	183,901	4	3	5	5	3	907,477	4	4	4	3,950,894	11	7	6	49,290,773
Avex (エイベックス)	Japan	Akina (Note: Full name: Akina Johnson) (Note: Akina is a member of FAKY.) (アキナ)	33	B	B		29		33		29	38	10	249,767		36		36	33	151,508	Eliminated							
Avex (エイベックス)	Japan	Coco (Note: Full name: Inokuchi Coco (井口虹姫)) (虹姬)	Top 9	A	A	12	16	19	19		23	23	14	209,182		26		25	27	364,275	Eliminated							
Avex (エイベックス)	United States	Kaylen (Note: Full name: Kaylen Noelani Landry) (Note: Tegan and Kaylen are members of Tegan & Kaylen.)	10	B	B		33		39		47	46	49	Eliminated														
Avex (エイベックス)	Japan	Rei (Note: Full name: Kamikura Rei (神藏令)) (Note: Rei, Rinka, and Ruan were contestants on Girls Planet 999.) (令)	21	B	A		31		41		36	28	24	177,362		34		34	34	150,200	Eliminated							
Avex (エイベックス)	Japan	Rinka (Note: Full name: Aratake Rinka (荒武凛香)) (凛香)	55	F	B		38		35		41	10	3	317,067		24		24	20	496,162	23	23	24	1,677,889	Eliminated			
Avex (エイベックス)	United States	Tegan (Note: Full name: Tegan Inoue)	Top 9	A	F		24	16	14	14		14	21	188,459		16	19	14	18	510,248	24	24	26	1,347,785	Eliminated			
Avex (エイベックス)	Japan	Yui (Note: Full name: Ikenaga Yui (池永結泉)) (结泉)	18	B	F		37		42		44	43	48	54,143		35		32	31	169,041	Eliminated							
BDL MD Entertainment (บีดีแอล เอ็มดี เอ็นเตอร์เทนเม้นท์)	Thailand	Grace (Note: Full name: Napapat Sasipanichkul (ณปภัช ศศิพณิชกุล)) (Note: Grace, Ilene, MingMing, Pangjang, and Praew are members of MINDY.) (เกรซ)	56	F	F		44		45		46	47	46	Eliminated														
BDL MD Entertainment (บีดีแอล เอ็มดี เอ็นเตอร์เทนเม้นท์)	Thailand	Ilene (Note: Full name: Nampetch Ilene Collins (น้ำเพชร ไอลีน คอลลินส์)) (ไอลีน)	31	B	B	18	19	15	18	16		18	28	168,194	10	10	7	12	9	764,529	8	6	6	3,659,158	10	9	10	41,616,919
BDL MD Entertainment (บีดีแอล เอ็มดี เอ็นเตอร์เทนเม้นท์)	Thailand	MingMing (Note: Full name: Kanyakorn Namboonruang (กันยากร นามบุญเรือง)) (Note: MingMing, R-Jing and Krista Shim were contestants on The Voice Kids Thailand.) (Note: MingMing and Pream were members of Celeste.) (หมิงหมิง)	49	F	A		27		23		22	22	29	165,723	12	13	14	13	16	526,804	17	19	23	2,349,164	Eliminated			
BDL MD Entertainment (บีดีแอล เอ็มดี เอ็นเตอร์เทนเม้นท์)	Thailand	Pangjang (Note: Full name: Laksika Lijinda (ลักษิกา ลิจินดา)) (Note: Pangjang and Krista Shim were members of 9Qteens.) (แพงจัง)	35	B	B		36		34		38	31	40	Eliminated														
BDL MD Entertainment (บีดีแอล เอ็มดี เอ็นเตอร์เทนเม้นท์)	Thailand	Praew (Note: Full name: Laksika Leejinda(ลักษิกา ลิจินดา)) (แพรว)	13	B	B		12	14	17	17	21	21	32	164,325	17	19		22	28	360,639	13	13	13	3,136,945	13	12	13	32,411,150
Celeb Group	Vietnam	Ánh Sáng (Note: Full name: Nguyễn Lê Ngọc Ánh Sáng) (Note: Anh Sang was a member of SGO48.) (Ánh Sáng) / (อัน ซาง)	62	F	B		49		44		48	48	41	117,192		31		31	32	163,390	Eliminated							
Changchun Qiyun	China	Emma (Note: Full name: Zhū Yì Méng (朱奕萌))	Top 9	A	A	11	11	8	10	9		9	15	202,753	6	7	6	6	7	801,294	6	8	10	3,595,915	4	4	9	47,756,160
Dalingdao Music	China	Didi (Note: Full name: Ōu Yáng Dì Dì (歐陽娣娣)) (娣娣)	40	F	B	3	3	4	5	8		8	4	291,663	9	14	10	7	15	609,915	9	7	12	3,151,457	8	8	8	48,118,412
E-intent	Thailand	P.amp (Note: Full name: Tarradee Watancharoen (ธารดี วัฒนเจริญ)) (พี.แอมป์)	38	B	F		39		43		54	54	54	Eliminated														
E-intent	Thailand	Preemmy (Note: Full name: Thunayaporn Nakornsuwan (ธันยพร นครสุวรรณ)) (ปรีมมี่)	65	F	F		46		52		61	61	62	Eliminated														
Entaeus	China	Wang Yibing (王一冰)	27	B	F		55		65		68	67	68	Eliminated														
Fizzaart	India	Zoi (झो / โซย)	20	B	B		59		57		60	60	59	Eliminated														
GMM Music (จีเอ็มเอ็ม แกรมมี่)	Thailand	R-Jing (Note: Full name: Jeeranan Laotanapong (จีรนันท์ เหล่าธนพงศ์)) (อาจิง)	36	B	B		30		29		35	33	39	126,247	15	12	15	15	17	517,969	14	15	18	2,961,573	12	13	11	37,765,816
GMMTV Records (จีเอ็มเอ็มทีวี เรคคอร์ด)	Thailand	Jaoying (Note: Full name: Krongkwan Nakornthap (เจ้ายิ่ง ครองขวัญ นาครทรรพ)) (เจ้าหญิง)	42	F	F	7	13		20		25	17	20	190,912		30		27	24	417,679	27	28	19	2,953,015	Eliminated			
GMMTV Records (จีเอ็มเอ็มทีวี เรคคอร์ด)	Thailand	Pream (Note: Full name: Nutnicha Sangmanee (ณัฐณิชา แสงมณี)) (พรีม)	Top 9	A	B	17	18		21		26	27	43	Eliminated														
Gold Dust Entertainment	China	Lu Yuting (Note: Lu Yuting was a member of IS GIRL.) (陆雨婷)	66	F	F		6	11	9	5		2	2	375,598		22		18	10	758,008	28	25	16	3,114,217	18	18	18	8,819,581
Hangzhou Even Media	United States	Liliana Li (李诗恬)	Top 9	A	B		54		31		30	35	11	241,937	16	15	16	20	22	438,704	19	20	20	2,927,714	Eliminated			
High Cloud Entertainment (ไฮคลาวด์ เอนเตอร์เทนเมนต์)	Thailand	J JAZZSPER (Note: Full name: Chantaralak Buranathavornsom (จันทรลักษณ์ บูรณถาวรสม)) (Note: J JAZZSPER was a contestant on The Voice Thailand.) (Note: J JAZZSPER is a member of Bear Knuckle.) (เจแจ๊สเปอร์)	Top 9	A	B	9	10	13	15	18	24	24	42	Eliminated														
HIJOY	China	Qiao Yiyu (Note: Full name: Liu Qiao Yi Zi (刘乔一字)) (Note: Qiao Yi Yu was a contestant on Great Dance Crew.) (Note: Qiao Yi Yu and Shye were contestants on Youth π Plan.) (乔一魚)	26	B	A	15	20	10	8	7		6	7	269,126	1	2	1	1	1	1,305,620	1	1	1	6,266,050	1	1	1	80,796,328
Indonesia Musik Nusantara	Indonesia	Devi (Note: Full name: Made Devi Ranita Ningtara) (Note: Devi and Caith were members of JKT48.) (เทวิ)	63	F	F		40		38		45	44	47	Eliminated														
Insight Entertainment (อินไซท์ เอ็นเตอร์เทนเมนต์)	Thailand	Chacha (Note: Full name: Kanokrak Ngamlikitlert (กนกรักษ์ งามลิขิตเลิศ)) (Note: Chacha was a member of Berry Berry.) (ชาช่า)	16	B	B	4	5	9	11	15		13	19	193,167		28		30	30	223,788	Eliminated							
Insight Entertainment (อินไซท์ เอ็นเตอร์เทนเมนต์)	Thailand	Lissa (Note: Full name: Melissa Ann Wonson (เมริซ่า แอน วอนสัน)) (Note: Lissa was a member of Hi-U.) (ลิซซ่า)	14	B	B	13	15		26		39	42	27	171,568		25		26	26	368,244	18	17	17	2,991,783	17	17	17	14,927,163
KISS Entertainment	Japan	Ruan (Note: Full name: Ikema Ruan (池間琉杏)) (Note: Ruan is a member of KISS GIRL'S.) (琉杏 / รุอัน)	19	B	B	6	8	5	4	2		4	6	273,375	2	1	2	2	2	925,522	3	2	2	4,821,491	2	3	2	54,331,403
KS GANG (เค เอสแก๊ง)	Thailand	Yean (Note: Full name: Papitchaya Ekyotsuporn (ปพิชญา เอกสุภรณ์)) (Note: Yean was a contestant on U2U: Up to You Season 2.) (ยีนส์)	Top 9	A	A	10	9	6	6	6		7	8	260,958	5	4	3	3	6	854,670	2	3	3	4,264,077	3	5	4	49,983,314
Lize Media	China	Xuanning (Note: Full name: Tián Xuān Níng (田轩宁)) (Note: Xuan Ning was a contestant on Bravo Youngsters, Ace Actress, and Born to Dance.)	12	B	F		41		37			19	18	199,018	8	9	8	8	14	618,208	11	12	15	3,120,242	15	15	15	22,548,191
Lize Media	China	Xueyao (Note: Full name: Zéng Xuě Yáo (曾雪瑤)) (Note: Xue Yao was a contestant on Produce Camp 2020.)	41	F	F		28		22	19		16	23	177,514	11	11	12	11	11	629,190	10	9	9	3,634,169	9	10	7	48,166,930
Miss Grand International (มิสแกรนด์อินเตอร์เนชันแนล)	Thailand	Pailiu (Note: Full name: Kamonwarai Prajakrattanakul (กมลวลัย ประชารัตนกุล)) (ไผ่หลิว)	53	F	F	1	1	2	2	4		3	1	394,621	14	8	11	10	5	865,233	15	16	8	3,658,800	5	2	3	50,093,565
One 31	Thailand	Phingphing (Note: Full name: Nicha Piyawattananon (ณิชา ปิยะวัฒนานนท์)) (ผิงผิง)	50	F	F		58		40		49	50	52	Eliminated														
One 31	Thailand	Pimmie (Note: Full name: Pimlapas Jungsura (พิมพ์ลภัส จึงสุระ)) (พิมมี่)	68	F	F		26		30		40	40	45	Eliminated														
Prodigee Asia Talent	Malaysia	Aun Aun (Note: Full name: Ān Lì Yǐng (安俐穎))	69	F	F		23		25		34	39	44	Eliminated														
RK Entertainment	Thailand	TK (Note: Full name: Pavichaya Sornchai (ปวิชญา ศรชัย)) (ทีเค)	39	B	F		65		60		64	64	64	Eliminated														
RK Entertainment	Thailand	TN (Note: Full name: Preechaya Sornchai (ปรีชญา ศรชัย)) (ตี๋เอ็น)	34	B	B		67		69		67	66	63	Eliminated														
Shanghai Enjoy Media	Thailand	Natty (Note: Full name: Natthamon Jantraviphart (ณฐมน จันทราวิภาต)) (แนทตี้)	37	B	F		63		64		52	51	53	Eliminated														
Sole U Entertainment (โซลยูว์ เอนเตอร์เทนเมนต์)	Thailand	Jessica (Note: Full name: Kurisara Chanapai (กุริศรา ชนะภัย)) (เจสซิก้า)	54	F	F		45		61		65	65	66	Eliminated														
STUN.GG	Indonesia	Caith (Note: Full name: Caithlyn Gwyneth Santoso) (เคธ)	48	F	B	14	25		27		37	29	34	163,943		29		29	23	432,403	22	21	22	2,350,900	Eliminated			
T.H Entertainment (天浩盛世)	China	Wanyan Jiayi (完颜嘉怡)	52	F	F		50		55		59	59	60	Eliminated														
T.H Entertainment (天浩盛世)	China	Yuan Ke (袁珂)	61	F	F		34		28		20	34	12	217,260	19	20	18	21	13	623,151	20	11	7	3,658,946	16	16	16	16,814,653
The Voice Of Dream	China	Mamcù (Note: Full name: Sidan Mamcù (斯丹曼簇)) (曼簇) / (มัมคู)	Top 9	A	F	16	17	17	13	13		11	16	202,461		21		19	12	625,055	26	26	27	1,336,824	Eliminated			
Top Class Entertainment	China	Mao Xiuling (Note: Mao Xiuling, Mao Xiuting, Wang Shengxi, and Zhang Xiangyi are members of TOPTEENS.) (毛秀玲)	22	B	B		64		56		53	49	25	174,506		39		39	38	58,619	Eliminated							
Top Class Entertainment	China	Mao Xiuting (毛秀玲)	24	B	A		66		59		56	45	35	Eliminated														
Top Class Entertainment	China	Wang Shengxi (王晟希)	43	F	B		48		36			20	17	202,091		23		23	25	399,004	21	22	25	1,653,560	Eliminated			
Top Class Entertainment	China	Zhang Xiangyi (张香怡)	44	F	F		53		50		42	30	26	173,181		38		38	39	56,648	Eliminated							
Tri-7 Management	Singapore	Shye (Note: Full name: Trinity Shye-Anne Brown)	67	F	B		56		62		63	63	61	Eliminated														
True Tone Entertainment	Thailand	Krista Shim (Note: Krista Shim was a contestant on We Kid Thailand, Top One Season 1, and The Voice Thailand All Star.) (คริสต้า ชิม)	11	B	F	5	4	3	3	3		5	9	249,972	7	6	13	9	8	784,372	7	10	11	3,503,135	7	11	12	35,651,732
World Star Academy (เวิลด์ สตาร์ อะคาเดมี่)	Thailand	Vita (Note: Full name: Kavita Ruengrawee (กวิตา รื่นกระวี)) (วิต้า)	25	B	B		60		66		69	68	67	15,307		37		37	37	80,302	Eliminated							
Xingmeng Entertainment	China	Siyang (Note: Full name: Zhōng Sī Yáng (鐘思揚)) (思扬)	70	F	Left the show																							
XTS (星途爱乐)	China	Kittie (Note: Full name: Biān Tiān Yǔ (邊天語))	51	F	F		14	12	12	11		26	37	Eliminated														
Xunjie Entertainment (迅捷文化)	China	Xinmeng (Note: Full name: Qiáo Xīn Méng (喬鑫萌)) (鑫萌)	58	F	B		68		68		66	69	69	Eliminated														
Yolo Onwards Culture	Malaysia	Elyn (Note: Full name: Leong Yee Ling (梁愉苓))	28	B	F	2	2	1	1	1		1	5	280,390	3	5	4	4	4	882,178	5	5	5	3,811,396	6	6	5	49,811,093
Youhug Media (耀客传媒)	China	Ma Liya (马丽亚)	Top 9	A	B		61		63		43	56	65	Eliminated														

=== Notes ===
Prior to Chuang Asia: Thailand

== Missions ==
=== Mission 1: Group Battle (Episode 3) ===
Winning team
MVP

#	Team	Original artist(s)	Song	Team members
1	Love Players	GoyNattyDream ft. UrboyTJ	"Play with Me" (เล่นกันไหม)	Yean
1	Love Players	GoyNattyDream ft. UrboyTJ	"Play with Me" (เล่นกันไหม)	Acare
1	Love Players	GoyNattyDream ft. UrboyTJ	"Play with Me" (เล่นกันไหม)	Panda
1	Love Players	GoyNattyDream ft. UrboyTJ	"Play with Me" (เล่นกันไหม)	Wang Shengxi
1	Love Players	GoyNattyDream ft. UrboyTJ	"Play with Me" (เล่นกันไหม)	Seoyeon
1	Love Players	GoyNattyDream ft. UrboyTJ	"Play with Me" (เล่นกันไหม)	Caith
1	Love Players	GoyNattyDream ft. UrboyTJ	"Play with Me" (เล่นกันไหม)	Elyn
1	Chuang School	Twice	"Pieces of Love"	Kittie
1	Chuang School	Twice	"Pieces of Love"	Ray
1	Chuang School	Twice	"Pieces of Love"	Zhang Xiangyi
1	Chuang School	Twice	"Pieces of Love"	Jessica
1	Chuang School	Twice	"Pieces of Love"	Aun Aun
1	Chuang School	Twice	"Pieces of Love"	Yuan Ke
1	Chuang School	Twice	"Pieces of Love"	Lu Yuting
2	Fox Queen	Shinee	"Hard"	Emma
2	Fox Queen	Shinee	"Hard"	Yui
2	Fox Queen	Shinee	"Hard"	Ruan
2	Fox Queen	Shinee	"Hard"	Natty
2	Fox Queen	Shinee	"Hard"	Geumhee
2	Fox Queen	Shinee	"Hard"	P.amp
2	Fox Queen	Shinee	"Hard"	Jaoying
2	Fire Rose (กุหลาบไฟ)	Ariana Grande	"7 Rings"	Wang Ke
2	Fire Rose (กุหลาบไฟ)	Ariana Grande	"7 Rings"	Vita
2	Fire Rose (กุหลาบไฟ)	Ariana Grande	"7 Rings"	Liliana Li
2	Fire Rose (กุหลาบไฟ)	Ariana Grande	"7 Rings"	Lissa
2	Fire Rose (กุหลาบไฟ)	Ariana Grande	"7 Rings"	Rei
2	Fire Rose (กุหลาบไฟ)	Ariana Grande	"7 Rings"	TN
3	The Only One; For You	PtrpStudio	"Chob Thoe Ah" (ชอบเธออะ)	Zoi
3	The Only One; For You	PtrpStudio	"Chob Thoe Ah" (ชอบเธออะ)	TK
3	The Only One; For You	PtrpStudio	"Chob Thoe Ah" (ชอบเธออะ)	Tegan
3	The Only One; For You	PtrpStudio	"Chob Thoe Ah" (ชอบเธออะ)	Preemmy
3	The Only One; For You	PtrpStudio	"Chob Thoe Ah" (ชอบเธออะ)	Wang Yibing
3	The Only One; For You	PtrpStudio	"Chob Thoe Ah" (ชอบเธออะ)	Wanyan Jiayi
3	The Only One; For You	PtrpStudio	"Chob Thoe Ah" (ชอบเธออะ)	Jasmine
3	7 Bombs	4Eve	"Booty Bomb"	Coco
3	7 Bombs	4Eve	"Booty Bomb"	Yeham
3	7 Bombs	4Eve	"Booty Bomb"	Ilene
3	7 Bombs	4Eve	"Booty Bomb"	J Jazzsper
3	7 Bombs	4Eve	"Booty Bomb"	Chacha
3	7 Bombs	4Eve	"Booty Bomb"	Mao Xiuling
3	7 Bombs	4Eve	"Booty Bomb"	Mao Xiuting
4	Once Upon a Time	Violette Wautier	"Kham Wela" (ข้ามเวลา)	Mingming
4	Once Upon a Time	Violette Wautier	"Kham Wela" (ข้ามเวลา)	Pangjang
4	Once Upon a Time	Violette Wautier	"Kham Wela" (ข้ามเวลา)	Ninnint
4	Once Upon a Time	Violette Wautier	"Kham Wela" (ข้ามเวลา)	Xuanning
4	Once Upon a Time	Violette Wautier	"Kham Wela" (ข้ามเวลา)	Pailiu
4	Once Upon a Time	Violette Wautier	"Kham Wela" (ข้ามเวลา)	Pimmie
4	Once Upon a Time	Violette Wautier	"Kham Wela" (ข้ามเวลา)	Phingphing
4	Nabi Nabi (나비 나비)	Henry Young	"One More Last Time"	Duna
4	Nabi Nabi (나비 나비)	Henry Young	"One More Last Time"	Didi
4	Nabi Nabi (나비 나비)	Henry Young	"One More Last Time"	Xinmeng
4	Nabi Nabi (나비 나비)	Henry Young	"One More Last Time"	Rinka
4	Nabi Nabi (나비 나비)	Henry Young	"One More Last Time"	Devi
4	Nabi Nabi (나비 나비)	Henry Young	"One More Last Time"	Grace
4	Nabi Nabi (나비 나비)	Henry Young	"One More Last Time"	Rose
5	Yours	PP Krit	"I'll Do It How You Like It"	Pream
5	Yours	PP Krit	"I'll Do It How You Like It"	R-Jing
5	Yours	PP Krit	"I'll Do It How You Like It"	Krista Shim
5	Yours	PP Krit	"I'll Do It How You Like It"	Xueyao
5	Yours	PP Krit	"I'll Do It How You Like It"	Ma Liya
5	Yours	PP Krit	"I'll Do It How You Like It"	Mamcù
5	Yours	PP Krit	"I'll Do It How You Like It"	Chaba
5	Kick Back	WayV	"Kick Back" (秘境)	Qiao Yiyu
5	Kick Back	WayV	"Kick Back" (秘境)	Kanompang
5	Kick Back	WayV	"Kick Back" (秘境)	Praew
5	Kick Back	WayV	"Kick Back" (秘境)	Akina
5	Kick Back	WayV	"Kick Back" (秘境)	Shye
5	Kick Back	WayV	"Kick Back" (秘境)	Ánh Sáng
5	Kick Back	WayV	"Kick Back" (秘境)	Kaylen

=== Mission 2: Position Battle (Episode 6) ===
Best performance group
Winning team
MVP

#	Original artist(s)	Song	Team members
Special	Ally ft. Je T'Aime	"No Matter What I Do"	Santa
Special	Ally ft. Je T'Aime	"No Matter What I Do"	Yean
Special	Ally ft. Je T'Aime	"No Matter What I Do"	Wang Ke
Special	Ally ft. Je T'Aime	"No Matter What I Do"	Ilene
Special	Ally ft. Je T'Aime	"No Matter What I Do"	Xuanning
Special	Ally ft. Je T'Aime	"No Matter What I Do"	Qiao Yiyu
1	TroyBoi	"Do You?"	Emma
1	TroyBoi	"Do You?"	Qiao Yiyu
1	TroyBoi	"Do You?"	Panda
1	TroyBoi	"Do You?"	Wang Ke
1	TroyBoi	"Do You?"	Ánh Sáng
1	Tsunari & Milli	"Whip It" (ฟาด)	Rei
1	Tsunari & Milli	"Whip It" (ฟาด)	Coco
1	Tsunari & Milli	"Whip It" (ฟาด)	Praew
1	Tsunari & Milli	"Whip It" (ฟาด)	Vita
1	Tsunari & Milli	"Whip It" (ฟาด)	Tegan
2	themoonwillalwaysbewithme	"Zulupaka Tapahey" (ซูลูปาก้า ตาปาเฮ้)	R-Jing
2	themoonwillalwaysbewithme	"Zulupaka Tapahey" (ซูลูปาก้า ตาปาเฮ้)	Jasmine
2	themoonwillalwaysbewithme	"Zulupaka Tapahey" (ซูลูปาก้า ตาปาเฮ้)	Acare
2	themoonwillalwaysbewithme	"Zulupaka Tapahey" (ซูลูปาก้า ตาปาเฮ้)	Mao Xiuling
2	themoonwillalwaysbewithme	"Zulupaka Tapahey" (ซูลูปาก้า ตาปาเฮ้)	Ilene
2	Ivoris	"I Wish My Mind; Would Shut Up"	Xuanning
2	Ivoris	"I Wish My Mind; Would Shut Up"	Lu Yuting
2	Ivoris	"I Wish My Mind; Would Shut Up"	Ninnint
2	Ivoris	"I Wish My Mind; Would Shut Up"	Xueyao
2	Ivoris	"I Wish My Mind; Would Shut Up"	Zhang Xiangyi
3	Day6	"You Were Beautiful" (예뻤어)	Yean
3	Day6	"You Were Beautiful" (예뻤어)	Jaoying
3	Day6	"You Were Beautiful" (예뻤어)	Liliana Li
3	Day6	"You Were Beautiful" (예뻤어)	Duna
3	Day6	"You Were Beautiful" (예뻤어)	Mingming
3	Ellie Goulding	"Love Me like You Do"	Krista Shim
3	Ellie Goulding	"Love Me like You Do"	Rinka
3	Ellie Goulding	"Love Me like You Do"	Lissa
3	Ellie Goulding	"Love Me like You Do"	Mamcù
4	Zara Larsson	"Ain't My Fault"	Akina
4	Zara Larsson	"Ain't My Fault"	Pailiu
4	Zara Larsson	"Ain't My Fault"	Yui
4	Zara Larsson	"Ain't My Fault"	Didi
4	Zara Larsson	"Ain't My Fault"	Chacha
4	Ally	"ZiGZaG"	Ruan
4	Ally	"ZiGZaG"	Elyn
4	Ally	"ZiGZaG"	Yuan Ke
4	Ally	"ZiGZaG"	Wang Shengxi
4	Ally	"ZiGZaG"	Caith

=== Mission 3: Cooperation Stage (Episode 8) ===
Stage MVP
MVP

#	Original artist(s)	Song	Guest performer	Team members
Special	(G)I-dle	"Queencard"	Minnie	
1	Twice	"What Is Love?"	Mike Angelo	Qiao Yiyu
1	Twice	"What Is Love?"	Mike Angelo	Emma
1	Twice	"What Is Love?"	Mike Angelo	Didi
1	Twice	"What Is Love?"	Mike Angelo	Rinka
1	Twice	"What Is Love?"	Mike Angelo	Lissa
1	Twice	"What Is Love?"	Mike Angelo	Jasmine
2	Jeff Satur	"Dum Dum" (ดึมดึม)	Jeff Satur	Wang Ke
2	Jeff Satur	"Dum Dum" (ดึมดึม)	Jeff Satur	Ilene
2	Jeff Satur	"Dum Dum" (ดึมดึม)	Jeff Satur	Wang Shengxi
2	Jeff Satur	"Dum Dum" (ดึมดึม)	Jeff Satur	Mingming
2	Jeff Satur	"Dum Dum" (ดึมดึม)	Jeff Satur	Yuan Ke
2	Jeff Satur	"Dum Dum" (ดึมดึม)	Jeff Satur	Xuanning
3	Chuang 2021	"Push No.5 for Cute in Input Method" (输入法打可爱按第五)	Wang Ziqi	Pailiu
3	Chuang 2021	"Push No.5 for Cute in Input Method" (输入法打可爱按第五)	Wang Ziqi	Krista Shim
3	Chuang 2021	"Push No.5 for Cute in Input Method" (输入法打可爱按第五)	Wang Ziqi	Tegan
3	Chuang 2021	"Push No.5 for Cute in Input Method" (输入法打可爱按第五)	Wang Ziqi	R-Jing
3	Chuang 2021	"Push No.5 for Cute in Input Method" (输入法打可爱按第五)	Wang Ziqi	Ninnint
3	Chuang 2021	"Push No.5 for Cute in Input Method" (输入法打可爱按第五)	Wang Ziqi	Mamcù
4	Win Metawin	"Night Ride" (ดึกมากแล้ว)	Win Metawin	Elyn
4	Win Metawin	"Night Ride" (ดึกมากแล้ว)	Win Metawin	Yean
4	Win Metawin	"Night Ride" (ดึกมากแล้ว)	Win Metawin	Jaoying
4	Win Metawin	"Night Ride" (ดึกมากแล้ว)	Win Metawin	Acare
4	Win Metawin	"Night Ride" (ดึกมากแล้ว)	Win Metawin	Liliana Li
4	Win Metawin	"Night Ride" (ดึกมากแล้ว)	Win Metawin	Duna
5	Ten	"Nightwalker"	Ten	Ruan
5	Ten	"Nightwalker"	Ten	Xueyao
5	Ten	"Nightwalker"	Ten	Praew
5	Ten	"Nightwalker"	Ten	Caith
5	Ten	"Nightwalker"	Ten	Lu Yuting

=== Mission 4: Final Stage (Episode 10) ===
==== Battle Stage ====
#	Original artist(s)	Song	Team members
1	Girls' Generation	"Into the New World"	Ruan
1	Girls' Generation	"Into the New World"	Yean
1	Girls' Generation	"Into the New World"	Wang Ke
1	Girls' Generation	"Into the New World"	Elyn
1	Girls' Generation	"Into the New World"	Yuan Ke
1	Girls' Generation	"Into the New World"	Krista Shim
1	Girls' Generation	"Into the New World"	Didi
1	Girls' Generation	"Into the New World"	Lissa
1	Girls' Generation	"Into the New World"	R-Jing
2	4Eve	"Vroom Vroom"	Qiao Yiyu
2	4Eve	"Vroom Vroom"	Ilene
2	4Eve	"Vroom Vroom"	Pailiu
2	4Eve	"Vroom Vroom"	Xueyao
2	4Eve	"Vroom Vroom"	Emma
2	4Eve	"Vroom Vroom"	Praew
2	4Eve	"Vroom Vroom"	Duna
2	4Eve	"Vroom Vroom"	Xuanning
2	4Eve	"Vroom Vroom"	Lu Yuting

==== Unit Stage ====
#	Original artist(s)	Song	Team members
1	Loco & Punch	"Say Yes"	Ruan
1	Loco & Punch	"Say Yes"	Lu Yuting
1	Loco & Punch	"Say Yes"	Yuan Ke
1	Loco & Punch	"Say Yes"	Krista Shim
1	Loco & Punch	"Say Yes"	Didi
1	Loco & Punch	"Say Yes"	Wang Ke
2	Chuang 2021	"Be Mine"	Elyn
2	Chuang 2021	"Be Mine"	Xuanning
2	Chuang 2021	"Be Mine"	Pailiu
2	Chuang 2021	"Be Mine"	Yean
2	Chuang 2021	"Be Mine"	R-Jing
2	Chuang 2021	"Be Mine"	Duna
3	Saweetie ft. Doja Cat	"Best Friend"	Ilene
3	Saweetie ft. Doja Cat	"Best Friend"	Emma
3	Saweetie ft. Doja Cat	"Best Friend"	Praew
3	Saweetie ft. Doja Cat	"Best Friend"	Qiao Yiyu
3	Saweetie ft. Doja Cat	"Best Friend"	Xueyao
3	Saweetie ft. Doja Cat	"Best Friend"	Lissa
