= Next1de =

Thailand-based boy group

- Origin: Bangkok, Thailand
- Years active: 2025–present
- Label: Tencent Music
- Members: Dorn; Thi-o; Hu Yetao; Shen; Omar; Xiong; Yao Zihao

Next1de (stylized as NexT1DE) is a boy group based in Thailand under Tencent Music. They were formed through the 2025 reality show Chuang Asia: Season 2 on WeTV. The group consists of seven members: Dorn, Thi-o, Hu Yetao, Shen, Omar, Xiong, and Yao Zihao. They made their debut on May 6, 2025, with their eponymous digital single.

== History ==
=== Pre-debut ===
Prior to Chuang Asia: Season 2, member Hu Yetao competed on Chuang 2021 (2021), the final entry of the Chuang series to run in China. Member Thi-o also previously competed on the Thai idol reality competition show The Two (2022), where he managed to make his debut as part of the duo Thi-o & Tutor in 2023, before making his solo debut in 2024.

=== 2025–present: Chuang Asia: Season 2 and debut ===
After the conclusion of the first season of Chuang Asia, a second season was announced to be in the work, featuring male contestants. Chuang Asia: Season 2 ran from February to April 2025, ending with the formation of the boy group Next1de, which performed their eponymous single. The single was later officially released on May 6, marking the group's debut. Next1de released their first EP, One Heart, New Adventure!, on August 29. Its lead single, "Take it Easy", was previously released on August 15.

== Members ==
- Dorn (ดรณ์)
- Thi-o (ไทโอ)
- Hu Yetao (胡烨韬)
- Shen (申义晟)
- Omar (唐奥玛)
- Xiong (林锦雄)
- Yao Zihao (姚梓豪)

== Discography ==
=== Extended plays ===
List of extended plays, showing selected details
Title	Details
One Heart, New Adventure!	Released: August 29, 2025; Label: Tencent Music; Formats: CD, digital download, streaming; Track listing: 1. "Next1de"; 2. "奔跑在地球的小孩"; 3. "Chemistry" (薄荷夏天); 4. "Take it Easy" (大不了); 5. "Always With You"; 6. "Skyline" (Next1de version); 7. "Skyline" (Chinese version)
Reckless	Released: March 31, 2026; Label: Tencent Music; Formats: Digital download, streaming; Track listing: 1. "Reckless"; 2. "With You to the End" (陪你走到站台终点); 3. "Still Here" (English version); 4. "Still Here" (Chinese version)

=== Singles ===
List of singles, showing year released, and name of the album
Title	Year	Album
"Next1de"	2025	One Heart, New Adventure!
"Take it Easy" (大不了)	2025	One Heart, New Adventure!
"Panda Flow"	2026	Non-album single
"Reckless"	2026	Reckless
"Unbound" (无界之境)	2026	Non-album single
"With You to the End"	2026	Reckless

==== Promotional singles ====
List of promotional singles, showing year released, and additional notes
Title	Year	Note
"Just Say Hello"	2025	Cover of Melo D
"Evening Breeze"	2025	Cover of 陆杰awr
"新年要快乐" (with SING)	2026	

== Filmography ==
=== Reality shows ===
Year	Title	Notes	Ref.
2025	Chuang Asia: Season 2	Reality show that determined the members of Next1de	
