= List of Produce 101 China contestants =

Produce 101 China (Chinese: 《创造101》; pinyin: Chuàngzào Yīlíngyī) is a 2018 Chinese reality competition show and spin-off of the South Korean television series Produce 101. 101 trainees, aged 15–28 years old, compete to debut in an 11-member girl group, with members selected by online voting from viewers.

== Contestants ==
Color key

Left the show
Eliminated in the 2nd episode
Top 11 of the week
Contestants saved from elimination
Eliminated in 1st elimination
Eliminated in 2nd elimination
Eliminated in 3rd elimination
Eliminated in 4th elimination
Final debuting members

Company	Name	Age	Grade					Ranking								
Company	Name	Age	1	2	3	4	5	E02	E03	E04	E05	E06	E07	E08	E09	E10
Banana Entertainment (香蕉娱乐)	Qiang Dongyue (Note: Former contestant on Super Girl 2016 (Chinese: 《超级女声》; pinyin: Chāojí Nǚshēng)) (Note: Former contestant on The Rap of China (season 1) (Chinese: 《中国有嘻哈》; pinyin: Zhōngguó Yǒu Xīhā) (June–September 2017)) (Note: Member of Chinese pre-debut girl group Trainee18) (强东玥)	24	A → B	B	A	A	B	2	5	5	7	10	10	17	20	21
Banana Entertainment (香蕉娱乐)	Fu Jing (傅菁)	23	B	A	A	A	B	8	8	10	9	9	9	12	12	10
Banana Entertainment (香蕉娱乐)	Wang Yiran (王亦然)		B	B	Eliminated			81	83	83	Eliminated					
Banana Entertainment (香蕉娱乐)	Liu Niyi (刘尼夷)		C	C	Eliminated			77	85	88	Eliminated					
Banana Entertainment (香蕉娱乐)	Wang Manjun (王曼君)		C	D	Eliminated			96	96	96	Eliminated					
Yuehua Entertainment (乐华娱乐)	Meng Meiqi (Note: Member of Korean girl group WJSN/Cosmic Girls) (孟美岐)	20	A	A	A	A	A	16	6	4	1	1	1	1	1	1
Yuehua Entertainment (乐华娱乐)	Wu Xuanyi (吴宣仪)	24	A → B	A	A	A	A	5	1	1	2	3	3	3	3	2
Yuehua Entertainment (乐华娱乐)	Mena Shao XiMengNa (邵西蒙娜)		B	B	C	Eliminated		52	69	40	51	51	52	Eliminated		
Yuehua Entertainment (乐华娱乐)	Jiang Jinger (江璟儿)		C	B	D	Eliminated		40	40	52	41	46	47	Eliminated		
Yuehua Entertainment (乐华娱乐)	Zhang Xi (张溪)		B	B	D	Eliminated		42	43	42	48	50	51	Eliminated		
Yuehua Entertainment (乐华娱乐)	Pan Junya (潘珺雅)		C	C	Eliminated			63	72	76	Eliminated					
Yuehua Entertainment (乐华娱乐)	Yang Ruihan (杨蕊菡)		C	B	Eliminated			83	79	68	Eliminated					
Mavericks Entertainment (麦锐娱乐)	Zhang Zining (Note: Member of Chinese girl group Mera) (张紫宁)	22	A	A	B	A	A	47	23	18	5	5	7	10	8	7
Mavericks Entertainment (麦锐娱乐)	Blair Wang Yue (王玥)		C	D	Eliminated			51	60	74	Eliminated					
Mavericks Entertainment (麦锐娱乐)	Zhang Ruimeng (张芮萌)		D	F	Eliminated			29	61	79	Eliminated					
OACA (觉醒东方)	Li Zixuan (Note: Former contestant on Girls Fighting (Chinese: 《加油！美少女》; pinyin: Jiāyóu! Měi Shàonǚ; lit. 'Come On! Beautiful Girl') (June–August 2016)) (李子璇)		B	A	A	B	B	12	10	9	10	13	13	23	17	12
OACA (觉醒东方)	Lin Junyi (林君怡)		A	B	Eliminated			46	56	71	Eliminated					
OACA (觉醒东方)	Ni Qiuyun (倪秋云)		B	C	Eliminated			65	58	67	Eliminated					
Super Jet Entertainment (捷特联合)	Zhu Tiantian (朱天天)		B	F	C	Eliminated		90	88	35	45	40	38	Eliminated		
Super Jet Entertainment (捷特联合)	Liu Dexi (刘德熙)		B	C	D	Eliminated		37	74	53	57	53	46	Eliminated		
Emperor Entertainment Group (英皇娱乐)	Angela Hui / Xu Jingyun (许靖韵)		A	C	D	C	B	32	36	54	23	28	31	20	22	19
Huayi Brothers (华谊兄弟)	Qi Yandi (戚砚笛)		B	C	C	B	B	55	45	27	19	17	17	18	15	18
HIM International Music (Taiwan)	Wu Yun-ting (Note: Member of Taiwanese girl group Popu Lady) (吴昀廷)		D	D	Eliminated			94	95	95	Eliminated					
HIM International Music (Taiwan)	Liu Yu-shan (刘宇珊)		F	D	Eliminated			84	86	85	Eliminated					
C.Y Media	Lin Chia-an (林珈安)		C	B	Eliminated			62	62	72	Eliminated					
Wenlan Culture (闻澜文化)	Yang Chaoyue (杨超越)	19	C	F	A	A	A	4	3	3	4	2	2	9	7	3
Wenlan Culture (闻澜文化)	Yang Meiqi (杨美琪)		F	D	Eliminated			54	55	69	Eliminated					
Wenlan Culture (闻澜文化)	Yang Meiling (杨美玲)		D	F	Eliminated			75	84	87	Eliminated					
Wenlan Culture (闻澜文化)	Zhao Ling (赵羚)		F	Eliminated				98	Eliminated							
T-Trainee Culture	Wu Yingxiang (吴映香)		A	B	B	C	B	14	16	17	29	25	26	26	19	22
MOMO Limited	Zhang Xinlei (张鑫磊)		F	F	Eliminated			57	65	56	Eliminated					
Huakai Banxia Culture	Zhang Chuhan (Note: Member of Chinese girl group Hello Girls) (张楚寒)		F	C	D	Eliminated		31	57	48	52	56	55	Eliminated		
Huakai Banxia Culture	Jiang Yanxi (姜彦汐)		D	D	Eliminated			80	87	58	Eliminated					
Huakai Banxia Culture	Zhang Xinjie (张新洁)		D	F	Eliminated			79	82	65	Eliminated					
Huakai Banxia Culture	Wu Xiaoxuan (吴小萱)		F	D	Eliminated			88	51	61	Eliminated					
Universal Music Taiwan (Record label)	Kimberley Chen Fang-yu (Note: The label that manages Kimberley Chen is Sharp Music, however she joined the show under her distribution label, which is Universal Music Taiwan.) (陈芳语)		A	B	A	B	Eliminated	7	13	8	17	21	19	24	26	Eliminated
Rhonin Studio	Zhang Yuwen (张瑜纹)		B	D	Eliminated			99	98	97	Eliminated					
Rhonin Studio	Liu Jiaying (刘佳莹)		D	C	Eliminated			87	92	94	Eliminated					
Mango Entertainment	Lü Xiaoyu (吕小雨)		A	A	B	B	B	35	20	19	20	22	20	16	18	20
Lajin Media	Wang Juemeng (王珏萌)		C	D	Eliminated			100	99	99	Eliminated					
Lajin Media	Zhang Xinyue (张馨月)		B	D	Eliminated			36	47	64	Eliminated					
Qigu Culture	Lai Meiyun (Note: Member of Chinese girl group S.I.N.G. (Chinese: SING女团)) (赖美云)		B	B	B	B	A	18	17	16	12	14	14	7	9	6
Qigu Culture	Jiang Shen (蒋申)		C	C	Saved	C	Eliminated	56	46	59	38	26	25	22	23	Eliminated
Qigu Culture	Xu Shiyin (许诗茵)		D	F	Eliminated			72	76	75	Eliminated					
K-L Entertainment	Sunnee Yang Yunqing (Note: Member of Taiwanese girl group A'N'D) (杨芸晴) / (เกวลิน บุญศรัทธา)	21	A	B	A	A	A	6	7	7	8	7	8	11	11	8
K-L Entertainment	Zhao Yaoke (Note: Member of Chinese girl group KOGIRLS) (赵尧珂)		F	D	B	B	Eliminated	17	12	12	18	18	18	19	24	Eliminated
K-L Entertainment	Wang Qing (王晴)		B	C	B	Eliminated		9	9	13	27	33	39	Eliminated		
K-L Entertainment	Yu Meihong (于美红)		C	F	C	Eliminated		25	28	30	30	39	41	Eliminated		
K-L Entertainment	Lucia Chen Yingyan (陈盈燕)		C	D	Eliminated			34	44	57	Eliminated					
K-L Entertainment	Zheng Chengcheng (郑丞丞)		C	F	Left			93	Left the show							
AKB48 CHINA	Liu Nian (刘念)		C	F	Saved	Eliminated		61	48	63	47	41	42	Eliminated		
AKB48 CHINA	Mao Weijia (毛唯嘉)		D	D	Eliminated			64	59	70	Eliminated					
YY Media	Fan Wei (范薇)		C	C	C	C	Eliminated	22	24	26	24	30	33	28	28	Eliminated
YY Media	Liu Sixian (刘思纤)		D	D	C	Eliminated		76	41	34	50	52	54	Eliminated		
YY Media	Wu Qian (吴茜)		D	C	D	Eliminated		74	78	51	54	57	57	Eliminated		
YY Media	Xiang Yuxing (向俞星)		C	F	D	Eliminated		30	64	46	56	58	56	Eliminated		
YY Media	Chen Yifan (陈怡凡)		D	D	Eliminated			66	70	81	Eliminated					
Sanmei Entertainment	Jiao Manting (焦曼婷)		F	D	B	B	Eliminated	19	19	24	28	20	22	33	35	Eliminated
Zhiyi Media	Ren Zhen (Note: Member of Chinese pre-debut project group YZ.Girls) (任真)		D	D	Eliminated			73	63	66	Eliminated					
Zhiyi Media	Hu Yue'er (Note: Former member of Korean girl group O21 (2016–2017)) (胡悦儿)		D	D	Eliminated			67	68	78	Eliminated					
Dream Entertainment	Ju Lin (菊麟)		D	F	D	Eliminated		71	81	50	42	45	45	Eliminated		
Dream Entertainment	Shao Xia (邵夏)		F	C	Eliminated			92	80	73	Eliminated					
Checkmate Entertainment	Yang Han (杨晗)		C	B	Eliminated			89	93	93	Eliminated					
Checkmate Entertainment	Li Tianyun (Note: Member of Chinese girl group ACEMAX-RED) (Note: Former contestant on Korean idol survival show The Unit: Idol Rebooting Project (October 2017 – February 2018)) (李天韻)		D	D	Eliminated			43	67	80	Eliminated					
Z-Cherry Culture	Yang Bing (杨冰)		D	F	D	Eliminated		26	54	55	49	48	49	Eliminated		
Z-Cherry Culture	Chen Yuyan (陈语嫣)		C	B	Eliminated			41	71	82	Eliminated					
Z-Cherry Culture	Xia Shijie (夏诗洁)		F	C	Eliminated			48	75	84	Eliminated					
Poodoo Entertainment	Wang Ting (Note: Member of Chinese pre-debut project group MOI) (王婷)		F	B	D	C	Eliminated	50	52	45	31	43	34	32	31	Eliminated
Poodoo Entertainment	Gou Xueying (勾雪莹)		D	D	D	Eliminated		69	66	47	40	47	48	Eliminated		
Long WuTian Culture	Duan Aojuan (段奥娟)	17	B	C	A	A	A	3	4	6	6	8	5	4	5	4
Zimei Tao Culture	Gao Qiuzi (Note: Member of Chinese girl group Lady Bees (Chinese: 蜜蜂少女队; pinyin: Mìfēng Shàonǚ Duì)) (高秋梓)		D	D	B	A	A	21	18	20	13	11	11	8	10	16
Zimei Tao Culture	Xu Mengjie (徐梦洁)	23	C	C	B	B	B	13	15	15	16	16	16	15	16	11
Zimei Tao Culture	Han Dan (韩丹)		D	D	Eliminated			91	89	89	Eliminated					
ETM Academy	Liu Renyu (Note: Member of Chinese pre-debut girl group Oxygen Girls (the group was later renamed, and debuted as Chic Chili [Chinese: 西可西丽; pinyin: Xīkě Xīlì])) (刘人语)		A	A	B	B	B	24	22	22	14	15	15	14	13	13
ETM Academy	Luo Yijia (罗奕佳)		B	B	B	C	Eliminated	44	27	23	36	31	32	36	36	Eliminated
ETM Academy	Su Ruiqi (苏芮琪)		C	B	C	C	Eliminated	78	29	28	39	29	29	21	25	Eliminated
ETM Academy	Ma Xingyu (马兴钰)		D	F	B	Eliminated		28	25	25	58	55	53	Eliminated		
ETM Academy	Zhang Jingxuan (张静萱)		D	F	Eliminated			95	53	62	Eliminated					
ETM Academy	Wang Yalin (王雅凛)		C	D	Eliminated			85	73	77	Eliminated					
ETM Academy	Yan Kexin (颜可欣)		C	D	Eliminated			97	97	98	Eliminated					
Rongyi Culture	Zhou Xue (Note: Member of Chinese girl group Idol School (Chinese: 偶像学园; pinyin: Ǒuxiàng Xuéyuán; lit. 'Idol Academy') (not to be confused with the unrelated 2017 Korean girl group survival show Idol School)) (周雪)		F	C	Eliminated			53	49	60	Eliminated					
Ivy Culture	Lu Xiaocao (鹿小草)		D	F	C	C	Eliminated	27	32	36	21	23	28	30	32	Eliminated
JC Universe Entertainment	Yamy Guo Ying (郭颖)	26	A	A	A	A	A	1	2	2	3	4	4	6	4	5
JC Universe Entertainment	Wei Jin (魏瑾)		A → B	B	C	C	Eliminated	39	30	32	32	32	27	31	30	Eliminated
JC Universe Entertainment	Luo Yitian (罗怡恬)		C	C	C	C	Eliminated	60	38	37	33	27	30	35	34	Eliminated
JC Universe Entertainment	Du Jinyu (杜金雨)		C	C	D	Eliminated		59	37	44	46	38	37	Eliminated		
JC Universe Entertainment	Chou Chou (丑丑)		A → B	B	D	Eliminated		58	42	43	37	44	44	Eliminated		
JC Universe Entertainment	Luo Zhiyi (罗智仪)		B	B	D	Eliminated		70	39	41	44	49	50	Eliminated		
Huanri Shiji Culture	Qiu Luqing (邱路晴)		D	F	Eliminated			101	100	100	Eliminated					
Huanri Shiji Culture	Yin Rouyi (尹柔懿)		D	F	Eliminated			86	90	91	Eliminated					
Huanri Shiji Culture	Zhu Jiaxi (朱佳希) / (JC)		D	D	Eliminated			49	77	86	Eliminated					
Huaying Yixing	Li Ziting (Note: Former contestant on The Voice Kids Thailand (2013)) (李紫婷) / (พร้อมวิไล หลี่ศิริโรจน์)	18	A → B	A	A	A	A	11	11	11	11	6	6	5	6	9
DongLun Media	Wang Mohan (王莫涵)		D	C	D	B	Eliminated	33	35	49	25	19	21	29	29	Eliminated
JOY Entertainment	Chen Yihan (陈意涵)		C	F	C	C	B	20	26	31	35	37	35	25	21	14
JXJY Culture	Yin Rui (尹蕊)		F	C	C	Eliminated		45	50	39	53	54	58	Eliminated		
Individual Trainee	Wang Ju (Note: One of the "amateur" contestants, introduced in episode 2, who had never received any previous professional idol training.) (王菊)		C	C	Saved	B	A		94	90	55	36	23	2	2	15
Individual Trainee	Ge Jiahui (Note: Member of SNH48 Team NII, but joined the show as an individual trainee) (葛佳慧)		D	C	B	Eliminated		10	14	14	34	42	43	Eliminated		
Individual Trainee	Luo Tianshu (罗天舒)		C	C	Eliminated			82	91	92	Eliminated					
ReDu Music	Liu Danmeng (刘丹萌)		A → B	B	C	C	Eliminated	38	34	38	43	34	36	34	33	Eliminated
SDT Entertainment	Gao Yingxi (高颖浠)		C	A	C	B	B		31	29	15	12	12	13	14	17
SDT Entertainment	Wu Qianying (吴芊盈)		B	A	C	C	Eliminated		33	33	22	24	24	27	27	Eliminated
Esee Model Management	Re Yina (热依娜)		A	F	B	Eliminated			21	21	26	35	40	Eliminated		
RealShow Entertainment	Cindy Fan Lina (Note: Member of Chinese girl group 3unshine (Sunshine)) (范麗娜)		F	Eliminated				15	Eliminated							
RealShow Entertainment	Dora Wang Xiaodie (王小蝶)		F	Eliminated				68	Eliminated							
RealShow Entertainment	Abby Ji Xinyue (吉星月)		F	Left				23	Left the show							
