= Produce 101 =

Reality television talent competition franchise

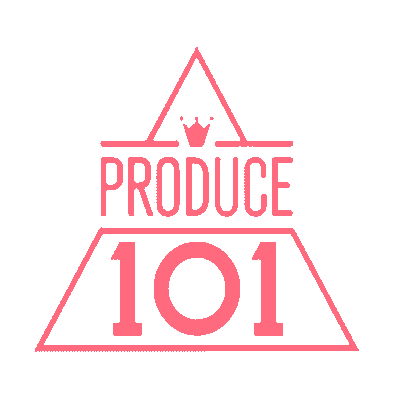
- Logo of Produce 101
- Hangul: 프로듀스 101
- RR: Peurodyuseu 101
- MR: P'ŭrodyusŭ 101
- Genre: Reality television-talent show
- Country of origin: South Korea
- Original language: Korean
- No. of seasons: 4 (South Korea); 4 (China); 4 (Japan); 2 (Thailand)

Original release
- Network: Mnet
- Release: 22 January 2016 – present

Produce 101 (Korean: 프로듀스 101) is a reality television talent competition franchise created by South Korean entertainment conglomerate CJ E&M, based around the formation of a K-pop girl group or boy group. The format is noted for having no panel of judges, employing audience participation to make decisions, as well as for starting with a very large number of competitors, 101, narrowing that number down to the final 11. The franchise began in 2016 and has since expanded to China, Japan and Thailand.

The franchise has attracted a wide following in the world. More than 10 million people cast votes during the finale of Season 2 in 2017, equivalent to a fifth of South Korea's population. In 2018, the eight episodes of Produce 101 China attracted more than 4.3 billion views on Tencent Video.

Following the Mnet vote manipulation investigation, on 14 November 2019, producer Ahn Joon-young partially admitted to rigging the votes of all seasons of Produce 101 during police questioning. He was arrested before over allegations of bribery and fraud in the franchise.

== Versions ==
=== South Korea ===
- Produce 101, featuring female trainees, premiered on 22 January 2016.
- Produce 101 Season 2, featuring male trainees, premiered on 7 April 2017.
- Produce 48, featuring female trainees and members of J-pop idol group AKB48 including its sister groups, premiered on 15 June 2018.
- Produce X 101, featuring male trainees, premiered on 3 May 2019.

=== China ===
- Produce 101 China, featuring female trainees, premiered on 21 April 2018.
- Produce Camp 2019 (officially known as Chuang 2019), featuring male trainees, premiered on 6 April 2019.
- Produce Camp 2020 (officially known as Chuang 2020), featuring female trainees, premiered on 2 May 2020.
- Produce Camp 2021 (officially known as Chuang 2021), featuring male trainees, premiered on 17 February 2021.

=== Thailand ===
- Chuang Asia: Thailand (also known as Produce Camp Asia: Thailand), featuring female trainees, premiered on 3 February 2024.
- Chuang Asia: Season 2 (also known as Chuang Asia 2025), featuring male trainees, premiered on February 2, 2025

=== Japan ===
- Produce 101 Japan, featuring male trainees, premiered on 26 September 2019.
- Produce 101 Japan Season 2, featuring male trainees, premiered on 8 April 2021.
- Produce 101 Japan The Girls, featuring female trainees, premiered on 5 October 2023.
- Produce 101 Japan Shinsekai, featuring male trainees, premiered on 26 March 2026.

== Summary of shows by country ==
As of 6 June 2026, there have been 14 groups debuted with 146 members involved in over 3 franchises of Produce 101.

- Currently airing
- An upcoming season
- Status Unknown
- No longer airing

Country	Local title	Network	Seasons and group created	Mentors			Hosts/ Lead mentors
Country	Local title	Network	Seasons and group created	Vocal	Dance	Rap	Hosts/ Lead mentors
South Korea	Produce 101	Mnet	Season 1, 2016: I.O.I; Season 2, 2017: Wanna One; Season 3, 2018: IZ*ONE (Note: This season was known as Produce 48.); Season 4, 2019: X1 (Note: This season was known as Produce X 101.)	JeA (1); Kim Sung-eun (1); Lee Seok-hoon (2, 4); Shin Yoo-mi (2, 4); Lee Hong-gi (3); Soyou (3)	Kahi (1, 2); Bae Yoon-jeong (1, 3, 4); Kwon Jae-seung (2, 4); Choi Young-jun (3, 4); May J Lee (3)	Cheetah (1, 2, 3, 4); Hwang Dong-hyun (2)	Jang Keun-suk (1); BoA (2); Lee Seung-gi (3); Lee Dong-wook (4)
China (Note: No longer airing due to a ban on idol competition shows.) (Note: In 2023 it was announced that future seasons of the show would be located outside of China.)	Produce 101 (1); Produce Camp / Chuang (2-6)	Tencent (1-6) One31 (5-6)	Season 1, 2018: Rocket Girls 101; Season 2, 2019: R1SE (Note: This season was officially known as Chuang 2019.); Season 3, 2020: BonBon Girls 303 (Note: This season was officially known as Chuang 2020.); Season 4, 2021: INTO1 (Note: This season was officially known as Chuang 2021.)	Ella Chen (1); Jason Zhang (1); Alec Su (2); Lu Han (3); Mao Buyi (3); Zhou Shen (4)	Show Lo (1); Wang Yibo (1); Aaron Kwok (2); Victoria Song (3); Amber Liu (4)	Tiger Hu (1, 2); Stanley Huang (2); Z.Tao (3); Zhou Zhennan (4)	Z.Tao (1, 3); Dilraba Dilmurat (2); Deng Chao (4)
Thailand	Produce 101 (1); Produce Camp / Chuang (2-6)	Tencent (1-6) One31 (5-6)	Season 5, 2024: Gen1es (Note: This season is officially known as Chuang Asia: Thailand.); Season 6, 2025: NexT1DE (Note: This season is officially known as Chuang Asia: Season 2.)	Jeff Satur (5, 6); Nene (5); Mike Angelo (5); Tia Ray (6); Yaya Urassaya (6)	Ten (5); The8 (6)	Jackson Wang (5); BamBam (6)	Jackson Wang (5); BamBam (6); The8 (6)
Japan	Produce 101 Japan	TBS (1-3); GyaO! (1-2); Lemino (3-4); Nippon TV (4); Mnet (4)	Season 1, 2019: JO1; Season 2, 2021: INI; Season 3, 2023: ME:I (Note: This season is known as Produce 101 Japan The Girls.); Season 4, 2026: KO1KEYZ (Note: This season is known as Produce 101 Japan Shinsekai.)	Hidenori Sugai (1, 2); Sayaka Yasukura (1); Thelma Aoyama (2, 3); Lee Hong-gi (3); Kevin Woo (4); Kaname Kawabata (4)	A-non (1); Warner (1); KENZO (2); Rino Nakasone (2, 3, 4); Yumeki (3); Kaita (4)	Cypress Ueno (1); Bose (1); Ken the 390 (2, 3); Yuto Adachi (4)	Ninety-nine (1, 2); Kaela Kimura (3); Dean Fujioka (4); Choi Soo-young (4)

== See also ==
- Girls Planet 999, a Mnet reality competition show featuring female South Korean, Chinese and Japanese trainees.
- Boys Planet, a Mnet reality competition show featuring male trainees.
