= CSR (group) =

South Korean girl group

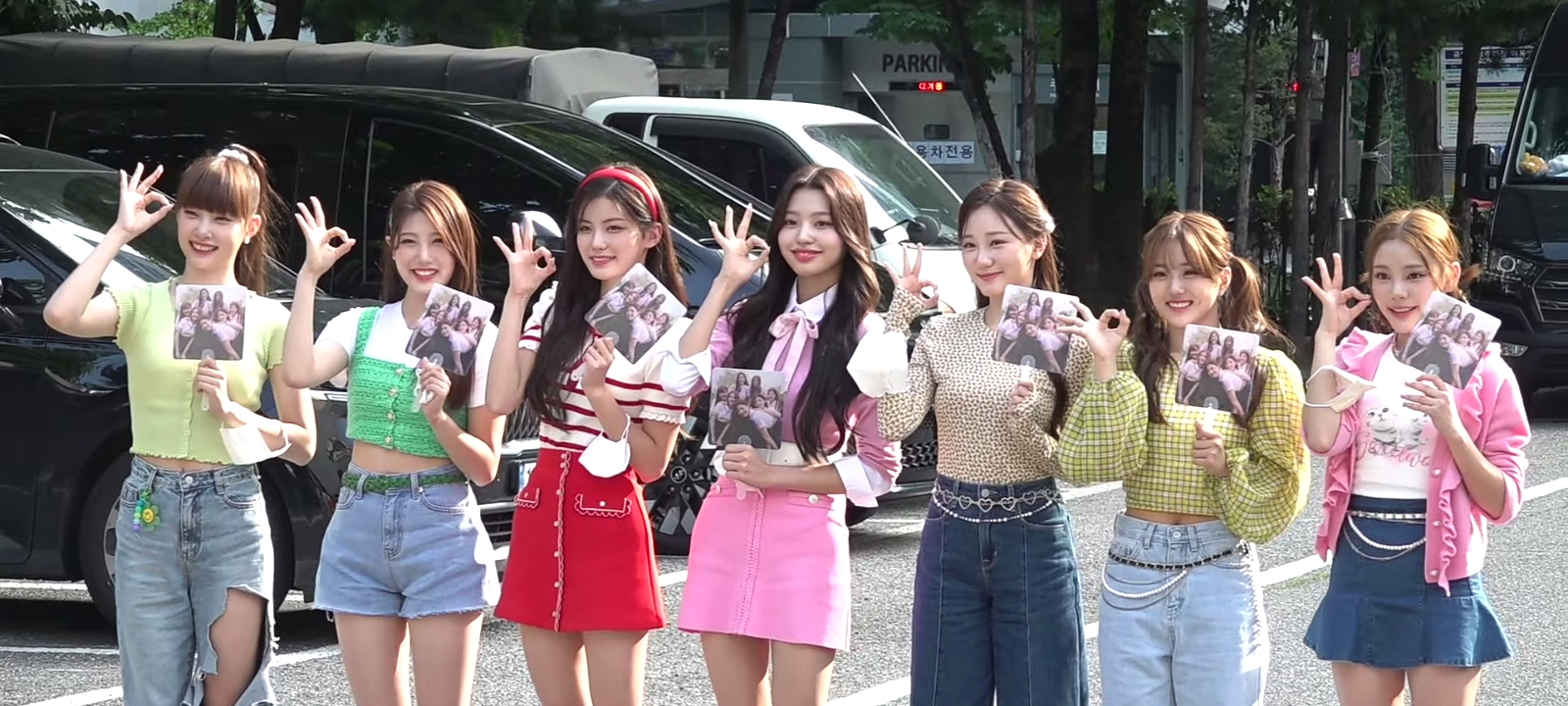
- CSR in July 2022; L–R: Geumhee, Seoyeon, Sua, Duna, Yeham, Yuna, Sihyeon

Background information
- Origin: Seoul, South Korea
- Genres: K-pop; dance; pop; funk
- Years active: 2022–present
- Label: A2Z Entertainment
- Members: Geumhee; Sihyeon; Seoyeon; Yuna; Duna; Sua; Yeham

CSR (/si ɛs ɑːr/; Korean: 첫사랑; RR: Cheotsarang; lit. 'First Love') is a South Korean girl group formed and managed by A2Z Entertainment. The septet—consisting of members Sua, Geumhee, Sihyeon, Seoyeon, Yuna, Duna, and Yeham—was at the time of debut composed entirely of 17-year-olds, a first time in the K-pop industry. They made their official debut on July 27, 2022, with the release of their first extended play (EP) Sequence: 7272.

== Name ==
CSR is an abbreviation of Cheotsarang (lit. First Love). The company stated on the name that, "taking advantage of all members being seventeen years old, the group plans to show various interpretations of first love and tell the story of the members growing up year by year".

== History ==
=== 2022: Introduction, debut with 'Sequence: 7272' and 'Sequence: 17&' ===
On July 11, 2022, A2Z Entertainment (formerly Pop Music) announced that they would be debuting their first girl group. The members were revealed through trailers on July 11 and July 12. On July 12, the group's management company announced that the septet would be releasing their debut extended play Sequence: 7272 on July 28. The music video for their debut lead single "Pop? Pop!" was released one day prior to the album's release, and the press showcase was also held at Mastercard Hall in Yongsan-gu, Seoul on the afternoon of the 27th. The album was officially released on July 28. The group made their broadcast debut on Mnet's M Countdown on July 28 to perform "Pop? Pop!".

On November 17, the group released their first single album titled Sequence: 17&, with its lead single "♡Ticon" (pronounced "love-ticon"). With this release, CSR earned their first music show win on KBS's Music Bank on December 2.

=== 2023: 'Delight', leader switch and 'HBD To You (Midnight Ver.)' ===
CSR released their Korean second extended play Delight, with its lead single "Shining Bright", on March 29, 2023. On July 27, the leader of CSR was switched from Sua to Duna, as the group has rotational leaders for every anniversary.

The group released a special digital single "HBD To You (Midnight Ver.)" on November 26, as commemoration of the first anniversary of the group's fandom, Maeum. On December 22, it was announced that the group would be active as a trio (Sihyeon, Yuna, Sua) for the time being, as the remaining four members were in an overseas schedule.

=== 2024: Chuang Asia: Thailand, L'heure Bleue: Prologue and Japan debut ===
On January 15, 2024, it was announced that members Geumhee, Seoyeon, Duna and Yeham would be participating in the survival show Produce Camp Asia: Thailand (or Chuang Asia). On March 2, Seoyeon, Yeham and Geumhee were eliminated in the first elimination round in episode 5, finishing in 53rd, 57th and 59th place respectively. On April 6, Duna was eliminated in the final episode, finishing 14th overall with 25,093,428 points, thus being unable to debut with Gen1es.

The group released their second single album L'heure Bleue: Prologue on June 11, with its lead single "Pretty Mob". This marked a year and 3 months after their previous comeback. In addition, the group released their first Japanese extended play, titled L'heure Bleue, on July 3, and held a 5-stop Japan tour from June 29 to July 19.

=== 2025-2026: Japan Tours, Red Soda Circle ===
In January 2025, CSR announced they would do their third Japan tour in February. In October 2025, Yuna and Yeham started a separate project on YouTube, called Red Soda Circle, using the names Rina and Haru respectively. This was later confirmed to be a separate project that both members were doing. Red Soda Circle would discontinue in May 2026. In December 2025, CSR did their 4th Japan tour. CSR did a 5th tour in Japan in February 2026. CSR released a new single, "Can't Hide Anymore" on March 26, 2026.

== Members ==
- Geumhee (금희)
- Sihyeon (시현)
- Seoyeon (서연)
- Yuna (유나)
- Duna (두나) - leader
- Sua (수아)
- Yeham (예함)

== Discography ==
=== Extended plays ===
List of extended plays, showing selected details, selected chart positions, and sales figures
Title	Details	Peak chart positions	Sales
Title	Details	KOR	Sales
Sequence: 7272	Released: July 28, 2022; Label: CSR E&M; Formats: CD, digital download, streaming; Track listing: 1. "72.72Hz" (열일곱); 2. "Pop? Pop!" (첫사랑); 3. "Manito" (비밀이야); 4. "Toi et Moi" (지금 너에게 보내); 5. "Euratcha!" (으랏차)	16	KOR: 17,414
Delight	Released: March 29, 2023; Label: CSR E&M; Formats: CD, digital download, streaming; Track listing: 1. "Signal" (열여덟); 2. "Shining Bright" (빛을 따라서); 3. "Picnic" (소풍); 4. "Dandelion" (마음이 피어요)	15	KOR: 26,034

=== Single albums ===
List of single albums, showing selected details, selected chart positions, and sales figures
Title	Details	Peak chart positions	Sales
Title	Details	KOR	Sales
Sequence: 17&	Released: November 17, 2022; Label: CSR E&M; Formats: CD, digital download, streaming; Track listing: 1. "♡Ticon" (러브티콘); 2. "Anding (&)"	31	KOR: 13,985
L'heure Bleue: Prologue	Released: June 11, 2024; Label: CSR E&M; Formats: CD, digital download, streaming; Track listing: 1. "Hello" (열아홉); 2. "Pretty Mob"	42	KOR: 6,870

=== Singles ===
List of singles, showing year released, selected chart positions, and name of the album
Title	Year	Peak position	Album
Title	Year	KOR Down.	Album
Korean
"Pop? Pop!" (첫사랑)	2022	87	Sequence: 7272
"♡Ticon" (LoveTicon, 러브티콘)	2022	63	Sequence: 17&
"Shining Bright" (빛을 따라서)	2023	56	Delight
"Pretty Mob"	2024	77	L'heure Bleue: Prologue
"Can't Hide Anymore" (숨길 수없는 맘인걸)	2026	127	Non-album single
Japanese
"Higher"	2024	—	L'heure Bleue
"—" denotes releases that did not chart or were not released in that region.-->

=== Promotional singles ===
List of promotional singles, showing year released, selected chart positions, and name of the album
Title	Year	Peak position	Album
Title	Year	KOR Down.	Album
"HBD To You" (Midnight Ver.)	2023	—	Non-album single
"HBD To You" (Korean Ver.)	2023	—	Non-album single
"HBD To You" (Jersey Club Remix)	2024	—	Non-album single
"—" denotes releases that did not chart or were not released in that region.-->

== Videography ==
=== Videography ===
Title	Year	Director(s)	Ref.
"Pop? Pop!"	2022	Choi Young-ji (Pinklabel Visual)	
"♡Ticon"	2022	Yoo Sung-kyun (Sunny Visual)	
"Shining Bright"	2023	Yoo Seong-gyun (Sunny Visual)	
"HBD To You" (Midnight Ver.)	2023	Cho Byung Hee	
"HBD To You" (Korean Ver.)	2023	Cho Byung Hee	
"Pretty mob 응원법"	2024	Jihee Ahn (GAMSEONGDOM PROJECT)	
"열아홉 (HELLO)"	2024	CSR	
"Higher"	2024	Unknown	

== Filmography ==
=== Television show ===
Year	Title	Role	Notes	Ref.
2024	Chuang Asia: Thailand	Contestant	Geumhee, Seoyeon, Duna, Yeham	
