= Chuang Asia: Season 2 =

2025 Thai TV series

- Season 2
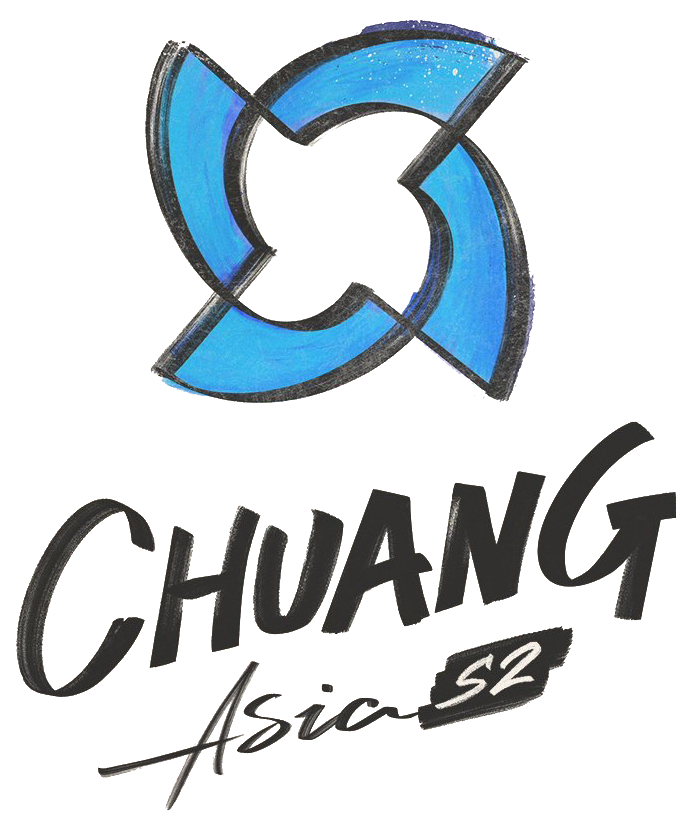
- Native name

Chinese name
- Traditional Chinese: 創造營亞洲第二季
- Simplified Chinese: 创造营亚洲第二季
- Literal meaning: Produce Camp Asia Season 2
Transcriptions
Standard Mandarin
- Hanyu Pinyin: chuàngzàoyíng yàzhōu dìèrjì
- No. of contestants: 60
- Location: Thailand
- No. of episodes: 10

Release
- Original network: Tencent Video
- Original release: February 2 – April 6, 2025

Season chronology
- ← Previous; Chuang Asia: Thailand

Chuang Asia: Season 2 (Chinese: 创造营亚洲第二季; pinyin: chuàngzàoyíng yàzhōu dìèrjì), also known as Chuang Asia 2025, is a Chinese/Thai reality competition show by Tencent. It is the sixth entry to the Chuang franchise, an idol survival series originally based in China, and the second entry to the Chuang Asia series, following Chuang Asia: Thailand. It premiered on February 2, 2025, and aired every Sunday at 16:50 (UTC+7) on WeTV.

The show gathered sixty male trainees from nine countries to fight for a spot in the boy group Next1de.

== Promotion ==
On May 10, 2024, a month after the end of Chuang Asia: Thailand, it was announced that a second season of the series is in the work, featuring male trainees. Application to audition for the show was opened on the same day, and ended on September 30.

In October, photos of trainees that have passed the audition surfaced online, including Thai actors Ben Benjamin and Ole Thanakorn known from the series Caged Again (2024) and Monster Next Door (2024) respectively, Thai idol Peanut from the boy group The7, and participants of past idol shows: Smart from Laz Icon (2021), Champ from Project Alpha (2022), and Hu Yetao from Produce Camp 2021 (2021), the fourth entry to the Chuang franchise.

On December 30, a teaser trailer was released, featuring winners of previous Chuang entries—Rocket Girls 101's Yang Chaoyue, R1SE's Zhou Zhennan and Yao Chen, BonBon Girls 303's Chen Zhuoxuan, Into1's Liu Yu, Rikimaru, Mika and Nine, and Gen1es—speaking about their experience in Chuang. That same day, the trainees of Chuang Asia: Season 2 appeared and performed at the Amazing Thailand Countdown 2025 event at the mixed-use development centre Iconsiam in Bangkok.

== Mentors ==
On December 24, a teaser image was posted on Chuang Asia's social media pages, hinting at the identity of the show's mentors. Two days later, leaked photos from the Chuang Asia: Season 2 set revealed that the show had begun filming. Chinese dancer and Seventeen member The8, Taiwanese actress Ariel Lin, Chinese singer Tia Ray, Thai actress and model Yaya, Thai singer and Chuang Asia: Thailand mentor Jeff Satur, and Thai rapper and Got7 member BamBam were also seen arriving to the set. All of them except Ariel Lin were later confirmed as the show's mentors on January 15, with The8 and BamBam additionally also serving as the show's producers. Ariel Lin was then announced as a guest mentor for the premiere episode.

Name	Age	Role	Notes
Tia Ray	40	Mentor	Chinese singer
Yaya Urassaya	32	Mentor	Thai actress
Jeff Satur	29	Mentor	Thai singer and actor
BamBam	27	Producers	Thai rapper and Got7 member
The8	27	Producers	Chinese dancer and Seventeen member

=== Guest Mentors ===
Episode	Name	Notes
Episode 1 & 2	Ariel Lin	Taiwanese actress and singer
Episode 4	Lisa	Thai rapper and Blackpink member
Episode 7	Rikimaru	Japanese singer and former Into1 member

== Episodes ==
=== Episode 1 & 2: Global Audition Stage ===
The show begins with the Grand Audition stage. The contestants are split into self-arranged groups, similarly to last season. This time, however, the contestants are graded individually. They are judged based on three criteria—vocals, dance, and visual—and are given a grade for each category The final grade is determined when the contestant receives two or three of the same grades, or to be determined by the producers BamBam and The8 if all three grades are different.

Group	Contestants	Song	Original Artist(s)	Grades			
Group	Contestants	Song	Original Artist(s)	Visual	Dance	Vocal	Final
Soda Mentos	Duy	"Welcome to the Show"	Day6	A	B	B	B
Soda Mentos	Gordon	"Welcome to the Show"	Day6	A	B	B	B
Soda Mentos	Hong Jin	"Welcome to the Show"	Day6	B	C	C	C
Soda Mentos	Kohi	"Welcome to the Show"	Day6	B	C	C	C
First Blood	Xiong	"Bite Me"	Enhypen	B	B	B	B
First Blood	Shen	"Bite Me"	Enhypen	C	C	C	C
First Blood	David	"Bite Me"	Enhypen	B	C	B	B
First Blood	KK	"Bite Me"	Enhypen	B	B	A	B
The Weather Forecast	Yuchen	"Tonight, It Will Rain" (今夜有雨)	h3R3	B	B	A	B
The Weather Forecast	Wuxun	"Tonight, It Will Rain" (今夜有雨)	h3R3	B	B	B	B
The Weather Forecast	Jingyu	"Tonight, It Will Rain" (今夜有雨)	h3R3	C	C	C	C
The Weather Forecast	Junhan	"Tonight, It Will Rain" (今夜有雨)	h3R3	C	C	C	C
The Weather Forecast	Guanming	"Tonight, It Will Rain" (今夜有雨)	h3R3	C	C	B	C
3D Surrounding	Alton Ang	"Swim Against the Current" (逆流而上)	Lil Ghost	B	B	B	B
3D Surrounding	Jackson	"Swim Against the Current" (逆流而上)	Lil Ghost	B	C	B	B
3D Surrounding	Myst	"Swim Against the Current" (逆流而上)	Lil Ghost	B	B	B	B
3D Surrounding	Tian Qi	"Swim Against the Current" (逆流而上)	Lil Ghost	C	C	C	C
3D Surrounding	Yao Zihao	"Swim Against the Current" (逆流而上)	Lil Ghost	A	A	A	A
Super Thai	Dorn	"Runaway Baby"	Bruno Mars	A	A	A	A
Super Thai	Plengthai	"Runaway Baby"	Bruno Mars	B	B	C	B
Super Thai	Tadalee	"Runaway Baby"	Bruno Mars	B	B	B	B
Super Thai	Peanut	"Runaway Baby"	Bruno Mars	B	B	B	B
Super Thai	Ninja	"Runaway Baby"	Bruno Mars	B	B	B	B
Super Thai	Thi-o	"Runaway Baby"	Bruno Mars	A	A	A	A
185+ Club	Peat	"Breeze Through Summer" (风吹一夏)	DP龙猪, Swei水, Rays陈袁	B	B	C	B
185+ Club	Lizi	"Breeze Through Summer" (风吹一夏)	DP龙猪, Swei水, Rays陈袁	B	B	B	B
185+ Club	Sichen	"Breeze Through Summer" (风吹一夏)	DP龙猪, Swei水, Rays陈袁	B	B	B	B
185+ Club	Xin	"Breeze Through Summer" (风吹一夏)	DP龙猪, Swei水, Rays陈袁	C	F	C	C
185+ Club	Omar	"Breeze Through Summer" (风吹一夏)	DP龙猪, Swei水, Rays陈袁	A	A	B	A
5 Stars Michelin	Earth	"Domino" (English version)	Stray Kids	C	F	F	F
5 Stars Michelin	Hikari	"Domino" (English version)	Stray Kids	B	C	F	C
5 Stars Michelin	Koshin	"Domino" (English version)	Stray Kids	C	C	C	C
5 Stars Michelin	Sena	"Domino" (English version)	Stray Kids	C	F	F	F
5 Stars Michelin	Sunny	"Domino" (English version)	Stray Kids	B	C	C	C
Maison B	Hikaru	"Get Loud"	Maison B (Note: Original song)	B	A	A	A
Maison B	Lyu	"Get Loud"	Maison B	B	B	B	B
Maison B	Shoya	"Get Loud"	Maison B	A	A	B	A
Why Not	Aguang	"Moonlight Thoughts" (寄明月)	Sing	F	F	F	F
Why Not	Ivan	"Moonlight Thoughts" (寄明月)	Sing	C	F	F	F
Why Not	Tzi Xuan	"Moonlight Thoughts" (寄明月)	Sing	F	F	F	F
Why Not	Xiaonian	"Moonlight Thoughts" (寄明月)	Sing	F	F	F	F
Friday At	Kevin	"Princess Rescue Plan" (公主营救计划)	Friday At	F	F	F	F
Friday At	Wanxin	"Princess Rescue Plan" (公主营救计划)	Friday At	C	F	C	C
Friday At	Weizhi	"Princess Rescue Plan" (公主营救计划)	Friday At	B	C	B	B
4inlove	Lu Junxi	"Magician" (爱无限)	Lexie Liu	C	F	F	F
4inlove	Smart	"Magician" (爱无限)	Lexie Liu	C	C	F	C
4inlove	Hu Yetao	"Magician" (爱无限)	Lexie Liu	A	A	A	A
4inlove	Gou Yi	"Magician" (爱无限)	Lexie Liu	B	B	B	B
4ever	B	"Situationship"	4Eve	C	C	C	C
4ever	Jiahao	"Situationship"	4Eve	C	C	F	C
4ever	Kao	"Situationship"	4Eve	C	F	F	F
4ever	Tata	"Situationship"	4Eve	F	F	F	F
Apple Mint	Bianura	"On The Way Home"	Apple Mint	C	C	C	C
Apple Mint	Ryan Winter	"On The Way Home"	Apple Mint	C	C	C	C
Racebace	Dong Dong	"La La La"	Racebace	A	A	A	A
Racebace	Jelly	"La La La"	Racebace	B	B	C	B
Racebace	Ricky	"La La La"	Racebace	B	B	B	B
Heart Stealers	Pray	"What Makes You Beautiful"	One Direction	B	B	B	B
Heart Stealers	Rexy	"What Makes You Beautiful"	One Direction	C	C	C	C
Heart Stealers	WhyLucas	"What Makes You Beautiful"	One Direction	A	A	B	A

==== Episode 2: Theme Song Mission ====
In the second half of episode 2, the contestants are introduced to the Theme Song Mission. The contestants are to perform the theme song "Skyline", and are judged based on one of the previous three criteria of their choice. Those who picked the 'Vocal' position had to sing through a headset, while those who chose the 'Visual' position had a camera focused on their facial expressions.

=== Episode 3 & 4: The First Public Stage ===
In the First Public Stage, the contestants are split into ten groups of six, with a pair of groups competing with each other. Within the team, the contestant with the highest vote will also be crowned the MVP.

The Centers for five of the teams were chosen from Class A by the trainees in Class B, C and F. The other five centers were chosen by each of the Class A members from Class B, C and F. The Center that the Class A trainee chose was the Center for their rival team. The choice of the songs were made based on the ranking of the contestants. Each center has to pick a different song. The other trainees chose in order of their class and ranking within their class.

Winning Group
Center
MVP
Center and MVP

No.	Song	Contestants
1	"A" by Got7	Omar
1	"A" by Got7	Junhan
1	"A" by Got7	Jingyu
1	"A" by Got7	Peat
1	"A" by Got7	Aguang
1	"A" by Got7	Sichen
1	"Ok, Ok, Ok" (好吗，好啦，好吧) by Lexie Liu	Kk
1	"Ok, Ok, Ok" (好吗，好啦，好吧) by Lexie Liu	Hong Jin
1	"Ok, Ok, Ok" (好吗，好啦，好吧) by Lexie Liu	Jiahao
1	"Ok, Ok, Ok" (好吗，好啦，好吧) by Lexie Liu	B
1	"Ok, Ok, Ok" (好吗，好啦，好吧) by Lexie Liu	Ivan
1	"Ok, Ok, Ok" (好吗，好啦，好吧) by Lexie Liu	Smart
2	"Bad News" by Kiss of Life	Dong Dong
2	"Bad News" by Kiss of Life	Hikaru
2	"Bad News" by Kiss of Life	Gordon
2	"Bad News" by Kiss of Life	Jelly
2	"Bad News" by Kiss of Life	Tian Qi
2	"Bad News" by Kiss of Life	Pray
2	"Hard to Say" (爱你但说不出口) by Karencici	Koshin
2	"Hard to Say" (爱你但说不出口) by Karencici	YuChen
2	"Hard to Say" (爱你但说不出口) by Karencici	David
2	"Hard to Say" (爱你但说不出口) by Karencici	Duy
2	"Hard to Say" (爱你但说不出口) by Karencici	Weizhi
2	"Hard to Say" (爱你但说不出口) by Karencici	Rexy
3	"Attention" by Charlie Puth	Ninja
3	"Attention" by Charlie Puth	Hu Yetao
3	"Attention" by Charlie Puth	WhyLucas
3	"Attention" by Charlie Puth	Myst
3	"Attention" by Charlie Puth	Alton Ang
3	"Attention" by Charlie Puth	Bianura
3	"Still Monster" by Enhypen	Xiong
3	"Still Monster" by Enhypen	Earth
3	"Still Monster" by Enhypen	Guanming
3	"Still Monster" by Enhypen	Sena
3	"Still Monster" by Enhypen	Shen
3	"Still Monster" by Enhypen	Wuxun
4	"Under The Moon Road" (月下路) by I'll Be Home Soon (等一下就回家)	Shoya
4	"Under The Moon Road" (月下路) by I'll Be Home Soon (等一下就回家)	Gou Yi
4	"Under The Moon Road" (月下路) by I'll Be Home Soon (等一下就回家)	Kohi
4	"Under The Moon Road" (月下路) by I'll Be Home Soon (等一下就回家)	Plengthai
4	"Under The Moon Road" (月下路) by I'll Be Home Soon (等一下就回家)	Tzi Xuan
4	"Under The Moon Road" (月下路) by I'll Be Home Soon (等一下就回家)	Wanxin
4	"Super" (손오공) by Seventeen	Dorn
4	"Super" (손오공) by Seventeen	Yao Zihao
4	"Super" (손오공) by Seventeen	Tadalee
4	"Super" (손오공) by Seventeen	Ricky
4	"Super" (손오공) by Seventeen	Peanut
4	"Super" (손오공) by Seventeen	Jackson
5	"True Love" (รักแท้) by NuNew	Sunny
5	"True Love" (รักแท้) by NuNew	Kao
5	"True Love" (รักแท้) by NuNew	Lu Junxi
5	"True Love" (รักแท้) by NuNew	Ryan Winter
5	"True Love" (รักแท้) by NuNew	Tata
5	"True Love" (รักแท้) by NuNew	Xiaonian
5	"Firework" by &Team	Thi-o
5	"Firework" by &Team	Hikari
5	"Firework" by &Team	Kevin
5	"Firework" by &Team	Lizi
5	"Firework" by &Team	Lyu
5	"Firework" by &Team	Xin

After all the rounds, it was announced that all members of the winning team would get an added 1000 voting points as benefit. The MVPs of the winning team each got an additional 2000 points as benefit and Omar from team 'A' was determined as the MVP of MVPs and received an additional 3000 points as benefit. The MVPs of all ten teams are said to perform the theme song at "Thailand's Biggest Music Festival"

At the end of the fourth episode, trainees had a Q&A session with Lisa from Blackpink.

=== Episode 5 ===
Episode 5 was a sports day event. The trainees formed into various teams according to their dorm rooms and participated in various games.

=== Episode 6: First Elimination ===
The number of trainees said to remain after the first eliminations were 35. There were ranges of ranking set up at different floors of the building. The trainees could choose to go up to one floor and check if their ranking was at that location. If they are, they had letter stating their rank in that range. If not, trainees had to await their ranking till all trainees completed this process. The results of the trainees that were remaining were announced upon completion of this process.

=== Episode 7 & 8: The Second Public Stage: Position Cooperation Stage ===
The remaining 35 trainees competed in 7 groups that focused on one of the 3 positions: Dance (3 groups), Vocal (3 groups) and Original (1 group). Each performance featured a guest performer. The on-site voting this week had a different approach where the on-site audience could vote for all trainees in the group if they wished to instead of the usual singular vote. However they could only vote once per trainee. As per usual, the trainee with the highest vote was the MVP and the team with the most on-site votes were the MVP team.

In episode 7, Rikimaru was a guest mentor for the trainees. He also choreographed the performance for "Mic Drop".

MVP Team
Center
MVP
Center and MVP

No.	Position	Song	Guest Performer	Contestants
1	Dance	"Mic Drop" (Steve Aoki remix) by BTS	Qiao Yiyu (Gen1es)	Aguang
1	Dance	"Mic Drop" (Steve Aoki remix) by BTS	Qiao Yiyu (Gen1es)	Koshin
1	Dance	"Mic Drop" (Steve Aoki remix) by BTS	Qiao Yiyu (Gen1es)	Lyu
1	Dance	"Mic Drop" (Steve Aoki remix) by BTS	Qiao Yiyu (Gen1es)	Omar
1	Dance	"Mic Drop" (Steve Aoki remix) by BTS	Qiao Yiyu (Gen1es)	Tian-Qi
2	Vocal	"Crush" by Sunkis, Astin, and Bren Joy	Didi (Gen1es)	Alton Ang
2	Vocal	"Crush" by Sunkis, Astin, and Bren Joy	Didi (Gen1es)	KK
2	Vocal	"Crush" by Sunkis, Astin, and Bren Joy	Didi (Gen1es)	Myst
2	Vocal	"Crush" by Sunkis, Astin, and Bren Joy	Didi (Gen1es)	Pray
2	Vocal	"Crush" by Sunkis, Astin, and Bren Joy	Didi (Gen1es)	Wuxun
3	Vocal	"Last Fireworks of The Summer Night" (夏夜最后的烟火) by Ele Yan	Yaya	Duy
3	Vocal	"Last Fireworks of The Summer Night" (夏夜最后的烟火) by Ele Yan	Yaya	Gordon
3	Vocal	"Last Fireworks of The Summer Night" (夏夜最后的烟火) by Ele Yan	Yaya	Jackson
3	Vocal	"Last Fireworks of The Summer Night" (夏夜最后的烟火) by Ele Yan	Yaya	Peat
3	Vocal	"Last Fireworks of The Summer Night" (夏夜最后的烟火) by Ele Yan	Yaya	Rexy
4	Dance	"When We Disco" by J. Y. Park and Sunmi	Naomi Wang	DongDong
4	Dance	"When We Disco" by J. Y. Park and Sunmi	Naomi Wang	Dorn
4	Dance	"When We Disco" by J. Y. Park and Sunmi	Naomi Wang	Ninja
4	Dance	"When We Disco" by J. Y. Park and Sunmi	Naomi Wang	Peanut
4	Dance	"When We Disco" by J. Y. Park and Sunmi	Naomi Wang	Xiong
5	Dance	"Python" by Got7	Li Zixuan	Tadalee
5	Dance	"Python" by Got7	Li Zixuan	Shen
5	Dance	"Python" by Got7	Li Zixuan	B
5	Dance	"Python" by Got7	Li Zixuan	Sunny
5	Dance	"Python" by Got7	Li Zixuan	Hikaru
6	Vocal	"I Dream" by 15&	Tia Ray	Smart
6	Vocal	"I Dream" by 15&	Tia Ray	Junhan
6	Vocal	"I Dream" by 15&	Tia Ray	Kohi
6	Vocal	"I Dream" by 15&	Tia Ray	Bianura
6	Vocal	"I Dream" by 15&	Tia Ray	Shoya
7	Original	"No Way" (Original song)	Ouyang Nana	Hu Yetao
7	Original	"No Way" (Original song)	Ouyang Nana	Thi-O
7	Original	"No Way" (Original song)	Ouyang Nana	Yao Zihao
7	Original	"No Way" (Original song)	Ouyang Nana	Yuchen
7	Original	"No Way" (Original song)	Ouyang Nana	WhyLucas

After all the rounds, it was announced that all members of the 'MVP Team' would get an added 10000 voting points as benefit. The MVPs of each team each got 10000 points as benefit each and Xiong from team 'When We Disco' was determined as the MVP of MVPs and received an additional 10000 points as benefit.

=== Episode 9: Second Elimination ===
The number of trainees after this elimination round is 21. These are the trainees that are part of the final episode- 'Debut Night: Live'. There was a separate live stream that showcased the eliminations of the contestants that did not make it through. In this episode, the remaining 21 contestant found their rankings. There were envelops, one with each trainees ranking, placed in a room. The trainees went and picked up an envelop, either their own or another. Once everyone had picked an envelop, the trainees took turns in opening the envelop and revealing the rankings. After the ranking announcement, the song selection for the final round took place. There will be three teams of seven, and the centers were chosen through a fan vote. The first, second and third place and thus the centers of the three songs were Hu Yetao, Thi-o and Dorn.

=== Episode 10: Grand Debut Night Live ===
The finale was telecasted live on the WeTV app, hosted by Bam Pitipat. The show opened with a performance of the signal songs of past Chuang seasons, featuring one member of the winning groups from each season—Meng Meiqi of Rocket Girls 101, Ren Hao of R1SE, Zhao Yue of BonBon Girls 303, Mika of Into1, and Qiao Yiyu of Gen1es. The finale consisted of two rounds of performances by the trainees, guest performers Gen1e, Mika, Meng Meiqi, and Smart and Boom from Top Form: The Series, and by the show's mentors BamBam, Yaya, Tia Ray, and Jeff Satur.

First Round Trainee Performances
No.	Song	Contestants
1	"Bodyguard" by Perses	Dong Dong
1	"Bodyguard" by Perses	Dorn
1	"Bodyguard" by Perses	Myst
1	"Bodyguard" by Perses	Omar
1	"Bodyguard" by Perses	Peanut
1	"Bodyguard" by Perses	Thi-o
1	"Bodyguard" by Perses	Tadalee
2	"If You Do" by Got7	Aguang
2	"If You Do" by Got7	Bianura
2	"If You Do" by Got7	Hikaru
2	"If You Do" by Got7	Kohi
2	"If You Do" by Got7	Koshin
2	"If You Do" by Got7	Ninja
2	"If You Do" by Got7	WhyLucas
3	"Liar" by Bus	Hu Yetao
3	"Liar" by Bus	KK
3	"Liar" by Bus	Shen
3	"Liar" by Bus	Wuxun
3	"Liar" by Bus	Xiong
3	"Liar" by Bus	Yao Zihao
3	"Liar" by Bus	Yuchen

Second Round Trainee Performances
No.	Song	Contestants
1	"Rose Blossom" by H1-Key	Dorn
1	"Rose Blossom" by H1-Key	Xiong
1	"Rose Blossom" by H1-Key	Ninja
1	"Rose Blossom" by H1-Key	Dong Dong
1	"Rose Blossom" by H1-Key	Peanut
1	"Rose Blossom" by H1-Key	Tadalee
1	"Rose Blossom" by H1-Key	Aguang
2	"Feel Special" by Twice	Hu Yetao
2	"Feel Special" by Twice	Yao Zihao
2	"Feel Special" by Twice	Yu Chen
2	"Feel Special" by Twice	Bianura
2	"Feel Special" by Twice	Kohi
2	"Feel Special" by Twice	Wuxun
2	"Feel Special" by Twice	Hikaru
3	"Happy" by Day6	Thi-O
3	"Happy" by Day6	Omar
3	"Happy" by Day6	Shen
3	"Happy" by Day6	Koshin
3	"Happy" by Day6	KK
3	"Happy" by Day6	WhyLucas
3	"Happy" by Day6	Myst

At the end of the show, the final members of the new group, Nextt1de, was announced in the following order: Xiong in 6th place, Omar in 5th, Shen in 4th, Yao Zihao in 7th, Hu Yetao in 3rd, Dorn in 1st, and Thi-o in 2nd.

== Contestants ==
Color key

Final members of Next1de
Contestants eliminated in the final episode
Contestants eliminated in the second elimination round
Contestants eliminated in the first elimination round

60 Contestants
Dorn (ดรณ์)	Thi-o (ไทโอ)	Hu Yetao (胡烨韬)	Shen (申义晟)	Omar (唐奥玛)
Xiong (林锦雄)	Yao Zihao (姚梓豪)	Ninja (นินจา)	Yuchen (曹屿辰)	Bianura
Dong Dong (东诘翔)	Koshin (小松倖真)	Aguang (刘云雨)	Hikaru (ヴァサイェガ光)	Peanut (พีนัท)
Kohi (이정현)	Tadalee (ธาดา)	WhyLucas (Lucas Wang; 黄宏溢)	Kk (杨棋)	Myst (徐亦圣)
Wuxun (武勋)	Junhan (高浚涵)	Lyu (児玉龍亮)	Alton Ang (洪麒越)	Jackson (黄嘉亨)
Sunny (叶竞谦)	Duy (Tường Duy)	Pray (杨浦睿)	Shoya (福田翔也)	Rexy (黄奕翔)
Smart (สมาร์ท)	Peat (พีท)	Gordon (罗泽康)	B (Bnapat; บี)	Tian Qi (黄天崎)
Xin (陈鼎新)	Plengthai (เพลงไท)	Hong Jin (Leow Hongjin)	Lu Junxi (陆俊熙)	Hikari (稲吉ひかり)
David (卫轩汶)	Sichen (王思晨)	Ryan Winter	Lizi (罗卓滨)	Tzi Xuan (翁子轩)
Kao (เก้า)	Earth (เอิร์ธ)	Ricky (冯俊岚)	Tata (ตาต้า)	Jiahao (杨佳豪)
Jelly (张国栋)	Gou Yi (苟一)	Kevin (肖凯文)	Jingyu (邱镜宇)	Wanxin (万鑫)
Sena (澤井星名)	Weizhi (覃炜致)	Guanming (苏冠铭)	Xiaonian (张铠鹏)	Ivan (付世杰)

== Ranking ==
Color key:

New top 7
Comeback to top 7

#	Ep. 2	Ep. 3		Ep. 4		Ep. 5		Ep. 6	Ep. 7	Ep. 8		Ep. 9	Ep. 10				
#	Ep. 2	Mid	End	Mid	End	Mid	End	Ep. 6	Ep. 7	Mid	End	Ep. 9	Mid 1	Mid 2	Mid 3	Mid 4	End
1	Hu Yetao	Hu Yetao	Hu Yetao	Thi-o (▲1)	Thi-o	Thi-o	Hu Yetao (▲2)	Hu Yetao	Dorn (▲2)	Dorn	Dorn	Dorn	Thi-o (▲2)	Dorn (▲1)	Dorn	Thi-o (▲2)	Dorn (▲2)
2	Thi-o	Thi-o	Thi-o	Hu Yetao (▼1)	Dorn (▲1)	Dorn	Thi-o (▼1)	Thi-o	Hu Yetao (▼1)	Hu Yetao	Hu Yetao	Hu Yetao	Dorn (▼1)	Thi-o (▼1)	Hu Yetao (▲1)	Hu Yetao	Thi-o (▼1)
3	Dorn	Dorn	Dorn	Dorn	Hu Yetao (▼1)	Hu Yetao	Dorn (▼1)	Dorn	Thi-o (▼1)	Thi-o	Thi-o	Thi-o	Hu Yetao (▼1)	Hu Yetao	Thi-o (▼1)	Dorn (▼2)	Hu Yetao (▼1)
4	Omar	Omar	Omar	Omar	Omar	Omar	Omar	Omar	Omar	Omar	Xiong (▲1)	Xiong	Xiong	Shen (▲2)	Xiong (▲1)	Xiong	Shen (▲2)
5	Yao Zihao	Yao Zihao	Yao Zihao	Yao Zihao	Yao Zihao	Xiong (▲1)	Xiong	Xiong	Yao Zihao (▲1)	Xiong (▲2)	Omar (▼1)	Yao Zihao (▲1)	Yuchen (▲3)	Xiong (▼1)	Omar (▲1)	Omar	Omar
6	Aguang	Xiong (▲2)	Xiong	Xiong	Xiong	Yao Zihao (▼1)	Yao Zihao	Yao Zihao	Ninja (▲1)	Yao Zihao (▼1)	Yao Zihao	Omar (▼1)	Shen (▲3)	Omar (▲1)	Shen (▼2)	Shen	Xiong (▼2)
7	Yuchen	Aguang (▼1)	Yuchen (▲1)	Yuchen	Yuchen	Ninja (▲1)	Ninja	Ninja	Xiong (▼2)	Ninja (▼1)	Ninja	Ninja	Omar (▼1)	Ninja (▲1)	Ninja	Yao Zihao (▲1)	Yao Zihao

=== Result ===
The finale was held on April 6, 2025, and was broadcast live. The final seven contestants debuted as Next1de.

#	Name	Votes	Company
1	Dorn (ดรณ์)	4,579,164	Handsome Entertainment
2	Thi-o (ไทโอ)	4,281,436	Bacillus Entertainment
3	Hu Yetao (胡烨韬)	3,692,691	Mistar
4	Shen (申义晟)	2,484,722	Original Plan
5	Omar (唐奥玛)	1,943,494	Youhug Media
6	Xiong (林锦雄)	1,793,535	Sense Stage
7	Yao Zihao (姚梓豪)	1,668,350	Top Class Entertainment

== Discography ==
=== Compilation albums ===
Title	Details
Skyline (天际线)	Released: February 9, 2025; Label: WeTV; Formats: Digital download, streaming; Track list: 1. "Skyline" (Chinese version); 2. "Skyline" (English version); 3. "Skyline" (Chinese instrumental version); 4. "Skyline" (English instrumental version); 5. "Skyline" (Warm variation); 6. "Skyline" (Narrative variation); 7. "Skyline" (Fresh morning variation); 8. "Skyline" (Honour & ritual variation); 9. "Skyline" (Lovely & cute variation); 10. "Skyline" (Rock & power variation); 11. "Skyline" (Electronic & live variation); 12. "Skyline" (Tension variation)

=== Singles ===
Title	Year	Album
"Skyline" (English version)	2025	Skyline
"No Way" (Live version)	2025	Non-album single

== Notes ==
Preceded by Chuang Asia: Thailand	Chuang (franchise); Chuang Asia: Season 2	Succeeded by —
