= Chuang (franchise) =

Reality television talent competition franchise

Produce Camp (Chinese: 创造营; pinyin: Chuàngzào Yíng), officially known as Chuang (Chinese: 创; pinyin: Chuàng; lit. 'Produce' or 'Create'), is an idol reality television talent competition franchise created by Chinese entertainment conglomerate Tencent. It is the officially sanctioned spin-off of the original South Korean franchise Produce 101, and CJ E&M is listed as one of the production companies for each season of Chuang. In contrast, iQiYi's rival idol survival show franchise Idol Producer, which features a nearly identical show format, was never officially sanctioned by CJ E&M, and caused CJ E&M to accuse iQiYi of plagiarism and copyright infringement.

In 2021, following the milk-wasting scandal in May, where a video showing several people dumping boxes of milk purchased to support trainees on the third season of iQiYi's idol competition show Youth With You went viral, and reports of fans of singer Kris Wu planning to rescue him from detainment after his arrest for allegations of rape in July, the Chinese government enacted a ban on the production and broadcast of idol competition shows in the country in September, in an effort to control the behavior of idol fandom which may go against societal values in China. This marks the end of the original Chuang series.

Tencent began working on bringing the franchise outside of China to circumvent the ban. This came into fruition in 2024 with the beginning of the Chuang Asia series, with plans of producing the show in different Asian countries each year.

== Versions ==
=== Original series ===
- Produce 101 China (2018), featuring female trainees.
- Produce Camp 2019 (2019), also known as Chuang 2019; featuring male trainees.
- Produce Camp 2020 (2020), also known as Chuang 2020; featuring female trainees.
- Produce Camp 2021 (2021), also known as Chuang 2021; featuring male trainees.

=== Chuang Asia series ===
- Chuang Asia: Thailand (2024), also known as Chuang Asia 2024; featuring female trainees.
- Chuang Asia: Season 2 (2025), also known as Chuang Asia 2025; featuring male trainees.

== See also ==
- Idol Producer (2018), a reality competition show by iQIYI featuring male trainees.
- Youth With You, a reality competition series by iQIYI and follow-up to Idol Producer.
  - Season 1 (2019), featuring male trainees.
  - Season 2 (2020), featuring female trainees.
  - Season 3 (2021), featuring male trainees.
