= Chuang Asia: Thailand =

2024 Thai TV series

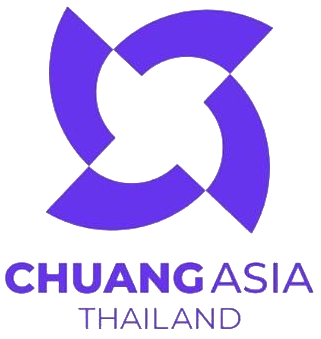
- Also known as: Chuang Asia 2024

Chinese name
- Traditional Chinese: 創造營亞洲
- Simplified Chinese: 创造营亚洲
- Literal meaning: Produce Camp Asia
Transcriptions
Standard Mandarin
- Hanyu Pinyin: chuàngzàoyíng yàzhōu

Thai name
- Thai: ช่วง เอเชีย ไทยแลนด์
- RTGS: Chuang Echia Thailaen
- IPA: [tɕʰûːaŋ ʔeː tɕʰiːa tʰaj lɛːn]
- Genre: Reality, Survival Competition
- Created by: CJ E&M
- Developed by: Tencent
- Starring: Jackson Wang; Mike Angelo; Jeff Satur; Nene; Ten
- Judges: "Citizen Producers" (Viewers)
- Opening theme: "Summer Dream"
- Country of origin: China
- Original languages: English; Thai; Chinese
- No. of episodes: 10

Production
- Production location: Thailand
- Camera setup: Multi-camera
- Running time: 117–202 minutes (uncut)
- Production companies: Tencent Penguin Pictures; The One Enterprise; Kantana Motion Pictures

Original release
- Network: Tencent Video (streaming); One 31 (TV broadcast)
- Release: February 3 – April 6, 2024

Related
- Produce 101; Produce 101 China; Produce Camp 2019; Produce Camp 2020; Produce Camp 2021; Chuang Asia: Season 2

Chuang Asia: Thailand (Thai: ช่วง เอเชีย ไทยแลนด์; Chinese: 创造营亚洲; pinyin: chuàngzàoyíng yàzhōu), also known as Chuang Asia 2024, is a Chinese/Thai reality competition show by Tencent, And co-licensed in Thai by The One Enterprise (ONEE) and Kantana Motion Pictures. It aired from February 3, 2024, to April 6, 2024, every Saturday at 22:00 (UTC+7) on WeTV.

It is the fifth entry to the Produce Camp franchise, an idol survival series originally based in China, and also the first entry to the Chuang Asia series.

The show brought 70 female trainees from different countries and agencies to form the international girl group Gen1es through global viewers' votes.

== Background ==
In September 2021, the Chinese government enacted a ban on the production and broadcast of idol competition shows in the country. To circumvent the ban, in July 2023, Tencent announced that the Chuang (also known as Produce Camp) franchise would have seasons set in other countries in Asia under the name Chuang Asia, starting with the first season in Thailand. Participant applications were opened from July 14 to October 31, 2023, for females of any nationality born before 2008. The contestants were officially revealed on January 15, 2024.

Chuang Asia: Thailand gathered 70 trainees who would be accepting several challenges to fight for a spot in the newest girl group. The show was filmed in Thailand, with recording having started at the end of 2023. On September 27, WeTV revealed Jackson Wang as the show's lead mentor during a press conference.

== Broadcast ==
The cut version of the show was simultaneously broadcast on One 31 in Thailand, AbemaTV in Japan, and RTV in Indonesia. The extended uncut version of each episode was also released later on the same night on WeTV globally.

=== Broadcast schedule ===
Episodes		Originally aired		Time slot	
Episodes		First aired	Last aired	Cut ver.	Uncut ver.
10	2	February 3, 2024	February 10, 2024	21:30 (UTC+7)	22:45 (UTC+7)
10	7	February 17, 2024	March 30, 2024	21:30 (UTC+7)	22:00 (UTC+7)
10	1	April 6, 2024		20:30 (UTC+7)	

== Mentors ==
In September 2023, Tencent Video announced the fifth season of the Produce 101 China series, with Jackson Wang as the nation's producer. In December 2023, Tencent Video announced four additional mentors: Jeff Satur, Mike Angelo, Ten of NCT, and Nene of BonBon Girls 303. Two former members of Into1—Santa and Nine—also appeared as guest mentors on episode six, and (G)I-dle's Minnie, actor Wang Ziqi and Win Metawin appeared as guest mentors on episode eight.

Name	Age	Role	Notes
Jackson Wang	29	Lead Mentor	Member of Got7
Mike Angelo	34	Mentor	Thai singer and actor
Jeff Satur	28	Mentor	Thai singer and actor
Nene (Zheng Naixin)	26	Mentor	Former member of BonBon Girls 303; winning member of Produce Camp 2020
Ten	27	Mentor	Member of NCT and WayV

== Contestants ==
Color key

Final members of Gen1es
Contestants eliminated in the final episode
Contestants eliminated in the third elimination round
Contestants eliminated in the second elimination round
Contestants eliminated in the first elimination round
Contestants left the show

70 Contestants
Qiao Yiyu (เชียว อี้อวี่)	Ruan (รุอัน)	Pailiu (ไผ่หลิว)	Yean (ยีนส์)	Elyn (อีลิน)
Wang Ke (หวัง เค่อ)	Xueyao (เสวี่ยเหยา)	Didi (ตีตี้)	Emma (เอมม่า)	Ilene (ไอลีน)
R-Jing (อาจิง)	Krista Shim (คริสต้า ชิม)	Praew (แพรว)	Duna (ดูนา)	Xuanning (ซวนหนิง)
Yuan Ke (หยวน เค่อ)	Lissa (ลิซซ่า)	Lu Yuting (หลู่ อวี่ถิง)	Jaoying (เจ้าหญิง)	Liliana Li (ลิเลียน่า ลี)
Jasmine (จัสมิน)	Caith (เคท)	MingMing (หมิงหมิง)	Rinka (รินกะ)	Wang Shengxi (หวัง เชิงสวี่)
Tegan (เทเเกน)	Mamcù (มัมชู)	Acare (เอเเคร์)	Ninnint (นิ่นนิ้น)	Coco (โคโค่)
Chacha (ชาช่า)	Yui (ยุย)	Ánh Sáng (อันซาง)	Akina (อากินะ)	Rei (เรอิ)
Panda (แพนด้า)	Vita (วิต้า)	Mao Xiuling (เหมาซีอูลิง)	Zhang Xiangyi (จาง เซียงอี้)	Mao Xiuting (เหมาซิวถิง)
Rose (โรส)	Kittie (คิตตี้)	Kanompang (ขนมปัง)	Pangjang (แพงจัง)	J JAZZSPER (เจ แจ๊สเปอร์)
Pream (พรีม)	Aun Aun (อันอัน)	Pimmie (พิมมี่)	Grace (เกรซ)	Devi (เดวิ)
Kaylen (เคเลน)	Ray (เรย์)	Seoyeon (ซอยอน)	Phingphing (ผิงผิง)	Natty (แนทตี้)
P.amp (พี.แอมป์)	Yeham (เยฮัม)	Chaba (ชบา)	Geumhee (กึมฮี)	Zoi (โซอี้)
Wanyen Jiayi (หว่านเหยิน เจียอี้)	Shye (เชย์)	Preemmy (พรีมมี่)	TN (ทีเอ็น)	TK (ทีเค)
Ma Liya (หม่า หลี่หยา)	Jessica (เจสซิก้า)	Wang Yibing (หวัง อี้ปิง)	Xinmeng (ซิน เหมิง)	Si Yang (ชี ยาง)

== Ranking ==
Color key:

New top 9
Comeback to top 9

#	Ep. 2		Ep. 3		Ep. 4		Ep. 5	Ep. 6				Ep. 7	Ep. 8		Ep. 9	Ep. 10		
#	Mid	End	Mid	End	Mid	End	Ep. 5	Midweek			End	Ep. 7	Mid	End	Ep. 9	Midweek		End
#	Mid	End	Mid	End	Mid	End	Ep. 5	Mar 3	Mar 5	Mar 7	End	Ep. 7	Mid	End	Ep. 9	Apr 3	Apr 5	End
1	Pailiu	Pailiu	Elyn (▲1)	Elyn	Elyn	Elyn	Pailiu (▲2)	Qiao Yi Yu (▲6)	Ruan (▲1)	Qiao Yi Yu (▲1)	Qiao Yi Yu	Qiao Yi Yu	Qiao Yi Yu	Qiao Yi Yu	Qiao Yi Yu	Qiao Yi Yu	Qiao Yi Yu	Qiao Yi Yu
2	Elyn	Elyn	Pailiu (▼1)	Pailiu	Ruan (▲2)	Lu Yuting (▲3)	Lu Yuting	Ruan (▲4)	Qiao Yi Yu (▼1)	Ruan (▼1)	Ruan	Ruan	Yean (▲4)	Ruan (▲1)	Ruan	Ruan	Pailiu (▲3)	Ruan (▲1)
3	Didi	Didi	Krista Shim (▲1)	Krista Shim	Krista Shim	Pailiu (▲1)	Rinka (▲7)	Elyn (▲2)	Wang Ke (▲1)	Yean (▲1)	Yean	Wang Ke (▲2)	Ruan (▼1)	Yean (▼1)	Yean	Yean	Ruan (▼1)	Pailiu (▼1)
4	Chacha	Krista Shim (▲1)	Didi (▼1)	Ruan (▲1)	Pailiu (▼2)	Ruan (▼2)	Didi (▲4)	Wang Ke (▲18)	Yean (▲1)	Elyn (▲1)	Elyn	Elyn	Wang Ke (▼1)	Wang Ke	Wang Ke	Emma (▲6)	Emma	Yean (▲1)
5	Krista Shim	Chacha (▼1)	Ruan (▲3)	Didi (▼1)	Lu Yuting (▲4)	Krista Shim (▼2)	Elyn (▼4)	Yean (▲3)	Elyn (▼2)	Wang Ke (▼2)	Wang Ke	Pailiu (▲5)	Elyn (▼1)	Elyn	Elyn	Pailiu (▲3)	Yean (▼2)	Elyn (▲1)
6	Ruan	Lu Yuting (▲-)	Yean (▲3)	Yean	Yean	Qiao Yi Yu (▲1)	Ruan (▼2)	Emma (▲9)	Krista Shim (▲1)	Emma (▲1)	Emma	Yean (▼3)	Emma (▲1)	Ilene (▲2)	Ilene	Elyn (▼1)	Elyn	Wang Ke (▲1)
7	Jaoying	Acare (▲1)	Acare	Acare	Qiao Yi Yu (▲1)	Yean (▼1)	Qiao Yi Yu (▼1)	Krista Shim (▲2)	Emma (▼1)	Ilene (▲3)	Didi (▲3)	Emma (▼1)	Krista Shim (▲1)	Didi (▲2)	Yuan Ke (▲4)	Krista Shim (▲4)	Wang Ke (▲4)	Xueyao (▲3)
8	Acare	Ruan (▼2)	Emma (▲3)	Qiao Yi Yu (▲2)	Didi (▼3)	Didi	Yean (▼1)	Xuanning (▲10)	Pailiu (▲8)	Xuanning (▲1)	Xuanning	Krista Shim (▲1)	Ilene (▲1)	Emma (▼2)	Pailiu (▲8)	Didi (▲4)	Didi	Didi
9	J Jazzsper	Yean (▲1)	Chacha (▼4)	Lu Yuting (▲2)	Emma (▲1)	Emma	Krista Shim (▼4)	Didi (▼5)	Xuanning (▼1)	Duna (▲9)	Krista Shim (▲4)	Ilene (▲3)	Didi (▲6)	Xueyao (▲1)	Xueyao	Xueyao	Ilene (▲1)	Emma (▼5)

=== Result ===
The finale was held on April 6, 2024. The final 9 members debuted as Gen1es.

#	Episode 10 (Total votes)		
#	Name	Votes	Company
1	Qiao Yiyu	80,796,328	HIJOY
2	Ruan	54,331,403	KISS Entertainment
3	Pailiu	50,093,565	Miss Grand International
4	Yean	49,983,314	KS Gang
5	Elyn	49,811,093	Yolo Onwards Culture
6	Wang Ke	49,290,773	AIM
7	Xueyao	48,166,930	Lize Media
8	Didi	48,118,412	Dalingdao Music
9	Emma	47,756,160	Changchun Qiyun

== Discography ==
=== Compilation albums ===
Title	Details
Summer Dream	Released: February 17, 2024; Label: WeTV, Ryce; Formats: Digital download, streaming; Track list: 1. "Summer Dream" (English version); 2. "Summer Dream" (Thai version); 3. "Summer Dream" (Live version); 4. "Summer Dream" (English instrumental version); 5. "Summer Dream" (Thai instrumental version); 6. "Summer Dream" (Live instrumental version)

== Franchise ==
Preceded by Produce Camp 2021	Chuang (franchise); Chuang Asia: Thailand	Succeeded by Chuang Asia: Season 2
