= Gen1es =

Thailand-based girl group

- Official logo

Background information
- Origin: Bangkok, Thailand
- Years active: 2024–2026
- Label: Ryce Entertainment
- Past members: Qiao Yiyu; Ruan; Pailiu; Yean; Elyn; Wang Ke; Xueyao; Didi; Emma

Gen1es (Chinese: 精灵少女Gen1es; pinyin: jīng líng shào nǚ Gen1es; lit. 'Elf Girls Gen1es') was a girl group based in Thailand under Ryce Entertainment. They were formed through the 2024 reality show Chuang Asia: Thailand on WeTV. The group consisted of nine members: Qiao Yiyu, Ruan, Pailiu, Yean, Elyn, Wang Ke, Xueyao, Didi and Emma. They debuted on August 22, 2024, with the single "Hourglass".

== History ==
=== Pre-debut: Chuang Asia: Thailand and "Lucky Bell" ===
In July 2023, Tencent announced Chuang Asia: Thailand, the first international entry to the Chuang franchise originally based in China, which will take place in Thailand. The show brought together seventy female trainees to form a nine-member girl group. It aired from February 3, 2024, to April 6, 2024. During the final episode, the group was formed and performed the song "Lucky Bell". "Lucky Bell" was later released as the group's pre-debut single on April 26.

Prior to Chuang Asia: Thailand, Xueyao competed on Chuang 2020 (2020), the third season of the Chuang franchise. Ruan and Wang Ke also competed on the South Korean idol reality shows Girls Planet 999 (2021) and Produce 48 (2018) respectively. Qiao Yiyu gained some recognition in China for competing in the reality shows Great Dance Crew (2022) and Youth π Plan (2023). Pailiu is a Thai-Vietnamese model under Miss Grand Thailand and was the fifth runner-up in the 2023 pageant. Yean debuted as a soloist in 2020 under Khaosan Entertainment, and Elyn was a child actress who appeared in the Malaysian drama Geng UPSR (2015–2016).

=== 2024–2026: Group activities ===
Preparation for the group's debut with their first extended play (EP) began in May 2024. Their debut single, "Hourglass", was released on August 22, preceding the release of their first EP of the same name on September 6. The EP had a physical release in China in January 2025.

On April 6, 2025, during the live finale of Chuang Asia: Season 2, Gen1es debuted and performed their new single "Vroom", with member Qiao Yiyu further announcing that they are working on their next album. The single was released on June 21, and will be included in their second EP Gen1. The second single from the EP, "Rewrite", was released on July 12. Pre-sale for the physical EP began on October 21.

On February 3, 2026, Ryce announced that Gen1es will be disbanding on February 6. The group was initially contracted to last three years till 2027.

== Other ventures ==
=== Endorsements ===
In September 2024, Gen1es became the first presenters for the cosmetic brand Tellme Darling by Daring&Co.

== Members ==
- Qiao Yiyu (乔一魚)
- Ruan (池間琉杏)
- Pailiu (กมลวลัย ประจักษ์รัตนกุล)
- Yean (ปพิชญา เอกสุภรณ์)
- Elyn (梁愉苓)
- Wang Ke (王珂)
- Xueyao (曾雪瑤)
- Didi (欧阳娣娣)
- Emma (朱奕萌)

== Discography ==
=== Extended plays ===
List of extended plays, showing selected details
Title	Details
Hourglass	Released: September 6, 2024; Label: Ryce; Formats: CD, digital download, streaming; Track listing: 1. "Lucky Bell"; 2. "Hourglass"; 3. "Dot Dot Dot"; 4. "Sick of You"
Gen1	Released: July 21, 2025; Label: Ryce, Hym-Originals; Formats: CD, digital download, streaming; Track listing: 1. "Vroom"; 2. "Rewrite"; 3. "Pretty Rose"; 4. "Juice"; 5. "WiFi"

=== Singles ===
List of singles, showing year released, and name of the album
Title	Year	Album
"Lucky Bell"	2024	Hourglass
"Hourglass"	2024	Hourglass
"Vroom"	2025	Gen1
"Rewrite"	2025	Gen1

== Filmography ==
=== Reality shows ===
Year	Title	Notes	Ref.
2024	Chuang Asia: Thailand	Reality show that determined the members of Gen1es	
2024	The Truth 2	Ruan, Pailiu, Yean and Elyn absent	
2024	Super Nova Games 5	Contestants	

=== Web shows ===
Year	Title	Ref.
2024	Gen1es' Journey	

== Awards and nominations ==
Name of the award ceremony, year presented, category, nominee of the award, and the result of the nomination
Award ceremony	Year	Category	Nominee / Work	Result	Ref.
Tencent Video All Star Night	2024	Overseas Group with Greatest Potential	Gen1es	Won	
