= Super Impassioned Net Generation =

Chinese girl group

Super Impassioned Net Generation (SING)
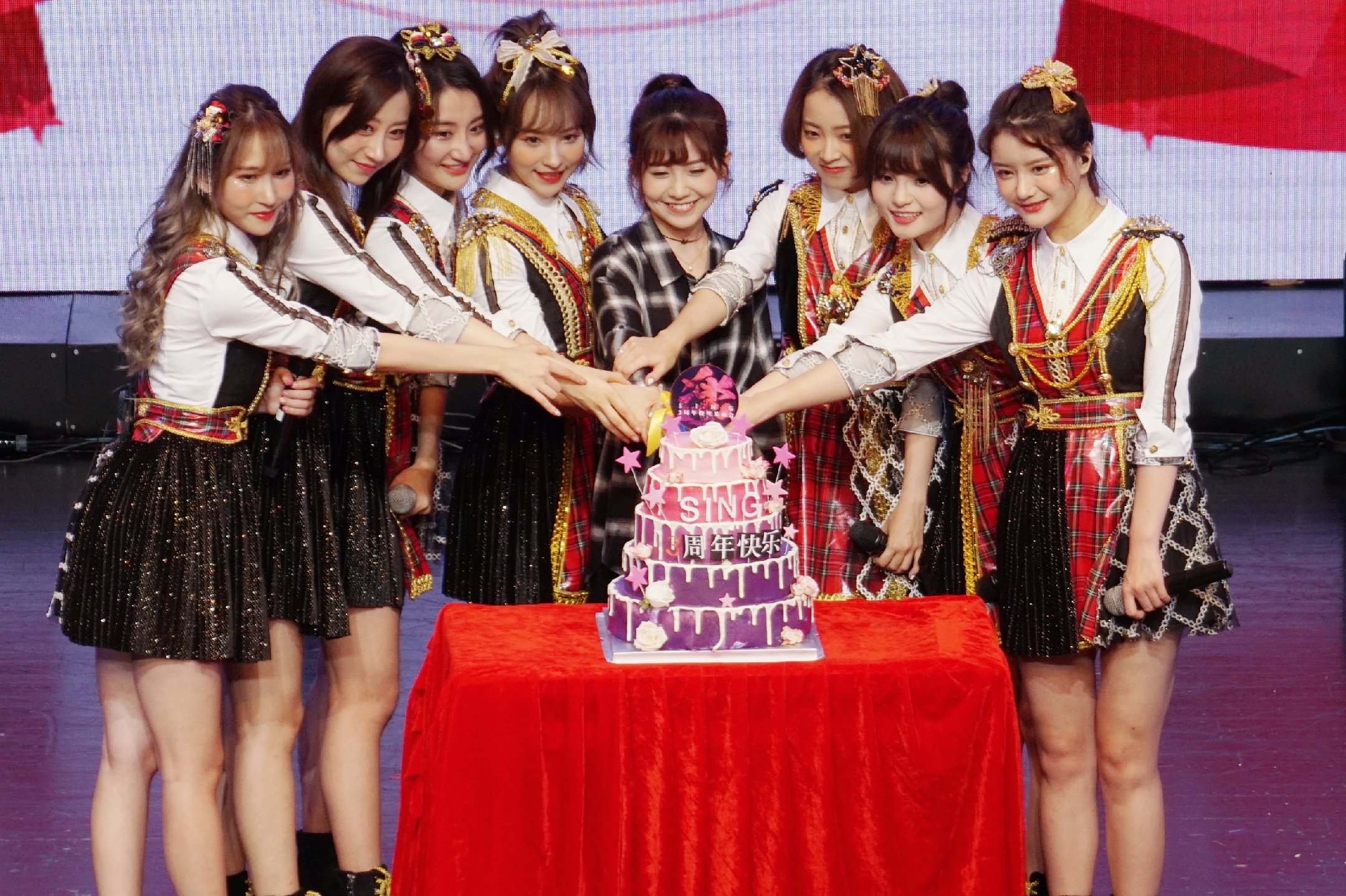
- SING 3rd Anniversary on Aug 27, 2018

Background information
- Also known as: SING Girls
- Origin: China
- Genres: C-pop; Mandopop; Dance music; Electro house
- Years active: 2015–present
- Labels: KuGou; Qigu Culture; JSJ International Entertainment
- Members: Xu Shiyin; Lin Jiahui; Zhong Ying; Ma Xuejiao; Yin Wanrui
- Past members: Lin Jinyi; Cai Sha; Wang Wenjie; Chen Wenrou; Gong Tianying; Lai Meiyun; Bian Li; Chen Li; Wu Yao; Jiang Shen; Lin Hui; Qin Yu
- Website: sing.fanxing.kugou.com

SING, also known as Super Impassioned Net Generation (simplified Chinese: SING女团; traditional Chinese: SING女團; pinyin: /sɪŋ/ nǚ tuán; lit. 'Sing Girls' Group'), is a Chinese girl group formed by KuGou Music in 2015 with 10 members, selected from different regions of China. The current line-up is composed of 5 members and they primarily produce electronic dance music inspired by traditional Chinese music.

== History ==
=== 2015: Formation and debut ===
SING debuted in 2015 with 10 members on August 10, 2015. Given the limitations on budget, the group did not rely on income from concert tickets, instead gaining primary revenues from royalty, licensing fees, and selling merchandise.

=== 2016: Line-up changes ===
Four members suspended their activities in 2016, and three new members were added to the group.

=== 2017: Change in sound ===
In September, SING released the single "Moonlight Thoughts" (Chinese: 寄明月; pinyin: Jì míngyuè), their first ever Chinese-style electronic dance song. The single helped the group gain popularity and momentum in China. In December, the group held a Christmas live concert named Part of Me. Following the concert, Lin Jinyi suspended her activities due to health concerns.

In November, the group released their first international album SING on iTunes and Spotify.

=== 2018-2019: More ===
Three members of SING participated in the reality idol competition Produce 101 in March 2018. Jiang Shen and Xu Shiyin finished at 23rd and 75th place, respectively; Lai Meiyun made the final line up at 6th place and successfully debuted as a member of Rocket Girls.

SING performed on the 2nd International Youth Conference in Shenzhen on August 12. Sophie presented a speech titled, "Integration of Youth Culture and Traditional Culture from the Perspective of Electronic Chinese Style Music" to introduce insights on young people's inheritance and innovation in traditional Chinese culture based on her personal experience.

SING joined the TV Show competition "Wo Yao Shang Chun Wan" with "Moonlight Thoughts" on December 29, 2018. This TV show competition selected the performance for the CCTV Spring Festival Event. SING lost but advanced to the final through fan voting.

Xu Shiyin released her first solo "Bai Yi Shao Nian" on March 14 and its accompanying music video on June 26. The song was used as the ending theme for the drama, "I Will Never Let You Go" which aired on January 8, 2019.

The variety show SING HOME began airing in 2019, with each episode having a different theme and featuring content such as playing games, team discussions, and interacting with fans.

Debbie released her first solo song, "Mermaid" on January 4, and its music video on January 21. Debbie explained that she chose the title because she hoped her first solo would attract people to her, like the singing of a mermaid.

SING performed the song "Ru Meng Ling" in the final of "Wo Yao Shang Chun Wan" (simplified chinese: 我要上春晚) on January 26. They lost the judges vote 0–5 to their competitor. SING, Han Xue, and Wu Mochou performed the song "Hui Jia Guo Nian La"(simplified chinese: 回家过年啦) on the CCTV Internet Spring Festival Event on January 28. SING, Han Xue, and Oscar Qian performed the song "Nian Ye Fan" for the Hunan TV Spring Festival Event on January 29. SING performed the song "Huan Le Zhong Guo Nian" for the Jiangxi TV Spring Festival Event on February 3. SING performed the song "Tuan Tuan Yuan Yuan" for the CCTV Spring Festival Event Countdown on February 4. SING performed the song "Ru Meng Ling" (simplified chinese: 如梦令) and "Qian Nian" for the Guangdong TV Spring Festival on February 4. Their song "Tuan Tuan Yuan Yuan" was used as the background music of "The Reunion" on the 7th Hong Kong Lunar New Year Firework Show on February 6.

Xu Shiyin released her second solo "You Are Not Wrong" on March 14. The song was written by Shiyin and composed by Mikey Jiao. It represented the discovery of her career and thanked the people who supported her. She also released her third song "Yi Sheng Tian Ya" on 12 November.

Debbie was invited to participate in the Asian Cultural Carnival on May 15. She performed the song "A Youthful Asia" with William Chan, Zhang Yixing, and Young Asia Group. SING performed the songs "Ru Meng Ling" and "Bu Xian" (simplified chinese: 不羡) on Yo!Bang on May 26.

Bian Li released her first solo "Someday" on July 5. Later, on November 4, she released her second song "Deng".

On March 17, SING performed at the One Yeah Pop Up+ Festival held in Xi'an. SING then performed the songs "Guo Chao Shi Dai" and "Chuan Ren" in another edition of the same festival on May 11.

On August 8, SING released their Chinese Style Electronic Music digital album Jie Meng. The album includes three songs, which are "Jie Meng", "Shao Nian Zhong Guo" and "Pi Pa Xing". SING celebrated their 4th anniversary since debut and also released the song "Hua Qiang" on October 25 in Beijing, China. On November 17, SING was announced as the winner of the Rising Popularity Group of the Year award and also performed the song "Hua Qiang" at the Asia Music Festival 2019 in Shenzhen, China. On December 8, SING was announced as the winner of the New CPOP Generation of the Year award and also performed the song "Jie Meng" at the Tencent Music Entertainment Festival 2019 in Macau, China.

=== 2020-2022: Graduation, changes in member line up ===
After Rocket Girls 101's disbandment in 2020, Lai Meiyun did not return to SING and graduated.

On December 26, Bian Li and Chen Li both graduated from the group, with new members being added afterwards. In 2021, Qin Yu, Wu Yao, Lin Hui, and Jiang Shen graduated from the group in May 2021.

Lin Jiahui, Zhong Ying, Ma Xuejiao, and Yin Wanrui debuted with SING in 2021, however Zhong Ying, Lin Jiahui, and Ma Xuejiao were present for the practice room video of "Chu Meng Yao" (simplified chinese: 初梦谣), along with the previous 4 members that graduated in 2021, as it was filmed before they graduated.

=== 2024-present: Contunitation ===
Ivan, Zong Siyu, Xu Shiyin, and Ma Jiao debuted the song, Up Spring and Sigh.

== Members ==
Current

- Xu Shiyin (许诗茵) (Valentina)
- Lin Jiahui(林嘉慧) (Coco)
- Zhong Ying (钟颖) (Beverly)
- Ma Xuejiao (马雪娇) (Meo)
- Yin Wanrui (尹万蕊)

Former

- Lin Jinyi (林津伊) (Magical)
- Cai Sha (蔡莎) (SaSa)
- Wang Wenjie (王文洁) (Candy)
- Chen Wenrou (陈温柔) (Ruby)
- Gong Tianying (龚天颖) (Lorinda)
- Lai Meiyun (赖美云) (Sunny) (Now a soloist under Qigu)
- Bian Li (边丽) (Jessica)
- Chen Li (陈丽) (Pink)
- Jiang Shen (蒋申) (Debbie)
- Qin Yu (秦瑜) (Sophie)
- Lin Hui (林慧) (Haha)
- Wu Yao (吴瑶) (Miko)

== Discography ==
=== Studio albums ===
Title	Album details
SING (SING同名专辑)	Released: December 29, 2017; Label: JSJ International Entertainment; Formats: CD, digital download
Jie Meng (解梦)	Released: August 10, 2019; Formats: digital download

== Accolades ==
=== Ku Music Asian Music Awards ===
Year	Nominee / work	Award	Result
2018	S.I.N.G (SING Girls)	Rising Popularity Award	Won

=== Tencent Streaming Award ===
Year	Nominee / work	Award	Result
2018	S.I.N.G (SING Girls)	2017 Rising Popularity Award	Won

=== China Asia Musia Festival (AMF) ===
Year	Nominee / work	Award	Result
2019	S.I.N.G (SING Girls)	2019 Rising Popularity Award	Won

=== Tencent Music Entertainment Awards 2019 ===
Year	Nominee / work	Award	Result
2019	S.I.N.G (SING Girls)	New CPOP Generation of the Year	Won

== Filmography ==
=== Films ===
Year	Title	Notes
2017	Our Shining Days	As S.I.N.G members

== Product Endorsements ==
Year	Project	Product
2016	Online Game	Zhu Zai Xi You (simplified chinese: 主宰西游)
2018	Mobile Game	Ark Order (simplified chinese: 方舟指令)
2019	Skin Care Product	Mei Fu Bao (simplified chinese: 美肤宝)
2019	Women Healthy Product	Always Being Clean (simplified chinese: ABC个人护理)
