= Fu Jing (singer) =

Chinese singer

- 傅菁
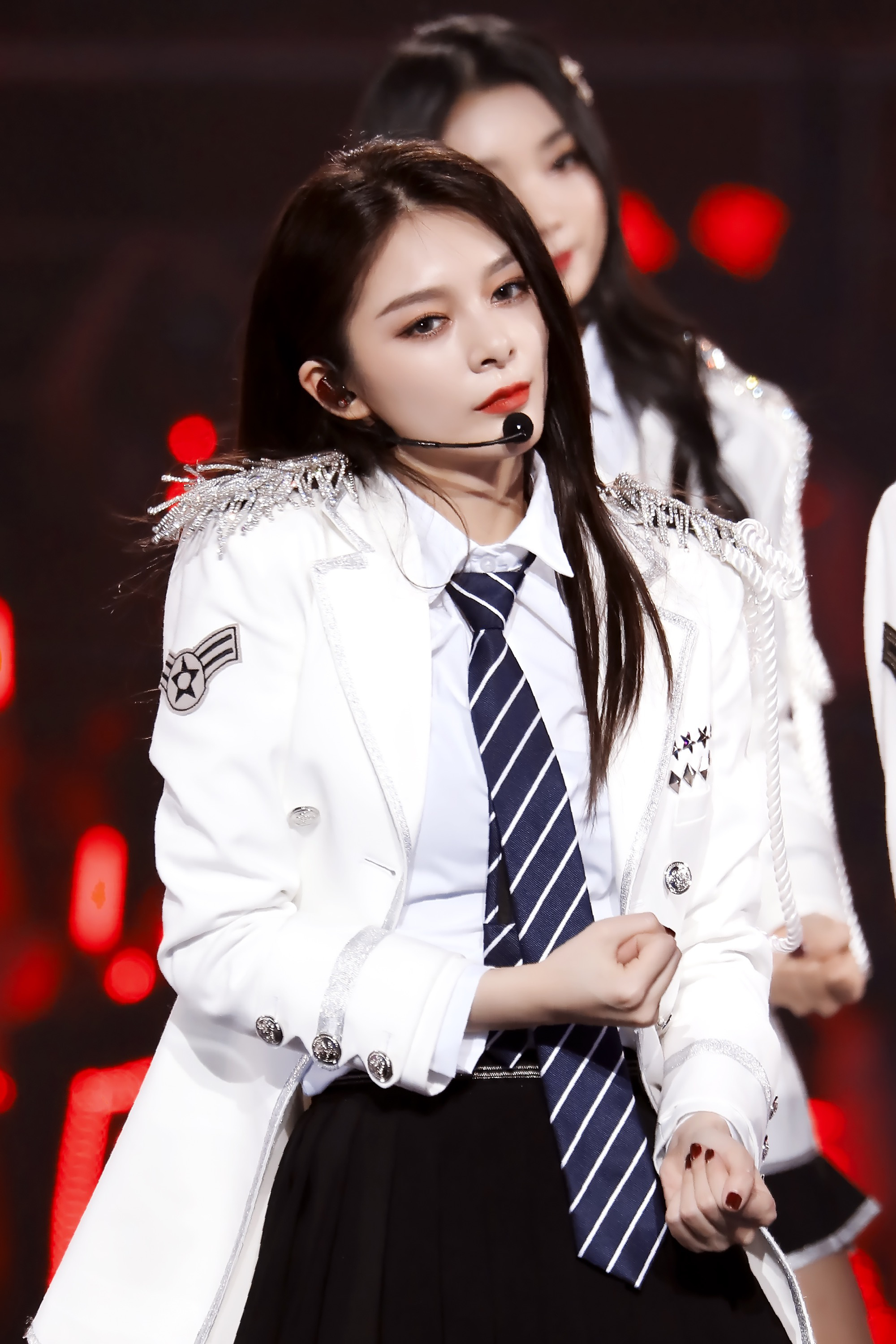
- Fujing at the Guangzhou Rocket Girls Concert
- Born: June 29, 1995 (age 30); Shaoyang, Hunan, China
- Other name: Jinna
- Occupations: Singer; actress
- Years active: 2017–present
- Musical career
- Genres: C-pop; Mandopop; Dance-pop
- Label: Banana Culture

Fu Jing (Chinese: 傅菁, born June 29, 1995) is a Chinese singer and actress signed under Banana Culture Music Co., Ltd. After finishing tenth in Tencent's girl group survival show Produce 101, she debuted as a member of Rocket Girls 101.

== Early life ==
Fu was born on June 29, 1995, in Shaoyang, Hunan. She is the second child in the family. She has an elder sister, Fu Ying, a younger sister and a younger brother. She started working in 2013, at the age of 18. She tried being a dance teacher and yoga trainer besides others. Besides working, she also entered Xiangnan University where she completed her scholarship. In 2016, she participated in the Trainee18 recruitment and became a trainee under Banana Culture Music Co., Ltd.. She appeared in Hunan Television television series Happy Camp's advertisement screen and the Youku series titled Mars Intelligence Agency.

== Career ==
=== Trainee ===
In 2017, she officially became a member of Trainee18. She first performed with the members of Trainee18 at the B.I.G Carnival. In April 2018, she represented Trainee18 female group to participate in China's Produce 101. In May, she participated in the "Walking the Public Welfare Season" theme activity "Walking Dance". She uploaded her own "walking dance" video on her social media, hoping to call on people to walk daily and make donations.

=== During Produce 101 ===
In her first performance, she came in second place for the Center position (C) under the strength category and formed the team with Wang Mohan, Qi YanDi, Wang Ting, etc. and sang the song "No need to spend money". In the second performance also as the C position, she formed a team with Zhang Zining, Qi YanDi and Luo Yijia, singing the song "Liar". Her third performance was performed together with Wu Xuanyi, Fan Wei, Su Yuqi, Luo Yijia, and Gao Yingxi singing the song "Shiny". In June, after several knockouts rounds, she was nominated to be in the top 22 of "Produce 101" finals. At the same time, she also filmed a set of plane photo for the fashion magazine "Red Show GRAZIA". On 23 June, she clinch the 10th position out of 11 members with Meng Meiqi emerging as the 1st, followed Wu Xuanyi, Yang Chaoyue, Duan Aojuan, Yamy, Lai Meiyun, Zhang Zining, Sunnee, Li ZiTing and Xu Mengjie as the last member. The team was then named as Rocket Girls 101.

=== Debut as Rocket Girls 101 ===
On 23 June 2018, she officially debuted and released the single "Rocket Girls"; the next day, participated in Hunan Satellite TV "Happy China Graduation Songs", completed the first group show. On 18 August, the group's first mini-album "Collide" was released with the title song "Collide", and a new song conference was held on the same day. The second, third and fourth "Light", "Sailor Moon" and "Born to Win" was released on 14, 28 September and 12 October respectively. During countdown, Rocket Girl 101 participated in the Hunan Satellite TV "Happy China 2018-2019 New Year Concert" performance.

=== Set Up Personal Studio ===
After Rocket Girls 101 disbanded on 23 June 2020, she officially set up her personal studio on 24 June 2020. She then released her first EP.

== Discography ==
=== Solo ===
Title	Year	Album	Notes
想	2019		Blowing In The Wind OST
阿丽塔 (Alita)	2019	立风	
硝烟四起	2020	发光体	1st EP
发光体	2020	发光体	1st EP
荒唐	2020	发光体	1st EP
空城记	2020		Dance of the Phoenix OST
我愿为你侧耳倾听	2021	我愿为你侧耳倾听	EP
她说爱情不会降临到她生上	2021	当众孤独	EP
最佳同谋	2021	当众孤独	EP
当众孤独	2021	当众孤独	EP
后翼弃兵	2021	当众孤独	EP
奔三	2021	当众孤独	EP
蝴蝶效应	2021		
让我们荡起双桨	2021		

=== Soundtrack appearances ===
Title	Year	Album	Notes
"101个愿望 (101 Wishes)" (with Yang Chaoyue and Lai Meiyun)	2018	Non-album single	

== Filmography ==
=== Television series ===
Year	English title	Chinese title	Role	Network	Notes
2020	You are my Destiny	你是我的命中注定	Shi Anna	Tencent Video	Supporting Role
2020	Dance of the Phoenix	且听凤鸣	Zuo Qingying/ Zuo Qingluan	Tencent Video	Supporting Role
2021	Out of the Dream	梦见狮子	Guan Jiu	iQiyi	Supporting Role
2022	Shining for One Thing	一闪一闪亮星星	Gao Ge	iQiyi	Supporting Role
2022	The Letter from the Cloud	云中谁寄锦书来	Zhou Yue	Mango TV	supporting Role
2024	Heros	天行健	Huo Qin	Tencent Video & iQiyi	Supporting Role
TBA	Blemish Flaw	棕眼之谜	Liu Wei	iQiyi	Supporting Role
TBA	Inspire	有喜的日子	Jin Yutong	YOUKU	Supporting Role
TBA	The Glory	贵女	Chai Jing	Tencent Video	Supporting Role

=== Variety and reality shows ===
Year	English title	Chinese title	Network	Notes
2018	Produce 101	创造101	Tencent Video	Contestant; 10th place
2018	Rocket Girls 101 Research Institute	火箭少女101研究所	Tencent Video	Member
2019	Rampage 20's Season 1	横冲直撞20岁第一季	Tencent Video	Member
2019	We Are Grown Up	我们长大了	Tencent Video	Panelist
2020	Rampage 20's Season 2	横冲直撞20岁第二季	Tencent Video	Member
2020	We are Blazing	炙热的我们	Tencent Video	Episode 3 - Episode 8
