= Wu Xuanyi =

Chinese singer and actress (born 1995)

- 吴宣仪
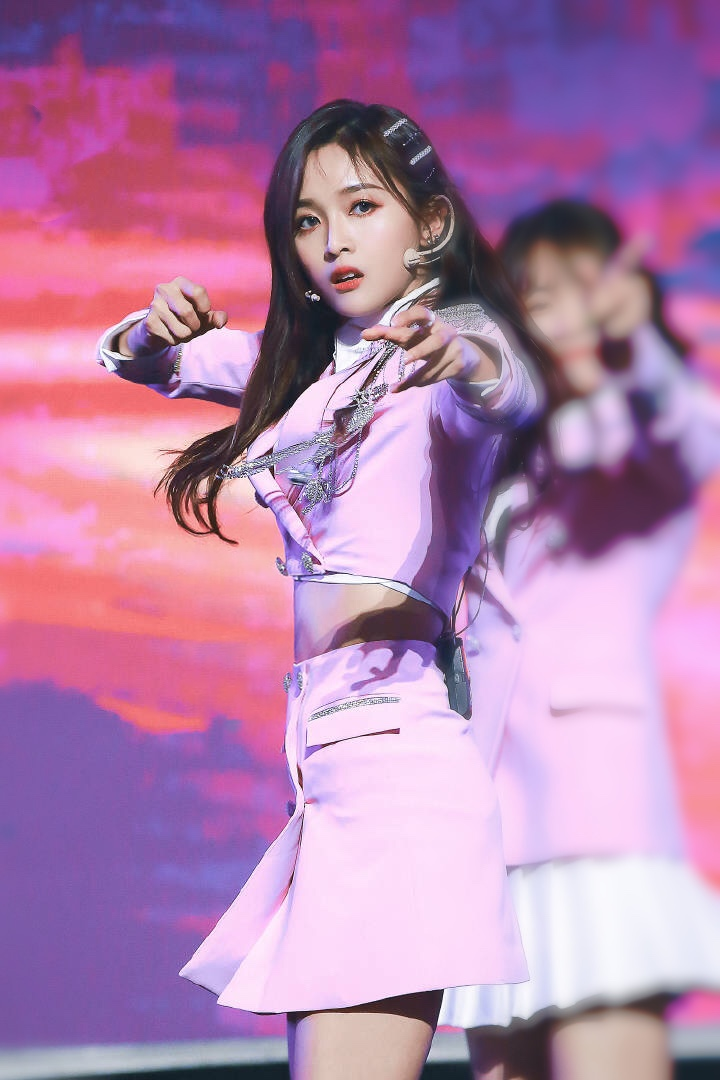
- Xuanyi in 2019 at Rocket Girl 101's 1st anniversary concert
- Born: Wu Xuanyi; January 26, 1995 (age 31); Haikou, Hainan, China
- Occupations: Singer; actress
- Musical career
- Genres: K-pop; mandopop
- Instrument: Vocals
- Years active: 2016–present
- Labels: Starship; Yuehua; Wajijiwa (Note: As a member of Rocket Girls 101 only.)
- Formerly of: WJSN; Rocket Girls 101; Starship Planet

Chinese name
- Chinese: 吴宣仪
- Hanyu Pinyin: Wú Xuānyí

Korean name
- Hangul: 선의
- RR: Seonui
- MR: Sŏnŭi

Wu Xuanyi (born January 26, 1995) is a Chinese singer and actress. She began her career in 2016, as a member of the South Korean girl group WJSN. She took a hiatus from the group in the first half of 2018 to compete as a contestant in Tencent Video's survival reality show, Produce 101 China, finishing in second place and joining the Chinese project girl group Rocket Girls 101 until June 2020. Following the disbandment of the project group, she remained on hiatus from WJSN to pursue a solo career in China until she left the group on March 3, 2023.

== Early life ==
Wu was born in Hainan, China. She joined Yuehua Entertainment, moved to South Korea around 2014 to 2015 and joined Starship Entertainment where she became a trainee.

== Career ==
=== 2015–2016: Debut with WJSN ===
On December 4, 2015, Starship Entertainment and Yuehua Entertainment introduced a 12-member Chinese-South Korean girl group WJSN. Wu was introduced as a member of "Joy Unit". Together with Wonder Unit, they released a Christmas cover of "All I Want For Christmas Is You". WJSN officially debuted in February 2016 with their mini album Would You Like? with "MoMoMo" and "Catch Me" as the two lead singles.

=== 2018–present: Debut with Rocket Girls 101, solo activities, and departure from WJSN ===
While juggling her acting and WJSN activities, Wu and bandmate, Meng Meiqi, participated in the Chinese reality survival girl group show Produce 101 aired from April 21 to June 23 on Tencent Video. Wu placed 2nd overall of 181,533,349 votes and debuted as a member of Rocket Girls 101.

On August 9, Yuehua Entertainment and Mavericks Entertainment released a joint announcement stating that they would be withdrawing Xuanyi along with Meiqi and Zining from Rocket Girls 101. Xuanyi and Meiqi are to resume their activities with WJSN. However, on August 17, both companies confirmed that after coming to an agreement with Tencent, that Xuanyi would be returning to group with Meiqi and Zining.

A month before Xuanyi came back to China for Produce 101, her teammate Cheng Xiao invited her as a guest in a travel variety show on Tencent Video, Best Friends' Perfect Vacation. The two variety shows she joined after her debut with Rocket Girls 101 are Space Challenge (on Youku Video) and "Nice to Meet You" (on Zhejiang TV). She is also the leading actress of voice movie "Future Girlfriend Lab" released in November.

On March 3, 2023, Starship Entertainment announced that Xuanyi had departed from WJSN after her contract expired.

== Discography ==
=== Extended plays ===
Title	Album details	Sales
25	Released: September 25, 2020; Label: Yuehua Entertainment; Formats: Digital download, streaming; Track listing: 1. "25"; 2. "Pink Blue Sunset" (粉蓝夕前); 3. "Betty Baby"	CHN: 239,051
Gift	Released: December 30, 2021; Label: Yuehua Entertainment; Formats: Digital download, streaming; Track listing: 1. "微光"; 2. "北卡蓝"; 3. "RSVP"	CHN: 31,252
不, 爱了	Released: May 20, 2023; Label: Yuehua Entertainment; Formats: Digital download, streaming; Track listing: 1. "向宇宙许愿"; 2. "Late in the Night"; 3. "不爱了"	CHN: 12,410

=== Singles ===
==== As lead artist ====
Title	Year	Peak chart position	Album	Sales
Title	Year	CHN (Note: The China TME UNI Chart was launched by Tencent Music in 2018 and first published by Billboard in November 2022.)	Album	Sales
"满糖宣言" (Sweet Declaration)	2019	12	立风	—N/a
"25"	2020	—	25	—N/a
"We Were In Love"	2021	—	Non-album single	CHN: 275,034
"RSVP"	2022	—	Gift	—N/a
"向宇宙许愿" (Make a Wish to the Universe)	2023	—	不, 爱了	CHN: 15,720
"江南月"	2023	—	Non-album single	—N/a
"不爱了"	2023	—	不, 爱了	—N/a
"后来风吹起"	2023	—	Non-album singles	—N/a
"种子"	2023	—	Non-album singles	—N/a
"蝴蝶恋" (Butterfly Love)	2024	—	Non-album singles	—N/a
"Sweet Hug"	2025	—	Non-album singles	—N/a
"难道说"	2025	—	Non-album singles	—N/a
"回家的小路"	2026	—	Non-album singles	—N/a
"自由的心跳"	2026	—	The Musical The Pirate Queen	—N/a
"—" denotes releases that did not chart.

==== Collaboration ====
Title	Year	Peak chart position	Album
Title	Year	CHN	Album
"偏执" (with Elvis Wang)	2020	4	歌颂

=== Promotional singles ===
Title	Year	Album	Notes
"艾草青青"	2023	Non-album singles	Special release for The Marvelous Tour of the Dragon Boat Festival 2022.
"从现在 到未来" (Now Until the Future) (with Various Artists)	2023	Non-album singles	Theme for the 2022 Asian Games.
"生活, 你好"	2023	赤梦华夏	Collaborative album to celebrate Huaxia.
"待我来"	2023	Non-album singles	
"上元花"	2026	Non-album singles	Lantern Festival special

=== Soundtrack appearances ===
Title	Year	Peak chart position	Notes
Title	Year	CHN	Notes
"福气拱拱来" (with Meng Meiqi, Duan Aojuan and Lai Meiyun)	2019	28	Boonie Bears: Blast into the Past OST
"小小鸟" (Little Bird)	2019	36	The Angry Birds Movie 2 OST
"柔骨魅兔"	2019	17	斗罗十年-龙王传说 OST
"麻辣时光"	2020	45	Run For Young OST
"星河" (Starry River)	2021	68	Douluo Continent OST
"Let's Party"	2021	43	Game for Peace OST
"VVS" (with Lexie Liu, Shan Yichun, Song Yuqi, An Qi, Lu Keran, Vava, Yamy, Chen Zhuoxuan, and Zhou Jieqiong)	2021	68	Stage Boom OST
"彩虹的微笑"	2022	—	听说很好吃2 OST
"屋顶着火" (Roof on Fire) (with Patrick Nattawat Finkler)	2022	—	听说很好吃2 OST, Cover of Victoria Song
"不期而遇"	2022	—	Ode to Joy 3 OST
"最美中国戏" (with Qiu Shi and You Zixi)	2022	—	最美中国戏 OST
"我曾陪你追过风"	2023	—	Rising With the Wind OST
"小小心愿"	2023	—	The Princess and the Werewolf OST
"自己的光" (Your Own Light)	2023	—	Be Your Own Light OST
"信仰之歌"	2023	—	Rising With the Wind OST
"红鸾"	2025	—	Perfect Match OST
"孤独人间"	2025	—	Love in Pavilion OST

== Filmography ==
=== Film ===
Year	English title	Chinese title	Role	Ref.
2018	Marna	初恋的滋味	Marna	

=== Television / Web series ===
Year	English title	Chinese title	Role	Ref.
2021	Douluo Continent	斗罗大陆	Xiao Wu	
2021	Sweet Teeth	世界微尘里	Zeng Li	
2023	The Princess and the Werewolf	郎君不如意	Qi Pa	
2023	Rising With the Wind	我要逆风去	Xiang Chaoyang	
2025	Perfect Match	五福临门	Fu Hui	
2025	Love in Pavilion	淮水竹亭	Wangquan Zui	

=== Reality shows ===
Year	English title	Chinese title	Role	Ref.
2018	Best Friends' Perfect Vacation	闺蜜的完美旅行	Cast member	
2018	Produce 101	创造101	Contestant; Finished 2nd	
2018	Space Challenge	挑战吧!太空	Cast member	
2019	Meeting You	遇见你真好	Cast member	
2019	Chase Me	追我吧	Cast member	
2020	Perfect Summer	完美的夏天	Cast member	
2020	Go Newbies	新手驾到	Cast member	
2021	Stage Boom	爆裂舞台	Contestant	
2025	Sisters Who Make Waves season 6	乘风2025	Contestant	

== Awards and nominations ==
Year	Nominated work	Award	Category	Result	Ref.
2018	—N/a	Fresh Asia Music 2018	Most Popular Female Singer	Won	
2019	—N/a	Golden Data Entertainment Awards 2018–2019	Female Artist of the Year for Variety with the Most Influence	Won	
2019	—N/a	Sina Film & TV Awards	Most Popular Variety Female Artist	Won	
