= Meng Meiqi =

Chinese singer (born 1998)

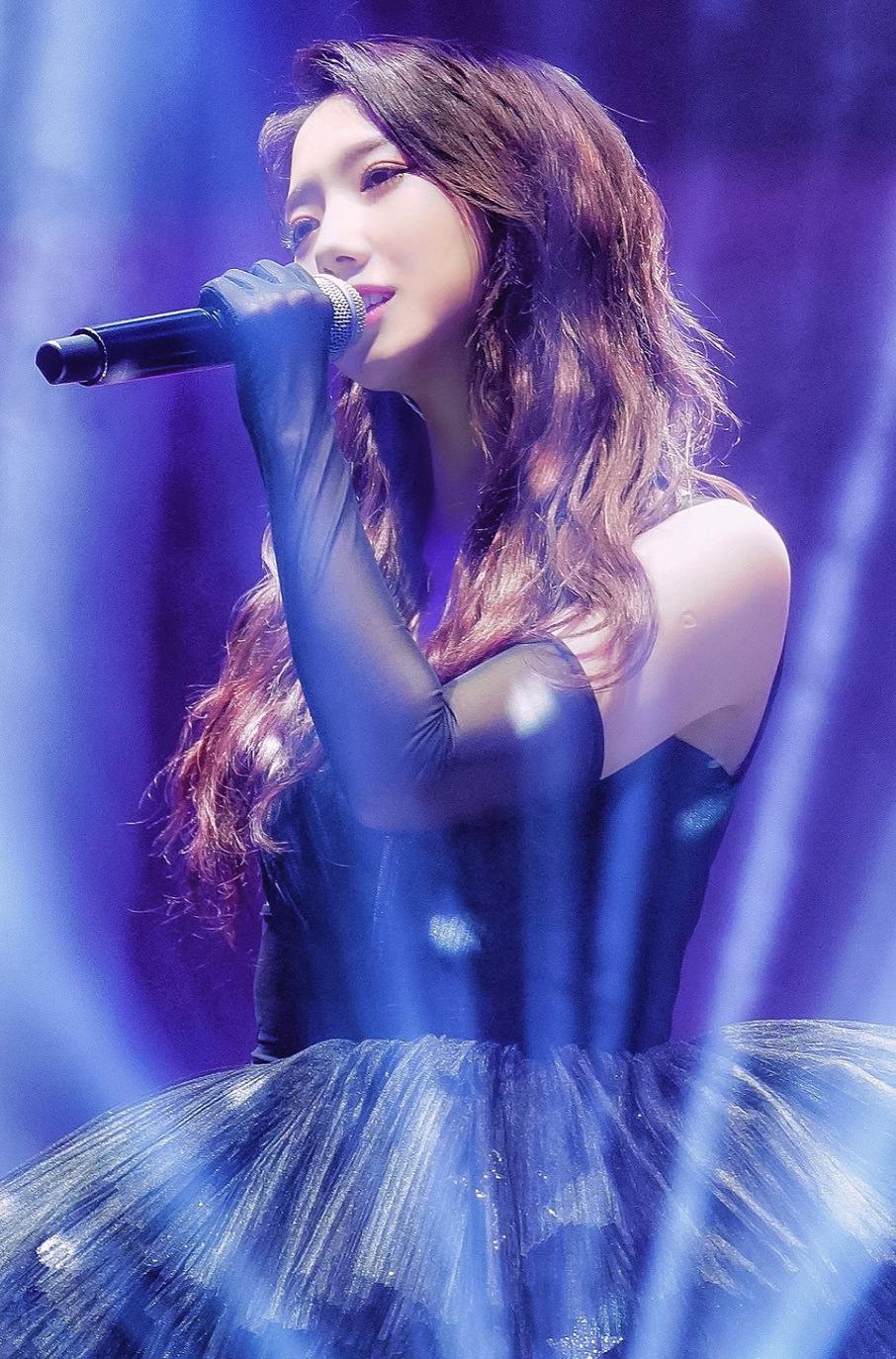
- Meng in 2019
- Born: Mèng Měiqí; October 15, 1998 (age 27); Luoyang, Henan, China
- Occupation: Singer
- Musical career
- Genres: K-pop; mandopop
- Instrument: Vocals
- Years active: 2016–present
- Labels: Starship; Yuehua; WAJIJIWA (Note: As a member of Rocket Girls 101 only.)
- Formerly of: WJSN; Rocket Girls 101; Starship Planet

Chinese name
- Chinese: 孟美岐
- Hanyu Pinyin: Mèng Měiqí

Korean name
- Hangul: 미기
- RR: Migi
- MR: Migi

Meng Meiqi (born October 15, 1998) is a Chinese singer and actress signed under Yuehua Entertainment. She began her career as a member of South Korean girl group WJSN in 2016 and went on hiatus from the group since early-2018 prior to leaving in 2023 due to the expiration of her contract. After finishing first in the Chinese edition of the survival show Produce 101, she became a member of the Chinese girl group Rocket Girls 101 in 2018.

== Early life ==
Meng was born on October 15, 1998, in Luoyang, Henan, China.

Meng studied in Luoyang Foreign Language School's Junior High department. She subsequently went to South Korea to become a trainee when she was 15 years old.

== Career ==
=== 2016–2017: Debut with WJSN and acting debut ===
In December 2015, Starship Entertainment began to release information about a girl group consisting of four units as a collaboration with Chinese entertainment company, Yuehua Entertainment. Meng, alongside the other members of the group's lineup, released a cover of "All I Want For Christmas Is You" by Mariah Carey on December 21. She debuted in WJSN on February 25, 2016, with their first mini-album, Would You Like?. On December 21, she sang the theme song of a movie, Tohoku is spoken all over the world, with Wu Xin and Ma Li.

Meng made her acting debut in 2017 in the film Autumn In My Heart. She was later cast in film Marna alongside WJSN member Wu Xuanyi, Nine Percent and NEX7 member Zhu Zhengting, and UNIQ member Zhou Yixuan.

=== 2018: Produce 101, debut and Rocket Girls controversy ===
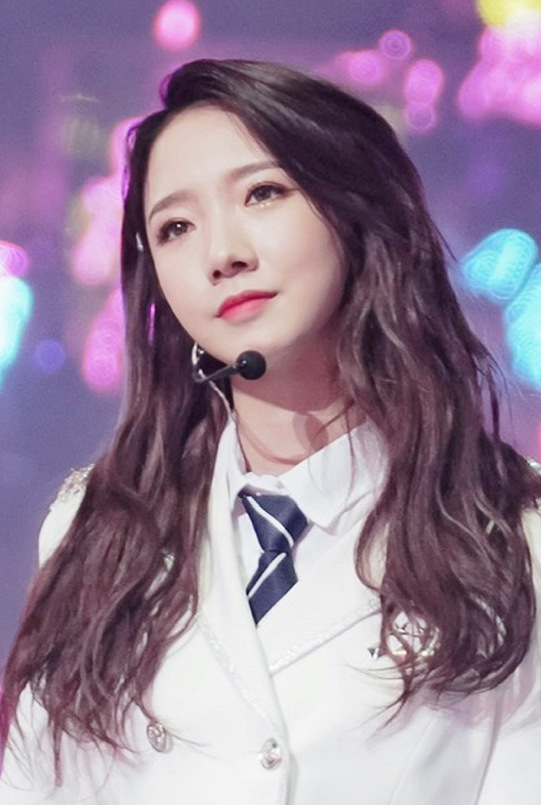
Meng Meiqi during a performance with Rocket Girls 101 in Beijing, 2019

Due to their participation on the show, they withdrew from the remaining promotions for WJSN's fourth mini album Dream Your Dream. Both Meng and Wu made it into the final line-up of girl group Rocket Girls on June 23, 2018. She ranked first with over 185 million votes, debuting as the "Center" for Rocket Girls. However, due to the group's two year contracts with Tencent, it was rumored that Meng and Wu would not be participating in any activities in South Korea with WJSN. Starship Entertainment then stated otherwise, and confirmed that they would be promoting with both WJSN and Rocket Girls.

On August 9, 2018, Yuehua Entertainment and Mavericks Entertainment released a joint announcement stating that they would be withdrawing Meng along with Wu and Zhang Zining from Rocket Girls. Meng and Wu were to resume their activities with WJSN. However, on August 17, both companies confirmed that after coming to an agreement with Tencent, that Meng Meiqi would be returning to Rocket Girls with Wu Xuanyi and Zhang Zining.

=== 2019–present: Solo debut, and departure from WJSN ===
On January 15, 2019, Meng released her first promotional track titled "有种 (Helios)" for the movie, The Wandering Earth. Later in the year, she also released her first extended play, 犟 (Jiang), on April 23, 2019, with a lead single under the same title. Within the first twenty minutes of the album's release, it became the fastest selling digital album on QQ Music in 2019 with over 1 million digital sales.

Meng also appeared in the spin-off film of the Step Up franchise, Step Up: Year of the Dance, as the first lead actress. She was also cast as one of the leading actresses for the fantasy film, Jade Dynasty, which was an adaptation from the xianxia novel, Zhu Xian. The movie premiered on September 12.

On October 30, 2020, Meng released a lead single "Mute" for her second EP "Love Not Love (爱·不爱)". The MV for "Mute" was released on November 26, 2020. The second song from the album "Miss You" was released on November 28, 2020, and the last song "Quit" on December 26, 2020.

Meng Meiqi's third EP "岐义双瞳" was released on October 15, 2021.

On November 7, 2022, Meng released her fourth EP 空白频率 (White Frequency). Meng accompanied the release with a dance music video for the EP's lead single, "Alien".

On March 3, 2023, Starship Entertainment announced that Meng had departed from WJSN after her contract expired.

== Discography ==
=== Extended plays ===
Title	Album details	Sales
Jiang (犟)	Released: April 23, 2019; Label: WAJIJIWA Entertainment, Tencent; Formats: Digital download, streaming; Track listing: 1. Jiang (犟); 2. Unfamiliar Girl (陌生的女孩)	CHN: 2,437,159
Love Not Love (爱·不爱)	Released: October 30, 2020; Label: Yuehua Entertainment; Formats: Digital download, streaming; Track listing: 1. Mute; 2. Miss You; 3. Quit	CHN: 1,805,948
岐义双瞳 (Qi Yi Double Pupil)	Released: October 15, 2021; Label: Yuehua Entertainment; Formats: Digital download, streaming; Track listing: 1. 判 2. 醒 3. 重塑; 4. 无声的情书	—N/a
空白频率 (White Frequency)	Released: November 7, 2022; Label: Yuehua Entertainment; Formats: Digital download, streaming; Track listing: 1. Flyer; 2. Alien; 3. 少啰嗦; 4. Flyer (Instrumental); 5. Alien (Instrumental); 6. 少啰嗦 (Instrumental)	CHN: 102,359

=== Singles ===
Title	Year	Peak chart position	Album
Title	Year	CHN (Note: The Billboard China Top 100 was launched in January 2019 by Billboard China. The chart is no longer active.)	Album
As Lead Artist
"Helios" (有种)	2019	6	The Wandering Earth OST
"Jiang" (犟)	2019	—	Jiang (犟)
"Only You Know" (只有你知道)	2019	—	The Wind (立风)
"I Like You"	2019	42	2019 Hyun Dance Summer Music Season Theme Song
"MUTE"	2020	N/A	Love Not Love (爱·不爱)
"判 (Suffering)"	2021	N/A	岐义双瞳
"Alien"	2022	N/A	空白频率 (White Frequency)
"心飞扬"	2022	N/A	Breaking Through OST
Collaborations
"毒液前來" (with Yang Chaoyue, Duan Aojuan, Yamy and Sunnee)	2018	—	Venom OST
"福气拱拱来" (with Wu Xuanyi, Duan Aojuan and Lai Meiyun)	2019	35	Boonie Bears: Blast into the Past OST
"Don't Wait Any More" (with Justin of NEX7)	2019	—	Step Up: Year of the Dance OST
"C" (with Zhou Zhennan of R1SE)	2020	—	Special Collaboration
"—" denotes releases that did not chart or were not released in that region.

== Filmography ==
=== Film ===
Year	English title	Chinese title	Role	Notes	Ref.
2018	Marna	初恋的滋味	Ying Tao	Supporting role	
2019	Autumn In My Heart	蓝色生死恋	Xin Ai	Second lead role	
2019	Jade Dynasty	诛仙	Bi Yao	Second lead role	
2019	Step Up: Year of the Dance	舞出我人生之舞所不能	Xiao Fei	Lead role	
2022	Breaking Through	我心飞扬	TBC	Lead role	
2023	Summer With You	车晓宇	Che Xiaoyu	Lead role	

=== Television shows ===
Year	Title	Network	Notes
2016	Would You Like Girls	Mnet	
2017	Outrageous Roommates	MBC	
2017	WJSN TV	JTBC	
2018	Korea MBC idol star games	MBC	
2018	Produce 101	Tencent Video	Contestant; Finished 1st
2019	The Coming One 3	Tencent Video	Judge
2020	Masked Dancing King	Youku	Winner
2021	Produce Camp 2021	Tencent Video	Senior
2021	Born To Dance	iQIYI	Judge
2022	Wonderland Junior	Tencent Video	Main Cast Member
2023	The Next 2023	Tencent Video	Contestant
