= Super Penguin League =

2018 Chinese variety show

- Promotional poster
- Also known as: Super3 Star Arena; Super Penguin Alliance
- Simplified Chinese: 超级企鹅联盟
- Genre: Basketball; Reality show; Sports
- Starring: Kris Wu; Dylan Wang; Bai Jingting; Ren Jialun; Hou Minghao; Deng Lun; Li Chen; Wang Anyu; Li Wenhan; Sunnee; Lai Mei Yun
- Country of origin: China
- Original language: Mandarin Chinese
- No. of seasons: 3
- No. of episodes: 30

Production
- Production location: China
- Running time: 110 minutes
- Production company: Tencent Video

Original release
- Network: Tencent Video; Tencent Esports; WeTV
- Release: 2 August 2018 – 7 November 2020

Super Penguin League (Chinese: 超级企鹅联盟) is a 2018 Chinese live competitive basketball all-star tournament featuring both sports and entertainment celebrities, including former NBA legend Tracy McGrady, Iverson Molinar, Steve Nash, Manu Ginóbili and Tony Parker, noted trainer Ganon Baker, CBA Zhejiang Lions head coach Li Chunjiang, and former Taiwanese international Yen Hsing Su. On 2 August 2018, it was released on Tencent Video. More than 50 prominent personalities from the sports and entertainment industries convened for a 'Sports vs. Entertainment' event held at the Shanghai Oriental Sports Centre.

== Plot ==
Super Penguin League is a Chinese All-Star basketball tournament where celebrities undergo training to compete against NBA and CBA players. In this edition, the 'Ultimate Red' and 'Blue Battle' teams competed against each other in a competitive match. Throughout the game, freestyle basketball and professional cheerleading performances were presented, contributing to the overall dynamic atmosphere. The event combined sports and entertainment, enhancing fan engagement. Rocket Girls 101 were official cheerleaders, and BonBon Girls 303 gave an opening performance.

The rules, officiating, statistics, and commentary all adhered to NBA standards. The event featured world-class referees, and a commentary team that delivered a level of quality comparable to the NBA Finals.

== Program format ==
Super Penguin League represents a significant upgrade from the Red and Blue War, evolving from a one-off celebrity game into a full-season competition featuring group stages, knockouts, and finals. Sixteen teams—split evenly between the Red Force and Blue Energy alliances, compete for advancement. Each team comprises a captain, two stars, and a professional player, blending entertainment and athleticism while upholding high basketball standards.

- Season 1: The competition lasted 40 days and featured 24 high-level matches. The 'Gathering Stars' segment was led by Tracy McGrady, Kris Wu and Yen Hsing Su.
- Season 2: Recognised basketball trainer Ganon Baker, NBA players Manu Ginóbili and Tony Parker along with coach Li Chunjiang, provided professional guidance, intensive training, and detailed game plans for the players.
- Season 3: It consisted of three teams: Dark Ranger, Barbie Bear and Y.C Lakers.

== Seasons ==
Season	Episodes	Originally aired	
Season	Episodes	Premiere	Finale
Season 1	13	2 August 2018	14 October 2018
Season 2	9	2 July 2019	21 September 2019
Season 3	8	17 September 2020	7 November 2020

== Members ==
Year	Season	Members	Coach
2018	Season 1	Kris Wu; Dylan Wang; Bai Jingting; Ren Jialun; Hou Minghao; Deng Lun; Elvis Han; Wang Zi Rui; Wu Haochen; Wu Chun; Allen Ai	NBA: Tracy McGrady; Iverson Molinar; Steve Nash Coach: Yen Hsing Su
2019	Season 2	Li Chen; Zheng Kai; Jam Hsiao; Aaron Yan; Dylan Wang; Lai Kuan-lin; Gao Hanyu; Dong Youlin; Tang Xiaotian; Zhang Sifan; Liu Ruilin; Ayanga; Zheng Yunlong; Li Mincheng; Bruce Hung; Jason Gu; Wen Yifan; Aaron Deng; Zhang Mingen; Yu Haoran; Man Shuke; Chi Zi; Will Liu; Zhang He; Zhou Rui; Wang Qing; Lang Dongzhe	NBA: Manu Ginóbili; Tony Parker Coach: Li Chunjiang; Ganon Baker; Managers: Sunnee; Lai Mei Yun
2020	Season 3	Wang Anyu; Li Wenhan; Ashton Chen; Sun Yi; Li Yunrui; Zhang Yuan; Li Jia Xiang; Ele Yan; Li Chen; Rex Li; Pinkray; Wang Runze; Dylan Wang; Gong Ziqi; Lang Dongzhe	CBA: Chen Dengxing; Yang Zheng; Li Hexu; Zhang Jianhao Managers: Zhang Doudou; Naomi Wang; Miya Muqi

== Reception ==
The dynamics of professional basketball, combined with the creative athleticism and talent of young national artists, offered a refreshing experience that received critical and audience acclaim. In 2019, singer Jam Hsiao, Ma Jia, and actor Bruce Hung provided entertainment during the competition; the final game garnered over 21 Million viewers on streaming platforms.

== Production ==
According to Zhao Guochen, General Manager of Sports Operations at Tencent, the Super Penguin League was launched to seize the opportunity for professional entertainment sports tournaments and offer a more refined version to existing celebrity events.

On 6 June 2018, Tencent Esports launched the Super Penguin League in Beijing, evolving the celebrity game into a full season league. On 22 August 2018, Tencent officially announced that Rocket Girls 101 would join the show, performing as halftime cheerleaders throughout the event.
