= Lai Meiyun =

Chinese singer (born 1998)

- 赖美云 Lài Měiyǘn
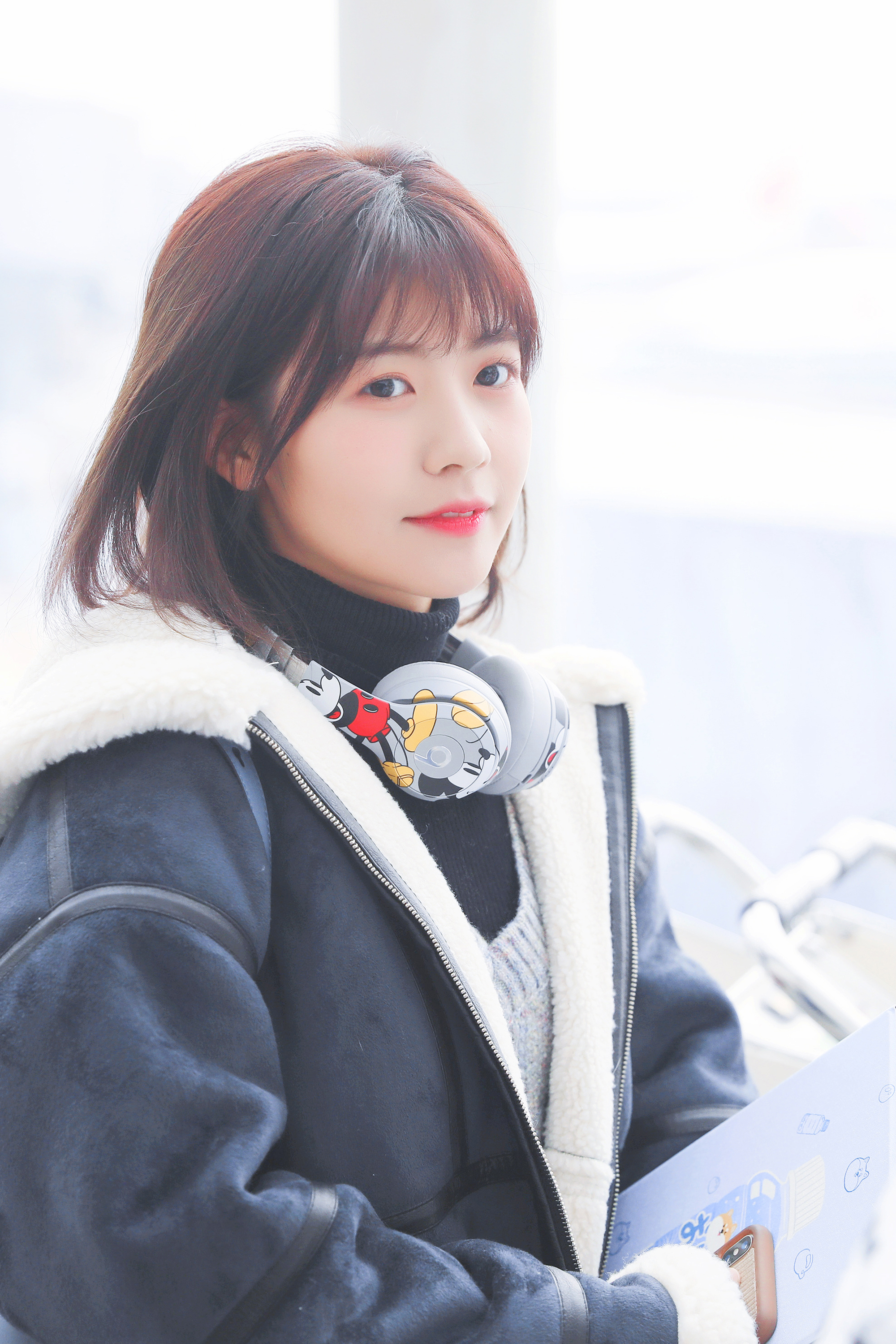
- Lai Meiyun was at Guangzhou Baiyun Airport on December 29, 2018.
- Born: July 7, 1998 (age 28); Shenzhen, Guangdong, China
- Occupations: Singer; Actress
- Years active: 2014–present
- Musical career
- Also known as: 小七; Xiao Qi; Sunny
- Genres: C-pop; Mandopop
- Label: Qigu Culture
- Formerly of: S.I.N.G; Rocket Girls 101

Lai Meiyun
- Traditional Chinese: 賴美雲
- Simplified Chinese: 赖美云
Transcriptions
Standard Mandarin
- Hanyu Pinyin: Lài Měiyún
- Wade–Giles: lai mei-yün

Lai Meiyun (Chinese: 赖美云; born 7 July 1998) is a Chinese singer signed under Qigu Culture. She was a member of Rocket Girls 101 after ranking 6th in the survival show Produce 101. She was also a member of S.I.N.G as the main vocal and center under Qigu Culture.

== Early life and education ==
Lai Meiyun was born in a single parent family in Shenzhen, Guangdong, and was raised by her mother.

Meiyun has studied in Shenzhen High School from 2013 to 2016. During this period, Meiyun joined the Lily Choir of Shenzhen Senior High School with 1st place, where she laid the foundation for becoming a singer in days to come.

Meiyun has participated the audition of Chinese girl idol group SNH48 for 3 times but didn't make the cut.

== Career ==
=== Pre-debut: SING Idol Group Competition ===
In October 2014, Meiyun auditioned for a position in S.I.N.G and was accepted as a trainee after ranking in the top 10. On December 13, Meiyun began a half-year professional training course on physique, vocal and dance with the group.

=== 2015–2017: Debut and Promotion of Songs ===
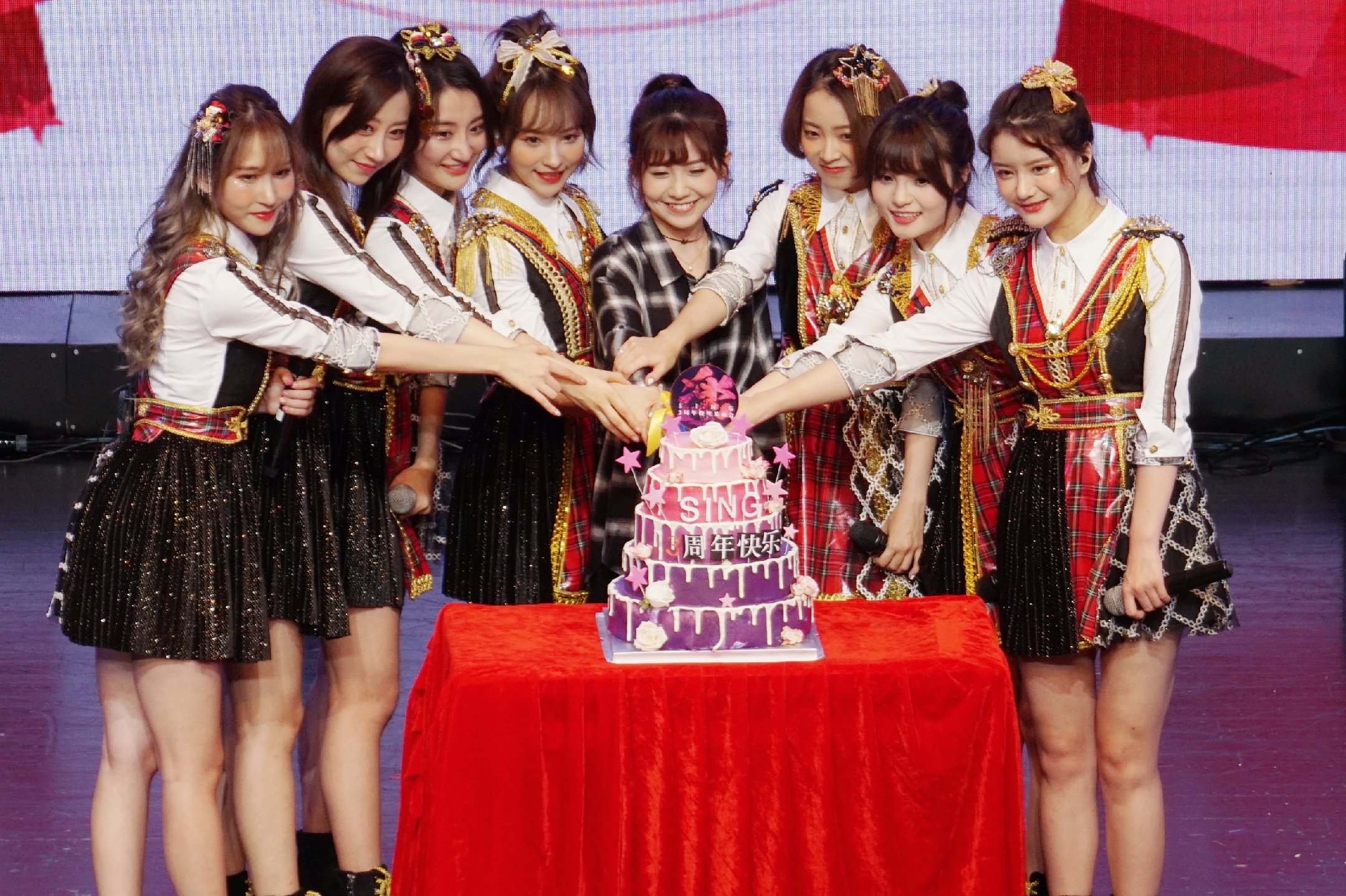
Lai Meiyun (middle) during S.I.N.G 3rd anniversary celebration on Aug 27, 2018

On August 10, 2015, Meiyun debuted as part of S.I.N.G with the single "青春的告白". On August 10, 2015, Lai Meiyun released the first single "The Confessions of Youth" with the combination, and officially debuted; on November 11, 2015, the third single "Bulu Bulu" was released with the combination; On December 16, 2015, Meiyun released the Christmas-themed single "灵儿想叮当 Linger wants to be a jingle" and song MV with S.I.N.G.

On January 9, 2016, she participated in the first annual Star Awards Ceremony(繁星年度颁奖盛典) with the group and won the annual Pioneer Newcomer Award. On March 28, 2016, she won The hottest ring tone of second Cool music Asian Festival Cool Music Popularity List. On June 17, 2016, she released the graduation season single "繁星 Stars" with the group. In July 2016, She released the first digital music album "致青春" with the group. This album includes a total of 8 singles including "青春的告白" and "偷偷喜欢你". In the same year, Meiyun also released several new singles with the group.

=== 2018–2020: Produce 101 and Rocket Girls 101 ===
Meiyun participated in Produce 101 as a trainee, representing Qigu Culture. She then emerged 6th in the final rankings and debuted with members from other companies to form Rocket Girls 101 on June 23, 2018. On July 24, with the Rocket Girl 101 released the song "卡路里"("Calories") for the film "Hello Mr. Billionaire"; On August 18, with the Rocket Girl 101 released the first EP "Bump"; On December 31, with the Rocket Girl 101 to participate in the Hunan Television New Year's concert.

On January 12, 2019, with the Rocket Girl 101 held "2019 Rocket Girl 101 Flying Concert" in Shanghai; On July 12, released the first individual Single "It's Raining"("下雨了"), which is included in the Rocket Girl 101 newly released album "立风". On November 22, released her second Single "Not Tiny"("不渺小"), which is an award for her 2nd sales contribution to Rocket Girl 101's second album "立风".

On June 23, 2020, Meiyun graduated from Rocket Girls 101.

=== 2020–present: solo career ===
On June 24, 2020, just after graduation from Rocket Girls 101, Meiyun's personal studio was founded and released her first Single as a solo artist, "Girls and Crown" ("女孩与王冠"), Meiyun begins her solo career. On July 28, released her single "Wait" ("等等") as the theme song of TV show Forget Me Not Café (忘不了餐厅) series 2. On July 31, released "Every Time" ("每一次") as the theme song of animated series "Fox Spirit Matchmaker" ("狐妖小红娘·金晨曦篇"). On August 3, released "Wild Girl" ("野生姑娘") as the theme song of "Psychic Princess" ("通灵妃") series 2.

== Discography ==
=== Promotional singles ===
Title	Year	Peak chart positions	Album
Title	Year	Billboard	Album
As lead artist
"下雨了 (It's raining)"	2019	—	"立风"
"不渺小 (Not Tiny)"	2019	—	—
"女孩与王冠 (Girl and Crown)"	2020	—	—
"等等 (Wait)"	2020	—	the theme song of "忘不了餐厅" ("Forget Me Not Café")
"每一次 (Every Time)"	2020	—	the theme song of "狐妖小红娘·金晨曦篇" ("Fox Spirit Matchmaker")
"野生姑娘 (Wild Girl)"	2020	—	the theme song of "通灵妃" ("Psychic Princess")
Collaborations
"Never Stand Still" (with Yang Chaoyue and Xu Mengjie)	2019	—	Side by Side OST
"福气拱拱来" (with Meng Meiqi, Wu Xuanyi and Duan Aojuan)	2019	35	Boonie Bears: Blast into the Past OST
"—" denotes releases that did not chart or were not released in that region.

== Filmography ==
=== Television Dramas ===
Year	English title	Chinese title	Role	Notes
2018	Happy Q-bot 3	快乐酷宝3	奈奈(Nai Nai)	Support Role
2019	Side by Side	极限17：羽你同行	小羽(Xiaoyu)	Support Role
2021	My Queen	我的女主别太萌	江萌萌(Jiang mengmeng)	Female Lead

=== Variety shows ===
Year	Title	Network	Notes
2016	Wild Things	Shenzhen TV	
2016	Born 05	iQiyi	
2018	Produce 101	Tencent Video	Contestant; Finished 6th
2019	Super Penguin League; Season:2 超级企鹅联盟 Super3	Tencent Video	Appearing as basketball Manager

=== Films ===
Year	Title	Notes
2017	Our Shining Days "闪光少女"	As S.I.N.G Member

== See also ==
- Super Impassioned Net Generation
