= Rocket Girls 101 =

Chinese girl group

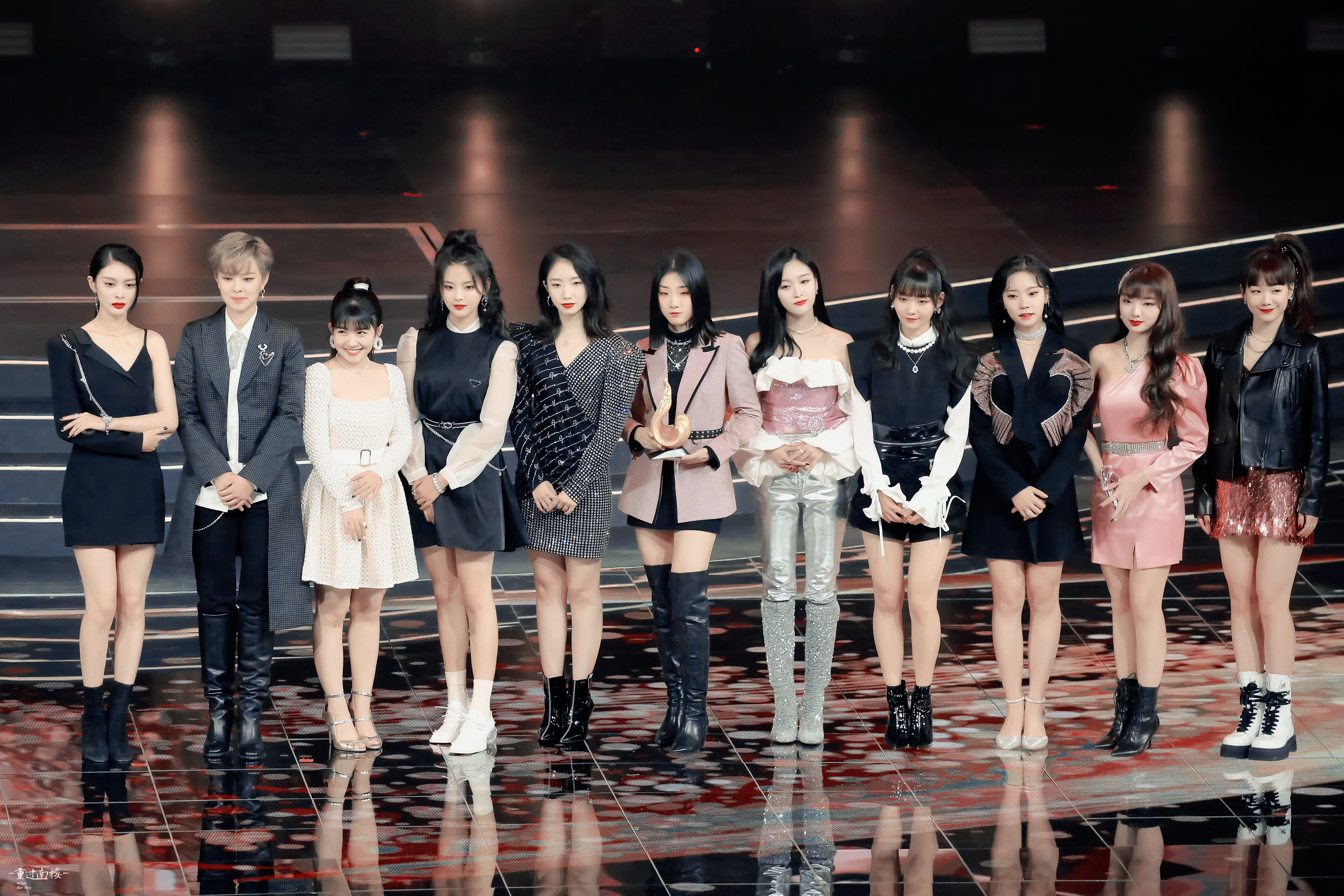
- Rocket Girls 101 in January 2020; From left to right: Fu Jing, Sunnee, Lai Meiyun, Yang Chaoyue, Meng Meiqi, Yamy, Wu Xuanyi, Duan Aojuan, Zhang Zining, Li Ziting, and Xu Mengjie

Background information
- Origin: Beijing, China
- Genre: C-pop
- Years active: 2018–2020
- Labels: Wajijiwa; Sony Music; Tencent Penguin Pictures
- Past members: Yamy; Xu Mengjie; Wu Xuanyi; Fu Jing; Zhang Zining; Sunnee; Lai Meiyun; Yang Chaoyue; Meng Meiqi; Li Ziting; Duan Aojuan

Rocket Girls 101 (Chinese: 火箭少女101; pinyin: huǒ jiàn shào nǚ 101) was a Chinese idol girl group formed by Tencent through the 2018 reality show Produce 101 China on Tencent Video. The project girl group consists of eleven members that came from different companies: Meng Meiqi, Wu Xuanyi, Yang Chaoyue, Duan Aojuan, Yamy, Lai Meiyun, Zhang Zining, Sunnee, Li Ziting, Fu Jing and Xu Mengjie. They made their debut on June 23, 2018, with the single song "Rocket Girls".

As their time as a girl group was limited to only 2 years, they disbanded on June 23, 2020, and returned to their respective agencies.

== History ==
=== Pre-debut: Produce 101 ===
The members participated as trainees in the show Produce 101 before debuting as members of Rocket Girls 101 on June 23. The group includes two Cosmic Girls members, Meng Meiqi and Wu Xuanyi, both from Yuehua. They placed 1st and 2nd respectively. Yang Chaoyue (Wenlan Culture) and Duan Aojuan (Long Wu Tian Culture) placed 3rd and 4th. Former The Rap of China contestant, Yamy (JC Universe Entertainment), placed 5th. Lai Meiyun (Qigu Culture), Zhang Zining (Mavericks Entertainment), Sunnee (K-L Entertainment), Li Ziting (Huaying Yixing), Fu Jing (Banana Entertainment) and Xu Mengjie (Zimei Tao Culture) placed 6th, 7th, 8th, 9th, 10th, and 11th respectively.

=== 2018–2020: Debut, contract controversy, Collide, The Wind, and Meeting · Goodbye ===
On June 23, 2018, they released the song "Rocket Girls". They made their first official TV appearance on "Happy China Graduation Music Concert 2018", which aired on Hunan Television the day after their debut. On August 9, two days before the group's official single release and press conference, Yuehua Entertainment and Mavericks Entertainment released a joint announcement stating that they would be withdrawing members Meiqi, Xuanyi, and Zhining from the group. The announcement also stated that Yuehua decided to withdraw Meiqi and Xuanyi due to the inability to come to an agreement with the company managing Rocket Girls 101 regarding their concurrent promotion with the group and Cosmic Girls, and that Mavericks Entertainment withdrew Zining due to health issues.

However, on August 17, Yuehua and Mavericks both announced that the members would be returning to the group after coming to an agreement with Tencent, and stated that Rocket Girls 101's promotion would take priority over all members' original groups, unless agreements are reached.

On August 18, they released their first EP, Collide (撞). On September 15, the group performed the halftime show at Super Penguin League.

On June 23, 2019, they released their first studio album, The Wind (立风), Shingu Ryohei is the director of the music video. The group then was announced to perform at the NBA halftime show later in the same year.

In early 2020, they released a new single named "Be Happy" (要嗨森) to celebrate the Chinese New Year.

On May 25, 2020, they released their second and final EP, Meeting·Goodbye (遇见•再见).

On June 23, 2020, their contracts expired and the group disbanded making the 11 members officially graduated from the group after the formation.

== Members ==
- Meng Meiqi (孟美岐)
- Wu Xuanyi (吴宣仪)
- Yang Chaoyue (杨超越)
- Duan Aojuan (段奥娟)
- Yamy (郭颖)
- Lai Meiyun (赖美云)
- Zhang Zining (张紫宁)
- Sunnee (杨芸晴)
- Li Ziting (李紫婷)
- Fu Jing (傅菁)
- Xu Mengjie (徐梦洁)

== Discography ==
=== Studio albums ===
Title	Album details	Sales
The Wind (立风)	Released: June 23, 2019; Label: Wajijiwa Entertainment, Tencent; Formats: Digital download, streaming; Track listing: 1. 风 (Wind); 2. 只有你知道 (Only You Know); 3. 满糖宣言 (Full Sugar Declaration); 4. O.O; 5. 是吧18 (Right18); 6. Flying Girl; 7. 下雨了 (It's Raining); 8. 自己 (Myself); 9. 那个我 (That's Me); 10. 行动家 (Activist); 11. 阿丽塔 (Alita); 12. 造一架飞机 (Make an Airplane); 13. 飒小姐 (Extraordinary Girl)	CHN: 737,179

=== Extended plays ===
Title	Album details	Sales
Collide (撞)	Released: August 18, 2018; Label: Wajijiwa Entertainment, Tencent; Formats: Digital download, streaming; Track listing: 1. 撞 (Collide); 2. Light; 3. 月亮警察 (Sailor Moon); 4. 生而为赢 (Born To Win)	CHN: 2,271,426
Meeting·Goodbye (遇见•再见)	Released: May 25, 2020; Label: Wajijiwa Entertainment, Tencent; Formats: Digital download, streaming; Track listing: 1. 11次心跳 (11 Times Heartbeat); 2. 嘘！我跟你讲 (Shh! You Say To Me); 3. 硬糖 (Our Shining Time); 4. 5452830	—N/a

=== Singles ===
Title	Year	Peak chart positions	Album
Title	Year	CHN	Album
"Rocket Girls"	2018	—	Non-album single
"Collide" (撞)	2018	6	Collide (撞)
"Light"	2018	7	Collide (撞)
"Sailor Moon" (月亮警察)	2018	—	Collide (撞)
"Born to Win" (生而为赢)	2018	—	Collide (撞)
"Wind" (风)	2019	4	The Wind (立风)
"Hard Candy"	2020	—	Meeting·Goodbye (遇见•再见)

=== Promotional singles ===
Title	Year	Peak chart positions	Album
Title	Year	CHN	Album
"101 Wishes" (101个愿望) (Note: Credited as Rocket Girls 101 but only features Yang Chaoyue, Lai Meiyun, and Fu Jing)	2018	—	Non-album singles
"Rocket Boom" (榮譽星球)	2019	41	Non-album singles

=== Soundtrack appearances ===
Title	Year	Peak chart positions	Album
Title	Year	CHN	Album
"Calorie" (卡路里)	2018	4	Hello Mr. Billionaire OST
"Venom is Coming" (毒液前來) (Note: Credited as Rocket Girls 101 but only features Meng Meiqi, Yang Chaoyue, Duan Aojuan, Yamy, and Sunnee)	2018	—	Venom promo single
"Rampage to the Next Stop" (横冲直撞下一站)	2019	—	Rampage 20 Opening Theme Song
"Blessing Arch" (福气拱拱来) (Note: Credited as Rocket Girls 101 but only features Meng Meiqi, Wu Xuanyi, Duan Aojuan, and Lai Meiyun)	2019	35	Boonie Bears: Blast into the Past OST
"Galaxy Disco" (银河系Disco)	2019	—	Crazy Alien OST
"On Fire"	2020	—	PlayerUnknown's Battlegrounds Promotional Single

== Filmography ==
=== Reality Shows ===
Year	Title	Network	Notes	Ref.
2018	Produce 101	Tencent Video	Contestants	
2018	Rocket Girls 101 Research Institute	Tencent Video	Cast members	
2018	Super Penguin League	Tencent Video	Contestants	
2019	Super Penguin League Season 2	Tencent Video	Contestants	
2019	Rampage 20	Tencent Video	Cast members	
2020	Rampaging 20s Season 2	Tencent Video	Cast members	
2020	We Are Blazing	Tencent Video	Contestants	

== Awards and nominations ==
Year	Nominated work	Award	Category	Result	Ref.
2018	Rocket Girls 101	Freshasia Music Awards	Most Popular Newcomer	Won	
2018	Rocket Girls 101	2018 Global Chinese Music Awards	Most Popular Group	Won	
2018	Rocket Girls 101	Tencent Starlight Awards 2018	Best Group Of The Year	Won	
2018	"Light"	Tencent Starlight Awards 2018	Most Popular Music Video Of the Year	Won	
