= Produce 101 China =

2018 Chinese reality television show

- Promotional Poster

Chinese name
- Simplified Chinese: 创造101
- Traditional Chinese: 創造101
- Hanyu Pinyin: Chuàngzào Yīlíngyī
- Genre: Reality, Survival Competition
- Created by: CJ E&M
- Developed by: Tencent
- Presented by: Huang Zitao
- Starring: Huang Zitao; Tiger Hu; Jason Zhang; Ella Chen; Show Lo; Wang Yibo
- Judges: "Citizen Producers" (Viewers)
- Announcer: 何雁南 (pinyin: Hé Yànnán)
- Theme music composer: Tiger Hu, Nick Pyo
- Ending theme: 《创造101》
- Country of origin: China
- Original languages: Chinese; Mandarin
- No. of episodes: 10

Production
- Production locations: Hangzhou, Zhejiang
- Camera setup: Multi-camera
- Running time: 113–196 minutes; 252 minutes (finale)
- Production companies: 7-D Vision; CJ E&M; Tencent Penguin Pictures

Original release
- Network: Tencent Video
- Release: April 21 – June 23, 2018

Related
- Produce 101; Produce Camp 2019; Produce Camp 2020; Produce Camp 2021; Produce Camp Asia: Thailand

Produce 101 (Chinese: 《创造101》; pinyin: Chuàngzào Yīlíngyī) is a Chinese reality show, which premiered on Tencent Video and based on the South Korean franchise show of the same name. It premiered on April 21, 2018 and aimed to form an eleven-member girl group.

The series was jointly produced by 7-D Vision and Tencent Penguin Pictures, under license from Mnet's owner CJ E&M. The show attracted more than 4.3 billion views on Tencent Video.

== Background ==
Since the success of Super Girl in China, no other show had sparked audience interest to the same degree. While the show launched the careers of many talented solo vocalists there has been a lack of girl groups in the Chinese-speaking world. The biggest girl group in the early 2000s was S.H.E and since then, there has been a lack of well-known girl groups that have reached the same success.

The show aims to create a brand new "it" girl group that represents modern women and appeals to all genders for the new generation.

Unlike the original Korean version, Produce 101 China has a number of different rules and challenges introduced beginning in episode 2. One such example is the inclusion of "knock-out" challengers who can take the place of a 101 member in the original "auditions" based on mentors discretion of the challengers' skills in comparison to the original trainees. In the first elimination, certain members who had highest votes could also choose to save a member who was up for elimination as a second chance "intern".

== Mentors ==
Name	Age (then)	Role	Notes
Tao	25	Nation's Producer	Former member of Exo
Tiger Hu	34	Songwriting/Composition instructor	
Jason Zhang	35	Vocal instructor	
Ella Chen	36	Vocal instructor	Member of S.H.E
Show Lo	38	Dance instructor	
Wang Yibo	20	Dance instructor	Member of UNIQ

== Contestants ==
Color key

Left the show
Eliminated in the 2nd episode
Top 11 of the week
Contestants saved from elimination
Eliminated in 1st elimination
Eliminated in 2nd elimination
Eliminated in 3rd elimination
Eliminated in 4th elimination
Final debuting members

Company	Name	Age	Grade					Ranking								
Company	Name	Age	1	2	3	4	5	E02	E03	E04	E05	E06	E07	E08	E09	E10
Banana Entertainment (香蕉娱乐)	Qiang Dongyue (Note: Former contestant on Super Girl 2016 (Chinese: 《超级女声》; pinyin: Chāojí Nǚshēng)) (Note: Former contestant on The Rap of China (season 1) (Chinese: 《中国有嘻哈》; pinyin: Zhōngguó Yǒu Xīhā) (June–September 2017)) (Note: Member of Chinese pre-debut girl group Trainee18) (强东玥)	24	A → B	B	A	A	B	2	5	5	7	10	10	17	20	21
Banana Entertainment (香蕉娱乐)	Fu Jing (傅菁)	23	B	A	A	A	B	8	8	10	9	9	9	12	12	10
Banana Entertainment (香蕉娱乐)	Wang Yiran (王亦然)		B	B	Eliminated			81	83	83	Eliminated					
Banana Entertainment (香蕉娱乐)	Liu Niyi (刘尼夷)		C	C	Eliminated			77	85	88	Eliminated					
Banana Entertainment (香蕉娱乐)	Wang Manjun (王曼君)		C	D	Eliminated			96	96	96	Eliminated					
Yuehua Entertainment (乐华娱乐)	Meng Meiqi (Note: Member of Korean girl group WJSN/Cosmic Girls) (孟美岐)	20	A	A	A	A	A	16	6	4	1	1	1	1	1	1
Yuehua Entertainment (乐华娱乐)	Wu Xuanyi (吴宣仪)	24	A → B	A	A	A	A	5	1	1	2	3	3	3	3	2
Yuehua Entertainment (乐华娱乐)	Mena Shao XiMengNa (邵西蒙娜)		B	B	C	Eliminated		52	69	40	51	51	52	Eliminated		
Yuehua Entertainment (乐华娱乐)	Jiang Jinger (江璟儿)		C	B	D	Eliminated		40	40	52	41	46	47	Eliminated		
Yuehua Entertainment (乐华娱乐)	Zhang Xi (张溪)		B	B	D	Eliminated		42	43	42	48	50	51	Eliminated		
Yuehua Entertainment (乐华娱乐)	Pan Junya (潘珺雅)		C	C	Eliminated			63	72	76	Eliminated					
Yuehua Entertainment (乐华娱乐)	Yang Ruihan (杨蕊菡)		C	B	Eliminated			83	79	68	Eliminated					
Mavericks Entertainment (麦锐娱乐)	Zhang Zining (Note: Member of Chinese girl group Mera) (张紫宁)	22	A	A	B	A	A	47	23	18	5	5	7	10	8	7
Mavericks Entertainment (麦锐娱乐)	Blair Wang Yue (王玥)		C	D	Eliminated			51	60	74	Eliminated					
Mavericks Entertainment (麦锐娱乐)	Zhang Ruimeng (张芮萌)		D	F	Eliminated			29	61	79	Eliminated					
OACA (觉醒东方)	Li Zixuan (Note: Former contestant on Girls Fighting (Chinese: 《加油！美少女》; pinyin: Jiāyóu! Měi Shàonǚ; lit. 'Come On! Beautiful Girl') (June–August 2016)) (李子璇)		B	A	A	B	B	12	10	9	10	13	13	23	17	12
OACA (觉醒东方)	Lin Junyi (林君怡)		A	B	Eliminated			46	56	71	Eliminated					
OACA (觉醒东方)	Ni Qiuyun (倪秋云)		B	C	Eliminated			65	58	67	Eliminated					
Super Jet Entertainment (捷特联合)	Zhu Tiantian (朱天天)		B	F	C	Eliminated		90	88	35	45	40	38	Eliminated		
Super Jet Entertainment (捷特联合)	Liu Dexi (刘德熙)		B	C	D	Eliminated		37	74	53	57	53	46	Eliminated		
Emperor Entertainment Group (英皇娱乐)	Angela Hui / Xu Jingyun (许靖韵)		A	C	D	C	B	32	36	54	23	28	31	20	22	19
Huayi Brothers (华谊兄弟)	Qi Yandi (戚砚笛)		B	C	C	B	B	55	45	27	19	17	17	18	15	18
HIM International Music (Taiwan)	Wu Yun-ting (Note: Member of Taiwanese girl group Popu Lady) (吴昀廷)		D	D	Eliminated			94	95	95	Eliminated					
HIM International Music (Taiwan)	Liu Yu-shan (刘宇珊)		F	D	Eliminated			84	86	85	Eliminated					
C.Y Media	Lin Chia-an (林珈安)		C	B	Eliminated			62	62	72	Eliminated					
Wenlan Culture (闻澜文化)	Yang Chaoyue (杨超越)	19	C	F	A	A	A	4	3	3	4	2	2	9	7	3
Wenlan Culture (闻澜文化)	Yang Meiqi (杨美琪)		F	D	Eliminated			54	55	69	Eliminated					
Wenlan Culture (闻澜文化)	Yang Meiling (杨美玲)		D	F	Eliminated			75	84	87	Eliminated					
Wenlan Culture (闻澜文化)	Zhao Ling (赵羚)		F	Eliminated				98	Eliminated							
T-Trainee Culture	Wu Yingxiang (吴映香)		A	B	B	C	B	14	16	17	29	25	26	26	19	22
MOMO Limited	Zhang Xinlei (张鑫磊)		F	F	Eliminated			57	65	56	Eliminated					
Huakai Banxia Culture	Zhang Chuhan (Note: Member of Chinese girl group Hello Girls) (张楚寒)		F	C	D	Eliminated		31	57	48	52	56	55	Eliminated		
Huakai Banxia Culture	Jiang Yanxi (姜彦汐)		D	D	Eliminated			80	87	58	Eliminated					
Huakai Banxia Culture	Zhang Xinjie (张新洁)		D	F	Eliminated			79	82	65	Eliminated					
Huakai Banxia Culture	Wu Xiaoxuan (吴小萱)		F	D	Eliminated			88	51	61	Eliminated					
Universal Music Taiwan (Record label)	Kimberley Chen Fang-yu (Note: The label that manages Kimberley Chen is Sharp Music, however she joined the show under her distribution label, which is Universal Music Taiwan.) (陈芳语)		A	B	A	B	Eliminated	7	13	8	17	21	19	24	26	Eliminated
Rhonin Studio	Zhang Yuwen (张瑜纹)		B	D	Eliminated			99	98	97	Eliminated					
Rhonin Studio	Liu Jiaying (刘佳莹)		D	C	Eliminated			87	92	94	Eliminated					
Mango Entertainment	Lü Xiaoyu (吕小雨)		A	A	B	B	B	35	20	19	20	22	20	16	18	20
Lajin Media	Wang Juemeng (王珏萌)		C	D	Eliminated			100	99	99	Eliminated					
Lajin Media	Zhang Xinyue (张馨月)		B	D	Eliminated			36	47	64	Eliminated					
Qigu Culture	Lai Meiyun (Note: Member of Chinese girl group S.I.N.G. (Chinese: SING女团)) (赖美云)		B	B	B	B	A	18	17	16	12	14	14	7	9	6
Qigu Culture	Jiang Shen (蒋申)		C	C	Saved	C	Eliminated	56	46	59	38	26	25	22	23	Eliminated
Qigu Culture	Xu Shiyin (许诗茵)		D	F	Eliminated			72	76	75	Eliminated					
K-L Entertainment	Sunnee Yang Yunqing (Note: Member of Taiwanese girl group A'N'D) (杨芸晴) / (เกวลิน บุญศรัทธา)	21	A	B	A	A	A	6	7	7	8	7	8	11	11	8
K-L Entertainment	Zhao Yaoke (Note: Member of Chinese girl group KOGIRLS) (赵尧珂)		F	D	B	B	Eliminated	17	12	12	18	18	18	19	24	Eliminated
K-L Entertainment	Wang Qing (王晴)		B	C	B	Eliminated		9	9	13	27	33	39	Eliminated		
K-L Entertainment	Yu Meihong (于美红)		C	F	C	Eliminated		25	28	30	30	39	41	Eliminated		
K-L Entertainment	Lucia Chen Yingyan (陈盈燕)		C	D	Eliminated			34	44	57	Eliminated					
K-L Entertainment	Zheng Chengcheng (郑丞丞)		C	F	Left			93	Left the show							
AKB48 CHINA	Liu Nian (刘念)		C	F	Saved	Eliminated		61	48	63	47	41	42	Eliminated		
AKB48 CHINA	Mao Weijia (毛唯嘉)		D	D	Eliminated			64	59	70	Eliminated					
YY Media	Fan Wei (范薇)		C	C	C	C	Eliminated	22	24	26	24	30	33	28	28	Eliminated
YY Media	Liu Sixian (刘思纤)		D	D	C	Eliminated		76	41	34	50	52	54	Eliminated		
YY Media	Wu Qian (吴茜)		D	C	D	Eliminated		74	78	51	54	57	57	Eliminated		
YY Media	Xiang Yuxing (向俞星)		C	F	D	Eliminated		30	64	46	56	58	56	Eliminated		
YY Media	Chen Yifan (陈怡凡)		D	D	Eliminated			66	70	81	Eliminated					
Sanmei Entertainment	Jiao Manting (焦曼婷)		F	D	B	B	Eliminated	19	19	24	28	20	22	33	35	Eliminated
Zhiyi Media	Ren Zhen (Note: Member of Chinese pre-debut project group YZ.Girls) (任真)		D	D	Eliminated			73	63	66	Eliminated					
Zhiyi Media	Hu Yue'er (Note: Former member of Korean girl group O21 (2016–2017)) (胡悦儿)		D	D	Eliminated			67	68	78	Eliminated					
Dream Entertainment	Ju Lin (菊麟)		D	F	D	Eliminated		71	81	50	42	45	45	Eliminated		
Dream Entertainment	Shao Xia (邵夏)		F	C	Eliminated			92	80	73	Eliminated					
Checkmate Entertainment	Yang Han (杨晗)		C	B	Eliminated			89	93	93	Eliminated					
Checkmate Entertainment	Li Tianyun (Note: Member of Chinese girl group ACEMAX-RED) (Note: Former contestant on Korean idol survival show The Unit: Idol Rebooting Project (October 2017 – February 2018)) (李天韻)		D	D	Eliminated			43	67	80	Eliminated					
Z-Cherry Culture	Yang Bing (杨冰)		D	F	D	Eliminated		26	54	55	49	48	49	Eliminated		
Z-Cherry Culture	Chen Yuyan (陈语嫣)		C	B	Eliminated			41	71	82	Eliminated					
Z-Cherry Culture	Xia Shijie (夏诗洁)		F	C	Eliminated			48	75	84	Eliminated					
Poodoo Entertainment	Wang Ting (Note: Member of Chinese pre-debut project group MOI) (王婷)		F	B	D	C	Eliminated	50	52	45	31	43	34	32	31	Eliminated
Poodoo Entertainment	Gou Xueying (勾雪莹)		D	D	D	Eliminated		69	66	47	40	47	48	Eliminated		
Long WuTian Culture	Duan Aojuan (段奥娟)	17	B	C	A	A	A	3	4	6	6	8	5	4	5	4
Zimei Tao Culture	Gao Qiuzi (Note: Member of Chinese girl group Lady Bees (Chinese: 蜜蜂少女队; pinyin: Mìfēng Shàonǚ Duì)) (高秋梓)		D	D	B	A	A	21	18	20	13	11	11	8	10	16
Zimei Tao Culture	Xu Mengjie (徐梦洁)	23	C	C	B	B	B	13	15	15	16	16	16	15	16	11
Zimei Tao Culture	Han Dan (韩丹)		D	D	Eliminated			91	89	89	Eliminated					
ETM Academy	Liu Renyu (Note: Member of Chinese pre-debut girl group Oxygen Girls (the group was later renamed, and debuted as Chic Chili [Chinese: 西可西丽; pinyin: Xīkě Xīlì])) (刘人语)		A	A	B	B	B	24	22	22	14	15	15	14	13	13
ETM Academy	Luo Yijia (罗奕佳)		B	B	B	C	Eliminated	44	27	23	36	31	32	36	36	Eliminated
ETM Academy	Su Ruiqi (苏芮琪)		C	B	C	C	Eliminated	78	29	28	39	29	29	21	25	Eliminated
ETM Academy	Ma Xingyu (马兴钰)		D	F	B	Eliminated		28	25	25	58	55	53	Eliminated		
ETM Academy	Zhang Jingxuan (张静萱)		D	F	Eliminated			95	53	62	Eliminated					
ETM Academy	Wang Yalin (王雅凛)		C	D	Eliminated			85	73	77	Eliminated					
ETM Academy	Yan Kexin (颜可欣)		C	D	Eliminated			97	97	98	Eliminated					
Rongyi Culture	Zhou Xue (Note: Member of Chinese girl group Idol School (Chinese: 偶像学园; pinyin: Ǒuxiàng Xuéyuán; lit. 'Idol Academy') (not to be confused with the unrelated 2017 Korean girl group survival show Idol School)) (周雪)		F	C	Eliminated			53	49	60	Eliminated					
Ivy Culture	Lu Xiaocao (鹿小草)		D	F	C	C	Eliminated	27	32	36	21	23	28	30	32	Eliminated
JC Universe Entertainment	Yamy Guo Ying (郭颖)	26	A	A	A	A	A	1	2	2	3	4	4	6	4	5
JC Universe Entertainment	Wei Jin (魏瑾)		A → B	B	C	C	Eliminated	39	30	32	32	32	27	31	30	Eliminated
JC Universe Entertainment	Luo Yitian (罗怡恬)		C	C	C	C	Eliminated	60	38	37	33	27	30	35	34	Eliminated
JC Universe Entertainment	Du Jinyu (杜金雨)		C	C	D	Eliminated		59	37	44	46	38	37	Eliminated		
JC Universe Entertainment	Chou Chou (丑丑)		A → B	B	D	Eliminated		58	42	43	37	44	44	Eliminated		
JC Universe Entertainment	Luo Zhiyi (罗智仪)		B	B	D	Eliminated		70	39	41	44	49	50	Eliminated		
Huanri Shiji Culture	Qiu Luqing (邱路晴)		D	F	Eliminated			101	100	100	Eliminated					
Huanri Shiji Culture	Yin Rouyi (尹柔懿)		D	F	Eliminated			86	90	91	Eliminated					
Huanri Shiji Culture	Zhu Jiaxi (朱佳希) / (JC)		D	D	Eliminated			49	77	86	Eliminated					
Huaying Yixing	Li Ziting (Note: Former contestant on The Voice Kids Thailand (2013)) (李紫婷) / (พร้อมวิไล หลี่ศิริโรจน์)	18	A → B	A	A	A	A	11	11	11	11	6	6	5	6	9
DongLun Media	Wang Mohan (王莫涵)		D	C	D	B	Eliminated	33	35	49	25	19	21	29	29	Eliminated
JOY Entertainment	Chen Yihan (陈意涵)		C	F	C	C	B	20	26	31	35	37	35	25	21	14
JXJY Culture	Yin Rui (尹蕊)		F	C	C	Eliminated		45	50	39	53	54	58	Eliminated		
Individual Trainee	Wang Ju (Note: One of the "amateur" contestants, introduced in episode 2, who had never received any previous professional idol training.) (王菊)		C	C	Saved	B	A		94	90	55	36	23	2	2	15
Individual Trainee	Ge Jiahui (Note: Member of SNH48 Team NII, but joined the show as an individual trainee) (葛佳慧)		D	C	B	Eliminated		10	14	14	34	42	43	Eliminated		
Individual Trainee	Luo Tianshu (罗天舒)		C	C	Eliminated			82	91	92	Eliminated					
ReDu Music	Liu Danmeng (刘丹萌)		A → B	B	C	C	Eliminated	38	34	38	43	34	36	34	33	Eliminated
SDT Entertainment	Gao Yingxi (高颖浠)		C	A	C	B	B		31	29	15	12	12	13	14	17
SDT Entertainment	Wu Qianying (吴芊盈)		B	A	C	C	Eliminated		33	33	22	24	24	27	27	Eliminated
Esee Model Management	Re Yina (热依娜)		A	F	B	Eliminated			21	21	26	35	40	Eliminated		
RealShow Entertainment	Cindy Fan Lina (Note: Member of Chinese girl group 3unshine (Sunshine)) (范麗娜)		F	Eliminated				15	Eliminated							
RealShow Entertainment	Dora Wang Xiaodie (王小蝶)		F	Eliminated				68	Eliminated							
RealShow Entertainment	Abby Ji Xinyue (吉星月)		F	Left				23	Left the show							

== Evaluations ==
=== Group Battle Performances (Episode 3) ===
Color key

Winning Team
"Skilled" Centre
"Diligent" Centre

#	Team	Original Artist(s)	Song	Team Name	Contestants
1	斌斌的啦 (Ella and Hu Yanbin)	S.H.E	中国话 (Chinese Language)	酱酱酱酱酱酱 (JiangJiangJiangJiangJiangJiang)	Yamy
1	斌斌的啦 (Ella and Hu Yanbin)	S.H.E	中国话 (Chinese Language)	酱酱酱酱酱酱 (JiangJiangJiangJiangJiangJiang)	Wei Jin
1	斌斌的啦 (Ella and Hu Yanbin)	S.H.E	中国话 (Chinese Language)	酱酱酱酱酱酱 (JiangJiangJiangJiangJiangJiang)	Mena
1	斌斌的啦 (Ella and Hu Yanbin)	S.H.E	中国话 (Chinese Language)	酱酱酱酱酱酱 (JiangJiangJiangJiangJiangJiang)	Du Jinyu
1	斌斌的啦 (Ella and Hu Yanbin)	S.H.E	中国话 (Chinese Language)	酱酱酱酱酱酱 (JiangJiangJiangJiangJiangJiang)	Ni Quiyun
1	斌斌的啦 (Ella and Hu Yanbin)	S.H.E	中国话 (Chinese Language)	酱酱酱酱酱酱 (JiangJiangJiangJiangJiangJiang)	Wang Ju
1	志杰晋级 (Zhang Jie and Show Luo)	Hua Chenyu	异类 (Aliens)	闭眼玩家 (Close-Eyed Player)	Ju Lin
1	志杰晋级 (Zhang Jie and Show Luo)	Hua Chenyu	异类 (Aliens)	闭眼玩家 (Close-Eyed Player)	Li TianYyun
1	志杰晋级 (Zhang Jie and Show Luo)	Hua Chenyu	异类 (Aliens)	闭眼玩家 (Close-Eyed Player)	Blair
1	志杰晋级 (Zhang Jie and Show Luo)	Hua Chenyu	异类 (Aliens)	闭眼玩家 (Close-Eyed Player)	Gou Xueying
1	志杰晋级 (Zhang Jie and Show Luo)	Hua Chenyu	异类 (Aliens)	闭眼玩家 (Close-Eyed Player)	JC
1	志杰晋级 (Zhang Jie and Show Luo)	Hua Chenyu	异类 (Aliens)	闭眼玩家 (Close-Eyed Player)	Yin Rouyi
2	志杰晋级 (Zhang Jie and Show Luo)	Mayday	我又初恋了 (Another First Love)	你的初恋 (Your First Love)	Wu Xuanyi
2	志杰晋级 (Zhang Jie and Show Luo)	Mayday	我又初恋了 (Another First Love)	你的初恋 (Your First Love)	Luo Yitian
2	志杰晋级 (Zhang Jie and Show Luo)	Mayday	我又初恋了 (Another First Love)	你的初恋 (Your First Love)	Luo Zhiyi
2	志杰晋级 (Zhang Jie and Show Luo)	Mayday	我又初恋了 (Another First Love)	你的初恋 (Your First Love)	Wu Qian
2	志杰晋级 (Zhang Jie and Show Luo)	Mayday	我又初恋了 (Another First Love)	你的初恋 (Your First Love)	Wang Yiran
2	志杰晋级 (Zhang Jie and Show Luo)	Mayday	我又初恋了 (Another First Love)	你的初恋 (Your First Love)	Yang Ruihan
2	斌斌的啦 (Ella and Hu Yanbin)	Maroon 5	Sugar	怎么看怎么丑 (Ugly however you look)	Sunnee
2	斌斌的啦 (Ella and Hu Yanbin)	Maroon 5	Sugar	怎么看怎么丑 (Ugly however you look)	Li Zixuan
2	斌斌的啦 (Ella and Hu Yanbin)	Maroon 5	Sugar	怎么看怎么丑 (Ugly however you look)	Xu Mengjie
2	斌斌的啦 (Ella and Hu Yanbin)	Maroon 5	Sugar	怎么看怎么丑 (Ugly however you look)	Xu Jingyun
2	斌斌的啦 (Ella and Hu Yanbin)	Maroon 5	Sugar	怎么看怎么丑 (Ugly however you look)	Liu Danmeng
2	斌斌的啦 (Ella and Hu Yanbin)	Maroon 5	Sugar	怎么看怎么丑 (Ugly however you look)	Yin Rui
2	斌斌的啦 (Ella and Hu Yanbin)	Maroon 5	Sugar	怎么看怎么丑 (Ugly however you look)	Re Yina
3	志杰晋级 (Zhang Jie and Show Luo)	Mavis Fan	那种女孩 (That Kind of Girl)	要你管哦 (Not your business)	Chen Fangyu
3	志杰晋级 (Zhang Jie and Show Luo)	Mavis Fan	那种女孩 (That Kind of Girl)	要你管哦 (Not your business)	Chen Yuyan
3	志杰晋级 (Zhang Jie and Show Luo)	Mavis Fan	那种女孩 (That Kind of Girl)	要你管哦 (Not your business)	Lin Jia'an
3	志杰晋级 (Zhang Jie and Show Luo)	Mavis Fan	那种女孩 (That Kind of Girl)	要你管哦 (Not your business)	Liu Yushan
3	志杰晋级 (Zhang Jie and Show Luo)	Mavis Fan	那种女孩 (That Kind of Girl)	要你管哦 (Not your business)	Wu Yunting
3	志杰晋级 (Zhang Jie and Show Luo)	Mavis Fan	那种女孩 (That Kind of Girl)	要你管哦 (Not your business)	Qiu Luqing
3	斌斌的啦 (Ella and Hu Yanbin)	Tanya Chua	红色高跟鞋 (Red High Heels)	Hotty	Li Ziting
3	斌斌的啦 (Ella and Hu Yanbin)	Tanya Chua	红色高跟鞋 (Red High Heels)	Hotty	Zhang Jingxuan
3	斌斌的啦 (Ella and Hu Yanbin)	Tanya Chua	红色高跟鞋 (Red High Heels)	Hotty	Wu Yingxiang
3	斌斌的啦 (Ella and Hu Yanbin)	Tanya Chua	红色高跟鞋 (Red High Heels)	Hotty	Liu Sixian
3	斌斌的啦 (Ella and Hu Yanbin)	Tanya Chua	红色高跟鞋 (Red High Heels)	Hotty	Zhang Yuwen
4	斌斌的啦 (Ella and Hu Yanbin)	JJ Lin	不潮不用花钱 (High Fashion)	Super Lady	Fu Jing
4	斌斌的啦 (Ella and Hu Yanbin)	JJ Lin	不潮不用花钱 (High Fashion)	Super Lady	Wang Mohan
4	斌斌的啦 (Ella and Hu Yanbin)	JJ Lin	不潮不用花钱 (High Fashion)	Super Lady	Xia Shijie
4	斌斌的啦 (Ella and Hu Yanbin)	JJ Lin	不潮不用花钱 (High Fashion)	Super Lady	Wang Ting
4	斌斌的啦 (Ella and Hu Yanbin)	JJ Lin	不潮不用花钱 (High Fashion)	Super Lady	Qi Yandi
4	斌斌的啦 (Ella and Hu Yanbin)	JJ Lin	不潮不用花钱 (High Fashion)	Super Lady	Shao Xia
4	志杰晋级 (Zhang Jie and Show Luo)	Show Luo	撑腰 (Support)	罩腰镜 (Magic Mirror)	Meng Meiqi
4	志杰晋级 (Zhang Jie and Show Luo)	Show Luo	撑腰 (Support)	罩腰镜 (Magic Mirror)	Zhang Xi
4	志杰晋级 (Zhang Jie and Show Luo)	Show Luo	撑腰 (Support)	罩腰镜 (Magic Mirror)	Jiang Jinger
4	志杰晋级 (Zhang Jie and Show Luo)	Show Luo	撑腰 (Support)	罩腰镜 (Magic Mirror)	Zhou Xue
4	志杰晋级 (Zhang Jie and Show Luo)	Show Luo	撑腰 (Support)	罩腰镜 (Magic Mirror)	Jiang Shen
4	志杰晋级 (Zhang Jie and Show Luo)	Show Luo	撑腰 (Support)	罩腰镜 (Magic Mirror)	Chen Yifan
5	斌斌的啦 (Ella and Hu Yanbin)	Mavis Fan	你的甜蜜 (Your Sweetness)	螃蟹研究队 (Crab Investigation Team)	Zhu Tiantian
5	斌斌的啦 (Ella and Hu Yanbin)	Mavis Fan	你的甜蜜 (Your Sweetness)	螃蟹研究队 (Crab Investigation Team)	Fan Wei
5	斌斌的啦 (Ella and Hu Yanbin)	Mavis Fan	你的甜蜜 (Your Sweetness)	螃蟹研究队 (Crab Investigation Team)	Liu Dexi
5	斌斌的啦 (Ella and Hu Yanbin)	Mavis Fan	你的甜蜜 (Your Sweetness)	螃蟹研究队 (Crab Investigation Team)	Lin Junyi
5	斌斌的啦 (Ella and Hu Yanbin)	Mavis Fan	你的甜蜜 (Your Sweetness)	螃蟹研究队 (Crab Investigation Team)	Ren Zhen
5	斌斌的啦 (Ella and Hu Yanbin)	Mavis Fan	你的甜蜜 (Your Sweetness)	螃蟹研究队 (Crab Investigation Team)	Liu Niyi
5	斌斌的啦 (Ella and Hu Yanbin)	Mavis Fan	你的甜蜜 (Your Sweetness)	螃蟹研究队 (Crab Investigation Team)	Gao Yingxi
5	志杰晋级 (Zhang Jie and Show Luo)	TFBOYS	宠爱 (Tender Love)	让我宠你吧 (Let us give you tender love)	Liu Renyu
5	志杰晋级 (Zhang Jie and Show Luo)	TFBOYS	宠爱 (Tender Love)	让我宠你吧 (Let us give you tender love)	Wang Qing
5	志杰晋级 (Zhang Jie and Show Luo)	TFBOYS	宠爱 (Tender Love)	让我宠你吧 (Let us give you tender love)	Zhao Yaoke
5	志杰晋级 (Zhang Jie and Show Luo)	TFBOYS	宠爱 (Tender Love)	让我宠你吧 (Let us give you tender love)	Chen Yingyan
5	志杰晋级 (Zhang Jie and Show Luo)	TFBOYS	宠爱 (Tender Love)	让我宠你吧 (Let us give you tender love)	Yang Han
5	志杰晋级 (Zhang Jie and Show Luo)	TFBOYS	宠爱 (Tender Love)	让我宠你吧 (Let us give you tender love)	Wang Juemeng
6	斌斌的啦 (Ella and Hu Yanbin)	Jay Chou	爷爷泡的茶 (Grandfather's Tea)	状元功夫茶 (Champion Kung Fu Tea)	Qiang DongYue
6	斌斌的啦 (Ella and Hu Yanbin)	Jay Chou	爷爷泡的茶 (Grandfather's Tea)	状元功夫茶 (Champion Kung Fu Tea)	Chiao Manting
6	斌斌的啦 (Ella and Hu Yanbin)	Jay Chou	爷爷泡的茶 (Grandfather's Tea)	状元功夫茶 (Champion Kung Fu Tea)	Lu Xiaoyu
6	斌斌的啦 (Ella and Hu Yanbin)	Jay Chou	爷爷泡的茶 (Grandfather's Tea)	状元功夫茶 (Champion Kung Fu Tea)	Zhang Xinyue
6	斌斌的啦 (Ella and Hu Yanbin)	Jay Chou	爷爷泡的茶 (Grandfather's Tea)	状元功夫茶 (Champion Kung Fu Tea)	Tan Churan (Chou Chou)
6	斌斌的啦 (Ella and Hu Yanbin)	Jay Chou	爷爷泡的茶 (Grandfather's Tea)	状元功夫茶 (Champion Kung Fu Tea)	Luo Tianshu
6	斌斌的啦 (Ella and Hu Yanbin)	Jay Chou	爷爷泡的茶 (Grandfather's Tea)	状元功夫茶 (Champion Kung Fu Tea)	Han Dan
6	志杰晋级 (Zhang Jie and Show Luo)	BAAD	好想大声说爱你 (Want to loudly say I love you)	哆唻咪发嗦啦嘻哆 (Do Re Mi Fa So La Ti Do)	Lu Xiaocao
6	志杰晋级 (Zhang Jie and Show Luo)	BAAD	好想大声说爱你 (Want to loudly say I love you)	哆唻咪发嗦啦嘻哆 (Do Re Mi Fa So La Ti Do)	Zhang Zining
6	志杰晋级 (Zhang Jie and Show Luo)	BAAD	好想大声说爱你 (Want to loudly say I love you)	哆唻咪发嗦啦嘻哆 (Do Re Mi Fa So La Ti Do)	Yang Meiling
6	志杰晋级 (Zhang Jie and Show Luo)	BAAD	好想大声说爱你 (Want to loudly say I love you)	哆唻咪发嗦啦嘻哆 (Do Re Mi Fa So La Ti Do)	Su Ruiqi
6	志杰晋级 (Zhang Jie and Show Luo)	BAAD	好想大声说爱你 (Want to loudly say I love you)	哆唻咪发嗦啦嘻哆 (Do Re Mi Fa So La Ti Do)	Lui Jiaying
6	志杰晋级 (Zhang Jie and Show Luo)	BAAD	好想大声说爱你 (Want to loudly say I love you)	哆唻咪发嗦啦嘻哆 (Do Re Mi Fa So La Ti Do)	Wang Manjun
6	志杰晋级 (Zhang Jie and Show Luo)	BAAD	好想大声说爱你 (Want to loudly say I love you)	哆唻咪发嗦啦嘻哆 (Do Re Mi Fa So La Ti Do)	Yan Kexin
7	志杰晋级 (Zhang Jie and Show Luo)	Jacky Cheung	头发乱了 (Hair is Messy)	洗剪吹 (Wash Cut Dry)	Zhang Xinjie
7	志杰晋级 (Zhang Jie and Show Luo)	Jacky Cheung	头发乱了 (Hair is Messy)	洗剪吹 (Wash Cut Dry)	Zhang Xinlei
7	志杰晋级 (Zhang Jie and Show Luo)	Jacky Cheung	头发乱了 (Hair is Messy)	洗剪吹 (Wash Cut Dry)	Ge JiaHui
7	志杰晋级 (Zhang Jie and Show Luo)	Jacky Cheung	头发乱了 (Hair is Messy)	洗剪吹 (Wash Cut Dry)	Yang Bing
7	志杰晋级 (Zhang Jie and Show Luo)	Jacky Cheung	头发乱了 (Hair is Messy)	洗剪吹 (Wash Cut Dry)	Mao Weijia
7	志杰晋级 (Zhang Jie and Show Luo)	Jacky Cheung	头发乱了 (Hair is Messy)	洗剪吹 (Wash Cut Dry)	Hu Yue'er
7	斌斌的啦 (Ella and Hu Yanbin)	Dragon Pig	全部都是你 (All About You)	一队 (Number One Team)	Jiang Yanxi
7	斌斌的啦 (Ella and Hu Yanbin)	Dragon Pig	全部都是你 (All About You)	一队 (Number One Team)	Yang Chaoyue
7	斌斌的啦 (Ella and Hu Yanbin)	Dragon Pig	全部都是你 (All About You)	一队 (Number One Team)	Wu Xiaoxuan
7	斌斌的啦 (Ella and Hu Yanbin)	Dragon Pig	全部都是你 (All About You)	一队 (Number One Team)	Yang Meiqi
7	斌斌的啦 (Ella and Hu Yanbin)	Dragon Pig	全部都是你 (All About You)	一队 (Number One Team)	Pan Junya
7	斌斌的啦 (Ella and Hu Yanbin)	Dragon Pig	全部都是你 (All About You)	一队 (Number One Team)	Xu Shiyin
8	志杰晋级 (Zhang Jie and Show Luo)	Cyndi Wang	爱你 (Love You)	中华田园动物园 (China's Countryside Zoo)	Duan Aojuan
8	志杰晋级 (Zhang Jie and Show Luo)	Cyndi Wang	爱你 (Love You)	中华田园动物园 (China's Countryside Zoo)	Lai Meiyun
8	志杰晋级 (Zhang Jie and Show Luo)	Cyndi Wang	爱你 (Love You)	中华田园动物园 (China's Countryside Zoo)	Liu Nian
8	志杰晋级 (Zhang Jie and Show Luo)	Cyndi Wang	爱你 (Love You)	中华田园动物园 (China's Countryside Zoo)	Wu Qianying
8	志杰晋级 (Zhang Jie and Show Luo)	Cyndi Wang	爱你 (Love You)	中华田园动物园 (China's Countryside Zoo)	Zhang Chuhan
8	志杰晋级 (Zhang Jie and Show Luo)	Cyndi Wang	爱你 (Love You)	中华田园动物园 (China's Countryside Zoo)	Xiang Yuxing
8	志杰晋级 (Zhang Jie and Show Luo)	Cyndi Wang	爱你 (Love You)	中华田园动物园 (China's Countryside Zoo)	Chen Yihan
8	斌斌的啦 (Ella and Hu Yanbin)	Make-Up	少女圣斗士 (Saint Seiya)	炎燚圣斗士 (Brightly Burning Warriors)	Luo Yijia
8	斌斌的啦 (Ella and Hu Yanbin)	Make-Up	少女圣斗士 (Saint Seiya)	炎燚圣斗士 (Brightly Burning Warriors)	Gao Quizi
8	斌斌的啦 (Ella and Hu Yanbin)	Make-Up	少女圣斗士 (Saint Seiya)	炎燚圣斗士 (Brightly Burning Warriors)	Ma Xingyu
8	斌斌的啦 (Ella and Hu Yanbin)	Make-Up	少女圣斗士 (Saint Seiya)	炎燚圣斗士 (Brightly Burning Warriors)	Rui Meng
8	斌斌的啦 (Ella and Hu Yanbin)	Make-Up	少女圣斗士 (Saint Seiya)	炎燚圣斗士 (Brightly Burning Warriors)	Wang Yaling
8	斌斌的啦 (Ella and Hu Yanbin)	Make-Up	少女圣斗士 (Saint Seiya)	炎燚圣斗士 (Brightly Burning Warriors)	Yu Meihong

=== Position Evaluation Performances (Episode 6) ===
Color key

Popularity Queen
Pending Trainees

Bold denotes the person who picked the team members (highest ranking trainees from the previous round of eliminations)

#	Position	Original Artist(s)	Song	Team Name	Contestants	Votes
1	Dance	Gong Linna	忐忑 (Uneasy)	美人鱼 (Mermaids)	**Meng Meiqi**	562
1	Dance	Gong Linna	忐忑 (Uneasy)	美人鱼 (Mermaids)	Du Jinyu	123
1	Dance	Gong Linna	忐忑 (Uneasy)	美人鱼 (Mermaids)	Mena	208
1	Dance	Gong Linna	忐忑 (Uneasy)	美人鱼 (Mermaids)	Yang Bing	268
1	Dance	Gong Linna	忐忑 (Uneasy)	美人鱼 (Mermaids)	Jiang Shen	533
2	Composition	-	木兰说 (Mulan Says)	走火入魔之太太你有事吗 (Madam, do you have a problem with getting obsessed?)	**Yamy**	348
2	Composition	-	木兰说 (Mulan Says)	走火入魔之太太你有事吗 (Madam, do you have a problem with getting obsessed?)	Sunnee	346
2	Composition	-	木兰说 (Mulan Says)	走火入魔之太太你有事吗 (Madam, do you have a problem with getting obsessed?)	Wei Jin	404
2	Composition	-	木兰说 (Mulan Says)	走火入魔之太太你有事吗 (Madam, do you have a problem with getting obsessed?)	Ge Jiahui	104
2	Composition	-	木兰说 (Mulan Says)	走火入魔之太太你有事吗 (Madam, do you have a problem with getting obsessed?)	Chiao Manting	304
2	Composition	-	木兰说 (Mulan Says)	走火入魔之太太你有事吗 (Madam, do you have a problem with getting obsessed?)	Wang Ju	253
3	Composition	-	麻烦少女 (Troublesome Girl)	-	**Yang Chaoyue**	252
3	Composition	-	麻烦少女 (Troublesome Girl)	-	Chen Yihan	417
3	Composition	-	麻烦少女 (Troublesome Girl)	-	Lu Xiaocao	232
3	Composition	-	麻烦少女 (Troublesome Girl)	-	Liu Renyu	526
3	Composition	-	麻烦少女 (Troublesome Girl)	-	Tan Churan (Chou Chou)	172
3	Composition	-	麻烦少女 (Troublesome Girl)	-	Xu Shiyin	219
4	Vocal	Stefanie Sun	逆光 (Against the Light)	水晶晶 (The Crystals)	**Chen Fangyu**	326
4	Vocal	Stefanie Sun	逆光 (Against the Light)	水晶晶 (The Crystals)	Li Ziting	569
4	Vocal	Stefanie Sun	逆光 (Against the Light)	水晶晶 (The Crystals)	Wu Yingxiang	430
4	Vocal	Stefanie Sun	逆光 (Against the Light)	水晶晶 (The Crystals)	Liu Dexi	309
4	Vocal	Stefanie Sun	逆光 (Against the Light)	水晶晶 (The Crystals)	Chen Yuyan	119
5	Dance	Huang Zitao	Promise	天天用实力说话 (Using our abilities to speak everyday)	**Wu Xuanyi**	508
5	Dance	Huang Zitao	Promise	天天用实力说话 (Using our abilities to speak everyday)	Jiang Jinger	254
5	Dance	Huang Zitao	Promise	天天用实力说话 (Using our abilities to speak everyday)	Ju Lin	255
5	Dance	Huang Zitao	Promise	天天用实力说话 (Using our abilities to speak everyday)	Zhang Chuhan	310
5	Dance	Huang Zitao	Promise	天天用实力说话 (Using our abilities to speak everyday)	Wang Mohan	310
5	Dance	Huang Zitao	Promise	天天用实力说话 (Using our abilities to speak everyday)	Zhu Tiantian	91
6	Dance	Taylor Swift	Look What You Made Me Do	Surprise	**Xu Mengjie**	491
6	Dance	Taylor Swift	Look What You Made Me Do	Surprise	Luo Yitian	321
6	Dance	Taylor Swift	Look What You Made Me Do	Surprise	Su Ruiqi	323
6	Dance	Taylor Swift	Look What You Made Me Do	Surprise	Wu Qian	224
6	Dance	Taylor Swift	Look What You Made Me Do	Surprise	Xiang Yuxing	361
7	Vocal	ONE OK ROCK	Liar	佛系少女 (Buddhist Girls)	**Fu Jing**	397
7	Vocal	ONE OK ROCK	Liar	佛系少女 (Buddhist Girls)	Zhang Zining	465
7	Vocal	ONE OK ROCK	Liar	佛系少女 (Buddhist Girls)	Qi Yandi	206
7	Vocal	ONE OK ROCK	Liar	佛系少女 (Buddhist Girls)	Luo Yijia	99
8	Dance	Xiao Quan	海草舞 (Seaweed Dance)	海草帮 (Seaweed Gang)	**Li Zixuan**	423
8	Dance	Xiao Quan	海草舞 (Seaweed Dance)	海草帮 (Seaweed Gang)	Wu Qianying	442
8	Dance	Xiao Quan	海草舞 (Seaweed Dance)	海草帮 (Seaweed Gang)	Yu Meihong	326
8	Dance	Xiao Quan	海草舞 (Seaweed Dance)	海草帮 (Seaweed Gang)	Zhang Xi	239
8	Dance	Xiao Quan	海草舞 (Seaweed Dance)	海草帮 (Seaweed Gang)	Ma Xingyu	119
9	Vocal	DJ Snake	Let Me Love You	白雪女王和公主们 (Snow White Queens and Princesses)	**Duan Aojuan**	420
9	Vocal	DJ Snake	Let Me Love You	白雪女王和公主们 (Snow White Queens and Princesses)	Xu Jingyun	479
9	Vocal	DJ Snake	Let Me Love You	白雪女王和公主们 (Snow White Queens and Princesses)	Lai Meiyun	458
9	Vocal	DJ Snake	Let Me Love You	白雪女王和公主们 (Snow White Queens and Princesses)	Gao Qiuzi	352
9	Vocal	DJ Snake	Let Me Love You	白雪女王和公主们 (Snow White Queens and Princesses)	Liu Nian	151
10	Dance	Tiger Hu	覅忒好 (Can't Get Better Than This)	新郎团 (Bridegroom Team)	**Zhao Yaoke**	295
10	Dance	Tiger Hu	覅忒好 (Can't Get Better Than This)	新郎团 (Bridegroom Team)	Wang Ting	396
10	Dance	Tiger Hu	覅忒好 (Can't Get Better Than This)	新郎团 (Bridegroom Team)	Liu Danmeng	271
10	Dance	Tiger Hu	覅忒好 (Can't Get Better Than This)	新郎团 (Bridegroom Team)	Luo Zhiyi	232
10	Dance	Tiger Hu	覅忒好 (Can't Get Better Than This)	新郎团 (Bridegroom Team)	Yang Han	254
11	Vocal	Yoon Mi-rae	Always	裙子特大号 爱你的心也特大号 (Supersized dresses and supersized hearts that love you)	**Qiang Dongyue**	284
11	Vocal	Yoon Mi-rae	Always	裙子特大号 爱你的心也特大号 (Supersized dresses and supersized hearts that love you)	Gou Xueying	256
11	Vocal	Yoon Mi-rae	Always	裙子特大号 爱你的心也特大号 (Supersized dresses and supersized hearts that love you)	Re Yina	279
11	Vocal	Yoon Mi-rae	Always	裙子特大号 爱你的心也特大号 (Supersized dresses and supersized hearts that love you)	Liu Sixian	321
11	Vocal	Yoon Mi-rae	Always	裙子特大号 爱你的心也特大号 (Supersized dresses and supersized hearts that love you)	Luo Tianshu	308
12	Dance	Bruno Mars	Marry You	你的丘比特 (Your Cupid)	**Wang Qing**	286
12	Dance	Bruno Mars	Marry You	你的丘比特 (Your Cupid)	Lu Xiaoyu	596
12	Dance	Bruno Mars	Marry You	你的丘比特 (Your Cupid)	Gao Yingxi	334
12	Dance	Bruno Mars	Marry You	你的丘比特 (Your Cupid)	Fan Wei	368
12	Dance	Bruno Mars	Marry You	你的丘比特 (Your Cupid)	Yin Rui	247

Pending Trainee Votes
Name	Votes
Jiang Shen	301
Wang Ju	90
Liu Nian	59
Yang Han	56
Luo Tianshu	49
Xu Shiyin	36
Chen Yuyan	36

=== Concept Evaluation Performances (Episode 8) ===
Color key

Popularity Queen

Bold denotes centres picked in the previous episode

#	Producer	Song	Team name	Team votes	Guest performer	Contestants	Votes
1	Jin Zhiwen	摩天輪的眼淚 (Ferris Wheel's Tears)	喜欢你 (We Like You)	123	Hu Yitian	**Zhang Zining**	563
1	Jin Zhiwen	摩天輪的眼淚 (Ferris Wheel's Tears)	喜欢你 (We Like You)	123	Hu Yitian	Sunnee	116
1	Jin Zhiwen	摩天輪的眼淚 (Ferris Wheel's Tears)	喜欢你 (We Like You)	123	Hu Yitian	Qiang Dongyue	32
1	Jin Zhiwen	摩天輪的眼淚 (Ferris Wheel's Tears)	喜欢你 (We Like You)	123	Hu Yitian	Wei Jin	21
1	Jin Zhiwen	摩天輪的眼淚 (Ferris Wheel's Tears)	喜欢你 (We Like You)	123	Hu Yitian	Jiang Shen	32
1	Jin Zhiwen	摩天輪的眼淚 (Ferris Wheel's Tears)	喜欢你 (We Like You)	123	Hu Yitian	Chen Yihan	30
2	Zheng Nan	Shiny	Shiny 萤火虫 (Shiny Fireflies)	156	Xiong Ziqi	**Wu Xuanyi**	326
2	Zheng Nan	Shiny	Shiny 萤火虫 (Shiny Fireflies)	156	Xiong Ziqi	Fu Jing	153
2	Zheng Nan	Shiny	Shiny 萤火虫 (Shiny Fireflies)	156	Xiong Ziqi	Su Ruiqi	72
2	Zheng Nan	Shiny	Shiny 萤火虫 (Shiny Fireflies)	156	Xiong Ziqi	Luo Yijia	23
2	Zheng Nan	Shiny	Shiny 萤火虫 (Shiny Fireflies)	156	Xiong Ziqi	Fan Wei	63
2	Zheng Nan	Shiny	Shiny 萤火虫 (Shiny Fireflies)	156	Xiong Ziqi	Gao Yingxi	134
3	Tiger Hu	我就是這種女孩 (I'm That Kind of Girl)	你的女孩 (Your Girls)	286	Xiao Zhan	**Meng Meiqi**	330
3	Tiger Hu	我就是這種女孩 (I'm That Kind of Girl)	你的女孩 (Your Girls)	286	Xiao Zhan	Xu Mengjie	92
3	Tiger Hu	我就是這種女孩 (I'm That Kind of Girl)	你的女孩 (Your Girls)	286	Xiao Zhan	Liu Renyu	143
3	Tiger Hu	我就是這種女孩 (I'm That Kind of Girl)	你的女孩 (Your Girls)	286	Xiao Zhan	Li Ziting	124
3	Tiger Hu	我就是這種女孩 (I'm That Kind of Girl)	你的女孩 (Your Girls)	286	Xiao Zhan	Wang Ting	19
3	Tiger Hu	我就是這種女孩 (I'm That Kind of Girl)	你的女孩 (Your Girls)	286	Xiao Zhan	Gao Qiuzi	55
4	Maria Stratton / K.Chozen / Renzo Bravo	不負青春 (Live Up to Our Youth)	青春无畏 (Fearless Youth)	41	Mao Buyi	**Yang Chaoyue**	111
4	Maria Stratton / K.Chozen / Renzo Bravo	不負青春 (Live Up to Our Youth)	青春无畏 (Fearless Youth)	41	Mao Buyi	Lu Xiaoyu	115
4	Maria Stratton / K.Chozen / Renzo Bravo	不負青春 (Live Up to Our Youth)	青春无畏 (Fearless Youth)	41	Mao Buyi	Liu Danmeng	71
4	Maria Stratton / K.Chozen / Renzo Bravo	不負青春 (Live Up to Our Youth)	青春无畏 (Fearless Youth)	41	Mao Buyi	Qi Yandi	330
4	Maria Stratton / K.Chozen / Renzo Bravo	不負青春 (Live Up to Our Youth)	青春无畏 (Fearless Youth)	41	Mao Buyi	Chiao Manting	54
4	Maria Stratton / K.Chozen / Renzo Bravo	不負青春 (Live Up to Our Youth)	青春无畏 (Fearless Youth)	41	Mao Buyi	Wu Qianying	129
5	master key / ear attack	別人家的小孩 (Someone Else's Kid)	土小孩 (Old Fashioned Kids)	125	Wang Yibo	**Yamy**	83
5	master key / ear attack	別人家的小孩 (Someone Else's Kid)	土小孩 (Old Fashioned Kids)	125	Wang Yibo	Li Zixuan	249
5	master key / ear attack	別人家的小孩 (Someone Else's Kid)	土小孩 (Old Fashioned Kids)	125	Wang Yibo	Chen Fangyu	69
5	master key / ear attack	別人家的小孩 (Someone Else's Kid)	土小孩 (Old Fashioned Kids)	125	Wang Yibo	Wu Yingxiang	59
5	master key / ear attack	別人家的小孩 (Someone Else's Kid)	土小孩 (Old Fashioned Kids)	125	Wang Yibo	Xu Jingyun	250
5	master key / ear attack	別人家的小孩 (Someone Else's Kid)	土小孩 (Old Fashioned Kids)	125	Wang Yibo	Lu Xiaocao	33
6	Alina Smith / Annalise Morelli / Ingemar Aberg	了不起 (Awesome)	一锅乱炖 (A Pot of Messy Stew)	85	Wei Daxun	**Lai Meiyun**	361
6	Alina Smith / Annalise Morelli / Ingemar Aberg	了不起 (Awesome)	一锅乱炖 (A Pot of Messy Stew)	85	Wei Daxun	Wang Ju	171
6	Alina Smith / Annalise Morelli / Ingemar Aberg	了不起 (Awesome)	一锅乱炖 (A Pot of Messy Stew)	85	Wei Daxun	Duan Aojuan	90
6	Alina Smith / Annalise Morelli / Ingemar Aberg	了不起 (Awesome)	一锅乱炖 (A Pot of Messy Stew)	85	Wei Daxun	Luo Yitian	44
6	Alina Smith / Annalise Morelli / Ingemar Aberg	了不起 (Awesome)	一锅乱炖 (A Pot of Messy Stew)	85	Wei Daxun	Wang Mohan	102
6	Alina Smith / Annalise Morelli / Ingemar Aberg	了不起 (Awesome)	一锅乱炖 (A Pot of Messy Stew)	85	Wei Daxun	Zhao Yaoke	40

== Ranking ==
=== Top 11 ===
	E02	E03	E04	E05	E06	E07	E08	E09	E10
1	Yamy	Wu Xuanyi	Wu Xuanyi	Meng Meiqi	Meng Meiqi	Meng Meiqi	Meng Meiqi	Meng Meiqi	Meng Meiqi
2	Qiang Dongyue	Yamy	Yamy	Wu Xuanyi	Yang Chaoyue	Yang Chaoyue	Wang Ju	Wang Ju	Wu Xuanyi
3	Duan Aojuan	Yang Chaoyue	Yang Chaoyue	Yamy	Wu Xuanyi	Wu Xuanyi	Wu Xuanyi	Wu Xuanyi	Yang Chaoyue
4	Yang Chaoyue	Duan Aojuan	Meng Meiqi	Yang Chaoyue	Yamy	Yamy	Duan Aojuan	Yamy	Duan Aojuan
5	Wu Xuanyi	Qiang Dongyue	Qiang Dongyue	Zhang Zining	Zhang Zining	Duan Aojuan	Li Ziting	Duan Aojuan	Yamy
6	Sunnee	Meng Meiqi	Duan Aojuan	Duan Aojuan	Li Ziting	Li Ziting	Yamy	Li Ziting	Lai Meiyun
7	Chen Fangyu	Sunnee	Sunnee	Qiang Dongyue	Sunnee	Zhang Zining	Lai Meiyun	Yang Chaoyue	Zhang Zining
8	Fu Jing	Fu Jing	Chen Fangyu	Sunnee	Duan Aojuan	Sunnee	Gao Qiuzi	Zhang Zining	Sunnee
9	Wang Qing	Wang Qing	Li Zixuan	Fu Jing	Fu Jing	Fu Jing	Yang Chaoyue	Lai Meiyun	Li Ziting
10	Ge Jiahui	Li Zixuan	Fu Jing	Li Zixuan	Qiang Dongyue	Qiang Dongyue	Zhang Zining	Gao Qiuzi	Fu Jing
11	Li Ziting	Li Ziting	Li Ziting	Li Ziting	Gao Qiuzi	Gao Qiuzi	Sunnee	Sunnee	Xu Mengjie

== Elimination chart ==
Color key

Final members of Rocket Girls 101
Contestant eliminated in the final episode
Contestant eliminated in the third elimination round
Contestant eliminated in the second elimination round
Contestant eliminated in the first elimination round
Contestant eliminated in the second episode
Contestant left the show

105 contestants
Meng Meiqi (孟美岐)	Wu Xuanyi (吴宣仪)	Yang Chaoyue (杨超越)	Duan Aojuan (段奥娟)	Yamy (郭颖)
Lai Meiyun (赖美云)	Zhang Zining (张紫宁)	Sunnee (杨芸晴)	Li Ziting (李紫婷)	Fu Jing (傅菁)
Xu Mengjie (徐梦洁)	Li Zixuan (李子璇)	Liu Renyu (刘人语)	Chen Yihan (陈意涵)	Wang Ju (王菊)
Gao Qiuzi (高秋梓)	Gao Yingxi (高颖浠)	Qi Yandi (戚砚笛)	Angela Hui (许靖韵)	Lu Xiaoyu (吕小雨)
Qiang Dongyue (强东玥)	Wu Yingxiang (吴映香)	Jiang Shen (蒋申)	Zhao Yaoke (赵尧珂)	Su Ruiqi (苏芮琪)
Kimberley (陈芳语)	Wu Qianying (吴芊盈)	Fan Wei (范薇)	Wang Mohan (王莫涵)	Wei Jin (魏瑾)
Wang Ting (王婷)	Lu Xiaocao (鹿小草)	Liu DanMeng (刘丹萌)	Luo Yitian (罗怡恬)	Jiao Manting (焦曼婷)
Luo Yijia (罗奕佳)	Du Jinyu (杜金雨)	Zhu Tiantian (朱天天)	Wang Qing (王晴)	Re Yina (热依娜)
Yu Meihong (于美红)	Liu Nian (刘念)	Ge Jiahui (葛佳慧)	Chou Chou (丑丑)	Ju Lin (菊麟)
Liu Dexi (刘德熙)	Jiang Jinger (江璟儿)	Gou Xueying (勾雪莹)	Yang Bing (杨冰)	Luo Zhiyi (罗智仪)
Zhang Xi (张溪)	Mena (邵西蒙娜)	Ma Xingyu (马兴钰)	Liu Siqian (刘思纤)	Zhang Chuhan (张楚寒)
Xiang Yuxing (向俞星)	Wu Qian (吴茜)	Yin Rui (尹蕊)	Zhang Xinlei (张鑫磊)	Lucia Chen (陈盈燕)
Jiang Yanxi (姜彦汐)	Zhou Xue (周雪)	Wu Xiaoxuan (吴小萱)	Zhang Jingxuan (张静萱)	Zhang Xinyue (张馨月)
Zhang Xinjie (张新洁)	Ren Zhen (任真)	Ni Qiuyun (倪秋云)	Yang Ruihan (杨蕊涵)	Yang Meiqi (杨美琪)
Mao Weijia (毛唯嘉)	Lin Junyi (林君怡)	Lin Jiaan (林珈安)	Shao Xia (邵夏)	Blair (王玥)
Xu Shiyin (许诗茵)	Pan Junya (潘珺雅)	Wang Yalin (王雅凛)	Hu Yueer (胡悦儿)	Zhang Ruimeng (张芮萌)
Li Tianyun (李天韻)	Chen Yifan (陈怡凡)	Chen Yuyan (陈语嫣)	Wang Yiran (王亦然)	Xia Shijie (夏诗洁)
Liu Yushan (刘宇珊)	Zhu Jiaxi (朱佳希)	Yang Meiling (杨美玲)	Liu Niyi (刘尼夷)	Han Dan (韩丹)
Yin Rouyi (尹柔懿)	Luo Tianshu (罗天舒)	Yang Han (杨晗)	Liu Jiaying (刘佳莹)	Wu Yunting (吴昀廷)
Wang Manjun (王曼君)	Zhang Yuwen (张瑜纹)	Yan Kexin (颜可欣)	Wang Juemeng (王珏萌)	Qiu Luqing (邱路晴)
Zheng Chengcheng (郑丞丞)	Abby (吉星月)	Cindy (范麗娜)	Dora (王小蝶)	Zhao Ling (赵羚)

== Episodes ==
=== Episode 1 (April 21, 2018) ===
The audience is introduced to the Lady Bee trio who walks in to a dark studio wondering where to go. The lights suddenly turn on and 101 seats are shown. Similar to the Korean counterpart, contestants are introduced by label and choose where they want to sit from #1 to #101. Once every girl is seated, the studio darkens and Tao introduces the mentors with each of the mentors performing their own song. After the performances by the mentors have ended, contestants perform with their label mates or a pre-made group to be evaluated from grades A to F. During the episode, it is revealed that only 11 trainees are only to be sorted into the A group, once 11 girls are filled, another girl that has been given the A rank will have to take a girl's nominated seat, voluntarily if a girl in the top 11 chooses to downgrade to the B rank or through a battle. At the end of the episode, we see 11 spots filled yet Yamy is given an A rank. The mentors discuss heavily to choose whom to demote to B rank. They choose Qiang Dongyue and she agrees to a battle with Yamy. Yamy wins the battle and Qiang Dongyue is reluctantly demoted to the B rank.

=== Episode 2 (April 28, 2018) ===
The evaluations go on where former SNH48 member Ge Jiahui performs with her group and trainees continually get evaluated to their respective ranks. There is a twist after all 101 girls are graded when the mentors announce that girls who are not from idol companies will also be competing for a spot in the top 101. If any of them get above an F grade, they may take the spot of another girl in F grade, eliminating her from the competition. Gao Yingxi, Wu Qianying and Re Yina take Cindy, Dora and Zhao Ling's place on the show. Re Yina also receives an A grade and battles Li Ziting for her spot in A class. Re Yina wins. Sunnee questions the mentors on this decision and Tao responds saying Re Yina's style is more unique and Li Ziting went off key during the vocal part of the battle while Ye Rina did not. Tao reassures the trainees that if they felt they were placed in an incorrect grade if they work hard it will be seen.

The girls arrive at their dorms and all the trainees envy A class' rooms being pink and bigger than all the others and having its own couch. Yina and Sunnee are placed in the same room which causes some tension between them.

During the first class, it is revealed that Abby left the competition overnight and one of the girls from the non-idol companies, Wang Ju, will be taking her place in C class. The F class girls walk into their small practice room and become emotional at seeing an easel with motivational writing on it in the middle of the room. All of them make a promise to move up. In A class, Re Yina has a hard time matching the tones of the vocal teacher and keeping up with the dance. Li Zixuan in B class gets called up to sing with Ella and begins to cry. Ella motivates her and gets her some sunglasses to cover her eyes to overcome her fear of singing in front of people.

For the first evaluation, it is revealed that the girls will come up five at a time and dance and sing the theme song in front of everyone. Yang Chaoyue performs poorly and cries afterwards due to embarrassment and stress. When Zhu Tiantian performs, she dances incorrectly and sings loudly and incorrectly, throwing off the other contestants dancing with her. This causes Gao Qiuzi to cry from the shock and stress. The other trainees accuse Zhu Tiantian of just wanting screen time and not caring if it affects other trainees in their individual interviews.

When it comes to F class's turn to be re-graded, Show Luo surprises them by saying only one trainee has remained in F class and the rest have moved up. A class has their re-gradings read out in front of everyone. The biggest change is Re Yina going from A class to F class.

=== Episode 3 (May 5, 2018) ===
The next mission is revealed to be a battle mission like the other 101 series. However, this time the 16 leaders and centres are already chosen and split into two types of eight each. Eight "Skilled" centres and eight "Diligent" centres. The "Diligent" centres are chosen from the eight girls who spent the most time practising while the eight "Skilled" centres are chosen by the mentors and restricted to A and B class. The rest of the girls choose whose team they want to be in by standing behind them. The battles are also not two teams performing the same songs, instead, the centres of each team pick the song they want from a list of 16 songs given to them. On the night of the performances, the mentors form two teams representing eight groups each. The mentors play black and white match to decide who will announce their first group first.

At the end of all of the performances, both teams are left at four points each. As such, the result of the team battle is decided by who received the most votes out of everyone who performed. The person with the most votes was Meng Meiqi, meaning that Zhang Jie and Show Luo's team won the battle.

=== Episode 4 (May 13, 2018) ===
The girls walk into the room and figure out that only the top 55 will remain in the competition. The rankings are announced and it is revealed that their rank will determine their grade from that point on with ranks 55-41 becoming D class, ranks 40-26 becoming C class, ranks 25-12 becoming B class and ranks 11-1 becoming A class. Wu Xuanyi comes 1st and Yang Bing comes 55th. It is then revealed that the eight girls from the winning teams who gained the most votes in the public performances can each pick one member from their teams from the previous round who is not in the top 55 to avoid elimination and join the top 55 as a pending trainee. Tao explains that the pending trainees will not be able to make any choices in the next mission and the 3 pending trainees who get the most votes will stay in the competition. Meng Meiqi saves Jiang Shen (rank 59), Qiang Dongyue saves Luo Tianshu (rank 92), Duan Aojuan saves Liu Nian (rank 63), Sunnee's whole team entered the top 55 without being saved so Sunnee cannot save anyone, Zhao Yaoke saves Yang Han (rank 93), Yamy saves Wang Ju (rank 90), Kimberley saves Chen Yuyan (rank 82) and Yang Chaoyue saves Xu Shiyin (rank 75).

=== Episode 5 (May 19, 2018) ===
The episode starts with the girls calling their families before the first elimination. The procedure for the second mission is revealed. There are six mentors that will hold three different classes; vocal (Ella and Zhang Jie), dance (Show Luo and Wang Yibo) and composition (Hu Yanbin and Lin Yoga). The girls will write down which class they want from most to least (1 being top pick, 3 being bottom pick). The mentors then look through the lists and pick which girls they want. If there are too many top picks for their class, they must choose which girls not to pick and if they do not have enough top picks they must choose some girls who did not pick that class as their top pick. There are 10 spots in composition, 19 spots in vocal and 31 spots in dance. The classes are then split into 12 groups; 2 in composition, 4 in vocal and 6 in dance. The team leaders for all 12 teams are picked from the highest ranked girls within that class. The leaders pick which girls they want to fill their team. The girls race for the song they want by relay, the boards with the song names are on a wall and they have to try to take the board they want. During the race for the dance team's songs, one of the girls falls and all the other girls keep running. This makes Tao very angry and he scolds the girls for many things including their actions during the elimination, talking during filming, not listening and not caring when the girl fell over. The dance teams are made to run again. All the teams then practice for their performance.

=== Episode 6 (May 26, 2018) ===
The teams perform their stages with Meng Meiqi's group going first as she received the most votes on the last stage. It is noticed that there is a chair on the left-hand side of the stage, the chair is revealed to be for the overall popularity queen during the position battle stages. Meng Meiqi is the first popularity queen as her team goes first and she received the most votes within her team. It is explained that if another team's popularity queen receives more votes than her, they can dethrone her. It is also explained that the popularity queens in each team will also get to choose which group to perform next regardless of dethroning the current overall popularity queen or not. The team chosen to perform next is always chosen by the previous team's popularity queen. Meng Meiqi is dethroned by Li Ziting, and Li Ziting is dethroned by Lu Xiaoyu on the last performance, who then becomes the overall popularity queen. The seven pending trainees gather on stage for a voting round to see who will stay and who will be eliminated officially. Jiang Shen, Wang Ju and Liu Nian become normal trainees again.

=== Episode 7 (June 2, 2018) ===
The episode starts with the girls lounging around in their dorms. They get an irregular announcement from Tao where he expresses his sorrow that the next time they meet, some of the girls will be leaving. He also announces and the staff have organised an activity for the girls and each dorm is given a set amount of money. The girls may go out and spend the money on decorations for their dorm room. The dorms will be judged and the winning dorm will win a surprise. The popularity award prize is a voucher to go out and watch a movie, the prize for the best design is a cute dollhouse of the dorm. Meng Meiqi, Yamy, Qiang Dongyue and Sunnee's team wins the best design award and Wang Qing, Gao Quizi, Xu Mengjie and Ma Xingyu's dorm wins the popularity award. The ranks are announced company by company with JC Universe Entertainment being announced first as they are the only group with all of their members currently in the competition. After the rankings, the top 36 girls have a special segment called "Us, whom you did not know" where the girls get to show off skills previously unknown to the public. Then Tao reveals the next mission which, like the other seasons, is the album missions. There are six songs. The centres are chosen by the fans from the girls who received the most votes for each song. The centres are Meng Meiqi (I Am That Kind Of Girl), Wu Xuanyi (Shiny), Yamy (Someone Else's Kid), Yang Chaoyue (Living Up To Our Youth), Zhang Zining (Tears Of A Ferris Wheel) and Lai Meiyun (Awesome). Tao then announces that there will be six male idol seniors joining in the performances, one in each team. Each of them has left a secret message for the girls to try and guess who they are. The episode ends after the first secret message is played.

=== Episode 8 (June 9, 2018) ===
The 36 girls are presented with 30 gifts on a table. Each of the 30 gifts somehow represents one of the six male idols that will join the teams. Everyone except the centres can pick a gift. The male idols are already assigned to a group so the gift the trainee picks determines which group they will join. Before the girls pick their gifts, the secret messages from each idol are played. The idols, which songs they picked and their gifts are revealed and the teams are formed. The group perform their songs and are then all invited back onstage so the fans can vote for their favourite team, the team that wins will receive a special coaching class from all of the mentors. I Am That Kind Of Girl wins the prize and Zining is crowned overall popularity queen.

=== Episode 9 (June 16, 2018) ===
In this episode, the elimination instead, took place on a cruise unlike the past few rounds. From there, 14 of them were eliminated, leaving only 22 contestants who will be participating in the finals. The girls were then asked to choose between the songs "Bye Bye Baby" (Wang Ju, Wu Xuanyi, Yamy, Duan Aojuan, Lai Meiyun, Gao Qiuzi, Sunnee, Fu Jing, Liu Renyu, Li Zixuan, Angela Hui) and "Full Bloom" (Meng Meiqi, Li Ziting, Yang Chaoyue, Zi Ning, Gao Yingxi, Qi Yandi, Xu Mengjie, Lu Xiaoyu, Wu Yingxiang, Qiang Dongyue, Chen Yihan).

=== Episode 10 (June 23, 2018) ===
This episode begins with all 101 contestants dancing to the theme song "Produce 101 Girls" (Pick Me). The girls then performed either a "dance" or "vocal" performance individually. The dance group performed Ariana Grande's Break Free, and the vocal group performed Penny Tai's 路. The episode thereafter cuts to the girls performing "Against Odds", followed by "Full Bloom" accordingly to their groups assigned in Episode 9. By the end of the episode, the rankings were announced and Meng Meiqi (with a vote count of 185,244,357), was crowned first place and center of the group, with Wu Xuanyi at second (with a vote count of 181,533,349). It was also revealed that the debuting group will be called "Rocket Girls 101". With that, the show ended with the newly formed group performing to their debut song "Rocket Girls".

== Aftermath ==
- Rocket Girls 101 debuted on June 23, 2018 right after eleven members were announced. They disbanded on June 23, 2020.
Other contestants
- Su Ruiqi (25th), Liu Nian (42nd), Lin Junyi (77th), and Blair (80th) participated in Produce Camp 2020. Blair was eliminated in episode 9 after being ranked 17th. The rest were eliminated in the finale after Lin Junyi being ranked 10th, Su Ruiqi ranked 11th and Liu Nian ranked 12th.
- Gou Xueying (48th) and Zhang Chuhan (55th) participated in Youth With You Season 2. Xueying was eliminated in Episode 16 after being ranked 48th and Chuhan was also eliminated in Episode 20 after being ranked 27th.
- Mena (52nd) has moved to South Korea and is now in S2 Entertainment's first group, Hot Issue, under her stage name, Mayna.
- Su Ruiqi (25th) participated in Girls Planet 999 and was eliminated in the finale after ranking 13th.

== Franchise ==
Preceded by —	Chuang (franchise); Produce 101 China	Succeeded by Produce Camp 2019
