= Dance of the Phoenix =

Television series

- Traditional Chinese: 且聽鳳鳴
- Simplified Chinese: 且听凤鸣
- Hanyu Pinyin: Qiě Tīng Fèng Míng
- Genre: Historical fiction; Fantasy; Adventure
- Based on: Godly Empress Doctor by Su Xiao Nuan
- Directed by: Ka Lam Chan
- Starring: Yang Chaoyue; Xu Kaicheng
- Country of origin: China
- Original language: Mandarin
- No. of seasons: 1
- No. of episodes: 30

Production
- Running time: 45 mins
- Production companies: Tencent Pictures; Tencent Penguin Pictures

Original release
- Release: August 10 – September 9, 2020

Dance of the Phoenix (Chinese: 且听凤鸣; pinyin: Qiě Tīng Fèng Míng) is a 2020 Chinese television series starring Yang Chaoyue and Xu Kaicheng.

== Synopsis ==
Medicine student Meng Yuan finds herself transported into the body of a woman named Feng Wu – who lives in a fantasy land where magic and martial arts rule the world. Feng Wu, a former genius girl is discarded after falling victim to a plot against her. She is engaged to a prince named Jun Lin Yuan. The forces of evil are strong in this strange land, however. And Meng Yuan soon discovers that if she is to make her life as Feng Wu a success, she will have to learn how to defend herself against danger and make powerful friends. Could she learn to love her new life – and her new husband, too?

== Cast ==
Main

| Actor | Character | Introduction |
|---|---|---|
| Yang Chaoyue | Feng Wu | The former genius girl in Junwu Continent, the second person who possessed the true blood of the Phoenix |
| Xu Kaicheng | Jun Lin Yuan | The prince of the Junwu clan, has a marriage agreement with Fengwu, and likes Fengwu. |

Supporting

| Actor | Character | Introduction |
|---|---|---|
| Fu Jing | Zuo Qing Luan | The noble daughter of the Junwu clan, who is kind-hearted and generous on the surface, but scheming and vicious underneath. |
| Estelle Chen | Yin Zhao Ge | Feng Wu's silly and sweet best friend. |
| Vardy Wang | Yu Ming Ye | The young master of the Dark Night court, who has an arrogant and domineering personality. |
| Caesar Guo | Feng Xun | Friend of Xuan Yi and Jun Lin Yuan |
| Gao Jicai | Xuan Yi | Friend of Jun Lin Xuan and Feng Xun |

== OST ==
| No. | Song title | Artist | Notes |
|---|---|---|---|
| 1. | That Time Have Wind (那时有风) | Meng Ran | |
| 2. | Lin Zhou (临渊) | Jiao Wan Qi | |
| 3. | Tai Chu (太初) | Shuang Sheng & Jun Shuo | |
| 4. | Record of Empty City (空城记) | Fu Jing | |
| 5. | Runaway Fairy (落跑精灵) | Estelle Chen | |
