= Yamy =

Chinese-language singer and actor

- 郭颖
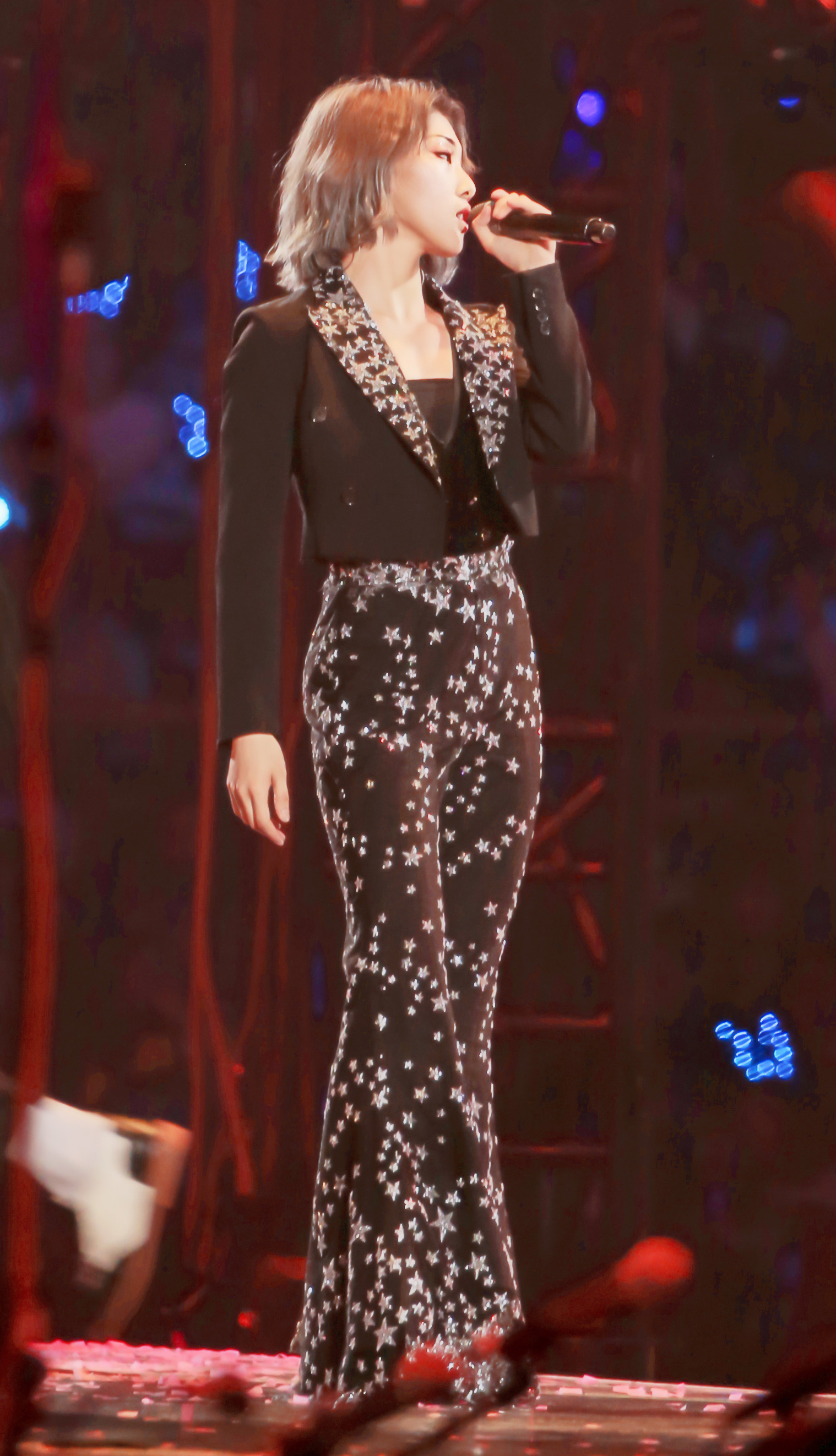
- Yamy at the "2019 Rocket Girl 101 Flight Concert FLOWER · Guangzhou", Guangzhou Baoneng International Sports Arena, March 30, 2019
- Born: Guo Ying; October 7, 1991 (age 34); Qingyuan, Guangdong, China
- Occupations: Singer; Rapper; Dancer
- Years active: 2017–present
- Musical career
- Also known as: Yamy Jiàng (Yamy 酱), 鸭米
- Genres: C-pop; Mandopop; K-pop
- Label: JC Universe Entertainment
- Formerly of: Rocket Girls 101

Guo Ying (born 7 October 1991), better known by her stage name Yamy, is a Chinese singer, rapper and dancer under JC Universe Entertainment. She was the leader of the Chinese girl group Rocket Girls 101.

== Personal life ==
Guo Ying was born in Qingyuan, Guangdong on October 7, 1991. She was the leader of the Kuchika, and graduated from the Zhongshan Campus of Guangdong Pharmaceutical University.

== Career ==
=== Pre-debut: 1vs11 and The Rap of China ===
Before making her debut in 2017, Ying was chosen to take part in 1vs11, a reality show by JC Universe and there she was picked out along with other 9 members to be given a debut chance. Guo joined The Rap of China produced by iQiyi as a contestant. However, she was eventually eliminated.

=== 2017: Debut with first single, "Ay" ===
On 23 September 2017, Yamy released her debut single "Ay". In December, her second single, titled "乌鸦" was released on YouTube.

=== 2018–present: Produce 101 and debut with Rocket Girls 101 ===
In 2018, Guo participated in the Chinese reality survival girl group show Produce 101 China aired from April 21 to June 23 on Tencent Video. Guo eventually placed 5th overall with a total vote of 108 million and debuted as a member of Rocket Girls 101 on 23 June as the main rapper, dancer and the group's leader.

On June 23, 2020, The Rocket Girls 101 officially disbanded as their group was a temporary one under Tencent Video that the contract will last only for 2 years. Yamy is now making a comeback to JC Universe Entertainment and will continue to pursue her career as a rapper and dancer.

== Discography ==
=== Singles ===
Title	Year	Peak chart positions	Album
Title	Year	Billboard	Album
Poor Wretch	2017	—	Non-album singles
Ay	2017	—	Non-album singles
乌鸦	2017	—	Non-album singles
Wish You Happy	2020	—	EP Birthday Special
"—" denotes releases that did not chart or were not released in that region.

=== Promotional singles ===
Title	Year	Peak chart positions	Album
Title	Year	Billboard	Album
"万yoo引力"	2018	—	yoo Video app Promo single
"别惹女孩 (Don't mess with the girl)"	2018	—	The Spy Who Dumped Me Promo single
"—" denotes releases that did not chart or were not released in that region.

=== Others ===
Year	Title	Album	Notes
2017	把喇叭开到最大	Non-album single	With Kuchika Orchestra

== Filmography ==
=== Television shows ===
Year	Title	Network	Notes
2016	1vs11	Online	Trainee
2017	The Rap of China S1	iQiyi	Contestant
2018	Produce 101	Tencent Video	Contestant; Finished 5th
2020	Chuang 2020	Tencent Video	Senior Guest
2020	We are Blazing	Tencent Video	Contestant
2020	Super Nova Games 3	Tencent Video	Red Team
2020	The Big Band Season 2	iQiyi	Collab with HAYA
2021	Stage Boom	iQiyi	Contestant
2024	Sisters who Makes Waves S5	MangoTV	Contestant
2024	Show it All	MangoTV	Guest Performer
