= Duan Aojuan =

Chinese singer (born 2000)

- 段奧娟
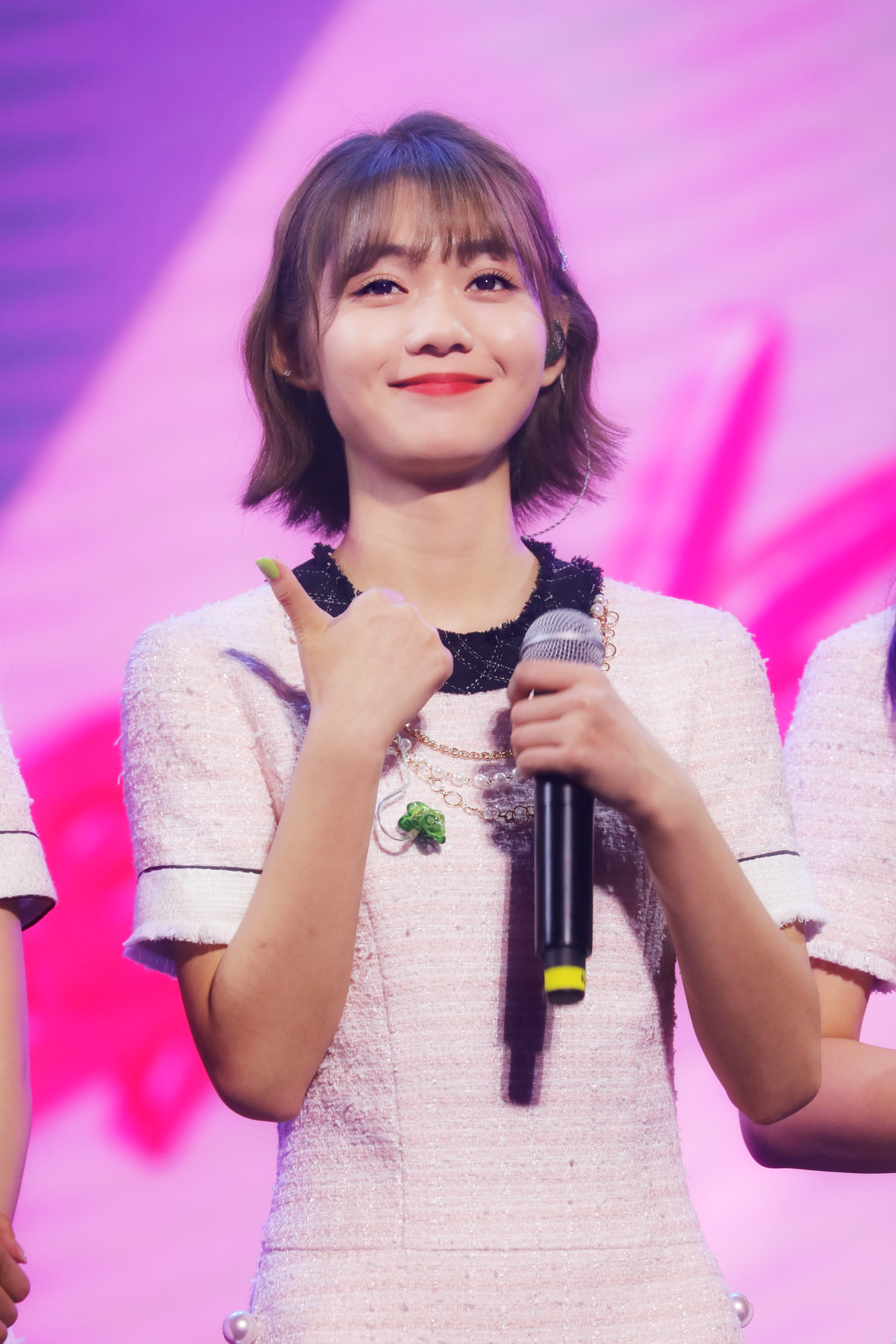
- Duan in 2019
- Born: Duān Aòjuān; December 28, 2000 (age 25); Chengdu, Sichuan, China
- Occupations: Singer; Actress
- Musical career
- Genre: Mandopop
- Instrument: Vocals
- Years active: 2018–present
- Labels: I.E.One Entertainment; WAJIJIWA Entertainment (Note: As a member of Rocket Girls 101 only.)
- Formerly of: Rocket Girls 101

Chinese name
- Chinese: 段奧娟
Transcriptions
Standard Mandarin
- Hanyu Pinyin: Duān Aòjuān

Duan Aojuan (born December 28, 2000) is a Chinese singer. She became a member of Rocket Girls 101 after finishing fourth in the survival show Produce 101.

== Early life ==
Born on 28 December 2000, Duan graduated from Chengdu No. 44 High School.

== Career ==
=== 2018-present: Produce 101 and debut with Rocket Girls 101 ===
In 2018, Duan participated in the Chinese reality survival girl group show Produce 101 China aired from April 21 to June 23 on Tencent Video. Duan was eventually placed 4th overall in the final episode and debuted as a member of Rocket Girls 101 on 23 June as the main vocalist. She has made several notable soundtrack appearances for films such as "幸福的時光" in The Island, "毒液前來" for promotion of Venom and "福气拱拱来" in Boonie Bears: Blast into the Past.

== Discography ==
=== Soundtrack appearances ===
Title	Year	Peak chart positions	Album
Title	Year	CHN (Note: The Billboard China Top 100 was launched in January 2019 by Billboard China.)	Album
"陪我長大"	2018	81	Please Take My Brother Away! OST
"幸福的時光"	2018	—	The Island OST
"斯卡布罗集市"	2018	—	Once Upon A Bite OST
"我不願明白"	2018	93	Mystery of Antiques OST
"一起走的幸福"	2019	64	Go Go Squid OST
"最了不起的你"	2019	93	The King's Avatar OST
"—" denotes releases that did not chart or were not released in that region.

== Filmography ==
=== Television shows ===
Year	Title	Network	Notes	Ref.
2018	Produce 101 China	Tencent Video	Contestant; Finished 4th	
2018	Rocket Girls 101: Reality Show	Tencent Video		
2018	The Coming One Season 2	Tencent Video		
2018	Idol Hits	IQIYI		
2018	Rave Now	Tencent Video		
2018	Super Nova Games Season 1	Tencent Video		
2019	Rampaging 20's	Tencent Video		
2019	Day Day Up	Mango TV		
2019	Produce Camp 2019	Tencent Video		
2019	The Coming One Season 3	Tencent Video		
2019	Let's Sing Together	Tencent Video		
2019	Super Nova Games Season 2	Tencent Video		
2020	The Treasured Voice Season 1	Zhejiang Television		
2020	Goose House Good Times	Tencent Video		
2020	Rampaging 20's Season 2	Tencent Video		
2020	Produce Camp 2020	Tencent Video		
2020	We Are Blazing	Tencent Video		
2020	Keep Running Season 8	Zhejiang Television		
2020	Super Nova Games Season 3	Tencent Video		
2021	Liu Tang De Ge Sheng Season 3	GRT Satellite Channel		
2021	Singing for Beijing Central Axis Season 1	BRTV		
2022	Bilibili Go			

Drama

Year	English title	Chinese title	Role	Network
2022	The Silence of the Monster	孤独的野兽	Su Xiaoyue	IQIYI
2023	When I See Your Face	脸盲少女的未知爱情	Luhui	IQIYI
