= Victor Ma =

Chinese singer, songwriter, and actor (born 1996)

- Born: March 20, 1996 (age 30); New York City, U.S.
- Other name: Ma Boqian
- Education: University of Southern California
- Occupations: Singer, songwriter, actor
- Years active: 2017–present
- Father: Ma Qingyun
- Musical career
- Origin: Beijing, China
- Genres: Pop, hip hop
- Instruments: Vocals
- Label: Wajijiawa Entertainment

Chinese name
- Traditional Chinese: 馬伯騫
- Simplified Chinese: 马伯骞
Transcriptions
Standard Mandarin
- Hanyu Pinyin: Mǎ Bóqiān

Victor Ma (simplified Chinese: 马伯骞; traditional Chinese: 馬伯騫; pinyin: Mǎ Bóqiān; born March 20, 1996) is a Chinese American singer, songwriter, and actor. He debuted his career by winning second place at the 2017 Chinese talent competition show, The Coming One. In 2018, Ma released his solo debut single, "I Am Awake". In 2019, he released his first EP, Untitled. In 2020, he featured in the Chinese web series, Detective Chinatown. In the same year, he released his second EP, The Textbook. In 2021, he featured in the Chinese film, Detective Chinatown 3.

== Early life and education ==
Ma was born in New York City on March 20, 1996. His father Ma Qingyun and mother Li Shouning are both architects, and his maternal grandfather Li Ange was a coach of China women's national volleyball team. He moved to Shanghai with his family when he was four, and he took both elementary school and junior high school in Shanghai Pinghe School. He moved to Los Angeles when he was thirteen, and then he attended Los Angeles County High School for the Arts and University of Southern California, and he took part in a number of singing competitions during the school period. In 2014, he took part in the Water Cube Cup Chinese Songs Contest For Overseas Chinese Youth, and eventually won the bronze award.

== Career ==
=== The one successful and aftermath ===
On June 10, 2017, Ma began to take part in the Tencent talent competition show, The Coming One, and eventually won second place on September 23, 2017. On November 4, 2017, the finalists from The Coming One embarked the concert tour The Coming One Tour in Nanjing, China. On December 8, 2017, Ma released the single "Halo, It's Me" with Chinese singer Vin Zhou. On December 14, 2017, he released the live album, Author. On December 15, 2017, he released his solo single, "I Am Awake".

=== Singles and media appearances ===
On January 15, 2018, he released the single "The Next Love" with Chinese actress Jiang Shuying for the 2018 television series, Mr. Right. On March 23, 2018, he released the opening song "Micro World" with Chinese singer He Jie for the 2018 Chinese television series, Only Side by Side with You. On April 10, 2018, he released the single, "Domination". On August 16, 2018, he released the single, "So What". In August 2018, Ma took part in the Chinese reality show, Chao Yin Zhan Ji. In October 2018, he took part in the Chinese releaity show, Beauty. On September 16, 2019, Ma released his first EP, Untitled. On September 19, 2019, Chinese singer Tia Ray released the single, "Complicated", which featured vocals from Ma and was included on Ray's album, 1212. In November 2019, he featured in the Chinese web series, Generational Gravity. On December 31, 2019, he released the ending song "I Don't Believe You" with Chinese singers Chen Zheyuan, Cheng Xiao, Li Mingxuan, and Cui Yuxin for the 2020 Chinese web series, Detective Chinatown.

On February 23, 2020, he released the single "You're All I Need" featuring American actress Emma Dumont for the 2020 Chinese television series, Wait in Beijing. On May 1, 2020, he released the opening song "Quicksand" for the 2021 Chinese television series, Beautiful Reborn Flower. In July 2020, he took part in the Chinese reality how, 720 Chao Liu Zhu Li Ren. On August 14, 2020, he released the single "Runway 2.0" with Microsoft chatbot Xiaoice. In October 2020, his voice featured in the Chinese web series, My Catmate. On November 28, 2020, Chinese singer Leah Dou released the song, "Luv U Alien", which featured vocals from Ma and was included on Dou's album, GSG Mixtape. On December 21, 2020, he released the theme song "Fox Hunt" with Chinese singer Pax Congo for the 2021 Chinese film under the same title. On December 28, 2020, Ma released his second EP, The Textbook.

In February 2021, he featured in the Chinese film, Detective Chinatown 3. On February 20, 2021, he released the single "W.T.F (Way Too Fast)" with Chinese singers Huang Zitao and Young13dbaby. On March 2, 2021, he released the single "Alienergy" with Chinese singer Nineone#. In June 2021, he took part in the Chinese reality show, Heart Signal 4. On August 3, 2021, he released the single, "Drip and Lit". On August 5, 2021, he released the single, "Carabiner", which was produced by South Korean duo GroovyRoom. On December 17, 2021, he released the single "Wo Xing Wo Shu" for the 2021 Chinese cartoon, Da Wang Rao Ming. In December 2021, he took part in the Chinese reality show, The Flash Band. In 2023, he appeared in the cdrama Hidden Love as Sangyan alongside Chen Zheyuan and Zhao Lusi. In the same year he took part in the TV show E-pop Unity as a mentor along with Huangzitao and other artists.

== Discography ==
=== Extended plays ===
- Untitled (2019)
- The Textbook (2020)

=== Live albums ===
- Author (2017)

=== Singles ===
- "Halo, It's Me" with Vin Zhou (2017)
- "I Am Awake" (2017)
- "The Next Love" with Jiang Shuying (2018)
- "Micro World" with He Jie (2018)
- "Domination" (2018)
- "So What" (2018)
- "Complicated" by Tia Ray feat. Victor Ma (2019)
- "You're All I Need" feat. Emma Dumont (2020)
- "Boom" by Naomi Wang feat. Victor Ma (2020)
- "Runway 2.0" with Xiaoice (2020)
- "Domination" with Hui Minli (2020)
- "Fox Hunt" with Pax Congo (2020)
- "Do My Thing" (2020)
- "W.T.F (Way Too Fast)" with Huang Zitao and Young13dbaby (2021)
- "Alienergy" with Nineone# (2021)
- "Drip and Lit ("2021)
- "Carabiner" (2021)
- "Lambo" by Nineone# feat. Victor Ma (2021)
- "Time Value" by Huang Jue feat. Victor Ma (2021)
- "Wo Xing Wo Shu" (2021)

=== Other recorded songs ===
- "I Don't Believe You" with Chen Zheyuan, Cheng Xiao, Li Mingxuan, Cui Yuxin (2019)
- "Quicksand" (2020)
- "Luv U Alien" by Leah Dou feat. Victor Ma (2020)
- ‘Be Your Light’ _ Hidden love ost (2023), Victor Ma

== Filmography ==
=== Variety show residencies ===
- The Coming One (2017)
- Chao Yin Zhan Ji (2018)
- Beauty (2018)
- 720 Chao Liu Zhu Li Ren (2020)
- Heart Signal 4 (2021)
- The Flash Band (2021–2022)
- Call me by fire 3 (2023)

=== Web series ===
- Generational Gravity (2019)
- Detective Chinatown (2020)
- My Catmate (2020)
- Hidden Love (2023)
- In Between (2024)
- With Love with You (2025)
- Road to Success (TBA)
- The Great Gym (TBA)
- Thou Shalt Not Love (TBA)
- The Doll Game (TBA)

=== Films ===
- The Day We Lit Up the Sky (2021)
- Detective Chinatown 3 (2021)
- Hidden Love (2023)
