= Detective Chinatown (disambiguation) =

Detective Chinatown is a Chinese comedy-mystery buddy media franchise. Related media works include:

- Detective Chinatown, a 2015 Chinese comedy-mystery buddy film
- Detective Chinatown 2, a 2018 Chinese sequel film
- Detective Chinatown 3, a 2021 Chinese sequel film
- Detective Chinatown (web series), a 2020 Chinese web television series
- Detective Chinatown 1900, a 2025 Chinese sequel film
