= Wang Anyu =

Chinese actor

- Born: 3 February 1998 (age 28); Yuyao, Zhejiang, China
- Education: Communication University of China
- Occupation: Actor
- Years active: 2018–present
- Agent: Easy Plus Entertainment

Chinese name
- Simplified Chinese: 王安宇
Transcriptions
Standard Mandarin
- Hanyu Pinyin: Wáng Ānyǔ

Wang Anyu (Chinese: 王安宇; born 3 February 1998) is a Chinese actor. He is best known for his roles in dramas Dreaming Back to the Qing Dynasty (2019), Twenty Your Life On (2020), The Heiress (2020), The Last Immortal (2023), and Romance in the Alley (2024).

== Career ==
Wang graduated from the Communication University of China, majoring in Broadcasting & Hosting. In 2018, Wang participated in the music variety show The Coming One Season 2. He was then signed on to the agency Easy Plus Entertainment.

In 2019, Wang starred in the youth drama Our Shiny Days. This is his debut work. Wang then starred in historical romance drama Dreaming Back to the Qing Dynasty, portraying the role of Yinxiang.

In 2020, Wang starred in the coming-of-age drama Twenty Your Life On, and gained recognition for his role as a fencer. The same year, he starred in the historical drama The Heiress. In 2021, he played the role of e-sports player Shen Zhe in the urban inspirational drama Go Go Squid 2: Dt. Appledog's Time, the sequel to Go Go Squid!. On the same year, he played the role of figure skater Shao Beisheng in the urban romance drama To Fly with You.

On December 31, he participated in the New Year's Eve Gala "2021-2022 Hunan Satellite TV New Year's Eve Gala" which was broadcast live on Hunan Satellite TV. He also sang the song "The Wind Blows a Summer" with Song Zu'er during the show.

On April 25, 2022, the science fiction drama Ball Lightning starring him started filming. Later, he starred in the urban female inspirational drama Ode to Joy 3, the inspirational youth drama Twenty Your Life On 2 and the sports drama Falling Into You were broadcast successively. Since his debut, Wang has played the roles of a figure skater, a fencing prodigy, and a high jumper. He is known as the "entertainment athlete". When he starred in Falling Into You, he even exercised during filming and went to the gym after filming.

On January 22, 2023, he participated in the "2023 Dragon TV Spring Festival Gala" and sang the song "Give You a Bottle of Magic Potion" with Zhou Ye on the show. On April 7, the urban female inspirational drama Ode to Joy 4 starring him premiered on CCTV's TV drama channel. On October 25, the variety show Divas Hit the Road Season 5 he participated was premiered on Mango TV, where he and other cast members embarked on a Silk Road journey across Saudi Arabia, Croatia, and Iceland. The show became the most popular season in the five-season series of Divas Hit the Road with an audience rating of 8.3 points. On December 11, the ancient costume fantasy drama The Last Immortal starring Zhao Lusi was broadcast, where he played the son of the true god, Gu Jin, whose supernatural power was sealed. It was Wang's first time acting in a costume drama in five years. In order to make himself look like an immortal, Wang worked hard to lose weight in one month, from 73 kg to 65.1 kg. After his debut, Wang Anyu's works were mostly modern dramas and his hairstyle was either a crew cut or a buzz cut, which almost became his signature look. However, in The Last Immortal, he changed to a fairy-like look with long hair. In the same year, Wang won the Tencent Video Starlight Awards New Power Artist of the Year and Weibo Vision Conference Annual Anticipated Actor honors.

On January 28, 2024, the period drama Romance in the Alley he co-starring with Yan Ni and Li Guangjie was completed. On March 8, he and Wang Yuwen started filming the urban romance drama Such a Good Love. On March 16, the urban female inspirational drama Ode to Joy 5 starring him was broadcast. On May 31, he attended the GQ Creative Awards. On July 28, the variety show Crazy Treasure Hunt, in which he participated, was broadcast.

== Filmography ==
=== Film ===
| Year | English title | Chinese title | Role | Ref. |
|---|---|---|---|---|
| 2025 | Return of the Lame Hero | 毕正明的证明 | Bi Zhengming | |
| 2026 | Invictus | 爱是愤怒 | Liu Hao | |

=== Television series ===
| Year | English title | Chinese title | Role | Notes | Ref. |
|---|---|---|---|---|---|
| 2019 | Dreaming Back to the Qing Dynasty | 梦回 | Yinxiang | | |
| 2019 | Our Shiny Days | 闪光少女 | Feng Anyu | | |
| 2020 | Twenty Your Life On | 二十不惑 | Duan Zhenyu | | |
| 2020 | The Heiress | 女世子 | Wang Zhongyu | | |
| 2020 | Forever Love | 百岁之好，一言为定 | Jiang Zhenhan | | |
| 2021 | Go Go Squid 2: Dt. Appledog's Time | 我的时代，你的时代 | Shen Zhe (Grunt) | | |
| 2021 | To Fly with You | 陪你逐风飞翔 | Shao Beisheng | | |
| 2022 | Ode to Joy 3 | 欢乐颂3 | Li Qixing | | |
| 2022 | Twenty Your Life On 2 | 二十不惑2 | Duan Zhenyu | Cameo | |
| 2022 | Falling into You | 炽道 | Duan Yucheng | | |
| 2023 | Ode to Joy 4 | 欢乐颂4 | Li Qixing | | |
| 2023 | The Last Immortal | 神隐 | Gu Jin / Yuan Qi | | |
| 2024 | Ode to Joy 5 | 欢乐颂5 | Li Qixing | | |
| 2024 | Romance in the Alley | 小巷人家 | Lin Dongzhe | | |
| 2025 | Back for You | 漫影寻踪 | A Lai | | |
| 2025 | Such a Good Love | 值得爱 | Zhou Shui | | |
| 2025 | Be Passionately in Love | 陷入我们的热恋 | Chen Luzhou | | |
| TBA | Chasing the Light | 左肩有你 | Gu Fei | | |
| TBA | Ball Lightning | 球状闪电 | Chen Guang | | |

=== Variety shows ===
| Year | English title | Chinese title | Role | Ref. |
|---|---|---|---|---|
| 2018 | The Coming One 2 | 明日之子第二季 | Contestant | |
| 2020 | Super Penguin League; Season:3 | 超级企鹅联盟super3 | Player; Live Basketball Competition | |
| 2023 | Divas Hit the Road 5 | 花儿与少年·丝路季 | Cast member | |
| 2024 | Natural High; Season:2 | 现在就出发 | Cast member | |
| 2025 | Natural High; Season:3 | 现在就出发 | Cast member | |

=== Music video appearances ===
| Year | Artist | Song | Ref. |
|---|---|---|---|
| 2025 | Yuqi | "아프다" | |

== Accolades ==
=== Awards and nominations ===
| Year | Award | Category | Work | Status | Ref. |
|---|---|---|---|---|---|
| 2025 | Tencent Video TV And Movie Award | Popular Variety Show Group of the Year | Natural High; Season 2: Lets Go Now | Won | |

=== Listicles ===
| Year | Publisher | Listicle | Placement | Ref. |
|---|---|---|---|---|
| 2025 | Asia-Pacific Entrepreneurs Association (APEA) | Asia-Pacific U30 Outstanding Young Leaders | Included | |
