= Chen Zheyuan =

Chinese actor (born 1996)

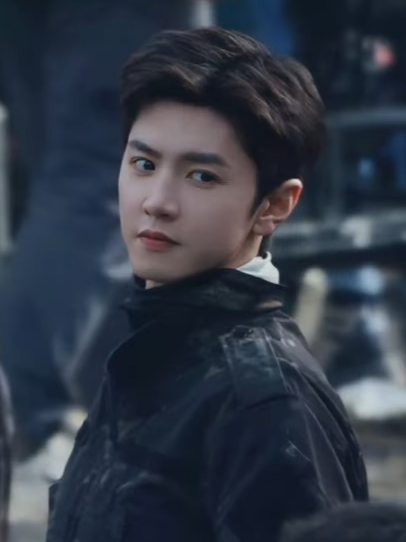
- Chen on the set of the 2025 drama The White Olive Tree
- Born: October 29, 1996 (age 30); Shenzhen, Guangdong, China
- Education: Shenzhen University
- Occupation: Actor
- Years active: 2015–present
- Agent: Gramarie
- Height: 1.80 m (5 ft 11 in)

Chinese name
- Traditional Chinese: 陳哲遠
- Simplified Chinese: 陈哲远
Transcriptions
Standard Mandarin
- Hanyu Pinyin: Chén Zhéyuǎn

Chen Zheyuan (Chinese: 陈哲远; born October 29, 1996) is a Chinese actor. He is known for his roles in the series Handsome Siblings (2020), Our Secret (2021), Mr. Bad (2022), Hidden Love (2023) and Fated Hearts (2025).

== Early life ==
Chen was born on October 29, 1996, in Shenzhen, Guangdong Province. He graduated from the Department of Performance at Shenzhen University.

== Career ==
=== 2017–2019: Beginning ===
In 2017, Chen made his acting debut in the youth drama All About Secrets, based on the novel by Rao Xueman, the series earned 1.1 billion views. In 2018, He starred in the fantasy wuxia drama The Legend of Zu 2 and costume comedy drama Hello Dear Ancestors. He made his big screen debut in the comedy film Miss Puff the same year.

=== 2020 onwards: Rising popularity ===
Chen became known to audiences after starring in the wuxia drama Handsome Siblings in 2020, based on the novel Juedai Shuangjiao by Gu Long. He was praised for his portrayal of the protagonist, Xiao Yu'er ("Little Fish"). He also starred in the costume drama Renascence and the mystery crime drama Detective Chinatown the same year. Chen was also cast in historical dramas The Golden Hairpin alongside Yang Zi.

In 2021, Chen starred as male protagonist Zhou Siyue in Mango TV's youth campus drama Our Secret, alongside Xu Mengjie. The series earned 1.3 billion views on MGTV. He also starred in the 2022 romantic fantasy series Mr. Bad, alongside Shen Yue, both of which brought him further recognition. It gathered 1.3 billion views.

Chen was launched into international stardom in 2023 after he starred in the popular series adaptation of the novel, Hidden Love, by Zhu Yi opposite Zhao Lusi. The drama was aired by Netflix in 190 countries. His striking visuals and brilliant performance as Duan Jiaxu received unanimous praise. The series achieved 4.7 billion views on Youku.

In 2024, iQIYI exclusively released Sword and Fairy 4 on their video streaming platform. Chen played the role of protagonist Yun Tuanhe alongside Ju Jingyi. The series is based on the hit videogame franchise, and garnered 838 million views. Later that year, his next drama Dark Night and Dawn also premiered exclusively on iQIYI and CCTV-8, achieving peak TV ratings of 3.6397%, along with a cumulative revenue of 1.7 billion views on all platforms during broadcast. The total number of views in a single day also exceeded 100 million solidifying a strong performance.

The White Olive Tree is scheduled to be broadcast in February 2025. Chen plays the role of protagonist Li Zan, a bombs unit soldier dispatched to a war torn East country. The series achieved 623 million views. Chen also co-starred with Li Qin in the new costume drama, Fated Hearts, which began filming on July 6, 2024 in Hengdian World Studios and wrapped on October 26, 2024. The series was broadcast in October 2025 and achieved 1.12 billion views.

On July 28, 2026, Royal Betrothal was broadcast on MGTV, the series gained 3.25 billion views. On October 15, Light the Dark was aired on iQIYI with 12 episodes.

== Endorsements ==
Year	Brand	Title	Ref.
2019	Libert'aime	Brand Experience Officer	
2021	ALL LOVE	Brand Ambassador	
2021	Innisfree's	Brand Ambassador	
2021	L'Oréal Paris	Brand Experience Officer	
2023	Shiseido	Brand Ambassador	
2023	FILA	Brand Ambassador	
2023	Deepal	Brand Spokesperson	
2024	PIAGET	Brand Ambassador	
2024	Papa John’s	Brand Spokesperson	
2024	Leader	Brand Ambassador	
2024	YAYA	Brand Spokesperson	
2024	HLA	Brand Ambassador	
2024	Master Kong Iced Tea	Brand Ambassador	
2024	AGE20’s	Brand Spokesperson	
2024	Fujiya	Brand Spokesperson	
2025	Alipay	Chief Experience Officer	
2025	iQIYI	Global Brand Ambassador	
2025	OPPO	Brand Ambassador	
2025	SOCORSKIN	Brand Ambassador	
2025	MUEE	Global Brand Ambassador	
2025	TaoKaeNoi	Global Brand Ambassador	
2026	Mizumi	Asia-Pacific Brand Ambassador	
2026	MaleeCOCO	Asia-Pacific Brand Ambassador	
2026	Yves Saint Laurent (fashion house)	China Brand Ambassador	
2026	SENKA	Asia-Pacific Brand Ambassador	
2026	Yves Saint Laurent (fashion house)	Brand Beauty Ambassador	
2026	JD.com	Fragrance Plan Partner	

== Filmography ==
=== Films ===
Year	Title	Role	Notes	Ref.
2018	Miss Puff	Wang Han	Supporting role	
2021	Detective Chinatown 3	Noda Koji	Guest appearance	

=== Television / web series ===
Year	Title	Role	Network	Notes	Ref.
2017	All About Secrets	Duan Bowen	iQIYI	Main role	
2018	The Legend of Zu 2	Yu Yinqi	iQIYI, Zhejiang TV	Main role	
2018	She Is Beautiful	Lu Xiaowei	Mango TV, Tencent,Shenzhen TV	Supporting role	
2018	Hello Dear Ancestor	Zhen Jun	iQIYI	Main role	
2020	Detective Chinatown	Noda Koji	iQIYI	Main role (Ep. 9-12)	
2020	Handsome Siblings	Jiang Xiaoyu	iQIYI, Tencent, CCTV-8, Netflix	Main role	
2020	Renascence	Ye Junqing	iQIYI, Mango TV	Main role	
2021	Twelve Legends	Bai Yushu	Youku	Cameo (Ep. 1-2)	
2021	Our Secret	Zhou Siyue	Mango TV	Main role	
2022	Mr. Bad	Xiao Wudi	iQIYI	Main role	
2023	Hidden Love	Duan Jiaxu	Youku, Netflix	Main role	
2023	The Princess and the Werewolf	Kui Mulang / Li Xiong	Youku	Main role	
2024	Sword and Fairy 4	Yun Tianhe	iQIYI	Main role	
2024	Dark Night and Dawn	Lin Shaobai	iQIYI, CCTV-8, Jiangsu TV	Main role	
2025	The White Olive Tree	Li Zan	iQIYI	Main role	
2025	Fated Hearts	Feng Suige	IQIYI	Main role	
2026	Royal Betrothal	Ying Gua	Mango TV, Hunan TV	Main role	
2026	Light the Dark	Chen Shan	iQIYI	Main role	
TBA	Winner Is King	Chang Geng	Tencent	Main role	
TBA	The Golden Hairpin	Yu Xuan	Tencent	Supporting role	
TBA	Chasing Dreams	Tang Qianzi	Tencent	Main role	
TBA	Tales of the Floating World	Ao Chi	iQIYI	Main role	
TBA	Echoes	Tu Yin	iQIYI	Main role	
TBA	Rivals	Zhang Chenguang	iQIYI	Main role	

=== Reality television shows ===
Year	Title	Role	Network	Notes	Ref.
2015	King of Pop	Contestant	iQIYI		
2018	Super Novae Games	Contestant	Tencent Video	Team Guangdong	
2020	Wonderful Little Forest	Cast Member	Mango TV	Episode 6-12	
2020	Super Novae Games 3	Contestant	Tencent Video	Team Actors	
2022	The Feast	Host	Zhejiang Television		
2022	The Detectives' Adventures'Season 2	Guest	Zhejiang Television		
2022	Keep Running: Lets Build A Better Life	Guest	Zhejiang Television		
2023	HaHaHaHaHa Season 3	Guest	Tencent Video		
2023	Keep Running Season 11	Guest	Zhejiang Television		
2023	Youth Periplous Season 4	Cast Member	Zhejiang Television		
2024	Random Tour	Cast Member	Mango TV		
2024	Game of Cubes: The New Utopia	Cast Member	Mango TV		
2024	Great Escape Season 6	Cast Member	Mango TV		
2024	Who's the Murderer; Season 9	Guest	Mango TV		
2024	Hello Saturday	Guest	Mango TV		
2024	Keep Running Season 12	Guest	Zhejiang Television		
2025	Natural High; Season:3	Guest	Tencent Video	Episode 7	

== Discography ==
=== Soundtrack appearances ===
Year	English title	Chinese title	Album	Ref.
2017	"Secret"	秘密	All About Secrets OST	
2018	"Fried Chicken Fried Problems"	炸鸡炸烦恼	The Legend of Zu 2 OST	
2018	"Just Like You "	就是喜欢你	The Legend of Zu 2 OST	
2020	"I Don't Believe You"	别轻易相信	Detective Chinatown OST	
2022	"Be My Warrior" (with Shen Yue)	做我的勇士	Mr. Bad OST	

== Awards and nominations ==
Name of the award ceremony, year presented, award category, nominee(s) and result of the nomination
Year	Award ceremony	Category	Nominee / work	Result	Ref.
2020	Hengdian Film and TV Festival of China	Future Star	Handsome Siblings	Won	
2022	Weibo TV and Internet Video Summit	New Actor of the Year	Mr. Bad	Won	
2022	Weibo Night Awards	Progress Actor of the Year	Mr. Bad	Won	
2023	iQIYI Scream Night Awards	Asia-Pacific Popular Actor of the Year	Hidden Love	Won	
2023	Weibo Night Awards	Leap Actor of the Year	Hidden Love	Won	
2024	iQIYI Scream Night Awards	Breakthrough Actor of the Year	Dark Night and Dawn	Won	
2024	Figaro Annual	Fashion Quality Actor	N/A	Won	
2025	Weibo Night Awards	Annual Expressive Actor/ Breakthrough Actor of the Year	N/A	Won	
2026	Weibo Night Awards	Leap Actor of the Year	N/A	Won	
2026	Bazaar Gala	Favorite Actor of the Year	N/A	Won	
