= Love Like the Galaxy =

2022 Chinese historical series

- Promotional poster
- Traditional Chinese: 星漢燦爛·月升滄海
- Simplified Chinese: 星汉灿烂·月升沧海
- Hanyu Pinyin: Xīng Hàn Càn Làn, Yuè Shēng Cāng Hǎi
- Genre: Historical fiction; Romance; Political
- Based on: The Stars Are Brilliant, How Very Fourtunate (星汉灿烂·幸甚至哉) by Guan Xin Ze Luan (关心则乱)
- Written by: Zou Yue; An Yimo
- Directed by: Fei Zhenxiang
- Starring: Wu Lei; Zhao Lusi
- Country of origin: China
- Original language: Mandarin
- No. of seasons: 1
- No. of episodes: 56

Production
- Production location: Hengdian World Studios
- Running time: 45 minutes

Original release
- Network: Tencent Video; WeTV (international); iQIYI (international)
- Release: July 5 – August 18, 2022

Love Like the Galaxy (Chinese: 星汉灿烂·月升沧海; pinyin: Xīng Hàn Càn Làn, Yuè Shēng Cāng Hǎi) is a 2022 Chinese television series. It stars Wu Lei and Zhao Lusi. The series was split into two parts, with the first part premiering on July 5, 2022. The second part started airing on July 27, 2022.

== Plot ==
The story revolves around Cheng Shaoshang (Zhao Lusi), who was left behind by her parents when they went to the battlefield. As a result, she was raised by her scheming aunt and ignorant grandmother. In order to protect herself from the constant abuse and mistreatment, she honed herself to be extra vigilant.

The plot starts with the return of Shaoshang's parents. At first, she hopes that her life will improve after reuniting with them. However, years of estrangement have made it difficult for them to become a family. As she lacked love her whole life, Shaoshang is both pragmatic and insecure when it comes to opening up to others.

She soon meets the Emperor's foster son, Ling Buyi (Wu Lei), whom she views as a cold and ruthless person. However, that notion changes as she continually finds herself involved with him. Through her interactions with Ling Buyi, she unintentionally becomes involved in the mystery surrounding his family and identity.

== Cast ==
=== Main cast ===
- Wu Lei as Ling Buyi / Zisheng
  - Wang Hanzhe as young Ling Buyi

Emperor Wen's foster son, and the son of Huo Junhua and the Marquis of Chengyang. A powerful and ruthless general who is highly favoured by the Emperor. Plagued by the massacre of the Huo clan during the siege of Gu City that happened 15 years prior, he is resolute in finding and punishing the perpetrators.

- Zhao Lusi as Cheng Shaoshang / Niaoniao
  - Li Zhimo as young Cheng Shaoshang

The only daughter of Cheng Shi and Xiao Yuanyi. Abandoned as an infant by her parents due to their participation in the impending war and the prophecy of an old sage, she grew up neglected by her grandmother and aunt. She lacks proper etiquette and ladylike demeanor, but is smart and astute.

=== Supporting cast ===
- Li Yunrui as Yuan Shen / Shanjian

Huangfu Yi's disciple and the best student of the Bailu Mountain Academy. Due to his parents unhappy marriage, he has grown up to be an arrogant and jaded young master.

- Yu Chengen as Lou Yao

The timid second son of the second branch of the Lou family and He Zhaojun's childhood fiancé.

- Estelle Chen as He Zhaojun

The spoiled youngest daughter of General He and Lou Yao's childhood fiancée.

- Zhang Yue as Wan Qiqi

The daughter of General Wan and Cheng Shaoshang's close friend. Having accompanied her father to the battlefield, she is adept at martial arts.

- Cui Enci as Commandery Princess Yuchang

The granddaughter of the Prince of Ruyang, who has been enamored with Ling Buyi since childhood.

Cheng family

- Guo Tao as Cheng Shi, Marquis of Quling

Cheng Shaoshang's loving father and a respected military commander.

- Zeng Li as Xiao Yuanyi

Cheng Shaoshang's mother and a strict matriarch who has accompanied her husband to the battlefield.

- Xu Jiao as Cheng Yang / Yangyang

Cheng Shaoshang's cousin. She has grown up in her maternal grandparents' household and has a ladylike personality.

- Xu Di as Old Madame Cheng

Cheng Shaoshang's greedy and vulgar grandmother.

- Mickey Zhao as Cheng Shaogong

Cheng Shaoshang's twin brother.

- Jiang Yiming as Cheng Song

Cheng Shaoshang's second brother.

- Zhang Tianyang as Cheng Zhi

Cheng Shaoshang's third uncle.

- Peng Yang as Sang Shunhua

Cheng Zhi's kind and loving wife.

- Cui Peng as Cheng Cheng

Cheng Yang's father and Cheng Shaoshang's second uncle. He is a cripple who is often bullied by his wife.

- Chen Sisi as Lady Ge

Cheng Yang's mother and Cheng Cheng's scheming wife.

Imperial Family

- Bao Jianfeng as Emperor Wen

A benevolent and just ruler who favors Ling Buyi over his own children. Ling Buyi's maternal uncle, General Huo Chong, was a confidante who assisted him in establishing the dynasty.

- Tong Lei as Empress Xuan

The kind and meek empress who becomes a maternal figure to Cheng Shaoshang. She is the foster daughter of the Prince of Xian'an and mother of the Crown Prince and Fifth Princess.

- Cao Xiwen as Consort Yue

Emperor Wen's childhood sweetheart and first wife, and mother of the Second Princess, Third Prince and Third Princess. She is an upright and impartial matriarch who wants to lead a peaceful life.

- Wang Zhuocheng as Crown Prince Yuan

Empress Xuan's son. He is considered too soft-hearted and weak-willed to be able to lead the country.

- Wang Ziwei as Fifth Princess

Empress Xuan's daughter. She has been spoiled and pampered due to being the only child born to Emperor Wen after the establishment of the current dynasty.

- Gao Han as Third Prince

Consort Yue's son. Ambitious and decisive, he is often referred to as the rightful heir.

- Wang Zhen as Third Princess

Consort Yue's daughter. She grew up under Marquis Yue's tutelage and prioritises wealth and prestige.

- Kobe Liu as Fifth Prince

Emperor Wen's son by a maid. He is a playboy considered unfit to help with any state affairs.

Ling family

- Sha Baoliang as Ling Yi, Marquis of Chengyang

Ling Buyi's father and the former husband of Huo Junhua.

- Candy Zhang as Huo Junhua

Ling Buyi's mother and the sister of General Huo Chong. She became mentally unstable after the massacre of Gu City.

- Zhao Ziqi as Lady Chunyu

Ling Buyi's stepmother. She took advantage of Huo Junhua's absence to begin an affair with her cousin, Ling Yi, and eventually married him.

Others

- Fang Xiaoli as Princess Consort of Ruyang

Commandery Princess Yuchang's grandmother. Her husband is Emperor Wen's paternal uncle.

- Zhang Chen as Liang Qiuqi

Ling Buyi's subordinate.

- Sun Kai as Liang Qiufei

Ling Buyi's subordinate.

- Wang Yajia as Liangfang

Cheng Shaoshang's personal maid and confidant.

- Hu Jiaxin as Wang Ling

Empress Xuan's niece.

- Melody Tang as Lou Li

Lou Yao's cousin and the daughter of the first branch of the Lou family.

== Original soundtrack ==
=== Mainland China ===
Original soundtrack
No.	Title	Lyrics	Music	Artists	Length
1.	"Love Like the Galaxy" (Theme & ending song)	Liu Chang	Tian Jingjing	Shan Yichun
2.	"String Song" (Ling Buyi's character theme song)	Duan Sisi	Tan Xuan	Ayanga
3.	"Star River Sigh" (Cheng Shaoshang's character theme song)	Wang Ziyan	Guan Dazhou	Huang Ling
4.	"Happy Like Me" (Yuan Shen's character theme song)	Liao Yu	He Huihui; Wang Zitong	Li Yunrui
5.	"Fuxi"	Guan Dazhou	Guan Dazhou	Yeri

== Reception ==
The highest single-day streaming viewership of the first part of Love Like the Galaxy exceeded 200 million views.

As of August 2, 2022, the second part of the series had a single-day streaming viewership of 300 million views.
