= Hidden Love =

2023 Chinese television series

- Promotional poster
- Also known as: Secretly, Secretly; But Unable to Hide It
- Simplified Chinese: 偷偷藏不住
- Genre: Romance; Youth
- Based on: Secretly, Secretly; But Unable to Hide It by Zhu Yi
- Written by: Zhu Yi
- Screenplay by: Shen Fei Xian (沈飞弦)
- Directed by: Lee Ching Jung
- Starring: Zhao Lusi; Chen Zheyuan
- Opening theme: 只想把你偷偷藏好 (Just Want To Secretly Hide You)
- Country of origin: China
- Original language: Mandarin
- No. of episodes: 25

Production
- Production locations: Xiamen, China
- Running time: 45 minutes
- Production company: Youku

Original release
- Network: Youku
- Release: 20 June – 6 July 2023

Related
- Hidden Love Special; The First Frost

Hidden Love (Chinese: 偷偷藏不住) is a 2023 Chinese television drama starring Zhao Lusi and Chen Zheyuan. It is based on the Chinese web novel Secretly, Secretly; But Unable to Hide It by Zhu Yi. The series aired on Youku from June 20 until July 6, 2023 and on Netflix, starting from June 29, 2023.

== Synopsis ==
The series revolves around the life of Sang Zhi (Zhao Lusi), a young girl who develops a crush on Duan Jiaxu (Chen Zheyuan), who happens to be her older brother Sang Yan's (Victor Ma) best friend. Despite the initial infatuation, their relationship takes a natural progression as time passes. As the story unfolds, Sang Zhi's feelings for Duan Jiaxu deepen, transcending her initial crush and blossoming into genuine love.

== Cast and characters ==
=== Main ===
- Zhao Lusi as Sang Zhi
  - Zhang Xi Wei as young Sang Zhi
  - Nicknamed "Zhizhi". Sang Yan's younger sister and Duan Jiaxu's love interest. She likes drawing and eating crispy duck with taro paste. When she was in 8th grade, she mistook Duan Jiaxu for her brother for a moment. She then asked Duan Jiaxu to pose as her brother to go to see the teacher instead of her parents. The difference in age between the two is 5 years. Later, when Sang Zhi was in high school, she gradually fell in love with Duan Jiaxu. She misunderstood that Duan Jiaxu had a girlfriend, so she tried hard to forget him. She later went to Yihe University and met Duan Jiaxu again, and they eventually became a couple.
- Chen Zheyuan as Duan Jiaxu
  - Sang Yan's college roommate and Sang Zhi's love interest. His dream was to become a video game designer. Because of his father's hospitalization, he started working part-time to earn money when he was a university student in Nanwu, Sang Yan and Sang Zhi's hometown. When Sang Zhi was in high school, he tutored her in physics. After graduating, he returned to Yihe to work and lost contact with Sang Zhi. Two years later, he reunited with Sang Zhi in Yihe, where she was attending university. As he grew closer to Sang Zhi, he slowly developed feelings for Sang Zhi.
- Victor Ma as Sang Yan
  - Sang Zhi's elder brother, with a sharp tongue and a tofu heart. He and Duan Jiaxu were college roommates and are close friends. He is supportive of Sang Zhi, though the two bicker often. He is five years older than Sang Zhi.

=== People around Sang Zhi ===
- Zeng Li as Li Ping
  - Sang Zhi and Sang Yan's mother.
- Qiu Xinzhi as Sang Rong
  - Sang Zhi and Sang Yan's father.
- Wei Xiao as Ning Wei
  - Sang Zhi's college roommate. A vlogger with a lively personality. Chen Qiang's girlfriend.
- Qi Tianqing as Yu Xin
  - Sang Zhi's college roommate who is a career oriented girl and has a passion for gaming.
- Wang Yilan as Wang Ruolan
  - Sang Zhi's college roommate. A conservative and not very confident girl who has a crush on Jiang Ming.
- Gu Shuqi as Yin Zhenru
  - Sang Zhi's middle school and high school classmate. Later transferred to another school.
- Zhang Jiongmin as Fu Zhengchu
  - Gao Lin Yu as young Fu Zhenchu
  - Sang Zhi's middle school and high school classmate. He liked Sang Zhi.
- Lu Dongxu as Jiang Ming
  - A student in the Department of Physical Education who liked Sang Zhi.
- Song Peize as Chen Qiang
  - Jiang Ming's college classmate and Ning Wei's boyfriend.
- Xu Shiyue as Shi Xiaoyu
  - Jiang Ying's friend. Sang Zhi's boss in internship company who mistook her for robbing Jiang Ying's boyfriend and disliked her everywhere.

=== People around Duan Jiaxu ===
- Li Jia Wei as Xu Ruoshu
  - Duan Jiaxu's mother.
- Wang Wei Hua as Duan Zhi Cheng
  - Duan Jiaxu's father. He's in a coma after falling from a terrace. He killed Jiang Ying's father in traffic accident after driving drunk.
- Guan Zijing as Li Xun
  - Duan Jiaxu's colleague. Jiang Siyun's husband.
- Wang Yang as Jiang Si Yun
  - Duan Jiaxu's boss. Li Xun's wife. Sang Zhi mistook her for Duan Jiaxu's girlfriend.
- Zhang Haolun as Chen Junwen
  - Duan Jiaxu and Sang Yan's college roommate.
- Hu Yuxuan as Qian Fei
  - Duan Jiaxu's college roommate. He was the first of the four roommates to get married.
- Xu Shixin as Jiang Ying
  - Duan Jiaxu's high school classmate, whose father was killed in a traffic accident caused by Duan Jiaxu's father. She has an obsession with Duan Jiaxu. Over the years, she has troubled Duan Jiaxu persistently and was later warned and persuaded to stop bothering him. At one point, she even slandered Sang Zhi, falsely claiming she stole Duan Jiaxu from her.

=== Others ===
- Wang Yi Tian as Xiao Taimei
- Chang Hai Bo as Chen Mingxu
- Ji Hao as Jia Yang
- Guo Zi Xin as Zhang Hui
- Zhang Bo as Zhang Sen
- Wang Sheng Yun as Wan Zhe

== Original soundtrack ==
No.	Title	Singer	Length
1.	"I Just Want to Hide You Secretly" (opening theme)	Wang Sulong, Zhao Lusi
2.	"I Have Someone I Like (我有喜欢的人了)"	Zhao Lusi
3.	"Be Your Light"	Ma Boqian
4.	"You Are My Only Wish"	Zhang Bichen
5.	"Have You"	Zhao Lei
6.	"The Star Thief"	Yi Hui
7.	"Forever Star"	Zhang Weihao

== Reception ==
=== Critical response ===
Ayushi Agrawal of Pinkvilla wrote "the shows vibrant storyline, along with the well-crafted characters, undoubtedly played a pivotal role in the show's success, and it successfully delivered a romance narrative celebrated for its simplicity and relatability, gracefully navigating the age gap without causing discomfort". India Today stated "netizens are hooked on the mushy Chinese drama with positive reviews", adding: "It is on the trending list of shows in several countries and it seems certain that after the popularity of K-dramas, Chinese dramas are all set to become the next big thing".

== Other media ==
The novel the series was based on was licensed on English by Seven Seas Entertainment.
