= Go Go Squid 2: Dt. Appledog's Time =

Chinese streaming television series

- Simplified Chinese: 我的时代，你的时代
- Hanyu Pinyin: wǒde shídài, nǐde shídài
- Genre: Romance; Youth
- Based on: Fish Playing While Trapped in a Secret Room (密室困游鱼)
- Written by: Mo Bao Fei Bao
- Directed by: Yu ZhongZhong
- Starring: Hu Yitian; Li Yitong
- Country of origin: China
- Original language: Mandarin
- No. of episodes: 38

Production
- Running time: Varies per episode
- Production company: 上海剧酷

Original release
- Network: iQiyi
- Release: February 4, 2021

Go Go Squid 2: Dt. Appledog's Time (Chinese: 我的时代，你的时代; pinyin: wǒde shídài, nǐde shídài) is a 2021 Chinese streaming television series that premiered on iQiyi on February 4, which tells a story of Wu Bai and Ai Qing who mesmerized by each other during and directed their team together to win the world championship for China.

It is directed by Yu ZhongZhong, and features an ensemble cast that includes Hu Yitian, Li Yitong, Marcus Li, Xu Lewei, Wang Anyu and Nina Wang, with special guest Yang Zi and Li Xian. The series was adapted from Mo Bao Fei Bao's novel, Fish Playing While Trapped in a Secret Room (密室困游鱼).

== Plot ==
Wu Bai has become the youngest surprise winner in the National Robot Competition with his unremitting efforts and talent. He formed a team to go for the contest and finally competed against his enlightenment Ai Qing in finals in China. Since then, they have gained many honors on behalf of their motherland. They both are determined to promote technological robots among Chinese youth, thereby making China more robust through science and technology. They are mesmerized by each other during and directed their team together to win the world championship for China.

== Cast ==
Main

- Hu Yitian as Wu Bai (DT)
- Li Yitong as Ai Qing (Appledog)(Doggy)

Team K&K

- Xu Yao as Mi Shaofei (Xiao Mi)
- Wang Anyu as Shen Zhe (Grunt)
- Li Mingde as Ling Shan (97)
- Xu Lexiao as Zhou Yi (One)

Team SP

- Pang Hanchen as Wang Hao (Solo)
- Xu Yang as Zhou Hua (Hua Ti)
- Liu Shuai as Ou Qiang (All)

Guest appearance

- Yang Zi as Tong Nian (Little Squid)
- Li Xian as Han Shang Yan (Gun)
