= The Last Immortal =

2023 Chinese television series

- Official Poster
- Simplified Chinese: 神隐
- Genre: Xianxia; Fantasy; Romance
- Based on: Hidden God by Xing Ling
- Written by: Liu Fang, Li Huimin, Cheng Yu, Wang Wei, Chen Qunxing, Liu Linqing
- Directed by: Chen Jialin
- Starring: Zhao Lusi; Wang Anyu
- Opening theme: "Hidden Heart" by Zhao Lusi
- Ending theme: "Flower Wish" by Wang Anyu
- Country of origin: China
- Original language: Mandarin
- No. of seasons: 1
- No. of episodes: 40

Production
- Executive producers: Yang Xiaopei; Huang Jie; Li Liming; Wang Juan; Liang Deping; Wan Lin; Zhang Zhi Hong; Luo Zejun; Lu Haibo; Yang Huaidong
- Production location: Hengdian World Studios
- Running time: 40 min
- Production companies: Tencent Penguin Pictures; Xixi Pictures; YinheKuyu Media; Xinbaoyuan Movies

Original release
- Network: Tencent Video; Mango TV
- Release: December 11, 2023 – January 4, 2024

Related
- Ancient Love Poetry

The Last Immortal (Chinese: 神隐) is a Chinese television series based on the web novel Hidden God by Xing Ling, starring Zhao Lusi and Wang Anyu. It is the spin-off of the 2021 drama series Ancient Love Poetry. The series aired on Tencent Video and Mango TV on December 11, 2023.

== Synopsis ==
Ayin, a divine water beast and Gu Jin, the son of the true gods whose divine power was sealed, met by accident and embarked on the road to find next Phoenix Queen Feng Yin's immortal essence. Accompanied by Demon Realms' Fox prince Hongyi and Princess Yan Shuang of the Eagle clan, they work together to maintain peace in the world and grow together.

== Cast and characters ==
=== Main ===
- Zhao Lusi as Ayin / Feng Yin
  - Ayin: A divine water beast with healing powers.
  - Feng Yin: One of the two Fire Phoenixes. The next Queen of Wutong Island and Phoenix clan.
- Wang Anyu as Gu Jin / Yuan Qi

The son of the two true gods' Shang Gu and Bai Jue whose powers were sealed. He was sent to Daze Mountain to cultivate.

- Li Yunrui as Hong Yi / Ajiu

Prince of Fox clan and Ten-tailed heavenly fox.

- Jia Nai as Yan Shuang

Princess of Eagle Clan and Chief of 'Hall of Arms'.

- Cao Feiran as Hua Shu

Princess of Peacock Clan later the acting Heavenly Emperor.

=== Supporting ===
Immortal Realm

Phoenix Clan

- Xue Jianing as Feng Yuan

Heavenly Emperor and current Phoenix Queen. Feng Yin's teacher and Shang Gu's close friend

- Xu Ke as Feng Ming

Elder of Phoenix Clan. He aspires to be the next Phoenix King.

- Gong Wanyi as Feng Huan

Elder of Phoenix Clan.

- Sun Wei as Feng Yun

Elder of Phoenix Clan.

- Xu Shiyue as Feng Chi

Former Queen of Phoenix Clan and Wu Gui's lover

Heavenly Palace

- Cui Hang as Lan Feng

Acting Heavenly Emperor.

- Chen Yutong as Yu Feng

One of the five lords. Chief of Si Feng Palace.

- Han Shuai as Jing Lei

One of the five lords

- Yuan Hangming as Yan Huo

One of the five lords

- Liu Hanyang as Ling Dian

One of the five lords

Si Bing Hall

- Gong Zhengnan as Fu Chenjian

Deputy Chief of Si Bing Hall

- Wang Erduo as Bao Hulu, heavenly weapon
- Liu Jiaxi as Mie Chanu, heavenly weapon
- Wang Kuangyu as Mie Xuren, heavenly weapon

Daze Mountain

- Yang Dezhan as Dong Hua

Chief of Daze Mountain who later ascends to Godhood

- Qiu Bohao as Xian Shan

Senior disciple of Daze mountain and later the Chief of Daze Mountain

- Sun Yi as Xian Zhu

Second disciple of Daze Mountain

- Huo Zhengyan as Qing Yun

Disciple of Da Ze Mountain

- Xu Lingchen as Qing Yi

Disciple of Xian Shan

Qing Chi Palace

- Zhou Zhi as Hong Chou

Acting Chief of Qing Chi Palace

- Li Fancheng as Yuan Shen Sword

Peacock Clan

- Zheng Guo Lin as Hua Mo, King of Peacock Clan
- Huai Wen as Hua Yan, Eldest Prince of Peacock Clan
- Feng Yi Ran as Hong Que, Hua Shu's attendant

Eagle Clan

- Wang Li as Yan Qiu, King of Eagle Clan
- Niu Zhi Qiang as Yan Shuang's uncle

Demon Realm

Fox Clan

- Ying Er as Hong Ruo

Queen of Fox Clan and Hong Yi's aunt

- Dong Xiaobai as Hong Mei, one of the four elders of Fox Clan
- Xu Shuai as Hong Huo

Tiger Clan

- Zhang Haocheng as Lin Sen, King of Tiger Clan
- Wang Zirui as Lin Mo

Second prince of Tiger Clan and Hong Ruo's former lover

Others

- Qi Peixin as Bi Bo, a divine water beast
- Feng Mingjing as San Shouhuo Long, guardian of Zi Yue Mountain
- He Lei as Wu Gui, guardian spirit of Parasol tree at Jingyou Valley and Feng Chi's former lover

Devil Realm

- Liu Li as Qing Lin

Queen of Devil realm and a nine-tailed Fox demon who turned evil due to her unreciprocated love toward Lin Mo

- Ou Mide as Zhuo Yinglun, Qing Lin's subordinate

Nether Realm

- He Kailang as Ao Ge / Xiu Yan
  - Ao Ge: Ruler of Nether Realm
  - Xiu Yan: Twin brother of Ao Ge and owner of Xiu Yan Tower
- Huang Riying as San Shengshi / Three Lives Stone

==== Others ====
- Ning Jia as Wan Yue, Xian Zhu's lover
- Fan Jingwen as Ayu, A divine water beast and Ayin's younger sister
- Zhang Yijun as Princess Chen Min

Guardian of Gui Xu Mountain and Daughter of previous Heavenly Emperor

- Gao Ji Cai as Ling Feng

Young master of Wan Yi Mountain

- Wang Jun Ren as Lian Yue, disciple of Kunlun Mountain
- He Congrui as Lei Che, disciple of Lei Ze Mountain
- Zhong Wenguan as Bi Yun, Ling Feng's fiancée

== Soundtrack ==
No.	English title	Chinese title	Artist	Notes
1.	"Greedy"	贪盼	Silence Wang	
2.	"Hidden Heart"	隐心	Zhao Lusi	Opening theme song
3.	"Flower Wish"	花愿	Wang Anyu	Ending theme song
4.	"Not Ended"	未央	Huang Ling	
5.	"Love Like This"	爱如此	Huang Xiaoyun	
6.	"Mountain Moon Ferry"	山月渡	Duan Aojuan	
7.	"Kill Those Heart Matters"	刹那心事	Wang Jiacheng	
8.	"Obsession"	执妄	Yang Zixiao	
