= Handsome Siblings (TV series) =

2020 Chinese wuxia television series

- Promotional poster
- 绝代双骄
- Genre: Wuxia
- Based on: Juedai Shuangjiao by Gu Long
- Written by: Wang Zixi; Yu Hailin; Ma Ming; Zhong Jing
- Directed by: Zou Jicheng; Liu Fang
- Starring: Chen Zheyuan; Hu Yitian
- Country of origin: China
- Original language: Mandarin
- No. of episodes: 44

Production
- Production location: China

Original release
- Network: CCTV-8; iQIYI; Netflix
- Release: 16 January 2020

Handsome Siblings (绝代双骄) is a 2020 Chinese wuxia television series based on the novel Juedai Shuangjiao by Gu Long. It aired on both CCTV and Netflix.

== Synopsis ==
The story follows a pair of twin brothers who were separated at birth and raised to be enemies. Jiang Xiaoyuer is trained by five of the "Ten Great Villains", who want him to be the greatest villain of all time in the jianghu. Hua Wuque is taken to Yihua Palace by Yaoyue and Lianxing, who kidnap him shortly after birth. He is raised to be righteous and to handle situations that arise in the jianghu.

Once his training is complete, Hua Wuque is ordered to leave Yihua Palace, find and kill Xiaoyuer, and not return until he has completed his mission. Along the way, Xiaoyuer and Hua Wuque befriend each other, and decide to work together to stop the jianghu from falling into chaos.

== Cast ==
- Chen Zheyuan as Xiaoyuer
  - Pei Wenbo as Xiaoyuer (child)
- Hu Yitian as Hua Wuque / Jiang Feng
  - Wei Zhihao as Hua Wuque (child)
- Vicky Liang as Tie Xinlan
- Liang Jie as Su Ying
- Tay Ping Hui as Lu Zhongyuan
- Gallen Lo as Jiang Biehe
  - Gong Junze as Jiang Biehe (child)
- Zhou Junchao as Jiang Yulang
- Shao Yun as Murong Jiu
- Wang Zhen as Zhang Jing
- Song Wenzuo as Heizhizhu
- Zhou Bin as Gu Renyu
- Mao Linlin as Yaoyue
- Meng Li as Lianxing
- Zhao Yingzi as Hua Yuenu
- Jiang Yuan as Tie Pinggu
- Hou Changrong as Wan Chunliu
- Sun Jiaolong as Du Sha
- Jill Hsu as Tu Jiaojiao
- Liu Weisen as Hahaer
- Li Jianren as Li Dazui
- Song Yuan as Yin Jiuyou
- Marco Lee as Tie Zhan
- Jin Song as Xuanyuan Sanguang
- Zhang Xuan as Xiao Mimi
- Liu Wei as Bai Kaixin
- Yan Wei as Ouyang Ding
- Yan Ming as Ouyang Dang
- Luo Xuan as Murong Shuang
- Lai Yi as Nangong Liu
- Zhou Zixin as Murong Shanshan
- Han Shuo as Qin Jian
- Li Ming as Wei Wuya
- Kou Zhanwen as Huang Niu
- Yin Junzheng as Bai Shanjun
- Hai Yang as Hu Yaoshi
- Gao Yuqing as Bishe Shenjun
- Zheng Qingwen as Ma Taxue
- Huang Fei as Bai Yang
- Wang Xingyi as Jin Yuanxing
- Zhou Jiwei as Sichenke
- Zhao Qiusheng as Heiquanxing
- Lin Yizheng as Heimianjun
- Chen Zhihui as Tie Wushuang

== Reception ==
Handsome Siblings received generally positive reviews, scoring 7.8 based on 826 users on IMDb as of July 2024. Stephen McCarty of the South China Morning Post's Post Magazine noted that despite the story being adapted multiple times, this rendition was a "visual feast" and compared it to "Cirque du Soleil meets Journey to the West".

== Broadcasts and streaming ==
=== Broadcasts ===
Region	Network	Dates
Mainland China	CCTV-8	2020 January 16 - 2020 February 7

=== Streaming ===
Region	Network	Release date
Mainland China	iQIYI	2020 January 16
Taiwan	iQIYI Taiwan	2020 January 16
Overseas	Netflix	2020 January 16
