= Twenty Your Life On 2 =

Chinese television drama

- Promotional poster
- Simplified Chinese: 二十不惑2
- Hanyu Pinyin: Èrshí bùhuò 2
- Genre: Romance
- Written by: Zhang Wuju; Zhong Enshu; Han Santai; Lu Shisanfeng
- Directed by: Li Zhi
- Starring: Guan Xiaotong; Bu Guanjin; Dong Siyi; Xu Mengjie
- Country of origin: China
- Original language: Mandarin
- No. of episodes: 40

Production
- Producer: Xu Xiao Ou
- Production location: Shenzhen, China
- Running time: 45 minutes
- Production companies: Linmon Pictures; iQIYI

Original release
- Network: Hunan Television; Mango TV; iQIYI; Netflix
- Release: 17 August – 12 September 2022

Related
- Twenty Your Life On

Twenty Your Life On 2 (Chinese: 二十不惑2; pinyin: Èrshí bùhuò 2) is a 2022 Chinese television drama starring Guan Xiaotong, Bu Guanjin, Dong Siyi and Xu Mengjie. It is the sequel to the 2020 series Twenty Your Life On. It aired on Hunan Television's Mondays to Saturdays at 20:30 (CST) time slot from August 17 until September 12, 2022.

== Synopsis ==
Three years have gone by since college, and the four best friends are met with a new set of challenges as they enter a different stage of adulthood.

== Cast ==
=== Main ===
- Guan Xiaotong as Liang Shuang

The top beauty and skin care live streamer, but her career has ups and downs. After graduating from college, she chose a job she liked.

- Bu Guanjin as Jiang Xiaoguo

In order to successfully find a job, she started her internship early. She later regained her original intention, and continued to work hard to improve herself.

- Dong Siyi as Duan Jiabao

A second-generation rich girl, from a businessman's family, she lives well, and has a simple mind and dreams. But all of a sudden her family economic crisis turned her from a "rich second generation" to a "negative second generation."

- Xu Mengjie as Ding Yixuan

The new roommate who is a woman full of warmth and indifference to the world. She is an amateur writer and aspires to be a famous one. She also work in the front desk of the pet hospital.

- Li Gengxi as Luo Yan

She is keen on playing games and reading comics. She entered a traditional company not far from home to work as a freelancer. Later on, she went to abroad to pursue her comics dream.

- Fei Qiming as Xi Song

Jiang Xiaoguo's classmate and colleague.

- Xie Binbin as Zu Zhouchen

Veterinarian from Ding Yixuan's pet hospital.

- Zhou Yiran as Yin Shang

Rookie actor from Duan Jiabo's company. He dreams of becoming a well-known actor.

- Li Shen as Jiang Lanzhou

The boss of the company where Liang Shuang work.

=== Supporting ===
==== People around Liang Shuang ====
- Xu Xiaosa as CEO Wang
- Li Wenling as Grandmother Liang
- Liu Pizhong as Father Liang
- Zhu Ran as Jiang Shuai
- Cui Jingge as Lili Ya

==== People around Jiang Xiaoguo ====
- Wei Wei as Alex
- Cao Zheng as Kris
- Xu Nannan as Sister Wang
- Yi Wang as Charles

==== People around Duan Jiabao ====
- Jiang Linyan as Mother Duan
- Wang Anyu as Duan Zhenyu

==== People around Ding Yixuan ====
- Zhou Xianxin as Mother Ding
- Yu Hongzhou as Father Ding
- Liu Shuai Liang as Wei Jinnan

== Episodes ==
No.	Title	Directed by	Written by	Original release date
1	"Episode 1"	Li Zhi	Zhang Wuju & Zhong Enshu	August 17, 2022
Three years after college, four besties plan to gather for birthday dinner. But the long-awaited reunion is interrupted by their hectic grown-up life.
2	"Episode 2"	Li Zhi	Zhang Wuju & Zhong Enshu	August 17, 2022
With friends' help, Lou Yan stands up against her workplace bully. Liang Shuang stumbles upon an ingenious idea in her livestreaming business.
3	"Episode 3"	Li Zhi	Zhang Wuju & Zhong Enshu	August 17, 2022
Liang Shuang, Duan Jiabao and Jiang Xiaoguo uncover a special gift left by their best friend, who is already on a harrowing journey abroad.
4	"Episode 4"	Li Zhi	Zhang Wuju & Zhong Enshu	August 17, 2022
Liang Shuang manages to impress a resourceful executive but leaves her boyfriend feeling neglected. A new roommate enters Xiaoguo and Jiabao's life.
5	"Episode 5"	Li Zhi	Zhang Wuju & Zhong Enshu	August 17, 2022
Xiaoguo labors to get a coveted manager role, but she struggles to stay ahead against her competitors: an innovative newcomer and a former mentor.
6	"Episode 6"	Li Zhi	Zhang Wuju & Zhong Enshu	August 17, 2022
Thrown off by Yin Shang's surprise announcement, Jiabao scrambles to control the damage. Zhao Youxiu brings up a heartbreaking proposal.
7	"Episode 7"	Li Zhi	Zhang Wuju & Zhong Enshu	August 18, 2022
Freshly wounded, Liang Shuang powers through her pain for a major live event. One disaster after another shatters Jiabao's entrepreneurial spirit.
8	"Episode 8"	Li Zhi	Zhang Wuju & Zhong Enshu	August 18, 2022
After a costly mistake, Liang Shuang makes a bold plan to remedy the loss. Ding Yixuan draws inspiration from her colleagues to write web fiction.
9	"Episode 9"	Li Zhi	Zhang Wuju & Zhong Enshu	August 19, 2022
A deflated Jiabao takes a round of intense job interviews. As Xiaoguo racks her brain for marketing ideas, she finds comfort in a bubbly colleague.
10	"Episode 10"	Li Zhi	Zhang Wuju & Zhong Enshu	August 20, 2022
Teamed up with Qi Song, Xiaoguo takes one last to impress Mr. Omori. Liang Shuang is hit by a series of scathing accusations.
11	"Episode 11"	Li Zhi	Zhang Wuju & Zhong Enshu	August 22, 2022
Engulfed in an online scandal, Liang Shuang scrambles to fight a massive PR crisis. Meanwhile Xiaoguo and Qi Song face growing pressure at work.
12	"Episode 12"	Li Zhi	Zhang Wuju & Zhong Enshu	August 22, 2022
Jiabao's fight to survive probation leads her to visit an old pal. To cheer up Liang Shuang, her friends came together for a birthday dinner.
13	"Episode 13"	Li Zhi	Zhang Wuju & Zhong Enshu	August 23, 2022
Jiabao's creativity scores her an impressive deal. Liang Shuang and Zhao Yuoxiu have a heart-to-heart exchange about their future.
14	"Episode 14"	Li Zhi	Zhang Wuju & Zhong Enshu	August 23, 2022
After overcoming their differences, Xiaoguo and Qi Song find a way to work with each other. Liang Shuang, newly unemployed, searches for her next gig.
15	"Episode 15"	Li Zhi	Zhang Wuju & Zhong Enshu	August 24, 2022
Unexpectedly, a photoshoot brings Yixuan and Zhouchen closer. Once a top livestreamer, Liang Shuang must rebuild her career from scratch.
16	"Episode 16"	Li Zhi	Zhang Wuju & Zhong Enshu	August 24, 2022
Taking a friend's advice, Liang Shuang embraces a style makeover. Qi Song and Xiaoguo's differences in work philosophy is widen.
17	"Episode 17"	Li Zhi	Zhang Wuju & Zhong Enshu	August 25, 2022
Wary about colleague's integrity, Liang Shuang speaks up and becomes a target at work. Zhu Zhouchen surprisingly discovers himself in a fan fiction.
18	"Episode 18"	Li Zhi	Zhang Wuju & Zhong Enshu	August 25, 2022
A family reunion test Jiabao's financial situation. Xiaoguo and Qi Song find out the true reason behind the failure of their project.
19	"Episode 19"	Li Zhi	Zhang Wuju & Zhong Enshu	August 26, 2022
Ding Yixuan musters her courage to ask out Dr. Zhu, but a colleague stands in her way. Jiabao receives a gift that ends up being a massive headache.
20	"Episode 20"	Li Zhi	Zhang Wuju & Zhong Enshu	August 27, 2022
A change in Liang Shuang's company gives her a shot at a comeback, and Xiaoguo is invited to a fancy social event that makes her feel uncomfortable.
21	"Episode 21"	Li Zhi	Zhang Wuju & Zhong Enshu	August 29, 2022
Yixuan takes care of Dr. Zhu after his eye surgery and accidentally reveals her feelings. Jiabao and Yin Shang bond over their similar upbringing.
22	"Episode 22"	Li Zhi	Zhang Wuju & Zhong Enshu	August 29, 2022
Reeling from her recent misstep, Liang Shuang tries to find a way to alleviate her stress. A revelation at work leaves Xiaoguo in utter shock.
23	"Episode 23"	Li Zhi	Zhang Wuju & Zhong Enshu	August 30, 2022
Xiaoguo, furious and uninhibited, confronts Chris at his send-off party. An impromptu livestreaming makes Liang Shuang a breakout star.
24	"Episode 24"	Li Zhi	Zhang Wuju & Zhong Enshu	August 30, 2022
Xiaoguo's outburst lands her an unexpected opportunity. Meanwhile, Liang Shuang seeks a new streaming partner for an important event.
25	"Episode 25"	Li Zhi	Zhang Wuju & Zhong Enshu	August 31, 2022
Jiabao has a heart-to-heart talk with Zhenyu about their family's financial situation. Xiaoguo begins to re-evaluate her life goals.
26	"Episode 26"	Li Zhi	Zhang Wuju & Zhong Enshu	August 31, 2022
A birthday gift sends Xiaoguo to revisit her teenage years. Arriving at a new city, Yin Shang begins to miss a dear friend.
27	"Episode 27"	Li Zhi	Zhang Wuju & Zhong Enshu	September 1, 2022
With a hard-earned promotion, Liang Shuang moves to a new office and faces different challenges. Xiaoguo visits Qi Song at his new firm.
28	"Episode 28"	Li Zhi	Zhang Wuju & Zhong Enshu	September 1, 2022
Xiaoguo takes notice of her budding feelings for Qi Song. Meanwhile, Liang Shuang challenges the rampant plagiarism problem at work.
29	"Episode 29"	Li Zhi	Zhang Wuju & Zhong Enshu	September 2, 2022
With the new collaboration in the works, Qi Song and Xiaoguo's bond grow deeper. Liang Shuang comes up with an idea to boost morale at work.
30	"Episode 30"	Li Zhi	Zhang Wuju & Zhong Enshu	September 3, 2022
With the help of Yin Shang, Jiabao makes a future plan for her parents. Meanwhile, Liang Shuang's success usher in an old foe.
31	"Episode 31"	Li Zhi	Zhang Wuju & Zhong Enshu	September 5, 2022
Xiaoguo is impressed by Qi Song's newfound endeavour. Soon after, three best friends put Yin Shang under scrutiny about his feelings for Jiabao.
32	"Episode 32"	Li Zhi	Zhang Wuju & Zhong Enshu	September 5, 2022
Inspired by Qi Song, Xiaoguo gathers up courage to step out of her comfort zone. At work, a tough internal competition looms over Liang Shuang's team.
33	"Episode 33"	Li Zhi	Zhang Wuju & Zhong Enshu	September 6, 2022
An honest talk with Liang Shuang leaves Jiang Lanzhou pondering about their history. With Yin Shang's help, Jiabao goes on a debt collecting trip.
34	"Episode 34"	Li Zhi	Zhang Wuju & Zhong Enshu	September 6, 2022
A haircut causes a fight between Ding Yixuan and Zhu Zhouchen. Xiaguo and her boss disagree on the investment strategy over Qi Song's startup.
35	"Episode 35"	Li Zhi	Zhang Wuju & Zhong Enshu	September 7, 2022
A hard-earned promotion unwittingly stirs up some second thoughts for Liang Shuang. A jealous Jiang Lanzhou reveals his feelings at a ring toss game.
36	"Episode 36"	Li Zhi	Zhang Wuju & Zhong Enshu	September 7, 2022
An unplanned reunion with a former crush wreaks havoc in Xiaoguo's life. Jiabao's stubborn dad gets involved in risky business.
37	"Episode 37"	Li Zhi	Zhang Wuju & Zhong Enshu	September 8, 2022
Liang Shuang raises a bold idea to her supplier. As Xiaoguo and Qi Song's project matures, an abrupt phone call draws Xiaoguo into a family emergency.
38	"Episode 38"	Li Zhi	Zhang Wuju & Zhong Enshu	September 9, 2022
A sudden announcement from Jiabao stuns her best friends. Xiaoguo's mother spills the beans about a new romance in her life.
39	"Episode 39"	Li Zhi	Zhang Wuju & Zhong Enshu	September 12, 2022
At work, Jiang Lanzhou struggles to accept Liang Shuang's resignation. Meanwhile, Xiaoguo finds herself torn between two crushes.
40	"Episode 40"	Li Zhi	Zhang Wuju & Zhong Enshu	September 12, 2022
Jiang Lanzhou gets a crash course on how to court Liang Shuang. Another birthday marks the best friends' next life chapter.

== Production ==
On September 10, 2020, Linmon Pictures released the 2021 episode list on its official Weibo account, and announced that there will be another season.

On July 16, 2022, the drama obtained a distribution license allowing the series to be broadcast. The following month it was announced that the play will premiere on August 17, 2022 on Hunan Television, and will also be available on online streaming such as iQIYI, Mango TV and Netflix.

== Original soundtrack ==
Twenty Your Life On 2 OST Album

Soundtrack album by Various artists
- Released: 2022
- Studio: Linmon Pictures
- Genre: Soundtrack
- Length: 19:29
- Language: Chinese
- Producer: Hu Xiaoou

=== Twenty Your Life On 2: Original soundtrack ===
Twenty Your Life On 2 : Original Soundtrack

No.	Title	Lyrics	Music	Artist	Length
1.	"The Sea Beside Me(我身边的海)"	Sagel	Hu Xiaoou	Sagel	5:12
2.	"10,000 Things I Wanna Do (一万件想做的事情)"	Zhou Jieying	Hu Xiaoou	Xu Mengjie	4:31
3.	"If Time Has a Button (如果时间有按钮)"	Zhou Jieying	Hu Xiaoou	Guan Xiaotong	5:16
4.	"Each Other's Wind (互为彼此的那阵风)"	Zhou Jieying	Hu Xiaoou	Luna Yin	4:30
Total length:					19:29
