= Jia Nai =

Chinese actress (born 2002)

- Born: Nazaket Mexmut; January 22, 2002 (age 24); Xinjiang, China
- Other names: Jia Naina, Kana
- Education: Central Academy of Drama
- Occupation: Actress
- Years active: 2022–present
- Agent: Haohan Entertainment

Chinese name
- Simplified Chinese: 那扎开提·买合木提
- Hanyu Pinyin: Nàzhākāití Mǎihémùtí

Nazaket Mexmut (Chinese: 那扎开提·买合木提; born January 22, 2002), also known as Jia Nai or Kana, is a Chinese actress. She is an ethnic Uyghur from Xinjiang.

== Filmography ==
=== Television series ===
Year	Title	Role	Notes	Ref.
2022	A Dream of Splendor	Zhang Haohao		
2023	Romance of a Twin Flower	Wen Wan		
2023	A Date with the Future	Yu Shishi		
2023	The Last Immortal	Yan Shuang		
2024	Sword and Fairy	Shuo Xuan		
2024	Brother	Xi Lin		
2024	Married	Tian Quizi		
2025	Love and Sword	Lin Wanci		
2025	Game for Peace	Xiao Rong		
2025	In the Name of Blossom	A Shi Na Dan		
2025	Fragrance of the Pomegranates	Guli Naer		
2025	Fox Spirit Matchmaker: Sword and Beloved	Qing Li		
2025	All Rise	Yan Fei		
2026	Fate Chooses You	Hua Niang		
TBA	The Melody of Love	Mu Xue		

== Awards and nominations ==
Year	Award	Category	Nominee(s)/Work(s)	Result	Ref.
2024	Tencent Video Star Awards	Best Newcomer in a Television Series	Jia Nai	Won	
