= Our Secret =

Chinese television series

- Promotional poster
- Also known as: Secrets in the Lattice
- Simplified Chinese: 暗格里的秘密
- Hanyu Pinyin: Àn gé lǐ de mìmì
- Genre: Romance; Youth
- Based on: Secrets in the Lattice by Er Dong Tu Zi
- Written by: Er Dong Tu Zi; Joker Sun; Gao Jia Qi; Tong Shuang Shuang
- Directed by: Zhang Xiaoan
- Starring: Chen Zheyuan; Xu Mengjie
- Opening theme: Always, I Love You (一直一直一直，喜欢你) by Li Xin Yi
- Ending theme: Taste of Romance (浪漫味道) by Jacky Du
- Country of origin: China
- Original language: Mandarin
- No. of seasons: 1
- No. of episodes: 24 (+1 special)

Production
- Production locations: Zhongshan, Guangdong, China
- Running time: 45 minutes
- Production company: Mango Excellent Media

Original release
- Network: Mango TV; iQIYI
- Release: 10 August – 26 August 2021

Our Secret (Chinese: 暗格里的秘密; pinyin: Àn gé lǐ de mìmì) is a 2021 Chinese television drama starring Chen Zheyuan and Xu Mengjie. It is based on the Chinese novel Secrets in the Lattice. The series aired on Mango TV from August 10 until August 26, 2021.

The series has surpassed a cumulative viewership of 1.3 billion across various platforms, including Mango TV's domestic application, YouTube, and Thailand TrueID.

== Synopsis ==
The series tells the story of a superior and unruly campus male god Zhou Siyue (Chen Zheyuan) and a headstrong, stubborn, and lovely Cinderella girl, Ding Xian (Xu Mengjie). From being mutually exclusive tablemates at school to becoming each other's lifelong companions in their journey through youth. Although they couldn't stand each other at first, they come to appreciate each other's strengths in their day-to-day interactions.

== Cast ==
=== Main ===
- Chen Zheyuan as Zhou Siyue

A young, handsome scholar who exudes an air of aloofness and intelligence. Despite his cold and distant exterior, he possesses a gentle and determined nature that drives him to pursue his innermost desires. In the face of family challenges, he remains resolute in his pursuit of his dreams.

- Xu Mengjie as Ding Xian

An unwavering and determined young woman who never turns away from challenges until she faces an insurmountable obstacle. Her life underwent a dramatic transformation when she relocated from a small town to Shenhai City. Influenced by her youthful impulsiveness she showcase her fierce determination and unwavering pursuit of her goals.

=== Supporting ===
- Fan Zhixin as Su Bocong

A childhood and senior friend of Ding Xian. He stepped in as a reliable confidant, offering a sympathetic ear and assistance with Ding Xian's studies.

- Wang Zexuan as Song Ziqi

A close friend of Zhou Siyue who is born into an ordinary family. He possesses an unshakable confidence in his conversational abilities. Growing up alongside his childhood sweetheart, Kong Shadi, who was both a schoolmate and a neighbor.

- Wang Yilan as Kong Shadi

A stunning and generous young woman hailing from a wealthy background, radiating both beauty and affluence. With a passionate spirit, she embodies the archetype of a "rich and beautiful" beauty. Extending a welcoming "hand of friendship" to the new arrival, Ding Xian, she quickly became Ding Xian's close friend during high school.

- Liu Zhiwei as You Keke

A close friend of Ding Xian from a different class. She approaches people and situations with an open-minded and nonjudgmental attitude, often taking on the role of a guiding and caring older sister. Her enigmatic charm and willingness to help others make her a charismatic presence in their lives.

- Li Riyao as Jiang Chen

== Original soundtrack ==
Our Secret OST Album

Soundtrack album by Various artists
- Released: 2021
- Genre: Soundtrack
- Length: 17:56
- Languages: Chinese; English

=== Our Secret: Original soundtrack ===
The drama soundtrack's is compiled in one album that consist of five songs. It was released on August 10, 2021 on various music platform.

Our Secret: Original Soundtrack

No.	Title	Lyrics	Music	Artist	Length
1.	"Always, I Love You (一直一直一直，喜欢你)"	Chen Xueran	Chen Xueran	Li Xinyi	3:36
2.	"Taste of Romance (浪漫味道)"	Hou Zhiao	Yu Wei	Jacky Du	3:16
3.	"His Dream of Love (他爱的梦)"	Lossonway	Yu Wei	Claire Kuo	3:36
4.	"The Furthest Happiness (最远的幸福)"	Pan Pan	Lu Xiaoyi	Li Junyi	3:31
5.	"Long Day"	Chen Xueran	Chen Xueran	Chen Xueran	3:57
Total length:					17:56

== Awards and nominations ==
Year	Award	Category	Recipient	Result	Ref.
2021	6th Hunan Province Online Original Audio-Visual Program Competition	First Prize in Drama Unit	Our Secret	Won	

== International broadcast ==
- South Korea – CNTV (January 8, 2022 - February 19, 2022)
- Vietnam – DNPT (November 2022)
- India - Amazon Mini TV (MX Player) (1 May 2024)
