= Xu Mengjie =

Chinese singer and actress

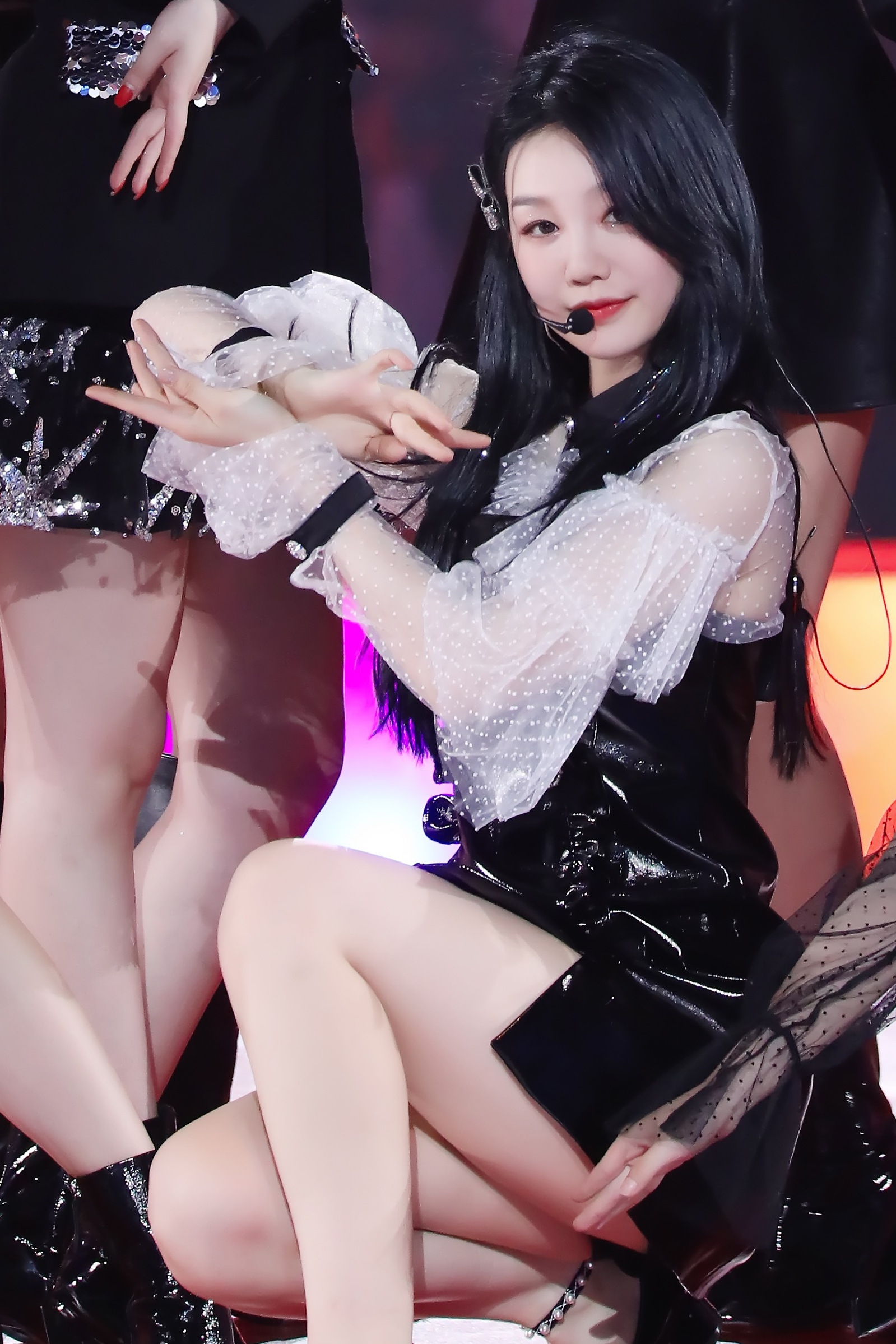
- Xu at Guangzhou, 2019
- Born: June 19, 1994 (age 31); Jinhua, Zhejiang, China
- Occupations: Singer; dancer; actress; model
- Agent: Easy Entertainment
- Musical career
- Origin: China
- Genres: C-pop; Dance-pop
- Instrument: Vocals
- Years active: 2015–present
- Labels: AMG; Wajijiwa Entertainment (Note: As a member of Rocket Girls 101 only.)
- Formerly of: Rocket Girls 101

Chinese name
- Traditional Chinese: 徐夢潔
- Simplified Chinese: 徐梦洁
Transcriptions
Standard Mandarin
- Hanyu Pinyin: Xú Mèngjié

Signature
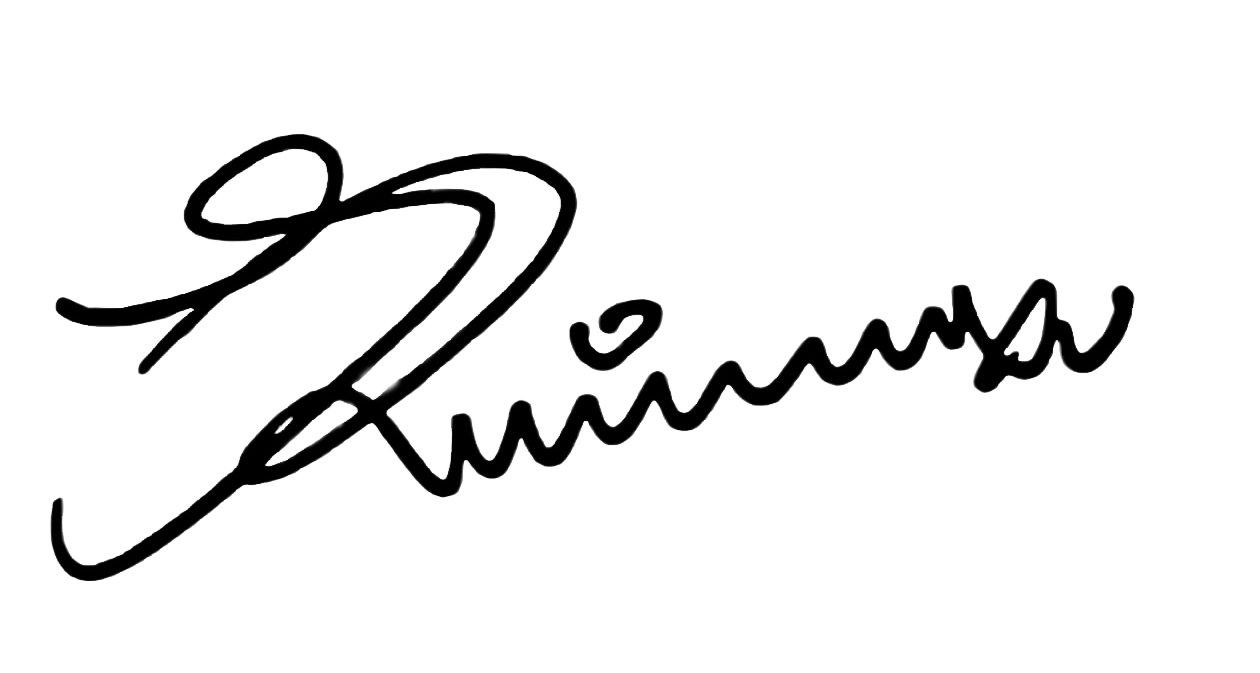

Xu Mengjie (Chinese: 徐梦洁; born 19 June 1994), also known as Rainbow Xu, (Note: Chinese: 小彩虹; Pinyin: Xiǎo Cǎihóng) is a Chinese singer and actress. She is a former member of the Chinese girl group Rocket Girls 101.

== Early life ==
Xu Mengjie was born on June 19, 1994, in China, Jinhua City, Zhejiang Province. Since the age of 12, she has been helping her parents in managing their own barbecue restaurant, and is well known as "Cold Drink Beauty." She used to be a dancer and sprinter before pursuing her dream to become an idol.

== Career ==
=== 2015–2017: Career beginnings ===
Xu made her debut in the show business when she joined LadyBees in 2015 as a member of Hive team SH1. Her exceptional skills and dedication quickly propelled her to the forefront, as she ranked 1st in the only LadyBees election. She subsequently transferred to Team Wind in 2017, and later left the group in 2018 after the group's disbandment.

=== 2018–2020: Produce 101 China and Rocket Girls 101 ===
Xu, alongside two members of LadyBees, was selected to represent Zimei Tao Culture in the 2018 girl group survival show Produce 101 China. Throughout her time on the show, she was known as the dark horse, as she never managed to secure a spot within the top 11 rankings until the finale. However, with a total of almost 84 million votes, Xu ultimately finished the show at rank 11, solidifying her position and securing a debut spot in Rocket Girls 101.

On June 23, 2018, the same day of the finale of Produce 101 China, Xu officially debuted as a member of Rocket Girls 101 and released their debut song titled "Rocket Girls."

In 2019, Xu starred as the protagonist for her first drama debut with Youku's youth web-series, Project 17: Spike, where she portrayed the role of Lin Wei.

Two years since her debut in Rocket Girls 101, the group officially disbanded in 2020. After the group's disbandment, Xu returned to her original company to continue her career as a soloist. Later on, she appeared in the Tencent Video sports reality show, Supernovae Games 3 where she earned the nickname "Demon King" as she currently holds the fastest record for 50M dash in the show.

=== 2021–present: Solo career and rising popularity ===
In January 2021, Xu terminated her contract with Asian Music Group (AMG), and established her own company, Beijing Hongtao Culture Communication Co., Ltd., as well as her own studio, Rainbow DreamWorks. Leading up to her own company establishment, Xu made her solo debut on June 18 by releasing her first extended play titled 11.

In August 2021, Xu starred as a female protagonist in the 2021 Mango TV's youth campus drama Our Secret, based on the popular Chinese novel Secrets in the Lattice. After landing the role of Ding Xian, Xu's popularity skyrocketed, launching her into stardom.

Continuing her success as an actress, Xu joined as one of the lead cast of a hit drama, Twenty Your Life On for its second season. The series premiered on August 17, 2022, with 40 episodes.

In 2023, Xu signed an exclusive contract with Easy Entertainment, after managing herself since 2021.

== Public image ==
Xu is well known for her unique rainbow eye smile. Everytime she smiles, her eyes crease into a rainbow shape, hence her nickname Rainbow. After appearing in the 2021 Mango TV's variety show Wow! Nice Figure 3, Chinese media and her fans have since recognized her as one of the "sweet girls" (甜妹) in the Chinese entertainment industry.

== Other ventures ==
=== Fashion and endorsements ===
Aside from various endorsements with her Rocket Girls 101 bandmates, Xu has promoted various products and featured in numerous advertisements. During her trainee years in LadyBees she appeared multiple times in a commercial video for McDonald's in China. In 2019, Marc Jacobs Daisy Love Lady Eau de Toilette was launched, and it was announced that Xu became the promotion ambassador of Daisy Love Fragrance. In 2020, she become a model and appeared in a promotional video for Olay and Skechers. In the same year, she was selected as one of the ambassador of Move Free where she served as the face of their new product.

Starting her career as soloist, Xu become the commercial model for FANCL in 2021. The following month she was chosen as the first ever brand spokesperson of a Chinese clothing brand ELAND. In 2022, Seventeen Light Years, a luxury low-alcohol fruit wine collaborated with Twenty Your Life On 2 and selected Xu as their brand ambassador. In 2023, she was announced as the youth brand ambassador for Skechers in China.

== Discography ==
=== Extended plays ===
List of extended plays, with selected details
Title	Album details
11	Released: June 18, 2021; Label: Rainbow Studio Dreamworks; Formats: Digital download, streaming; Track listing: 1. "TAG"; 2. "彩虹的笑"; 3. "等到明天再牵手"

=== Singles ===
List of singles, showing year released, chart position and album name
Title	Year	Peak chart positions	Album	Ref.
Title	Year	CHN (Note: The Billboard China Top 100 was launched in January 2019 by Billboard China.)	Album	Ref.
"Build An Airplane" (造一架飞机)	2019	—	The Wind (Note: Song was part from Rocket Girls 101's album, but a solo released by Xu Mengjie.)	
"The Flowers" (花香)	2021	—	Non-album singles	
"Rainbow Smile" (彩虹的微笑)	2022	—	Non-album singles	
"You Whom I Never Met" (未曾谋面的你)	2023	—	You Whom I Never Met (Note: Has 4 different version including a collaboration between Xu Mengjie and Japanese singer Yuiko Ōhara.)	

=== Soundtrack appearances ===
List of soundtrack appearances, showing year released, chart position and album name
Title	Year	Peak chart positions	Album	Ref.
Title	Year	CHN	Album	Ref.
As lead artist
"Like You"	2021	—	Unusual Idol Love OST	
"One Way, Lane" (单行，线)	2021	—	The Ideal City OST	
"Joyful Delivery" (欢乐送)	2021	—	Happy Landlord OST	
"The First Time I Saw You" (第一眼遇见你)	2022	—	Si Wuxie OST	
"10,000 Things I Wanna Do" (万件想做的事情)	2022	—	Twenty Your Life On 2 OST	
"Tiptoe" (踮脚尖)	2022	—	Double Love OST	
Collaborations
"Never Stand Still" (with Yang Chaoyue and Lai Meiyun)	2019	—	Project 17: Spike OST	
"—" denotes releases that did not chart or were not released in that region.

=== Songwriting credits ===
List of songs, showing year released, artist name and name of the album
Year	Artist	Album	Song	Lyricist		Composer		Ref.
Year	Artist	Album	Song	Credited	With	Credited	With	Ref.
2019	Xu Mengjie	The Wind	"Build An Airplane"(造一架飞机)	Yes	Dai Yuedong	No	Aaron Lee, Sammy Constantine	
2021	Xu Mengjie	11	"TAG"	Yes	Zhang Pengpeng	No	Munee	
2021	Xu Mengjie	11	"Laugh of Rainbow"(彩虹的笑)	Yes	Mi Jiayu	No	Zhou Yili	

== Filmography ==
=== Film ===
Year	Title	Role	Notes	Ref.
2018	Love Apartments	Bartender	Minor role	

=== Television series ===
Year	Title	Role	Notes	Ref.
2019	Project 17: Spike	Lin Wei	Main role	
2021	Love Me Fearlessly	Yu Guo	Main role	
2021	Our Secret	Ding Xian	Main role	
2022	Twenty Your Life On 2	Ding Yixuan	Main role	
2024	Later I Laughed	Xiao Lan	Main role	
TBA	Chasing the Wind		Supporting Role	

=== Television show ===
Year	Title	Role	Notes	Ref.
2016	Playing Cafe	Regular member		
2018	Produce 101 China	Contestant	Finished 11th	
2020	Super Novae Games 3	Contestant	Team Idol/Red	
2021	Super Novae Games 4	Contestant	Team Zhejiang	
2021–2022	Be With You 2	Main host	Episode 1–4 and 7–10	
2021–2022	Wow! Nice Figure 3	Regular member		
2022	Masked Dancing King 3	Contestant	Episode 5–6	
2022–2023	Memoon Singer	Regular member		
2023	Hit It Off	Regular member		

== Awards and nominations ==
Name of the award ceremony, year presented, category, nominee of the award, and the result of the nomination
Award ceremony	Year	Category	Nominee / Work	Result	Ref.
Boutique Style Cloud Festival	2021	Pioneer Artist of the Year	Xu Mengjie	Won	
Golden Rooster Awards	2023	Young Actor for Stary Oceans	Xu Mengjie	Included	
Wenrong Award	2022	Young Actor Support Program	Xu Mengjie	Won	
