= Detective Chinatown (web series) =

Chinese web television series

- Season 2 - Promotional Poster
- Chinese: 唐人街探案
- Literal meaning: Detective in Chinatown
- Hanyu Pinyin: Tángrénjiē Tàn Àn
- Genre: Mystery; Crime; Drama
- Created by: Chen Sicheng
- Written by: Chen Sicheng
- Directed by: Ke Wenli (Season 1); Dai Mo (Season 1); Yao Wenyi (Season 1 & 2); Lai Mukuan (Season 1); Wang Tianwei (Season 2)
- Starring: Roy Chiu; Zhang Yishang; Janine Chang; Chen Zheyuan (Season 1); Yuxian Shang (Season 2); Haoming Yu (Season 2); Kenny Bee (Season 2)
- Opening theme: Obsession (执念) by NZBZ
- Country of origin: China
- Original language: Mandarin
- No. of seasons: 2
- No. of episodes: 28

Production
- Executive producer: Chen Sicheng
- Producers: Dai Ying; Shang Na
- Camera setup: Multi-camera
- Running time: 45 minutes
- Production companies: Beijing iQIYI Technology Co., Ltd.; Beijing Yitong Legend Film and Television Culture Co., Ltd.; Wanda Film and Television Media Co., Ltd.; Shanghai Chengya Film and Television Culture Media Co., Ltd.

Original release
- Network: iQIYI
- Release: 1 January 2020 – 12 March 2024

Related
- Detective Chinatown; Detective Chinatown 2 Detective Chinatown 3

Detective Chinatown (Chinese: 唐人街探案; pinyin: Tángrénjiē Tàn Àn) is a Chinese mystery crime drama web television series. It is executively produced by Chen Sicheng, with the first season having an ensemble cast including Roy Chiu, Janine Chang, Zhang Yishang, Chen Zheyuan and Yuxian Shang, Haoming Yu and Kenny Bee joining in season two.

The web series serves as a spin-off from the acclaimed Detective Chinatown film franchise, featuring detectives Tang Ren (Wang Baoqiang) and Qin Feng (Liu Haoran). However, it goes beyond by introducing new detectives and delving deeper into the intricate mysteries and cases within the Detective Chinatown universe.

The web series was designed to be a part of the expanding Detective Chinatown universe storyline with events of the web series beginning in the aftermath of the first film, Detective Chinatown, and running concurrently with those of Detective Chinatown 2 and Detective Chinatown 3.

Premiering in January, 2020 and then in February, 2024, both seasons were made available exclusively on the subscription video on-demand over-the-top streaming service iQIYI with the initial episodes made free to watch and then subsequent episodes available for VIP members.

== Synopsis ==
=== Season 1 (2020) ===
Several weird cases happen in succession in Thailand. Lin Mo, a disciple of Tang Ren (Wang Baoqiang) who’s reputed to be the #1 Detective of Chinatown, and Noda Koji, Noda Hiroshi’s (Satoshi Tsumabuki) younger brother, also get involved and become overwhelmed during the investigation. The victim’s wife Ivy (Janine Chang), Wen the bar singer, Lu Jingjing, a member of the Five Spirited Detectives, and Sa Sha (Zhang Yishang) the rookie policewoman come on stage one after another. Behind intricate clues, the truth hidden in the dark is being brought into daylight.

The season is separated into three cases, with the first two focusing on master detective Lin Mo (Roy Chiu), while the third follows leader of the group Five Spirited Detectives Noda Koji (Chen Zheyuan).

=== Season 2 (2024) ===
A series of bizarre cases have re-emerged overseas. With Tang Ren's (Wang Baoqiang) senior disciple Lin Mo, the genius hacker Kiko, and many new detectives and characters making their appearances one after another! In the pursuit of truth, the veteran detectives once again gather to stir up the storm in the Chinatown! The suspenseful story combines a humorous style with profound meaning, presenting a new wave of detective works.

The season is separated into four cases, with the first two focusing on master detective Lin Mo (Roy Chiu), while the other two follows talented hacker Kiko (Yuxian Shang).

== Episodes ==
Season	Episodes	Originally released	
Season	Episodes	First released	Last released
1	12	January 1, 2020	January 16, 2020
2	16	February 29, 2024	March 12, 2024

=== Season 1 ===
==== Case 1 - Mandala's Dance (Episodes: 1-4) ====
The events of this case occur after the Gold Murder Case from Detective Chinatown and during the Five Elements Serial Murder Case in Detective Chinatown 2, unfolding concurrently with Case 3 - Amusement Park (Episodes: 9-12) from Season 2.

No.	Title	Directed by	Written by	Original release date
1.1	"Mandala's Dance - Episode 1"	Ke Wenli	Chen Sicheng	January 1, 2020
In Bangkok, a bizarre "suicide by falling from a building" occurred in a high-end apartment. Surveillance showed the deceased, A Shui, sleepwalking to the rooftop, dancing, and jumping off. Rumors of "Brahma killing people" spread, linked to recent supernatural events. The police sought help from "ghost detective" Tang Ren, who assigned his apprentice, Lin Mo, to investigate. Assisted by policewoman Sasha, Lin Mo learned from A Shui's husband, Qin Jun, that A Shui claimed persecution by Brahma and experienced supernatural phenomena. On the night of her death, Qin Jun was asleep. Lin Mo investigated further by visiting A Shui's psychologist and witnesses. Cameos - Wang Baoqiang as Tang Ren & Xiao Yang as Kun Tai
2.1	"Mandala's Dance - Episode 2"	Ke Wenli	Chen Sicheng	January 1, 2020
Awen, along with A Shui's other high school roommates Dinan and Chaya, reported to the police, claiming they were troubled by "Brahma." Recently, Dinan found a palm print on his roof matching his hand, and Chaya, hospitalized for an eye disease, was attacked by rosary beads at home. Lin Mo investigated their connection but found only their shared high school background. One night, Dinan and Awen's car plunged into a river; Dinan saw a golden Brahma statue underwater. Under pressure, the police chief held a ritual where Awen confessed they had broken a vow to Brahma made in high school. After the ritual, Awen was nearly hit by a falling billboard.
3.1	"Mandala's Dance - Episode 3"	Ke Wenli	Chen Sicheng	January 2, 2020
To pursue clues, Lin Mo visited Luming Middle School, where the four girls had studied and he had once substituted. The principal revealed the girls were dorm roommates who missed their college entrance exam due to typhoid fever. A Shui had once defended Ah Wen by throwing water on a boy, Pei Shan, who Ah Wen liked. At A Shui's funeral, a mysterious man tried to stab her husband, Qin Jun. Lin Mo tracked the man, finding him at Pei Shan's "Statue Factory." There, Lin Mo discovered a blank yearbook page for A Shui and perfume test paper indicating unspoken love. Confronting Pei Shan at A Shui's grave, Lin Mo learned the sisters' relationships were strained, and Qin Jun's marriage was unhappy. Cameo - Yuxian Shang as Kiko
4.1	"Mandala's Dance - Episode 4"	Ke Wenli	Chen Sicheng	January 2, 2020
Di Nan fell from his house, with A Wen present. A Wen confessed she pushed him during a confrontation; Di Nan, in a rage, threatened her like a ghost. The police chief, fed up with rumors of ghost possession, halted the investigation. Lin Mo and Sasha pursued a lead to the hospital where Chaya was, but she had left for abroad. Chasing to the airport, they arrived too late. Chaya's escape revealed the truth: A Wen, Di Nan, and Chaya orchestrated fake incidents to cover up A Shui's murder. Qin Jun and A Wen staged A Shui's "suicide," with A Wen posing as A Shui dancing on the rooftop before Qin Jun pushed her off.

==== Case 2 - Name of the Rose (Episodes: 5-8) ====
This case serves as a prequel to the Mandala's Dance case and takes place just before the Five Elements Serial Murder Case in Detective Chinatown 2.

No.	Title	Directed by	Written by	Original release date
5.2	"Name of the Rose - Episode 1"	Dai Mo	Chen Sicheng	January 8, 2020
Orphan Lin Mo grew up in a Bangkok welfare home, escaping at thirteen. Witnessing a murder, he was saved by scavenger Lao Yu, who trained him for the job. They were controlled by a boss named "Smiley Face," tasked with cleaning up murder scenes. Lin Mo's hesitation led to Lao Yu's death, prompting Lin Mo's vow to avenge him. To conceal his identity, Lin Mo became a chemistry teacher, where students failed to prank him as they did with previous teachers. His resilience intrigued them.
6.2	"Name of the Rose - Episode 2"	Yao Wenyi	Chen Sicheng	January 8, 2020
Lin Mo tracked Kunta's wife, Ivy, to her flower shop using Kunta's unique scent. Dulang and others identified Ivy, recognizing her from past fraud cases where victims willingly participated. Suspecting Ivy hired someone to kill Kunta, Lin Mo investigated further but was knocked out by Ivy. Upon awakening, Lin Mo argued his innocence, revealing someone trailed Kunta before his death. Ivy, convinced, released Lin Mo, who then questioned her about Kunta's death. Interrupted by customers, Lin Mo posed as the shop owner, unaware one was a female killer targeting him. The killer, disguised as a student, launched a surprise attack, revealing her true identity.
7.2	"Name of the Rose - Episode 3"	Dai Mo	Chen Sicheng	January 9, 2020
Lin Mo confronted Ivy at the dock, revealing evidence from his scavenger past, including a container with clues to past murders. He deduced "Smiley Face" killed detective Gad, leading them to Gad's apartment. Lin Mo, using his keen sense of smell, discovered Gad's hidden phone in moldy rice, indicating his fear before death. They found clues from an elderly neighbor, suggesting Gad had called the police before being killed, half an hour later. Ivy, believing Kunta was killed by "Smiley Face," was shocked when Lin Mo showed her photos Gad took while tracking her. Ivy revealed Kunta hired Gad to investigate her, suspecting her secretive activities. She was puzzled why Gad was killed for this.
8.2	"Name of the Rose - Episode 4"	Yao Wenyi	Chen Sicheng	January 9, 2020
Dulang and others rushed to the TV station where Lin Mo and Ivy were. Lin Mo cleverly evaded police and escaped with Ivy. He cleared his suspicion of her, expressing concern for her safety. Kiko hacked Lin Mo's phone, revealing only three police received Gad's alarm before his murder, hinting "Smiley Face" was among them. Ivy devised a plan to expose "Smiley Face," needing a trustworthy officer like Sasha. With Lin Mo's guidance, Sasha sent fake addresses to three suspects, including Dulang. Ivy planned to catch the killer at the police's chosen address. Cameos - Wang Baoqiang as Tang Ren, Xiao Yang as Kun Tai & Yuxian Shang as Kiko

==== Case 3 - Ghost Invitational (Episodes: 9-12) ====
The events of this case occur after the Five Elements Serial Murder Case depicted in :Detective Chinatown 2.

No.	Title	Directed by	Written by	Original release date
9.3	"Ghost Invitational - Episode 1"	Lai Mukuan	Chen Sicheng	January 15, 2020
Koji Noda and friends, avid players of the classic battle royale first-person shooter game Rise Again, enter the "Ghost Invitational Tournament" in Taiwan to challenge retired e-sports legend Aji. Aji's former team, "H5," led by Mr. C, faces their old rivals "Tyrant" and suffers a devastating ambush. Amid chaos, Master C leaves in anger. Meanwhile, Noda's team confronts challenges; his teammates perish, leaving only him. Later, Haoji is captured by the enemy. The game's eerie familiarity to Aji's past and the appearance of his virtual character Ghost raise suspicions. The tournament takes a dangerous turn for both teams, leading to unexpected outcomes.
10.3	"Ghost Invitational - Episode 2"	Lai Mukuan	Chen Sicheng	January 15, 2020
Ghost's appearance thrilled the players, thinking it a tribute to Aji. However, shock struck as they witnessed him poison Mr. C on screen, later finding Mr. C dead. Ghost accused Mr. C of a "crime" and warned of other "sinners" among them, forcing all to kill them in-game. Failure meant death for everyone. Attempts to escape or break free failed, revealing explosives in the gym. Boss urged to continue, claiming it as Aji's revenge. He revealed Aji's disappearance truth, leading to his and others' bizarre deaths, escalating the dilemma of real-life consequences in the deadly game.
11.3	"Ghost Invitational - Episode 3"	Lai Mukuan	Chen Sicheng	January 16, 2020
Facing Xiao Fei's accusation, Brother Diao and Big Goose denied match-fixing and shifted blame onto Xiao Fei, branding him Aji's killer. With no evidence, Xiao Fei chose in-game suicide to prove innocence, incriminating Brother Diao and Big Goose. Noda Haoji pressed them about Aji's death, urging honesty for safety. Refusing to confess, the group suggested killing them to end the game. Despite being cornered, Brother Diao and Big Goose remained silent. As tension peaked, Xiao Fei shot himself, revealing himself as a "sinner" for participating in match-fixing. Da'e confessed Aji discovered their scheme, leading to a fatal confrontation.
12.3	"Ghost Invitational - Episode 4"	Lai Mukuan	Chen Sicheng	January 16, 2020
After analyzing dashcam footage, Noda Haoji deduces the boss as the true killer. Ghost reappears, killing Diao Ge, Da Goose, and Kale in-game. Police intervention ends the crisis, but Ghost's revenge continues. The next day, Diao Ge and Da Goose are found shot dead at the police station. Ghost's influence extends outside the game. Kale attempts to burn Aji's body to end the curse but is thwarted by Haoji and police surveillance. Exposed, Kale confesses to orchestrating the match-fixing scheme alone. Haoji reveals the staged deaths and traps, including those of the boss and Mr. C, orchestrated to expose Kale's guilt. Cameo - Liu Haoran as Qin Feng & Yuxian Shang as Kiko

=== Season 2 ===
==== Case 1 - Angel's Melody (Episodes: 1-4) ====
The events of case 1 and 2 take place after the Locked Room Murder Case depicted in Detective Chinatown 3.

No.	Title	Directed by	Written by	Original release date
1.1	"Angel's Melody - Episode 1"	Yao Wenyi	Chen Sicheng	February 29, 2024
Angel Sanatorium is a secluded place housing various mentally ill patients. Lin Mo, pinned down, had scissors thrust into his nostrils amid cheers. Three days earlier, he received a tip about organ trafficking there and decided to investigate. He found that the deceased were marginalized individuals, with deaths ruled as accidental or due to illness. Posing as a patient, Lin Mo discovered the informant was a pianist, whom he saw strangled on his first night. Using his olfactory memory, Lin Mo suspected the head nurse, but patient Shama accused Lin Mo of the murder. Deemed unstable, Lin Mo faced electroshock before Jack Jaa intervened. Cameos - Wang Baoqiang as Tang Ren & Tony Jaa as Jack Jaa
2.1	"Angel's Melody - Episode 2"	Yao Wenyi	Chen Sicheng	February 29, 2024
Delivering food to Jack Jaa, Lin Mo discovered that Jack was helping him solve the case on Tang Ren's request. The first step was deciphering the pianist's five-line tattoo. Unable to contact the outside world, Lin Mo used local resources. Alai, skilled in music, converted the five-line score into letters, revealing meaningless words. However, the melody resembled the Japanese folk song "Sakura," matching the name of a female patient in Ward 4. She fit the murderer's profile and admitted to killing the pianist and others, motivated by revenge for her stepfather's abuse and the pianist's betrayal. Lin Mo began planning a self-rescue. Cameo - Tony Jaa as Jack Jaa
3.1	"Angel's Melody - Episode 3"	Yao Wenyi	Chen Sicheng	February 29, 2024
Lin Mo and Jack Jaa exhausted the guards, broke out, and incited the patients to set fires and create chaos. In the mayhem, Jack found Sakura's body with her organs removed. Lin Mo infiltrated the staff area and sought help from psychologist An Song, who had a computer science degree. An Song deciphered the five-line staff's English letters, identifying the head nurse as the organ thief and murderer. Late at night, a man entered the morgue to cut open the head nurse's stomach. The "corpse" grabbed his hand—Lin Mo, pretending to be dead. Jack and the head nurse caught the man, An Song, red-handed. Cameos - Tony Jaa as Jack Jaa & Xiao Yang as Kun Tai
4.1	"Angel's Melody - Episode 4"	Yao Wenyi	Chen Sicheng	March 1, 2024
Lin Mo identified the real murderer, starting with Sakura, who sacrificed her life following a strict creed. An Song believed in using extreme measures to fix a crazy world, which guided Lin Mo to expose him. Police found evidence of An Song’s organ theft in his trash. Diagnosed with psychopathic personality disorder, An Song feared society and collapsed when leaving the sanatorium, begging to return and confess. The case and the pianist's mystery were solved, and Lin Mo's sense of smell was restored. He realized that everyone's fate is controlled by greater forces beyond human understanding. Cameo - Xiao Yang as Kun Tai

==== Case 2 - Devil's Breath (Episodes: 5-8) ====
No.	Title	Directed by	Written by	Original release date
5.2	"Devil's Breath - Episode 1"	Yao Wenyi	Chen Sicheng	March 1, 2024
Lawyer Naven's mysterious fall prompted Lin Mo and Officer Sasha to investigate. Lin Mo found several knives on Naven and suspected revenge or punishment. They discovered Amin had hired Naven for a case that failed, leading to conflict. Amin, who supported female anchors and transferred money to a "Spiritual Association," was tracked down. Amin, dependent on his mother and leading a loveless life, found solace in the association. His faith was shattered when a female anchor he adored announced her marriage. Amin hugged her and rushed to the balcony, resulting in their fatal fall. Lin Mo was left speechless.
6.2	"Devil's Breath - Episode 2"	Yao Wenyi	Chen Sicheng	March 2, 2024
The investigation revealed that Amin was involved in Naven's murder but wasn't the main perpetrator. Amin's hopeless life and external influences led to his demise. A debt collector from the spiritual association raised Lin Mo's suspicion. Naven had coma-inducing drugs in his system, and Xiaocha exhibited abnormalities. Huang Po, a terminal brain cancer patient and spiritual association member, frequently visited Xiaocha. Lin Mo suspected Huang Po's involvement in Naven's death and became interested in the association, discovering its leader used anesthetics to control members. Huang Po believed the association could cure her but was misled. Lin Mo deduced her involvement through a lucky bag found near Naven. Despite his hopes, Huang Po ended her life instead of confessing.
7.2	"Devil's Breath - Episode 3"	Yao Wenyi	Chen Sicheng	March 3, 2024
Huang Po's lost lucky bag was found by her accomplice. Before her death, signs suggested she took a hallucinogen, likely "Devil's Breath," to ease her cancer pain. After Huang Po's death, Xiaocha showed rare sadness, as Huang Po had saved her. Lin Mo believed Xiaocha might be salvageable. Amin, Huang Po, and Naven had private grudges, making them scapegoats for the real murderer, who manipulated the spiritual association for profit and deceit. Aoyi denied Lin Mo's accusations. One rainy night, Lin Mo drank water from Xiaocha and began hallucinating his dead parents, feeling happiness. Xiaocha then signaled a van stopping outside Tang Ren's office.
8.2	"Devil's Breath - Episode 4"	Yao Wenyi	Chen Sicheng	March 4, 2024
Huang Po's lost lucky bag was found by her accomplice. Before her death, signs suggested she took a hallucinogen, likely "Devil's Breath," to ease her cancer pain. After Huang Po's death, Xiaocha showed rare sadness, as Huang Po had saved her. Lin Mo believed Xiaocha might be salvageable. Amin, Huang Po, and Naven had private grudges, making them scapegoats for the real murderer, who manipulated the spiritual association for profit and deceit. Aoyi denied Lin Mo's accusations. One rainy night, Lin Mo drank water from Xiaocha and began hallucinating his dead parents, feeling happiness. Xiaocha then signaled a van stopping outside Tang Ren's office.

==== Case 3 - Amusement Park (Episodes: 9-12) ====
The events of this case take place just before the Five Elements Serial Murder Case in Detective Chinatown 2 and concurrently with Case 1 - Mandala's Dance (Episodes: 1-5) from Season 1.

No.	Title	Directed by	Written by	Original release date
9.3	"Amusement Park - Episode 1"	Wang Tianwei	Chen Sicheng	March 5, 2024
Kiko makes a living through client commissions, working hard to buy a house and escape her contentious relationship with her mother, Wang Jiaoyun. Their conflict stems from the suicide of Kiko's sister 15 years ago, a topic neither wants to discuss. Kiko believes a man in black was involved in her sister's death. Meanwhile, Officer Lin Sen investigates Shao Feifei's apparent suicide in Lavender Building, which resembles Kiko's sister's case. Lin Yingshu enlists Kiko's help. Obsessed with uncovering the truth, Kiko hacks Shao Feifei's computer for clues but gets hacked in return.
10.3	"Amusement Park - Episode 2"	Wang Tianwei	Chen Sicheng	March 6, 2024
Kiko visited the crime scene, discovering evidence that Shao Feifei had visited the hotel before. Kiko and Lin Yingshu learned at Shao Feifei's school that she had changed dramatically in six months, likely due to "new friends" outside. Lin Sen found that a girl named Xiaoya had reported an incident at the hotel five years ago, but she denied it. Kiko tracked Shao Feifei's phone to an amusement park, where they met her "new friend," employee NEO. NEO denied a close relationship, but Kiko and Lin followed him after work and found him attempting to assassinate a man named Fanan.
11.3	"Amusement Park - Episode 3"	Wang Tianwei	Chen Sicheng	March 7, 2024
Neo confessed he and Shao Feifei liked each other, but her demeanor changed after meeting Fanan. Neo believed Fanan harmed Shao Feifei and wanted revenge. Kiko suspected Fanan also hurt her sister. Lin Sen and Lin Yingshu focused on Xiaoya, but she had moved. They searched for her while Kiko found a dark web link called "MASK" on Shao Feifei's phone and entered it as a visitor. Lin Sen located Xiaoya, who revealed she was forced into prostitution by Fanan, whose business thrived with MASK. Kiko infiltrated MASK, met Fanan online, and exited just before he discovered her true identity.
12.3	"Amusement Park - Episode 4"	Wang Tianwei	Chen Sicheng	March 8, 2024
Kiko used her sister's identity to pose as a persecuted girl, planning to call the police when Fanan arrived. Fanan, recognizing Kiko's sister, intended to kill Kiko, but Lin Sen and the police intervened in time. Kiko interrogated Fanan, who admitted to forcing her sister into prostitution but denied killing her; both her sister and Shao Feifei had committed suicide. Lin Yingshu, aided by Xiaoya, found more victims to accuse Fanan. Peace was restored, and Kiko resolved her issues with Wang Jiaoyun, buying the sugar water shop where she worked. Kiko then received a $5 million invitation to New York for an investigation. Post Credit Cameo - Janine Chang as Ivy

==== Case 4 - Golden City (Episodes: 13-16) ====
The events of this case unfold immediately following the Locked Room Murder Case in Detective Chinatown 3.

No.	Title	Directed by	Written by	Original release date
13.4	"Golden City - Episode 1"	Wang Tianwei	Chen Sicheng	March 9, 2024
After returning from New York, Kiko learned of a meticulously planned bank robbery in Bangladesh, likely orchestrated by her old acquaintance, hacker Ouyang. Meanwhile, Lin Yingshu, Wang Jiaoyun's admirer, sought justice after his son's promotion was unjustly overridden by wipay boss Qiao Qingshan. Kiko, noticing her mother's struggling business, headed to wipay's 30th-anniversary celebration, hoping to solve the vault case to alleviate her mother's financial woes. At the event, chaos erupted when Qiao Qingshan fell to his death, with Lin Yingshu spotted on the roof. Cameo - Liu Haoran as Qin Feng
14.4	"Golden City - Episode 2"	Wang Tianwei	Chen Sicheng	March 10, 2024
Lin Yingshu was arrested for Qiao Qingshan's murder, while Lin Sen was suspended, and Qiao Shanshan advised against involvement. Kiko, invited by Lin Sen, joined as an assistant to clear Lin Yingshu's name. She discovered the close brotherhood between Qiao Qingshan, Huang Hai, and Chen Jinghan, founders of Wipay. Ouyang warned her away from Wipay, but she decided to investigate further. With journalist Tina's help, she linked the vault theft and Qiao Qingshan's murder. Lin Sen, representing Lin Yingshu's son, joined forces. This trio aimed to uncover the truth behind the intertwined cases.
15.4	"Golden City - Episode 3"	Wang Tianwei	Chen Sicheng	March 11, 2024
Tina helps Kiko and Lin Sen infiltrate Wipay. Kiko uncovers the conflicts among the Wipay founders through internal networks. As Qiao Shanshan nearly discovers them, Lin Sen diverts attention, leading to his arrest. After his release, Kiko finds evidence of Huang Hai's guilt in Qiao Qingshan's murder. Huang Hai confesses, clearing Lin Yingshu. The Wipay board ousts Huang Hai and appoints Chen Jinghan. Tina informs Kiko of Huang Hai's confession and Ouyang's presence. Kiko discovers incriminating chats in Huang Hai's office before witnessing Uncle Jie's death. Ouyang's involvement raises suspicions.
16.4	"Golden City - Episode 4"	Wang Tianwei	Chen Sicheng	March 12, 2024
Kiko rushed to the police station. She confirmed her reasoning through the interrogation of Huang Hai - Chen Jinghan was the murderer. Chen Jinghan found Qiao Shanshan and told the truth. Before being arrested, Chen Jinghan tried to shoot the police, and the police shot him. After Chen Jinghan's death, the police station's TV, computer, and Quan Bingang screens simultaneously played the "survivor" video. The man wearing the "survivor" MASK conveyed paranoid ideas to the public and declared that he would change the world. This behavior caused an uproar in public opinion. At this moment, Ouyang was in the former base camp. He knew that he was calculated by Kiko. Kiko also broke up with Ouyang, let Ouyang go, and let him leave. The crisis was resolved and everything was settled. Qiao Shanshan received a "non-existent huge sum of money" in name. As the heir, Qiao Shanshan owned the money and handed it over to Kiko. Kiko kept the huge sum of money and thought about it. She wanted to help the poor, but she also understood the cost of sending the money. Kiko hesitated and pressed the keyboard.

=== Timeline ===
1. (2016 - Bangkok, Thailand) Gold Murder (Detective Chinatown)
2. (2018 - Bangkok, Thailand) Name of the Rose - Season 1 - Episodes: 5-8
3. (2018 - Hong Kong, China) Amusement Park - Season 2 - Episodes: 9-12
4. (2018 - Bangkok, Thailand) Mandala's Dance - Season 1 - Episodes: 1-5
5. (2018 - New York, United States of America) Five Elements Serial Murder (Detective Chinatown 2)
6. (2018 - High Seas, Taiwan) Ghost Invitational - Season 1 - Episodes: 9-12
7. (2018 - Tokyo, Japan) Locked Room Murder (Detective Chinatown 3)
8. (2019 - Hong Kong, China) Golden City - Season 2 - Episodes: 13-16
9. (2021 - Bangkok, Thailand) Angel's Melody - Season 2 - Episodes: 1-5
10. (2021 - Bangkok, Thailand) Devil's Breath - Season 2 - Episodes: 6-8

== Cast ==
=== Main Cast ===
- Roy Chiu as Lin Mo (Chinese: 林默)

Tang Ren's apprentice. Lin Mo is extremely sensitive to smells. He originally had a wealthy and happy family, but he witnessed his mother being murdered and became an orphan. After that, he continued to train his sense of smell in order to catch the murderer again by smell one day. The sense of smell has also become a powerful weapon for Lin Mo to investigate cases. He repeatedly uses the smell left at the crime scene to find the suspect's trace. He is currently ranked #4 on the CrimeMaster App. He also makes a cameo appearance in the film Detective Chinatown 3.

- Zhang Yishang as Sa Sha (Chinese: 萨沙)

A Chinese female police officer (deputy inspector) at the Chinatown Police Station in Bangkok. Sasha is cool and reliable in her investigations, and she is quick and skillful. She uses her special talents and keen insight to solve confusing mysteries. She is smart and sweet in her daily life, with a hint of the cuteness of a little girl. The contrast between the two sides is moving.

- Chen Zheyuan as Noda Koji (Chinese: 野田昊二) (Season 1)

An e-sports gamer and a young detective who is the leader of the group - Five Spirited Detectives. The second son of Japan's richest woman Masako Noda, the 36th heir to the Noda Foundation. He is the younger brother of CrimeMaster App #3 Noda Hiroshi (Satoshi Tsumabuki), whom he regards as his mortal enemy and firmly believes is stronger than him. He is currently ranked #2999 on the Crimemaster App. He also makes a cameo appearance in the film Detective Chinatown 3.

- Yuxian Shang as Kiko (Cameo - Season 1, Main Cast - Season 2)

First introduced in the Five Elements Serial Murder case in Detective Chinatown 2. She is a female hacker from Hong Kong who is proficient in technology and speaks multiple languages. A genius hacker who is proficient in various computer technologies. She can break through firewalls at a very fast speed, freely enter and exit the network systems of police stations around the world, and obtain massive information sources in the database without leaving any traces. Any information that needs to be investigated can be easily obtained by her as long as there are clues. Although she is more proficient in science and technology, her logical reasoning ability is not inferior. She is currently ranked #5 on the CrimeMaster App. She also makes an appearance in Detective Chinatown 3.

=== Supporting Cast ===
- Janine Chang as Ivy (Chinese: 金绮雯) (Main Cast - Season 1, Cameo - Season 2)

The wife of the deceased in the "Name of the Rose" case was once Lin Mo's partner. She was a flower shop owner who immigrated to Thailand with her mother when she was 14 years old. She had been married four times, and all four husbands died abnormally. The police believed that Ivy was related to the rumored Smiley Face Organization in Thailand. This organization would find beautiful women to lure rich people into marriage, then find killers to kill the rich people and make it look like an accidental death, and use the marriage relationship to transfer all assets. She is one of the members of Q, the villainous organization in the Detective Chinatown universe. She also appears in Detective Chinatown 3.

- Haoming Yu as Lin Sen (Chinese: 林森) (Season 2)

A policeman in Bingang City, he is persistent in pursuing the truth. He has been trying his best to investigate the truth in the Shao Feifei case, even if it means losing the opportunity to be a candidate for the director. He has a father who used to be a policeman. His father also gave a lot of help in this case, and together with Kiko, he found out the truth step by step in secret.

- Kenny Bee as Lin Yingshu (Chinese: 林英树) (Season 2)

Lin Sen's father, a retired policeman, and Kiko's detective partner. Although he sometimes looks like a naughty boy, he never lags behind in pursuing the truth and investigating cases. In the amusement park case, he worked together with Kiko to find out the truth about MASK and bring Fanan to justice.

=== Cameos ===
- Wang Baoqiang as Tang Ren (Chinese: 唐仁) (Season 1 & Season 2)
- Liu Haoran as Qin Feng (Chinese: 秦风) (Season 1 & Season 2)
- Xiao Yang as Kun Tai (Chinese: 坤泰) (Season 1 & Season 2)
- Yuxian Shang as Kiko (Season 1)
- Zhang Shi as Dulang (Chinese: 度郎) (Season 1 & Season 2)
- Tony Jaa as Jack Jaa (Season 2)
- Janine Chang as Ivy (Chinese: 金绮雯) (Season 2)

=== Additional Cast ===
==== Season 1 - Mandala's Dance (Episodes: 1-4) ====
- Xie Wenxuan as Lin Shuiqing
- Wang Zhener as Ah Wen
- Gao Ye as Di Nan
- Huang Kaijie as Qin Jun
- Dai Mo as Pei Shan
- Wang Yang as Cha Ya
- Deng Enxi as Xiao Ai

==== Season 1 - Name of the Rose (Episodes: 5-8) ====
- Janine Chang as Ivy
- Zhang Yishang as Sa Sha
- Zhang Songwen as Wen Song
- Chen Yusi as An Qi
- Deng Enxi as Xiao Ai
- Chang Shih as Du Lang
- Zhang Jingwei as Kun Da
- Chang Kuo-chu as Lao Yu
- Marc Ma as Jia De
- Hu Lianxin as Mei Xin

==== Season 1 - Ghost Invitational (Episodes: 9-12) ====
- Chen Zheyuan as Yetian Hao'er/Noda Koji
- Cheng Xiao as Lu Qingqing
- Ma Boqian as Shan Ben You Tai
- Li Mingxuan as Liu Feng
- Cui Yuxin as Cheng Tianshun
- Huang Jianwei as Lao K
- Bryant Chang as Ah Ji
- Kao Yinghsuan as Diao Delong
- Ding Chuncheng as Wu Xichao
- Yen Tsao as Li Chang E
- Shi Mingshuai as Ma Guoqiang
- Wang Keyuan as Xiao Fei
- Ye Ziqi as Da Wang
- Suo Lang Mei Qi as Er Wang
- Dong Nina as San Wang
- Guo Jiamin as Si Wang
- Xiao Ai as Wu Wang
- Clara as Beauty

==== Season 2 - Angel's Melody (Episodes: 1-5) ====
- Yi Tian Xiong as Sha Ma
- Lynn Hung as Dai Xi
- Deng En Xi as Xiao Ai
- Fu Jun as Pianist
- He Nan as Miss Mao
- Zhou Chu Chu as Nan Xi
- Zhai Wen Bin as A Lai
- Jackson Lou as Hospital Director
- Marc Ma as An Song
- Ge Yi Ming as An Song (young)
- Wang Yi as Ying Hua
- Yuan Ya Xuan as Ying Hua (young)
- Shang Bo Jun as Ying Hua's stepfather
- Li Yun as Ying Hua's mother
- Tony Jaa as Jack Jaa
- Zhang Yishang as Sa Sha
- Zhou De Yang as Dentist

==== Season 2 - Devil's Breath (Episodes: 6-8) ====
- Raymond Chiu as Na Wen
- Meng Zhi Xu as Xiao Cha
- Tanny Tien as Huang Po
- Zhang Bo Jia as Tina
- Chang Shih as Du Lang
- Lei Guan Ming as Yan Jing
- Tian Yi Feng as Bi Tou
- Xu Dong as A Ming
- Zhou Hong as Man Di
- Cao Yang as A Ming's mother
- He Xin Lin as Huang Po's daughter
- Zheng Ying Xian as Huang Po's granddaughter
- Cheryl Yang as A Xin
- Jia Hong Wei as Ji Layu
- Sun Yi Ming as Kang Song
- Mei Xue as Na Mu
- AWAN ARSHAD IQBAL as Ao Yi

==== Season 2 - Amusement Park (Episodes: 9-12) ====
- Yvonne Yung as Wang Jiaoyun
- Alex To Delfino as Fa Nan
- Rong Zishan as Neo
- Li Xing Yao as Shao Feifei
- Chen Hua Feng as Chen Yixin
- Yang Tian Ming as Xu Jiayuan
- Wang Yi as Shao Feifei's mother
- Bu Wen Hui as Shao Feifei's father
- Min Jian as Li Can
- Michael Tong as Zhuang Yan
- Wang Yi Lun as Wu Zhiyuan
- Rao Xue Jing as Wang Xiaoke
- Lu Mian Da as Receptionist Manager
- Sun Yi Han as Fang Siya
- Zhang Bo Jia as Tina

==== Season 2 - Golden City (Episodes: 13-16) ====
- Jackie Lui as Chen Jinghan
- Xia Zi Xuan as Chen Jinghan (young)
- Yvonne Yung as Wang Jiaoyun
- Zhang Bo Jia as Tina
- Yue Xin as Qiao Shanshan
- Yin Zi Wei as Huang Hai
- Andrew Lien as Qiao Qingshan
- Li Xiang as Hui Jiezhi
- Min Jian as Li Can
- Chen Hua Feng as Chen Yixin
- Yang Tian Ming as Xu Jiayuan
- Jiang Yun Lin as Ouyang Zhi
- Hu Hao Fan as Police
- Yang Tian Qi as Police
- Yang Ming Yi as Chen Jinghan's father
- He Yu Tong as Chen Jinghan's mother
- Ding Si Bo as Chen Jinghan's younger brother
- Qiao Hua as Chen Jinghan's younger sister

== Production ==
=== Season 1 ===
Shooting began in December 2018 and lasted 114 days, with total length of more than 2000 hours shooting. Filming locations included Bangkok, Kaohsiung, and Tokyo. The largest scene film utilized more than 800 actors at once, with the set area exceeding 11,000 square meters. Shooting also mobilized military helicopters and a Boeing 747 for specific scenes.

=== Season 2 ===
Shooting began on August 7, 2022 and finished on October 7, 2022. Filming locations included Shenzhen, Guangdong province, Jiangmen and Macau.

== Original soundtrack ==
=== Season 1 ===
The original soundtrack to season 1 was released on January 1, 2020 by Yitong Productions. A total of 53 tracks were released.

No.	Title	Artist	Length
1.	"Obsession"	NZBZ	4:39
2.	"Don't Believe It Easily (I Don't Believe You)"	Chen Zheyuan / Cheng Xiao / Victor Ma / Li Mingxuan / Cui Yuxin	3:20
3.	"Moment, or Possess"	Sage	4:29
4.	"Darkness and Light"	Peng Weihan	3:53
5.	"Obsession (Instrumental)"	NZBZ	4:39
6.	"Don't Believe It Easily (I Don't Believe You) [Instrumental]"	Chen Zheyuan / Cheng Xiao / Victor Ma / Li Mingxuan / Cui Yuxin	3:20
7.	"Moment, or Possess (Accompaniment)"	Chen Zheyuan / Cheng Xiao / Victor Ma / Li Mingxuan / Cui Yuxin	4:29
8.	"Darkness and Light (Instrumental)"	Peng Weihan	3:53
9.	"Four-Faced Buddha"	Hu Xiaoou	3:02
10.	"Oppression and Suffocation"	Hu Xiaoou	2:12
11.	"Mystery and Shock"	Hu Xiaoou	2:47
12.	"Quiet, Stealth and Running"	Hu Xiaoou	3:29
13.	"Roaring and Fighting like a Wild Beast"	Hu Xiaoou	2:28
14.	"The Name of the Rose"	Hu Xiaoou	2:35
15.	"Hum and Chase"	Hu Xiaoou	2:12
16.	"Clue"	Hu Xiaoou	2:13
17.	"In The Dark"	Hu Xiaoou	3:24
18.	"Aria in the Dark Night, Movement 1"	Hu Xiaoou	4:05
19.	"Endless Game"	Hu Xiaoou	2:17
20.	"Aria in the Dark Night, Movement 2"	Hu Xiaoou	4:39
21.	"Waltz of Withering"	Hu Xiaoou	3:02
22.	"Fantasy"	Hu Xiaoou	2:51
23.	"A Desperate Struggle"	Hu Xiaoou	1:53
24.	"Darkest Moment"	Wang Zongxian	1:06
25.	"Black Drama"	Hu Xiaoou	2:53
26.	"The Storm is Coming"	Hu Xiaoou	2:28
27.	"Riddle"	Hu Xiaoou	1:53
28.	"Variation"	Hu Xiaoou	2:56
29.	"Endless Game"	Hu Xiaoou	2:17
30.	"Investigating the Crime Scene"	Wang Zongxian	1:59
31.	"Forensics"	Wang Zongxian	1:53
32.	"Before You Even Notice"	Lin Wei	1:21
33.	"Last Resort"	Wang Zongxian	2:07
34.	"Makes It Look Like A Suicide"	Wang Zongxian	1:08
35.	"Cha-Cha With the Liar"	Lin Wei	1:34
36.	"He Must Be A Pervert Killer"	Wang Zongxian	1:11
37.	"Lady Drugs the Kids-Prank"	Ren Yingjie	2:47
38.	"Dance With Spirits"	Wang Zongxian	2:26
39.	"Fall For You"	Cydney Ee	2:32
40.	"Idiot Classmates"	Wang Zongxian	1:05
41.	"Viewing the Surveillance Tape"	Wang Zongxian	3:27
42.	"Lady in Red"	Ren Yingjie / Wang Zongxian	1:37
43.	"Ivy Interogates Lin Mo"	Wang Zongxian	2:13
44.	"Your Smile"	Lin Wei	3:14
45.	"Status Quo Overturned"	Wang Zongxian	1:33
46.	"Recalling the Day of the Incident (What Happened)"	Wang Zongxian	1:16
47.	"Wow-Oh"	Liu Ming	1:40
48.	"Mr. Smiley Face Reveals"	Wang Zongxian	1:19
49.	"Operation Catch Begins"	Wang Zongxian	1:30
50.	"Presenting Evidence"	Wang Zongxian	2:13
51.	"Seeing Ghosts"	Ren Yingjie / Wang Zongxian	1:57
52.	"Goodbye"	Wang Zongxian	1:08
53.	"Private Investigator"	Wang Zongxian	1:10

=== Season 2 ===
The original soundtrack to season 2 was released on March 8, 2024. A total of 55 tracks were released.

No.	Title	Artist	Length
1.	"Unforgettable"	Zhao Qi	3:17
2.	"Rumo"	Yan Bingyi	4:38
3.	"Y."	Sage	3:57
4.	"Tess"	Wang Lu	2:10
5.	"Neo Rosa"	Jason Gertel	1:56
6.	"Dark Web"	Hu Xiaoou	2:22
7.	"Riddle"	Hu Xiaoou	2:29
8.	"The Code of the Black Angel"	Hu Xiaoou	2:56
9.	"Challenge"	Hu Xiaoou	2:44
10.	"Data World"	Hu Xiaoou	2:54
11.	"Amusement Park"	Hu Xiaoou	3:16
12.	"Phantom of the Pianist"	Hu Xiaoou	3:25
13.	"Riddle II"	Hu Xiaoou	2:21
14.	"Devils Breath"	Hu Xiaoou	3:25
15.	"The Hidden Grudges Entangled"	Hu Xiaoou	3:47
16.	"The Call of Dreams"	Hu Xiaoou	3:30
17.	"Fengmo"	Hu Xiaoou	2:25
18.	"Shadow of the Rose"	Hu Xiaoou	3:08
19.	"Angel's Melody"	Hu Xiaoou	4:27
20.	"The World of Madmen"	Hu Xiaoou	2:25
21.	"HELP ME"	Hu Xiaoou	1:28
22.	"Different Space Confrontation"	Hu Xiaoou	1:38
23.	"Subconscious"	Hu Xiaoou	1:54
24.	"Sad Clown"	Hu Xiaoou	1:58
25.	"Invasion"	Hu Xiaoou	2:03
26.	"As Gentle as the Night"	Hu Xiaoou	2:16
27.	"DEAD NOW"	Hu Xiaoou	2:24
28.	"Drifting"	Hu Xiaoou	2:53
29.	"Kiko"	Hu Xiaoou	1:54
30.	"The World of the World"	Cheng Binghan	2:41
31.	"Unforgettable (Instrumental)"	Zhao Qi	3:17
32.	"Like Foam (Accompaniment)"	Yan Bingyi	4:38
33.	"Y. (Accompaniment)"	Sage	3:57
34.	"Waltz of Q"	Hu Xiaoou	1:54
35.	"Psycho Arrested"	Wang Zongxian	1:37
36.	"Closure for Kiko"	Wang Zongxian	2:06
37.	"Mystery Deepens"	Wang Zongxian	2:18
38.	"Gazed by the Angel's Melody"	Wang Zongxian	2:23
39.	"Escaping the Hard Way"	Wang Zongxian	3:08
40.	"Wrap Up The Truth"	Wang Zongxian	1:11
41.	"Being Pyscho Perverted"	Wang Zongxian	2:06
42.	"Meeting with the Pianist"	Wang Zongxian	1:10
43.	"Session with the Doctor"	Wang Zongxian	2:46
44.	"Dark Dark Web"	Wang Zongxian	1:58
45.	"Kiko is Unrelenting"	Wang Zongxian	0:56
46.	"Escaping Angel House"	Wang Zongxian	1:47
47.	"Kiko Understands"	Wang Zongxian	1:19
48.	"Kiko in Trouble"	Wang Zongxian	1:23
49.	"The Chase - The Truth Behind the Mountain"	Wang Zongxian	3:03
50.	"Investigating the Mansion"	Wang Zongxian	1:35
51.	"Suspicion in the Corridors"	Wang Zongxian	1:08
52.	"Death All Around Us"	Wang Zongxian	1:19
53.	"Interesting Patients"	Wang Zongxian	3:53
54.	"Fall For You"	Wang Zongxian	2:34
55.	"The One"	Wang Zongxian	1:09
56.	"Kiko in Action"	Wang Zongxian	1:11
57.	"Another Day in the Hospital"	Wang Zongxian	0:44
58.	"Happy Times"	Wang Zongxian	1:13
59.	"Madhouse Cuckoo Dance"	Wang Zongxian	1:05
60.	"The World (Instrumental)"	Cheng Binghan	2:41

== Reception ==
The first season currently holds a 7.0 with an average of 4 out of 5 stars on Douban with more than 300,000 user reviews. Website MyDramaList users rated the season a 7.9, praising the detective storyline and character development, particularly highlighting the show's acting.

In 2020 the first season was a part of the 9th iQIYI All-Star Carnival: Top Ten Television Series.

The second season currently holds a 6.1 with an average of 3 out of 5 stars on Douban with over 60,000 user reviews. Website MyDramaList users rated the season 7.9, praising the character development of the main protagonists and the strong story themes throughout.
