= Zhao Lusi =

Chinese actress (born 1998)

- 赵露思
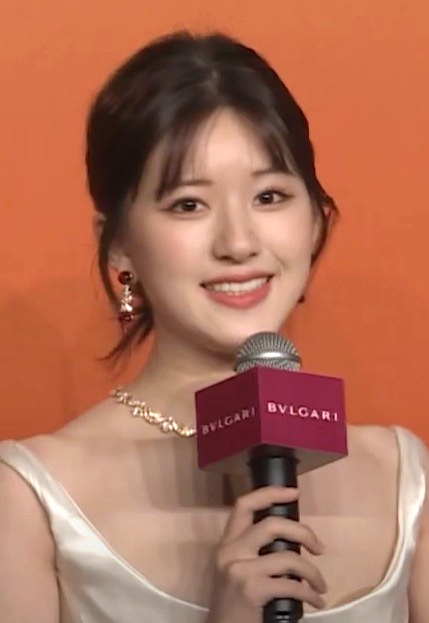
- Zhao in 2023
- Born: November 9, 1998 (age 27); Chengdu, Sichuan, China
- Other name: Rosy Zhao
- Education: MingDao University
- Occupation: Actress
- Years active: 2016–present

Chinese name
- Traditional Chinese: 趙露思
- Simplified Chinese: 赵露思
Transcriptions
Standard Mandarin
- Hanyu Pinyin: Zhào Lùsī

Zhao Lusi (Chinese: 赵露思; born November 9, 1998), also known as Rosy Zhao, is a Chinese actress and singer. She is known for her roles in The Romance of Tiger and Rose (2020), Dating in the Kitchen (2020), The Long Ballad (2021), Who Rules the World (2022), Love Like the Galaxy (2022), Hidden Love (2023), The Story of Pearl Girl (2024), and Love's Ambition (2025).

== Career ==
=== Beginnings ===
Zhao entered the entertainment industry by co-hosting the variety program Huo Xing Qing Bao Ju (Mars Intelligence Agency).

In 2017, Zhao made her acting debut with a supporting role in the web drama Cinderella Chef. The same year, she played a minor role in the film City of Rock.

=== Rising popularity ===
In 2018, Zhao gained attention for her supporting role in the historical romance series Untouchable Lovers. The same year, she played her first leading role in the time-travel historical drama Oh! My Emperor. The series gained popularity and led to increased recognition for Zhao. Zhao received the Newcomer award at the Golden Bud–The Third Network Film And Television Festival.

In 2019, Zhao was featured in the romance film Autumn Fairytale, based on the South Korean television series Autumn in My Heart. The same year, she starred in period fantasy Prodigy Healer, and historical romance Love Better Than Immortality. She later starred in the romance drama I Hear You with Riley Wang.

In 2020, Zhao starred in the xianxia series Love of Thousand Years. She then starred in historical romance drama The Romance of Tiger and Rose. The series was a hit, and was praised for its interesting setup and plot. She won the Best Leading Actress award at 2020 Wenrong Awards. The same year, she starred in the romance drama Dating in the Kitchen.

In 2021, Zhao starred as the second female lead in the historical series The Long Ballad, which gained her the Asian Star Prize at 2021 Seoul International Drama Awards. Then she played the lead role in the romantic comedy Please Feel at Ease Mr. Ling, and starred in the period drama A Female Student Arrives at the Imperial College.

In 2022, she starred in the wuxia fantasy romance drama Who Rules The World with Yang Yang, based on the novel by Qing Lengyue, and starred in the historical romance drama Love Like the Galaxy alongside Wu Lei, based on the novel, Xing Han Can Lan, Xing Shen Zhi Zai by Guan Xin Ze Luan.

She also led the drama Gen Z alongside Wu Gang, Luo Yi Zhou, Alina Zhang, and Jiang Shan. In 2023, Zhao was named by Versace as its new global brand ambassador, with the chief creative officer Donatella Versace saying "I am thrilled Rosy is joining our Versace family, i love her style, her energy and her spirit, she is a powerful Versace woman". On June 22, 2024, the film There's a Kiosk by the Clouds, in which she co-starred with Peng Yuchang and Zhou Yuya, was released nationwide, in which she played the role of Cherry, the owner of the coffee shop. On October 11, the released song "You R" was put online; on October 12, she took part in the program 2024 Shake It Up Good and Wonderful Night, performing the song "You R". on October 15, she was listed on the Vogue Gala's announced full lineup list. On October 15, the official full lineup list for the Vogue Gala was announced. On November 1, starred in the TV series The Story of Pearl Girl. In May 2024, she was announced as one of the torchbearers for the 2024 Summer Olympics.

=== Hiatus and return ===
In December 2024, Zhao suspended all professional activities due to health issues, revealing that she had been battling depression since 2019. Her friends alleged that she had experienced workplace abuse at her management agency. On January 25, 2025, Zhao made her first appearance since her recovery at a public charity event. In March, the Mango TV reality show Be Myself, which documented her recovery trip, began airing but was pulled after three episodes amid controversy over remarks she made while visiting a rural village, including asking a country girl whether she had ever posed for art photos.

On August 4, 2025, Zhao went public with her contractual dispute with her agency, alleging that it had made unauthorized withdrawals from her personal studio's account and left her to shoulder financial debts, despite its earlier claims that it would take responsibility for the canceled endorsements while she was seeking treatment for health issues in 2024.

In October 2025, it was reported the Zhao would be signing under Alibaba's entertainment division, Hujin DME. As part of the contract, it would help Zhao with the contract termination matters with her former management agency in exchange of a two-year mentorship for its trainees. Additionally, it had secured roles for Zhao in several television series as well, paving the way for her to return to the Chinese entertainment industry. At the end of the month, Zhao released "Black Veil Bride" and "Don't Wanna Know", English songs which were also produced by Brian Lee.

== Filmography ==
=== Film ===
Year	Title		Role	Notes	Ref.
Year	English	Original	Role	Notes	Ref.
2017	City of Rock	缝纫机乐队	Nurse	Guest appearance	
2019	Autumn Fairy Tale	蓝色生死恋	Enxi		
2021	1921	1921	Liu Qingyang		

=== Television series ===
Year	Title		Role	Ref.
Year	English	Original	Role	Ref.
2018	Untouchable Lovers	凤囚凰	Ma Xueyun	
2018	Cinderella Chef	萌妻食神	Liu Yiyi	
2018	Oh! My Emperor	哦！我的皇帝陛下	Luo Feifei	
2019	I Hear You	最动听的事	Bei Erduo	
2019	Prodigy Healer	青囊传	Ye Yunshang	
2019	Love Better Than Immortality	天雷一部之春花秋月	Chun Hua	
2020	Love of Thousand Years	三千鸦杀	Qin Chuan	
2020	The Romance of Tiger and Rose	传闻中的陈芊芊	Chen Xiaoqian	
2020	Dating in the Kitchen	我，喜欢你	Gu Shengnan	
2021	The Long Ballad	长歌行	Li Leyan / Yong An	
2021	Please Feel at Ease Mr. Ling	一不小心捡到爱	Gu Anxin	
2021	A Female Student Arrives at the Imperial College	国子监来了个女弟子	Sang Qi	
2022	Who Rules The World	且试天下	Feng Xiyun / Bai Fengxi	
2022	Love Like the Galaxy	星汉灿烂·月升沧海	Cheng Shaoshang	
2022	Hu Tong	胡同	Tian Zao	
2023	Gen Z	后浪	Sun Toutou	
2023	Hidden Love	偷偷藏不住	Sang Zhi	
2023	The Last Immortal	神隐	A Yin / Feng Yin	
2024	The Story of Pearl Girl	珠帘玉幕	Duan Wu / Su Muzhe	
2025	Love's Ambition	许我耀眼	Xu Yan	
TBA	Almost Lover	恋人	Ruan Yu	

=== Variety shows ===
Year	Title		Roles
Year	English	Original	Roles
2016	Mars Intelligence Agency 2	火星情报局2	Joined as Intermediate Agent
2017	Mars Intelligence Agency 3	火星情报局3	Joined as Intermediate Agent
2019	Mars Intelligence Agency 4	火星情报局4	Joined as Senior Agent
2019	Real Actor	演技派	Joined as contestant
2019	iQIYI Fans Carnival Sports Games	爱奇艺粉丝粉丝嘉年华	Joined as contestant

== Discography ==
=== Singles ===
List of singles, showing year released and album name
Title	Year	Album	Remarks
"青春必修课" (Necessary Lessons of Youth)	2020	—N/a	Collaboration with Lu Yupeng
"饮水机" (Water Fountain Mandarin Version)	2021	—N/a	Collaboration with Alec Benjamin
"仲夏夜之梦" (Midnight Summer's Dream)	2021	Midsummer Night's Dream	Collaboration with Vava
"有你在" (You Are My Light)	2023	—N/a	—N/a
"Black Veil Bride"	2025	Black Veil Bride	Produced by Brian Lee
"Don't Wanna Know"	2025	Black Veil Bride	Produced by Brian Lee

=== Soundtrack appearances ===
List of soundtrack appearances, showing year released and album name
Title	Year	Album
"好像掉进爱情海里" (Love Drops into the River)	2018	Oh! My Emperor OST
"恋爱脑少女" (Love Brain Young Girl)	2019	Love Better Than Immortality OST
"时光话" (Time)	2020	The Romance of Tiger and Rose OST
"我喜欢你" (I Like You)	2020	Dating in the Kitchen OST
"多麼願你是我恆久的歌" (I Wish You Were My Lasting Song)	2021	The Long Ballad OST
"撿到你的下雨天" (Picked Up You On A Rainy Day)	2021	Please Feel At Ease Mr Ling OST
"此生予你" (For You In This Life)	2021	Female Student Arrives At The Imperial College OST
“只想偷偷把你藏好" (I Just Want To Hide You Secretly)	2023	Hidden Love OST (Collaboration with Silence Wang)
"我有喜歡的人了" (I Have A Crush)	2023	Hidden Love OST
"隱心" (Hidden Heart)	2023	The Last Immortal OST

== Accolades ==
=== Awards and nominations ===
Year	Award	Category	Nomination	Results	Ref.
2019	Golden Bud - The Third Network Film And Television Festival	Newcomer Award	Oh! My Emperor	Won	
2020	7th The Actors of China Awards Ceremony	Best Actress (Web series)	The Romance of Tiger and Rose	Nominated	
2020	29th Huading Awards	Best Newcomer	The Romance of Tiger and Rose	Nominated	
2020	29th Huading Awards	Best Actress (Chinese Historical Theme Drama)	The Romance of Tiger and Rose	Nominated	
2020	Hengdian Film and TV Festival of China	Best Actress	The Romance of Tiger and Rose	Won	
2020	Tencent Video All Star Awards 2020	Breakthrough Actors of the Year	The Romance of Tiger and Rose	Won	
2021	2nd People's Daily Digital Communication and Fusion Screen Ceremony	Dynamic Actress	N/A	Won	
2021	Douyin Star Night 2021	Shining Artist of the Year	N/A	Won	
2021	Seoul International Drama Awards	Asian Star Award	The Long Ballad	Won	
2022	18th Chinese American TV Festival - Golden Angel Award	Outstanding Actress	Love Like the Galaxy	Won	
2022	13th Macau International TV Festival	Best Leading Actress	Love Like the Galaxy	Nominated	
2022	35th Huading Awards	Best Actress (Chinese Historical Theme Drama)	Love Like the Galaxy	Nominated	
2022	Weibo TV & Internet Video Summit 2022	Outstanding Actor/Actress of the Year	N/A	Won	
2022	AsiaN 2022 Editor's Pick Awards	Chemistry Michelin Award	Who Rules the World	Won	

=== Listicles ===
Year	Publisher	Listicle	Placement	Ref.
2025	Asia-Pacific Entrepreneurs Association (APEA)	Asia-Pacific U30 Outstanding Young Leaders	Included	
