= A-Lin discography =

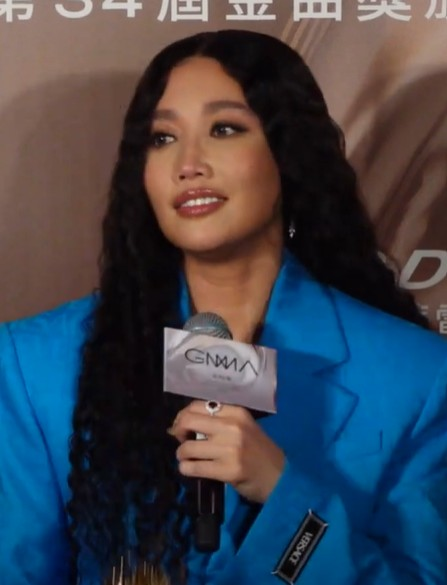
- A-Lin at the 34th Golden Melody Awards
- Studio albums: 9
- EPs: 3
- Compilation albums: 1
- Live albums: 1

This is the discography of Taiwanese singer A-Lin (Chinese: 黃麗玲). She debuted in 2006 with the album Lovelorn, Not Guilty. Her 2018 single "A Kind of Sorrow" (有一種悲傷) topped the singles chart in Singapore for three consecutive weeks.

== Albums ==
=== Studio albums ===
List of studio albums, with release date, label, and sales shown
Title	Album details	Peak chart positions
Title	Album details	TWN
Lovelorn, Not Guilty (失戀無罪)	Released: February 10, 2006; Label: Avex Taiwan; Formats: CD, digital download, streaming	20
Diva (天生歌姬)	Released: August 15, 2008; Label: Avex Taiwan; Formats: CD, digital download, streaming	13
Before, After (以前 以後)	Released: December 28, 2009; Label: Avex Taiwan; Formats: CD, digital download, streaming	6
Loneliness Is Not the Hardest Part (寂寞不痛)	Released: December 24, 2010; Label: Avex Taiwan; Formats: CD, digital download, streaming	—
We Will Be Better (我們會更好的)	Released: November 18, 2011; Label: Avex Taiwan; Formats: CD, digital download, streaming	6
Happiness, Then What (幸福了 然後呢)	Released: December 30, 2012; Label: Avex Taiwan; Formats: CD, digital download, streaming	4
Guilt (罪惡感)	Released: December 30, 2014; Label: Sony Music Taiwan; Formats: CD, digital download, streaming	—
A-Lin (A-Lin同名專輯)	Released: September 20, 2017; Label: Sony Music Taiwan; Formats: CD, digital download, streaming	—
Link	Released: April 8, 2022; Label: Sony Music Taiwan; Formats: CD, digital download, streaming	—

=== Compilation albums ===
Title	Album details	Peak chart positions
Title	Album details	TWN
A-Lin - Everlasting...Best and More	Released: October 29, 2014; Label: Avex Taiwan; Formats: CD, DVD, digital download	5
All the Best	Released: August 28, 2015; Label: Avex Taiwan; Formats: CD, DVD, digital download	—
A-Lin Love Songs 10th Anniversary Edition	Released: August 19, 2016; Label: Avex Taiwan; Formats: CD, DVD, digital download	—

=== Live albums ===
Title	Album details
A-Lin Sonar: World Tour Concert	Released: January 6, 2017; Label: Sony Music Taiwan; Formats: CD, DVD, blu-ray, digital download

== Extended plays ==
Title	Album details
Love, How Should I Go? (愛 請問怎麼走)	Released: June 8, 2007; Label: Avex Taiwan; Formats: CD, digital download, streaming

== Singles ==
=== As lead artist ===
List of singles
Title	Year	Album
"Lovelorn, Not Guilty" (失恋无罪)	2006	Lovelorn, Not Guilty
"Four Seasons" (四季)	2006	Lovelorn, Not Guilty
"P.S. I Love You" (P.S.我爱你)	2008	Diva
"Breaking Up Takes Practice" (分手需要练习的)	2009	Before, After
"Xian Zai Wo Hen Xing Fu" (现在我很幸福)	2009	Before, After
"Before, After" (以前, 以后)	2009	Before, After
"Give Me a Reason to Forget" (给我一个理由忘记)	2010	Loneliness Is Not the Hardest Part
"Loneliness Is Not the Hardest Part" (寂寞不痛)	2010	Loneliness Is Not the Hardest Part
"Da Da de Yong Bao" (大大的拥抱)	2011	We Will Be Better
"I'm Busy" (我很忙)	2011	We Will Be Better
"Happiness, Then What" (幸福了 然后呢)	2012	Happiness, Then What
"920" (featuring Xiao Yu)	2012	Happiness, Then What
"A Best Friend's Blessings" (好朋友的祝福)	2012	Happiness, Then What
"What Was Taken" (拿走了什麼)	2014	Guilt
"Guilt" (罪恶感)	2014	Guilt
"Nan De Gu Ji" (难得孤寂)	2014	Guilt
"Pseudo-Single, Yet Single" (未单身)	2017	A-Lin
"Go" (一直走)	2017	A-Lin
"A Kind of Sorrow" (有一種悲傷)	2018	More Than Blue OST
"Dancing in the Sky" (一舞鍾情)	2018	Non-album singles
"Rainbow" (雨後彩虹)	2019	Non-album singles
"Passenger"	2019	Non-album singles
"Parallel Crossed" (with Zhang Zining)	2020	Non-album singles
"Turn" (盡情旋轉)	2021	Link
"Best Friend" (挚友)	2022	Link
"Conversation" (聊聊天)	2022	Link
"Loveholic" (扑火)	2023	Non-album single
"Grieving Record" (哀情记)	2023	Love You Seven Times OST
"Three-line Poem for the Moon" (给月亮的三行诗)	2023	Rising With the Wind OST
"—" denotes releases that did not chart, was not released in that region, or chart did not exist.
