= Ding Yuxi =

Chinese actor and model

- 丁禹兮
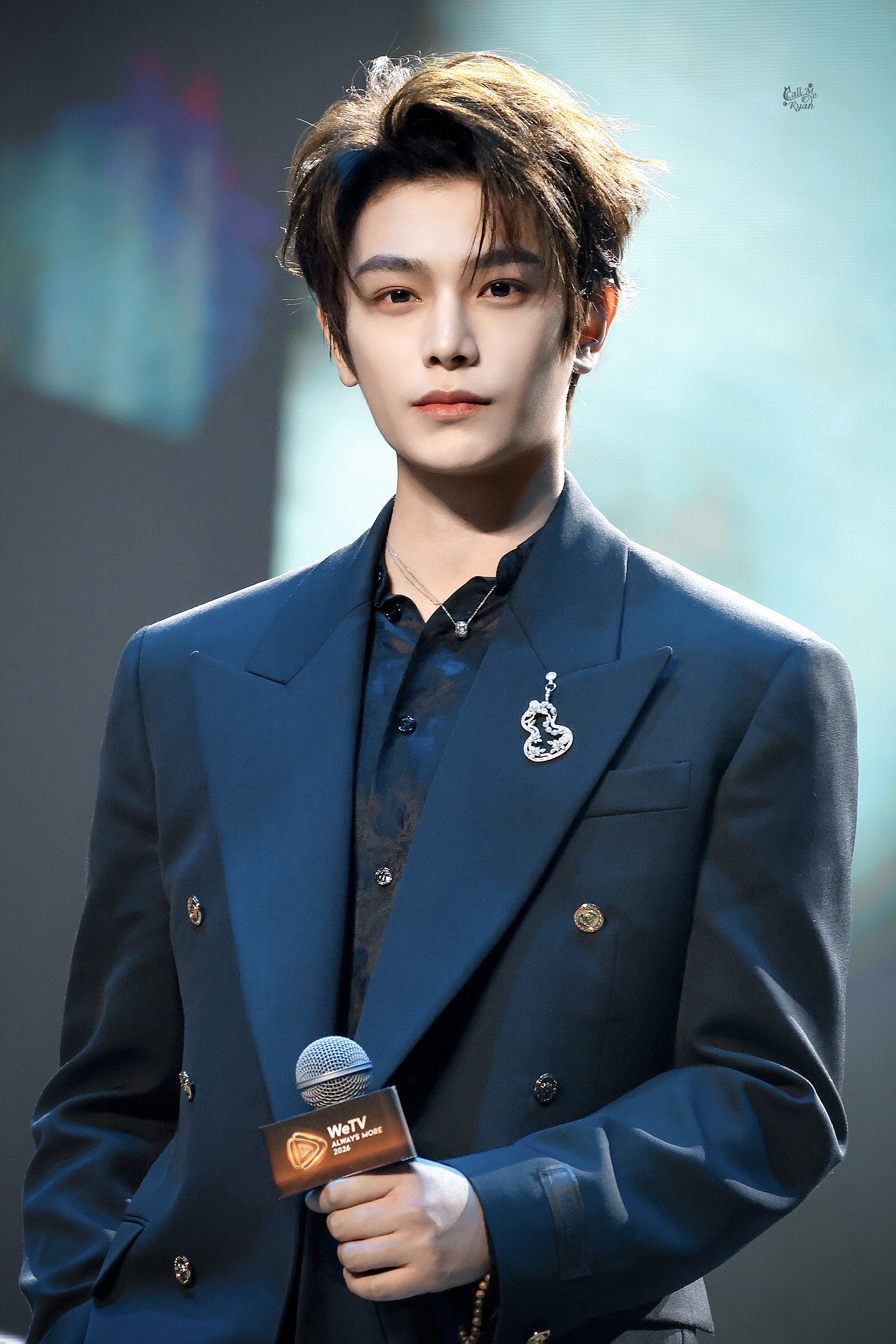
- Ding at an event in Thailand on November 4, 2025
- Born: 20 July 1995 (age 31); Shanghai, China
- Education: Shanghai Theatre Academy
- Occupation: Actor
- Years active: 2017—present
- Agent: Enlight Media

Chinese name
- Traditional Chinese: 丁禹兮
- Simplified Chinese: 丁禹兮
Transcriptions
Standard Mandarin
- Hanyu Pinyin: Dīng Yǔ Xī
Yue: Cantonese
- Jyutping: Ding1 Yu5-Hai4

Ding Yuxi (Chinese: 丁禹兮; born 20 July 1995), also known as Ryan Ding, is a Chinese actor. He gained recognition for his role as Han Shuo in The Romance of Tiger and Rose (2020). He is also known for his roles in Intense Love (2020), Moonlight (2021), Love You Seven Times (2023), Melody of Golden Age (2024), Love Game in Eastern Fantasy (2024), and Southern Archives (2026).

== Career ==
=== Beginnings ===
In 2013, Ding was admitted to the Shanghai Film Art Academy, majoring in Theatre, Film and Television Acting. Later, he entered the College of Continuing Education of Shanghai Theatre Academy, majoring in Directing.

=== Rising popularity ===
In 2018, Ding gained attention for his supporting role of Dongfang Bubai in the drama New Smiling Proud Wanderer. During the same year, he participated in the variety show, PhantaCity, where guests perform an immersive performance stage, with music performance as the main form. Later that year he also participated in I Actor, a variety show where rookie actors and actresses improve their acting skills along with strengthening their morals. The strongest 8 will be chosen at the end and have a drama specially designed for them. Ding eventually won first place.

In 2019, Ding starred in the web drama, Just an Encore. He later on starred as the male lead in the drama, Reset Life, the drama starring the 8 final winners of I Actor.

In 2020, Ding starred in the romance drama Intense Love as a doctor. He then starred in historical romance drama The Romance of Tiger and Rose with Zhao Lusi. The series was a hit, and was praised for its interesting setup and plot. Ding started gaining increased popularity for starring in these two dramas, receiving the title of "May Boyfriend".

In May 2021, Ding starred in the romantic comedy drama Moonlight alongside Yu Shuxin.

In November 2024, Ding reunited in Love Game in Eastern Fantasy based on the novel The Guide to Capturing a Black Lotus premiering on Tencent Video and WeTV. The series received a Douban rating of 7.7 out of 10, the highest score for a Chinese fantasy series in 2024. It also received high ratings on international streaming platforms such as Rakuten Viki with a rating of 9.4. Due to his huge skyrocket in popularity from this role, he was invited to cover "Ning Mou (凝眸)" (originally performed by Zhang Yuan), a song from the Love Game in Eastern Fantasy OST, on the music competition show he was hosting, The Next Singer. The cast reunited for a 3-episode variety show, The Shining Stars, embarking on 3-day, 2-night trip to Weizhou Island.

== Filmography ==
=== Film ===
Year	English title	Chinese title	Role	Notes/Ref.
2017	The Game of Asura	修罗的游戏	Cha Jian	Web film
2017	My Vampire Senior	我的吸血鬼学姐	Liu Chuan	Web film
2017	The Last Demon	最后一个恶魔	Chu Yuan	Web film
2022	Ten Years of Loving You	十年一品温如言	Yan Xi	
2024	Betwixt and Between	"小"人物	Li Yi	
2026	Game of Identity	天才游戏	Chen Lun	

=== Television series ===
Year	English title	Chinese title	Role	Network	Notes/Ref.
2018	New Smiling Proud Wanderer	新笑傲江湖	Dongfang Bubai	Youku	
2019	Just an Encore	八分钟的温暖	He Xinliang	Tencent	Web series
2019	Reset Life	未来的秘密	Cai Tianmu	iQIYI	Web series
2020	Serenade of Peaceful Joy	清平乐	Su Shi	Hunan TV, Tencent	
2020	Intense Love	韫色过浓	Zhou Shiyun	Mango TV	Web series
2020	The Romance of Tiger and Rose	传闻中的陈芊芊	Han Shuo	Tencent	Web series
2021	Moonlight	月光变奏曲	Zhou Chuan	iQIYI	
2023	Romance of a Twin Flower	春闺梦里人	Ning Yuxuan	Tencent, Zhejiang TV	
2023	Love You Seven Times	七时吉祥	Chu Kong / Lu Changkong	iQIYI	
2024	White Cat Legend	大理寺少卿游	Li Bing	iQIYI	Web series
2024	Melody of Golden Age	长乐曲	Shen Du	Hunan TV, Mango TV	
2024	Love Game in Eastern Fantasy	永夜星河	Mu Sheng / Fu Zhou	Tencent	Web series
2024	Black and White Forest	黑白森林	Wen Binbin	Tencent	Web series
2025	Love in Pavilion	淮水竹亭	Zhang Zheng	iQIYI	Support role
2025	Fight for Love	山河枕	Wei Yun	Tencent	
2026	Archives: The Nanyang Mystery	南部档案	Zhang Haixia	iQIYI	Web series
TBA	The Road to Splendor	花开锦绣	Zhao Ling	Tencent	
TBA	The Palace Stewardess	司宫令	Zhao Ai	Tencent	
TBA	Endless Summers	爱在无尽夏	Shen Yan	Tencent	

=== Variety shows ===
Year	English title	Chinese title	Role	Network	Notes/Ref.
2018	Phantacity	幻乐之城	Supporting Actor	Tencent Video	
2018	I Actor	演员的品格	Contestant	iQIYI	
2020	Heart Signal 3	心动的信号 第三季	Judge Panelist	Tencent Video	
2024	The Next Singer	下一战歌手	Main Host	Hunan TV	
2024	The Shining Stars	闪耀的恒星	Himself	Tencent Video	

== Discography ==
=== Singles ===
Year	Title	Peak chart positions	Notes/Ref.
Year	Title	CHN	Notes/Ref.
2019	"Light of Hope" (希望的光)	—	Just an Encore OST
2020	"Already In Love" (早就心动了) (with Zhang Yuxi)	—	Intense Love OST
2020	"着迷 Lost in Me" (with Nene, Hu Jiaxin, Hu Ma'er, Kang Xi, Li Jiaen and Wu Yalu)	—	As guest performer for Mission 3 of CHUANG 2020
2021	"Heartless Poems" (无心之诗)	—	Moonlight OST
2024	"Heavenly Capital Workers" (神都打工人) (with Zhou Qi, Ding Jiawen, Zhang Yicong, Feng Man and Kuddusjan Anwaer)	—	White Cat Legend OST
2024	"Only Want You" (只愿你一人) (with Deng Enxi)	69	Melody of Golden Age OST
2024	"Ji Ming Yue" (寄明月) (with Yu Shuxin, Zhu Xudan, Yang Shize, Fei Qiming, Li Yizhen and Lu Yuhao)	7	Promotional song for Love Game in Eastern Fantasy
2024	"Stare Intently" (凝眸)	48	Love Game in Eastern Fantasy OST
2024	"What You Mean To Me" (你之于我)	14	Love Game in Eastern Fantasy OST
2024	"Dissipating Dialogue" (消散对白)	4	Single
2024	"He Doesn't Understand" (他不懂)	33	Single

== Awards and nominations ==
Year	Award	Category	Nominated work	Result	Ref.
2020	Esquire China's 17th Man At His Best Award	Newcomer of the Year	—N/a	Won	
2020	Tencent Video All Star Night 2020	Promising TV Drama Actor of the Year	The Romance of Tiger and Rose	Won	
2021	China TV Drama Awards 2020	Young and New Force Actor	The Romance of Tiger and Rose; Intense Love	Won	
2021	Tencent Entertainment White Paper Awards 2020	Best Newcomer of the Year	The Romance of Tiger and Rose	Won	
2021	Weibo Movie Night 2021	Promising Actor of the Year	—N/a	Won	
2025	Tencent Video All Star Night 2024	Breakthrough Artist of the Year	Love Game in Eastern Fantasy; Black and White Forest	Won	
2025	Tencent Video All Star Night 2024	VIP Star of the Year	Love Game in Eastern Fantasy; Black and White Forest	Won	
2025	Weibo Awards 2024	Notable Actor of the Year	—N/a	Won	
