= Esther Yu =

Chinese actress (born 1995)

- 虞书欣
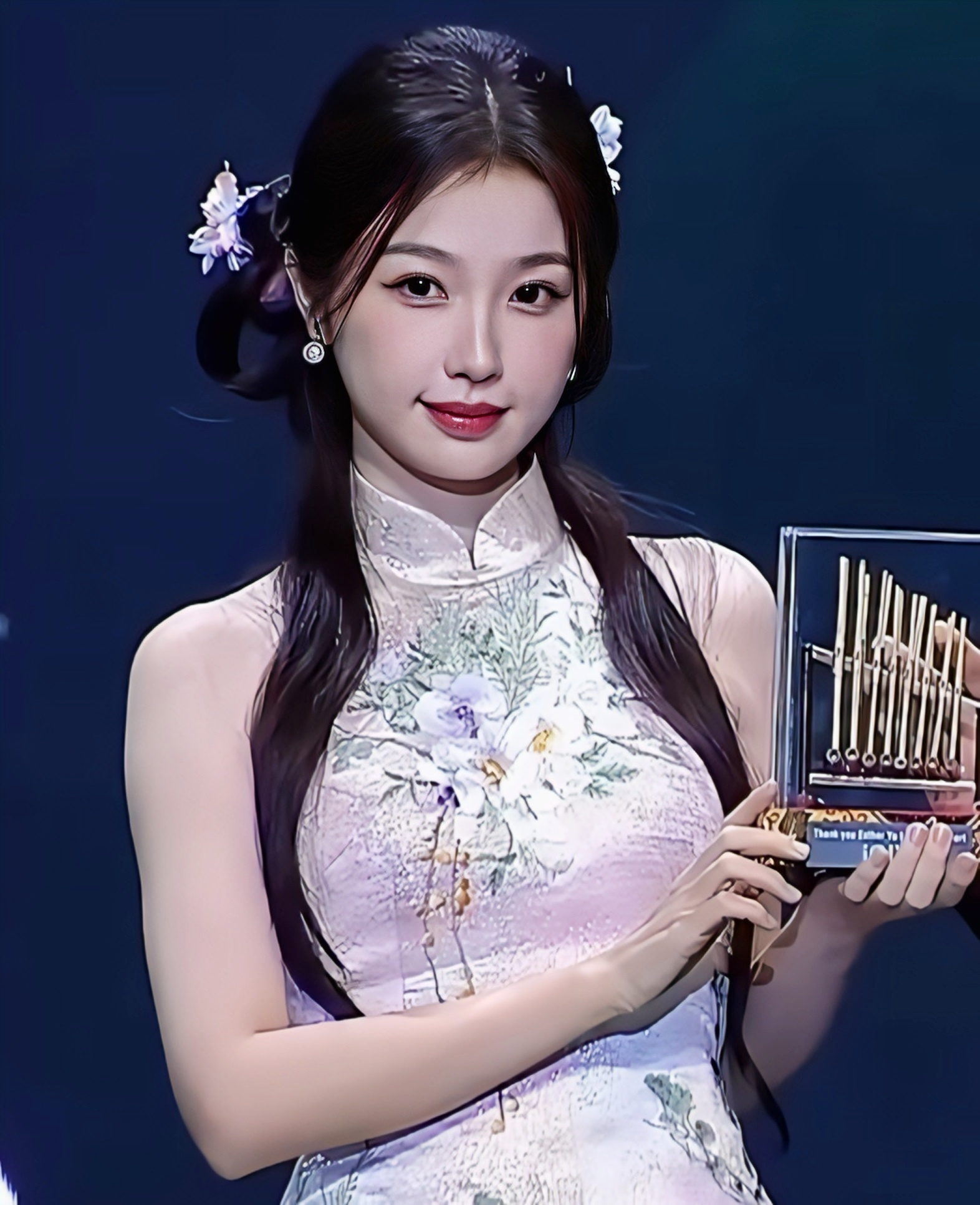
- Yu in 2025
- Born: Yu Shuxin; 18 December 1995 (age 30); Shanghai, China
- Other name: Ma Yu Shu Xin
- Education: Lasalle College of the Arts
- Occupations: Actress; singer
- Years active: 2016–present
- Agent(s): Huace Film & TV
- Musical career
- Genre: C-pop
- Instrument: Vocals
- Years active: 2016–present
- Label: iQIYI (Note: As a member of The9 only)
- Formerly of: The9

Chinese name
- Traditional Chinese: 虞書欣
- Simplified Chinese: 虞书欣
Transcriptions
Standard Mandarin
- Hanyu Pinyin: Yú Shūxīn
Yue: Cantonese
- Jyutping: Jyu4 Syu1jan1

Korean name
- Hangul: 우서흔
Transcriptions
- Revised Romanization: U Seoheun
- McCune–Reischauer: U Sŏhŭn

Yu Shuxin (Chinese: 虞书欣; pinyin: Yú Shūxīn, born December 18, 1995), also known as Esther Yu, is a Chinese actress and singer. She is a former member of The9, the project girl group from iQIYI's survival show Youth With You 2. Yu is known for her roles in the television series Find Yourself (2020), Moonlight (2021), Love Between Fairy and Devil (2022), My Journey to You (2023), Love Game in Eastern Fantasy (2024),"Ski into Love (2025)", Speed and Love (2025) and "Road to Success (2026)" .

== Early life ==
Yu was born in Shanghai, China and is the only child in her family. Her grandfather was chairman of Xinyu Iron and Steel Group and her parents are business moguls who own several real estate, construction and steel companies. Yu herself is also a shareholder and owner of many businesses. For post-secondary education, she attended Lasalle College of the Arts in Singapore and graduated with a degree in Fashion Media and Industries. Yu also attended and was recognized as a key sponsor of the Opening Ceremony for the President's Charity Art Exhibition 2016 which was held on 11 November 2016 in the Fullerton Hotel, by President of the Republic of Singapore, Dr Tony Tan Keng Yam.

== Career ==
=== 2015–2019: Career beginnings ===
In 2015, Yu made her acting debut in the wuxia drama Border Town Prodigal, which premiered in 2016. She then subsequently gained recognition for her appearance in the variety program Grade One Freshman. In 2017, Yu continued to play supporting roles in the historical drama The Advisors Alliance, and romance family drama Ordinary Years.

In 2018, Yu played her first leading role in the coming-of-age drama Youth, adapted from the 2016 South Korean drama Hello, My Twenties. In 2019, she starred as a happy-go-lucky actress in the romantic comedy drama My Amazing Boyfriend 2.

=== 2020–present: Rising popularity ===
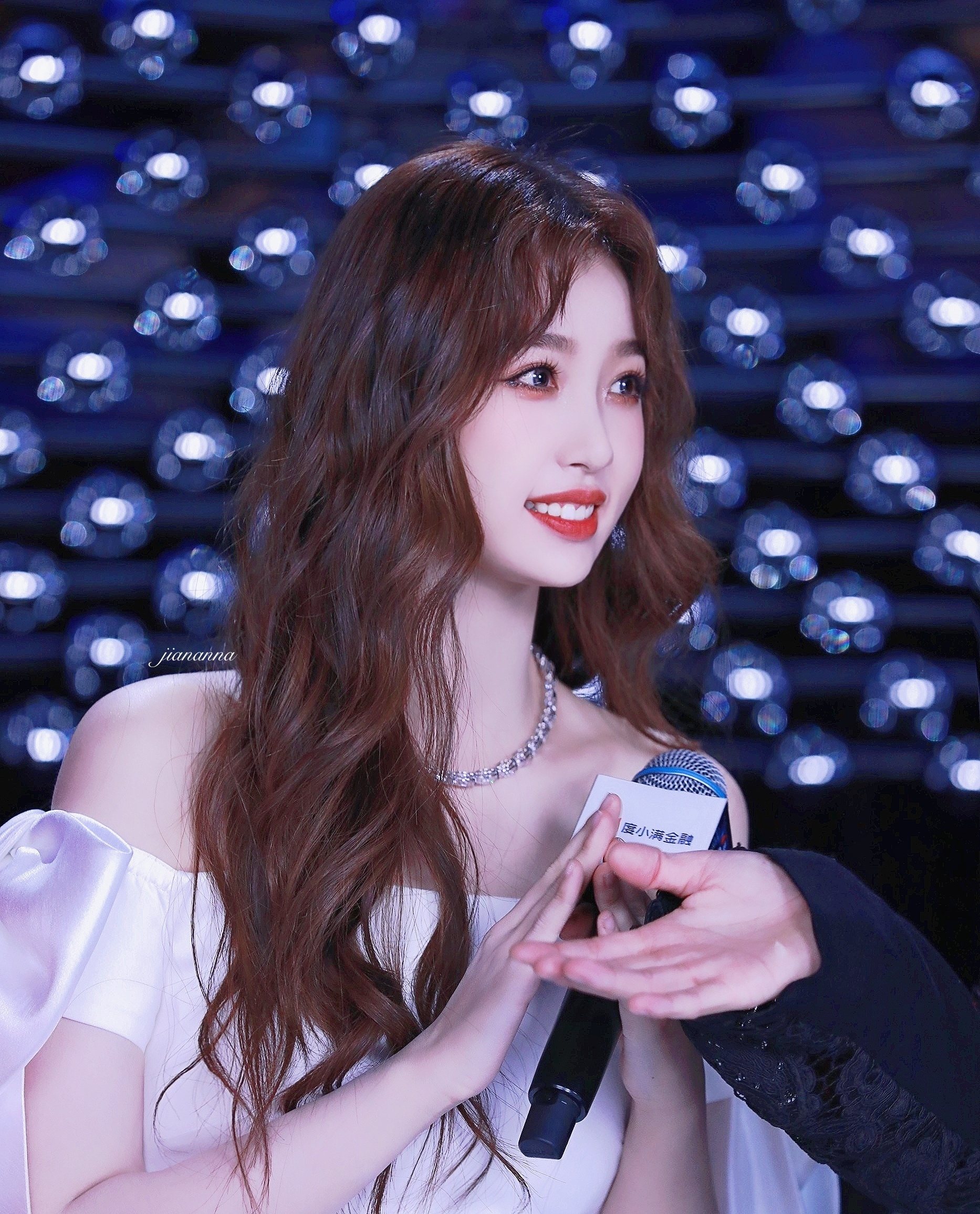
Yu in 2021

In 2020, Yu participated in the variety program Youth With You 2 and became one of the most popular trainees on the show. She successfully debuted as a member of temporary girl group The9 on May 30, 2020.

That same year, Yu gained popularity and recognition with her role as a lovable university student in the hit romance drama Find Yourself, and was nominated for the Audience's Choice award at the 30th China TV Golden Eagle Award. She later portrayed a quirky female investigator in the well-received historical romance I've Fallen For You, and appeared as a recurring guest role in the drama A Love So Romantic. In the 2020 Forbes China Under 30 Elite list, she was included as a notable actress for the Entertainment and Sports industry.

In 2021, Yu starred as a newcomer editor in the romantic comedy drama Moonlight, opposite Ding Yuxi. On December 5, 2021, The9 officially disbanded.

In 2022, Yu starred as a lively and innocent immortal in the widely popular fantasy romance drama Love Between Fairy and Devil, and as a fashion blogger with an Ornithology PhD in the environmental romance drama A Romance of the Little Forest.

In 2023, Yu starred in Sword and Fairy, adapted from the popular Chinese RPG game of the same name, and the historical wuxia drama My Journey to You. She made an appearance in Feng Xiaogang's new film If You Are the One 3. In 2024, she was the female lead for another fantasy historical drama titled Love Game in Eastern Fantasy, reuniting with Ding Yuxi, aired on November 1, 2024.

In 2025, she was the female lead in the romantic sports drama Ski into Love, aired on March 11, 2025. She also was the female lead in the romantic drama Speed and Love, aired on December 12, 2025.

== Filmography ==
=== Film ===
Year	English title	Chinese title	Role	Notes	Ref.
2021	A Writer's Odyssey	刺杀小说家	Nurse	Guest role	
2022	My Little Pony: A New Generation	小马宝莉：新世代	Izzy	Chinese dubbing	
2023	Spider-Man: Across the Spider-Verse	蜘蛛侠：纵横宇宙	Gwen Stacy	Chinese dubbing	
2023	If You Are the One 3	非诚勿扰3	Judy		
TBA	Hua Luo Liu Nian	花落流年	Li Yifan		

=== Television series ===
Year	English title	Chinese title	Role	Network	Notes	Ref.
2016	Border Town Prodigal	新边城浪子	Qing She	Beijing TV	Support role	
2017	The Advisors Alliance	大军师司马懿之军师联盟	Consort Liu	Anhui TV	Support role	
2017	Ordinary Years	平凡岁月	Li Xiaoya	Beijing TV	Support role	
2018	Youth	最亲爱的你	Chen Chenchen	Youku		
2019	My Amazing Boyfriend 2	我的奇妙男友2之恋恋不忘	Tian Jingzhi	Hunan TV, Tencent		
2020	Find Yourself	下一站是幸福	Cai Minmin	Hunan TV, Mango TV		
2020	I've Fallen For You	少主且慢行	Tian Sanqi	iQIYI		
2020	A Love So Romantic	少爷与我的罗曼史	Cheng Qianyu	Tencent	Cameo	
2021	Moonlight	月光变奏曲	Chu Li	iQIYI		
2022	Love Between Fairy and Devil	苍兰诀	Orchid / Xiao Lanhua / Xi Yun	iQIYI		
2022	A Romance of the Little Forest	两个人的小森林	Yu Meiren	Youku		
2023	My Journey to You	云之羽	Yun Weishan	iQIYI		
2024	Sword and Fairy	祈今朝	Yue Qi	Tencent		
2024	Love Game in Eastern Fantasy	永夜星河	Ling Miaomiao / Lin Yu / Mu Qingshi	Tencent		
2025	Ski into Love	嘘，国王在冬眠	Wei Zhi	Youku		
2025	Speed and Love	双轨	Jiang Mu	iQIYI		
2026	Road to Success	灿如繁星	Lin Wanxing	iQIYI		
TBA	Yunchu's Vengeance	云初令	Yunchu	iQIYI		
TBA	Love in the shell	念相思	He Pan	iQIYI		

=== Variety shows ===
Year	English title	Chinese title	Role	Ref.
2016	Grade One Graduation	一年级·毕业季	Cast member	
2019	The Sound: Season 3	声临其境第三季	Member of New Voice Class	
2020	Youth With You 2	青春有你第二季	Contestant	
2020	Let's Party	非日常派对	Cast member	
2020	Dimension Nova	跨次元新星	Expansion mentor	
2021	Youth With You 3	青春有你第三季	Youth tutor	
2022	Let's Go Skiing	超有趣滑雪大会	Cast member	
2024	Chinese Restaurant 8	中餐厅第八季	Cast member	

== Discography ==
Title	Year	Peak chart positions	Album
Title	Year	CHN	Album
"Stars" (星辰)	2016	—	Grade One Freshman OST
"Finally One Day" (终有一天)	2016	—	Grade One Freshman OST
"Love Problem" (恋爱练习题)	2019	—	My Amazing Boyfriend 2 OST
"Ever Since I Met You" (自从遇见你)	2020	—	I've Fallen For You OST
"Gwalla" (乖啦)	2020	—	MatriX
"Here's Chu Li" (初礼来了)	2021	71	Moonlight OST
"Loss of Memory" (失忆)	2022	56	Love Between Fairy and Devil OST
"Wish to be with You" (想和你) (with Dylan Wang)	2022	59	Promotional song for Love Between Fairy and Devil
"All Seems The Same" (好像都一样)	2022	71	A Romance of the Little Forest OST
"Sunny Day After The Rain" (雨过天晴)	2022	—	A Romance of the Little Forest OST
"Oh My"	2023	—	1st mini album Esther
"Unfinished to be Continued" (未完待续)	2023	83	1st mini album Esther
"Bestow Dreams" (赐梦)	2023	61	My Journey to You OST
"Try Everything" (尝试一切) (Special Mandarin Version of "Try Everything" with Ayanga)	2023	—	Promotional song for Shanghai Disney Resort
"Hope" (盼)	2024	—	Sword and Fairy 6 OST
"Pray" (祈)	2024	—	Sword and Fairy 6 OST
"Surge" (澎湃)	2024	22	Love Game in Eastern Fantasy OST
"Moonlight Thoughts" (寄明月) (with Ding Yuxi, Zhu Xudan, Yang Shize, Li Yizhen, Fei Qiming & Lu Yuhao)	2024	7	Promotional song for Love Game in Eastern Fantasy
"Spicy Honey"	2024	9	1st studio album Spicy Honey
"Laffy Taffy"	2024	77	1st studio album Spicy Honey
"How Not To Be"	2024	99	1st studio album Spicy Honey
"Girls Night Out"	2024	—	1st studio album Spicy Honey
"Last One Standing"	2024	—	1st studio album Spicy Honey
"Spicy Honey" (Chinese Ver. featuring Dong Bao Shi)	2024	51	1st studio album Spicy Honey
"Laffy Taffy" (在干嘛呀) ("Laffy Taffy" Chinese Ver.)	2024	76	1st studio album Spicy Honey
"True Love"	2024	98	1st studio album Spicy Honey

== Awards and nominations ==
Year	Award	Category	Nominated work	Result	Ref.
2020	30th China TV Golden Eagle Award	Audience's Choice for Actress	Find Yourself	Nominated	
2020	7th The Actors of China Award Ceremony	Best Actress (Web series)	I've Fallen For You	Nominated	
2020	5th Golden Blossom Internet Film and Television Awards	Actress of the Year	Find Yourself; I've Fallen For You	Nominated	
2020	2020 TV Series Awards	Top 10 Popular Female Characters	Find Yourself	Won	
2022	35th Huading Awards	Best Actress in Chinese Ancient TV Series	Love Between Fairy and Devil	Nominated	
2023	2022 iQIYI Scream Night	Scream Goddess	Love Between Fairy and Devil	Won	
2023	3rd New Era International TV Festival Ammolite Awards	Best Costume Actress in the New Era	Love Between Fairy and Devil	Nominated	
2023	2022 Weibo Awards	Notable Actress of the Year	—N/a	Won	
2023	2023 iQIYI Scream Night	Most Influential Actress of the Year	My Journey to You	Won	
2023	2023 Asian Pop Music Awards	People's Choice Award	"Esther"	Won	
2024	2023 Weibo Awards	Hot Actress of the Year	—N/a	Won	
2024	2024 Weibo TV & Internet Video Summit	Expressive Actress of the Year	—N/a	Won	
2024	2024 iQIYI Scream Night	Asia Pacific All-Round Artist of the Year	—N/a	Won	
2025	2024 Tencent Video All Star Night	Most Overseas Influential Artist of the Year	Love Game in Eastern Fantasy; "Spicy Honey"	Won	
2025	2024 Tencent Video All Star Night	Most Popular TV Actress of the Year	Love Game in Eastern Fantasy	Won	
2025	2024 Tencent Video All Star Night	VIP Star of the Year	Love Game in Eastern Fantasy	Won	
2025	2024 Weibo Awards	Appealing Actress of the Year	—N/a	Won	
