= Love in a Fallen City (web series) =

- Traditional Chinese: 一身孤注擲溫柔
- Simplified Chinese: 一身孤注掷温柔
- Hanyu Pinyin: Yīshēn Gū Zhù Zhì Wēnróu
- Genre: Period; War; Romance
- Directed by: Fu Wei; Zhou Jiankui
- Starring: Ethan Juan; Zhu Xudan; Wang Tianchen
- Country of origin: China
- Original language: Mandarin
- No. of seasons: 1

Production
- Running time: 45 mins
- Production company: Zhejiang Talent Media

Love in a Fallen City (Chinese: 一身孤注擲溫柔; pinyin: Yīshēn Gū Zhù Zhì Wēnróu) is an upcoming Chinese television series based on the novel of the same name by Chun Shanling. It is set to air on Youku. The series stars Ethan Ruan, Zhu Xudan and Wang Tianchen.

== Synopsis ==
This is a story of a general and an ordinary girl, and their perseverance and motivation for each other.

== Cast ==
- Ethan Ruan as Lu Haoting
- Zhu Xudan as Gu Wanyi
- Wang Tianchen as Huo Zhongqi
- Qin Han
- Sun Chun
- Luo Haiqiong
- Dong Yong
- Kingone Wang
- Lin Xinlei
- Wang Guan
- Chen Xingxu
