= Love Between Fairy and Devil =

2022 Chinese television series

- Promotional poster
- Genre: Fantasy; Romance
- Based on: Cang Lan Jue by Jiu Lu Fei Xiang
- Written by: Liu Xiaolin; Bai Jinjin; Zhang Li; Dai Yong
- Directed by: Yi Zheng
- Presented by: Gong Yu; Wang Yixu; Zhang Yucheng
- Starring: Yu Shuxin; Dylan Wang
- Country of origin: China
- Original language: Mandarin
- No. of seasons: 1
- No. of episodes: 36 + 2 Specials

Production
- Executive producers: Yang Bei; Zhang Yucheng
- Producers: Yu Fei; Fu Tuo; Shen Jingjing; Wang Tianlong
- Production location: Hengdian World Studios
- Running time: 45 minutes
- Production companies: iQIYI; Stellar Media

Original release
- Network: iQIYI
- Release: 7 August – 22 September 2022

Related
- Love You Seven Times

Love Between Fairy and Devil (Chinese: 苍兰诀; pinyin: Cāng Lán Jué) is a Chinese television series based on the eponymous novel written by Jiu Lu Fei Xiang. The show is directed by Yi Zheng and Qian Jingwu, starring leads Yu Shuxin and Dylan Wang, and featuring Xu Haiqiao, Guo Xiaoting, and Zhang Linghe in prominent supporting roles. The series aired on iQIYI from August 7, 2022 to September 22, 2022.

The novel has been licensed in English by Seven Seas Entertainment.

== Synopsis ==
Dongfang Qingcang, the Demon Lord known as the Moon Supreme, attacked the realm of the gods with his demon army. The Goddess of War, Chidi Nüzi, sacrificed her life to seal Dongfang Qingcang and his battalion. A prophecy predicts Dongfang Qingcang will be unsealed and only Goddess Xiyun will be able to stop him. Meanwhile, Goddess Xiyun is reborn as Xiao Lanhua, a lowly orchid spirit who unwillingly sets him free. During Dongfang Qingcang's awakening, Xiao Lanhua unknowingly casts the "One Heart Curse" which links their experiences, sharing injuries, emotions, and death. Dongfang Qingcang protects Xiao Lanhua while he searches for a cure, but begins to fall in love with her over the course of their adventures, sacrifices and tribulations in the fairy, demon and human realms.

== Cast ==
=== Main ===
- Yu Shuxin as Orchid / Xiao Lanhua / Goddess Xiyun: an orchid fairy who lives at Arbiter Hall of Shuiyuntian's Siming palace, responsible for looking after her master's Destiny Books. When Orchid was young, her master accidentally spoiled her immortal root with alcohol, resulting in issues with her cultivation.
  - Li Xiyuan portrays young Xiyun.
- Dylan Wang as Dongfang Qingcang: the powerful Moon Supreme, former leader of the Moon Tribe, whose primordial spirit was secretly sealed in Haotian Tower. He is arrogant and unfeeling but begins to change after encountering Xiao Lanhua.
  - Fang Xiaomo portrays teen Dongfang Qingcang and Ren Yifan as young Dongfang Qingcang.

=== Supporting ===
==== Fairy Realm Shuiyuntian ====
- Xu Haiqiao as Rong Hao: apprentice who loves his master, Chidi Nüzi, and the master of the Sea Market. Outwardly, he appears carefree, but he hides a manipulative side.
- Guo Xiaoting as Chidi Nüzi / Xie Wanqing: Rong Hao's teacher and former God of War of Shuiyuntian.
- Zhang Linghe as Changheng / Xiao Run: the current God of War of Shuiyuntian, in love with Xiao Lanhua.
- Wang Yueyi as Danyin / Qu Shui: a highborn fairy in love with Changheng.

==== Moon Tribe's Cangyan Sea ====
- Charles Lin as Shangque: Dongfang Qingcang's faithful and devoted assistant who can switch between human and dragon forms.
- Zhang Chenxiao as Xunfeng: Dongfang Qingcang's younger brother.
- Zhao Bin as Elder Moon Lord: Dongfang Qingcang's father.
- Zhang Bozhi as King of Nanyou.
- Li Xizi as King of Beiyou.

==== Sea Market / Haishi City ====
- Hong Xiao as Jieli: Xiao Lanhua's best friend and a spy from the Sea Market.
- Cheng Zi as Dieyi: loyal assistant of Rong Hao.

=== Special appearances ===
- Li Yitong as Siming: Xiao Lanhua's master who is the Arbiter in charge of safekeeping all destinies. She left Shuiyuntian to travel around the realms and is not returning soon.
- Chen Ruoxuan as Chang Yuan: Siming's husband who she had secretly married.

== Episodes ==
Two episodes aired every Saturday, Sunday, and Monday, with early access to two upcoming episodes offered to VIP members. Two extra episodes were released after the series concluded.

== Original soundtrack ==
No.	Title	Lyrics	Music	Singer	Length
1.	"Loss of Memory (失忆)"	Chen Tian, Wang Yixu	Chen Shuai	Yu Shuxin	3:31
2.	"Looking For You (寻一个你)" (Theme song)	Zhan Yijun; 阿曼达 Amanda	Hu Chen; 阿曼达 Amanda	Liu Yuning	4:27
3.	"The Oath of Canglan (苍兰契)"	Chen Tian	Chen Tian	Li Changchao	3:32
4.	"Remaining Love (余情)" (Ending song)	EDIQ	Ikurō Fujiwara	Zhou Shen	5:14
5.	"Parting Love (诀爱)" (Opening song)	Jiang Nan; Chen Tian	Jiang Nan; Chen Tian	Faye Chan	3:09
6.	"The Other Shore (彼岸)"	Shen Min Wei; Chen Tian	Chen Tian	Jing Long & Jing Di	2:55
7.	"Longing (念)"	Deng Shu Yue; 阿曼达 Amanda	Deng Shu Yue; 阿曼达 Amanda	Shuang Sheng	2:47
8.	"I Still Remember That Day (我还记得那天)"	Lin Qiao	Du Zhiwen	Shen Yichang	3:42

== Broadcast time ==
Unless otherwise specified, all times in this entry are in UTC+8.

Channel	Location	Broadcast date	Broadcast time	Remarks
iQIYI	China	August 7, 2022 - August 29, 2022	20:00	Member The first update is 6 episodes, and the first week of updates is 10 days in a row. From August 21, it will be changed to update 2 episodes every Saturday to Monday. For non-members, 1 episode is updated every Saturday to Wednesday, with 2 episodes being updated for the first time.
IQIYI International Version; WeTV	Overseas	August 7, 2022 - August 29, 2022	20:00	Member The first update is 6 episodes, and the first week of updates is 10 days in a row. From August 21, it will be changed to update 2 episodes every Saturday to Monday. For non-members, 1 episode is updated every Saturday to Wednesday, with 2 episodes being updated for the first time.
NETFLIX	Overseas	September 9, 2022		
myTV SUPER	Hong Kong	September 2, 2022		
CHANNEL CHINA（Korean：채널차이나）	South Korea	September 20, 2022		
J2	Hong Kong	December 9, 2022	19:30	1 episode broadcast from Monday to Friday
WOWOWO	Japan	April 7, 2023		
Video Theater	Taiwan	July 12, 2023	22:00 - 00:00	Monday to Friday
CTV8	Cambodia	August 25, 2023	12:00, 21:00	Monday to Friday
Elda Comprehensive Channel	Taiwan	September 11, 2023	19:00 - 21:00	Monday to Friday, two episodes in a row
MediaCorp Channel 8	Singapore	October 10, 2023	23:00 - 00:00	1 episode will be broadcast from Monday to Friday, and can also be viewed on-demand on the TV station website Watch.
Lala TV	Japan	April 3, 2024		
BS12	Japan	July 12, 2024		
GMA	Philippines	September 8, 2025 - January 9, 2026	8:25, - 9:00	Monday to Friday

== Production ==
Love Between Fairy and Devil is an adaption of the eponymous novel by Jiu Lu Fei Xiang. Writers spent over 800 days developing the script. The show's preparatory period lasted over 400 days. More than 600 cast and crew members helped create over 5,000 pieces of clothing, 3,000 accessories, and 20,000 art props. The props integrate Chinese intangible cultural heritage with the xianxia genre. Five major Chinese intangible cultural heritage art were incorporated into the series, with 32 intangible cultural heritage crafts guided by 27 craftspeople, which is reflected in all aspects of Fuhua Dao. The producer, Wang Yixu, said that the show's theme is "love and peace". The cast was confirmed on December 18, 2020. Filming commenced on February 14, 2021 and finished on June 11, 2021.
