= The Romance of Tiger and Rose =

Chinese web television series

- Promotional poster
- Also known as: The Rumored Chen Qianqian; 传闻中的陈芊芊

Chinese name
- Traditional Chinese: 傳聞中的陳芊芊
- Simplified Chinese: 传闻中的陈芊芊
Transcriptions
Standard Mandarin
- Hanyu Pinyin: Chuánwén Zhōng De Chén Qiānqiān
- Genre: Romantic drama Comedy film Historical drama
- Created by: Nan Zhen
- Written by: Nan Zhen
- Directed by: Cha Chuanyi
- Starring: Zhao Lusi; Ding Yu Xi
- Opening theme: "Moon Night" by Shuang Sheng & Yao Yang
- Ending theme: "Rumor" by Huo Zun
- Country of origin: China
- Original language: Mandarin
- No. of seasons: 1
- No. of episodes: 24

Production
- Executive producers: Qi Shuai; Qian Rui
- Producers: Fei Wo Si Cun; Sun Jing; Cheng Li
- Production locations: Mainland China; Hengdian Studios
- Running time: 45 minutes
- Production companies: Tencent Penguin Pictures; Orange Pictures

Original release
- Network: Tencent
- Release: May 18 – June 1, 2020

The Romance of Tiger and Rose (Chinese: 传闻中的陈芊芊; pinyin: Chuánwén Zhōng De Chén Qiānqiān) is a 2020 Chinese streaming television series starring Zhao Lusi and Ding Yuxi, and tells the story of a young screenwriter who must survive after being trapped in her own script, with her character meant to die early in the story. The series airs on Tencent Video starting May 18, 2020.

The series became a hit on social media, with its hashtag garnering over 3 billion hits on Weibo. By June 2, the series received over 897 million views on Tencent Video.

== Synopsis ==
Despite facing criticism from fellow staff, Chen Xiaoqian (Zhao Lusi) exerts all her energy writing her drama screenplay. After falling into a well-earned nap, she finds herself transported into her own screenplay. She becomes the hated third princess, Chen Qianqian, who is scheduled to be killed by the male lead Han Shuo (Ding Yuxi) by episode three. Armed with knowledge of her own story, Chen Xiaoqian must struggle to keep herself alive as well as advance the plot forward by bringing her two lead characters together.

== Cast ==
Main cast

- Zhao Lusi as Chen Xiaoqian, a screenwriter / Chen Qianqian, infamous Third Princess of Huayuan city.
  - Dang Yixin as young Qianqian
- Ding Yuxi as Han Shuo, Prince of Xuanhu City
- Sheng Yinghao as Pei Heng, Minister of Education, Qianqian's fiance.
- Zhou Zixin as Chen Chuchu, Second Princess of Huayuan City.
  - Shentu Hanqian as young Chuchu

Supporting Cast

- Quan Peilun as Su Mu, top musician and courtesan.
- Xiao Wei as Lin Qi, young mistress of the Lin family, managing the Royal Academy.
- Chen Minghao as Su Ziying, Pei Heng's subordinate.
- Zhao Xin as Chen Yuanyuan, Eldest Princess of Huayuan City
- Hu Caihong as Chief of Huayuan City
- Wu Yijia as Zi Rui, Chen Qianqian's servant
- Liu Shuyuan as Baiji, Han Shuo's servant
- Pan Luyu as Zi Nian
- Li Ang as Sang Qi
- Zhang Bofan as Zi Zhu
- Han Zhigang as Housekeeper of Lin Manor
- Jin Yanqing as Pei Heng's subordinate
- Liu Xin as Storyteller
- Xue Yilun as Storyteller
- Wang Ming as Storyteller
- Guo Jiayi as Minister Hang, spy of Xuanhu city
- Zhang Haocheng as Chief of Xuanhu city, Han Shuo's father.
- Zhang Tingting as Madame of Xuanhu city, Han Shuo's mother.
- Ge Hao as Xuanhu envoy
- Shen Chi as Meng Guo
- Ji Shan as Minister Liu
- Zhang Haoge as Zhang Yide
- Zhang Minghe as Minister Han
- Ning Xianzhou as Agent
- Fu Qiang as General Li
- Fu Jingying as Miss Li
- Qiu Xiao as Miss Wang
- Shi Yan as Ceremonial Official
- Deng Ziyu as Examiner
- Zheng Yunjie as Judge

== Production and release ==
The show was filmed between August and October 2019 at Hengdian World Studios. The first poster and trailer was released on April 29, 2020, and was announced on May 11 of its exclusive broadcast on Tencent Video.

== Soundtrack ==
The Romance of Tiger and Rose Original Soundtrack (OST)

Soundtrack album by Various artists
- Released: June 1, 2020
- Genre: Mandopop; Instrumental
- Language: Mandarin
- Label: New Law Culture (新律文化)
- Producer: Hong Chuan

The Romance of Tiger and Rose OST's producer is Hong Chuan, who also worked on The Sleuth of the Ming Dynasty (2020) and Wait in Beijing (2020) original soundtracks.

传闻中的陈芊芊 - 网剧原声大碟 DISC 1
No.	Title	Lyrics	Music	Singer	Length
1.	"Rumor (传闻)" (Ending theme song)	Cui Shu	Hong Chuan	Huo Zun	2:22
2.	"Moon Night (月夜)" (Opening theme song)	Zheng Lingxu	Chen Xinhua	Shuang Sheng, Yao Yang	3:50
3.	"Partnership (结伴)"	Cui Shu	Wang Ke	Cui Zige, Duo Liang	4:25
4.	"Feelings of the Wind (风清)"	Zhao Lingyi	Zhao Jialin	Xu Liang	4:33
5.	"Time (时光话)"	JBS Music	JBS Music	Zhao Lusi	3:18
6.	"Rumor (传闻) (inst.)"		Hong Chuan		3:27
7.	"Moon Night (月夜) (inst.)"		Chen Xinhua		3:50
8.	"Partnership (结伴) (inst.)"		Wang Ke		4:25
9.	"Feelings of the Wind (风清) (inst.)"		Zhao Jianlin		4:35
10.	"Time (时光话) (inst.)"		JBS Music		4:52

传闻中的陈芊芊 - 网剧原声大碟 DISC 2

No.	Title	Music	Length
1.	"Domineering (霸气)"	Hong Chuan	0:40
2.	"Playful (俏皮)"	Hong Chuan	1:15
3.	"Imposing (气势如虹)"	Hong Chuan	1:26
4.	"Mountains and Water (山高水阔)"	Hong Chuan	1:27
5.	"Stretch (绵延)"	Hong Chuan	1:31
6.	"Farewell (惜别)"	Hong Chuan	2:22
7.	"Think Carefully (小心思)"	Hong Chuan	1:44
8.	"Beauty in Picture (美人如画)"	Hong Chuan	1:47
9.	"Goodbye as Always (再见如初)"	Hong Chuan	1:50
10.	"Do not regret (执迷不悔)"	Hong Chuan	2:28

== Reception ==
The Romance of Tiger and Rose has currently earned a 7.5 on Douban with more than 162,000 user reviews. It has been praised for its interesting setup and plot, although the gender swap dynamics presented in its matriarchal setting have been criticized for being inconsistent in its portrayal.
