= Moonlight (Chinese TV series) =

Chinese romantic comedy

- Genre: Romantic comedy
- Based on: Here's Chu Li by Qing Mei
- Written by: Qiu Ting; Zhu Qi
- Directed by: Zhang Boyu
- Starring: Yu Shuxin; Ding Yuxi
- Ending theme: Here's Chu Li by Yu Shuxin
- Country of origin: China
- Original language: Mandarin
- No. of episodes: 36

Production
- Executive producers: Yang Bei; Su Jiangyu
- Producers: Cao Yixiu; Zhang Shuangshuang; Huang Qianni; Wang Xiaoyan
- Running time: 45 mins
- Production companies: iQIYI; Croton Media; Haoju Pictures

Original release
- Network: iQIYI
- Release: May 20, 2021

Moonlight (Chinese: 月光变奏曲) is a 2021 Chinese romantic comedy television series starring Yu Shuxin, Ding Yuxi, Yang Shize, and Ma Yinyin. Adapted from Qing Mei's novel Here's Chu Li (初礼来了), it revolves around the career and romance between an editor and an author, as well as the challenges in the publishing industry. The series aired exclusively on iQIYI at 20:00 (CST) starting from May 20, 2021.

It is the first drama part of Sweet On Theater (恋恋剧场), an iQIYI original lineup of romantic television series.

== Synopsis ==
After graduating from university, with a passion for publishing, Chu Li (Yu Shuxin) successfully entered her dream company Yuan Yue Books. However, a challenging path lies ahead of her and she is shocked to find out that the publishing industry has undergone huge changes. Famous author Zhou Chuan (Ding Yuxi) is said to be gentle as jade when he’s really not; turns out to be her online friend and the two are immediately at odds due to their different perspectives. With her sincerity, professionalism as well as unique vision, Chu Li earns the respect of renowned authors and helped authors who are at their bottleneck stage find new inspiration. She eventually discovers that Zhou Chuan is her close online friend whom she shared all her secret, and they gradually overcome obstacles together, advancing both romantically and professionally helping each other to shine brighter.

== Cast ==
=== Main ===
- Yu Shuxin as Chu Li
  - A passionate newcomer editor who sticks to her original aspirations, wholeheartedly dedicating to helping authors refine their works and publish high-quality books.
- Ding Yuxi as Zhou Chuan
  - A famous author who is said to be gentle as jade, but only people in the publishing industry know of his true image.
- Yang Shize as Jiang Yucheng
  - An author who is suffering from writer's block, and he is Zhou Chuan's close friend.
- Ma Yinyin as Gu Baizhi
  - An established content planning director from Xin Yun Books.

=== Supporting ===
==== Yuan Yue Books ====
- Wang Ting as Yu Yao
- Paul Chun as Chief Editor Xia
- Zhu Yongteng as Liang Chonglang
- Zhou Pu as Lao Miao
- He Xinlin as Suo Heng
- Hua Tong as A Xiang
- Jing Ruyang as Du Niaoniao
- Yang Tingting as Li Xianyu
- Qu Gang as President Yang

==== Chu Li and Zhou Chuan's family ====
- He Yunqing as Zhou Guxuan (Zhou Chuan's Father)
- Zhou Ling as Zhou Chuan's Mother
- Tian Miao as Chu Li's Mother
- Li Hongquan as Chu Li's Father

==== Others ====
- Ye Xiaowei as Fei Yun
- Xiong Yuting as Song Xi
- Wang Hongyi as Xiao Bai
- Sun Gelu as Jian Niangniang (Cocoon Empress)
- Li Yize as Luo Wen
- Dong Kefei as Hema (Hippo)
- Jiang Yuwei as Nana
- Wang Zijun as Li Wei

== Soundtrack ==
No.	Title	Lyrics	Music	Singer	Length
1.	"Here's Chu Li (初礼来了)" (Theme song)	Duan Si Si	Tan Xuan	Yu Shuxin	4:25
2.	"Niu Niu"	Liu Chang	Zeng Di	Shuang Sheng	3:32
3.	"Heartless Poem (无心之诗)" (Zhou Chuan's song)	Duan Sisi	Tan Xuan	Ding Yuxi	4:02
4.	"Faded (晕海)"	Duan Si Si	Tan Xuan	Zhang Yuan	4:06
5.	"Paper Airplane (纸飞机)"	Liu Chang	Tan Xuan	Jin Wenqi	4:45
6.	"Polar Day (极昼)"	Liu Chang	Tan Xuan	Ma Sihui	3:54

== Production ==
It began filming on September 26, 2020 in Suzhou, China. They held their boot camp ceremony on October 10, 2020, and wrapped up on January 6, 2021.

== Reception ==
Moonlight received positive reviews and earned a 7.0 score on Douban. It has been praised for its skillful adaptation of the original novel, reasonable characters, and the acting performance of the cast. During its run, the series and actors also topped several media rankings such as the Guduo TV series list, Maoyan TV series list, Yunhe Data series popularity list, Weibo TV series list, etc.
