= Love Game in Eastern Fantasy =

2024 Chinese television series

- Promotional poster
- Genre: Xianxia; Romance
- Based on: The Guide to Capturing a Black Lotus by Bai Yu Zhai Diao Gong
- Written by: Bai Jinjin; Xi Ruyuan
- Directed by: Zhao Yilong
- Starring: Yu Shuxin; Ding Yuxi; Zhu Xudan; Yang Shize
- Opening theme: "Before the Eternal Night" by Curley G
- Country of origin: China
- Original language: Mandarin
- No. of episodes: 32

Production
- Executive producer: Wang Juan
- Producers: Li Eryun; Wang Yixu; Zhang Yucheng
- Production location: Hengdian World Studios
- Running time: 45 minutes
- Production companies: Tencent Penguin Pictures; Stellar Media

Original release
- Network: Tencent Video
- Release: 1 November – 17 November 2024

Love Game in Eastern Fantasy (Chinese: 永夜星河; pinyin: Yǒngyè Xīnghé) is a 2024 Chinese television series based on the web novel The Guide to Capturing a Black Lotus by Bai Yu Zhai Diao Gong. It stars Yu Shuxin, Ding Yuxi, Zhu Xudan, and Yang Shize in leading roles. The series premiered on Tencent Video and WeTV on November 1, 2024.

On November 9, 2024, the popularity exceeded 30,000 heat index on Tencent.

The drama was exclusively broadcast on Tencent Video on November 1, 2024. On May 31 of the same year, the drama won the 2024 Golden Bone Flower Network Film and Television Festival's "2024 Most Anticipated Drama" award.

Since the premiere of Love Game in Eastern Fantasy on November 1, the total number of streaming viewership has soared from 150 million to nearly 280 million in mid-November. The follow-up game "Love Game in Eastern Fantasy", which was released after the television series, had a market share of over 20%.

== Synopsis ==
In the heat of a moment, Ling Miaomiao (Yu Shuxin) writes a scathing book review of the web novel Catching Demons and accidentally triggers a multidimensional trip which causes her to travel into the world of the novel. She enters the body of the villainous supporting character Lin Yu. In order to return to the real world, she must complete both of the main missions and sub missions assigned by the system. There, she meets Mu Sheng (Ding Yuxi), the second male protagonist, who in the novel was obsessed with Mu Yao and was also responsible for driving Lin Yu to her death. As Miaomiao becomes entangled with him, the hidden past and the truth behind the novel's world gradually unfold.

== Cast and characters ==
=== Main ===
==== Yu Shuxin as Ling Miaomiao / Lin Yu / Mu Qingshi ====
- Ling Miaomiao: An ordinary young woman from the modern world and an avid reader of the fantasy novel Catching Demons, written by Fu Zhou. After being transported into the novel, she assumes the identity of Lin Yu, a minor antagonist and the daughter of a local magistrate. Bound to a mysterious task system, Miaomiao must complete a series of missions, including changing the fate of the novel's characters, in order to return to her original world. Although initially unfamiliar with the dangers of the demon-catching world, her resourcefulness, optimism and willingness to challenge the original storyline gradually influence those around her. Her relationship with Mu Sheng becomes central to her journey.
- Lin Yu: The original character whose identity Miaomiao assumes after entering Catching Demons. She is the daughter of the local magistrate and occupies the role of a supporting antagonist in the original novel. Miaomiao's arrival changes the character's predetermined actions and relationships, setting the story on a different course.
- Mu Qingshi: A legendary figure from the history of the Mu family, regarded as its first head and the first heavenly-level demon catcher. She lived approximately 900 years before the main events of the story and was revered as a protector of the mortal world. Mu Qingshi possessed a rare seven-coloured inner core and the powerful heavenly revelation ability, which enabled her to alter the course of events. Her magical weapon, the Crescent Moon (上弦月), is closely connected to Mu Sheng and his extraordinary heritage.

==== Ding Yuxi as Mu Sheng / Mu Ziqi / Fu Zhou ====
- Mu Sheng: A half-human, half-demon who was adopted into the demon-catching Mu family as a child. Known by his courtesy name, Ziqi, he is the younger brother of Mu Yao and initially appears reserved, obedient and devoted to his sister. Beneath this composed exterior, however, he is guarded, calculating and capable of considerable ruthlessness. His mixed heritage leaves him caught between the human world in which he was raised and his demonic origins, forcing him to conceal his true nature. Although his attachment to Mu Yao initially shapes much of his behaviour, his growing relationship with Ling Miaomiao challenges his distrust of others and gradually changes his understanding of affection, loyalty and love
- Fu Zhou: The author of Catching Demons and the creator of the fictional world in which the main story unfolds. His real name is Xia Ziqi. Having experienced an unhappy childhood and living with Moyamoya disease, Fu Zhou grows up feeling isolated and doubtful that people can genuinely understand or love one another. He writes Catching Demons during a period of deep unhappiness, creating a world shaped by his own fears, frustrations and disillusionment. His connection with Ling Miaomiao becomes significant to the relationship between the fictional world and reality, as well as to the story's exploration of loneliness, imagination and human connection.

==== Zhu Xudan as Mu Yao ====
- Mu Yao: The nineteenth head of the Mu family and the original female protagonist of Catching Demons. A highly skilled demon catcher, she assumes responsibility for her family after the Mu household is destroyed by the powerful demon known as the Resentful Woman. Having survived the massacre with her younger brother Mu Sheng, she dedicates herself to restoring the family's legacy, seeking revenge and eliminating the demon responsible. Principled, disciplined and fiercely protective of those she loves, Mu Yao initially views demons with deep suspicion. Her experiences gradually challenge her understanding of the distinction between humans and demons. She develops a close friendship with Ling Miaomiao, whom she comes to regard as a younger sister, while her partnership with fellow demon catcher Liu Fuyi develops into a romantic relationship. Her determination to uncover the truth behind her family's destruction remains a driving force throughout the story.

==== Yang Shize as Liu Fuyi ====
- Liu Fuyi: The original male protagonist of Catching Demons and a respected demon catcher trained by the cultivator Lu Huaian. Originally from Cainan County, he experienced a difficult childhood after his parents, who were bandits, were arrested and executed. He was subsequently taken in by villagers and raised among ordinary people before being rescued and trained by Lu Huaian. Although gentle, courteous and guided by a strong sense of justice, Liu Fuyi is also a capable fighter and an accomplished demon hunter. He initially approaches Mu Yao under instructions from his master to obtain the Map of Hundred Demons in Mountains and Seas, a powerful family heirloom that reveals the whereabouts of demons. However, his growing affection for Mu Yao complicates his original mission, and he ultimately becomes her trusted companion in the fight against supernatural threats.

=== Supporting ===
==== The Modern World ====
- Song Jialun as Ling Chang'an: Ling Miaomiao's father in the real world. He died in a tragic accident, and his appearance is identical to that of Lin Lushan in the fictional world. His resemblance to Lin Lushan creates an emotional connection between Miaomiao's real life and her new existence inside Catching Demons.
- Peng Bo as CEO Tao: Ling Miaomiao's employer in the modern world. His unreasonable demands and treatment of Miaomiao contribute to her frustration with her everyday working life before she enters the fictional world.

==== Taicang County ====
- Zheng Yan as The System (voiced by Zheng Yan): The System is a mysterious, disembodied presence that guides and monitors Ling Miaomiao after she enters the world of Catching Demons. It communicates through a voice that only she can hear, issuing missions, setting objectives and tracking her progress. Operating according to strict rules and conditions, it determines whether tasks have been completed successfully and imposes punishments when they are not. Although it functions much like a game interface, the System has a significant influence over Miaomiao's actions and her attempts to return to the real world.
- Song Jialun as Lin Lushan: County magistrate of Taicang and Lin Yu's father in the fictional novel. Initially regarded as a corrupt official, he is responsible for maintaining order in the county and seeks the Mu family's assistance when a series of demon attacks threaten the local population. His resemblance to Ling Miaomiao's deceased father has a profound emotional effect on her.
- Song Zhaoyi as Wan (Xiao Wan): Lin Yu's maidservant at the magistrate's residence. She assists Miaomiao after she assumes Lin Yu's identity and helps her navigate the household and the expectations placed upon the magistrate's daughter.
- Chen Xinwei as Hua Yi: Another maidservant in Lin Yu's household. She serves the magistrate's daughter and is part of the household staff at the beginning of Miaomiao's life in the fictional world.
- Chen Duling as the Mirror Demon (guest appearance): A supernatural creature encountered during the demon-catching investigation in Taicang. It possesses the ability to create deceptive reflections and trap people within an illusory world, making it difficult for its victims to distinguish reality from illusion.

==== The Bamboo Forest ====
- Lu Yuhao as Cui Cui: A timid and gentle bamboo shoot spirit who lives in a bamboo forest with his grandfather, an old bamboo demon. Despite being a demon, Cui Cui has never harmed humans and is frightened of strangers. Following his grandfather's disappearance, he is left alone to protect their home. To discourage people from entering the forest, he creates the illusion of a terrifying, man-eating demon and spreads frightening stories about the creature. He eventually befriends Ling Miaomiao and becomes a companion to the demon-catching group.

==== The Imperial Capital ====
- Wen Zhengrong as Empress Dowager Zhao (Zhao Qinru): A powerful member of the imperial court and the Emperor's mother. She is the elder sister of Zhao Qinghuan and the mother of Princess Duan Yang. Her involvement in the destruction of Qilin Mountain and the events surrounding the Mu family forms an important part of the story's historical conflict.
- Li Yizhen as Princess Duan Yang (Li Songmin): The Emperor's younger sister and daughter of Zhao Qinru. She is engaged to Zhao Ruoshi, the young Marquis Qing Yi. However, after Liu Fuyi rescues her from a demon attack, she develops romantic feelings for him, complicating her arranged marriage.
- Fei Qiming as Zhao Ruoshi: The current Marquis Qing Yi and head of the Imperial Bureau of Astronomy. He is the son of Zhao Qinghuan and nephew of Zhao Qinru. Engaged to Princess Duan Yang, he becomes romantically interested in Ling Miaomiao after meeting her at the imperial palace. His family history also connects him to Mu Sheng and the events surrounding Qilin Mountain.
- Xu Haiqiao as Zhao Qinghuan / Marquis Qing Yi: The former Marquis Qing Yi and younger brother of Zhao Qinru. He is the father of Zhao Ruoshi and Mu Sheng, although his connection to Mu Sheng is initially concealed. His relationship with Mu Rong'er and the circumstances surrounding their separation are closely connected to the history of Qilin Mountain.
- Lai Yi as Tao Ying: A cultivator who serves as an aide to the Incubus Demon. He is connected to the supernatural events and historical tragedy involving Zhao Qinru and the imperial court. His past actions and influence continue to haunt members of the imperial family.

==== Liaoran Valley ====
- Zhang Chenguang as Lu Huai'an: A respected cultivator known as Master Wenxin and the mentor of Liu Fuyi. He lives in Liaoran Valley, where he continues his cultivation and preserves important knowledge about demon hunting. He has a longstanding connection to the Mu family and entrusted Mu Huaijiang with the family's powerful Map of Hundred Demons in Mountains and Seas. His past decisions become important to the revelations surrounding the Mu family and Mu Sheng's heritage.

==== Liuru Village ====
- Hai Lu as Shi Niangzi: A mysterious woman living in Liuru Village who is known locally as a divine doctor. She is actually a fox demon who uses her healing abilities to help the villagers. She lives with her husband, Li Zhun, and their daughter, Chu Chu. Her family's tragic history and her desperate attempts to bring her daughter back to life lead her to make a dangerous bargain with a phantom demon.
- Yu Menglong as Li Zhun: Shi Niangzi's human husband and the father of Chu Chu. He lives quietly in Liuru Village and is devoted to his family. Despite knowing the truth about his wife's supernatural nature and the circumstances surrounding their daughter's return, he remains by her side.
- Liu Jiaxi as Chu Chu: The daughter of Shi Niangzi and Li Zhun, who died as a young child. Through her mother's desperate efforts to restore her, she returns as a phantom demon. She has a special connection to Liu Fuyi, who rescued her when she was younger, and uses supernatural illusions and magical threads to manipulate his memories and actions.

==== Wufang Town / Qilin Mountain ====
- Gillian Chung as Mu Rong'er / Goddess Mei / Resentful Woman: A powerful nine-tailed fox demon and Mu Sheng's mother. Originally known as Goddess Mei, she was a figure of extraordinary supernatural power. Her relationship with Zhao Qinghuan and her connection to the Mu family eventually led to her losing her heart and becoming the Resentful Woman, the Queen of Demons. Her tragic history is closely tied to the destruction of Qilin Mountain and the events that shaped Mu Sheng's childhood.
- Wang Xiaochen as Liu Niang: A powerful flying demon and the younger sister of Mu Rong'er. She is associated with Wufang Town, where she operates Wuyou Water Fort. She holds deep resentment towards Mu Sheng because of the suffering and sacrifice surrounding his birth. Her actions are driven by her attachment to her sister and her desire to restore what was lost.
- Rao Jiadi as Tao Zi: A woman associated with Liu Niang's Wuyou Water Fort in Wufang Town. She is one of the inhabitants of the supernatural establishment and appears during the group's investigation into the town and its mysterious connections to Qilin Mountain.
- Bao Jianfeng as Mu Huaijiang: The former head of the Mu family and father of Mu Yao. A powerful demon catcher, he was once a close friend of Lu Huai'an. His ambition to attain the heavenly level of demon-catching power led him to exploit the power of Mu Rong'er, whose heart was believed to hold the secret to reaching that level. He participated in the destruction of Qilin Mountain alongside members of the imperial court, resulting in the massacre of its demon inhabitants and Mu Rong'er's transformation into the Resentful Woman. He later imprisoned her in the dungeon beneath the Mu family residence, concealing her identity and the truth of his actions from his family.

== Key Locations and Realms ==
=== The Modern World ===
The modern world is the contemporary setting in which Ling Miaomiao lives before entering the fictional world of Catching Demons. It is depicted as an ordinary, present-day society, with office workplaces, modern technology and everyday urban life. Miaomiao works in an office and finds herself increasingly dissatisfied with her job and her employer. Her life in this world provides a contrast to the historical fantasy setting she later enters. Although the two worlds appear separate, similarities between people in them become an important part of the story.

=== Taicang County ===
Taicang County is the first major setting in the fictional world. It is a traditional county town governed by a magistrate, with a central administrative residence, streets, shops and surrounding rural settlements. Beneath its ordinary appearance, the county is affected by the presence of demons and supernatural disturbances. Its inhabitants live in a world where demon hunting is an established practice, and local authorities rely on experienced demon catchers when unusual threats arise. The magistrate's residence is one of the principal locations within the county, providing a glimpse of the hierarchy and daily life of its governing household.

=== The Bamboo Forest ===
The Bamboo Forest is a dense, secluded woodland inhabited by bamboo spirits and other supernatural creatures. Its towering bamboo stalks and thick vegetation create an enclosed environment in which it is easy for travellers to become disoriented or lose their way. The forest is regarded by local people as dangerous territory, with frightening stories circulating about a monstrous creature said to live among the trees. Its reputation makes it a place that ordinary travellers are reluctant to enter. Beneath these stories, however, the forest is also a home for nature spirits, whose existence is closely connected to the surrounding bamboo.

=== The Imperial Capital ===
The Imperial Capital is the political and administrative centre of the human realm. It is home to the imperial palace, the royal household and the institutions responsible for maintaining the authority of the court. Unlike the smaller settlements encountered earlier, the capital is a place of considerable wealth and influence, where political alliances, family connections and court intrigue shape events. It is also an important centre for the practice of demon hunting. The Imperial Bureau of Astronomy occupies a significant position in the city, studying celestial phenomena and supernatural disturbances. Its work reflects the close relationship between the human government and the wider magical world.

=== Liaoran Valley ===
Liaoran Valley is a secluded mountain valley concealed from the outside world by a powerful magical formation. Its entrance is protected by the Mirror Formation, which reflects the inner nature of those who pass through it. Rather than showing a person's outward appearance, the formation reveals a symbolic image of their true self on a stone wall. This makes the entrance more than a physical barrier: it is also a means of exposing identities and hidden aspects of a person's nature.

The valley is home to Master Wenxin and a community in which humans and demons live together. Its secluded setting offers an alternative to the hostility that often exists between the two groups elsewhere. The surrounding bamboo forest is also home to supernatural inhabitants, including the old bamboo demon Qingqing. Liaoran Valley is therefore both a place of refuge and a repository of knowledge about demons, cultivation and the history of the human and demon worlds.

=== Liuru Village ===
Liuru Village is a small rural settlement in Cainan County, surrounded by mountains and countryside. It appears to be an ordinary farming community, with traditional homes and villagers who share a close-knit way of life. Its welcoming atmosphere conceals a history of supernatural events, however, and the village is closely associated with the mysterious survival of people who were believed to have died years earlier.

The surrounding region contains rare supernatural creatures, including the Icy Jade Silkworm, which lives on the petals of the Silk Soul Flower. The silkworm is extremely delicate and cannot survive for long outside its natural habitat, making it difficult to obtain and preserve. The village's connection to these creatures and to attempts to restore life gives the seemingly peaceful settlement a darker and more mysterious character.

=== Wufang Town ===
Wufang Town is a settlement in Xilai County known for its theatrical performances and storytelling. In recent years, it has attracted visitors drawn by the stories performed by Lord Jiyue, whose tales are based on memories preserved in mysterious pearls. These objects contain fragments of the past, allowing events and experiences from earlier times to be recalled through the stories told in the town.

Beyond its public streets and performance venues, Wufang Town has connections to a more secluded supernatural world. In the mountains outside the town lies Wuyou Water Fort, a hidden residence belonging to the demon Liuniang. Its location is difficult to find without a map, and it provides a link between the town and the history of the demons associated with Qilin Mountain.

=== Qilin Mountain ===
Qilin Mountain was once the home of a powerful community of demons, but it was destroyed more than twenty years before the main events of the story. Its former location is difficult to identify because the surrounding mountains are protected by powerful illusions. These mirages were created by a demon with the ability to conceal the mountain, making it possible for false landscapes to appear real and hiding the remains of the original settlement from those searching for it.

The mountain's destruction left behind a place associated with loss and the history of the conflict between humans and demons. Although the physical settlement no longer exists as it once did, its past remains accessible through memories and supernatural illusions. The concealment of the mountain also means that travellers cannot rely entirely on what they see: some of the apparent mountains in the surrounding region are illusions rather than real geographical features.

== Episodes ==
No.	Episode title	Synopsis
1.	Falling into the World of Demon Catchers	Ling Miao Miao (Yu Shuxin - Esther Yu) is an ordinary office worker and devoted reader of author Fu Zhou's novels. After criticising his latest story, Catching Demons, she is mysteriously transported into its fictional world and takes on the identity of Lin Yu, the magistrate's daughter and a minor villainess. Lin Yu is considered arrogant and is universally hated in the novel serving as the story's toxic third-wheel villain. A system informs her that she must complete a series of missions to return home. Her first task involves marrying Liu Fuyi (Yang Shize), but the wedding becomes a dangerous encounter with a Mirror Demon. During the battle, Ling Miao Miao meets Mu Sheng (Ding Yuxi), the mysterious and ruthless younger brother of Mu Yao (Zhu Xudan). Miaomiao quickly realises that surviving this fictional world will be far more complicated than she imagined. Miaomiao is killed instantly over and over by lightning strikes Mu Sheng's sword whenever she tries to run away or break character, quickly realising that survival means playing the part of a scheming villainess.
2.	Suspicion	Mu Sheng becomes suspicious of Miaomiao, believing she may have deliberately taken Liu Fuyi's protective talisman to endanger his sister, Mu Yao. Meanwhile, Miaomiao is delighted to discover that Lin Yu's father looks exactly like her own deceased father. Determined to prevent the tragic events she remembers from the novel, she intervenes when a maid named Huayi is about to take her own life. The system then assigns Miaomiao another task: interfere with Mu Yao's medication. After repeatedly dying at Mu Sheng's hands, she eventually discovers that Mu Yao is reacting to the glaze on the medicine pot rather than the medicine itself.
3.	Task Three For a Beginner	Miaomiao grows closer to Mu Yao and begins enjoying the friendship, much to Mu Sheng's irritation. The system assigns her a new task involving the destruction of the Mu family's treasured Mountain and Sea Map, which Mu Yao hopes will help her located the Vengeful Woman. Miaomiao struggles with the idea of betraying her new friends, particularly after overhearing Mu Sheng and Mu Yao discussing her. Despite several failed attempts, she eventually completes the tas by confessing her feelings to Mu Sheng, allowing her to pass the beginner missions.
4.	Hidden Task	With her beginner protection period ending, Miaomiao discovers that she must now complete a much more difficult mission: make Mu Sheng fall in love with her. His initial favourability rating is at -200% making the task feel impossible. Meanwhile, Mu Sheng's relationship with Mu Yao deteriorates after an argument about his background and her search for the Vengeful Woman. Miaomiao attempts to repair the damage and prevent the tragic events she remembers from the novel. She also learns that the upcoming Lantern Festival could have serious consequences for her father's future.
5.	Lantern Festival	Miaomiao attempts to improve Mu Sheng's opinion of her while also helping Mu Yao reconnect with happier childhood memories. She reminds Mu Yao of a promise made to Mu Sheng during an earlier Lantern Festival encouraging her to give him the lantern he had always wanted. The four characters enjoy the celebrations together, and Mu Sheng's attitude towards Miaomiao begins to soften. However, the evening takes a dangerous turn when a fire breaks out at the grain warehouse. Miaomiao discovers that her father has been caught up in a much larger scheme involving the Dowager Zhao and her financial dealings.
6.	The Real World in "dreams"	Following the warehouse incident, Lin Fu resigns from his official position and gives away much of his wealth, leaving him and Miaomiao to adjust to a simpler life. Miaomiao comforts him by sharing memories of her real-world childhood and the loss of her father. She explains this experience as a dream. Mu Sheng overhears their conversation and begins to understand her more deeply. Meanwhile, the group prepares to leave on their demon-hunting journey. Miaomiao persuades Mu Yao to let her accompany them, and Mu Sheng privately reveals that he had a hand in the destruction of the Mountain and Sea Map.
7.	Half-demon	As a group begins travelling together, Mu Yao agrees to teach Miaomiao basic magical skills. Mu Sheng also becomes involved in her training, although his teaching methods are far from patient. During a lesson, a Water Demon attacks Miaomiao and dicovers that Mu Sheng possesses demon blood. When Mu Sheng is injured, he attempts to conceal his identity by trapping everyone inside a magical barrier. His powers become unstable as the demon continues attacking. Miaomiao refuses to abandon him, even after his demonic nature is exposed, and her reaction surprises Mu Sheng.
8.	Increasing Favorabiility	Following the revelation about Mu Sheng's identity, Miaomiao becomes increasingly concerned about the prejudice he faces as someone with demon blood. Their relationship begins to change as he gradually allows her closer to him. Miamiao runs into the timid little bamboo shoot demon, Cuicui (Lu Yuhao), in the bamboo forest after getting caught in his harmless trap, and she immediately steps in to protect him from Mu Sheng. Meanwhile, the Water Demon King remains a threat, and the group must continue investigating the mysterious attacks. Miaomiao's efforts to understand Mu Sheng's feelings lead to increasingly intimate moments between them, while Mu Sheng struggles to reconcile his growing affection with his distrust of others.
9.	Missing Persons	After Mu Sheng's aura attracts dangerous demons into Cuicui's home, Cuicui has to leave the forest and ends up tagging along with the group, becoming an official part of the "Four Heroes of the Bamboo Forest." Miaomiao continues developing her magical abilities as the group investigates a series of disappearances connected to the Valley of the Lost. The investigation leads them towards Guo Xiu, whose actions suggest that he is concealing important information. As the group searches for answers, Miaomiao discovers that the events unfolding around them are not necessarily following the original storyline of the novel.
10.	Enter the Mitu Valley	The group ventures into the Valley of the Lost, where mysterious forces and magical illusions make it difficult to distinguish reality from deception. As they investigate the disappearances, each character faces dangers that test their abilities, and trust in one another. Miaomiao must rely on her knowledge of the novel and her growing demon-hunting skills to help the others navigate the increasingly dangerous situation.
11.	Water Demons	The investigation reveals that villagers have been trapped inside enormous water bubbles by the demons. As the group attempts to rescue them, Mu Sheng finds himself in danger while protecting others. Miaomiao becomes increasingly worried about his safety, particularly as his demonic abilities and unstable powers make him vulnerable to further attacks.
12.	Transaction	The Water Demon crisis continues as the group struggles to contain the threat and protect the villagers. Mu Yao rushes to help Miaomiao and Mu Sheng, while the group works together to uncover the demon's motives. Guo Xiu's involvement and the events surrounding the valley become clearer, although questions remain about the forces manipulating the situation.
13.	World Boundary	After the events in the valley, the group turns its attention towards the capital and the wider world of demon hunters. Miaomiao becomes increasingly determined to prevent Mu Sheng from following the dark path described in the original novel.The group receives important information that draws them towards the Bureau of Astronomy, where larger secrets about the world and its supernatural history begin to emerge.
14.	Four Bamboo Masters	The four companions, Ling Miaomiao, Mu Sheng, Mu Yao and Liu Fuyi, arrive in the capital and Miaomiao officially gives the group the name the "Four Heroes of the Bamboo Grove." She hopes that their friendship will keep everyone together, particularly Mu Sheng. However the capital proves to be a dangerous place, with demons being exploited and sold. The group also becomes involved in investigating the strange behaviour of Princess Dayang, whose impending marriage appears to be connected to a mysterious supernatural distrubance.
15.	One's Heart	The "Four Heroes of the Bamboo Grove" investigates the strange events surrounding Princess Danyang and encounters a young nobleman whose behaviour raises suspicions. Meanwhile, Miaomiao and Mu Sheng investigate a shop involved in the exploitation of demons. An unusual fragrance causes both of them to experience visions of their deepest desires, exposing feelings neither of them is prepared to acknowledge. The incident leaves them embarrassed but brings them closer together.
16.	Breaking Off the Engagement	The investigation into the princess' condition deepens as the group uncovers the involvement of people close to the royal household. The princess' apparent illness and the circumstances surrounding her engagement are not what they initially seem. Mu Sheng and Miaomiao continue to develop feelings for each other, while Mu Yao and Liu Fuyi investigate the supernatural clues. The group must determine who is responsible before the situation escalates further.
17.	Meteor Shower	As the group continues investigating the royal family's secrets, Miaomiao becomes increasingly aware of the feelings developing between her companions. She attempts to encourage Mu Yao and Liu Fuyi's relationship while navigating her own complicated feelings for Mu Sheng. A romantic moment under a meteor shower brings the group closer together, although unresolved secrets and misunderstandings threaten their happiness.
18.	The Confession	The truth surrounding the great fire and the events that shapes Mu Yao's family begin to emerge. Miaomiao becomes caught between desire to protect Mu Sheng and her attempts to follow the system's instructions. When an important romantic misunderstanding develops, Mu Sheng is left deeply hurt. Miaomiao continues attempting to manipulate the original storyline and the emotional cost of concealing the truth.
19.	Heartbroken Brothers	Mu Sheng struggles with heartbreak after Miaomiao gets engaged to the Young Marquis, Zhao Ruoshi (Xu Haiqiao). Initially, Miaomiao rejects his confession but as the Young Marquis slips a wooden bracelet (made from the Hair of the Goddess Mei) onto Miaomiao's wrist as a parting gift, its enchantment completely alters her feelings prompting her to propose and set a wedding date. Liu Fuyi also faces emotional difficulties, and the two men find themselves drinking together and sharing their frustrations. Meanwhile, the Four Heroes of the Bamboo Grove face a new supernatural threat as the Vengeful Woman's power begins to grow. Their personal problems must be put aside as the danger surrounding them becomes increasingly serious.
20.	Follow Your Heart	Miaomiao and Mu Sheng are brought back together as they confront their feelings and the misunderstandings that have separated them. Miaomiao begins to understand the depth of Mu Sheng's affection, while he struggles to express emotions he has spent much of his life hiding. Elsewhere, the princess' condition takes a disturbing turn suggesting a powerful demonic force is manipulating events behind the scenes.
21.	Human Sacrifice	Mu Sheng becomes more open about his feelings for Maiomiao, while the group prepares to confront the growing supernatural threat. The Four Heroes of the Bamboo Grove work together to investigate the source of the disturbances. Their investigation leads to revelations about former concubine Zhao and the sacrifices and wrongdoing connected to the royal household. The characters must confront the consequences of past actions while preparing for a much larger battle.
22.	The Guardian Master	The Nightmare Demon destroys its own demon core when it realises it is about to become defeated. This causes the entire formation beneath the Hall of Flourishing Goodness to collapse. Mu Yao disovers that her father had sealed the demon's core inside the formation, meaning that simply destroying the demon will not stop the disaster. With the formation threatening to destroy the capital, she decides to enter it and replace the demon core with her own inner core. Mu Sheng and Liu Fuyi accompany her, while Miaomiao calls Guo Xiu and the other astronomers for assistance. As the formation becomes increasingly unstable, Miaomiao enters the system space and unlocks the dangerous Apocalypse Divine Power. She uses it to help stabilise the formation, although doing so comes at the cost of her memories of the modern world. After the crisis, the astronomers notice that Miaomiao resembles the legendary Mu Qingshi and mistakenly believe she may be the prophesised saviour. However, when she cannot draw the Crescent Moon Sword, Mu Sheng steps forward and pulls it from its resting place with ease. Meanwhile, Mu Yao remains troubled by her father's involvement in the formation and the jade pendant found in Dowager Zhao's possession. She decides to question the imprisoned dowager.
23.	The Nature	Dowager Zhao reveals that Mu Yao's father was involved in the events surrounding the fire at Xing Shan Hall, leaving Mu Yao struggling to reconcile the truth with her memories of him. The group learns from Master Wenxin that a catastrophe will destroy the world in three years and sets off for Ran Valley to find him. Along the way, Miaomiao's memories of her former life begin to fade. Mu Sheng also receives a bracelet belonging to his mother from the Young Marquis, who reveals that they share the same father.
24.	The Catastrophe of Heaven	Mu Sheng's half-demon identity is exposed when Master Wenxin forces him into a formation that reveals his true nature. Mu Yao is shocked to discover that her younger brother is part demon, particularly because everyone else in their group already knew. Wenxin insists that Mu Yao must kill Mu Sheng, arguing that a member of the prestigious Mu demon-hunting family cannot tolerate a demon within its own household. He even takes Liu Fuyi's sword and places it in Mu Yao's hands. Mu Sheng does not defend himself, leaving the decision to his sister. However, Mu Yao refuses to turn against the boy she has raised as her own brother. She tells Wenxin that Mu Sheng's demon blood does not change their relationship and that he has done nothing to deserve her punishment. When Wenxin attacks Mu Sheng, a formation separates them from the others. Mu Sheng's true shadow is revealed to be a lotus, rather than the monstrous image Wenxin had initially suggested. Later, Mu Yao admits how deeply hurt she is that Mu Sheng never trusted her enough to tell her the truth. She realises that she has spent years worrying about protecting him without understanding what he has endured. When she apologises, Mu Sheng finally breaks down and cries. The group is then introduced to the unusual community living in Ran Valley, where humans and demons coexist peacefully. Cui Cui is reunited with his long-lost grandfather, Qingqing. Wenxin warns everyone that a blood moon will appear in three months, bringing another catastrophe. He also shows them memories of the disaster that occurred 900 years earlier, in which the legendary Mu Qingshi saved humanity. The group is astonished to discover that Mu Qingshi looks exactly like Miaomiao.
25.	The Map	Mu Sheng begins to question Wenxin's motives and learns more about the prophecy surrounding the coming catastrophe. The group discovers that Mu Yao's father had been collecting demon cores in preparation for the disaster. Mu Sheng and Miaomiao travel to Qiling Mountain to investigate his past, while Mu Yao and Liu Fuyi head to Cainan to find materials needed to repair the Hundred Demon Atlas.
26.	Tears	In Cainan, Liu Fuyi finally tells Mu Yao about the events that shaped his childhood. His parents were bandits who were executed when he was only six years old, leaving him alone and unwanted. The villagers of Liuru took pity on him and raised him as one of their own. During this time, he befriended a little girl he found injured in the mountains. He brought her food and clothing, unaware that she was a phantom demon. One day, she slaughtered the entire village, including the children who had become his friends. Liu Fuyi killed her in revenge and was later rescued by his master. He explains that his decision to become a demon hunter was partly an attempt to atone for the deaths of the villagers. Mu Yao understands that he has carried this guilt for years and reassures him that he was only a child when the tragedy occurred. Meanwhile, Miaomiao and Mu Sheng arrive in Wufang Town, where they meet the storyteller Lord Jiyue. He reveals that his popular stories were taken from mysterious pearls containing the memories of women who once worked at the Flower Fragrance Pavilion. The pearls lead Mu Sheng to Liuniang, a demon who knew his mother, the Enchantress. Liuniang gives him a red pearl containing memories of his parents and tells him that his mother and the Marquess of Qingyi fell in love before he was born. Mu Sheng is shaken by the revelation, as he has always believed his mother abandoned him. In Cainan, Mu Yao and Liu Fuyi discover that the villagers they thought had died years earlier are somehow alive. They meet Shi Niangzi and her husband, Li Zhun, and learn that an unusual creature called the Icy Jade Silkworm may be able to help restore the Hundred Demons Atlas.
27.	Lost Memories	Mu Sheng follows Liuniang to the remains of Qilin Mountain, where she begins showing him memories of his mother. He discovers that the Enchantress rescued Liuniang when she was a young demon, and the two women became as close as sisters. The Enchantress later fell in love with the Marquess of Qingyi and gave birth to Mu Sheng, a half-demon. The marquis initially wanted to abandon his noble position and live with her, but he never returned after leaving to negotiate with the demon hunters. When Mu Sheng's mother discovered that the marquis had married another woman, she was devastated. Her powers gradually weakened, but she refused to abandon her unborn child. She eventually gave birth to Mu Sheng and sacrificed much of her own strength to keep him alive. To protect him from the demon hunters, she placed a Forgetfulness Curse on him, making him believe she had abandoned him. She also tied the ribbon in his hair as protection. Realising that his mother's actions were driven by love rather than rejection, Mu Sheng finally recovers the memories that had been taken from him. Liuniang, however, has her own motives. She wants Mu Sheng's demon core and the Glazed Heart so she can restore the Enchantress, even if doing so means killing him. Meanwhile, Mu Yao and Liu Fuyi grow closer in Cainan. The villagers arrange a private wedding celebration for them, and Mu Yao affectionately calls Liu Fuyi by his childhood nickname, Maodan. Their happiness is short-lived, however, when the villagers suddenly begin behaving strangely and appear to be under the control of an unseen force.
28.	Fall Into the Trap	Mu Yao and Liu Fuyi's newly married life is interrupted when Mu Yao begins hearing a mysterious voice calling her name. Investigating the strange behaviour of the villagers, she discovers that they all have scars on their chests. She suspects that Shi Niangzi has been concealing something and asks Guo Xiu to investigate the Icy Jade Silkworms and the Qihun Flower. Guo Xiu discovers that these items attract phantom demons, creatures that undergo several transformations before becoming extremely powerful. Mu Yao soon realises that Liu Fuyi is in danger, but when she tries to leave the village with him, he turns against her. He has already been placed under the control of Chu Chu, a phantom demon who was once the little girl Liu Fuyi rescued as a child. Chu Chu has manipulated his memories and uses magical threads to control him. When Liu Fuyi attacks Mu Yao, she discovers that he has a scar on his chest, just like the other villagers. Chu Chu reveals that she is the daughter Shi Niangzi and Li Zhun lost ten years earlier. Unable to accept her daughter's death, Shi Niangzi made a bargain with the phantom demon to bring Chu Chu back. The villagers have also been revived using demonic power, rather than genuinely brought back to life. Meanwhile, Miaomiao wakes up with no memory of Mu Sheng or their relationship. Liuniang has deliberately erased her memories so that Mu Sheng can be killed without her interference. Mu Sheng is trapped in Liuniang's formation, where she intends to use his demon core and the Glazed Heart to resurrect the Enchantress.
29.	Revive	Shi Niangzi's deception begins to unravel when Li Zhun reveals that he has known she was a demon for years. He understands that she made the bargain with Chu Chu because she could not bear losing their daughter, but he no longer wants her to keep sacrificing others for his sake. Shi Niangzi eventually agrees to help Mu Yao stop Chu Chu. During Chu Chu's final transformation, she plans to consume Mu Yao's heart and uses her control over Liu Fuyi to carry out the attack. Shi Niangzi secretly poisons Chu Chu, weakening her during the vulnerable cocooning process. Guo Xiu arrives to help, while Mu Yao is forced to fight Liu Fuyi, unable to bring herself to kill the man she loves. When her tears finally break through Chu Chu's illusion, Liu Fuyi regains control of himself and cuts the magical threads controlling him. He tells Chu Chu that he would rather die than continue living as her puppet. He collapses in Mu Yao's arms, but Shi Niangzi uses her own demon power and the silkworms to save his life. Elsewhere, Miaomiao realises that her missing memories are connected to Mu Sheng and refuses to accept that she has forgotten him. She confronts Liuniang and discovers the truth about the Enchantress: rather than abandoning her child, the Enchantress gave her life and demon core to protect him. Liuniang finally understands that her resentment towards Mu Sheng was misplaced. She abandons her plan to resurrect the Enchantress and releases him. Before leaving, she gives Mu Sheng and Miaomiao a pearl containing further memories of his mother. Mu Sheng learns just how deeply his parents loved each other and finally gains control of the Crescent Moon Sword.
30.	Farewell	With the Cainan crisis over, Mu Yao and Liu Fuyi return to the group, and the Four Heroes of the Bamboo Grove are reunited. Liu Fuyi is still grieving the villagers he lost and must come to terms with the fact that some things cannot be undone. Shi Niangzi, having sacrificed herself to save him, is left behind with Li Zhun. Wenxin gives Li Zhun a book containing the Lu family's secret techniques, encouraging him to continue living despite his loss. Meanwhile, Wenxin uses the silkworm silk to repair the Hundred Demons Atlas. Mu Sheng confronts Wenxin about the mysterious woman he once saw imprisoned in the Mu family dungeon. He learns that she was not his mother, but the Resentful Woman: a demon created when a demoness loses her Glazed Heart. Mu Yao's father had taken the Enchantress's heart, believing that doing so would allow him to become a Heaven-grade demon hunter. Instead, his actions transformed her into the powerful ninth-rank Resentful Woman. Mu Sheng also discovers that he unknowingly helped her escape years earlier by bringing her tea and breaking the formation that imprisoned her. Now determined to restore his mother, he asks Wenxin to help return the Glazed Heart to her, even if doing so means losing his own demon core. As the New Year approaches, the group enjoys a rare period of happiness together. Miaomiao describes snow to Mu Sheng, who has never experienced it, and he uses his powers to create a snowfall for her. Everyone makes dumplings, plays in the snow and celebrates together. However, the happiness is short-lived. Mu Yao reveals to Wenxin that she knows the Resentful Woman is inside her own body. She has decided to enter the Demon-Sealing Tower and sacrifice herself to destroy the demon before it can cause the coming catastrophe.
31.	Demon Trap Tower	Mu Yao enters the Demon-Sealing Tower without telling the others, intending to destroy the Resentful Woman even if it costs her life. When Mu Sheng, Miaomiao and Liu Fuyi discover what she has done, they follow her into the tower. Wenxin has known for some time that the Resentful Woman lives inside Mu Yao, but he has been unable to find another way to destroy her. Inside the tower, the group must pass through a series of dangerous levels, each containing demons and trials. Liu Fuyi recognises several of the demons he previously captured and discovers that some have been searching for an escape. He allows three relatively harmless demons to pass, but the journey becomes increasingly difficult. Cui Cui is eventually left behind because the lower levels are too dangerous for him. Liu Fuyi, Mu Sheng and Miaomiao continue downwards, fighting their way through the tower. Each time Liu Fuyi opens one of the magical gates, he suffers a painful backlash. By the eighth level, he is badly injured and collapses after opening the next gate. He begs Mu Sheng and Miaomiao to continue without him and rescue Mu Yao. On the ninth and final level, they find Mu Yao apparently imprisoned, but Miaomiao realises that the woman before them is actually the Resentful Woman using Mu Yao's appearance. The demon separates herself from Mu Yao and reveals that she has been manipulating events for years. She also explains that Mu Sheng was deliberately drawn into the Mu family as part of her plan. When the Resentful Woman takes control of the tower, all the demons are forced to kneel before her, including Cui Cui and Mu Sheng. Outside the tower, Qingqing sacrifices his own life force to stabilise the formation and give Wenxin another opportunity to correct his mistakes. His sacrifice finally makes Wenxin realise that his determination to destroy all demons has been wrong. During the battle, Miaomiao remembers that the Resentful Woman previously tried to take over Mu Sheng's body but was prevented by the protective ribbon his mother had placed in his hair. The demon manages to control Mu Sheng and turns him against Miaomiao, but he fights against her influence. When the Resentful Woman strikes at Miaomiao, Mu Sheng protects her and takes the attack himself. His demon core then merges with the Apocalypse Divine Power, giving him extraordinary strength. He transforms into a powerful ninth-rank demon and uses the Crescent Moon Sword to destroy the Resentful Woman. However, the effort drains his life force, and he begins to disappear in Miaomiao's arms. The system announces that Mu Sheng's affection level has finally reached 100 per cent and that Miaomiao has completed her mission. She is offered the chance to return to the modern world, but she refuses to leave everyone behind. Having already lost her memories of her former life, Miaomiao uses the remaining Apocalypse Divine Power to bring Mu Sheng, Mu Yao and Liu Fuyi back to life. Mu Sheng awakens and realises that the woman beside him is Lin Yu rather than the Miaomiao he loves. He refuses to accept this ending and travels to the Orchid Veil, where he meets Mu Qingshi, who looks exactly like Miaomiao. She explains that Miaomiao chose to sacrifice herself for him and that he has the power to reverse time. Mu Sheng uses this ability to return to the earlier battle, giving himself and Miaomiao another chance to defeat the Resentful Woman together. This time they succeed, Mu Yao survives, Liu Fuyi is saved and the group escapes the collapsing tower. Qingqing, however, cannot be brought back.
32.	Initial Mission	Although the Resentful Woman has finally been defeated, the sky suddenly turns blood-red and the Catastrophe of Heaven begins. Miaomiao realises that killing the Resentful Woman has not prevented the disaster because she was never its true source. She finally understands that the catastrophe is connected to Fu Zhou, the author who created their world. Miaomiao explains that she is not Lin Yu but Ling Miaomiao, a woman from the modern world where Fu Zhou is a famous novelist. She had been a devoted reader of his work before being transported into his story. She also realises that Catching Demons was not one of Fu Zhou's later novels, but the very first story he wrote as a child. Fu Zhou had a difficult childhood and suffered from a rare condition that left him isolated from other children. During this period, he created a world filled with misunderstandings, resentment and tragic endings. Miaomiao believes that the only person who can change the ending is the child who originally wrote the story. Mu Sheng begins to understand what she means and asks Cui Cui to use his powers to communicate with the demons and people throughout the world. Cui Cui transforms into a vast bamboo forest, allowing the different groups to connect and work together. At the Imperial Observatory, the young marquis helps organise the construction of a bridge reaching towards the heavens. Demon hunters, spirits, demons and even the smallest dust demons contribute their powers to build the enormous staircase. Miaomiao and Mu Sheng climb towards the sky together, but when Mu Sheng turns around, Miaomiao has disappeared. He finds himself inside a room in the modern world, where a young Fu Zhou is hiding in a cupboard, crying after another difficult experience at school. Mu Sheng realises that he is Fu Zhou himself. Through the memories of the young boy, he discovers that Miaomiao was once his classmate and the girl who brought happiness into his lonely childhood. She had defended him when he was bullied and had given him a pen before leaving school. Fu Zhou had never forgotten her. He later wrote her into his stories, using his novels to express feelings he had never been able to tell her directly. As an adult, Fu Zhou returns to school and decides to undergo surgery for his illness. Before the operation, he makes three wishes: that the story he wrote as a child could have a happier ending, that the girl he loves might one day understand his feelings, and that he might survive to tell her the truth. Mu Sheng returns to the fantasy world and tells Miaomiao that he is Fu Zhou and that the stories he wrote were connected to his feelings for her. As the catastrophe continues to destroy the world, Miaomiao refuses to abandon him. She chooses to stay and help him, even though she knows she may never return to her former life. Mu Sheng gently kisses her forehead before using his own life force to stop the catastrophe. The story then returns to the modern world, where Miaomiao wakes at her desk and initially believes that everything was a dream. She resumes her ordinary working life but cannot shake the feeling that she has forgotten someone important. Later, she attends a book-signing event for Fu Zhou, whose novel has been reissued with a new ending. She notices Cui Cui and Qingqing at the venue, selling ice cream, and begins to experience flashes of recognition. Just as she is trying to understand why everything seems so familiar, someone approaches her. Fu Zhou has returned, and the final scene strongly suggests that Miaomiao and the man she loved in the fictional world have found each other again.

== Soundtrack ==
No.	English title	Chinese title	Artist	Lyrics	Composer	Notes
1.	"Surge"	澎湃	Yu Shuxin	Chen Tian	Lu Yanming	
2.	"Moonlight Thoughts"	寄明月	Yu Shuxin, Ding Yuxi, Zhu Xudan, Yang Shize, Li Yizhen, Fei Qiming & Lu Yuhao	Li Maoyang		Promotional song
3.	"Before the Eternal Night"	永夜之前	Curley G	Zhao Subing, Chen Tian	Chen Tian, Ji Cuixi	Theme song
4.	"Reconstruct"	重塑	Du Zhiwen	Lin Qiao, Liu Enxun	Du Zhiwen	
5.	"Stare Intently"	凝眸	Cyndi Wang	Chen Kexin	Hu Chen	
6.	"Stare Intently"	凝眸	Zhang Yuan	Chen Kexin	Hu Chen	
7.	"Stare Intently"	凝眸	Cyndi Wang & Zhang Yuan	Chen Kexin	Hu Chen	
8.	"Flawless"	无瑕	Li Qi	Tang Simiao	Ha Ye	
9.	"Stare Intently"	凝眸	Ding Yuxi	Chen Kexin	Hu Chen	
10.	"After the Eternal Night"	永夜之后	Twins	Riley Lam	Chen Tian, Ji Cuixi	

== Production ==
Filming of the drama began in Hengdian World Studios on August 9, 2023, and the whole drama shooting was completed on December 23 of the same year. The opening ceremony was held on August 30, 2023. A wrap-up special was released on January 2, 2024.
