= Fateful Love =

2024 Chinese TV series

- 流光引
- Genre: Historical, fantasy
- Based on: Poisonous Pampered Mercenary Princess Consort by Mao Xiaomao
- Written by: Wang Yu; Liao Xiaoyu
- Directed by: Cheng Yuanhai
- Starring: Hans Zhang; Zhu Xudan
- Country of origin: China
- Original language: Mandarin
- No. of episodes: 40

Production
- Production location: Xiangshan Global Studios
- Running time: ≈40 minutes per episode

Original release
- Network: Tencent Video
- Release: August 30 – September 20, 2024

Fateful Love (流光引) is a 2024 Chinese romance fantasy television series adapted from the web novel Poisonous Pampered Mercenary Princess Consort (毒宠佣兵王妃). The series was directed by Cheng Yuanhai (程源海), who previously directed Ruyi's Royal Love in the Palace, and written by Wang Yu, who wrote Hi, Mom. Starring Hans Zhang and Zhu Xudan, it was first released on Tencent Video on 30 August 2024.

== Premise ==
Han Ziqing was commissioned by a biological company to retrieve an undetermined matter in a remote location. Han unfortunately fainted after pulling out a dagger in a cave. After coming to her senses, Han Ziqing found herself possessing someone similarly named in an ancient city. Han Ziqing in this period is the daughter born from the prime minister of the Tianque dynasty and his concubine. She finds herself entwined with the fourth prince, Jun Beiyue, in her quest to return to her reality.

== Cast ==
- Hans Zhang as Jun Beiyue (君北月)
- Zhu Xudan as Han Zhiqing (韩紫晴)
- Yao Chi as Xuanyuan Lige (轩辕离歌)
- Hai Ling as Chu Feiyan (楚飞燕)
- Ren Shihao as Baili Weisheng (百里尾生)
- Luo Shiqi as Nangong Qianqian (南宫芊芊)
- Wang Haoxiang as Situ Haonan (司徒浩南)
- Peng Yaqi as Xuanyuan Zhaoxi (轩辕昭汐)
- Li Yuxuan as Jun Beichen (君北辰)
- Sun Yi as Shadow (影子)
- Gao Qing plays Shi Liang (十两)
- Chang Dandan as Hongyi (红衣)
- Liu Xiaohu as King Nanzhao (南照王)
- Jin Hui as King Tianque (天阙王)
- Zhang Yufei as Queen Tianque (天阙王后)

== Production ==
The drama started filming at Xiangshan Global Studios in July 2021, and completed filming in November 2021.

== Reception ==
The Paper wrote that although the television series completed in 2021 and was only released in 2024 with almost no fanfare, it still received significant attention from the public, and managed to be listed on the top charts in China. While Hans Zhang's character styling was criticised, the plot progression kept the audience hooked on the series. In Beijing Youth Daily's review, it highlighted the strong female characters in Han Zhiqing and Nangong Qianqian were major highlights of the series.
