= I've Fallen For You (TV series) =

- Genre: Romantic comedy Historical
- Based on: Jin Xin Ji by Han Xuefei
- Written by: Zhou Tong; Dai Mengying
- Directed by: Zhou Tong; Dai Mengying
- Starring: Yu Shuxin; Liu Yichang; Lou Mingjie; Chen Haolan
- Country of origin: China
- Original language: Mandarin
- No. of seasons: 2
- No. of episodes: 24

Production
- Production location: Hengdian World Studios
- Running time: 45 minutes
- Production companies: iQIYI; Cool Whale Production; Yingmei Media

Original release
- Network: iQIYI
- Release: February 14, 2020

I've Fallen For You (Chinese: 少主且慢行; pinyin: Shǎo zhǔ qiěmàn xíng) is a 2020 Chinese television series starring Yu Shuxin, Liu Yichang, Luo Mingjie, and Chen Haolan. The series is adapted from the novel Jin Xin Ji (锦心记) by Han Xuefei, and premiered on iQIYI with multi-languages subtitles on February 14, 2020.

The series is divided into two seasons, each season consists of 12 episodes, for a total of 24 episodes.

== Synopsis ==
The story follows Tian Sanqi (Yu Shuxin), a quirky female investigator who has a strange liking for performing autopsies. She begins her journey to find her true love, due to a childhood promise made to her by a little boy. She befriends different people on her journey, and accidentally chances upon a few crime cases that is related to her friend's disappearance years ago. Together with her new-found mates, they begin to unravel the new-found mystery and a shocking conspiracy that is 10 years in the making comes to light.

== Cast ==
- Yu Shuxin as Tian Sanqi
- Liu Yichang as Zhao Cuo
- Luo Mingjie as Bai Yifei
- Chen Haolan as He Ruoyao
- Liu Xun as He Zhen
- Zhang Yuankun as Li Jia
- Cao Mingyue as Duan Xuewei
  - Chen Yitong as young Duan Xuewei
- Zhang Zimeng as He Jinxin
- Lu Hanbiao as Zhao Quandui
- Wang Wei as Wu Meng
- Cui Yi as Nanny Ling

== Original soundtrack ==
No.	Title	Lyrics	Music	Artists	Length
1.	"I'm Falling in Love" (Opening theme song)	Saji	Jin Dazhou	Guo Jing, Ning Huanyu	3:01
2.	"Wander" (Ending theme song)	Zhang Chang	Jin Dazhou	Du Zhiwen	3:11
3.	"Ever Since Meeting You" (Female ver.)	Wang Shimi	Wang Shimi	Yu Shuxin	3:09
4.	"Ever Since Meeting You" (Male ver.)	Wang Shimi	Wang Shimi	Luo Mingjie	3:09
5.	"Goodbye Before We've Even Loved"	Zhang Chang	Junhyuk Park	Zhang Zining (Rocket Girls 101)	3:57
6.	"Old Man Ding"	Wang Shimi	Wang Shimi	Liu Yichang	2:00
7.	"The Yangtze River's Tale"	Li Zhiyi	Ren Bin	Liang Wen	2:06

== Production ==
The series began filming on July 26 and lasted until September 21, 2019. Filming took place at Hengdian World Studios.

== Awards and nominations ==
Year	Award	Category	Nominated work	Result	Ref.
2020	5th Golden Guduo Media Awards	Box Office Web Series of the Year	I've Fallen For You	Won	
2020	5th Golden Guduo Media Awards	Web Series of the Year	I've Fallen For You	Nominated	
2020	5th Golden Guduo Media Awards	Actress of the Year	Yu Shuxin	Nominated	
2020	5th Golden Guduo Media Awards	Rookie of the Year	Liu Yichang	Nominated	
