= Love You Seven Times =

2023 Chinese television series

- Official Poster
- Simplified Chinese: 七时吉祥
- Hanyu Pinyin: Qī Shí Jíxiáng
- Genre: Xianxia; Fantasy; Romance
- Based on: Seven Unfortunate Lifetimes, All Thanks to a Single Moment of Impulse by Jiulu Feixiang
- Written by: Li Lisha; Xu Hong
- Directed by: Li Nan; Du Lin
- Starring: Ding Yuxi; Yang Chaoyue
- Country of origin: China
- Original language: Mandarin
- No. of seasons: 1
- No. of episodes: 38

Production
- Executive producers: Dai Ying; Wang Yixu; Gong Yu; Zhang Yucheng
- Production location: Hengdian World Studios
- Editor: Wang Zhaonan
- Running time: 40 min
- Production companies: iQIYI; Stellar Media

Original release
- Network: iQIYI
- Release: 10 August – 6 September 2023

Related
- Love Between Fairy and Devil

Love You Seven Times (Chinese: 七时吉祥; pinyin: Qī Shí Jíxiáng) is a Chinese television series based on the web novel Seven Unfortunate Lifetimes, All Thanks to a Single Moment of Impulse by Jiulu Feixiang, starring Ding Yuxi and Yang Chaoyue. The series aired on iQIYI on August 10, 2023.

== Synopsis ==
It tells the story of Xiang Yun, a fairy of Marriage Pavilion who becomes entangled with the ancient God of War, Chu Kong due to the ancient red thread of fate. Because of this encounter, they must go through tribulation in the human world seven times.

== Cast and characters ==
=== Main ===
- Yang Chaoyue as Xiang Yun / Cang Hai / Song Xiangyun / Yang Xiaoxiang
  - Xiang Yun: A fairy of Marriage Pavilion who ends up becoming Chu Kong's love tribulation partner. In the fourth reincarnation, she is the princess of Qi Kingdom and General Chu Kong's wife.
  - Cang Hai: Former head of the Six realms and leader of Moluo Divine Clan. According to the Heavenly Divine Oracle, she was destined to become the devil who would exterminate the world
  - Song Xiangyun: Second reincarnation of Xiangyun in the mortal world. She is the only daughter of the Song family and Lu Changkong's fianceé
  - Yang Xiaoxiang: Third reincarnation of Xiangyun in the mortal world. She is a disciple of Shengling Sect.
- Ding Yuxi as Chu Kong / Lu Changkong
  - Chu Kong: Ancient God of War who fought against the devil Cang Hai 30,000 years ago. He is the second prince of Qilin Divine Clan and Emperor Haoxuan's younger brother. He later becomes the Demon King of Mystery Forest. In the third reincarnation, he is the Sect Leader of Shengling Sect and in the fourth reincarnation, he is the General of Qi Kingdom and princess Xiangyun's husband.
  - Lu Changkong: Second reincarnation of Chu Kong in the mortal world. He is the only son of the Lu family and Song Xiangyun's fiancé

=== Supporting ===
==== Heavenly Realm ====
- Xing Ze as Xiu Ming / Li Xiuming / Pei Xiuming
  - Xiu Ming: Royal descendant of Dixiu Divine Clan
  - Prince Ning / Li Xiuming: Reincarnation of Xiu Ming in the second love tribulation. He is the third prince of Chen Kingdom
  - Pei Xiuming: Reincarnation of Xiu Ming in the third love tribulation
- Zhang Xiaochen as Heavenly Emperor Haoxuan

Current head of the six realms, the first prince of Qilin Divine Clan, and Chu Kong's older brother

- Lei Pengyu as Immortal Zhao
- He Wenjun as Immortal Sun

Marriage Pavilion

- Yang Haoyu as Red Thread Master, Chief of the Marriage Pavilion
- Ning Jia as Jia Yun

Moluo Divine Clan

- Lin Bairui as Jin Lian / Lu Qianren / Jin Cheng
  - Jin Lian: Protector of Mouluo Divine Clan
  - Lu Qianren: Reincarnation of Jin Lian in the third love tribulation, chief of medicine pavilion
  - Jin Cheng: Jin Lian and Jin Luo's father and former protector of Mouluo Divine Clan
- Ge Qiugu as Xie Feng, guard of Moluo Divine Clan
- Lu Yuxiao as Jin Luo, twin sister of Jin Lian
- Zheng Guolin as Former Leader of Moluo Divine Clan and Cang Hai and Ming Yue's father
- Yang Chaoyue as Princess Ming Yue

Cang Hai's younger twin sister who was born with demonic power

Fate Bureau

- Yang Li as Goddess of Fate, Chief of the Fate Bureau
- Yang Mengen as Immortal Li, Xiangyun's best friend and an immortal in charge of writing the fate books for Xiangyun and Chu Kong's love tribulation.

Eastern Sea

- Zhang Xuehan as Ying Shi / Xie Yingshi
  - Ying Shi: Princess of the Eastern Sea
  - Xie Yingshi: Lu Changkong's adopted cousin
- Xue Ben as Xia Bing, Ying Shi's subordinate
- Zhang Xin as Xie Jiang, Ying Shi's subordinate

==== Mortal Realm ====
- Zhai Xiangyang as Zihui / Qian Mou, a Nuwa stone goblin who can take the form of a human
- Hai Lu as Wan Jun / Madame Yang / Empress Qi
  - Wan Jun: Song Xiangyun's mother in the second love tribulation
  - Madame Yang: Yang Xiaoxiang's mother in the third love tribulation
  - Empress Qi: Empress Dowager of Qi Kingdom
- Zheng Guo Lin as Song Qinwen / Chief Yang
  - Song Qinwen: Song Xiangyun's father in the second love tribulation
  - Chief Yang: Yang Xiaoxiang's father in the third love tribulation
- Liu Zeting as Lu Fang / Xiao Fang
  - Lu Fang: Servant of Lu family in the second love tribulation
  - Xiao Fang: Disciple of Shengling Sect in the third love tribulation
- Wang Xiao Yun Zi as Cui Bi

Maid of Xiangyun in the second and fourth love tribulation
Second love tribulation

- Yu Bo as Lu Liang, Lu Changkong's father
- Dong Xuan as Jie Zhen, Lu Changkong's mother
- Zhang Lei as Li Yan, emperor of Chen Kingdom
- Zhang Bozhi as Li Xiuzhe / Prince Nanyou, first prince of Chen Kingdom
- Li Yuhao as Li Xiuwen, second prince of Chen Kingdom

Fourth love tribulation

- Jiang Xirao as Xin Ran

==== Guest appearances ====
- Zhang Linghe as Chang Heng

== Production ==
Filming of the drama began in Hengdian World Studios on February 25, 2022 and the whole drama shooting was completed on May 9 of the same year.

== Original soundtrack ==
| No. | English title | Chinese title | Artist | Lyrics | Composer | Notes |
|---|---|---|---|---|---|---|
| 1. | Grieving Record | 哀情记 | A-Lin | Sun Wei, Wang Yuan | Mo Yuting | Closing theme song |
| 2. | Till the End of Time | 直到时间尽头 | Liu Yuning | Chen Tian | | |
| 3. | Breaking the Sky | 破空 | Li Changchao | Chen Kexin | Sun Wei | |
| 4. | Perimeters of the Heart | 心之方寸 | Ye Xuanqing | Tang Si Miao | Ni Luo | |
| 5. | Raining Everyday | 天天下雨 | 831 | Tang Si Miao | 阿书 Veson, Chen Haotian | |
| 6. | Time Is Speechless | 光阴无话 | Yu Chaoying | Xu Yuanyi, Le Yifan | Chen Haotian | |
| 7. | Nothing to Do with Love | 与爱无关 | Lala Hsu | Chen Tian, Wang Yixu | Chen Tian | |
| 8. | Remaining Feelings | 余味 | Shan Yichun | Chen Tian, Wang Yixu | Chen Tian | |
| 9. | Only Love | 唯爱 | Faye Chan | Chen Tian, Zhou Qingjue | Liu Yijun, Shen Jintian | Opening theme song |
| 10. | Yearner | 思相者 | Hu Xia | Tang Si Miao | 阿书 Veson | |
