= Zhang Zining =

Chinese singer (born 1996)

- 张紫宁
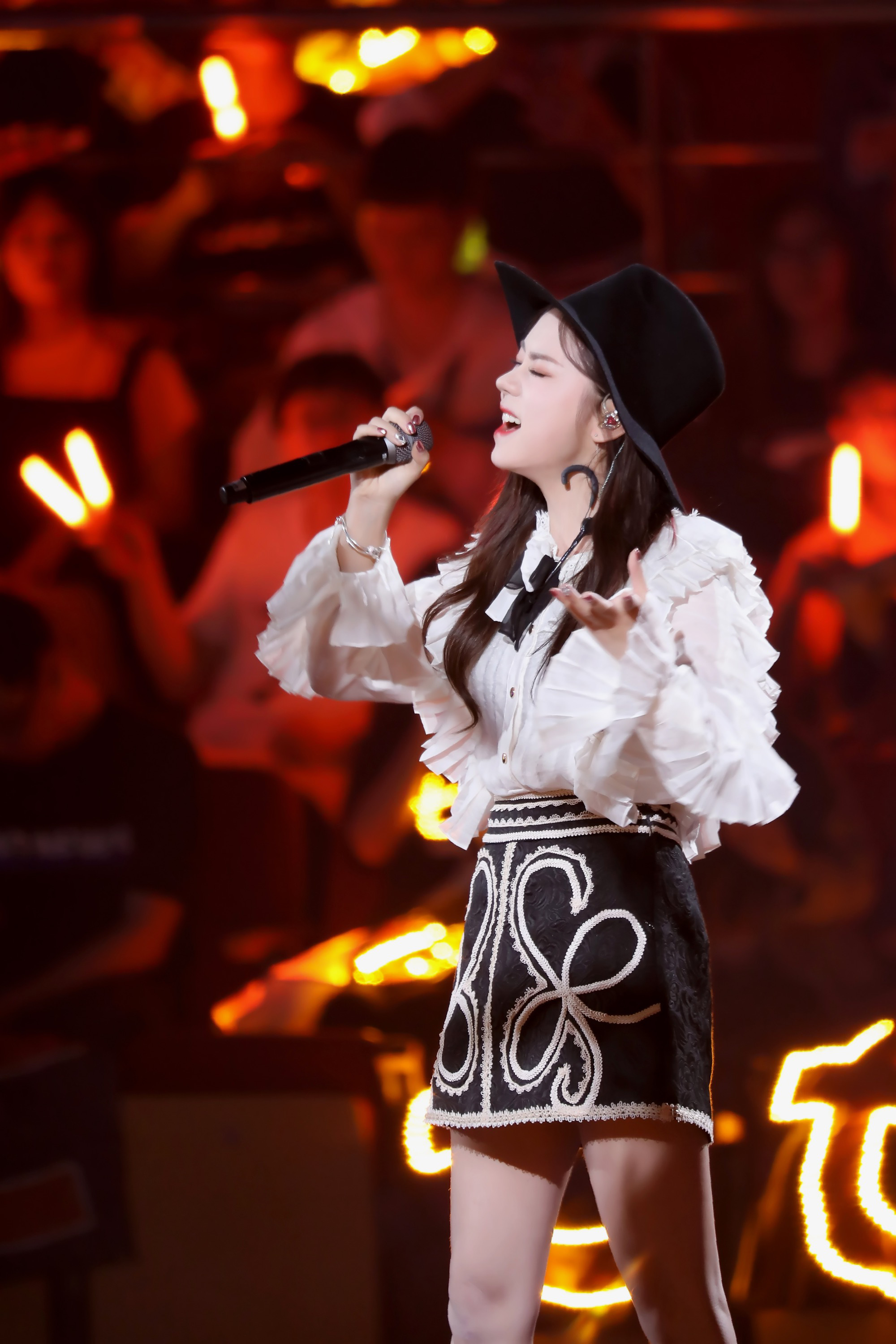
- Zining at a concert in Guangzhou, 2019
- Born: Zhang Zining; March 9, 1996 (age 30); Chengdu, Sichuan, China
- Occupation: Singer
- Musical career
- Also known as: Winnie 维尼
- Genres: C-pop; Mandopop
- Instrument: Vocals
- Years active: 2017–present
- Labels: 哇唧唧哇 WAJIJIWA Entertainment (2018–2020); 麦锐娱乐 Mavericks Entertainment (2017–present)
- Formerly of: Rocket Girls 101; Produce 101; MERA

Zhang Zining
- Simplified Chinese: 张紫宁
Transcriptions
Standard Mandarin
- Hanyu Pinyin: Zhāng Zǐníng

Zhang Zining (born March 9, 1996), known by her stage name Zining, is a Chinese singer. She was the main vocalist of Chinese girl group MERA before taking part in the survival show Produce 101 China. She debuted as a member of Rocket Girls 101 after finishing seventh on the show. Zining officially graduated from Rocket Girls 101 on June 23, 2020, 2 years after their formation. She now pursues a solo career.

== Early life and education ==
Zining was born in Chengdu, Sichuan, China. She majored in Music Performing (Vocal Performing) at the Communication University of China and graduated in June 2020.

== Career ==
=== 2017–2018: Debut with MERA ===
On August 16, 2017, Zining was officially introduced as a member of 5-member Chinese girl group MERA under Mavericks Entertainment during a debut launch event in Beijing and the group released their first mini album "天生".

=== 2018–2020: Produce 101 and Rocket Girls 101 ===
In 2018, Zining participated in the Chinese reality survival girl group show Produce 101 aired from April 21 to June 23 on Tencent Video. She finished seventh with 107,630,613 votes and successfully debuted as a member of Rocket Girls 101.

On August 9, 2018, Mavericks Entertainment released a statement with Yuehua Entertainment that Zining will be withdrawing from Rocket Girls 101 along with bandmates Meiqi and Xuanyi. However, on August 17, 2018, it was announced that they will be returning to the group after discussions with Tencent.

On January 27, 2019, Zining released her first self-composed song "我们" as the ending theme song for Rocket Girls 101's variety show "横冲直撞20岁" (Rampage to the Next Stop). She subsequently released three soundtracks, "萤火" as an ending theme song for drama "凤弈" (Legend of the Phoenix) on May 28, 2019, "虫儿飞" as an official cover of popular children's song on June 5, 2019, and "清平乐" as a promotional theme song for drama "长安十二时辰" (The Longest Day in Chang'an) on July 3, 2019, which was well received. As part of Rocket Girls 101's second album "立风", Zining released her solo song "自己" on July 12, 2019, in which she composed the lyrics for.

On February 8, 2020, Zining released "云边" as an ending theme song for drama "两世欢" (The Love Lasts Two Minds) and a week later on February 15, 2020, she released "不爱而别" as an insert song for drama "少主且慢行" (I've Fallen for You).

=== 2020–2021: Solo Career ===
After graduating from Rocket Girls 101 on June 23, 2020, Zining now pursues a solo career.

Zining subsequently announced her first solo album "莫尔" (MORE) which consists of 12 songs that were released sequentially from 2020 to 2021. On July 14, 2020, she released "我想我不一样" as a preview song for her solo album. The second song from the album, "平行又交替", was released on August 12, 2020, and features renowned singer A-Lin. The next three songs, "爱转", "你的情歌" and "苏西的世界" were released as an EP on September 6, 2020. Subsequently, the next three songs, "愉快纪念", "必需品" and "深信不疑" were released on November 4, 2020, December 6, 2020, and December 22, 2020, respectively. In 2021, Zining released the ninth song on her first solo album, "波特兰灯塔" on January 9 in which she composed the lyrics for and the tenth song "Blue Eyes" on January 31 in which she composed for her cat named Airy. The eleventh song which she composed the lyrics for, "我们可能就这样", was released on March 7, 2021. On March 28, 2021, the last song in which Zining composed, "其实也还好", was released.

Other than songs from her own solo album, Zining released various official song covers and soundtracks for Chinese dramas and mobile games. Zining released an official cover of "孤单北半球" on July 4, 2020, as part of the "Reset Youth Project" and an official cover of "独家记忆" on August 23, 2020, as part of the "Record Project" by NetEase Music. On July 29, 2020, she released "不服" as an insert song for drama "穿越火线" (Cross Fire). On November 11, 2020, Zining released "无罪说" as an ending theme song for drama "目标人物" (Target Person) and on November 29, 2020, she released "你好，再见" as a promotional theme song for drama "最初的相遇，最后的别离" (To Love).

In 2021, Zining released "心里" as an insert song for drama "假日暖洋洋" (Vacation of Love) on January 17 and "对立面" as an insert song for drama "玲珑" (The Blessed Girl) on January 25. On February 1, 2021, she released "Fight For Love" as a theme song for Chinese mobile game "Game for Peace"and on February 4, 2021, she released "戏春令" as a theme song for Chinese mobile game "Xuan Yuan Sword: Long Wu Yun Shan". On February 6, 2020, Zining released "恋爱三分甜" as an ending theme song for drama "扑通扑通喜欢你" (Make My Heart Smile) and on February 19, 2020, she released "梦归尽" as an insert song for drama "赘婿" (My Heroic Husband). On March 27, 2021, Zining released "念未别" as an insert song for drama "玉昭令" (No Boundary) and on May 15, 2021, she released "I wanna see you now" as an ending theme song for drama "皮囊之下" (Ugly Beauty). She then released "月下" as a theme song for drama "花好月又圆" (Truth or Dare) on June 3, 2021.

In the second half of the year on July 18, 2021, she released "After You 关于你" as an ending theme song for drama "法医秦明之无声的证词" (Silent Evidence). On September 8, 2021, she released an official cover of "最爱" and on November 15, 2021, she released another official cover of "连名带姓". Subsequently, on November 18, 2021, she released "落笔成殇" as a theme song for drama "潇洒佳人淡淡妆" (Beautiful Girl With Light Make-up) and on November 29, 2021, she released "好人坏人" as an insert song for drama "半暖时光" (The Memory About You). Zining then released "化" under the "Game Project" on December 16, 2021, and "星星" as the theme song for drama "清风朗月花正开" (The Flowers Are Blooming) on December 22, 2021.

=== 2022–present: Solo Career ===
In 2022, Zining announced the launch of her second solo album, "Rec. X". She released the first song titled "余生有你 (Remaining)" on January 26, 2022, and the second song titled "漂流" on February 28, 2022. She released the third song, "万毒不侵 (The Poison)" on her birthday on March 9, 2022, and fourth song, "Flee" on April 22, 2022. On May 31, 2022, she released the fifth song "淡水河 (Freedom)" and on July 9, 2022, she released her self-composed song named "2 SiX". On August 9, 2022, Zining released the seventh song "230am".

On February 20, 2022, Zining released "海风与晚星" as a single. She then released "等风吻你" as an ending theme song for drama "二进制恋爱" (Binary Love) on May 27, 2022, and "叙事诗" as an ending theme song for drama "妻子的选择" (Wife's Choice) on June 5, 2022.

On July 21, 2022, she released an official cover of "灰姑娘" and on August 4, 2022, she released another official cover of "是否我真的一无所有". Zining then released "她觉得" as an insert song for drama "玫瑰之战" on August 10, 2022, and "黑白之间" as a promotional theme song for drama "罚罪" on August 31, 2022. On September 13, 2022, she released "拥抱你的心跳" as an opening theme song for drama "亲爱的生命".

Subsequently, Zining released more songs. In 2023 and 2024, she appeared on variety shows Magical Musical Exercise Room, Wonderland Junior Season 2 and Came for You as a regular cast member. She also sang the song "勿听 (Don't Listen)" in the 2024 video game Black Myth: Wukong.

In 2025, she continues releasing more original soundtracks for popular dramas such as "芳华吟" for "国色芳华" and "锦月书" for "锦月如歌".

== Discography ==
=== Albums ===
Title	Album details	Sales
莫尔 MORE	Full release: March 28, 2021; Label: 智慧大狗×索尼音乐; Track listing: 1. "我想我不一样 (Fine Day)"; 2. "愉快纪念 (Anniversary)"; 3. "爱转 (Circle of Love)"; 4. "平行又交替 (feat. A-Lin) (Parallel Crossed)"; 5. "苏西的世界 (The Lovely Bones)"; 6. "你的情歌 (Your Song)"; 7. "深信不疑 (Belier)"; 8. "必需品 (Necessity)"; 9. "我们可能就这样 (Maybe it's the end)" 10. "其实也还好 (That's Alright)"; 11. "Blue Eyes"; 12. "波特兰灯塔 (Light House)"	190,680
Rec. X	Full Release: March 16, 2023; Label: 智慧大狗; Track listing: 1. "2 SiX"; 2. "Shalala"; 3. "请不要给我安全感 (Security)"; 4. "淡水河 (Freedom)"; 5. "万毒不侵 (The Poison)"; 6. "Flee. (with Liu Sijian)"; 7. "漂流 (The Floating)"; 8. "Ideal Type"; 9. "230am" 10. "余生有你 (Remaining)"	
镜·Kairos	First Song Release: June 12, 2025; Label: 讯飞音乐; Track listing: 1. "天上掉下个宁妹妹"	

=== Singles ===
Title	Year	Album
"妹之苍穹杀" (with Luo Zheng)	2018	你好学妹 original soundtrack
"我们"	2019	Rampage To The Next Stop original soundtrack
"萤火" (with Zhang Yihao)	2019	Legend Of The Phoenix original soundtrack
"虫儿飞" (Official Cover)	2019	Non-album single
"清平乐"	2019	The Longest Day In Chang'an promotional theme song
"自己"	2019	Rocket Girls 101 立风 (The Wind)
"云边"	2020	The Love Lasts Two Minds original soundtrack
"不爱而别"	2020	I've Fallen for You original soundtrack
"孤单北半球" (Official Cover)	2020	Non-album single
"不服"	2020	Cross Fire original soundtrack
"独家记忆" (Official Cover)	2020	Non-album single
"无罪说"	2020	Target Person original soundtrack
"你好，再见"	2020	To Love original soundtrack
"心里"	2021	Vacation Of Love original soundtrack
"对立面"	2021	The Blessed Girl original soundtrack
"Fight For Love"	2021	Game For Peace (game) original soundtrack
"戏春令"	2021	轩辕剑龙舞云山 (game) original soundtrack
"恋爱三分甜"	2021	Make My Heart Smile original soundtrack
"梦归尽"	2021	My Heroic Husband original soundtrack
"念未别"	2021	No Boundary original soundtrack
"I wanna see you now"	2021	Ugly Beauty original soundtrack
"月下"	2021	Truth or Dare original soundtrack
"After You 关于你"	2021	Silent Evidence original soundtrack
"你的名字"	2021	Non-album single
"最爱" (Official Cover)	2021	Non-album single
"连名带姓" (Official Cover)	2021	Non-album single
"落笔成殇"	2021	Beautiful Girl With Light Make-up original soundtrack
"化"	2021	Non-album single
"星星"	2021	The Flowers Are Blooming original soundtrack
"海风与晚星"	2022	Non-album single
"等风吻你"	2022	Binary Love original soundtrack
"叙事诗"	2022	Wife's Choice original soundtrack
"灰姑娘" (Official Cover)	2022	Non-album single
"所有浪漫关于你"	2022	Non-album single
"是否我真的一无所有"(Official Cover)	2022	Non-album single
"她觉得"	2022	Rose War original soundtrack
"黑白之间"	2022	Chasing The Undercurrent original soundtrack
"拥抱你的心跳"	2022	Beloved Life original soundtrack
"Be With Me"	2022	Mr. Bad original soundtrack
"以诗为名"	2022	Non-album single
"我想有个家"	2022	Wild Bloom original soundtrack
"让爱继续"	2022	Song Of The Moon original soundtrack
"流转"	2022	Non-album single
"讯号失灵"	2023	Non-album single
"蛋仔星派對"	2023	Eggy Party (game) original soundtrack
"失眠哲学"	2023	Non-album single
"船"	2023	Days Of Our Lives original soundtrack
"爱似流星" (Official Cover)	2023	Non-album single
"你值得最好的"	2023	Warm And Sweet original soundtrack
"我们的爱像夏天的风"	2023	Non-album single
"偏爱人间烟火" (with Hu Xia)	2023	Lost You Forever original soundtrack
"热爱"	2023	War of the Three Kingdoms (game) original soundtrack
"梦回姑苏"	2023	新天龙八部 (game) original soundtrack
"我会怎么样" (with Zhang Yuan)	2023	Incomparable Beauty original soundtrack
"念"	2024	The Journey Of Flower (2024) original soundtrack
"掌心"	2024	Non-album single
"花间语"	2024	In Blossom original soundtrack
"哥哥"	2024	War of Faith original soundtrack
"花火"	2024	The Expect Love original soundtrack
"问" (Official Cover)	2024	Non-album single
"探心"	2024	Follow Your Heart original soundtrack
"不见"	2024	Go East original soundtrack
"寻光"	2024	Hero Is Back original soundtrack
"勿听"	2024	Black Myth: Wukong (game) original soundtrack
"听"	2024	Black Myth: Wukong (game) original soundtrack
"Moonlight"	2024	Divorced Singles Season 6 original soundtrack
"梦诛缘.哪吒"	2024	Fantasy Zhu Xian (game) original soundtrack
"紫忆"	2024	Blossom original soundtrack
"鸣潮"	2024	Wuthering Waves (game) original soundtrack
"思念成风飘向你"	2024	Non-album single
"芳华吟"	2025	Flourished Peony original soundtrack
"尽献"	2025	Love of the Divine Tree original soundtrack
"木屿"	2025	The Embers original soundtrack
"拽姐"	2025	Filter original soundtrack
"做自己"	2025	Filter original soundtrack
"黯然"	2025	Si Jin original soundtrack
"我曾遇到一束光"	2025	Non-album single
"恋爱兄妹" (with Jiang Dunhao)	2025	My Sibling's Romance original soundtrack
"轻轻放下"	2025	Love Again original soundtrack
"朝晖映雪" (with Zhang Yuan)	2025	Destiny and Saving original soundtrack
"桃花灼热"	2025	天龙八手游 (game) original soundtrack
"风吹高山上"	2025	Non-album single
"精灵梦"	2025	精灵梦叶罗丽第11季 original soundtrack
"锦月书"	2025	Legend of The Female General original soundtrack
"未来伴侣"	2025	Non-album single
"看好！我大驾光临"	2025	下一顺位是她 original soundtrack
"薄幸"	2025	Yummy Yummy Yummy original soundtrack
"我很好"	2025	The Company original soundtrack
"我们没理由会不幸福"	2025	Non-album single
"一念"	2026	Pursuit of Jade (2026) original soundtrack
"没有心思想其他"	2026	Non-album single

== Filmography ==
=== Films ===
Year	English title	Chinese title	Role	Notes/Ref.
2024	The Journey of Flower (2024)	花千骨 (2024)	Qing Shui	

=== Dramas ===
Year	English title	Chinese title	Role	Notes/Ref.
2021	There's a Genie Next Door	隔壁有只桃花妖	Taohua / Mu Zhao	
2024	The Expect Love	夫君大人别怕我	Du Ruofei	

=== Television shows ===
Year	English title	Chinese title	Notes/Ref.
2018	Produce 101	创造101	Contestant, finished 7th
2018-2019	Rocket Girls 101 Research Institute	火箭少女研究所	Cast member
2019	Rampage to the Next Stop	横冲直撞20岁	Cast member
2020	Rampage to the Next Stop 2	横冲直撞20岁第2季	Cast member
2020	We Are Blazing	炙热的我们	Contestant
2023	Magical Musical Exercise Room	奇妙练歌房	Cast member
2023	Wonderland Junior Season 2	活力满分的夏天2	Cast member
2024	Came for You	音你而來	Cast member
