= Zhu Xudan =

Chinese actress (born 1992)

- Born: 15 April 1992 (age 34); Qiqihar, Heilongjiang
- Other name: Bambi Zhu
- Education: Central Academy of Drama
- Occupation: Actress
- Years active: 2013–present
- Agents: Hesong Entertainment (2026- ); Jay Walk Studio (2015-2025); Zhu Xudan Studio

Chinese name
- Simplified Chinese: 祝绪丹
- Traditional Chinese: 祝緒丹
Transcriptions
Standard Mandarin
- Hanyu Pinyin: Zhù Xùdān

Zhu Xudan (Chinese: 祝绪丹; born 15 April 1992), also known as Bambi Zhu, is a Chinese actress. She is best known for her supporting role in Eternal Love (2017) and her lead role as Zhou Zhiruo in Heavenly Sword and Dragon Slaying Sabre (2019). She is also known for her roles in Miss the Dragon (2021), Cute Programmer (2021), and Love Game in Eastern Fantasy (2024).

== Early life and education ==
Zhu Xudan was born 15 April 1992 in Qiqihar, Heilongjiang. Since the young age of 6, she started learning dance. Prior to debuting, she worked as an advertisement model. In 2010, Zhu was enrolled in the Central Academy of Drama majoring in performance arts. In 2012, she participated in the variety program Crazy For School Beauty, and was then signed on to Le.com as an artist for seven months.

== Career ==
=== 2013–2015: Acting debut ===
In 2013, Zhu made her first appearance in the CCTV legal program Wo Di Qian Chuan: Jie Mei. The same year, she appeared in the sitcom Wonder Lady, and also starred in the music short film Long Tan Dream. Zhu then appeared in a series of short web films.

In 2015, Zhu received her first major role in the web series The Ferryman 2; and also appeared in the historical war drama The Legend of Yongle Emperor, and period mystery drama A Detective Housewife.

=== 2017–present: Rising popularity ===
In 2017, Zhu played the antagonist in the fantasy romance drama Eternal Love. The series was a major hit and led to increased popularity for Zhu. The same year, she played her first leading role in the romantic campus web series Hi Flower; and also starred in the fantasy wuxia drama The Soul Stitcher.

In 2018, Zhu played supporting roles in the workplace drama Negotiator and romantic comedy drama Sweet Dreams. Both dramas attained high ratings when it aired on Hunan Television and led to increased recognition for Zhu.

In 2019, Zhu starred as one of the two female leads, Zhou Zhiruo in the wuxia drama Heavenly Sword and Dragon Slaying Sabre based on the novel of the same name by Jin Yong. Zhu received increased recognition after the drama aired.

Zhu is also set to star in the period romance drama Love in a Fallen City alongside Ethan Juan, and crime suspense drama Psych-Hunter alongside Hou Minghao.

== Filmography ==
=== Television series ===
Year	English title	Chinese title	Role	Network	Notes/Ref.
2013	Wo Di Qian Zhuan: Jie Mei	卧底前传之姐妹篇	Xiao Mei	CNTV	
2014	Wonder Lady 4	极品女士第四季		Sohu TV	bit part
2015	The Ferryman 2	灵魂摆渡2	Xiao Yu	iQIYI	
2016	A Detective Housewife	煮妇神探	Qiu Shui	Zhejiang TV	
2016	Chronicle of Life	寂寞空庭春欲晚	Rui Min	Zhejiang TV	
2016	The Legend of Yongle Emperor	英雄诀	Zhang Xixi	PPTV	
2016	Mr. Right	真命天子	Yang Muyun	Chongqing TV	
2017	Eternal Love	三生三世十里桃花	Xuan Nü	Dragon TV, Zhejiang TV	
2017	Hi Flower	囧女翻身之嗨如花	Lu Ruhua	Youku	
2017	The Soul Stitcher	画心师	Cen Huan	Sohu TV	
2018	Negotiator	谈判官	Shang Bichen	Hunan TV	
2018	Sweet Dreams	一千零一夜	Zhou Xinyan	Hunan TV	
2019	Heavenly Sword and Dragon Slaying Sabre	倚天屠龙记	Zhou Zhiruo	Tencent Video	
2020	Psych-Hunter	心宅猎人	Yuan Muqing	iQIYI	
2021	Miss the Dragon	遇龙	Liu Ying / Ruan A'yu / Feng Chenyue / Gu Qingyan	Tencent Video	
2021	Cute Programmer	程序员那么可爱	Lu Li	Tencent Video	
2024	Burning Flames	烈焰	A Lan	iQIYI	
2024	Fox Spirit Matchmaker: Red-Moon Pact	狐妖小红娘月红篇	Bu Tai	iQIYI	
2024	Fateful Love	流光引	Han Ziqing	Tencent Video	
2024	Love Game in Eastern Fantasy	永夜星河	Mu Yao	Tencent Video	
2025	Cao Xuanxuan's Love Journey	了不起的曹萱萱	Zhou Na / Cao Xuanxuan	Tencent Video	
2025	A Dream Within A Dream	书卷一梦	Song Yi Ting	iQIYI	

=== Short film ===
Year	English title	Chinese title	Role	Notes/Ref.
2014	Long Tan Dream	龙潭梦	Ling'er	
2014	The City of Lost Souls	晚安，陌生人	Her	
2015	Les Nuits del' Amour	爱神之夜	Zhu Zhu	
2015	Since I Have Been Loving You	同学会	Shi Haitian	
2015	Madan's Wet Dream	马旦儿的青春期	Xiao Xiao	
2015	Un Chained	会议终结者	Yao Xiaoxi	

=== Variety show ===
Year	English title	Chinese title	Role	Network	Notes/Ref.
2019	Everybody Stand By	演员请就位	Contestant	Tencent Video	

== Awards and nominations ==
Year	Event	Category	Nominated work	Result	Ref.
2018	Instyle Icon Awards	New Generation Idol Award	—N/a	Won	
2019	4th Golden Blossom Internet Film and Television Awards	Best Actress	Heavenly Sword and Dragon Slaying Sabre	Nominated	
2019	4th Golden Blossom Internet Film and Television Awards	Leaping Actress of the Year	Heavenly Sword and Dragon Slaying Sabre	Won	
2019	iFeng Fashion Choice Awards	Most Popular Female Celebrity	—N/a	Won	
2019	Tencent Video All Star Awards 2019	Promising TV Drama Performer of the Year	Heavenly Sword and Dragon Slaying Sabre	Won	
2020	Tencent Video All Star Awards 2020	Promising TV Drama Performer of the Year	—N/a	Won	
2023	9th Wenrong Awards	Top Ten Young Performer	—N/a	Won	
2025	Tencent Video All Star Awards 2024	Promising TV Drama Performer of the Year	Love Game in Eastern Fantasy	Won	
2025	Weibo Awards 2024	Breakthrough Performer of the Year	—N/a	Won	
