= Midsummer Is Full of Love =

2020 Chinese TV series

- Traditional Chinese: 仲夏滿天心
- Simplified Chinese: 仲夏满天心
- Hanyu Pinyin: Zhòngxià Mǎn Tiān Xīn
- Genre: Romance; Comedy; Drama
- Based on: Full House by Won Soo-yeon
- Written by: Xi Xiaoqin; Jian Bai; Li Lisha; Xin Xiaoyang
- Directed by: Zhang Lichuan
- Starring: Yang Chaoyue; Xu Weizhou
- Country of origin: China
- Original language: Mandarin
- No. of seasons: 1
- No. of episodes: 24

Production
- Producer: Zhao Jie
- Running time: 45 minutes
- Production companies: Tencent Penguin Pictures; Dreamax Media

Original release
- Network: Tencent Video
- Release: August 28 – September 7, 2020

Related
- Full House (South Korean original); Full House (Philippine remake); Full House Take 2 (South Korean sequel); Yeh Raha Dil (Pakistani remake)

Midsummer Is Full of Love (Chinese: 仲夏满天心; pinyin: Zhòngxià Mǎn Tiān Xīn, working title: Midsummer Is Full of Hearts) is a 2020 Chinese television series starring Yang Chaoyue and Xu Weizhou. The series is based on the Korean manhwa Full House written by Won Soo-yeon, and a remake of the 2004 South Korean drama Full House.

== Synopsis ==
The strong-willed amateur musician Luo Tianran met pop star Jin Zeyi by accident, only for them to clash as a result of personality differences.

== Cast ==
=== Main ===
Actor	Character	Introduction
Yang Chaoyue	Luo Tianran	A strong-willed and independent girl who is an amateur musician and dreams of being a composer. She meets Jin Zeyi by chance and enters a contract relationship with him.
Xu Weizhou	Jin Zeyi	A pop star who is cold on the outside but has hidden kindness.

=== Supporting ===
Actor	Character	Introduction
Shi Shi	Tiffany	Jin Zeyi's agent. She initially had feelings but Zeyi but later falls for Lin Che.
Li Jiaming	Yun Shu	A doctor and friend of Luo Tianran who has a crush on her.
Jiang Zixin	Jin Xiaoqin	Luo Tianran and Lin Che's friend.
Liu Miaolin	Lin Che	A good friend of Luo Tianran and Jin Xiaoqin, who is like a younger brother to them. He has a crush on Tiffany.
Zhong Qi	Meng Meng	A fashion designer who is Jin Zeyi's family friend and interested in him.
Zhou Liwei	Cheng Shasha	A cheerful and optimistic female artist that is under the same company as Jin Zeyi.
Zi Jian	A Tai	Jin Zeyi's assistant and bodyguard.
