= Doha Kang =

South Korean manhwa artist (born 1969)

- Hangul: 강성수
- RR: Gang Seongsu
- MR: Kang Sŏngsu

Pen name
- Hangul: 강도하
- RR: Gang Doha
- MR: Kang Toha

Doha Kang (Korean: 강도하; born 1969) is a South Korean manhwa artist. Kang wrote The Great Catsby and Romance Killer. Before 2005, when he presented The Great Catsby on Daum, one of the major Internet portals of South Korea, Kang signed his work with his birth name, Kang Seong-su. He is also the spouse of a famous manhwa artist, Won Soo-yeon, author of Full House, which was adapted into the television drama of the same name. Won is eight years older than Kang and they have two children.

In 1987 Kang won the Myeongrang Manhwa Artist Award for his work Father and Son (아버지와 아들) in the 4th New Manhwa Artist Award that was held by monthly magazine Bomulseom (Treasure Island)'s publishing company. At that time he still was a junior high school student. Although he began working as a manhwa artist immediately after graduation, he decided to become one when in the junior year of middle school, in 1983. For that reason, the last digits of his mobile phone number are 1983.

== Works ==
- The Great Catsby (2005)
- Romance Killer (2006)

== Awards ==
- 2001, Our Manhwa Award of Today
- 2004, Independent Best Art in the Year's Art Award
- 2005, Our Manhwa Award of Today
- 2005, Best Korean Manhwa, Korea Culture & Content Committee
- 2006, Best Readers' Award
