= Full House (Thai TV series) =

Thailand television drama series

- Thai: วุ่นนัก รักเต็มบ้าน
- Genre: Romance; Comedy; Drama
- Based on: Full House by Won Soo-yeon
- Written by: Jeab Wattana Weerayawattana
- Directed by: Saratswadee Wongsomphet
- Starring: Mike Angelo; Sushar Manaying
- Country of origin: Thailand
- Original language: Thai
- No. of episodes: 20

Production
- Producers: Ananda Everingham; Jeab Napassarin Prompila
- Running time: 60 minutes
- Production companies: Halo Productions Co., Ltd

Original release
- Network: True4U; TrueAsian HD
- Release: January 11 – March 16, 2014

Related
- Full House (2004)

Full House (Thai: วุ่นนัก รักเต็มบ้าน) is a 2014 Thai romantic comedy television series starring Mike Angelo and Sushar Manaying. It aired from January 11 to March 16, 2014, every Monday and Wednesday on True4U and TrueAsian HD. Directed by Saraswadi Wongsomphet, Full House is the fourth remake of the South Korean television drama hit with the same title that based on manhwa comics of Woon Soo-yeon.

== Cast ==
=== Main ===
- Mike Angelo as Mike/Thawin
  - Mac Nattapat Nimjirawat as younger Mike
- Sushar Manaying as Aom-am
- Uttsada Panichkul as Guy
  - Yorch Yongsin Wongpanitnont as younger Guy

=== Supporting ===
- Nest Nisachol Siwthaisong as Benz
  - Aheye Korranid Laosubinprasoet as younger Benz
- Deaw Chotpipat Suttijun as Pao
- Toh Varatta Vajrathon as T
- Janesuda Parnto as Mintra
- Charlette Wasita Hermenau as P

== Soundtrack ==
- "Oh Baby I" (ขับร้องโดย) by Mike Angelo feat Sushar Manaying
- "The Man Who Will Love You" (ให้ฉันได้เป็นผู้ชายที่จะรักเธอ) by Mike Angelo
