= Jae-hui =

- Hangul: 재희
- RR: Jaehui
- MR: Chaehŭi

Jae-hui or Jae-hee is a Korean given name.

People with this name include:

- Lee Jae-hee (born 1959), South Korean football player
- Chung Jae-hee (born 1979), South Korean badminton player
- Song Jae-hee (born 1979), South Korean actor
- Jae Hee (born 1980), South Korean actor
- Jeong Jae-hee (born 1994), South Korean football player

Fictional characters with this name include:

- Yoo Jae-hee, in 1995–2005 South Korean manhwa series Let Dai
- Han Jae-hee, in 2010 South Korean television series Athena: Goddess of War
- Goo Jae-hee, in 2012 South Korean television series To the Beautiful You
- Han Jae-hee, in 2012 South Korean television series The Innocent Man
- Lee Jae-hee, in 2013 South Korean television series When a Man Falls in Love
- Song Jae-hee, in 2014 South Korean television series Doctor Stranger
- Kwon Jae-hee, in 2015 South Korean television series A Girl Who Sees Smells
- Jaehee Kang, in 2016 South Korean mobile video game Mystic Messenger

== See also ==
- List of Korean given names
