= Winwin =

Chinese singer and actor (born 1997)

WinWin
- 董思成
- Winwin in 2019
- Born: Dǒng Sīchéng; October 28, 1997 (age 29); Wenzhou, Zhejiang, China
- Education: Beijing Dance Academy; Central Drama Academy
- Occupations: Singer; actor
- Years active: 2016–present
- Musical career
- Origin: South Korea
- Genres: K-pop; pop; Mandopop; C-Pop
- Instrument: Vocals
- Labels: SM; Avex Trax; Label V; Capitol Records; Yuekai Entertainment
- Formerly of: NCT; NCT 127; WayV; SM Town; SM Rookies

Dong Sicheng (Chinese: 董思成; pinyin: Dǒng Sīchéng; born October 28, 1997), known professionally as Winwin (Chinese: 昀昀; Korean: 윈윈), is a Chinese singer and actor. He is a former member of the South Korean boy band NCT and its subunit, WayV.

== Early life ==
Winwin was born on October 28, 1997, in Wenzhou, Zhejiang. He graduated in traditional Chinese dance from the Beijing Dance Academy and studied at the Central Drama Academy.

== Career ==
=== Pre-debut ===
Winwin was discovered by SM Entertainment, a South Korean entertainment agency, in 2013. After 2 years, he became a trainee in 2015. On January 5, 2016, he was introduced as a member of SM Rookies, a pre-debut training team composed of young trainees who will potentially debut as members of the idol group. On April 9, 2016, he appeared in the Korean and Chinese versions of NCT U debut music video, "Without You". In May of the same year, he also participated in the second season of the groups' variety show NCT Life.

=== 2016–present: Debut with NCT and solo activities ===
On July 7, 2016, Winwin made his debut as part of the South Korean group NCT 127 with their first EP NCT #127 and the title track "Fire truck". He debuted as part of the subunit NCT U with the title track "Boss" on February 8, 2018. The track was released as part of NCT's first solo album, NCT 2018 Empathy, where he also featured on the track "Black on Black" as part of NCT 2018. Winwin continued to promote with NCT 127 until the end of 2018. It was then announced that he would be on indefinite hiatus from group promotions to prepare for his debut in China.

Winwin made his Chinese debut as part of the sub-unit WayV on January 17, 2019, with the single "Regular" from their first album, The Vision. Winwin had also previously participated in the English and Korean versions of the song as part of NCT 127 the previous year.

In March 2019, he joined the cast of the Chinese variety show My Brilliant Masters. He participated in several other Chinese variety shows, such as Day Day Up and Happy Camp, as well as Korean variety shows, such as South Korean Foreigners.

On July 8, 2026, Winwin left SM Entertainment.

== Discography ==
=== Extended plays ===
List of extended plays, showing selected details, selected chart positions, sales figures, and certifications
Title	Details	Peak chart positions			Sales	Certifications
Title	Details	KOR	JPN	JPN Hot	Sales	Certifications
Re:Fresh	Scheduled: November 1, 2026; Label: TME (Tencent Music Entertainment Group); Formats: CD, digital download, streaming	To be released				

== Filmography ==
=== Television ===
Year	Title	Role	Ref.
2019	My Brilliant Masters (我们的师父)	Cast m ember	
2023	Sweet Games (25小时恋爱)	Yan Yue	
2024	Snowfall (冰雪谣)	Situ Weilian	
2025	Perfect Match	Yang Xian	
2025	Moonlit Reunion (子夜归)	Fu Zhao	
2026	A Splendid Match (良陈美锦)	Ye Xian	
2026	Sunshine Through the Rain	Chen Yanzhou	
TBA	Qia Feng Chun (恰逢春)	Xu Fengjia	
TBA	The Boundless Bright Moon (明月苍茫)	Mo Tihuai	
