= Full House (manhwa) =

South Korean manhwa series

- Cover of the Central Park Media edition of Full House vol. 1 (2004), art by Won Soo-yeon

풀하우스 RR: Pul hauseu MR: P'ul hausŭ
- Genre: Romantic comedy
- Author: Won Soo-yeon
- Publisher: (South Korea) Seoul Munhwasa
- English publisher: (United States) Central Park Media
- Volumes: 16

Full House (Korean: 풀하우스) is a manhwa series written and illustrated by Won Soo-yeon. It was later adapted into the 2004 Korean television drama of the same name.

Full House was also heavily featured in Twenty-Five Twenty-One. Following its appearance on the drama, Full House saw a sales growth of 1,044% in February 2022 (when the drama started airing) which was followed by a 24.3% sales increase in March 2022 compared to the previous month.

== Plot ==
Ellie lives in "Full House," the house that her architect father built before dying a few years ago. She loves the place, but one day people come to kick her out, claiming that the place now belongs to the famous British actor Ryder Bayer. Furious, she grabs her scripts that she has worked hard on writing, and wanders, trying to figure out why her house was taken. While walking across the street, she narrowly avoids being hit by a car, but the wheel does roll over her foot. And the owner of the car turns out to be none other than Ryder Bayer. As compensation for the accident, she asks for her house back, but he refuses, and they decide to enter a contract marriage and split the house between them. The manhwa is about their explosive marriage, and how they eventually fell in love with each other despite cataclysmic fights and dirty scandals.

== Characters ==
- Ellie Gee

Born to a Korean father and an English mother, Elle is an aspiring screenwriter. Her late father was an architect and built Full House before he died. The family home was the only thing left of her parents for Ellie, and to keep it she married Ryder. She is intelligent, abrasive, short, but also very kind, shy, and protective towards everyone but Ryder, who she sees as her enemy. Due to her lack of care about her appearance, she has a pimply face, for which Ryder calls her "ugly". In the Korean drama she is renamed as Han Ji-Eun, and is played by Song Hye Kyo.

- Ryder Bayer Lions

A British actor living in Ellie's house who is forced to marry her. Ryder's life as a superstar was rocked by rumors and scandals, the most recent one of him being gay and having an affair with his director. He vows not to fall in love due to a broken heart over his deceased child-hood friend and sister-in-law Jasmine. He is seen as a player, and he has a short temper and gets jealous easily. He is smooth and sweet, a heavy smoker, and aspires to be a better actor who gets more than princely roles just for his face. In the Korean drama he is renamed as Lee Young-Jae and is played by Korean Pop Singer Rain.

- Miranda Waverley

Ryder's manager. She is in love with Ryder, and believes that as long as she lets him play around he will return to her. She at first supports the marriage between Ellie and Ryder to get rid of some of the scandal, but tries to break them up because she sees Ryder falling in love with Ellie. She is smart and stylish, seen by many as "gorgeous", she does not see how Ryder could fall for someone like Ellie. She often ends up playing tricks on the two of them, such as stealing Ryder's wedding ring.

- Oswick Borde

Ryder's friend and fashion designer, he often cheers the couple on from a distance, and ends up consoling Miranda when she complains about how the couple's relationship continues to improve. Many of his styles become influenced by the couple, and he often uses his friend as models, joking about the money he saves by doing so.

- Angelo

Ryder's body guard, he is often perceived as being a big brute due to his hulking size, strength, and voice. But he is childlike, shy, and has never been in a relationship before, due to him devoting his entire life to his "Young Master", Ryder. He addresses everyone as "Miss" or "Mr", and always wears a suit and sunglasses even in summer or on vacation, saying he wants to look appropriate for his job. He was the one who originally kicked Ellie out of her house, though he does not remember. He is Ryder's secretary, and also does all of the cooking, cleaning, and driving for Ryder, refusing to let him hire a house keeper or cook since he'd rather be by Ryder's side. He falls in love with Ellie's best friend Christine, and roots for the couple more than anyone else.

- Christine

Ellie's best friend, she believes that the couple's relationship will fail. She makes a deal that she will visit Ellie's and Ryder's house in two years, but then says that by then the divorce would be over with. She helps with her family's restaurant, but does not know what she wants to do with her life other than that.

- Felix

Ellie's ex-boyfriend and childhood friend, he breaks up with her because she refuses to kiss him, though he does not realize it is because she has painful cavities. He attempts reuniting with her when he finds out, but he learns of her engagement to Ryder. He still holds out hope, but eventually loses it when he figures out Ellie loves Ryder. He is sweet, a bit naive, and obsessed with Ellie. After they break up for good, whenever he gets together with a woman romantically he calls her Ellie, and often gets hit.

- Candy Lions

Ryder's grandmother, she is the only family member who supports his marriage to Ellie, and says she likes her. When sick she is taken care of by Ellie, and learns to play cards from her.

- Lenny Lions

Ryder's elder brother and head of the family. He disapproves of Ryder's career and his sudden marriage, especially to a foreigner, since she may weaken the Lions bloodline. He was married to Ryder's childhood love Jasmine, and after her death became strict and intolerant.

- Lisa Lions

Ryder's younger sister, she is used to being spoiled by her brother so she resents Ellie taking him away from her. She often plots with her friend Susan to break them up, and hates Ellie even more for "stealing her grandmother". She rebels by not coming and visiting her family in the hospital, hanging out with delinquents, and smoking, and is more worried about what her brother thinks of her than if anyone gets hurt.

- Henry

The bad guy. He got Full House off of Ellie's father in a fixed bet, and then sold it to Ryder. When Ellie tries to find out what happened, he tries to kill her. He is a psychopath, and has many illegal holdings around the country.

- Damon Price

A publisher and heir to a vast media network. He falls in love with Ellie, and thinks if he confesses enough and truthfully, she will accept his feelings. He is also Ellie's boss when she begins writing a column for his magazine.

- Jim Leonard

A director, he dislikes Ryder as a person and belittles his career, though he believes he is a good actor. He becomes friends with Ellie, and directs her first script.

== Adaptations ==
=== TV dramas ===
Year	Title	Country	Actors	Notes
2004	Full House	South Korea	Rain, Song Hye Kyo, Han Eun-Jung, Kim Sung-Soo	
2009	Full House	Philippines	Richard Gutierrez, Heart Evangelista	
2009	Ngôi nhà hạnh phúc	Vietnam	Lương Mạnh Hải, Minh Hằng	
2012	Full House Take 2	South Korea	Hwang Jung-eum, No Min-woo, Park Ki-woong	Sequel
2014	วุ่นนัก รักเต็มบ้าน	Thailand	Mike D. Angelo, Sucharat Manaying	
2014	Full House	Cambodia	Heng Norakakada, Huy Chan Reachny	
2015	İlişki Durumu: Karışık	Turkey	Berk Oktay, Seren Şirince	
2017	Yeh Raha Dil	Pakistan	Ahmed Ali Akbar, Yumna Zaidi	
2020	Midsummer Is Full of Love	China	Yang Chaoyue, Xu Weizhou	
