= Sunshine Through the Rain =

2026 Chinese television series

- Also known as
- Traditional Chinese: 今天是太陽雨
- Simplified Chinese: 今天是太阳雨
- Hanyu Pinyin: Jīntiān shì tài yáng yǔ
- Genre: Romance; Youth; Drama
- Written by: Shi Ye
- Directed by: Mao Deshu (Cattree) [zh]
- Starring: Yang Chaoyue; Dong Sicheng
- Country of origin: China
- Original language: Mandarin
- No. of seasons: 1
- No. of episodes: 24

Production
- Running time: 45–58 minutes
- Production company: Linmon Media

Original release
- Network: Mango TV; Netflix; Hunan Television
- Release: November 6 – November 17, 2026

Sunshine Through the Rain (Chinese: 今天是太阳雨) is a 2026 Chinese television series starring Yang Chaoyue and Dong Sicheng in leading roles. The series premiered on Mango TV and Netflix on November 6, 2026. It began airing on Hunan TV on November 11, 2026.

The series is directed by Mao Deshu, who is well-known for romance series such as When I Fly Towards You.

== Synopsis ==
Zheng Yu, a top biology student, is struggling with family debt and survives on scholarships and part-time jobs. Chen Yanzhou, a senior who took a leave of absence due to illness, becomes her fiercest academic rival as they battle for the same scholarship. But through repeated clashes and collaborations, the two discover they share the same kind of family trauma - he is moved by her resilience, and she comes to understand his scars. Rivals turn into allies, then into something closer, as they win a competition together, open up about the burdens they've each carried alone, and help each other find a way forward.

== Cast and characters ==
=== Main ===
- Yang Chaoyue as Zheng Yu

A junior biology major who is quiet, fiercely independent, and somewhat guarded. Forced to grow up fast after losing her father, with her mother in a vegetative state. Struggling to make ends meet, she juggles multiple part-time jobs, grants, and a fierce bid for a scholarship to stay in school and support her family on her own.

- Dong Sicheng/WinWin as Chen Yanzhou

A wealthy yet deeply isolated junior biology major whose aloof exterior hides a warm heart. Shattered by his older brother's sudden death, he enrolled in the biology program to carry on his brother's legacy. Returning from a one-year myocarditis medical leave, this top-ranking student becomes Zheng Yu's classmate and her biggest rival for the scholarship. Once driven solely by grief and his brother's memory, he gradually learns to live for himself after meeting Zheng Yu.

== Broadcast ==
The series premiered on November 6, 2026. As an original series, it generated relatively little buzz before its premiere. However, according to Maoyan, online views exceeded 10 million on its premiere day, and then surpassed 110 million within 24 hours, topping several rankings on Weibo and Douyin.

Platform	Region	Premiere date	Notes
Mango TV	China	November 6, 2026	12:00 (UTC+8)
Netflix	International	November 6, 2026	
Mango TV International	International	November 6, 2026	
Hunan Television	China	November 11, 2026	

=== Episode List ===
EP	Broadcast date	Title	Chinese Title	Runtime (Min)
1	2026/11/06	Off the Curve	第一名的偏差值 lit. 'T-score of first place'	46
2	2026/11/06	The Driven	早起的鸟儿们 lit. 'The early birds'	52
3	2026/11/06	Points of Reference	参照物 同路人 lit. 'Reference point; Fellow travelers'	51
4	2026/11/07	Someone in Yesterday	有人住在昨天 lit. 'Someone in Yesterday'	52
5	2026/11/07	What You Never Knew	你不知道的事 lit. 'What You Never Knew'	45
6	2026/11/07	Two Under the Mountain	背着五指山的人有两个	46
7	2026/11/08	The Unspoken	不能说的秘密 lit. 'The Secret That Cannot Be Told'	45
8	2026/11/08	Beauty Isn't Far Away	漂亮的地方不一定很远 lit. 'Beauty Isn't Far Away'	56
9	2026/11/09	The Rainy Season	雨 季 lit. 'The Rainy Season'	50
10	2026/11/10	Almost Friends	算得上是朋友 lit. 'Almost Friends'	46
11	2026/11/10	A Little Closer	再走近一点 lit. 'Get a little closer'	58
12	2026/11/11	Here's to the Future	敬未来 lit. 'Here's to the Future'	54
13	2026/11/11	The Ache of Loving	悲伤是因为爱	47
14	2026/11/12	Jealousy	被打翻的醋坛	45
15	2026/11/12	The Space Between Us	这么近 那么远	46
16	2026/11/13	The Greatest Distance	世界上最遥远的距离	47
17	2026/11/14	Until We Meet Again	直到和过去重逢	45
18	2026/11/15	Impossible to Ignore	无法忽视的喜欢	45
19	2026/11/15	Rooting for You	我会在远方为你加油	45
20	2026/11/16	There You Are	好久不见	44
21	2026/11/17	First Love	初恋	49
22	2026/11/17	Simply Irresistible	实在令人心动	45
23	2026/11/17	In Sync	同频共振的我们	48
24	2026/11/17	After the Sunshower	太阳雨之后	54
