= Full House (Philippine TV series) =

Philippine television drama series

- Title card
- Genre: Drama; Romantic comedy
- Based on: Full House by Won Soo-yeon
- Developed by: Denoy Navarro-Punio
- Directed by: Mark A. Reyes V
- Starring: Richard Gutierrez; Heart Evangelista
- Theme music composer: Arnold Buena; Janno Gibbs
- Opening theme: "Fallin'" by Janno Gibbs
- Ending theme: "I Haven't Stopped Loving You" by Janno Gibbs
- Country of origin: Philippines
- Original language: Tagalog
- No. of episodes: 65

Production
- Executive producer: Angie C. Castrence
- Production locations: Mexico, Pampanga; Prague, Czech Republic
- Camera setup: Multiple-camera setup
- Running time: 30–45 minutes
- Production company: GMA Entertainment TV

Original release
- Network: GMA Network
- Release: November 30, 2009 – February 26, 2010

Related
- Full House (2004)

Full House is a Philippine television drama romantic comedy series broadcast by GMA Network. The series is based on a manhwa series of the same title by Won Soo-yeon. Directed by Mark A. Reyes V, it stars Richard Gutierrez and Heart Evangelista. It premiered on November 30, 2009, on the network's Telebabad line up. The series concluded on February 26, 2010, with a total of 65 episodes.

The series is streaming online on YouTube.

== Cast and characters ==
Cast

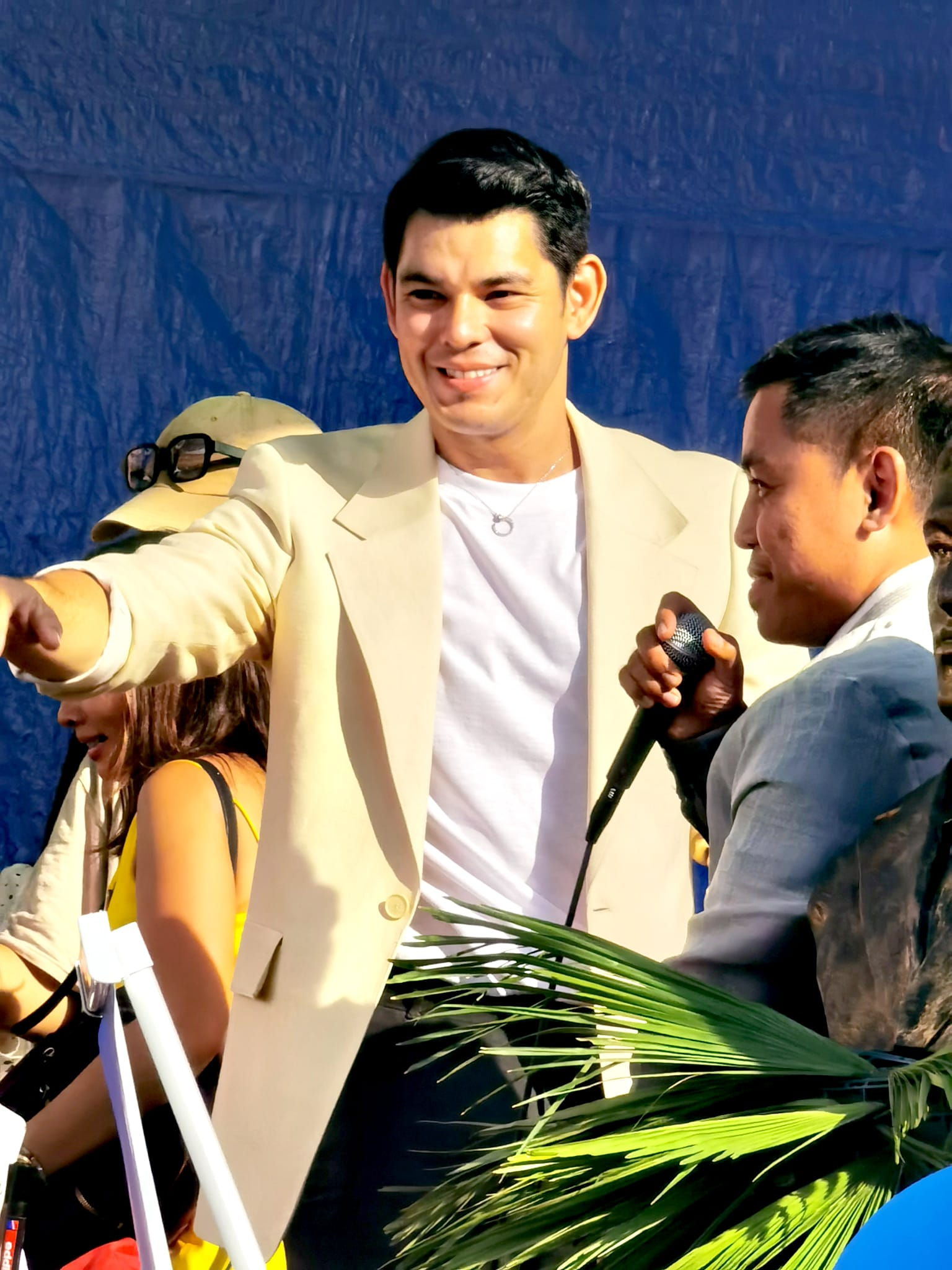
Richard Gutierrez

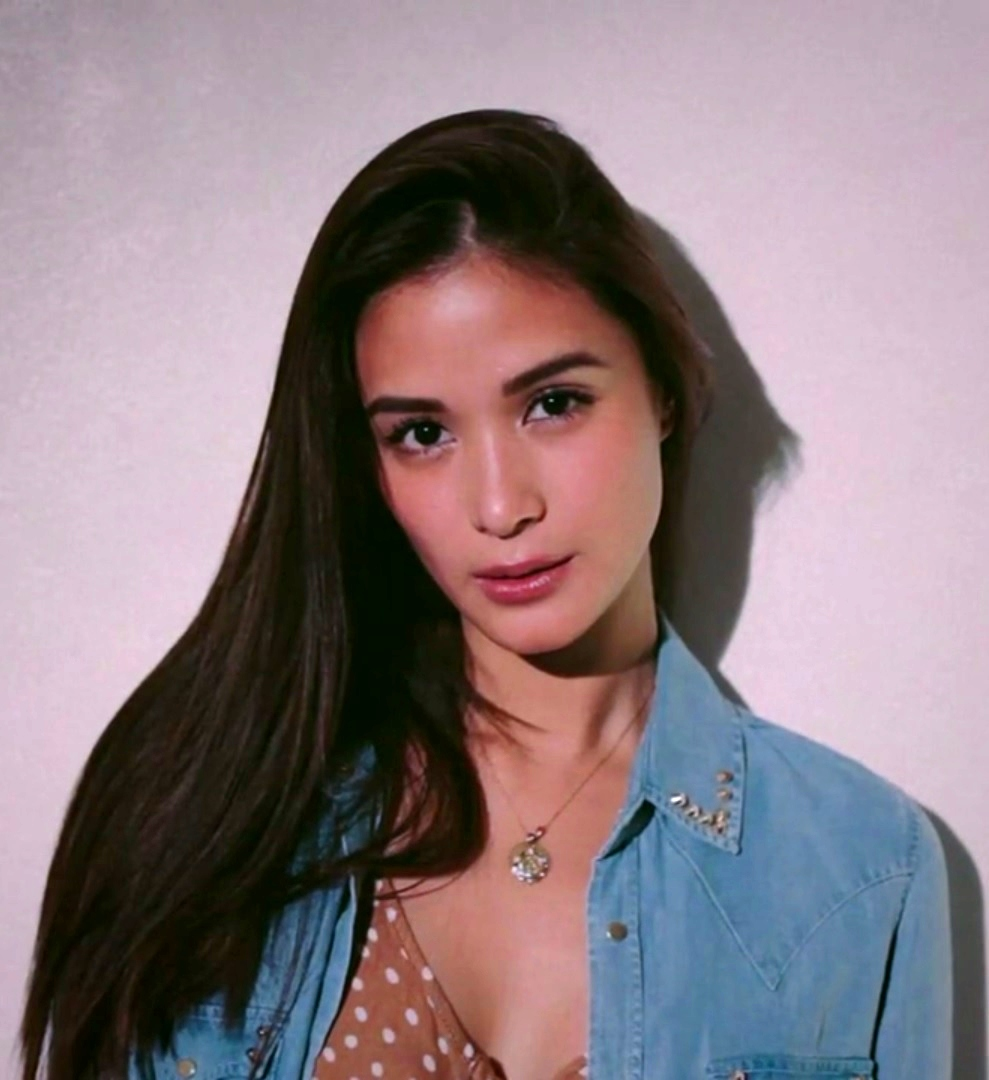
Heart Evangelista

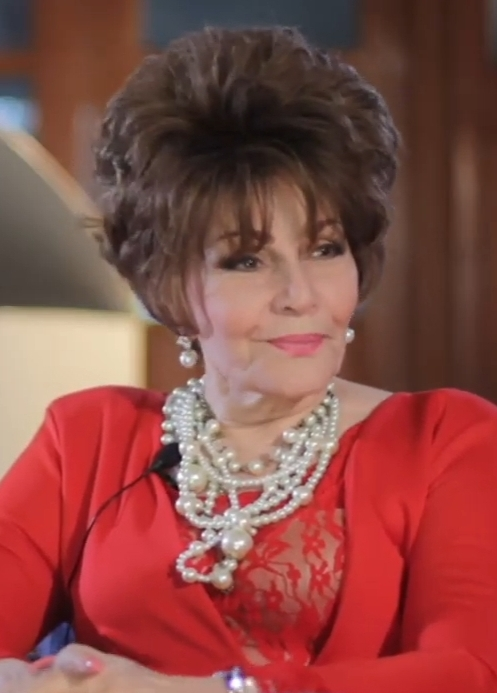
Pilita Corrales

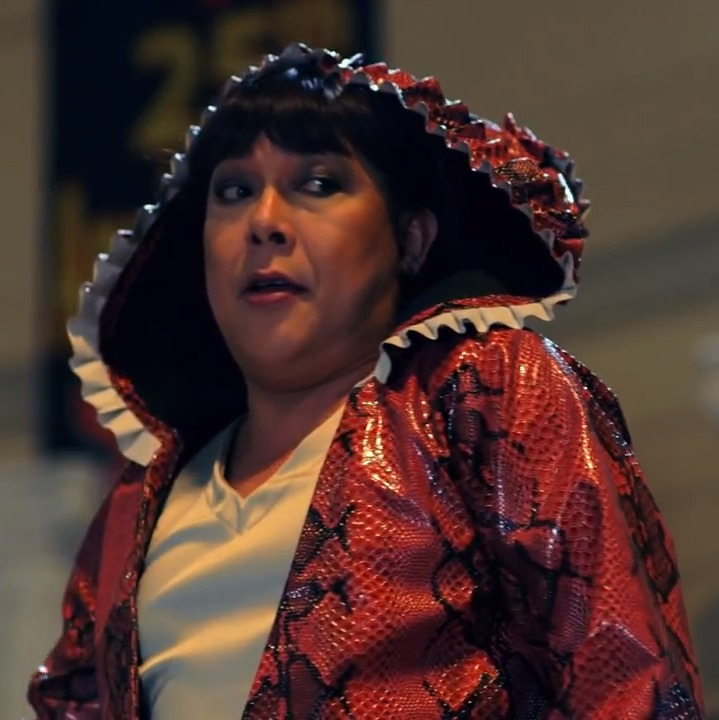
John Lapus

Lead cast

- Richard Gutierrez as Justin Lazatin
- Heart Evangelista as Maria Jesusa "Jessie" Asuncion-Lazatin

Supporting cast

- Isabel Oli as Elaine Villavicencio
- Patrick Garcia as Luigi Mondragon
- Pilita Corrales as Anita Lazatin
- Ronaldo Valdez as Lorenzo Lazatin
- Raquel Villavicencio as Liling Lazatin
- Sheena Halili as Lisette Montemayor-Asuncion
- Rainier Castillo as Donald Asuncion
- Keempee de Leon as H
- Epy Quizon as Jerry
- John Lapus as Chicky
- Marky Lopez as Marlon
- Chariz Solomon as Maya

== Development ==
Full House is a South Korean manhwa series, written by Won Soo-yeon. It was later adapted in South Korea as a television series. The television series was broadcast in the Philippines through GMA Network.

== Production ==
Principal photography commenced in October 2009. Filming took place in Mexico, Pampanga and Prague, Czech Republic.

== Ratings ==
According to AGB Nielsen Philippines' Mega Manila household television ratings, the pilot episode of Full House earned a 24.5% rating. The final episode scored a 29.8% rating.
