= The Great Catsby =

South Korean webtoon by Doha Kang and Kim Seung-jin

- Second volume of The Great Catsby series

위대한 캣츠비 Widaehan Kaetcheubi
- Genre: Romantic comedy; Anthropomorphic
- Author: Doha Kang, Kim Seung-jin
- Publisher: Empas, Daum
- English publisher: Netcomics
- Original run: 2004
- Volumes: 6

The Great Catsby (Korean: 위대한 캣츠비) is a South Korean webtoon written by Doha Kang and Kim Seung-jin. It was first serialized on Empas at 2004, but discontinued in 2005. The title is a play on the classic novel by F. Scott Fitzgerald, The Great Gatsby.

Daum also published the comic. Netcomics, which holds the translation publication rights, published the comic in six volumes and on the internet in English.

The comic starts by introducing Catsby, a university graduate who is depressed for not being able to find a job. His girlfriend, Persu, announces that she will marry another man — one that is significantly older and richer than Catsby.

== Characters ==
From left to right: Houndu, Persu, Burudog, Catsby, Sun.

Catsby (캣츠비; Kaetcheubi; K'aetch'ŭbi): The main character of the series. He is usually carefree, but is often depressed, and sometimes prone to panicking.

Houndu (하운두; Haundu; Hauntu; lit. 'hound'): Catsby's roommate and good friend. He provides financial sustenance for Catsby, working as a private tutor, sometimes known for philandering with female clients. He often brings Catsby to karaoke bars to help him feel better.

Persu (페르수; Pereusu; P'erŭsu): Catsby's long-running girlfriend who leaves him to marry another man. After becoming disappointed with her marriage, she begins stalking Catbsy after he starts dating Sun, even going so far as to confront him and demand that he come back to her.

Sun (선; Seon; Sŏn): After being rated a "C" by a matchmaking/dating service, Catsby is paired with Sun, who also was rated a C. Both she and Catbsy begin to become extremely attached as the series progresses. Almost constantly shows extreme optimism, even to the most simple things, and playful to an almost childlike extent.

Brudog (부르독; Bureudok; lit. 'bulldog'): A character who makes an appearance in the first volume as Persu's husband. His demeanor is extremely stoic, almost to the point of hostility, but as the story progresses, he is revealed to be a much more gentle, though emotionally plagued, individual.

== Adaptations ==
- A 24-episode live-action TV drama based on the series was produced by May Queen Pictures (formerly Midas Pictures) for tvN, starring Korean singer MC Mong and was broadcast in 2007.
- In 2007 a musical based on the series appeared in South Korea.
- In 2010, the development of an animated movie by GK Entertainment, directed by Gisaburō Sugii, was announced. No further information has been announced.

== Reviews ==
Publishers Weekly concluded that it was "an honest delineation of the anxiety of youth wrapped in the innocent style of anthropomorphic animals." The publication stated that the translation is "sometimes awkward".
