= Yang Chaoyue =

Chinese singer and actress (born 1998)

- 杨超越
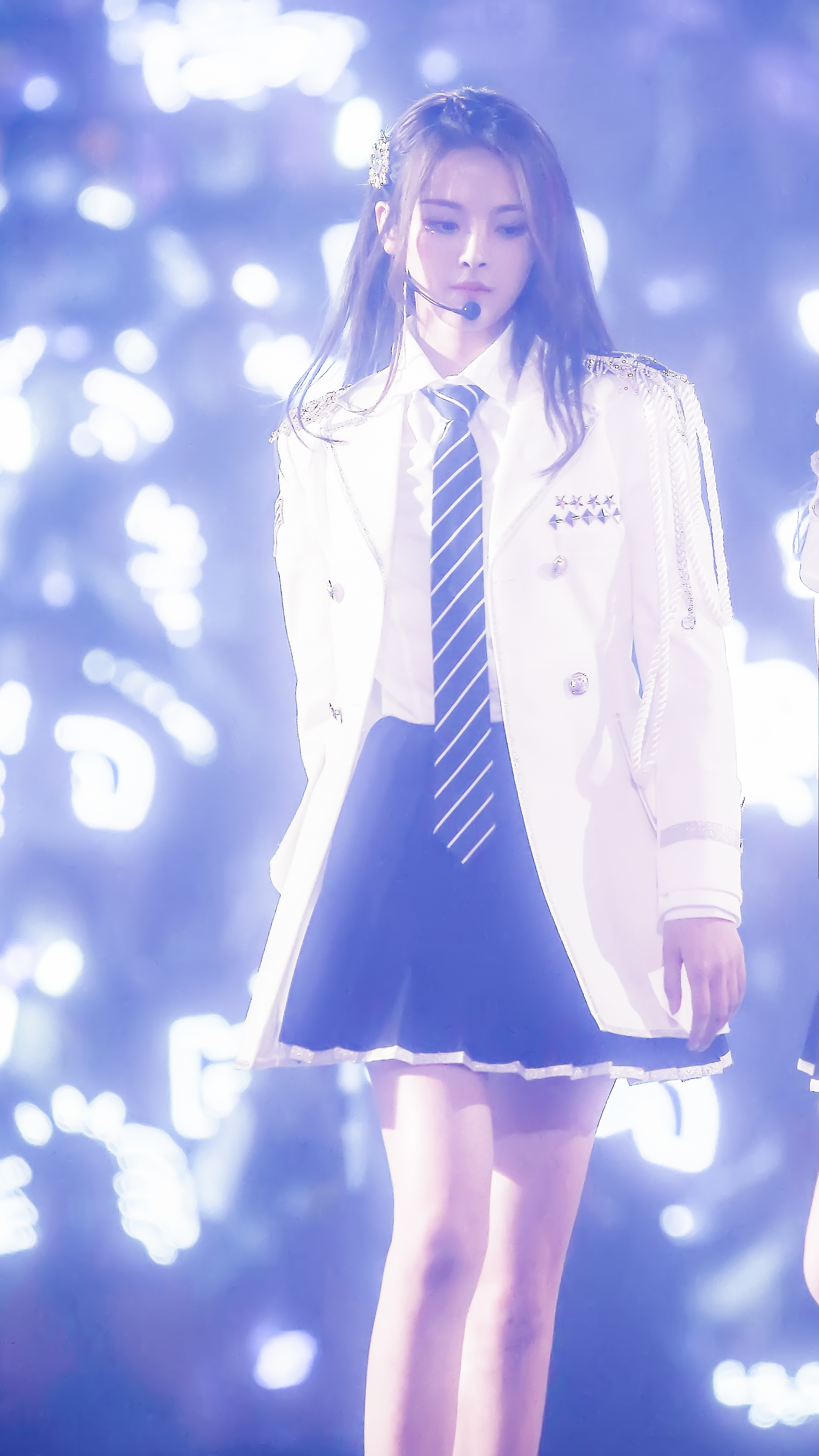
- Yang in 2019
- Born: July 31, 1998 (age 28); Dafeng, Yancheng, Jiangsu, China
- Other names: 村花 (village flower); 超超越越 (ccyy)
- Occupations: Singer; Actress
- Musical career
- Genres: Mandopop; Dance-pop
- Instrument: Vocals
- Years active: 2017–present
- Formerly of: Rocket Girls 101

Chinese name
- Traditional Chinese: 楊超越
- Simplified Chinese: 杨超越
Transcriptions
Standard Mandarin
- Hanyu Pinyin: Yáng Chāoyuè

Yang Chaoyue (Chinese: 杨超越, born July 31, 1998) is a Chinese actress and singer. After finishing third in Tencent's girl group survival show Produce 101, she debuted as a member of Rocket Girls 101. She was named by China Newsweek as one of the most influential Chinese people in 2018.

== Early life ==
Yang was born on July 31, 1998, in a village in Dafeng, Yancheng, Jiangsu, China. She is of Bai ethnicity. Her parents divorced when she was twelve. Instead of going to high school, she decided to help support her family and left home to work. She had various job experiences such as waitress, garment worker, flyer distributor, prior to becoming an idol.

== Career ==
=== 2016–2017: Girl group contest and CH2 ===
In 2016, the eSports game Battle of Balls hosted a girl group contest offering a 2000 RMB salary with accommodation and meals. Yang was voted to be the most popular contestant during the contest and began her idol trainee career along with ten other contestants. In 2017, eight of the trainees formed the girl group CH2. Due to Wenlan Culture's video game industry background and the lack of a dedicated performance theater, Yang did not receive proper training; instead, her jobs were mostly involved in promoting video games at various events.

=== 2018–present: Produce 101, Rocket Girls 101 and acting debut ===
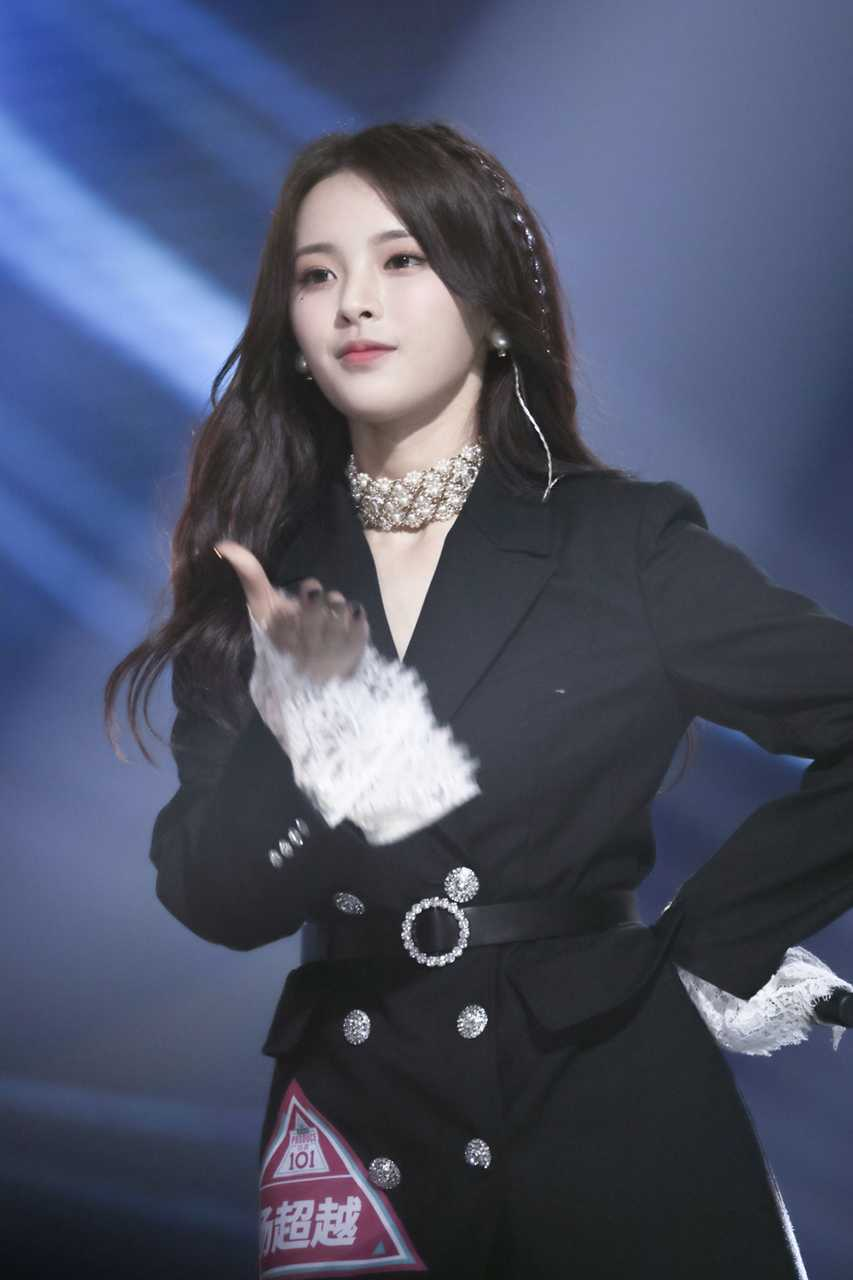
Yang Chaoyue during Produce 101 final

In April, Yang Chaoyue and three of her CH2 teammates were chosen to represent Wenlan Culture on reality girl group survival show Produce 101 aired from April 21 to June 23, 2018, on Tencent Video. During her time on the show, Yang was the subject of intense online debate due to a perceived lack of singing and dancing ability. Despite a poor performance during the evaluation stage, when the first episode aired, Yang soon gained popularity for her "rags-to-riches backstory, doll-like looks, [and] sweet-mannered personality", and was voted by fans into A-class. This resulted in debate and put her on multiple Weibo trending topics. Yang was subjected to hateful internet comments that degraded her stage performances and her personality, leading to debate on cyberbullying. Some netizens anonymously reported Yang to the Ministry of Culture, claiming that she did not have any singing or dancing talent and that allowing her to debut in Rocket Girls 101 "violated the Core Socialist Values". Wang Sicong, son of tycoon Wang Jianlin, also criticised Yang and made her a trending topic on Weibo once again. Despite debate, Yang remained one of the most popular contestants throughout the course of the show, never ranking outside the top 9. She ultimately finished third with over 139 million votes and debuted as a member of Rocket Girls 101 on June 23. In response to critics, Yang stated "I can't do anything well. I am [only] good at arguing with my boss … But God doesn't just like clever people. He blesses stupid children like us, too. So don't give up on yourself [even if] you are mediocre and stupid".

While promoting with Rocket Girls 101, Yang also pursued solo activities. In September 2018, she released her first solo song, a promotional single, titled Follow Me. In November, Yang was announced to make her acting debut in the historical drama The Promise of Chang'an. Also in 2018, Yang was cast as a panelist in the first season of the dating reality show Heart Signal, an adaptation of the South Korean reality show of the same name. In March 2019, she appeared in the 2019 FIBA Basketball World Cup draw ceremony as a special guest and World Cup draw ambassador. The same year she played her first leading role in the youth sports drama Project 17: Side by Side. As Yang had never been formally trained as an actor, the casting placed Yang's acting skills under scrutiny, with director Chiang Hsiu-chiung reporting that the pressure drove Yang to tears multiple times during filming. In evaluating her performance, Chiang praised Yang for her hard work and motivation to improve. Also in 2019, Yang returned for the second season of Heart Signal. Yang was later ranked 58th in the Forbes China Celebrity 100 list for 2019. Forbes China listed Yang under their 30 Under 30 Asia 2019 list which consisted of 30 influential people under 30 years old who have had a substantial effect in their fields.

After Rocket Girls 101 disbanded on June 23, 2020, Yang chose to focus on pursuing acting and variety shows. In 2020, Yang starred in the fantasy historical web series Ever Night playing Hao Tian/Tian Nu. She then played lead roles in xianxia romance drama Dance of the Phoenix and romantic comedy-drama Midsummer Is Full of Love. Yang's transition to leading roles attracted mixed reviews, with praise focused on her natural charm as an actor and criticism focused on her ability to portray more dramatic scenes. In addition to acting, Yang was a main cast member in multiple variety shows, including When We Write Love Story, The Great Wall, and the third season of Heart Signal. She ranked 80th on Forbes China Celebrity 100 list.

In 2021, Yang played a supporting role in the iQiyi drama series The Ideal City. With The Ideal City, Yang willingly took a step away from leading roles in order to further hone her acting skills and work alongside experienced actors such as Sun Li and Mark Chao. In 2022, she starred in the wuxia drama Heroes and the family sitcom Sisterhood. In 2023, Yang starred in the xianxia romance Love You Seven Times alongside Ding Yuxi. Though she continued to receive criticism for her dramatic acting, Yang was praised for the improvements she had made as a leading actor. However the drama underperformed relative to expectations, and was considered a commercial flop. Also in 2023, Yang starred in the xianxia romance The Journey of Chong Zi, and made guest appearances in the dramas Fireworks of my Heart, Never Give Up, and Gone with the Rain.

2024 was a breakthrough year for Yang. In January, Yang starred in the family drama Born to Run as Chen Ruoha, an unloved daughter who becomes the sole object of her controlling mother's affections after the sudden death of her brother. The show was a ratings success for CCTV-8, with many viewers finding Yang's performance sympathetic and relatable. In June, Yang made a guest appearance in the historical romance drama The Double as Jiang Li. The drama was a hit, becoming the most-watched drama on Youku that year. Though her appearance was brief, Yang received widespread praise for her role, prompting renewed interest in her career. Also in 2024, Yang made her theatrical debut with the play The Insanity, where she received positive reception for her performance. That same year, Yang released her debut EP Authentic, which she also co-wrote, with lyrics reflecting on her struggles as an artist and her journey of self-growth.

== Discography ==
=== Extended plays ===
Title	Album details
Authentic (透明)	Released: November 29, 2024; Label: Tencent Music Entertainment Group; Formats: Digital download, streaming; Track listing: 1. 正在输入; 2. 透明; 3. 对焦浪漫 (feat. Justin Huang)

=== Singles ===
Title	Year	Peak chart positions	Album
Title	Year	CHN (Note: The Billboard China Top 100 was launched in January 2019 by Billboard China.)	Album
"跟着我一起 (Follow Me)"	2018	—	Nin Jiom Herbal Cough Syrup Promo single
"冲鸭冲鸭 (March On and On)"	2018	—	光明勇士 (Legend of Honour) Game promo single
"招财进宝 (Lucky Fortune)"	2018	93	Kung Fu Monster Holiday Promo single
"哈哈农夫 (Haha Farmer)" (with Wang Yuan, Jia Nailiang, Jin Hao)	2019	57	Haha Farmer Theme song
"O.O"	2019	—	The Wind
"Never Stand Still"	2019	—	Project 17 promotional song
"—" denotes releases that did not chart or were not released in that region.

== Filmography ==
=== Film ===
Year	English title	Chinese title	Role	Ref.
2021	Our New Life	我们的新生活	Chen Jing Yu	
2026	Being Toward Death	10间敢死队	Xie Xie	

=== Television series ===
Year	English title	Chinese title	Role	Ref.
2019	Project 17: Side by Side	极限17 羽你同行	Xiao Na	
2020	Ever Night 2	将夜2	Hao Tian / Tian Nu	
2020	Dance of the Phoenix	且听凤鸣	Feng Wu	
2020	Midsummer Is Full of Love	仲夏满天心	Luo Tianran	
2020	The Promise of Chang'an	长安诺	Dong Ruoxuan	
2021	The Ideal City	理想之城	Du Juan	
2022	Heroes	说英雄谁是英雄	Wen Rou	
2022	Sisterhood	家有姐妹	Fang Xiang	
2023	The Journey of Chong Zi	重紫	Chong Zi	
2023	Love You Seven Times	七時吉祥	Xiang Yun	
2023	Fireworks of My Heart	我的人间烟火	Zhai Miao	
2023	Never Give Up	今日宜加油	Wu Yimei	
2023	Gone with the Rain	微雨燕双飞	Empress Dowager (young)	
2024	Born to Run	如果奔跑是我的人生	Chen Ruohua	
2024	The Double	墨雨云间	Jiang Li	
2026	King of Comedy	喜剧之王	A Zhen	
2026	Sunshine Through the Rain	今天是太阳雨	Zheng Yu	

=== Television show ===
Year	English title	Chinese title	Network	Notes	Ref.
2018	Produce 101	创造101	Tencent Video	Contestant; 3rd place	
2018	Heart Signal	心动的信号	Tencent Video	Panelist	
2019	Haha Farmer	哈哈农夫	Mango TV; Hunan Television	Cast member	
2019	Heart Signal 2	心动的信号2	Tencent Video	Panelist	
2020	The Great Wall	了不起的长城	Beijing TV	Cast member	
2020	Heart Signal 3	心动的信号3	Tencent Video	Panelist	
2020	When We Write Love Story	平行时空遇见你	Tencent Video	Cast member	
2020	Wonder Agency	神奇公司在哪里	Dragon Television; Tencent Video	Host	
2021	Go Fighting! Treasure Tour 2	极限挑战宝藏行·绿水青山公益季	Dragon Television	Cast member	
2022	Onair Sitcom	开播！情景喜剧 第一季	Dragon Television; Tencent Video; Youku	Cast member	
2022	Go Fighting! Season 8	极限挑战第八季	Dragon Television	Cast member	
2022	The Oasis	登录圆鱼洲	Tencent Video	Cast member	
2023	Warrior Girls	漂亮的战斗	iQIYI	Cast member	
2023	Super Smart	超机智青年大会	Youku	Host	
2024	Random Journey on the Way	盲盒旅行局	Youku	Cast member	
2025	We Are the Champions 4	战至巅峰 第四季	Tencent Video	Cast member	

== Awards and nominations ==
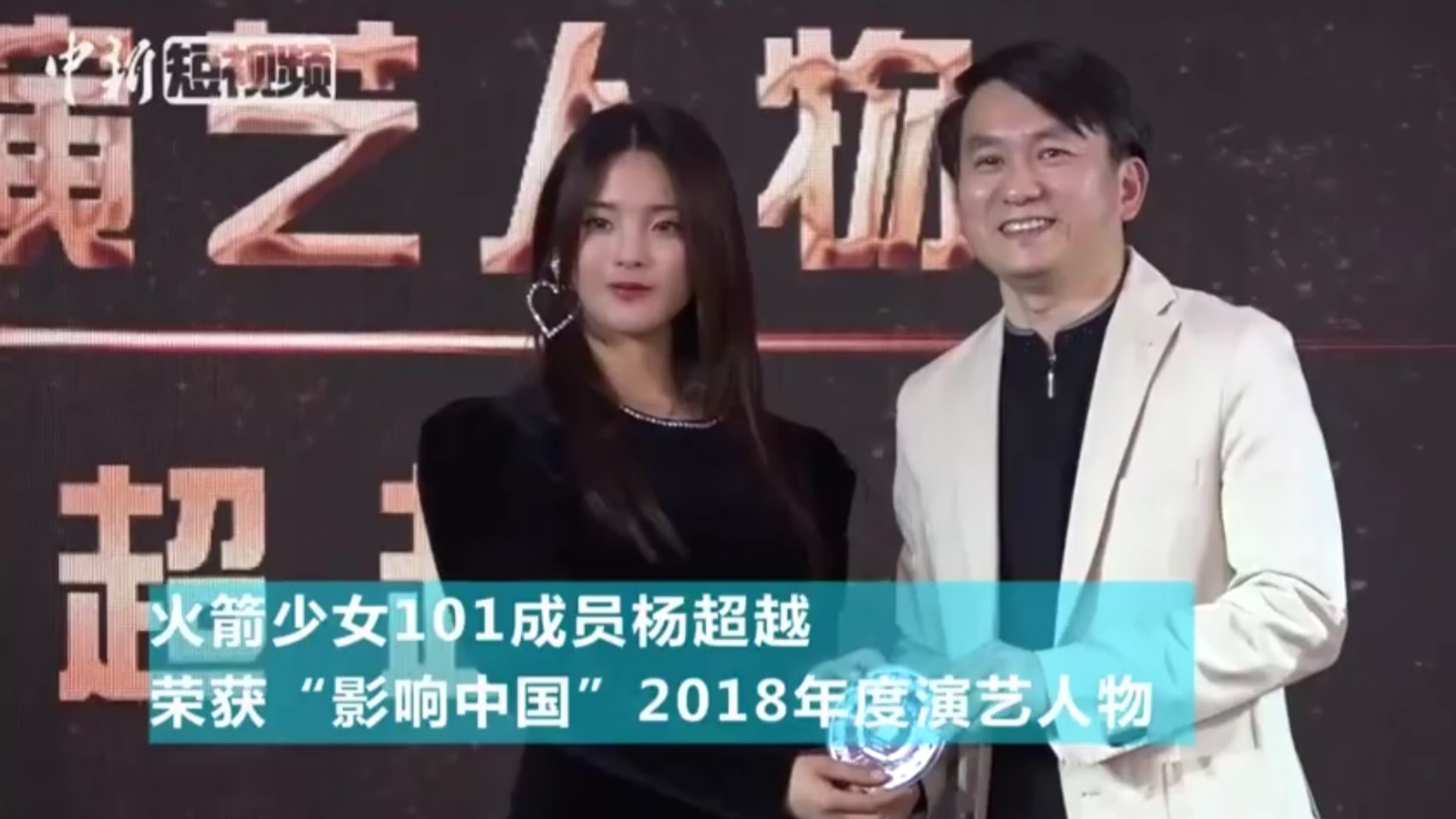
Yang awarded Artist of the Year by China Newsweek China's Most Influential, 2018

Name of the award ceremony, year presented, category, nominee of the award, and the result of the nomination
Award ceremony	Year	Category	Nominee / Work	Result	Ref.
China Newsweek China's Most Influential	2018	Artist of the Year	Herself	Won	
SMG TV Series Quality Awards	2023	Media Popularity Award	The Ideal City	Won	
Golden Bud Network Film And Television Festival	2019	Best Newcomer	Project 17: Side By Side	Nominated	
Shanghai Television Festival	2019	Best Performance in Web Variety Shows	Produce 101	Won	
Tencent Video Star Awards	2018	Best Newcomer Award	Herself	Won	
Tencent Video Star Awards	2020	Annual Potential TV Drama Actor	Herself	Won	
