= Zhao Yingzi =

Chinese actress

- Born: 16 December 1990 (age 35); Yantai, Shandong, China
- Other names: Zhao Yingjuan (赵英娟), Zhao Han Ying Zi (赵韩樱子), Sarah Zhao
- Education: Central Academy of Drama
- Occupation: Actress
- Years active: 2011–present
- Agent(s): H&R Century Pictures

Chinese name
- Chinese: 赵樱子
Transcriptions

Zhao Yingzi (Chinese: 赵樱子; born 16 December 1990), previously known as Zhao Hanyingzi (Chinese: 赵韩樱子), is a Chinese actress.

== Filmography ==
=== Film ===
Year	English title	Chinese title	Role	Notes
2016	Ji Gong	济公之人皇鼎	Bai Niangzi	
2017	The Drifting Red Balloon	梭哈人生	Lin Fei'er	
2018	The Legend of Zu	大话蜀山	Ming Zhu	
2020	Fei Yu Fu	飞鱼服	Si Si	

=== Television series ===
Year	English title	Chinese title	Role	Notes
2013	Love in Spring	爱在春天	Lan Fengping	
2013	Because Love is Sunny	因为爱情有多美	Lin Duomei	
2014	New Mad Monk	新济公活佛	Qin Lulu	
2014	Because Love is a Miracle	因为爱情有奇迹	An Qiyuan	
2014	The Romance of the Condor Heroes	神雕侠侣	Cheng Ying	
2016	Mr. Right	真命天子	Yue Zhen	
2016	Jiu Rang Ka Fei You Dian Tian	就让咖啡有点甜	Xie Mingming	
2016	God of War, Zhao Yun	武神赵子龙	Li Feiyan	
2016	Switch of Fate	忍冬艳蔷薇	Ren Dong	
2016	Ares Ensanguined Youth	血染大青山	Lin Youru	
2017	Legend of the Little Monk	降龙伏虎小济公	Su Zixuan	
2017	Autumn Harvest Uprising	秋收起义	Yang Kaihui	
2017	Season Love	何所冬暖，何所夏凉	Lin Min	
2017	Love of Aurora	极光之恋	He Jingwen	
2019	Spy Hunter	天衣无缝	Lucy	
2019	Heavenly Sword and Dragon Slaying Sabre	倚天屠龙记	Yellow-robed maiden	Cameo
2019	The Legend of White Snake	新白娘子传奇	Li Bilian	Cameo
2019	Return the World to You	归还世界给你	Cen Wei	
2019	Empress of the Ming	大明风华	Consort An	
2020	Handsome Siblings	绝代双骄	Hua Yuenu	Cameo
2020	Love and Redemption	琉璃	Madame Dongfang	
2020	The Promise of Chang'an	长安诺	Helan Mingyu	
2021	You Are My Glory	你是我的荣耀	Zhou Ziqi	
2021	Refinment Of Faith	百炼成钢	Yang Kaihui	
2022	Love in Flames of War	良辰好景知幾何	Zheng Feng Qi	
2022	Side Story of Fox Volant	飞狐外传	Madame Hu	
TBA	Young Emperor Kangxi	少帝康熙	Empress Xiaochengren	
TBA	Rights and Benefits	权与利		
TBA	Liu Shan Men	我在六扇门的日子	Tang Xiaomei	
TBA	Love in Flames of War	良辰好景知几何	Zheng Fengqi	

== Discography ==
Year	English title	Chinese title	Album	Notes
2013	Sweet Burden	甜蜜负担	Because Love is Sunny OST	
2013	Slowly Will Be Fine	慢慢會好的	Because Love is Sunny OST	
2014	What Happiness Is Like	幸福的样子	Because Love is a Miracle OST	
2018	"Cheer for Youth"	打Call青春		
