= The Promise of Chang'an =

Chinese television series

- Official poster
- 长安诺
- Genre: Historical; Romance; Drama
- Written by: Liu Fang; Cheng Tingyu
- Directed by: Yin Tao
- Starring: Cheng Yi; Zhao Yingzi; Han Dong; Liang Jingxian; Han Chengyu; Yang Chaoyue
- Ending theme: "Falling Fate" by Li Yugang
- Composers: Li Jianheng; Tan Xuan; Lin Lin; Hui Hui
- Country of origin: China
- Original language: Mandarin
- No. of seasons: 1
- No. of episodes: 56

Production
- Producers: Fang Fang; Zhong Junyan; Jiang Lei; Deng Xibin
- Production location: Hengdian World Studios
- Running time: 45 minutes per episode
- Production companies: Yueshi Media; Xinmei Media; H&R Century Pictures; Zhongmang Pictures; Tangerine Media

Original release
- Network: Tencent
- Release: September 10 – November 5, 2020

The Promise of Chang'an (Chinese: 长安诺; pinyin: Cháng'ān Nuò) is a 2019-20 Chinese television series directed by Yin Tao, starred by Cheng Yi, Zhao Yingzi, and Han Dong. It premiered in Tencent Video on 10 September 2020 until 5 November 2020 every Thursdays-Saturdays. Beside that, it also aired at Line TV, LiTV, and iQIYI Taiwan.

== Plot ==
This series tells about the ups and downs of the Great Sheng Kingdom from its turbulence to prosperity under the regency of Helan Mingyu, the Empress Dowager Xianzhen.

Princess Helan Mingyu (Zhao Yingzi) is a carefree, honest, bright but naive young lady who becomes acquainted with the 9th Prince Xiao Chengxu (Cheng Yi) by chance, in which the two get along well and eventually develop feelings for each other. Prince Xiao Chengxu, repeatedly, made military exploits to help his brother becomes the emperor and establish the Great Sheng Kingdom. However, fate turns against the couple, since his only real younger brother, Xiao Chengxuan's life depends on Princess Mingyu's hand. She is forced to marry Prince Xiao Chengrui (Han Dong) after news about Prince Chengxu's death spreads and she gets trapped in a cruel Harem life.

When the truth behind his mother's death is exposed, Prince Chengxu is determined to usurp the throne and take revenge, but Emperor Xiao Chengrui suddenly dies from an old illness of his after decreeing Prince Qiyuan, his son with Princess Mingyu, to succeed the throne, which keeps Prince Chengxu from usurping the throne. Prince Chengxu is forced to assist Prince Qiyuan until he reaches maturity while trying to revive his relationship with Princess Mingyu. As the time passed, Prince Qiyuan becomes dissatisfied with Prince Chengxu controlling him and hates him more after find out about his affair with his mother.

Princess Mingyu, the Empress Dowager, is now torn, as the desires and the needs of her people outweigh her own, forcing her to uses her wisdom to bring peace to her beloved people and the nation. However, Prince Chengxu, unexpectedly, dies in the battle while protecting Prince Qiyuan who passes away with his most favorite wife. For the sake of the Great Sheng kingdom's future, Grand Empress Dowager Mingyu, once again, must forget her needs and accompany her only living grandson to the throne.

== Cast ==
=== Main ===
- Cheng Yi as 9th Prince Xiao Chengxu
  - Zhou Aoyun as child Xiao Chengxu
  - "Prince of Yan" (燕王)→"Prince Regent" (摄政王)
    Brave and fierce, he repeatedly makes military exploits to help Chengrui become the Emperor and establishes the Great Sheng Kingdom, but, is suspected, due to his high military achievements. He meets Mingyu in Yonglin and falls in love with her, but instead marries Yuying and Kelan. After learns the truth behind his mother's death, he decides to usurp power and take revenge, but eventually becomes Qiyuan's regent. He is, later, shot by Li Sitong with an arrow while saving Qiyuan and dies in battle.
- Zhao Yingzi as Helan Mingyu
  - "Princess of Yonglin County" (雍臨郡主)→"Consort Li" (麗妃)→"Consort Xian of the Yongning Hall" (永寧殿賢妃)→"Empress Dowager Xianzhen" (賢貞皇太后)→"Grand Empress Dowager" (太皇太后)
    Younger sister to Wanyin and Keyong. Bright, talented and intelligent, she is known as "The First Beauty of the North" (北境第一美女). In her younger days, she met and fell in love with Chengxu, but is forced to marry Chengrui, to save Chengxuan, Chengxu's real younger brother. She, then, bore Chengrui a son, who would becomes the next Emperor. After Qiyuan's death, she becomes their little son's regent and, later, the Grand Empress Dowager of the Great Sheng Kingdom to her grandson.
- Han Dong as 3rd Prince Xiao Chengrui
  - "King of Shengzhou" (盛州王)→"Emperor" (皇帝)
    Ambitious and far-sighted, he forced Princess Consort Mu's death so he can ascended the throne. Regardless of his trust of Chengxu, he is filled with jealousy and afraid of Chengxu's outstanding military exploits. He also takes Chengxu's lover, Mingyu, as one of his consort and forces her to love him. After having decreed, Qiyuan is to succeed to his throne, he, then, dies when an old illness of his re-occurs.

=== Supporting ===
Shengzhou → Great Sheng

- Wang Jinsong as Xiao Shangyuan
  - Leader and ruler of Shengzhou who is actually choose Chengxu to be his successor.
- Wang Lin as Princess Consort Mu
  - Shangyuan's primary wife and mother of Chengxu and Chengxuan who is forced to committed suicide since she knows the truth about succession of the throne.
- He Zhonghua as 2nd Prince Xiao Chengli
  - "Prince of Zheng" (鄭王)
    A man with great wisdom, but always indifferent to everything, staying out of the way, and doesn't want to fight for power or having intention at political affairs, also never arguing with others.
- Wang Luxin as Xiao Qishuo, Chengli's elder son
  - "Prince Yi of Chang" (益昌王)
- Xu Haojie as Xiao Qida, Chengli's younger son
  - "Prince Wei of Wu" (威武王)
- Wu Jingjing as Helan Yunqi
  - "Consort of the 3rd Prince" (三皇子妃)→"Princess Consort" (王妃)→"Empress Consort" (皇帝后)→"Empress Dowager Yuanzhen" (元貞皇太后)
    Oldest granddaughter of Helan Mingzhe and elder cousin to Keyong, Wanyin, and Mingyu. Kind, gentle, dignified, and virtuous, she married Chengrui as his principal wife and always supports him whatever he want to do or get. Following his ascension as the emperor, she becomes the empress of Great Sheng and empress dowager after Qiyuan's ascension.
- Liu Mengmeng as Helan Wanyin
  - "Princess of Yonglin County" (雍臨郡主)→"Crown Princess Consort of Xiqi" (西齊世子妃)→"Noble Consort of the Guanju Hall" (關雎殿貴妃)
    Younger granddaughter of Helan Mingzhe, sister to Keyong and Mingyu who firstly married Situ Kun. Having been overshadowed by Mingyu when they still in Yonglin and abused in Xiqi, she becomes a ruthless person. After Xiqi surrender, she eventually becomes Chengrui's consort and bore him a son who would be the crown prince. However, she poisoned herself shortly after her only son's death before reach the adulthood.
- Zhang Moxi as Chengrui's consort
  - "Consort Qiao of Hui" (喬惠妃)→"Consort Shu of the Hande Hall" (函德殿淑妃)→"Consort Dowager" (皇太妃)
    Yuying's aunt and Qirong's mother. She becomes crazy after learn about her only son's suicide.
- ... as Chengrui's consort
  - "Consort Liang" (良妃)→"Consort De of the Han Su'an Hall" (函夙安殿德妃)→"Consort Dowager" (皇太妃)
    A woman who is in a poor health by living in seclusion for many years in temples and chanting the Buddha.
- Zhang Yiluan as Lady Lan
  - "Beauty Lan" (兰美人)→"Lan Zhaoyi of the Jiguang Hall" (吉光閣兰昭儀)
    One of Chengrui's consort and Qihan's mother who gets imprisoned due to her witch and committed suicide later on.
- Han Chengyu as Xiao Qihan
  - "Prince of Su" (肅王)
    Chengrui's first and eldest son, from Lady Lan who has crush on Zhen'er and banned by Mingyu later, but pardoned after her grandson's ascension to the throne.
- Zhao Dongze as Xiao Qiyuan
  - Liao Zhenhao as child Xiao Qiyuan
  - Kang Jiaze as teenage Xiao Qiyuan
  - "Prince of Guangling" (廣陵王)
    Chengrui's sixth son, from Mingyu who ascends the throne upon his father's death and regented by Chengxu as he still minor at that time. He later died following the death of Ruoxuan, his beloved person after order his mother to keep the Great Sheng into a peaceful nation.
- Tang Ruixue as Situ Zhen
  - Sun Menghan as young Situ Zhen
  - "Princess of Western Qi County" (西齊郡主)→"Empress of the Fenghuan Hall" (鳳寰殿皇后)
    Situ Cheng's daughter who entered the palace along with Lingyi, Ruoxuan, and Chun Yu to accompany Qiyuan while later becomes his empress. However, she hates both of Ruoxuan and Lingyi badly due to his favors on them.
- Yang Chaoyue as Dong Ruoxuan
  - Lü Chenyue as young Dong Ruoxuan
  - "Noble Consort of the Qingzhi Hall" (清芷殿貴妃)
    Dong Yizhi's illegitimate daughter who entered the palace to accompany Qiyuan. She and Qiyuan actually had known each other since childhood and had mutual admiration while later became his most favorite consort. She died suddenly due to her illness after their only son's death.
- Zhang Yaoxi as Lady Chang, one of Qiyuan's consort who later bore him a son.
- Pan Chuqiao as the little emperor
  - Qiyuan's only living son who ascends the throne after his father's death under the supervision of his grandmother, Mingyu.
- Shi Lijie as Rou'er, Situ Zhen's maid who favored by Qiyuan after being beaten by her.
- Fu Mengni as Lu Lingyi
  - Feng Youran as young Lu Lingyi
    A girl who entered the palace to accompany Qiyuan and befriended well with Ruoxuan.
- Christine Zheng as Xiao Shu, Chengxiao's daughter who becomes one of Qiyuan–her cousin's consort.
- Aaron Xue as Xiao Qirong
  - Dongli Wuyou as child Xiao Qirong
  - Yang Jingtian as teenage Xiao Qirong
  - "Prince of Hejian" (河間王)→"Prince Yong of the First Rank" (永親王)
    Chengrui's seventh son who likes Ruoxuan, but committed suicide after knowing that he can't be together with her.
- Fu Fangjun as 4th Prince Xiao Chengyao
  - "Prince of Han" (漢王)
    Domineering, arrogant, and ambitious, he gets demoted into a commoner and imprisoned after all of his deeds are exposed, then died in the prison not long after that.
- Jian Daili as Princess Consort of Han, Chengyao's wife
- Li Ze as 5th Prince Xiao Chengtai
  - "Prince of Wei" (衛王)
    Chengyao's follower who has an impatient nature
- Zhu Xiangyang as 6th Prince Xiao Chengjie
  - "Prince of Zhao" (趙王)
- Zhang Jiayou as 8th Prince Xiao Chengxiao
  - "Prince of Chen" (陳王)
- Huang Yi as Su Yuying
  - "Princess of Shengzhou County" (盛州郡主)→"Princess Consort of Yan" (燕王妃)→"Princess Consort Regent" (摄政王妃)
    Consort Qiao of Hui's niece who likes Chengxu since young and uses a trick to get the emperor granted her marriage with him, which she becomes his principal wife but ends up with later hang herself.
- Zhao Ruihan as Ke Lan
  - "Lan Ruren of the Prince of Yan Manor" (燕王府的兰孺人)
    Chengxu's concubine who came from Yonglin and often get hurt by Yuying, his principal wife. She forced Yuying to reconcile with their husband and drive out from the Prince of Yan Manor while later died due to her illness.
- Zhao Wenhao as 10th Prince Xiao Chengxuan
  - "Prince of Yu" (豫王)→"Prince Yu of the First Rank" (豫親王)
    Only full younger brother of Chengxu who died due to his pox.
- Dong Yixiao as Prince of Li (厉王)
- Lu Xingyu as Dong Yizhi
  - Prince of Xin'an (新安王)
    Former minister of Great Liang who surrender to Great Sheng.
- He Jiayi as Xiang Yi, Yizhi's primary wife and Ruoxuan's stepmother
- Qu Gang as Qiyuan and Qirong's teacher
- Wang Jianlong as official Wang Weiyi
- Yang Chunrui as official Lin Fang
- Huang Xin as Shangyuan's lieutenant general
- Yan Jiahui as De'an, Chengrui's subordinate
- Li Junyi as Yan Hai, Chengxu's subordinate
- Yuan Hong as Wang Sheng, Chengxu's subordinate
- Zhang Chao as Nan Du, Chengxu's subordinate
- Tian Juncheng as Li Wencheng, teacher of Chengxu, Mingyu, and Qihan
- Tao Siyuan as He Shaoyong, Qihan's subordinate after taking refuge with Chengxu
- Zhao Zihan as Chun Yu
  - Chen Duoyi as young Chun Yu
    A girl who entered the palace and becomes Ruoxuan's maid.
- Guo Yang as Su Qiu, Princess Consort Mu's maid
- Liang Jingxian as Ling Zhen'er
  - Initially a daughter of the late prime minister of the destroyed Muqing State, she choose to become Mingyu's maid and confidant since Mingyu once save her and swear to loyal on her. Kind-hearted, affectionate, extremely soft and firm, also loves cooking, she has always secretly loved Chengxu, but never thought of fighting with Mingyu. She later moves to like Qihan, but become strangers to him after she report that his biological mother, Lady Lan used a witch cup.
- Zhang Qian as Ling'er, Mingyu's maid
- Tan Limin as Mama Li, Chengxu's nanny who help Mingyu deliver her baby in Yongning Hall
- Ding Siyu as Ge'er, Yunqi's maid
- Dong Hui as Hui'er
  - Mingyu's maid in Shengzhou who betrays her and becomes Wanyin's maid. She is very arrogant and domineering, always try to difficult Mingyu everywhere, which she putted to death by Mingyu later.
- Bo Zhiyi as Wen'er, Wanyin's maid in Shengzhou who serve her after Hui'er's death.
- Guo Junge as Consort Shu's maid
- Li Mengqi as Zhui'er, Lady Lan's maid
- Zhu Xiaojuan as Qiyuan's maidservant
- Fang Han as Qiyuan's maidservant
- Chen Yue as Su Xi, Yuying's maid
- Bai Hong as Aunt Zhang
- Chen Jingyu as Li Manfu, Chengrui's eunuch
- Wei Jinsong as Eunuch Wang, Mingyu's eunuch in the palace
- Li Changan as Chengtai's strategist
- Feng Lijun as Xiao Linzi
  - Zhang Liangyu as young Xiao Linzi
    Qiyuan's eunuch who sent by Mingyu to guard the mausoleum for assisting Qiyuan and Yingxuan elope.
- Yu Aiqun as a priest of the Mingguang Temple
- Lu Wenyu as a man who kidnapped Qiyuan
- Zhang Tao as a man who kidnapped Qiyuan
- Song Jianxin as a laborer who worked with Qiyuan when he got kidnapped

Yonglin

- Shen Baoping as Helan Mingzhe
  - Esteemed leader and ruler of Yonglin, grandfather of Yunqi, Keyong, Wanyin, and Mingyu.
- Ray Chang as Helan Keyong
  - The only grandson of Helan Mingzhe who would succeed him in throne and older brother to Wanyin and Mingyu.

Western Qi (Xiqi)

- Wang Gang as Situ Yin
  - Monarch and ruler of Xiqi, father to Situ Kun and Situ Cheng.
- Huang Youming as 1st Prince Situ Kun, Wanyin's first husband
- Huang Peng as 2nd Prince Situ Cheng, Situ Zhen's father
- Ren Xuehai as an envoy
- Zhang Gong as an advisor
- Feng Wusheng as a chief guard commander
- Jiang Yingzi as Xiang Qin, Wanyin's maid in Xiqi who is killed by Situ Kun
- Luo Ting as Imperial Physician Lin

Great Liang (Daliang)

- Yang Jinheng as Emperor Mingde
  - Monarch and ruler of the Great Liang Kingdom who killed by Xiao Chengxu later.
- Ma Jinghan as minister Xue Ji
- Lei Da as general Ling Feng
- Lai Yi as general Ling Qi, Ling Feng's son
- Yang Chengming as general Chen Wenzhi
- Jiang Zhenhao as governor Hong Guangzhi, Xue Ji's former lieutenant

Others

- Wu Bin as Zhang Kaiyuan, Xishu's general
- Shen Xuewei as Li Sitong, Xiyue's people who attack the Great Sheng

== Soundtrack ==
No.	Title	Lyrics	Music	Singer	Length
1.	"Falling Fate (落缘)" (Ending Theme Song)	Wang Shengning	Xiang Ying	Li Yugang	4:10
2.	"Counting Red (数红)"	Duan Sisi		Yin Lin	4:35
3.	"Hair Like Frost (发如霜)"	He Huihui and Lin Lin	Wang Zitong	Meng Zikun and Fu Mengni	5:43

== Production ==
Filming started in September 2018 and finished on 15 January 2019 at Hengdian World Studios.

== Broadcast ==
Channel	Country	Airing Date	Notes
Tencent Video	China	September 10, 2020	
WeTV	Taiwan	September 10, 2020	
Line TV	Taiwan	September 10, 2020	
Rakuten Viki	Canada	September 10, 2020	
Hub VV Drama	Singapore	December 25, 2020	At 21:00
Hong Kong Open TV	Hong Kong	April 15, 2021	Every Monday to Friday at 21:30 – 22:30
CTi Entertainment	Taiwan	November 12, 2021	Every Monday to Friday at 21:00 – 22:00
Channel Ginga Co., Ltd	Japan	January 7, 2022	Every Monday to Friday at 23:00 – 24:00 / 09:30 – 10:30

== Ratings (Hong Kong) ==
Episode	Airing Date	Average Ratings
28–32	May 24, 2021– May 28, 2021	1.4
33–36	May 31, 2021 – June 4, 2021	1.5

== See also ==
- Xiaozhuang Epic
