= Heart Signal (Chinese TV series) =

Chinese reality show

- Genre: Entertainment; Reality
- Presented by: See below
- Country of origin: China
- Original language: Chinese
- No. of seasons: 9
- No. of episodes: 60

Production
- Production location: China
- Running time: 85 minutes

Original release
- Network: Tencent Video
- Release: 26 August 2018 – 6 October 2022

Heart Signal (Chinese: 心动的信号) is a Chinese dating reality television show distributed by Tencent Video. It is based on the South Korean reality TV show of the same name. Season 1 of the show aired in 2018, followed by season 2 in 2019, season 3 in 2020, season 4 in 2021, season 5 in 2022, season 6 in 2023, season 7 in 2024, season 8 in 2025, and season 9 in 2026.

== Rules for the cast ==
- Cast members must return to their co-living house every night
- Cast members are not allowed to reveal their birth year nor occupation before the second day
- Cast members are not allowed to directly confess to their love during the stay
- At the end of each day, individual cast members can only send one anonymous text message to one other person of their choice. They are not permitted to disclose their identity in the message
- Cast members can go out on a date with one person of choice with the following additional rules:
  1. Female cast members name a location of choice for the date, matches are made when male cast members pick from the list of locations proposed by the women
  2. Cast members are not allowed to tell anyone about the location they chose or pick

== Panelists ==
Season 1

- Zhu Yawen
- Zhang Yuqi
- Yang Chaoyue
- Jiang Sida
- Guan Hong
- Jiang Zhenyu

Season 2

- Du Haitao
- Victoria Song
- Yang Chaoyue
- Zheng Kai
- Rainie Yang
- Liu Xuan

Season 3

- Du Haitao
- Qi Wei
- Hans Zhang
- Ding Yuxi
- Yang Chaoyue
- Yang Qikun

Season 4

- Du Haitao
- Angelababy
- Guo Qilin
- Victor Ma
- Song Zuer
- Li Xueqin

Season 5

- Angelababy
- Meng Ziyi
- Silence Wang
- Wu Xin
- Lee Seung-hyun

Season 6

- Du Haitao
- Jerry Yan
- Rainie Yang
- Yin Haoyu
- Meng Ziyi
- He Chaolian

Season 7

- Du Haitao
- Ariel Lin
- Jerry Yan
- Xu Minghao
- Rao Xueman
- Zhang Chunye
- Ming Xi

Season 8

- Du Haitao
- Hanikezi
- Victor Ma
- Qian Zhuang
- Xu Minghao
- Jerry Yan
- Zhang Chunye

Season 9

- Du Haitao
- Dai Xu
- Fiona Sit
- Yang Chaoyue
- Zhang Chunye
- Huang Shenshen

== Cast members ==
Season 1
Name	Gender	Occupation	Horoscope
Xiang Tiange (向天歌)	Female	Student at Columbia University (Majoring in Applied Statistics)	Taurus
Zhou You (周游)	Male	Founder and CEO of UpdateStudio	Sagittarius
Hu Jinming (胡金铭)	Female	English teacher	Pisces
Jiang Mingliang/Oscar (江铭亮)	Male	Model	Scorpio
Li Junjie (李君婕)	Female	Shanghai Theatre Academy Performance Major (Drama)	Leo
Liu Zexuan (刘泽煊)	Male	Aston Martin GT champion driver, FIA F3 driver, Asian Formula Renault driver, founder and CEO of Emc2 Evisu Racing team	Aquarius
Guo Rubin (郭如彬)	Male	Founder of 17hiAPP	Leo
Wang Jingwen (王靖雯)	Female	Dance teacher	Gemini

Season 2
Name	Gender	Birth Year	Occupation	Horoscope
Ryan Zhao/ Zhao QiJun (赵琦君）	Male	1992	Investment Manager of Beijing Cultural Center Fund	Sagitarius
Chen Yichen (陈奕辰）	Male	1996	Student at the University of Canberra, part-time English teacher	Libra
Yang Kaiwen (杨凯雯)	Female	1994	Fashion designer	Virgo
William/ Wu Xiangwei (吴翔威)	Male	1991	Sommelier, brand ambassador of a champagne brand in China	Gemini
Zhang Tian (张天)	Female	1996	Film and television producer	Capricorn
Wu Pei (吴沛)	Female	1990	Internet company human resources director	Aquarius
Huang Zhengxuan (黄钲轩)	Male	1991	Head of sports medicine at an anti-aging and cancer prevention center in Beijing	Virgo
Pan Zhengru ( 潘政如)	Female	1995	Event planning company general manager	Taurus

Season 3
Name	Gender	Birth Year	Occupation	Horoscope
Yao Muxi (姚沐希)	Female	1998	2D Artist	Taurus
Chen Yandi (陈延迪）	Male	1992	Ph.D Candidate in Dentistry (Paediatric)	Sagittarius
Zhaxi Pengcuo (扎西彭措)	Male	1992	Head of operations at a real estate development company	Scorpio
Xue Yixing (薛逸星)	Male	1991	CEO of a MCN	Scorpio
Zhong Peiyan (钟佩妍)	Female	1994	Founder of a technology company	Libra
Zheng Qinxin (郑琴心)	Female	1994	Pipa Performer, Event MC	Virgo

Season 4
Name	Gender	Birth Year	Occupation	Horoscope
Ma Zijia (馬子佳)	Male	1995	Chairman of an IT consulting company	Cancer
Chen Siming (陳思銘）	Male	1996	Overseas operation executive of an Internet game company	Capricorn
Deng Kaiwei (鄧凱慰)	Male	1991	Founder of an Educational Institution	Aquarius
Chen Yexiong (陳業雄)	Male	1995	Talk show host	Aquarius
Mai Sui (麥穗)	Female	1994	Secretary to chairman at an industrial investment company	Cancer
Hong Chenchen (洪成成)	Female	1995	IT Engineer	Sagittarius
Fang Binhan (方彬涵)	Female	1996	Media company founder cum fashion blogger	Taurus
Kong Ruchun (孔汝淳)	Female	2000	Student at Shenzhen University (Majoring in Broadcast Hosting)	Aquarius
Luo Yuejia (羅悅嘉)	Female	1991	Educator	Leo

Season 5
Name	Gender	Birth Year	Occupation	Horoscope
Xue Zheyang (薛喆陽)	Male	1995	Business Strategy Analyst (UBS)	Capricorn
Guo Haoran (郭浩然)	Male	1998	Musical theater actor	Leo
Zhang Genyuan (張根源)	Male	1999	Investment manager	Taurus
Chen Zonglun (陳宗倫)	Male	1996	Manager of PwC Consulting Services Department	Aquarius
Sun Xing (孫興)	Male	1995	Product manager of International Internet company	Scorpio
Li Wanqian (李宛倩)	Female	1996	Blogger	Sagittarius
Wang Qiuyi (王秋怡)	Female	1995	Senior consultant of Ernst & Young in China	Libra
Li Nieshuangyu (李聶霜玉)	Female	1997	Macroeconomics researcher at a financial institution	Aries
Jin Jiayue (金佳悅)	Female	1998	Sports event MC	Virgo

Season 6
Name	Gender	Birth Year	Occupation	Horoscope
Wang Kaizhi (王塏智)	Male	1999	Trainee at an accounting company	Pisces
Zeng Zhaohao (曾昭顥)	Male	1996	Financial analyst	Scorpio
Hou Zhuocheng (侯卓成)	Male	1999	Graduate student from Peking University	Scorpio
Fan Yilan (范依嵐)	Female	1999	Trainee at a bank office	Aries
Zhang Jin (張巾)	Female	1999	Dance teacher	Pisces
Sun Jingjun (孫靖鈞)	Male	1999	Master student at Tsinghua University	Gemini
Lu Ke (蘆可)	Male	1997	Business manager	Gemini
Cheng Jingqi (程靖淇)	Male	1994	Table tennis player and training instructor	Pisces
Li Yujiao (李玉嬌)	Female	2000	Graduate student from University of Science and Technology Beijing	Libra
Li Yumei (李玉媚)	Female	2000	Student at Renmin University, trainee at a private equity investment institution	Libra
Hou Siyi (侯斯譯)	Female	2000	Operations at an Internet company	Libra
Yang Ruqing (楊汝晴)	Female	1995	Brand marketing manager of an Internet company	Aries
Liu Zujun (劉祖君)	Female	1994	Consultant at an education consulting company	Libra

Season 7
Name	Gender	Birth Year	Occupation	Horoscope
Weng Qingya (翁青雅)	Female	2000	Financial Media trainee	Gemini
Serik Medet (芈迭)	Male	1993	Customer Consulting and Communication Department of a Technology Co., Ltd.	Leo
Liu Yufan (刘雨璠)	Female	1996	Materials Engineer in an automobile company	Cancer
Zhao Muchen (赵牧辰)	Male	1996	GTM Product Manager at a technology company	Scorpio
Peng Gao (彭高)	Male	1997	Algorithm engineer at an Internet company	Sagittarius
Sun Leyan (孙乐言)	Female	2000	News anchor at Guangdong Television	Scorpio
Li Dinghao (李定豪)	Male	1999	Manager and designer of jewelry brand	Libra
Ni Yutong (倪雨桐)	Female	1996	Teacher at an international art institution	Gemini
Oscar Tu (涂毓麟)	Male	1998	Educational institution partner, TVB actor	Virgo
Ruan Xiaomi (阮小咪)	Female	1996	Fashion brand manager, barbecue restaurant owner	Capricorn
Tomo (张灏梁)	Male	1993	Founder of Wakeboarding Club, Instructor, Physiotherapy Clinic	Leo
Wang Qi (王琪)	Female	2001	Senior in fashion design	Sagittarius

Season 8
Name	Gender	Birth Year	Occupation	Horoscope
Wang Jue (王珏)	Female	2001	Cross-border Fashion Export Entrepreneur, Model	Aries
Jin Yuhang (金禹行)	Male	1997	Manager at a General Merchandise Company	Scorpio
Wang Lechen (王乐晨)	Male	1998	Marketing Manager at an Environmental Tech Company	Leo
Ke Ailin (柯爱林)	Female	1998	Acupuncturist at a Traditional Chinese Medicine Clinic	Scorpio
Lu Yuan (卢远)	Female	2002	Postgraduate Law student	Sagittarius
Xu Rulan (徐如蓝)	Female	1999	Assistant Project Manager at an Architecture Institute	Cancer
Rui Long (瑞龙)	Male	2000	IT staff in the Audit Department of a Watch company	Aries
Fang Yijiong (方益炯)	Male	1995	Ophthalmologist	Libra
Wang Yifan (王艺帆)	Female	2002	Museum guide	Gemini
Jiao Zhiheng (焦峙衡)	Male	1998	Client Manager at an Internet company	Leo
Sun Hanqing (孙涵清)	Female	2000	Management trainee for a Sanitary Ware Brand	Virgo
Liu Zihan (刘子晗)	Male	1995	Manager of a Sports and Culture company	Sagittarius

Season 9
Name	Gender	Birth Year	Occupation	Horoscope
Cao Yiheng (曹以恒)	Male	2003	Mural Artist	Pisces
Chen Hewen (陈鹤文)	Male	2002	General Manager of a Business and Trading Company	Aries
Cui Kaiyi (崔凯怡)	Female	2004	Student Midwife Intern at an Obstetrics and Gynaecology Hospital in Beijing	Aquarius
Cui Yihang (崔译航)	Male	2001	Executive Director of a New Energy Company	Aries
Liang Renfang (梁人方)	Female	2000	Musical Theatre Actress	Libra
Liang Xiaoyu (梁潇雨)	Female	1998	Entrepreneur	Aquarius
Sha Yueer (沙玥儿)	Female	2004	Futures Trading Intern at an Energy Company	Cancer
Sun Bohan (孙柏涵)	Male	2000	Architectural Engineer, Freelance model	Cancer
Sun Qimeng (孙启萌)	Female	1999	Bank Employee	Virgo
Wu Siying (吴思颖)	Female	2000	Fashion Brand Operations Specialist	Libra
Wu Xingying (吴星颖)	Female	2000	Fashion Brand Operations Specialist	Libra
Yu Yang (于洋)	Male	1995	Mixing Engineer and Music Producer	Pisces
Zhao Xilun (赵希伦)	Male	2004	Intern at an Urban Development and Investment Company	Aquarius
