= Sisterhood (TV series) =

2024 Indian TV series

- Genre: Drama
- Directed by: Nayana Shyam
- Starring: Nidhi Bhanushali; Bhagyashree Limaye; Anvesha Vij; Nitya Mathur
- Country of origin: India
- Original language: Hindi
- No. of seasons: 1
- No. of episodes: 5

Production
- Production location: India
- Running time: 25 mins

Original release
- Network: Amazon miniTV
- Release: 14 June 2024

Sisterhood is an Indian Hindi-language drama television series directed by Nayana Shyam. The series features Nidhi Bhanushali, Bhagyashree Limaye, Anvesha Vij and Nitya Mathur in the lead role. The first season premiered on Amazon miniTV on 14 June 2024.

== Cast ==
- Nidhi Bhanushali as Gargi Oberoi, a new student who intends to transfer after six months
- Bhagyashree Limaye as Ann D'Silva, a repeating student who is naive in nature
- Anvesha Vij as Zoya Baig, the topper of the class and Nikita's best friend
- Nitya Mathur as Nikita Waghmare, a rebel girl and Zoya's best friend
- Saumya Uniyal as Kiara Sharma, the girls' rival
- Meenal Kapoor as Sister Dianne
- Sangeetha Balachandran as Sister Rosie

== Episodes ==
Series	Episodes	Originally released
1	5	14 June 2024

== Music ==
Tracklist
No.	Title	Length
1.	"Tu Yaar Hay Wohi"
2.	"Gucchad Mucchad"

== Reception ==
Ashna Santosh of Times now News praised the story, direction as well as the acting performances of the show and gave it a rating of 3 out of 5 saying that, Each actress brings depth to her character, making the friendships feel genuine and heartfelt. Their chemistry on screen is palpable, drawing viewers into their world and making the story all the more compelling. Director Nayana Shyam has done a fantastic job of capturing the nuances of teenage life. The story is well-paced, and the episodes are filled with moments that are both touching and entertaining. Archika Khurana from Times of India gave it a rating 3 out of 5 saying that Each character stands out with distinct and relatable traits reminiscent of school acquaintances. Gargi exudes confidence, Zoya embodies discipline, Nikita epitomizes rebellion, and Ann displays naivety, with each character adding depth and unique flair to the series.
