= Let Dai =

South Korean manhwa series

- Cover of the Net Comics edition of Let Dai vol. 3 (2006), art by Won Soo-yeon

Let 다이 Let dai
- Genre: Boys love
- Author: Won Soo-yeon
- Publisher: Wink
- English publisher: (United States) Net Comics
- Original run: 1995–2005
- Volumes: 15

Let Dai is a Korean manhwa series by Won Soo-yeon. It is published in English by NETCOMICS.

== Plot ==
The story of Let Dai revolves around forbidden love and betrayal. Set in a soulless neo-Seoul ruled by young punks and pleasure seekers where lives the amoral teenage protagonist named Dai who is the living embodiment of the city's beauty and cruelty. As the leader of the vicious Furies gang, Dai seduces everyone who lays eyes on him, only to blind them to his own barbaric nature. When honest schoolboy Jaehee rescues a beautiful girl from being mugged by the Furies, he doesn't realize how this brief encounter will plunge him into a downward spiral of unbridled passion and unfathomable pain. From his brutal gang initiation to an unspeakable act committed against his girlfriend, the story shows how Jaehee wavers uncomfortably between revulsion and fascination. And in Dai he finds a tender, caring friend one moment and a heartless sociopath the next, awakening strange and unhealthy desires in Jaehee that he could never before have imagined.

== Characters ==
Jaehee Yoo
A normal high school kid who buys a rose for his girlfriend on Valentine's Day until he meets Dai. In the midst of pain and suffering Dai inflicts on him, Jaehee is drawn to Dai through doubts and love.

Dai Lee
Dai's very existence proves that evil is real. With his unpredictable and unreasonable violent behavior and madness, At first, Dai seems to be the Devil himself, but as time passes he gradually shows his true nature and forms a deep bond with Jaehee.

Eunhyung Song
Jaehee's girlfriend and Yooneun's younger sister. She is bubbly and cute, with a bright personality. However, being raped by some members of the Furies changes her life forever.

Yooneun Song

Eunhyung's older sister who gets involved with Dai when she gets in trouble with the Furies and is saved by Jaehee. Having fallen in love with Jaehee, Yooneun tries to bring Jaehee, who is drawn to Dai, back to his innocent days.

Naru Hagi
A class clown and close friend of Jaehee. Always wears different wigs and hats. He falls in love with Eunhyung but fate brings them apart.
