= Full House (South Korean TV series) =

2004 South Korean TV series

- Promotional poster
- Genre: Romance; Comedy; Drama
- Based on: Full House by Won Soo-yeon
- Written by: Min Hyo-jung
- Directed by: Pyo Min-soo
- Starring: Rain; Song Hye-kyo; Han Eun-jung; Kim Sung-soo
- Theme music composer: Destiny 운명 WHY (와이)
- Composer: Lee Kyung-seob
- Country of origin: South Korea
- Original language: Korean
- No. of episodes: 16

Production
- Executive producer: Kim Jong-sik (KBS)
- Producers: Jung Sung-hyo; Park Chang-sik; Lee Ho-seong
- Production locations: Incheon; Shanghai; Thailand
- Editor: Kim Jung-woo
- Camera setup: Multi-camera
- Running time: 60 minutes
- Production company: Kim Jong-hak Production

Original release
- Network: KBS2
- Release: July 14 – September 2, 2004

Related
- Full House (Philippines); Full House Take 2; Full House (Thailand)

Full House (Korean: 풀하우스) is a 2004 South Korean television series starring Rain, Song Hye-kyo, Han Eun-jung, and Kim Sung-soo. Based on the manhwa Full House by Won Soo-yeon, the romantic comedy series aired on KBS2 on Monday and Friday at 21:50 (KST) for 16 episodes from July 14 to September 2, 2004.

Considered a pioneer of the "romantic comedy" genre in Korean drama, the drama was a great success in Asia and helped propel the Korean Wave.

== Synopsis ==
Han Ji-eun (Song Hye-kyo), an aspiring writer, lives in a house called Full House built by her late father. One day, her two best friends tricked her into believing that she has won a free vacation to Shanghai, China. While Ji-eun is away, they sell her house. On the plane, she meets a famous actor named Lee Young-jae (Rain). The couple slowly become acquaintances during her vacation, and when Ji-eun returns, she discovers that her house has been sold to him.

Although Ji-eun and Young-jae do not get along with each other due to their opposing habits, they agree to live with each other. At first, Ji-eun works as his maid to buy her house back. However, the couple later enters into a contract marriage as Young-jae wants to make his crush, Kang Hye-won (Han Eun-jung), jealous. Complications arise as Ji-eun and Young-jae become attracted to each other.

== Cast ==
- Rain as Lee Young-jae

A popular Korean actor. Despite seeming to be egotistical and stubborn, he cares deeply for his friends very much. Young-jae possesses secret unrequited feelings for his childhood friend, Hye-won, but later falls in love with Ji-eun. He has a fragile relationship with his father, who is a doctor.

- Song Hye-kyo as Han Ji-eun

An optimistic and cheerful aspiring writer who lives in Full House, which she inherited from her parents. She ends up marrying Young-jae under a contract marriage to keep the house and falls in love with him.

- Han Eun-jung as Kang Hye-won

A close family friend of Young-jae who has known him since childhood. Working as a fashion designer, she also designs most of Young-jae's clothes. With her wealth and looks, Hye-won is accustomed to attention from men, but has ever only loved Yoo Min-hyuk. She is selfish and manipulative, and attempts to hold on to Min-hyuk and Young-jae at the same time.

- Kim Sung-soo as Yoo Min-hyuk

A playboy who is rich and smart, but remains detached from people due to his busy lifestyle. He is close friends with Young-jae, who confides in him his feelings for Han Ji-eun. Min-hyuk is a director of a large media company. He develops feelings for Han Ji-eun, and tries to get her to like him. Eventually, he sees that she can love no one but Lee Young-jae.

- Jang Yong as Mr. Lee, Young-jae's father
- Sunwoo Eun-sook as Mrs. Kim, Young-jae's mother
- Kim Ji-young as Young-jae's grandmother
- Lee Young-eun as Yang Hee-jin, Ji-eun's friend
- Kang Do-han as Shin Dong-wook, Hee-jin's husband
- Im Ye-jin as Dae Pyo, Young-jae's agent

== Filming locations ==
The location of the titled house, Full House, is a house built specially for the series. It is located in the Gwangyeok-si area of Incheon, near Incheon International Airport, and is a ten-minute boat ride from Sammok Harbor. The house, made mostly of wood, cost approximately US$1 million to build. Nearby sightseeing locations include Jogak (sculpture) Park on Modo Island; a bridge connects these two islands.

== Ratings ==
In this table, the blue numbers represent the lowest ratings and the red numbers represent the highest ratings.

Ep.	Original broadcast date	Average audience share	
Ep.	Original broadcast date	AGB Nielsen	
Ep.	Original broadcast date	Nationwide	Seoul
1	July 14, 2004	25.4% (1st)	25.9% (1st)
2	July 15, 2004	28.5% (1st)	29.2% (1st)
3	July 21, 2004	31.4% (1st)	32.1% (1st)
4	July 22, 2004	34.1% (1st)	35.2% (1st)
5	July 28, 2004	36.8% (1st)	37.7% (1st)
6	July 29, 2004	38.9% (1st)	40.0% (1st)
7	August 4, 2004	39.6% (1st)	40.4% (1st)
8	August 5, 2004	39.9% (1st)	40.7% (1st)
9	August 11, 2004	40.2% (1st)	40.9% (1st)
10	August 12, 2004	40.5% (1st)	41.3% (1st)
11	August 18, 2004	41.0% (1st)	42.0% (1st)
12	August 19, 2004	41.6% (1st)	42.1% (1st)
13	August 25, 2004	41.4% (1st)	42.0% (1st)
14	August 26, 2004	41.5% (1st)	42.1% (1st)
15	September 1, 2004	41.4% (1st)	42.2% (1st)
16	September 2, 2004	42.0% (1st)	42.2% (1st)
Average		37.8%	38.5%

== Musical theatre ==
A musical theatre production of Full House was staged at the Hongik Art Center beginning April 11, 2014. Yang Yo-seob and Leo (VIXX) alternate in the role of Lee Young-jae, while Jung Eun-ji and Joo alternate in the role of Han Ji-eun. Also starring were UJi (Bestie), Kim San-ho, Seo Ha-joon, and Kwak Sun-young.

== Awards and nominations ==
- 2004 KBS Drama Awards
