= Won Soo-yeon =

South Korean female manhwa artist (born 1961)

- Born: January 12, 1961 (age 65)
- Area: Artist
- Pseudonyms: Sooyeon Won; Woon Soo-yeon
- Notable works: Full House, Let Dai

- Won Soo-yeon
- Hangul: 원수연
- Hanja: 元秀蓮
- RR: Won Suyeon
- MR: Wŏn Suyŏn

Won Soo-yeon (Korean: 원수연; born January 12, 1961) is a South Korean female manhwa artist known for her romance works. She debuted in 1987 and has published several titles; among her best known serials are Full House (2002) and its sequel Full House 2 (2005). Two of her comics have been adapted into television dramas: Full House (2004) and Mary Stayed Out All Night (2010).

She is married to fellow manhwa artist Doha Kang, with whom she has two children.

== Works ==
- Elio and Yvette (1992)
- Let Dai (1995)
- Confession (manhwa anthology) (1999)
- Full House (2002)
- I Want You (2003)
- Full House 2 (2005)
- The Devil's Trill (2006)
- Mary Stayed Out All Night (2009)

== Adaptions ==
- Mary Stayed Out All Night
- Full House (2004)

== Awards ==
=== State honors ===
Name of country, year given, and name of honor
Country	Year	Honor	Ref.
South Korea (Note: Honors are given at the Korean Popular Culture and Arts Awards, arranged by the Korea Creative Content Agency and hosted by the Ministry of Culture, Sports and Tourism. They are awarded to those who have contributed to the arts and South Korea's pop culture.)	2010	Minister of Culture, Sports and Tourism Commendation	
