= List of Produce Camp 2021 contestants =

Produce Camp 2021 is a Chinese reality competition show and spin-off of the television series Produce 101. A total of 90 trainees, aged 17–28 years old from various talent agencies, compete to debut in an 11-member international boy band, with members selected by online voting from the viewers. In addition to trainees from Mainland China, Taiwan, and Hong Kong, there are also foreign trainees from many different countries such as the United States, Japan, Thailand, Russia, Ukraine, and Cuba.

== Contestants ==
The spelling of names in English are according to the official website. The Chinese contestants are presented in Eastern order (family name, given name), while the names of the foreign contestants are presented in Western order (given name, family name).

Color key

Top 11 of the week
Left the show
Eliminated in Episode 5
Eliminated in Episode 7
Eliminated in Episode 9
Eliminated in Episode 10
Final debuting members of INTO1

Company	Name	Age	Hometown	Evaluations						Rankings													
Company	Name	Age	Hometown	1st	2nd	3rd	4th	5th	6th	EP2	EP3	EP4	EP5		EP6	EP7		EP8	EP9		EP10		Final
Company	Name	Age	Hometown	1st	2nd	3rd	4th	5th	6th	#	#	#	#	Votes	#	#	Votes	#	#	Votes	#	Votes	#
Avex	Caelan Moriarty (庆怜) / (モリアティー慶怜) ^{1}	24	Havana, Cuba	B	C	B	A	B	A	12	11	8	8	11,909,999	12	13	8,698,240	6	6	5,067,520	12	12,819,271	12
Avex	Kazuma Horikawa Mitchell (和马) / (ミッチェル和馬) ^{1} ^{38}	25	New York, USA	C	C	F	Left the show			6	4	Left the show											
Avex	Mika Hashizume (米卡) / (橋爪ミカ) ^{1}	26	Hawaii, USA	B→F	B	A	A	A	A	1	1	3	4	17,639,804	6	6	12,155,973	3	3	6,977,253	4	16,255,569	4
Avex Warps	Rikimaru Chikada (力丸) / (近田力丸) ^{2}	31	Hyogo, Japan	A	A	A	A	A	A	8	8	4	3	18,446,706	3	3	14,538,347	4	4	6,503,416	3	16,591,943	3
Avex Warps	Santa Uno (赞多) / (宇野賛多) ^{2}	27	Aichi, Japan	A	C	A	A	A	A	4	2	2	2	19,576,309	4	2	14,773,950	2	2	7,435,270	2	16,611,343	2
Bad Water Entertainment (坏水娱乐)	Xie Xingyang (谢兴阳) ^{3} ^{26}	26	Hangzhou, China	F	B	C	B	B	Eliminated	51	53	35	30	3,776,073	21	23	5,453,873	30	28	1,011,332	Eliminated		28
Biubiu Culture (哔哟哔哟)	Liu Yu (刘宇) ^{4}	25	Hefei, China	A	A	A	A	A	A	7	6	1	1	21,308,912	1	4	14,433,893	1	1	11,836,817	1	25,959,880	1
Black Gold Entertainment (黑金计划)	Wei Yujie (韦语节)	23	Chongqing, China	F	B	C	Eliminated			84	86	85	80	312,079	Eliminated								80
Chen Xiaoxi Culture Media (晨小曦文化传媒)	Ye Haoran (叶皓然)	26	Zhejiang, China	C	F	F	C	Eliminated		34	40	41	36	2,974,918	38	39	2,841,539	Eliminated					39
Chengmeng Culture (程梦文化)	Gui Shangqi (贵尚奇) ^{5}	27	Sichuan, China	F	F	C	C	Eliminated		60	64	55	50	1,971,780	27	34	3,334,614	Eliminated					34
Chengmeng Culture (程梦文化)	Li Jiahao (李家豪) ^{5}	28	Chongqing, China	C	F	C	Eliminated			58	66	61	59	1,602,130	Eliminated								59
Chengmeng Culture (程梦文化)	Li Zekun (李泽坤) ^{5}	23	Shandong, China	F	B	F	Eliminated			59	67	60	57	1,644,677	Eliminated								57
Diwon Media	Ichika Uehara (上原一翔) ^{6}	32	Tokyo, Japan	B	F	F	C	Eliminated		69	65	46	44	2,324,875	39	35	3,193,118	Eliminated					35
Dream Entertainment (梦娱魅姬)	Li Jiaxiang (李嘉祥) ^{7}	28	Liaoning, China	A	C	C	Eliminated			35	43	54	64	1,338,664	Eliminated								64
Esee Model (英模文化)	Lindow Ozaki (林豆) / (大﨑リンドウ)	28	Kanagawa, Japan	F	F	F	Eliminated			52	57	69	71	831,206	Eliminated								71
Estarpro Club (eStar电竞俱乐部)	Nuo Yan / Guo Guixin (諾言) / (郭桂鑫) ^{8}	25	Guangdong, China	C	C	F	C	Eliminated		30	33	36	39	2,837,783	42	36	3,167,884	Eliminated					36
Fanling Culture (泛领文化)	Luo Yan (罗言)	22	Chongqing, China	B	A	C	C	Eliminated		65	59	51	38	2,872,334	44	37	2,918,977	Eliminated					37
FLOWSIXTEEN	He Zhenyu (何圳煜)	25	Hong Kong	B	C	B	C	Eliminated		36	45	44	47	2,199,639	51	51	311,194	Eliminated					51
FLOWSIXTEEN	Huang Kun (黄鲲) ^{9}	29	Fujian, China	C	F	C	C	Eliminated		49	56	43	42	2,534,130	50	49	525,002	Eliminated					49
FLOWSIXTEEN	Zhang Xingte (张星特) ^{19} ^{24}	22	Wenzhou, China	B	B	B	B	B	B	26	27	23	21	5,310,719	23	18	6,416,020	15	16	2,950,003	16	2,572,435	16
Godly Entertainment (虔来娱乐)	Fan Zhener (范臻尔)	28	Shandong, China	C	C	C	C	Eliminated		17	22	38	45	2,284,339	55	55	54,262	Eliminated					55
Haixi Media (海西传媒)	Jiang Dunhao (蒋敦豪) ^{10}	30	Xinjiang, China	F	F	B	C	Eliminated		42	44	56	53	1,847,270	47	47	895,160	Eliminated					47
Haohan Entertainment (浩瀚娱乐)	Xue Bayi (薛八一) ^{11}	26	Taiyuan, China	C	B	F	B	B	B	54	47	33	28	3,915,599	28	29	4,157,566	22	18	2,439,967	25	163,088	25
He Yifan Studio (何屹繁工作室)	He Yifan (何屹繁) ^{12} ^{15}	27	Yibin, China	C	F	C	B	B	Eliminated	22	26	27	31	3,550,158	26	25	4,994,831	28	30	918,424	Eliminated		30
He&She Entertainment (贺喜娱乐)	Shingo Kadowaki (门胁慎刚) ^{13}	31	Osaka, Japan	B	B	B	Eliminated			73	73	71	70	863,603	Eliminated								70
Hippo Film (河马影业)	Wu Hai (吴海)	27	Chongqing, China	B	B	B	C	B	Eliminated	55	68	53	43	2,527,470	35	28	4,160,952	29	29	961,192	Eliminated		29
Mengyang Culture (萌扬文化)	Wei Ziyue (魏子越) ^{14} ^{15}	27	Xiangyang, China	C	A	C	C	B	Eliminated	41	38	42	46	2,203,940	34	27	4,213,924	31	31	434,028	Eliminated		31
Hot Idol (好好榜样)	Yu Yang (于洋)	21	Hebei, China	A	C	B	C	Eliminated		33	39	40	41	2,612,301	43	44	1,676,054	Eliminated					44
Hot Idol (好好榜样)	Cao Zuo (曹左)	23	Chongqing, China	F	B	B	Eliminated			31	46	63	66	1,176,833	Eliminated								66
Hot Idol (好好榜样)	Oscar / Wang Zhengxiong (奥斯卡) / (王政熊) ^{16}	22	São Paulo, Brazil	A→B→A	C	B	A	A	B	10	10	10	11	10,007,720	11	5	12,336,864	17	17	2,854,135	13	12,230,067	13
Hot Idol (好好榜样)	Zhang Zhang (张璋)	20	Anhui, China	F	B	C	C	Eliminated		44	50	59	51	1,956,108	54	54	119,878	Eliminated					54
Hot Idol (好好榜样)	Liu Yandongji (刘严冬季)	20	Chengdu, China	C	F	F	Eliminated			39	52	72	75	599,028	Eliminated								75
I.E. One Entertainment (缔壹娱乐)	Rong Yao (荣耀)	19	Xinjiang, China	F	F	C	C	B	Eliminated	48	37	37	40	2,805,829	29	31	4,066,917	33	33	116,313	Eliminated		33
Individual Trainees	Chen Ruifeng (陈瑞丰)	22	Chongqing, China	C	C	F	Eliminated			81	83	83	85	221,348	Eliminated								85
Individual Trainees	David Kolosov (大卫) / (Давид Колосов)	28	Vladikavkaz, Russia	C	B	F	Eliminated			50	51	58	56	1,671,088	Eliminated								56
Individual Trainees	Han Peiquan (韩佩泉) ^{24}	21	Heilongjiang, China	A	F	F	B	Eliminated		27	21	17	19	6,354,663	33	40	2,536,229	Eliminated					40
Individual Trainees	Jing Long (井胧) ^{24}	23	Shenyang, China	B	C	B	B	B	Eliminated	11	18	14	15	8,974,409	25	33	3,616,730	25	26	1,480,501	Eliminated		26
Individual Trainees	Ling Xiao (凌箫) ^{17}	22	Xinjiang, China	C	C	F	Eliminated			53	58	66	67	1,162,165	Eliminated								67
Individual Trainees	Liu Tanghui (刘唐辉) ^{16}	20	Chongqing, China	F	B	F	Eliminated			79	79	62	61	1,418,497	Eliminated								61
Individual Trainees	Ryo Harabe (原部凌)	22	Fukuoka, Japan	B	B	B	Eliminated			72	71	73	72	764,508	Eliminated								72
Individual Trainees	Luke Pfleger (卢克)	24	Seattle, USA	C	F	C	Eliminated			88	90	82	84	233,686	Eliminated								84
Individual Trainees	Yu Gengyin (俞更寅) ^{12}	24	Shenzhen, China	A	B	A	B	B	B	25	28	24	22	4,889,952	16	22	5,842,246	23	23	1,786,773	21	1,421,946	21
Individual Trainees	Yuya Tsuzuki (都筑雄哉) ^{18}	21	Nagoya, Japan	C	C	F	Eliminated			68	72	57	60	1,511,462	Eliminated								60
Individual Trainees	Zhang Teng (张腾) ^{19}	21	Hebei, China	C	B	F	B	B	Eliminated	28	23	25	26	4,135,523	22	30	4,117,512	32	32	403,085	Eliminated		32
Insight Entertainment (洞察娱乐)	Nine / Kornchid Boonsathitpakdee (高卿尘) / (นาย / กรชิต บุญสถิต์ภักดี) ^{20}	21	Bangkok, Thailand	B	C	B	B	B	A	13	15	15	16	8,441,438	14	14	8,443,364	8	7	4,475,569	5	13,898,339	5
Insight Entertainment (洞察娱乐)	Patrick / Nattawat Finkler (尹浩宇) / (แพทริค / ณัฐวรรธ์ ฟิงค์เลอร์) ^{21}	17	Roi Et, Thailand	B→F	C	A	A	A	A	21	12	12	9	10,463,315	8	7	11,241,829	5	5	5,330,748	9	13,359,428	9
Jaywalk Newjoy (嘉行传媒)	He Yijun (何懿峻) ^{16}	20	Zhejiang, China	F	B	F	C	Eliminated		83	84	68	55	1,714,910	52	53	263,894	Eliminated					53
Jaywalk Newjoy (嘉行传媒)	Qian Zhengyu (钱政宇)	18	Heilongjang, China	F	B	F	Eliminated			80	82	81	83	235,726	Eliminated								83
Jaywalk Newjoy (嘉行传媒)	Xu Shengzi (徐圣兹)	21	Zhejiang, China	B	F	B	Eliminated			85	89	88	88	152,563	Eliminated								88
Jaywalk Newjoy (嘉行传媒)	Zhou Keyu / Daniel (周柯宇) ^{22}	18	Beijing, China / USA	A→B→F	C	C	A	A	A	2	3	5	5	16,906,210	2	1	15,266,078	7	8	4,435,889	10	13,279,523	10
Jiashang Media (嘉尚传媒)	Chen Junjie (陈俊洁)	20	Xinjiang, China	C	B	F	Eliminated			70	75	74	73	660,450	Eliminated								73
Jiashang Media (嘉尚传媒)	Li Peiyang (李沛洋)	23	Zhengzhou, China	F	B	F	Eliminated			76	55	67	68	1,157,439	Eliminated								68
Jiashang Media (嘉尚传媒)	Zheng Mingxin (郑明鑫)	18	Henan, China	F	B	F	Eliminated			77	78	76	76	506,811	Eliminated								76
Joy Media (无忧传媒)	Zhang Xinyao (张欣尧) ^{23}	26	Chifeng, Inner Mongolia	C	B	B	B	B	B	18	17	19	20	5,667,546	20	20	6,265,651	21	20	1,856,888	20	1,560,064	20
KING Holdings	Lelush / Vladislav Sidorov (利路修) / (Владислав Сидоров)	27	Vladivostok, Russia	F	B	F	B	B	A	74	49	34	29	3,869,738	19	21	6,070,507	12	10	4,019,170	17	1,960,253	17
KINGS Artists	Yuu / Yujin Kiuchi (喜内優心)	19	Chiba, Japan	C	B	C	Eliminated			71	69	64	63	1,371,731	Eliminated								63
L. Tao Entertainment (龙韬娱乐)	Lin Yuxiu (林煜修) ^{15}	21	Taipei, Taiwan	F	B	F	Eliminated			38	35	45	58	1,614,903	Eliminated								58
Lu Dinghao Studio	Lu Dinghao (陸定昊) ^{25} ^{26}	25	Shanghai, China	F	B	F	B	Eliminated		23	24	30	33	3,194,874	40	41	2,332,588	Eliminated					41
M+ Entertainment (木加互娱)	Zeng Hanjiang (曾涵江)	20	Sichuan, China	B	B	F	C	B	Eliminated	47	41	39	37	2,872,735	32	26	4,523,109	26	27	1,013,975	Eliminated		27
Mango TV (星芒互娱)	Shao Mingming (邵明明) ^{27} ^{33}	23	Anhui, China	C	F	F	B	Eliminated		15	19	21	23	4,377,584	37	42	2,233,856	Eliminated					42
Migo Tom (哇偶文化)	Wang Xiaochen (王孝辰) ^{28}	23	Hubei, China	F	B	B	C	Eliminated		56	60	50	52	1,888,192	45	45	1,407,021	Eliminated					45
Mistar	Hu Yetao (胡烨韬) ^{24}	20	Beijing, China	A	A	A	B	B	B	37	34	29	25	4,212,453	31	32	3,631,076	27	25	1,532,797	23	823,603	23
Musical Freedom (橙子映像)	Li Luoer (李洛尔)	19	Beijing, China	B	A	C	C	Eliminated		45	30	32	35	3,046,577	36	43	1,854,769	Eliminated					43
Original Plan (原际画)	Lin Mo (林墨) ^{29}	19	Chongqing, China	A→B→A	B	A	A	A	A	9	9	6	6	13,990,221	5	8	10,806,994	9	9	4,334,075	6	13,700,082	6
Original Plan (原际画)	Yi Han (怿涵)	18	Beijing, China	C	A	F	Eliminated			43	48	52	62	1,400,284	Eliminated								62
Polar Bear Entertainment (北极熊文化)	Xiao Lihuan (肖力桓)	21	Sichuan, China	C	B	C	Eliminated			78	80	86	74	626,781	Eliminated								74
Prince Culture (普林赛斯)	Wu Yuheng (吴宇恒) ^{30}	25	Chengdu, China	C	A	A	B	B	B	16	16	13	14	9,412,096	17	16	7,659,034	18	19	2,000,953	18	1,829,783	18
Qigu Culture (齐鼓文化)	Xu Shaolan (徐绍岚)	18	Chongqing, China	B	A	C	C	Eliminated		64	54	48	48	2,126,282	53	52	286,303	Eliminated					52
RBW Entertainment	Hiroto Ikumi (井汲大翔) ^{31}	19	Osaka, Japan	B	A	B	B	B	B	29	29	18	17	6,895,112	15	12	8,856,294	14	14	3,441,630	15	5,477,202	15
RBW Entertainment	Jumpei Sumita (隅田隼平)	22	Tokyo, Japan	F	F	B	Eliminated			89	87	87	87	159,288	Eliminated								87
RBW Entertainment	Keiya Taguchi (田口馨也) ^{31}	18	Gunma, Japan	F	B	F	Eliminated			87	85	79	78	415,243	Eliminated								78
Revive (天王星娱乐)	Amu Hanyuda (羽生田挙武) ^{32}	23	Tokyo, Japan	B	F	B	B	B	B	40	32	26	27	4,008,131	30	24	5,271,024	24	24	1,585,282	24	441,526	24
Rock Sound Media (石声传媒)	Andy Shamray (安迪) / (Андрей Шамрай)	24	Huliaipole, Ukraine	B	F	B	Eliminated			82	81	80	81	260,851	Eliminated								81
SDT Entertainment (SDT娱乐)	Dai Shaodong (代少冬) ^{28}	23	Liaoning, China	B→A→B	F	B	C	Eliminated		32	31	31	34	3,107,098	48	48	793,684	Eliminated					48
Soundnova Culture (声曜文化)	Lailai / Asuka Ichinose (一之濑飞鸟) ^{33}	20	Yokohama, Japan	F	F	F	B	Eliminated		24	25	28	32	3,456,699	49	50	455,850	Eliminated					50
Stardust Promotion (星尘事务所)	Eisho Sato (佐藤永翔)	17	Kanagawa, Japan	C	F	F	C	Eliminated		61	62	49	49	2,050,957	41	38	2,918,810	Eliminated					38
STF Entertainment	Li Zhengting (李政庭)	20	Chongqing, China	F	F	C	Eliminated			63	61	65	69	921,464	Eliminated								69
Superblazing Planet (超燃星球)	Akezhuli (阿克朱力)	18	Xinjiang, China	F	B	F	Eliminated			62	74	78	82	252,359	Eliminated								82
Superblazing Planet (超燃星球)	Gu Liulin (谷柳霖)	20	Henan, China	B	C	B	Eliminated			57	70	77	79	366,659	Eliminated								79
Superblazing Planet (超燃星球)	Li Tailong (李泰龙)	20	Henan, China	C	F	F	Eliminated			66	77	84	86	162,391	Eliminated								86
W8VES	Liu Zhang (刘彰) ^{34}	21	Zhuhai, China	B→F	B	B	B	B	B	20	13	16	13	9,565,832	18	15	7,940871	13	13	3,493,794	11	13,274,812	11
Wajijiwa Entertainment (哇唧唧哇娱乐)	Fu Sichao (付思超) ^{35}	21	Beijing, China	C	B	F	B	B	B	14	20	22	24	4,277,208	24	19	6,360,061	19	21	1,801,192	22	893,191	22
Wajijiwa Entertainment (哇唧唧哇娱乐)	Ren Yinpeng (任胤蓬) ^{35}	21	Chongqing, China	C	A	F	A	B	B	5	5	9	10	10,034,180	13	17	6,581,482	20	22	1,798,968	19	1,802,420	19
Wajijiwa Entertainment (哇唧唧哇娱乐)	Zhang Jiayuan (张嘉元) ^{35}	19	Yingkou, China	C	B	C	A	A	A	3	7	7	7	12,624,851	10	10	9,477,805	11	11	3,816,761	8	13,612,487	8
White Media (白色系)	Bo Yuan (伯远) ^{36}	28	Guizhou, China	A	B	A	B	A	B	46	36	20	18	6,375,096	7	9	10,075,053	10	12	3,812,396	7	13,651,294	7
Xiangxingli Culture (相星力文化)	Wang Zehao (王泽浩)	20	Changsha, China	B	C	C	Eliminated			86	88	89	89	124,907	Eliminated								89
Xinhua Beiyi Culture (新华贝易)	Liu Cong (刘聪) ^{16}	19	Guangdong, China	C	F	F	Eliminated			75	63	75	77	465,141	Eliminated								77
Xinhua Beiyi Culture (新华贝易)	Qu Boyu (屈柏宇) ^{16}	19	Sichuan, China	F	F	F	C	Eliminated		67	42	47	54	1,835,885	46	46	1,061346	Eliminated					46
Yiling Media (壹聆传媒)	Lai Yaoxiang (赖耀翔) ^{37}	23	Taipei, Taiwan	F	F	A	Eliminated			90	76	70	65	1,197,864	Eliminated								65
Yuxiao Media (聿潇传媒)	Gan Wangxing (甘望星) ^{24}	20	Hunan, China	C	C	C	B	A	B	19	14	11	12	9,794,669	9	11	9,459,262	16	15	2,999,737	14	7,469,378	14

== Evaluations ==
- Winning Team
- Center
- Most Voted Trainee

=== 1st Evaluations (Episodes 3.1 & 3.2) ===
Episode 3: 1st Evaluation Performance Stage
#	Song	Original Artist	Team Name	Team Members	Individual Votes	2nd Class Evaluation
1	As a Monster 《作为怪物》	Chris Lee & Wu Tsing-fong (李宇春 & 吳青峰)	The Dark Night Gave Me Black Eyes, But I Use Them to Look for the Light 《黑夜给了我黑色的眼睛，我却用它寻找光明》	Hu Yetao	114	A
1	As a Monster 《作为怪物》	Chris Lee & Wu Tsing-fong (李宇春 & 吳青峰)	The Dark Night Gave Me Black Eyes, But I Use Them to Look for the Light 《黑夜给了我黑色的眼睛，我却用它寻找光明》	Lu Dinghao	113	B
1	As a Monster 《作为怪物》	Chris Lee & Wu Tsing-fong (李宇春 & 吳青峰)	The Dark Night Gave Me Black Eyes, But I Use Them to Look for the Light 《黑夜给了我黑色的眼睛，我却用它寻找光明》	Li Peiyang	88	B
1	As a Monster 《作为怪物》	Chris Lee & Wu Tsing-fong (李宇春 & 吳青峰)	The Dark Night Gave Me Black Eyes, But I Use Them to Look for the Light 《黑夜给了我黑色的眼睛，我却用它寻找光明》	Xue Bayi	77	B
1	As a Monster 《作为怪物》	Chris Lee & Wu Tsing-fong (李宇春 & 吳青峰)	The Dark Night Gave Me Black Eyes, But I Use Them to Look for the Light 《黑夜给了我黑色的眼睛，我却用它寻找光明》	Keiya	67	B
1	As a Monster 《作为怪物》	Chris Lee & Wu Tsing-fong (李宇春 & 吳青峰)	The Dark Night Gave Me Black Eyes, But I Use Them to Look for the Light 《黑夜给了我黑色的眼睛，我却用它寻找光明》	Liu Zhang	62	B
1	As a Monster 《作为怪物》	Chris Lee & Wu Tsing-fong (李宇春 & 吳青峰)	The Dark Night Gave Me Black Eyes, But I Use Them to Look for the Light 《黑夜给了我黑色的眼睛，我却用它寻找光明》	Cao Zuo	31	B
1	Break the Cocoon 《破茧》	Angela Zhang (张韶涵)	Six New Class A Students 《六A新生》	Yu Yang	103	C
1	Break the Cocoon 《破茧》	Angela Zhang (张韶涵)	Six New Class A Students 《六A新生》	Gan Wangxing	84	C
1	Break the Cocoon 《破茧》	Angela Zhang (张韶涵)	Six New Class A Students 《六A新生》	Jing Long	75	C
1	Break the Cocoon 《破茧》	Angela Zhang (张韶涵)	Six New Class A Students 《六A新生》	Kazuma	75	C
1	Break the Cocoon 《破茧》	Angela Zhang (张韶涵)	Six New Class A Students 《六A新生》	Yuya	50	C
1	Break the Cocoon 《破茧》	Angela Zhang (张韶涵)	Six New Class A Students 《六A新生》	Nuo Yan	39	C
2	Football Gang 《超级冠军》	Lu Han (鹿晗)	《Who? Super Champion!》	He Yifan	82	F
2	Football Gang 《超级冠军》	Lu Han (鹿晗)	《Who? Super Champion!》	Li Zhengting	73	F
2	Football Gang 《超级冠军》	Lu Han (鹿晗)	《Who? Super Champion!》	Liu Cong	69	F
2	Football Gang 《超级冠军》	Lu Han (鹿晗)	《Who? Super Champion!》	Liu Yandongji	68	F
2	Football Gang 《超级冠军》	Lu Han (鹿晗)	《Who? Super Champion!》	Lailai	48	F
2	Football Gang 《超级冠军》	Lu Han (鹿晗)	《Who? Super Champion!》	Li Tailong	41	F
2	Football Gang 《超级冠军》	Lu Han (鹿晗)	《Who? Super Champion!》	Li Jiahao	32	F
2	LIT 《莲》	Lay Zhang (张艺兴)	Overlord of the Flower Islands 《海岛霸王花》	Yi Han	94	A
2	LIT 《莲》	Lay Zhang (张艺兴)	Overlord of the Flower Islands 《海岛霸王花》	Ren Yinpeng	94	A
2	LIT 《莲》	Lay Zhang (张艺兴)	Overlord of the Flower Islands 《海岛霸王花》	Rikimaru	88	A
2	LIT 《莲》	Lay Zhang (张艺兴)	Overlord of the Flower Islands 《海岛霸王花》	Luo Yan	91	A
2	LIT 《莲》	Lay Zhang (张艺兴)	Overlord of the Flower Islands 《海岛霸王花》	Liu Yu	87	A
2	LIT 《莲》	Lay Zhang (张艺兴)	Overlord of the Flower Islands 《海岛霸王花》	Li Luoer	43	A
2	LIT 《莲》	Lay Zhang (张艺兴)	Overlord of the Flower Islands 《海岛霸王花》	Xu Shaolan	32	A
3	《Butter-Fly》	Kōji Wada（和田光司） (Digimon Adventures OST)	We're the Chosen Kids 《被选召的孩子们》	Fu Sichao	106	B
3	《Butter-Fly》	Kōji Wada（和田光司） (Digimon Adventures OST)	We're the Chosen Kids 《被选召的孩子们》	Bo Yuan	102	B
3	《Butter-Fly》	Kōji Wada（和田光司） (Digimon Adventures OST)	We're the Chosen Kids 《被选召的孩子们》	David	71	B
3	《Butter-Fly》	Kōji Wada（和田光司） (Digimon Adventures OST)	We're the Chosen Kids 《被选召的孩子们》	Shingo	60	B
3	《Butter-Fly》	Kōji Wada（和田光司） (Digimon Adventures OST)	We're the Chosen Kids 《被选召的孩子们》	Yuu	57	B
3	《Butter-Fly》	Kōji Wada（和田光司） (Digimon Adventures OST)	We're the Chosen Kids 《被选召的孩子们》	Zhang Zhang	57	B
3	《Butter-Fly》	Kōji Wada（和田光司） (Digimon Adventures OST)	We're the Chosen Kids 《被选召的孩子们》	Wei Yujie	44	B
3	I Like to Rejoice With You 《我欢喜喜欢你》	Jiao Maiqi (焦迈奇)	Romantic Cabin 《浪漫小屋》	Dai Shaodong	84	F
3	I Like to Rejoice With You 《我欢喜喜欢你》	Jiao Maiqi (焦迈奇)	Romantic Cabin 《浪漫小屋》	Huang Kun	81	F
3	I Like to Rejoice With You 《我欢喜喜欢你》	Jiao Maiqi (焦迈奇)	Romantic Cabin 《浪漫小屋》	Rong Yao	70	F
3	I Like to Rejoice With You 《我欢喜喜欢你》	Jiao Maiqi (焦迈奇)	Romantic Cabin 《浪漫小屋》	Jiang Dunhao	65	F
3	I Like to Rejoice With You 《我欢喜喜欢你》	Jiao Maiqi (焦迈奇)	Romantic Cabin 《浪漫小屋》	Lai Yaoxiang	50	F
3	I Like to Rejoice With You 《我欢喜喜欢你》	Jiao Maiqi (焦迈奇)	Romantic Cabin 《浪漫小屋》	Andy	40	F
4	Girl 《 女孩 》	Wei Lian 韋禮安	Produce Camp College's F6 《创造营学院的F6》	Wu Yuheng	108	A
4	Girl 《 女孩 》	Wei Lian 韋禮安	Produce Camp College's F6 《创造营学院的F6》	Yu Gengyin	93	B
4	Girl 《 女孩 》	Wei Lian 韋禮安	Produce Camp College's F6 《创造营学院的F6》	Zhang Xinyao	86	B
4	Girl 《 女孩 》	Wei Lian 韋禮安	Produce Camp College's F6 《创造营学院的F6》	Ryo	61	B
4	Girl 《 女孩 》	Wei Lian 韋禮安	Produce Camp College's F6 《创造营学院的F6》	Xiao Lihuan	55	B
4	Girl 《 女孩 》	Wei Lian 韋禮安	Produce Camp College's F6 《创造营学院的F6》	Wu Hai	40	B
4	《 Yummy 》	Justin Bieber	《R2E》	Santa	98	C
4	《 Yummy 》	Justin Bieber	《R2E》	Nine	85	C
4	《 Yummy 》	Justin Bieber	《R2E》	Chen Ruifeng	82	C
4	《 Yummy 》	Justin Bieber	《R2E》	Fan Zhener	60	C
4	《 Yummy 》	Justin Bieber	《R2E》	Li Jiaxiang	59	C
4	《 Yummy 》	Justin Bieber	《R2E》	He Zhenyu	47	C
4	《 Yummy 》	Justin Bieber	《R2E》	Wang Zehao	26	C
5	《ME！》	Taylor Swift feat. Brendon Urie	《Real ME！》	Qu Boyu	75	F
5	《ME！》	Taylor Swift feat. Brendon Urie	《Real ME！》	Shao Mingming	65	F
5	《ME！》	Taylor Swift feat. Brendon Urie	《Real ME！》	Luke	62	F
5	《ME！》	Taylor Swift feat. Brendon Urie	《Real ME！》	Gui Shangqi	59	F
5	《ME！》	Taylor Swift feat. Brendon Urie	《Real ME！》	Lindow	51	F
5	《ME！》	Taylor Swift feat. Brendon Urie	《Real ME！》	Han Peiquan	40	F
5	Drunken Master 《醉拳》	Jackie Chan (成龙)	Nobody Knows My Name 《谁人不知我姓名》	Wei Ziyue	118	A
5	Drunken Master 《醉拳》	Jackie Chan (成龙)	Nobody Knows My Name 《谁人不知我姓名》	Mika	93	B
5	Drunken Master 《醉拳》	Jackie Chan (成龙)	Nobody Knows My Name 《谁人不知我姓名》	Qian Zhengyu	84	B
5	Drunken Master 《醉拳》	Jackie Chan (成龙)	Nobody Knows My Name 《谁人不知我姓名》	Lin Yuxiu	73	B
5	Drunken Master 《醉拳》	Jackie Chan (成龙)	Nobody Knows My Name 《谁人不知我姓名》	Akezhuli	65	B
5	Drunken Master 《醉拳》	Jackie Chan (成龙)	Nobody Knows My Name 《谁人不知我姓名》	He Yijun	62	B
5	Drunken Master 《醉拳》	Jackie Chan (成龙)	Nobody Knows My Name 《谁人不知我姓名》	Zeng Hanjiang	46	B
6	《Lover Boy 88》	Phum Viphurit & Higher Brothers	Progressive Boys 《进步男孩儿》	Hiroto	117	A
6	《Lover Boy 88》	Phum Viphurit & Higher Brothers	Progressive Boys 《进步男孩儿》	Zhang Jiayuan	110	B
6	《Lover Boy 88》	Phum Viphurit & Higher Brothers	Progressive Boys 《进步男孩儿》	Lin Mo	109	B
6	《Lover Boy 88》	Phum Viphurit & Higher Brothers	Progressive Boys 《进步男孩儿》	Zhang Xingte	88	B
6	《Lover Boy 88》	Phum Viphurit & Higher Brothers	Progressive Boys 《进步男孩儿》	Zhang Teng	82	B
6	《Lover Boy 88》	Phum Viphurit & Higher Brothers	Progressive Boys 《进步男孩儿》	Chen Junjie	72	B
6	《Radio》	Henry Lau	Dream Team 《梦之队》	Zhou Keyu	122	C
6	《Radio》	Henry Lau	Dream Team 《梦之队》	Oscar	115	C
6	《Radio》	Henry Lau	Dream Team 《梦之队》	Patrick	79	C
6	《Radio》	Henry Lau	Dream Team 《梦之队》	Caelan	67	C
6	《Radio》	Henry Lau	Dream Team 《梦之队》	Ling Xiao	63	C
6	《Radio》	Henry Lau	Dream Team 《梦之队》	Gu Liulin	39	C
7	Neon Dancing 《霓虹甜心》	Mosaic (马赛克)	Sweetheart Disco Dancers 《甜心迪斯科》	Eisho	89	F
7	Neon Dancing 《霓虹甜心》	Mosaic (马赛克)	Sweetheart Disco Dancers 《甜心迪斯科》	Ye Haoran	84	F
7	Neon Dancing 《霓虹甜心》	Mosaic (马赛克)	Sweetheart Disco Dancers 《甜心迪斯科》	Ichika	68	F
7	Neon Dancing 《霓虹甜心》	Mosaic (马赛克)	Sweetheart Disco Dancers 《甜心迪斯科》	Xu Shengzi	57	F
7	Neon Dancing 《霓虹甜心》	Mosaic (马赛克)	Sweetheart Disco Dancers 《甜心迪斯科》	Amu	43	F
7	Neon Dancing 《霓虹甜心》	Mosaic (马赛克)	Sweetheart Disco Dancers 《甜心迪斯科》	Jumpei	29	F
7	Are (Love) You Ready, I'm (Love Me) Ready? 《爱 You Ready, 爱我Ready》	Kong Yang (孔阳) (Fox Spirit Matchmaker OP1) (狐妖小红娘)	Sweetheart Bomber 《甜心轰炸机》	Wang Xiaochan	107	B
7	Are (Love) You Ready, I'm (Love Me) Ready? 《爱 You Ready, 爱我Ready》	Kong Yang (孔阳) (Fox Spirit Matchmaker OP1) (狐妖小红娘)	Sweetheart Bomber 《甜心轰炸机》	Xie Xingyang	91	B
7	Are (Love) You Ready, I'm (Love Me) Ready? 《爱 You Ready, 爱我Ready》	Kong Yang (孔阳) (Fox Spirit Matchmaker OP1) (狐妖小红娘)	Sweetheart Bomber 《甜心轰炸机》	Zheng Mingxin	86	B
7	Are (Love) You Ready, I'm (Love Me) Ready? 《爱 You Ready, 爱我Ready》	Kong Yang (孔阳) (Fox Spirit Matchmaker OP1) (狐妖小红娘)	Sweetheart Bomber 《甜心轰炸机》	Liu Tanghui	55	B
7	Are (Love) You Ready, I'm (Love Me) Ready? 《爱 You Ready, 爱我Ready》	Kong Yang (孔阳) (Fox Spirit Matchmaker OP1) (狐妖小红娘)	Sweetheart Bomber 《甜心轰炸机》	Li Zekun	38	B
7	Are (Love) You Ready, I'm (Love Me) Ready? 《爱 You Ready, 爱我Ready》	Kong Yang (孔阳) (Fox Spirit Matchmaker OP1) (狐妖小红娘)	Sweetheart Bomber 《甜心轰炸机》	Lelush	14	B

=== 2nd Evaluations (Episodes 6.1 & 6.2) ===
Episode 6: 2nd Evaluation Performance Stage							
#	Position	Song	Original Artist	Team Name	Team Members	Individual Votes	Total votes
1	Dance	《Believer》	Imagine Dragons	Plan A 《A計劃》	Dai Shaodong	102	624
1	Dance	《Believer》	Imagine Dragons	Plan A 《A計劃》	Han Peiqian	117	624
1	Dance	《Believer》	Imagine Dragons	Plan A 《A計劃》	Hu Yetao	132	624
1	Dance	《Believer》	Imagine Dragons	Plan A 《A計劃》	Zhang Xinyao	133	624
1	Dance	《Believer》	Imagine Dragons	Plan A 《A計劃》	Zhou Keyu	140	624
2	Vocal	《Lemon》	Kenshi Yonezu	We Are In Vain 《我们白著呢》	Ye Haoran	79	413
2	Vocal	《Lemon》	Kenshi Yonezu	We Are In Vain 《我们白著呢》	Nuo Yan	24	413
2	Vocal	《Lemon》	Kenshi Yonezu	We Are In Vain 《我们白著呢》	Wei Ziyue	132	413
2	Vocal	《Lemon》	Kenshi Yonezu	We Are In Vain 《我们白著呢》	He Yijun	70	413
2	Vocal	《Lemon》	Kenshi Yonezu	We Are In Vain 《我们白著呢》	Lailai	108	413
3	Dance	The Whale Incarnates Inside the Isolated Island 《化身孤島的鯨》	Zhou Shen (周深)	Five Whales From An Isolated Island 《五条来自孤岛的鲸》	Liu Yu	160	557
3	Dance	The Whale Incarnates Inside the Isolated Island 《化身孤島的鯨》	Zhou Shen (周深)	Five Whales From An Isolated Island 《五条来自孤岛的鲸》	Qu Boyu	88	557
3	Dance	The Whale Incarnates Inside the Isolated Island 《化身孤島的鯨》	Zhou Shen (周深)	Five Whales From An Isolated Island 《五条来自孤岛的鲸》	Xue Bayi	136	557
3	Dance	The Whale Incarnates Inside the Isolated Island 《化身孤島的鯨》	Zhou Shen (周深)	Five Whales From An Isolated Island 《五条来自孤岛的鲸》	Zhang Zhang	43	557
3	Dance	The Whale Incarnates Inside the Isolated Island 《化身孤島的鯨》	Zhou Shen (周深)	Five Whales From An Isolated Island 《五条来自孤岛的鲸》	Eisho	130	557
4	Dance	Love Birds 《爱情鸟》	Lin Yilun (林依轮)	Love Birds 《爱情鸟》	Fan Zhener	64	503
4	Dance	Love Birds 《爱情鸟》	Lin Yilun (林依轮)	Love Birds 《爱情鸟》	He Zhenyu	79	503
4	Dance	Love Birds 《爱情鸟》	Lin Yilun (林依轮)	Love Birds 《爱情鸟》	Huang Kun	111	503
4	Dance	Love Birds 《爱情鸟》	Lin Yilun (林依轮)	Love Birds 《爱情鸟》	Jiang Dunhao	78	503
4	Dance	Love Birds 《爱情鸟》	Lin Yilun (林依轮)	Love Birds 《爱情鸟》	Caelan	171	503
5	Composition (Rap)	High-peaked Item 《峰项》	Unreleased original rap	Six More (People) to Form a Group 《差六个成团》	Zeng Hanjiang	141	768
5	Composition (Rap)	High-peaked Item 《峰项》	Unreleased original rap	Six More (People) to Form a Group 《差六个成团》	Lin Mo	166	768
5	Composition (Rap)	High-peaked Item 《峰项》	Unreleased original rap	Six More (People) to Form a Group 《差六个成团》	Liu Zhang	174	768
5	Composition (Rap)	High-peaked Item 《峰项》	Unreleased original rap	Six More (People) to Form a Group 《差六个成团》	Luo Yan	150	768
5	Composition (Rap)	High-peaked Item 《峰项》	Unreleased original rap	Six More (People) to Form a Group 《差六个成团》	Oscar	137	768
6	Composition (Song)	《Fix Me》	Unreleased original song	Healing Treasure Box 《疗伤百宝箱》	Lu Dinghao	107	486
6	Composition (Song)	《Fix Me》	Unreleased original song	Healing Treasure Box 《疗伤百宝箱》	Li Luoer	62	486
6	Composition (Song)	《Fix Me》	Unreleased original song	Healing Treasure Box 《疗伤百宝箱》	Fu Sichao	126	486
6	Composition (Song)	《Fix Me》	Unreleased original song	Healing Treasure Box 《疗伤百宝箱》	Rong Yao	69	486
6	Composition (Song)	《Fix Me》	Unreleased original song	Healing Treasure Box 《疗伤百宝箱》	Yu Yang	122	486
7	Vocal	I Don't Care 《我管你》	Hua Chenyu (华晨宇)	What Do You Care About Me Team 《你管我什么队》	Jing Long	109	579
7	Vocal	I Don't Care 《我管你》	Hua Chenyu (华晨宇)	What Do You Care About Me Team 《你管我什么队》	Bo Yuan	165	579
7	Vocal	I Don't Care 《我管你》	Hua Chenyu (华晨宇)	What Do You Care About Me Team 《你管我什么队》	Wu Yuheng	133	579
7	Vocal	I Don't Care 《我管你》	Hua Chenyu (华晨宇)	What Do You Care About Me Team 《你管我什么队》	Gan Wangxing	135	579
7	Vocal	I Don't Care 《我管你》	Hua Chenyu (华晨宇)	What Do You Care About Me Team 《你管我什么队》	Shao Mingming	37	579
8	Dance	《Therefore I Am》	Billie Eilish	Welcome to Our Amusement Park 《欢迎来到我们的游乐园》	Zhang Jiayuan	165	735
8	Dance	《Therefore I Am》	Billie Eilish	Welcome to Our Amusement Park 《欢迎来到我们的游乐园》	Lelush	142	735
8	Dance	《Therefore I Am》	Billie Eilish	Welcome to Our Amusement Park 《欢迎来到我们的游乐园》	Xie Xingyang	147	735
8	Dance	《Therefore I Am》	Billie Eilish	Welcome to Our Amusement Park 《欢迎来到我们的游乐园》	Hiroto	163	735
8	Dance	《Therefore I Am》	Billie Eilish	Welcome to Our Amusement Park 《欢迎来到我们的游乐园》	Zhang Teng	118	735
9	Composition (Dance)	《Joker》^{1}	Lay Zhang (张艺兴)	《Five C》	Wu Hai	157	692
9	Composition (Dance)	《Joker》^{1}	Lay Zhang (张艺兴)	《Five C》	Rikimaru	153	692
9	Composition (Dance)	《Joker》^{1}	Lay Zhang (张艺兴)	《Five C》	Santa	164	692
9	Composition (Dance)	《Joker》^{1}	Lay Zhang (张艺兴)	《Five C》	Ren Yinpeng	107	692
9	Composition (Dance)	《Joker》^{1}	Lay Zhang (张艺兴)	《Five C》	Xu Shaolan	111	692
10	Dance	Snatched by a Crab Claw (Crab Dance) (ปูหนีบอีปิ) 《被螃蟹钳了一下下》	Pornchantaphon Fitmuan (พร จันทพร พอดีม่วน)	Yangchang Lake's Gods of War 《阳澄湖战神》	He Yifan	105	522
10	Dance	Snatched by a Crab Claw (Crab Dance) (ปูหนีบอีปิ) 《被螃蟹钳了一下下》	Pornchantaphon Fitmuan (พร จันทพร พอดีม่วน)	Yangchang Lake's Gods of War 《阳澄湖战神》	Ichika	149	522
10	Dance	Snatched by a Crab Claw (Crab Dance) (ปูหนีบอีปิ) 《被螃蟹钳了一下下》	Pornchantaphon Fitmuan (พร จันทพร พอดีม่วน)	Yangchang Lake's Gods of War 《阳澄湖战神》	Wang Xiaochen	75	522
10	Dance	Snatched by a Crab Claw (Crab Dance) (ปูหนีบอีปิ) 《被螃蟹钳了一下下》	Pornchantaphon Fitmuan (พร จันทพร พอดีม่วน)	Yangchang Lake's Gods of War 《阳澄湖战神》	Amu	156	522
10	Dance	Snatched by a Crab Claw (Crab Dance) (ปูหนีบอีปิ) 《被螃蟹钳了一下下》	Pornchantaphon Fitmuan (พร จันทพร พอดีม่วน)	Yangchang Lake's Gods of War 《阳澄湖战神》	Gui Shangqi	37	522
11	Vocal	You Better Not Think About Me 《你就不要想起我 》	Hebe Tien (田馥甄)	You Have to Remember Us Team 《你们真的记得我们队对》	Yu Gengyin	145	759
11	Vocal	You Better Not Think About Me 《你就不要想起我 》	Hebe Tien (田馥甄)	You Have to Remember Us Team 《你们真的记得我们队对》	Mika	150	759
11	Vocal	You Better Not Think About Me 《你就不要想起我 》	Hebe Tien (田馥甄)	You Have to Remember Us Team 《你们真的记得我们队对》	Patrick	156	759
11	Vocal	You Better Not Think About Me 《你就不要想起我 》	Hebe Tien (田馥甄)	You Have to Remember Us Team 《你们真的记得我们队对》	Zhang Xingte	134	759
11	Vocal	You Better Not Think About Me 《你就不要想起我 》	Hebe Tien (田馥甄)	You Have to Remember Us Team 《你们真的记得我们队对》	Nine	174	759

Note

1. For Original Composition (Dance) Group, the trainees from 《Five C》 were the one who created an "original choreography" using the song 《Joker》 of Lay Zhang.

=== 3rd Evaluations (Episodes 8) ===
Episode 8: 3rd Evaluation Performance Stage
#	Song	Guest Performers	Team Name	Team Members	Individual Votes	Average Votes
1	Encode "Cute" and Press Five 《输入法可爱按第五》	Ju Jingyi (鞠婧祎)	Encode Us and Act Cute 《输入我们 打出可爱》	Mika	163	153.5
1	Encode "Cute" and Press Five 《输入法可爱按第五》	Ju Jingyi (鞠婧祎)	Encode Us and Act Cute 《输入我们 打出可爱》	Nine	200	153.5
1	Encode "Cute" and Press Five 《输入法可爱按第五》	Ju Jingyi (鞠婧祎)	Encode Us and Act Cute 《输入我们 打出可爱》	Wu Yuheng	156	153.5
1	Encode "Cute" and Press Five 《输入法可爱按第五》	Ju Jingyi (鞠婧祎)	Encode Us and Act Cute 《输入我们 打出可爱》	Xue Bayi	133	153.5
1	Encode "Cute" and Press Five 《输入法可爱按第五》	Ju Jingyi (鞠婧祎)	Encode Us and Act Cute 《输入我们 打出可爱》	Zhang Xingte	139	153.5
1	Encode "Cute" and Press Five 《输入法可爱按第五》	Ju Jingyi (鞠婧祎)	Encode Us and Act Cute 《输入我们 打出可爱》	Zheng Hanjiang	130	153.5
2	《Nana Party》	Mao Xiaotong (毛晓彤)	The Summer Becomes Sweet With You 《夏日炎炎 有你真甜》	Fu Sichao	148	129.33
2	《Nana Party》	Mao Xiaotong (毛晓彤)	The Summer Becomes Sweet With You 《夏日炎炎 有你真甜》	Jing Long	72	129.33
2	《Nana Party》	Mao Xiaotong (毛晓彤)	The Summer Becomes Sweet With You 《夏日炎炎 有你真甜》	Santa	163	129.33
2	《Nana Party》	Mao Xiaotong (毛晓彤)	The Summer Becomes Sweet With You 《夏日炎炎 有你真甜》	Wei Ziyue	118	129.33
2	《Nana Party》	Mao Xiaotong (毛晓彤)	The Summer Becomes Sweet With You 《夏日炎炎 有你真甜》	Xie Xingyang	152	129.33
2	《Nana Party》	Mao Xiaotong (毛晓彤)	The Summer Becomes Sweet With You 《夏日炎炎 有你真甜》	Zhang Teng	123	129.33
3	Satellite XL 《卫星XL》	Amber Liu (刘逸云)	Planet 666 《六六六星球》	Caelan	142	126.8
3	Satellite XL 《卫星XL》	Amber Liu (刘逸云)	Planet 666 《六六六星球》	Hiroto	108	126.8
3	Satellite XL 《卫星XL》	Amber Liu (刘逸云)	Planet 666 《六六六星球》	Hu Yetao	148	126.8
3	Satellite XL 《卫星XL》	Amber Liu (刘逸云)	Planet 666 《六六六星球》	Rong Yao	101	126.8
3	Satellite XL 《卫星XL》	Amber Liu (刘逸云)	Planet 666 《六六六星球》	Yu Genyin	135	126.8
4	Adventure Plan 《冒险计划》	Meng Meiqi (孟美岐)	The Big Adventurers 《大冒险家》	Amu	135	111.5
4	Adventure Plan 《冒险计划》	Meng Meiqi (孟美岐)	The Big Adventurers 《大冒险家》	Bo Yuan	141	111.5
4	Adventure Plan 《冒险计划》	Meng Meiqi (孟美岐)	The Big Adventurers 《大冒险家》	Liu Yu	96	111.5
4	Adventure Plan 《冒险计划》	Meng Meiqi (孟美岐)	The Big Adventurers 《大冒险家》	Wu Hai	150	111.5
4	Adventure Plan 《冒险计划》	Meng Meiqi (孟美岐)	The Big Adventurers 《大冒险家》	Zhang Xinyao	147	111.5
5	Jade 《 璧 》	Liu Xiening (刘些宁)	The Necessary (Team) 《必须的(队）》	Liu Zhang	147	106.7
5	Jade 《 璧 》	Liu Xiening (刘些宁)	The Necessary (Team) 《必须的(队）》	Oscar	97	106.7
5	Jade 《 璧 》	Liu Xiening (刘些宁)	The Necessary (Team) 《必须的(队）》	Patrick	140	106.7
5	Jade 《 璧 》	Liu Xiening (刘些宁)	The Necessary (Team) 《必须的(队）》	Rikimaru	136	106.7
5	Jade 《 璧 》	Liu Xiening (刘些宁)	The Necessary (Team) 《必须的(队）》	Zhang Jiayuan	118	106.7
5	Jade 《 璧 》	Liu Xiening (刘些宁)	The Necessary (Team) 《必须的(队）》	Zhou Keyu	109	106.7
6	It's Raining, I'm Thinking of You 《下雨了是我在想你》	Nene / Zheng Naixin (郑乃馨)	If You're Insincere, Do Not Disturb 《灰诚勿扰》	Gan Wangxing	95	101
6	It's Raining, I'm Thinking of You 《下雨了是我在想你》	Nene / Zheng Naixin (郑乃馨)	If You're Insincere, Do Not Disturb 《灰诚勿扰》	He Yifan	110	101
6	It's Raining, I'm Thinking of You 《下雨了是我在想你》	Nene / Zheng Naixin (郑乃馨)	If You're Insincere, Do Not Disturb 《灰诚勿扰》	Lelush	161	101
6	It's Raining, I'm Thinking of You 《下雨了是我在想你》	Nene / Zheng Naixin (郑乃馨)	If You're Insincere, Do Not Disturb 《灰诚勿扰》	Lin Mo	177	101
6	It's Raining, I'm Thinking of You 《下雨了是我在想你》	Nene / Zheng Naixin (郑乃馨)	If You're Insincere, Do Not Disturb 《灰诚勿扰》	Ren Yinpeng	63	101

=== Final Performance ===
Episode 10: Final Performance Stage
#	Song title	Producer	Members
1	《 Be Mine 》		Mika
1	《 Be Mine 》		Caelan
1	《 Be Mine 》		Lin Mo
1	《 Be Mine 》		Lelush
1	《 Be Mine 》		Zhang Jiayuan
1	《 Be Mine 》		Xue Bayi
1	《 Be Mine 》		Wu Yuheng
1	《 Be Mine 》		Fu Sichao
2	《 Definition 》		Bo Yuan
2	《 Definition 》		Hiroto
2	《 Definition 》		Gan Wangxing
2	《 Definition 》		Zhang Xingte
2	《 Definition 》		Zhang Xinyao
2	《 Definition 》		Ren Yinpeng
2	《 Definition 》		Amu
2	《 Definition 》		Yu Gengyin
2	《 Definition 》		Hu Yetao
3	《We Are The Youth, We Are The Future 》		Liu Yu
3	《We Are The Youth, We Are The Future 》		Santa
3	《We Are The Youth, We Are The Future 》		Rikimaru
3	《We Are The Youth, We Are The Future 》		Patrick
3	《We Are The Youth, We Are The Future 》		Nine
3	《We Are The Youth, We Are The Future 》		Zhou Keyu
3	《We Are The Youth, We Are The Future 》		Liu Zhang
3	《We Are The Youth, We Are The Future 》		Oscar

Solo Performances
Team	Team Members	Song	Original Artist
Vocal Group A	Wu Yuheng	A Word of Love 《爱就一个字》	Jeff Chang
Vocal Group A	Zhang Xingte	The Chaos After You 《如果雨之后》	Eric Chou
Vocal Group A	Gan Wangxing	MaMa and PaPa 《爸爸妈妈》	Li Ronghao
Vocal Group A	Fu Sichao	A Normal Child 《普通的孩子》	Fu Sichao
Vocal Group A	Caelan	Together Again 《再一起》	Yu Jiayun
Vocal Group A	Zhang Jiayuan	The Ocean of Universe 《宇宙海》	Zhang Jiayuan
Vocal Group A	Yu Gengyin	《他不懂》	Jason Zhang
Vocal Group A	Nine	Sun 《太阳》	PikA
Dance Group	Patrick	Bad and Boujee	Migos
Dance Group	Ren Yinpeng	Make a Wish (English Ver.)	Nct U
Dance Group	Lin Mo	Everything I Wanted	Billie Eilish
Dance Group	Hu Yetao	Ugly Beauty 《怪美的》	Jolin Tsai
Dance Group	Hiroto	Fun	Pitbull ft. Chris Brown
Dance Group	Oscar	Monster	Shawn Mendes, Justin Bieber
Dance Group	Zhang Xinyao	Carbonyl	
Dance Group	Santa	Farewell	Yu Yang
Dance Group	Rikimaru	Bum Bum Tam Tam	MC Fioti
Dance Group	Liu Yu	《关山酒》	Xiao Hun
Vocal Group B	Amu	Legend of Hungry Wolf 《餓狼傳說》	Jacky Cheung
Vocal Group B	Xue Bayi	Matriarchy 《母系社会》	aMEI
Vocal Group B	Liu Zhang	《穿越时空的信》	Liu Zhang
Vocal Group B	Mika	Flower	Johny Stimson
Vocal Group B	Lelush	Jackpot	Mr Lambo
Vocal Group B	Zhou Keyu	JULY	Kris Wu
Vocal Group B	Bo Yuan	Pop	NSYNC

=== Notes ===
- ^{1}Caelan Moriarty, Kazuma Horikawa Mitchell and Mika Hashizume are members of Japanese-American boy group INTERSECTION based in Japan.
- ^{2}Rikimaru Chikada and Santa Uno are members of Japanese-Chinese boy group WARP’s UP. They were both previously active as professional dancers and choreographers.
- ^{3}Xie Xingyang acted in the drama The Birth of The Drama King.
- ^{4}Liu Yu was the runner-up of survival show The Chinese Youth and was also in the cast of Dear Lord Herbal.
- ^{5}Gui Shangqi, Li Zekun and Li Jiahao are members of JULY LAB.
- ^{6}Ichika Uehara is the elder brother of Jun Uehara.
  He acted in the drama Dolmen X and the film Momi’s House.
- ^{7}Li Jiaxiang was a contestant of survival show The Next Top Bang.
  He was also a regular cast of sport variety show Super Penguin League.
- ^{8}Nuo Yan was an e-Sports player of King of Glory and won in the tournaments 2019 KPL Spring Championship and 2019 KCC World Champions Cup.
- ^{9}Huang Kun was a contestant of Handsome Youth Society.
  He was also a participant of the music variety shows The Coming One (season 1) and Sing or Spin.
- ^{10}Jiang Dunhao won in the inaugural season of Sing! China, a rebranded version of The Voice of China, a show based on the original The Voice of Holland.
  He was also a participant in Let’s Band Together.
- ^{11}Xue Bayi acted in the film A Stranger in Shanghai.
- ^{12}He Yifan and Yu Gengyin are former members of SWIN and its sub-unit SWIN-S.
- ^{13}Shingo Kadowaki is a former member of Japan musical theater troupe Troupe $4.50.
- ^{14}Wei Ziyue was a contestant of the South Korean survival show Produce X 101.
- ^{15}He Yifan, Wei Ziyue and Lin Yuxiu were contestants of All for One.
- ^{16}Oscar, Liu Tanghui, He Yijun, Liu Cong and Qu Boyu was contestants of We are Young.
- ^{17}Ling Xiao participated in choreography for 1MILLION Dance Studio in South Korea.
- ^{18}Yuya Tsuzuki is a former member of the Nagoya boy group #HASHTAG.
- ^{19}Zhang Teng and Zhang Xingte are soloists.
- ^{20}Nine is a member of Thai boy group OXQ. He acted in the Thai series 2 Moons 2.
- ^{21}Patrick acted in the Thai series The Gifted: Graduation.
- ^{22}Zhou Keyu is a member of BEST.
- ^{23}Zhang Xinyao was a contestant on the dance competition show Street Dance of China (season 3).
- ^{24}Zhang Xingte, Zhang Xinyao, Jing Long, Lelush, Han Peiquan, Hu Yetao and Gan Wanxing are influencers famous on the platform TikTok.
- ^{25}Lu Dinghao was a contestant on the survival show Idol Producer.
- ^{26}Xie Xingyang and Lu Dinghao were in the cast of Hello, My Youth.
- ^{27}Shao Mingming is a regular cast member of the variety shows Detective School, Grade One Freshman, Great Escape and Fresh Sunday.
- ^{28}Wang Xiaochen and Dai Shaodong were contestants of the survival show Produce Camp 2019.
  Wang Xiaochen ranked 75th and was eliminated in the first round; Dai Shaodong ranked 35th and was eliminated in the third round.
- ^{29}Lin Mo is a member of Yi’an Music Club.
- ^{30}Wu Yuheng was a participant of the music variety show The Coming One (season 2) and Beauty Youth Academy.
  He was also in the cast of the drama A Girl Like Me.
- ^{31}Hiroto Ikumi and Keiya Taguchi were contestants of the Japanese survival show Produce 101 Japan.
- ^{32}Amu Hanyuda is a former member of Johnny’s Jr. boy group's ANTIME.
- ^{33}Shao Mingming and Lailai appeared on the talk-variety show Informal Talks.
  Shao Mingming was a co-host in season 2 on episodes 15-16, and Lailai has been a representative of Japan from season 4.
- ^{34}Liu Zhang was a contestant on Rap for Youth under his stage name AK.
- ^{35}Fu Sichao, Ren Yipeng and Zhang Jiayuan were contestants of the music survival The Coming One: SUPER BAND and formed their band Milky Way during this show.
- ^{36}Bo Yuan was a contestant on survival show Youth With You. Aftermath, he also member of ZERO-G.
- ^{37}Lai Yaoxiang was a former member of Taiwanese dance cover group AOD.
- ^{38}Kazuma left the show after episode 4 due to family issues.
