= Keep Running season 11 =

2023 season of Chinese television series

Keep Running
- Season 11
- Poster for Season 11

Release
- Original network: ZRTG: Zhejiang Television
- Original release: 14 April – 21 July 2023

Season chronology
- ← Previous; Let's Build a Better Life Next → Nature Season

This is a list of episodes of the Chinese variety show Keep Running in season 11. The show airs on ZRTG: Zhejiang Television. The new season welcomed a new member: Fan Chengcheng and the return of a member: Song Yuqi.

== Episodes ==
List of episodes (episode 144-155)
(Series) Episode #	(Season) Episode #	Broadcast Date	Guest(s)	Landmark	Teams	Mission	Results
0	11/00 (Note: This is the trailer of the 11/01 episode.)	14 April 2023	Han Geng, Zhang Jingyi, Wu Dajing & Su Xing	Jinsha Site Museum, Chengdu, Sichuan	Team 1: (Zheng Kai, Bai Lu, Song Yuqi, Han Geng); Team 2: (Sha Yi, Angelababy, Wu Dajing, Su Xing); Team 3: (Li Chen, Zhang Jingyi, Fan Chengcheng, Zhou Shen)	Correctly identify the Sun Bird Ornament artifact and corresponding poem based on the messages brought by five videos.	Team 1 and 2 Win. Team 1 and 2 become the God Bird Team. Team 3 becomes the Chasing Team.
144	11/01	21 April 2023	Han Geng, Zhang Jingyi, Wu Dajing & Su Xing	Chengdu, Sichuan	God Bird Team: (Zheng Kai, Bai Lu, Song Yuqi, Han Geng, Sha Yi, Angelababy, Wu Dajing, Su Xing); Chasing Team: (Li Chen, Zhang Jingyi, Fan Chengcheng, Zhou Shen)	God Bird Team: Light up four bird parts and a sun part of the totem prop. Chasing Team: Chase and catch all the members of the God Bird Team.	Chasing Team Wins. Chasing Team each receives a box of Sun Bird Ornament pure gold.
145	11/02	28 April 2023	Victor Ma, Chen Zheyuan & Zhang Dada	Chengdu, Sichuan	Hearts Team: (Victor Ma, Song Yuqi, Sha Yi, Bai Lu, Chen Zheyuan); Spades Team: (Li Chen, Zheng Kai, Fan Chengcheng); Jokers Team: (Angelababy [Big Joker], Zhang Dada & Zhou Shen [Small Jokers])	Win more diamonds for better rewards. At the poker game, each player takes turns to become King. The King appoints a Queen and a Jack from the other players. The King and Queen each selects a direction card from two direction cards respectively. The Jack will select one of the two direction cards to play it and to move the piece a grid towards the direction of the destination of the team grids on the chessboard. Each players can also veto the King, Queen and Jack altogether for once. After being vetoed, the vetoed King has to appoint a new King. The veto only takes effect when there are at least two players exercising it.	Hearts Team Wins. Hearts Team each receives gold beans exchanged with their diamonds.
146	11/03 (Note: Angelababy did not participate in the filming of this episode.)	5 May 2023	Jike Junyi, Guan Xiaotong & Zhang Yishan	Chengdu, Sichuan	No teams. All members are "Mirror Person".	Win more chances to identify "Mirror Person" and "Person". "Mirror Person" completes tasks to become "Person". "Mirror Person" rips the nameplates of "Person" to exchange identity and vice versa. "Mirror Person" also eliminates themselves by ripping the nameplates of other "Mirror Person". "Person" survives by tearing the nametags of other "Person" to eliminate them and become the only "Person" at the end.	Zheng Kai Wins. Zheng Kai breaks the mirror to lift its spell and receives a mini golden mirror.
147	11/04 (Note: Angelababy and Song Yuqi did not participate in the filming of this episode.) (Note: Special host appearance by Lin Jieni in the concert of this episode.)	12 May 2023	Into1 (Liu Yu, Bo Yuan, Rikimaru, Mika, Nine, Lin Mo, Patrick, Zhou Keyu, Santa, Zhang Jiayuan & Liu Zhang)	Guiyang, Guizhou	Brothers Team (Li Chen, Zheng Kai, Sha Yi, Bai Lu, Zhou Shen, Fan Chengcheng); Into1 Team (Liu Yu, Bo Yuan, Rikimaru, Mika, Nine, Lin Mo, Patrick, Zhou Keyu, Santa, Zhang Jiayuan, Liu Zhang)	Correctly rank the top 5 songs according to survey of Guizhou people.	Draw. Both Brothers Team and Into1 Team have 5 lead singers respectively for the final song namely.
148	11/05	19 May 2023	Nie Yuan, Meng Jia & Huang Xiaoyun	Qianling Mountain Park, Guiyang, Guizhou	No initial teams. (Zhou Shen, Nie Yuan, and Huang Xiaoyun compete for the title of "Guiyang Destination Officer")	Complete game challenges to earn "Guiyang Tourist Attraction Recommendation Officer" credentials while the rest of the brothers secretly execute a hidden mission honoring Zhou Shen.	Zhou Shen Wins. Zhou Shen officially earns the title of "Guiyang Destination Officer".
149	11/06	26 May 2023	Fiona Sit, Li Yunrui, Zhang Ruonan & Neo Hou	Duyun Film & TV Town, Duyun, Guizhou	Envoy/Assassin Camp (Includes hidden assassin "Jingke"); Royal Guard Camp (Includes hidden "Guard Chief")	Through high-stakes psychological choices and physical tasks, the Envoy Camp must successfully manipulate team shuffles to match the hidden Assassin "Jingke" into the final round with the Guard Chief.	Envoy Camp Wins. The Assassin successfully matches with the Guard Chief during the midnight banquet.
150	11/07	2 June 2023	29 Youth Sports Guests (including Xu Mengjie, Jiuwei, Nene, Baolan, etc.)	Hangzhou, Zhejiang	7 Clubs representing each MC member: Team Li Chen, Team Angelababy, Team Zheng Kai, Team Sha Yi, Team Bai Lu, Team Zhou Shen, Team Fan Chengcheng	Compete across sports clusters including "Dance Ball Throwing", "Teeter-Totter Hockey", and progressive multi-player rope pulling to claim the highest Asian Games Support Value.	Team Zheng Kai Wins. Zheng Kai's club secures the top prize supporting the upcoming Hangzhou Asian Games.
151	11/08	9 June 2023	Huang Yi, Ray Ma, Zhang Weili, Meng Ziyi & Jiang Yiyi	Xinchang, Zhejiang	Pairs consisting of: Folklore Characters & accompanying Spirit Companions	Gather ideological components across local landmarks mentioned in Li Bai's historical poem to patch missing seals on a magical scroll, concluding in a blindfolded nameplate-ripping combat.	Spirit Team Wins. Multiple spirit companions successfully achieve total human form after surviving the combat arena against Zhang Weili.
152	11/09	16 June 2023	Wei Daxun & Zhang Linghe	Yanji, Yanbian Korean Autonomous Prefecture, Jilin	No initial fixed teams.	Participate in the "Who Can Peacefully Enter Dreamland Race" by engaging in a binary psychological choice matrix to collect R-coins for purchasing essential bedroom amenities.	Wei Daxun & Zheng Kai Win. Both successfully obtain maximum comfort setups and secure top tier sleep spaces.
153	11/10	23 June 2023	Wei Daxun, Patrick Shih, Xu Hongzhi & Sun Zhenni	In-studio / Mudflat Arena	Split between 2 competing Ginseng Chicken Soup Brands	Locate secret indicators of high-grade ginseng ingredients via a speed-drawing memorization relay and standard mud flat face-exposure matches.	Brand A Team Wins. Team successfully locks down the ultimate hidden prize formula.
154	11/11	14 July 2023 (Note: The episode was delayed for two weeks due to post-production adjustments following a featured guest's scandal.)	Dylan Wang & Minnie (Note: Regular cast member Song Yuqi fully returned starting this episode. A featured guest's presence was entirely edited out of the broadcast using digital removal techniques.)	Ancient City (Muang Boran), Samut Prakan, Thailand	Varying Team Formations per round	Put on traditional Thai attire to explore the Ancient City museum and complete pool-jumping and local tracking assignments.	Brothers Team Wins. The cast successfully bypasses individual traps to secure the initial set of keys for the final treasure box.
155	11/12	21 July 2023	Dylan Wang & Sunnee (Note: A featured guest's appearance was completely omitted from the final broadcast due to post-production adjustments.)	Pattaya & Bangkok, Thailand	Pairs consisting of: Li Chen & Zhou Shen, Angelababy & Fan Chengcheng, Zheng Kai & Sha Yi, Dylan Wang & White, White & Sunnee	Change into traditional Thai student school uniforms to complete high-intensity navigation and number-sum alignment puzzle missions.	Li Chen, Angelababy, Sha Yi, Bai Lu, Fan Chengcheng & Dylan Wang Win. The winning alliance successfully achieves a total score match to claim the custom elephant-themed gold awards.
