= Oscar Wang (singer) =

Oscar Wang 王政熊
- Also known as: OZ, Oscar, 奥斯卡
- Born: July 30, 1998 (age 28); São Paulo, Brazil
- Occupations: Singer, actor
- Years active: 2020–present
- Label: RYCE Entertainment

Oscar Wang (Chinese: 王政熊; born July 7, 1998), also known as Oscar (Chinese: 奥斯卡), Oz, or Øzcar Wang, is a Chinese singer and dancer. Born in Brazil and a native of Chengdu, Sichuan province, he was trained at Cube Entertainment in Korea for three years. In 2020 and 2021, he gained popularity by participating under the name Oscar in the Youku idol group casting show We Are Young (Chinese: 少年之名) and in the Tencent Video idol group casting show Chuang 2021 (Chinese: 创造营2021). In August 2022 he signed with Ryce Entertainment.

== Career ==
In June 2020, he participated in the Youku idol group casting show We Are Young, and successfully advanced to the finals in August, ranking 19th.

In January 2021, he participated in the Tencent Video International idol group casting show Chuang 2021, and also successfully advanced to the finals, and finally ranked 13th, but failed to form a group.

On January 11, 2022, he released his first mini-album ME, MYSELF & I.

In August 2022 he signed with Ryce Entertainment and gave himself the new stage name OZ.

In January 2023, he released his album FEELINGS.

=== We Are Young ===
Competition information
Round	Rank	Notes
3rd Round	12	
4th Round	17	
7th Round	19	394,192 voting points
8th Round	15	
9th Round	19	622,736 voting points

=== Chuang 2021 ===
- Entering debut group rankings are in bold.

Competition information
Round	Rank	Change	Voting Points	Group	Notes
2nd Round	**10**		not announced	A → C → B → A → A → B	
3rd Round	**10**	▬	not announced	A → C → B → A → A → B	
4th Round	**10**	▬	not announced	A → C → B → A → A → B	
5th Round	**11**	▼1	10,007,720	A → C → B → A → A → B	
6th Round	**11**	▬	not announced	A → C → B → A → A → B	
7th Round	**5**	▲7	12,336,864	A → C → B → A → A → B	
8th Round	17	▼12	not announced	A → C → B → A → A → B	
9th Round	17	▬	2,854,135	A → C → B → A → A → B	
10th Round 1st half	**11**	▲7	not announced	A → C → B → A → A → B	
10th Round 2nd half	12	▼1	not announced	A → C → B → A → A → B	
10th Round Final Results	13	▼1	12,230,067	A → C → B → A → A → B	failed to form group

== Discography ==
=== Albums ===
Year	Date	Title	Notes
2022	01/11	《ME, MYSELF & I》	Mini Album
2023	01/16	《Feelings》	

=== Singles ===
Year	Date	Title	Lyrics	Composer	Notes
2020	07/30	《Vroom》	Oscar Wang	Oscar Wang	first original single
2021	07/30	《Move Up》	Oscar Wang	Oscar Wang Rick Bridges DEEVAN	
2021	10/26	《Slow Down》	Oscar Wang/RayJade	Oscar Wang /RayJade	
2021	11/15	《带你到》	Oscar Wang	SOOVA	
2021	11/16	《Journey》	Oscar Wang	ColderrDXL	
2022	01/11	《Material Life (欲望)》	Oscar Wang/Xiao Qidao	Oscar Wang/Xiao Qidao	
2022	01/28	《你只管向前 (Go Ahead)》			
2022	10/28	《Fire》	Oscar Wang	Oscar Wang	
2022	11/03	《She》	Oscar Wang/Brite Ma	Oscar Wang	
2022	11/15	《Anna》	Oscar Wang	Oscar Wang	
2023	01/16	《Feelings》			
2023	01/16	《Pay Back》			
2023	01/16	《Too Much》			
2023	01/16	《Run Away》			
2023	01/16	《Wake》			
2023	01/16	《他是过的每一步 (One Way)》			
2023	01/16	《Over.》			
2023	08/26	《Kill the Stage》			Collab. with 未來星B3Rich
2024	06/07	《Cupid》	Oscar Wang/AnsrJ	Oscar Wang/AnsrJ	feat. ANSRJ
2024	10/24	《Life25》	Oscar Wang	Oscar Wang	feat. KKECHO

=== 《Chuang 2021》Performances ===
Date	Song information	Notes
2021/02/17	《鹰》: Song Description: Preliminary Rating Stage (Team); Original singer: Zhang Yixing; Collaborators: Liu Yandong, Zhang Zhang, Cao Zuo	Phase 1
2021/02/17	《I'm The One》: Song Description: Preliminary Rating Stage (Solo); Singer: Oscar	Phase 1
2021/02/17	《清唱Rap》: Song Description: Preliminary Rating Stage (Battle Session); Singer: Oscar	Phase 1
2021/03/6	《Radio》: Song description: group competition song; Original Singer: Henry; Collaborating singers: Zhou Keyu, Qing Lian, Yin Haoyu, Ling Xiao, Gu Liulin	Phase 3
2021/03/10	《我们一起闯》: Song Description: The official theme song of the show; Original Song; Collaborators: All students	Chinese version
2021/03/10	《Chuang To-Gather Go！》: Song Description: The official theme song of the show; Original Song; Collaborators: All students	English version
2021/03/28	《峰顶》: Song Description: Position Assessment Song; Original Rap; Collaborators: Zeng Hanjiang, Lin Mo, Luo Yan, Liu Zhang (AK)	Phase 6
2021/04/12	《璧》: Song description: Original song theme performance; Original Song; Collaborating singers: Rikimaru, Zhou Keyu, Liu Zhang, Yin Haoyu, Zhang Jiayuan; Helping Senior: Liu Xiening (Hard Candy Girl 303)	Phase 8
2021/04/24	《少年的模样》: Song Description: Final Stage; Original Song; Collaborating singers: Rikimaru, Zhou Keyu, Liu Zhang, Yin Haoyu, Gao Qingchen, Liu Yu, Santa	Phase 10

== Television shows ==
Date	Network	Title	Notes
2020/06/26 - 08/28	Youku	《We Are Young》	Contestant (19th place in the end)
2021/02/17 - 04/24	Tencent-Video	《Chuang 2021》	Contestant (13th place in the end)
2021/02/25 - 04/29	Tencent-Video	《Chuang 2021: Are You a Werewolf?》	Ep. 2, 9
2021/04/20	Hunan TV	《Happy Camp》	Special live broadcast as Chuang 2021 trainee
2021/05/21	Golden Eagle Cartoon	《Crazy Magic》	Chinese:《疯狂的麦咭》 S8, Ep. 6
2021/07/10 - 08/14	Golden Eagle Cartoon	《爸爸带你闯一夏》	
2021/09/02	Tencent Video	《Girls Like Us 》	Chinese:《黑怕女孩》Ep. 8
2021/09/07 - 10/28	Tencent Video	《大有可为的我》	Ep. 7-9
2021/11/19 - 11/21	Tencent Video	《Super Novae Games 2021 S4》	Chinese:《超新星运动会S4》
2021/11/26 - 12/25	Shanghai Dragon Television	《Best Stage》	Chinese: 《最好的舞台秋日限定》
2022/01/09	Shanghai Dragon Television	《Flash Cafe》	Ep. 27
2022/09/10 - 10/09	Tencent-Video	《Wonderland Junior》	Chinese: 《桃花坞开放中》
2022/12/17	Shanghai Dragon Television	《Flash Cafe Live》Best Stage EP5	Chinese: 《闪电咖啡馆live》Best Stage EP5
2023/07/29 - 2023/08/24	Tencent Video	《舞台2023》The Next	Ep.1-5
2023/10/14	Hunan Satellite TV	《你好, 星期六》Hello, Saturday	
2024/08/13	Tencent Video	《Super Novae Games 2024 S5》	《超新星运动会S5》

== Other ventures ==
=== Endorsements ===
Year	Brand	Product	Notes
2021	GIVENCHY	Lipstick, Liquid Foundation	
2021	Aalok	UVC touchless smart disinfection box	
2021	兰蔻LANCOME	Makeup, Essence	
2021	KOSE高丝黑糖精	Cream	Brand Ambassador
2021	le coq sportif 乐卡克	Clothing, Shoes	

=== Magazine ===
Year	Publication date	Name	Notes
2021	05/27	时尚先生fine电子刊	
2021	06/05	XBlush Magazine	
2021	06/15	时装L'OFFICIEL电子刊	
2021	07/01	OK!精彩	
2021	07/01	芭莎男士 BAZAAR MEN	
2021	08/01	费加罗 Figaro madame	

== Events ==
Year	Date	Name	Venue	Notes
2021	05/21	Kappa Sports Fashion Show	Beijing	1st show in China
