= Produce Camp 2021 =

2021 Chinese boy group competition show

- Promotional poster, with the animated trainees
- Also known as: CHUANG 2021

Chinese name
- Traditional Chinese: 創造營 2021
- Simplified Chinese: 创造营 2021
Transcriptions
Standard Mandarin
- Hanyu Pinyin: Chuàngzàoyíng Èrlíng èryī
- Genre: Reality, Survival Competition
- Created by: CJ E&M
- Developed by: Tencent
- Presented by: Deng Chao
- Starring: Ning Jing; Amber Liu; Zhou Shen Zhou Zhennan; Nene/Zheng Naixin
- Judges: "Citizen Producers" (Viewers)
- Announcer: 何雁南 (pinyin: Hé Yànnán)
- Ending theme: 《我们一起闯》(pinyin: Wǒmen yīqǐ chuǎng; lit. 'Let's Venture Forth Together') (Chuang To-Gather Go!)
- Country of origin: China
- Original languages: Chinese; Mandarin
- No. of episodes: 10 (see list)

Production
- Production location: Hainan Island
- Camera setup: Multi-camera
- Running time: 139–292 minutes 268 minutes (finale)
- Production companies: Hao Feng Qingyun; CJ E&M; Tencent Penguin Pictures

Original release
- Network: Tencent Video
- Release: February 17 – April 24, 2021

Related
- Produce 101; Produce 101 China; Produce Camp 2019; Produce Camp 2020; Produce Camp Asia: Thailand

Produce Camp 2021 (Chinese: 创造营2021; pinyin: Chuàngzàoyíng Èrlíng èryī), officially known as CHUANG 2021, is the fourth season of Produce 101 China, a Chinese idol survival show. The show brought 90 male trainees from different countries and agencies, to form an 11-member international boy group through global viewers' votes. The final 11 trainees debuted as INTO1.

It premiered on February 17, the show was broadcast on Tencent Video and WeTV every Wednesday and Saturday at 7pm CST (UTC+8) (Note: On most of the weeks, episodes will only be released on Saturdays.), with subtitles available in several languages. The grand finale was streamed live on 24 April 2021 at Tencent Video and WeTV.

== Background ==
Produce Camp 2021 held a global audition and had gathered 90 trainees who are accepting several challenges to fight for a spot in the newest boyband in mainland China. One of the trainees, Kazuma, left the show for personal reasons. To foster their skills and talents, the trainees underwent missions, training, and assessments with the guidance of the six mentors. The show was filmed in Hainan Island and the recording started in January 2021. The first week had a double stream of episodes on Wednesday and Saturday, resuming in its regular timeslot on the later episodes. In the end, 11 trainees will be chosen to form a group.

== Production style ==
In August 2020, Tencent Video released an annual press conference, announcing the launching of "Produce Camp 2021" recruiting trainees worldwide. It was first rumored that the fourth season will be a co-ed of male and female trainees, but the official Sina Weibo account rejected the rumor.

Tencent Videos released a Produce Camp game pixel style logo on January 1, 2021, and later reveal the logo with its slogan "冒险岛的召唤" or "Call of Adventure Islands".

== Mentors ==
=== Main mentors ===
In October 2020, Tencent Video announced that it would create its fourth season of its Produce China series, with Deng Chao as the nation's producer. In January 2021, Tencent Videos announced five new additional mentors: Zhou Shen, Amber Liu, Ning Jing, Zhou Zhennan of R1SE, and Nene/Zheng Naixin of BonBon Girls 303 as international assistant.

Name	Age	Role	Notes
Deng Chao	42	Nation's Producer	Chinese actor, comedian, director and singer.
Ning Jing	48	Audience Representative	Chinese actress and singer
Zhou Shen	28	Vocal Mentor	Chinese singer
Amber Liu	28	Rap and Dance Mentor	Member of f(x)
Zhou Zhennan	20	Rap and Dance Mentor	Center and Leader of R1SE; winning member from Produce Camp 2019
Nene / Zheng Naixin (Pornnappan Pornpenpipat)	23	International Assistant	Member of BonBon Girls 303; winning member from Produce Camp 2020

=== Guest mentors ===
Name	Age	Appearance on the Show	Notes
Kōki / Mitsuki Kimura	17	Episode 3.1-3.2	Japanese model and songwriter
Gong Jun	28	Episode 8	Actor

=== Guest performers ===
Name	Age	Appearance on the Show	Notes
Ju Jingyi	26	Episode 8	Actress and singer
Liu Xiening	24	Episode 8	Member of BonBon Girls 303; winning member from Produce Camp 2020
Meng Meiqi	22	Episode 8	Member of Rocket Girls 101; winning member from Produce 101 China
Mao Xiaotong	33	Episode 8	Actress and dancer
Jackson Wang	27	Episode 10	Member of Got7
R1SE	N/A	Episode 3.2,10	Produce Camp 2019 debut boy group
BonBon Girls 303	N/A	Episode 10	Produce Camp 2020 debut girl group

== Episodes ==
=== Episode 1.1 (February 17, 2021) ===
Ninety trainees from Mainland China, Taiwan, Hong Kong, and some parts across the globe, including Japan, the United States, Thailand, Russia, and Ukraine, are gathered to test their fate and talents be part of the newest boyband in Mainland China. Companies introduce trainees before the six mentors go inside the gathered hall. Unlike in the Korean counterpart, the trainees are seated according to their comfort without any rank numbers in their seat. The audition show started with the mentors' performance: Ning Jing performing 《Julia》, Amber Liu performing 《Shake That Brass》, Zhou Shen performing 《自己按门铃自己听》, Zhou Zhennan performing 《C》, and Deng Chao performing Produce Camp 2019's theme song 《喊出我的名字》. In addition, a new set of rules is imposed to the show; the mentors have no longer the power to decide the trainees' rankings. For the first time, in every seat of the trainees and the mentors, a voting device was installed on their seats and each ranking results are jointly decided by the trainees and the mentors. After the mentors' performances, contestants perform with their label mates or a pre-made group to be evaluated from grades A, B, C, and F. After the Jaywalk Newjoy's performance, it was later revealed that the debuting group will consist of 11 members. It was also revealed that the first Class A students were Zhou Keyu, Oscar, and Lin Mo. The episode was cut when Santa was fatigued after his individual performance while being treated by the medical experts on the show.

=== Episode 1.2 (February 20, 2021) ===
The evaluations continued on the next day when Santa was fully-recovered. Everyone watched the taped performance of Santa and Rikumaru once more for everyone to evaluate the both of them. Santa received a perfect score from the joint votes of the mentors and trainees. Halfway through the show, another set of Class A students was revealed, and the current Class A students, Zhou Keyu, Oscar, and Lin Mo were demoted to Class B because they are outvoted from the recent trainees who performed. Seven were named as the new members of Class A, namely Yu Yang, Li Jiaxiang, Santa, Rikimaru, Hu Yetao, Bo Yuan, and Yu Gengyin. The episode ended with the intense special dance battle between Santa, Liu Yu, and Xue Bayi, with Liu Yu's rank being not revealed in the episode.

=== Episode 2 (February 27, 2021) ===
Three more performances were evaluated before revealing who will be occupying the final 11 in Class A. None of the current Class A students were demoted while Liu Yu and Han Peiquan claimed the 8th and 9th spots on the Class A. The 10th and 11th spots were battled between Lin Mo, Hiroto, and Dai Shaodong. In the end, it was Dai Shaodong and Lin Mo who occupied the remaining Class A seats, while Hiroto retained as a Class B trainee. Deng Chao announced that there would be a battle between the recommended students of the five mentors (Deng Chao, Ning Jing, Zhou Shen, Amber Liu, and Zhou Zhennan) versus the opponent from Class A which the recommended students chose. If the recommended students fail the challenge, they will be directly demoted to Class F, and if the recommended trainees succeeded, they will go into Class A, and the mentioned opponent will be demoted to Class B. After all trainees were evaluated, they moved to their dorms and chose the bedrooms according to their likings, yet it is a first-come, first-served basis. The episode ended as Zhou Zhennan introduced the 14 songs that are up for grabs for the upcoming 1st evaluations. The trainees can pick their desired song according to their rank, and each song has a certain limit of team members. The centers are not yet decided, but there are three guidelines on how to choose it: (1) if there's only one Class A student in a group, that trainee will automatically be the center of that group; (2) if there are more than one Class A trainees in one song, the selection of center will be decided by the members through voting; (3) if there are no Class A trainees in a team, the center will be decided by all the team members through voting.

BATTLE ROUND
Mentor	Recommended Student	Result	Initial Class	Final Class	Class A Opponent	Result	Initial Class	Final Class
Zhou Zhennan	Oscar	Won	B	A	Dai Shaodong	Lost	A	B
Amber Liu	Liu Zhang	Lost	B	F	Yu Yang	Won	A	A
Zhou Shen	Zhou Keyu	Lost	B	F	Yu Gengyin	Won	A	A
Deng Chao	Patrick / Yin Haoyu	Lost	B	F	Li Jiaxiang	Won	A	A
Ning Jing	Mika	Lost	B	F	Bo Yuan	Won	A	A

Below is the initial class of the 90 trainees:

INITIAL CLASS EVALUATIONS
A	B	C	F
1. Santa; 2. Bo Yuan; 3. Li Jiaxiang; 4. Rikimaru; 5. Han Peiquan; 6. Hu Yetao; 7. Yu Gengyin; 8. Liu Yu; 9. Yu Yang; 10. Lin Mo; 11. Oscar	1. Dai Shaodong; 2. Hiroto; 3. Andy; 4. Zhang Xingte; 5. Jing Long; 6. Luo Yan; 7. Shingo; 8. Ichika; 9. Gu Liulin; 10. Zeng Hanjiang; 11. Nine; 12. Wu Hai; 13. Xu Shaolan; 14. Xu Shengzi; 15. Ryo; 16. Caelan; 17. Amu; 18. Hu Zhenyu; 19. Li Luoer; 20. Wang Zehao	1. Wei Ziyue; 2. Eisho; 3. Kazuma; 4. Zhang Teng; 5. Huang Kun; 6. Rong Yao; 7. Zhang Xinyao; 8. Chen Ruifeng; 9. He Yifan; 10. Ren Yinpeng; 11. Shao Mingming; 12. Wu Yuheng; 13. Zhang Jiayuan; 14. Liu Cong; 15. Xue Bayi; 16. Xiao Lihuan; 17. Ling Xiao; 18. Yuya; 19. Gan Wangxing; 20. David; 21. Fan Zhener; 22. Luke; 23. Chen Junjie; 24. Liu Yandongji; 25. Li Jiahao; 26. Li Tailong; 27. Fu Sichao; 28. Nuo Yan; 29. Yuu; 30. Yi Han	1. Zhou Keyu; 2. Mika; 3. Liu Zhang; 4. Patrick; 5. Keiya; 6. Ye Haoran; 7. Lailai; 8. Zhang Zhang; 9. Wang Xiaochen; 10. Wei Yujie; 11. Cao Zuo; 12. Jiang Dunhao; 13. Li Zhengting; 14. Jumpei; 15. Lin Yuxiu; 16. Lindow; 17. Li Peiyang; 18. Akezhuli; 19. Lai Yaoxiang; 20. He Yijun; 21. Lu Dinghao; 22. Qian Zhengyu; 23. Zheng Mingxin; 24. Lelush; 25. Qu Boyu; 26. Gui Shangqi; 27. Li Zekun; 28. Liu Tanghui; 29. Xie Xingyang

=== Episode 3.1 (March 03, 2021) ===
The trainees are facing a new mission on their 1st public evaluation stage battle as it determines their new class as a trainee. The team with the highest votes in this public performance will automatically be the new Class A students. Despite feeling the pressure of the challenge, the trainees still have time to get together and do recreational activities on the beach to unwind and relax. Trainees are threatened by the teams《莲 / LIT》 and 《Yummy》, as they see these two groups as the strongest groups. An activity was conducted to decide which groups will battle with another group. The group that will face PK are as follows: (1) 《超级冠军 / Football Gang》 vs《莲 / LIT》; (2) 《Lover Boy 88》 vs 《Radio》; (3) 《女孩 / Girl》 vs 《Yummy》; (4) 《ME!》 vs 《醉拳 / Drunken Master》; (5) 《霓虹甜心 / Neon Dancing》 vs《爱you ready, 爱你ready / Are (Love) You Ready, I'm (Love Me) Ready?》; (6) 《作为怪物 / As a Monster》 vs 《破茧 / Break the Cocoon》; and (7) 《Butter-Fly》 vs 《我欢喜喜欢你 / I Joyfully Like You》. Three battles had already performed, with 《作为怪物 / As a Monster》,《莲 / LIT》, and 《Butter-Fly》 being hailed as the winners of their respective battles.

=== Episode 3.2 (March 06, 2021) ===
Four pairs of performances are waiting to be disclosed before knowing the votes they received on the 1st stage evaluations and their new class evaluations. The teams who performed 《女孩 / Girl》, 《醉拳 / Drunken Master》, 《Lover Boy 88》, and爱you ready, 爱你ready / Are (Love) You Ready, I'm (Love Me) Ready?》 won on their respective battles. The team 《LIT》, composed of Rikimaru, Liu Yu, Ren Yinpeng, Yi Han, Li Luoer, Luo Yan, and Xu Shaolan are hailed to be the most voted group among the 14 performances and they all automatically become the new members in Class A. Deng Chao also revealed the top 4 trainees among the winning teams who have the most individual votes cast for them will be also joining as the new members of Class A, Wei Ziyue (118 points), Hiroto (117 points), Hu Yetao (114 points), and Wu Yuheng (108 points). A surprise stage performance was performed by their seniors R1SE that was revealed they will also be demonstrating the choreography of this season's theme song.

=== Episode 4.1 (March 12, 2021) ===
After the 1st Public Evaluations Stage, R1SE performed the Chinese lyrics of this year's theme song 《我们一起闯》 while Amber Liu performed the English lyrics 《Chuang, To-Gather, Go!》. All trainees were shocked to hear that they would be required to memorize the choreography and learn both the Chinese and English lyrics of the song. Many of the trainees struggle with the languages they are fluent in and the challenge to memorize everything in a short period of time. All 90 trainees are evaluated by the mentors and there are drastic changes among the trainees' new class. Rikimaru, Liu Yu, Wu Yuheng, and Hu Yetao who were previously evaluated as Class A in the 1st Public Evaluations Stage have retained their ranks in which the mentors gave them high remarks in maintaining their grade. Lai Yaoxiang who was evaluated as Class F back-to-back had risen to Class A. One were named as the new members of Class A, namely Patrick/Yin Haoyu among the new set of Class A students, Liu Yu was voted to become the center of the music video. Liu Yu vowed that he will break the center curse since in the Produce China series, all of the centers in the music videos didn't end up in the debuting group.

=== Episode 4.2 (March 12, 2021) ===
The trainees were asked to do a rearrangement of the official theme song by interpreting it in their own preferred styles and perform it. This task was given as an opportunity to the trainees to show their talent and potential and appeal to the audience. Trainees are free to choose members to make a team with a minimum of 5 people and a maximum of 11 people. Less than a week, the trainees performed in the presence of the national producer, Deng Chao and mentors are Ning Jing, Zhou Shen, and Amber Liu.

#	Name groups	Theme performances	Contestants
1	Galaxy Travelers	This is the Place We've been in Our Dreams (Band performance)	Fu Sichao, Huang Kun, Lin Mo, Liu Zhang, Ichika, Zhang Jiayuan, Zhang Teng
2	Gourd King Kong	Gourd King Kong (Dance performance)	Fan Zhener, Gui Shangqi, Li Jiahao, Ling Xiao, Luo Yan, Wu Hai, Xu Shaolan
3	Gourd Bros	Elec-chuang-nic (Mix traditional-modern performance)	Nine, Li Luoer, Liu Yu, Shao Mingming, Wang Xiaochen, Wei Yujie, Xue Bayi
4	Lion with Wings	Let's break in together (International New Year Edition)	Bo Yuan, Yuya, Hiroto, Lai Yaoxiang, Ryo, Amu, Eisho, Zhang Zhang
5	Handsome Boys	Dream (R&B vocal performance)	Wu Yuheng, Zheng Hanjiang, He Yifan, Mika, Li Jiaxiang, Zhang Xingte, Lin Yuxiu (invited host)
6	Friends	Friends (Band and dance performance)	Oscar, Kazuma, Hu Yetao, Rikimaru, Caelan, Patrick, Yu Yang, Santa, Zhou Keyu
7	ROSE Trending Topic	Just Go Where You Want (Stage-act dance performance)	Chen Ruifeng, Han Peiquan, Lu Dinghao, Qu Boyu, Xie Xingyang, Yu Gengyin, Zhang Xinyao
8	Red	Let's break in together (Japanese version)	Lindow, Shingo, Keiya, Yuu, Jumpei
9	Surprise	Don't Dare You! Be a Team (Stage-act dance performance)	Akezhuli, David, Gu Liulin, Liu Tanghui, Li Zhengting, Wei Ziyue
9	The Voice of Goose Island	Song A Goose (Mash-up all theme song of Produce 101 China and Produce Camp series)	Dai Shaodong, Gan Wangxing, He Zhenyu, Jiang Dunhao, Jing Long, Nuo Yan, Ren Yipeng, Rong Yao, Lailai
10	KPL.SEXY	Different Guys (Sexy dance performance)	Cao Zuo, Luke, Liu Yandongji, Li Zekun, Qian Zhengyu, Xiao Lihuan
11	Player	The Geese Broke in Together (Dance performance)	Chen Junjie, Liu Cong, Li Peiyang, Li Tailong, Wang Zehao, Xu Shengzi, Yi Han, Ye Haoran, Zheng Mingxin
(not participants)			Andy, He Yijun, Lelush

=== Episode 5 (March 20, 2021) ===
Before starting the announcement of the first elimination, trainees are interviewed by the media. The first elimination round took place, Liu Yu from BiuBiu Culture ranked 1st place, while He Yijun from Jaywalk Newjoy ranked 55th. Those ranked 56th-90th were eliminated. With the most shocking elimination being Lai Yaoxiang who managed to go from F class to A class.

=== Episode 6.1 (March 27, 2021) ===
After the first elimination, 60 trainees entered the 2nd Public Evaluation Stage. This evaluation stage is divided into three professional directions is Dance, Vocal and Composition. Trainees watch all professional direction assessment performance track demo video and fill in their professional direction assessment of the first, second and third volunteer, forming 5 dance teams 《Believer》, 《化身孤島的鯨 / The Whale Incarnates Inside the Isolated Island》,《爱情鸟 / Love Birds》, 《Therefore, I Am》 and 《被螃蟹钳了一下下 (ปูหนีบอีปิ) / Crab Dance》; 3 vocal bands 《Lemon》, 《我管你 / I Don't Care》 and《你就不要想起我 / You Better Not Think About Me》; and 3 composition teams (each of them presented the vocal team rearranging song, dance team making choreography, and rap team writing lyrics and composing song) of 11 teams. Each group is limited to five places, and if the excess is excluded according to the ranking, the lower ranked participants will be transferred to the second or third volunteer. The first part of the 2nd Evaluation Performance Stage took place are 《Believer》, 《Lemon》, 《化身孤島的鯨 / The Whale Incarnates Inside the Isolated Island》,《爱情鸟 / Love Birds》, and 《峰项 / Highed-peak Item》 composition rap team. The last episode 6 part 1, 《峰项 / Highed-peak Item》 team while still remaining in the position of Best Performance on the 2nd Evaluation.

=== Episode 6.2 (March 28, 2021) ===
The second part of the 2nd Evaluation Performance Stage took place are 《Fix Me》 composition vocal team, 《我管你 / I Don't Care》, 《Therefore, I Am》, 《Joker》 composition dance team, 《被螃蟹钳了一下下 (ปูหนีบอีปิ) / Crab Dance》 and《你就不要想起我 / You Better Not Think About Me》. At the end of the 2nd Public Evaluation Stage, Deng Chao also revealed 《峰项 / Highed-peak Item》 team is the Best Performance. Meanwhile, the Best MVPs are Liu Zhang from 《峰项 / Highed-peak Item》 team, and Nine from《你就不要想起我 / You Better Not Think About Me》 team with the same total votes is 174 points.

=== Episode 7 (April 03, 2021) ===
The trainees had their Inside Part Sports festival. In this festival, lead host by mentor Zhou Shen and co-host from trainees are Shao Mingming, Han Peiquan, Nine and Qu Boyu. Teams were formed based on class, led by mentors Zhou Zhennan (A), Amber Liu (B) and Nene (C). The second elimination round took place, Zhou Keyu from Jaywalk Newjoy ranked 1st place, while independent trainee Jing Long ranked 33rd. Those ranked 34th-55th were eliminated.

=== Episode 8 (April 10, 2021) ===
After the second elimination, 33 trainees entered the 3rd Public Evaluation Stage. The evaluation stage is revealed to be a concept evaluation. Trainees listen to the demos of six original songs and watch all professionally-directed assessment performance track demo videos. For each original song, viewers chose one trainee to be center using a week-long online poll. The centers are Mika《输入法可爱按第五 / Encode "Cute" and Press Five》, Santa 《Nana Party》, Caelan《卫星XL / Satellite XL》, Liu Yu 《冒险计划 / Adventure Plan》, Rikimaru 《璧 / Jade》 and Lin Mo 《下雨了是我在想你 / It's Raining, I'm Thinking of You》. The remaining trainees can choose songs based on the last ranking. The mentors announces that there will be six female idol seniors joining in the performances and each team tries to guess who they are. Before getting into the core of 3rd Evaluation Performance Stage, the 《峰项 / Highed-peak Item》 team, the Best Performance team from last evaluation, performs a special stage. Because the teammate Luo Yan was eliminated, his position was replaced by the other Best MVP, Nine, and they performed Happy by Pharrell Williams. The guest female idol seniors are announced to be Ju Jingyi with Mika team, Mao Xiaotong with Santa team, Amber Liu with Caelan team, Meng Meiqi with Liu Yu team, Liu Xiening with RIkimaru team, and Nene with Lin Mo team. At the end of the 2nd Public Evaluation Stage, Deng Chao revealed that 《输入法可爱按第五 / Encode "Cute" and Press Five》 team won and the Best MVP is Nine, with a total of 200 points.

== Elimination chart ==
Color key

Final members of INTO1
Contestants eliminated in the final episode
Contestants eliminated in the third elimination round
Contestants eliminated in the second elimination round
Contestants eliminated in the first elimination round
Contestants left the show

90 Contestants
Liu Yu (刘宇)	Santa (赞多)	Rikimaru (力丸)	Mika (米卡)	Nine (高卿尘)
Lin Mo (林墨)	Bo Yuan (伯远)	Zhang Jiayuan (张嘉元)	Patrick (尹浩宇)	Zhou Keyu (周柯宇)
Liu Zhang (刘彰)	Caelan (庆怜)	Oscar (奥斯卡) (王政熊)	Gan Wangxing (甘望星)	Hiroto (井汲大翔)
Zhang Xingte (张星特)	Lelush (利路修)	Wu Yuheng (吴宇恒)	Ren Yinpeng (任胤蓬)	Zhang Xinyao (张欣尧)
Yu Gengyin (俞更寅)	Fu Sichao (付思超)	Hu Yetao (胡烨韬)	Amu (羽生田挙武)	Xue Bayi (薛八一)
Jing Long (井胧)	Zeng Hanjiang (曾涵江)	Xie Xingyang (谢兴阳)	Wu Hai (吴海)	He Yifan (何屹繁)
Wei Ziyue (魏子越)	Zhang Teng (张腾)	Rong Yao (荣耀)	Gui Shangqi (贵尚奇)	Ichika (上原一翔)
Nuo Yan (諾言)	Luo Yan (罗言)	Eisho (佐藤永翔)	Ye Haoran (叶皓然)	Han Peiquan (韩佩泉)
Lu Dinghao (陸定昊)	Shao Mingming (邵明明)	Li Luoer (李洛尔)	Yu Yang (于洋)	Wang Xiaochen (王孝辰)
Qu Boyu (屈柏宇)	Jiang Dunhao (蒋敦豪)	Dai Shaodong (代少冬)	Huang Kun (黄鲲)	Lailai (一之濑飞鸟)
He Zhenyu (何圳煜)	Xu Shaolan (徐绍岚)	He Yijun (何懿峻)	Zhang Zhang (张璋)	Fan Zhener (范臻尔)
David (大卫)	Li Zekun (李泽坤)	Lin Yuxiu (林煜修)	Li Jiahao (李家豪)	Yuya (都筑雄哉)
Liu Tanghui (刘唐辉)	Yi Han (怿涵)	Yuu (喜内優心)	Li Jiaxiang (李嘉祥)	Lai Yaoxiang (赖耀翔)
Cao Zuo (曹左)	Ling Xiao (凌箫)	Li Peiyang (李沛洋)	Li Zhengting (李政庭)	Shingo (门胁慎刚)
Lindow (林豆)	Ryo (原部凌)	Chen Junjie (陈俊洁)	Xiao Lihuan (肖力桓)	Liu Yandongji (刘严冬季)
Zheng Mingxin (郑明鑫)	Liu Cong (刘聪)	Keiya (田口馨也)	Gu Liulin (谷柳霖)	Wei Yujie (韦语节)
Andy (安迪)	Akezhuli (阿克朱力)	Qian Zhengyu (钱政宇)	Luke (卢克)	Chen Ruifeng (陈瑞丰)
Li Tailong (李泰龙)	Jumpei (隅田隼平)	Xu Shengzi (徐圣兹)	Wang Zehao (王泽浩)	Kazuma (和马)

== Ranking ==
New Top 11

Rank	Episode 2	Episode 3	Episode 4	Episode 5	Episode 6	Episode 7	Episode 8	Episode 9	Episode 10-Phase 1	Episode 10-Phase 2	Episode 10-Finals
1	Mika	Mika =	Liu Yu ↑5	Liu Yu =	Liu Yu =	Zhou Keyu ↑1	Liu Yu ↑3	Liu Yu =	Liu Yu =	Rikimaru ↑1	Liu Yu ↑1
2	Zhou Keyu	Santa ↑2	Santa =	Santa =	Zhou Keyu ↑3	Santa ↑2	Santa =	Santa =	Rikimaru ↑2	Liu Yu ↓1	Santa ↑2
3	Zhang Jiayuan	Zhou Keyu ↓1	Mika ↓2	Rikimaru ↑1	Rikimaru =	Rikimaru =	Mika ↑3	Mika =	Mika =	Mika =	Rikimaru ↓2
4	Santa	Kazuma ↑2	Rikimaru ↑4	Mika ↓1	Santa ↓2	Liu Yu ↓3	Rikimaru ↓1	Rikimaru =	Santa ↓2	Santa =	Mika ↓1
5	Ren Yinpeng	Ren Yinpeng =	Zhou Keyu ↓2	Zhou Keyu =	Lin Mo ↑1	Oscar ↑6	Patrick ↑2	Patrick =	Bo Yuan ↑7	Bo Yuan =	Nine ↑2
6	Kazuma	Liu Yu ↑1	Lin Mo ↑3	Lin Mo =	Mika ↓2	Mika =	Caelan ↑7	Caelan =	Lin Mo ↑3	Lin Mo =	Lin Mo =
7	Liu Yu	Zhang Jiayuan ↓4	Zhang Jiayuan =	Zhang Jiayuan =	Bo Yuan ↑11	Patrick ↑1	Zhou keyu ↓6	Nine ↑1	Nine =	Nine =	Bo Yuan ↓2
8	Rikimaru	Rikimaru =	Caelan ↑3	Caelan =	Patrick ↑1	Lin Mo ↓3	Nine ↑6	Zhou Keyu ↓1	Caelan ↓2	Zhang Jiayuan ↑2	Zhang Jiayuan =
9	Lin Mo	Lin Mo =	Ren Yinpeng ↓4	Patrick ↑3	Gan Wangxing ↑4	Bo Yuan ↓2	Lin Mo ↓1	Lin Mo =	Zhou Keyu ↓1	Caelan ↓1	Patrick ↑2
10	Oscar	Oscar =	Oscar =	Ren Yinpeng ↓1	Zhang Jiayuan ↓3	Zhang Jiayuan =	Bo Yuan ↓1	Lelush ↑2	Zhang Jiayuan ↑1	Liu Zhang ↑2	Zhou Keyu ↑2
11	Jing Long	Caelan ↑1	Gan Wangxing ↑3	Oscar ↓1	Oscar =	Gan Wangxing ↓2	Zhang Jiayuan ↓1	Zhang Jiayuan =	Oscar ↑6	Patrick ↑2	Liu Zhang ↓1

Note: On Episode 10, Phases 1 and 2 refers to the time of voting that is open to the Citizen Producers.

=== Result ===
The finale was held on April 24, 2021, and was broadcast live. The final eleven members debuted as (INTO1).

#	Episode 10 (Total votes)		
#	Name	Votes	Company
1	Liu Yu (刘宇)	25,959,880	Biubiu Culture (哔哟哔哟)
2	Santa (赞多)	16,611,343	Avex Warps
3	Rikimaru (力丸)	16,591,943	Avex Warps
4	Mika (米卡)	16,255,569	Avex
5	Nine (高卿尘)	13,898,339	Insight Entertainment (洞察娱乐)
6	Lin Mo (林墨)	13,700,082	Original Plan (原际画)
7	Bo Yuan (伯远)	13,651,294	White Media (白色系)
8	Zhang Jiayuan (张嘉元)	13,612,487	Wajijiwa Entertainment (哇唧唧哇娱乐)
9	Patrick (尹浩宇)	13,359,428	Insight Entertainment (洞察娱乐)
10	Zhou Keyu (周柯宇)	13,279,523	Jaywalk Newjoy (嘉行传媒)
11	Liu Zhang (刘彰)	13,274,812	W8VES

== CHUANG 2021: Are You a Werewolf? ==
CHUANG 2021: Are You A Werewolf?, an immersive game reality show, is a derivative show of 《CHUANG 2021》. Trainees in themed costumes will become game players in another dimension, get through all passes and achieve the final victory. In the process, the outstanding intelligence, physical power and humor of the trainees will be shown.

Winners of the Episode

Participants
Episode 1	Episode 2	Episode 3	Episode 4	Episode 5	Episode 6	Episode 7	Episode 8	Episode 9	Episode 10
David	Chan Ruifeng	Fu Sichao	Caelan	Chen Junjie	Amu	Bo Yuan	Eisho	Bo Yuan	Caelan
Eisho	Hiroto	Lai Lai	Lin Mo	Han Peiqian	He Yifan	Gan Wangxing	Fu Sichao	Gan Wangxing	Fu Sichao
Liu Yu	Hu Yetao	Li Zhengting	Gan Wangxing	Lelush	Ichika	Lin Mo	Qu Boyu	He Yifan	Lin Mo
Lu Dinghao	Lin Mo	Lin Luxiu	Qu Boyu	Li Peiyang	Jing Long	Liu Yu	Rong Yao	Hu Yetao	Liu Zhang
Rong Yao	Liu Zhang	Liu Tanghui	Rikimaru	Li Zekun	Kazuma	Luo Yan	Wei Ziyue	Jing Long	Nine
Santa	Mika	Nuo Yan	Liu Cong	Nine	Liu Zhang	Nine	Wu Hai	Liu Yu	Patrick
Wei Ziyue	Oscar	Ren Yinpeng	Wu Hai	Ren Yinpeng	Ling Xiao	Patrick	Yu Gengyin	Lelush	Santa
Xue Bayi	Patrick	Xie Xingyang	Yuu	Wei Yujie	Wu Yuheng	Wang Xiaochen	Zhang Jiayuan	Oscar	Wu Yuheng
Zhang Jiayuan	Wu Yuheng	Yi Han	Zhang Jiayuan	Zhang Xinyao	Ye Haoran	Xie Xingyang	Zhang Teng	Ren Yinpeng	Zhang Jiayuan
Zhou Keyu	Zhang Teng	Yu Gengyin	Zhang Xingte	Zhou Keyu	Zheng Minxin	Zeng Hanjiang	Zhou Keyu	Zhang Xinyao	Zhou Keyu

== Discography ==
=== Singles ===
Title	Released	Language	Album	Label
As a Monster 《作为怪物》	March 3, 2021	Mandarin	Produce Camp 2021 Phase III (Part I)	Tencent
Break the Cocoon《破茧》	March 3, 2021	Mandarin	Produce Camp 2021 Phase III (Part I)	Tencent
Football Gang《超级冠军》	March 3, 2021	Mandarin	Produce Camp 2021 Phase III (Part I)	Tencent
LIT 《莲》	March 3, 2021	Mandarin	Produce Camp 2021 Phase III (Part I)	Tencent
Butter-Fly	March 3, 2021	Japanese	Produce Camp 2021 Phase III (Part I)	Tencent
I Joyfully Like You 《我欢喜喜欢你》	March 3, 2021	Mandarin	Produce Camp 2021 Phase III (Part I)	Tencent
Girl 《女孩》	March 6, 2021	Mandarin	Produce Camp 2021 Phase III (Part II)	Tencent
Yummy	March 6, 2021	English	Produce Camp 2021 Phase III (Part II)	Tencent
ME！	March 6, 2021	English	Produce Camp 2021 Phase III (Part II)	Tencent
Drunken Master《醉拳》	March 6, 2021	Mandarin	Produce Camp 2021 Phase III (Part II)	Tencent
Loverboy 88	March 6, 2021	Mandarin	Produce Camp 2021 Phase III (Part II)	Tencent
Radio	March 6, 2021	Mandarin	Produce Camp 2021 Phase III (Part II)	Tencent
Neon Dancing《霓虹甜心》	March 6, 2021	Mandarin	Produce Camp 2021 Phase III (Part II)	Tencent
爱 You Ready, 爱我Ready	March 6, 2021	Mandarin	Produce Camp 2021 Phase III (Part II)	Tencent
《我们一起闯》(pinyin: Wǒmen yīqǐ chuǎng; lit. 'Let's Venture Forth Together')	March 10, 2021	Mandarin	Non-album singles	Tencent
Chuang To-Gather, Go!	March 10, 2021	English	Non-album singles	Tencent
Believer	March 27, 2021	English	Produce Camp 2021 Phase IV (Part I)	Tencent
Lemon	March 27, 2021	Japanese	Produce Camp 2021 Phase IV (Part I)	Tencent
Love Birds 《爱情鸟》	March 27, 2021	Mandarin	Produce Camp 2021 Phase IV (Part I)	Tencent
峰项	March 27, 2021	Mandarin	Produce Camp 2021 Phase IV (Part I)	Tencent
The Whale Transformed Into An Isolated Island 《化身孤岛的鲸》*		Mandarin		Tencent
Fix Me	March 28, 2021	Mandarin	Produce Camp 2021 Phase IV (Part II)	Tencent
I Don't Care 《我管你》	March 28, 2021	Mandarin	Produce Camp 2021 Phase IV (Part II)	Tencent
Therefore, I Am	March 28, 2021	English	Produce Camp 2021 Phase IV (Part II)	Tencent
ปูหนีบอีปิ	March 28, 2021	Thai	Produce Camp 2021 Phase IV (Part II)	Tencent
You Better Not Think About Me《你就不要想起我》	March 28, 2021	Mandarin	Produce Camp 2021 Phase IV (Part II)	Tencent
输入法可爱按第五	April 10, 2021	Mandarin	Produce Camp 2021 Phase VIII	Tencent
Nana Party	April 10, 2021	Mandarin	Produce Camp 2021 Phase VIII	Tencent
Satellite XL 《卫星XL》	April 10, 2021	Mandarin	Produce Camp 2021 Phase VIII	Tencent
Adventure Plan《冒险计划》	April 10, 2021	Mandarin	Produce Camp 2021 Phase VIII	Tencent
Jade 《璧》	April 10, 2021	Mandarin	Produce Camp 2021 Phase VIII	Tencent
It's Raining, I'm Thinking of You	April 10, 2021	Mandarin	Produce Camp 2021 Phase VIII	Tencent
Definition	April 24, 2021	Mandarin	Produce Camp 2021 Phase 10	Tencent
Be Mine	April 24, 2021	Mandarin	Produce Camp 2021 Phase 10	Tencent
We Are The Youth, We Are The Future	April 24, 2021	Mandarin	Produce Camp 2021 Phase 10	Tencent
INTO1	April 24, 2021	Mandarin	Produce Camp 2021 Phase 10	Tencent

*The Whale Transformed Into An Isolated Island 《化身孤岛的鲸》- Zhou Shen's Version

Preceded by Produce Camp 2020	Chuang (franchise); Produce Camp 2021	Succeeded by Chuang Asia: Thailand
