= Into1 =

Chinese male group

- Origin: China
- Genres: C-pop; Mandopop
- Years active: 2021–2023
- Label: Wajijiwa
- Past members: Liu Yu; Santa; Rikimaru; Mika; Nine; Lin Mo; Bo Yuan; Zhang Jiayuan; Yin Haoyu/Patrick; Zhou Keyu; Liu Zhang

Into1 (pronounced as Into One, stylized in all caps) was a multi-national Chinese boy group formed through the 2021 reality show Produce Camp 2021 (Chuang 2021) on Tencent Video and managed by Wajijiwa Entertainment. The group consisted of eleven members: Liu Yu, Santa, Rikimaru, Mika, Nine, Lin Mo, Bo Yuan, Zhang Jiayuan, Yin Haoyu/Patrick, Zhou Keyu, and Liu Zhang.

The group officially disbanded on April 24, 2023, after expiration of their contract.

== History ==
=== Pre-debut ===
Before Produce Camp 2021 began, all of the members of Into1 were previously active in the entertainment industry. Liu Yu debuted as an actor in the 2020 series "Dear Herbal Lord" and in 2018, participated in iQiyi's national cultural talent contest, The Chinese Youth, placing 2nd. Bo Yuan is a member of the Chinese boy group 'ZERO-G' and was a contestant on Youth With You (season 1). Rikimaru and Santa are members of the Japanese-Chinese boy group 'WARPs Up'. Mika is a member of the Japanese boy group 'INTERSECTION'. Patrick made his acting debut in the Thai GMMTV series The Gifted: Graduation. Nine made his acting debut in the Thai series 2 Moons 2 as well as became a member of the Thai boy project group 'OXQ'. Lin Mo is a member of the Chinese boy group 'YiAn Music Club'. Zhou Keyu is a member of 'BEST' as well as made his acting debut in 'Remember that Boy'. Zhang Jiayuan is a member of 'Galaxy Band'. Liu Zhang was a contestant on 'Rap for Youth'.

=== 2021–2023: Produce Camp 2021, and The Storm Center ===
Into1 was formed through the reality television show Chuang 2021 aired from February 17 to April 24, 2021. On the live broadcast of the finale, it was announced that Liu Yu placed first, followed by Santa, Rikimaru, Mika, Nine, Lin Mo, Bo Yuan, Zhang Jiayuan, Yin Haoyu/Patrick, Zhou Keyu and Liu Zhang respectively.

The group officially debuted on the final episode of Produce Camp 2021 on April 24, 2021, and is expected to promote for around 2 years with the management rights handled by Wajijiwa Entertainment.

From May to June 2021, the group started active promotion and performed stages at various music festivals. On July 15, 2021, the group released its first EP, The Storm Center, with the lead single "Into The Fire". The group also announced the group's two-year development plan, named "Into1's Wonderland".

The group officially disbanded on April 24, 2023, after expiration of their contract.

== Members ==
- Liu Yu (刘宇) – leader
- Santa (赞多)
- Rikimaru (力丸)
- Mika (米卡)
- Nine (高卿尘)
- Lin Mo (林墨)
- Bo Yuan (伯远) – vice-leader
- Zhang Jiayuan (张嘉元)
- Yin Haoyu/Patrick (尹浩宇, แพทริค ณัฐวรรธ์ ฟิงค์เลอร์ / Patrick Nattawat Finkler)
- Zhou Keyu (周柯宇)
- Liu Zhang (刘彰)

== Discography ==
=== Extended plays ===
Title	Album details	Sales
The Storm Center (风暴眼)	Released: July 16, 2021; Label: Tencent; Formats: Digital download, streaming; Track listing: 1. Into1; 2. Into The Fire; 3. 风暴眼 (The Storm Center); 4. Chuang To-Gather, Go! (Chinese version); 5. Chuang To-Gather, Go! (English version); 6. Wonderland Party	CHN: 300,000+
Go Further (万里)	Released: December 17, 2021; Label: Tencent; Formats: Digital download, streaming; Track listing: 1. Into-Guangdong; 2. 点睛 (Hit The Punchline); 3. Into-Ningxia; 4. 风吹沙成海 (The Ocean Of Dunes); 5. Into-Chongqing; 6. 明早老地方, 出发 (See You); 7. 万里 (Go Further)	—
Into The Clouds (冲天志)	Released: July 12, 2022; Label: Tencent; Formats: Digital download, streaming; Track listing: 1. 天生就要飞 (Born To Fly); 2. 天上不会掉馅饼 (There Is No Free Lunch); 3. 一步一诗一梦 (Poems On The Journey); 4. 跳支夜的舞 (Dancing On The Moon); 5. 一杯火焰; 6. Together Somewhere	—

=== Singles ===
Title	Year	Peak chart positions	Album
Title	Year	CHN	Album
"Into1"	2021	—	The Storm Center
"Into the Fire"	2021	6	The Storm Center
"The Storm Center" (风暴眼)	2021	23	The Storm Center
"Wonderland Party"	2021	45	The Storm Center
"Hit The Punchline" (点睛)	2021	50	Go Further
"The Ocean Of Dunes" (风吹沙成海)	2021	33	Go Further
"See You" (明早老地方, 出发)	2021	50	Go Further
"Go Further" (万里)	2022	38	Go Further
"Together Somewhere"	2022	—	Into The Clouds
"Born To Fly" (天生就要飞)	2022	18	Into The Clouds
"There Is No Free Lunch" (天上不会掉馅饼)	2022	63	Into The Clouds
"Poems On the Journey" (一步一诗一梦)	2022	73	Into The Clouds
"Dancing On The Moon" (跳支夜的舞)	2022	92	Into The Clouds
"Grown Up" (就这样长大)	2023	84	Grown Up
"BumBuBum" (更酷的世界)	2023	—	Grown Up
"Everything" (没有拥抱的合照)	2023	83	Grown Up
"I Hate Goodbyes"	2023	91	Grown Up

=== Promotional singles ===
Title	Year	Peak chart positions	Notes
Title	Year	CHN	Notes
"Echoes of Ancient Shu" (古蜀回响)	2021	22	Promotional song for Sanxingdui cultural site
"Burning Youth" (燃烧吧青春)	2021	—	Promotional song for military documentary
"New Era, Winter Olympics" (新时代 冬奥运)	2022	—	Promotional song for Beijing 2022 Winter Olympics
"Warm Blood Makes the Ink" (热血为墨)	2023	—	Promotional song for Henan TV New Year's Eve gala

=== Soundtrack appearances ===
Title	Year	Peak chart positions	Album
Title	Year	CHN	Album
"Accidentally Forgot" (一不小心就忘记)	2022	60	Forget Me Not Farm OST

== Live performances ==
=== Concerts and fan meetings ===
Event	Date	Venue	City	Country	Ref.
Doki Fan Meeting	April 9, 2021	–	Haikou	China	
ChunZhen Fan Meeting	June 19, 2021	–	Hangzhou	China	
Into1 2023 "Grown up" Concert	April 1–2, 2023	Union Hall, Union Mall	Bangkok	Thailand	
Into1 2023 "Grown up" Concert	April 7, 2023	Shibuya Marui	Tokyo	Japan	
Into1 2023 "Grown up" Concert	April 21–22, 2023	Mercedes-Benz Arena	Shanghai	China	

== Filmography ==
=== Reality shows ===
Year	Show Titles	Network	Notes	Ref.
2021	Produce Camp 2021	Tencent, WeTV	Survival show determining Into1 members	
2021	Unknown Weekly! Into1!	Tencent, WeTV	Weekly vlog episodes	
2021	Lucky Into1	Tencent, WeTV	Mini weekly variety shows	
2021	Int Channel	Tencent, WeTV	Mini vlog episodes	
2021	Into Miles	Tencent, WeTV	Official documentary	
2022	All Kinds Of Into1 To The Sea	Tencent, WeTV	Group's variety show	
2022	Fresh One	Tencent, WeTV	Mini weekly variety shows	
2022	All Kinds Of Into1 To The Sky	Tencent, WeTV	Group's variety show	

== Awards and nominations ==
Year	Award ceremony	Awards	Result	Ref.
2021	28th Chinese Top Ten Music Awards	New Trending Group Potential Newcomers Group	Won	
2021	3rd Tencent Music Entertainment Awards	New Trending Group of the Year	Won	
2021	Sina Fashion Style Awards	Best Group of the Year	Won	
2021	Sohu Fashion Night	Most Popular Group of the Year	Won	
2021	IFeng Fashion Choice	Best Group of the Year	Won	
2022	Tencent Entertainment White Paper Gala	New Trending Group of the Year	Won	
2022	CCTV Dream Chinese Music Singing Center	Best Group	Won	
2022	CCTV Dream Chinese Music Singing Center	Top 10 New Single of Mid-year	Won	
2022	Asian Pop Music Awards	Best Group	Nominated	
2022	InStyle Icon Awards	Most Popular Group of the Year	Won	
2022	2022 WeTV Awards	Best Variety Show (Into The Sea)	Nominated	
2022	2022 WeTV Awards	Best Variety Show (Into The Sky)	Nominated	
2022	2022 WeTV Awards	Best Variety Show (INTO MILES)	Nominated	
2023	Chinese Singing Center Annual Music	Most Popular Group of the Year	Won	
2023	Chinese Singing Center Annual Music	Top 10 Golden Songs of the Year	Won	
2023	Weibo Music Awards 2022	Breakthrough Group of the Year	Won	
2023	Weibo Night 2022	Weibo Breakthrough Group of the Year	Won	
