= Liu Yu (singer) =

Chinese singer (born 2000)

- 刘宇
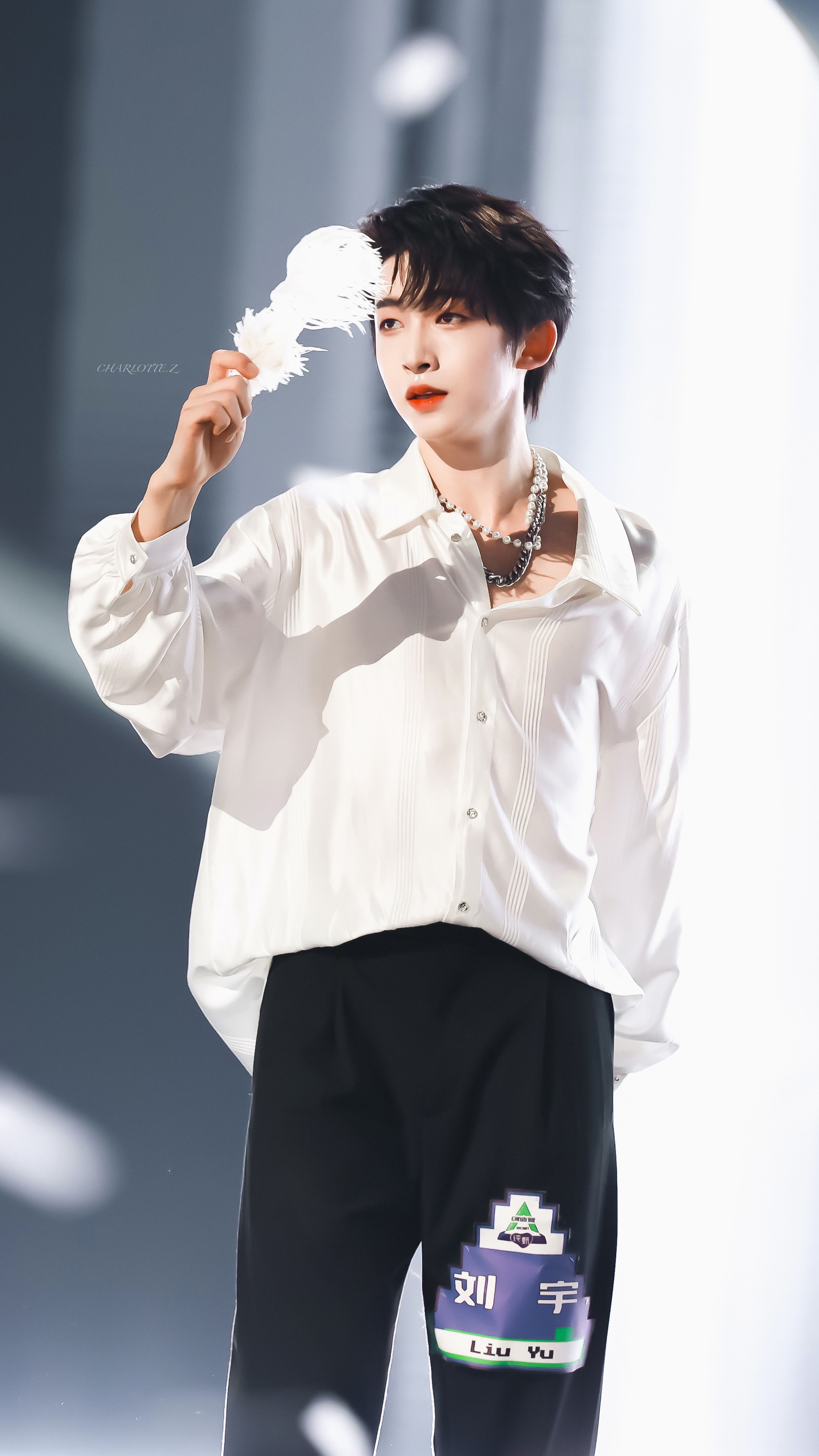
- Liu Yu at the Produce Camp 2021 (创造营2021) Final
- Born: Liu Yu; August 24, 2000 (age 26); Jing County, Anhui, China
- Occupations: Singer; dancer
- Musical career
- Genre: C-pop
- Instrument: Vocals
- Years active: 2018–present
- Labels: BiuBiu Culture; Wajijiwa; (Note: As a member of Into1 only.)

Liu Yu (Chinese: 刘宇; born August 24, 2000) is a Chinese singer, dancer and model. He is best known for placing first on the final episode of Produce Camp 2021 and becoming a member of the Chinese project boy group Into1. He made his solo debut on November 22, 2020, with the single "Docked".

== Early life and education ==
Liu Yu was born on August 24, 2000, in Jing County, Anhui. He studied traditional Chinese dance for sixteen years, beginning at age four. His parents divorced when he was young and he grew up under the care of his mother.

He studied dance and was admitted as 26th in the country at the Beijing Academy of Dance; however, he had to withdraw as he suffered injuries that prevented him from attending. He also thought about attending the Communication University of China but he did not.

== Career ==
=== 2018–2020: career beginnings, The Chinese Youth, and solo debut ===
In October 2018, Liu Yu appeared as a guest on the Chinese variety talent show Happy Camp, performing a Chinese traditional dance. After he appeared on the show, he gained a large following on Douyin.

In November 2018, he participated as a contestant on the Chinese reality show The Chinese Youth, a show focusing around Chinese culture. He entered the finals and ranked second place.

In June 2019, he appeared on the Chinese poetry culture show The Neighbourhood Poetry, performing a traditional Chinese dance. In August 2019, he released a collaborative single 垃圾分類等你來 (Garbage Sorting Song) alongside Shuangsheng, Qiran, and Shi Kai.

In November 2019, he made his solo debut with the single "靠岸" ("Docked"). On December 19, he released his second single "千歲" ("A Thousand Years"). On December 20, he won the Best Dancer Award at the Sino-Italian Cultural Festival of "World Dreams Come True"

On April 19, 2020, he released the single "星河入夢" ("Galaxy Dream"). On August 10, He made his acting debut in the Chinese television series Dear Herbal Lord playing the role of 'Chu Qi Xian'. On September 25, he released the single 得自在 (Be At Ease). On November 30, he released the single "幼年時常哼的歌" ("A song that I used to hum when I was young").

=== 2021–present: Produce Camp 2021, debut with Into1 and Ten Directions ===
On January 5, 2021, Liu Yu participated in the 'Light of Hanfu Lights China' at the "Southern Hanfu Festival"

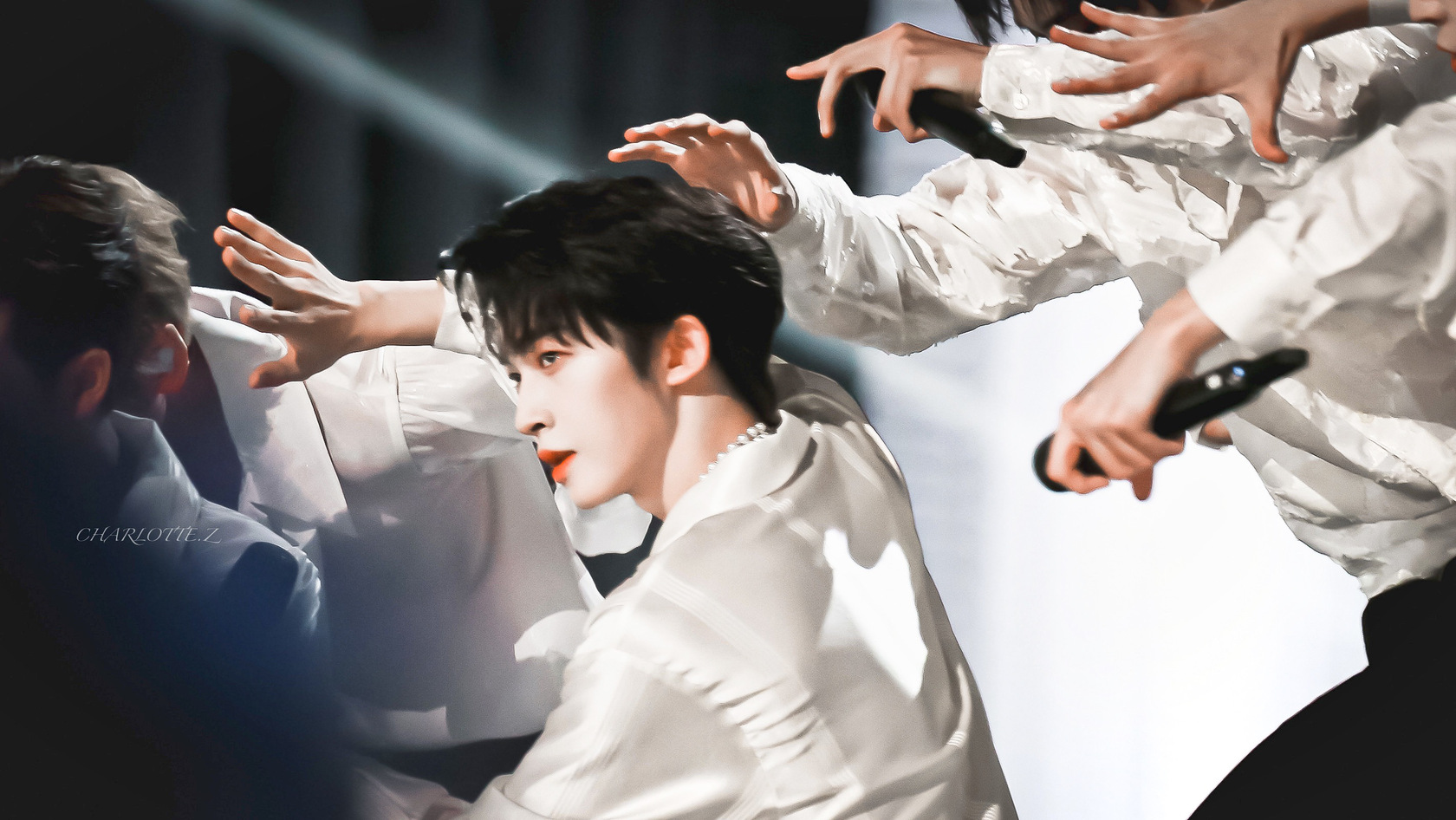
Liu Yu on April 24, 2021

In February 2021, he participated in the Chinese reality survival show Produce Camp 2021. In March 2021, he became the center of the theme song for the show. He consistently ranked in the high ranks throughout the show, and on the final episode he placed first with over 25 million votes, becoming the center of Into1. Later, he was voted to be leader of the group by the members.

On February 1, 2022, he performed his single "星河入夢" ("Galaxy Dream") at the Spring Festival Gala to welcome the Beijing Winter Olympic Games.

On April 12, 2022, he released his first EP album 柳叶刀 (Willow-leaf Saber).

In 2023, he released his single 'AYO', then his new solo album Ten Directions that focused as his 'Lead Single'.

On August 7, 2023, he released his special dance video for "Firework".

On December 8, 2023, there is only one trainee that performed his singles 'Focus+Firework released on the 2nd episode of PRODUCE 48 (2023).

== Ambassadorships and endorsements ==
Alongside Liu Yu's activities with INTO1, he has become the brand ambassador and spokesperson for brands such as L'Oréal, NET-A-PORTER, and L'OCCITANE. He has also appeared as a model for multiple magazines such as Rolling Stone, Ruili, Fashion Health, and OK! Wonderful.

Year	Role	Brand	Ref.
2021	Spokesperson	Breeze Tissues	
2021	Spokesperson	Perfect Diary	
2021	Brand Youth Ambassador	Skin Ceutical	
2021	Spokesperson	Mistine	
2021	Spokesperson	Miss Berry's	
2021	Brand Ambassador	Caltraste's	
2021	Brand Ambassador	L'Oreal Paris Skin Care	
2021	Chief Brand Officer	Biotherm	
2021	Brand Ambassador	L'OCCITANE	
2021	Brand Ambassador	NET-A-PORTER	
2021	Brand Ambassador	Joy Wash	
2021	Brand Ambassador	Blue Waves	
2021	Brand Ambassador	Abyb Charming	
2021	Spokesperson	Taobao	
2022	Spokesperson	OBAGI	
2022	Brand Ambassador	COSMEPORT	
2022	Brand Ambassador	Swarovski	
2022	Brand Ambassador	Daniel Wellington	
2022	Brand Ambassador	Elemis	
2022	Beauty Ambassador	Cosmopolitan	
2023	Brand Ambassador	Eucerin	
2023	Spokesperson	CARSLAN	
2023	Spokesperson	Semir	
2023	Spokesperson	Melaleuca	
2023	Brand Friend	FRED	

- Love Ambassador for China Children's Mercy Association Love Health Special Fund (2022)

== Discography ==
=== Single albums ===
List of single albums, showing selected details, selected chart positions, and sales figures
Title	Details	Peak chart positions (TME Uni Chart)	Sales
Title	Details	TME Physical Album Sales Chart	Sales
文刀刘	Released: April 10, 2022; Label: Wajijiwa Entertainment; Formats: CD, digital download, streaming; Track listing: 1. "INTRO: LIU刘"; 2. "白话文"; 3. "柳叶刀"	—	CHN: —
流域	Released: July 6, 2022; Label: BiuBiu Culture Media; Formats: CD, digital download, streaming; Track listing: 1. "春晖"; 2. "时光会记得"; 3. "Ayo"	—	CHN: —
十方艺念	Released: August 2, 2023; Label: BiuBiu Culture Media; Formats: CD, digital download, streaming; Track listing: 1. "Focus"; 2. "Firework"; 3. "潮生"; 4. "只听晚风"; 5. "酌"; 6. "漠"	1	CHN: —

=== Singles ===
Title	Year	Peak (TME Uni Chart)		Ref.
Title	Year	CHN	Score	Ref.
Docked 靠岸	2019	—	—	
Sleepless Flight 失眠飞行	2019	—	—	
Thousand Years Old 千歲	2019	—	—	
Galaxy Dream 星河入夢	2019	—	—	
Be at Ease 得自在	2020	—	—	
Sunny and You 天晴和你	2020	—	—	
A song that I used to hum when I was young 幼年時常哼的歌	2020	—	—	
Willow-Leaf Saber 柳葉刀	2022	1	97.90	
Vernacular 白话文	2022	2	97.52	
CHUNHUI 春晖	2023	1	96.10	
Focus	2023	—	—	

=== Collaborative singles ===
Title	Year	Peak chart positions
Title	Year	CHN
Garbage Sorting Song 垃圾分類等你來	2019	—

=== Soundtrack appearances ===
Title	Year	Peak chart positions	Notes
Title	Year	CHN	Notes
Summer is Here 盛夏已至	2022	4	
Youth is Worth It 青春挺值得	2022	—	

=== Other songs ===
Title	Year	Peak chart positions	Ref.
Title	Year	CHN	Ref.
Summer Wind 夏天的风	2022	2	

=== Composition credits ===
Year	Artist	Song	Lyrics	Music	Notes
2022	INTO1	一杯火焰; Together Somewhere	Yes	No	Chinese version

== Filmography ==
=== Television series ===
Year	Title		Role	Notes	Ref.
Year	English	Original	Role	Notes	Ref.
2020	Dear Herbal Lord	亲爱的药王大人	Chu Qi Xian	Supporting Role	

=== Television shows ===
Year	Title		Notes	Ref.
Year	English	Original	Notes	Ref.
2018	Happy Camp	快乐大本营	Guest Performer	
2018	The Chinese Youth	国风美少年	Contestant; Placed 2nd	
2021	Produce Camp 2021	创造营2021	Survival Show determining Into1 Members; Placed 1st	
2022	It's a Familiar Flavor	是很熟的味道呀	Cast Member	
2022	Masked Dancing King: Season 3	蒙面舞王第三季	Contestant	

=== Hosting ===
Year	Title	Notes	Ref.
2021	Sina Fashion Awards 2021	MC	

== Awards and nominations ==
Year	Award ceremony	Awards	Result	Ref
2019	Sino-Italian Cultural Promotion Ceremony of World Dreams Come True	Best Dancer	Won	
2022	CCTV Dream Chinese Music Singing Center	Versatile Singer	Won	
2022	CCTV Dream Chinese Music Singing Center	Best Male Singer	Won	
