= Lin Mo =

Chinese singer and former member of Into1 (born 2002)

- 林墨
- Born: January 6, 2002 (age 24); Chongqing, China
- Occupations: Singer; dancer; actor
- Musical career
- Genre: C-pop
- Instrument: Vocals
- Years active: 2014–present
- Labels: Original Plan; Wajijiwa; (Note: As a member of Into1 only.)

Huang Qilin (Chinese: 黄其淋; born January 6, 2002), stage name Lin Mo (Chinese: 林墨) is a Chinese singer, songwriter, dancer, and actor. He is best known for being a former member of the boy group Into1 after placing sixth on the finale of Produce Camp 2021. He is also a member of the boy group Yi'an Music Club.

== Early life and career ==
=== 2014–present: Debut with Yi'an Music Club, solo debut and debut with Into1 ===
From 2013, Lin Mo was a trainee under TF Entertainment. He participated in various variety shows and made his acting debut under the company. After his contract expired in November 2016, he left TF Entertainment and joined Original Plan Entertainment.

In 2017, Lin Mo became a first generation student of 'Yi'an Music Club', the group made their official debut on March 30, 2017, with their single "Chitty Bang Bang Bang". On September 29, 2017, Lin Mo starred in the Yi'an Music Club original Theater Show "The Emergency 24 Hours of Yi'an Musical".

On May 30, 2019, he released the collaboration single "Runaway" alongside Sun Yi-hang. On July 31, 2019, he made his official solo debut with the single "Sea, Ground, Sky", in which he participated in the lyric writing. On August 18, 2019, he released the OST single "Twin Stars" alongside Sun Yi-hang for the Chinese web drama Endless Eighteen. On December 3, the song "Alive" with Yu Muyang and Mo Wenxuan was released. On December 18, he released the solo single "Talking to Oneself".

On July 15, 2020, he released the solo single "Not Good with Words" (言浅情深).

On January 7, 2021 he starred in the Chinese television drama Youth Melody, playing as the main role. On February 1, 2021 he released the solo single "Make Me Wanna". On February 18, 2021 he participated in the survival reality competition show Produce Camp 2021. On the final episode on April 24, 2021, he placed sixth and became a member of the multi-national boy group Into1.

== Ambassadorships and endorsements ==
Alongside his activities with Into1, Lin Mo has various endorsements with and serves as an ambassador for brands such as Tide, Pocky, and Coach. He has also appeared on the cover of magazines such as Madame Figaro.

Year	Role	Brand	Ref.
2021	Brand Ambassador	Tide	
2021	Brand Ambassador	Safeguard	
2021	Brand Ambassador	Pocky	
2021	Spokesperson	Marubi	
2021	Spokesperson	Mask Family	
2021	Spokesperson	Grace	
2021	Spokesperson	Carslan	
2021	Spokesperson	Oh Fresh	
2021	Brand Ambassador	AHC	
2021	Brand Ambassador	Coach	

== Discography ==
=== Extended plays ===
List of extended plays, showing selected details, selected chart positions, and sales figures
Title	Details	Peak chart positions	Sales
Title	Details	(TME Uni Chart)	Sales
OAO	Released: May 16, 2023; Label: Original Plan; Formats: CD, digital download, streaming	—	—

=== Singles ===
Year	Title	Peak (TME Uni Chart)		Ref.
Year	Title	CHN	Score	Ref.
2018	"Arc of Youth" (临摹青春)	—	—	
2019	"Sea Ground Sky" (海上地上天上)	—	—	
2019	"Talking to Oneself" (和自己对话)	—	—	
2020	"Not Good with Words" (言浅情深)	—	—	
2021	"Make Me Wanna"	—	—	

=== Collaborative singles ===
Year	Title	Peak (TME Uni Chart)		Ref.
Year	Title	CHN	Score	Ref.
2019	"Run Away" (with Sun Yihang)	—	—	
2019	"Alive" (with Yu Muyang and Mo Wenxuan)	—	—	
2020	"Twin Stars" (双子星) (with Sun Yihang)	—	—	

=== Soundtrack appearances ===
Year	Title	Peak (TME Uni Chart)		Notes	Ref.
Year	Title	CHN	Score	Notes	Ref.
2019	"Eighteen More" (十八more) (with Sun Yihang)	—	—	Endless Eighteen OST	
2021	"Burning Youth" (燃烧吧青春) (with Bo Yuan and Zhang Jiayuan)	—	—	Theme song of the military documentary Fall in! New Recruits	
2022	The Song of Yuanyuzhou (圆鱼洲之歌)	—	—	Theme song of The Oasis	

=== Other songs ===
Year	Title	Peak (TME Uni Chart)		Notes	Ref.
Year	Title	CHN	Score	Notes	Ref.
2021	You Don't Understand my Heart 其实你不懂我的心	—	—		

=== Songwriting credits ===
Year	Artist	English Title	Chinese title	Lyrics	Music	Ref.
2019	Lin Mo	Sea, Ground, Sky	海上地上天上	Yes	No	

== Filmography ==
=== Web dramas ===
Year	English title	Chinese title	Role	Network	Note	Ref.
2015	Typhoon Entertainment Events	台风娱乐大事记	Boss	Tencent Video, Bilibili		
2016	Finding Soul	超少年密码	Zhang Li-qun	LeTV	Supporting role	
2016	Twenty-one Days with Cats	和喵星人的21天	Huang Qi'er	Bilibili		
2017	Stop! Painters	罢工吧！画手	Lin Mo	Bilibili, IQIYI		
2021	Youth Melody	少年如歌	Lin Mo	iQiYi	Main role	

=== Web show ===
Year	English title	Chinese	Network	Notes	Ref.
2014	TF Boys GO	TF少年GO第二季	Youku， iQIYI	Season 2 and 3	
2015	Friday Trainee	星期五练习生	Youku， iQIYI		

=== Television show ===
Year	English title	Chinese	Network	Notes	Ref.
2021	Produce Camp 2021	创造营2021	Tencent Video	Survival show determining Into1 members Finished 6th	
2022	Want to See You	想见你	BesTV	Cast Member	
2022	The Oasis	登录圆鱼洲	Tencent Video	Cast Member	
2022	The Mews	美好年华研习社	Hunan TV, Mango TV	Cast Member	

=== Theater ===
Year	English title	Chinese title	Role	Location	Note	Ref.
2017	"The Emergency 24 Hours of Yi'an Musical"	易安音乐社告急的24小时	Lin Mo	Shanghai Ke Center For The Contemporary Arts	Eight Public Performances	
