= Rikimaru Chikada =

Japanese dancer (born 1993)

- Born: 近田力丸; 2 November 1993 (age 32); Hyōgo, Japan
- Other names: Liwan, Riki, Chikada Rikimaru, RKMR
- Education: Kyoto University of Foreign Studies Department of Brazilian and Portuguese Studies
- Style: Pop, Dance-pop, R&B

Rikimaru Chikada (近田力丸, Chikada Rikimaru; born November 2, 1993) is a Japanese singer, dancer, and choreographer, currently based in China. He was a member of the international boy group Into1 after finishing third place in the Chinese survival competition show Produce Camp 2021. He is also the leader of Japanese-Chinese boy group WARPS UP.

== Early life and family ==
Rikimaru Chikada was born on 2 November 1993 in Hyōgo, Japan. His mother was a jazz dancer and used to run a dance studio. His father is a professional baseball player and coach. His younger sister, Yumeri Chikada, is also a dancer and choreographer. He attended high school at Itami Kita High School and graduated from Kyoto University of Foreign Studies, majoring in Portuguese (Department of Brazilian and Portuguese Studies).

Rikimaru started dancing at the age of 4, started teaching dance at the age of 13, and became a choreographer at the age of 19. Rikimaru's commercial choreography debut is BoA's LookBook Dance Break in 2015.

== Career ==
=== 1997–2015: Career beginnings ===
Rikimaru started learning dance at age 4. At age 9, he and his mother appeared and danced in the Japanese variety show named "Gakkō e Ikō". In 2007, Rikimaru and his sister Yumeri formed the dance group named Respect. From 2007 to 2008, Respect participated in many dance competitions in Japan and won awards such as 4th Dance Olympics Champion, MOVE MIX BEST G Class Champion, 9th COMBOX Champion, National Super Kids Dance Contest Kyushu Tournament Champion, 2nd K-palette cup Runner-up, Dance Attack Tokyo Tournament Runner-up, Shikoku Tournament Special prize, Kobe Rokko Island 1st Dance Championship Special prize, etc...

In addition, Rikimaru also won some individual awards including KIDS MIX 2007 Best Dancer Award and ALL KANKUU Dance Contest Excellent Performance Award 2007.

From 2012 to 2015, Rikimaru went to Los Angeles (USA) to learn choreography, choreographing skills and interact with many dancers. During his time in LA, he auditioned and joined ImmaBEAST, an America's champion teen dance group, one of the top hip-hop dance groups in the USA.

=== 2015–2020: Debut as a choreographer and WARPs UP ===
He began choreographing at 19, working on the team of renowned choreographer Rino Nakasone before earning his first credit on a project with BoA's "Look Book". He has choreographed for many artists such as BoA, SHINee, Taemin, Red Velvet, NCT127, etc.

In 2016, Rikimaru was invited to be a judge of the Dance Vision contest in China. In 2018, Rikimaru and his sister Yumeri led the team and won Dance Vision Vol. 6. In the same year, his choreography won the runner-up award of the World Of Dance Junior (Osaka Station). From 2016 to 2018, Rikimaru was a dance choreographer and special guest coach at dance studio "1M Studio Dance" in South Korea.

In 2019, he made his debut as the leader of Japanese-Chinese boy group WARPs Up, under the Avex Trax record label. He also choreographed the group's dances.

=== 2021–April 2023: Produce Camp 2021 and INTO1 ===
In 2021, Rikimaru, as an Avex Trax trainee, participated in Produce Camp 2021, a reality competition show to create an international boy band formation produced by Tencent Video. Rikimaru was in Class A throughout the show. His rankings in the show as the show progressed was: 8 – 8 – 4 – 3 – 3 – 3 – 4 – 4 – 3. On 24 April 2021, Rikimaru ranked third during the final episode with 16,591,943 votes, securing him a spot as an official member of the project boy group INTO1.

In August 2021, Rikimaru was hospitalized due to a long-running back injury and took a hiatus from promotional activities while he recovers. In May 2022, Rikimaru returned to his activities in INTO1. The group officially disbanded on April 24, 2023.

=== April 2023–Present: Solo Artist ===
On April 25, 2023, his personal studio was officially launched, thus kickstarting his career as a solo artist. On July 27, 2023, his first single as a solo artist, "TALKIN'BOUT" was released. Rikimaru followed up with a release of his first full-length studio album CLOWN OR CROWN in September 2023. He subsequently went on an eponymous tour in November–December 2023. In November 2023, the Youku-produced music variety show "Rising Land" which he starred as a regular cast started airing. On January 18, 2024, Rikimaru was announced as HUGO Brand Ambassador. He also starred in the brand's Spring/Summer 2024 campaign. In April 2024, he served as judge for World of Dance China for both the junior and adult divisions.

In April 2024, Rikimaru announced through a livestream that he was no longer with Avex. On July 2, 2024, Rikimaru released a new single "CAN'T GET ENOUGH". He performed at the 2024 Tencent Music Entertainment Award(TMEA) held in Macau, China on July 19 and 21, 2024. Rikimaru also served as the dance director for the last day on the event. On November 1, 2024, Rikimaru released a new single "Your Ghost".

== Endorsements ==
Alongside Rikimaru's activities with Into1, he has become a brand ambassador and spokesperson for some brands.

Year	Role	Brand	Ref.
2021	Asia Pacific Ambassador	Sitrana	
2021	Brand Essence Ambassador	Elixir	
2021	Asian Region Lip Specialty Ambassador	Celvoke	
2021	Brand Ambassador	Nescafé	

== Discography ==
=== Singles ===
Year	Title	Album
2022	UP and Down 无限想象	Non Album Single
2022	Daisy	Non Album Single
2022	Monster	Non Album Single
2023	TALKIN'BOUT	CLOWN OR CROWN
2024	CAN'T GET ENOUGH	
2024	Your Ghost	

=== Studio album ===
Year	Title
2023	CLOWN OR CROWN

=== Production credits ===
Year	Artist	English Title	Lyrics	Music	Choreography	Ref.
2022	Rikimaru Chikada	UP and Down 无限想象	Yes	Yes	Yes	
2022	Rikimaru Chikada	Daisy	Yes	Yes	Yes	
2022	Rikimaru Chikada	Monster	Yes	Yes	Yes	

== Notable choreography ==
=== Personal works ===
No	MV/Stage	Artist	Note	References
1	Famous	Taemin	MV, Taemin Arena Tour 2019	
2	Eclipse	Taemin	Taemin Arena Tour 2019	
3	Into the Rhythm	Taemin	Taemin Arena Tour 2019	
4	One Shot Two Shot	BoA	MV	
5	ABOAB	SHINee	Concert SHINee World 2017	
6	Tell me your name	SHINee	Concert SHINee World 2017	
7	JOJO	SHINee	Concert SHINee World 2017	
8	Nothing to lose	SHINee	Concert SHINee World 2017	
9	Kitchen Beat	NCT127	NCT 127 Arena Tour NEO CITY: JAPAN	
10	I wanna I wanna	Banana Lemon	3 versions	
11	Girls gone wild	Banana Lemon		
12	SugarBaby	Banana Lemon		
13	Ever After	Tokyo Girl's Style		
14	2016 Crazy World	Show Lo	R&B	
15	Cloud9	WARPs UP		
16	Supernova	WARPs UP		

=== Collaborative choreographies ===
No	MV/Stage	Artist	Note	Team	References
1	Lookbook	BoA	Dance Break		
2	Mars	Taemin	Taemin Arena Tour 2019	Rino Nakasone	
3	Slave	Taemin	Taemin Arena Tour 2019	Rino Nakasone team	
4	Tiger	Taemin	Taemin Arena Tour 2019	Rino Nakasone team	
5	Kiminoseide	SHINee	Concert SHINee World The Best 2018, Japan	Rino Nakasone	
6	Evil	SHINee	Concert SHINee World The Best 2018, Japan	Rino Nakasone team	
7	Stranger	SHINee	Concert SHINee World The Best 2018, Japan	Rino Nakasone team	
8	Love like oxygen	SHINee	Concert SHINee World The Best 2018, Japan	Rino Nakasone team	
9	Your name/Replay	SHINee	Musical version Concert SHINee World The Best 2018, Japan	Rino Nakasone team	
10	Every time	SHINee		Rino Nakasone team	
11	Work you out	SHINee	Dancers performance	Rino Nakasone team	
12	GENTLEMEN	SHINee		Rino Nakasone, Maika	
13	Rookie	Red Velvet	Intro		
14	One Hundred Degrees	WARPs UP			

== Filmography ==
=== Television series ===
Year	Name	Notes	Reference
2011–2012	Sekai 1 no SHOW taimu 〜 gyara wo kime runoha anata 〜		
2011–2012	Sutadorafuto kaigi		
2011–2012	PON!		
2011–2012	24 jikan terebidansu koushien		
2011–2012	Toku dane		
2011–2012	Hirunandesu		
2021	Produce Camp 2021	Contestant; Finished third	

=== Music video appearances ===
Year	Name	Artist	Role	Reference
2016	LookBook	BoA	Dancer	
2015	Make That Sh*t Work	Willdabeast, T-Pain ft. Juicy J	Dancer	
2015	You Will (Dance Video)	Kento Mori	Dancer	
