= Zhai Xiaowen =

Chinese singer and actor (born 1999)

- (翟潇闻)
- Born: May 28, 1999 (age 27); China Jinan, Shandong, China
- Other name: Bill，Owen
- Education: Sangdong Institute of Commerce and Technology
- Occupations: Singer; Dancer; Actor
- Years active: 2018 – present
- Notable work: Television dramas: Falling into Your Smile; Dear Parents; Always Home; Songs: 海岸引力; 局部有雨
- Height: 186 cm (6 ft 1 in)
- Musical career
- Genres: Mandopop; Hip hop
- Instrument: Vocals
- Labels: Shenzhen Tencent Computer Systems Co., Ltd. (2018–present); Wajijiwa Entertainment (Tianjin) Co., Ltd. (2018–present); Zhai Xiaowen Studio (2021–present)
- Formerly of: R1SE
- Website: Official website

Chinese name
- Traditional Chinese: 翟瀟聞
- Simplified Chinese: 翟潇闻
- Hanyu Pinyin: Zhái Xiāowén

Zhai Xiaowen (Chinese: 翟潇闻; pinyin: Zhái Xiāowén, born May 28, 1999) is a Chinese singer and actor from Jinan, Shandong, China. He is currently signed to Wajijiwa Entertainment and was formerly a member of the boy band R1SE.

In 2018, Xiaowen participated in the Tencent Video entertainment talent show The Coming One 2 (明日之子第二季), where he placed among the top nine contestants in the "Super Visual" category. That same year, he made his acting debut in the youth romance drama Unrequited Love (暗恋橘生淮南).

In 2019, he took part in the idol survival reality show Produce Camp 2019 (創造營2019), and on June 8, placed sixth in the final, debuting as a member of the limited-time boy group R1SE. He officially began his career as a singer with the group's debut.

On June 14, 2021, after R1SE officially concluded all group activities, Xiaowen continued his solo career under "Zhai Xiaowen Studio," a personal studio operated by Wajijiwa Entertainment.

He is known for his participation in the survival reality show Produce Camp 2019 (創造營2019), where he finished in sixth place. He is also known for his role in Falling into Your Smile (你微笑时很美) as Sunflower and Always Home (树下有片红房子) as Jing Qichi.

== Early life ==
Zhai Xiaowen was born on May 28, 1999, in Jinan, Shandong, China. The idea of wanting to become an artist first came to him as a child while watching the TV series《My Fair Princess》at home. During his college years, because he felt that people were entitled to do things they might not be sure of at the age of 18 or 19, he decided to go on stage to give it a try and participated in talent competitions,《The Coming One S2》and《Produce Camp 2019》. He previously used the username「没错翟潇闻」 to share his music-related content on online platforms.

== Career ==
In 2018, Xiaowen competed as a contestant on the Tencent Video entertainment talent show The Coming One 2, where he ranked among the top nine contestants in the "Super Visual" category. On August 18, Xiaowen participated in the 3rd Fan Carnival. In the same year, he made his acting debut in the youth campus drama Unrequited Love, co-starring with Hu Yitian and Hu Bingqing, in which he played the role of Xu Zhian. He also took part in Tencent Video's cross-genre sports and entertainment program Super Novae Games.

In 2019, Xiaowen participated in the Tencent Video idol survival show《Produce Camp 2019》, and performed the show's theme song, "Call My Name". On May 22, he attended the《doki Grand Party》fan meeting held by the program team at Chengyang Stadium in Qingdao. On May 29, Xiaowen participated in the fifth anniversary celebration of the《Mageline skincare brand》held at the Phoenix Center in Beijing. During the filming of the show, Xiaowen also appeared in photo shoots for several fashion magazines, including VOGUE Me. On June 8, during the final episode of Produce Camp 2019, Xiaowen ranked sixth after multiple rounds of competition and officially debuted as a member of the boy group R1SE. That same night, R1SE released their debut single, 《R.1.S.E》, which also served as the China-region promotional theme song for the film Men in Black: International. On July 19, R1SE released the ending theme song《無愧》for the film Shanghai Fortress. On August 2, the group released the ending theme song《榮耀的戰場》) for the television drama The King's Avatar. On August 4, Zhai Xiaowen, along with He Luoluo, Liu Ye, Ren Hao, and Zhao Lei, released the promotional and ending theme song《少年如故》for the animated series Mo Dao Zu Shi. This marked the first time R1SE had recorded a promotional song for a Chinese animated series. On August 6, R1SE released their first music EP titled 《就要掷地有声的炸裂》, which included six tracks such as 《R.1.S.E》and《誰都別吝嗇》. On August 11, R1SE's first group reality show,《Super R1SE·蓄能季》premiered online. On September 6, R1SE received the Group of the Year award at the GQ Men of the Year Awards hosted by GQ China. On October 12, Xiaowen participated in the second season of the youth sports crossover variety show《Super Novae Games》(《超新星全运会》). On October 31, R1SE received the Most Popular New Group award at the Asia New Songs Chart Annual Festival. On December 3, R1SE received the Group of the Year award at the COSMO Glam Night "Heritage & Beauty" ceremony. On December 9, R1SE's EP《就要掷地有声的炸裂》won the Best Group Album award at the TMEA Tencent Music Entertainment Awards. Additionally, he participated in R1SE's nationwide concert tour, "WE ARE R.1.SE – 2019 R1SE National Tour".

In May 2020, Xiaowen participated with R1SE in the idol group competition reality show《炙热的我们》, which officially premiered. On July 28, he began filming the period family drama 《Dear Parents》, playing the role of Li Bing. On October 22, it was officially announced that he would participate in the reality show《神奇公司在哪里》.

On May 2 and 3, 2021, Xiaowen participated in R1SE's farewell concerts in Shanghai. On June 13, he took part in the final show and farewell ceremony titled 我们破晓星辰 – R1SE Limited Farewell Concert. On June 14, he officially graduated from the limited-time group R1SE and subsequently established his personal studio. In September, he joined the third season of the music competition program《我们的歌》, broadcast by Dragon TV.

On May 28, 2022, Xiaowen released his first solo album《澈》. On the same day, the songs《海岸引力》and《乘梦飞行》were released on NetEase Cloud Music. On June 8, the second wave of tracks《有你的天气》and《什么时候我们开始不说话》were launched, featuring special collaborations with musicians Yu Jiayun and Wansuiye. On June 24, the track《请伴随我一直跑》, described as an emotional companion piece, was released. On September 10, Xiaowen began filming the historical romance drama《Cao Xuanxuan's Love Journey》, playing the male lead Guo Zijie.

== Filmography ==
=== Television series ===
Year	Title (Chinese title)	Role	Network	Ref.
2021	Unrequited Love (暗恋橘生淮南)	Xu Zhian (徐志安)	Tencent Video, Mango TV	special appearance
2021	Falling into Your Smile (你微笑时很美)	Jian Yang (簡陽)	Youku, Tencent Video	main cast
2021	Dear Parents (TV series) (亲爱的爸妈)	Li Bing (李冰)	iQIYI, Tencent Video	main cast
2021	Sweet Teeth (世界微尘里)	Liu Yucheng (劉宇誠)	iQIYI	special starring role
2025	Cao Xuanxuan's Love Journey (了不起的曹萱萱)	Guo Zijie (郭子傑)	Tencent Video	male lead
2025	Always Home (树下有片红房子)	Jing Xichi (景棲遲)	Tencent Video	male lead
2025	The First Frost (难哄)	Xiang Lang (向朗)	Youku	guest appearance
2025	Love in Pavilion (淮水竹亭)	Yang Yitan (楊一嘆)	iQIYI	second male lead
2026	Dream of Golden Years (你好1983)	Zhou Cheng (周誠)	iQIYI	male lead
TBA	Eternal Faith (吉星高照)	Xie Lian (謝憐)	iQIYI	male lead
TBA	Summer in Your Name (以你为名的夏天)	Zhang Shu (張澍)	Youku	male lead
TBA	The Taste of Victory (胜利的滋味)	Lin Xu Dong (林序東)	Mango TV	male lead

=== Film ===
Year	Title (Chinese title)	Role	Network	Ref.
2024	Burning Star (孤星计划)	Luo Shiwen (羅世聞)		cameo appearance
TBA	The Old Dog (老江湖)	Wen Dousi (溫豆絲)		

== Variety shows ==
=== Regular Cast ===
Broadcast Period	Broadcast Platform	Program Name	Notes
June 30, 2018 – September 14, 2018	Tencent Video	The Coming One 2 (明日之子 (第二季))	Aired one episode every Saturday starting June 30, 2018; finals broadcast live on September 14.
November 1, 2018 – November 22, 2018	Tencent Video	Supernova Games (超新星運動會)	Aired one episode every Thursday starting November 1, 2018; finals held on November 10–11.
April 6, 2019 – June 8, 2019	Tencent Video	Produce Camp 2019 (創造營2019)	Ranked sixth overall and officially debuted as a member of the group R1SE. Aired one episode every Saturday starting April 6, 2019; finals on June 8.
August 11, 2019 – November 10, 2019	Tencent Video	Super R1SE Energy Season (Super R1SE ‧ 蓄能季)	R1SE exclusive small-group variety show. Aired one episode every Sunday starting August 11, 2019; concluded November 10.
October 12, 2019 – November 3, 2019	Tencent Video	Supernova Games 2 (超新星運動會第二季)	Aired one episode every Saturday starting October 12, 2019; episode 4 aired earlier on October 28; finals held November 1–3.
December 1, 2019 – January 5, 2020	Tencent Video	The Autumn of Eleven (十一少年的秋天)	R1SE exclusive large-group variety show. Aired one episode every Sunday starting December 1, 2019; concluded January 5, 2020.
May 29, 2020 – July 23, 2020	Tencent Video	Burning Youth (炙熱的我們)	Aired one episode every Friday starting May 29, 2020; finals held on July 23.
July 5, 2020 – August 22, 2020	Tencent Video	Super R1SE Anniversary Season (Super R1SE ‧ 週年季)	R1SE exclusive small-group variety show. Aired one episode every Sunday starting July 5, 2020; concluded August 22.
July 11, 2020 – September 25, 2020	Hunan Television	Happy Camp: Steadied Friends (快樂大本營站穩了朋友)	Aired one episode every Saturday starting July 11, 2020; finals broadcast on September 25.
July 16, 2020 – August 16, 2020	Tencent Video	Supernova Games 3 (超新星運動會第三季)	Aired one episode every Thursday starting July 16, 2020; finals held August 14–16.
November 6, 2020 – January 8, 2021	Dragon Television	Where is the Magical Company (神奇公司在哪裡)	Pilot aired on October 30, 2020; regular episodes aired every Friday from November 6, 2020; three Saturday episodes on November 14, 21, 28; concluded January 8, 2021.
April 3, 2021 – June 5, 2021	Dragon Television	Golden Melody Youth (金曲青春)	Aired one episode weekly starting April 3, 2021; participated in episodes 5, 9, and 10.
April 29, 2021 – May 21, 2021	Tencent Video	We, Before Dawn (我們,破曉之前)	R1SE exclusive large-group variety show. Aired one episode weekly starting April 29, 2021; episode 4 postponed to May 21, 2021; concluded.
October 3, 2021 – December 5, 2021	Dragon Television	Our Song 3 (我們的歌第三季)	Aired one episode every Sunday starting September 19, 2021; participated in episodes 3, 4, 6, 8, and 9.
March 2, 2022 – May 11, 2022	Youku	I Who Haven't Dated (沒談過戀愛的我)	Aired one episode every Wednesday starting March 2, 2022; concluded May 11, 2022.
March 19, 2022 – June 12, 2022	Mango TV	New to the Workplace: Forensic Season (初入職場的我們·法醫季)	Aired one episode every Saturday and Sunday starting March 19, 2022; concluded June 12, 2022.
July 30, 2022 – November 15, 2022	Dragon Television	Check-in! Foodie Group 2 (打卡吧!吃貨團第二季)	Pilot aired on July 29, 2022; regular episodes aired every Saturday starting July 30; missed episodes 9–11 due to schedule conflicts; concluded November 15, 2022.
November 16, 2022 – March 22, 2023	BesTv	Starry Bay Kitchen (摘星灣廚房)	Culinary spin-off focusing on off-stage experiences; preview aired November 15, 2022; biweekly episodes on Wednesdays starting November 16; concluded March 22, 2023.
June 15, 2024 – August 31, 2024	Hunan Television, Mango TV	City Hide and Seek (城市捉迷藏)	Aired one episode every Saturday starting June 15, 2024; missed episodes 4–6 due to recording of Chinese Restaurant 8; concluded August 31, 2024.
July 19, 2024 – October 4, 2024	Hunan Television, Mango TV	Chinese Restaurant 8 (中餐廳第八季)	Aired one episode every Friday starting July 19, 2024; concluded October 4, 2024.
June 20, 2025 – September 5, 2025	Hunan Television, Mango TV	Chinese Restaurant 9 (中餐廳第九季)	Pilot aired on June 19, 2025; regular episodes aired every Friday starting June 20, 2025; concluded September 5, 2025.

=== Variety Show Guest Appearances ===
Year	Broadcast Date	Platform	Program Name	Episode	Notes
2019	August 4	Tencent Video	Sing! China 300 (合唱吧！300)	2	One episode aired every Sunday starting July 28, 2019
2019	September 1	Tencent Video	Sing! China 300 (合唱吧！300)	6	One episode aired every Sunday starting July 28, 2019
2019	August 10	Tencent Video	The Coming One: Girls Season (明日之子水晶時代)	8	One episode aired every Saturday starting June 15, 2019, 10 episodes total; Debut performance of new song "誰都別吝嗇"
2019	August 13	Tencent Video	We Are Growing Up (我們長大了)	9	One episode aired every Tuesday starting June 18, 2019, 10 episodes total
2019	August 20	Tencent Video	We Are Growing Up (我們長大了)	10	One episode aired every Tuesday starting June 18, 2019, 10 episodes total
2019	November 1	Beijing Television	Meet the Temple of Heaven (遇見天壇)	9	Performed "誰都別吝嗇"
2020	May 16	Tencent Video	Chuang 2020 (創造營2020)	3	One episode aired every Saturday and Sunday starting May 2, 2020, 10 episodes total Episodes 3-4: Appeared as special mentor for public performance Episode 10: Support guest, performed "Call My Name", "赤腳追光", "曜"
2020	May 17	Tencent Video	Chuang 2020 (創造營2020)	4	One episode aired every Saturday and Sunday starting May 2, 2020, 10 episodes total Episodes 3-4: Appeared as special mentor for public performance Episode 10: Support guest, performed "Call My Name", "赤腳追光", "曜"
2020	July 4	Tencent Video	Chuang 2020 (創造營2020)	10	One episode aired every Saturday and Sunday starting May 2, 2020, 10 episodes total Episodes 3-4: Appeared as special mentor for public performance Episode 10: Support guest, performed "Call My Name", "赤腳追光", "曜"
2020	September 4	Tencent Video	The Serious Gaga (認真的嘎嘎們)	10	One episode aired every Friday starting July 13, 2020, 10 episodes total Participated as graduation support team
2022	February 5	Beijing Television	Athletes United (運動者聯濛)	1	Winter Olympics special version aired nightly at 9:30 PM starting February 5, 2022, Full version aired every Saturday and Sunday at noon starting February 20, 2022, 15 episodes total
2022	February 6	Beijing Television	Athletes United (運動者聯濛)	2	Winter Olympics special version aired nightly at 9:30 PM starting February 5, 2022, Full version aired every Saturday and Sunday at noon starting February 20, 2022, 15 episodes total
2022	February 7	Beijing Television	Athletes United (運動者聯濛)	3	Winter Olympics special version aired nightly at 9:30 PM starting February 5, 2022, Full version aired every Saturday and Sunday at noon starting February 20, 2022, 15 episodes total
2022	February 9	Beijing Television	Athletes United (運動者聯濛)	5	Winter Olympics special version aired nightly at 9:30 PM starting February 5, 2022, Full version aired every Saturday and Sunday at noon starting February 20, 2022, 15 episodes total
2022	February 19	Hunan Television	Hello Saturday (你好，星期六)	20220219	Theme: Film and TV Study Class Opens, performed "頑固"
2022	April 23	Hunan Television	Hello Saturday (你好，星期六)	20220423	Performed "這就是愛" ft. Zhao Xiaotang
2022	July 16	Tencent Video	Start Reasoning (開始推理吧)	Case 7	Guest appearance as security guard Xiao Wen
2022	July 23	Tencent Video	Start Reasoning (開始推理吧)	Case 8	Guest appearance as security guard Xiao Wen
2022	July 30	iQIYI	Detective Cute Season 2 (萌探探探案2)	11	Guest appearance in "Legend of the Demon Cat", played White Crane Youth Dan Long
2022	August 7	Dragon Television	Go Fighting! Season 8 (極限挑戰8)	6	Escort Competition, Chaotian Team
2022	August 17	BesTv	Bargain Hunting Team (砍價天團)	1	One episode aired every Wednesday and Thursday starting August 17, 2022
2024	August 31	Hunan Television	Hello Saturday (你好，星期六)	240831	Theme: Hello Street Summer Party, partnered with Hu Yitian to promote Chinese Restaurant 8; performed "想在夏日撞見你"
2025	March 29	Hunan Television	Hello Saturday (你好，星期六)	250329	Theme: Limited Steps Challenge, partnered with Yang Xizi to promote the cast of "Red House Under the Tree"
2025	April 26	Hunan Television	Hello Saturday (你好，星期六)	250426	Theme: Huaishui Group Family Battle, to promote the cast of "Love in Pavilion"
2025	May 9	Zhejiang Television	Keep Running Season 13 (奔跑吧)	2	Theme: Worker's Transformation
2025	May 21	Tencent Video	Laugh When I See You (一見你就笑)	6	Theme: Red House Hilarious After-Sales Facing Dark History!, partnered with Zhou Keyu, Yang Xizi, He Qiu, Zhang Xiaoan to promote the cast of "Always Home"
2025	June 14	Hunan Television	Hello Saturday (你好，星期六)	250614	Theme: Hello Street Summer Rose Competition, performed "孤獨人間"
2025	June 23	Hunan Television	Our Dormitory (我們的宿舍)	Guest	Theme: Housewarming Party
2025	July 26	Hunan Television	Hello Saturday (你好，星期六)	250726	Theme: Spikes Food Battle, partnered with Huang Xiaoming, Jiang Yan, Ding Yuxi, Shen Yue, Yin Haoyu, Lin Shuwei to promote Chinese Restaurant 9
2026	February 9	Hunan Television	Hello Saturday (你好，星期六	260209	Theme: “True Love” anti-fraud experiment; appeared with Zhou Ye to promote the cast of Dream of Golden Years
2026	June 27	Hunan Television	Hello Saturday (你好，星期六	260627	Theme: “SUIKESI's Debut Stage on 'Hello Saturday'”
2026	July 7	Hunan Television	Our Dormitory (我們的宿舍)	260707 Ep.4	Theme: My Odyssey Period
2026	August 15	Hunan Television	Hello Saturday (你好，星期六)	260815	Theme: "Let's go on a Qixi date!"

== Discography ==
=== Singles ===
Album	Album information	Tracks
1st	《澈》: Release Date：May 28, 2022; Language：Mandarin; Label：Wajijiwa Entertainment; Note：Debut solo album	Tracks: 1. 海岸引力; 2. 乘夢飛行; 3. 有你的天氣; 4. 什麼時候我們開始不說話; 5. 請伴隨我一直跑
2nd	《六月局部下孤獨》: Release Date：May 28, 2024; Language：Mandarin; Label：Wajijiwa Entertainment	Tracks: 1. 局部有雨; 2. 夜盲的麻雀; 3. 微醺潛水艇; 4. 入戲; 5. 失重
3nd	《？》: Release Date：November 12, 2026; Language：Mandarin; Label：Wajijiwa Entertainment	Tracks

=== Personal Singles ===
Release Date	Song Title	Notes
May 5, 2022	《立夏時年青》	Theme song for Henan TV's *Chinese Solar Terms Series – “Lixia Adventure”*
July 23, 2022	《解暑》	Theme song for Henan TV's *Chinese Solar Terms Series*

=== Soundtracks ===
Title (Chinese title)	Year	Album
"Signs of You" (漾)	2021	Falling Into Your Smile OST
"Quietly" (静静地)	2021	Dear Parents OST
"Youth Journey" (青春旅途)	2021	Dear Parents OST
"Say That In Your Mind"	2021	Sweet Teeth OST
"Let's Meet Someday" (不如找天見面)	2025	Always Home OST
"As long as I see you" (只要見到你)	2026	Dream of Golden Years

=== "Produce Camp 2019" Performance Songs ===
Episode	Performance Song	Collaborating Performers	Notes
April 5, 2019	《喊出我的名字》 (Group)	All trainees of “Produce Camp 2019”	Official theme song of the show
Episode 1	《西門少年》 (Group)	Zhou Zhennan, Yan Xujia, Xia Zhiguang, Zhao Lei, Peng Chuyue	Initially graded B. All members chose to challenge Class A; failed to reach A and were directly downgraded to F.
Episode 1	《情深深雨濛濛》 (Solo)	—N/a	Initially graded B. All members chose to challenge Class A; failed to reach A and were directly downgraded to F.
Episode 3	《青春紀念冊》 (Group)	Niu Chao, Lin Ran, Ren Hao, Lin Yadong, Guo Jiarui, Gu Tianhang	
Episode 6	《兒時》 (Group)	Li Yunrui, Zhang Jiongmin, Zhang Dayuan, Dong Xiangke	Center position; received the highest number of likes in the group
Episode 8	《敢》 (Group)	Li Yunrui, Qin Tian, Duan Haonan, Xiao Kaizhong, Ma Xueyang, Wang Yiheng	Center position; assisted senior Chen Yuqi
Episode 10	《夢裡》 (Solo)	—N/a	Received 10,581,322 likes and ranked 6th, officially debuting as a member of R1SE
Episode 10	《赤子》 (Group)	Zhou Zhennan, Yan Xujia, Xia Zhiguang, Zhao Lei, Peng Chuyue, Yao Chen, Zhang Yanqi, Qin Tian, Lu Siheng, Wu Jifeng, Li Xinyi, Duan Haonan	Received 10,581,322 likes and ranked 6th, officially debuting as a member of R1SE

=== "Our Song (Season 3)" Performance Songs ===
Episode	Theme	Performance Song	Collaborating Performers
Episode 3	Blind selection solo song	《對愛渴望》	—N/a
Episode 3	No-rehearsal performance with senior singer	《聽說愛情回來過》	Lü Fang
Episode 3	National Day tribute song	《那麼愛你》	Lü Fang, Da Zhangwei, Zhou Bichang, Wang Sulong, Liu Yuning, Meng Huiyuan, Shan Yichun
Episode 4	One Song, One Story (Senior Singer)	《彎彎的月亮》	Lü Fang
Episode 6	One Song, One Story (New Voice Singer)	《你給我聽好》	Lü Fang
Episode 8	Second-round team battle	《滿懷可愛所向披靡！》	Lü Fang, Da Zhangwei, Wang Sulong
Episode 8	Second-round team battle	《耶利亞女郎》	Lü Fang, Da Zhangwei, Wang Sulong
Episode 8	Second-round team battle	《給所有知道我名字的人》	Lü Fang, Da Zhangwei, Wang Sulong
Episode 9	Is There a Song That Reminds You of Me?	《朋友別哭》	Lü Fang
Episode 9	Is There a Song That Reminds You of Me?	《假如愛有天意》	Lü Fang

== Event Appearances ==
=== Performance Events ===
Year	Date	Location	Event	Notes
2021	June 17	Chongqing	Happy Hi-Fun Chongqing City Shopping Carnival	Setlist: 《和你》
2021	December 31	Shanghai	Dream Comes True — 2022 Dragon TV New Year’s Eve Gala	Setlist: 《在美好的新時代共同出發》《唱給最可愛的人》
2022	February 2	-	China Dream, My Dream — 2022 China Online Video Annual Ceremony	Setlist: 《孤勇者》
2022	May 3	Henan	Henan May Fourth Youth Day Special Program	Setlist: 《強國一代有我在》
2023	October 31	Beijing	Weibo Welcome Night	Setlist: 《請伴隨我一直跑》《乘夢飛行》
2024	July 30	Hangzhou	City Hide-and-Seek · Four Seasons Surprise Night	Setlist: 《夜盲的麻雀》
2025	January 23	Hunan	Hunan TV 2025 Spring Festival Gala	Setlist: 《情非得已》《女孩》
2025	June 17	Changsha	JD 618 Happy Night	Setlist: 《不值得》《日不落》
2026	May 5	Guangdong Shenzhen	CCTV "The Future Is Mine" — 2026 May Fourth Youth Day Special Program	Setlist: 《一灣》
2026	August 30	Hubei Wuhan	Kuaishou "Kuaishou Super Summer Night"	Setlist: 《解暑》《海岸引力》《立夏時青年》
2026	September 25	Shandong Qingdao	Qingdao Liyuan Comedy Festival	
2026	October 17	Sichuan Chengdu	"WEN SCHOLAR" Fan meeting in Sichuan University	Setlist: 《只要見到你》《有你的天氣》song of third album (not release yet)

=== Music Festivals ===
Year	Date	City	Venue	Festival	Notes
2021	July 31	Ningbo	Romon U-Park	Romon U-Park — A Summer of Stars	Setlist: 1. 黑洞裡; 2. 內疚; 3. 阿楚姑娘; 4. 情深深雨濛濛(Talking清唱)
2022	July 9	Chengdu	Happy Valley	HOMO Electronic Music Festival	Setlist: 1. 什麼時候我們開始不說話; 2. 請伴隨著我一直跑; 3. 情深深雨濛濛(Talking清唱); 4. 有你的天氣; 5. 我們倆(Talking清唱); 6. 乘夢飛行(Talking清唱); 7. 海岸引力
2023	September 22	Jinan	Shandong Provincial Stadium	Wajijiwa 2023 Summer Party	Setlist: 1. 夏夜晴朗的晚上; 2. 愛情轉移; 3. 海岸引力; 4. 請伴隨著我一直跑; 5. 出去玩(大合唱)
2025	May 2	Beijing	Changping Château Lafitte	Genki Forest Music Festival	Setlist: 1. 什麼時候開始不說話; 2. 蘇州河; 3. 局部有雨; 4. 雨愛; 5. 不如找天見面
2025	May 4	Shanghai	International Music Village	Super Mango Music Festival	Setlist: 1. 什麼時候開始不說話; 2. 有你的天氣; 3. 愛愛愛; 4. 匿名的好友; 5. 局部有雨
2025	October 3	Taicang	Houlang Young Block	Genki Forest Music Festival — Suzhou Houlang Stop	Setlist: 1. 你的背包; 2. 下雨天; 3. 月牙灣; 4. 不枉; 5. 請伴隨著我一直跑
2026	March 21	Fuyang	Fuyang Zebra Music Festival Grounds	2026 Peak · Zebra Music Festival – Fuyang	Setlist: 1. 如果愛下去; 2. 最佳歌手; 3. 只要見到你; 4. 天黑黑; 5. 局部有雨; 6. 請伴隨著我一直跑
2026	April 11	Guilin	Guihai Qinglan	Tencent Musician Fantasy Paradise Music Festival	Postponed
2026	April 25	Kaifeng, Henan	Wansui Mountain Martial Arts City	Wansui Mountain Jianghu Music Festival	Setlist: 1. 有你的天氣; 2. 紅豆; 3. 只要見到你
2026	July 19	Shenyang, Liaoning	Heping Cup World Football Park	Shenyang Rose Music Festival	Postponed

=== Brand Events ===
Year	Date	City	Venue	Festival	Notes
2019	May 29	Mageline	Beijing	Mageline 5th Anniversary Glamour Ceremony	Attended together with Yao Chen and Dai Jingyao
2020	May 28	PERFECT DIARY	-	Koi of All Things — 8-Day Star Livestream Marathon	Douyin Live
2020	September 5	Downy	-	R1SE Zhai Xiaowen’s “Smells So Good” Sports Day	JD Live
2020	September 17	Dr. Ci:Labo	Beijing	Dr. Ci:Labo New Product Ceremony	Tmall Live
2021	June 15	Maestro	Joy City, Jing’an, Shanghai	Fun to the End — Style Party with Zhai	Taobao Live, Offline Fan Meeting
2021	June 16	Biotherm	Chongqing	“Rising with the Wind, Riding the Waves of Youth”	JD Biotherm 618 Mid-Year Festival Live
2021	August 19	Armani	-	Star Information Bureau	Armani Tmall Super Brand Day
2021	August 27	CHANDO	-	Supporting Himalaya Public Welfare	JD CHANDO Super Brand Day
2021	October 23	fnf Instant Tea	Shanghai	Milk Tea Convenience Store	Taobao Live, Offline Fan Meeting
2021	November 10	Estée Lauder	-	Beauty Upgrade — Arriving by Name	JD Live
2022	April 7	Fresh	-	Tonight’s Big Star — Zhai Xiaowen is Here	Taobao Live
2022	May 11	Pure Zhen	-	Guilt-Free, Truly Delicious	517 JD Foodies’ Carnival
2022	May 20	Estée Lauder	-	Love Without Fear — Love at First Line	JD Super Brand Flash Sale Day
2022	May 31	SWAROVSKI	-	Life Should Be Loved Like This!	Tmall 618 Star Night
2022	July 30	Estée Lauder	-	Boundless Love, Romantic Revival	JD Super Brand Day
2022	September 6	OLAPLEX	-	Zhai-Style Haircare Insights	Taobao Live
2022	September 10	Lacoste	-	Lacoste Super Magic Factory	Douyin Live
2022	September 27	Fresh	-	JD Mini-Box × Fresh	JD Live
2023	February 9	Ryo	-	Amino Acid-Enhanced — Stable Repair Power	Meituan App Live
2024	March 21	Bawang Chaji	Quanzhou, Fujian	Bawang Chaji – Zhai Xiaoyun: Connecting Over Tea	Quanzhou Stop – One-Day Store Manager
2024	September 25	Pechoin	-	Collagen "Zhai" Express Delivery	JD Live
2025	April 1	LINLEE Handcrafted Lemon Tea	-	Thai Cool Refreshment Time	Douyin Live
2025	April 17	CPB Clé de Peau Beauté	-	Radiance Upgrade — “Wen” to Win	JD Live
2025	April 27	FLOWERLURE	-	Xiao Xiao’s Flower Language — Radiant Elegance	Douyin Live
2025	May 13	MOLSION Eyewear	Shenyang Tesco MIXC	Stars Attract Each Other	Tmall/Douyin/Xiaohongshu Live
2025	May 15	FulQun	-	Summer Herbal Tea with Zhai Xiaowen — Professional Skincare, Outstanding Results	Douyin/Taobao Live
2025	May 17	Estée Lauder	-	“Love in Every Moment” Singing & Dance Debut	Douyin Live
2025	June 13	OKCS	-	Free-Spirited, Outstanding Like “Wen”	Douyin Live
2025	July 29	POSITIVEHOTEL	-	Coffee Anytime, No Cup Needed	Douyin Live
2025	August 19	AZTK	-	A Little “Xiao” Trick, A Little Cool Surprise	Douyin Live
2025	August 28	SOFTYMO	-	“Xiao”-Smooth Cleansing — Glowing Bare Skin	Douyin Live
2025	September 23	Dong-E E-Jiao	-	Wen Nuan Golden Autumn Gift	Douyin Live
2025	December 15	L'Oréal Little Honey Jar	-	“Xiao” Style Explore “Mi” Skin Youth	Douyin Live
2026	January 4	Qixin Tian Spicy Crab	-	New Year Flavor, Love Sets Sail	Douyin Live
2026	January 26	MakeUpForEver	-	Soft Skin, Light Honey Partner	Douyin Live
2026	March 6	Spes	-	That Summer, Fluffy and Carefree	Douyin Live
2026	April 2	Yu Ze Dr.Yu	Wuhan JD Mall Xujia Peng	JD Super Star Fan Day	JD Live
2026	May 10	Can Ban Toothpaste	Henan Zhengzhou Dennis David City L5	With you, Zhai	想自由 幾分之幾
2026	July 11	Sprite	Changsha Dafeng Space	2026 Sprite Cool & Refreshing Campus Music Competition	QQ Music
2026	August 2	Sprite	Henan Zhengzhou Yinji Ice & Snow Hotel International Convention & Exhibition Center	2026 Sprite Cool & Refreshing Campus Music Competition	QQ Music
2026	September 6	Sprite	Nanjing Olympic Sports Center Guoyuan V9 Sports Arena	2026 Sprite Cool & Refreshing Campus Music National Championship Finals	QQ Music

=== Livestream Events ===
Year	Date	Platform / Location	Event Name	Notes
2021	January 10	YY Live	Idol Y Live	Setlist: 1. I Miss You So Much; 2. Waste; 3. Rainbow; 4. Third Person; 5. Love That Never Loses Contact
2021	August 14	Weibo Live	Behind-the-scenes Fun Facts of the Jiang Siblings	Joint live session for *Dear Parents* with Zhang Yijie & Li Chunyuan
2026	August 22	Kuaishou	Zhai Xiaowen Super Summer Gala Warm-up Livestream: Bill's Summer Night Live	Setlist: 1. 歲月神偷; 2. 春風吹; 3. 第三個吻痕

=== Fashion Events ===
Year	Date	Location	Event	Notes
2018	October 17	Seoul	S/S Hera 2019 Seoul Fashion Week	-
2020	February 23	-	PORTS 1961 Milan Fashion Week – Online Show from Home	Tencent Cloud Live Broadcast
2021	November 16	Sanya	GQ 2021 MEN OF THE YEAR	Dressed as a playful cowboy holding a water gun
2021	November 19	Shanghai	Givenchy 2022 Pre-Spring Collection Presentation	-
2025	September 10	Shenzhen	Shenzhen MixC; MiuMiu Pop-up	MiuMiu Atheneum
2026	May 24	Shanghai INS Wonderland	Land Rover Defender Music Party	Night for DEFENDER
2026	May 28	Shanghai	LOEWE's 180th Anniversary	-

== Awards and achievements ==
Year	Awarding Organization	Award	Notes
2020	Super Nova Games Season 3	Mixed 4×50m Swimming Relay Champion	Participated together with Li Wenhan, Sunnee, and Zheng Naixin
2021	China International Youth Film Festival Online & Television Ceremony (Golden Guduo Online Film and TV Festival)	Potential Actor of the Year	-
2023	Weibo Welcome Gala	Weibo Most Youthful and Energetic Artist	Performed《乘夢飛行》and 《請伴隨我一直跑》
2025	iQIYI Scream Night 2025	Top 10 Actors of the Year – Drama Category	
