= Yin Haoyu =

Thai-German actor, singer and model (born 2003)

- 尹浩宇 แพทริค ณัฐวรรธ์ ฟิงค์เลอร์
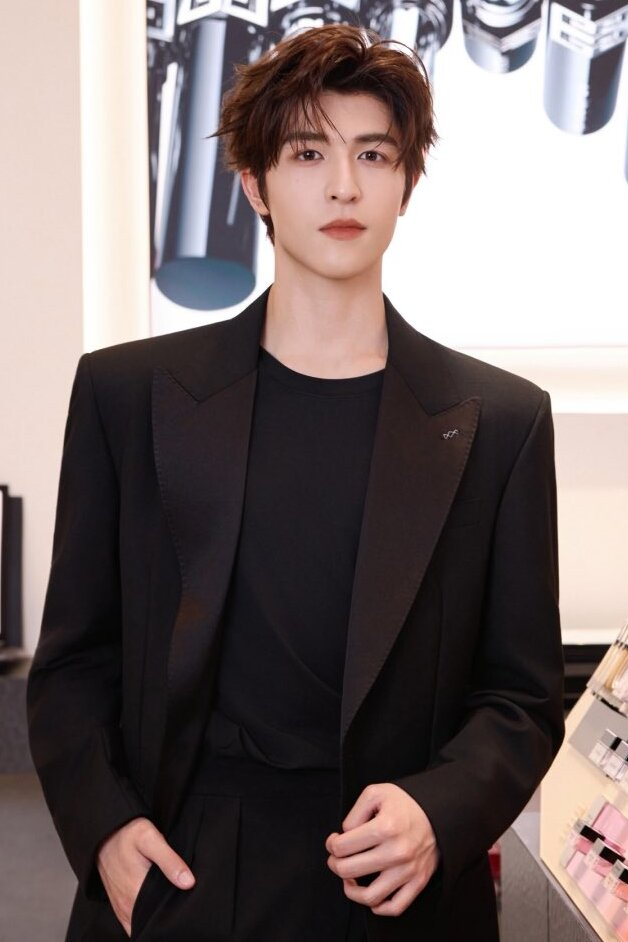
- Yin Haoyu in 2025
- Born: Patrick Finkler; 20 October 2003 (age 22); Saarland, Germany
- Other name: Patrick Finkler
- Education: Beijing Film Academy
- Alma mater: Triam Udom Suksa School
- Occupations: Actor; singer; dancer; songwriter; host
- Years active: 2019–present
- Agents: GMMTV (2019–2020); Yin Haoyu Studio (2024–present); EE-Media (2025–present)
- Height: 182 cm (5 ft 11 1/2 in)
- Musical career
- Genres: Pop; Mandopop; T-pop; C-pop
- Instruments: Vocals, Piano, Keyboard, Guitar
- Labels: Wajijiwa (Note: As a member of Into1 only.); EE-Media
- Formerly of: Into1

Chinese name
- Traditional Chinese: 尹浩宇
- Simplified Chinese: 尹浩宇
Transcriptions
Standard Mandarin
- Hanyu Pinyin: Yǐn Hàoyǔ
- Website: Official website

Patrick Nattawat Finkler (Thai: แพทริค ณัฐวรรธ์ ฟิงค์เลอร์; born 20 October 2003), known professionally as Yin Haoyu (Chinese: 尹浩宇; pinyin: Yǐn Hàoyǔ), also known as Patrick Finkler (Thai: แพทริค ฟิงค์เลอร์), is a Thai-German actor, singer, dancer, songwriter based in China. He first became known for his role as Time in the television series The Gifted: Graduation (2020). Patrick made his big screen debut as a main role with the romance film Delicious Romance (2023). He has been a cast member of the Chinese variety show Wonderland since 2022. He is a former member of the Chinese boy group INTO1.

In addition to his acting career, Patrick is a prominent celebrity endorser for brands and products. He made his official debut as a solo artist on 29 June 2023, with the release of the single "Sparkle".

== Early life and education ==
Patrick Nattawat Finkler was born in Saarland, Germany, on 20 October 2003, the son of Thai mother Rosrin Finkler and German father Reinhold Bandhard Finkler. After graduating from kindergarten and grade 1–4 in Germany, he came back to Thailand and spent 3 months to do the equivalence test for 4th grade and successfully enrolled in Semester 2, 4th Grade at Roi Et Kindergarten school English Program in October, 2014. He graduated Grade 7–9 from Roi Et Wittayalai School in Gifted Program. During that time, he was also the vice president of To Be Number One club and a drum major of school Marching band. Patrick, then, studied in high school at Triam Udom Suksa School, majored in Language-Germany, Gifted English program. Only 1 year after he entered high school, he decided to take General Educational Development (GED) exam and then take a flight to China to participate in Produce Camp 2021.

In April 2023, Patrick was accepted into China's two most prestigious performing arts colleges: Beijing Film Academy and Central Academy of Drama, after having passed the college entrance examination; which received much media fanfare. In September, Patrick enrolled in Beijing Film Academy, majoring in acting. During his time at the Beijing Film Academy, he served as a freshman class representative of the Performance Department and bilingual host of the 22nd International Student Film and Video Festival in 2023.

== Career ==
=== Pre-debut; 2016–2020: Career beginnings and acting debut ===
In 2016, Patrick was chosen to be one of the actors in the Thai local series, Phu Kaem Non @101 (ภูแก้มนนท์ @101), but later withdrew from the series due to time conflict from the postponement of filming and his Thai pronunciation.

In 2019, Patrick started his career when he won the second edition of Go On Girl & Guy Star Search by Clean & Clear by performing the song "Thinking 'bout you" which was written by himself in the Finals round. Following his win, he signed an exclusive contract as an actor of GMMTV.

Patrick made his acting debut in 2020 with the main role of Time in the Science fantasy series The Gifted: Graduation.

=== 2021–2023: INTO1, solo activities and film debut ===
In China, he is known by his Chinese name Yin Haoyu. On 18 February 2021, Patrick participated in the Chinese survival show program Produce Camp 2021. He consistently ranked within the Top 11 throughout the show. In the finals, he ranked ninth with 13,359,428 votes and officially debuted as a member of the multi-national boy group Into1.

In May 2022, Patrick made his big-screen debut in the romance film Delicious Romance (2023), directed by Chen Zhengdao and Xu Zhaoren. The film was released on 15 April 2023.

From June to August 2022, Patrick joined the second season of Tencent Video's reality show Wonderland as a regular cast member. Following the group's disbandment in April 2023, Patrick was active as a solo artist and actor in mainland China.

=== 2023–present: Breakthrough ===
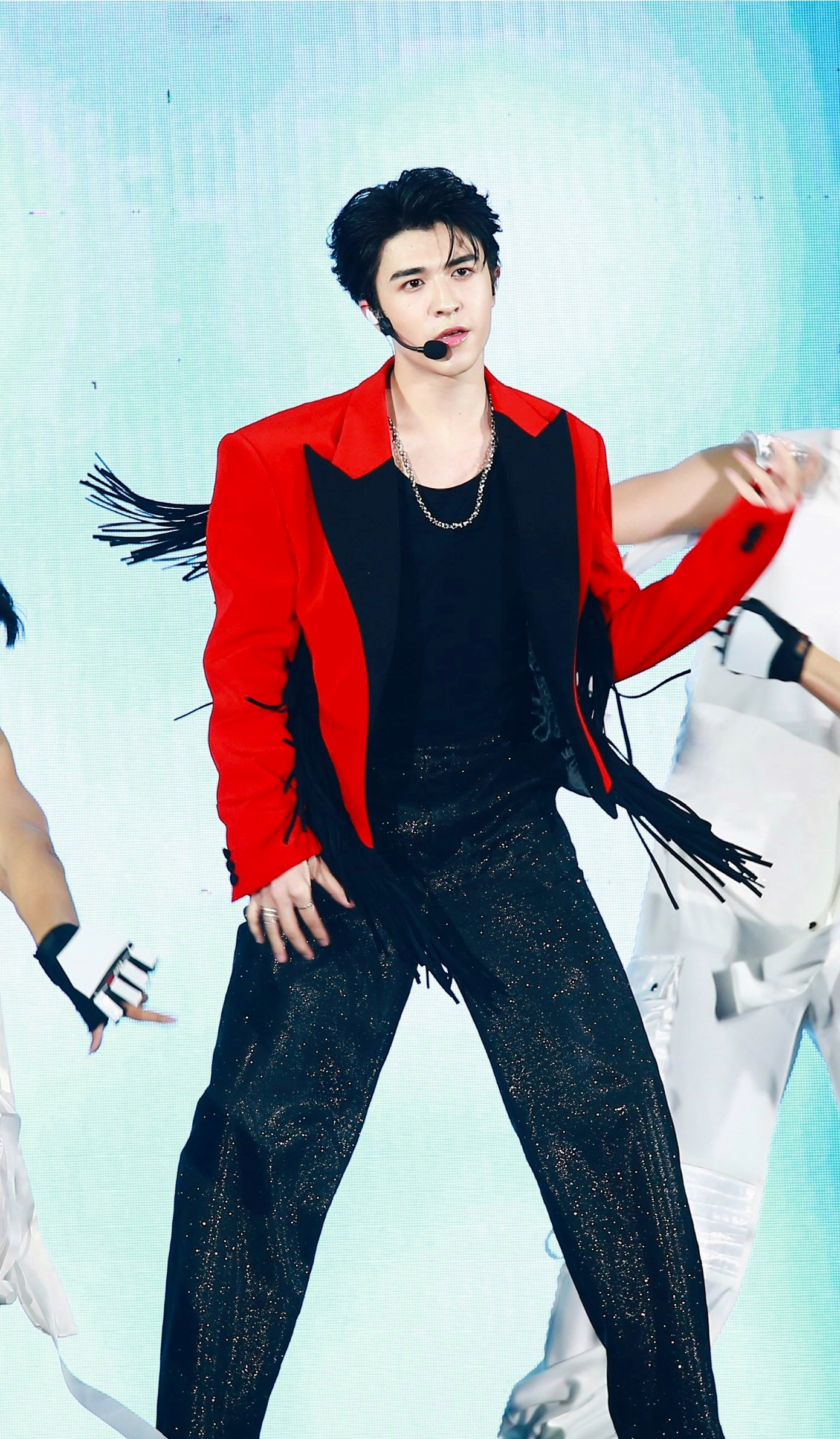
Patrick performing at the 2024 CentralWorld Bangkok Countdown on 31 December 2023

Patrick joined Zhejiang TV's new variety show Nice To Meet You as a regular cast member from April to June 2023. On 4 May, he was invited to participate in CCTV-6 Film Channel’s The 30th College Student Film Festival, a sidebar running alongside the Beijing International Film Festival and performed "Stars and Sea". On 29 June, Patrick released his first solo single "Sparkle", which he co-wrote with Yu Jiale. The following month, he held his first solo fan meeting "PATRICK 1st Fan Meeting in Bangkok" at Thunder Dome, Muang Thong Thani. The first one in Thailand was held on 22 July 2023, and sold out all 3,700 seats. From 2 July to 30 July, Patrick returned as one of the main cast in the third season of hit Chinese reality show Wonderland broadcast by Tencent Video. The same month, Patrick joined the sixth season of Chinese dating reality television show Heart Signal as a panelist, which was broadcast on Tencent Video from July to September 2023.

Patrick performed at the Summer Limited Refreshing Music Festival 2023 on 13 August, his first solo performance at a festival. On 21 August, it was announced that Patrick would be holding the Planet of Friends concert in Ho Chi Minh City, Vietnam on 10 September. Patrick performed at the Thai Hi Music Festival held on 26 August at the Orange Island Park in Changsha, organized by the Red Bull, TCP Group, Kuaishou, and jointly supported by the Tourism Authority of Thailand. In September, he entered Beijing Film Academy, the largest film institution in Asia. On 6 September, Patrick was selected as one of the four student representatives to deliver a speech at the opening ceremony of the 2023 class of Beijing Film Academy. On 25 September, Patrick attended the opening ceremony of 10th Silk Road International Film Festival and performed the song "Fu". On 29 September, Patrick participated in an episode of CCTV-5's "Big Shots with You" as a guest host to promote Asian Games with Olympic gold medalist athlete Qian Hong. On 11 November, E-Intent Official announced that Patrick would hold a concert to celebrate his 20th birthday titled 'A Magical Night' Patrick 20th Birthday Party. The concert was held at the Centerpoint Entertainment in Bangkok on 16 December. On 24 November, Patrick hosted the closing ceremony of the 22nd International Student Film and Video Festival (ISFVF). On 17 September 2024, he established his own studio, Yin Haoyu Studio.

On 1 January 2025, Patrick participated in an episode of Zhejiang TV's Jia Kang Jia Nian Wei Season 3. He officially released "Need Ya" through EE-Media on 25 April as the lead single from his debut mini-album Mint. On 24 May, Patrick signed an exclusive contract with EE-Media. He performed "Mint the World" and served as a trilingual host at the Weibo Cultural Exchange Night 2025 on 16 August. In October, Patrick starred alongside Shu Qi, Lee Sinje and Fu Meng-po in the Netflix original crime thriller television series The Resurrected. The role garnered him widespread acclaim, and his performance received positive reviews. Patrick continued to earn acclaim for his portrayal of a wide range of complex characters.

== Artistry ==
=== Influences and voice ===
Patrick cited Wang Yibo as his main musical influence and role model. Media outlets have labelled Patrick a versatile artist, with talent for singing, rapping, dancing and songwriting. Since his debut with INTO1, Patrick's voice has received acknowledgement in the C-pop industry for its distinct vocal timbre. Following Patrick's performance on Wonderland S2, Patrick has earned praise for his vocal talent. He also has received praise for his stage presence and voice during live performances.

== Public image ==
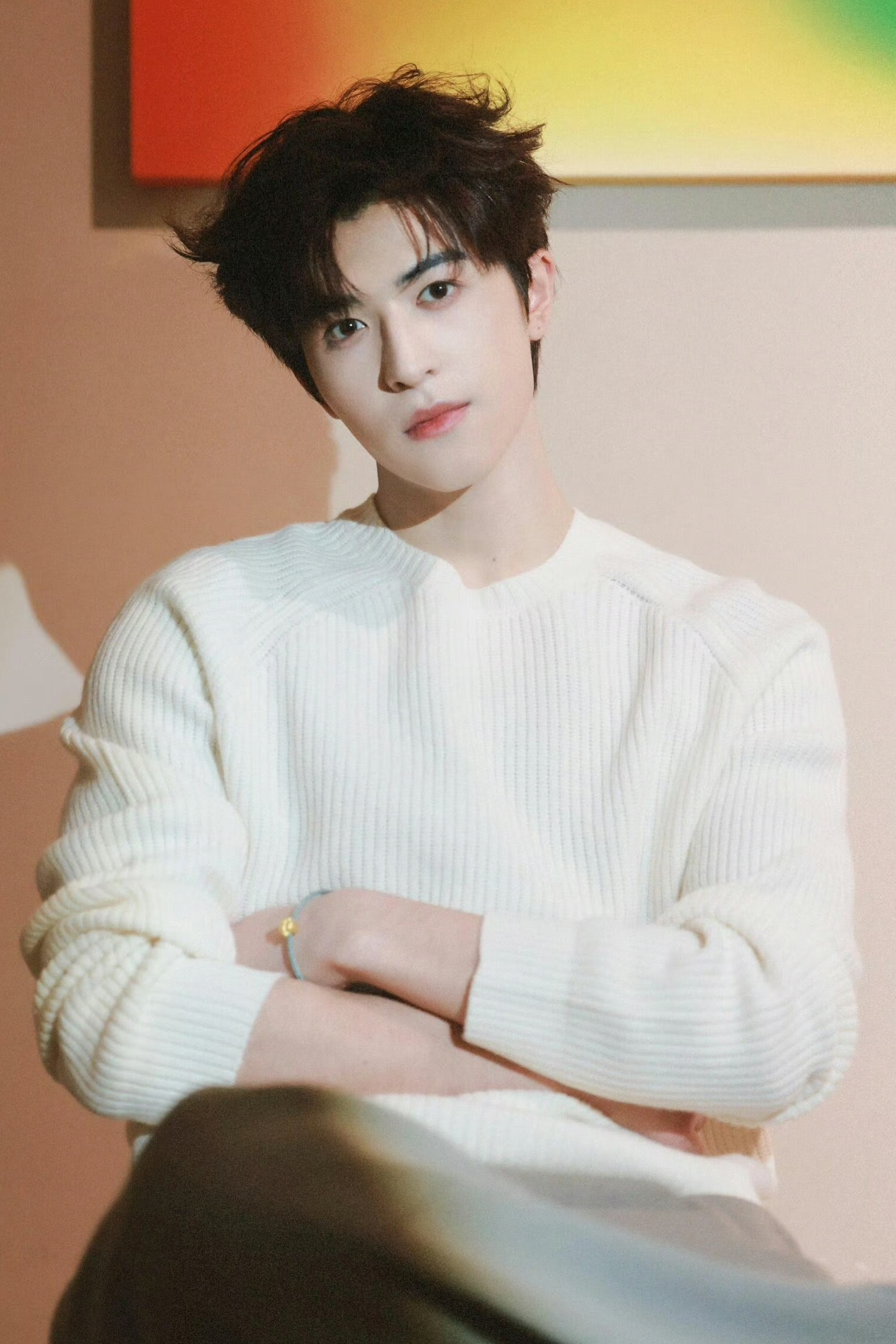
Patrick in December 2024

=== Influence ===
Patrick is an in-demand endorser in China, with numerous brand deals. He endorses a wide range of products, including food and beverages, daily necessities and hygiene products, fashion and beauty, mobile applications, shopping malls, and more. Following his rise in popularity in 2021, Patrick became one of the most in-demand endorsers in China. From performance to visual media, Patrick is an all-rounder artist. Brands often cite his positivity, unique sensibility and style and cultural influence as reasons for why they choose Patrick to represent them. Patrick has also been recognized for his fashion sense.

In 2021, Patrick was ranked sixth on the "10 Most Celebrity of the Year" list by TC Candler. In the same year, Patrick was among Twitter's Top 10 Most Tweeted about hashtags in the Thailand. He was ranked 47th as The 100 Most Handsome and Beautiful in the World Of 2022 Year, Ranked By 'The Independent Critics TC Candler'.

He has appeared on various Chinese entertainment shows such as Wonderland 2, It Sounds Incredible 2, Informal Talks 7, The Detectives' Adventures 3, and Heart Signal 6. Patrick was praised for his sense of entertainment and fluent Chinese. Chinese media has complimented his "sense of entertainment" and praised his "outstanding Chinese skills that are different from those from other idol groups".

=== Ambassadorships ===
In 2020, Patrick served as a presenter for World AIDS Day in Thailand, acting as a campaign presenter for the Thai Red Cross Society's AIDS Research Centre. In January 2022, Patrick was named one of Tencent's Winter Olympics Report Snow Dance ambassadors for the 2022 Winter Olympics and 2022 Winter Paralympics. In March 2023, Patrick was appointed as the China-Thailand Cultural Exchange Ambassador by the Royal Thai Embassy in Beijing.

== Personal life ==
Patrick came to China in 2021 and is known to have high-level Chinese proficiency. When asked about his language skills in Tencent Video's Produce Camp 2021, he answered, "I think learning ancient Chinese poems helps a lot. It will not just help me to learn the language, but also get me closer to the culture and history." His Chinese Proficiency level was certified in 2022 when he gained Level 5 out of 6 overall in the HSK Chinese Proficiency Test and passed the HSKK Chinese Speaking Test Intermediate Level with a high score.

Because of his work in the entertainment industry in Thailand, China and the rest of the world, Patrick is multilingual; he speaks fluent Thai, German, English and Chinese. He also knows basic Japanese and has learned to speak French.

== Other ventures ==
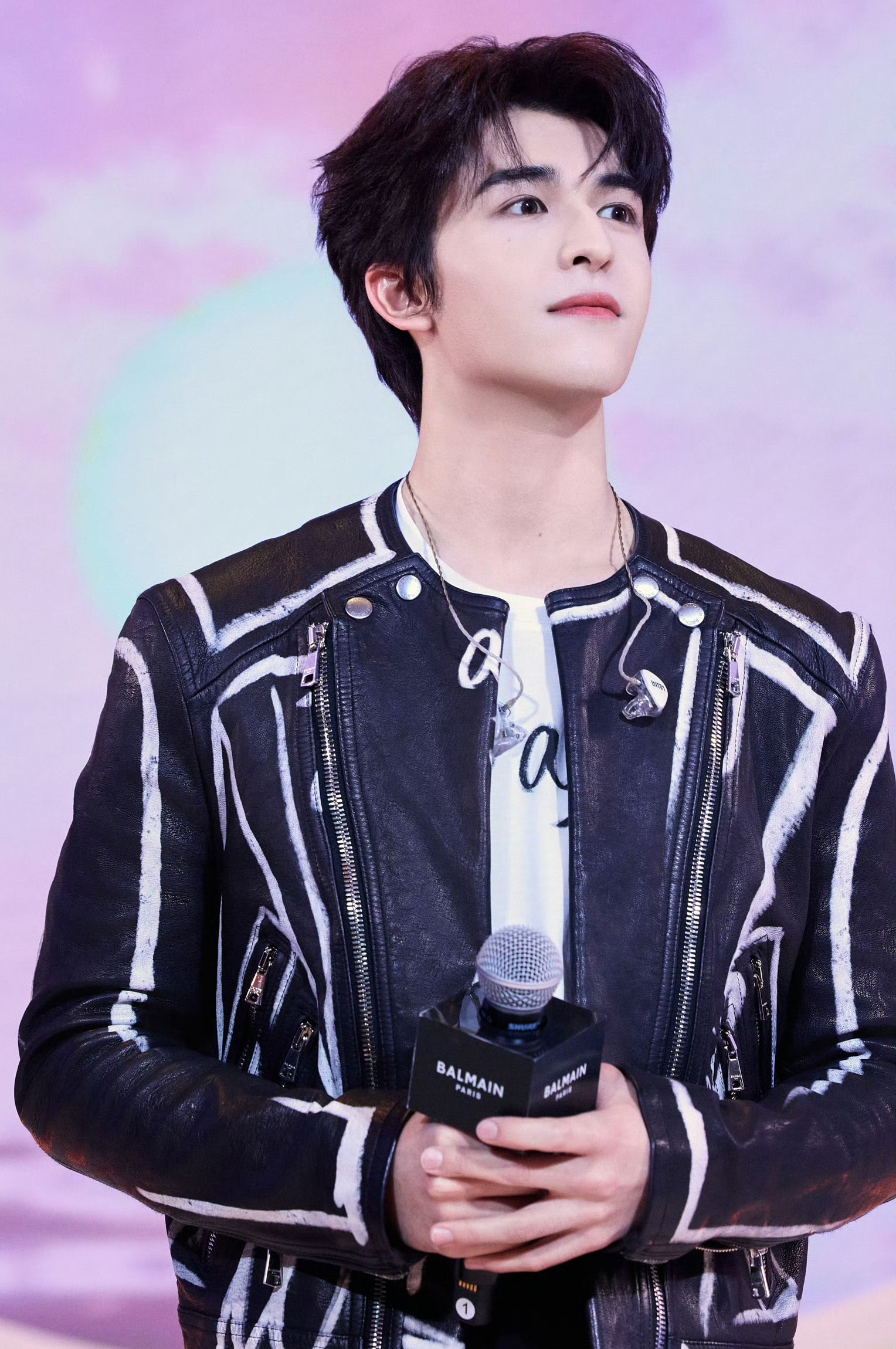
Patrick for Balmain at the Plaza 66 in November 2024

=== Endorsements ===
Aside from various endorsements with his bandmates, Patrick has promoted various products and featured in numerous advertisements. In 2020, he became the face of Clean & Clear in Thailand. During his trainee period, he appeared in advertising campaigns for brands including Chunzhen, Darlie, Volkswagen, Biotherm, and MaskFamily. In April 2021, he was appointed as one of the brand spokespersons for Chunzhen and also became the youth innovation officer for the video platform Kuaishou. On 16 May, Patrick was announced as a brand ambassador for Atelier Cologne. On 22 May, Patrick was selected as the first-ever youth ambassador for My Foodie, a Chinese pet food company that produces dog and cat food. On 27 May, Nestlé-owned nesQino named Patrick its first-ever brand ambassador. Starting from the summer of 2021, Patrick has been actively participating in numerous offline events for the brands he represents. In June, Patrick was announced as the youth brand ambassador for Kiehl's, under the L'Oréal Group. In September, Patrick was appointed Chinese Trend Ambassador of the Bicester Village Shopping Collection, which cited his fashion sense, attitude, and widespread influence among younger audiences. He was also featured in videos that promoted the campaign. He served as a muse and the face of several of the outlet's major promotional campaigns. Later that month, he became one of the brand spokespersons for Pocky in China. On 18 October, he was officially named by the brand as the Friend of the 3CE Stylenanda.

On 27 February 2022, Kérastase Paris announced Patrick as its brand experience officer. The next day, Patrick was selected as the brand ambassador for Hanhoo's sunscreen. In May 2022, he became the brand ambassador for Juyou. He has appeared multiple times in commercial videos for Satine, a brand under the Yili Group, one of China's largest dairy companies, and has also appeared in advertisements for Dulux. In September 2022, Patrick was announced as the Ideal brand ambassador of Good Hair Day 185°C.

In June 2023, Patrick was appointed promotional ambassador for Chi Forest (previously known as Genki Forest) Ice Tea. In July 2023, he has appeared in commercials for Dulux and KUKA. On 20 September 2023, Patrick was officially selected as the Tmall luxury art exhibition ambassador for Alibaba Group's e-commerce platform Tmall. On 25 September 2023, Patrick was appointed as the brand ambassador for Red Bull Energy Drink, owned by TCP Group, with the brand citing Patrick's positive image across various fields. He also became the face of Red Bull's latest campaign in China. Additionally, Patrick was featured in several advertisements and has promoted various brands and products such as VS Sassoon, Yves Saint Laurent Beauté, Tom Ford Beauty and more.

In December 2024, Patrick was named a Friend of Tmall by the Chinese e-commerce platform and was selected as the face of Kiehl's Ultra Adventurer campaign in January 2025.

=== Fashion ===
As a trainee at Produce Camp 2021 in early 2021, Patrick has appeared in numerous magazines, including Esquire, GQ, Cosmopolitan, Bazaar, and Elle. In May 2021, he became one of the brand ambassadors for Gentle Monster. On 13 May 2021, Swiss watch and jewelry brand Piaget announced Patrick as the latest Friend of the brand. In June 2021, Patrick appeared in a fashion campaign for Fila x Lanvin. In July 2021, he was appointed as one of the Elegant creative officer for Longines. Patrick has collaborated with global luxury brands including Balmain and Valentino. On 29 October 2021, he was invited to attend the opening event for Balmain's new boutique flagship store in Shanghai. In December 2021, Patrick has appeared in magazines such as Harper's Bazaar Men and Elle. He also appeared in a fashion campaign for luxury brand Balmain.

In February 2022, Patrick has appeared as the face of advertising campaigns and brand ambassador for Valentino. He also promoted the brand's Resort 2022 Collection, wearing Valentino Garavani's Locò bag. On 7 March 2022, Patrick was invited as one of special guests to attend the 13th annual Bazaar Jewelry Award held in Shanghai. In August 2022, Patrick embarked on his first collaboration project with Sina Fashion for the Qixi Festival. On 4 September 2022, French luxury fashion house Balmain appointed Patrick as the first male Friend of the brand in China and he did a photoshoot for the brand's Balmain x Pokémon limited-edition collection. He also attended reopening of Balmain's WF Central boutique in Beijing. In November 2022, he attended Pomellato's exhibition at the SKP-S in Beijing.

On 1 March 2023, Patrick attended Balmain's Womenswear Fall-Winter 2023 Fashion Show, held during the 2023 Paris Fashion Week at Le Carreau Du Temple. On 3 March 2023, Patrick was personally invited by Olivier Rousteing to attend the Balmain Fall/Winter 2023 Men's Presentation in Paris. Also he has received nickname "Balmain Prince". Patrick cemented his long-term partnership with Balmain. In December 2023, Patrick was officially announced as "Friends of the House" of Balmain, which he also appeared in an exclusive campaign of the brand.

He has featured on the cover of many magazines such as Men's Health, Men's Uno Young, WAVES漫潮, OK! 精彩 and more. In July 2024, Patrick attend the Balmain x Disney's pop-up store in Hong Kong. In November 2024, Patrick attended an event with French fashion house Balmain in Shanghai.

In addition, he has appeared on the covers of numerous fashion magazines, including Madame Figaro, SuperELLE, Southern Metropolis Entertainment, CHAMPION, Nylon, Life Style, SEASON, Billboard, and Ray Li. Patrick appeared in Fantastic Man magazine in 2025 and was later featured in Man About Town magazine in January 2026. In September, he appeared on the cover of NYLON China.

== Impact and influence ==
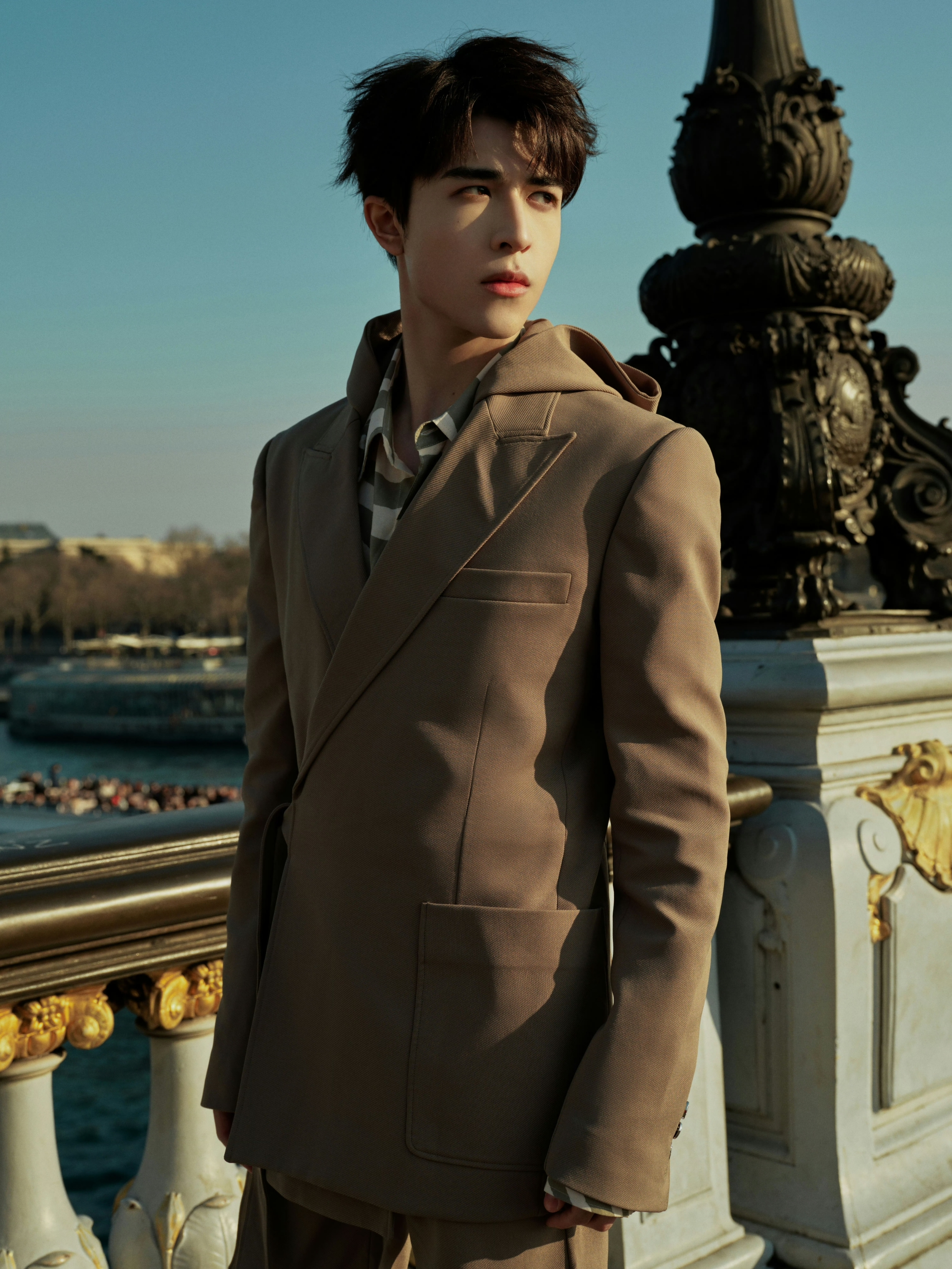
Patrick in March 2023

The popularity of Patrick have led his to endorsing several brands, he has gained recognition as a sought-after endorser by various local and international brands. Patrick's commercial influence and marketing potential have been noted by media outlets. Some companies have reported a notable increase in sales after collaborating with Patrick. In 2021, he topped Ai Man's Data Star's Business Value list for the month of April to June. After he was appointed as the youth brand ambassador for My Foodie's Pet food, the brand's sales record surpassed the previous year, as well as topping the most popular Chinese brands list for Tmall 6.18. He made more than 24 million yuan in 2021 with more than 7 endorsement deals in a few months. Upon landing his first solo magazine cover shoot with Men's Health China for their November 2021 issue, the magazine's distributor reported that all 24,000 printed and in-stock copies sold out within minutes. His partnership with Balmain emerged as one of the brand's most iconic global celebrity features in 2021. In addition, Patrick become one of the most in-demand endorsers among young consumers for his outstanding performance skills.

Patrick has been topping various charts for consecutive weeks and months since his breakthrough. In 2022, he topping the "Brand Endorsement List" published by the Zhiku Xingtu, a chart that tracks Chinese celebrities with the most online searches and engagements. In 2023, he topped 'Brand Endorsement List' published by the Zhiku Xingtu several times.

== Philanthropy ==
Patrick engages in numerous philanthropic activities, promoting various causes such as animal welfare, health, children, education, sports, and disability advocacy.

== Filmography ==
=== Film ===
Year	English title	Original title	Role	Notes	Ref.
2023	Delicious Romance	爱很美味	Luo kk (罗 kk)	Main role	
TBA	Huadan Rapper Go Go Go †	五个花旦的少年	Jin Sheng	Main role	

=== Television series ===
Year	English title	Original title	Role	Network	Notes	Ref.
2020	The Gifted: Graduation	นักเรียนพลังกิฟต์	Tharm Thamrongsawat (Time)	GMM25	Main role	
2020	Angel Beside Me	เทวดาท่าจะรัก	Cupid	GMM25	Support role	
2020	I'm Tee, Me Too	คนละทีเดียวกัน	T-Bone	GMM25	Guest role	
2025	The Resurrected	回魂計	Eason	Netflix	Main role	
2025	Speed and Love	双轨	Liang Yanfeng	iQiyi	Support role	
2026	A Ming Dynasty Adventure †	明月录	Ding Wu	Hunan TV, Mango TV	Main role	
2026	Dancing With The Tide †	何不同舟渡	Zhang Yuehui	Hunan TV, Mango TV	Main role	
2026	The Killing of Begonia †	海棠春	Zheng Yan	Hunan TV, Mango TV	Lead role	

Key
†	Denotes television productions that have not yet been released

=== Variety show ===
Year	English title	Original title	Role	Network	Notes	Ref.
2019	Go On Girl & Guy Star Search		Contestant	GMMTV	Finished 1st (Boy)	
2019	Beauty & The Babes 2		Contestant	GMMTV	Finished 1st (Boy)	
2021	Produce Camp 2021	创造营2021	Contestant	Tencent	Finished 9th	
2021	Happy Camp	快乐大本营	Guest	Hunan TV	20 April, 5 June	
2021	Great Escape 3	密室大逃脱3	Guest; Performer	Mango TV		
2021	The Treasure	谁是宝藏歌手	Guest; Performer	Hunan TV		
2021	Flash Cafe	闪电咖啡馆	Guest	Shanghai TV		
2021	The Coming One 5	明日之子5	Senior guest	Tencent	Episodes 5, 6	
2021	Super Novae Games 4	超新星运动会4	Regular Member, Guest host	Tencent	Contestant; Team Overseas	
2022	Goose Gala	家族年年年夜FAN	Regular Member	Tencent		
2022	Wonderland 2	五十公里桃花坞2	Cast Member	Tencent	10 Episodes	
2022	We Are The Champions	战至巅峰	Guest	Tencent		
2022	It Sounds Incredible 2	听说很好吃2	Guest	Zhejiang TV	2 Episodes	
2022	Informal Talks 7	非正式会谈7	Guest	Bilibili, Hubei TV	10 Episodes	
2022	Bilibili Go	哔哩哔哩向前冲	Guest	Bilibili	9 Episodes	
2022	It Sounds Incredible 2	听说很好吃2	Guest	Zhejiang TV	12 Episodes	
2022	Campus Go	沸腾校园	Senior guest	Tencent	Episodes 7, 8	
2022	The Ambassador of Our World; Life is Coming	我们的世界生活 之大使来了	Guest	BRTV		
2022	Rising Land	朝阳打歌中心	Guest	Youku		
2022	Join Our Concert	来看我们的演唱会	Guest	Tencent		
2023	Jia Kang Jia Nian Wei	加康加年味	Guest	Zhejiang TV	3 Episodes	
2023	Spring Melody	春天的旋律	Guest	Nanning TV		
2023	Nice To Meet You	当我们遇见你	Main Host	Zhejiang TV	8 Episodes	
2023	Keep Running 11	奔跑吧11	Guest	Zhejiang TV	4 Episodes	
2023	The Detectives' Adventures 3	萌探探探案3	Guest	iQiyi	Episodes 7, 8	
2023	Wonderland 3	五十公里桃花坞3	Cast Member	Tencent	Episodes 6–10	
2023	The Journey of Poetic Soul 4	还有诗和远方4	Guest	Zhejiang TV	6 Episodes	
2023	Heart Signal 6	心动的信号6	Main Host, Panelist	Tencent	Episodes 0–10	
2023	It Sounds Incredible 3	听说很好吃3	Guest	Zhejiang TV	5 Episodes	
2024	Today Show	ทูเดย์โชว์	Guest	Channel 3 HD		
2024	It Sounds Incredible 4	听说很好吃4	Guest	Zhejiang TV		
2025	Jia Kang Jia Nian Wei 3	加康加年味3	Cast Member	Zhejiang TV		
2025	Run for Time 5	全员加速中5	Cast Member	Hunan TV, Mango TV	Episodes 1–3, 5, 9, 11–12	
2025	Chinese Restaurant 9	中餐厅9	Cast Member	Hunan TV, Mango TV		
2025	Forest Evolutionism 3	森林进化论2025	Cast Member	Mango TV	S1: Episodes 5–8 S2: Episodes 7–12	
2025	Hello, Saturday	你好，星期六	Guest	Hunan TV, Mango TV		
2025	Our Dormitories	我们的宿舍	Guest	Mango TV	Episodes 11	
2025	Deep into the Wild 3	向山海出发3	Cast Member	Zhejiang TV	Episodes 4–6	
2025	Flavorful Journey 2	姜姜好2	Guest	Hunan TV, Mango TV	Episodes 7–12	
2025	Thai Sweet	泰甜啦	Cast Member	iQiyi	Episodes 8–12	

== Discography ==
=== Extended plays ===
List of extended plays, with selected details, chart positions and sales
Title	Details	Peak chart positions	Sales
Title	Details	CHN	Sales
Mint	Released: October 17, 2025; Label: EE-Media; Formats: CD, digital download, streaming; Track listing: 1. Need Ya; 2. Mint the World; 3. Summer Time; 4. To You; 5. Non-stop; 6. Talking Bodies	—	—

=== Singles ===
Title	Year	Peak chart positions		Album
Title	Year	CHN	US World	Album
As lead artist
"Sparkle" (闪闪)	2023	42	—	Non-album single
"123 I Love U" (123变成你的最爱)	2024	—	—	Non-album single
"Need Ya"	2025	—	—	Mint
Collaborations
"Just Right 2023" (刚好2023) (with cast members)	2023	—	—	Theme song for variety show Wonderland Season 3
Soundtrack appearances
"Sun Will Never Set" (日不落)	2022	—	—	听说很好吃2 OST
"Roof on Fire" (屋顶着火) (with Wu Xuanyi)	2022	—	—	听说很好吃2 OST, Cover of Victoria Song
"Unfinished Love Letter" (半封情书)	2023	—	—	Sweet Games OST
Promotional singles
"Echoes of Ancient Shu" (古蜀回响) (with Santa, Rikimaru and Mika)	2021	—	—	Promotional song for Sanxingdui Cultural Site
"New Era, Winter Olympics" (新时代 冬奥运)	2021	—	—	Promotional song for 2022 Beijing Winter Olympics and Paralympics
"Chinese Dream, My Dream" (中国梦·我的梦)	2022	—	—	Promotional song for 2022 China Online Audiovisual Annual Festival
"Warm Blood Makes the Ink" (热血为墨)	2023	—	—	Promotional song for Henan TV New Year Eve Gala
"—" denotes releases that did not chart or were not released in that region.

=== Other charted songs ===
List of other charted songs, showing year released, selected chart positions, and name of the album
Title	Year	Peak (TME Uni Chart)		Album
Title	Year	CHN	Score	Album
"Run into You" (遇到)	2022	19	91.56	Non-album single
"—" denotes releases that did not chart or were not released in that region.

=== Songwriting credits ===
List of songs written, with year released, artist, song name, and album name
Year	Artist	Song	Album	Lyricist	Composer
2021	Himself	"Way Up"	Non-album single	Yes	Yes
2021	Himself	"Thinking 'bout You"	Non-album single	Yes	Yes
2022	Himself	"Perfect Night"	Non-album single	Yes	Yes
2022	Himself	"Can't Help Falling In Love"	Non-album single	Yes	Yes
2022	Himself	"You and Me"	Non-album single	Yes	Yes
2022	INTO1	"Together Somewhere" (一杯火焰)	Into the clouds	Yes	Yes
2023	INTO1	"Everything" (没有拥抱的合照)	Grown up	Yes	No
2023	Himself	"Sparkle" (闪闪)	Non-album single	Yes	Yes
2023	Himself	"Perfect Sunrise"	Non-album single	Yes	Yes
2025	Himself	"Talking Bodies"	Mint	Yes	No

== Live performances ==
=== Concerts and fan meetings ===
Title	Date	City	Country	Venue	Ref.
Krukoy and The Gang presents Let’s be Heroes Concert	13 October 2019	Bangkok	Thailand	M Theatre	
Doki Fan Meeting	9 April 2021	Haikou	China	–	
ChunZhen Fan Meeting	19 June 2021	Hangzhou	China	–	
051 Concert	25 February 2023	Suzhou	China	Huayi Brothers Movie World	
INTO1 2023 "Grown up" Concert	1 – 2 April 2023	Bangkok	Thailand	Union Hall, Union Mall	
INTO1 2023 "Grown up" Concert	7 April 2023	Tokyo	Japan	Shibuya Marui	
INTO1 2023 "Grown up" Concert	21 – 22 April 2023	Shanghai	China	Mercedes-Benz Arena	
PATRICK 1st Fan Meeting in Bangkok	22 July 2023	Bangkok	Thailand	Thunder Dome	
Planet of Friends Concert	10 September 2023	Ho Chi Minh City	Vietnam	Thu Duc City People’s Committee	
Patrick 20th Birthday Party "A Magical Night"	16 December 2023	Bangkok	Thailand	Centerpoint Studio	
Patrick 21st in Shanghai	19 October 2024	Shanghai	China	Himalayas Art Center	

=== Music festivals ===
Event	Date	City	Country	Venue	Ref.
Summer Limited Refreshing Music Festival 2023	13 August 2023	Zhengzhou	China	Yinjile Seawater World	
Thai Hi Music Festival	26 August 2023	Changsha	China	Orange Island Park	
CentralwOrld Bangkok Countdown 2024	31 December 2023	Bangkok	Thailand	CentralWorld	

=== Award shows ===
Event	Date	City	Country	Venue	Ref.
The 28th Chinese Top Ten Music Awards	17 November 2021	Shanghai	China	SMG Shanghai TV	
ELLE Style Awards 2021	18 November 2021	Shanghai	China	–	
The 3rd Tencent Music Entertainment Awards	11 December 2021	Macau	China	–	
Weibo Music Awards 2022	18 January 2023	Beijing	China	–	

=== Television shows and specials ===
Event	Date	City	Country	Venue	Ref.
521 Viya Carnival	21 May 2021	Hangzhou	China	–	
Kuaishou 616	15 June 2021	Nanjing	China	–	
Super 818 Car Carnival Night	18 August 2021	Hangzhou	China	–	
Kuaishou 1001 Nights Gala 2021	27 February 2022	Nanjing	China	–	

=== Other live performances ===
Event	Date	City	Country	Venue	Ref.
The 3rd Lushan International Romance Film Week	20 August 2022	Jiangxi	China	–	
The 21st Chinese Bridge	1 November 2022	Beijing	China	BRTV	
The 30th College Student Film Festival	4 May 2023	Beijing	China	China Movie Channel, CCTV-6	

== Events ==
Year	Title	Date	Venue	Ref.
2021	Piaget Offline Event and Livestream Event	13 May	Piaget Boutique, China	
2021	Atelier Cologne Offline Event	17 June	Atelier Cologne Boutique, Hangzhou, China	
2021	Balmain Spring Summer 2022 Fashion Show	30 September	Live	
2021	Patrick 18th Birthday Fan Meeting at The Bicester Village Shopping Collection (First Ambassador of China)	19 October	The Bicester Village Shopping Collection (TBVSC) Suzhou Village, China	
2021	Balmain Shanghai Store Opening Event	29 October	Balmain Boutique, Shanghai Plaza 66 Store, China	
2021	Valentino Re-Signify Part Two: Exhibition in Beijing	2 November	Beijing Exhibition, SKP-S Department; Store, Beijing, China	
2022	CGTN Spring Festival 2022; Chinese New Year Celebrations for expats in China	29 January	China Global Television Network CGTN	
2022	Valentino Nanjing Deji Plaza	11 February	Valentino Boutique; Nanjing Deji Plaza Store, China	
2022	The 13th Annual BAZAAR Jewelry Award	7 March	JW Marriott Marquis, Shanghai, China	
2022	Zhongxin entertainment (中新文娱)	20 April	Phoenix Chinese News and Entertainment Channel	
2022	Patrick x Sina Fashion (The Qixi Festival)	4 August	Sina Fashion	
2022	"Read A Poem" Mid-Autumn Festival: Patrick read a Chinese poem written by Su Shi	9 September	China Global Television Network CGTN	
2022	Pomellato "意" Exhibition in Beijing	22 November	Beijing Exhibition, SKP-S Department; Store, Beijing, China	
2023	Thai Festival in Beijing 2023	March ️11	Royal Thai Embassy, Beijing, China	

== Magazine ==
Year	Name	Published month	Ref.
2021	Madame Figaro Hommes	May	
2021	SuperELLE	August	
2021	南都娱乐 Southern Metropolis Entertainment	August	
2021	CHAMPION 体育画报	September; Special Olympics	
2021	NYLON尼龙	October	
2021	Men's Health 男士健康	November	
2021	BAZAARMEN	December; Inside pages	
2021	ELLE	December; Super Novae Games 2021	
2021	WAVES漫潮	December	
2022	Rollacoaster	January	
2022	时尚COSMO	February; Special Valentine's Day	
2022	Life Style 精品购物指南	INTO1 1st Anniversary Edition	
2022	Men's Uno Young (风度)	May	
2022	新浪时尚 Sina Fashion	August; Special The Qixi Festival	
2022	新视线Wonderland	August	
2022	伊周BELLA	August	
2022	SEASON Magazine	October	
2022	OK! 精彩	October	
2023	Praew Magazine (แพรว)	March; No.922	
2023	Billboard China	March	
2023	IDOU	April	
2023	HER STYLE	May	
2023	RAYLI	May	
2023	SUDSAPDA (สุดสัปดาห์)	July	

== Awards and nominations ==
Name of the award ceremony, year presented, category, nominee of the award, and the result of the nomination
Award ceremony	Year	Category	Nominee / Work	Result	Ref.
Line TV Awards	2021	Best Viral Scene	The Gifted: Graduation	Nominated	
Super Novae Games	2021	Go-karting Race	Patrick	Won	
Super Novae Games	2021	Obstacle Course Race	Patrick	2nd place	
Mellow Pop	2021	Mellow Top Idol Chart December	Patrick	Won	
WeTV Awards	2021	Artist of the Year	Patrick	Won	
JOOX Thailand Music Awards	2022	Top ROOMS of the Year	Patrick	Nominated	
Weibo TV and Internet Video Summit	2022	Best Creative	Wonderland S2	Won	
Thai Festival in Beijing	2023	China-Thailand Cultural Exchange Ambassador	Patrick	Won	
Sanook Top of the Year Awards	2023	Popular Vote	Patrick	Won	
Weibo Music Awards	2025	Stage Breakthrough Artist of the Year	Patrick	Won	
Thairath Awards	2025	Rising Star of the Year	Patrick	Nominated	
Golden Mango Awards	2025	Golden Mango Artist of the Year	Patrick	Won	
