= Cao Xuanxuan's Love Journey =

- Chinese: 了不起的曹萱萱
- Hanyu Pinyin: Liǎobuqǐ de Cáo Xuānxuān
- Genre: Period drama、Detective drama
- Written by: Li Min; Zhang Zixuan (Head Writer); Ye Shu; Jiang Jiujiu
- Directed by: Liu Xing
- Starring: Zhu Xudan, Zhai Xiaowen, Guo Cheng, Xu Muchan
- Opening theme: Tomorrow Never Again (明日不復) - Qin Zimo
- Ending theme: Pool Fish and Reflection (池魚與倒影) - Lu Yi
- Country of origin: China
- Original language: Mandarin
- No. of episodes: 21

Production
- Producers: Li La, Cao Rui, Huang Rixing, Zhang Ziqing, Zhu Min
- Production location: Hengdian World Studios
- Running time: approximately 35 minutes
- Production companies: Tencent Video; Beijing Mizhi Film and Television Co., Ltd

Original release
- Network: Tencent Video
- Release: 13 January 2025 – present

Cao Xuanxuan's Love Journey (Chinese: 了不起的曹萱萱) is a Chinese period detective drama television series that premiered on Tencent Video on January 13, 2025. Directed by Liu Xing with co-directors Cao Junlang and Li Shituo, written by Li Min and Zhang Zixuan, and starring Zhu Xudan, Zhai Xiaowen, Guo Cheng, and Xu Muchan. It also features Ying Haoming and Wei Wei in special guest roles.

== Plot ==
The series tells the story of Zhou Na, a modern mystery novelist, who suddenly loses consciousness while reading the "Yan City Diary." When she awakens, she finds herself transported to ancient Yan City, where she becomes the prospective wife of County Magistrate Guo Zijie. Together, the pair repeatedly solve mysterious cases. As their mutual affection deepens and their emotional bond grows stronger, a deadly conspiracy involving life and death gradually emerges.

== Cast ==
=== Main Characters ===
Actor	Character	Description
Zhu Xudan	Cao Xuanxuan	The identity that Zhou Na takes after traveling to ancient times. She is the prospective wife of County Magistrate Guo Zijie in Yan City. Intelligent and quick-witted with sharp thinking, she possesses modern perspectives and a strong sense of self. While gradually adapting to ancient life, she reveals her resilience and bravery, never backing down from difficulties or dangers, and is determined to uncover the truth.
Zhai Xiaowen	Guo Zijie	County Magistrate of Yan City and Cao Xuanxuan's husband. Upright, brave, and known for his clean administration, he is deeply loved by the people. He combines a comedic style of playing dumb with a charming and affectionate persona. When facing cases, he is intelligent and decisive, quickly grasping the situation at hand and analyzing complex clues.
Guo Cheng	Sun Weiyan	The county magistrate's advisor. Clever and resourceful, he is completely loyal to Guo Zijie and serves as his capable right-hand man, playing an important role in handling county government affairs and solving cases.
Xu Muchan	He Chun	A straightforward and martial female coroner. Professional, calm, meticulous and careful, she excels at her work. Her examination and analysis of corpses are extremely accurate, providing important clues for solving cases.

=== Supporting Characters ===
Actor	Character	Description
Li Zixuan	Zhao Xiaolin	Straightforward and energetic. She is full of enthusiasm in life and is always willing to help her friends—a true warm-hearted person. In her work, she is driven and constantly improves herself through effort. She never backs down from difficulties and influences those around her with an optimistic attitude.
Song Xinran	Ruohui	Cao Xuanxuan's personal maid. With a gentle and obedient nature, she is deeply loyal and always stays by Cao Xuanxuan's side. When Cao Xuanxuan becomes involved in case investigations, she not only carefully tends to her daily needs but also provides silent support when she's in trouble, helping her convey messages and organize clues. Although she doesn't understand coroner work or investigation techniques, she observes the household carefully with her delicate sensibilities, and has repeatedly awakened Cao Xuanxuan with simple but profound words, making her an indispensable helper.
Ying Haoming		Special Guest
Wei Wei		Special Guest
Feng Chuxuan		Friendship Appearance

== Soundtrack ==
The original soundtrack was released in January 2025.

Song Title	Lyrics	Composer	Artist	Remarks
Tomorrow Never Again (明日不復)	Xiuyu	Ewcn Er Wen	Qin Zimo	Opening Theme
Pool Fish and Reflection (池魚與倒影)	Twelve Brothers, Lu Yi	Zhao RR	Lu Yi	Ending Theme
Eyebrows (畫眉)	He Shiyao, Shi Man	Xinmiao	Qin Zimo	Interlude

== Production ==
=== Filming ===
On September 10, 2022, the drama began production at Hengdian World Studios. On October 26, the production was completed. In the fourth quarter of 2024, the drama received its broadcasting license.

=== Production Team ===
- Producers: Pipi Li, Wang Zijie, Zhang Ziqing, Zhao Chen, Wang Heran, Wen Jier, Shao Yu, Wang Chaoguang, Luo Yating, Fu Lei, Xie Fang
- Chief Producers: Li La, Pipi Li
- Producers: Cao Rui, Huang Rixing, Zhang Ziqing, Zhu Min, Yan Yuchen
- Co-Producers: Mao Yonghui, Zhou Xiaoyi, Zhou Lujie
- Executive Producer: An Zhihui
- Director: Liu Xing
- Co-Directors: Cao Junlang, Li Shituo
- Chief Supervisors: Wang Juan, Pipi Li
- Cinematography: Chen Wei, Xu Gongqi
- Editing: Wang Zhanying
- Props: Pan Zesheng
- Art Direction: Li Fu'an
- Action Director: Zhang Shaohua
- Costume Design: Han Fengyuan
- Wardrobe Design: Ma Youhua
- Visual Effects: Li Xuebiao
- Lighting: Wang Shuaibing, Tian Yang
- Sound Recording: Ren Xiaobo, Tong Hongjian

=== Related Companies ===
Company Type	Company Name
Production Companies	Shenzhen Tencent Computer Systems Co., Ltd
Production Companies	Yangzhou Nai Yi Film and Television Co., Ltd
Production Companies	Shanghai Siba Film and Television Co., Ltd
Production Companies	Beijing Mizhi Film and Television Co., Ltd
Production Companies	Beijing Qimao Film and Television Co., Ltd
Production Companies	Jiuzhou Dream Factory International Culture Communication Co., Ltd
Production Companies	Zhongyou Flying (Beijing) Cultural Technology Co., Ltd
Production Companies	Corn Porridge (Beijing) Cultural Communication Co., Ltd
Production Companies	Qingdao Guangshu Film and Television Co., Ltd
Post-Production Companies	Audio Production: Haohao Production (Beijing) Film and Television Culture Co., Ltd
Post-Production Companies	Visual Effects: Beijing Chengshen Jiayi Culture Media Co., Ltd
Post-Production Companies	Post-Production Management: Blue Sea Starfield (Beijing) Film and Television Co., Ltd

== Broadcasting and Promotion ==
=== Promotional Activities ===
On October 29, 2022, the drama released a behind-the-scenes special; on December 31, 2024, the drama opened reservations; on January 1, 2025, it was selected for Tencent Video's 2025 Major Drama Lineup; on January 6, the drama released its first trailer; on January 10, it released the premiere trailer; on January 11, it released the opening theme "Tomorrow Never Again" MV; on January 12, it released the ending theme "Pool Fish and Reflection"; on January 13, it released character posters; on January 17, it released a viewing calendar.

=== Broadcasting Information ===
Broadcast Platform	Premiere Date	Broadcast Schedule	Status
Tencent Video	January 13, 2025	Members receive 1 new episode daily at 12:00 noon. First release of 6 episodes, with additional episodes January 17–19. Starting January 20, non-members receive 1 episode daily, with first release of 2 episodes.	Completed

== Reception ==
=== Audience Ratings ===
Platform	Rating	Number of Reviews	As of
Tencent Video	8.5/10	94,000	May 25, 2025
Douban	5.2/10	1,315	May 25, 2025

=== Critical reception ===
Cao Xuanxuan's Love Journey combines fantasy, time travel, mystery, detective work, light humor, and romance elements into one. While being comedic, it maintains suspense throughout, presenting audiences with an ancient Chinese world full of surprises and emotion. Since its premiere, the drama has garnered attention for its unique subject matter and plot. With its core concept of the female protagonist traveling from the modern era to ancient times to investigate cases, the series breaks away from traditional male-centered detective narratives, creating a differentiated story structure. The romantic storyline running throughout the series contains multiple emotional dimensions, with the relationship conflicts between the main characters and interactions between supporting character couples constructing a rich emotional landscape.
