= Dear Parents (TV series) =

2021 Chinese television series

- Chinese: 親愛的爸媽
- Hanyu Pinyin: Qīn'ài de bà mā
- Genre: Period drama、Family drama
- Written by: Ulannuorisong; Li Xiang; Qin Ye
- Directed by: Shi Chengye; Wang Rui Xin
- Starring: Yan Ni; Wang Yanzhui; Zhang Yijie; Zhai Xiaowen
- Opening theme: Heart Toward Sunshine (心若向陽)
- Ending theme: Embrace (擁抱)
- Country of origin: China
- Original language: Mandarin
- No. of episodes: 43

Production
- Executive producer: Yin Xianjin
- Producer: Yang Bei、Fang Fang
- Production location: Beijing
- Running time: approximately 45 minutes
- Production companies: Tencent Video; Wanda Film & Television Media Co., Ltd; Huoerguosi New Media Chengpin Culture Media Co., Ltd

Original release
- Network: Beijing Satellite Television; Tencent Video iQIYI
- Release: 10 August 2021 – 2021

Dear Parents (Chinese: 親愛的爸媽) is a Chinese period family drama television series that premiered on Beijing Satellite Television on August 10, 2021. Directed by Shi Chengye and Wang Ruixin, written by Ulannuorisong and Li Xiang, and starring Yan Ni, Wang Yanzhui, Zhang Yijie, and Zhai Xiaowen. The series airs simultaneously on Tencent Video and iQIYI.

== Plot ==
The series centers on a blended family, telling the story of Liu Biyun and Jiang Tianhuai, a remarried couple who return to the city after the end of the Cultural Revolution, bringing their children from previous relationships together. The two not only face various challenges in their careers, but also struggle with family conflicts arising from their children's vastly different personalities.

== Cast ==
=== Main cast ===
Actor	Character	Description
Yan Ni	Liu Biyun	A renowned Peking Opera performer and strict mother who demands excellence from her children. Independent, confident, and perfectionist, she balances her career in traditional arts with the complexities of managing a blended household, embodying the spirit of modern professional women.
Wang Yanzhui	Jiang Tianhuai	Director of a forestry bureau, upright, erudite, and optimistic. Though carrying the reserved demeanor of an intellectual, he is not without humor and romance, and possesses wisdom about life. After studying abroad in his youth and losing his first wife in middle age, he helps Liu Biyun navigate the challenges of blended family life with warmth and care.
Zhang Yijie	Jiang Lin	Jiang Tianhuai's mischievous son from his previous marriage. Known for getting into trouble and fighting, he is the family's greatest source of concern. As the youngest family member, he constantly acts out. Through the caring efforts of Liu Biyun and Jiang Tianhuai, he eventually reforms and learns to live harmoniously with his blended siblings.
Zhai Xiaowen	Li Bing	Liu Biyun's introverted and quiet son from her previous marriage to Li Qingshan. Having spent his early years with an abusive, alcoholic father, Li Bing developed a sensitive and withdrawn personality. After joining his mother's new household with Jiang Tianhuai as stepfather, Li Bing carefully maintains family bonds while yearning for maternal love, gradually revealing his integrity, kindness, and academic excellence. His silence stems from trauma caused by his broken original family. When facing criticism of his mother from others, he chooses his own way to protect Liu Biyun's reputation. When his mother comes looking for him, he shows cautious anticipation, displaying both the stubbornness and maturity typical of adolescent boys.

=== Supporting cast ===
Actor	Character	Description
Li Chunyao	Jiang Mei	Straightforward and passionate, possessing a "big sister" quality in matters of the heart. She develops a crush on her father's chauffeur, Chen Xiangdong, and pursues him aggressively. However, Chen's true affection lies with her younger sister, Jiang Xue. Heartbroken by this revelation, Jiang Mei ultimately decides to marry Huang Haijun, who has always loved her.
Dai Yanni	Ouyang Hong	An ambitious, determined girl with ideals and pursuits. Having studied Peking Opera under renowned masters since childhood, she seeks to advance her career in traditional arts. Following her master's advice, she becomes Liu Biyun's apprentice. Though Liu Biyun initially refuses to take disciples, Ouyang Hong's persistent efforts eventually move her, becoming her first formal student.
Qin Niu Zhengwei	Jiang Xue	Liu Biyun's daughter from her previous marriage to Li Qingshan. In the divorce settlement, Liu Biyun chose to take Jiang Xue while leaving Li Bing with her ex-husband. A love-struck young woman, Jiang Xue privately marries Xie Sibin and becomes pregnant during their time in the countryside. When Sibin leaves for abroad and Jiang Xue returns to the city, they separate. Despite everything, Jiang Xue insists on having the child.
Wang Zirui	Jiang Sen	A typical example of the educated youth after the Cultural Revolution. He accidentally marries a peasant woman while in the countryside and subsequently faces the hardships of being unable to return to the city and failing the college entrance exam. Despite his difficult past, his unexpected marriage leads him to find a suitable life partner. With the support and encouragement of his family, his life gradually improves.
Liu Enshang	Huang Haijun	
Liu Shuo	Chen Xiangdong	Jiang Tianhuai's chauffeur, pursued by Jiang Mei. However, his true affection lies with Jiang Xue, whom he publicly vows to care for throughout his life.

=== Guest appearances ===
Actor	Character
Li Zixuan	
Deng Chaoyuan	

== Soundtrack ==
The original soundtrack was released in August 2021.

Song Title	Lyricist	Composer	Artist	Remarks
Heart Toward Sunshine (心若向陽)	Liu Sijun	Yang Huan	Li Junyi	Opening Theme
Embrace (擁抱)	Jiang Yalei	Liu Sijun	Xiao Fan	Ending Theme
Quietly (靜靜地)	Zang Chuanwei	Liu Sijun	Li Junyi/Zhai Xiaowen	Interlude
Youth Journey (青春旅途)	Jiang Yalei	Liu Sijun	Zhai Xiaowen	Interlude
Best Times (最好的時光)	Jiang Yalei	Liu Sijun	Dai Yanni	Interlude
Wish (心願)	Jiang Yalei	Liu Sijun	Dai Yanni	Interlude

== Production ==
=== Pre-production ===
This drama marks Yan Ni's first attempt at portraying a Peking Opera performer. Her opera costume garnered widespread audience attention upon its release. To deeply interpret the role, Yan Ni extensively researched video materials of renowned Peking Opera artists such as Zhang Huoding, Chi Xiaoquiu, and Cheng Yanqiu, carefully imitating the daily mannerisms of opera performers. She invested all her passion and energy, striving to perfectly embody the character and present audiences with an authentic and moving portrayal of a Peking Opera artist.

=== Screenplay ===
Dear Parents skillfully incorporates classical elements of traditional family dramas. In this work, Liu Biyun appears as a typical "tiger mom," setting strict standards for her children and engaging in stern discipline when they misbehave. Conversely, Jiang Tianhuai takes on the role of the "cat dad," not only attending cram school in place of malingering Jiang Lin, but also bringing warm soup to the ill Li Bing. In his leisure time, he befriends Jiang Lin and Li Bing, taking them fishing at the forestry station. This relaxed and heartwarming narrative design not only feels intimate to audiences but deeply touches viewers' emotions, sparking strong resonance.

=== Filming ===
On July 28, 2020, the period family drama Dear Parents began production in Beijing, starring Yan Ni, Wang Yanzhui, Zhang Yijie, and Zhai Xiaowen. Directors Shi Chengye and Wang Ruixin, along with the main cast and crew, made appearances at the opening ceremony.

On November 14, the drama completed filming. Lead actress Yan Ni, collaborating with Wang Yanzhui for the first time in this production, portrayed a remarried couple navigating four decades of emotional history.

=== Production team ===
- Producers: Gong Yu, Yu Junsheng, Sun Zhonghuai, Zeng Maojun
- Chief Producers: Yin Xianjin, Yang Bei, Fang Fang
- Supervisors: Wang Xiaohui, Han Zhijie, Zhu Liqing
- Cinematography: Sun Peihao
- Music: Liu Sijun
- Editing: Li Haode
- Art Direction: Feng Zhiyuan
- Costume Design: Fu Zhenfang
- Makeup Design: Hou Tao
- Lighting: Sun Hongliang

=== Production companies ===
- Wanda Film & Television Media Co., Ltd
- Huoerguosi New Media Chengpin Culture Media Co., Ltd
- Beijing Chuanna Yinxiang Culture Co., Ltd

=== Co-production ===
- Beijing Radio and Television Station
- Beijing iQIYI Technology Co., Ltd
- Tencent Technology (Beijing) Co., Ltd

=== Behind the scenes ===
On the day Wang Yanzhui's scenes wrapped, it was already past 2 a.m. Every child was reluctant to see him go, so we sat on a sofa together chatting, with each person sharing their innermost feelings.

Yan Ni and Zhai Xiaowen's mother-son bond on screen is profound. In one scene, Liu Biyun prepares a birthday cake for Li Bing. Though moved, Li Bing avoids her gaze, fearing his father's displeasure. After filming, Zhai Xiaowen was so moved he wept, sending Yan Ni a WeChat message of thanks. Yan Ni warmly responded, encouraging him to continue pursuing truth, goodness, and beauty together.

This was Yan Ni's first time portraying a Peking Opera performer. Despite starting from zero, she put in considerable effort, not only consulting with Peking Opera instructors but also maintaining strict standards in her daily life, carefully controlling her speech patterns and physical movements.

Before filming, Yan Ni spent time watching videos of renowned Peking Opera masters and studying related materials. She also specially consulted with actor Wang Xueqi for guidance.

== Broadcast and promotion ==
=== Broadcast information ===
Broadcast platform	Broadcast date
Beijing Satellite Television	August 10, 2021
Tianjin Satellite Television	March 9, 2022
Nanjing Film and Television Channel	April 19, 2022
Wuhan Number Two Channel	June 26, 2022

=== Promotion ===
In August 2021, the drama released a "Family Dinner" poster. On August 9, it released a trailer and announced its premiere date. On August 10, it released opening character posters.

=== Viewership ===
Dear Parents aired for four weeks on Beijing Satellite Television with steadily increasing viewership. In its final week, it averaged a 0.761% rating per episode, ranking 4th among provincial satellite TV prime-time dramas in single-channel viewership, showing a 35.9% increase from its opening week.

== Reception ==
=== Audience ratings ===
Platform	Rating	Number of reviews	As of
Douban	4.9/10	12,820	March 14, 2024
iQIYI	7.1/10	2,438	March 14, 2024

=== Critical reception ===
Jinwan Daily commented that the drama combines narrative with traditional cultural elements, exemplifying creative innovation while encouraging younger audiences to appreciate the importance of cultural preservation. Both the mentor-student relationships between Liu Biyun and Li Qingshan, and between Ouyang Hong and Liu Biyun, convey the transmission of culture and spirit between generations.

Xinhuanet noted that Dear Parents depicts the struggles of previous generations while showcasing their wisdom in handling life and emotional challenges. The drama transcends conventional family drama conventions, exploring the complex relationships, marriage philosophies, and educational values within blended families. The everyday warmth of the Jiang household resonates deeply with many viewers.

=== Awards and honors ===
The drama was nominated for the 2021 Weibo Television Drama Awards in the "Period Drama" category. It was also nominated for the third "Global Rong PING Plan" event featuring works embodying "Era Melody and Family Values."
