= Eternal Faith (TV series) =

Chinese television series

- Genre: Xianxia Romance
- Based on: Heaven Official's Blessing by Mo Xiang Tong Xiu
- Directed by: Ren Haitao
- Starring: Zhai Xiaowen; Zhang Linghe
- Country of origin: China
- Original language: Mandarin

Production
- Producer: Jiang Luyan
- Production location: Xiangshan Global Studios
- Production companies: iQIYI; Croton Media; China Syndication

Related
- Heaven Official's Blessing

Eternal Faith (Chinese: 吉星高照; pinyin: Ji Xing Gao Zhao) is an upcoming Chinese television series adapted from the xianxia novel Heaven Official's Blessing by Mo Xiang Tong Xiu, starring Zhai Xiaowen and Zhang Linghe.

== Premise ==
After his third ascension to the Heavenly Realm, Xie Lian accidentally destroys some gods' properties. In order to pay for the damages, he goes back to the Mortal Realm to gain merits. During his travels, he meets a mysterious young man who goes by the name San Lang.

== Cast ==
=== Main ===
- Zhai Xiaowen as Xie Lian
- Zhang Linghe as Hua Cheng / San Lang

=== Supporting ===
- Cai Yao as Mu Qing
- Xiao Kaizhong as Feng Xin
- Liu Jinyan as Ling Wen
- Zheng Yibin as Nan Feng
- Li Fancheng as Fu Yao
- Liu Shuai as Pei Ming
- Chang Huasen as Shi Qingxuan (Male Wind Master)
- Wang Yueyi as Shi Qingxuan (Female Wind Master)
- Yao Yichen as Jun Wu
- Jin Zehao as Shi Wudu (Water Master)
- Liu Lingzi as Xuan Ji
- Ding Jiawen as Lang Qianqiu
- Gu Yuhan as Ban Yue
- Bian Tianyang as Qi Rong
- Tian Xuning as Ming Yi (Male Earth Master)/ He Xuan
- Sun Jialing as Ming Yi (Female Earth Master)
- Liu Zirui as Quan Yizhen
- Wang Jiayu as Yin Yu
- Zhang Zijian as Pei Su/Xiu
- Ma Li as Jian Lan

== Production ==
=== Development ===
On December 9, 2020, it was announced that Heaven Official's Blessing would be adapted into a television series, co-produced by iQIYI, Croton Media and China Syndication.

=== Filming ===
Principal photography began on July 26, 2021. Filming taking place in Datong, Shanxi wrapped up on August 16. Filming officially wrapped up in Xiangshan, Ningbo on January 15, 2022.
