= Summer in Your Name =

- Traditional Chinese: 以你為名的夏天
- Simplified Chinese: 以你为名的夏天
- Hanyu Pinyin: Yǐ nǐ wéi míng de xiàtiān
- Genre: Coming-of-age; School drama
- Based on: Yi ni wei ming de xiatian (以你為名的夏天) by Ren Pingzhou (任憑舟)
- Directed by: Zhang Boyu
- Starring: Zhai Xiaowen; Wu Shile; Ma Yinyin; Peng Chuyue
- Country of origin: China
- Original language: Mandarin Chinese
- No. of episodes: 24

Production
- Production companies: Youku; Wajijiwa Entertainment (Tianjin) Co., Ltd.

Original release
- Network: Youku

Summer in Your Name (simplified Chinese: 以你为名的夏天; traditional Chinese: 以你為名的夏天; pinyin: Yǐ nǐ wéi míng de xiàtiān) is a 2025 Chinese coming-of-age television drama starring Zhai Xiaowen, Wu Shile, Ma Yinyin and Peng Chuyue. It follows two high school students whose initial misunderstandings gradually give way to a deep and irreplaceable bond. The drama is adapted from a novel of the same name by Chinese writer Ren Pingzhou.

== Synopsis ==
In her final year of high school, Sheng Xia transfers to Nanli High School, where she meets Zhang Shu. Initial misunderstandings lead her to form a poor impression of him, but through daily interactions she gradually finds herself drawn to him. Two seemingly opposite young people slowly become irreplaceable to each other. After supporting one another through their final year of high school, they ultimately pursue their respective dreams side by side.

== Cast ==
=== Main characters ===
Character	Actor	Voice	Description
Zhang Shu	Zhai Xiaowen	Zhai Xiaowen	Male lead. Outgoing and flamboyant, Zhang Shu has pushed himself relentlessly to become a top student, determined not to be a burden to his older sister. Initially seen by Sheng Xia as arrogant and unconventional, he has in fact long been moved by her quiet strength.
Sheng Xia	Wu Shile	Wu Shile	Female lead. A transfer student in her final year of high school, Sheng Xia has always followed the rules — average in grades, introverted in personality, and seemingly fragile, yet possessed of a gentle and resolute inner strength. She gradually finds herself drawn to Zhang Shu's passion and freedom.
Zhang Sujin	Ma Yinyin	Ma Yinyin	
Lu Zheng	Peng Chuyue	Peng Chuyue	

=== Supporting characters ===
Actor	Character	Description
Wang Jiaxuan	Lu Youze	
Lin Xinyi	Xin Xiaohe	
Chen Jiaxin	Chen Mengyao	
Zhang Haolei	Tao Zhizhi	
Geng Yizhan	Hou Junqi	
Kou Weilong	Yang Linyu	
Deng Ying	Wang Lianhua	
Tan Kai	Sheng Mingfeng	

== Production ==
Summer in Your Name was directed by Zhang Boyu and produced by Youku and Wajijiwa Entertainment. It was adapted from a web novel of the same name by Chinese writer Ren Pingzhou. Filming was completed on December 9, 2024, when the cast was officially announced. Summer in Your Name has 24 episodes.

== Promotion and broadcast ==
On December 9, 2024, the series officially announced its cast and released posters and wrap-up photos. In 2025, the drama received its distribution licence, with licence number (Zhe) Web Drama Approval (2025) No. 019.
