= Dream of Golden Years =

- 你好1983
- Genre: Period drama, Inspirational, Time travel, Romantic comedy
- Based on: Rebirth in the 1980s: A Spicy Wife by Bao Zhuangcheng
- Written by: Hou Ying, Liu Lingyan
- Directed by: Zhu Dongning, Huang Chun
- Starring: Zhou Ye, Zhai Xiaowen
- Country of origin: China
- Original language: Mandarin
- No. of episodes: 36

Production
- Executive producers: Jia Zhiqi, Chen Ze
- Producer: Dai Ying
- Running time: Approximately 45 minutes
- Production companies: iQIYI (Qixi Studio), Hainan Huayu Culture Technology Co., Ltd. (Huayu Daye)

Original release
- Network: iQIYI
- Release: 17 March 2026 – present

Dream of Golden Years (Chinese: 你好1983; pinyin: Nǐ Hǎo 1983) is a 2026 Chinese period inspirational television drama. Produced by iQIYI, it is directed by Zhu Dongning and Huang Chun, and Zhou Ye and Zhai Xiaowen in the leading roles. The series is adapted from the Web novel Rebirth in the 1980s: A Spicy Wife by Bao Zhuangcheng, and premiered exclusively on iQIYI on March 17, 2026.

== Plot ==
Xia Xiaolan (played by Zhou Ye), a modern real estate executive, falls into despair after a major upheaval in her company and is unexpectedly transported back to 1983, where she is reborn as an eighteen-year-old girl from a poor rural family. After her rebirth, Xia is no longer willing to submit to fate. Believing firmly that education can change one's destiny, she overcomes numerous hardships in pursuit of academic opportunities and eventually gains admission to her dream university.

Outside of academics, Xia embarks on an entrepreneurial journey. She begins by selling duck eggs and fried pancakes, later expands into clothing resale with her keen business instincts, and eventually enters the real estate industry, where she rapidly accumulates wealth. Along the way, she meets Zhou Cheng (played by Zhai Xiaowen), a gifted young man from a legal family, and the two develop a romance built on mutual support and growth. Through Xia Xiaolan's rise from adversity, the series portrays the determination of a generation of young people striving to transform their destinies amid the tide of China's reform and opening-up era.

== Cast ==
=== Main cast ===
Actor	Character	Description
Zhou Ye	Xia Xiaolan	Originally a 36-year-old modern real estate executive, she is reborn in 1983 as an 18-year-old rural girl. With advanced business insight and perseverance, she rises from a street vendor to a successful figure in the real estate sector. Believing that knowledge can change one's fate, she overcomes numerous obstacles to enter a prestigious university and achieve both academic and professional success. Supported by love and friendship, she transforms from a girl trapped in adversity into a socially responsible entrepreneur of a new era.
Zhai Xiaowen	Zhou Cheng	Born into a prominent family in Beijing, Zhou Cheng is a legal prodigy who graduates from Huaqing University at the age of 20. Upright, gentle, and responsible, he possesses strong business acumen but chooses to dedicate himself to the development of economic and trade law. As Xia Xiaolan's emotional anchor and steadfast partner, he rejects a life of comfort and grows alongside her during the era of reform, embodying both idealism and a sense of social responsibility.

=== Supporting cast ===
Actor	Character	Description
Dong Xuan	Liu Fen	Xia Xiaolan's mother, a traditional rural woman from the 1980s. Initially timid and trapped in an unhappy marriage, she awakens to resist her fate under her daughter's encouragement. She gradually learns to navigate the business world and successfully runs a clothing store, becoming both her daughter's strongest supporter and an independent, confident woman of a new era.
Zhao Da	Liu Yong	Xia Xiaolan's maternal uncle and Liu Fen's elder brother.
Tu Ling	Li Fengmei	Xia Xiaolan's aunt by marriage.
Wang Guanyi	Du Zhaohui	Xia Xiaolan's business partner. The eldest son of Hong Kong's Zhengrong Group, he appears frivolous on the surface but is in fact sharp, decisive, and highly perceptive in business. Amid complicated family struggles, he adopts a playboy persona for self-protection, but after meeting Xia Xiaolan, he becomes one of her most important supporters and benefactors.
Jiang Yi	Chen Xiliang	A core member of Xia Xiaolan's entrepreneurial team. Energetic and innovative, he has a keen sense of the market and fights alongside other young people in the wave of economic reform.
Zheng Wei	Kang Wei	Zhou Cheng's close friend.
Lin Xiao	Bai Zhenzhu	Kang Wei's business partner.
Fan Linfeng	Pan San	
Chen Qitai	Master Qiu	
Chan Sau Chu	Madam Du	Du Zhaohui's mother.
Kuei Ya-lei	Grandma Yu	Xia Xiaolan's landlady.
Zhang Duo	Tang Hong'en	A man who is fond of Liu Fen and the former husband of Ji Ya.
Lan Xi	Ji Ya	Tang Hong'en's former wife.
Jiang Zixin	Xia Ziyu	Xia Xiaolan's cousin.

=== Soundtrack ===
Dream of Golden Years Original Soundtrack
No.	Title	Lyrics	Music	Performer	Length
1.	"Gong Xi Gong Xi" (Promotional song)			Zhou Ye, Zhai Xiaowen
2.	"Blazing Daydream" (Insert song, ending theme)	Lai Weifeng	Lai Weifeng	Liu Lian
3.	"Calling" (Insert song, ending theme)	Hou Ying	Sheng Ziyang	Zhang Liyin
4.	"As Long as I See You" (Insert song)	Hou Ying, Ding Jiayu	Ding Jiayu	Zhai Xiaowen
5.	"Bloom (For My Love)" (Insert song)	Zhang Yuyan	Lin Yu	Galaxy Express
6.	"Before the Finish Line" (Insert song, ending theme)	Xia Fei	Gao Xuelun	Midsummer Night Group

== Production ==
Dream of Golden Years was jointly produced by iQIYI and Huayu Daye. After being officially registered with the National Radio and Television Administration in April 2024, the drama attracted media attention due to its adaptation from the popular online novel Rebirth in the 1980s: A Spicy Wife.

Filming officially began in November 2024. During production, the series emphasized recreating the authentic atmosphere of the 1980s, with careful attention given to set construction and costume design based on the historical and social context of the period. On August 22, 2025, the drama received its official distribution license, sparking industry discussion about the growing popularity of female inspirational period dramas. It was ultimately scheduled to premiere on iQIYI on March 17, 2026.
