= Falling into Your Smile =

Chinese television series

- Official poster
- 你微笑时很美
- Genre: E-sports; Rom-com; Youth
- Based on: "You're Beautiful When You Smile" by Qing Mei
- Written by: Jia Chang
- Directed by: Qiu Zhongwei
- Starring: Xu Kai; Cheng Xiao; Zhai Xiaowen; Yao Chi; Zhou Yiran; Wang Ruoshan; Merxat Yalkun; Ling Chao; Gao Han; Xiao Kaizhong; Wang Yijun; Qi Yandi; Sun Kai; Cui Shaoyang
- Ending theme: "Soulmate" by Xu Kai and Cheng Xiao
- Country of origin: China
- Original language: Mandarin
- No. of seasons: 1
- No. of episodes: 31

Production
- Producers: Yang Xia; Li Zhanying
- Production locations: Shenzhen, China
- Running time: 45 minutes
- Production company: Xinpai Media

Original release
- Network: Tencent; Youku
- Release: June 23 – July 15, 2021

Falling Into Your Smile (Chinese: 你微笑时很美; pinyin: Nǐ wéixiào shí hěn měi) is a 2021 Chinese television series adopted from a novel of the same title by Qing Mei. Starring Xu Kai and Cheng Xiao, the series depicts the lives of professional esports players. It premiered in Tencent Video on 23 June 2021 and concluded on 15 July 2021. The series filmed mainly in Shenzhen, China, beginning on December 21, 2019 and finishing May 3rd of the following year.

== Synopsis ==
Falling Into Your smile centers on Tong Yao (Cheng Xiao), a young woman who joins the esports team "ZGDX" after graduating from college. She becomes the first official female esports player in the Chinese division of the professional league. Faced with doubts and various inconveniences as a result of her gender, she overcomes these difficulties with the support of her teammates.

== Cast ==
=== Leads ===
- Cheng Xiao as Tong Yao "Smiling"

Tong Yao is the mid-laner of ZGDX. She is the first female player in the fictionalized Onmyoji Arena Professional League, a professional esports league.

- Xu Kai as Lu Sicheng "Chessman"

Lu Sicheng is the team captain and AD of ZGDX. He is the son of the owners of the wealthy Lu Group. He appears cold and aloof, but he is a supportive and caring team player. As a result of his remarkable ability, fans gave him the nickname "God of E-sports".

=== Supporting Cast ===
==== ZGDX team ====
- Yao Chi as Lu Yue "Lü"

Substitute mid-laner of ZGDX and Lu Sicheng's younger brother who usually reports everything Sicheng does to their mother, including his relationship with Tong Yao.

- Merxat Yalkun as Yu Ming "Ming"

Current coach of ZGDX. He retired from being a mid-laner due to his hand injury.

- Xiao Kaizhong as Lao Mao "Cat"

Top-laner of ZGDX who loves fitness and sports.

- Gao Han as Lao K "K"

Member of ZGDX who looks cold outside, but actually a middle-aged boy who knows a lot about beauty.

- Sun Kai as Xiao Pang "Pang"

Member of ZGDX who is very foodie and is the first person to discover Lu Sicheng and Tong Yao's relationship.

- Cui Shaoyang as Xiao Rui, manager of ZGDX

==== YQCB team ====
- Liu Jinyu as Ying Rong "Rong", the Top laner
- Xiong Aobo as Kim Eun-suk "X BANG", youngest member who came from South Korea
- Zhou Yiran as Ai Jia "Aico", the Mid laner and Jinyang's boyfriend
- Wang Ruoshan as Chen Jinyang, the eventual team owner and Tong Yao's best friend from a wealthy family
- Wang Yijun as Lee Jun-hyuk "Hierophant"

Member of YQCB who comes from South Korea and, like Lu Sicheng is a former member of TAT. The pair were close friends when they were teammates.

- Gouchen Haoyu as Liang Sheng "Student"

Team captain of YQCB, a kind and easy-going person.

==== CK team ====
- Li Kun as Haoyun Lai "Luck", the Top laner
- Zhai Xiaowen as Jian Yang "Sunflower"

Team captain of CK and Tong Yao's ex-boyfriend who insist to get back together. He is envious with Tong Yao and Sicheng's relationship but sincerely wished the best for them later

- Chen Jianyu as Xiao Hua "Floret", the Mid laner
- Yan Haoyuan as Hu Die "Butterfly"

Member of CK with an aggressive play style.

- Wang Zihao as Lao Wang "Wang"

==== Others ====
- Ling Chao as Lee Hang Suk "Kun"

He is a Professional E-sports Player from the E-sports Team FNC, Captain and Jungler. He is known to change girlfriends like how he changes clothes. He immediately forms a crush on Smiling (Tong Yao) whom he calls Pretty Girl and tries to convince Lu Si-Cheng to let him date her.

- He Peng as A Tai

Mid laner of TAT, former teammate of Lu Sicheng and Li Junhyuk.

- Yang Mingna as Tong Yao's mother
- Hou Zhangrong as Tong Yao's father who always supports her dream
- Che Yongli as Wang Lan

Executive director of Lu Group and mother to Lu Sicheng and Lu Yue.

- Qi Yandi as Su Luo, one of Sicheng's blind date who has one-sided feelings for him.
- Chen Nuo as Ning Jiaqi, Xu Tailun's girlfriend who had fight with Tong Yao.
- Wu Qianying as Guo Guo, Xu Tailun's fan and later cheating girlfriend who wants to dominate and own him but leave him for a reason.
- Wang Min as Ai Jia's mother and Tong Yao's teacher who never agreed with his dream of becoming an e-sports player.
- Gao Weiman as Lu Lu, Ning Jiaqi's friend
- Liuhao Junlong as Tony, ZGDX's MUA
- Zheng Yang as Lin Mo, a young girl with mental disorder who sent a razor through delivery to Tong Yao, causing her to be unable to compete.
- Kai Wang as an Extra

== Soundtrack ==
No.	Title	Singer	Length
1.	"Running to You (逆着人群奔向你)" (Promotional song)	Angela Zhang
2.	"Facade (被人)" (Emotional theme song)	Joker Xue
3.	"Soulmate (第一默契)" (Ending theme song)	Xu Kai and Cheng Xiao
4.	"Follow the Light (追随光)" (Theme song)	Chen Zuoxuan
5.	"Signs of You (漾)" (CK team song)	Zhai Xiaowen and Wang Tianfang
6.	"Heroes" (ZGDX team song)	Air League Band
7.	"Warrior (逆燃)" (YQCB team song)	Seventeen (Joshua, Jun, The8, Mingyu, Vernon)
8.	"Everytime" (FNC team song)	WayV
9.	"Edge (锋芒)" (OPL competition song)	Wang Ju
10.	"Before Dawn (明亮)" (Promotional song)	Gao Han
11.	"Soulmate Solo Ver"	Lara Liang
