= R1SE =

Chinese boy group

- Origin: Beijing, China
- Genres: C-pop; Mandopop
- Years active: 2019–2021
- Label: Wajijiwa Entertainment
- Past members: Zhou Zhennan; He Luoluo; Yan Xujia; Xia Zhiguang; Yao Chen; Zhai Xiaowen; Zhang Yanqi; Liu Ye; Ren Hao; Zhao Lei; Zhao Rang

R1SE was a Chinese idol boy band, formed by Tencent through the 2019 reality show Produce Camp 2019 on Tencent Video. The group consisted of 11 members: Zhou Zhennan, He Luoluo, Yan Xujia, Xia Zhiguang, Yao Chen, Zhai Xiaowen, Zhang Yanqi, Liu Ye, Ren Hao, Zhao Lei, Zhao Rang.

They made their debut on 8 June 2019 with the debut song "R.1.S.E". R1SE is a time-limited boy group. The group officially disbanded on June 14, 2021, after two years of active promotion.

== Name ==
The band name, "R1SE" is the acronym for "Running", "Number 1", "Sun" and "Energy". The name also represents the will to improve and continue rising to become China's number one boy band. Their name can be pronounced either as "R. One. S. E." (English: /ɑr, wʌn,ɛs,i/) or simply "RISE" (English: /ɹaɪz/).

== History ==
R1SE was formed through the reality television show Produce Camp 2019 aired from April 6 to 8 June 2019. It was the second season of Produce 101 China. On the live broadcast of the finals, it was announced that Zhou Zhennan placed first, followed by He Luoluo, Yan Xujia, Xia Zhiguang, Yao Chen, Zhai Xiaowen, Zhang Yanqi, Liu Ye, Ren Hao, Zhao Lei and Zhao Rang respectively. The center and leader position was given to the first-place winner, Zhou Zhennan.

Most members are from different groups and companies before the show, from 8 June 2019 to 8 June 2021, all management rights are in the hand of Wajijiwa Entertainment.

== Members ==
- Zhou Zhennan / Vin Zhou (周震南)
- He Luoluo / Stark He (何洛洛)
- Yan Xujia / Davis Yan (焉栩嘉)
- Xia Zhiguang / X-Light Xia (夏之光)
- Yao Chen / Ivan Yao (姚琛)
- Zhai Xiaowen / Bill Zhai (翟潇闻)
- Zhang Yanqi / YoRoll Zhang (张颜齐)
- Liu Ye / Yea Liu (刘也)
- Ren Hao / P.O.I Ren (任豪)
- Zhao Lei / Ray Zhao (赵磊)
- Zhao Rang / Ryan Zhao (赵让)

== Discography ==
=== Extended plays ===
Title	Album details	Sales
Going To Powerfully Burst (就要掷地有声的炸裂)	Released: August 6, 2019; Label: Wajijiwa Entertainment, Tencent; Formats: Digital download, streaming; Track listing: 1. 喊出我的名字 (Call Me Call My Name); 2. R.1.S.E; 3. 誰都別吝嗇 (None Should be Stingy); 4. WORLD WORLD WORLD; 5. 十二 (Twelve); 6. 就要擲地有聲的炸裂 (Going To Powerfully Burst); 7. HAVE FUN	CHN: 3,078,458
Boom! Rhapsody! (炸裂狂想曲)	Released: December 1, 2019; Label: Wajijiwa Entertainment, Tencent; Formats: Digital download, streaming; Track listing: 1. 角儿无大小 (No Small Roles); 2. 瘋子 (Madmen); 3. Never Surrender; 4. 星星泡飯 (Stars Soaked in Rice); 5. 聲聲不息 (Endless Voices); 6. 赤腳追光 (Chasing Light)	—N/a
Sunr1se (曜为名)	Released: June 12, 2020; Label: Wajijiwa Entertainment, Tencent; Formats: Digital download, streaming; Track listing: 1. 曜 (SUNR1SE); 2. 妈妈叫你别哭了 (Mama Told You to Stop Crying); 3. 粉色闪电 (The Pink Second); 4. 24HOURS; 5. HAPPY BIRTHDAY TO ME; 6. 破曉星 (Twinkling at Dawn)	CHN: 550,496
Before Sunrise (我们破晓星辰)	Released: April 29, 2021; Label: Wajijiwa Entertainment, Tencent; Formats: Digital download, streaming; Track listing: 1. Zoom; 2. 彼方世界 (Beyond The World); 3. Find Me; 4. 干饭歌 (R1SE, Rice); 5. Goodbye, my old friend 6. 我要創造一個有你的世界 (Gonna create a world of you); 7. Last Moment	—N/a

=== Songs ===
Title	Year	Peak chart positions	Album	Notes
Title	Year	CHN	Album	Notes
"喊出我的名字" (Call Me Call My Name)	2019	—	Going To Powerfully Burst	Theme song of Produce Camp 2019
"R.1.S.E"	2019	16	Going To Powerfully Burst	Promotion song of Men in Black: International
"无愧" (Innocent)	2019	21	Non-album singles	Shanghai Fortress OST
"荣耀的战场" (Glory Battlefield)	2019	30	Non-album singles	The King's Avatar OST
"少年如故" (Like Youth)	2019	—	Non-album singles	—N/a
谁都別吝嗇 (None Should be Stingy)	2019	—	Going To Powerfully Burst	—N/a
"World World World"	2019	—	Going To Powerfully Burst	—N/a
"十二" (Twelve)	2019	—	Going To Powerfully Burst	—N/a
"就要掷地有声的炸裂" (Going To Powerfully Burst)	2019	—	Going To Powerfully Burst	—N/a
"Have Fun"	2019	—	Boom! Rhapsody!	—N/a
"角儿无大小" (No Small Roles)	2019	—	Boom! Rhapsody!	—N/a
"疯子" (Madmen)	2019		Boom! Rhapsody!	—N/a
"Never Surrender"	2019	—	Boom! Rhapsody!	—N/a
"星星泡饭" (Stars Soaked in Rice)	2019		Boom! Rhapsody!	—N/a
"声声不息" (Endless Voices)	2019	—	Boom! Rhapsody!	—N/a
"奇迹无限" (Infinite Miracle)	2019	—	Non-album single	Boonie Bears: The Wild Life OST
"赤脚追光" (Chasing Light)	2020	—	Boom! Rhapsody!	—N/a
"曜" (Sunr1se)	2020	—	Sunr1se	—N/a
"妈妈叫你别哭了" (Mama Told You to Stop Crying)	2020	12	Sunr1se	—N/a
"粉色闪电" (The Pink Second)	2020	—	Sunr1se	—N/a
"24Hours"	2020	—	Sunr1se	—N/a
"Happy Birthday to Me"	2020	32	Sunr1se	—N/a
"破晓星" (Twinkling at Dawn)	2020	16	Sunr1se	—N/a
"Zoom"	2021	—	Before Sunrise	—N/a
彼方世界 (Beyond The World)	2021	—	Before Sunrise	—N/a
"Find Me"	2021	—	Before Sunrise	—N/a
"干饭歌" (R1SE, Rice)	2021	—	Before Sunrise	—N/a
"Goodbye, My Old Friend"	2021	—	Before Sunrise	—N/a
"Gonna Create a World of You"	2021	—	Before Sunrise	—N/a
"Last Moment"	2021	—	Before Sunrise	—N/a

== Tours ==
- WE ARE R.1.S.E — 2019 R1SE National Tour Concert (Guangzhou & Chongqing)Remark: Concert in Shanghai, originally scheduled for 8 Feb, was cancelled due to COVID-19.
- SUNR1SE premiere (曜为名首唱会) (23 September 2020) Remark: online
- 我们 破晓星辰 告别限定演唱会 (R1SE Farewell concert limited) (2-3 May 2021) (Shanghai)
- 我们 破晓星辰 告别限定演唱会 - 最终场暨告别典礼 (R1SE Farewell concert limited — Final Farewell) (13 June 2021) (Beijing) Remark: online and offline

== Variety Shows ==
=== Variety shows ===
- Super R1SE (Super R1SE·蓄能季) (11 August 2019 – 10 November 2019) released on Tencent Video
- Autumn with 11 youths (十一少年的秋天) (1 December 2019 – 5 January 2020) released on Tencent Video
- Super R1SE season 2 (Super R1SE·周年季) (5 July 2020 – 29 August 2020) released on Tencent Video
- Before sunrise (我们 破晓之前) (29 April 2021 – 21 May 2021) released on Tencent Video

== Accolades ==
=== 2019 ===
- GQ Men of the Year 2019 — Group of the Year
- Asia Songboard — Most popular new group
- COSMO Glam Night — Group of the Year
- TMEA Tencent Music Awards — Best Group Album of the Year
- Tencent All Star Awards 2019 — Group of the Year (Male)

=== 2020 ===
- Tencent Entertainment White Paper Awards — Group of the Year
- Weibo Night Awards — Best Group of the Year
- 2020 MTV Europe Music Award for Best Greater China Act
- Beijing Music Exposition (BME) — Best Group of the Year
- ELLEMEN Film Hero 2020 — Group of the Year
- Tencent All Star Awards 2020 — Best Album "曜为名" (SUNR1SE)
- Asian pop music awards 2020 — Best Chinese Group of the Year
- Asian pop music awards 2020 — Most Popular Boy Group
- CCTV's/Yang Video — Most Popular Newcomer of the year
- 28th STYLE GALA 精品风格云盛典 — Annual Popular Team
