= Chinese Restaurant (TV series) =

- Simplified Chinese: 中餐厅
- Traditional Chinese: 中餐廳
- Hanyu Pinyin: Zhōngcāntīng
- Genre: Cooking show Reality show
- Starring: See below
- Country of origin: China
- Original language: Chinese
- No. of seasons: 10
- No. of episodes: 120

Production
- Production locations: Season 1: Ko Chang, Thailand; Season 2: Colmar, France; Season 3: Taormina, Italy; Season 4: Yangtze River Basin, China; Season 5: China; Season 6: Chenzhou, Hunan, China; Season 7: Budapest, Hungary; Season 8: Giverny, France; Season 9: Tangier, Morocco; Season 10: Chiang Mai, Thailand
- Camera setup: Multicamera setup
- Running time: 90 minutes
- Production company: Hunan Broadcasting System

Original release
- Network: Hunan Television
- Release: 22 July 2017 – 4 September 2026

Chinese Restaurant (simplified Chinese: 中餐厅; traditional Chinese: 中餐廳; pinyin: Zhōngcāntīng) is a Chinese celebrity reality show broadcast by Hunan Television. The show features five celebrities as they run a Chinese restaurant abroad in 20 days with the aim to promote Chinese Food culture. It's Vicky Zhao's first reality show as a regular guest.

The first season was taped in Thailand, and it was premiered on 22 July 2017 with 11 episodes. The second season was taped in France, and it was premiered on 20 July 2018 with 12 episodes. The third season was taped in Italy, and it was premiered on 26 July 2019 with 13 episodes. The fourth season was taped in China due to the ongoing COVID-19 pandemic, and it was premiered on 31 July 2020 with 12 episodes. The fifth season was taped in China again, and it was premiered on 30 July 2021 with 12 episodes. The sixth season was taped in China the third time, and it was premiered on 12 August 2022 with 12 episodes. The seventh season was taped in Hungary, and it was premiered on 21 July 2023 with 12 episodes. The eighth season was taped in France again, and it was premiered on 19 July 2024 with 12 episodes. The ninth season was taped in Morocco, and it premiered on 20 June 2025 with 12 episodes. The tenth season was taped in Thailand again, and it was premiered on 19 June 2026 with 12 episodes.

== Cast ==
=== Season 1 ===
- Vicky Zhao
- Huang Xiaoming
- Zhou Dongyu
- Sean Zhang
- Enti Jin

=== Season 2 ===
- Vicky Zhao
- Shu Qi
- Alec Su
- Karry Wang
- Pax Congo

=== Season 3 ===
Regular

- Huang Xiaoming
- Qin Hailu
- Karry Wang (left in Episode 8 due to school work)
- Yang Zi
- Jack Lin

Recurring

- Tong Zhuo (start from Episode 3)

=== Season 4 ===
- Huang Xiaoming
- Zanilia Zhao
- Sean Zhang
- Jack Lin
- Ariel Li

=== Season 5 ===
Regular

- Huang Xiaoming
- Ning Jing
- Zhou Ye
- Tenzin Tsundue
- Annabel Yao

Recurring

- Gong Jun (Changsha)
- Tan Jianci (Guilin)

=== Season 6 ===
- Huang Xiaoming
- Yin Tao
- Yin Zheng
- Chen Linong
- Zhang Ruonan

=== Season 7 ===
- Huang Xiaoming
- Mark Chao
- Yue Yunpeng
- Yin Zheng
- Shen Mengchen
- Greg Hsu
- Jelly Lin
- Cheng Xiao

=== Season 8 ===
- Huang Xiaoming
- Yin Zheng
- Esther Yu
- Jiang Yan
- Jack Lin
- Hu Yitian
- Corentin Delcroix
- Bill Zhai

=== Season 9 ===
- Huang Xiaoming
- Jiang Yan
- Ryan Ding
- Shen Yue
- Bill Zhai
- Patrick Finkler
- Jack Lin

=== Season 10 ===
- Huang Xiaoming
- Karry Wang
- Hannah Quinlivan
- Jiang Yan
- Enti Jin
- Zhang Yaqi
- Jack Lin

== List of guests ==
=== Season 1 ===
- Cui Xinqin (Episode 4)
- Mike D. Angelo (Episode 5)
- Hongyok Chansakorn (Episode 5)
- Boat Sirirod (Episode 5)

=== Season 2 ===
- Zhang Tielin (Episode 4 – 5)
- Bao Bei'er (Episode 8 – 9)
- Yang Zishan (Episode 8 – 9)
- Huang Xiaoming (Episode 9 – 10)

=== Season 3 ===
- Neil Gao (Episode 3 – 5)
- Shen Mengchen (Episode 6 – 7)
- Du Haitao (Episode 6 – 7)
- Dylan Wang (Episode 9 – 11)
- Alec Su (Episode 11 – 13)

=== Season 4 ===
- Nemo Feng (Episode 4 – 6, 9 – 12)
- Casper Chu (Episode 4 – 6, 9 – 12)
- Liu Yuning (Episode 6 – 12)
- Yang Chaoyue (Episode 8 – 12)
- Du Haitao (Episode 9 – 12)
- Karry Wang (Episode 9 – 12)
- Li Zifeng (Episode 9 – 12)
- Cai Cheng (Episode 9 – 12)
- Joy Wang (Episode 9 – 12)

=== Season 6 ===
- Will Liu (Episode 4 – 6)
- Vivi Wang (Episode 4 – 6)
- Huang Xiaolei (Episode 6 – 7)
- Hu Lianxin (Episode 6 – 7)
- Wu Xingjian (Episode 6 – 7)
- Na Ying (Episode 9 – 10)
- Cai Guoqing (Episode 11)
- Wowkie Zhang (Episode 11)

=== Season 7 ===
- Lai Yumeng (Episode 6)
- Ge Jiabi (Episode 7 – 8)
- Alyssa Chia (Episode 8 – 9)

=== Season 8 ===
- Deng Yaping (Episode 2 – 3)
- Su Bingtian (Episode 2 – 4)
- Fang Jinlong (Episode 6 – 8)
- Julien Gaudfroy (Episode 7 – 8)
- Peng Jingxuan (Episode 8 – 9)
- Yan Xi (Episode 8 – 9)
- Huang Yi (Episode 9 – 11)
- Lu Chen (Episode 9 – 11)
- Joyce Jonathan (Episode 12)

=== Season 9 ===
- Yue Yunpeng (Episode 3 – 5)
- Dina Ottmani (Episode 6 – 9)
- Cai Guoqing (Episode 10 – 12)
- Zhang Baiqiao (Episode 10 – 12)

=== Season 10 ===
- Joie Qu (Episode 1, 3 – 4)
- Deon Dai (Episode 3 – 4)
- Yuan Yiqi (Episode 3 – 6)
- Patrick Finkler (Episode 6 – 8)
- Liang Feng (Episode 7)
- Hai Qing (Episode 8 – 9)
- Cecilia Yip (Episode 11)

== Theme Song ==
- "Chinese Restaurant" (Season 1 – 3)
  - Composer: Tu Yi
  - Lyricist:
    - Meng Xiao (Season 1 & 2)
    - Meng Xiao and Ye Feng (Season 3)
  - Performer:
    - Vicky Zhao and Huang Xiaoming (Season 1)
    - Zhou Dongyu (Special Edition of Season 1)
    - Vicky Zhao and Alec Su (Season 2)
    - Huang Xiaoming, Qin Hailu, Yang Zi and Karry Wang (Season 3)
- "Chinese Flavor" (Season 4)
  - Composer: Casper Chu, Gen Neo
  - Lyricist: Casper Chu, Zhang Jinghao
  - Performer:
    - Huang Xiaoming, Zanilia Zhao, Sean Zhang, Jack Lin, Ariel Li, Liu Yuning and Casper Chu
    - Liu Yuning and Casper Chu
    - Casper Chu
- "The Flavor of China" (Season 5)
  - Composer: Mo Yanlin
  - Lyricist: Xia Nuo
  - Performer: Huang Xiaoming and Ning Jing

== International broadcast ==
Country/Region	Network	Release	Notes
Singapore	E City	1 November 2017	Season 1
Singapore	E City	9 January 2019	Season 2
Singapore	E City	26 November 2019	Season 3
Singapore	E City	18 September 2020	Season 4
Singapore	E City	10 September 2021	Season 5
Singapore	E City	16 September 2022	Season 6
Singapore	E City	25 August 2023	Season 7
Singapore	E City	2 October 2024	Season 8
Singapore	E City	12 August 2025	Season 9
Hong Kong	TVB Asian Variety	13 January 2018	Season 1
Hong Kong	TVB J2	28 October 2018	Season 2 (Cantonese & Mandarin)
Malaysia	Astro Quan Jia HD	16 February 2018	Season 1
Malaysia	Astro Quan Jia HD	20 July 2018	Season 2 (concurrent)
United States	Sky Link TV	25 July 2018	Season 2
Taiwan	CTi Variety	5 August 2018	Season 1
Taiwan	CTV Main Channel	9 December 2018	Season 1
Taiwan	CTi Variety	6 January 2019	Season 2
Taiwan	CTV Main Channel	25 August 2019	Season 2
Taiwan	CTi Variety	6 September 2020	Season 3
Taiwan	CTV Main Channel	6 September 2020	Season 3
Taiwan	CTi Variety	21 April 2024	Season 7

== Reception ==
=== Awards and nominations ===
Award	Category	Nominee	Result
26th Magnolia Awards	Best Variety Program	Chinese Restaurant 3	Nominated

=== Influences ===
After premiering of the first season on 22 July 2017, the canned bacon labeled "SPAM" was sold out in Chinese online shopping in several hours, which Vicky Zhao bought in a Thailand supermarket and cooking in the show. After premiering of the second season on 20 July 2018, the white stork toy was sold out in Chinese online shopping in several days, which repeated Vicky Zhao's words in the show.

== Controversy ==
Chinese Restaurant has been accused of plagiarism in regards to its format being very similar to South Korean reality show tvN's Youn's Kitchen. Both shows are food-themed and work with the concept of overseas restaurants. Na Young-seok, producer of Youn's Kitchen responded to the claim, stating that "The [Youn's Kitchen] format is not expensive to purchase. If they purchase the format, I can help them on specific details as well."
