= Wei Wei =

Wei Wei may refer to:

- Wei Wei (male writer) (1920–2008), Chinese writer
- Wei Wei (actress) (1922–2023), Chinese actress
- Wei Wei (singer) (born 1963), Chinese singer
- Wei Wei (actor) (born 1969), Chinese actor
- Wei Wei (female writer) (born 1970), Chinese writer
- Wei Wei (comedian) (born 1982), Chinese comedian and one of the Back Dorm Boys
- Wei Wei (basketball) (born 1989), Chinese basketball player
- Wei Wei (murderer) (1979–2019), Chinese murderer executed in Japan

== See also ==
- Wei Wu Wei (1895–1986), British Taoist philosopher and writer
- Ai Weiwei (born 1957), Chinese artist
