= Chi Forest =

Chinese beverage company

Chi Forest (Beijing) Food Technology Group Co., Ltd.
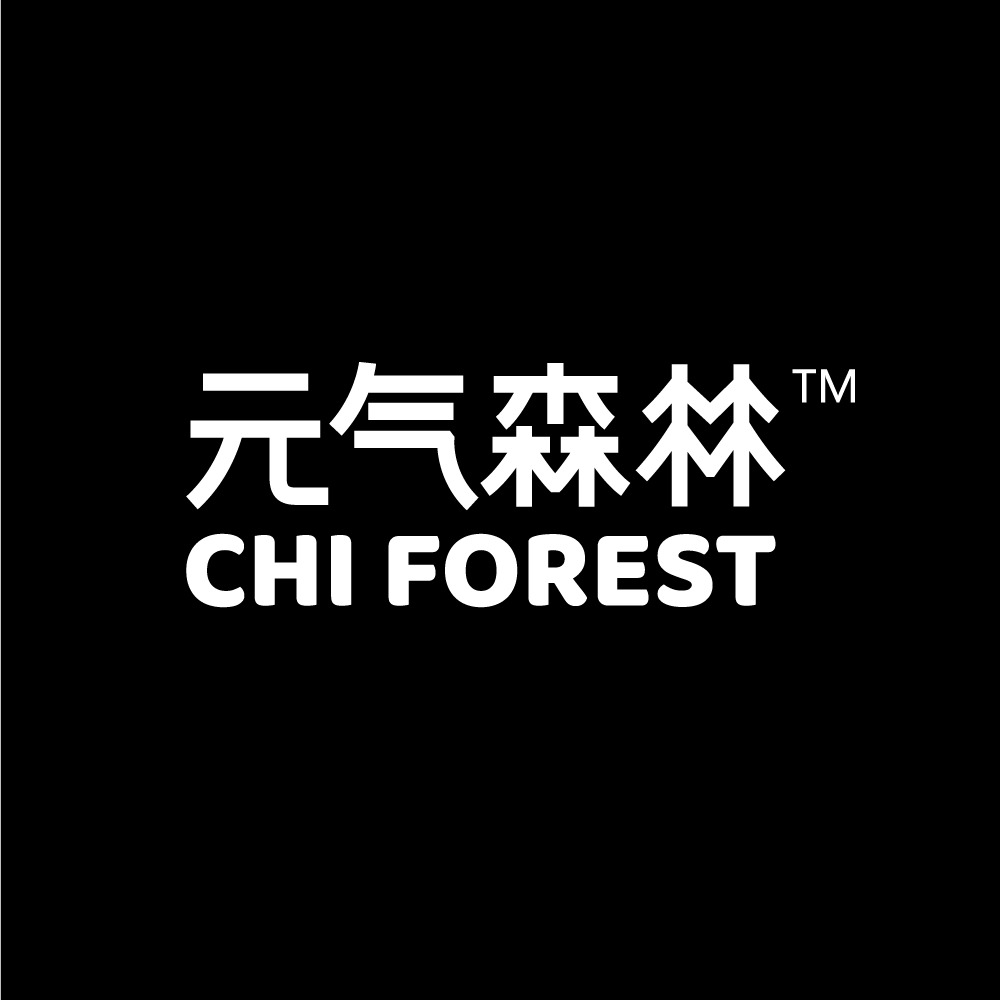
- Trade name: Chi Forest
- Native name: 元气森林（北京）食品科技集团有限公司
- Formerly: Genki Forest
- Type: Private
- Industry: Beverage
- Founded: 2016; 10 years ago
- Founder: Tang Binsen
- Headquarters: Beijing, China
- Website: www.yuanqisenlin.com

Chi Forest (Beijing) Food Technology Group Co., Ltd. (Chinese: 元气森林; pinyin: Yuánqì Sēnlín) is a Chinese beverage company that focuses on low-calorie sparkling drinks and flavored teas.

== History ==
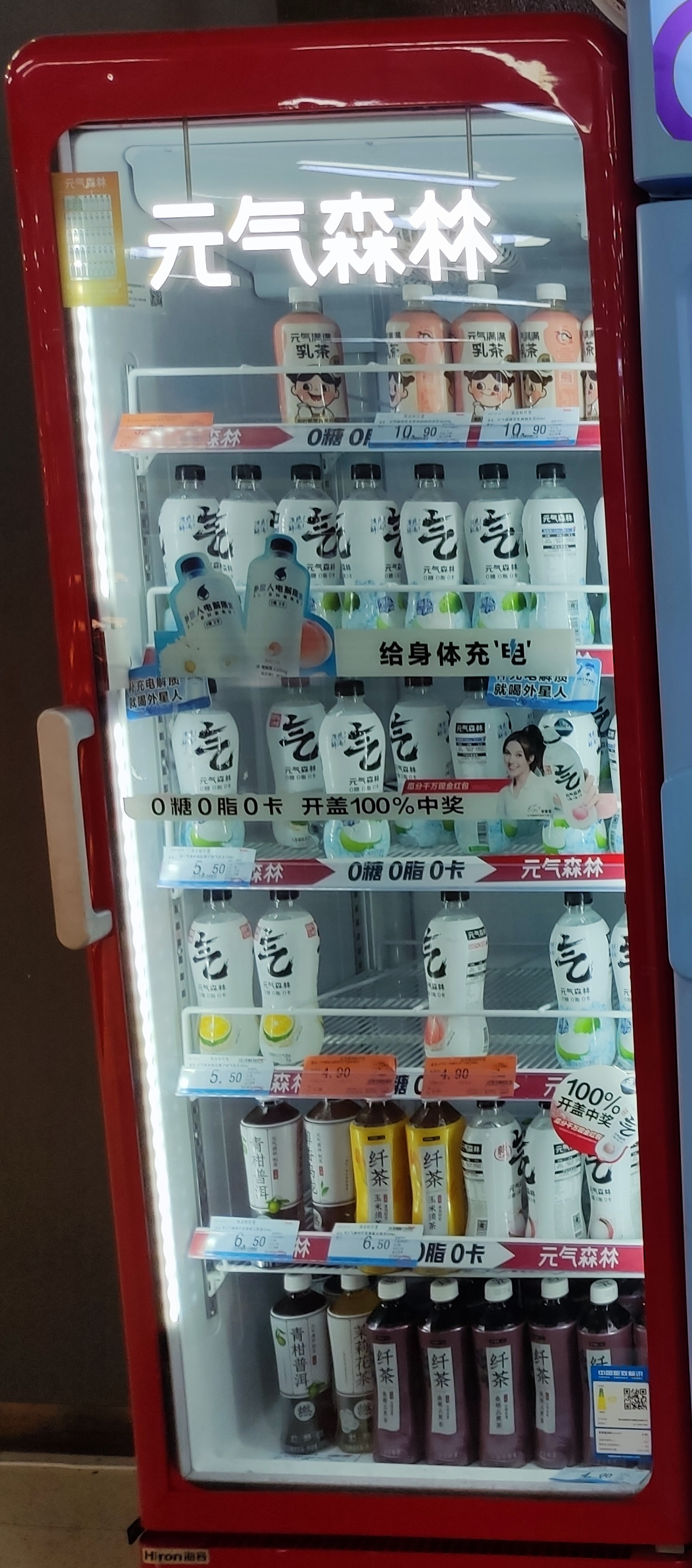
Refrigerator containing Chi Forest products

The company was founded in 2016 as Genki Forest by Tang Binsen. Tang had earlier founded Beijing ELEX Technology, the video game developer behind Clash of Kings, and was its chief executive from 2008 to 2020. According to a 2022 case study by the Cheung Kong Graduate School of Business, Tang left gaming because Tencent and NetEase dominated the industry, and he chose beverages as a sector where he saw room to apply technology. After the sale, Tang set up an investment firm, Challenjers Capital.

Genki Forest eventually managed to generate enough funds through crowdfunding on Weibo to launch Burning Tea, a low-calorie, low-sugar Oolong tea.

After the success of Burning Tea, in 2018 Genki Forest entered the carbonated beverage market which was an immediate success.

Genki Forest differed from its peers as it started out online and then entered traditional sales channels. A self-described technology company, it takes a data-driven and high-tech manufacturing approach. Marketing relies significantly on E-commerce and social media platforms.

In 2021, Genki commence expansion into the U.S. market. An initial pilot trial sale deal was signed in Costco mostly in San Francisco Bay Area outlets.

Genki Forest marketed its products using Japanese-style packaging to give the perception of high quality. However in 2023, Genki Forest re-branded to Chi Forest to giving it more “China-influenced”.

In January 2026, Bloomberg reported that Chi Forest was considering an initial public offering on the Hong Kong Stock Exchange. A company representative said it had no plans for an IPO at that time.
