= Yang Xizi =

Chinese actress and singer (born 2000)

- 杨肸子
- Born: 18 March 2000 (age 26); Kaili, Guizhou, China
- Occupations: Actress; singer
- Years active: 2013–present

Yang Xizi (Chinese: 杨肸子; pinyin: Yáng Xīzǐ, born 18 March 2000) is a Chinese actress and singer. She first became known in 2013 as a child singer on the talent show Come Sing with Me. She made her acting debut in 2016 as the lead in the youth series Gardenia 2017, and she later appeared in the fantasy dramas Love and Redemption, The Promise of Chang'an and Immortal Samsara. Her leading roles include the youth series Moments of Youth (2024) and the coming-of-age drama Always Home (2025).

== Early life ==
Yang was born on 18 March 2000 in Kaili, Guizhou. She is of Miao ethnicity, and her Miao name, Amanduolei, means "little girl", "lovely" and "nimble" in Chinese.

== Career ==
=== 2013–2015: Singing ===
In 2013, Yang took part as a singer in the children's talent show Voice of the New Generation, which first brought her public attention. She later appeared on the music programmes Music Honours Student and Come Sing with Me. In May 2015, she was among the young performers in a student troupe organised by the Overseas Chinese Affairs Office of the State Council, which opened a tour of Japan with a performance in Tokyo and was due to continue to Yokohama and Kobe.

=== 2016–2022: Early acting roles ===
In 2016, Yang made her acting debut in the leading role of Bai Youyou, a girl who is outwardly gentle but inwardly determined, in the youth series Gardenia 2017, which was filmed in Qingdao. She went on to appear in Boyhood, a baseball drama starring the boy band TFBoys that aired on Hunan Television in 2017, and in the series Old Boy, which aired in 2018. In 2018, she also appeared on the singing programme Guofeng Youth, where her performances included a Miao-style song and a song performed with two other singers, for which she wore the uniform of a schoolgirl of the Republican era.

In 2020, Yang played Lu Yanran, also called Xiao Yinhua, a loyal guardian of her mistress, in the fantasy series Love and Redemption, which premiered on Youku on 6 August. In November that year, she was announced as the female lead, Wen Heng, in Ten Years of Loving You, an adaptation of a web novel that Shuhai Cangsheng began writing in 2009, and filming began on 22 November. Reports had linked the role to Yang Zi and later to Yuan Bingyan before Yang, then a newcomer, was cast.

In 2021, Yang played Liu Misha, a headstrong princess from a foreign state, in The Promise of Chang'an, starring Cheng Yi and Zhang Yuxi, which began airing on Hunan Television on 8 August. In 2022, she appeared in the historical drama The Imperial Age, which premiered on Beijing Television and Youku in April. That summer, she played Linlang, a fox princess, in Immortal Samsara, which was released in two parts on Youku.

=== 2023–present: Leading roles ===
In 2023, Yang was part of the main cast of Love Me Love My Voice, a romance series starring Tan Jianci and Zhou Ye, which premiered on Tencent Video on 30 November. In January 2024, she starred in Moments of Youth, a youth series set in the 1990s, as She Zhenzhen, a motorcycle-riding student of car repair at a vocational school, and the series premiered on iQIYI on 26 January. In July, she starred with Sun Chenjun in the fantasy romance Jade of the Human World, which was released on iQIYI on 31 July.

Filming of Always Home, an adaptation of a novel by Xiao Ge published on Douban Read, began in Fuzhou in January 2024, with Yang as the female lead, Chen Huan'er. The series follows Chen and her friends from 2008 to 2018 as they grow up, from high school to adulthood. Filming ended in April 2024, and the series premiered on Tencent Video on 15 February 2025. In January 2025, filming was completed on the fantasy series The Boundless Bright Moon, in which she plays Hanyue, a saintess of the Xiao tribe.

Yang also appeared in A Moment But Forever, a fantasy romance starring Tang Yan and Liu Xueyi, which she filmed in 2023 and which premiered on iQIYI and Youku on 27 March 2025. In 2025, she took part in the third season of the acting competition Infinity and Beyond. In the final episode, she and Ke Chun performed a scene from Sweet 1990, which the industry guests praised, and by the end of the season in June, she had received offers for five roles, including one in a large Youku period drama. In the crime series Beneath the Undertow, starring Chen Jianbin, Chen Ruoxuan and Li Xirui, she played Shen Xiaozhou, and the series premiered on Migu Video on 31 July 2025. In 2026, she played Duan Jingyuan in Love Beyond the Grave, a fantasy romance directed by Qin Zhen and starring Dilraba Dilmurat and Chen Feiyu, which was released on Tencent Video on 28 March.

=== Music and charity work ===
In January 2020, Yang performed the song "Big Fish" with two other young singers on the CCTV-15 programme Tongsheng Chang. She has recorded songs for the soundtracks of Love and Redemption and Immortal Samsara. Her song "Wish", from the soundtrack of Love and Redemption, was released on 14 August 2020. In 2025, she recorded "Lake" for the soundtrack of the series Deep Affection Eyes and released the singles "Our Midsummer" and "TA", the latter on 25 December.

In November 2022, the China Children's Charity Relief Foundation named Yang and other young actors from Huanrui Century, including Sun Zeyuan, as ambassadors for children in difficulty, as part of a campaign to raise support for their protection.

== Filmography ==
=== Television series ===
Year	English title	Chinese title	Role	Notes	Ref.
2017	Gardenia 2017	栀子花开2017	Bai Youyou	Lead role	
2017	Boyhood	我们的少年时代			
2018	Old Boy	老男孩			
2020	Love and Redemption	琉璃	Lu Yanran (Xiao Yinhua)		
2021	The Promise of Chang'an	与君歌	Liu Misha		
2022	The Imperial Age	山河月明			
2022	Immortal Samsara	沉香如屑·沉香重华	Linlang	Released in two parts	
2023	Love Me Love My Voice	很想很想你			
2024	Moments of Youth	明天的少年	She Zhenzhen	Lead role	
2024	Jade of the Human World	念念人间玉		Lead role	
2025	Always Home	树下有片红房子	Chen Huan'er	Lead role	
2025	A Moment But Forever	念无双			
2025	Beneath the Undertow	暗潮缉凶	Shen Xiaozhou		
2026	Love Beyond the Grave	白日提灯	Duan Jingyuan		
TBA	Ten Years of Loving You	十年一品温如言	Wen Heng	Lead role, filming began in November 2020	
TBA	The Boundless Bright Moon	明月苍茫	Hanyue	Filming completed in January 2025	
TBA	New Liaozhai	新聊斋	Ruan Xiaoxie		

=== Variety shows ===
Year	English title	Chinese title	Notes	Ref.
2013	Come Sing with Me	中国新声代	Contestant	
2018	Guofeng Youth	国风美少年	Performer	
2025	Infinity and Beyond (season 3)	无限超越班 第三季	Contestant	

== Discography ==
Year	English title	Chinese title	Notes	Ref.
2020	"Wish"	愿	Love and Redemption soundtrack	
2025	"Lake"	湖泊	Deep Affection Eyes soundtrack	
2025	"Our Midsummer"	我们的盛夏	Single	
2025	"TA"	TA	Single	
