= Noble Aspirations =

Chinese television series

- Promotional poster
- Also known as: The Legend of Chusen; Zhu Xian: Qing Yun Zhi

Chinese name
- Traditional Chinese: 青雲志
- Simplified Chinese: 青云志
Transcriptions
Standard Mandarin
- Hanyu Pinyin: Qīng Yún Zhì
- Genre: Xianxia
- Based on: Zhu Xian by Xiao Ding
- Written by: Shao Xiaoyi; Zhang Shaowei
- Directed by: Zhu Ruibin; Liu Guohui; Zhou Yuanzhou; Zhang Jian
- Starring: Li Yifeng; Zhao Liying; Yang Zi; Cheng Yi; Qin Junjie
- Opening theme: "Floating Pearl" by Jason Zhang
- Ending theme: "Time and Words" by Zhang Bichen
- Composers: Ikurō Fujiwara; Seikou Nagaoka
- Country of origin: China
- Original language: Mandarin
- No. of seasons: 2
- No. of episodes: 55 (Season 1); 18 (Season 2)

Production
- Executive producers: Gao Xinjie; Zeng Minghui
- Producer: Deng Xibin
- Production locations: Yunnan, Jiangxi, Guangxi, Hunan, Fujian, Zhejiang, Henan
- Production companies: H&R Century Pictures Co., Ltd

Original release
- Network: Hunan Television
- Release: 31 July – 8 November 2016
- Network: Tencent Video
- Release: 8 December 2016

Related
- Jade Dynasty

Noble Aspirations (Chinese: 青云志; pinyin: Qīng Yún Zhì), also known as The Legend of Chusen, is a 2016 Chinese xianxia television series based on Xiao Ding (萧鼎)'s best-seller novel Zhu Xian. Produced by H&R Century Pictures Co., Ltd, the series stars Li Yifeng, Zhao Liying, Yang Zi, Cheng Yi and Qin Junjie in the leading roles.

The first season aired from 31 July to 8 November 2016 on Hunan TV. The second season premiered on 8 December 2016 on Tencent Video.

== Synopsis ==
=== Season One ===
Zhang Xiaofan (Li Yifeng), and childhood friend Lin Jingyu (Cheng Yi), are the sole survivors of a village massacre. The two are accepted into the Qing Yun sect, where they learn the ways of the Immortal Sword. Although he is hardworking and determined, Xiaofan struggles to catch up to his peers due to his slow wit. One day, he acquires a "dementor sword" by chance when he was training in the mountains.

During the martial arts competition held within Qing Yun sect, Xiaofan enters the Top 4. Together with Lu Xueqi (Yang Zi), Lin Jingyu and Zeng Shushu (Qin Junjie), he heads to the Bat Cave in Mt Kongsan to investigate the trails of the demonic sect. There, Xiaofan encounters danger and pivotal circumstances make him grow and mature. Along the journey, he meets Bi Yao (Zhao Liying), daughter of the Ghost King. Their relationship slowly grows and takes a meaningful turn through these difficult times.

However, the villainous Ghost King attempts to overthrow the Qing Yun sect, and Xiaofan puts his life on the line. Bi Yao sacrifices herself to save him, falling into an endless sleep.

=== Season Two ===
After Bi Yao sacrifices her life to protect Zhang Xiaofan, she falls into an endless sleep. Devastated and vengeful, Xiaofan decides to devote his life to saving her. He enters the Ghost King's faction, and becomes his right-hand man Gui Li, also known as "Lord of Blood". He embarks on a quest with former allies Lin Jingyu and Lu Xueqi, as well as former enemies such as Qin Wuyan (Mao Zijun) to revive Bi Yao.

=== Season Three ===
Gui Li returns to the central plains to destroy the Zhu Xian sword to revive Bi Yao. However, as he tries to destroy the Zhu Xian sword, he was hurt by the sword's aura. Gui Li was saved by his former master, Pu Zhi, who reminds him of his original heart. He attains the fourth heavenly book from the back mountains of Tian Yin Pavilion. As he enters the Shiwan Mountain to kill the Beast God, he meets Lu Xueqi there and has a fierce battle with her. Gui Li realizes that he loves Lu Xueqi, and was only grateful toward Bi Yao. Gui Li intends to head back to Qing Yun sect to marry Lu Xueqi, but realizes that Dao Xuan has already been taken control of by the Zhu Xian sword. In the midst of battle, Lu Xueqi has no choice but to kill Tian Buyi as he was controlled by Dao Xuan. Unable to accept the death of his former master, Gui Li left Qing Yun. The Ghost Lord went into a craze, causing the Huqi Mountains to be destroyed and Bi Yao's body to be lost. Gui Li's ten-year-wish to revive Bi Yao suddenly falls empty, and realizing the importance of true love, he decides to go look for Lu Xueqi. The Ghost Lord finally revives Bi Yao, and passes to her an overwhelming force of cultivation. Facing his former lover and the common people of the world, Gui Li finally understands that evil and kindness are ultimately decided by one's heart. With the help of Lu Xueqi, he rebuilds the Zhu Xian sword, and then spends the rest of his life with Lu Xueqi.

== Cast ==
=== Main ===
| Actor | Character | Introduction |
|---|---|---|
| Li Yifeng; Roy Wang (young) | Zhang Xiaofan (张小凡); Gui Li (鬼厉) | Determined, loyal and brave, Zhang Xiaofan starts out as a man with mediocre skills despite his hard work. By chance, he is able to learn the skills of the Heavenly book, and becomes the first person to possess cultivation from Fu (Buddhist), Dao (Taoist), and Mo (Heretics). He obtains the Striking Blood Pearl (噬血珠) from Pu Zhi, one of four reverent masters of Tian Yin Pavilion, and a black stick object called Sucking Soul Club (噬魂) from the Da Zhu Pavilion's lake in the back mountain. Both merges with his blood to become a blood magic object. Later, his soul is trapped by the He Huan bell, causing him to transform into Gui Li, also known as Master of Blood. He thereafter wanders the world in search of a way to revive Bi Yao. And in the end falls in love with Xue Qi. |
| Zhao Liying; Zhang Zimu (young) | Bi Yao (碧瑶) | Daughter of the Ghost King and Xiao Chi. She wields the Broken Heart Flowers (伤心花) and Happy Reunion Bell (合欢铃). Beautiful, spunky and bright, Biyao is a noble girl who will do anything for love regardless of other people's opinions. She falls in love with Zhang Xiaofan after witnessing his courage and loyalty. She died for Zhang Xiaofan under the Zhu Xian Sword, causing the transformation of his lifetime. |
| Yang Zi | Lu Xueqi (陆雪琪) | Disciple of Mt. Xiaozhu. Known for her incomparable beauty and icy cold personality, Lu Xueqi is one of the most skillful and talented disciples of the Qing Yun sect. She wields the Tianya Magical Sword (天琊剑) and specializes in the Thunder Driven Spell (神剑御雷真诀). She is an upright and law-abiding person who hates associating with the evil. She falls in love with Zhang Xiaofan after undergoing life and death situations with him. |
| Cheng Yi; Wang Junkai (young) | Lin Jingyu (林惊羽) | Disciple of Mt. Longshou. He possesses extraordinary skills and potential, and becomes the first disciple of Discipline Hall under Cangsong. Later, he comes under the tutelage of Wan Jianyi, and was given the Slaying Dragon Sword (斩龙剑). He is childhood friends with Zhang Xiaofan, and likes Jin Ping'er. |
| Qin Junjie | Zeng Shushu (曾书书) | Disciple of Mt. Fenghui and Zeng Shuchang's son. He wields the Xuanyuan Sword (轩辕剑) and specializes in the Qingmu Magic Incarnation (秦木法咒). He is a humorous, easygoing and quirky man who is known for coming up with many new inventions and techniques. He later inherits the position of Chief of Yu Du City from his grandfather. He is good friends with Zhang Xiaofan, and has an unrequited crush on Lu Xueqi. |

=== Supporting ===
==== Qing Yun Sect (青云门) ====
| Actor | Character | Introduction |
|---|---|---|
Mt. Tongtian (通天峰)
| He Zhonghua | Reverend Daoxuan (道玄真人) | 18th leader of Qing Yun sect, head of Mt. Tongtian. He attempts to use the Zhu Xian sword (诛仙剑) to kill Zhang Xiaofan, which was blocked by Bi Yao's infatuation curse. |
| Liu Xueyi | Xiao Yicai (萧逸才) | Senior disciple of Mt. Tongtian; known as the number one disciple of Qing Yun sect. He wields the Seven Star Sword (七星剑). He drank the blood of the Heavenly Beast to infiltrate the Demon sect, causing him to turn into a beast every full moon. He was sent by the Ghost King to spy on the Qing Yun sect, but he actually hates the Ghost King and attempts many times to harm Bi Yao. Later, he becomes possessed due to his desire for power. |
Mt. Da Zhu (大竹峰)
| Xie Ning | Tian Buyi (田不易) | Head of Mt. Dazhu. Zhang Xiaofan's teacher and Tian Ling'er's father. He wields the Chi Yan Sword (赤焰剑). He is strict but caring toward his disciples, particularly Zhang Xiaofan. |
| Yang Mingna | Su Ru (苏茹) | Shui Yue's junior sister, Tian Buyi's wife and Tian Ling'er's mother. She wields the Mo Xue Sword (墨雪剑). She is strong but gentle, acting as a mother figure to the disciples. |
| Tang Yixin; Xu Shuo (young) | Tian Ling'er (田灵儿) | Tian Buyi and Su Ru's daughter. She wields the Amber Silk (琥珀朱绫). She is Zhang Xiaofan's unrequited first love, senior sister and stands up for him when he is bullied. However, the one she loves is Qi Hao. |
| Zheng Guolin | Song Daren (宋大仁) | Senior disciple of Mt. Dazhu. He wields the Ten Tiger Sword (十虎). An honest and loyal man. |
| Ding Yi | Wu Dayi (吴大义) | Second disciple of Mt. Dazhu. |
| Ji Xiaobing | Zheng Dali (郑大礼) | Third disciple of Mt. Dazhu. |
| Jiang Zhenhao | He Dazhi (何大智) | Fourth disciple of Mt. Dazhu. He possesses the magic weapon, Jiang Shan Pen (江山笔). |
| Dai Zixiang | Lu Daxin (吕大信) | Fifth disciple of Mt. Dazhu. |
| Li Ze | Du Bishu (杜必书) | Sixth disciple of Mt. Dazhu. He possesses the magic weapon, Shenmu Dice (神木骰). A lively and chatty man who likes to gamble with others. |
Mt. Longshou (龙首峰)
| Lu Xingyu | Reverend Cangsong (苍松道人) | Head of Mt. Longshou and the Disciple Hall. A spy and assassin for Lian Xie Hall, who tries to steal the Striking Blood Pearl from Zhang Xiaofan and attempts to kill him. He held great respect for Wan Jianyi, and resents Daoxuan for expelling the latter. Later, he is killed by Zhang Xiaofan and Lin Jingyu but before he dies, he destroys the last remaining magical stone that could revive Bi Yao. |
| Chen Zeyu | Qi Hao (齐昊) | Senior disciple of Mt. Longshou. He likes Tian Ling'er. |
Mt. Xiaozhu (小竹峰)
| Jiang Hong | Shui Yue (水月) | Head of Mt. Xiaozhu. Su Ru's senior sister, Lu Xueqi and Wen Min's teacher. She is cold and strict. |
| Ma Chengcheng | Wen Min (文敏) | Disciple of Mt. Xiaozhu. Song Daren's fiancée (wife) and Lu Xueqi's senior sister. |
Mt. Fenghui (风回峰)
| Zong Fengyan | Zeng Shuchang (曾书常) | Head of Mt. Fenghui. Zeng Shushu's father. |
| Li Yin | Peng Chang (彭昌) | Zhang Xiaofan's second competitor in the martial arts competition. |
Mt. Chaoyang (朝阳峰)
| Ge Ziming | Shang Zhengliang (商正梁) | Head of Mt. Chaoyang. He was attacked by Xiao Yicai and his cultivation sucked away by him, and became gravely injured and fell into permanent unconsciousness. |
| Lu Yulin | Chu Yuhong (楚誉宏) | Zhang Xiaofan's first competitor in the martial arts competition. |
| Wang Leifang | Kun Tiandou (申天斗) | |
Mt. Luoxia (落霞峰)
| Wang Bin | Reverend Tianyun (天云道人) | Head of Mt. Luoxia. He died during the rebellion staged by Cangsong. |
Grandmaster Ancestral Shrine (祖师祠堂)
| Huang Haibing | Wan Jianyi (万剑一) | A mysterious old man residing at the Grand Master Ancestral Chamner, who guards the Zhu Xian sword. Ex-disciple of Mt. Tongtian. Hundred years ago, he was in a relationship with You Ji, but they could not be together as they were from opposing sects, and he was expelled from Qingyun sect. He later becomes Lin Jingyu's teacher. |

==== Tian Yin Pavilion (天音阁) ====
| Actor | Character | Introduction |
|---|---|---|
| Wu Yue | Pu Zhi (普智) | One of the four reverent masters of Tian Yin Pavilion. Zhang Xiaofan's first teacher, who passed on Tian Yin sect's hidden skill to Zhang Xiaofan. Under the influence of the Striking Blood Pearl, he killed Zhang Xiaofan's entire village. |
| Leon Lee | A Xiang (阿相) | Senior disciple of Tian Yin Pavilion. He possesses the Reincarnation Pearl (轮回珠). Zhang Xiaofan's good friend. He likes Ding Ling, whom he was engaged to since young. |
| Guo Kaimin | Pu Hong (普泓) | Chief of Tian Yin Pavilion. One of the four great reverends of Tian Yin Pavilion. A Xiang's teacher. |
| Liu Bo | Pu Kong (普空) | One of the four great reverends of Tian Yin Pavilion. |

==== Ghost King Faction (鬼王宗) ====
| Actor | Character | Introduction |
|---|---|---|
| Fu Chengpeng | Archlord Ghost King (鬼王) | Head of the Ghost King faction. Bi Yao's father and Xiao Chi's husband. He is unpredictable, ambitious and crafty. He aims to unite the Demon sect. |
| Xiong Naijin | You Ji (幽姬) | One of the four messengers of the Ghost King faction: Zhu Que (朱雀”). Biological aunt of Bi Yao. She used to be in a relationship with Wan Jianyi, but the rivalry between their sects forced them to separate. |
| Yang Xuwen | Qing Long (青龙) | Head of the four messengers of the Ghost King faction. He is highly skilled and possesses the Qian Kun Green Light Ring (乾坤清光戒). He is cruel and calculative toward his enemy, but fiercely loyal to the Ghost King. He is Bi Yao's big brother and a long time friend of Qin Wuyan. |
| Liu Can | Mr Ghost (鬼先生) | A man of mysterious origins who was born in Fen Xiang Valley and later became a subordinate of the Ghost King. Also called Ghost Doctor (鬼医), he is knowledgeable and serves as the Ghost King's advisor. |

==== Hundred Poison sect (万毒门) ====
| Actor | Character | Introduction |
|---|---|---|
| Mao Zijun | Yan Lie (颜烈); Qin Wuyan (秦无炎) | Also known as Poison Master (毒公子), third young master of the Ghost King faction.A very close friend of Qing Long Disciple of Hundred Poison sect. He wields the Slaying Demon Flute (控妖笛). He initially disguises himself as a guard named Yan Lie to enter Yu Du City. Cold, cruel and calculative, he does not show his true emotions except when he is in front of his love, Bi Yao. He is unwilling to do the bidding of the Poison Deity, but has no choice as his body is controlled by him. |
| Wang Weihua | Poison Deity (毒神) | Chief of Hundred Poison sect. Bai Duzi and Qin Wuyan's teacher. He wields the magical artifact Zhan Xiang Si (斩相思). |
| Guo Xin | Sucking Blood Old Demon (吸血老妖) | One of Poison Deity's disciples. |
| Liu Can | Bai Duzi (百毒子) | One of Poison Deity's disciples. |

==== He Huan Sect (合欢派) ====
| Actor | Character | Introduction |
|---|---|---|
| Jiao Junyan | Jin Ping'er (金瓶儿) | Also known as Master Miao (妙公子), one of the three young masters of the Ghost King faction. She wields the Purple Blade Knife (紫芒刃). She is strong-willed, crafty and known for her clear distinction of kindness and grudges. She was saved by Xiao Huan when she was young, and treats her and Zhou Yixian as family. She opens a clothes workshop in Yu Du, which takes in homeless women and imparts them tailor-making skills. However, she was later framed by Qin Wuyan and left Yu Du, and came under the Ghost King. After she met Lin Jingyu, she fell in love with him, and thereafter secretly assisted him and his friends to escape from the Ghost King. |
| Zeng Li | Lady Jinling (金铃夫人) | Founder of He Huan sect, and original owner of the Happy Reunion Bell. She sacrifices herself to seal the Beast Demon by reciting the Infatuation spell. She was lovers with Black Heart Old Man. |

==== Lian Xie Hall (炼血堂) ====
| Actor | Character | Introduction |
|---|---|---|
| Chen Chuang | Yegou Daoren (野狗道人) | Disciple of Lian Xie Hall. He later becomes Gui Li's right-hand man. He appears tough but is kind in nature. He likes Zhou Xiaohuan. |
| Xiu Qing | Black Heart Old Man (黑心老人) | Founder of Lian Xie Hall, and original owner of the Striking Blood Pearl. He was lovers with Lady Jinling, and killed himself after her death at the Blood Drop Cave. |
| Zhang Fan | Elder Nian (年老大) | Chief of Lian Xie Hall. He went undercover near Qing Yun sect for five years in order to steal the Striking Blood Pearl, but was later defeated by Zhang Xiaofan and his friends. |

==== Fen Xiang Valley (焚香谷) ====
| Actor | Character | Introduction |
|---|---|---|
| Yang Zihua | Yun Yilan (云易岚) | Master of Fen Xiang Valley. Li Xun's teacher. |
| Qin Shuo | Li Xun (李洵) | Disciple of Fen Xiang Valley. Zeng Shushu's older cousin. He wields the Jiu Yang Ruler (九阳尺). Arrogant and prideful, he often goes against Zhao Xiaofan and his friends. |
| Liang Jingxian | Yan Hong (燕虹) | Disciple of Fen Xiang Valley. She is brash, forward and capricious. |
| Chang Cheng | Shangguan Ce (上官策) | Elder of Fen Xiang Valley. He possesses the magical artifact, Nine Cold Frozen Ice Thorn (九寒凝冰剌). An ambitious and greedy man. He later becomes possessed and was killed by Li Xun. |

==== Yu Du City (渝都城) ====
| Actor | Character | Introduction |
|---|---|---|
| Bai Xue | Xiao Huan (小环) | Zhou Yixian's granddaughter. She has a special gift to foresee the future called Heaven Eye (天眼), and is also able to use Yang energy to lengthen people's lives. She is good friends with Zhang Xiaofan, Lu Xueqi and Jin Ping'er; and often squabbles with Zeng Shushu. She likes Zhang Xiaofan. |
| Zhao Lixin | Zhou Yixian (周一仙) | A mysterious wandering swordsman who is skilled in divination. He possesses the long-lost skill of Qing Yun sect by the founder Qing Yunzi; and has a vast knowledge. Xiao Huan's grandfather. He used to be friends with the Ghost King. |
| Yang Guang | Wei Qiong (卫琼) | Zeng Shushu and Li Xun's grandfather. Chief of Yu Du City. He later sacrificed himself to ward off the Beast God, and turns into a stone. |
| Zhang Weina | Ding Ling (丁玲) | Ah Xiang's love interest. She has a sisterly bond with Jin Ping'er, and later inherits her position as the boss of the Embroidery Shop. |
| Zhao Chulun | Chief of Guan Xing Mt (观星崖崖主) | An immortal who saved Zhao Xiaofan when he was poisoned. |

==== Chang Sheng Hall (长生堂) ====
| Actor | Character | Introduction |
|---|---|---|
| Qian Yongcheng | Yu Yangzi (玉阳子) | Chief of Chang Sheng Hall. A witty and cunning man. |
| Yang Meichen | Meng Ji (孟骥) | Yu Yangzi's subordinate. |
| Jia Zhengyu | Zhou Yin (周隐) | A member of Chang Sheng Hall, who possesses the Li Ren Pyramid. Known as the Assassin, he secretly attacks the Qing Yun sect but was chased away by Wan Jianyi's attacks. |

==== Eastern Sea's Ding Hai Mountain Villa (东海定海山庄) ====
| Actor | Character | Introduction |
|---|---|---|
| Zhang Xin | Situ Xiao (司徒逍) | Young chief of Ding Hai Mountain Villa. He loves Yun Shu. |
| Hua Jiao | Yun Shu (云舒) | Daughter of the Sea Tribe. She becomes a servant at Ding Hai Mountain Villa, and falls in love with Situ Xiao. Later, she sacrificed herself to save Situ Xiao. |

==== Little River Town (Heavenly Fox tribe) (小池镇天狐族） ====
| Actor | Character | Introduction |
|---|---|---|
| Shu Chang | Xiao Bai (小白) | A nine-tailed heavenly fox. Liu Wei's mother and Xiao Chi's older sister. She was trapped at Fen Xiang Valley for three hundred years, but was later saved by Gui Li and helped prevent the Heavenly Beast from reviving. |
| Wang Wanjuan | Xiao Chi (小痴) | Wife of the Ghost King, Bi Yao's mother and Xiao Bai's little sister. She died in the Grass Temple Village's cave after being pursued by Elder Nian. |
| Ren Jialun | Liu Wei (六尾) | A six-tailed fox demon. Xiao Bai's son and Xiao Qi's big brother. He later died together with his wife in the Black Stone Hole. |
| Tang Jingmei | San Wei (三尾) / San Niang (三娘) | A three-tailed fox demon. Liu Wei's wife. |
| Jackson Yee | Xiao Qi (小七) | Liu Wei's little brother. A wild fox demon saved by Zhang Xiaofan, who later lives together with the Heavenly Fox Tribe. |
| Tong Mengshi | Shi Tou (石头) | Disciple of Jin Gang sect. A half demon and half human. |

==== Others ====
| Actor | Character | Introduction |
|---|---|---|
| Liu Chang | Bing Qiqi (冰琦琦) | Xiao Qi's good friend. Former identity of Lu Xueqi, the daughter of Heaven and Earth. |
| Wang Bowen | Luo Ye (骆野)) | A sand bandit who attacked Zhang Xiaofan and friends. |
| Wang Renjun | | Zhang Xiaofan's father. |
| Siqin Gaoli | | Zhang Xiaofan's mother. |
| Ren Xuehai | Old Village Head | |
| Wang Gang | Second Uncle Wang | |

== Production ==
The Golden Horse Award winner, Shirley Chan serves as the stylist and the Hong Kong Film Award laureate, Bill Lui, serves as the art director. Fang Sizhe serves as the clothes designer. Stunt director Chen Weitao helped designed the wushu stunts and fighting styles for each character. The production of special effects is handled by South Korean company IOFX.

=== Casting ===
On September 24, 2015, singers Roy Wang, Wang Junkai, and Jackson Yi from TFBOYS were cast in the drama. On December 5, actress Yang Zi attended the commencement ceremony, and the producers announced that she was cast as Lu Xueqi, one of the two female leads. On December 19, Wu Yue, Zhao Lixin and Chen Chuang joined the cast during filming.

On January 12, 2016, the television series's official Sina Weibo announced that Li Yifeng had been signed on to star as Zhang Xiaofan, the protagonist of Noble Aspirations. On January 25, it announced that Zhao Liying landed the female lead role of Bi Yao.

=== Filming ===
Principal photography started on 5 December 2015 at Hengdian Studios and wrapped up on 29 April 2016. The scenes of the drama were shot in various parts of China, such as Yunnan, Jiangxi, Guangxi, Hunan, Fujian, Zhejiang, and Henan. The total investment of the television series reaches ¥ 60 million, with majority of the budget going to special effects.

The scenes set in Qing Yun Mountain (青雲山) were filmed in Laojun Mountain, in Luanchuan County, Henan province. The monkey groups scenes in the Qing Yun Mountain were filmed in Huangshan, Anhui province. The scenes set in Heyang Castle (河陽城) were filmed in Hengdian World Studios, in Dongyang, Zhejiang province. The Liuboshan scenes (流波山) were filmed in Erhai Lake, Yunnan.

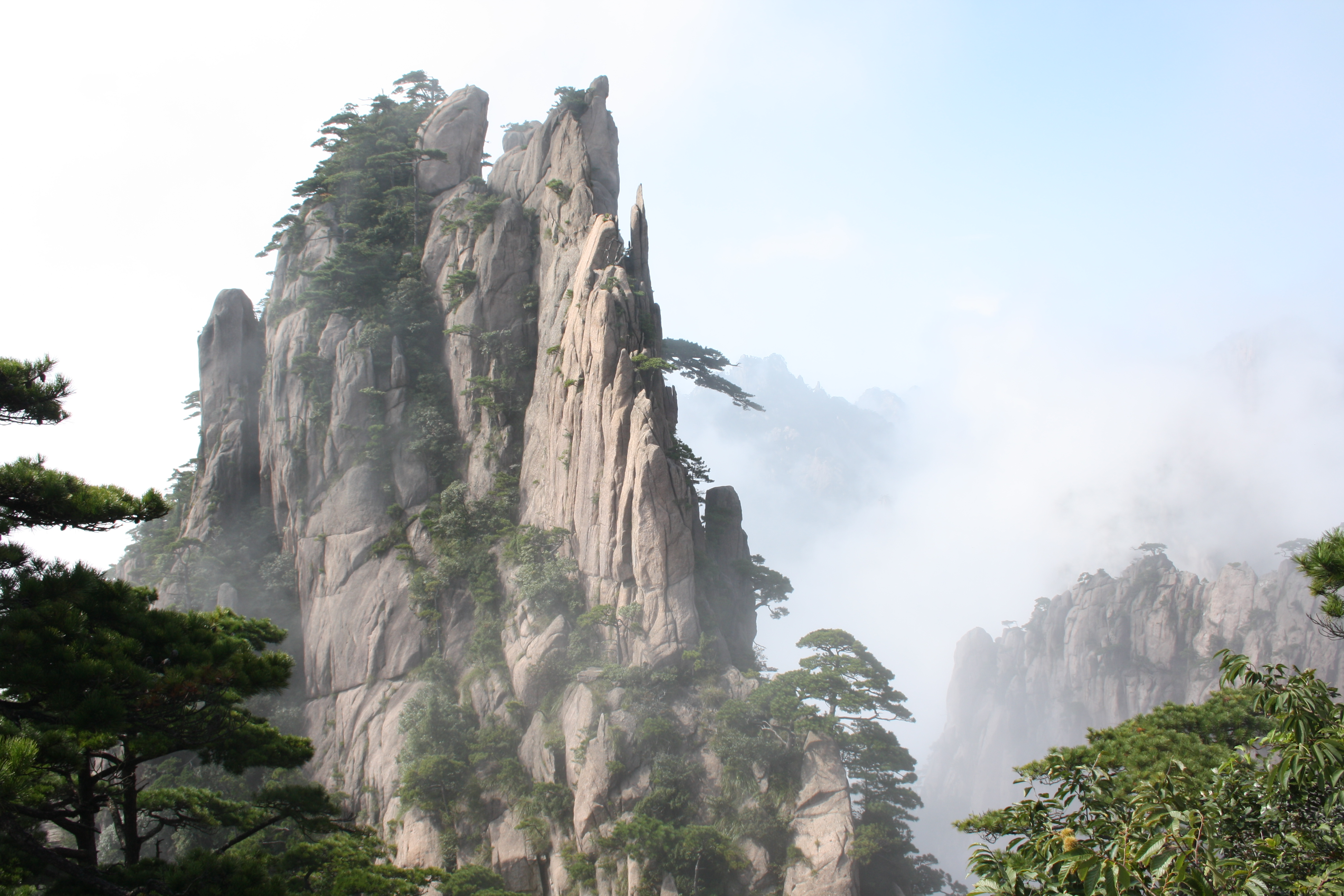
Shixinfeng of Huangshan, Anhui.

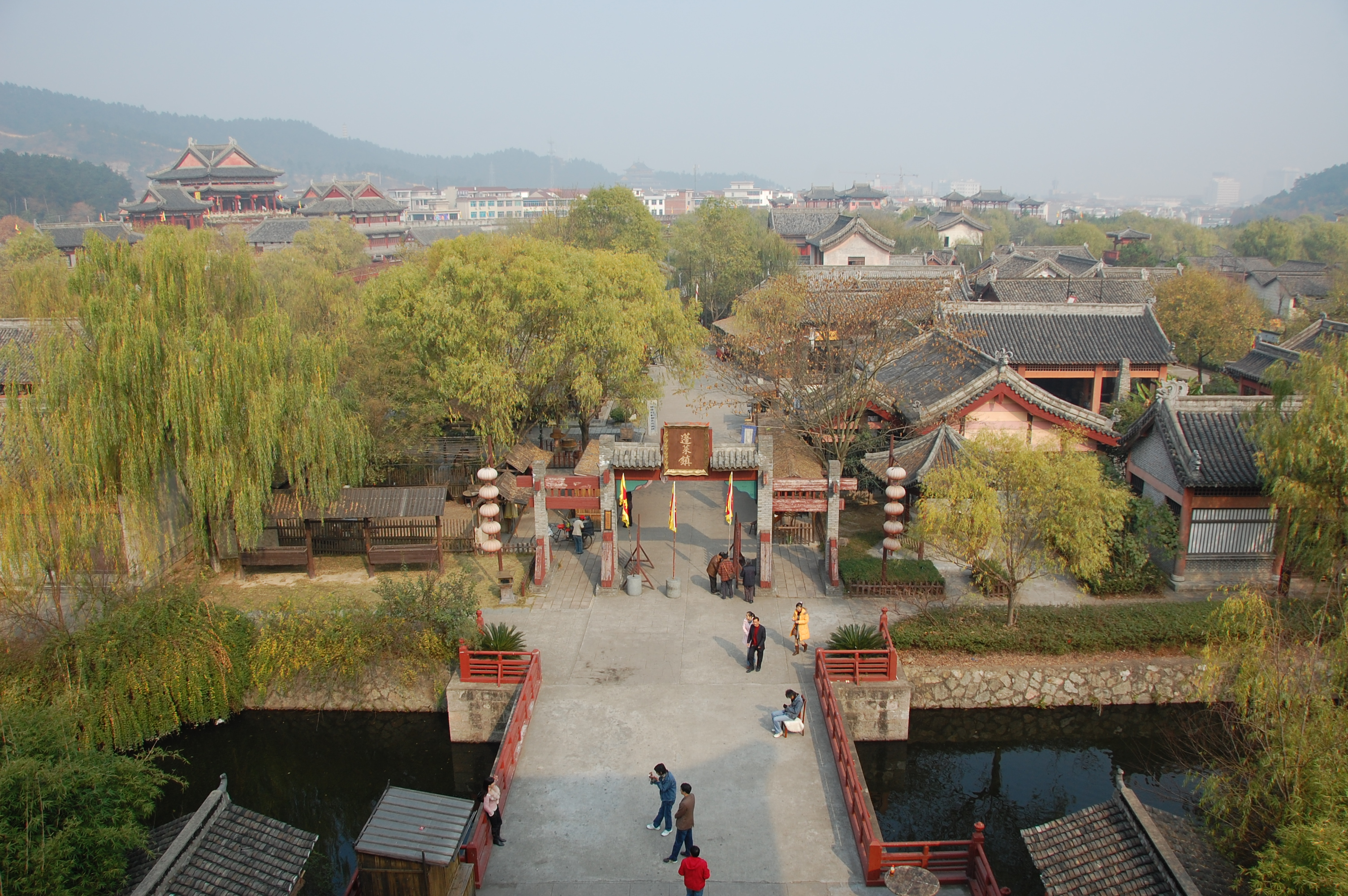
Hengdian World Studios, Dongyang, Zhejiang province

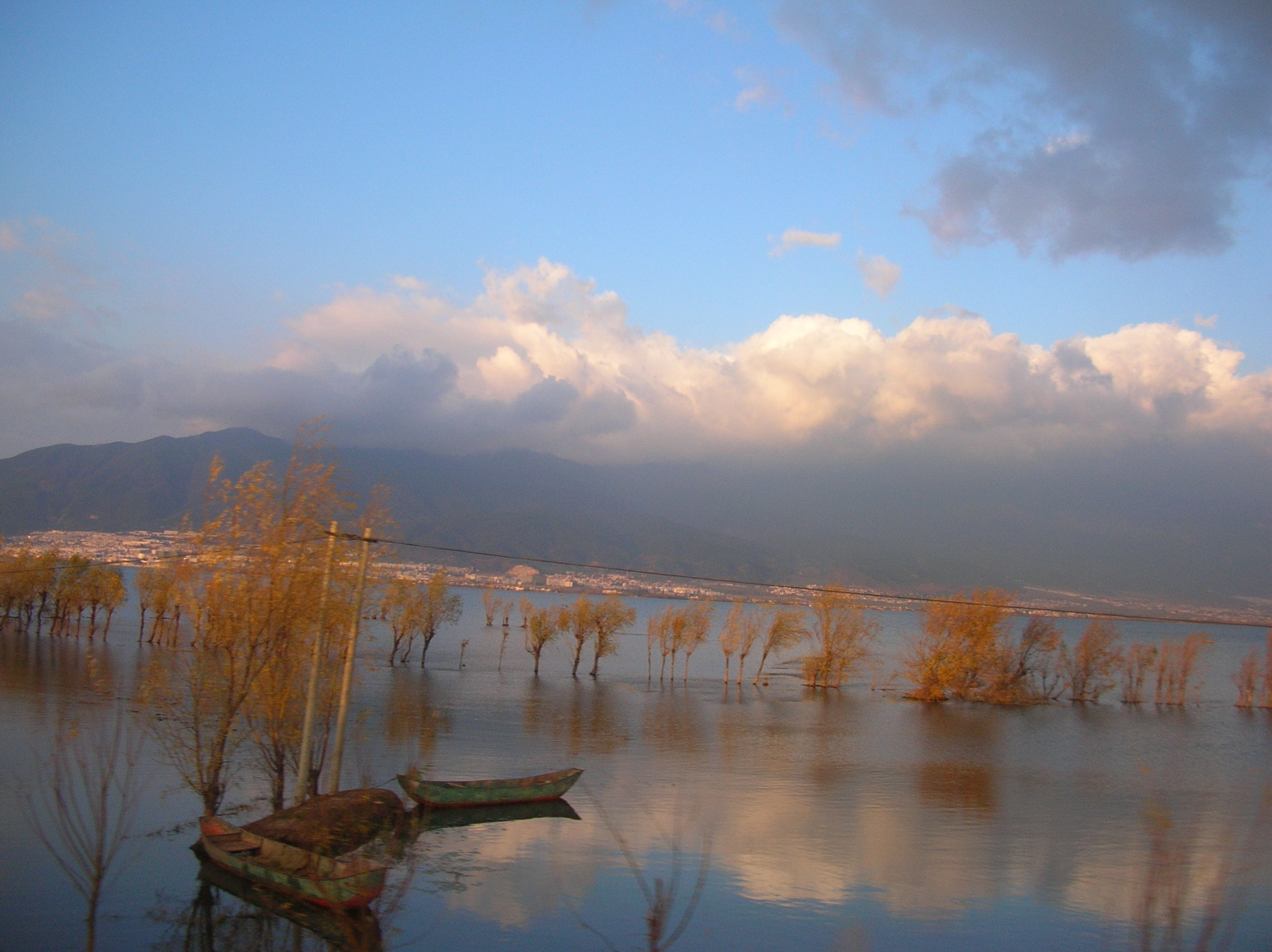
Erhai Lake, Yunnan.

== Soundtrack ==
Noble Aspirations Original Soundtrack (OST)

Soundtrack album by Various artists
- Released: July 2, 2016
- Genre: Mandopop; Instrumental
- Language: Mandarin
- Label: Shanghai Xigua Music Production Co., Ltd.

The television series's soundtrack is composed by Japanese composers Ikuro Fujiwara and Seikou Nagaoka, who have previously worked on the film Painted Skin (2008) and Dr. Jin respectively. "Have You Ever Loved", "If We Never Met" and "Broken Heart Flower" were not included in the album and were released as solo singles.

| No. | Title | Lyrics | Music | Singers | Length |
|---|---|---|---|---|---|
| 1. | "Floating Pearl (浮诛)" (Opening theme) | Liu Chang | Seikou Nagaoka, Tan Xuan | Jason Zhang | 01:40 |
| 2. | "Time and Words (时光笔墨)" (Ending theme) | Dai Yuedong | Ikuro Fujiwara | Zhang Bichen | 03:10 |
| 3. | "Thought of Renunciation (离思)" (Interlude) | Tian Chenming | Huo Zun | Henry Huo | 04:34 |
| 4. | "Ballad of Green Cloth (青衣谣)" (Bi Yao's theme song) | Zhou Jieying | Tan Xuan | Yisa Yu | 04:50 |
| 5. | "Have You Ever Loved (你有没有深爱过)" (Lu Xueqi's theme song) | Ge Dawei, Lv Zhijie | Lv Zhijie | Rene Liu | 04:15 |
| 6. | "Hero's Path (英雄有路)" (Promotion song) | Zhou Jieying | Tan Xuan | Richie Ren | 04:42 |
| 7. | "Noble Aspirations (青云志)" (Concept song) | Liu Chang | Tan Xuan | Wu Junyu and Eleanor Lee | 03:10 |
| 8. | "If We Never Met (如果我们不曾相遇)" (Zhang Xiaofan's theme song) | Ashin | Ashin | Mayday | 03:21 |
| 9. | "A Crack in Time (时间裂缝)" (Gui Li's theme song) | Li Yifeng, Liu Sichen | Lu Hu | Li Yifeng | 04:26 |
| 10. | "Just Like When We First Met (若只如初见)" (Lu Xueqi's theme song) | Dai Yuedong | Tan Xuan | Yang Zi | 04:45 |
| 11. | "Zhu Xian (诛仙)" (Promotional song) | Liu Chang | Tan Xuan | Jam Hsiao | 04:30 |
| 12. | "Broken Heart Flower (伤心花)" (Biyao's theme song) | Hai Lei | Ding Peifeng | Jason Hong | 03:12 |

== Reception ==
=== Critical response ===
When the television series premiered on July 31, it received mainly positive reviews for its acting and production quality. The series was praised for its beautiful cinematography, exquisite costumes and music.

=== Commercial reception ===
The drama was a commercial success. It achieved a market share of 7.075 for its first two episodes, the highest record held by a Chinese drama for the year 2016. In October 2016, it surpassed 20 billion views, becoming the third drama to do so after The Journey of Flower and The Legend of Mi Yue. In December 2016, it became one of the most viewed drama online with over 25 billion views.

=== Ratings ===
China Hunan TV premiere ratings (CSM52)
| Episodes | Broadcast date | Ratings (%) | Audience share (%) | Ref |
| 1-2 | July 31, 2016 | 1.352 | 7.075 | |
| 3-4 | August 7, 2016 | 1.005 | 4.931 | |
| 5-6 | August 14, 2016 | 0.957 | 4.929 | |
| 7-8 | August 21, 2016 | 0.952 | 4.839 | |
| 9-10 | August 28, 2016 | 0.907 | 4.918 | |
| 11-12 | September 4, 2016 | 0.705 | 3.855 | |
| 13-14 | September 11, 2016 | 0.529 | 3.187 | |
| 15-16 | September 18, 2016 | 0.568 | 3.363 | |
| 17-18 | September 19, 2016 | 0.631 | 3.918 | |
| 19-20 | September 20, 2016 | 0.603 | 3.66 | |
| 21-22 | September 25, 2016 | 0.592 | 3.632 | |
| 23-24 | September 26, 2016 | 0.513 | 3.277 | |
| 25-26 | September 27, 2016 | 0.536 | 3.316 | |
| 27-28 | October 2, 2016 | 0.548 | 2.98 | |
| 29-30 | October 3, 2016 | 0.616 | 3.505 | |
| 31-32 | October 4, 2016 | 0.716 | 4.003 | |
| 33-34 | October 9, 2016 | 0.369 | 2.536 | |
| 35-36 | October 10, 2016 | 0.424 | 2.733 | |
| 37-38 | October 11, 2016 | 0.488 | 3.926 | |
| 39-40 | October 16, 2016 | 0.47 | 4.175 | |
| 41-42 | October 23, 2016 | 0.308 | 1.83 | |
| 43-44 | October 24, 2016 | 0.357 | 2.217 | |
| 45-46 | October 25, 2016 | 0.375 | 2.418 | |
| 47-48 | October 30, 2016 | 0.265 | 1.629 | |
| 49-50 | October 31, 2016 | 0.297 | 1.936 | |
| 51-52 | November 1, 2016 | 0.305 | 2.136 | |
| 53-54 | November 6, 2016 | 0.329 | 2.023 | |
| 55-56 | November 7, 2016 | 0.425 | 2.79 | |
| 57-58 | November 8, 2016 | 0.487 | 3.238 | |

Nationwide Ratings
| Episodes | Broadcast date | Ratings (%) | Audience share (%) | Ref |
| 1-2 | July 31, 2016 | 1.37 | 9.11 | |
| 3-4 | August 7, 2016 | 1.10 | 7.12 | |
| 5-6 | August 14, 2016 | 1.22 | 8.22 | |
| 7-8 | August 21, 2016 | 1.22 | 8.11 | |
| 9-10 | August 28, 2016 | 1.00 | 7.16 | |
| 11-12 | September 4, 2016 | 0.49 | 3.91 | |
| 13-14 | September 11, 2016 | 0.46 | 3.83 | |
| 15-16 | September 18, 2016 | 0.47 | 3.85 | |
| 17-18 | September 19, 2016 | 0.46 | 4.05 | |
| 19-20 | September 20, 2016 | 0.56 | 4.71 | |
| 21-22 | September 25, 2016 | 0.42 | 3.69 | |
| 23-24 | September 26, 2016 | 0.43 | 3.77 | |
| 25-26 | September 27, 2016 | 0.5 | 4.26 | |
| 27-28 | October 2, 2016 | 0.79 | 5.8 | |
| 29-30 | October 3, 2016 | 0.79 | 5.8 | |
| 31-32 | October 4, 2016 | 0.79 | 5.8 | |
| 33-34 | October 9, 2016 | 0.26 | 2.56 | |
| 35-36 | October 10, 2016 | 0.5 | 4.4 | |
| 37-38 | October 11, 2016 | 0.43 | 3.72 | |
| 39-40 | October 16, 2016 | 0.42 | 5.73 | |
| 41-42 | October 23, 2016 | 0.3 | 2.64 | |
| 43-44 | October 24, 2016 | 0.26 | 2.29 | |
| 45-46 | October 25, 2016 | 0.34 | 3.13 | |
| 47-48 | October 30, 2016 | 0.33 | 2.8 | |
| 49-50 | October 31, 2016 | 0.32 | 2.95 | |
| 51-52 | November 1, 2016 | 0.3 | 2.95 | |
| 53-54 | November 6, 2016 | 0.3 | 2.68 | |
| 55-56 | November 7, 2016 | 0.39 | 3.5 | |
| 57-58 | November 8, 2016 | 0.42 | 3.95 | |

- Highest ratings are marked in red, lowest ratings are marked in blue

== Awards and nominations ==
| Year | Award | Category | Nominated work | Result |
|---|---|---|---|---|
| 2016 | Tencent Video Star Awards | VIP Drama of the year | Noble Aspirations | Won |
| 2016 | Tencent Video Star Awards | VIP Star of the year | Li Yifeng | Won |
| 2016 | Tencent Video Star Awards | Most Popular TV Actor | Li Yifeng | Won |
| 2016 | Tencent Video Star Awards | Most Popular TV Actress | Zhao Liying | Won |
| 2016 | Tencent Video Star Awards | Artist with the Most Potential | Qin Junjie | Won |
| 2017 | 22nd Huading Awards | Best Actor | Li Yifeng | Rescinded |
| 2017 | 22nd Huading Awards | Best Actress (Costume drama) | Yang Zi | Nominated |
| 2017 | 22nd Huading Awards | Best New Actor | Qin Junjie | Nominated |
| 2017 | 22nd Huading Awards | Top 10 Dramas | Noble Aspirations | Won |

== International broadcast ==
- Malaysia - 8TV (Malaysia)

Global Broadcasting:

- Singapore, Malaysia, Thailand, Cambodia- Sony One
