= Kill Me Love Me =

2024 Chinese television series

- Official poster
- Genre: Revenge; Historical; Romance
- Based on: Chun Hua Yan by Hei Yan
- Written by: Wen Yan; Yang Xiaohan; Wang Yizhao; Gang Hongzhu; Xu Humiao
- Directed by: Cheng Lu; Huang Weijie
- Starring: Liu Xueyi; Wu Jinyan
- Opening theme: "Flame" (焰) by Curley G
- Country of origin: China
- Original language: Mandarin
- No. of seasons: 1
- No. of episodes: 32

Production
- Executive producers: Xie Ying; Liu Lu
- Producers: Quan Xianglan; Huang Yan; Ren Pang; Guo Lin; Bi Si
- Production location: Hengdian World Studios
- Cinematography: Zhao Yingchuan
- Running time: 45 minutes
- Production companies: Youku; Perfect World Pictures

Original release
- Network: Youku
- Release: October 14 – October 30, 2024

Kill Me Love Me (Chinese: 春花焰) is a 2024 Chinese television series based on the Web novel Chun Hua Yan by Hei Yan. It stars Liu Xueyi and Wu Jinyan in leading roles. The series premiered on Youku on October 14, 2024.

== Synopsis ==
Ten years ago, during the war among the kingdoms of Dayan, Xiyan, and Nanyue, Prince Murong Jinghe of Dayan, renowned for his combat skills, led the Weibei army to significant victories against Xiyan and reclaimed Qingzhou city. However, on his return to court to receive rewards, all the civilians of Qingzhou were massacred and he was attacked by the common people who blamed him for the tragedy. The attack decimated all his forces and made him disabled.

Mei Lin, an orphan of Qingzhou, swears to take revenge from Murong Jinghe and joins Shadow Works where she undergoes years of rigorous training to become an assassin. Soon the master of Shadow Works assigns her first mission which is to assassinate Murong Jinghe. Mei Lin enters the palace and waits for a chance to kill him not knowing that the one behind the Shadow Works is none other than Murong Jinghe himself.

== Cast and characters ==
=== Main ===
- Liu Xueyi as Murong Jinghe

Third prince of Dayan and General of Weibei army.

- Wu Jinyan as Mei Lin

=== Supporting ===
- Bi Wenjun as Yue Qin
- Baron Chen as Murong Xuanlie, Crown Prince of Dayan
- Zhao Xiaotang as Yin Luomei
- Huang Riying as Zi Gu
- Shao Weitong as Qing Yan
- Jiang Kai as Emperor Yan
- Xu Hao as Shu Mo
- Gao Junhai as Zhang Yin
- Zhao Yating as A Dai
- Hong Jiantao as Mei Dashan, Mei Lin's father
- Yang Mingna as Empress De Jia

== Soundtrack ==
No.	English title	Chinese title	Artist	Lyrics	Composer	Notes
1.	"Weariness of Spring Flowers"	春花厌	Jane Zhang	Shu Wang	Wen Shuyin	Theme song
2.	"Do Not Dare to Welcome Spring"	不敢逢春	Liu Yuning	Lin Qiao, Wu Shang	Wen Shuyin	
3.	"Flame"	焰	Curley G	Luo Luo, Ren Feifei	Wen Shuyin	Opening theme song
4.	"Flying Flowers Enter Dream"	飞花入梦	Deng Shen Me Jun	Yan Shiba	He Shimeng	
5.	"Have Regrets"	有憾	Freya Lin, William Wei	You Li	Tian Mozhen	
6.	"Emotionless"	绝念	Liu Xueyi	Zheng Zhihuan	Wang Jiyu	Promotional song
