= Zhou Keyu =

Chinese singer and actor

- Born: May 17, 2002 (age 24); United States
- Other name: Daniel Zhou
- Occupations: Singer; dancer; actor
- Years active: 2019–present
- Agent: Jay Walk Studio
- Musical career
- Genre: C-pop
- Instrument: Vocals
- Label: Wajijiwa (Note: As a member of Into1 only.)
- Formerly of: Into1

Chinese name
- Traditional Chinese: 周柯宇
- Simplified Chinese: 周柯宇
Transcriptions
Standard Mandarin
- Hanyu Pinyin: Zhōu Kēyǔ

Zhou Keyu (Chinese: 周柯宇; born May 17, 2002), also known by his English name Daniel Zhou, is an American born Chinese singer, dancer, and actor. He is also a member of the Chinese boy group BEST. He is a former member of the Chinese boy group Into1, after placing 10th in the final episode of Produce Camp 2021. He made his solo debut with the single "R.O.T.Y" on March 1, 2021.

== Early life ==
Zhou was born in the United States on May 17, 2002. He grew up in Beijing, China. He has two older brothers, and he grew up under their care due to having no contact with his father at the age of 7. Zhou renounced his US citizenship for the People's Republic of China.

== Career ==
=== 2018–2020: Career beginnings, and debut with Best ===
On December 14, 2018, Jaywalk Studio announced 14 new trainees under their company, Zhou being one of them. On December 10, 2019, Zhou debuted in the Chinese boy group BEST and released their single with the same name.

On July 23, 2020, Zhou as well as 32 others were introduced as guests on the Chinese talent variety show Happy Camp.

=== 2021–present: Debut with Into1 and solo endeavors ===
On February 18, 2021, he participated in the Chinese survival show program Produce Camp 2021. He consistently ranked within the Top 11 throughout the show, and on the final episode he placed 10th making him a member of the multi-national boy group Into1. On February 22, Zhou made his acting debut in the Chinese drama series Remember My Boy, as the lead. On March 1, he made his solo debut with the single "R.O.T.Y".

== Ambassadorships and endorsements ==
In 2021, Zhou promoted Sisley and became the brand ambassador of YUSUMTONG, Rejoice, Nivea Men, RIO, Moncler, Nestlé Coffee, as well as the brand spokesperson of Membrane Family and HBN.

In 2022, he became the youth brand ambassador of Kappa and promoted Tom Ford Beauty, while currently promoting Carslan.

Zhou also collaborated with luxury fashion houses including Gucci, Fendi, and Coach.

== Discography ==
=== Studio albums ===
List of studio albums, showing selected details, selected chart positions, and sales figures
Title	Details
If I May	Releases: May 17, 2023; Label: Jaywalk NewJoy, Wisdom Big Dog Music Ent.; Formats: CD, digital download, streaming; Track listing: 1. "Stay"; 2. "为你我可以"; 3. "黄昏的孩子"; 4. "是他们说的那个地方"; 5. "Gimme!Gimme!Gimme!" (feat. Gigi Yim)"; 6. "限定对白U&I"; 7. "雲端漫步"; 8. "坐标系"; 9. "捕捉边际的你"; 10. "灰色字宙色星球"; 11. "Sunset City"; 12. "Stay (Instrumental)"; 13. "为你我可以 (Instrumental)"; 14. "黄昏的孩子 (Instrumental)"; 15. "是他们说的那个地方 (Instrumental)"; 16. "Gimme!Gimme!Gimme!" (feat. Gigi Yim) (Instrumental)"; 17. "限定对白U&I (Instrumental)"; 18. "雲端漫步 (Instrumental)"; 19. "坐标系 (Instrumental)"; 20. "捕捉边际的你 (Instrumental)"; 21. "灰色字宙色星球 (Instrumental)"; 22. "Sunset City (Instrumental)"

=== Singles ===
Year	Title
2021	"R.O.T.Y"
2023	"Sunset City"
2023	"Stuck on You"

=== Soundtrack appearances ===
Year	Title	Notes
2022	"Only You in My Eyes" 我的眼里只有你	Special project for the classic OST of The Wind Blowing Pinellia
2022	"Homecoming" 似水流年	Promotional song for Memories Beyond Horizon

=== Other songs ===
Year	Title	Notes
2022	"Evening Dawn" 黃昏曉	Youth Reset Project 6

=== Production credits ===
Year	Artist	Song	Lyrics	Music
2021	Zhou Keyu	"R.O.T.Y"	Yes	Yes

== Filmography ==
=== Film ===
Year	Title		Role	Notes	Ref.
Year	English	Original	Role	Notes	Ref.
2021	Umbrella Man	撑伞人	Xiao Yu	Supporting Role	

=== Television series ===
Year	Title		Network	Role	Notes	Ref.
Year	English	Original	Network	Role	Notes	Ref.
2021	Remember My Boy	我曾记得那男孩	Mango TV, Tencent Video	Zhang Yang	Main role	
2023	Only For Love	以爱为营	Mango TV, Hunan TV	Yi Yang	Support role	
2024	A Moment but Forever	念无双	CCTV, iQIYI	Xia Qianlin	Support role	
2025	Always Home	树下有片红房子	Tencent Video	Song Cong	Main role	
2025	Sniper Butterfly	狙击蝴蝶	Tencent Video	Li Wu	Main role	
2026	Never-Ending Summer	炽夏	Mango TV	Lu Xixiao	Main role	
TBA	Sweetest Rebellion	一枕春华	iQIYI	Sheng Linzhi	Main role	
TBA	Shadows of Desire	金吾不禁	iQIYI	Zhang Hangjian	Main role	
TBA	Where Her Hemline Brushed	小城春色	Tencent Video	Zhou Zheng	Main role	

=== Television shows ===
Year	Title		Network	Role	Notes	Ref.
Year	English	Original	Network	Role	Notes	Ref.
2020	Happy Camp	快乐大本营	Hunan TV, Mango TV	Regular	11 episodes	
2021	Produce Camp 2021	创造营2021	Tencent Video	Contestant	Survival show that determined Into1 members Finished 10th	
2022	Memories Beyond Horizon	无限超越班	TVB Jade, Youku, ZJTV	Cast Member	Episodes 1-4, 9-11	
2024	The Truth		Mango TV	Regular	Season 2 (10 episodes), Season 3 (10 episodes), Season 4	

=== Hosting ===
Year	Title		Network	Notes
Year	English	Original	Network	Notes
2022	2022 King of Glory Co-creation Night 7th Anniversary Celebration	2022 王者榮耀共創之夜 7週年慶典	Sina Weibo	with Zhou Shen, Lai Meiyun, and Guo Jiayi (Gemini)

== Concerts ==
=== Concert tours ===
- Zhou Keyu First Solo Tour (2023)
