= Always Home =

- Chinese: 樹下有片紅房子
- Hanyu Pinyin: Shùxià yǒu piàn hóng fángzǐ
- Genre: Coming-of-age; School drama
- Based on: Shuxia you pian hong fangzi (树下有片红房子) by Xiao Ge (小格)
- Written by: Wang Yuan
- Directed by: Zhang Xiao'an
- Starring: Zhai Xiaowen; Zhou Keyu; Yang Xizi; He Qiu
- Opening theme: "Why Don't We Meet Sometime" (不如找天見面) by Zhai Xiaowen
- Ending theme: "Yesterday's Clear Sky" (昨日晴空) by Yang Xizi
- Composer: Zhang Xiao'an
- Country of origin: China
- Original language: Mandarin Chinese
- No. of episodes: 30

Production
- Producers: Liu Mingli, Long Hongtao, Zhang Bo
- Production locations: Fuzhou, Pingtan
- Running time: Approximately 45 minutes
- Production companies: Tencent Video; Cailin Culture Media

Original release
- Network: Tencent Video
- Release: February 15 – March 8, 2025

Always Home (Chinese: 樹下有片紅房子; pinyin: Shùxià yǒu piàn hóng fángzǐ) is a 2025 Chinese coming-of-age television drama starring Zhai Xiaowen, Zhou Keyu, Yang Xizi and He Qiu. It follows a group of friends from the same housing compound from high school to college as they navigate friendships, family roles, and pursue their dreams. It premiered on Tencent Video on February 15, 2025. The drama is adapted from a novel of the same name by Chinese writer Xiao Ge.

== Synopsis ==
In 2007, sixteen-year-old Chen Huan'er (Yang Xizi) moves with her mother from a small town to the large city of Tianhe. In her new housing compound, she meets classmates Jing Xichi (Zhai Xiaowen), an energetic athlete who slacks off in class, and Song Cong (Zhou Keyu), a quiet straight A student. Through high school, college, and beyond, Chen Huan'er and her friends navigate changing friendships, academics, unrequited love, family crises, distance from loved ones, and other growing pains. Although their lives take them in different directions, they continue to find home in one another.

== Cast ==
=== Main characters ===
Actor	Character	Voice	Description
Zhai Xiaowen	Jing Qichi	Himself	First male lead. A refreshing, sunny, and energetic teenager who loves soccer. His personality is humorous, mischievous, and affectionate, often displaying an optimistic attitude. Though he appears carefree, he is soft-hearted and thoughtful inside. He gives up his soccer dream due to injury and suffers a breakdown after his father's death in the line of duty, but recovers with Chen Huan'er's encouragement. After graduating from university, he works in Beijing and later returns to Chen Huan'er's city, successfully proposing when she completes her doctorate.
Zhou Keyu	Song Cong	Himself	Second male lead. A reserved and resilient top student who excels academically and is seen as a role model by his peers and a good student by teachers. Family changes have a profound impact on his growth. His mother's paralysis forces him to shoulder family responsibilities, attending school during the day and working at night, even secretly selling his beloved book collection to raise money for medical expenses. Despite life's challenges, he maintains his composure in front of friends and tries to maintain surface calm. Due to his mother's worsening condition, he transfers back to his hometown to continue his studies.
Yang Xizi	Chen Huan'er	Herself	Female lead. An optimistic, cheerful, and positive high school student who moves from her small hometown to the big city of Tianhe's hospital staff residential compound due to her mother's job transfer. There, she meets Jing Qichi and Song Cong, quickly integrating into the new environment and building deep friendships with them. She adapts with an optimistic attitude, experiences various changes, and once encouraged Jing Qichi by sharing her own illness experience. After graduating from university, she pursues graduate studies and eventually finds happiness with Jing Qichi.
He Qiu	Qi Qi	Herself	Second female lead. An elegant and graceful goddess on campus with a slender figure, light posture, and refined facial features with smooth, flowing lines. She grew up in the hospital staff residential compound, receiving a good education and cultural upbringing from a young age. She is emotionally sensitive, genuinely kind, and persistently determined. She provides warmth and help to Chen Huan'er when she transfers to the school, and the two become good friends. She develops romantic feelings for her classmate Song Cong and makes several attempts to approach him and express her feelings, but their relationship remains unclear due to misunderstandings, ultimately becoming a precious memory of spiritual resonance.

=== Supporting characters ===
Actor	Character	Description
Zhou Haoqi	Tian Chi	Classmate of Jing Qichi, Song Cong, and Chen Huan'er. Falls in love with Chen Huan'er at first sight, from helping her move boxes, to "chance encounters" in the cafeteria, to finding excuses to watch movies alone with her, expressing his deep feelings. However, his feelings come a step too late, and he fails to be with Chen Huan'er. He lives in the same residential compound as Qi Qi and Liao Xinyan, ultimately remaining on the periphery of the core circle.
Zhang Xuzhen	Li Tian	An academically excellent student who has long been under strict parental control. His father, as the hospital director, forcefully demands that he give up his English interests to study medicine, even scolding him after he wins first place in an English speech competition, demonstrating the conflict between family expectations and personal ideals. The "Chengli CP" formed with Chen Huan'er runs throughout the series, with the two going from being at odds to developing an emotional bond through family conflicts. Although he ultimately fails to realize his childhood dream of attending Cambridge University, he gradually accepts reality and finds meaning in life.
Xu Shixin	Huang Lu	Chen Huan'er's university roommate who shares in the fun and challenges of university life with her.
Sui Yuan	Du Man	Chen Huan'er's middle school classmate, outwardly aloof and reserved, calm and rational, and extremely strict with herself. She represents an independent woman, breaking traditional youth drama conventions with rationality and career ambition. Although she has a tacit understanding with Li Tian, she chooses to focus on academics rather than romance. From middle school on, she studies diligently, determined to succeed, and through persistent effort, ultimately realizes her life ideals.
Zhao Fanshu	Liao Xinyan	Class monitor with a very cheerful and straightforward personality. She has always been regarded as an imaginary enemy by Qi Qi, who mistakenly believes she likes Song Cong, but in fact she only uses Song Cong as a cover, as she really likes Jing Qichi.
Yang Ziyan	Qian Lina	Chen Huan'er's mother, displaying the gentleness and contradictions of a mother in a traditional family. She adopts an encouraging approach to raising her child, insisting that her daughter attend university within the province during college application season. Later diagnosed with a tumor, she cherishes family life more after successful surgery.
Hao Wenting	Hao Mei	Emergency room nurse and Song Cong's mother. Suffers lower body paralysis in an accident while trying to stop a patient's family from entering the emergency room. Her character is strong-willed and sensitive, showing both resilience as a core family member and psychological struggles after falling ill.
Chang Cheng	Song Hang	Song Cong's father, who insists on his child entering the international class rather than studying medicine, leading to ideological conflicts with Song Cong.
Rong Rong	Lin Yifan	Jing Qichi's mother, displaying the contradictions and growth of traditional parents in family education. She repeatedly faces embarrassment due to her son's consistently poor grades and suffers an emotional breakdown after her husband's sacrifice in a mountain fire rescue. Facing her son's academic transformation after being dropped from the sports school, she experiences a transition from anxiety to respecting his autonomy, ultimately supporting Jing Qichi in independently filling out his college entrance examination application.
Yan Peng	Jing Liqiang	Jing Qichi's father, whose busy work schedule leads to neglect of his son's academic management, causing family relationship tensions. A past fire incident has a profound psychological impact on the protagonist.
Wang Lei	Chen Lei	Chen Huan'er's father, a martial arts coach whose long-term focus on work leads to estrangement from his family. The series shows his emotional transition from workaholic to returning to family through his decision to step back from the frontlines and take belated wedding photos.
Yang Haoming	Zhou Ye	Medical student who forms a roommate relationship with Jing Qichi, with his impulsive and straightforward personality running throughout the series.
Hei Ze	Jiang Sen	Core leader of the Huandao AI Lab team who exceptionally recruits and personally trains Jing Qichi, helping him transform doubts into practical results through project guidance, forming a special mentor-protégé relationship.
Chen Jieyi	Qiu Li	Chen Huan'er's classmate and roommate, an ordinary student who studies hard but sees slow grade improvement, who along with Huang Lu takes care of their drunk roommate and participates in student union welcome gatherings.
Zhang Haoxin	Du Wei	Third-year senior who actively invites Jing Qichi and Zhou Ye to join the computer group. She has romantic feelings for Jing Qichi and creates opportunities to be alone with him and confesses multiple times, but is always rejected.
Chen Xixi	Lin Shuang	Founder of Xiaoying Technology Company who targets and invites Martin from Nuoxin Company to join the team through a headhunting firm.
Tang Geyuan	Yan Mu	Character who participates in plot development.

== Soundtrack ==
The soundtrack was released on QQ Music in February 2025.

Song Title	Lyricist	Composer	Performer	Notes
"Why Don't We Meet Sometime"（不如找天見面）	Zhang Xiao'an	Zhang Xiao'an	Zhai Xiaowen	Theme song
"Fireworks"（煙花）	Zhang Xiao'an	Zhang Xiao'an	Zhou Keyu	Insert song
"Love Ya Love"（愛呀愛）	Zhang Xiao'an	Zhang Xiao'an	Zhang Xiao'an	Insert song
"The Melody in Your Name"（你名字裡的旋律）	Zhang Xiao'an	Zhang Xiao'an	Lara Liang Xinyi	Insert song
"To the Girls"（致女孩）	Zhang Xiao'an	Zhang Xiao'an	Su Miaoling	Insert song
"Yesterday's Clear Sky"（昨日晴空）	Zhang Xiao'an, Chen Yuyan	Wang Ke	Yang Xizi	Ending theme
"Obviously"（明明）	Chen Yuyan	Wang Ke	Lai Meiyun	Insert song

== Production ==
=== Filming ===
Always Home was produced by Tencent Video and Cailin Wenhua. The drama series began filming in January 2024 and was shot entirely in Fujian province, including at the affiliated high school of Fujian Normal University, according to a Fuzhou city press release. On April 22, the drama finished filming.

=== Production team ===
- Production companies: Shanghai Tencent Penguin Pictures Cultural Communication Co., Ltd., Xiamen Caibin Culture Media Co., Ltd.
- Production company: Xiamen Caibin Culture Media Co., Ltd.
- Co-production: Fuzhou Xingluo Culture Media Co., Ltd.

== Promotion and broadcast ==
On April 22, 2024, the series released a wrap-up special; on June 24, it released its first trailer; on the same day, it released youth celebration posters; on October 18, it was selected for Tencent's 2025 major drama lineup.

On February 12, 2025, the series released blooming youth posters; on the same day, it released a love cycle trailer and announced the OST lineup; on February 14, it released Valentine's Day promotional materials; on February 15, it officially premiered on Tencent Video and released a youth diary trailer and posters; on February 16, the OST was released; on February 19, it released themed promotional materials about old friends; on February 21, it released a viewing calendar; on March 7, it released a ten-year special feature about the red house; on March 8, the series concluded.

== Reception ==
=== Audience ratings ===
Website	Rating	Number of raters	As of
Tencent Video	9.4	807,000	April 12, 2025
Douban	7.9	42,910	April 12, 2025

=== Critical reception ===
The Paper commented: "Always Home waves the flag of nostalgia, with the hospital staff residential compound from the 1990s showing carefully designed aging effects on every peeling wall, bringing people back to their childhood and teenage years, with young actors delivering natural and endearing performances and a relaxed, authentic plot. This series contains much genuine emotion in its nostalgic youth setting, and with the production team 'recruiting' millennium-era cassette tapes and pagers as extras, it indeed manages to squeeze out another wave of generational tears. This is what it means to achieve much with little—a modest production that has won the love and support of many viewers. The series is representative of the youth campus genre, a track that 'produces talent every year' and belongs to the evergreen competitive landscape. The series responds to Chinese audiences' unchanging nostalgic sentiment—lost youth and childhood always have a filter of time that makes them constantly fresh and unforgettable, especially poignant when looking back from the perspective of working adults sandwiched between caring for the elderly and raising children in the 2020s."
