= Qin Junjie =

Chinese actor

- Born: Huli District, Xiamen, Fujian
- Education: Central Academy of Drama
- Occupation: Actor
- Years active: 2006–present
- Agent: Qin Junjie Studio

Chinese name
- Simplified Chinese: 秦俊杰
- Traditional Chinese: 秦俊傑
Transcriptions
Standard Mandarin
- Hanyu Pinyin: Qín Jùnjié

Qin Junjie (Chinese: 秦俊杰) is a Chinese actor. He made his debut in the 2006 film Curse of the Golden Flower. He is best known for his starring roles in the TV series Noble Aspirations (2016), Legend of Dragon Pearl (2017), Peace in Palace, Peace in Chang’an, and Listening Snow Tower (2019).

== Career ==
At the age of 15, Qin debuted as an actor in Zhang Yimou's Curse of the Golden Flower, playing the young Prince Yuan Cheng. He then starred in the Chinese adaptation of Japanese anime The Prince of Tennis, and gained increased popularity. Qin then took a break from acting as he concentrated on studies, appearing less frequently in projects.

Qin gained renewed recognition with his supporting roles in television dramas The Legend of Qin (2015), Noble Aspirations (2016) and The Glory of Tang Dynasty (2017).

In 2019, Qin starred as the male lead in the spy drama Spy Hunter, which is produced by the team behind the 2015 hit drama The Disguiser. The same year he starred in the wuxia romance drama Listening Snow Tower.

=== Upcoming projects ===
In February 2017, filming began for the historical drama Peace in Palace, Peace in Chang'an, in which Qin portrayed the Tang emperor Li Shimin. The series has been in post-production since July 2017.

On September 22, 2020, Qin began filming historical drama The Legend of Yaoxiang. Filming was wrapped on January 9, 2021.

== Filmography ==
=== Film ===
Year	English title	Chinese title	Role	Notes/Ref.
2006	Curse of the Golden Flower	满城尽带黄金甲	Yuan Cheng	
2008	The Winds of September	摊开你的地图	Zheng Weiwei	
2012	Painted Skin: The Resurrection	画皮2	young Huo Xin	
2014	Rise of the Legend	黄飞鸿之英雄有梦	Liang Kuan	
TBA		醉+拍档	Qiao Duoduo	

=== Television series ===
Year	English title	Chinese title	Role	Notes/Ref.
2008	The Prince of Tennis	网球王子	Long Ma	
2009	The Prince of Tennis 2	网球王子2	Long Ma	
2012	Beautiful Day	风和日丽	Yin Nanfang	
2013	Royalty in Blood	异镇	Long Jiu	
2014	Swords of Legends	古剑奇谭	Crown Prince Chang Qin	Special appearance
2015	The Legend of Qin	秦时明月	Xiang Shaoyu	
2016	Singing All Along	秀丽江山之长歌行	Deng Feng	Special appearance
2016	Noble Aspirations	青云志	Zeng Shushu	
2016	Noble Aspirations 2	青云志2	Zeng Shushu	
2017	The Glory of Tang Dynasty	大唐荣耀	Li Tan	
2017	Legend of Dragon Pearl	龙珠传奇之无间道	Kangxi	
2018	Summer's Desire	泡沫之夏	Ou Chen	
2018	Dagger Mastery	神风刀	Shui Ge	
2019	Spy Hunter	天衣无缝	Zi Liping	
2019	Listening Snow Tower	听雪楼	Xiao Yiqing	
2019	Never Say Never	善始善终	Fang Han	
2021	Faiths Makes Great	理想照耀中国	Chen Yian	
2021	Heng Shan Hospital	衡山医院	Ma Tianming	
2022	Babel	通天塔	Lu Xiao	
2022	Discovery of Romance	恋爱的夏天	Xu Zehao	
2022	Side Story of Fox Volant	飞狐外传	Hu Fei	
2022	Floating Life Fantasy World	浮生之异想世界	Heng	Micro series
2024	Heroes	天行健	Men Sandao	
TBA	Peace in Palace, Peace in Chang'an	天下长安	Li Shimin	
TBA	The Indomitable Mission	信仰	Zhao Yunfei	
TBA	The Legend of Yaoxiang	瑶象传奇	Li Chun	

== Discography ==
Year	English title	Chinese title	Album	Notes
2019	"Jin Se"	錦瑟	Listening Snow Tower OST	with Yuan Bingyan

== Awards and nominations ==
Year	Award	Category	Nominated work	Result	Ref.
2016	China Original Literature Billboard Awards	Most Promising Actor	Noble Aspirations	Won	
2016	10th Tencent Video Star Awards	Most Promising Artist	—N/a	Won	
2016	Sina Best Taste Award	New Artist Award	—N/a	Won	
2017	iFeng Fashion Choice Award	Fashion Popularity Award	—N/a	Won	
2019	OK! The Style Awards	Popular Actor	—N/a	Won	
2019	6th The Actors of China Award Ceremony	Best Actor (Web series)	Listening Snow Tower	Nominated	
2019	11th China TV Drama Awards	Most Promising Actor	—N/a	Won	
