= Legend of Dragon Pearl =

- Promotional poster
- Also known as: Long Zhu
- Genre: Historical fiction Romance comedy
- Written by: Li Yaling
- Directed by: Zhu Shaojie; Zhou Yuanzhou
- Starring: Yang Zi; Qin Junjie; Shu Chang; Mao Zijun
- Opening theme: Bright Pearl by Isabelle Huang
- Ending theme: The World in between your Eyebrows by Chang Shilei
- Country of origin: China
- Original language: Mandarin
- No. of episodes: 90

Production
- Running time: 30 mins
- Production companies: Tianyi Media; Yueshi Media

Original release
- Network: Anhui TV, Beijing TV
- Release: 8 May – 16 August 2017

The Legend of Dragon Pearl (Chinese: 龙珠传奇) is a 2017 Chinese television series starring Yang Zi, Qin Junjie, Shu Chang and Mao Zijun. The series premiered on Anhui TV and Beijing TV on 8 May 2017. The show aired two episodes per day from Monday to Wednesday at 22:00 (CST). VIP members of Youku could view 12 episodes per week.

== Synopsis ==
The story tells the tale of the Kangxi Emperor of the Qing dynasty and Li Yihuan, the last princess of the Southern Ming dynasty. After the Qing conquest of the Ming, Li Yihuan and the rest of the descendants of the Ming dynasty retreat to the Dragon Pearl Canyon. There, they train under the guidance of the elders, learning various skills, hoping to restore the glory of their country one day. Li Yihuan was instructed by her teacher to get close to the Kangxi Emperor to seek an opportunity for revenge.

Li Yihuan and Kangxi met on a street in Beijing and became friends, unaware of each other's identity. The princess wasn't aware of her true identity. They crossed each other's path again and faced several life-threatening events together, during which the princess risked her life to save the emperor.

After spending time together, they fell in love in spite of the initial prejudice of the last princess against the Qing emperor. But being on opposite sides, their love story is rendered impossible.

Kangxi, whose face is not known outside of the Capitol, travels the country to determine the conditions his people endure. He maintains the fiction that he is a 5th-level Imperial official named Long San. Much of the story is centered around his interaction with a corrupt 2nd-level official, Liu Dezhao. Recent droughts and disasters have led to difficulty, and Kangxi learns that Liu has taken advantage of the instability to gather power, while at the same time diverting the silver and grain which the Empire has sent as aid. Kangxi is angered, but it is impossible for him to take direct action without making his true identity known. Instead, Yihuan keeps a record for him of what he sees, for later action. Dezhao discovers that "Long San" has "forged" a letter of authority, and that reports are being made to the Emperor.

When Kangxi and his retinue return to the Capitol, his eyes have been opened to the suffering of the people under corrupt officials, and he learns that men who he had respected and honored among the Capitol officialdom and nobility are also corrupt. He is able to take action and does so through a far-reaching purge.

Liu Dezhao is summoned to the Capitol, but following custom and law, is unable to raise his eyes to see the face of the Emperor. He claims that the reports from "Long San" are false, then recognizes—and denounces—members of the group which had traveled with Kangxi. Once ordered to raise his eyes to meet those of the Emperor, he is shocked to realize that "Long San" is actually Kangxi, and that his corruption is known.

== Cast ==
=== Main ===
- Yang Zi as Li Yihuan

The last princess of the Ming dynasty. Having been switched at birth, she is raised as the daughter of Li Dingguo without knowledge of her true identity. Hoping to right the wrongs, she was betrothed to Zhu Cixuan so that she becomes queen by way of marriage. Growing up, she is surrounded by mentors and friends who have dedicated their entire lives towards bringing down the Qing dynasty. Due to health reasons, she is exempted from rigorous training and courses throughout her childhood, yet maintained her cheerful and cheeky demeanour .
When she sneaks out of her home she meets the Kangxi Emperor who is incognito as an ordinary man, and befriends him. Despite being aligned with the anti-Qing faction, Yihuan only wishes to live a carefree and simple life. As she spends more time with Kangxi, she realizes that he is a just ruler and gradually gives up on her plans for revenge.

- Qin Junjie as Kangxi Emperor

The young emperor of Qing dynasty. Due to his young age and inexperience, he has yet to gather enough influence to have any say on matters involving the nation but he is clever, malleable and determined to bide his time in his plan to defeat Oboi. He disguises himself as an imperial guard named Longsan to infiltrate among his people and understand their sentiments. On a day when he was disguised as Longsan, he meets Yihuan when she was dressed as a boy and they quickly become friends and then sworn brothers.

- Shu Chang as Xue Qingcheng / Shu Wanxin

Yihuan's close childhood friend and senior. She is beautiful, reserved and very capable at what she does. She is in love with Zhu Cixuan, yet he only has eyes for Yihuan. In order to infiltrate the palace, she takes on the identity of Shu Wanxin, the daughter of a Qing dynasty official, and marries Kangxi as one of his concubines.

- Mao Zijun as Zhu Cixuan / Li Jianqing

The crown prince of the Ming dynasty. Switched at birth, he is actually Li Dingguo's son. He is intelligent, level-headed and exemplary as the figurehead who has been tasked with the burden of reviving a nation at a very young age. Given his arranged marriage with Yihuan, he has always seen her as his wife and partner but is devastated when he realizes Yihuan loves Kangxi.

=== Supporting ===
==== People at Dragon Pearl Canyon ====
- He Zhonghua as Li Dingguo

The former great general of Ming. A patriotic and loyal man who is willing to sacrifice anything for his country.

- Han Chengyu as Ye Mosheng

Yihuan's childhood friend who is secretly in love with her and becomes rash and impulsive in all things concerning her. His over attentiveness towards her causes issues between himself and Zhu Cixuan.

- Sun Wei as Fan Qianying

Yihuan's childhood friend. Her face was disfigured by a bear since young, causing her to be insecure about her looks. She falls in love with Wu Yingqi while carrying out her mission.

- Zhang Dan as Chen Shengnan
- Canti Lau as Fan Li
- Xiu Qing as Ye Mingzhang
- Tong Tong as Tang Yishou
- Jiang Hong as Snow-clothed Warrior

==== People of the Qing dynasty ====
===== People in the palace =====
- Siqin Gaowa as Empress Dowager Xiaozhuang
- Zhang Weina as Empress Xiaochengren
- He Zhonghua as Li Defu

Kangxi's personal eunuch, who was poisoned by Oboi and forced to spy for him. He is also the twin brother of Li Dingguo. Despite being reluctant to help his brother with overthrowing the Qing dynasty, he secretly looks out for Yihuan and Zhu Cixuan in the palace.

- Lu Xingyu as Songgotu
- Xiao Rongsheng as Oboi

===== Wu Sangui's household =====
- Liu Liwei as Wu Sangui
- Liu Xueyi as Wu Yingqi

The second son of Wu Sangui. A kind-hearted and gentle man, who falls for Fan Qianying despite the scar on her face.

- Wang Yichan as Lady Qin, Wu Sangui's wife.
- Li Zan as Shi Qinghong

Wu Yingqi's personal bodyguard. He poisoned and killed Shu Jian to prevent him from divulging important information to Kangxi.

===== People in Shanxi Province =====
- Xie Ning as Liu Dezhao

An evil and conniving official who uses unscrupulous methods to steal the villager's property and grains.

- Dai Zixiang as Meng Xianghe

Liu Dezhao's personal bodyguard who was tasked to protect him for 10 years. He is also Shu Wanxin's lover.

- Cheng Cheng as Qiu Gui

Liu Dezhao's brother-in-law, and his fellow accomplice.

- Guo Ruixi as Lady Qiu, Liu Dezhao's wife.
- Wang Yao as Shu Jian

An upright and loyal official who was killed when he tried to report Wu Sangui and Liu Dezhao's evil deeds to Kangxi. He is also Shu Wanxin's father.

==== People of the Ming dynasty ====
- Huang Haibing as Yongli Emperor
- Wen Chunxiao as Empress Wang
- Huang Juan as Lady Jin, Li Dingguo's wife.
- Ren Jialun as Li Sixing

Li Dingguo's son, who went missing after witnessing his father kill his mother and sister.

- Zhou Tao as Sun Fu

Li Sixing's formal lieutenant. After Li Sixing's departure, he submits to the Qing dynasty and becomes a magistrate.

== Soundtrack ==
The Legend of Dragon Pearl - Original Television Soundtrack (龙珠传奇电视剧原声音乐大碟)
No.	Title	Music	Length
1.	"Bright Pearl (明珠)"	Isabelle Huang	3:48
2.	"A Lifetime of Hurt (半世真一世伤)"	Jason Hong
3.	"Si Wu Lai (思无来)"	Liu Zhijia
4.	"Beautiful Snow (雪倾城)"	Mao Zeshao
5.	"Yi Jian Mei (一剪梅)"	Mao Zeshao	4:00
6.	"The World in between your Eyebrows (天地眉间)"	Chang Shilei	3:49

== Ratings ==
- Highest ratings are marked in red, lowest ratings are marked in blue

Beijing TV CSM52 ratings
Broadcast date	Episode	Ratings (%)	Audience share
2017.5.8	1-2	0.401	2.702
2017.5.9	3-4	0.344	2.106
2017.5.10	5-6	0.369	2.358
2017.5.16	7-9	0.173	1.374
2017.5.17	10-12	0.241	1.758
2017.5.22	13-14	0.259	1.520
2017.5.23	15-16	0.222	1.278
2017.5.24	17-18	0.337	1.86
2017.5.30	19-21	0.18	0.994
2017.5.31	22-24	0.27	1.475
2017.6.5	25-26	0.18	1.01
2017.6.6	27-28	0.119	0.698
2017.6.7	29-30	0.265	1.506
2017.6.12	31-32	0.250	1.717
2017.6.13	33-34	0.147	0.852
2017.6.14	35-36	0.177	1.139
2017.6.19	37-38	0.185	1.393
2017.6.20	39-40	0.178	1.228
2017.6.21	40-42	0.182	1.249
2017.6.26	43-44	0.197	1.321
2017.6.27	45-46	0.234	1.396
2017.6.28	47-48	0.217	1.323
2017.7.3	49-50	0.11	0.652
2017.7.4	51-52	0.127	0.786
2017.7.5	53-54	0.109	0.711
2017.7.10	55-56	0.349	1.871
2017.7.11	57-58	0.113	0.631
2017.7.12	59-60	0.409	2.318
2017.7.17	61-62	0.127	0.692
2017.7.18	63-64	0.128	0.647
2017.7.19	65-66	0.249	1.465
2017.7.24	67-68	0.342	1.782
2017.7.25	69-70	0.301	1.585
2017.7.26	71-72	0.126	0.693
2017.7.31	73-74	0.152	0.901
2017.8.1	75-76	0.072	0.741
2017.8.2	77-78	0.085	0.735
2017.8.7	79-80	0.456	2.886
2017.8.8	81-82	0.239	1.408
2017.8.9	83-84	0.272	1.619
2017.8.14	85-86	0.236	1.475
2017.8.15	87-88	0.225	1.253
2017.8.16	89-90	0.258	1.471
