= Pandora's Box (Chinese TV series) =

China TV series

- 天目危机
- Genre: Action; Science; Investigators
- Starring: Ray Zhang Rui; He Dujuan; Michael Miu; Joseph Chang; Liu Xueyi; Yasuaki Kurata
- Country of origin: China
- Original language: Chinese
- No. of episodes: 12

Production
- Producer: Wong Ching-po
- Production locations: Hong Kong, China, China

Original release
- Network: Mango TV
- Release: 25 August 2021

Pandora's Box (Chinese: 天目危机) is a 2021 mystery drama. It was filmed in 2019. Initially to be aired on August 18, 2021, the airing was postponed to August 25, 2021, on Mango TV every Wednesday and Thursday.

== Synopsis ==
Physics genius Li Tian (Ray Zhang Rui) is focused on his investigation of a special type of energy. However, his mother Mei Xue Yan, a famous musician, gets embroiled in a mysterious car accident in Japan. Li Tian heads to Japan alone, but he never expected to fall into an intricate trap set up by a crime organisation. The man behind the scene manipulate Li Tian and uses advanced technology to commit a series of crimes. In Japan, Li Tian meets the bubbly Zhang Ni (He Dujuan), as well as the investigation officer responsible for the case - Yamazaki Dachang (Michael Miu). The three of them form a special investigation team and traces the incident back to a mysterious band twenty years ago. They also found Fu Bu Jie (Joseph Chang), a reporter who has been investigating the band for many years. A huge conspiracy which links back to a dark secret involving Li Tian's parents awaits them.

== Cast ==
=== Main cast ===
Cast	Role	Description
Ray Zhang Rui	Li Tian (李天)	A Physics genius Goes to Japan to investigate his mother's mysterious car accident.
He Dujuan	Zhang Ni (张妮)	
Michael Miu	Yamazaki Dachang (山崎)	Japanese police He is the investigating officer responsible for the case.
Joseph Chang	Fu Bu Jie (服部介)	A reporter who has been investigating the mysterious band for many years.
Liu Xueyi	Li Xiufu (李秀夫)	A missing rock band member.
Yasuaki Kurata	Hei Muhong (Not yet known)	
Mimi Kung	Mei Xueyan 梅雪燕	

== Production ==
Wong Ching-po, the director, took 2.5 years to write the script of the television film. It took the production crew five months to complete the principal photography for the 12 episodes.

== Reception ==
An advance screening of the first two episodes was held on June 9, 2019, at the China Art Museum as part of the 25th Shanghai Television Festival. The audience reacted favourably throughout the screening.
