= In Blossom =

2024 Chinese television series

- Official poster
- Genre: Historical; Romance; Thriller; Mystery
- Written by: Yu Hailin; Zhong Jing
- Directed by: Zhong Qing
- Starring: Ju Jingyi; Liu Xueyi; Li Geyang; Wu Jiayi
- Opening theme: "Door" (门) by Zhou Shen
- Ending theme: "The Close Paradise" (近在咫尺的天涯) by Hu Xia
- Country of origin: China
- Original language: Mandarin
- No. of seasons: 1
- No. of episodes: 32

Production
- Executive producers: Zhou Shuaibo; Zong Yi; Zhou Ji; Xie Ying; Zhao Jinwen; Ren Songyun
- Producers: Rui Ye; Zhou Yiyang
- Cinematography: Xiangshan Global Studios
- Running time: 45 minutes
- Production companies: Youku; Shengxi China Television; Zhudi Pictures

Original release
- Release: March 15 – April 1, 2024

In Blossom (Chinese: 花间令; pinyin: Huā Jiān Lìng) is a 2024 Chinese television series directed by Zhong Qing. It starred Ju Jingyi, Liu Xueyi, Li Geyang and Wu Jiayi in the leading roles. The series aired on Youku iQIYI with 32 episodes on March 15, 2024.

On March 17, 2024, the popularity exceeded 10,000 heat index, marking the fastest time for a series to reach 10,000 on Youku in 2024. The record was later broken by The Double (2024).

== Synopsis ==
Yang Caiwei, a coroner in Heyang city reunites with her childhood sweetheart and fiancé Pan Yue after 10 years. Shangguan Zhi is the younger sister of Pan Yue's best friend Shangguan Lan. Due to her obsession with Pan Yue, she kidnaps Yang Caiwei and changes her face in order to replace her on the day of the wedding. However, after the wedding she is killed by a mysterious figure and the suspected culprit was none other than Pan Yue. Yang Caiwei who now has Shangguan Zhi's face decides to assume her identity and becomes determined to expose Pan Yue's true colors.

== Cast and characters ==
=== Main ===
- Ju Jingyi as Shangguan Zhi / Yang Caiwei (after face change)
  - Zheng Hehuizi as Yang Caiwei (before face change)

Yang Caiwei: The daughter of former Minister of Justice Yang Ji'an. She was childhood sweethearts with Pan Yue when she was a child, and was granted marriage by the emperor. After her father was framed and exiled, a group of assassins' killed her parents. Later she lived on the streets of Heyang, where she was taken in by a coroner named Jiang Wu. On the day of her wedding with Pan Yue, she was kidnapped by Shangguan Zhi and had her face changed. After Shangguan Zhi was killed, she took on Shangguan Zhi's identity and wanted to find out the truth behind the murder.
Shangguan Zhi: Younger sister of Shangguan Lan who followed Pan Yue since she was a child. Shangguan Zhi was obsessed with Pan Yue and on the day of Pan Yue's wedding to Yang Caiwei, she kidnapped Yang Caiwei and changed her face in order to replace her. After the wedding she was killed by a mysterious figure.

- Liu Xueyi as Pan Yue

The illegitimate and eldest son of current Minister of Justice Pan Jin. He was first the imperial censor and then the magistrate of Heyang County. When he was a child, he and Yang Caiwei were childhood sweethearts and were granted marriage by the emperor.

- Li Geyang as Zhuo Lanjiang

Young master of Silver Rain Terrace and the only son of Zhuo Shanju. He was once rescued from a mass grave by Yang Caiwei. After that both of them became best friends.

- Wu Jiayi as Bai Xiaosheng

A ghost market vendor and Yang Caiwei's close friend.

=== Supporting ===
==== Heyang City ====
County Yamen

- Xiao Songyuan as Old Clerk Chen
- Han Qiuchi as Chen San
- Fan Jinlun as Constable Liu
- Wang Jingxi as Li Pang'er

Four Great Clans

Silver Rain Terrace

- Hei Zi as Zhuo Shanju

Former leader of Silver Rain Terrace and Zhuo Lanjiang's father

- Sun Zhenglin as Sun Zhen
- Hu Kun as A Fu
- Li Jing as Zhao Qian

Hundred Flowers Court

- Xu Baihui as Qing Di, leader of Hundred Flowers Court
- Liu Qinshan as Yun'er, Qing Di's subordinate
- Ren Wanjing as Yun Chang, 8th victim of Resurrection of Heavenly Master Case and former dancer of Hundred Flowers Court

Relief Hall

- Zhao Longhao as Gu Yong, head of Relief Hall
- Fan Zhonghua as Gu Shun, Gu Yong's substitute

Life & Death House

- Shi Haozheng as Cai Sheng, leader of Life & Death House

Lantern Festival Case

- Chen Yaxi as Gu Shan, Gu Yong's daughter
- Liu Yu Lufei as Shuang Shuang, Gu Shan's adopted younger sister
- Xu Yiwen as Madame Gu, Gu Yong's wife
- Li Heyan (李贺研) as Jin Liulang

Ghost Fire Case

- Xu Ruihao as Shen Ci / Shen Yan
  - Feng Jiazhi as young Shen Ci
- Wei Yu as Director Chen, director of Xin Zheng Academy and Chen Fu's father
- Xu Naiyu as Chen Fu
- Dou Xi as Zhou Ge
- Zhao Zhengyu as Liu Shi
- Lv Lin as Miao Zhuang

Resurrection of Heavenly Master Case

- Song Hanyu as Xue Jianli, leader of Luoyun Sect
- Liu Jinyan as Lu Aige, Xue Jianli's disciple

Others

- Zhong Weihua as Old Jiang, retired coroner and Yang Caiwei's master
- Zhang Haifeng as previous Magistrate of Heyang City
- Li Jun as Yang Ji'an

Yang Caiwei's father and former minister of Justice who was framed and exiled after returning capital to investigate rebel forces. Later, he and his wife were killed.

==== Capital ====
- Tan Limin as Empress
- Wang Keru as Liu Qing, Princess Changle
- Yi Yongming as Jia Quan, Grand Commandant
- Mei Lingzhen as Liu Yuan, Liu Qing's older sister and Jia Quan's wife
- Ma Ruize as Sun Ximing, officer of Ministry of Rites
- Bai Wei as Zuo Jingfei, master of Shiluo Hall
- Hua Wen as Sima Xuan, daughter of the Ministry of Personnel and Shangguan Zhi's rival
- Ya Wen as Mother Wan, head of courtesean house

==== Pan Mansion ====
- Qi Peixin as A Ze, Pan Yue's guard
- Li Peiming as Pan Jin

Minister of Justice. Pan Yue and Pan Hui's father

- Luo Shengdeng as Pan Hui

Legitimate second son of Minister Pan and Pan Yue's younger brother

==== Shangguan Mansion ====
- Zhang Rui as Shangguan Lan

Shangguan Zhi's elder brother and the richest man in the capital

- Ding Jie as Ling'er, Shangguan Zhi's attendant

== Production ==
Filming of the drama began in Xiangshan Global Studios on April 20, 2023 and the whole drama shooting was completed on July of the same year.

== Soundtrack ==
No.	English title	Chinese title	Artist	Lyrics	Composer	Notes
1.	"Door"	门	Zhou Shen	Zhang Jingyi	Liu Xuandou	Theme song / Ending theme song
2.	"The Close Paradise"	近在咫尺的天涯	Hu Xia	Zhang Jingyi	Liu Xuandou	Opening theme song
3.	"Flower Language"	花间语	Zhang Zining	Shi Yi	Liu Jia	
4.	"Heavy Frost"	沉霜	Li Xinyi	Yang Yuxin	Liu Xuandou	
5.	"Peach Blossom Recital"	桃花吟	Lai Meiyun	Zhang Huaqi	Ma Yuan	
6.	"A Thousand Calamity"	千劫	Yu Yi	Xu Jie	Peter Pan	
7.	"Farewell"	幽幽相送	Wang Jingwen	Shi Yi	Liu Jia	
8.	"Fortunately"	所幸	Xu Ziwei	Zhang Jingyi	Zhang Jingyi	
9.	"Love Like Dust"	爱如尘	Tan Jiexi	Shi Yi	Liu Jia	
10.	"Immeasurable"	无量	Zhu Zhihao	Yang Dongying	Ma Yuan	
