= Yuan Bingyan =

Chinese actress (born 1992)

- Born: 17 January 1992 (age 34); Shanghai, China
- Other names: Crystal Yuan, Yuan Yuan, Xiao Ming, Xiao Hong
- Education: Shanghai Theater Academy
- Occupation: Actress
- Years active: 2012–2023
- Agent: Nuoxin Media
- Notable work: "Old Nine Gates" as Er Yuehong; "Ever Night" as Mo Shanshan; "Listening Snow Tower" as Shu Jingrong; "Love and Redemption" as Chu Xuanji; "Good Wishes" or "My Sassy Princess" as Liu Ling

Chinese name
- Chinese: 袁冰妍
Transcriptions
Standard Mandarin
- Hanyu Pinyin: Yuán Bīngyán

Yuan Bingyan (Chinese: 袁冰妍; pinyin: Yuán Bīngyán; born in Shanghai on January 17, 1992) is a film and television actress in Mainland China who graduated from Shanghai Theater Academy. At the age of six, she began to learn Guzheng and then dance at the Shanghai Dance School. After being spotted by her dance teacher, she joined the Shanghai Oriental Friends Art Troupe. In 2020, she won widespread attention by playing the heroine Chu Xuanji in the fairy tale drama Love and Redemption. In April 2022, "Good Wishes" was broadcast on the IQIYI platform. After the broadcast, the popularity of "Good Wishes" reached 8247 on iQiyi. As of June, it is the fifth highest heat value in this station.

== Early experiences ==
In 2010, Yuan Bingyan was admitted to the performance department and choreography department of Shanghai Theater Academy with more than one score. In the end, she chose the performance department and became the only Shanghai girl in the class. During her college years, Yuan Bingyan won the second prize of Shanghai Theater Academy's comprehensive scholarship for the 2010-2011 academic year and the third prize of the Shanghai Theater Academy's comprehensive scholarship for the 2011-2012 academic year.

== Career ==
In 2012, Yuan Bingyan debuted with a supporting role in the wuxia drama Ip Man. She also played a role in the popular sitcom iPartment 4.

In 2013, Yuan Bingyan starred in the modern revolutionary drama "Cold Gunner", and played the role of Jiang Yushan, the prime minister's daughter in the drama; in August, she starred in the urban emotional drama "Departure to Happiness". In the same year, she also starred in the legendary drama "Legend of the Last Emperor", Tan Yuling, who plays in the play, is smart, capable, gentle and virtuous, and also Puyi's favorite concubine in his life. In addition, Yuan Bingyan also participated in the court drama "Legend of Qiantang" in Qing Dynasty.

In 2014, Yuan Bingyan starred in the modern urban emotional drama "Happy Season"; in March, she participated in the legendary costume drama "Sui and Tang Heroes 4"; on July 18, she starred in the urban idol drama "School Girl in White Clothes and Long Legs" started broadcasting, in which she played the role of Ruan Qingtian, a beautiful school girl in fluttering white clothes and full of mystery; likewise, Yuan Bingyan starred in the ancient costume myth drama "The New Bidai of the Bu Dai Monk" which was also broadcast in the same year .

In January 2015, "School Girl in White Clothes and Long Legs 2" starring Yuan Bingyan was broadcast. Later, she also starred in the final chapter of the series urban workplace drama "Du Lala's Promotion" "I am Du Lala". In June, starred in the legendary drama of the Republic of China "Tai Chi Master: Tai Chi Gate", in which she played the cute, gentle and sweet lady Chen Ruyu; in the same year, she also co-starred in Gu Long Wuxia with Hawick Lau, Yang Rong and others in the drama "Flying Knife Sees Flying Knife" and played the role of the soft and cute little sister Shui Wushang in the play. Although the fate is ill-fated, she has a chivalrous and warm heart. In September, she starred in the ancient costume fairy drama " The Legend of the Swordsman of Shushan Warfare " was broadcast; in November, she co-starred in the Republic of China adventure drama "Old Nine Gates", in which she played Er Yuehong's wife, A gentle, beautiful, kind-hearted but unlucky girl. The same year, she starred in the wuxia drama The Legend of Flying Daggers. In addition, Yuan Bingyan also starred in her debut film "The Uninvited Guest".

In February 2016, Yuan Bingyan, Liu Shishi, Huo Jianhua, Huang Xuan and others co-starred in the ancient costume palace inspirational drama "Female Doctor · Ming Concubine Biography" and the same year, she plays the role of Han Youniang, in the drama "Royal Highness", her character is kind and honest, with a great mind, very suitable for her.

In 2017, Yuan Bingyan starred in the passionate youth inspirational drama "Youth Shield", in which she played Shen Xiaotong, a little princess with a stubborn personality, soft outside and strong inside, and excellent in character and learning. In September, the starring movie "Back to the Ming Dynasty as a Prince: Yang Ling Biography Extra Chapter" started.

In 2018, Yuan starred in the fantasy historical drama Ever Night in which she played the "bookworm" Mo Shanshan, gentle and quiet Xian and Bingxue is smart, exquisite and delicate, and is the youngest talisman master in the world. Yuan's portrayal won acclaim from viewers, including fans of the original work and led to a rise in popularity for the actress.

In 2019, Yuan starred in the wuxia drama Listening Snow Tower alongside Qin Junjie, in which she played the stubborn and arrogant heroine Shu Jingrong. In May, she was invited to appear in the costume fantasy drama "Xuanmen Master", also Yuan Bingyan continued to co-star with many artists in the costume fantasy drama "Ever Night 2", and she still played the "bookworm" Mo Shanshan in the drama.

On August 6, 2020, Yuan Bingyan and Cheng Yi co-starred in the ancient costume fairy tale drama "Liu Li", Love and Redemption, in which she played the "Liu Li beauty" Chu Xuanji, who originally had a true temperament and was invincible Luo Hou Jidu, However, she was persecuted by others and became a beautiful and arrogant general who shocked the three worlds. She then went through ten lives and ten lives for thousands of years. In the same year, she also starred in the modern anti-drug drama " Thunder Order", and played the heroic and valiant policewoman Ge Dan in the play. On October 31, Yuan Bingyan also performed the cat stage trilogy with Wang Ou and Zhou Jieqiong at the Hunan Satellite TV Tmall Double 11 Opening Live Ceremony "Cat Forest", "Hide and Seek", "Persian Cat".

In February 2021, Yuan Bingyan starred in "The Ark of Hope" in the drama "Ideal Shines on China", a tribute to the founding of the Chinese Communist Party which was broadcast on Hunan Satellite TV. In the same year, she also performed the ancient song and dance show "Girl in Yuanxi" with Xu Yiyang and Bailu at the Lantern Festival Joy Party of Hunan Satellite TV.

In june 2021, played the camellia demon Hong Ning who has experienced the reincarnation of three generations in the play "Falling Flowers Meet You Again" is directed by Zhao Lijun and Ying Yinglu, starring Yuan Bingyan and Liu Xueyi. In July 21, the starring youth inspirational idol drama "Youth Forward" started broadcasting, and Yuan Bingyan played the role of an optimist and warm-hearted girl Tang Ke'er.

On April 16, 2022, Yuan Bingyan and Zheng Yecheng co-starred in the ancient costume love drama "Zhu Qing Hao" aired, in which she played the role of Liu Ling, the Princess of Changle, who looks unruly and domineering, but is actually kind, tough and infatuated.

In 2022, Yuan Bingyan and renowned actor Zhong Han Liang Wallace Chung, starred in the drama "Qing Cheng Yi Qing Huán", in english "The Emperor's Love" as Feng Qinghuan which will air in the third quarter of the year 2023 on the IQIYI platform.

== Controversy ==
On 13 June 2022, Yuan Bingyan's affiliated company, Chongqing Liyan Culture Media Co., Ltd., was fined 978,000 yuan for supposed tax evasion from 2019–2021. On July 3, Yuan Bingyan resigned from the position of legal representative, executive director and manager of the company.

On 4 July 2022, Yuan Bingyan's official studio released an official statement regarding the penalty imposed on Chongqing Li Yan Culture Media Co. Ltd. by STA China; this penalty was caused by the company's failure to fulfill its withholding tax obligations in a timely manner. The company has actively cooperated with China's STA in the investigation, and as of now, the company has paid the relevant taxes in full and within the deadline.

On September 16, 2023, the State Administration of Taxation announced:

In the early stage, the Chongqing Municipal Taxation Department discovered through analysis that Yuan Bingyan had tax-related risks. After prompting, urging rectification, and interviews and warnings, Yuan Bingyan still did not make complete rectifications. In addition, her affiliated enterprises were suspected of tax evasion, and she was punished in accordance with the law. Had a tax inspection. After investigation, Yuan Bingyan received part of the labor remuneration and failed to file a tax return in accordance with the law and underpaid personal income tax; she also used part of the personal consumption expenditures to be illegally disbursed in her controlled affiliated enterprises and underpaid personal income tax. Its affiliated companies have tax-related issues such as underpayment of value-added tax and corporate income tax for personal consumption expenditures in the enterprise in violation of regulations, and failure to withhold and pay personal income tax. During the tax inspection process, Yuan Bingyan actively cooperated with the tax authorities to provide truthful information and proactively reported tax-related illegal activities that the tax authorities had not yet grasped. Considering the above situation, the Seventh Inspection Bureau of the Chongqing Municipal Taxation Bureau based on the "Individual Income Tax Law of the People's Republic of China", the Enterprise Income Tax Law of the People's Republic of China, the Tax Collection Management Law of the People's Republic of China, the Administrative Punishment Law of the People's Republic of China and other relevant laws Regulations stipulate that Yuan Bingyan is required to pay back taxes, add late fees, and impose fines totaling 2.9738 million yuan; her affiliated companies are required to pay back taxes, add late fees, and impose fines totaling 1.3298 million yuan. The Seventh Inspection Bureau of the Chongqing Municipal Taxation Bureau has served Yuan Bingyan and her affiliated companies with a "Tax Treatment Decision" and a "Tax Administrative Penalty Decision" in accordance with the law. Yuan Bingyan and her affiliated companies have paid off tax fines and late fees in accordance with regulations.

After the report issued by the State Administration of Taxation, actress Yuan Bingyan was banned from some social media in China.

== Filmography ==
=== Film ===
Year	English title	Chinese title	Role	Notes
2016	The Guest	不速之客	Ah Xu	

=== Television series ===
Year	English title	Chinese title	Role	Notes
2013	Ip Man	叶问	Qiu Jianyun	
2014	iPartment 4	爱情公寓4	Qing Qing	
2014	Campus Belle and Beau	白衣校花与大长腿	Chen Qingtian	
2014	The Mystery of Emperor Qian Long	钱塘传奇	Xiang Jiji / Ji Jixiang	
2014		冷枪手	Jiang Yushan	
2014	The Legend of Bubai Monk	布袋和尚新传	Princess Jinlian	
2014	Heroes of Sui and Tang Dynasties	隋唐英雄4	Zhao Furong	
2015	Campus Belle and Beau 2	白衣校花与大长腿2	Chen Qingtian	
2015	Tour Between Two Lovers	向幸福出发	Fang Yu	
2015	The Last Emperor	末代皇帝传奇	Tan Yuling	
2015	Legend of Zu Mountain	蜀山战纪之剑侠传奇	Xiao Die	
2015	The Legend of Mi Yue: Zhan Guo Hong Yan	战国红颜之芈月传奇	Qing'er	
2016	The Imperial Doctress	女医·明妃传	Consort Liu	
2016	I am DuLaLa	我是杜拉拉	Zuo Xiaoqian	
2016	The Mystic Nine	老九门	Ya Tou	
2016	Happy Season	幸福的季节	Little Fairy	
2016	The Legend of Flying Daggers	飞刀又见飞刀	Shui Wushang	
2017	Tai-chi Master: The Ultimate Gateway	太极宗师之太极门	Chen Ruyu	
2018	The Taoism Grandmaster	玄门大师	Qiu Yi	
2018	Ever Night	将夜	Mo Shanshan	
2018	Royal Highness	回到明朝当王爷之杨凌传	Han Youniang	
2019	Listening Snow Tower	听雪楼	Shu Jingrong	
2020	Ever Night 2	将夜2	Mo Shanshan	
2020	Love and Redemption	琉璃	Chu Xuanji	
TBA	Thunder Chaser	雷霆令	Ge Dan	
TBA	Young Shield	少年盾	Shen Xiaotong	
TBA	Fly in Sky	青春二月当艳阳	Tang Ke'er	

== Discography ==
Year	English title	Chinese title	Album	Notes
2018	"Don't Forget"	莫望	Ever Night OST	Cover
2019	"Jin Se"	錦瑟	Listening Snow Tower OST	with Qin Junjie
2020	"Speak Out of the Same Heart"	同心而语	Love and Redemption OST	

== Awards ==
Year	Award	Category	Nominated work	Results	Ref.
2018	Tomorrow Land Fashion Awards	Most Promising Artist	—N/a	Won	
2020	Sina Style Awards	Quality Artist of the Year	—N/a	Won	
2020	5th Golden Blossom Internet Film and Television Awards	Actress of the Year	Love and Redemption, Ever Night 2	Top 3 (2nd place)	
2021	5th Golden Bud Network Film and Television Festival	Popular Actress of the Year	—N/a	Won	
