= Listening Snow Tower =

2019 Chinese TV series

- Promotional image
- 听雪楼
- Genre: Wuxia; Romance
- Based on: Ting Xue Lou by Cang Yue
- Written by: Han Peizhen
- Directed by: Yin Tao; Liu Guotong
- Starring: Qin Junjie; Yuan Bingyan
- Country of origin: China
- Original language: Mandarin
- No. of episodes: 56

Production
- Executive producers: Deng Xibin; Fang Fang; Zhong Junyan; Jiang Xinguang; Zhong Kaite
- Production locations: Hengdian World Studios; Shiguliao Film & Television City
- Running time: ≈45 minutes per episode
- Production companies: H&R Century Pictures

Original release
- Network: Tencent Video
- Release: May 6, 2019

Listening Snow Tower (听雪楼) is a 2019 Chinese wuxia romance television series based on the novel of the same Chinese title by Cang Yue. Starring Qin Junjie and Yuan Bingyan, it was first aired on Tencent Video on May 6, 2019.

== Synopsis ==
The story follows Xiao Yiqing, the master of the Listening Snow Tower and Shu Jingrong, daughter of the Blood Demon. In the jianghu, the Moon Sect strikes as a terrifying force and its poisonous influence grew under the command of Hua Lian. Bai Di, Xue Gu and "Blood Demon" Shu Xuewei, three powerful martial artist in the jianghu, join forces with the master of Listening Snow Tower to rid evil and bring back peace. Hua Lian, however, possesses a formidable weapon; allowing her to control the Blood Demon, who ends up killing himself to protect his beloved daughter: Shu Jingrong.

Orphaned with nowhere to go, young Shu Jingrong meets young master of Listening Snow Tower, Xiao Yiqing, whom she wholeheartedly remembers for his care and kindness towards her. Shu Jingrong then goes under the tutelage of Bai Di, earning her a new name Qingming and lives with him and his apprentices Qinglan and Qingyu in Bottomless Sand Valley.

Under the pressure of the looming Moon Sect and their treacherous plots, Shu Jingrong learns of her accursed fate of afflicting those she loves. She sets out to reawaken her father's weapon: the Blood Rose Sword, uniting with Xiao Yiqing to fight the wicked and put an end to the Moon Sect, bringing peace and balance to the jianghu.

== Cast ==
- Qin Junjie as Xiao Yiqing (萧忆情)
  - Son of Xiao Shishui and Xue Wen. Young master of the Snow tower, later become master of the tower. He suffers from the sickness of Jue Yin disease for his whole life. Lost his mom at a young age, but finds out later that she is alive. His dad was killed by Hua Lian. He wants to get revenge for his parents and everyone from the Sand Valley and all the other people involve in the Moon sect. He cares a lot about Shu Jingrong.
- Yuan Bingyan as Shu Jingrong (舒靖容) / Qing Ming (青冥)
  - Daughter of the Blood Demon. She lost her dad and mom because of the Moon Sect's leader, Hua Lian. She was Bai Di's junior disciple with her senior brothers, Qing Lan and Qing Yu. She cares a lot about Qing Lan. 3 years later, she joined the Snow Tower and worked with Xiao Yiqing to get revenge. Later the two fall in love and undergoing life and death.
- Han Chengyu as Qing Lan (青岚) / Jia Ruo (迦若)
  - He was Bai Di's senior disciple until the Moon sect attacked the Sand Valley and killed his master. He cares a lot about Shu Jingrong a.k.a. Qing Ming who normally calls her "Ming'er" (冥儿). He was almost killed but was saved by Ming He who is the young leader of the Moon Sect. He lost his memories after the incident of the Sand Valley and went with the name Jia Ruo. He became the High Priest of the Moon Sect.
- Angela Yuen as Ming He (明河)
  - Hua Lian and Ming Che's daughter, young leader of the Moon sect later becomes the leader of the sect. She saves Qing Lan after the attack at the Sand Valley, but he loses his memory b/c of Ming He. Ming He will do anything to keep the past in the past and make Jia Ruo hers. She loves him and will do anything to prevent him from remembering the past.
- Lin Yuan as Chi Xiaotai (池小苔)
  - She is a Snow tower Disciple, Chi Xue Gu's daughter, Nan Chu and Xiao Yiqing's junior sister. Secretly cares about Xiao YiQing without knowing that Gao Mengfei cares a lot about her. She caused a lot of trouble and made huge mistakes that no one knew until later on. She then later rebels with Gao Meng Fei b/c they are jealous of not having the spotlight shining on them.
- Zhao Dongze as Qing Yu (青羽)/ Gao Mengfei (高梦非)
  - He was Bai Di's second disciple until the Moon sect attacked the Sand Valley and killed his master. After that, he was ambushed, almost dying and changed his name to Gao Mengfei, and went separate with Shu Jingrong letting her wandering around Jianghu. He joined the Snow Tower. He falls for Chi Xiaotai. He rebels from the Snow Tower with Xiatai because he was jealous, attempting to take the throne of Snow Tower from Xiao Yiqing by killing him and desire power and glory.
- Zhang Tianyang as Nan Chu (南楚)
  - He is a Lord of the Snow tower, Chi Xue Gu's senior disciple, Xiao Yiqing and Chi Xiaotai's senior brother. He is always there for Xiao Yiqing. He was poisoned by Ming He's blood worms and later killed himself so he wouldn't harm Xiao Yiqing.
- Bai Shu as Huang Quan (黄泉)
  - Formerly a member of the Tian Li Assembly and later recruited by Xiao Yiqing. One of the guardians of the Snow Tower. Very Loyal. Falls in love with Zi Mo.
- Li Ruojia as Zi Mo (紫陌)
  - Recruited by Xiao Yiqing. One of the guardians of the Snow Tower. Very Loyal. Falls in love with Huang Quan.
- Guo Ji as Bi Luo (碧落)
  - Recruited by Xiao Yiqing. One of the guardians of the Snow Tower. Very Loyal. He is very good with the Zither and sword fighting. Cares about Hong Chen.
- Zhang Yang as Hong Chen (红尘)
  - Recruited by Xiao Yiqing. One of the guardians of the Snow Tower. Very Loyal. Cares about Bi Luo.
- Jessica Hsuan as Hua Lian (华莲)
- Fu Chengpeng as Xiao Shishui (萧逝水)
- Lu Fangsheng as Shu Xiewei (舒血薇)
- Yang Mingna as Xue Wen (雪纹)
- He Zhonghua as Bai Di (白帝)
- Li Ze as Gu Guang (孤光)
- Xi Xue as Yin Liuzhu (殷流硃)
- Zhao Ruihan as Bing Ling (冰凌)
- Fu Mengni as Xie Bingyu (谢冰玉) / Jiang Qianmei (江千媚)
- Zheng Xiaoning as Lei Zhentian (雷震天)
- Lu Peng as Lei Chuyun (雷楚云) / Qiu Huyu (秋护玉)
- Li Tai as Nangong WuGou (南宫无垢)
- Cao Yuchen as Qing Ya (青崖) / Hao Tian (昊天)
- Feng Lijun as Ren Feiyang (任飞扬)
- Huang Xinyao as Xue Qingming (薛青名)
- Huang Sihan as Xiao Ling
- Xiong Taijun as Su Wu (苏妩)
- Wang Jiusheng as Chi Xue Gu (池雪谷)
- Cheng Cheng as Qing Hui (清辉)
- Lu Xingyu as Mai Qiancheng (麦千成)
- Xie Ning as Xie Lizhou (谢梨洲)
- Wu Jingyi as Ye Fengsha (叶风砂)
- Dong Hui as Shi Mingyan (石明烟)

== Production ==
The drama began filming at Hengdian World Studios on January 28, 2018. It wrapped up filming on July 31, 2018.

== Reception ==
The drama received mainly negative reviews. It was criticized for ambiguous world setting, lack of clarity and coherence in plot, weak sub-plot, dull characters, and loopholes in plot. Additionally, it was criticized by novel fans for changing the entire plot of the novel. The heroine, Shu Jingrong, was originally a powerful and strong character in the novel but was changed to a weak character in the drama.

== Soundtrack ==
No.	Title	Lyrics	Music	Singers	Length
1.	"Snow (雪)" (Opening theme song)		Huang Bo
2.	"Tower of Happiness and Sadness (悲喜楼)"	Duan Sisi	Tan Xuan	Mickey He
3.	"Because of Wind (因风起)"	Liu Chang	Zeng Di	Juno Su
4.	"The Sad Zither (锦瑟)" (Wu You's theme song)	Liu Chang	Tan Xuan	Qin Junjie & Yuan Bingyan
5.	"No Feelings But Thoughts (无情有思)"	Liu Chang	Dan Yulong	Jin Runjie
6.	"Bloody Rose (血薇)"			Ye Xuanqing
7.	"Sunset Shadow (夕影)"	TNK	TNK	Xiao Yiqing

== International broadcast ==
- In Sri Lanka, the drama is available to stream on-demand via Iflix with subtitles and is billed under the name, "Snow Tower".
