= Love and Redemption =

2020 Chinese television series

- Also known as: Liuli; Liuli Meiren Sha
- Genre: Xianxia; Fantasy; Romance
- Based on: Liuli Meiren Sha by Shisi Lang
- Directed by: Yin Tao, Mai Guanzhi
- Starring: Cheng Yi; Yuan Bingyan; Zhang Yuxi; Liu Xueyi
- Opening theme: Liu Yuning <Liu Li>
- Ending theme: Yisa Yu & Ayanga <Qing Ren Zhou>
- Country of origin: China
- Original language: Mandarin
- No. of episodes: 59

Original release
- Network: Youku, Mango TV
- Release: August 6, 2020

Love and Redemption (Chinese: 琉璃; pinyin: Liu Li) is a 2020 Chinese television series based on the novel Liuli Meiren Sha (琉璃美人煞) by Shisi Lang (十四郎). It premiered on Youku and Mango TV on August 6, 2020. It stars actors Cheng Yi as Yu Sifeng and Yuan Bingyan as Chu Xuanji.

== Plot ==
A 1000 years ago, a bitter battle ensues between the Celestials and the Asuras in a struggle for power. The general of the Asura Clan, the Star of Mosha, is defeated by the God of War. He disappears, and his soul is sealed in a crystal lamp, which is then sent to the mortal realm to be hidden. However, the God of War too mysteriously vanishes along with him. A 1000 years later, both of their souls are sent to the mortal realm to undergo tribulations, and the demonic realm begins to prepare for the revival the Star of Mosha.

In the mortal realm, Chu Xuanji (Yuan Bingyan) is born to the Shaoyang Sect Leader without the power of perception through all six senses. She meets Yu Sifeng (Cheng Yi), a skilled disciple of the mysterious Lize Palace, during the Flower Banquet held at Shaoyang. Sifeng falls for her, despite being forbidden to do so. A turn of events leads to Xuanji being injured during the banquet, and she leaves to cultivate and train herself for four years. Sifeng returns to Lize Palace, where he is punished for breaking the sect rules with the Lover's Curse.

They encounter each other years later and set off for their own adventures, but their journey is riddled with mysterious encounters, and they start to realize that there is more to their past than they thought, as a millennium-old conspiracy slowly comes to light.

== Cast ==
=== Main cast ===
- Yuan Bingyan as Chu Xuanji (褚璇玑) / Goddess of War
  - The youngest daughter of the Shaoyang Sect leader, Chu Lei who is actually the reincarnation of the Goddess of War. Born as Xuanji, she has none of her six senses which makes her a weak cultivator compared to her sister, Linglong as well as the other disciples of Shaoyang Sect.
- Cheng Yi as Yu Sifeng (禹司凤) / Xi Xuan (熙轩)
  - The young head disciple of Lize Palace. Sifeng is rational, calm, resourceful and extremely skilled and powerful. Meeting Xuanji, Mingyan and Linglong introduces him to the concept of love, friendship and identity which he is deprived of as a disciple of Lize Palace. Also the only son of the Jade Emperor and the Demon Princess.

=== Supporting cast ===
==== The Shaoyang Sect (少阳派) ====
- Zhang Yuxi as Chu Linglong (褚玲珑)
  - The eldest daughter of the Shaoyang Sect Leader Chu Lei and Chu Xuanji's twin sister. She has a bright personality but can be hot-tempted and is extremely protective of Xuanji. She is good friends with Minyan, whom she also has romantic feelings for. Later, she is kidnapped by Wu Tong, who extracts her primordial spirit and creates a new version of her from a flower demon. As Linglong's spirit is out of her body, her body is unconscious.
- Liu Xueyi as Hao Chen (昊辰) / White Emperor (白帝; Báidì)
  - A powerful senior disciple of the Shaoyang Sect. His actual identity is the Heavenly White Emperor of the East.
- Li Junyi as Zhong Minyan (钟敏言)
  - The sixth senior disciple of Shaoyang Sect and is good friends with Xuanji and Linglong. He has mutual feelings for Linglong. He also the first person to witness Xuanji's true power when she unconsciously defeats Gu Diao (the Eagle Demon).
- Huang Peng as Du Mingxing, eldest disciple.
- Wang Xudong as Chen Minjue, second disciple.
- Zhou Yidan as Duan Qing (端清)
  - A disciple who admires Hao Chen
- Gu Zhishen as Feng Minsheng, fourth disciple.
- Ma Li as Ouyang Minlin, fifth disciple.
- Zhou Yutong as a disciple who likes telling stories.
- He Zhonghua as Chu Lei (褚磊)
  - The leader of Shaoyang Sect, Linglong and Xuanji's father. Although he is strict and stern in the rules of his sect and the cultivation of immortality, he cares a lot for his daughters.
- Min Chunxiao as Chu Yinghong
  - An elder of the Sect and Chu Lei's junior sister. She is a kind-hearted aunt to Linglong and Xuanji.
- Zhang Lei as Heng Yang
  - An elder who is responsible for protecting the Shaoyang Sect's secret mirror.
- Yang Zijiang as He Yang, a Sect elder.
- Zhu Rongrong as Lü Yang
  - An elder of the Sect who is in charge of detecting anomalies.
- Cheng Rang as Pu Yang, a Sect elder.
- Zhang Yanyan as He Danping
  - Xuanji and Linglong's deceased mother. She was murdered after discovering a secret about the Lize Palace.

==== The Lize Palace ====
- Mickey He as Master of Lize Palace
  - He dotes on Sifeng and his abilities. He is later revealed to be his father.
- Zhu Zixiao as Yuan Lang (元朗)
  - Deputy Master of Lize Palace. He appears ambitious, cunning and duplicitous.
- Zhou Junwei as Ruo Yu (若玉)
  - Sifeng's disciple brother and is secretly Yuan Lang's subordinate.
- Han Chengyu as Liu Yihuan
  - An abandoned disciple who violated sect rules by having romantic feelings and having a child.
- Xu Haiwei as Elder Bai
- Hu Yuansong as Elder Luo
- Sun Xuejun as Elder He

==== Heavenly Celestial Realm ====
- Huang Haibing as the Heavenly Emperor
  - He currently resides at Mount Kunlun, adhering to being a bystander of all events.
- Wei Wei as Star Lord Siming
  - A deity who serves the White Emperor in the Heavenly Realm.
- Bai Shu as Tengshe (騰蛇)
  - An arrogant celestial lord who loves eating and getting into fights. He later becomes Xuanji's spirit pet after causing havoc in a small village in his flying snake form. Although appearing to dislike Xuanji, he deeply cares for her and aids her through her troubles.
- Lu Peng as Qinglong (青龙)
  - One of the four heavenly beasts, the Azure Dragon. He is also Teng She's friend.
- Huang Qian as Baihu (白虎)
  - One of the four heavenly beasts, the White Tiger.
- Mao Yiwen as Xuanwu (玄武)
  - One of the four heavenly beasts, the Black Tortoise.
- Dai Zixiang as Zhuque (朱雀)
  - One of the four Heavenly beasts, the Vermilion Bird.

==== Mount Kunlun ====
- Tian Yupeng as Lord Xuan Huo
  - A celestial official who is responsible for protecting the Heavenly Emperor's stay at Mount Kunlun.
- Liu Li as Wu Lu
  - One of the ten sorcerers that protects the borders of Mount Kunlun.
- Mao Na as Wu Peng
  - One of the ten sorcerers that helps keeps the borders of Mount Kunlun safe. She is espically skilled in creating illusions.
- Yan Feng as Wu Fan
  - Another sorcerer that helps keeps the borders safe.

==== Demon Tribe ====
- Li Xinze as Louhou Ji Du [Rahu Ketu] / Star of Mosha (羅喉計都)
  - The Demon Maleficent Star and a powerful general under the command of King Asura. He was actually King Bailing/Hao Chen's best friend later turned enemies with him because of betrayal. He wanted to stop the war but before that he was poisoned by Hao Chen/King Bailing.
- Ma Jinghan as King Xiuluo [Asura] (修羅王)
  - The Demon King who raged a war with the Heavenly Realm 1,000 of years ago with the help of the Star of Mosha.
- Zhu Zixiao as Yuan Lang (元朗)
  - Right Minister of the Demon Tribe and the Master of Tian Xu Hall. He is obsessed with possessing the four spiritual keys.
- Fu Fangjun as Wu Zhiqi (無支祁)
  - Left Minister of the Demon Tribe who aids The Star of Mosha. He is a monkey demon in his true form.
- Huang Youming as Wu Tong
  - A former disciple of Dian Jing Valley who became banished from his sect after his attempt to cause harm. Due to his banishment and exile, he resorts to joining the Demon Tribe and becomes Yuan Lang's subordinate. Wu Tong is an arrogant and vicious man. He falls in love at first sight with Linglong and attempts to manipulate her memories.

===== Tian Xu/Sky Hall =====
- Li Ze as Di Lang (地狼)
  - A member of Tian Xu Hall who is also a loyal subordinate of Yuan Lang. He assists his master's desire to obtain three of the spirit keys and ultimately sacrifices himself for Yuan Lang. He takes on the identity of Ouyang and works as an attendant at Fuyu Island.
- Wang Jiu Sheng as Elder Xing Su
  - An astronomer and advisor.

==== Immortal Spirits and Demons ====
- Hong Mengyao as Zi Hu (紫狐)
  - A purple fox spirit from the Qingqiu Fox Tribe that loves grapes. She resides and trains at Zhongli City and impersonates the identity of Goddess Gao. She is deeply devoted to Wu Zhiqi, going to lengths as cultivating a human form and waited a thousand years for him.
- Yao Yi Chen as Ting Nu (亭奴)
  - A merman who was formerly a fairy doctor in the Heavenly Realm before his banishment and subsequent reincarnication to the Merfolk Tribe. He is skilled in medicine and healing. Aware of his past life as a celestial being, he recognises Xuanji's true identity. He develops a friendship with Sifeng and Xuanji and helps them along their journey.
- Liu Meng Rui as Yu Er (玉儿; 玉兒)
  - Liu Yihuan's daughter who is a half demon.
- Xu Yuan Yuan as a Flower Demon
  - An unnamed flower demon who Wu Tong rescues and helps. In return, she transforms herself into Linglong, combining half of hers and Linglong's primordial spirits into one form. She later betrays him as she regains awareness of her true identity and is killed by Wu Tong.
- Yang Xi Zi as Lu Yanran/Xiao Yinghua
  - The human form of a silver flower snake. She is Sifeng's spirit animal who secretly admires him. She takes on the identity of a Dian Jing Valley disciple.
- Bai Yimeng as a little demon spirit

==== Xuanyuan Sect ====
- Du Jun Ze as Zhu Shi
  - Sect Leader. He and his sect are brutally killed by the Tian Xu Sect after refusing to give up one of the four spiritual keys.
- Wang Bin as Elder Ling Shi
- Wang Xiao Wei as Elder Xuan Shi
- Yan Yi Long as Elder Mo Shi
- Jiang Zhen Hao as disciple Shi Feng

==== Fuyu Island ====
- Qian Yong Chen as Dongfang Qingqi
  - The Chief of Fuyu Island. He is deeply, although unrequitedly in love with his wife, Qing Rong. He is so blind in his love for her that he ignores the fact that she loves someone else.
- Zhao Yingzi as Qing Rong
  - Madame Dongfang, the wife of the Sect Chief who is also considered the most beautiful woman in the world. She is actually the last remaining member of the Saintess Cult Demon Tribe that was annihilated by the people of Fuyu Island. She loves and has an affair with Ouyang without knowing his true motives.
- Fu Meng Ni as Yu Ning
  - A disciple of the Island Sect and befriends Xuanji and Sifeng.
- Wu Yi Tao as Pian Pian
  - A disciple of the Island Sect and also befriends Xuanji and Sifeng.
- Wang Xingyi as Elder Kong Ding
- Li Ze as Attendant Ouyang, Di Lang in disguise.

==== Dian Jing Valley ====
- Yu Bin as Lord Rong
  - Sect Leader.
- Han Ye as Wen Haofeng
  - A disciple and a daughter of the former Dian Jing Valley Sect Leader. She is Sifeng's mother.

==== Other Supporting Cast ====
- Huang Yi as Ah Lan
  - Sifeng's companion who follows him to practice medical skills and spells. She admires him.
- Wu Yujue as Ruo Xue
  - Ruo Yu's younger sister.
- Song Kai as Yu Lu
  - A guard at Fenru City.
- Yu Qing as Shen Shu
  - A guard at Fenru City
- Zhang Gong as Emperor
  - An Emperor in the mortal realm in one of Xuanji's past lives.
- Chu Fei as Elder Bi

Extra Actor

- Kai Wang
