= Liu Xueyi =

Chinese actor

- 刘学义
- Born: July 6, 1990 (age 36); Qingdao, Shandong, China
- Education: Bachelor of Arts
- Alma mater: Central Academy of Drama
- Occupation: Actor
- Years active: 2013–present
- Agent(s): H&R Century Pictures
- Height: 183 cm (6 ft 0 in)

Chinese name
- Traditional Chinese: 劉學義
- Simplified Chinese: 刘学义
Transcriptions
Standard Mandarin
- Hanyu Pinyin: Liú Xuéyì

Liu Xueyi (Chinese: 刘学义; pinyin: Liú Xuéyì; born 6 July 1990) is a Chinese actor. He is known for his roles in the Netflix's dramas Kill Me Love Me (2024), In Blossom (2024), and Love and Redemption (2020).

== Early life and education ==
Liu Xueyi was born on 6 July 1990 in Qingdao, Shandong, China. He left home to study when he was a child. After studying dance for five years, he transferred to acting. He was admitted to Central Academy of Drama in 2010 and graduated in 2014.

== Career ==
In 2013, Liu made his acting debut in the historical drama Shangguan Wan'er. In 2015, Liu starred in the historical drama The Legend Xiao Zhuang, playing Mongolian prince Ejei Khan.

In 2016, Liu starred in his first movie Ice Beauty where he played a loyal man in search for his lost lover. The same year, he gained recognition for his role as a morally ambiguous man in the hit fantasy action drama Noble Aspirations. He reunited shortly with his Noble Aspirations co-stars in the historical romance drama Legend of Dragon Pearl.

In 2018, Liu gained further popularity with his roles as Zhan Huang and Heavenly Emperor in the fantasy romance drama The Destiny of White Snake. He then starred in a spin-off of the drama, titled The Legend of Heavenly Emperor where he plays the main character.

In 2019, Liu starred in the mystery adventure drama The Lost Tomb 2: Explore with the Note, based on the novel Daomu Biji; playing Xie Yuchen.

In 2020, Liu was cast in his first leading role in the historical romance drama Qing Luo. The same year, he starred in the xianxia romance drama Love and Redemption.

In 2021, Liu starred in the xianxia romance drama Ancient Love Poetry.

== Filmography ==
=== Film ===
Year	English title	Chinese title	Role	Notes
2016	Ice Beauty	冰美人	Zhang Mengsheng	
2019	The Legend of Heavenly Emperor	天乩之天帝传说	Heavenly Emperor	
2022	Love at Night Movie	夜色暗涌时 电影版	Mo Lingze	
2022	Autumn Cicada	秋蝉	Lin Xiaozhuang	

=== Television series ===
Year	English title	Chinese title	Role	Network	Notes
2014	Shangguan Wan'er	上官婉儿	Wu Sansi		
2014	First Girlfriends Club	初恋女友俱乐部	Fang Hao	Tencent Video	
2015	The Legend Xiao Zhuang	大玉儿传奇	Ejei Khan	Sichuan Network	
2016	Paper Restaurant	我们的纯真年代	Tu Qiang	Hebei Network	
2016	Noble Aspirations	青云志	Xiao Yicai	Hunan TV	
2016	Noble Aspirations II	青云志2	Xiao Yicai	Tencent Video	
2017	Legend of Dragon Pearl	龙珠传奇之无间道	Wu Yingqi	Anhui TV, Beijing TV	
2018	The Destiny of White Snake	天乩之白蛇传说	Zhan Huang/Heavenly Emperor	iQiyi	
2019	The Lost Tomb 2: Explore with the Note	怒海潜沙&秦岭神树	Jie Yuchen	Tencent Video	
2020	Autumn Cicada	秋蝉	Lin Xiaozhuang	Jiangsu TV, Zhejiang TV	
2020	Love and Redemption	琉璃	Hao Chen / Emperor Lord Bai Lin	Mango TV, Youku	
2021	Ancient Love Poetry	千古玦尘	Tian Qi	Tencent Video	
2021	Love at Night	夜色暗涌时	Mo Lingze	Mango TV	
2021	Qing Luo	清落	Ye Xiudu	Youku	
2021	The Lost Tomb 2: Explore With the Note	盗墓笔记2之云顶天宫	Xie Yuchen	Tencent Video	
2021	Pandora's Box	天目危机	Li Xiufu [Young]	Mango TV	
2022	The Blood of Youth	少年歌行	Wu Xin / Ye Anshi	Youku	
2023	A League of Nobleman	君子盟	Royal uncle	Tencent Video	
2023	Destined	长风渡	Luo Zishang	CCTV, iQiyi	
2023	Unshakable Faith	画眉	Ji Danyang	CCTV, Tencent Video, Youku	
2024	In Blossom	花间令	Pan Yue	Youku	
2024	What If	生活在别处的我	Yu Jian	Tencent Video	
2024	Kill Me Love Me	春花焰	Murong Jinghe	Youku	
2025	A Moment But Forever	念无双	Yuan Zhong	iQiyi, Youku	
2025	Love Never Fails	落花时节又逢君	Jin Xiu	Mango TV	
2025	The Princess's Gambit	桃花映江山	Shen Zaiye	Tencent Video	
2026	Fate Chooses You	佳偶天成	Yuan Zhong	iQiyi, Tencent Video	
2026	Against the Current	兰香如故	Lin Jinqi	Tencent Video	
TBA	The Blood of Youth Season 2	少年歌行2	Wu Xin / Ye Anshi	Youku	
TBA	Northern Wei Dynasty	江山大同	Tuoba Jun / Emperor Wen Cheng	Tencent Video	
TBA	Snow Trace	踏雪寻踪	Jian Ming	Youku	
