= Li Xinyi =

Li Xinyi may refer to:

- Li Xinyi (singer) (born 1998), Chinese singer and songwriter
- Li Xinyi (tennis) (born 1962), Chinese tennis player
