= Zhou Zhennan =

Chinese singer

- 周震南
- Born: 21 June 2000 (age 25); Chongqing, China
- Other name: Vin Zhou
- Education: Chengdu Meishi International School
- Occupations: Rapper; singer; dancer; host; songwriter
- Musical career
- Genres: Mandopop; Hip hop
- Instruments: Vocals, keyboard, electric guitar
- Years active: 2017–present
- Label: Wajijiwa Entertainment
- Formerly of: R1SE

Chinese name
- Traditional Chinese: 周震南
- Simplified Chinese: 周震南
Transcriptions
Standard Mandarin
- Hanyu Pinyin: Zhōu Zhènnán

Zhou Zhennan (Chinese: 周震南; born 21 June 2000) is a Chinese rapper, singer, songwriter and dancer. He is best known as being a former member of boy group R1SE, after finishing first in Tencent's Produce Camp 2019.

== Early life ==
Born on June 21, 2000, Zhou attended Chengdu Meishi International School.

== Career ==
=== Pre-debut ===
Zhou trained under JYP Entertainment as a trainee from August 2014 to 2017, before coming back to China for his debut.

=== 2017–2018: Career beginnings ===
Zhou was a contestant in The Coming One and was placed fourth overall. Zhou released his debut EP V on 14 December 2018. It was announced that Zhou would join the cast of Let Go of My Baby alongside rapper Jackson Wang and other fellow artistes. Zhou, together with South Korean singer Samuel collaborated and participated in Tencent's The Collaboration Season 2. The duo eventually placed first and won the competition. Zhou won the Best Music Newcomer award in "Tencent Supernova Night Awards" on 30 January 2018.

=== 2019–present: V's Prelude and Produce Camp 2019 ===
Zhou released his second EP, V's Prelude on 26 February 2019, consisting of three tracks. It was announced that Zhou, together with a few other trainees, will be representing WAJIJIWA Entertainment on Chinese reality boy band survival show Produce Camp 2019. His performances were well received from fans and has consistently placed first by votes on the show. He debuted with R1SE with the center position on the final episode after finishing in first place.

In 2020, He ranked 46th on Forbes China Celebrity 100 list.

== Discography ==
=== Studio albums ===
Title	Details
You Jump, I Jump	Released: 21 June 2022; Label: Wajijiwa Entertainment; Formats: Digital download, streaming; Track listing: 1. "Há?"; 2. "You Jump, I Jump"; 3. "If I Die, Tomorrow"; 4. "葛拉蒂"; 5. "不是所有猫都像你一样温顺"; 6. "终有一散的人们"
F.F.F	Released: 1 September 2023; Label: Wajijiwa Entertainment; Formats: Digital download, streaming; Track listing: 1. "F.F.F"; 2. "Die Now, or Love Forever"; 3. "Revelation"; 4. "Save"; 5. "Red"; 6. "Fake Love"; 7. "风吹过海，山丘，整个宇宙"
Heal My Broken Soul	Released: 17 October 2024; Label: Wajijiwa Entertainment; Formats: Digital download, streaming; Track listing: 1. "Heal My Broken Soul"; 2. "Fury"; 3. "指环"; 4. "Fool"; 5. "2021.10.14"; 6. "孩童"; 7. "吠"

=== Extended plays ===
Title	Details
V	Released: 14 December 2017; Label: Wajijiwa Entertainment; Formats: Digital download, streaming; Track listing: 1. "Hate Me"; 2. "Do What I Want"; 3. "Jail"; 4. "On The Top"
V's Prelude (Little Star—V的序曲)	Released: 26 February 2019; Label: Wajijiwa Entertainment; Formats: Digital download, streaming; Track listing: 1. "Forest" (森林); 2. "Little Star" (小星星); 3. "I Will Show You"
Love&Desire	Released: 7 April 2020; Label: Wajijiwa Entertainment; Formats: Digital download, streaming; Track listing: 1. "Love" (爱); 2. "Desire"

=== Singles ===
Title	Year	Peak chart positions	Album
Title	Year	CHN	Album
"Forest" (森林)	2019	76	V's Prelude
"You Jump, I Jump"	2022	*	You Jump, I Jump
"Die Now, or Love Forever"	2023	*	F.F.F
"F.F.F"	2023	*	F.F.F
"Revelation"	2023	*	F.F.F
"Save"	2023	*	F.F.F
"*" denotes a chart did not exist at that time.

=== Promotional singles ===
Title	Year	Notes
"Halo, It's Me" (整整两年了) (with Victor Ma)	2017	Single for The Coming One (season 1)
"得吧" (with Yao Chen & Zhang Yanqi)	2020	
"C" (with Meng Meiqi)	2020	Single for Produce Camp 2020
"出去玩" (with Wajijiwa artists)	2022	Label promotional single
"动物凶猛" (with AnsrJ)	2023	Single for The Rap of China 2023
"看见" (with Wajijiwa artists)	2024	Label promotional single

=== Soundtrack appearances ===
Title	Year	Notes
"Law of Attraction" (吸引力法则) (with Zhao Tianyu)	2018	Mr. Right OST

== Filmography ==
=== Television shows ===
Year	Title	Network	Notes
2017	The Coming One	Tencent	Contestant
2018	Let Go of My Baby	Tencent	Cast member
2018	The Collaboration Season 2	Tencent	Contestant
2019	Produce Camp 2019	Tencent	Contestant
2020	The Coming One Season 4	Tencent	Mentor
2021	Produce Camp 2021	Tencent	Mentor
2021	New Generation Hip-hop Project	IQiyi	Mentor

== Awards and nominations ==
Year	Award	Category	Nominated Work	Result
2018	Tencent Supernova Night Awards	Best Music Newcomer	—N/a	Won
