= Wu Ji Feng =

Chinese singer and actor

- 吴季峰
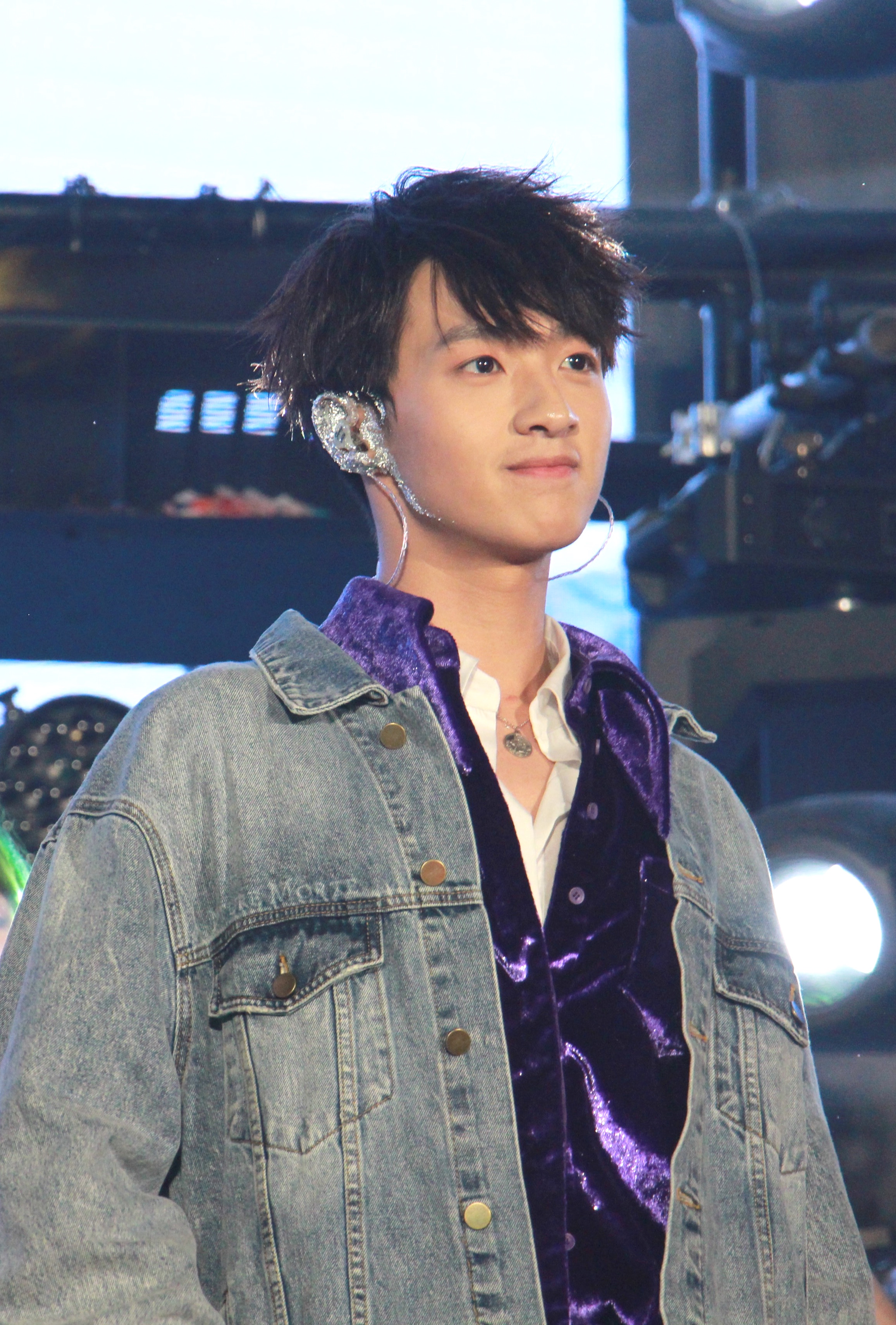
- Wu Jifeng at ETM's Starry Show 2019
- Born: 6 May 1999 (age 26); Benxi, Liaoning, China
- Education: Southwest Minzu University - Japanese major
- Known for: Singer, Actor
- Notable work: Windmill and Wind (2019); Cassini's Eternity (2019); Youth is a whole summer (2019); Mr Honesty (Don't Lie To Your Lover) (2020) as Gu Bo
- Awards: Like King in 《Produce Camp 2019》
- Website: https://www.weibo.com/u/5669997792

Wu Jifeng (Simplified Chinese: 吴季峰, Traditional Chinese characters: 吳季峰, Pinyin: Wu Ji Feng, born 6 May 1999 in Benxi, Liaoning province, China) is a Chinese singer and actor. He is under contract with ETM 活力时代.

From 5 April 2019, Wu Jifeng participated in Produce Camp 2019 of Tencent Video as a contestant to form a boy group. He ranked 20th.

His debut single "Windmill and Wind" was released on 17 July 2019. His first EP Summer Monsoon was released on 19 September 2019 with 2 new songs: "Cassini’s Eternity", and "Youth is a whole summer".

In the same year, 2 photo books Nice to meet you and Nice to see you were published. He models for fashion magazines such as VogueMe, ELLEMEN, etc.

In August and November 2019, he participated in Tencent Video’s sport program 超新星全运会 (Super Nova Games) – 2nd season. From October 10, 2019, he joined the crew of web drama 不说谎恋人 (Don’t Lie To Your Lover or Mr Honesty), as 顾博 (GuBo).

In December 2019, he was a red carpet host and guest performer of 金骨朵网络影视盛典 - 4th Golden Bud Network Film and TV Festival, and he also joined Popular Stage of 2019doki festival as the opening performer.

== Early life ==
Wu Jifeng was born into a literary and artistic family. He studied calligraphy at an early age. Influenced by his mother, he loves to sing. In high school, he watched the band EXO’s performance and dreamed of joining a boy group. However, his parents opposed his choice at first, because they were afraid that they couldn’t protect him.

In 2017, Wu Jifeng graduated from Benxi high school in Liaoning, and enrolled in Japanese Language and Literature at Southwest Minzu University in Chengdu, Sichuan.

Wu chased his dream as a trainee of ETM Academy since 2018.

== Career ==
=== Produce Camp 2019 ===
From February to June, 2019: Wu participated in Produce Camp 2019, the Chinese version of Produce 101, successfully entered the final round, and ranked 20th finally.

In the program, Wu Jifeng performed: Theme song "喊出我的名字 / Call Me Call My Name", "Baby", "Lesion", "追梦的蚂蚁 / The Ant Chasing Dream", "男儿当自强 / A Man Should Stand Strong", "给一个很爱的人 / To The One I Love", "赤子 / Chizi (Pure and Innocence)", "离人 / Departing One", "不哭 / Don’t Cry", and gained King of “Like” title in his second performance.

=== Variety Shows ===
After Produce Camp 2019, Wu participated in other variety shows:

- Sohu's 我的同事是明星 (My Colleague Is Super Star) (July 2019)
- Kugou’s 酷狗首唱会 (August 2019)
- QQ Music's 见面吧电台 (Mr.Radio),
- Kugou’s 酷狗星乐坊 (September 2019)
- Tencent Video’s 超新星全运会第二季 (Super Nova Games) 2nd season (October〜November, 2019)
- Tencent Video’s 鹅宅好时光 (Happy Time At Goose’s House) (February 2020)

=== Music ===
- "风车与风" (Windmill and Wind), (17 July 2019)
- “Windmill and Wind” certified gold on QQ Music. (23 July 2019)
- EP 夏天季风 (Summer Monsoon) including 3 songs: "风车与风" (Windmill and Wind), "卡西尼的永恒" (Cassini's Eternity), and "青春是一整个夏天" (Youth is a Whole Summer). (19 September 2019)
- EP Summer Monsoon certified gold on QQ Music. (20 September 2019)

=== Photo books, Magazines ===
- Photo books Nice to meet you and Nice to see you (August 2019)
- Model for fashion magazines such as: VogueMe、 ELLEMEN 、 Tencent Fashion、 STARBOX、 ChicBanana、 IWEEKLY、 O！what、Vivi、 Fireworks magazine

=== Filmography ===
- 致我们甜甜的小美满 (The Love Equations) (April 2020) - Guest Role "Li Xiao Feng" [Yi Xing's rival] (Ep. 8)
- Portrayed GuBo in web drama 不说谎恋人 (Don’t Lie To Your Lover (Mr Honesty)) (June 2020)

=== Events ===
- Appeared in 金骨朵网络影视盛典 - the 4th Golden Guduo Network Film Awards as red carpet host and guest performer. (22 December 2019)
- Guest performer for opening stage in Tencent Video's 2019doki festival (28 December 2019)
