= Produce Camp 2019 =

Chinese boy group competition show

- Also known as: CHUANG 2019

Chinese name
- Traditional Chinese: 創造營 2019
- Simplified Chinese: 创造营 2019
Transcriptions
Standard Mandarin
- Hanyu Pinyin: Chuàngzàoyíng Èrlíng yījiǔ
- Genre: Reality, Survival Competition
- Created by: CJ E&M
- Developed by: Tencent
- Presented by: Dilraba Dilmurat
- Starring: Tiger Hu; Aaron Kwok; Alec Su; Stanley Huang
- Judges: "Citizen Producers" (Viewers)
- Announcer: 何雁南 (pinyin: Hé Yànnán)
- Ending theme: 《喊出我的名字》 (pinyin: Hǎnchū wǒ de míngzi; lit. 'Shout My Name') (Call Me, Call My Name)
- Country of origin: China
- Original languages: Chinese; Mandarin
- No. of episodes: 10

Production
- Production locations: Qingdao, Shandong
- Camera setup: Multi-camera
- Running time: 129–221 minutes 246 minutes (finale)
- Production companies: Hao Feng Qingyun; CJ E&M; Tencent Penguin Pictures

Original release
- Network: Tencent Video
- Release: April 6 – June 8, 2019

Related
- Produce 101; Produce 101 China; Produce Camp 2020; Produce Camp 2021; Produce Camp Asia: Thailand

Produce Camp 2019 (Chinese: 创造营2019; pinyin: Chuàngzàoyíng Èrlíng yījiǔ), or alternatively known as CHUANG 2019, is a Chinese male group reality television show premiered on Tencent Video on April 6, 2019 as the second season of Produce 101 China. The final members debuted as R1SE.

The series is jointly produced by 7-D Vision and Tencent Penguin Pictures for Tencent Video, under license from Mnet's owner CJ E&M.

== Background ==
Unlike in Produce 101 China, during the first performance assessment, the trainees are divided into four classes (instead of five), which are equivalent to A, B, C, and F (but no D). The classes are named "Top Class" (Chinese: 尖子班; pinyin: Jiānzi bān), "Normal Class" (Chinese: 普通班; pinyin: Pǔtōng bān), "Passable Class" (Chinese: 及格班; pinyin: Jígé bān), and "Audit Class" (Chinese: 旁听班; pinyin: Pángtīng bān; lit. 'Listener Class').

== Mentors ==
The series was presented by Dilraba Dilmurat. Other artists featured as cast members:

- Vocal training: Alec Su
- Rap training: Stanley Huang
- Dance training: Aaron Kwok
- Composition training: Tiger Hu

== Contestants ==
Color key

- Left the show
- Top 11 of the week
- Saved from elimination
- Eliminated in Episode 4
- Eliminated in Episode 7
- Eliminated in Episode 9
- Eliminated in Episode 10
- Final debuting member

Company	Name	Age	Judges evaluation	Ranking													
Company	Name	Age	Judges evaluation	E02	E03	Episode 4		E05	E06	Episode 7		E08	Episode 9		Episode 10		Final
Company	Name	Age	Judges evaluation	#	#	#	Votes	#	#	#	Votes	#	#	Votes	#	Votes	Final
Wajijiwa Entertainment (哇唧唧哇娱乐)	Vin Zhou / Zhou Zhennan (周震南)	26	A	1	1	1	7,047,203	1	1	1	15,743,856	1	1	8,466,959	1	37,098,540	1
Wajijiwa Entertainment (哇唧唧哇娱乐)	Xia Zhiguang (夏之光)	26	A → B	2	2	2	2,738,345	4	4	5	8,390,520	7	7	2,662,885	4	11,107,051	4
Wajijiwa Entertainment (哇唧唧哇娱乐)	Zhao Lei (赵磊)	27	A → B	7	7	5	2,514,182	7	9	9	6,321,710	14	16	1,594,355	10	7,503,760	10
Wajijiwa Entertainment (哇唧唧哇娱乐)	Zhai Xiaowen (翟潇闻)	27	F	10	9	9	2,388,971	8	7	7	7,309,151	8	5	2,861,507	6	10,581,322	6
Wajijiwa Entertainment (哇唧唧哇娱乐)	Yan Xujia (焉栩嘉)	25	A	3	6	6	2,512,447	5	5	4	8,469,327	3	3	3,307,633	3	11,164,384	3
Wajijiwa Entertainment (哇唧唧哇娱乐)	Peng Chuyue (彭楚粤)	32	F	5	8	11	2,369,743	14	14	14	4,730,087	18	14	1,708,660	17	5,734,833	17
Jaywalk Newjoy (嘉行新悅传媒)	Jiang Yiming (蒋熠铭)	27	B	49	50	48	414,173	44	32	30	1,648,677	34	34	Eliminated			34
Jaywalk Newjoy (嘉行新悅传媒)	Zhao Zefan (赵泽帆)	29	B	48	45	42	487,126	34	27	26	1,718,498	22	20	1,468,345	22		22
Jaywalk Newjoy (嘉行新悅传媒)	Zhao Youwei (赵宥维)	28	C	54	70	64	Eliminated										68
Jaywalk Newjoy (嘉行新悅传媒)	Lu Huanyu (卢奂瑜)	27	B	45	90	84	Eliminated										85
Jaywalk Newjoy (嘉行新悅传媒)	Qin Tian (秦天)	32	B	34	37	30	675,046	33	33	28	1,664,065	33	31	Saved	26	543,765	26
Jaywalk Newjoy (嘉行新悅传媒)	Feng Chuxuan (丰楚轩)	29	A	33	29	25	824,190	21	21	22	2,754,560	21	19	1,505,985	25	749,878	25
Easyplus (壹心壹加壹)	Heliao Luyun (何廖侣匀)	27	C	55	75	74	Eliminated										75
Easyplus (壹心壹加壹)	Yu Bin (俞彬)	32	C	43	49	44	469,349	41	42	32	1,567,265	31	32	Eliminated			32
Easyplus (壹心壹加壹)	Yu Chengen (余承恩)	28	C	46	25	24	889,129	25	24	24	1,970,667	26	26	Eliminated			28
Easyplus (壹心壹加壹)	Gu Tianhang (顾天航)	26	C	36	67	62	Eliminated										66
Easyplus (壹心壹加壹)	Niu Chao (牛超)	28	A	50	24	21	1,197,601	18	19	19	3,862,556	17	17	1,556,199	16	6,598,460	16
Banana Entertainment (香蕉娱乐)	Zeng Gangjie (曾纲杰)	28	C	91	96	94	Eliminated										94
Banana Entertainment (香蕉娱乐)	Huang Zhenyu (黄震宇)	31	C	56	82	91	Eliminated										91
Banana Entertainment (香蕉娱乐)	Chen Yujia (陈郁佳)	27	C	97	66	79	Eliminated										80
Nuclear Fire Media (火核文化)	He Junxiong (贺俊雄)	27	A → B	14	13	13	1,839,188	32	36	33	1,558,375	29	28	Eliminated			29
Nuclear Fire Media (火核文化)	Lin Zijie (林子杰)	26	C	24	22	26	815,724	51	49	47	Eliminated						48
Nuclear Fire Media (火核文化)	Wu Xiongcheng (吴雄成)	31	F	44	58	67	Eliminated										67
Nuclear Fire Media (火核文化)	Zhou Zhaoyuan (周兆渊)	32	B	16	12	18	1,459,047	49	43	44	Eliminated						45
Nuclear Fire Media (火核文化)	Xiong Yiwen (熊艺文)	30	C	30	23	28	784,444	52	50	49	Eliminated						50
Qin's Entertainment (坤音娱乐)	Yang Tao (杨淘)	28	F	71	61	66	Saved	56	54	54	Eliminated						55
Qin's Entertainment (坤音娱乐)	Lin Yiming (麟壹铭)	30	F	74	60	63	Eliminated										67
Youhug Media (耀客传媒)	Dai Jingyao (戴景耀)	33	F	11	20	20	1,220,770	15	18	18	3,925,368	19	18	1,529,204	21	2,816,767	21
ESEE Model (esee英模)	Si Zheng (四正)	32	C	35	47	40	493,669	27	28	38	Eliminated						40
Long WuTian Culture (缔壹娱乐)	Zhang Yidong (张艺东)		C	75	78	76	Eliminated										77
Starrylab (泰洋星河)	Du Yu (杜煜)	26	C	61	44	52	358,856	53	55	55	Eliminated						56
Huayi Brothers (华谊兄弟聚星)	Guo Xingye (郭星冶)		F	27	54	60	Saved	Eliminated									64
1CM Lingyu Entertainment (1CM领誉)	Wang Zhiwen (王志文)	31	F	60	76	85	Saved	54	52	52	Eliminated						53
Individual Trainee (个人练习生)	Shi Ziyi (史子逸)	31	F	85	92	87	Eliminated										87
Individual Trainee (个人练习生)	Yu Haoran (于浩然) (Kendall Erik Brant)	28	F	21	39	57	Eliminated										61
Individual Trainee (个人练习生)	Yu Zongyao (余宗遥)		C	81	91	92	Eliminated										92
Individual Trainee (个人练习生)	Wang Chenyi (王晨艺)	28	A	12	4	4	2,635,642	9	6	6	7,883,385	Left the show					
Mantra Pictures M-Mantra (工夫真言)	Yan Bo (闫博)	30	F	94	98	96	Eliminated										96
Mantra Pictures M-Mantra (工夫真言)	Wan Yuhang (万雨航)	30	C	90	95	81	Eliminated										82
Mantra Pictures M-Mantra (工夫真言)	Hou Li (侯立)	29	C	57	71	70	Eliminated										72
Mantra Pictures M-Mantra (工夫真言)	Liu Chenyu (刘宸羽)		F	77	77	86	Saved	Eliminated									86
Hot Idol Music (好好栮朷)	Liu Jinyu (刘谨瑜)	26	C	82	89	83	Eliminated										84
Hot Idol Music (好好栮朷)	Mars/Ma Xueyang (马雪阳)	40	B	17	28	27	801,197	24	30	35	Saved	20	23	Eliminated			27
Hot Idol Music (好好栮朷)	Yu Ke (余可)	30	B	92	88	82	Eliminated										83
Hot Idol Music (好好栮朷)	Zhang Meng (张猛)	27	C	88	97	97	Eliminated										97
Hot Idol Music (好好栮朷)	Zhang Mingxuan (张铭轩)	29	C	83	94	95	Eliminated										95
Jiyun Culture (极韵文化)	Lin Yadong (林亚冬)	22	B	66	55	47	418,735	37	44	45	Eliminated						46
Jiyun Culture (极韵文化)	Zhang Dayuan (张达源)	30	B	53	40	36	517,578	48	53	53	Eliminated						54
SDT Entertainment (SDT娱乐)	Ryan Zhao / Zhao Rang (赵让)	25	A	9	11	10	2,380,071	11	8	8	7,021,480	9	9	1,990,164	11	7,498,972	11
SDT Entertainment (SDT娱乐)	Rex / Li Xinyi (李鑫一)	21	A → B	23	18	19	1,352,570	20	20	20	3,606,625	10	10	1,962,970	13	7,490,277	13
SDT Entertainment (SDT娱乐)	Dai Shaodong (代少冬)		C	69	33	39	494,760	58	58	59	Saved	35	36	Eliminated			36
SDT Entertainment (SDT娱乐)	Xu Ke (徐珂)	30	B	68	62	77	Eliminated										78
Yihui Media (意汇传媒)	Hu Haofan (胡浩帆)	32	F	32	56	46	419,827	43	46	48	Eliminated						49
Yihui Media (意汇传媒)	Li Yunrui (李昀锐)	30	B	6	16	15	1,642,526	22	23	21	3,371,809	15	21	1,433,721	19	4,926,666	19
TH Entertainment (天浩盛世)	Dong Xiangke (董向科)	28	F	37	43	41	488,289	50	51	51	Eliminated						52
TH Entertainment (天浩盛世)	Bai Hongtao (白洪滔)		F	26	30	29	690,184	57	59	58	Eliminated						59
TH Entertainment (天浩盛世)	Guo Jiarui (郭珈睿)		F	25	31	37	512,446	59	57	57	Eliminated						58
Kangxi Pictures (康曦影業)	Wei Shenzhou (魏伸洲)	28	F	84	84	73	Eliminated										74
Kangxi Pictures (康曦影業)	Cui Shaoyang (崔绍阳)	30	F	70	65	54	315,042	55	56	56	Eliminated						57
Kangxi Pictures (康曦影業)	Li Weijie (李伟捷)	29	F	80	87	80	Eliminated										81
Huaying Entertainment (华影艺星)	Ji Yitong (纪一曈)	28	F	59	80	90	Eliminated										90
Huaying Entertainment (华影艺星)	Zhong Nuoyan (钟诺言)	25	F	65	83	93	Eliminated										93
Begonia Culture Media (海宁海棠)	Louis/Lu Siheng (陆思恒)	33	A	15	17	16	1,595,851	16	11	10	6,101,702	11	12	1,758,391	12	7,492,944	12
Chuangxin Power (创星力量)	Zhu Weizhi (朱微之)	28	F	29	42	32	557,736	38	40	42	Eliminated						44
Fanling Culture (泛领文化) (JYP China全资公司)	Yao Chen (姚琛)	28	F	41	59	38	506,363	10	12	12	5,788,938	5	4	3,156,314	5	10,764,262	5
Pelias (依海文化)	Liu Ye (刘也)	32	A	4	5	7	2,418,541	6	10	11	5,797,964	4	6	2,826,571	8	7,974,641	8
Attitude Music (态度音乐)	Zhang Yanqi (张颜齐)	28	B	18	10	8	2,390,388	3	3	3	8,638,533	6	8	2,489,183	7	9,626,829	7
Asian Idol Factory (AIF娱乐)	Lin Ran (林染)	27	F	39	26	35	518,132	31	38	39	Eliminated						41
Asian Idol Factory (AIF娱乐)	Yang Tairui (杨泰瑞)	29	F	28	36	56	Eliminated										60
Asian Idol Factory (AIF娱乐)	Li Jingze (李景泽)	25	F	51	32	58	Eliminated										62
Asian Idol Factory (AIF娱乐)	Tang Xin (唐心)		F	67	35	61	Eliminated										65
iMe Entertainment (iMe娱乐)	Li Yang (李扬)	32	F	40	69	78	Eliminated										79
iMe Entertainment (iMe娱乐)	Deng Jiakun (邓佳坤)	31	F	96	81	89	Saved	Eliminated									89
iMe Entertainment (iMe娱乐)	Zai Ming (在铭)	30	F	58	74	72	Saved	26	34	40	Eliminated						42
iMe Entertainment (iMe娱乐)	Li Yizhe (李一喆)	28	F	76	93	99	Eliminated										99
Rui Star Culture (睿星文化)	Bi Haoran (毕皓然)	30	C	47	57	50	403,075	45	41	41	Eliminated						43
Rui Star Culture (睿星文化)	Yu Yuanfan (余远帆)	28	C	86	86	65	Eliminated										69
Rui Star Culture (睿星文化)	Zhang Jiongmin (张炯敏)	28	F	31	38	31	583,879	42	47	46	Eliminated						47
MIGO TOM (哇偶文化)	Wang Xiaochen (王孝辰)	28	B	73	73	75	Eliminated										76
MIGO TOM (哇偶文化)	Qiao Junwu (乔君武)	29	C	79	68	53	338,775	39	31	36	Eliminated						39
Huakaibanxia Cultural Media (花开半夏)	Wang Yiheng (王艺衡)	28	C	64	46	45	458,138	35	29	37	Saved	36	35	Eliminated			35
Huakaibanxia Cultural Media (花开半夏)	Li Hechen (李和宸)	27	C	63	63	71	Eliminated										73
Chaodian Culture (超电文化)	Yi Yan (易言)	34	C	78	64	49	408,219	47	48	50	Eliminated						51
Chaodian Culture (超电文化)	Liu Xiajun (刘夏俊)	27	C	89	72	69	Eliminated										71
JNERA Cultural Media (嘉纳盛世)	Duan Haonan (段浩男)	26	F	98	51	55	311,669	46	35	29	1,655,068	23	24	Saved	24	832,008	24
Niuban culture (牛班文化)	Zhao Zhenghao (赵政豪)	25	A	22	19	17	1,589,556	13	15	17	4,073,217	25	25	Saved	18	5,073,049	18
Jiashang Media (嘉尚传媒)	Ren Shihao (任世豪)	28	C	19	34	34	524,719	28	26	25	1,832,939	28	29	Eliminated			30
Jiashang Media (嘉尚传媒)	Xiao Kaizhong (肖凯中)	32	F	52	52	43	469,960	40	45	43	Saved	32	33	Eliminated			33
Core culture (核心文化)	Wu Tianren (吴天任)		B	95	100	98	Eliminated										98
ETM vitality era (ETM活力時代)	Wu Jifeng (吴季峰)	27	B	20	15	14	1,732,428	17	17	16	4,447,459	24	22	1,414,815	20	2,828,886	20
Proud culture (傲普文化)	Sun Qijun (孙圻峻)	26	C	62	41	33	525,897	30	37	31	1,632,193	27	27	Saved	23	1,229,193	23
Original Plan (原际画)	He Luoluo (何洛洛)	25	B	8	3	3	2,729,640	2	2	2	8,862,602	2	2	3,765,911	2	13,652,312	2
Oriental Story (东方物語)	Cai Zhengjie (蔡正杰)	26	B	38	53	51	395,771	36	39	34	Eliminated						38
Kaila Picture (鲜花盛开)	Wang Tong (王通)	30	C	93	99	100	Eliminated										100
White Media (白色系)	POI Ren / Ren Hao (任豪)	31	A → B	13	21	22	1,092,653	23	22	23	2,466,677	12	11	1,820,977	9	7,511,752	9
Yinhe Kuyu Media (银河酷娱)	Terry/Liu Te (刘特)	30	C	87	79	68	Saved	29	25	27	1,676,635	27	30	Eliminated			31
D.Wang Media (大王文化)	Li Tianqi (李天琪)	30	C	72	88	88	Saved	Eliminated									88
XYSZ Media (喜遇尚作)	Luo Dianxia (罗殿夏)		C	42	48	59	Eliminated										63
MountainTop (泰洋音乐)	Gao Jialang (高嘉朗)	33	A		27	23	974,132	19	16	15	4,667,715	16	13	1,734,123	14	6,902,191	14
Topping Culture (拓影文化)	Zhang Yuan (张远)	41	A		14	12	2,368,294	12	13	13	5,099,031	13	15	1,646,404	15	6,795,086	15
Catwalk (凯渥经纪)	Lin Huanjun (林焕钧)	25	B	Left the show													

== Evaluations ==
Color key

- Winning Team
- Center
- Most Voted Trainee

Episode 3: Group Evaluation
Song	Team	Contestants
Youth Memorial Book 《青春纪念册》	Strong	Zhao Rang
Youth Memorial Book 《青春纪念册》	Strong	Yu Ke
Youth Memorial Book 《青春纪念册》	Strong	Li Xinyi
Youth Memorial Book 《青春纪念册》	Strong	Wang Xiaochen
Youth Memorial Book 《青春纪念册》	Strong	Bi Haoran
Youth Memorial Book 《青春纪念册》	Strong	Yang Tao
Youth Memorial Book 《青春纪念册》	Opponent	Niu Chao
Youth Memorial Book 《青春纪念册》	Opponent	Zhai Xiaowen
Youth Memorial Book 《青春纪念册》	Opponent	Lin Ran
Youth Memorial Book 《青春纪念册》	Opponent	Ren Hao
Youth Memorial Book 《青春纪念册》	Opponent	Lin Yadong
Youth Memorial Book 《青春纪念册》	Opponent	Gu Tianhang
Youth Memorial Book 《青春纪念册》	Opponent	Guo Jiarui
Treasure	Strong	Gao Jialang
Treasure	Strong	Liu Xiajun
Treasure	Strong	Hou Li
Treasure	Strong	Yu Bin
Treasure	Strong	Chen Yujia
Treasure	Strong	Duan Haonan
Treasure	Strong	Wan Yuhang
Treasure	Opponent	Feng Chuxuan
Treasure	Opponent	Qin Tian
Treasure	Opponent	Zhou Zhaoyuan
Treasure	Opponent	Zhao Zhenghao
Treasure	Opponent	Li Weijie
Treasure	Opponent	Li Yang
Treasure	Opponent	Liu Te
Treasure	Opponent	Jiang Yiming
Lesion	Strong	He Luoluo
Lesion	Strong	Zhao Youwei
Lesion	Strong	Peng Chuyue
Lesion	Strong	Xiao Kaizhong
Lesion	Strong	Deng Jiakun
Lesion	Strong	Sizheng
Lesion	Opponent	Yan Xujia
Lesion	Opponent	Wu Jifeng
Lesion	Opponent	Xu Ke
Lesion	Opponent	Ren Shihao
Lesion	Opponent	Sun Qijun
Lesion	Opponent	Zeng Gangjie
Lesion	Opponent	Du Yu
Lesion	Opponent	Bai Hongtao
Peony River 《牡丹江》	Strong	Zhang Yuan
Peony River 《牡丹江》	Strong	Zhao Zefan
Peony River 《牡丹江》	Strong	Wang Zhiwen
Peony River 《牡丹江》	Strong	Dong Xiangke
Peony River 《牡丹江》	Strong	Zhang Mingxuan
Peony River 《牡丹江》	Opponent	Yu Zongyao
Peony River 《牡丹江》	Opponent	Ma Xueyang
Peony River 《牡丹江》	Opponent	Zhang Meng
Peony River 《牡丹江》	Opponent	Wu Tianren
Peony River 《牡丹江》	Opponent	Wang Yiheng
Peony River 《牡丹江》	Opponent	Yi Yan
Peony River 《牡丹江》	Opponent	Shi Ziyi
Peony River 《牡丹江》	Opponent	Yu Haoran
Happy Getaway 《逍遥游》	Strong	Liu Ye
Happy Getaway 《逍遥游》	Strong	Xia Zhiguang
Happy Getaway 《逍遥游》	Strong	Wei Shenzhou
Happy Getaway 《逍遥游》	Strong	Qiao Junwu
Happy Getaway 《逍遥游》	Strong	Zhao Lei
Happy Getaway 《逍遥游》	Strong	Li Jingze
Happy Getaway 《逍遥游》	Strong	Wang Tong
Happy Getaway 《逍遥游》	Strong	Yan Bo
Happy Getaway 《逍遥游》	Opponent	Dai Jingyao
Happy Getaway 《逍遥游》	Opponent	Li Yunrui
Happy Getaway 《逍遥游》	Opponent	Zhang Dayuan
Happy Getaway 《逍遥游》	Opponent	Guo Xingye
Happy Getaway 《逍遥游》	Opponent	Huang Zhenyu
Happy Getaway 《逍遥游》	Opponent	Lin Yiming
Happy Getaway 《逍遥游》	Opponent	Yu Yuanfan
Happy Getaway 《逍遥游》	Opponent	Hu Haofan
I Want to Fly 《我要飞》	Strong	Wang Chenyi
I Want to Fly 《我要飞》	Strong	Zaiming
I Want to Fly 《我要飞》	Strong	Liu Chenyu
I Want to Fly 《我要飞》	Strong	Li Yizhe
I Want to Fly 《我要飞》	Strong	Zhang Jiongmin
I Want to Fly 《我要飞》	Opponent	Lu Siheng
I Want to Fly 《我要飞》	Opponent	Lin Zijie
I Want to Fly 《我要飞》	Opponent	Zhong Nuoyan
I Want to Fly 《我要飞》	Opponent	He Junxiong
I Want to Fly 《我要飞》	Opponent	Xiong Yiwen
I Want to Fly 《我要飞》	Opponent	Lu Huayu
I Want to Fly 《我要飞》	Opponent	Dai Shaodong
I Want to Fly 《我要飞》	Opponent	Luo Dianxia
Monkey King 《悟空》	Strong	Zhou Zhennan
Monkey King 《悟空》	Strong	Zhu Weizhi
Monkey King 《悟空》	Strong	Li Hechen
Monkey King 《悟空》	Strong	Yu Chengen
Monkey King 《悟空》	Strong	Zhang Yanqi
Monkey King 《悟空》	Strong	Ji Yitong
Monkey King 《悟空》	Strong	He Liao Luyun
Monkey King 《悟空》	Strong	Li Tianqi
Monkey King 《悟空》	Opponent	Yao Chen
Monkey King 《悟空》	Opponent	Wu Xiongcheng
Monkey King 《悟空》	Opponent	Cui Shaoyang
Monkey King 《悟空》	Opponent	Yang Tairui
Monkey King 《悟空》	Opponent	Cai Zhengjie
Monkey King 《悟空》	Opponent	Tang Xin
Monkey King 《悟空》	Opponent	Liu Jinyu
Monkey King 《悟空》	Opponent	Zhang Yidong

Episode 6: Position Evaluation
Position	Song	Contestants	Votes	Total votes
Vocal	Childhood 《儿时》	Zhai Xiaowen	197	450
Vocal	Childhood 《儿时》	Li Yunrui	108	450
Vocal	Childhood 《儿时》	Zhang Jiongmin	87	450
Vocal	Childhood 《儿时》	Zhang Dayuan	22	450
Vocal	Childhood 《儿时》	Dong Xiangke	36	450
Vocal	Straight to the Point 《开门见山》	Lu Siheng	152	447
Vocal	Straight to the Point 《开门见山》	Gao Jialang	88	447
Vocal	Straight to the Point 《开门见山》	Leon Zhu	63	447
Vocal	Straight to the Point 《开门见山》	Si Zheng	97	447
Vocal	Straight to the Point 《开门见山》	Hu Haofan	47	447
Vocal	How Are You? 《你，好不好？》	Zhou Zhaoyuan	56	444
Vocal	How Are You? 《你，好不好？》	Rex Li	233	444
Vocal	How Are You? 《你，好不好？》	Dai Shaodong	28	444
Vocal	How Are You? 《你，好不好？》	Zhao Zefan	50	444
Vocal	How Are You? 《你，好不好？》	Yu Bin	77	444
Vocal	The Ants Chasing Dreams 《追梦的蚂蚁》	Wu Jifeng	249	439
Vocal	The Ants Chasing Dreams 《追梦的蚂蚁》	Lin Zijie	65	439
Vocal	The Ants Chasing Dreams 《追梦的蚂蚁》	Guo Jiarui	42	439
Vocal	The Ants Chasing Dreams 《追梦的蚂蚁》	Lin Yadong	57	439
Vocal	The Ants Chasing Dreams 《追梦的蚂蚁》	Yi Yan	26	439
Composition	Binhe East Road 《滨河东路》	Zhao Lei	81	459
Composition	Binhe East Road 《滨河东路》	Yan Xujia	134	459
Composition	Binhe East Road 《滨河东路》	Zhang Yanqi	142	459
Composition	Binhe East Road 《滨河东路》	Zhao Zhenghao	53	459
Composition	Binhe East Road 《滨河东路》	Jiang Yiming	18	459
Composition	Binhe East Road 《滨河东路》	He Junxiong	31	459
Composition	Fireman	Zhou Zhennan	176	444
Composition	Fireman	Liu Ye	72	444
Composition	Fireman	Feng Chuxuan	26	444
Composition	Fireman	Yao Chen	59	444
Composition	Fireman	Li Tianqi	16	444
Composition	Fireman	Liu Te	95	444
Dance	EMP	Xia Zhiguang	235	457
Dance	EMP	Mars Ma	31	457
Dance	EMP	Bai Hongtao	19	457
Dance	EMP	Ren Shihao	132	457
Dance	EMP	Lin Ran	40	457
Dance	Treasure Boyfriend 《宝藏男友》	He Luoluo	150	452
Dance	Treasure Boyfriend 《宝藏男友》	Deng Jiakun	24	452
Dance	Treasure Boyfriend 《宝藏男友》	Ren Hao	122	452
Dance	Treasure Boyfriend 《宝藏男友》	Yu Chengen	101	452
Dance	Treasure Boyfriend 《宝藏男友》	Sun Qijun	55	452
Dance	Handclap	Wang Chenyi	184	450
Dance	Handclap	Zhang Yuan	52	450
Dance	Handclap	Zai Ming	102	450
Dance	Handclap	Liu Chenyu	23	450
Dance	Handclap	Wang Zhiwen	89	450
Dance	No Joke	Peng Chuyue	177	450
Dance	No Joke	Xiong Yiwen	14	450
Dance	No Joke	Bi Haoran	18	450
Dance	No Joke	Cai Zhengjie	149	450
Dance	No Joke	Du Yu	44	450
Dance	No Joke	Qiao Junwu	48	450
Dance	Let Me Love You	Zhao Rang	187	448
Dance	Let Me Love You	Dai Jingyao	67	448
Dance	Let Me Love You	Niu Chao	123	448
Dance	Let Me Love You	Yang Tao	50	448
Dance	Let Me Love You	Guo Xingye	21	448
Dance	Moonlight Lovers 《月光爱人》	Qin Tian	142	445
Dance	Moonlight Lovers 《月光爱人》	Xiao Kaizhong	103	445
Dance	Moonlight Lovers 《月光爱人》	Wang Yiheng	63	445
Dance	Moonlight Lovers 《月光爱人》	Cui Shaoyang	96	445
Dance	Moonlight Lovers 《月光爱人》	Duan Haonan	41	445

Color key

- Saved

Episode 6: Pending Trainees
Name	Votes
Liu Te	307
Wang Zhiwen	301
Yang Tao	262
Deng Jiakun	210
Guo Xingye	146
Li Tianqi	65
Liu Chenyu	47

Episode 8: Concept Evaluation
Song	Guest Performer	Contestants	Votes (%)
Transform 《蜕变》	Ouyang Nana	Zhou Zhennan	24.1
Transform 《蜕变》	Ouyang Nana	Zhao Lei	24.1
Transform 《蜕变》	Ouyang Nana	Zhang Yuan	24.1
Transform 《蜕变》	Ouyang Nana	Gao Jialang	24.1
Transform 《蜕变》	Ouyang Nana	Zhao Zhenghao	24.1
Transform 《蜕变》	Ouyang Nana	Zhao Zefan	24.1
Beat Me if You Can	Xu Mengjie (Rocket Girls 101)	Yan Xujia	24.1
Beat Me if You Can	Xu Mengjie (Rocket Girls 101)	Zhao Rang	24.1
Beat Me if You Can	Xu Mengjie (Rocket Girls 101)	Liu Ye	24.1
Beat Me if You Can	Xu Mengjie (Rocket Girls 101)	Yao Chen	24.1
Beat Me if You Can	Xu Mengjie (Rocket Girls 101)	Niu Chao	24.1
Beat Me if You Can	Xu Mengjie (Rocket Girls 101)	Ren Hao	24.1
King 《国王》	Song Yanfei	Wang Chenyi	14.6
King 《国王》	Song Yanfei	Xia Zhiguang	14.6
King 《国王》	Song Yanfei	Lu Siheng	14.6
King 《国王》	Song Yanfei	Dai Jingyao	14.6
King 《国王》	Song Yanfei	Sun Qijun	14.6
King 《国王》	Song Yanfei	He Junxiong	14.6
Brave 《敢》	Chen Yuqi	Zhai Xiaowen	13.6
Brave 《敢》	Chen Yuqi	Li Yunrui	13.6
Brave 《敢》	Chen Yuqi	Qin Tian	13.6
Brave 《敢》	Chen Yuqi	Wang Yiheng	13.6
Brave 《敢》	Chen Yuqi	Duan Haonan	13.6
Brave 《敢》	Chen Yuqi	Xiao Kaizhong	13.6
Brave 《敢》	Chen Yuqi	Mars Ma	13.6
Declaration 《宣言》	Zhu Xudan	He Luoluo	12.1
Declaration 《宣言》	Zhu Xudan	Feng Chuxuan	12.1
Declaration 《宣言》	Zhu Xudan	Yu Chengen	12.1
Declaration 《宣言》	Zhu Xudan	Ren Shihao	12.1
Declaration 《宣言》	Zhu Xudan	Liu Te	12.1
Declaration 《宣言》	Zhu Xudan	Yu Bin	12.1
To Someone I Love the Most 《给一个爱的人	Li Landi	Zhang Yanqi	11.5
To Someone I Love the Most 《给一个爱的人	Li Landi	Wu Jifeng	11.5
To Someone I Love the Most 《给一个爱的人	Li Landi	Rex Li	11.5
To Someone I Love the Most 《给一个爱的人	Li Landi	Peng Chuyue	11.5
To Someone I Love the Most 《给一个爱的人	Li Landi	Dai Shaodong	11.5
To Someone I Love the Most 《给一个爱的人	Li Landi	Jiang Yiming	11.5

Episode 10: Debut Evaluation
Song	Contestants
Riding the Wind 《乘风》	He Luoluo
Riding the Wind 《乘风》	Liu Ye
Riding the Wind 《乘风》	Zhao Rang
Riding the Wind 《乘风》	Ren Hao
Riding the Wind 《乘风》	Gao Jialang
Riding the Wind 《乘风》	Zhang Yuan
Riding the Wind 《乘风》	Niu Chao
Riding the Wind 《乘风》	Dai Jingyao
Riding the Wind 《乘风》	Feng Chuxuan
Riding the Wind 《乘风》	Zhao Zefan
Riding the Wind 《乘风》	Li Yunrui
Riding the Wind 《乘风》	Zhao Zhenghao
Riding the Wind 《乘风》	Sun Qijun
Newborn 《赤子》	Zhou Zhennan
Newborn 《赤子》	Yan Xujia
Newborn 《赤子》	Yao Chen
Newborn 《赤子》	Zhai Xiaowen
Newborn 《赤子》	Xia Zhiguang
Newborn 《赤子》	Zhang Yanqi
Newborn 《赤子》	Rex Li
Newborn 《赤子》	Lu Siheng
Newborn 《赤子》	Peng Chuyue
Newborn 《赤子》	Zhao Lei
Newborn 《赤子》	Wu Jifeng
Newborn 《赤子》	Qin Tian
Newborn 《赤子》	Duan Haonan

Special Individual Performances				
Team	Team Members	Song	Artist	Group Performance
Dance Team	Lu Siheng	Jyounetsu-Tairiku	Taro Hakase	Animal Style Chicken Nuts
Dance Team	Liu Ye	Dream In a Dream	NCT-Ten	Animal Style Chicken Nuts
Dance Team	Zhao Rang	Never Be Like You	Flume	Animal Style Chicken Nuts
Dance Team	Feng Chuxuan	Hotline Bling	Drake	Animal Style Chicken Nuts
Dance Team	Niu Chao	Superman Remix		Animal Style Chicken Nuts
Dance Team	Sun Qijun	I'll Show You		Animal Style Chicken Nuts
Dance Team	He Luoluo	HUMBLE (Remix)		Animal Style Chicken Nuts
Dance Team	Qin Tian	Naruto Main Theme	Toshio Masuda	Animal Style Chicken Nuts
Dance Team	Xia Zhiguang	Big Fish	Zhou Shen	Animal Style Chicken Nuts
Vocal Team	Gao Jialang	Versace on the Floor	Bruno Mars	《少年之时》
Vocal Team	Rex Li	Adoration		《少年之时》
Vocal Team	Dai Jingyao	Whenever		《少年之时》
Vocal Team	Zhao Lei	Sit By		《少年之时》
Vocal Team	Zhao Zhenghao	You're On My Way		《少年之时》
Vocal Team	Li Yunrui	A Secret After All		《少年之时》
Vocal Team	Zhai Xiaowen	In Dream		《少年之时》
Vocal Team	Zhao Zefan	I Can		《少年之时》
Vocal Team	Wu Jifeng	Don't Cry	Sunnee	《少年之时》
Vocal Team	Peng Chuyue	The World Would Not Collapse Easily	EXCUSE ME	《少年之时》
Rap Team	Zhang Yanqi	Fog	Zhang Yanqi	Get Through the Waves With a Pure Heart (赤子之心 乘风破浪)
Rap Team	Duan Haonan	Swordsman	Duan Haonan	Get Through the Waves With a Pure Heart (赤子之心 乘风破浪)
Rap Team	Ren Hao	BKING	Ren Hao	Get Through the Waves With a Pure Heart (赤子之心 乘风破浪)
Rap Team	Zhang Yuan	Crossroad	Zhang Yuan	Get Through the Waves With a Pure Heart (赤子之心 乘风破浪)
Rap Team	Yan Xujia	When Will It Burn	Yan Xujia	Get Through the Waves With a Pure Heart (赤子之心 乘风破浪)
Rap Team	Yao Chen	Hamsterman	Yao Chen	Get Through the Waves With a Pure Heart (赤子之心 乘风破浪)
Rap Team	Zhou Zhennan	More Love, More Trust	Zhou Zhennan	Get Through the Waves With a Pure Heart (赤子之心 乘风破浪)

== Ranking ==
Color key

- New Top 11

No.	Ep. 2	Ep. 3	Ep. 4	Ep. 5	Ep. 6	Ep. 7	Ep. 8	Ep. 9	Ep. 10
1	Zhou Zhen-nan	Zhou Zhen-nan =	Zhou Zhennan =	Zhou Zhennan =	Zhou Zhennan =	Zhou Zhennan =	Zhou Zhennan =	Zhou Zhennan =	Zhou Zhennan =
2	Xia Zhi-guang	Xia Zhi-guang =	Xia Zhiguang =	He Luo-luo ↑1	He Luoluo =	He Luoluo =	He Luoluo =	He Luoluo =	He Luoluo =
3	Yan Xujia	He Luoluo ↑5	He Luoluo =	Zhang Yanqi ↑5	Zhang Yanqi =	Zhang Yanqi =	Yan Xujia ↑1	Yan Xujia =	Yan Xujia =
4	Liu Ye	Wang Chenyi ↑8	Wang Chenyi =	Xia Zhiguang ↓2	Xia Zhiguang =	Yan Xujia ↑1	Liu Ye ↑7	Yao Chen ↑1	Xia Zhiguang ↑3
5	Peng Chuyue	Liu Ye ↓1	Zhao Lei ↑2	Yan Xujia ↑1	Yan Xujia =	Xia Zhiguang ↓1	Yao Chen ↑7	Zhai Xiaowen ↑3	Yao Chen ↓1
6	Li Yunrui	Yan Xujia ↓3	Yan Xujia =	Liu Ye ↓2	Wang Chenyi ↑3	Wang Chenyi =	Zhang Yanqi ↓4	Liu Ye ↓2	Zhai Xiaowen ↓1
7	Zhao Lei	Zhao Lei =	Liu Ye ↓2	Zhao Lei ↑2	Zhai Xiaowen ↑1	Zhai Xiaowen =	Xia Zhiguang ↓2	Xia Zhiguang =	Zhang Yanqi ↑1
8	He Luoluo	Peng Chuyue ↓3	Zhang Yanqi ↑2	Zhai Xiaowen ↑1	Zhao Rang ↑3	Zhao Rang =	Zhai Xiaowen ↓1	Zhang Yanqi ↓2	Liu Ye ↓2
9	Zhao Rang	Zhai Xiaowen ↑1	Zhai Xiaowen =	Wang Chenyi ↓5	Zhao Lei ↓2	Zhao Lei =	Zhao Rang ↓1	Zhao Rang =	Ren Hao ↑2
10	Zhai Xiaowen	Zhang Yanqi ↑8	Zhao Rang ↑1	Yao Chen ↑28	Liu Ye ↓4	Lu Siheng ↑1	Li Xinyi ↑10	Li Xinyi =	Zhao Lei ↑5
11	Dai Jingyao	Zhao Rang ↓2	Peng Chuyue ↓3	Zhao Rang ↓1	Lu Siheng ↑5	Liu Ye ↓1	Lu Siheng ↓1	Ren Hao ↑1	Zhao Rang ↓2

== Discography ==
=== Singles ===
Title	Released	Language	Label
《喊出我的名字》(pinyin: Hǎnchū wǒ de míngzi; lit. 'Shout My Name') (Call Me, Call My Name）	April 5, 2019	Mandarin	Tencent
《少年之时》	May 17, 2019	Mandarin	Tencent

== Franchise ==
Chuang (franchise)

Preceded by Produce 101 China	Chuang (franchise); Produce Camp 2019	Succeeded by Produce Camp 2020
