= Li Xinyi (singer) =

Chinese singer and songwriter

- 李鑫一
- Born: March 13, 1998 (age 28); Liaoning, China
- Other name: Rex (小霸王)
- Occupations: singer; songwriter
- Musical career
- Genres: Mandopop; Hip hop
- Instruments: Vocals, guitar
- Years active: 2019–present
- Label: SDT Entertainment

Li Xinyi (Chinese: 李鑫一; born 13 March 1998), also known as Rex (Chinese: 小霸王), is a Chinese singer and songwriter. He was a contestant in the survival program, Produce Camp 2019. His debut single, Dream with Me, was released at the 2019 Opening Ceremony of the 5th Annual Jackie Chan International Action Film Week and charted on Billboard China's Social Music Chart at No. 11.

== Early life and education ==
Li was born on 13 March 1998 in Liaoning, China. He was an avid basketball player until he was introduced to singing. He attends the Beijing Contemporary Music Academy.

== Career ==
=== 2019–present: Produce Camp 2019 and solo debut ===
In 2019, Li and three other trainees represented SDT Entertainment on Chinese reality boy band show Produce Camp 2019. He placed 13th in the final episode and was eliminated. He did not join the final debuting lineup, R1SE. However, he made his solo debut with the single "Dream with Me" on July 16, 2019. His second single, titled "Walk with You" was released on August 7, 2019. He released his third single, "就让我走", together with the music video on August 26, 2019. Li released his debut EP One, consisting of three songs. He took part in the OST of the television series, 梦回 with the single, "梦她".

== Discography ==
=== Albums ===
Album information	Track listing
One: EP; Released: 2019; Label: SDT Entertainment	Track listing: 1. 我的你; 2. 末班地铁; 3. 第一感

=== Singles ===
Year	Title	Format	Album	Other notes
2019	Dream with Me (陪我做梦)	Digital download, streaming	—N/a	Debut single
2019	Walk with You (陪你走过)	Digital download, streaming	—N/a	Promotional song for the film, The King's Avatar: For the Glory (全职高手之巅峰荣耀)
2019	就让我走	Digital download, streaming	—N/a	
2019	末班地铁	Digital download, streaming	One	Debut EP
2019	第一感	Digital download, streaming	One	Debut EP
2019	梦她	Digital download, streaming	梦回 OST	

== Filmography ==
=== Television shows ===
Year	Title	Network	Notes
2019	Produce Camp 2019	Tencent	Contestant

== Videography ==
=== Music videos ===
Year	Music video	Album	Ref.
2019	"Dream with Me (陪我做梦)"	Non-album single	
2019	Walk with You (陪你走过)	The King's Avatar: For the Glory (全职高手之巅峰荣耀)	
2019	就让我走	Non-album single	
2019	末班地铁	One	
