= Chengdu Meishi International School =

- 成都美视国际学校

Location
- 1340, Middle Section of Tianfu Avenue; Chengdu, 610042; People's Republic of China

Information
- Opened: September 1, 2002
- Founder: Yang De-ming and Grace Chen Qi
- Principal: Thomas Liu
- Colors: Blue, white, yellow
- Website: https://www.miscd.com/

Chengdu Meishi International School (Chinese: 成都美视国际学校; pinyin: Chéngdū Měishì Guójì Xuéxiào) is a private for-profit secondary school in Chengdu, China. The school is owned and operated by the private Shenzhen Meishi Group Chengdu Meishi Culture Co., Ltd. It was founded in 2002.
